= Teacher tenure reform (United States) =

Teacher tenure is a policy that restricts the ability to fire teachers, requiring a "just cause" rationale for firing. The individual states each have established their own tenure systems. Tenure provides teachers with protections by making it difficult to fire teachers who earn tenure. Some states are focusing on revisions so that the tenure system no longer functions the same way as currently.

== Overview ==
While each state has its own specifics for how teacher tenure works, most hold a similar form. Each new teacher is given a probationary period (which vary among states). During this probation period, teachers must prove they are worthy of receiving tenure. They must prove that they are having a positive effect on their students using a teacher evaluation system, which includes information from several facets of a teacher's responsibilities. Some common facets are classroom observations, student growth, and self-reflection (for example, New Haven and the state of Virginia).

For example, currently under New Jersey's tenure system, a teacher is placed on probation for three years during which time the teacher is evaluated using a system called AchieveNJ. During or after these three years, the principal must decide if the school will grant tenure to this teacher. If so, the teacher will be asked to work there for a fourth year and will be granted tenure. The principal is able to fire a teacher at any time during the probation period. However, once a teacher is tenured, the principal can no longer fire a teacher without just cause. The teacher is then protected by tenure. There are four reasons a teacher may be fired in New Jersey once they are tenured. The reasons include: incapacity, inefficiency, unbecoming conduct and just cause. A teacher being fired for any of these reasons is given a chance to defend their case.

== History ==
Tenure was created to provide teachers with due process protections. Some say the fight for these protections started around the 1920s as an outgrowth of the women's rights movement at a time when most teachers were women and most principals were men. But a historical survey of indefinite teacher tenure activities and legislation in the United States found that indefinite tenure is a direct outgrowth of the civil service reform movement of the nineteenth century and that the line of historical development extends continuously from 1880.

== The debate ==
=== Proposals to change or eliminate tenure ===
Several states are looking into changing (in the name of reforming) and even eliminating their teacher tenure system. Some of the states leading the movement include Florida, New Jersey, Idaho, Illinois, Indiana, Ohio, New York and Pennsylvania. Many would also like to see teachers being evaluated based on their performance and their students' academic achievement. In eight states in America, tenure is given to teachers after just two years of teaching during the probation period. In two states, tenure is awarded after only one year of teaching during the probation period. Washington DC does not require a set time for awarding tenure. Supporters of this notion feel that one or two years is too short a time to tell if a teacher is having a positive effect on their students. Before these teachers are granted lifetime job protection, they would like to see them perform on probation for a longer period of time. Changes have been created in all forms. Some proposals call for longer probation periods while others call for stricter teacher evaluations. Other proposals wish to end the tenure system completely and replace this system with renewable contracts.

==== Key actors ====
Former New Jersey Governor Chris Christie proposed to (as he called it) reform the tenure system in New Jersey. He wished to eliminate the current tenure system and replace it with a new one. Currently in New Jersey, after a teacher proves themselves efficient for 3 years, they gain lifetime protection under tenure. Christie's proposal would also see teachers prove themselves for three years to gain tenure. However, after one year of being deemed "ineffective", teachers could easily be fired under his scheme. Christie wanted to judge whether a teacher is ineffective or not on a two part assessment. One part of the score will be based on student achievement. The second part of the score will be based on teacher performance. Christie believes the answer to making schools more effective is to place more accountability on teachers. Christie stated, "Let New Jersey lead the way again,", "The time to eliminate teacher tenure is now."

Former chancellor of DC public schools, Michelle Rhee, had made plans to eliminate teacher tenure altogether. Rhee designed a pay plan which would compensate teachers by giving them big pay raises in exchange for their tenure protection rights. She gave existing tenured teachers the choice to accept this proposal. New hires would be forced to accept this new pay plan. New hires would be paid on the basis of their students' achievement. While teachers would prospectively be able to make more money under this pay plan, they would not be granted any tenure protections. Rhee's plan was unsuccessful. Teachers did not want to give up their tenure protections for a higher salary. After this plan failed she continued to devise plans. She offered a buyout plan for existing teachers with tenure. In 2009, she created a plan called IMPACT. This plan tied students performance on state tests to teachers evaluation. While this plan gained the support of many, there were still many others who opposed it.

=== Against changes in the tenure system ===
In some states, schools are required to pay more to teachers who have earned higher degrees, and tenure allows teachers to secure a job, go back to school, and return to their jobs, not fearing dismissal because of their higher pay grade. Supporters liken tenure to the concept of seniority in other jobs. Teachers are often forced into uncomfortable situations (such as failing students, choosing certain students). An employee who makes decisions of a difficult and confrontational nature would thus require job protection. Many who are against the motion of reforming/eliminating tenure argue that tenure allows teaching to become a profession rather than just a job. Presumably, teachers would not have as much job stability and would be forced to transfer from school to school. Giving teachers permanent positions would allow them to form bonds and relationships with students, parents, and other faculty.

== Recent activity ==
Several jurisdictions have considered changes in their tenure system since the 1990s. Some of these states include:

- California has seen many attempts to change their tenure system. One of the more recent attempts was made by Governor Arnold Schwarzenegger in January 2005. He tried to pass an act (Excellence in Teaching Act) which would pay teachers on the basis of their performance. He also wanted to enact the "Put the Kids First Act" which would extend the probation period of teachers to five years (it is currently two years). This act would also allow a school to fire teachers after two unsatisfactory ratings. The school would no longer have to give the teacher 90 days to improve their performance before being fired. This stirred up much controversy among the teachers in California. The act was voted on and was never passed.
- Florida- In 1997 a major movement toward changing tenure took place, which its proponents considered a success. This change reduced the probationary period a teacher worked to achieve tenure to 97 days instead of a year. During those 97 days, a teacher could be fired without just cause. Only 101 of Florida's 10,689 new teachers were dismissed by the school in 1998. While this reform was considered a success by some, teacher unions stepped in and won back many protections. In 2009, a new plan was proposed. Legislators wished to get rid of tenure for all new teachers. Tenure would be replaced with yearly renewable contracts. After ten years, a teacher would be eligible for renewable contracts which would last up to five years. This plan was never passed by the Senate.
- New York- In 2007, Mayor Michael Bloomberg voiced his concern that although teachers could be let go easily during the three year probation period, they hardly ever were. In 2008, Bloomberg introduced the Principal Portal. This was a tool that principals would use to help evaluate their teachers. It gave them guidelines to follow and base their decisions on. The number of teachers let go during their probation period doubled in the first year under the Principal Portal. Bloomberg also wished to have students test scores incorporated in the tenure process.

== See also ==
- StudentsFirst
- LIFO (education)
