= 2010 Washington, D.C., mayoral election =

- November 2, 2010
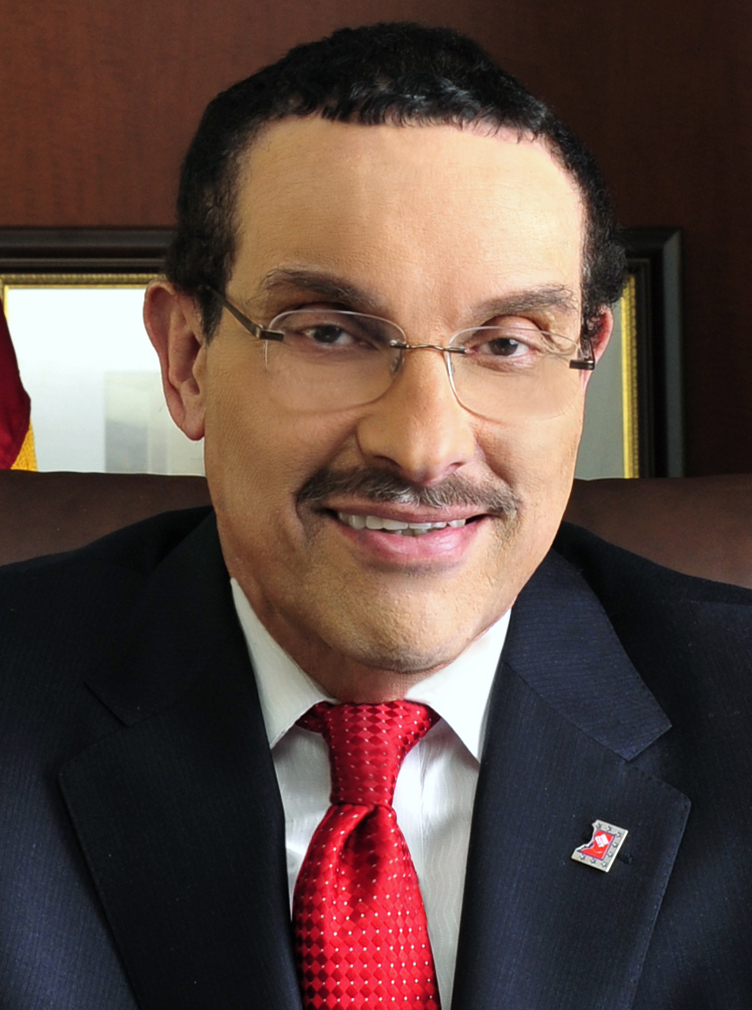

Nominee	Vincent C. Gray	Write–in (Note: Most Write-ins are thought to be for Adrian Fenty despite Fenty endorsing Vincent Gray. However, the election report does not separate the write-in votes by candidate.)
Party	Democratic
Popular vote	97,978	29,599
Percentage	74.20%	22.42%
- Gray: 40–50% 50–60% 60–70% 70–80% 80–90% >90% Write-ins: 40–50% 50–60%
Mayor before election
Adrian Fenty
Democratic
Elected Mayor
Vincent C. Gray
Democratic

On November 2, 2010, Washington, D.C., held an election for its mayor. The primary elections occurred on September 14. Vincent Gray won the general election by a wide margin, although many voters wrote in incumbent Mayor Adrian Fenty, whom Gray defeated in the primary election.

== Democratic primary ==
Early polls showed incumbent Mayor Adrian Fenty was not widely supported. On January 31, 2010, The Washington Post reported the results of a voter survey which showed that Fenty's job approval rating was at an all-time low of 42 percent. His support among African-American voters dropped to 29 percent from 68 percent, while his support among whites dropped to 57 percent from 78 percent. More than four in 10 voters doubted his honesty, empathy, and transparency.

Despite this lack of support, Adrian Fenty's 2010 mayoral campaign was able to raise a record amount of money. On July 31, 2009, prior to Vincent C. Gray entering the race, Fenty's campaign had already exceeded its 2006 primary fundraising total of $2.4 million. By August 2010, Fenty had raised $4.7 million and Gray had raised only $1.3 million, though later it would be revealed that the Gray campaign was also running a $668,800 shadow campaign financed by Jeffery Thompson.The shadow campaign orchestrated on Gray's behalf became the subject of a lengthy federal investigation. In March 2014, prominent D.C. businessman Jeffrey E. Thompson pleaded guilty in federal court to two counts of conspiracy for illegally funneling more than $660,000 in unreported corporate funds into a covert campaign operation supporting Gray's 2010 bid, in addition to illegal contributions to other local and federal candidates. Prosecutors alleged at Thompson's plea hearing that Gray had personally requested the funds and had referred to Thompson by the code name "Uncle Earl" to conceal their communications, allegations Gray denied. Seven individuals connected to Thompson or affiliated with the Gray campaign pleaded guilty to federal charges in the course of the investigation. Prosecutors ultimately declined to charge Gray himself, citing concerns about Thompson's credibility as a potential witness.

Council Chairman Vincent C. Gray officially entered the mayoral race on March 30, 2010, after long anticipation and speculation about his entrance. Running on the slogan "One City. Leadership We Need", Gray proclaimed that "DC can do better" to a crowd gathered at the Reeves Center the day of his announcement. Some voters complimented Fenty for improvements in the District since he took office, while other voters criticized him for his aloof style. Some voters believed that as mayor, Gray would bring fiscal mismanagement and poor city services that existed in the early 1990s while he worked for the District government.

In his State of the District speech, Fenty noted improvements in students' test scores and a record-low homicide rate. Fenty also discussed the new psychiatric hospital at St. Elizabeths, new housing for homeless people, and a new recreation center in Deanwood. Fenty contrasted the improvements in the District under his administration with the high crime rate and low school test scores in the 1990s. Fenty also highlighted nearly a dozen new housing projects he facilitated that brought about 11,000 affordable apartments to the District. Finally, Fenty pointed to the new supermarkets and restaurants that have opened in Wards 7 and 8 during his administration.

During an interview, Chancellor of the District of Columbia Public Schools system Michelle Rhee said that she "could not imagine doing this job without the kind of unequivocal support" from Mayor Fenty. During another interview, Rhee said that Fenty "has not disappointed me one time in the last three years. I would not work under a mayor who was not focused on education in the same way, as dedicated to making some of the really difficult decisions. I think the chairman is certainly interested in education reform. I think that he...is committed to this city and its progress, certainly. But in terms of what I'm talking about with Mayor Fenty and his willingness to make some very difficult decisions, that though may have been unpopular with the adults, they are absolutely the right thing to do for the kids and for the system, no, I haven't seen the same thing with the chairman." Nonetheless, Rhee and Fenty were unpopular with teachers and so Gray benefited greatly from the support of the teachers unions.Following Fenty's defeat in the primary, Rhee's position became untenable. On October 13, 2010, she announced her resignation at a joint press conference with Gray, describing the decision as mutual. Rhee framed her departure in terms of the city's broader needs, stating that "the best way to keep the reforms going is for this reformer to step aside." At the same event, Gray announced that Deputy Chancellor Kaya Henderson, a longtime Rhee ally, would serve as interim chancellor, and said he had asked Fenty to make the appointment formally. Rhee's tenure ended October 31, 2010. Following her resignation, Rhee went on to found StudentsFirst, a national education reform advocacy organization.

Gray's campaign released an education plan, which included holding teachers accountable for student performance and paying them accordingly, strengthening the office of the deputy mayor for education, increasing infant and toddler care, and giving a tax credit for child and dependent care. Gray said he would keep Rhee's reforms in place as mayor, but Gray did not say whether he would retain Rhee as chancellor.

Fenty criticized Gray for his record as director of the Department of Human Services during former mayor Sharon Pratt's administration. During a local radio show in July 2010, Fenty criticized Gray for mismanaging the Department of Human Services. Gray responded to the criticism, saying that he enacted several improvements as director, including in the area of homelessness.

Leo Alexander, meanwhile, criticized Fenty for allowing teachers to be fired, and he criticized Gray for doing nothing to stop the firings as Council Chair. Alexander said that both Gray and Fenty both want to keep the District generally the same as it is now. Gray responded that the Council had no authority to stop the firings, but Alexander recalled that former Council Chair John Ray had successfully done so during former mayor Marion Barry's administration. Alexander also blamed businesses who hire illegal immigrants for the District's unemployment rate.

On September 15, 2010, voters went to the polls and the District of Columbia Board of Elections and Ethics reported unofficial results, with Gray receiving 53 percent of the vote compared to Fenty's 46 percent. Gray won as much as 80% of the vote in predominantly black areas east of the Anacostia River, but did poorly in the city's wealthier northwest, winning just 13% in one Georgetown precinct.

=== Candidates ===
- Leo Alexander, former television reporter
- Sulaimon Brown, accountant and former volunteer with Fenty's 2006 campaign
- Adrian Fenty, incumbent mayor
- Vincent C. Gray, D.C. Council chairman
- Ernest Johnson, owner of a realty firm
- Calvin H. Gurley, accountant (write-in candidate)

=== Polling ===
Poll source	Dates administered	Vincent Gray	Adrian Fenty	Other	Wouldn't vote	No opinion
Clarus Research Group	August 15–16, 2010	44%	38%	18%		
The Washington Post	January 24–28, 2010	35%	31%	11%	4%	20%

In a straw poll held by Ward 8 Democrats in May 2010, Fenty received the most votes. Fenty received 69 votes, Gray received 61 votes, and Alexander received 10 votes.

In a straw poll held by the District of Columbia Democratic State Convention in June 2010, Gray received the most votes. Gray received 703 votes, Fenty received 190, Alexander received 75, and other candidates received fewer than 10 votes each.

In a straw poll held in June 2010 that was open to Democrats in Ward 3, Gray received the most votes. Gray received 174 votes, Fenty received 168 votes, and Leo Alexander received 4 votes.

A straw poll held in Ward 2 in July 2010 resulted in 97 votes for Fenty, 63 votes for Gray, 1 vote for Alexander, 1 vote for Michael T. Green, and 1 undecided vote.

Ward 4 Democrats held a straw poll in Ward 4 in August 2010. Gray received 581 votes, Fenty received 401 votes, and Alexander received 12 votes.

The Washington Post questioned the reliability of straw polls to predict the winner of mayoral elections. Prior to the 2006 mayoral election, candidates Linda W. Cropp and Michael A. Brown won straw polls, but Fenty won every precinct in the actual Democratic primary election.

=== Results ===

Gray

50–60%
70–80%
80–90%

Fenty

50–60%
60–70%
70–80%

Gray

50–60%
60–70%
70–80%
80–90%

Fenty

50–60%
60–70%
70–80%
80–90%

District of Columbia Mayoral Democratic primary 2010
Party	Candidate	Votes	%
Democratic	Vincent C. Gray	72,648	54.27
Democratic	Adrian Fenty (incumbent)	59,524	44.47
Democratic	Leo Alexander	908	0.68
Democratic	Ernest E. Johnson	317	0.24
Write-in		248	0.19
Democratic	Sulaimon Brown	209	0.16
Total votes		133,854	100.00

== Other primaries and candidates ==
=== Republican ===
No Republican filed to run for the office, but Mayor Fenty received 822 write-in votes. Because Fenty was not a registered Republican on primary day, he was ineligible for the Republican nomination.

=== Statehood Green ===
Statehood Green primary results by ward: Faith—50–60% Write-ins 50–60% Write-ins 60–70% Write-ins 70–80%

The Statehood Green Party candidate was Faith Dane, activist and former Broadway performer. She was the only candidate to file and though she received fewer votes than write-ins in the primary, she was the nominee.

Statehood Green primary election, 2010
Party	Candidate	Votes	%
DC Statehood Green	Faith Dane	200	39.53
Write-in		306	60.47
Total votes		506	100

=== Socialist Workers Party ===
The Socialist Workers Party candidate was Omari Musa.

=== Independent ===
Carlos Allen, former CEO of Hush Society Magazine, a philanthropic online magazine, ran for mayor as an independent.

Also running as an independent was former NBC 4 reporter Leo Alexander.

== General election ==
Fenty endorsed Gray and said he had no interest in running as a Republican or independent. Because he was not registered as a Republican on primary day, he was ineligible to be the Republican candidate. A "Write In Fenty" website was started in October 2010 calling on voters to write in Fenty's name on the November ballot.

Vincent Gray won the general election with over 70%, with write-in votes (mostly for Fenty) at over 20%. The three other candidates on the ballot (Carlos Allen, Faith, and Omari Musa) each won less than 2%.

=== Results ===
District of Columbia Mayoral election, 2010
Party	Candidate	Votes	%
Democratic	Vincent C. Gray	97,978	74.20
Write-in		29,599	22.42
Independent	Carlos Allen	2,279	1.73
DC Statehood Green	Faith Dane	1,476	1.12
Socialist Workers	Omari Musa	717	0.54
Total votes		132,049	100.00
Democratic hold			

== Endorsements ==
=== Leo Alexander ===
- Eagle Forum, socially conservative organization
- National Organization for Marriage, organization opposing same-sex marriage

=== Adrian Fenty ===
==== Newspapers ====
- The Washington Post, editorial board
- Washington Hispanic, Spanish-language newspaper, editorial board
- The Washington Examiner, editorial board
- Washington City Paper, editorial board

==== Organizations ====
- Laborers Local 657, construction union
- Greater Washington Board of Trade

==== Individuals ====
- Anthony A. Williams, former mayor of the District of Columbia
- Jack Evans, Council member, Ward 2
- Muriel Bowser, Council member, Ward 4
- Jared Polis of Colorado, Democratic member of the U.S. House of Representatives
- Tammy Baldwin of Wisconsin, Democratic member of the U.S. House of Representatives
- Barney Frank of Massachusetts, Democratic member of the U.S. House of Representatives
- Michael Bloomberg, mayor of New York

=== Vincent Gray ===
==== Newspapers ====
- The Current, publisher of newspapers in Northwest D.C., editorial board
- InTowner, D.C. newspaper, editorial board
- The Afro, D.C.-area newspaper, editorial board

==== Organizations ====
- Fraternal Order of Police, local chapter
- D.C. Lodge of the Fraternal of the Police, local and federal chapter
- D.C. Firefighters Association, Local 36
- American Federation of Labor and Congress of Industrial Organizations
- American Federation of Government Employees
- Gertrude Stein Democratic Club
- D.C. Chamber of Commerce
- D.C. Tenants Advocacy Coalition
- District of Columbia Nurses Association
- D.C. Latino Caucus

==== Individuals ====
- Sharon Pratt, former mayor of the District of Columbia
- Harry Thomas Jr., Council member, Ward 5
- Mary Cheh, Council member, Ward 3
- Marion Barry, Council member, Ward 8, and former mayor of the District of Columbia
