= StudentsFirst =

Organizations established in 2010

- Founded: 2010
- Founder: Michelle Rhee
- Type: Political lobbying
- Purpose: Teacher evaluation based on student achievement, ending teacher tenure and seniority preferences
- Location: Washington, D.C.
- Region served: United States
- Key people: Michelle Rhee
- Website: studentsfirst.org

StudentsFirst was a political lobbying organization formed in 2010 by Michelle Rhee, former school chancellor of Washington D.C. public schools, in support of education reform. The organization worked to pass state laws on issues such as expanding charter schools and teacher tenure reform. On March 29, 2016, it announced that it would merge with 50CAN, and that Marc Porter Magee, the founder and CEO of 50CAN, would serve as CEO of the merged organization.

== Policy positions ==
StudentsFirst organized its policy agenda into three categories: "elevate teaching," "empower parents," and "govern well."

Under what it called "elevate teaching," StudentsFirst sought to eliminate the "last in, first out" seniority system for laying off public school teachers, based on the premise that such a system promotes a sense of "adult entitlement" among teachers. The organization also supported teacher evaluation systems based on improvement in student test scores, and did not believe such assessment systems cause teachers to alter the test scores.

"Empower parents" encompassed policies that allow for increased choice in where a student attends school, such as increasing accessibility to charter schools and providing opt-out options for students whose local public school is deemed "low-performing." StudentsFirst supports parent trigger laws, such as the California law that served as the plot for the movie Won't Back Down.

"Govern well" referred to policies regarding to school spending and resource allocation.

In January 2013, StudentsFirst published a "policy report card" evaluating each of the 50 states' public educations laws and rules against its own policy agenda. The survey suggested states publicly finance charter schools, institute test-linked "performance pay packages" for teachers, repeal laws capping class sizes, and end teacher tenure. No state received an "A" and only two states, Florida and Louisiana, received "B"s.

== Political activity ==
According to the Los Angeles Times, StudentsFirst "spent nearly $2 million" in the 2012 general election cycle "to support 105 candidates across the country," 90 of whom were Republicans. From 2012 to 2013, future New York State Assemblyman Micah Lasher served as its Executive Director.

StudentsFirst supported the Student Success Act, legislation signed into law by Governor Rick Scott of Florida; Michigan legislation that will remove a teacher's tenure status after a bad evaluation; and similar proposals in Georgia, Indiana, Minnesota, Nevada, Ohio, Pennsylvania, and Tennessee. The organization's activities have been the subject of significant coverage with articles appearing in the Huffington Post, National Public Radio, Education News Colorado, The Washington Post, The New York Times, and USA Today.

The organization received seed money from the Eli and Edythe Broad Foundation, a backer of educational reform in school districts. As of May 2011, it had 21 staff members, and planned to engage in lobbying, the drafting of legislation and the backing of candidates for elected office.

In October 2011, StudentsFirst launched an initiative to defend Michigan Republican Paul Scott against a recall effort, dedicating nearly $70,000 to the initiative. Scott's opponent in the upcoming race, Bobbie Walton, said StudentsFirst's involvement in the local election was "evidence of a national push to discredit teachers unions." On November 8, 2011 Scott was recalled.

Former chairman Joseph P. Watkins was named Receiver of Schools in Chester, Pennsylvania in 2012.

== Board of directors ==
As of September 2013, the members of StudentsFirst's Board of Directors were

- Joel I. Klein
- Roland S. Martin
- Eva Moskowitz
- Michelle Rhee
- Jalen Rose
- Blair Taylor

== Funding ==
Appearing on The Oprah Winfrey Show in 2010, Rhee announced a goal of raising $1 billion and garnering one million members. In actuality, the organization reported it have raised $7.8 million in its first fiscal year and $28.5 million in its second.

StudentsFirst received funding from Michael Bloomberg as well as the Laura and John Arnold Foundation. The latter committed $20 million to the initiative in 2012, to be paid out over a five-year period.

== See also ==
- The New Teacher Project
- Teach for America
