= Clifford B. Janey =

American educator (1946–2020)

Clifford Janey

Superintendent of Newark Public Schools
- In office 2008–2011
- Preceded by: Marion Bolden
- Succeeded by: Cami Anderson

Superintendent of District of Columbia Public Schools
- In office 2004–2007
- Preceded by: Paul Vance
- Succeeded by: Michelle Rhee (Chancellor)

Superintendent of the Rochester City School District
- In office 1995 – May 2002
- Preceded by: Manuel Rivera
- Succeeded by: Manuel Rivera

Personal details
- Born: June 28, 1946; Boston, Massachusetts, U.S.
- Died: February 13, 2020 (aged 73); Washington, D.C., U.A.
- Spouse(s): Phyllis (divorced) Janaya Majied (died) Barbara (m. 2003)
- Children: 5, including Kim
- Education: Northeastern University (BA, MA); Boston University (EdD)

Clifford B. Janey (June 28, 1946 – February 13, 2020) was an American educator who served as superintendent of District of Columbia Public Schools, Newark Public Schools, and Rochester City School District.

== Early life and education ==
Janey was born June 28, 1946, in Boston, Massachusetts, in the Roxbury neighborhood. He graduated from Boston Latin School and Northeastern University, the latter in 1969. He attended Northeastern again for his master's degree, which he received in 1973 for reading and elementary education. In 1984, he received a doctorate from Boston University in education policy, planning and administration.

== Early career ==
Janey worked in Boston Public Schools as a teacher, a middle school principal, and an area superintendent, and chief academic officer.

== Superintendent of the Rochester City School District ==
Janey departed from Boston Public Schools in 1995, when he was hired to serve as the superintendent of the Rochester City School District, the public school system of Rochester, New York. He held this position until 2002.

In Rochester, Janey collaborated with union leader Adam Urbanski to create a "peer assistance and review" process to support and evaluate teachers. Despite their work together, in 2002, Urbanski would publicly blast measures Janey proposed to close a large gap in the district's budget as "draconian".

Janey failed to develop a strong working relationship with Mayor William A. Johnson Jr.

Janey created specific "performance benchmarks" for the school district to pursue. Upon Janey's death, Justin Murphy of the Democrat and Chronicle described this action as, "forward-thinking as a school reform measure, even if the district never actually attained its goals for student achievement."

During his tenure, the district launched its pre-kindergarten program, which has received much praise.

Janey's departure in 2002 took place amid a budget crisis. A number of midyear budget gaps had occurred over the course of his tenure. Embattled, Janey reached a mutual agreement with the school board to leave his position in May 2002, two years prior to his contract's expiration.

== Superintendent of District of Columbia Public Schools ==
In 2004, Janey was hired by Mayor Anthony A. Williams to serve as superintendent of the District of Columbia Public Schools, which was beset with troubles. He was highly anticipated, when he was hired, as prospectively leading a turnaround of the school system. When he was hired, was the sixth person in a ten-year period to hold the position of superintendent. Janey would later describe the school system he inherited leadership of as being dysfunctional.

Janey received credit for implementing stringent academic standards about what needed to be taught at each grade level in the school system. During his tenure, the number of students taking Advanced Placement courses and the number of high school graduates who went on to attend college rose. Nevertheless, many problems in the district persisted.

Janey created the D.C. Education Compact, which consisted of government leaders, community activists, educators, union officials, business leaders, and philanthropic leaders. This group advised him on his strategic plan for the district.

In 2007, Janey departed from the position at the request of Mayor Adrian Fenty, who claimed that he desired a change of leadership at the top of the school district, wanting to see "radical change" in the school system. He was succeeded by Michelle Rhee.

== Superintendent of Newark Public Schools ==
In 2008, Janey became the superintendent of Newark Public Schools In 2011, Governor Chris Christie informed Janey that his three-year contract would not be renewed.

Under Janey, the Brick Avon Academy was created. This school implemented an approach wherein teachers elect a group from among themselves to make decisions on the school's curriculum, budgeting, and hiring.

== Later career ==
Janey worked as a research fellow at the Bank Street College of Education. He later worked as a research scholar at the school of education at Boston University.

== Other work ==
Janey served on the board of the Albert Shanker Institute.

== Personal life ==
Janey was divorced from his first wife, Phyllis Janey. They had two daughters, including Kaidi Grant-janey and Kim Janey, who would go on to serve as acting mayor of Boston. Janey remarried to Janaya Majied-Janey, who died in 2000. They had three children together: Tarik Janey, Tarijsha Janey, and author and entrepreneur Benjamen Janey. He remarried again to Barbara Janey in 2003.

Janey died on February 13, 2020, at his residence in Washington, D.C. His widow, Barbara Janey, said that his death was due to a heart ailment.
