= Kim Janey =

American politician (born 1965)

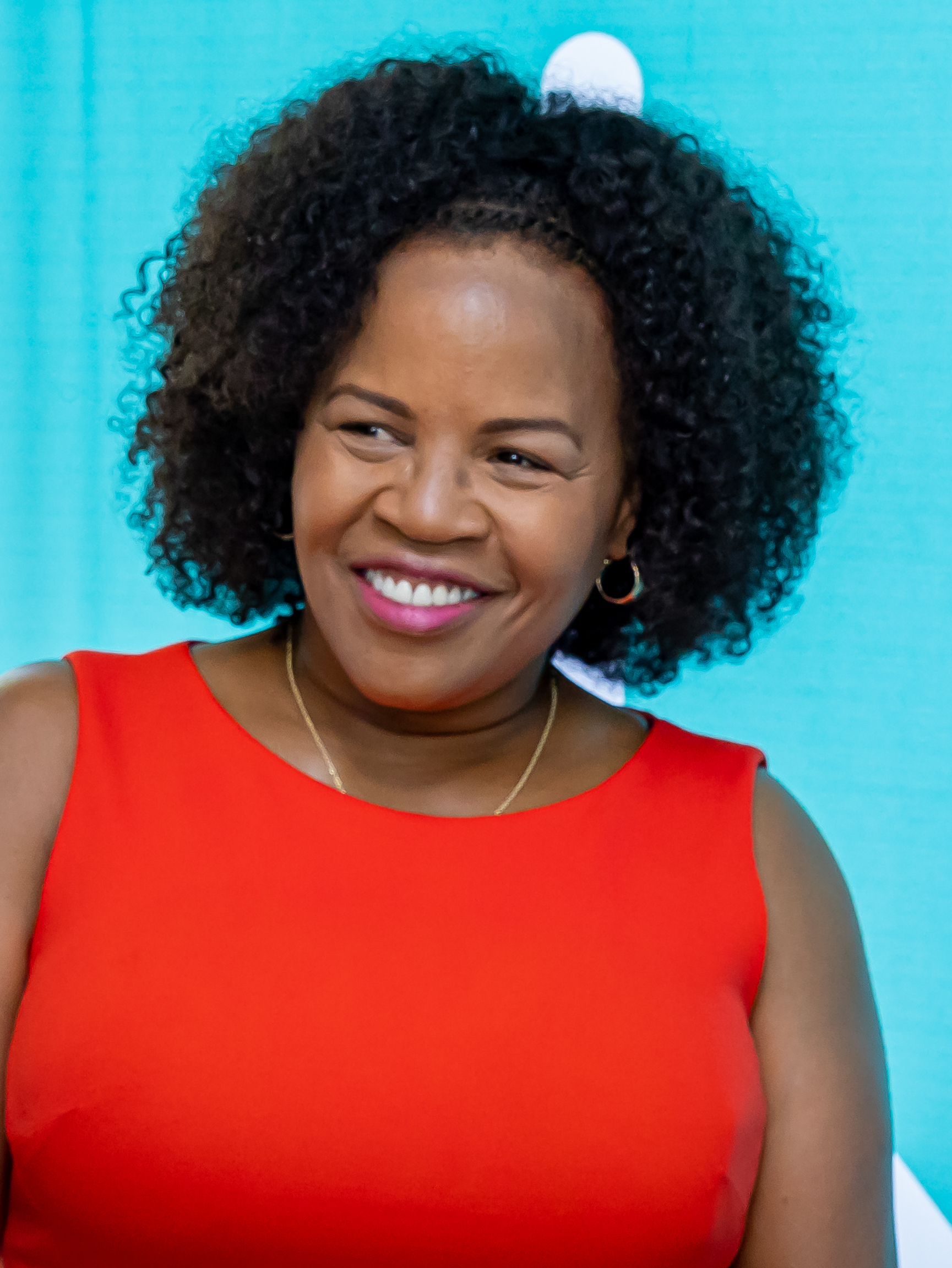
- Janey in 2023

Mayor of Boston
- Acting; March 22, 2021 – November 16, 2021
- Preceded by: Marty Walsh
- Succeeded by: Michelle Wu

President of the Boston City Council
- In office January 2020 – January 3, 2022
- Preceded by: Andrea Campbell
- Succeeded by: Ed Flynn

Member of the Boston City Council from the 7th district
- In office January 2018 – January 3, 2022
- Preceded by: Tito Jackson
- Succeeded by: Tania Fernandes Anderson

Personal details
- Born: May 16, 1965 (age 61) Boston, Massachusetts, U.S.
- Party: Democratic
- Children: 1
- Parent: Clifford B. Janey (father)
- Education: Smith College
- Website: Official website

Kim Michelle Janey (born May 16, 1965) is an American politician, community organizer, and nonprofit executive who served as acting mayor of Boston for eight months in 2021. She served as president of the Boston City Council from 2020 to 2022, (Note: While Janey served as acting mayor, fellow city councilor Matt O'Malley was the acting president of the city council.) and as a member of the council from the 7th district from 2018 to 2022. As a black woman, her tenure as acting mayor made her the first woman and the first person of color to lead the city.

Janey began her career as a community organizer and education advocate, working for groups such as Parents United for Child Care. and Massachusetts Advocates for Children. A member of the Democratic Party and regarded to be a political progressive, she entered politics when she successfully ran for the Boston City Council in 2017. She entered the Boston City Council in January 2018, and was selected as president of the Council in January 2020. On the city council, she represented the 7th district (which includes Roxbury, with parts of the South End, Dorchester, and Fenway). Being the incumbent City Council president, she became the acting mayor of Boston upon Marty Walsh's departure from the post when he resigned after being confirmed as the United States secretary of labor. She was a candidate in the nonpartisan primary of the 2021 Boston mayoral election, but had an unsuccessful fourth-place finish. She later endorsed Michelle Wu for the general election. Wu went on to win the general election, and became Janey's successor.

As acting mayor, Janey dealt with the ongoing COVID-19 pandemic. She launched a Vaccine Equity Grant Initiative to increase awareness and access to the COVID-19 vaccine in communities that were disproportionately impacted by the pandemic. She announced a municipal eviction moratorium in August, after the United States Supreme Court overturned a federal moratorium that had been in place. She also dealt with the homelessness population in the Mass and Cass area, clearing the area's tent city towards the end of her acting mayoralty. She signed into law an ordinance which restricted the Boston Police Department's use of tear gas, pepper spray and rubber bullets, a measure similar to one which had been vetoed earlier in the year by Mayor Walsh. She launched a pilot program that made the MBTA Route 28 bus fare-free for three-months. This laid groundwork that her successor, Michelle Wu, built upon to launch an expanded fare-free bus service pilot program.

Since May 2022, Janey has served as the chief executive officer of Economic Mobility Pathways (EMPath), a Boston nonprofit which addresses poverty. She has also held teaching fellowships at Harvard University and Salem State University and worked as an executive in residence at The Boston Foundation since leaving public office.

== Early life and education ==
Kim Michelle Janey was born on May 16, 1965, in Roxbury, Boston, to Clifford B. Janey and Phyllis Janey, who divorced when she was young. Her father taught and worked as a school administrator in Boston, and would serve as superintendent of the Rochester City School District, District of Columbia Public Schools, and Newark Public Schools. The birthplaces of her ancestors include North Carolina on her mother's side, and Guyana, Virginia, Nova Scotia, and Massachusetts on her father's. One grandfather was born in Chelsea in 1915 and a great-grandfather in Medford in 1890. She "has had family in the city of Boston for six generations". Her family was well known in the Roxbury neighborhood. Janey has ancestors that escaped to Canada through the Underground Railroad before settling in Boston in the latter half of the 19th century. She is a relative of Daniel Janey (who worked as the longtime campaign manager of former Boston city councilor Charles Yancey).

When she was eleven years old, Janey attended school in Charlestown, Boston. She, along with other students, was bused from Roxbury to Charlestown as part of Boston's controversial court-mandated school desegregation plan. She later attended high school in Reading, Massachusetts, under METCO, a program that allowed city students to voluntary commute to nearby suburbs for high school. She gave birth to a daughter at the age of sixteen. While continuing to attend high school, she also held a job in order to pay for expenses related to raising her daughter. Her father ejected her from his home, and she received assistance from the local nonprofit EMPath, who allowed her to use their shelter. She was able to graduate high school, and did so with her 18-month-old daughter accompanying her at her graduation ceremony. She also volunteered for Mel King's campaign in the 1983 Boston mayoral election.

After graduating from high school, Janey worked to raise her daughter and attended community college. She entered Smith College but interrupted her studies to care for her ill grandfather after the death of her grandmother. In 1994, she participated in the Ada Comstock Scholars Program designed for students who are older than the traditional age for college students. She eventually graduated from Smith College in 1994. She suffered from housing insecurity. In order to pay for her first apartment, which was located in the Dorchester neighborhood, she made use of a Section 8 voucher.

== Career as a community organizer ==
Janey worked as a community organizer and education advocate for Parents United for Child Care. She joined the Massachusetts Advocates for Children, a nonprofit, in 2001. At Massachusetts Advocates for Children, she worked for roughly seventeen years as an activist and project director, mainly focusing on eliminating the opportunity and achievement gaps in education for children of color, children learning English as a second language, children with special needs, and children living in poverty. During her time there, she was given the position of senior project director.

Janey endorsed John Barros's candidacy in the 2013 Boston mayoral election. In 2015, Janey served on the transition team aiding Tommy Chang in his transition into the position of superintendent of Boston Public Schools.

== Boston City Council ==
Janey served on the Boston City Council from 2018 through 2022. She was regarded as a progressive member of the Boston City Council. She was a district city councilor, representing the council's seventh district. Her district was centered in the Roxbury neighborhood, and also contained parts of Dorchester, the Fenway and the South End. She dubbed her district "ground zero" for issues in the city such as economic and racial inequalities, an insufficient supply affordable housing, traffic, and the opioid epidemic. Roxbury is one of the city's most impoverished areas. As a member of the council, she focused on social justice issues and matters related to education. She supported changing the method of choosing Boston School Committee members, replacing the current system of mayoral appointment with an elected school committee.

=== First term ===
Janey was first elected to the Boston City Council in November 2017. In the September Democratic primary she led the field of thirteen candidates with 25% of the votes, and then she faced the other leading candidate, Rufus Faulk, in the general election. She won the election with 55.5 percent of the 8,901 votes cast. When she was sworn in in January 2018, she became the first woman to represent District 7 on the council.

In July 2018, Janey, along with fellow city councilors Lydia Edwards and Michelle Wu, introduced legislation that would have removed as-of-right designations for chain stores, thereby requiring a conditional use permit for a chain stores to open and operate in any area designated as a "neighborhood business district". In promotion of the proposed legislation, she said, "While chain stores also play a role in our economy, it is imperative that community members have the opportunity to weigh in on whether to allow them based on the unique circumstances of their neighborhood business district."

Janey partnered with fellow councilor Michelle Wu to probe the city's process for awarding municipal contracts, finding that only 1% municipal contracts were going to women and minority-owned vendors. These findings were the impetus for the city to start looking at ways to diversify the recipients of city contracts.

In November 2019, the City Council passed an ordinance authored by Janey, aiming to increase equity in the legal cannabis industry. The ordinance included the creation of a new oversight board to assess and vote on applications for licenses based on a set criteria. Mayor Walsh signed the ordinance into law later that month. John Jordan of the publication Globest wrote that the ordinance made the city the, "first US city to prioritize cannabis industry diversity". The ordinance changed the way marijuana dispensaries were awarded licenses by the city, establishing an independent board to review applications. Previously, licenses were awarded by the mayor's office.

Janey and fellow councilor Lydia Edwards proposed a real estate transfer tax. Negotiations with other city councilors reduced this to a 2% tax on properties valued at $2 million or more, a decrease from their original proposal of a 6% tax. In December 2019, the Boston City Council voted to adopt Janey and Edwards' home rule petition requesting that the state permit the city to impose such as tax. Mayor Walsh advanced the home rule petition to the legislature. If the petition had been authorized by the state, revenue raised from the tax (predicted to be in excess of $160 million annually) was to be placed in the city's Neighborhood Housing Trust to build affordable housing.

=== Second term and council presidency ===
Janey was reelected in November 2019 with over 70% of the votes cast in her district. In her reelection campaign, it attracted attention that she shared a campaign office with both the reelection campaign of at-large councilor Michelle Wu and the election campaign of at-large council candidate Alejandra St. Guillen. Wu and Janey were regarded to both be progressive members of the Boston City Council. After the election, Janey argued that the results, which delivered what was regarded to be the most diverse membership in the council's history, provided a political mandate for the city government to pursue more ambitious action and to work to better represent the city's population.

In January 2020, Janey was elected as president of the City Council by her fellow councilors. Janey was the third consecutive female president of the Boston City Council. She was the second black woman to serve in the role, after only her immediate predecessor Andrea Campbell. Her presidency of the council marked the first time since Bruce Bolling's 1980s presidency that a council president hailed from the Roxbury neighborhood.

In 2021, Janey and fellow councilor Andrea Campbell proposed an ordinance that would have banned employers in Boston from running credit checks on job seekers, arguing that credit checks are most detrimental to low-income applicants.

== Acting mayor of Boston ==
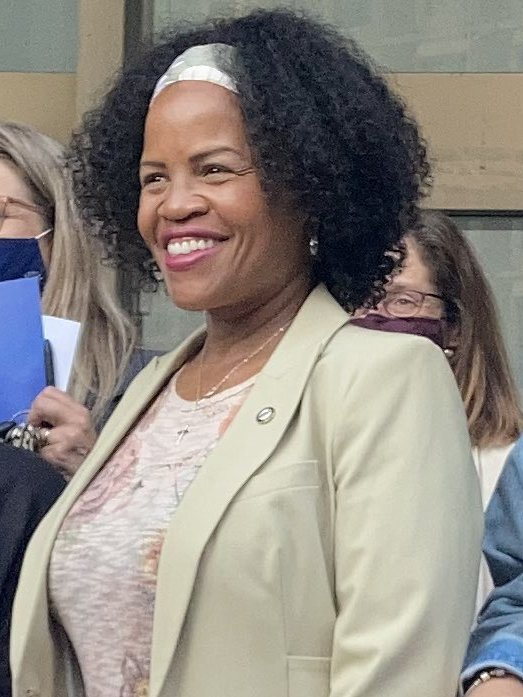
Janey as acting mayor in October 2021

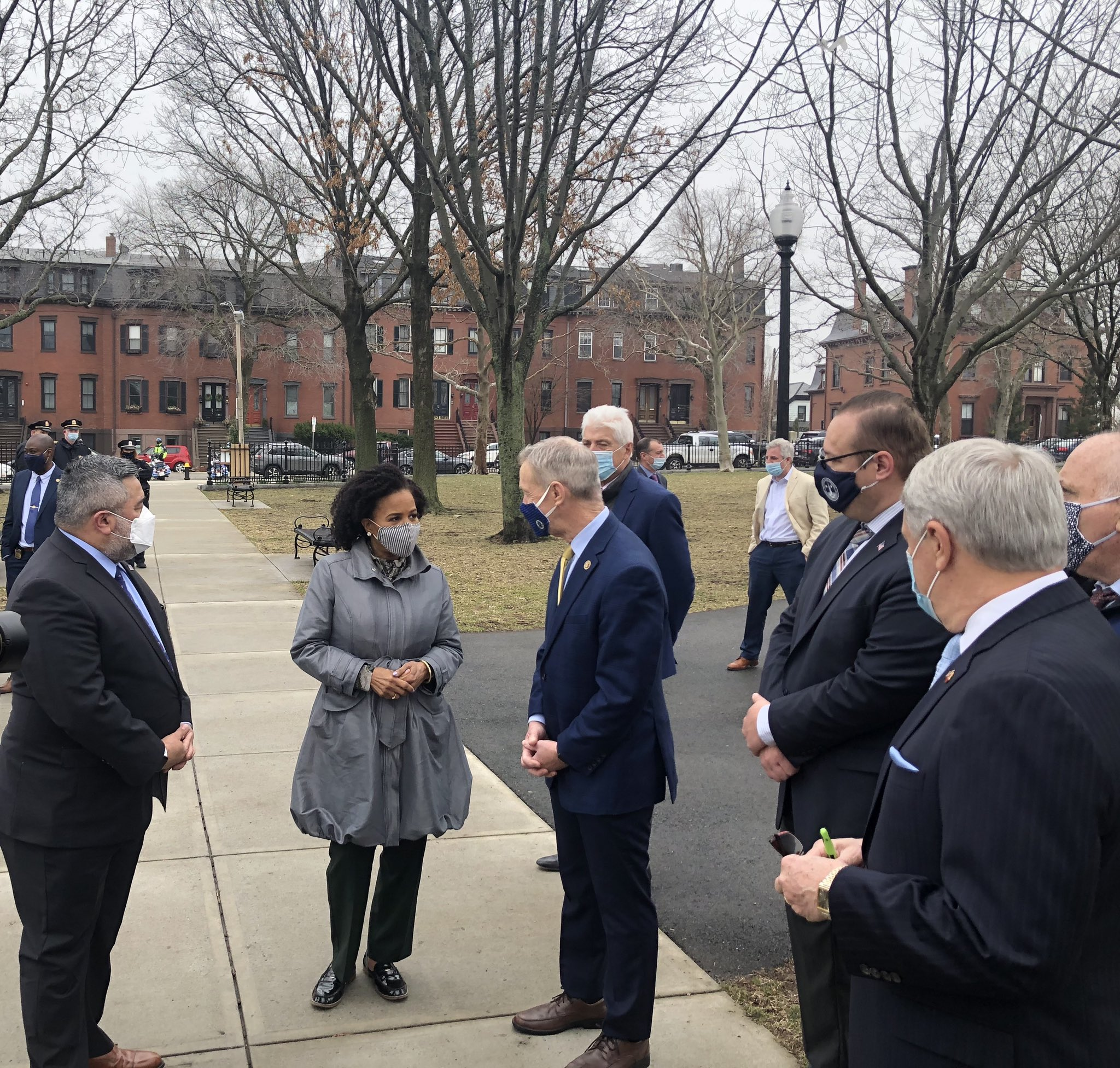
Janey speaking with Congressman Stephen Lynch, Governor Charlie Baker, and others in March 2021

On January 7, 2021, President-elect Joe Biden selected Boston mayor Marty Walsh as his nominee for Secretary of Labor. On March 22, 2021, Walsh was confirmed by the United States Senate; he resigned as mayor later that day. Janey, as president of the City Council, became the acting mayor of Boston, as prescribed by the Boston City Charter. She was the first woman and the first person of color to serve as acting mayor of Boston during a vacancy in the office. She held an unofficial swearing-in ceremony on March 24, 2021. The historic nature of her being the first woman and first person of color to hold any mayoral-style role in Boston's history caused her ascent to the role of acting mayor to receive national media attention.

Janey referred to herself as being "mayor" rather than "acting mayor", dubbing herself Boston's "55th mayor". (Note: Some media reports have also referred to Janey as the 55th mayor of Boston, but the numbering convention that deemed her predecessor, Marty Walsh, the 54th mayor was based on counting only persons elected to the role, and excluding those who served solely in an unelected acting capacity. The City of Boston's website does not explicitly number mayors.) However, the Boston City Charter distinguishes between permanent and acting mayors.

Janey, as City Council president, remained acting mayor until the 2021 Boston mayoral election in November 2021. Janey announced on April 6, 2021, her candidacy in the mayoral election. Per the Boston City Charter, acting mayors, “possess the powers of mayor only in matters not admitting of delay” and “have no power to make permanent appointments." In June 2021, amid tensions between her and the city council over budget discussions, the city council granted itself the authority to remove its president by a two-thirds majority vote. Should that action have occurred, the council would have elected a new president who would then have been designated acting mayor. During the time that she filled most of the duties of mayor on an acting basis, the duties of city council president were in turn filled on an acting basis by the council's president pro tempore, Matt O'Malley.

In April 2021, Boston magazine ranked Janey at 32nd on its 2021 "100 Most Influential Bostonians" list. They wrote that, despite the limited powers an acting mayor has under the city charter, being poised to serve as acting mayor for a significant period of time (nine-months) meant that, for her, "even mayor-lite powers are a pretty big deal, all the more so during a pandemic and economic crisis." The magazine also opined that "Janey, though not a household name in the city until very recently, has plenty of experience and savvy to make the most of this opportunity."

After Wu took office, Janey remained on the City Council until her term as a councilor expired in January 2022.

=== Transition into the role ===
By mid-February, in anticipation Walsh's confirmation, a mayoral transition was underway. By February 16, Janey had conducted around twenty briefings with key municipal staff members, including cabinet members and heads of departments. She and Walsh regularly talked, and she attended the twice weekly meetings of Walsh held with the leadership of his mayoral administration. In late February, she designated several key individuals that she would appoint as members of her senior leadership team once she assumed the role of acting mayor. In early March, she established six "Mayoral Transition Sub-Committees" to help guide her transition into the role of acting mayor. Heading one of these committees was Frederica Williams.

=== COVID-19 pandemic in Boston ===
Janey took office amid the COVID-19 pandemic.

Ahead of assuming the position of acting mayor, Janey selected Omar Boukili to serve as her senior advisor on COVID-19 response and strategic initiatives.

In March, Janey announced the Vaccine Equity Grant Initiative, which she worked to launch with the city's Office of Health and Human Services and Boston Public Health Commission. The program was aimed to increase awareness of and access to the COVID-19 vaccine in communities disproportionately impacted by the COVID-19 pandemic. The announcement of this program was her first announcement after becoming acting mayor.

In April, Janey and Boston's health and human services chief Marty Martinez announced the Boston Public Health Commission's "Hope" campaign, a multilingual public awareness campaign aiming to encourage Boston's residents to get vaccinated against COVID-19.

In early August, Janey controversially compared requiring proof of vaccination (vaccine passports) to slave papers and birtherism. She walked back this comparison days later.

On August 12, Janey announced a mandate that all municipal employees either needed to be vaccinated for COVID-19 or undergo regular COVID-19 tests. In October, she threatened that she might fire municipal employees who did not abide by this mandate.

In late August, after the United States Supreme Court overturned the federal eviction moratorium, Janey announced a municipal moratorium, which would remain in effect indefinitely until the executive director of the Boston Public Health Commission rescinds it. It bans landlords and homeowners from serving or enforcing evictions on city residents, except in cases which involve, "serious violations of the terms of the tenancy that impair the health and safety of other building residents or immediately adjacent neighbors." At the same time, Janey announced that she would direct the Department of Neighborhood Development to use $5 million of federal pandemic relief funds to create a "Foreclosure Prevention Fund" to help homeowners behind on payment to cover their expenses.

Despite calls by her mayoral election opponents Andrea Campbell and Michelle Wu to do so in August, amid rising delta variant infections, Janey opted not to implement a COVID-19 vaccine requirement for entrance to indoor establishments, such as restaurants and gyms.

=== Homelessness ===
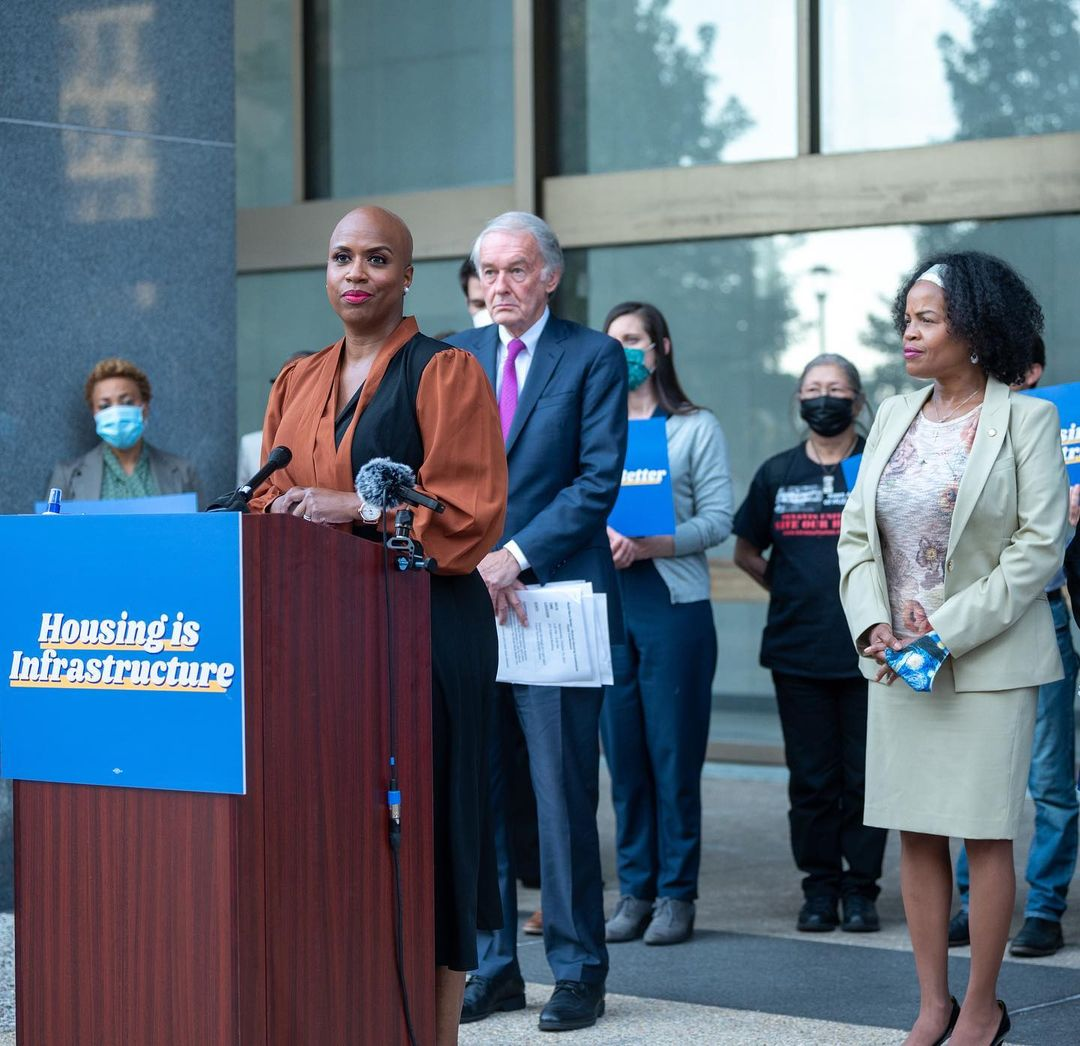
Janey (far right) at an October 13, 2021 press conference with Congresswoman Ayanna Pressley and Senator Ed Markey

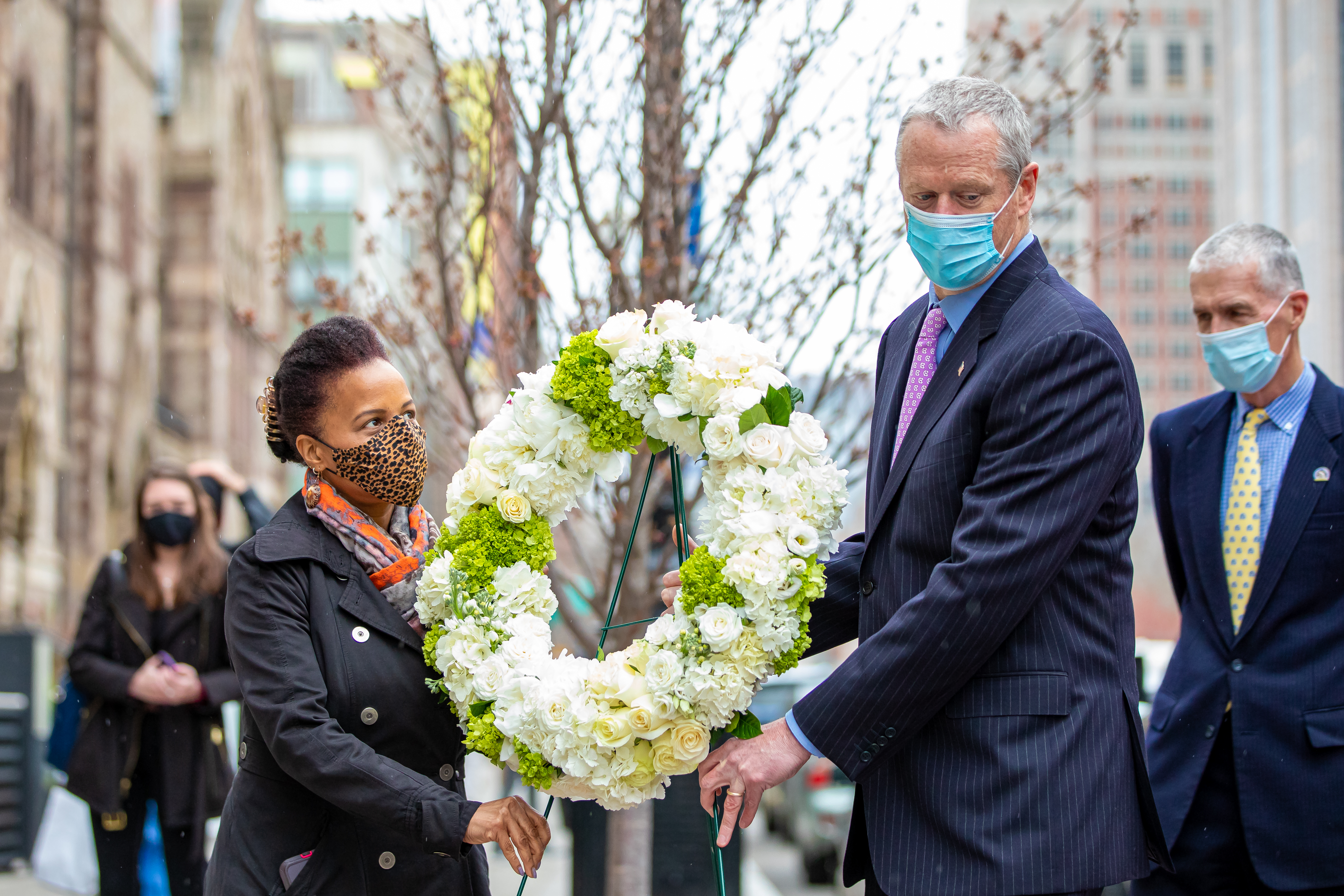
Janey and Governor Charlie Baker placing a wreath in memorialization of the eight anniversary of the Boston Marathon bombing

In late March, Janey's administration temporarily shut down the city's "comfort station" in the Mass and Cass area (also known as the "Methadone Mile"), which is the location of a large homeless population. The comfort station provided services such as bathrooms to the homeless. It reopened with changes in May, but was permanently shut in July, with Janey's office citing safety concerns.

In May, Janey stated that the city was "reviewing" the possible use of ferries to bring people to Long Island, where facilities could be used to provide services to the homeless (such facilities had been closed on the island since the 2014 closure of the bridge to it). By the end of September, she ruled this out as a viable option.

In September, Janey announced plans to house homeless people from the Mass and Cass area at a hotel in Revere, Massachusetts. However, Revere mayor Brian M. Arrigo spoke in strong opposition to that idea. However, Janey had stood by the plan.

On October 19, Janey declared homelessness and addiction a public health crisis. She also announced that she planned to remove tents from the Mass and Cass area, and relocate people into homeless shelters and treatment centers. She signed an executive order creating a "central coordinating team" of local and state officials to outline shelter and addiction treatments available in the region for those needing them. Her executive order also included the step of removing tents from Mass and Cass. The city soon after required homeless people to quickly vacate the area. Some advocates have protested her plan to clear the area's tent city. She justified it by citing the lack of hygienic facilities in tents, the sexual assaults and crime in the area, and the four or five overdoses that are reversed each day in the area. Opponents have argued that the dismantling of the tents and other makeshift structures, forcibly if necessary, effectively amounts to a criminalization of homelessness and addiction.

=== Environment ===
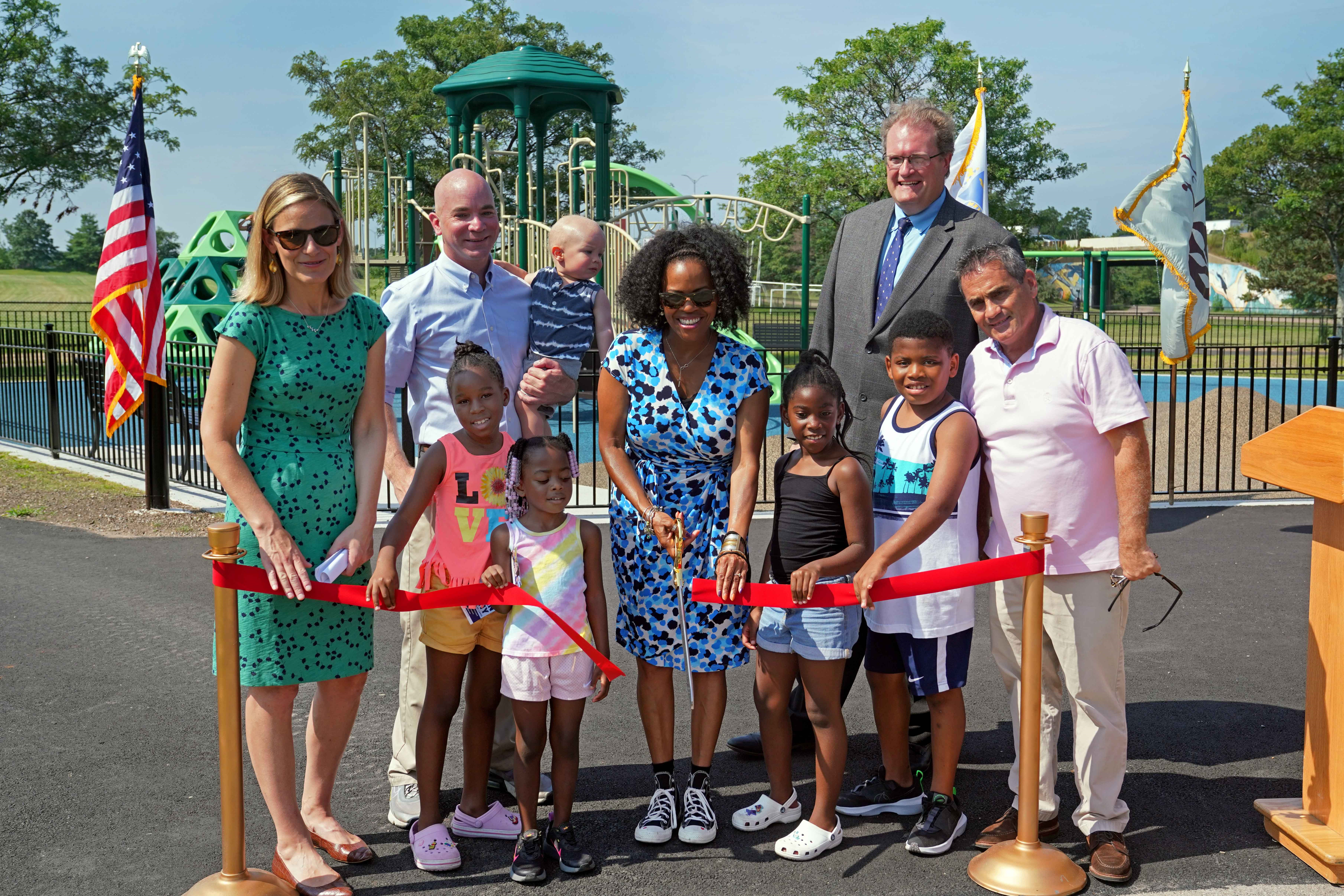
Janey at the August 2021 ceremonial ribbon-cutting of a new playground at Pope John Paul II Park

In April, Janey appointed Mariama White-Hammond as the city's environmental chief.

In late August, Janey announced that she would be moving to withdraw the Downtown Waterfront District Municipal Harbor Plan zoning plan. The plan had been previously approved in 2017. She cited concerns regarding equity and climate resiliency. However, weeks later, Governor Charlie Baker threatened that state officials would reject Janey's withdrawal, unless the city submitted a replacement plan.

On October 5, Janey signed into law the Building Emissions Reduction and Disclosure Ordinance (BERDO), an ordinance requiring buildings in the city that are larger than 20,000 square feet to reach net-zero carbon emissions by the year 2050, and setting emissions reporting requirements for such buildings.

During Janey's mayoralty, the city began to explore the possibility of creating a climate bank through the Boston Green Ribbon Commission public-private partnership. This would be funded through a grant from the Bank of America Corporation, which is a member of the Boston Green Ribbon Commission.

=== Policing ===
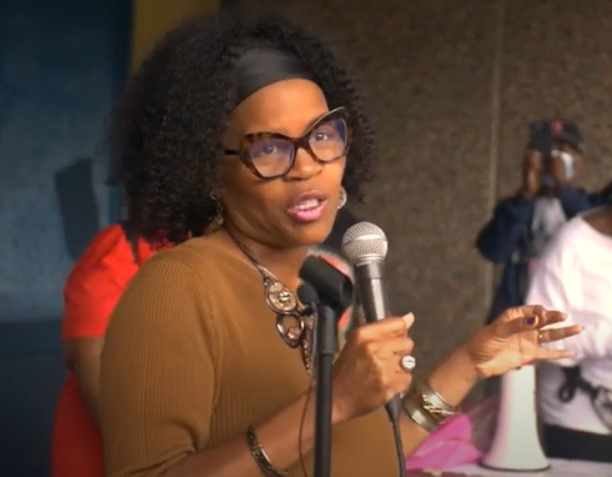
Janey at the 2021 Roxbury Unity Parade

In April, Janey named Stephanie Everett to be head of the city's new Office of Police Accountability and Transparency, which was created in accordance with an ordinance that Walsh had signed into law earlier that year.

In May, Janey signed into law an ordinance which restricted the Boston Police Department's use of tear gas, pepper spray and rubber bullets. Such a measure had been vetoed earlier in 2021 by Mayor Walsh. Around the same time, she announced that she had directed the city to drop its legal defense of a Boston Police Department promotion exam that had been criticized by opponents as "racially discriminatory". She ordered the city to move to reach a settlement in the years-long litigation surrounding the exam. This move followed both pressure from mayoral election opponents and a story in The Boston Globe on the lawsuit.

Also in May, a report from an independent probe was released, finding Police Commissioner Dennis White to have had a pattern of alleged domestic violence. After this, she attempted to oust White, who had already been suspended by Mayor Walsh months earlier. White took legal action, challenging her authority as acting mayor to fire him. The Superior Court sided with Janey soon after, though White attempted unsuccessfully to appeal the ruling. In June 2021, she formally terminated White's employment. White later sued for wrongful termination. In 2022, most of the counts he was suing on were thrown out by a judge, though the remaining counts were cleared to proceed.

In June, the Boston City Council approved Janey's 2022 budget, which included a $399 million police budget. This marked a reduction from the previous year's budget. The budget reduced police overtime from $65 million to $45 million. Her office claimed that their long-term plan would be to add 30 more officers to the police force, claiming that doing so would help to cut down on overtime expenses. While it passed, aspects related to policing did receive vocal criticism from some members of the city council. For instance, Councilor Andrea Campbell argued that it did too little to push police reform. Councilor Kenzie Bok argued that it should do more to push a decrease in police overtime spending.

In early August, Janey announced plans to fund a pilot program that would see EMTs and mental health personnel respond without the assistance of police to 9-1-1 calls on mental health matters that are not a public safety concern. The plan was established by the city's Mental Health Crisis Response Working Group, as well as the Boston Police Department and the Boston Office of Health and Human Services at her urging.

=== Transit ===
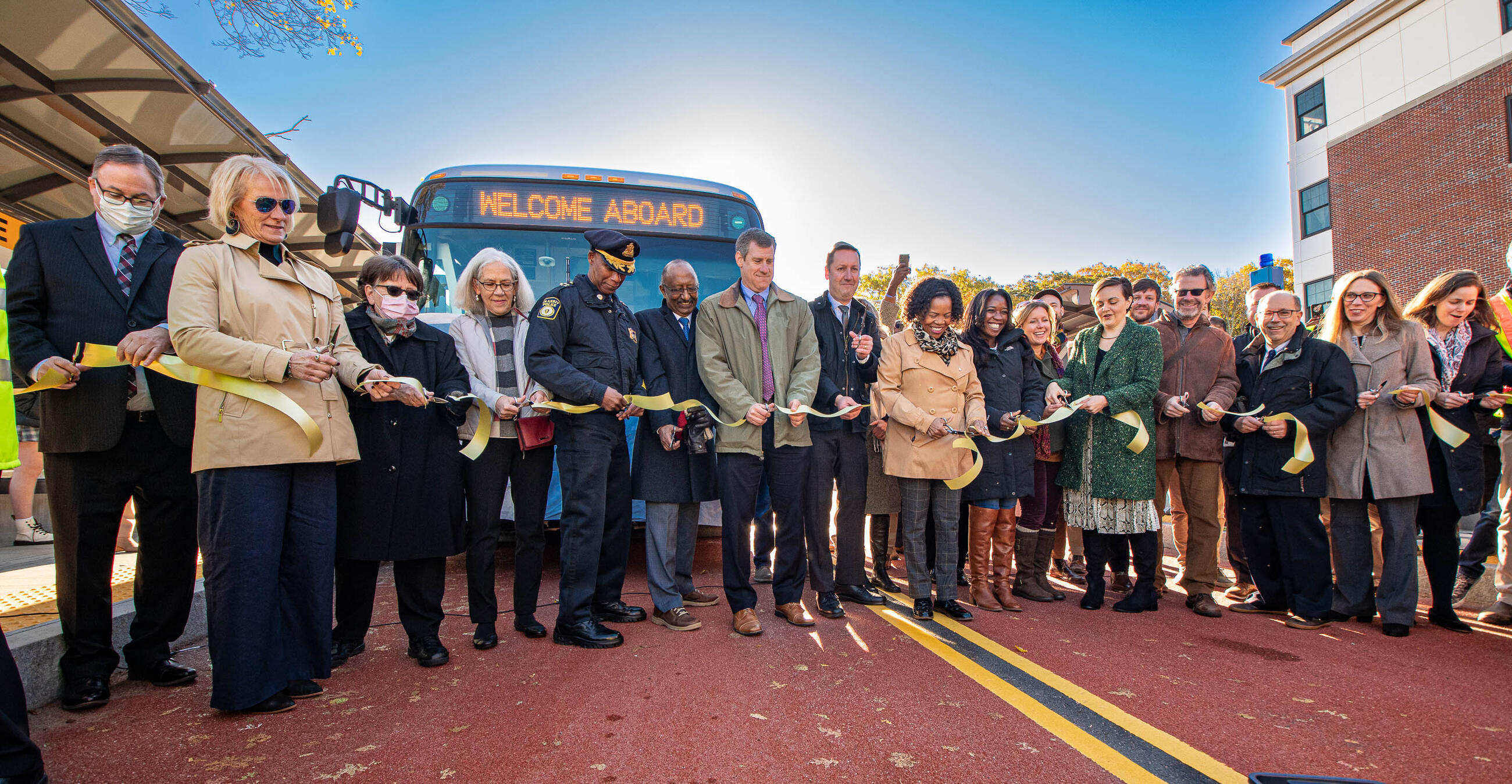
Janey (near center) at the November 2021 ribbon cutting ceremony for bus lanes on Columbus Avenue

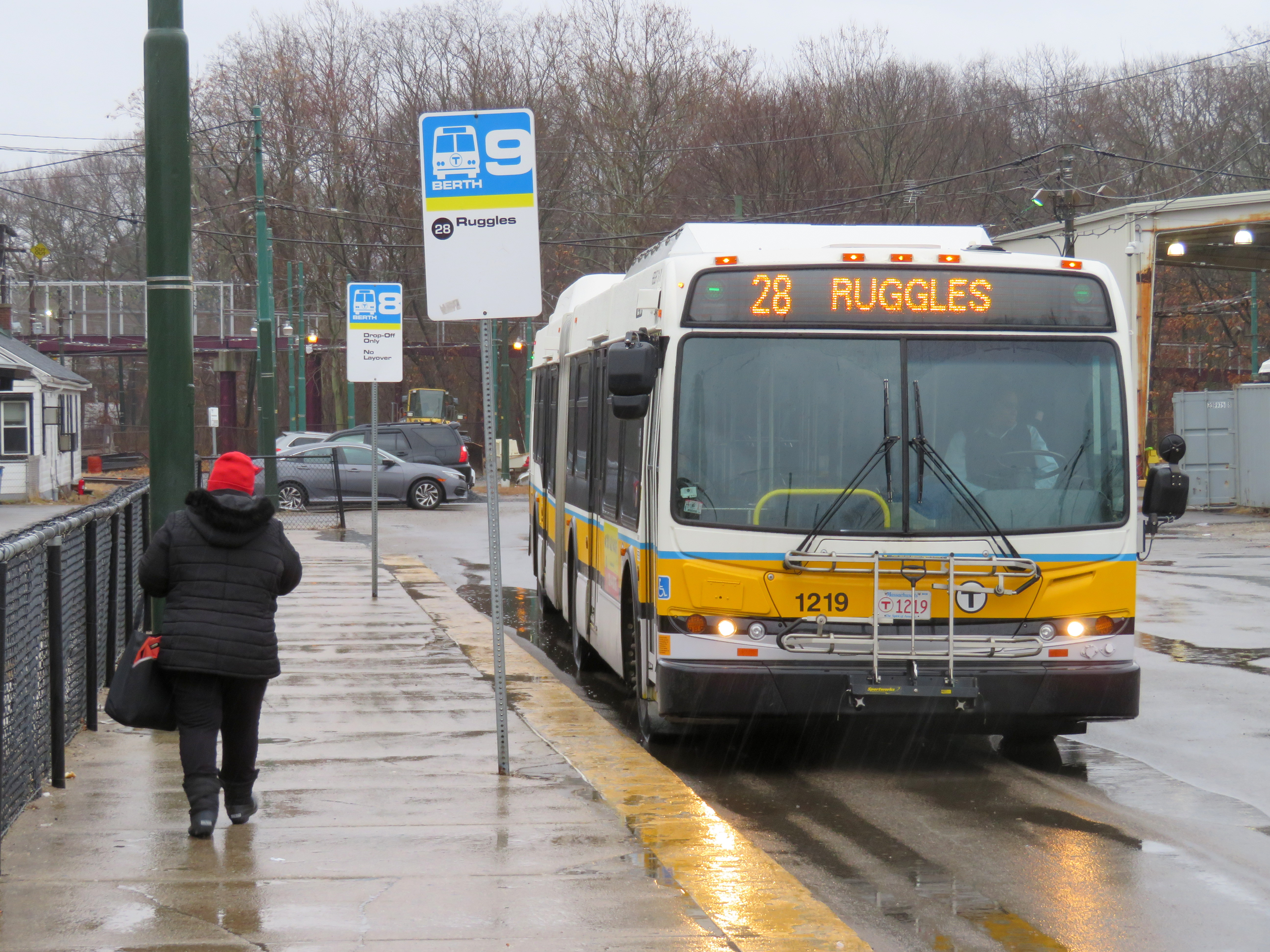
During Janey's acting mayoralty, the city funded a pilot program which made the MBTA Route 28 bus (pictured) fare-free for a three-month period.

Soon after becoming acting mayor, Janey advocated for the MBTA to return to its pre-pandemic service levels.

In March, Janey announced a pilot program that would offer 1,000 workers in five of the city's business districts (East Boston, and Fields Corner, Jamaica Plain, Mission Hill, Nubian Square, Three Squares) free MBTA and Bluebikes passes with up to $60 in credit.

In June, Janey announced that the city would be funding a $500,000 three-month pilot that would see the MBTA's Route 28 bus be made fare-free. In 2019, as a city councilor, she and fellow councilor Michelle Wu had previously called for this. The city, in November 2021, announced that its data showed that during the pilot program ridership had increased to an excess of 70,000 in weekly ridership. Pre COVID-pandemic weekly ridership on the route had been 47,000, making the COVID-era pilot program ridership significantly greater despite the general impact of the COVID-19 pandemic on public transportation rider. The city concluded that, in comparison to ridership trends on comparable routes of the MBTA, the increase in ridership was directly attributable to the pilot program. A later more in-depth 2022 analysis found an overall 38% increase in weekday ridership from 7,500 before the pandemic to 10,200 during the September and October periods during the pilot program. The pilot program laid the groundwork to further fare-free bus service in the city implemented by her successor Michelle Wu. In December 2021, after Wu succeeded Janey, Wu extended the pilot program by two months. Wu later succeeded in launching a two-year program to have the MBTA Route 23, 28, and 29 buses run fare-free for two years, with this program beginning on March 1, 2022.

=== Other matters ===
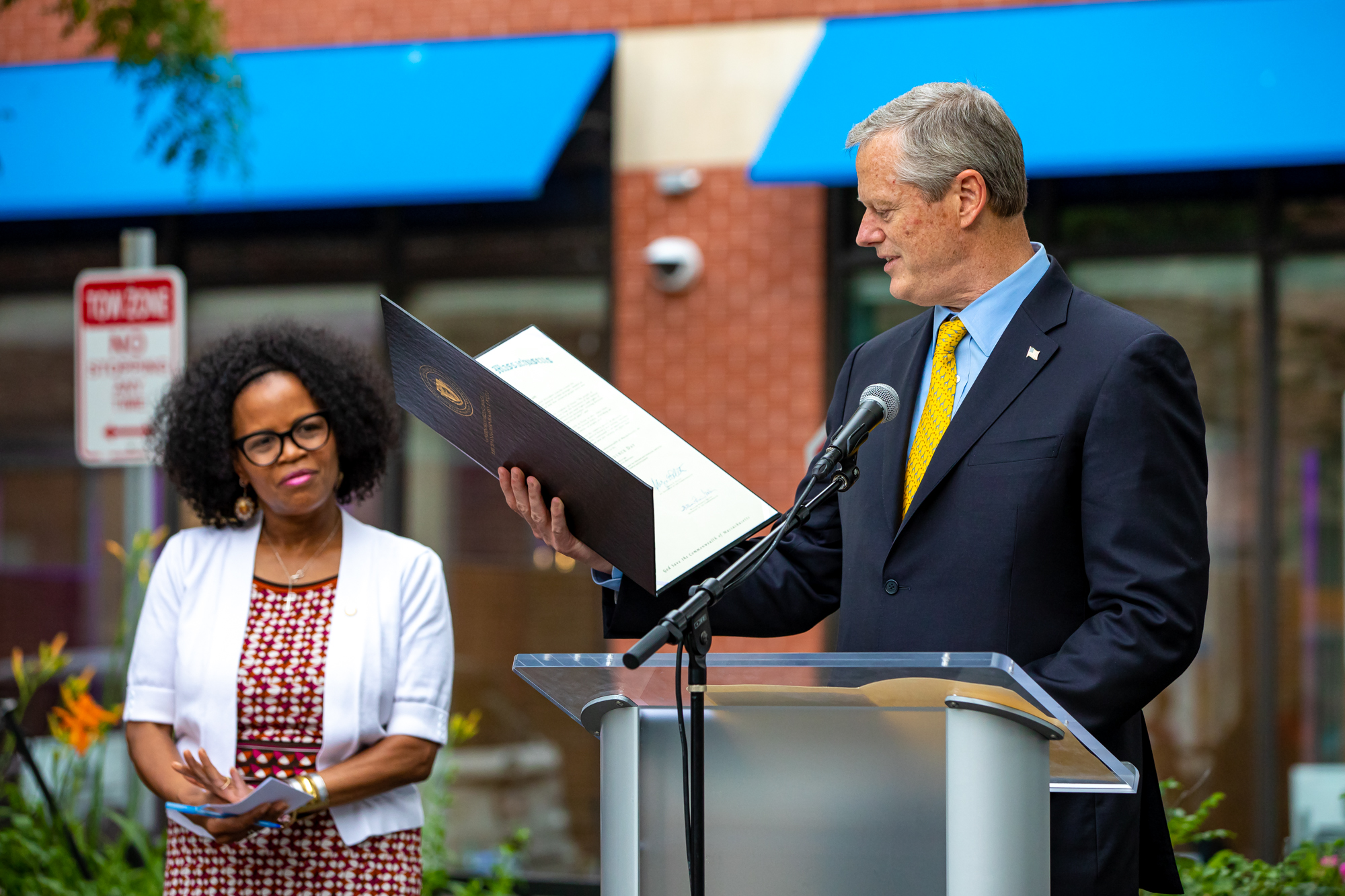
Janey with Governor Charlie Baker at a Juneteenth celebration

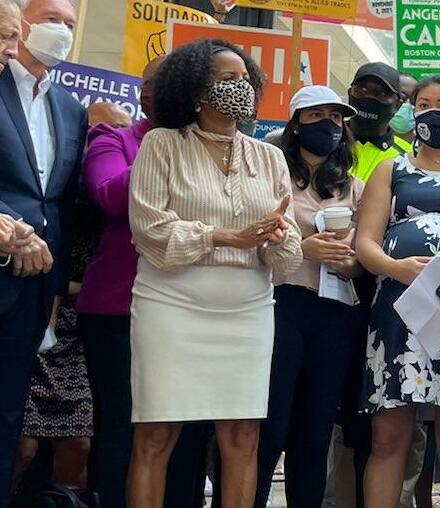
Janey attending a Labor Day event, joined by Senator Ed Markey (left)

In May, Janey signed an ordinance into law which would move the nonpartisan primary for the 2021 Boston mayoral election, in which she was a declared candidate, from its originally-scheduled date of September 21, to the date of September 14.

In June, Janey announced that the total amount an individual first-time homebuyer could receive in assistance from the city would expand significantly to $40,000. She also signed an executive order awarding city contractors state prevailing wages.

In June, two female Latina American Boston School Committee members resigned over a scandal involving racially-charged text messages that they had sent about White West Roxbury residents. Stating that their resignations left a "void in Latina leadership" on the Boston School Committee, Janey pledged that she would appoint Latina replacements, a promise she fulfilled the following month.

In June, Janey signed an ordinance that would allow for there to be a binding referendum on the ballot in the November 2021 municipal general election as to whether the city charter provision relating to the municipal budget should be amended. Among the changes proposed in the amendment was giving the City Council the powers to line-item veto some of the items in a budget put forth by the mayor, amend a mayor's proposed budget both in whole and in part, and override a mayoral veto of a budget by a two-third's vote. These changes provide the City Council with more powering the creation of a budget. Another change in the amendment was creating an Office of Participatory Budgeting, giving the city's residents more power in the creation of city budgets. Weeks later, State Attorney General Maura Healey cleared the referendum for inclusion on the ballot. The referendum saw the amendment approved by voters, thereby amending the city charter.

In September, Janey signed into law an ordinance creating a city commission on Black men and boys. The Boston City Council had previously approved the creation of such a commission in 2014, but it had been vetoed by Mayor Walsh.

On October 6, Janey signed an executive order replacing the city's recognition of the second Monday in October as "Columbus Day" with a recognition of the day as "Indigenous Peoples' Day".

On October 22, 2021, Janey sent a letter to the United States Census Bureau to announce the city's intention to challenge the 2020 United States census results for the city, alleging that the city's population had been undercounted. As mayor, Janey's successor Michelle Wu would subsequently pursue a litigation against the United States Census Bureau on these grounds.

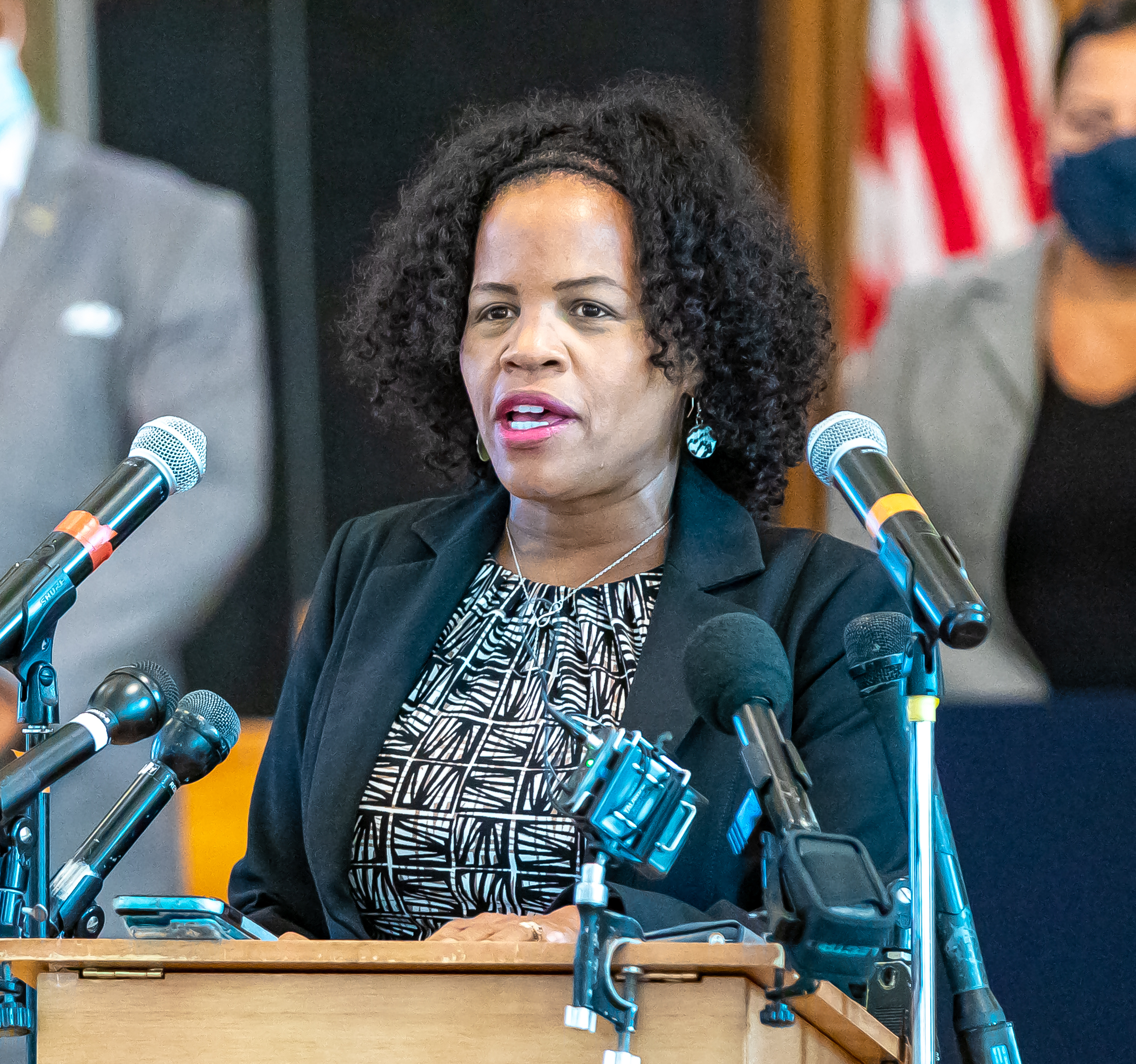
Janey speaking during a September 2021 event at the Twelfth Baptist Church

In September, Janey signed into law an ordinance that amended the city's existing paid child leave law, changing the wording of the existing law from "stillbirth" to "pregnancy loss", and also extending paid family leave to those welcoming a new family member (such as through surrogacy or adoption) or acting as a caregiver.

During Janey's tenure, some city signage was installed that included her name. Many signs in the city have conventionally listed who the mayor was at the time the sign was installed.

=== Mayoral campaign ===
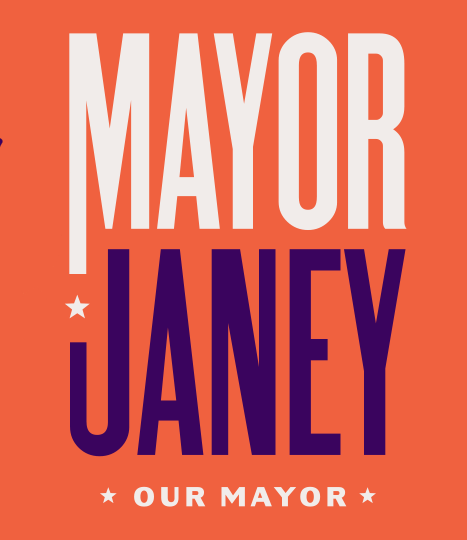
Mayoral campaign logo

Acting Mayor Janey announced on April 6, 2021, that she would run in the 2021 Boston mayoral election. This was Janey's first citywide race, and only her third-ever campaign for public office.

Early into her campaign, she was seen as a likely candidate to advance to the general election. Her acting incumbency, and the national media attention it initially received, was perceived as being a strong advantage. During much of the summer, she was seen as gaining ground in the election, and was out-fundraising her opponents. However, Ellen Barry of The New York Times and Lisa Kashinsky of Politico have suggested that her comments in early August on vaccine passports were damaging to her momentum. By the closing weeks of the nonpartisan primary election campaign, Michelle Wu was seen as the front-runner, with Janey being perceived as competing with Andrea Campbell and Annissa Essaibi George for a second-place finish.

The video her campaign had released at its launch played-up her acting incumbency, setting a tone for her campaign, which leaned heavily into her acting incumbency. Janey made a deliberate effort to avoid use of the title "acting mayor", promoting herself as simply being the "mayor" without attaching the qualifier of "acting". In late-August, Joe Battenfeld of the Boston Herald characterized her as having run a "Rose Garden campaign", emphasizing her acting incumbency through weekly press conferences and playing a visible role in the city's response to the COVID-19 pandemic. In a post mortem look at Janey's campaign, Joan Vennochi of The Boston Globe similarly described Janey as having taken a "Rose Garden strategy", speculating that she had patterned such an approach after Tom Menino's similar approach as acting mayor, which won then-acting mayor Menino the 1993 Boston mayoral election. Vennochi argued that, unlike Menino, Janey had been cautious in governing, and, "didn't define herself or her plans for a future administration", and had been "carefully scripted" in press conferences, outside of her controversial off-hand remarks about vaccine passports. Similarly, shortly ahead of the preliminary election, Ellen Barry of The New York Times had written that, as acting mayor, Janey had, "been cautious in her new role, sidestepping hot-button issues that could hurt her in the general election, and remaining largely scripted in public appearances." It was noted in a September 1 article in The Boston Globe that she had been absent at 30 out of 60 candidate events such as forums, town halls, and one-on-one interviews to which all of the major candidates had been invited, while each of the other major candidates had attended nearly all of these events.

In running for mayor, Janey was faced for the first time with the challenge of campaigning before a city-wide electorate. As a second-term district city councilor, her only two previous election campaigns had been before the much smaller electorate of her city councilor district. In contrast, two of her opponents, Michelle Wu and Annissa Essaibi George, had been elected city-wide in the past as at-large city councilors. During the election campaign, there was an ultimately-unsuccessful effort by some Janey supporters to coalesce black support around her candidacy and away from the other two black candidates (Andrea Campbell and John Barros). In late August, Janey began airing her first television advertisements.

For her platform, Janey had outlined what she called the "HEART Agenda", with "HEART" being an acronym for housing, education, accountability, recover/resiliency, and transportation. Originally, like all other major candidates with the exception of Michelle Wu, Janey opposed rent control. However, in August, she changed her stance on the issue, and joined Wu in support of rent control. Janey supported having the state allow for the city to have the option of implementing rent control. Janey's platform also called for an equitable recovery from the COVID-19 pandemic.

Janey conceded the election shortly after midnight on the day after the primary election, when very little of the vote total had been released. When the votes finished being reported, she had placed fourth. Her defeat as the acting incumbent made her the first incumbent of any kind since 1949 to lose a Boston mayoral election. On September 25, she endorsed Michelle Wu for the general election.

=== Transition to Michelle Wu's mayoralty ===
On September 24, Janey met with mayoral general election candidates Annissa Essaibi George and Michelle Wu at the Parkman House, and the three agreed to November 16 as the tentative date for the expected transition of power for the mayoralty. After Wu won the mayoral election, Janey served as the honorary chair of Wu's mayoral transition team.

Wu became mayor on November 16, 2021, with Janey in attendance at the swearing-in ceremony. After Wu took office as mayor, Janey remained a lame duck city councilor until January 2022.

== Subsequent work ==
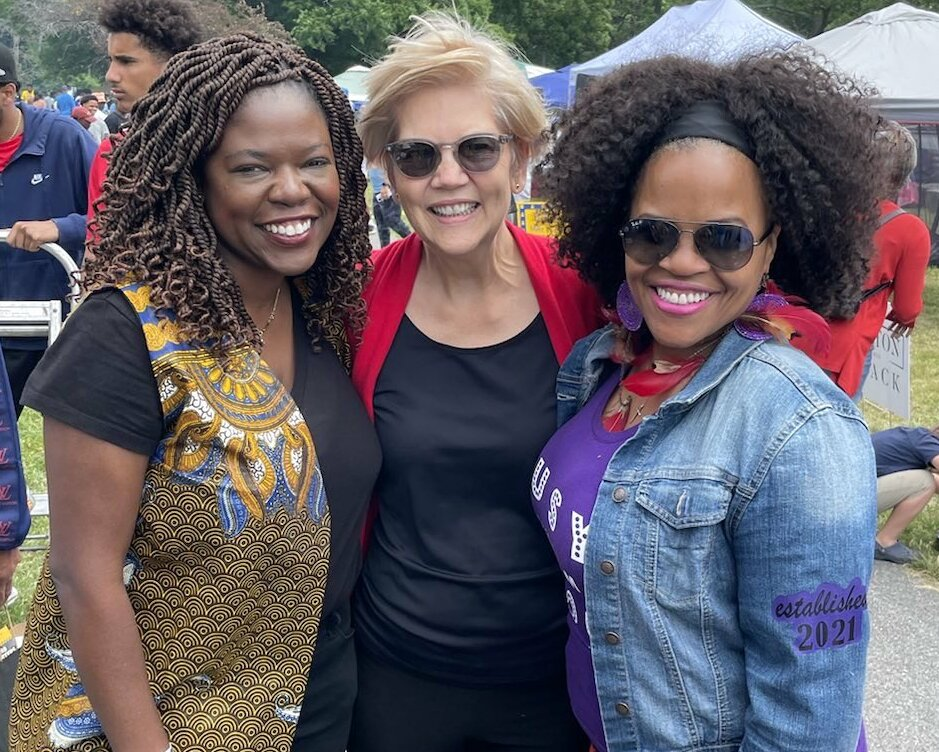
Janey (right) with Boston City Councilwoman Ruthzee Louijeune (left) and Senator Elizabeth Warren (center) at a 2022 Juneteenth event

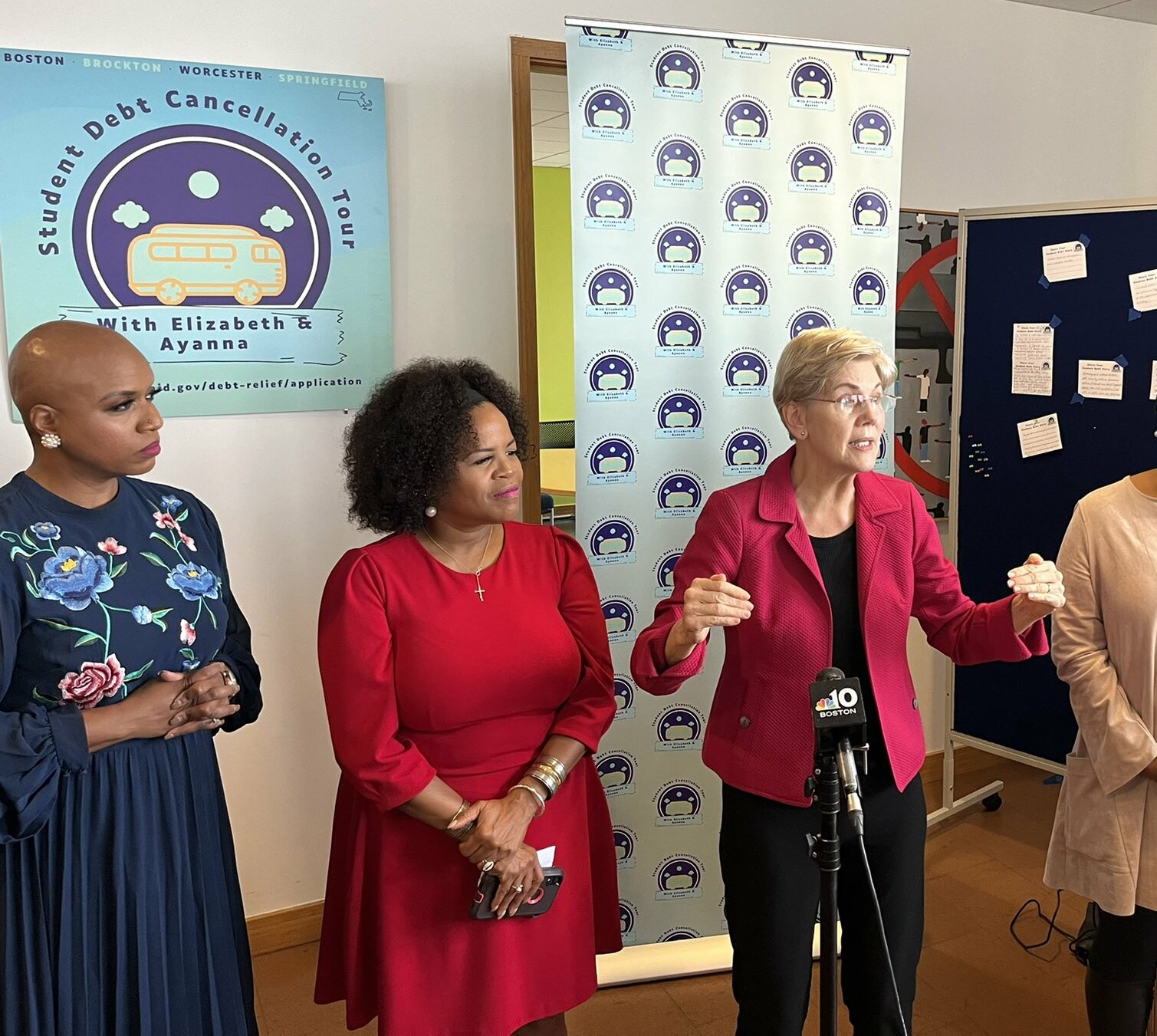
Janey (center) with Congresswoman Ayanna Pressley (left) and Senator Elizabeth Warren (right) at an October 2022 event promoting federal student loan debt cancellation

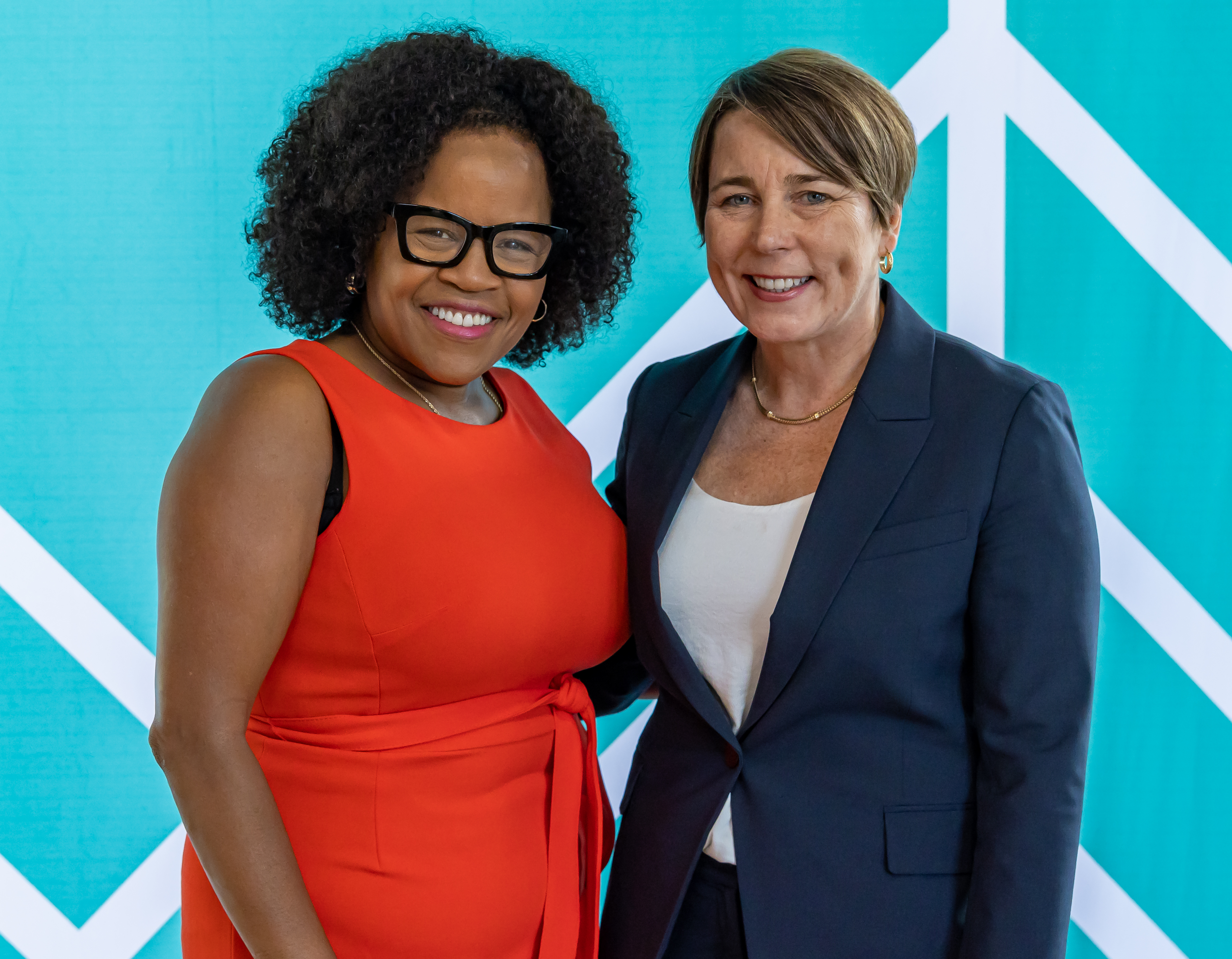
Janey (left) with Governor Maura Healey at an EMPath event in 2023

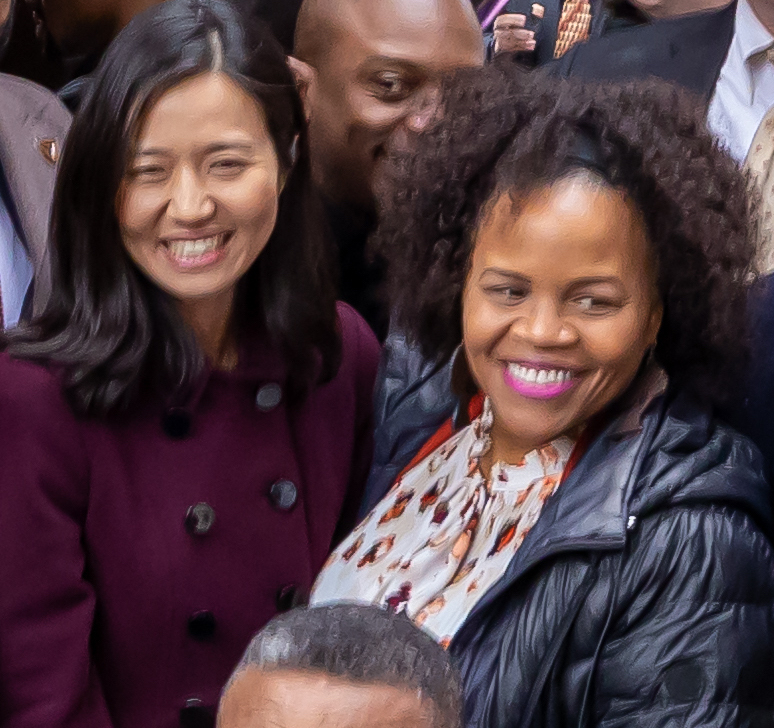
Janey (right) with Mayor Michelle Wu in 2023

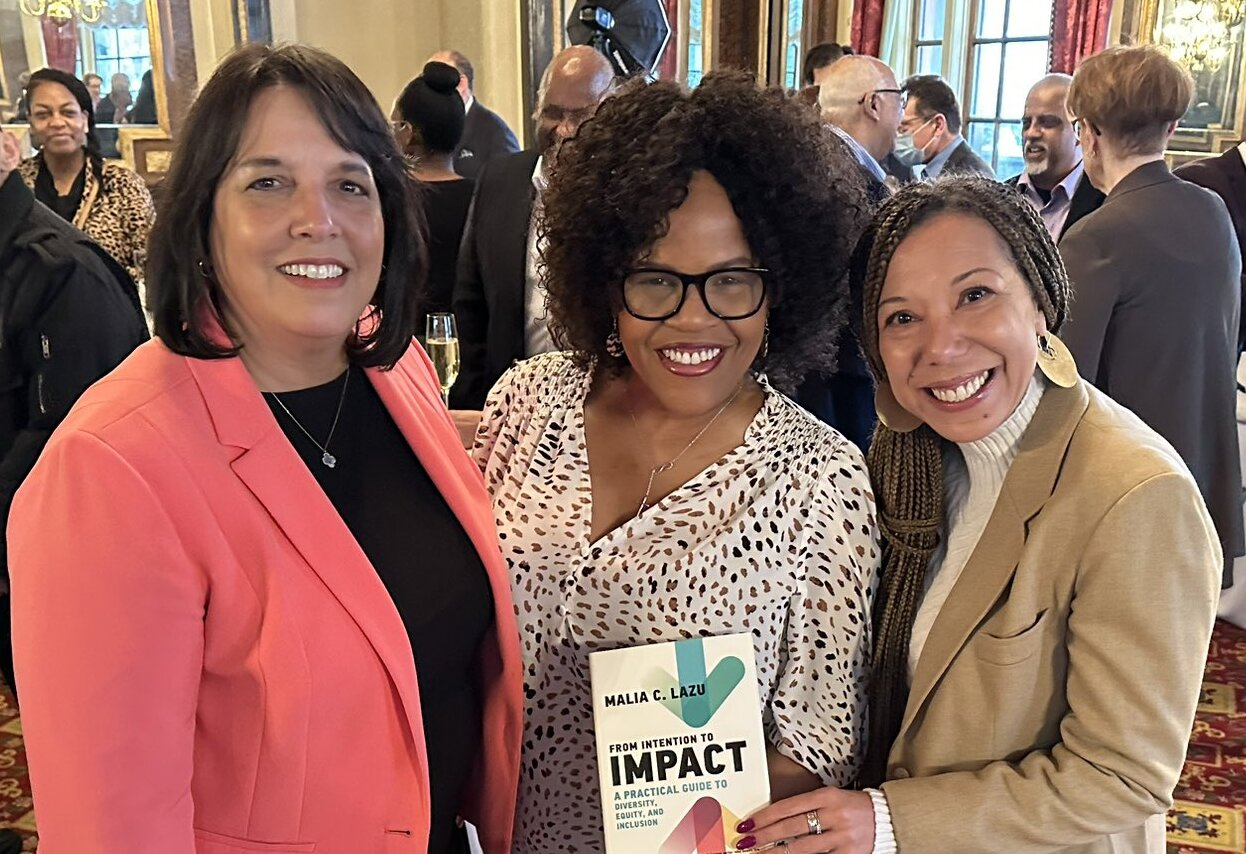
Janey with Lieutenant Governor Kim Driscoll (left) and author Malia C. Lazu (right) in 2024

=== CEO of EMPath ===
In late-May 2022, Janey was announced as the next chief executive officer of the Boston Economic Mobility Pathways (EMPath), a nonprofit focused on addressing poverty. EMPath is an "economic mobility organization". With a staff of 120, its operations include one of the' largest family emergency shelters in Massachusetts. The organization had previously been supportive of her during her political career, and she had previously received their assistance during her pregnancy at the age of sixteen. On June 1, 2022, she began her tenure, succeeding Beth Babcock, who had led the nonprofit for sixteen years before retiring.

In December 2022, with Janey at its helm, EMPath announced progress on AMP Up Boston, a three year study and program begun in December 2021, which will see Boston Housing Authority residents receive individualized mentoring in support of their efforts towards achieving economic independence. The program received the support of Mayor Wu.

=== Other work ===
In early March 2022, Janey joined The Boston Foundation community foundation, being appointed to a one-year term as an executive in residence. She was tasked to work with the foundation's president and chief executive officer, M. Lee Pelton, on a project related to documenting, preserving, and promoting awareness of historical landmarks located in neighborhoods of Boston with large populations of people of color.

In the spring 2022 academic semester, Janey served as a teaching fellow at both Harvard University and Salem State University. At Harvard, she was a resident fellow of the Harvard Institute of Politics. At Salem State University she was a fellow at the Berry Institute of Politics. In its fall 2022 semester, Janey was a teaching fellow at the Harvard T.H. Chan School of Public Health.

=== Political activities ===
To a degree, Janey has remained involved in politics. For example, she endorsed the unsuccessful campaign of Shannon Liss-Riordan in the Democratic primary of the 2022 Massachusetts attorney general election.

In January 2024, Janey was a member of a coalition of groups and individuals that filed a challenge to Donald Trump's inclusion on the presidential ballot in Massachusetts. The coalition argued that Trump was ineligible to hold the office and be included on the ballot, arguing that Trump had "engaged in insurrection or rebellion" while president as described in Section 3 of the Fourteenth Amendment to the U.S. Constitution. The objections were dismissed by the Massachusetts State Ballot Law Commission.

== Personal life ==
Janey lives in the Roxbury neighborhood of Boston, where she also grew up.

Janey gave birth at age sixteen to a daughter, Kimesha. Janey has three grandchildren.

== Awards ==
In 2015, Janey received the Boston NAACP Difference Maker Award. In January 2020, she received the Hubie Jones Award from the Boston Children's Chorus. She received an honorary doctorate in fine arts from the Massachusetts College of Art and Design (MassArts) at their 2022 graduation ceremony, at which she was the commencement speaker. In 2023, she and her mayoral successor Michelle Wu were given the Boston Arts Academy Foundation's "Champion Award".

== Electoral history ==
=== City Council ===
2017 Boston City Council 7th district election
Candidate	Primary election		General election	
Candidate	Votes	%	Votes	%
Kim Janey	1,534	25.00	4,942	55.47
Rufus J. Faulk	719	11.72	3,856	43.28
Deeqo M. Jibril	605	9.86		
Domonique A. Williams	593	9.66		
Charles Clemmons Muhammad	423	6.89		
Roy Owens	370	6.03	29†	0.33
Jose Lopez	363	5.92		
Brian S. Keith	348	5.67		
Hassan A. Williams	285	4.65		
Joao Gomes Depina	299	4.87		
Carlos Tony Henriquez	263	4.29		
Angelina Magdalena Camacho	247	4.03		
Steven A. Wise	64	1.04		
all others	23†	0.38	83†	0.93
Total	6,136	100	8,910	100

† write-in votes

2019 Boston City Council 7th district election
Candidate	Primary election		General election	
Candidate	Votes	%	Votes	%
Kim Janey (incumbent)	2,147	69.96	3,856	74.47
Roy Owens Sr.	517	16.85	1,296	25.03
Valarie Hope Rust	381	12.42		
all others	24†	7.82	53†	1.02
Total	3,069	100	5,178	100

† write-in votes

=== Mayor ===
2021 Boston mayoral election
Candidate	Primary election		General election	
Candidate	Votes	%	Votes	%
Michelle Wu	36,060	33.40	91,794	63.96
Annissa Essaibi George	24,268	22.48	51,125	35.62
Andrea Campbell	21,299	19.73		
Kim Janey (acting incumbent)	21,047	19.49		
John Barros	3,459	3.20		
Robert Cappucci	1,185	1.10		
Jon Santiago (withdrawn)	368	0.34		
Richard Spagnuolo	286	0.26		
Scattering	0	0.00	595	0.41
Total	107,972	100	144,380	100

== Commentaries and op-eds authored ==
- "Hello, Boston — It's a New Day for the City" –published March 23, 2022 in The Boston Globe
- "As Our City Reopens and the Weather Gets Warmer, I Encourage Everyone Who Can to Support Our Small Businesses" –published May 26, 2021 in the East Boston Times–Free Press
- "Economic Equity Is Key in Boston's Efforts to Recover from the Pandemic" –published June 24, 2021 in the North End Regional Review
- "Direct cash assistance is a proven way to support struggling families" –published October 15, 2022 in The Boston Globe

== See also ==
- History of African Americans in Boston
- List of first African-American mayors

== Notes ==
Political offices
Preceded by Andrea Campbell	President of the Boston City Council; 2020–2022	Succeeded by Matt O'Malley; Acting
Preceded by Marty Walsh • (tenure) •	Mayor of Boston; Acting; 2021	Succeeded by Michelle Wu • (tenure) •
