= Kevin S. Huffman =

American educator and attorney

22nd Commissioner of the Tennessee Department of Education
- In office April, 2011-January, 2015
- Governor: Bill Haslam
- Preceded by: Lana C. Seivers
- Succeeded by: Candice McQueen

Personal details
- Born: September 22, 1970 (age 55) Tennessee, U.S.
- Spouse: Michelle Rhee (div. 2007)

Kevin S. Huffman (born September 22, 1970) is an American lawyer and education administrator who was the Commissioner of the Tennessee Department of Education. He was appointed to the position by Tennessee Governor Bill Haslam and served from April 2011 to January 2015. Prior to his work at the Tennessee Department of Education, Huffman held a senior management position in Teach for America and had worked as an attorney specializing in education.

Huffman resigned as Tennessee Commissioner of Education on November 13, 2014, noting that he has plans to work as a private consultant and plans to continue living in Nashville.

== Career ==
Huffman graduated from Bexley High School in Bexley, Ohio, in 1988. He then attended Swarthmore College, receiving a B.A. in English literature in 1992.

He began his career in education after graduation, becoming a Teach For America corps member in Houston, Texas. He taught bilingual first- and second-grade students in English and Spanish for the Houston Independent School District. He was a member of his school's elected shared-decision making committee, and trained new teachers as a faculty advisor and school director at Teach For America's summer training institutes.

After finishing his assignment as a teacher for Teach for America, Huffman attended New York University School of Law, where he was a member of the law review and graduated in 1998. After law school, he joined the Washington, DC, law firm of Hogan & Hartson, where he represented school districts, state departments of education and universities, and worked on policy and litigation matters including challenges to state finance systems, desegregation litigation, and special education hearings and trials.

In 2000, Huffman became a staff member for Teach For America. In more than a decade with that organization, he served as general counsel, senior vice president of growth strategy and development, and executive vice president of public affairs.

In 2009, Huffman was voted "America's Next Great Pundit" by The Washington Post, where he had an opinion column from 2009 to 2010.

In March 2011, Tennessee Governor Bill Haslam announced that he was appointing Huffman to head the state's Department of Education. Huffman started work in April 2011. He was the first Teach For America participant to assume the leadership of a state's public education program.

In his first months as head of the Tennessee Department of Education, Huffman oversaw the implementation of a new evaluation system for teachers and school principals that seeks to provide a comprehensive look at educator performance based on multiple measures of effectiveness, including classroom observations, student academic growth, and locally selected measures of student achievement. He has called the evaluation system, which requires targeted feedback for teachers, "a model for the rest of the country."

Also in his time at the Tennessee Department of Education, Tennessee became one of the first states receive a waiver from the Federal Elementary and Secondary Education Act (ESEA) (also known as No Child Left Behind), and he continued the focus on higher college- and career-ready standards through the Tennessee Diploma Project and the Common Core State Standards Initiative.

Huffman was also instrumental in creating the state's Achievement School District (ASD), which aims to move the bottom 5% of school in TN to the top 25% by 2018. In its first year, the ASD saw a drop in reading proficiency but also saw improvements in both math and science achievement.

Under his tenure, Tennessee saw the largest academic gains in a single testing cycle since the National Assessment of Educational Progress (NAEP) started nationwide assessments a decade ago, along with impressive gains for African American students. Additionally, from 2009-2013, the number of ACT test-taking graduates increased by 33.8%, while the number of graduates in Tennessee decreased by 2.2%.

His time as Commissioner was not without controversy - in September 2012, he ordered that $3.4 million in state funding be withheld from Metropolitan Nashville Public Schools after its school board refused to authorize a proposed Great Hearts Academies charter school in West Nashville. In September 2013, a petition was sent to the governor, signed by 55 of the states' school directors, alleging that Huffman was not responsive to local school officials and had contributed to low teacher morale and other problems.

As an advocate of charter schools, Huffman oversaw an increase from 29 public charter schools when he took office to 71 schools in the 2013-2014 school year. In December 2014, Tennessee was ranked 2nd of 17 states for its charter school policy environment that promotes both quality and accountability.

Huffman also oversaw consistently improved student achievement on the state's annual Tennessee Comprehensive Assessment Program (TCAP). As of 2014, nearly 50 percent of Algebra II students were on grade level, an improvement from 31 percent in 2011. Additionally, achievement gaps for minority students narrowed in math and reading at both the 3-8 and high school levels. He also led efforts to create a differentiated compensation system for educators in Tennessee. This system gives local districts more control and flexibility over their pay systems, allowing them to address and reward teachers for their various roles and contributions. Huffman also created a structure to provide more than 30,000 Tennessee educators with insight and training on teaching the Common Core State Standards.

== Family ==
While teaching, Huffman met fellow Teach for America Corps member Michelle Rhee. The couple married two years after they met and had two daughters before they divorced in 2007.
