= Kaya Henderson =

American educator and activist

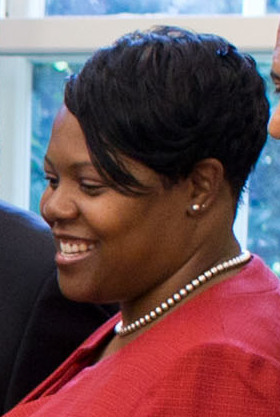

Chancellor of District of Columbia Public Schools
- In office November 2010 – September 2016
- Preceded by: Michelle Rhee
- Succeeded by: John Davis (Acting)

Executive director of Teach for America
- In office 1997–2000

Vice President for Strategic Operations of New Teacher Project
- In office 2000–2007

Member of the board of directors of Georgetown University
- Incumbent
- Assumed office 2014

Personal details
- Born: 1970 (age 55–56) Mount Vernon, New York, U.S.
- Education: Georgetown University (BA, MEd)

Kaya Henderson (born July 1, 1970) is an American educator, activist, and civil servant who served as Chancellor of the District of Columbia Public Schools (DCPS) from November 2010 to September 2016.

== Education and early career ==
Kaya Henderson was born in 1970 in Mount Vernon, New York, and graduated from that city's public schools.

Henderson graduated from the Edmund A. Walsh School of Foreign Service at Georgetown University in Washington, D.C., in 1992. During her senior year, a friend joined Teach for America. Intrigued by why her friend would give up lucrative jobs in order to teach in inner-city schools, Henderson learned more about the organization and became convinced its goals were important to her.

In 1992, Henderson joined Teach For America, and took a job teaching in the South Bronx in New York City. Henderson was promoted to executive director of Teach for America in 1997, and relocated to Washington, D.C. In 2000, Henderson left Teach for America and joined the New Teacher Project as Vice President for Strategic Operations. While working for the New Teacher Project, Henderson returned to Georgetown University, and received an executive master's degree in leadership in 2007.

Henderson received an honorary Doctor of Humane Letters from Georgetown University in 2012, and joined the university's board of directors in 2014.

== DCPS tenure ==
Henderson was working for the New Teacher Project when Michelle Rhee, Chancellor of the D.C. public school system, tapped her in June 2007 to be Deputy Chancellor of the DCPS. Rhee resigned as Chancellor effective October 31, 2010, after her political backer, Adrian Fenty, lost renomination as Mayor of the District of Columbia in the 2010 Democratic primary. Henderson was named interim chancellor. Vincent C. Gray, Fenty's successor as mayor, appointed Henderson permanently to the job, and she was confirmed by the Council of the District of Columbia on June 21, 2011.

Henderson resigned as Chancellor effective September 30, 2016. John Davis, chief of schools, replaced her as interim chancellor.

Henderson was censured in November 2016 for an ethics violation after her departure. According to the District of Columbia Office of Government Ethics, Henderson asked Chartwells, a contractor providing breakfast, lunch, and other food to the school system, for a $100,000 contribution for an event honoring high-quality teachers in the DCPS. Chartwells had just been accused of improperly billing the school district for $19 million, and for providing spoiled food. (Chartwells later settled the lawsuit for $19.4 million.) Chartwells contributed $50,000 to the event. City ethics rules, however, prohibit employees from soliciting contributions from firms or individuals that do business with the city. The ethics investigation into Henderson's actions began in May 2016, while she was still chancellor. Henderson agreed to be censured; the Office of Government Ethics chose not to impose a fine.

On April 12, 2017, the D.C. Office of the Inspector General (OIG) found that Henderson gave preferential treatment to some city officials and members of the public by granting permission for their children to enroll in schools outside the normal attendance boundaries. Henderson defended her actions, noting that District law gives the chancellor the sole discretionary authority to approve out-of-boundary registrations and that she granted only a limited number of registrations and only when circumstances warranted it. Henderson approved transfers for Rashad Young, the City Administrator, and Courtney Snowden, the Deputy Mayor for Economic Development, but declined the request from a Vietnamese family with a deaf child who sought to attend a school with sign language instruction. In the OIG report, Henderson justified her actions by saying that city officials did not make enough money, though Young and Snowden made $295,000 and $196,000 per year, respectively.

== Post-DCPS career ==
In mid-2016, Henderson—who had acted and modeled as a child—returned to fashion modeling. She initially was interviewed by and modeled clothes for the plus-size retailer Eloquii as part of their series of interviews with high-achieving women. She modeled clothes a second time for them in late 2016.

In October 2017, Henderson was appointed a Distinguished Scholar in Residence at Georgetown University. The university said she will assist in conducting research into affordable higher education, barriers to college, racial justice, and other issues.

Political offices
Preceded by Michelle Rhee	Chancellor of District of Columbia Public Schools; 2010–2016	Succeeded by John Davis; Acting
