= Michelle Rhee =

American education reformer (born 1969)

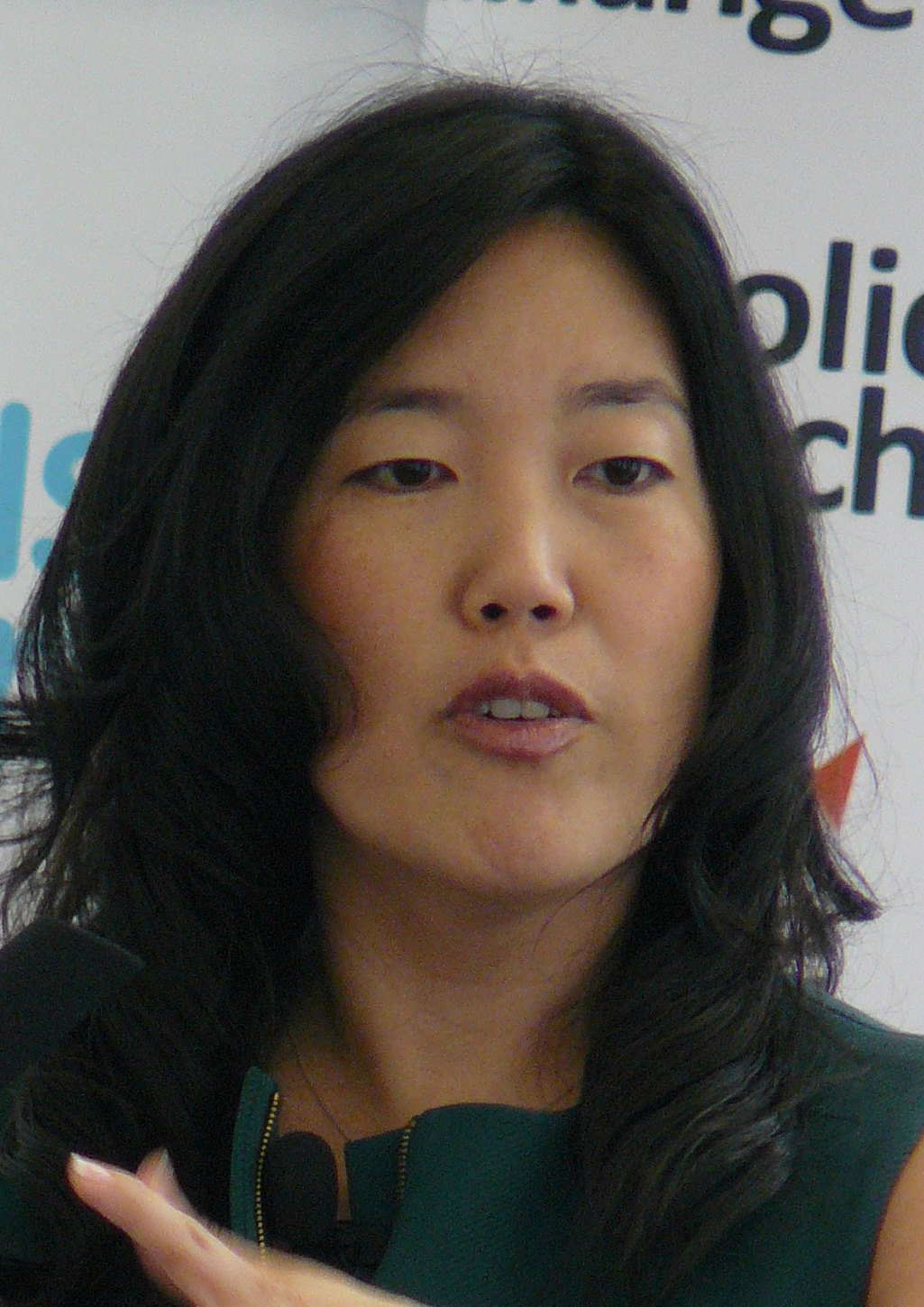
- Rhee in 2012

Chancellor of District of Columbia Public Schools
- In office June 12, 2007 – October 29, 2010
- Deputy: Kaya Henderson
- Preceded by: Clifford B. Janey (Superintendent)
- Succeeded by: Kaya Henderson

First Lady of Sacramento
- In role September 3, 2011 – December 13, 2016
- Mayor: Kevin Johnson
- Preceded by: Mary Yee
- Succeeded by: Julie Steinberg

Personal details
- Born: Michelle Ann Rhee; December 25, 1969 (age 56) Ann Arbor, Michigan, U.S.
- Party: Democratic
- Spouse(s): Kevin Huffman (divorced 2007) Kevin Johnson (m. 2011)
- Children: 2 daughters
- Education: Cornell University (BA); Harvard University (MPP)

Michelle Ann Rhee (born December 25, 1969) is an American educator and advocate for education reform. She was Chancellor of District of Columbia Public Schools from 2007 to 2010. In late 2010, she founded StudentsFirst, a non-profit organization that works on education reform.

She began her career by teaching as a Teach for America corps member for three years in an inner city school, then founded and ran The New Teacher Project.

== Early life and education ==
Rhee was born in Ann Arbor, Michigan, the second of three children of South Korean immigrants Shang Rhee, a physician, and Inza Rhee, a clothing store owner. She was raised in the Toledo, Ohio area and educated in public schools, through the sixth grade. Her parents then sent her to South Korea to attend school for one year. Upon her return, they enrolled her in a private school because they felt the public school was lacking. She graduated from the private Maumee Valley Country Day School in 1988, and went on to Cornell University where she received a B.A. in government in 1992. She later earned a Master of Public Policy from Harvard University's John F. Kennedy School of Government.

== Teaching ==
Inspired by a PBS special that she saw during her senior year in college, Rhee signed up with Teach For America, went through their five-week summer training program, then worked for three years as a teacher in Baltimore, Maryland. She was assigned to Harlem Park Elementary School, one of the lowest-performing schools. Rhee told Washingtonian magazine that she had been demoralized by her first year of teaching, but said to herself, "I’m not going to let eight-year-old kids run me out of town." She said she took courses over the summer and received her teacher's certification, then returned to teach at Harlem Park. Her "Teach For America" Training did not prepare her well to handle basic classroom management. She was so unprepared that in order to quiet down a class she taped children's mouths shut. One of the children's lips bled a little when the tape was removed.

In her second and third years of teaching, Rhee team taught a combined class of the same students with another teacher. She told The New York Times that those students had national standardized test scores that were initially at the 13th percentile but at the end of two years, the class was at grade level, with some students performing at the 90th percentile. Earlier she had said on her résumé that 90 percent of her students had attained scores at the 90th percentile. In math, her scores went from 22 percentile to 52 percentile, an average increase of 15 percentile annually. In reading, her scores went from 14 percentile to 48 percentile, an average increase of 17 percentile annually. Rhee responded that the discrepancies between the official test scores and the ones listed on her résumé could be explained by the fact that her principal at the time informed her of the gains but those results may not have been the official state tests that were preserved.

== The New Teacher Project ==
In 1997, Rhee began as the CEO of The New Teacher Project, a nonprofit that within ten years of its founding, trained and supplied urban school districts with 23,000 mid-career professionals wanting to become classroom teachers. The New Teacher Project, now called TNTP, was founded by Wendy Kopp, also the founder of Teach for America. Kopp recruited Rhee serve as CEO while Kopp was the president of the not-for-profit's board of directors. The project primarily serves New York, Chicago, Miami, and Philadelphia. Beginning in 2000, the project began redesigning the D.C. schools' recruitment and hiring processes.

== Chancellor of D.C. public schools ==
In 2007 the D.C. Board of Education was stripped of its decision-making powers and turned into an advisory body, and the new office of chancellor was created—so changes in the public school system could be made without waiting for the approval of the board. Newly elected D.C. mayor Adrian Fenty quickly offered Rhee the job of chancellor; she accepted after being promised mayoral backing for whatever changes she wanted to make. Critics noted that Rhee had no experience running a school system, and had not even been a principal. She had been highly recommended to Fenty, however, by Joel Klein, the chancellor of the New York City public schools.

Rhee inherited a troubled system; there had been six school chiefs in the previous 10 years, students historically had below-average scores on standardized tests, and according to Rhee, only 8 percent of eighth graders were performing at grade level in mathematics. The D.C. schools were performing poorly despite having the advantage of the third highest spending per student in the U.S. Fenty and Rhee announced that they planned to make revolutionary changes in D.C. schools, and that part of the planned changes was a hoped-for "grand bargain" with teachers under which "greater accountability, including an end to tenure," would be traded "for a nearly 100-percent increase in salaries."

In 2008 she also tried to renegotiate teacher compensation, offering teachers the choice of salaries of up to $140,000 based on what she termed "student achievement" with no tenure rights or earning much smaller pay raises with tenure rights retained. Teachers and the teachers union rejected the proposal, contesting that some form of tenure was necessary to protect against arbitrary, political, or wrongful termination of employment.

In 2010 Rhee and the unions agreed on a new contract that offered 20 percent pay raises and bonuses of $20,000 to $30,000 for "strong student achievement," in exchange for weakened teachers' seniority protections and the end of teacher tenure for one year. Under this new agreement, Rhee fired 241 teachers, the vast majority of whom received poor evaluations, and put 737 additional school employees on notice.

=== Criticism ===
Rhee's style of reform created a great deal of controversy. One common criticism disputes her assertion that, while a teacher, she dramatically increased students' average scores from the 13th percentile to the 90th. It was a statement that could not be verified during her confirmation process for D.C. Schools Chancellor.

Rhee contended that under her chancellorship, student achievement in the D.C. Public Schools greatly improved. Since 2007, secondary schools have improved their standardized test pass rates by 14 percent in reading and 17 percent in math, while elementary school pass rates have improved 6 percent in reading and 15 percent in math. Systemwide high school graduation rates also improved by 3 percent, up to 72 percent in 2009. By 2010, D.C. Comprehensive Assessment System reading pass rates had increased by 14 percentage points, and math pass rates had increased by 17 percentage points. Enrollment decreased by 1 percent, a slower decline than prior years. Education historian Diane Ravitch questioned the legitimacy of Rhee's results, alleging that "cheating, teaching to bad tests, institutionalized fraud, dumbing down of tests, and a narrowed curriculum" were the true outcomes of Rhee's tenure in D.C. schools.

Some D.C. parents and community leaders complained that despite these improvements, the speed with which Rhee enacted her reforms left them without input on the changes. The District Council also criticized Rhee for being unresponsive to council members' requests for information about school operations. From 2008 to 2010, Rhee's approval ratings decreased from 59 percent to 43 percent. In 2010, 28 percent of African Americans supported Rhee, down from 50 percent in 2008. Yet even "as residents grow less supportive of Fenty's designated change agent for the schools," noted the Washington Post, "they still approve of some of the changes. The proportion of parents in the city who see violence or crime as a 'big problem' has declined from 78 to 65 percent.... The quality and availability of books and other instructional materials is viewed as less of a major problem by all parents, dropping from 67 percent to 48 percent." Also, the Post indicated that "Rhee's efforts to raise the quality of teaching through improved training, evaluation, and dismissals might be gaining traction as well."

Rhee fired several administrators and school principals, including Marta Guzman, the principal of the high-performing Oyster-Adams Bilingual School, which Rhee's own children attended. Some parents alleged that the firing process was neither transparent nor fair. According to The Washington Post, "the departure has stunned many Oyster–Adams parents who wondered why, in a city filled with underperforming public schools, Rhee would sack a principal who has presided for the past five years over one of its few success stories. The move also heightened ethnic and class tensions within the school's diverse community. Eduardo Barada, co-chairman of the Oyster–Adams Community Council, the school's PTA, said Guzman was toppled by a cadre of dissatisfied and largely affluent Anglo parents with the ear of a woman who was both a fellow parent and the chancellor." Rhee also fired a principal she had hired seven weeks before in Shepherd Elementary, another high-performing school in the upper Northwest neighborhood.

Rhee was criticized for closing several D.C. schools without holding public hearings, for not reporting complete budget figures at D.C. council hearings, for not involving parents to a sufficient degree, hiring former supporters to conduct an evaluation of her performance, and for spending considerable time before the national media (Time, PBS, lecture circuit) instead of visiting schools. When Rhee outlined a proposed new security plan in a talk at what was then Woodrow Wilson High School, many students protested and proposed an alternative plan, Rhee responded indicating that she found the student plan well thought out and that she would consider incorporating aspects into the final plan.

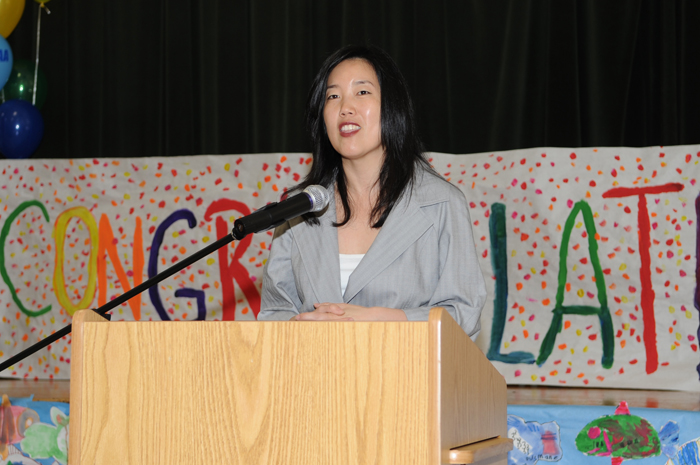
Rhee at a National Oceanic and Atmospheric Administration awards ceremony, June 2008

Referring to the 266 teachers she laid off, Rhee told a national business magazine: "I got rid of teachers who had hit children, who had had sex with children, who had missed 78 days of school. Why wouldn't we take those things into consideration?" George Parker, president of the teachers union, called Rhee's statements "reckless," said they had no factual basis, and demanded that Rhee apologize to the 266 teachers for making these remarks. Rhee declined to apologize for her statement, claimed that one of the 266 dismissed employees had been accused of sexual misconduct, six had been suspended for using corporal punishment, and two had been absent without leave, while many others also had egregious time and attendance records.

=== 2010 election and resignation ===
The 2010 mayoral election in Washington, D.C., was interpreted by some political observers as, in part, a referendum on Rhee's tenure as school chancellor. Following the defeat of incumbent mayor Adrian Fenty in the 2010 Democratic primary election, Fenty announced on October 13, 2010, that Rhee had resigned. Rhee launched a personal website, a Twitter account, and a Facebook page soon thereafter.

=== Cleared of alleged test erasures ===
Critics of Rhee, arguing that she had not genuinely improved education in D.C. schools, maintained that improvement in test scores must have been due to cheating, and attempted to show that changes made on some students’ tests, in which wrong answers were erased and correct answers substituted, indicated a systematic pattern of answer-changing, presumably at Rhee's direction. These complaints led to studies of the alleged erasures. In 2012, District of Columbia's inspector general conducted an investigation at Noyes Education Campus, and based on that investigation, it concluded "investigators found no evidence to corroborate these allegations", and that there was "no evidence of criminal activity or widespread cheating on the DC CAS exams".

In 2013 the U.S. Department of Education released the results of their investigation finding that there was no evidence of widespread cheating in the D.C. public schools. The investigation focused on a single school out of the dozens of schools where high rates of test erasures were reported. The investigation also excluded Rhee's first year. Only one incident of cheating that may have affected funding was found.

== School choice and school vouchers ==
Rhee was originally neutral on school vouchers, issuing a 2008 statement that she had not "taken a formal position on vouchers" and that she disagreed "with the notion that vouchers are the remedy for repairing the city’s school system." In an op-ed published in The Wall Street Journal on January 11, 2011, Rhee endorsed vouchers, saying that she supported "giving poor families access to publicly funded scholarships to attend private schools." She added that "All children deserve the chance to get a great education; no family should be forced to send kids to a school they know is failing." In a February 2011 speech before Georgia's legislature, she indicated she had supported the D.C. voucher program as a supplement to the charter school alternative. She said that if a parent did not win the lottery to get a child into a charter school, then "who am I to deny them a $7,500 voucher to send their child to a great Catholic school."

== After D.C. schools ==
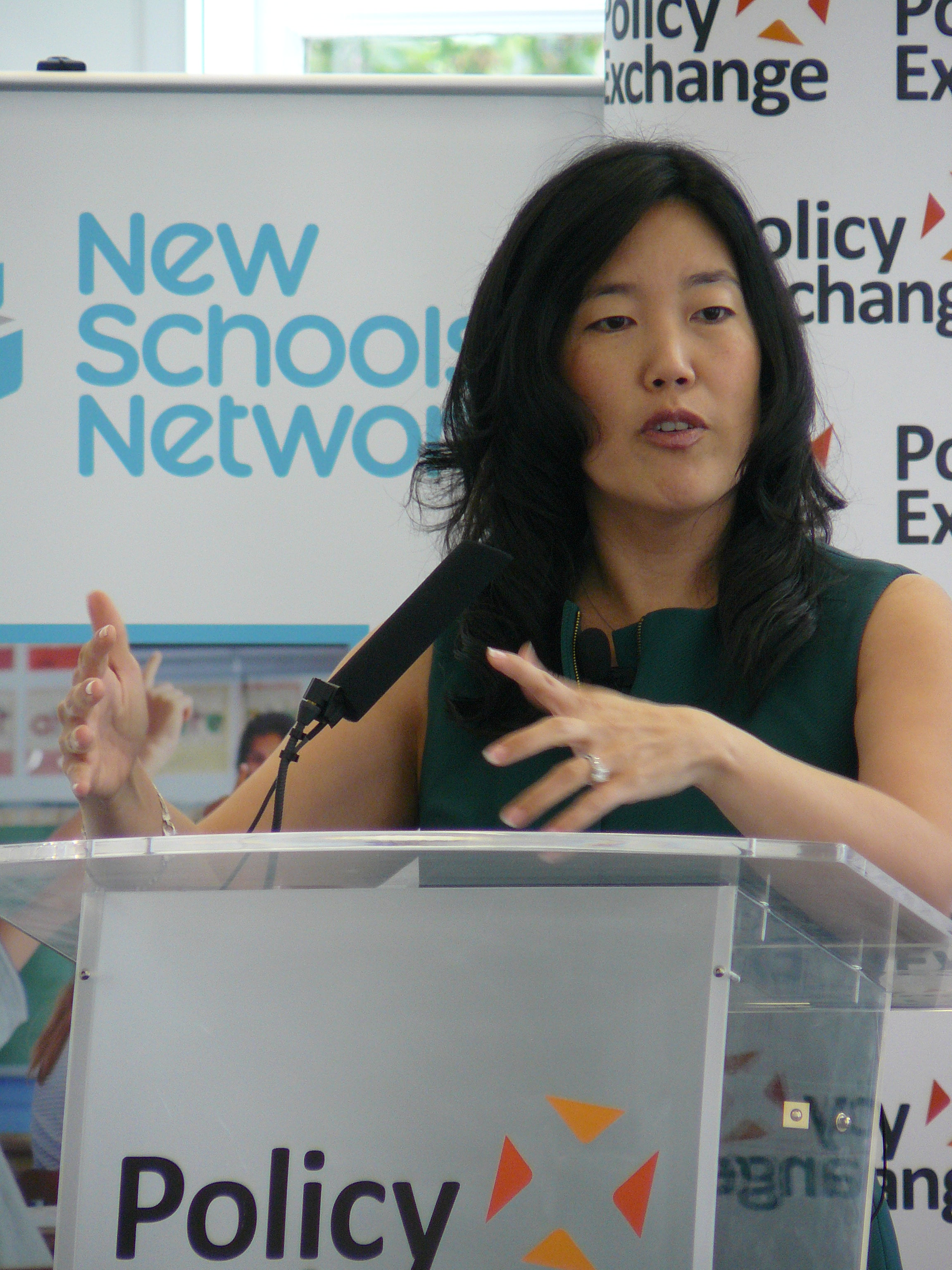
Rhee speaking to Policy Exchange in 2012

On December 6, 2010, Rhee went on The Oprah Winfrey Show to announce that she had declined all job offers resulting from her high-profile work as D.C. Chancellor and would be focusing on a new advocacy organization she had formed called StudentsFirst. She told Winfrey's audience she wanted to have one million members and raise $1 billion in order to catalyze education reform in the United States. According to The New York Times abolishing teacher tenure is a main objective of Rhee and the group. Within weeks of its founding, Rhee and StudentsFirst had advised the governors of Florida, Nevada and New Jersey on abolishing teacher tenure and other issues related to public education reform. In 2010–2011, Rhee served on the transition team of Florida Republican governor Rick Scott.

She has also been a visible figure in the national media, appearing on television shows, radio programs, and the documentary film Waiting for Superman. In May 2011, Rhee spoke in favor of school choice alongside the Wisconsin Republican governor, Scott Walker, at an event hosted by the American Federation for Children, a pro-school choice education organization founded and funded by Betsy DeVos.

In 2013, Rhee wrote Radical: Fighting to Put Students First.

In August 2014, Rhee became a board member of the Scotts Miracle-Gro Company. She also replaced Jim Scheible as chairman of St. Hope Public Schools, a charter school chain run by her husband, Sacramento mayor Kevin Johnson, and subsequently announced that she would be stepping down as CEO of StudentsFirst. On March 29, 2016, StudentsFirst announced some of its state chapters would merge with 50CAN, a nonprofit education advocacy group based in Washington, D.C.

On November 19, 2016, Rhee met with President-elect Donald Trump and Vice President–elect Mike Pence, sparking speculation that she was in consideration for Secretary of Education; Rhee later tweeted that she was not interested in pursuing the position.

Rhee has served on the advisory boards for the National Council on Teacher Quality, and the National Center for Alternative Certification. She was a special guest of First Lady Laura Bush at President George W. Bush's 2008 State of the Union address.

== Family and personal life ==
While Rhee was teaching, she met Kevin Huffman, who was also a member of Teach for America and later became head of public affairs of the organization. The couple married two years after meeting; while married they had two daughters. They divorced in 2007. Both daughters attended private schools, the Harpeth Hall School in Nashville, Tennessee, and the Chattanooga Christian School in Chattanooga, Tennessee. In March 2010, Rhee became engaged to Kevin Johnson, 55th mayor of Sacramento, California, and former NBA player. The two married in September 2011 in a small ceremony at Blackberry Farm near Knoxville, Tennessee.

== See also ==
- Lobbying in the United States
- No Child Left Behind Act
- Privatization
- Teaching to the test

Non-profit organization positions
New office	Chief Executive Officer of The New Teacher Project; 1997–2007	Succeeded by Arlela Rozman
New office	Chief Executive Officer of StudentsFirst; 2010–present	Incumbent
Political offices
Preceded by Clifford Janey	Chancellor of District of Columbia Public Schools; 2007–2010	Succeeded by Kaya Henderson
