= The New Teacher Project =

Teacher training program

TNTP
- Founded: 1997
- Founder: Michelle Rhee
- Type: Public charity
- Location: New York City, New York
- Employees: 300+
- Website: tntp.org

TNTP, formerly known as The New Teacher Project, is an American nonprofit organization that funds lobbying and educational research, in addition to doing paid consulting work in public school districts around the United States. Its stated goal is to work with governments, school districts and nonprofit organizations on policies and practices related to teacher preparation, evaluation and educational equity. TNTP was founded in 1997 by Michelle Rhee.

== Overview ==
TNTP has released a series of studies of the policies and practices related to public education and the quality of the nation's teacher workforce, including The Widget Effect (2009), Teacher Evaluation 2.0 (2010), The Irreplaceables (2012), and Unlocking Algebra: What the Data Tells Us About Helping Students Catch Up (2025).

== History ==
TNTP was founded in 1997 by Michelle Rhee. According to TNTP, its initial mission was to increase the supply of newly certified teachers in schools it identified as high‑need. During its first decade, the organization focused on recruitment, training, and hiring of new teachers in urban school systems. In 2000, TNTP launched the Teaching Fellows and Academy programs, which served as alternate routes to teacher certification for schools it described as high-need. As of 2026, TNTP has also worked with state and district public school systems on systems for evaluating and managing teacher performance.

TNTP began helping districts identify and address additional challenges, including hiring teachers earlier, staffing challenged schools, and providing teacher certification training. It also began identifying policies counterproductive to overcoming these challenges and publishing reports to offer solutions and encourage reform.

== Organization ==
TNTP is a revenue-generating nonprofit. The majority of its revenue comes from contracts with districts and states to supply its services. Additional funding for new program development and research is provided by donors such as the Bill & Melinda Gates Foundation. Wendy Kopp remained as president of the board of TNTP until 2000, according to TNTP's 990 form.

== Reports ==
=== The Widget Effect (2009) ===
In 2009, TNTP published The Widget Effect: Our National Failure to Acknowledge and Act Upon Teacher Effectiveness. The report, which surveyed over 15,000 teachers and 1,300 principals in 12 school districts, concluded that the U.S. public education system treats teachers as "interchangeable parts", rather than individual professionals. American Federation of Teachers (AFT) President Randi Weingarten provided a public statement of support for the report, saying it "points the way to a credible, fair, accurate and effective teacher evaluation system that would improve teaching and learning." The National Education Policy Center (NEPC) review of The Widget Effect concluded that the report "generally points policy in the right direction" while cautioning that "the recommendations rest on appeals to common sense rather than on actual empirical evidence", advising policymakers only implement them with "deliberate caution."

=== Teacher Evaluation 2.0 (2010) ===
The National Education Policy Center was critical of TNTP's report Teacher Evaluation 2.0, which, it said, contained "recommendations for teacher evaluation [that] boil down, for the most part, to truisms and conventional wisdom, lacking a supporting presentation of scholarly evidence." The review also claimed that "many of the ideas and recommendations are neither new nor innovative."

=== The Irreplaceables (2012) ===
In 2012, TNTP published The Irreplaceables: Understanding the Real Retention Crisis in America's Urban Schools. The study identified the failure of public schools to keep more of their strongest teachers (or "irreplaceables") in the classroom than their weakest as the fundamental problem with teacher retention in urban school districts. The report, which focused on four large urban school districts, also offered suggestions for how districts and schools can help keep more of their best teachers.

Upon The Irreplaceables' release, U.S. Secretary of Education Arne Duncan publicly supported TNTP's findings. The National Education Association (NEA) also praised the report, noting that TNTP had "helped focus attention on one of our nation's most valuable assets: the dedicated professionals who educate our children."

=== Unlocking Algebra (2025) ===
In 2025, TNTP published Unlocking Algebra: What the Data Tells us About Helping Students Catch Up. The report examined the relationship between earlier mathematics skills and student success in Algebra 1. The report analyzed math performance data from approximately 2,000 students who used an online learning platform between 2021 and 2024 and identified a set of specific "predecessor skills" from earlier grades that were strongly associated with mastery of Algebra 1 content.

== Teacher Preparation Programs ==
2008 data from Louisiana said, "that TNTP teachers outperform beginning and experienced teachers in math, reading, and language arts." In 2010, a state-sponsored study assessed the effectiveness of newly certified teachers in Louisiana. Out of 17 teacher preparation providers, TNTP was the only provider rated at the highest performance level in 4 out of 5 subject areas. A 2010 study out of Louisiana State University indicated the TNTP Practitioner Program is one of a group of programs in that state "producing teachers who in aggregate appear to be making a positive contribution to student achievement from the time they complete their training program and begin teaching" insofar as they are programs "whose results were generally consistent with the student achievement results of experienced certified teachers" (the other programs were the Louisiana State University Shreveport NM/CO program and Southeastern Louisiana University's Master's Alternate Certification program). In 2009, a report by the Center for American Progress, U.S. Chamber of Commerce, and the American Enterprise Institute included TNTP along with certain public school districts, charter school entrepreneurs, and other independent organizations as "addressing stubborn challenges by pursuing familiar notions of good teaching and effective schooling in impressively coherent, disciplined, and strategic ways." The report stated that "TNTP had recruited nontraditional applicants into teaching positions and cited external research in support of that claim."

== Controversy ==
In June 2009, TNTP released a report called The Widget Effect. The report looked at teacher evaluation, based on collaboration with over 50 district and state officials and 25 teachers' union representatives.

The American Federation of Teachers said the general conclusion of the report was sound, but stated they had "concerns about the report's data" due to a mismatch with Toledo, Ohio's own teacher evaluation system. TNTP corrected the data about teacher dismissals in Toledo Public Schools after receiving additional information. A later article characterized some of the key data in the original report as having been off by 200–530%.

== See also ==
- Alternative teaching certification
- Education in the United States
- StudentsFirst
