= 50CAN =

50CAN: The 50-State Campaign for Achievement Now
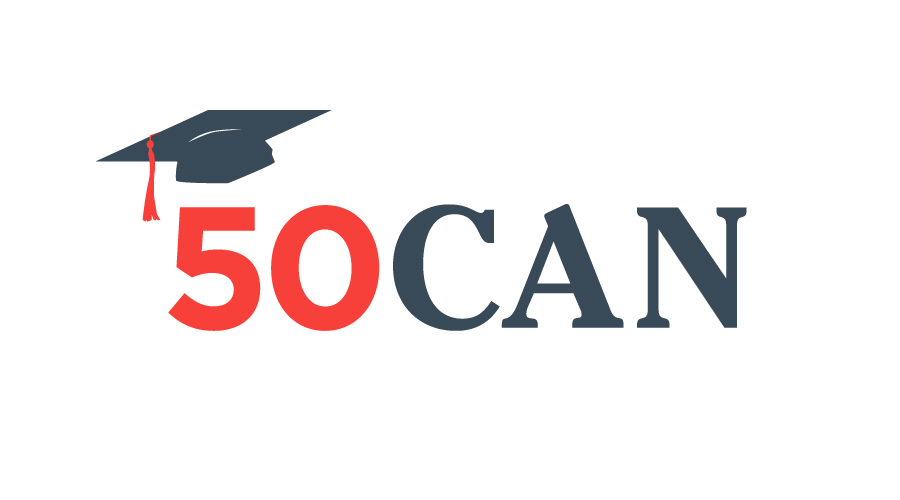
- Founded: July 9, 2010; 16 years ago
- Founder: Marc Porter Magee
- Type: 501(c)(3)
- Tax ID no.: 27-3069592
- Legal status: Nonprofit organization
- Purpose: Education advocacy
- Location(s): 1380 Monroe Street NW, #413, Washington, D.C. 20010; U.S.
- Board Chair: Michael Phillips
- Chief Executive Officer: Marc Porter Magee
- President: Derrell Bradford
- Subsidiaries: 50CAN Action Fund _{(501(c)(4))}
- Revenue: $80.6 million (2023)
- Expenses: $74.2 million (2023)
- Website: www.50can.org

50CAN (The 50-State Campaign for Achievement Now) is a nonprofit education advocacy group founded in January 2011 and headquartered in Washington, D.C. According to its website, 50CAN's mission is to advocate for a high-quality education for all kids, regardless of their address. The organization aims to find, connect and support local leaders in states across the country to help them improve educational policies in their communities.

== History ==
50CAN grew out of ConnCAN (founded in 2005) and was incubated inside the Connecticut nonprofit in 2010 before being formally spun off as an independent organization in 2011. Marc Porter Magee left his role as ConnCAN chief operating officer to establish 50CAN. He become 50CAN's first president, later becoming the organization's chief executive officer. 50CAN employs 34 people, and it runs education campaigns in nine states.

== Affiliate offices ==
50CAN currently operates policy campaigns in nine states. In 2016, it announced it would grow to additional states by merging with StudentsFirst, and that former StudentsFirst chapters would retain their branding within their states.
