= A Chance to Make History =

- Author: Wendy Kopp
- Language: English
- Subject: Education
- Genre: Nonfiction
- Published: 2011 (PublicAffairs)
- Publication place: United States

A Chance to Make History: What Works and What Doesn't in Providing an Excellent Education for All is a book by Wendy Kopp, CEO and founder of Teach For America. It was published by PublicAffairs in January 2011.

In A Chance to Make History, Kopp draws on examples of effective teachers, schools, and districts to demonstrate what she believes is needed to provide all children with a "transformational" education.

A Chance to Make History is the second book by Wendy Kopp. Her first book, One Day, All Children, was published in 2003 by PublicAffairs.

== Background ==
Kopp is the chair of the board and founder of Teach For America, the national teaching corps. Kopp came up with the idea for the organization in her 1989 undergraduate research thesis at Princeton University. She is also the CEO and co-founder of Teach For All, a global network of independent nonprofit organizations that apply the same model as Teach For America in other countries.

== Recognition ==
A Chance to Make History was named a Washington Post bestselling book in April 2011.
