= Teach For Armenia =

Educational non-profit organization

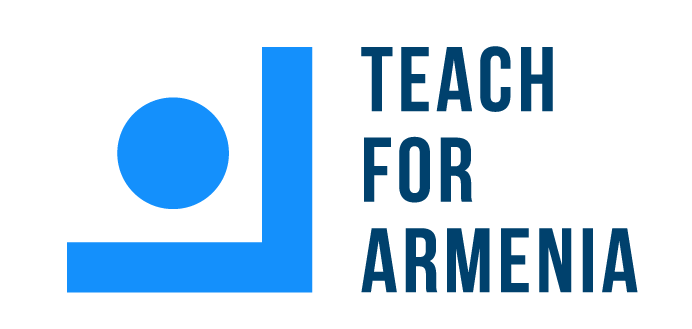
- Founded: 2013
- Founder: Larisa Hovannisian
- Type: Nonprofit organization
- Purpose: Eliminate Educational Inequity
- Location: Yerevan, Armenia
- Website: teachforarmenia.org

Teach For Armenia (Armenian: «Դասավանդի՛ր, Հայաստան» կրթական հիմնադրամ) is a non-profit organization, which aims to expand educational opportunities for all children in Armenia, regardless of their socio-economic circumstances, by recruiting, training, and supporting high-achieving graduates and professionals to teach for a minimum of two years in the most underserved schools across Armenia.

== Background ==
Teach For Armenia was founded in 2013 by Larisa Hovannisian after her two-year teaching experience in an elementary and middle school in Glendale, Arizona through the Teach For America program. Together with its supporters, Teach For Armenia's founding team embarked on an ambitious mission to transform the country's public education system so that educational excellence and opportunity would reach every child, even the most marginalized.

== Activities ==
=== Theory of Problem and Theory of Change ===
Today in Armenia, approximately 25% of students from socioeconomically disadvantaged communities do not enroll in high school. The country's students have consistently ranked behind their peers in neighboring countries and below international averages in math and science, and these figures decline further with each passing year. Children in the communities Teach For Armenia serves, lack access to the high-quality teaching and educational opportunities that are readily available to their wealthier peers; and an estimated 35% of schools in these communities face teacher shortages. As a result, tens of thousands of Armenian children are being left without the skills they need to pursue higher education and attain financial security. This educational inequity fuels Armenia's most urgent societal problems and entrenches cycles of poverty in a country where about 30% of the population is impoverished. To address this crucial issue of educational inequity, Teach For Armenia harnesses the energy, enthusiasm, and drive of exceptional university graduates to infuse great teachers into Armenia's most disadvantaged schools and to cultivate lifelong champions for educational excellence.

== Geographical reach ==
Currently, Teach For Armenia operates in five regions of Armenia: Gegharkunik, Lori, Armavir, Tavush, and Aragatsotn.

== Partnership with Teach For All ==
In 2015, Teach For Armenia officially became the 36th partner of Teach For All, a global network of 58 and counting independent, locally led, and locally operated partner organizations with a shared mission to expand educational opportunity within their own countries by leveraging their country's best talent.

== Recruitment and Application Acceptance Rate ==
Teach For Armenia recruits highly-achieving university graduates from Armenia and the Armenian diaspora through a uniquely designed admissions process that consists of five-stages: online application, phone interview, subject knowledge test, and assessment center. According to recent statistics, participant acceptance rate is 7.5%.

== Leadership Development Program ==
Once selected, Fellows participate in a rigorous two-year, context-specific training and leadership development program that prepares them as educators and future leaders of education in Armenia. Prior to the two-year training, Fellows go through Summer Institute, an intensive 6-week, mandatory training program. The objective of the institute is twofold: first and foremost, it is designed to effectively train future Fellows for their two-year teaching commitment, while helping students from rural communities overcome knowledge gaps through free of charge summer school. During the Fellowship, Fellows receive constant leadership development and classroom management support by the Teach For Armenia training team. Furthermore, Fellows have an opportunity to pursue a free-of-charge master's degree in pedagogy from an Armenian state university. Following completion of the two-year Fellowship, Fellows join the Teach For Armenia ambassador network, a community of passionate and committed leaders who continue to address the issues of educational disadvantage and inequity in Armenia.

== Teach For Armenia’s Impact to Date ==
Following its first two years of placements, early data indicates that Teach For Armenia is already making a change. According to recent survey results, student engagement levels in Teach For Armenia classrooms are above average within the Teach For All network, with Fellows establishing rigorous and interactive environments and setting students on an expanded path towards educational opportunity. Furthermore, student assessments show a dramatic boost in student growth both in academics and personal leadership development; after just a year with Teach For Armenia Fellows, students demonstrate double average growth in academic content mastery. Beyond the school curriculum, through extracurricular activities and community projects, Teach For Armenia Fellows are helping students to develop lifelong non-academic skills and mindsets.

== Supporters ==
Due to Teach For Armenia's early impact and reputation, the organization was able to establish partnerships with important stakeholders in Armenian education, including the national Ministry of Education and regional educational authorities. Beyond this, Teach For Armenia is also partnered with other education-focused, highly reputable foundations, such as the AGBU, Scholae Mundi Armenia Foundation, the Simonian Educational Foundation, etc.

== Board of directors ==
The members of the Board of Directors of the Teach For Armenia Educational Foundation are:

- Veronika Zonabend, chair of the Board (chair of the Board of Governors UWC Dilijan College, co-founder of IDeA (Initiatives for Development of Armenia) Foundation, Founder of RVVZ and Scholae Mundi Armenia Foundations);
- Sam Simonian (Founder of Tumo Center for Creative Technologies and Simonian Educational Foundation);
- Sylva Simonian (co-founder of Tumo Centre for Creative Technologies and Simonian Educational Foundation);
- Alice Petrossian (Member at Armenian Educational Foundation);
- Carol Aslanian (Member of AGBU Central Board of Directors, President and Founder of Aslanian Market Research and Senior Vice President at Education Dynamics);
- Pierre Gurdjian (President of Board of Directors at Université Libre de Bruxelles);
- Yamit Taragan (Senior Director of Growth Strategy & Development in Europe at Teach For All);
- Armine Hovannisian (the Founder and Chairperson of Orran NGO and Founder of Junior Achievement of Armenia);
- Sonya Hovsepyan (Chief Project Expert at the National Center for Legislative Regulations, Government of the RA);
- Serob Khachatryan (Lecturer at Chair of History of Philosophy of Yerevan State University).

== See also ==
- Peace Corps
- Teach For All
- Teach First
- Teach For America
- Teach First Deutschland
- Tumo Center for Creative Technologies
- UWC Dilijan College
