= Teach for China =

Non-profit educational programme

Teach For China (Chinese: 美丽中国支教项目) is a non-profit educational programme established in 2008 under the Beijing Liede Future Scholarship Foundation, with the aim of 'giving all Chinese children, regardless of their origins, access to the same level of quality education' (Chinese: 让所有中国孩子，无论出身，都能获得同等的优质教育). It is an affiliate of the Teach For All network, which promotes the Teach For America model. Started by Andrea Pasinetti, an American living in China, the program originally began thanks to a grant from the Ford Foundation and facilitated exchange teaching by American volunteers (though U.S. volunteer participation ended in 2015 due to increased scrutiny and restrictions from the Chinese government).

As an educational non-profit programme, Teach For China's positive actions have brought more than 2,700 teachers to China's rural areas, effectively narrowing and bridging the long-standing inequalities in the distribution of educational resources in the China between the urban and rural areas, and between the developed and underdeveloped regions and promoted the balanced development of education in China.

By the end of 2021, the project had dispatched more than 3,100 project teachers to more than 440 primary and secondary schools in education resource-poor areas, impacting more than 890,000 rural students. In 2022, under the guidance of the Youth Volunteer Action Guidance Centre of the Central Committee of the Communist Youth League of China, the Teach For China Project launched the 'College Students' Volunteer Service in the West Programme Teach For China Teaching Special Project' (Chinese: 大学生志愿服务西部计划美丽中国支教专项), a sub-project of the Western Plan.
