= Larisa Hovannisian =

Armenian-American entrepreneur and activist

Larisa V Hovannisian
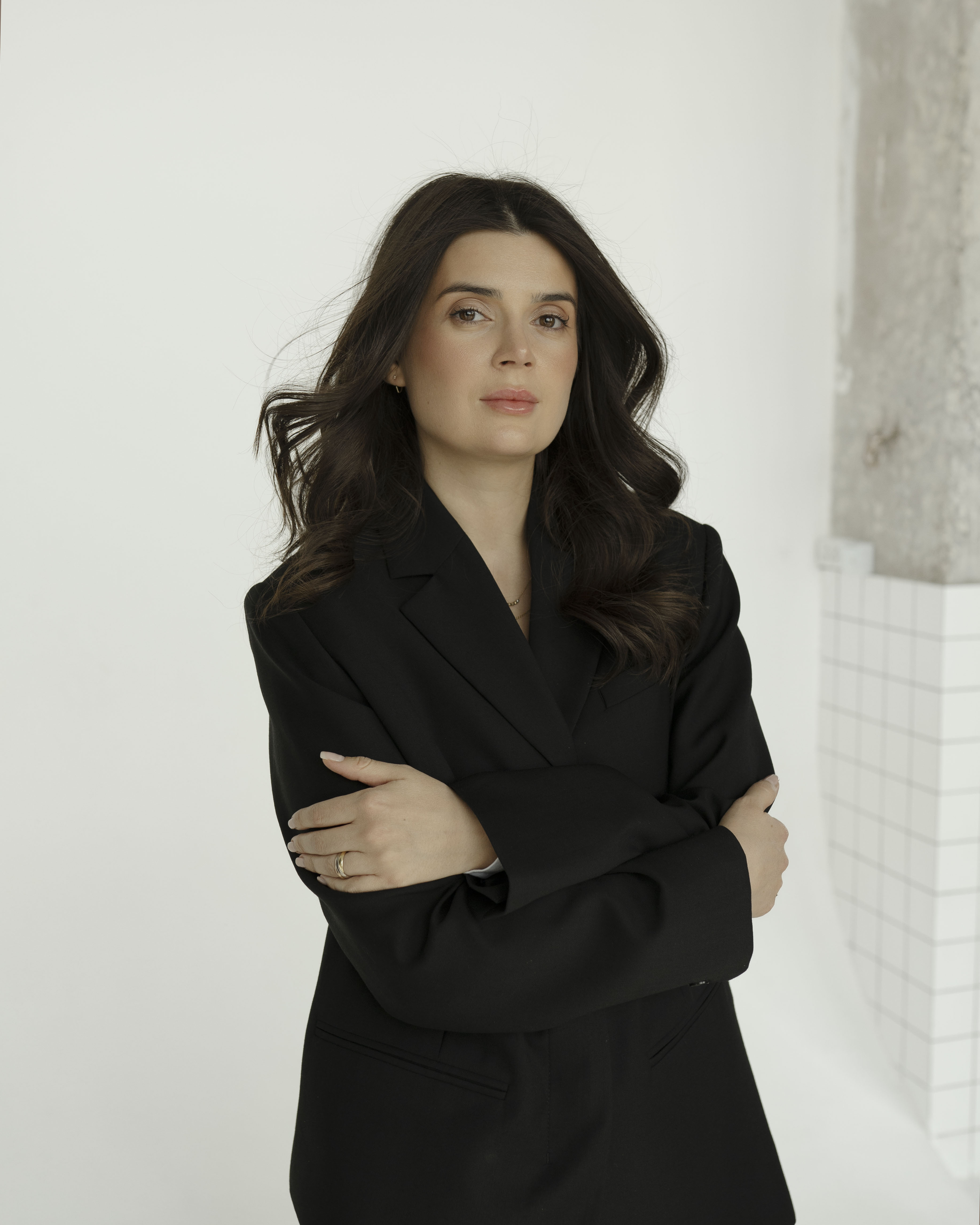
- Hovannisian in Ambassador Induction Ceremony 2017
- Born: Larisa Virginia Ryan; 21 October 1988 (age 37); Yerevan, Armenian SSR, Soviet Union
- Citizenship: Armenia, USA
- Education: St. Norbert College, Arizona State University's Mary Lou Fulton Teachers College
- Occupations: CEO and Founder, Teach For Armenia
- Spouse: Garin K Hovannisian (m. 2016)
- Children: Leo Hovannisian

Larisa Virginia Hovannisian (née Ryan; Armenian: Լարիսա Վիրջինիա Հովհաննիսյան; born 21 October 1988) is an Armenian-American social entrepreneur. She founded Teach For Armenia, a non-profit organization dedicated to addressing educational inequity in Armenia and Artsakh.

Hovannisian was born in Yerevan, Soviet Armenia (now Armenia) and raised in an Armenian-American family. She spent her formative years between Moscow and Yerevan.

== Education ==
Hovannisian is a graduate of St. Norbert College, a liberal arts college in De Pere, Wisconsin and Arizona State University's Mary Lou Fulton Teachers College.

== Career ==
In 2013, Hovannisian founded Teach For Armenia, a social impact organization with a mission to catalyze a movement of impact-driven leaders expanding educational opportunities to all children in Armenia. Teach For Armenia is the 36th partner of Teach For All, a global education network dedicated to expanding educational opportunities in countries around the world. Hovannisian serves on the Board of Kizazi, a nonprofit organization empowering young leaders in Africa and Central and Southern Asia.

== Teach For Armenia ==
Founded in 2013, Teach For Armenia is a nonprofit organization catalyzing a nationwide movement of impact-driven leaders expanding educational opportunities to all children in Armenia and Artsakh.The organization recruits and trains university graduates and professionals, known as "Teacher-Leaders," to commit to teaching in underserved schools for two years across Armenia and Artsakh. Together with their alumni community of teachers and students, the organization is fueling a movement to end educational inequity in the country.

To this date, Teach For Armenia is one of the largest nonprofits in Armenia and the region, impacting over 30,000 students from across the nation.

== Awards ==
For her contribution to the advancement of Armenia through her work with Teach For Armenia, Larisa was nationally recognized by the Armenian Government in September 2016.

== Music ==
In 2015 Hovannisian recorded an Armenian lullaby, "Ari Im Sokhag", with Serj Tankian, the lead vocalist of Grammy Award winning rock band System of a Down. The song became the soundtrack of the film 1915, a psychological thriller about the Armenian genocide.
