= Brett Wigdortz =

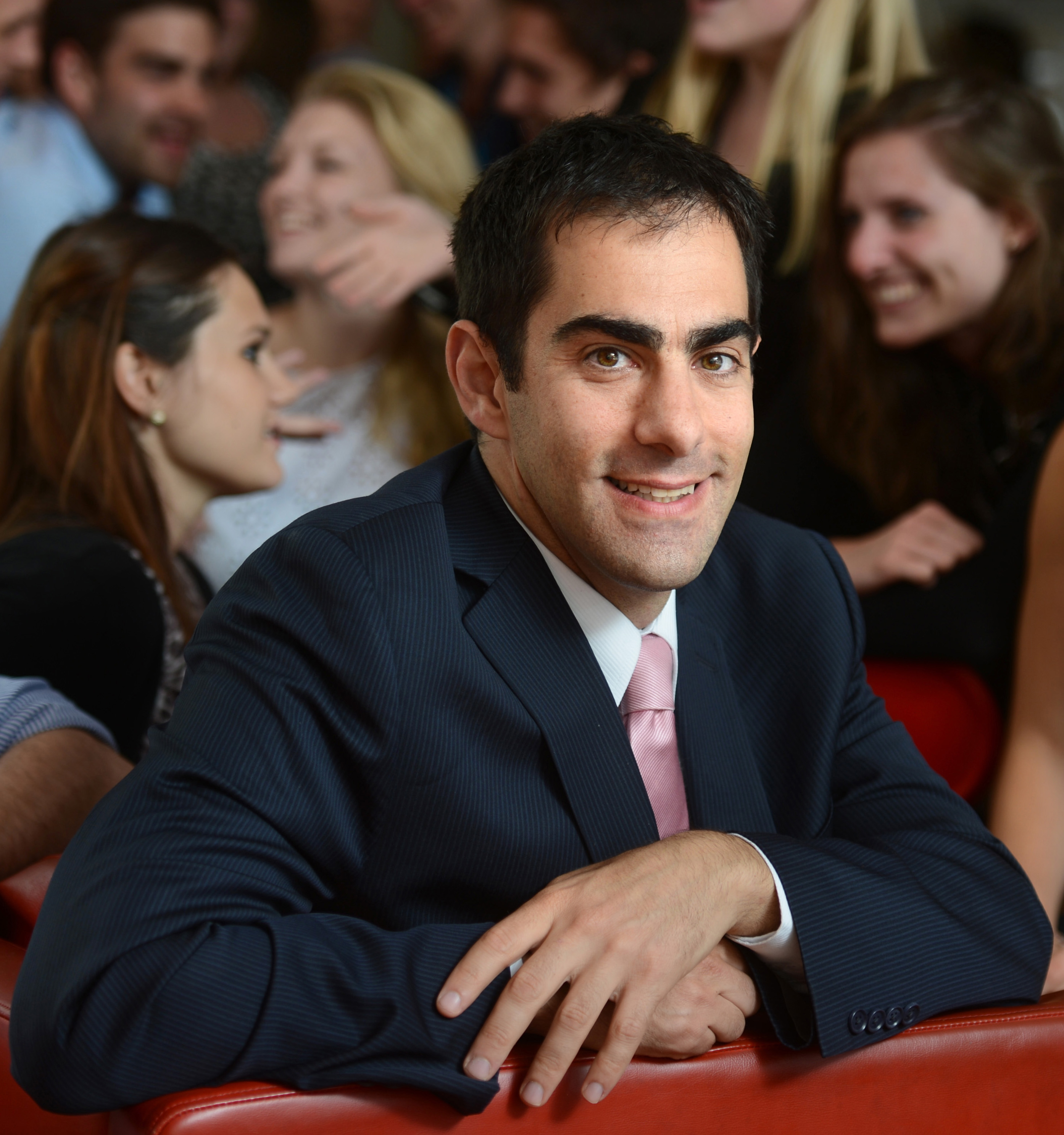

Personal details
- Born: Ocean Township, New Jersey, United States
- Occupation: Founder of Teach First; Social entrepreneur

Brett Harris Wigdortz OBE (born in 1973) is the Founder and Honorary President of Teach First, an educational charity working to break the link between low family income and poor educational attainment in England and Wales. He founded Teach First and was its CEO from its launch in 2002 until October 2017. He is originally from Ocean Township, New Jersey, United States and is a dual US/UK citizen.

He is co-founder and was Deputy CEO and for 12 years a trustee of Teach For All, a global charity created with Wendy Kopp (who also founded Teach For America in 1989) to help social entrepreneurs in other countries start similar programs and create a global network of social enterprises dedicated to addressing educational disadvantage.

Wigdortz was a founding trustee of Ada, the National College for Digital Skills. In 2012, he founded and continues to serve on the board of the Fair Education Alliance, which was incubated in Teach First until spinning out in 2019. In 2018, he worked with Jamie Oliver to found and is currently on the board of Bite Back 2030, a movement of young people who are campaigning for a healthier generation.

== Education and career ==
Wigdortz grew up in Ocean Township, Monmouth County, New Jersey. he graduated with an Honours bachelor's degree in Economics and International Studies: Politics and Diplomacy from the University of Richmond in Richmond, Virginia in 1995, and a master's degree in Economics from the University of Hawaiʻi and a Masters Certificate in Asian Studies from the East–West Center in 1997.

While studying at the University of Hawaiʻi, he worked as a researcher at the East-West Centre in Honolulu, focusing on energy and economic development issues in Southeast Asia and Pacific Islands. He co-authored a paper on future Asian energy flows ("China and Central Asia's Volatile Mix: Energy, Trade, and Ethnic Relations") and consulted for the State of Hawaii.

During 1998, he worked as a journalist in Indonesia and Hong Kong, covering the Asian economic crisis and political changes in Indonesia. In 1999, he went on to develop South East Asia policy and business programmes at the Asia Society in New York City. In 2000, Wigdortz joined McKinsey & Company as a consultant in Indonesia, Singapore, and the Philippines, focusing on retail banking, organisational effectiveness, and Asian microfinance.

In August 2001, Wigdortz transferred to McKinsey's London office and was placed on a pro bono study for business organisations London First and Business in the Community to look at how their business members could help improve results in London schools. It was during this project that he wrote the original business plan for Teach First and then took what was originally planned as a six-month leave of absence in February 2002 to develop and build support for the idea.

== Founding Teach First ==
In July 2002, Teach First officially launched in Canary Wharf, with a team of 11 employees and with Stephen O'Brien CBE and George Iacobescu CBE as co-chairs of the Board of Trustees. After the launch, Wigdortz continued to lead the organisation as CEO.

In 2007, Wigdortz was named the UK Ernst & Young Social Entrepreneur of the Year and the 2011 CASE (Council for the Advancement and Support of Education) European Leadership Award for his entrepreneurial success and outstanding efforts in promoting and supporting education. Wigdortz was also awarded "Charity Principal of the Year" at the Charity Times Awards 2012. He was particularly recognised by the judges "for his vision, tenacity and commitment to social change." The Evening Standard named him one of the 1,000 most influential Londoners. He was appointed an OBE (Officer in the Order of the British Empire) for services to education in the 2013 New Year's Honours list. In 2015, Wigdortz was named one of the "Debrett's 500" most influential people in the UK. In 2016, he received an Honorary Doctorate of Laws from the University of Warwick, from Birmingham City University in 2017 and the Open University in 2019.

In 2013–2023, Teach First was one of the largest graduate recruiter in the UK, with over 1,400 new participants a year.

== National Citizen Service Trust ==
In July 2018 Wigdortz was appointed as the chairman of the board of the National Citizen Service (NCS) Trust, the public body responsible for the management of the UK government's National Citizen Service programme, following its reconstitution as a Royal Charter Body.

In July 2021, Wigdortz was re-appointed for another 2 year term.

In 2022, NCS grew to over 100,000 participants, carrying out a significant organisational restructure that ensured it was set up to deliver a new strategy.

Wigdortz completed his second term on 11 July 2023 and was succeeded by Harris Bokhari OBE.

== Personal life ==
Wigdortz is married and lives in North London with his three children. He has travelled to over 70 countries in the past 18 years. He has also written a book, about the first decade of Teach First as a guide to other entrepreneurs, entitled Success Against the Odds – Five lessons in how to achieve the impossible; the story of Teach First. It was named WHSmith's Business Book of the Month in September 2012.
