= Teach For Us =

- Founded: 2006
- Founder: Adam Geller
- Type: Public charity
- Purpose: Educate the public and support the teachers who work to close the achievement gap
- Method: Operate a blog network for Teach For America teachers to share their experiences
- Website: teachforus.org

Teach For Us is an American non-profit organization that works to educate the public about the challenges faced by recent college graduates and professionals who agree to teach for two years in low-income communities throughout the United States as part of the Teach For America program.

== History ==
The organization was founded by Adam Geller, who himself was a Teach For America teacher starting in 2006 after he developed the idea for a blog community when he could not find an appropriate place to create a blog to update family and friends about his experiences. Since starting in 2006, Teach For Us has grown to host more than 1200 blogs written by Teach For America teachers, also called corps members. Teach For America started publicly recognizing Teach For Us as an independent source of information about the program starting in 2008 and acknowledges the site from its homepage and several sub-pages.

Teach For Us was originally launched under the name TeachFor.Us, but in April 2010, Teach For Us filed with the Missouri Secretary of State and incorporated under the current name as a nonprofit corporation in the state of Missouri. Teach For Us is a recognized 501(c)3 charity by the IRS.

== Media coverage ==
Teach For Us has been featured in media across the United States and is the subject of educational research set to be published Fall 2010 by a Georgia State University doctoral candidate.

- In January 2007, the Los Angeles Times covered the Teach For Us blog In the Lou in its School Me! blog, which covered a range of local and national education issues.
- The education periodical Instructor named Teach For Us as "Best blog from the trenches" on its list of Top 20 Teacher Blogs
- Rasmussen College named the Teach For Us network to its list of "Top 50 Blogs for Teachers."
- Author Joanne Jacobs, who wrote Our School, links to content on Teach For Us in her blog focusing on current education issues.
- Popular New York City education blog Gotham Schools covered Teach For Us in 2008 and links to bloggers periodically in its regular coverage.
- A Teach For Us blogger was invited to speak at an Education Sector policy panel exploring the link between teacher evaluation and professional development.

== Audience ==
Teach For Us does not post firm numbers of visitors, though they report significant year-over-year growth in visitors. Based on this information, it's estimated that monthly visitors top 42,000.

Audience analysis from Quantcast reveals Teach For Us reaches a balanced male/female audience that is overwhelmingly US-based with good distribution across ages and ethnicities. Teach For Us has above average market penetration in the 18-34 and 35-49 age brackets. The site also shows above-average exposure to African American internet users and has a high index of college and graduate-level-educated visitors.

== Software platform ==
When Teach For Us launched in 2006, social media was in its infancy. Facebook was still limited to a select set of college campuses, and Twitter was not yet a household term. As such, there were only two experimental offshoots of the popular blogging platform WordPress that could support a network of blogs. Teach For Us partnered with ibiblio and deployed on Lyceum.

Lyceum stopped development when WordPress MU started to merge with the official WordPress source code in version 3.0. As such, Teach For Us made the decision to transition to WordPress 3.0 in 2010 in order to meet the technical needs of running a network of blogs while allowing users a more familiar experience found with WordPress.

== See also ==
- Teach For America, the program that Teaches For Us is a part of.
