= Matthew Hood =

Principal of Oak National Academy

Matthew Hood OBE (born December 1985) is co-founder Oak National Academy, the national online classroom and teacher resource hub created during the COVID-19 pandemic. He was appointed OBE (Officer of the Most Excellent Order of the British Empire) in 2020 for services to education.

== Personal life ==
Born in the Lancashire seaside town of Morecambe and brought up between there and Blackpool as part of a "big, complicated, non-nuclear family". He was the youngest of five children. Despite describing his childhood as 'great', his family were not well off and he spent a "decent chunk" of his early childhood and late teens living in a caravan.

He attended Great Wood Primary School in Morecambe, St. Wilfrid's CofE Primary School in Halton and Lancaster Royal Grammar School. He went on to study Politics, Philosophy and Economics at the University of York.

In June 2019, he married Josh MacAlister, founder of Frontline, who has since become Member of Parliament for Whitehaven and Workington. They live in Penrith, Cumbria.

== Career ==
Hood trained to be an economics teacher through Teach First in 2007, teaching in Edmonton, Tottenham. He went on to become a policy adviser at the Department for Education, then North East Regional Director at Teach First, before becoming assistant head at Morecambe's Heysham High School (now Bay Leadership Academy).

In 2015 he founded the Institute for Teaching, a charity focused on developing and improving teachers' expertise. In March 2018 the Institute for Teaching merged with Ambition School Leadership to become Ambition Institute, an education charity tackling educational disadvantage through evidence-based professional development for teachers and school leaders.

Hood is also Chair at Bay Leadership Academy in Morecambe, Governor at Lancaster and Morecambe College and an independent adviser to the Department for Education.

Hood is a founding trustee at The Brilliant Club, a post he stepped down from in 2021. In 2015 he was awarded a Churchill Fellowship.

Hood co-founded Oak National Academy alongside David Thomas in 2020, initially its Principal and later CEO stepping down in 2025.
