= Josh MacAlister =

British politician

Josh MacAlister OBE MP
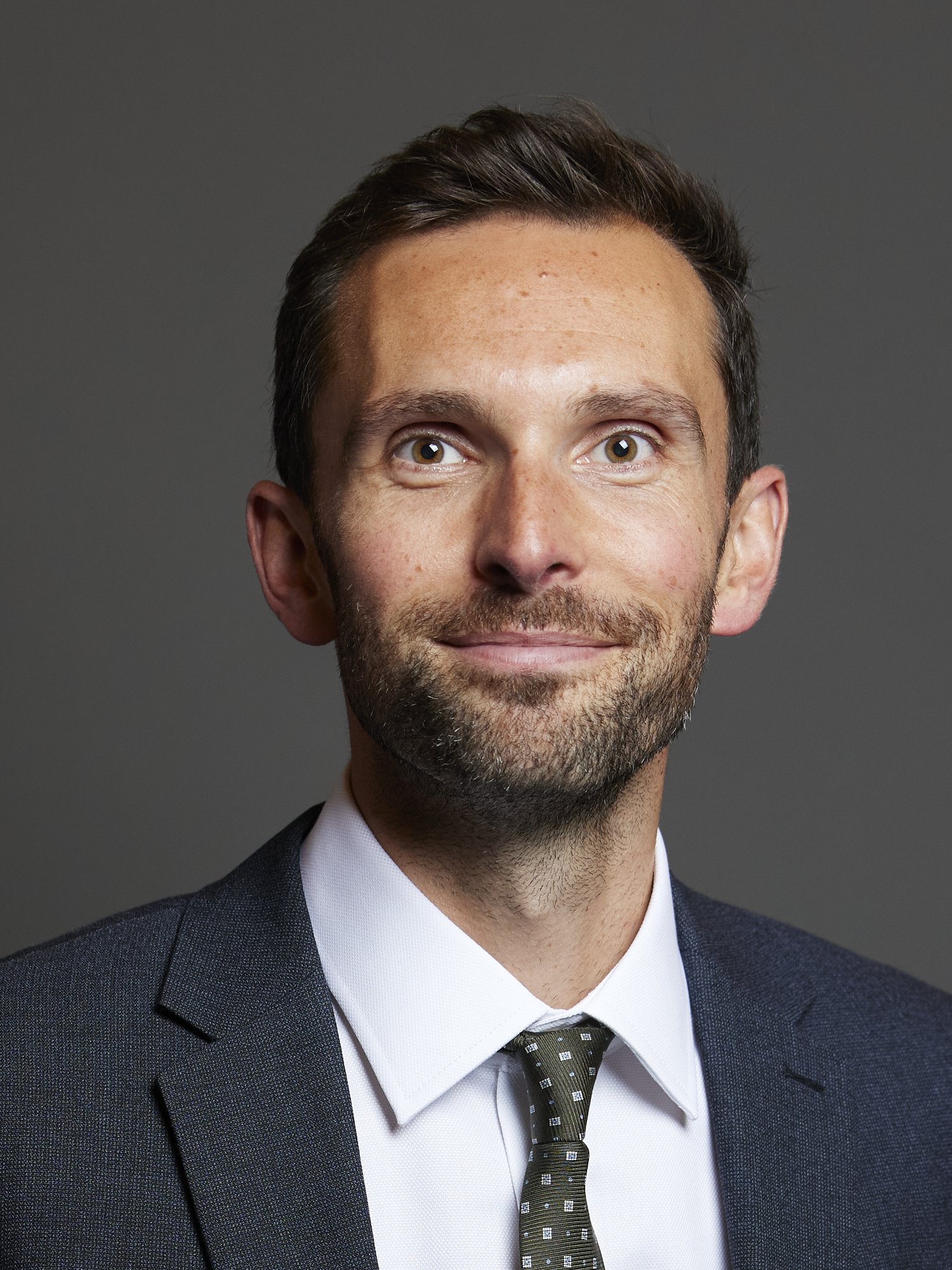
- Official portrait, 2024

Parliamentary Under-Secretary of State for Children and Families
- Incumbent
- Assumed office 7 September 2025
- Prime Minister: Keir Starmer; Andy Burnham
- Preceded by: Janet Daby

Member of Parliament for Whitehaven and Workington
- Incumbent
- Assumed office 4 July 2024
- Preceded by: Constituency established
- Majority: 13,286 (31.7%)

Personal details
- Born: Joshua MacAlister; 3 March 1987 (age 39)
- Party: Labour
- Spouse: Matthew Hood (m. 2019)
- Education: University of Edinburgh (MA); University of Manchester (MA)
- Website: joshmacalister.uk

Joshua MacAlister OBE (born 3 March 1987) is a British Labour politician and former teacher who has been Member of Parliament for Whitehaven and Workington since 2024. He has served as Parliamentary Under-Secretary of State for Children and Families (Minister for Children and Families) since 2025.

== Early life and education ==
MacAlister's father worked as a social worker. He attended Oulder Hill High School in Rochdale

MacAlister attained an MA (Hons) in politics and social policy at the University of Edinburgh. MacAlister served as President of the Edinburgh University Students’ Association. In 2008, he unsuccessfully contested the Presidency of the National Union of Students Scotland.

MacAlister also studied for, and received, a masters degree in leadership in education at the University of Manchester.

== Professional life ==
=== Education ===
MacAlister trained as a teacher through the Teach First Programme and went on to teach citizenship for three and a half years at schools in Oldham.

During his time as a teacher, MacAlister began to engage with young people with experience of the care system. These experiences led MacAlister to establish Frontline, a graduate social worker training programme modelled on Teach First, in 2013. The first cohort began their training the following year.

In 2019, the Department for Education provided Frontline with £45 million in funding.

=== Independent Review of Children's Social Care ===
In January 2021 MacAlister stepped down from his role at Frontline in order to chair an independent review of children's social care. MacAlister's appointment was criticized by some social work academics who questioned whether he could be impartial given that Frontline had received central government funding.

In June 2021, the review published its interim findings. In October 2021 the review published a second report in response to the feedback received on the interim report. The final report of the review was published in May 2022.

=== Member of Parliament ===
In June 2023, MacAlister was selected as the Labour Party's candidate for the newly created constituency of Whitehaven and Workington.

At the 2024 general election, MacAlister was elected as the constituency's MP with 53% of the vote and a majority of over 13,000 votes. He was appointed as Parliamentary Under-Secretary of State (Minister for Children and Families) on 7 September 2025 and reappointed on 22 July 2026.

== Personal life ==
In 2023 MacAlister joined his local mountain rescue team. In July 2024, shortly after being elected as an MP, MacAlister was called out to a mountain rescue.

MacAlister was appointed an Officer of the Order of the British Empire (OBE) in the 2024 New Year Honours for services to vulnerable children.

In 2024, PinkNews listed him as an out LGBTQ+ parliamentarian. He is married to educationalist Matthew Hood.

Parliament of the United Kingdom
New constituency	Member of Parliament for Whitehaven and Workington; 2024–present	Incumbent
