= Wendy Kopp =

American nonprofit executive

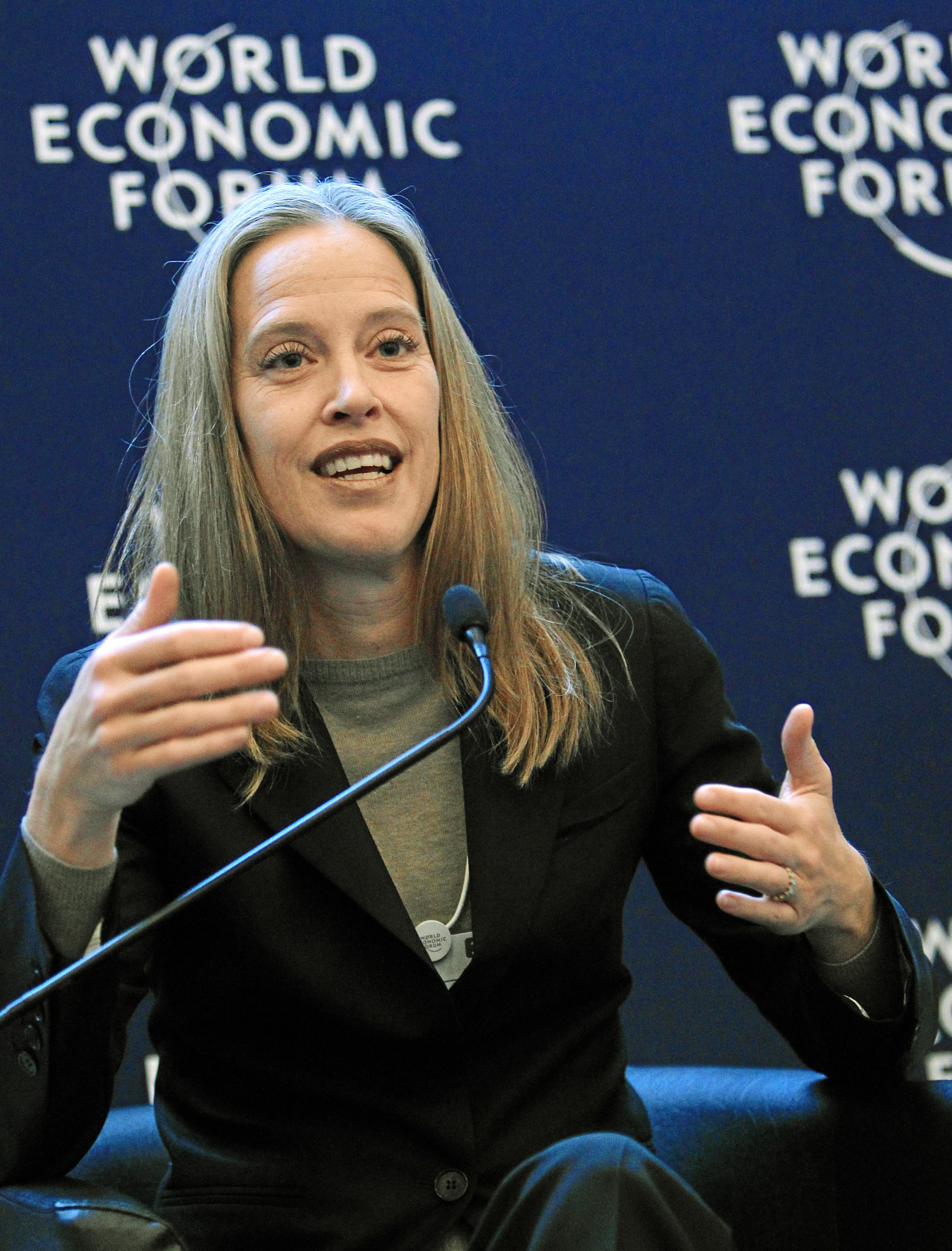
- Kopp in 2012
- Born: Wendy Sue Kopp; June 29, 1967 (age 59); Austin, Texas, U.S.
- Education: Princeton University (Bachelors of Art)

Wendy Sue Kopp (born June 29, 1967) is the CEO and co-founder of Teach For All, a global network of independent nonprofit organizations working to expand educational opportunity in their own countries and the founder of Teach For America (TFA), a national teaching corps.

== Background ==
Wendy Kopp was born in Austin, Texas to parents who operated a small newsletter business informing visitors about attractions in Austin. The family later moved to San Antonio, and then to Dallas, where she attended Highland Park High School. She went on to study as an undergraduate at the School of Public and International Affairs at Princeton University. She received her Arts Baccalaureate degree from Princeton in 1989 and was a member of Princeton's Business Today the University Press Club, as well as the Foundation for Student Communication.

== Teach For America ==
In 1989, Kopp proposed the creation of Teach For America in her 177-page long senior thesis titled "An Argument and Plan for the Creation of the Teachers Corps" which she completed under the supervision of Marvin Bressler. She was convinced that many in her generation were searching for a way to assume a significant responsibility that would make a real difference in the world and that top college students would choose teaching over more lucrative opportunities if a prominent teacher corps existed. During her senior year, she met with large corporation executives about her proposal to which Union Carbide offered her free office space in New York City, and Mobile Oil (now ExxonMobil) gave her a grant $26,000.

Shortly after graduating from Princeton, Kopp founded Teach For America. In 1990, 500 recent college graduates joined Teach For America's charter corps.

In 1993, Kopp was awarded the Princeton Woodrow Wilson Award in which she was the first women and the youngest person to have ever received the award. She was listed as TIME Magazine’s 40 most promising leaders under 40 in 1994, and named TIME’s 100 Most Influential People in 2008.

In 2002, Brett Wigdortz founded Teach First in the UK based on the same idea as Teach For America. In 2007, Kopp and Wigdortz founded Teach For All, a global network of independent nonprofit organizations that apply the same model as Teach For America in other countries. TFA includes programs in 30 countries across six continents, each based on the same grounding principles.

In 2013, Kopp transitioned out of the role of CEO of Teach For America.

Kopp chronicled her experiences at Teach For America in two books, One Day, All Children: The Unlikely Triumph of Teach For America and What I Learned Along the Way and A Chance To Make History: What Works and What Doesn't in Providing an Excellent Education For All.

In 2022, Kopp was chosen as the Baccalaureate Speaker for the Princeton Class of 2022 Baccalaureate Ceremony by the Committee on Honorary Degrees and the Board of Trustees.

== Personal life ==
Wendy Kopp is married to Richard Barth. They have four children and live in Manhattan.

== Awards ==
Honorary doctorates

- 2015: Arizona State University
- 2014: University of Oklahoma
- 2013: Boston University
- 2012: Dartmouth College
- 2012: Harvard University
- 2010: Marquette University
- 2009: Washington University in St. Louis
- 2008: Georgetown University
- 2007: Mount Holyoke College
- 2007: Rhodes College
- 2004: Pace University
- 2004: Mercy College
- 2001: Smith College
- 2000: Princeton University
- 1995: Connecticut College
- 1995: Drew University

Awards

- 2023: ASU+GSV Lifetime Achievement Award
- 2021: WISE Prize for Education
- 2009: The Skoll Award for Social Entrepreneurship
- 2008: Presidential Citizens Medal
- 2008: Schwab Foundation Outstanding Social Entrepreneur Award
- 1993: Princeton Woodrow Wilson Award
- 2006: Golden Plate Award of the American Academy of Achievement
- 1991: The Jefferson Award for Public Service
- 1991: Echoing Green Fellowship

== Trivia ==
On February 5, 2007, Kopp appeared on The Colbert Report.

== Published works ==
- One Day, All Children: The Unlikely Triumph of Teach For America and What I Learned Along the Way (2001)
- A Chance to Make History: What Works and What Doesn't in Providing an Excellent Education for All (2011)
