= Teach First =

British educational non-profit organization

- Formation: 2002; 24 years ago
- Founder: Brett Wigdortz
- Type: Company limited by guarantee and Registered Charity
- Registration no.: Company ref 04478840; Charity ref 1098294
- Purpose: Education
- Headquarters: Greenwich, London
- Location: Various locations throughout England
- Region served: England
- Key people: James Toop, CEO
- Revenue: £58.2m (2024)
- Employees: 1,069 employees, 11 trustees, 610 volunteers (2024)
- Website: teachfirst.org.uk

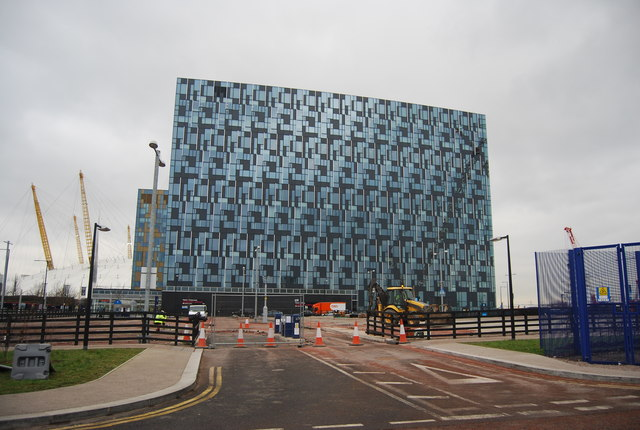
Teach First office building in Greenwich.

Teach First is a social enterprise registered as a charity which aims to address educational disadvantage in England. Teach First coordinates an employment-based teaching training programme whereby participants achieve Qualified Teacher Status through the participation in a two-year training programme that involves the completion of a PGCE along with wider leadership skills training and an optional master's degree.

Trainees are placed at participating primary and secondary schools where they commit to stay for the duration of the 2-year training programme. Eligible schools are those where more than half of the pupils come from the poorest 30% of families according to the Income Deprivation Affecting Children Index. Following completion of the two-year programme, participants become Teach First ambassadors. This network of ambassadors aims to address educational disadvantage either in school or in other sectors.

Teach First is the largest recruiter of graduates in the United Kingdom, and was ranked 2nd only to PwC in The Times annual Top 100 Graduate Employers list in 2014 and 2015.

== History ==
In the summer of 2001 Charles, Prince of Wales as president of Business in the Community hosted a group of business leaders and headteachers. At this event Ian Davis of McKinsey and Company agreed to produce a report on the question of why inner-London Schools were not doing as well as they could do, and what business could do to contribute to the improvement of London schools for the event organisers and London First. The report highlighted the problems with the quality of London's schools, particularly in inner London. It confirmed the link between poverty and educational outcomes and noted that the proportion of pupils on free school meals in inner London was three times the national average. The report also highlighted how the scale of pupil mobility was inhibiting the progress of many young people. Fifteen per cent of students attending inner London schools were entering school, leaving school or changing schools during the school year. This cycle was affecting student performance at age 16.

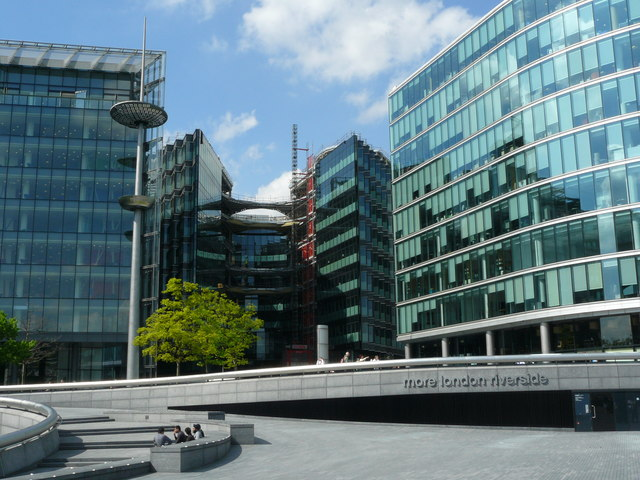
More London, the location of Teach First 2010–2016

In terms of potential solutions McKinsey & Co. reinforced the value of a school being well led by a high quality head teacher, but also highlighted the importance of the quality of classroom teaching. The number of excellent teachers was, they reported, one of the strongest predictors of improved pupil performance, especially in challenging schools. Good teachers made an impact on pupil performance because they:

- Increased pupil motivation
- Improved knowledge transfer
- Provided good role models
- Gave more individual support to pupils
- Monitored pupils' achievements systematically

However, the high vacancy and turnover rates in London were making it difficult to build a group of skilled teachers. Salary levels were also part of the problem – but only a small part of it. Poor management, inadequate resources, long hours, taxing duties, poor student behaviour and a lack of professional opportunities also contributed to the large numbers of teachers leaving the profession. Building on the experience of Teach for America (which had been formed in 1990) McKinsey & Co. proposed creating a programme to recruit and train the best and brightest graduates and place them in London's disadvantaged and underperforming schools.

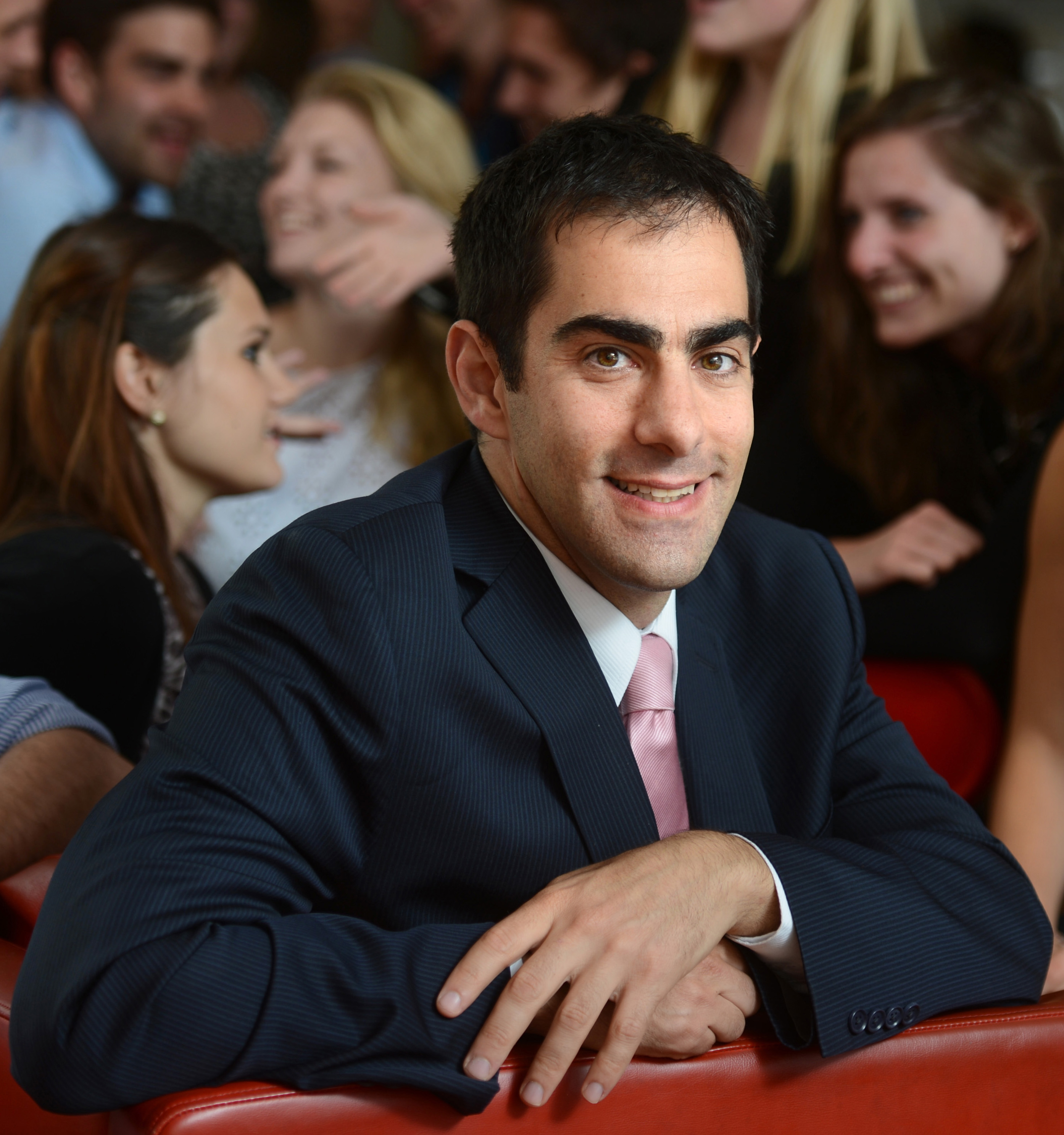
Brett Wigdortz, Teach First founder

One of the consultants involved in compiling the report, Brett Wigdortz, set about developing a business plan for a Teach for America style enterprise in London. In February 2002 Brett took a six-month sabbatical from McKinsey to develop a business plan for what was tentatively called Teach for London before it evolved to become Teach First.

Teach First officially launched in July 2002 in Canary Wharf, with a team of 11 committed employees led by Brett Wigdortz as CEO and Stephen O’Brien CBE and George Iacobescu CBE as co-chairs of the board of trustees. Canary Wharf Group and Citi become the first corporate supporters of Teach First.

Teach First's first cohort of participants started to teach in 45 secondary schools in London. Haling Manor High School in Croydon was the first school to sign up to Teach First. It was based solely in London until September 2006 when it expanded into Greater Manchester schools.

In 2007, Teach First collaborated with Teach for America to create Teach for All, a global network of independent social enterprises that are working to expand educational opportunity in their nations.

Teach First has been supported by politicians of the Labour, Conservative and Liberal Democrat parties.

== Teach First Programme ==
Participants teach in the same school throughout the two years. In the first year, participants work towards a PGDE whilst undertaking around 90% of a Newly Qualified Teacher (NQT) timetable. In their second year participants work as NQTs. Trainees are placed at participating primary and secondary schools where they commit to stay for the duration of the training programme. Eligible schools are those where more than half of the pupils come from the poorest 30% of families according to the Income Deprivation Affecting Children Index. Participants are paid and employed by the schools they are placed at.

Following completion of the two-year programme, participants become Teach First ambassadors. This network of ambassadors aims to address educational disadvantage either in school or in other sectors.

=== Summer Institute ===
Before entering the classroom, participants attend a five-week Summer Institute. Four weeks of this is spent in their region and the final week at a residential course where they learn about the organisation's mission and develop their understanding of educational theory and practice to prepare them to begin teaching in the following September. Participants spend time training in the region in which they will teach, usually with an observation period in the school they will join after the summer. They then attend a residential course together as an entire cohort.

=== Leadership Development ===
Throughout their two years teaching, participants have access to a range of leadership development opportunities. The two-year Leadership Development programme is designed to enable participants to develop knowledge, skills and attributes for use inside and outside the classroom. This training is delivered through workshops, panel events and one to one coaching. For example, participants have access to qualified teacher-led training sessions to provide them with tools and strategies they can apply in their classrooms. They will also attend workshops and reflective seminars to help them develop a good understanding of their strengths and areas for development. In addition, they will have the opportunity to have a coach to help them overcome the challenges they face, as well as business school training to teach them the fundamental aspects of business theory and practice which they can apply to their school context.

Participants also have the opportunity to apply to undertake a one-three week mini-internship during the school holidays – known as a Summer Project. These provide an opportunity to join one of Teach First's supporting or partner organisations to complete or contribute to a short-term goal or objective.

Recruits also have the opportunity to complete a master's degree, starting in their second year on the programme through various partner universities.

== Expansion ==
=== Regional ===
Teach First was initially based solely in London, as part of the London Challenge initiative, until September 2006 when it expanded into Greater Manchester schools. The programme was subsequently extended to cover a total of 11 local areas: East Midlands, London, North East, North West, South Coast, South East, South West, East of England, West Midlands and Yorkshire and the Humber.

In Wales Teach First was given a three-year contract by the Welsh Government to pilot a graduate training programme for three years from 2013 as Teach First Cymru.

Teach First has not been established in Scotland. In 2013 the charity met with the General Teaching Council for Scotland (the independent body for teaching in Scotland) but was told the recruits would not be permitted to teach in Scottish schools, as the General Council will only allow those already holding teaching certificates to teach. At the time, the Educational Institute of Scotland opposed the expansion of Teach First into the country, saying that the scheme "places delivering education cheaply above guaranteeing quality education provision from a fully-qualified teacher workforce". In 2017, the Scottish Government requested bids for a fast-track teacher training scheme, and Teach First considered bidding. However, Scottish universities offering teacher training agreed to not work with Teach First. Teach First eventually decided not to bid, and the tender was awarded to the University of Dundee and the University of the Highlands and Islands

=== Cohort ===
Since launching in 2002, Teach First has placed increasing numbers of participants in schools each year.

Year	No. of Applicants	No. of Incoming Teachers	Success rate of applications	Position in Times Top 100 Graduate Employers
2003		186		62nd
2004		197		42nd
2005		183		19th
2006		265		16th
2007		272		14th
2008		373		9th
2009	2,918	485	16.6%	8th
2010	4,994	560	11.2%	7th
2011	5,324	770	14.5%	7th
2012	7,113	997	14.0%	4th
2013	7,602	1,262	16.6%	3rd
2014	9,000	1,400	15.5%	2nd
2015		1,685		2nd
2024				15th

=== Training provision ===
Teach First expanded from recruiting for secondary school teaching into recruiting primary teachers in 2011.

=== Recruitment ===
Teach First is increasingly seen as attractive to young professionals and career changers with 22% of applicants in 2014 coming from these backgrounds. Teach First launched a new campaign in October 2015 which focuses less on the social reward aspects of teaching and more on the challenge of a teaching career, following research by the Behavioural Insights Team.

== Similar schemes ==
School Direct and School-Centred Initial Teacher Training are school based schemes where participants can earn a salary during training. The Teach First model has also been applied in other areas of public sector recruitment with Frontline for children's social work, Think Ahead for mental-health social work, Police Now a two-year graduate leadership programme of the Metropolitan Police, and Unlocked Graduates for prison officers.

== Alumni ('Ambassadors') ==
As of 2017, 26 ambassadors of the programme were in Head Teacher roles and 36 social enterprises had been founded by ambassadors. Seventeen of these are recognised as official 'Innovation Partners' including The Access Project, Boromi, The Brilliant Club, CPDBee, The Difference, Enabling Enterprise, First Story, Franklin Scholars, Frontline, Future Frontiers, The Grub Club, Hackney Pirates, Jamie's Farm, Maths with Parents, MeeTwo, Right to Succeed and Thinking Reading.

Notable alumni of Teach First include:

- Josh MacAlister (2009 ambassador) – Founder and CEO of Frontline social work charity, Member of Parliament (MP) for Whitehaven and Workington
- Stephanie Peacock (2010 ambassador) – Member of Parliament (MP) for Barnsley East
- William Wragg (2014 ambassador) – Member of Parliament (MP) for Hazel Grove
- Matt Hood OBE (2007 ambassador) - CEO Oak National Academy

== Criticism ==
Criticisms have been raised about the cost effectiveness of Teach First, with training costs higher per participant when compared to other training routes.

Teach First asks for the graduates it recruits to give two years of teaching, and so retention rates for Teach First are lower than other routes into teaching – forty per cent of Teach First participants stay in teaching after 5 years compared to much higher percentages (ranging from 62 to 70%) coming through PGCE and GTP programmes. It is anticipated and accepted that many of them will go on to careers in other sectors, hence the name Teach First. Jane Simon, writing in The Mirror, noted that the name Teach First could be interpreted as "teach first, then get a better job". It has been alleged that the higher turnover rate and rapidly increasing cohort size of Teach First have allowed schools to reduce their costs by employing teaching staff at unqualified teacher pay scales, and that Teach First participants have been targeted by some academy school chains because of this.

Teach First has been accused of elitism, and its application process has also been accused of being biased towards middle-class applicants. Teach First participants interviewed as part of an evaluation were predominantly middle‐class, possessing social and cultural capital which had facilitated their access to the Teach First scheme. A study by London Metropolitan University found some recruits displayed patronising middle-class attitudes, coupled with a belief that they, as graduates of prestigious universities, have much to offer but nothing to learn from low-income communities.

In 2009 it was reported that Teach First participants were being placed in schools where GCSE grades were above the local and national averages, and not in the worst performing secondary schools. Education Data Surveys analysed the results of all the schools involved in Teach First and found 15 of the 79 London secondaries (19 per cent) had GCSE achievements above their local authority average, and 17 schools had results above the national average. In the North West, five Teach First schools, or 23 per cent, had exam results which were the same or better than the local authority average. In the Midlands, results at five schools, or 18 per cent, were the same or better than the local authority average and two had results at or above the national average, raising the question of why schools with GCSE results up to 80 and 70 per cent were taking part.

In response, Teach First said that exam results were not the "whole story" of the initiative, and the number of children claiming free school meals was as important in selecting schools to be involved, stating "Teach First selects the schools into which it places exceptional graduates through consideration of a range of criteria that indicate the level of challenge experienced at the school, including the percentage of free schools meals, the exam results at GCSE, staff turnover and the difficulties experienced by schools in recruiting new teachers."

Teach First's relationship with businesses and deferred entry schemes has opened it to suggestions that it operates as an elite graduate scheme for them to recruit from.

Teach First has also been said to place too much emphasis on schools in London, where it places 40% of its recruits. It has been subject to criticism that London and larger cities are able to attract the best graduates, but coastal and rural communities struggle to attract these graduates. Brett Wigdortz in response said, "We made the same mistake many implementations make – starting in the place where it's easiest to implement things, the big cities, and taking a while to get to the areas which really need it".

The Teach First model whereby teachers enter the classroom after only a six-week summer camp can leave recruits feeling that their in-class support levels are variable. A Teach First recruit has said the experience left her feeling expendable, saying the Teach First leadership were more focussed on expansion rather than the experience of recruits in a "survival of the fittest" atmosphere. Teach First had a 92% retention rate of recruits in 2012, with the recruit earning a "good" teacher label by observers.

The "London effect", where the capital has seen a turnaround in educational achievement since the millennium, has seen Teach First (and other interventions such as the London Challenge and the rise of academies) being credited with the turnaround of education in London. However, an academic study's analysis showed that this improvement instead came from gradual improvements in primary education in the capital.

In 2017 the Journalist and director of the New Schools Network, Toby Young, attended a social mobility summit hosted by Teach First, who asked him to write a blog for them. Teach First disagreed with the content of the work submitted by Young, and published it with a rebuttal from another author working in the field. Teach First then decided that they were in error to publish the blog, even with a rebuttal, and removed it as being against their values and vision, stating that they did not want to act as a platform for the views contained therein. Toby Young claimed that he only found out about this decision via Twitter, and questioned why Teach First published it in the first place, stating that he felt as though he had been censored by the charity. Teach First apologised to Young and he accepted their apology.

In June 2020 Teach First failed to provide places on its programme to 120 trainees due to lack of training opportunities because of COVID-19, sending out a generic email. Some prospective trainees has already given up steady jobs in order to take up placements.

== See also ==
- Tough Young Teachers – a BBC documentary following graduates on the Teach First programme
