= London Challenge =

School improvement initiative in London, England

The London Challenge was a school improvement programme launched by the UK's Labour Government in 2003. The policy document "Transforming London Secondary Schools" set out the aims of the programme, which was designed to create a "step change" in the performance of London secondary schools.

The initiative has been credited by Ofsted and others for a significant improvement in London's state education system. More recent studies have identified the London Challenge as one factor in several that contributed to significant enhancements in pupil outcomes.

The London Challenge programme was initially aimed at secondary schools and was intended to run until 2008. However, it was subsequently extended until 2011, and expanded to include primary schools, and two additional City Challenge areas; Greater Manchester and the Black Country.

== History ==
=== London Challenge (2003 - 2011) ===
In 2002, the British Government created a new set of policies focusing on London's state secondary schools, which were at that time performing poorly in comparison to the rest of the country. The policies were collectively known as the London Challenge and their objectives were:

- to raise standards in the poorest performing schools;
- to narrow the attainment gap between pupils in London;
- to create more good and outstanding schools.

The London Challenge depended on close cooperation with Local Authorities, and in particular five Key Areas were singled out for close attention, Tower Hamlets, Newham, Lewisham, Hackney, Westminster.

One of the distinctive features of London Challenge was a focus on partnership and shared purpose between schools, whilst avoiding stigmatising schools through the use of negative language. The term "Keys to Success" was used to identify those schools that would require the most intensive intervention. A series of "sector led" support mechanisms were put in place. Independent, experienced education experts, known as London Challenge Advisers, were appointed to each of the Keys to Success schools to provide tailored help. The advisers were supported by an administrative team in the Department for Education (DfE). They worked closely with experienced education professionals, appointed by the DfE, known as National Leaders of Education (NLE) or Local Leaders of Education (LLE), as well as local authority appointed School Improvement Partners (SIP) and other local authority officers to develop a bespoke intervention programmes. The cost of the support and the services brokered by the adviser came directly from the DfE. In some areas school improvement services were outsourced to consultants, though from 2007 specialist services to the Keys to Success schools were supplied by a single education consultancy company under a Challenge Service Contract.

School to school peer support was also a feature of the London Challenge programme. Some particularly successful schools were awarded Teaching School status, giving them the remit and opportunity to support other schools in their local community. Another initiative was the annual "Families of Schools" report which grouped all of London's state schools into numbered families with other similar schools. This was aimed at middle and senior leaders in schools, allowing them to compare their performance with their peer schools and to share best practice on improvement initiatives, although there is no evidence that the resource was widely used for those purposes. In fact, it was published so late that its impact was diminished.

The London Challenge incorporated the 14-19 Pathfinders initiative which aimed to define and develop improved "learning pathways" for students in this age group.

For schools that needed support beyond the classroom, the Extended School concept was introduced, creating hubs for services to be offered directly to students and their families. The London Challenge also introduced the Teach First initiative to encourage highly academic graduates into the teaching profession.

In 2008 the Government announced an expansion of the London Challenge to include primary schools, and the programme was extended until 2011.

=== City Challenge (2008 - 2011) ===
The 2008 extension of the London Challenge initiative also expanded it to include two new geographical areas – Greater Manchester and the Black Country. The programme was renamed for those areas as the City Challenge, but continued to be known as the London Challenge in the capital. The City Challenge programme was tailored to local needs, using many of the same approaches adopted in the London Challenge.

== Evaluation ==
Ofsted first reported on the impact of the London Challenge in 2006, and found that, between 2001 and 2005, London's GCSE results had improved faster in London than in England as a whole. A subsequent report in 2010 corroborated those findings, finding that the "London Challenge has continued to improve outcomes for pupils in London’s primary and secondary schools at a faster rate than nationally. London’s secondary schools continue to perform better than those in the rest of England".

A Government commissioned report from the Institute for Policy Studies in Education, published in 2012, evaluated the outcomes of the City Challenge programme and, retrospectively the London Challenge Programme. It found that the majority of the initial targets were achieved, and while acknowledging the backdrop of wider educational initiatives concluded that the "most plausible explanation for the greater improvement in Challenge areas is that the City Challenge programme was responsible".

A report from the Joseph Rowntree Foundation in 2014 concluded that "during the period of the London Challenge, secondary school performance in London saw a dramatic improvement, and local authorities in inner London went from the worst performing to the best performing nationally." However they noted the difficulty of isolating the specific effect of the London Challenge against a wider background of education policy changes. The report's assessment of the City Challenge was more mixed "in part because [the City Challenge areas] had less time for these practices to properly embed." However it was found that some positive developments had been sustained beyond the end of the City Challenge programme in 2011.

The same year, the Institute for Fiscal Studies, in partnership with the government's Social Mobility Commission published analysis suggesting that improvements in secondary school performance were largely attributable to improvements in attainment at primary school level.

Also in 2014, an investigation into the reported success of London schools during the period of the London Challenge was published by the CfBT Education Trust, The Centre for Education and Youth (then known as LKMco) and The Centre for London. This concluded that success was unlikely to be explained by contextual advantages such as gentrification, ethnicity and opportunity. Nor could success be fully attributed to resourcing factors such as finance, teacher recruitment and school building quality, although these did help the improvements to "flourish". The success was instead attributed to a focus on the teaching workforce and on the widespread and sustained availability of support built on ambitious expectations coupled with a willingness to intervene in response to low standards. The authors argued that these approaches were exemplified within four programmes: London Challenge, Teach First, the academies programme and improved support from local authorities. Together, these initiatives were said to have established an ecosystem of collaboration and "effective leadership at every level of the system." The investigation's conclusions have since been thrown into question by subsequent studies and one of the report's co-authors has written a number of commentaries on developments in the evidence base.

Later in 2014, research from the University of Bristol largely attributed London's improvements in pupil progress over the London Challenge period to ethnic composition rather than specific Government interventions. Nevertheless, the paper concluded that "for other measures of attainment, the London premium is halved but remains significant."

A subsequent report by the Centre for Analysis of Social Exclusion at the LSE demonstrated that most of the London effect could be accounted for by the improved performance in London primary schools, that there had not been any significant difference in the ethnic composition in London over the timeframe studied, and that the improved performance in primaries certainly coincided with the introduction of the National Literacy Strategies, though why they might have had more impact in London than elsewhere wasn't certain. The report is called Understanding the improved performance of disadvantaged pupils in London, and can be found online.

In August 2018 the Department for Education published a follow up qualitative study by The Centre for Education and Youth which compared school cultures and practices of schools inside and outside of London. The study concluded that although there were some distinctive cultures and practices in high-performing schools in the capital, these were unlikely to be "necessary or sufficient conditions" for the ‘London Effect’.

In November 2020 another study for the Department for Education (DfE) by researchers from Kantar Group and the DfE used data from the Longitudinal Study of Young People in England to analyse drivers of the London effect. The study once again questioned the role of London Challenge by showing limited school effects on attainment, instead concluding that the London effect could largely be explained by 'Agency Factors' such as parental aspirations and expectations.

The UK's national media has shown a strong interest in the success of the London Challenge and its legacy.
