= Impact of the COVID-19 pandemic on education in the United Kingdom =

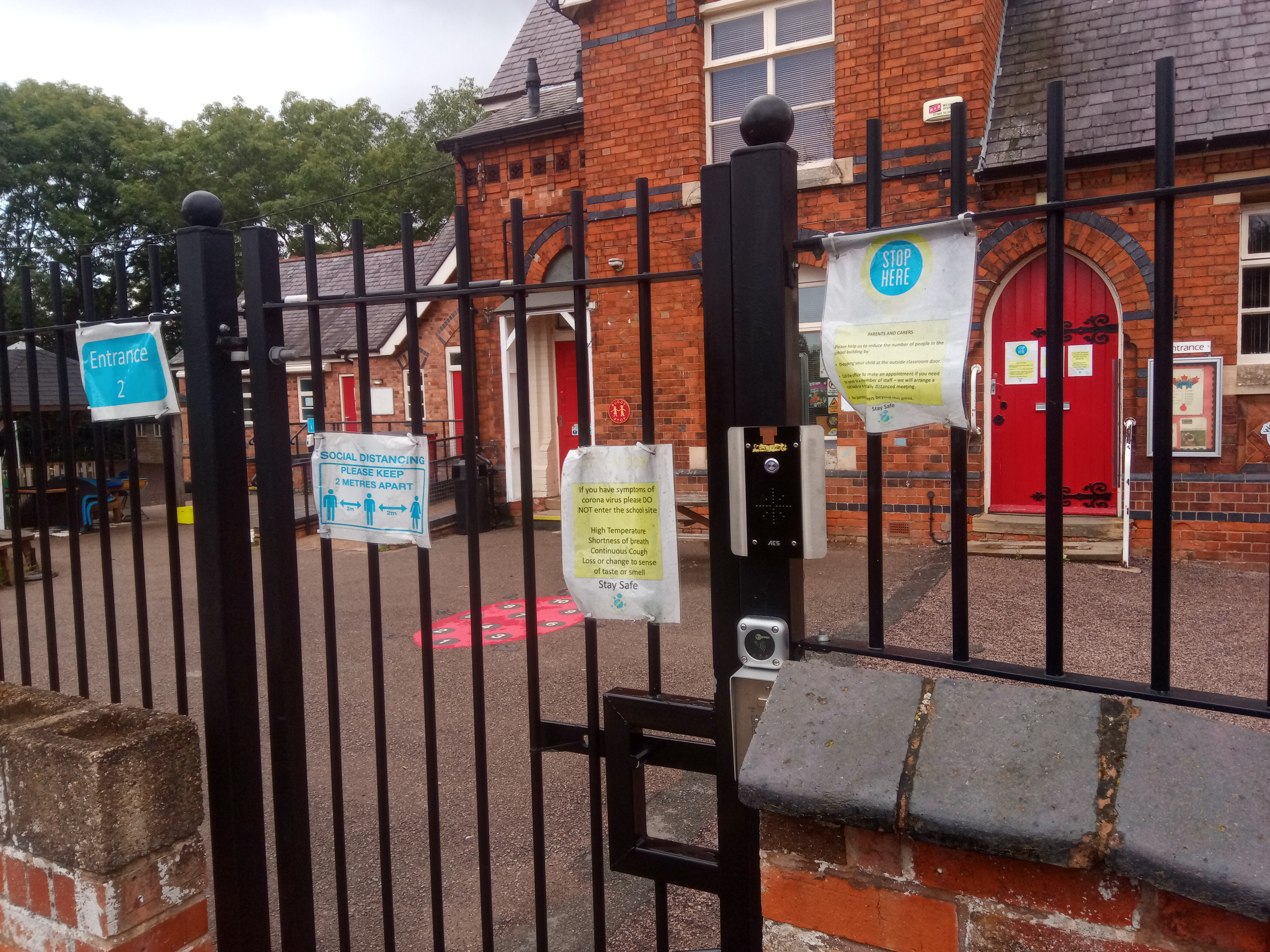
Signs related to the COVID-19 pandemic at a primary school in Seagrave.

In March 2020, nurseries, schools, and colleges in the United Kingdom were shut down in response to the COVID-19 pandemic. By 20 March, all schools in the UK had closed for all in-person teaching, except for children of key workers and children considered vulnerable. With children at home, teaching took place online. The emergence of a new variant of COVID-19 in December 2020 led to cancellation of face-to-face teaching across England, Northern Ireland, Scotland, and Wales the following month.

Universities had a range of approaches to dealing the pandemic. Some taught exclusively online, such as the University of Cambridge, while most adopted a 'blended' model which mixed remote and in-person teaching. GCSE and A-level exams and their Scottish equivalents were cancelled, with grades assigned based on teacher predictions after controversy about the method.

Education in the United Kingdom is delegated to the four nations: education in Scotland, Wales and Northern Ireland is devolved to the Scottish Government, the Welsh Government and the Northern Ireland Executive, respectively, whilst the UK Government is responsible for education in England.

== Timeline ==
=== Late February to mid-March – individual closures ===
Following cases in Italy, the Cransley School in Northwich, Cheshire, and Trinity Catholic College in Middlesbrough closed, as some of their pupils had returned with symptoms from Italy. Fourteen schools in England had closed by 28 February. Loughborough University reported a student confirmed to have the virus after recent travel to Italy, and indicated that several staff members and students began self-isolation.

=== Mid-March – nationwide shutdown ===
On 18 March, the Welsh government announced that all schools in Wales would be closing by 20 March. On the same day, the First Minister of Scotland Nicola Sturgeon announced that Scottish schools would also be closing from 20 March, and may not reopen before the summer. Later that day, it was announced that schools in Northern Ireland would close to pupils immediately and to staff on 20 March. Shortly thereafter, the Secretary of State for Education, Gavin Williamson announced that schools in England would close from 20 March for an unspecified length of time. Prime Minister Boris Johnson said that schools would still look after the children of key workers, and vulnerable children, and for England the Department for Education published guidance on eligibility on 19 March.

The Coronavirus Act 2020, which came into force on 25 March, gave the relevant ministers and departments across the UK powers to shut educational institutions and childcare premises.

The UK government also announced that GCSE and A Level exams were to be cancelled, an unprecedented action in UK educational history, and that grades were to be given out based on predicted grades and teacher assessment.

Following these impacts, the Quality Assurance Agency for Higher Education published various resources on securing academic standards during the rapid move to online provision and assessment, such as "COVID-19: Thematic Guidance - Securing Academic Standards and Supporting Student Achievement".

=== June to September – reopening ===
Kirsty Williams, Education Minister at one of the Welsh Government's daily press announcements. Here, she announces that schools in Wales would reopen on the 29 June.

Primary schools in England began to open more widely on 1 June, beginning with nursery classes and children in the year groups Reception (aged 4–5), Year 1 (aged 5–6) and Year 6 (aged 10–11), although many schools and local councils delayed until after this date. It was planned that all primary-age pupils would be back in school by the end of June, but on 9 June the government announced that primary schools would not reopen further to other year groups due to concerns on the impact this could have on the rate of infection. Instead, most primary school children returned to classes in early September, almost six months after schools closed.

Secondary schools in England reopened for year groups 10 (aged 14–15) and 12 (aged 16–17) from 15 June. However, schools had been instructed to continue to primarily educate young people in these age groups at home, and to keep face-to-face lessons to a minimum. Secondary students returned in full at the start of the new academic year in September.

School attendance was not compulsory for pupils in England, regardless of whether they had a place available or not, until the start of the 2020–21 academic year.

Meanwhile, schools in Wales reopened on 29 June, and although all year groups returned, until the summer holidays attendance was non-compulsory and part-time. In the new academic year schools reopened at full capacity with some changes to ensure social distancing remained in place. Scottish schools reopened between 11 and 18 August; it was at first intended that they would operate a "blended model" of part-time study at school and at home, though it was later decided that schools would aim to open full-time as soon as they returned. Schools in Northern Ireland reopened for "key cohorts" (students studying for exams or transitioning between schools) in August, and for others in September.

=== December to January – resurgence and new mass closures ===
Amidst exponential growth of cases, on 13 December the London borough of Greenwich instructed its schools to switch to remote learning. The London boroughs of Islington and Waltham Forest took similar steps the following day, while Redbridge council stating it would support its schools if they want to move to online teaching. Gavin Williamson ordered the schools to stay open for face-to-face teaching, and Greenwich council reversed its decision in the face of threats of legal action from the government. In December, the Scottish government announced that schools would only be open for children of key workers and the most vulnerable children for the first week of term, with online beginning for most people on 11 January.

After the Christmas break, teaching unions recommended keeping schools closed. On 4 January, the governments of Wales, Scotland and then England introduced further measures to deal with the second wave. Schools in Wales would remain shut for in-person teaching in favour of online teaching; some schools had been due to resume in-person teaching on 6 January. In Scotland a new lockdown included postponing the opening of schools for face-to-face teaching until 1 February, instead moving to online teaching. In England, schools had already started to open when they were instructed to switch to remote learning until at least the February half term. Schools in Northern Ireland also closed, although nurseries and special schools were kept open.

=== Spring 2021 – second reopening ===
Younger primary school children in Scotland and Wales returned to the classroom from 22 February. All primary schools in England reopened on 8 March whilst secondary schools opened in a staggered manner beginning on that date. Northern Ireland's youngest schoolchildren also returned on the same date. In Wales and Scotland, older primary school pupils returned to lessons and secondary schools began to reopen on 15 March. Northern Ireland's oldest school students returned to studying in person on 22 March.

=== Later developments ===
In December 2021, the Department for Education asked retired teachers to return to teaching in England from January. This was in anticipation of an increase in staff absence due to the Omicron Covid variant. The Department of Education in Northern Ireland made similar requests to recently retired teachers.

Amid ongoing omicron related fears, new guidelines released in Wales on 1 January stated that whether pupils would be educated online or in the classroom would be delegated to individual local authorities and schools. The following day, it was announced that face mask requirements would be tightened in England on a temporary basis for secondary school pupils as part of the measures to combat Omicron.

The obligation for secondary school pupils to wear facemasks in secondary school classrooms ended in England with guidance that they be used in communal areas removed soon after. Obligatory facemasks in classrooms were removed in Scotland (where they have been a far more long term aspect of school life during the pandemic) on 28 February. That change was also made in Wales on the same day. The end of facemasks in Northern Ireland's secondary classrooms was announced on 11 March to begin on 21 March.

== Schooling in Lockdown ==
=== Home learning ===
Students were encouraged to keep on studying at home with many parents becoming responsible for their children's education. Many teachers continued to set work for and interact with pupils online.

The launch of Oak National Academy was announced in April 2020, providing teachers with free online lessons. Oak delivered two million lessons in its first week of operation. The TES and Oak National Academy also ran weekly assemblies, with speakers including The Duchess of Cambridge, the Prime Minister and the Archbishop of Canterbury.

Fitness coach Joe Wicks released a series of training videos targeted primarily at schoolchildren to help them remain active whilst at home. BBC Bitesize also provided a range of resources to help children, young people and parents. The Bitesize website had 1.6 million individual users on the day its lockdown learning programme was launched whilst CBBC had a 436% increase in viewership during the slot when educational programming was broadcast.

Research conducted by the Office of National Statistics suggested that school aged children in Great Britain completed on average 11 hours of study at home per week this was roughly the same regardless of how many children or adults were in the household, however, children tended to do less schoolwork if they were younger or when there was a child under five-years-old in the household. Other studies suggested that many students had completed little or no academic work during the lockdown.

=== School exams ===
On 20 March 2020, the government announced that, due to the COVID-19 pandemic, all secondary education examinations due to be held in 2020 were cancelled. As a result, an alternative method had to be designed and implemented at short notice to determine the qualification grades to be given to students for that year. In their place, qualification grades were to be based on teacher-predicted grades combined with a moderation process to be defined by Ofqual. An outcry ensued when, after the release of the A level results on 13 August, it became apparent that the moderation algorithm used had delivered some controversial results. Following increasing pressure to and public opinion, the regulator decided to withdraw the computed results, and to regrade students based solely on the original teacher predictions. Before the GCSE grades were released on 20 August, it was decided that they would be based on the teacher predictions too. Similar moderation systems and reversals to teachers predictions took place in Scotland, Wales and Northern Ireland.

In November 2020, the Welsh government cancelled GCSEs and A-levels for 2021 with grades decided based on classroom assessment. The following month the Scottish government cancelled higher exams for 2021, with teachers deciding on final grade. When schools in England and Northern Ireland generally closed to face-to-face teaching in early 2021 the respective governments cancelled GCSEs and A-levels due to take place that year; grades in England would be awarded based on teachers' estimates rather than the algorithm used in the summer of 2020.

=== School inspections ===
Ofsted suspended routine inspections from 17 March 2020, and the Secretary of State for Education issued successive monthly notices which suspended sections of the Education Act 2005, extending until at least the end of June 2021. The Independent Schools Inspectorate also suspended routine work in March 2020, although the Department for Education could still commission Material Change Visits, Additional Inspections and Progress Monitoring Visits.

== Universities ==
=== March 2020 – Closures ===
Cambridge University was criticised for their incoherent response to the pandemic which required international students and staff to make arrangements to return home with only two days' notice. On 13 March, students and staff were advised that international travel was discouraged and university facilities would stay open at reduced capacity. On 18 March, Vice Chancellor Stephen Toope announced a sudden U-turn: all university buildings would be indefinitely shut to staff and students from the afternoon of Friday 20 March, and all students were strongly encouraged to leave Cambridge. The president of Cambridge UCU criticised this sudden shutdown, saying it would exacerbate the pandemic as students from countries with weaker healthcare provisions were forced to return home.

Over a thousand Cambridge students signed an open letter requesting to have multiple assessment options in lieu of the cancelled examinations, including the option to retake part or all of the academic year in 2020–21.

Coventry University first suspended graduation ceremonies due to be held in March and April, and from 20 March, suspended all face-to-face teaching, in favour of on-line delivery. Other higher education institutions took similar steps around the same time. Many students from overseas, who could not afford to travel or found their flights cancelled, were unable to return home.

=== September 2020 – Reopening ===
Practical support is essential for those in isolation or quarantine. People who receive help from outside the home are more likely to adhere.

— 'Principles for Managing SARS-CoV-2 Transmission Associated with Higher Education', 3 September 2020

For the 2020/21 academic year, most universities adopted a blended learning approach with a mixture of online and in-person teaching. In early September the Scientific Advisory Group for Emergencies warned "It is highly likely that there will be significant outbreaks associated with higher education, and asymptomatic transmission may make these harder to detect", though noted that universities were "well advanced in their plans to manage their campus and delivery of education". At the time, the number of confirmed cases in the UK was increasing.

On 25 September, Manchester Metropolitan University locked down two of its halls of accommodation, placing 1,700 students in isolation for 14 days after 127 across the halls had tested positive.

According to an assessment from the Department for Education in September 2020, 39% of students were enrolled in courses that were classroom based, and may be adapted to online delivery, 22% in subjects that required some in-person teaching, and 39% in courses with "extensive contact hours or practical elements".

On 6 November 2020, students at the University of Manchester found that fences had been erected around their halls of residence, preventing access in or out of the buildings; subsequent protests involved tearing down the fences, though the university claimed there had been no intention to restrict access.

In March 2021, students at the University of Manchester held a vote of no confidence in the leadership of their Vice-Chancellor, Nancy Rothwell, due to her handling of the university's response to the COVID-19 pandemic; the vote passed with 89% in favour.

== COVID-19 in schools ==
SAGE advised that opening schools will likely increase the rate of COVID-19 transmission while noting that it is "difficult to quantify the level of transmission taking place specifically within schools compared to other settings". The NASUWT teachers' union contacted 28 local authorities for data on COVID-19 rates amongst school staff in the autumn term. Of the three that responded, rates amongst staff were much higher than the levels in their local authorities.

The Schools Infection Survey monitors infection rates in staff and students at schools in England. As part of the survey, 10,000 people were tested for COVID-19 in November 2020; 1.24% of pupils and 1.29% of staff tested positive. The study excluded people with clear symptoms as they should not be attending school. SAGE noted that the "data is unweighted, and so cannot be generalised to the school population as a whole." Minutes from a SAGE meeting in November recorded that there is evidence that pre-school and primary children are less susceptible to catching COVID-19 than adults, though it is unclear whether secondary school children are also less susceptible.

As of 4 January 2021, the Department for Education does not have information on how many school staff have died of COVID-19, and has not released its data on illness rates.

== Aftermath ==
A report published in November 2020 by Ofsted on the impact of the COVID-19 pandemic on children in England after their first period out of school found that whilst some children had coped well with lockdown often enjoying the extra time with their families, others had struggled, regressing academically and losing basic skills such as young children who had previously been potty trained returning to wearing nappies. The report indicated that children with special educational needs had been particularly badly impacted by the pandemic.

Polling suggested that three quarters of parents felt that teaching their children at home had made them more knowledgeable. Whilst, 29% said they had learned something new from the experience and the same number thought it had made them a better parent. 37% believed they were now better equipped to help their children with schoolwork in the future. Between September 2020 and April 2021, the number of children across the UK being taken out of school to be educated at home on a permanent basis increased by 75% in comparison to previous years.

Reporting conducted in late 2021 into the impact of the COVID-19 on schools in Scotland suggested that pupils behaviour had worsened since the pandemic and that academic standards had fallen. The pandemic had reportedly impacted children's development with unusually immature classes in their first year of secondary school needing to be treated like primary school pupils. Frequent absences among teachers due to needing to isolate was leading to lessons being run at maximum size adding to issues with discipline whilst common absences among the students also disrupted their progress. Whilst, some pupils had simply not returned to school after lockdown and whereabouts were unknown.

=== Higher Education ===
a study conducted in 2022 about the impact of COVID-19 on university students shows that many students in higher education felt that the pandemic had negatively impacted their university experience. It shows that 'Of the sample, 62 [of 82] participants reported that the pandemic had negatively impacted their education in a range of ways. The theme of Education comprises five categories: Inability to study effectively, lack of value for money, impact on grades, reduction in teaching quality and lack of support.'

Some students have sued universities on the grounds that the quality of teaching offered during the pandemic years was substantially poor. This article from the BBC shows that around 5,000 students have brought claims against UCL, after teaching was moved online or cancelled over the quality of teaching.

=== Focus on Digital Inclusion ===
With the turn to digital modes of education and assessment, the Uk government started focusing on the digital divide as can be seen in this rapid response report published in December 2020. The report recognises that many children may have experienced disruption to their education as an Ofcom survey found that 9% of households containing children did not have home access to a laptop, desktop PC or tablet. As a response, the Department for Education provided laptops, tablets and 4G routers to disadvantaged children who could not access these from other sources such as their school during the 2020 summer term, with further devices being distributed in the 2020–21 school year. Additionally, the government recognises that problems of digital inclusion have become especially 'acute' during the pandemic.

== See also ==
- COVID-19 pandemic in the United Kingdom
- Education in the United Kingdom
- Impact of the COVID-19 pandemic on education
