= Contextual value added =

UK school statistic

Contextual value added (CVA) is a statistic that was used by the government of the United Kingdom to assess the performance of schools. It was superseded by expected progress and then Progress 8.

The statistic is intended to show the progress children have made whilst attending a particular school. Unlike statistics such as exam performance, contextual value added attempts to take into account the circumstances of children attending the school that are beyond the school's control.

== Description ==
The statistic works by comparing a child's performance with that of children with a similar prior performance and similar circumstances. There are three levels: Level 1 measures performance of primary age children. It measures the performance of pupils between the end of Key Stage 1 and the end of Key Stage 2. It is based on a median score of 100. Level 2 CVA measures performance of secondary schools (i.e. between the end of Key Stage 2 and the end of Key Stage 4). Unlike Level 1 CVA, Level 2 CVA is based on a median score of 1000. Level 3 CVA measures performance of post 16 pupils from the end of Key Stage 4 to the end of Key Stage 5. Like Level 2 CVA, it is measured on a median score of 1000

CVA takes into account nine factors that are known to affect the performance of children but are outside of the school's control. The factors are

- Gender
- Special Educational Needs
- Eligibility for free school meals.
- First language
- Whether pupils move between schools
- Ethnicity
- The age (i.e. the month they were born in) of different pupils within the year group
- Whether a pupil has been taken into care (e.g. Foster Care) at any stage
- The level of deprivation in the area the pupil lives (using the Income Deprivation Affecting Children Index)

In 2009, there will additionally be bonuses provided for the inclusion of English and mathematics- these are based on a pilot which took place in 2008.

== Criticisms ==
The statistic is not without questions as to its accuracy and its use. For example, care needs to be taken when making comparisons between small differences. In particular, CVA has a margin of error, and the degree of uncertainty in the score increases as the size of the cohort decreases. For example, a different set of students at the same school will almost certainly produce differing CVA scores. The nature of Contextual Value Added being averaged across the country also means that it is not possible to directly compare an individual school's score across a number of years. Some schools have also claimed that contextual value added disadvantages schools with a record of high performance.
