= Teach First Deutschland =

Teach First Deutschland is a German non-profit organization started in 2008 and adapted from Teach For America and Teach First. In an effort to help eliminate educational inequity, it recruits exceptional graduates from across all subject areas and places them for two years in challenging German schools.

Currently, ~120 graduates ("fellows") spend their two-year service in schools in the federal states of Baden-Württemberg, Berlin, Hamburg, North Rhine-Westphalia and Thuringia to improve student-performance. Fellows are trained in a 3-month preparation phase.

While fellows are paid by the participating federal states, the organization has been supported by different foundations (Bosch-, Hertie-, Vodafone- and ZEIT-Stiftung) as well as German businesses, among them Deutsche Post DHL, Lanxess, Haniel, Lufthansa, McKinsey & Company and Siemens.

Berlin's Education Secretary of State judged the impact of the program so far as "downright positive".

Teach First Deutschland is a member of Teach For All, a global network of independent social enterprises working to expand educational opportunity.
