= The Brilliant Club =

British charitable organization

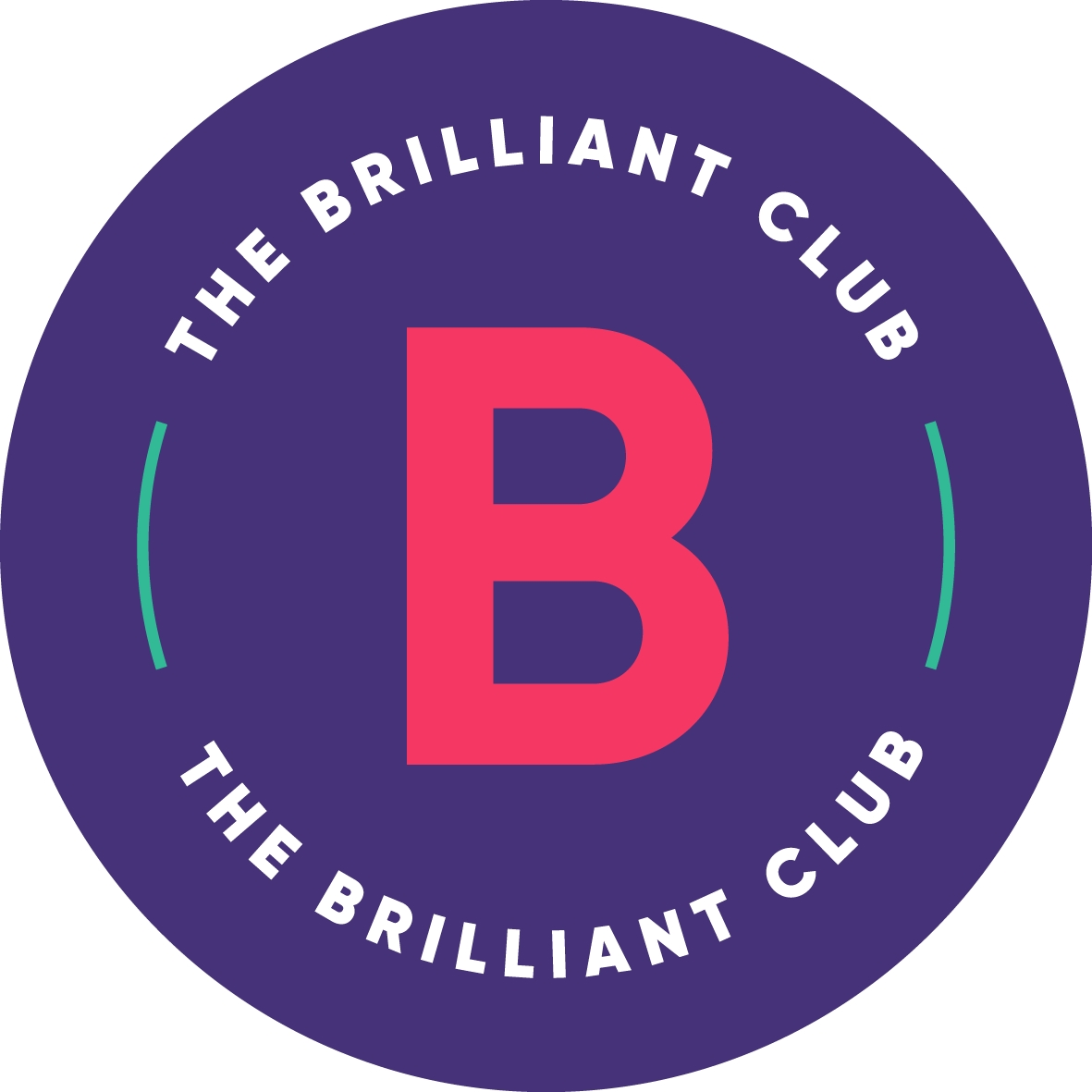
- Formation: 2011
- Legal status: Charity
- Headquarters: Fivefields, London
- Services: Education
- CEO: Susie Whigham
- Website: thebrilliantclub.org

The Brilliant Club is a UK-wide social mobility charity focused on increasing the number of less advantaged students accessing the most competitive universities and supporting them to succeed when they get there. Their flagship Scholars Programme, which launched in 2011, supports students aged 8–18 to progress to the most competitive universities, including Russell Group universities, by giving them the opportunity to learn topics outside of the curriculum and experience university-style learning.

The Brilliant Club was co-founded in 2011 by school teachers Jonathan Sobczyk and Simon Coyle. The charity has offices in London and Leeds, and operates across England, Wales, Scotland and Northern Ireland. In 2026, Susie Whigham was appointed CEO. Between 2020 and 2025, Anne-Marie Canning MBE acted as the charity's CEO.

== Programmes ==
The Brilliant Club runs programmes which aim to break down barriers to access to and success in higher education. The charity responds to what it sees as the inequality of the UK higher education system. According to data provided by the University and Colleges Admissions Service (UCAS), students from the most advantaged backgrounds have a 1 in 3 chance of going to the most competitive universities, compared with 1 in 33 for the least advantaged.

The "flagship" Scholars Programme "supports students aged 8-18 to develop the knowledge, skills, and confidence to progress to the most competitive universities by giving them the opportunity to learn beyond the curriculum and experience university-style learning". The programme trains PhD tutors to share their subject knowledge and passion for learning with small groups of students. According to The Brilliant Club, at the end of the programme, students celebrate at a graduation event held at a competitive university.

The charity ran The Brilliant Tutoring Programme from 2020-2023, as part of the government’s National Tutoring Programme, which was designed to support students whose learning was disrupted by COVID-19 school closures.

The Brilliant Club also runs a programme called Parent Power, which creates networks of parent communities across the UK, each one facilitated by The Brilliant Club and an anchor higher education institution. According to The Brilliant Club, parents "receive community organising training so they are empowered to make change in their children’s future and ensure they have a fair chance at success in education and beyond". Currently, there are Parent Power groups running in Barnsley, Birmingham, Bradford, Bristol, Cardiff, East Ayrshire, East London, Fenland, Knowsley, Newport, Oldham, Peterborough, Springburn, Swindon and Wythenshawe. In The Guardian, previous Brilliant Club CEO Anne-Marie Canning MBE described her ambition for The Brilliant Club to "have a network of grass-roots working-class ambassadors" across the country.

In 2022, The Brilliant Club launched a programme called Join the Dots. This programme supports students who are most likely to face barriers in the transition to higher education through a programme of one to one and peer support, co-created by schools and universities.

In 2023, the charity piloted an attainment raising programme, Make Your Mark, in partnership with the University of Sussex, which supports Year 10 students and teachers through tutoring and CPD training.

== Sector activity ==
The Brilliant Club is a member of the Fair Education Alliance, a coalition of more than 300 organisations with the shared mission of tackling educational inequality. The charity also has links with King's College London and Citizens UK, who developed a community organising model for parental engagement on which their Parent Power chapters are based.

Previous CEO Anne-Marie Canning contributed to higher education publication Wonkhe on her own journey in accessing higher education, as well as on other sector related subjects including widening participation and the cost of living crisis for school children.

== Recognition and awards ==
In 2011, The Brilliant Club was named the winner of a Teach First Social Innovation Award. In the same year it was one of the top ten Future 100 winners. In 2012, The Brilliant Club was listed among the 50 people and organisations who are "changing Britain for the better" according to Nesta and The Observer. In 2013, the organisation joined Ernst & Young's Accelerate programme. It was used as a case study by Equity Ideas. In December 2015, the charity was named as one of The Guardian's Charity Award winners for 2015. In 2019, The Brilliant Club was awarded second place in The Sunday Times 100 Best Not-For-Profit Organisations to Work For list. It was also named as one of the 75 Best Small Companies in London.

Yearly, The Brilliant Club publishes The Scholar, an academic journal that showcases school students' work from The Scholars Programme.
