= Teach For Australia =

Australian non-profit organization for removing educational inequity in the country

- Teach For Australia
- Founded: 2009
- Founder: Melodie Potts Rosevear OAM
- Type: Nonprofit organisation
- Purpose: Equity in education
- Location: Melbourne, Perth, Darwin
- Region served: Australia
- Key people: Melodie Potts Rosevear - Founder & Chief Executive Officer; Patrick Forth - Board Chair
- Website: teachforaustralia.org

Teach For Australia is a not-for-profit organisation which aims to address educational inequity in Australia. The organisation’s Leadership Development Program recruits "university-educated high achievers" to the classroom as teachers, placing them in eligible partner schools serving low socioeconomic communities for two years. Program participants earn a Masters-level degree in teaching during the two-year program, allowing them to continue to work in school settings following the completion of their placement.

The organisation is substantially funded by the Australian Federal Government, with the Leadership Development Program delivered as part of the High Achieving Teachers Program through the Commonwealth Department of Education, Skills and Employment. Philanthropic and corporate partners and private donors provide additional funding and program support.

In 2020 Teach For Australia was ranked 51st among GradAustralia’s Top 100 Graduate Employers List. In 2019 it was ranked 42nd, while in 2016 it had been ranked 36th. In addition, the organisation was the only education-related employer on the Australian Association of Graduate Employer’s (AAGE) Top 75 Graduate Employers List for 2020, sitting at number 36, a rise from its 41st ranking in 2019 and 46th in 2018.

Teach For Australia is part of the Teach For All network which operates in 60 countries globally.

== History ==
Teach For Australia was founded in 2009 by Melodie Potts Rosevear. The organisation partnered with the University of Melbourne, allowing the first cohort of program participants, known as associates, to begin their Postgraduate Diploma in Teaching through the university in 2010.

In 2009 the Gillard Federal Government announced its support for Teach For Australia through a multi-cohort agreement. The first cohort of 45 associates was placed in schools in Victoria following the completion of their initial training.

Research conducted in 2010 by Australian National University economics professor Andrew Leigh found that students taught by high performing teachers (those in the top decile of all teachers) learn as much in six months as what teachers in the bottom decile accomplish in a full year. This finding reinforced the organisation's founding philosophy.

In 2011 Teach For Australia expanded into the Australian Capital Territory. The organisation’s recruitment focus was on science, technology, engineering and maths (STEM) specialists. This followed an Australian Academy of Science report that revealed that only half of Year 12 students in Australian schools were studying science, compared to nine out of 10 in the early 1990s. To this end, teach For Australia placed 18 STEM specialists as part of the 2011 Cohort, who might otherwise have gone into the private sector.

Following the 2012 release of the Bill and Melinda Gates Foundation’s Report "Asking Students about Teaching Student Perception Surveys and Their Implementation", Teach For Australia implemented student perception surveys to provide student-led data to associates participating in the Leadership Development Program.

Teach For Australia expanded into the Northern Territory in 2012 and Western Australia in 2015.

In 2013 the Australian Government announced a further multi-cohort funding agreement. In the same year, the Organisation for Economic Cooperation and Development’s (OECD) Program for International Student Assessment (PISA) results found that students from low-income households are almost three years behind in school compared with those from high-income households. Also in 2013, cohort 2011 alumni Justin Matthys and Richard Wilson formed Maths Pathway – designing maths programs that have since been delivered across 170 schools. In 2018 Maths Pathway received a $2.1 million seed investment to improve classroom outcomes.

The Australian Government's Department of Education, Employment and Workplace Relations released an independent evaluation of the Teach For Australia program in 2014 that was conducted by the Australian Council for Educational Research. The evaluation found that "TFA attracts exceptional teachers ... and has a big impact on student performance, teacher quality and teacher retention."

From 2015 until 2019, Teach For All associates earned a Master of Teaching degree through a partnership with Deakin University. In 2019 the organisation partnered with Australian Catholic University, allowing associates to earn a Master of Teaching (Secondary – Professional Practice) as part of the program.

In 2015 Teach For Australia alumnus Michael Briggs-Miller became the first program participant to become a principal when he took on the principalship of Warracknabeal Secondary College in Victoria’s Wimmera district. Briggs-Miller cited leadership as a key outcome of the Teach For Australia Leadership Development Program. To further enhance and entrench school leadership as a focal point of its work Teach For Australia partnered with the Sydney Myer Fund and Gandel Philanthropy to create a new program called Teach To Lead, which was aimed at taking school leaders from positions of responsibility to more senior roles within schools.

Also in 2015, the Mitchell Institute published an index of opportunity that tracked educational disadvantage and showed that students from low socioeconomic households were significantly more likely to be behind their advantaged peers. At the same time, teacher unions stepped up their opposition to the program, citing its cost as a factor. In Western Australia the secretary of the State School Teachers Union, Pat Byrne, said that, despite some good points, the model was flawed.

The Federal Government re-affirmed its commitment to Teach For Australia in 2016 through another multi-cohort agreement. Despite the Government’s recommitment, opposition to the program grew following the screening of a three-part documentary on Australian free-to-air network SBS entitled "Testing Teachers in 2017". In a May 2017 opinion piece Keith Heggart, a PhD student, former teacher and school leader and an organiser for the Independent Education Union, wrote that the program was expensive, consumed school resources and operated at too small a scale to be truly effective. Heggart went on to suggest that whole-career support for existing teachers would assist teacher retention and help to attract high quality candidates into teaching. At the same time, the Australian Government released another independent evaluation of the Teach For Australia program conducted by Dandolo, finding that “Teach For Australia is substantially delivering against the Australia Government’s key objective of placing high quality teachers in schools serving low socioeconomic communities to meet specific skill requirements, for as long as possible.” Meanwhile, Teach For Australia placed its first program participants into Tasmania, placing 13 associates at nine partner schools.

In 2018, Teach For Australia commenced delivery of a mentor development program. For the first time, the organisation placed more than half of the year’s cohort of associates into remote and regional schools.

In a 2019 pre-election campaign announcement, the Morrison LNP Government promised an increase of $15 million in funding to Teach For Australia (over and above pre-existing commitments) to enhance school leadership capabilities in regional and remote schools. This resulted in the development of a Future Leaders Program in 2020. The Future Leaders Program was specifically designed for teachers working in regional and remote schools facing educational disadvantage.

In 2020, Teach For Australia founder and chief executive officer Melodie Potts Rosevear was inducted into the Victorian Honour Roll of Women for her work in "driving change and innovation in the Australian education system to tackle educational disadvantage".

By 2020, Teach For Australia had received more than 12,000 applications for its Leadership Development Program, placing 968 Leadership Development Program associates into 256 schools and producing its 90th Teach To Lead program fellow.

In the 2020 New South Wales State budget, Treasurer Dominic Perrottet and Education Minister Sarah Mitchell announced that the NSW Government would provide $400,000 in funding to Teach For Australia to design a new pathway program to encourage mid-career workers to move into teaching.

In 2021, Teach For Australia’s founder and chief executive officer Melodie Potts Rosevear was awarded an Honorary Order of Australia Medal (OAM) in the General Division for services to education, particularly to teacher development.

The NSW Government's Productivity Commission White Paper 2021: Rebooting the economy, published in June 2021, recommended that the Teach For Australia Leadership Development program be implemented in NSW, saying:

The 2020-21 NSW Budget announced funding to co-design a bespoke model for attracting mid-career and high-achieving professionals into teaching, with TFA and the teaching profession. The pilot program will focus on filling critical shortages in STEM subject areas and in regional and rural schools. But the NSW Government should consider funding TFA to pilot its own program alongside the bespoke model the NSW Government is developing. Such a TFA pilot would provide more data about what works best in New South Wales. TFA has a proven model, national recruitment network, and singular experience providing employment-based pathways in Australia.

== Partner organisations ==
Teach For Australia is part of the global Teach For All network operating in 60 countries. Across the network, associates, fellows and alumni work together with their communities and colleagues to become leaders for change in classrooms, schools, neighbourhoods, education systems and countries.
