= Income deprivation affecting children index (UK) =

The income deprivation affecting children index (IDACI) is an index of deprivation used in the United Kingdom.

The index is calculated by the Ministry of Housing, Communities and Local Government and measures in a local area the proportion of children under the age of 16 that live in low income households. The local areas for which the index is calculated are super output areas. It is supplementary to the Indices of Multiple Deprivation and is used for calculation of the contextual value added score, measuring children's educational progress.
