= Oak National Academy =

State educational resource and website in the United Kingdom

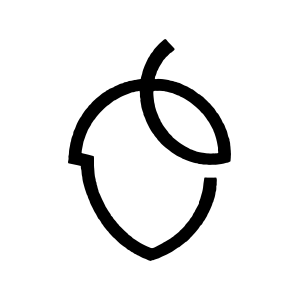

Information
- Type: Independent public body
- Founded: 2020
- Website: www.thenational.academy

Oak National Academy is an educational organisation providing a resource hub and online classroom in the UK. It provides teachers with free lessons and resources for pupils aged from four to 16, from Reception to Year 11.

Oak National Academy was created in response to the 2020 United Kingdom education shutdown during the COVID-19 pandemic. During the shutdown, it offered resources including lesson plans, virtual school assemblies, and a virtual library.

Oak National Academy became an independent public body in 2022 despite protests and a lawsuit by commercial curriculum providers. Different studies have found that between 11% to one-third of UK teachers draw on Oak National Academy in their lesson planning.

== History ==
Oak National Academy is an online classroom and resource hub created in response to the closure of schools during the coronavirus pandemic. It was announced on 19 April 2020, and received the backing of the Department for Education. According to Secretary of State for Education Gavin Williamson, it provided free online lessons and resources to pupils from reception to year 10. It delivered two million lessons in its first week of operation. From April 2020, the TES and Oak National Academy also ran weekly assemblies, with speakers including the Duchess of Cambridge, the Holocaust Educational Trust, and The Archbishop of Canterbury. The latter of these was described by Oak as "the UK's biggest ever school assembly".

In June 2020, the government announced that Oak National Academy would be given £4.3 million funding to provide lessons for pupils for the 2020/21 academic year as a contingency plan for the continuing pandemic. As part of the plan, teachers would be recording lessons over summer 2020 and would be reimbursed for their time. During the school holidays in the COVID lockdown, Oak ran online activity clubs for pupils to take part in. These were provided by organisations like the Scouts, Bite Back 2030 and Jamie's Farm and include activities like cook-a-long, arts and debating clubs. In January 2021, Oak National Academy created a free virtual library for UK schoolchildren affected by the pandemic, offering a selected book each week. A coalition of mobile networks agreed to allow users to visit Oak and BBC Bitesize even if they were out of data, to support at-home learning.

In 2022, the government announced plans to make Oak National Academy an independent public organisation. Leaders of several commercial curriculum agencies wrote to Education Secretary James Cleverly that the plan risked the "collapse of the commercial education resources sector". In September 2022, the plans were finalised, and Matt Hood become interim CEO. Hood had been co-founder and the principal at Oak National Academy, and became the official CEO in 2024. He resigned in 2025. John Roberts was named interim CEO in February 2025.

In November 2023, the British Educational Suppliers Association and the Publishers Association were granted permission to seek judicial review of the decision to make Oak National Academy a semi-autonomous public body, claiming it formed an "unlawful state subsidy". Oak National Academy responded that their curriculum was optional for educators and that they hoped a range of curriculum providers would continue to thrive. The review was put on hold in September 2024.

== Description ==
Example slide deck from an Oak National Academy lesson.

Example worksheet from an Oak National Academy lesson

The material is accessed from a free website, sortable by year group and subject or schedule. Lessons uploaded prior to 1 September 2022 are copyrighted and can only be used for non-commercial educational purposes. Lessons uploaded after that date are released under an Open Government License and can be re-used under the terms of that license, including commercially.

In May 2025, Oak National Academy began recruiting teachers to trial an AI-powered lesson-planning assistant.

== Impact ==
During the 2020 COVID lockdown, Sean Coughlan of BBC News described Oak as a "minor miracle" for the amount of resources it provided. Oak National Academy reported in 2020 that over 4.7m people had visited the website in its first term, with an average of 220,000 users each day. A quarter of the teachers surveyed also explained that their pupils do not have internet at home. Oak National Academy said that, where copyright allowed, it would make resources downloadable with content that could be edited locally for 2020/21.

In 2022, when Oak National Academy became a quango, the government said it would to review the academy's effectiveness within two years. This was delayed for a year by change in government following the 2024 United Kingdom general election. The delay was criticised by the Association of School and College Leaders, which said that it "breeds uncertainty over exactly how Oak National Academy will operate in the future, both in terms of the resources it provides to schools and its impact on the wider commercial market".

Schools Week reported in 2025 that Oak National Academy had become widely used by schools across the UK. Oak National Academy's research found that more than one-third of all teachers used its resources in a 6-month span in 2024. Oak National Academy also stated that based on its survey results, teachers reported an average time-savings of 4 hours a week when using Oak National Academy. A 2025 government survey reported that Oak National Academy was used by 11% of primary school teachers and 13% of secondary school teachers.
