= One Day, All Children =

Book by Wendy Kopp about Teach for America

- Author: Wendy Kopp
- Language: English
- Subject: Education
- Genre: Nonfiction
- Publisher: PublicAffairs
- Publication date: 2001
- Publication place: United States

One Day, All Children: The Unlikely Triumph of Teach For America and What I Learned Along the Way (ISBN 1586481797) is the first book by Wendy Kopp, CEO and Founder of Teach For America. It was published by PublicAffairs in April 2003, thirteen years after the launch of Teach For America. A new edition with a new afterword by the author was issued in early 2011 to coincide with the organization's 20th anniversary. The title is drawn from Teach For America's vision statement: "One day, all children in this nation will have the opportunity to attain an excellent education."

In One Day, All Children, Kopp shares the story of Teach For America, from its beginnings as a one-person startup to a successful large nonprofit organization, with more than 8,000 corps members teaching during the 2010-2011 school year, and a network of over 20,000 alumni.
