= Teach for America =

Nonprofit organization

Teach for America, Inc.
- Formation: 1989; 37 years ago
- Founder: Wendy Kopp
- Type: Nonprofit organization
- Purpose: Eliminate educational inequity
- Headquarters: New York City, US
- Key people: Aneesh Sohoni (CEO)
- Revenue: $276 million (FY 2023)
- Website: teachforamerica.org

Teach for America (TFA) is an American nonprofit organization whose stated mission is to "enlist, develop, and mobilize as many as possible of our nation's most promising future leaders to grow and strengthen the movement for educational excellence."

The organization aims to accomplish this by recruiting and selecting college graduates from top universities around the United States to serve as teachers. The selected members, known as "corps members," commit to teaching for at least two years in a traditional public or public charter K–12 school in one of the 52 low-income communities that the organization serves.

== History ==
TFA was founded by Wendy Kopp based on her 1989 Princeton University undergraduate thesis. Members of the founding team include value investor Whitney Tilson, former commissioner of the Internal Revenue Service Douglas Shulman, and president and CEO of Knowledge Is Power Program (KIPP) Richard Barth.

Since the first corps was established in 1990, more than 42,000 corps members have completed their commitment to Teach for America. In September 2015, the organization reached a milestone of 50,000 corps members and alumni, who have collectively taught more than 5 million students across the nation.

The first 10 years of the organization are chronicled in Kopp's book One Day, All Children: The Unlikely Triumph of Teach for America and What I Learned Along the Way.

In January 2011, Wendy Kopp released her second book, A Chance To Make History, which outlines what she has learned over the last twenty years working in American education.

In April 2025, TFA appointed Aneesh Sohoni as its new chief executive.

== Approach ==
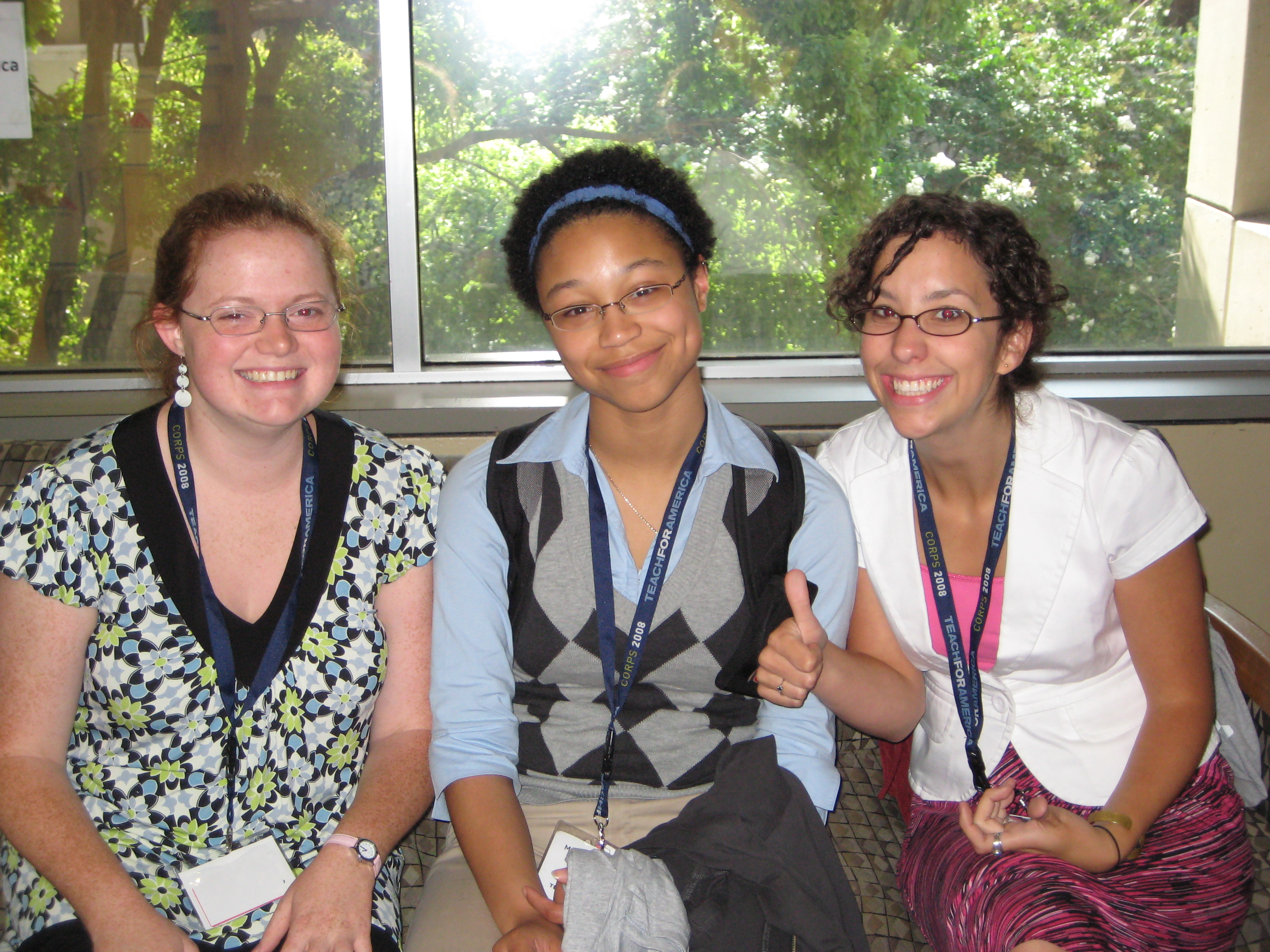
Three Teach for America corps members at the 2008 Houston institute.

Teach for America recruits recent college graduates and professionals to teach for two years in urban and rural communities throughout the United States. The goal of Teach for America is for its corps members to make both a short-term and long-term impact by leading their students to reach their full potential and becoming lifelong leaders for educational excellence. Corps members do not have to be certified teachers, although certified teachers may apply. Uncertified corps members receive alternative certification through coursework taken while completing the program.

All corps members are required to attend an intensive summer training program to prepare for their commitment. Details vary by region, but typically include a five-day regional introduction, a five-to-seven-week residential institute, including teaching summer school, and one to two weeks of regional orientation.

Teach for America teachers are placed in public schools in urban areas such as New York City, Chicago, Detroit, New Orleans, and Houston, as well as in rural places such as eastern North Carolina and the Mississippi Delta. They then serve for two years and are usually placed in schools with other Teach for America corps members.

Teach for America teachers are full-fledged faculty members at their schools, receiving the normal school district salary and benefits as well as a modest AmeriCorps "education voucher" (which can be used to pay for credentialing courses, cover previous student loans or fund further education during or after the two-year commitment). They do not automatically join a union, but are not prohibited from doing so. They may join union strikes even if they are not union members, at the cost of losing pay.

== Retention ==
In 2015, Teach for America reported that 88 percent of its first-year teachers had returned for a second year. The organization also reported that more than 11,000 of its more than 37,000 alumni at the time were still teaching and that further, 65 percent of its alumni were working full-time in the field of education.

Additionally, the organization reported that 84 percent of its alumni were working full-time in roles impacting education or low-income communities. This includes more than 900 school leaders, more than 100 elected union leaders, and 250 school system leaders.

== Geographical reach ==
Teach for America's geographical impact has grown significantly since its foundation. Originally serving only six regions, Teach for America was active in 52 regions as of the 2015–16 school year.

The 52 regions are: Alabama, Appalachia, Arkansas, Baltimore, the Bay Area, Buffalo, Capital Valley (the Sacramento area), Charlotte, Chicago-Northwest Indiana, Colorado, Connecticut, Dallas-Ft. Worth, the D.C. Region, Delaware, Detroit, Eastern North Carolina, the Greater Nashville area, the Greater New Orleans-Louisiana Delta area, the Greater Philadelphia area, Hawai'i, Houston, Idaho, Indianapolis, Jacksonville, Kansas City, the Las Vegas Valley, Los Angeles, Massachusetts, Memphis, the Metro Atlanta area, the Miami-Dade area, Milwaukee, Mississippi, New Jersey, New Mexico, New York City, the North Carolina Piedmont Triad area, Northeast Ohio (the Cleveland area), Oklahoma, Orlando, Phoenix, Rhode Island, the Rio Grande Valley, San Antonio, San Diego, South Carolina, South Dakota, South Louisiana, Southwest Ohio (the Cincinnati area), St. Louis, the Twin Cities, and Washington state.

== Evaluation ==
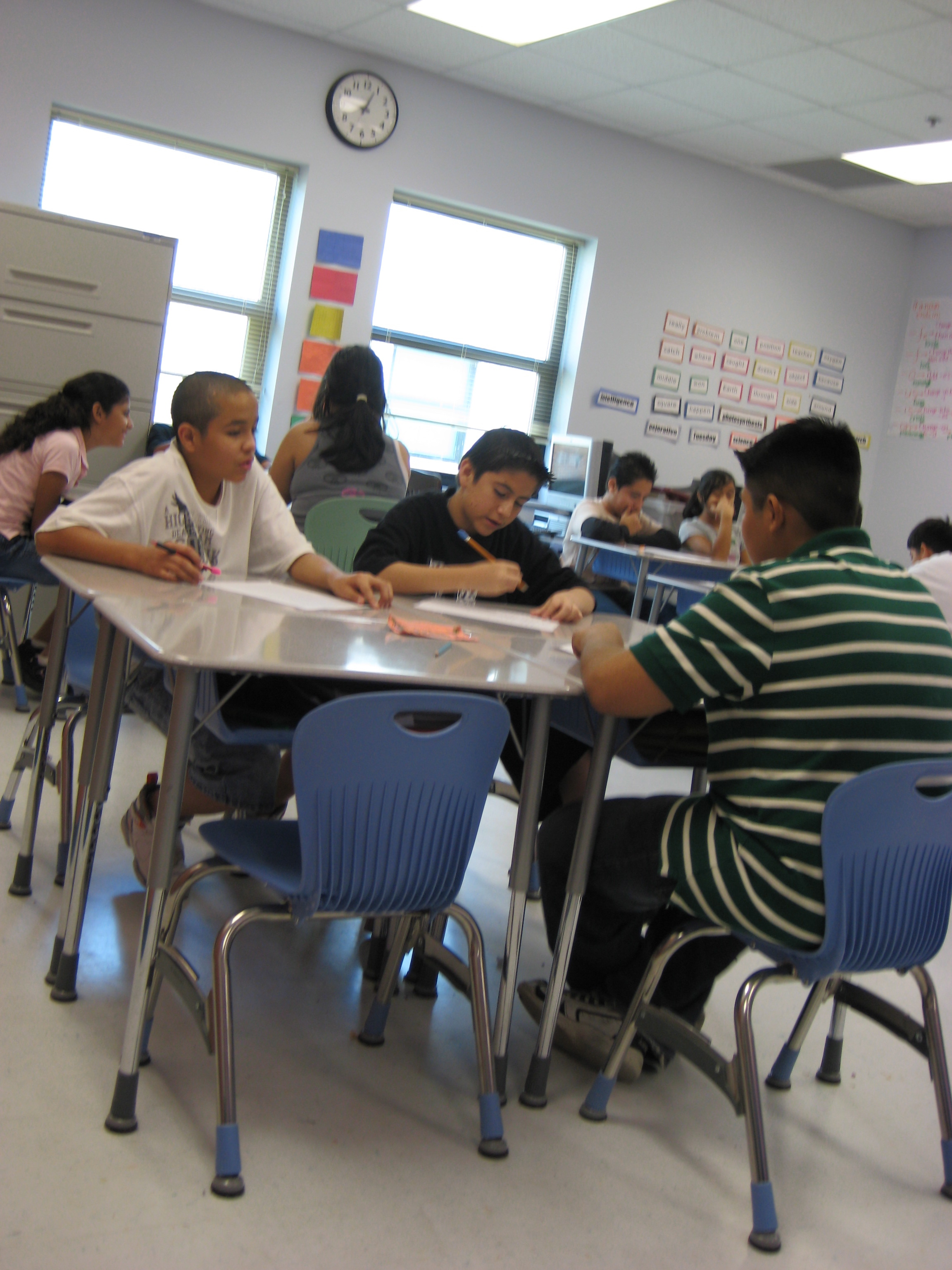
Classroom led by a Teach for America corps member during the 2008 Houston institute

Since the founding of the organization, several independent studies have been conducted to gauge the effectiveness of Teach for America corps members relative to teachers who entered the teaching profession via other channels.

A 2015 Mathematica Policy Research study found that Teach for America teachers produce 1.3 months of extra reading gains in pre-K through second grade classrooms when compared to non-TFA teachers in the same elementary schools. The same study also found that Teach for America teachers across 10 states are as effective as other teachers in math and reading.

A study by the Calder Center and the American Institutes for Research found that Teach for America teachers provide students in Miami with the equivalent of three additional months of math instruction, based on analyses of test scores from state-mandated tests.

The Harvard Strategic Data Project found in 2012 that Teach for America teachers in the Los Angeles Unified School District produce 1-2 extra months of English and math learning outcomes relative to the gains produced by other novice teachers.

Studies in North Carolina and Tennessee suggest that Teach for America is the most effective source of new teachers in the two states, based on student achievement across subjects and grade levels.

In a study by the Urban Institute and the Calder Center in March 2008, published in the Journal of Public Policy and Management, the authors found "TFA teachers tend to have a positive effect on high school student test scores relative to non-TFA teachers, including those who are certified in-field. Such effects exceed the impact of additional years of experience and are particularly strong in math and science."

Another study by Mathematica in 2013 found that students of Teach for America teachers in eight states learn 2.6 more months of secondary math compared with students taught by non-TFA teachers.

A study conducted by Georgia's Department of Audits and Accounts in 2015 found that about 85 percent of the students taught by Teach for America beginning teachers met or exceeded the state's standards compared to 70-74 percent of those in the classes of traditional certified, rookie teachers. Only 77 percent of veteran teachers saw the same achievement in their students. The study countered the long-held belief that the organization's five-week training led to poor student outcomes.

According to an independent study by Policy Studies Associates in 2011, almost 90 percent of principals who work with Teach for America teachers reported high levels of satisfaction with Teach for America and noted that corps members are rated as effective as, and in some cases more effective than, veteran faculty in their schools. Additionally, 87 percent of principals said Teach for America corps members' training is at least as effective as the training of other beginning teachers, and 53 percent found corps members' training to be more effective.

Teach for America won the largest grant of nearly 1,700 applications to the U.S. Department of Education's Investing in Innovation (i3) grant competition in 2010. The 13 scale-up grants required applicants to provide demonstrated evidence of success through objective, methodologically sound studies (e.g., experimental and quasi-experimental research designs) of student achievement.

A 2018 study in the American Political Science Review found that advantaged individuals who teach as part of TFA "adopt beliefs that are closer to those of disadvantaged Americans" as a result of their TFA participation.

== Criticism ==
Teach for America has been criticized by opponents who claim the program replaces experienced teachers with brand-new employees who have had only five weeks of training during the summer, and who are brought in at beginners' salary levels. This criticism applies to the vast majority of new Teach for America teachers, though a small percentage may have some previous experience in education or advanced degrees. Teach for America has responded to critics of its training program by introducing a new program that encourages juniors at undergraduate universities to complete education courses in their senior year before setting foot in the classroom.

Teachers' unions and public school advocates regularly critique the organization, which they see as undermining the professionalization of the education sector by bringing in temporary amateurs to fill positions traditionally reserved for unionized, certified professionals. John Wilson, executive director of the National Education Association, sent a memo in May 2009 stating that union leaders were "beginning to see school systems lay off teachers and then hire Teach for America college grads due to a contract they signed." Wilson went on to say that TFA brings in "the least-prepared and the least-experienced teachers" into low-income schools and makes them "the teacher of record".

USA Today reported that in March 2009, Peter Gorman, superintendent of Charlotte-Mecklenburg, North Carolina schools, told board members that because of a commitment made to the program, 100 Teach for America teachers would be retained in spite of the fact that hundreds of other non-TFA teachers in the district would be laid off. However, TFA spokeswoman Kerci Marcello Stroud replied that it would be a mistaken notion to say that Teach for America corps members are displacing experienced teachers. "In every region where we send teachers, we're just one source," she says. "Once they land, corps members must interview for jobs just like everyone else."

Critics of Teach for America have also cited the results of Mathematica Policy Research's 2004 study as an indication of TFA's lack of efficacy (see Educational Impact). These critics claim that while the study shows that students taught by TFA teachers perform better in mathematics than those taught by non-TFA teachers, the improvement is very small, and that furthermore there is no difference in reading performance between the two groups.

A 2010 article published by Campus Progress suggested that "TFA's breakneck training course leaves TFA teachers—or 'corps members,' as they're called—with insufficient classroom experience, before throwing them headfirst into some of the most disadvantaged school districts in the country."

Deborah Appleman, a professor of Educational Studies at Carleton College, wrote in a 2009 editorial for the Minneapolis Star-Tribune that "[i]mplicit in Teach for America's approach is the insidious assumption that anyone who knows a subject and is willing to be with kids can teach – with little training." She also challenged TFA's "elitist" structure: "The story of TFA becomes a kind of master narrative, a story of heroic and altruistic young people that focuses much more squarely on them than it does on the lives of the children they are committed to serve. There is an elitist overtone to the structure of TFA, a belief that the best and the brightest can make a difference in the lives of children who are less fortunate, even when they are not professionally prepared to do so."

Wendy Kopp said in a Seattle radio appearance in 2001 that outsiders often misunderstand the function of TFA: "We're a leadership development organization, not a teaching organization," she said. "I think if you don't understand that, of course it's easy to tear the whole thing apart." Critics claim this comment shows TFA exists more to advance the careers of its recruits than of the students it claims to help.

Teach for America Counter-Narratives: Alumni Speak Up and Speak Out (Peter Lang, 2015), edited by T. Jameson Brewer and Kathleen deMarrais, was the first official collection of critical alumni voices. Each chapter of the book, written by TFA alumni, sheds light on the organization. With critical narratives covering the entire span of TFA's first 25 years of operations, the chapters are organized into three broad categories: (1) TFA's Recruitment, Training, and Support Structure; (2) TFA's Approach to Diversity; and (3) TFA's Approach to Criticism and Critics.

In February 2019, over 300 TFA alumni signed a letter objecting to the organization putting pressure on young teachers to cross the picket line during the Oakland teachers' strike. Because TFA corps members are often AmeriCorps members, and striking is a prohibited activity for AmeriCorps members, TFA educators risked losing their AmeriCorps award if they went on strike.

== Membership ==
Teach for America had growth in its program until 2013 and has faced declines in the years since.

Year	# of Applicants	# of Incoming Corps Members	# of Regions	Operating Budget
2003	15,708	1,646	20	$29.8M
2004	13,378	1,626	22	$34.0M
2005	17,348	2,181	22	$38.4M
2006	18,968	2,464	25	$55.6M
2007	18,172	2,895	26	$77.9M
2008	24,718	3,614	29	$122.3M
2009	35,178	4,039	35	$149M
2010	46,359	4,485	40	$193M
2011	47,911	5,031	43	$229M
2012	48,442	5,800	47	$294M°
2013	57,266	5,961	48	$239M
2014	50,276	4,500	50	$321M
2015	44,181	4,100	52	$376M
2016	37,000	3,400	53	$328M
2017	49,000	3,559	53	$287M
2018		3,692		$284M
2019		3,110	51	$288M
2020		2,783	50	$289M
2021		2,237		
2022		1,616		
2023		2,200		
2024		2,300		
2025		2,300		

°FY 2013 was a shortened fiscal year as Teach for America shifted to a fiscal year based on the school year. FY 2013 began January 10, 2012, and ended May 31, 2013. Beginning in FY 2014, the fiscal year began June 1 and concluded May 31 of the following year

== Acceptance rate ==
Between 2008 and 2013, acceptance rates hovered around 11-15 percent.

In 2013, the organization received its largest applicant pool to date, with 57,000 people applying to the program. The organization selected approximately 6,000 of the applicants, making its acceptance rate less than 11 percent, the most selective corps in its history.

In recent years, the acceptance rate has been appproximately 25 percent.

== Receipt of philanthropic funds ==
Teach for America lists many of its significant contributors on its website. The list includes foundations, individuals, corporations, and public and investor categories.

Among the biggest donors to the organization are the Walton Family Foundation, which has donated to TFA since 1993. In November 2015 the Walton Family Foundation announced a gift to TFA of $50 million over three years to support recruitment efforts and professional development for 4,000 new teachers across the country.

Arthur and Toni Rembe Rock are listed as Champion Donors on the organization's website, having donated more than $5 million. The organization's annual Social Innovation Award is named in their honor. The Arthur & Toni Rembe Rock Social Innovation Award is open to current TFA corps members and alumni. Winners receive $100,000 to build education-focused social ventures.

In 2011, the Eli and Edythe Broad Foundation was the first philanthropic organization to commit to the endowment fund with a pledge of $25 million and called upon other funders to match this figure. Three additional philanthropic donors—the Laura and John Arnold Foundation, the Robertson Foundation, and Steve Mandel—stepped up and each provided $25 million in matching funds.

== Publications ==
=== Teaching as Leadership ===
Teaching as Leadership cover

Teaching as Leadership: The Highly Effective Teacher's Guide to Closing the Achievement Gap (ISBN 0470432861) is a book by Steven Farr, Chief Knowledge Officer at Teach for America, published by Jossey Bass in 2010. The book outlines six principles that Farr believes will help teachers become leaders within the classroom, in particular, classrooms in low-income communities.

In Childhood Education, Joey Estes says "This book, while focusing on low-income, high-need schools and classrooms, offers a unique and candid look at the people who are successfully making a huge difference in the lives of under-served students every day."

== Alumni ==
Notable Teach for America alumni include:

- Sohrab Ahmari, Iranian-born American journalist
- Gregg Costa (Mississippi Delta '94), United States Circuit Judge for the United States Court of Appeals for the Fifth Circuit
- Mike Feinberg (Houston '92), KIPP Co-founder
- Bill Ferguson (Baltimore '05), Maryland state senator
- Smokey Fontaine (Baltimore '93), an American writer, music critic and editor
- James Foley (Phoenix '96), photojournalist murdered while a prisoner of Isis in Syria in 2014
- Nicholas Gilson (Nashville '11), Founder and CEO of Gilson Snow
- Peter Hermann (New York '90), American actor and husband of Mariska Hargitay
- Chrissy Houlahan (Philadelphia), United States House Representative from Pennsylvania
- Kevin Huffman (Houston '92), Tennessee State Education Commissioner from April 2011 to January 2015
- Mike Johnston (Mississippi Delta '97), Colorado state senator and 46th Mayor of Denver, Colorado
- Daniel J. Jones (Baltimore '98), former US Senate investigator, portrayed in The Report (2019 film)
- Jason Kamras (Washington, D.C. '96), 2005 National Teacher of the Year
- Kevin Kiley (Los Angeles), United States House Representative from California
- Ezra Koenig, Lead singer of indie rock band Vampire Weekend
- Mark D. Levine (New York City '91), New York City Councilmember
- Seth Magaziner, Representative from Rhode Island in Congress from 2023 through present
- DeRay Mckesson (New York City '07), Black Lives Matter Movement activist and candidate in the 2016 Baltimore mayoral election
- Tim Morehouse (New York '00), Silver Medal winner in the men's saber as a member of the United States fencing team at the 2008 Summer Olympics
- Brittany Packnett (New York City '07), Black Lives Matter Movement activist and co-founder of Campaign Zero
- Michelle Rhee (Baltimore '92), Former Chancellor of District of Columbia Public Schools and founder of The New Teacher Project and StudentsFirst
- Alec Ross (Baltimore '94), Senior Adviser for Innovation for Secretary of State Hillary Clinton
- Tony Vargas (New York '07), Nebraska State Senator, 2018 Presidential Leadership Scholars, and 2017 Ten Outstanding Young Americans
- Zeke Vanderhoek (New York City '98), Founder and Chairman, Manhattan GMAT; Founder and Principal, The Equity Project
- Caroline Van Zile (New York '06), 3rd solicitor general of Washington, D.C.
- John C. White (2010), Louisiana state superintendent of education since 2012

== See also ==
- Academy for Urban School Leadership
- Alternative teaching certification
- Citizen Schools
- City Year
- Mississippi Teacher Corps
- New Leaders
- Noored Kooli
- NYC Teaching Fellows
- Peace Corps
- Teach First
- Teach First Deutschland
- Teach For All
- Teach For Us
- Teach For Armenia
- Venture for America
