= Teach For All =

Global network which sends teachers to low-income schools

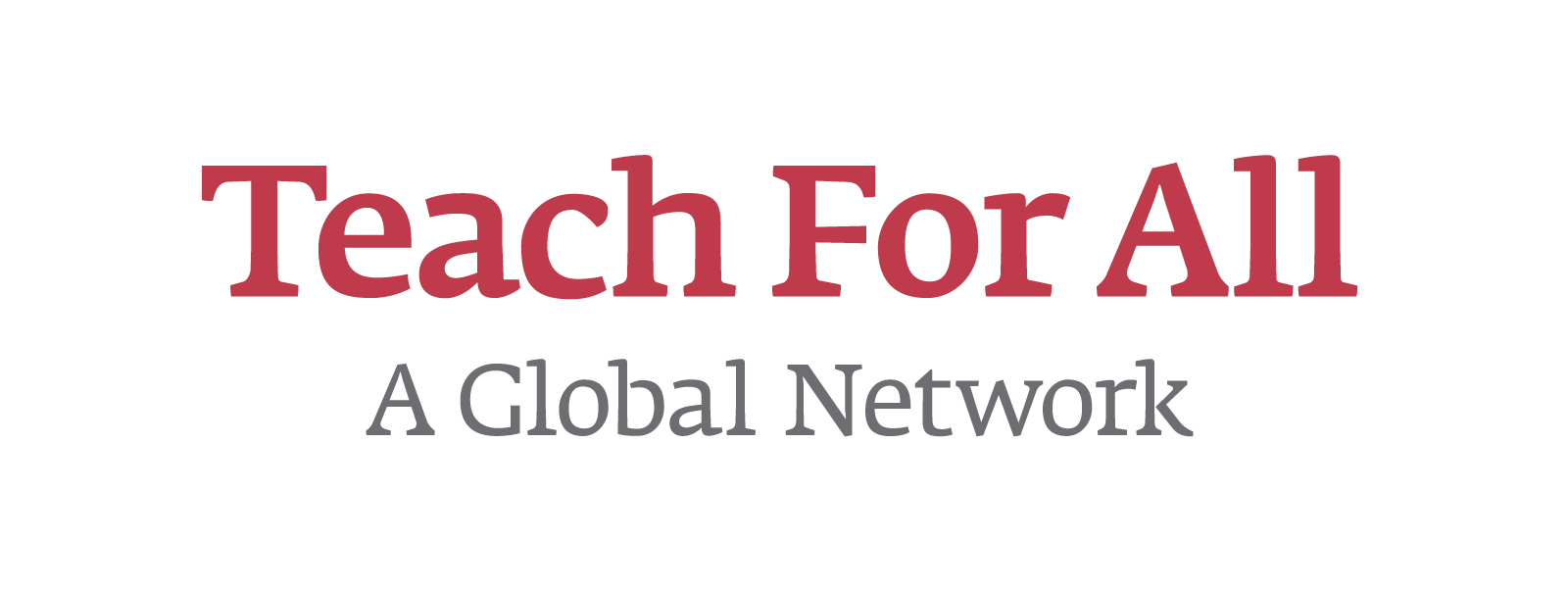
- Founded: 2007
- Founder: Wendy Kopp, and Brett Wigdortz, Co-founders
- Type: Nonprofit organization
- Purpose: Eliminate Educational Inequity
- Location: New York, Washington, D.C., London, Doha, Hong Kong
- Key people: Wendy Kopp - Co-founder & Chief Executive Officer; Brett Wigdortz - Co-founder
- Website: teachforall.org

Teach For All is a global network of more than 60 independent, locally led and funded partner organizations whose stated shared mission is to "expand educational opportunity around the world by increasing and accelerating the impact of social enterprises that are cultivating the leadership necessary for change." Each partner aims to recruit and develop diverse graduates and professionals to exert leadership through two-year commitments to teach in their nations' high-need classrooms and lifelong commitments to expand opportunity for children. The organization was founded in 2007 by Wendy Kopp (founder and former CEO of Teach For America) and Brett Wigdortz (founder and former CEO of Teach First). Teach For All works to accelerate partners' progress and increase their impact by capturing and sharing knowledge, facilitating network connections, provisioning global resources, and fostering leadership development of staff, teachers, and alumni.

== History ==
Teach For America founder Wendy Kopp and Teach First founder Brett Wigdortz co-founded Teach For All after fielding numerous requests from social entrepreneurs around the world who wanted to create similar organizations that would expand educational opportunities in their own countries. Since its launch at the Clinton Global Initiative in September 2007, Teach For All has grown to include 63 partners on six continents as of June 2026 who are pursuing a similar approach to working towards educational equity and excellence for all of their nations' children. The organization has global hubs in New York, Washington, London, Doha, Pune, and Hong Kong. It has an annual budget of $19.9 million provided by global foundations, corporations, and individuals.

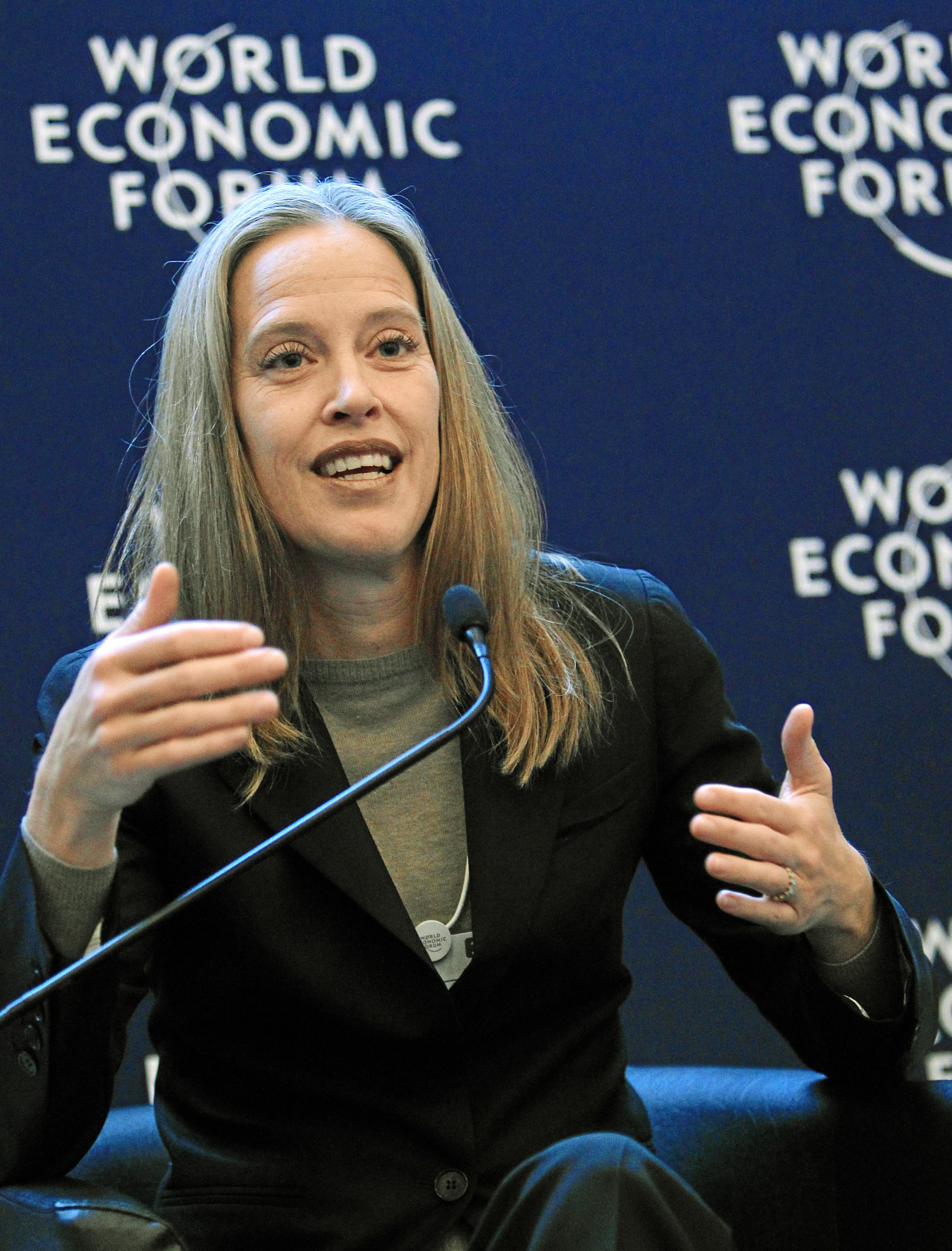
Wendy Kopp, Founder of Teach for America, co-founder of Teach For All

== Organization structure ==
Teach For All is a network of organizations with a mission to expand educational opportunity. Teach For All partner organizations work to improve the education of students in classrooms now, while simultaneously working to build the long-term movement for educational equity in their countries. In order to achieve this, Teach For All partner organizations recruit graduates and professionals from a range of academic disciplines to commit two years to teach in high-need schools and communities and to work throughout their lives to ensure more students are able to fulfill their potential. Teach For All network partners provide participants with ongoing training and support throughout their initial two-year commitments, and foster the development of alumni as leaders for educational change.

In a 2017 lecture at Princeton University reported in the Daily Princetonian, Teach For All co-founder Wendy Kopp said, "In actuality, the organization’s primary aim is to find solutions for 'the big, complex, systemic challenges that can’t be solved in classrooms alone'."

Teach For All is based on the concept of global-local practice-partners which launch grassroots organizations in their countries and belong to a global network of organizations. It is described by Thomas Friedman as "a loose global network of locally run teams of teachers, who share best practices and target young people in support of a single goal." The Teach For All approach is demand driven; in almost all cases, the organization is approached by already established efforts interested in joining the network, rather than proactively spreading the approach.

The organization cites diverse cultural contexts across its different network partners as one of its major strengths, allowing partner organizations to make an impact within their own spheres of influence and socio-political structures.

Teach For All forms partnerships with organizations that share the same theory of change and are committed to ten unifying principles, quoted here:

1. Pursue our global network's shared purpose and theory of change rooted in our theory of the problem, live into our core values when working across the network, and contribute to our unifying vision and intended outcomes.

2. Recruit and select a significant number of the country's most promising leaders from diverse backgrounds, academic disciplines, and career interests, who demonstrate the values and capabilities to positively impact holistic outcomes of students in marginalized communities and become lifelong leaders who work with others to achieve systemic change

3. Partner with schools and communities to contribute to collective leadership among students, educators,and community members, initially with participants who make a two-year commitment to teach, with full responsibility for student learning, and ultimately with alumni who continue working to expand opportunity for children

4. Support and develop participants as leaders who work with students, families, and community members towards a shared vision for student success and gain the foundations for a lifetime of contribution to children fulfilling their potential

5. Cultivate lifelong leadership among alumni so they can work collectively with students, families, and other stakeholders to enable all children to fulfill their potential.

6. Pursue measurable impact on holistic student outcomes at the classroom and community levels.

7. Operate an autonomous organization with an independent board and a diversified funding base.

8. Partner with the public and private sectors at every level to achieve shared goals and sustain local and national impact.

9. Build a diverse coalition of leaders including team members, participants, alumni, students and supporters, with a commitment to the representation and inclusion of those who have experienced the inequities we’re addressing.

10. Uphold the inherent dignity and worth of all people, within and across borders, through all aspects of the organization’s work.

== Partners ==
Teach For All currently has more than 60 partner organizations around the world. Within this network, Teach For All partners have placed over 65,000 teachers and impacted more than 6,000,000 children. In recent years, Teach For All partners support over 16,000 teachers impacting over 1,150,000 children annually. There have been inquiries about joining the Teach For All network from social entrepreneurs in a number of additional countries.

Table of Member Organizations
Organization Name	Country	Year founded
Teach For Afghanistan	Afghanistan	2017
Enseñá por Argentina	Argentina	2009
Teach For Armenia	Armenia	2013
Teach For Australia	Australia	2009
Teach For Austria	Austria	2011
Teach For Bangladesh	Bangladesh	2012
Teach For Belgium	Belgium	2013
Enseña por Bolivia	Bolivia	2020
Ensina Brasil	Brazil	2016
Teach For Bulgaria	Bulgaria	2010
Teach For Cambodia	Cambodia	2017
Enseña Chile	Chile	2007
Teach For China	China	2010
Enseña por Colombia	Colombia	2010
Teach First Danmark	Denmark	2015
Enseña Ecuador	Ecuador	2013
Noored Kooli (Youth to School)	Estonia	2006
Teach For Ethiopia	Ethiopia	2021
Le Choix de l'école	France	2015
Teach First Deutschland	Germany	2008
Anseye Pou Ayiti	Haiti	2015
Teach For India	India	2007
Teach For Italy	Italy	2019
Teach For Japan	Japan	2012
Teach For Qazaqstan	Kazakhstan	2023
Teach For Kenya	Kenya	2020
Teach For Kyrgyzstan	Kyrgyzstan	2024
Iespējamā Misija (Mission Possible)	Latvia	2008
Teach For Lebanon	Lebanon	2008
Teach For Liberia	Liberia	2019
Renkuosi Mokyti! (Let's Teach!)	Lithuania	2012
Teach For Malaysia	Malaysia	2011
Enseña por Méxìco	Méxìco	2013
Teach for Mongolia	Mongolia	2022
Teach For Morocco	Morocco	2019
Teach For Nepal	Nepal	2012
Ako Mātātupu: Teach First NZ	New Zealand	2012
Teach For Niger	Niger	2025
Teach For Nigeria	Nigeria	2017
Teach For Pakistan	Pakistan	2018
Teach For Palestine	Palestine	2023
Enseña por Panamá	Panama	2015
Enseña por Paraguay	Paraguay	2019
Enseña Perú	Peru	2010
Teach for the Philippines	The Philippines	2012
Teach For Poland	Poland	2020
Teach For Portugal	Portugal	2019
Teach For Qatar	Qatar	2013
Teach For Romania	Romania	2014
Teach For Senegal	Senegal	2021
Teach For Sierra Leone	Sierra Leone	2020
Teach (Teach For Slovakia)	Slovakia	2014
Empieza por Educar	Spain	2011
Teach For Sweden	Sweden	2013
Teach For Thailand	Thailand	2013
Teach For Uganda	Uganda	2017
Teach For Ukraine	Ukraine	2017
Teach First	United Kingdom	2001
Teach For America	United States	1990
Enseña Uruguay	Uruguay	2014
Teach For Uzbekistan	Uzbekistan	2024
Teach For Viet Nam	Vietnam	2017
Teach for Zimbabwe	Zimbabwe	2020
Teach First Indonesia	Indonesia	2026

== Requirements ==
The Teach For All theory of change is based on developing "leaders in any sector who have seen the battlefield [of educating in under-served communities and] will become powerful allies in the quest to improve the worst schools." Approximately 50-70 percent of Teach For All partners' alumni stay in education long-term. Some alumni continue to work toward improving education systems and outcomes in other ways, such as by developing online teaching resources. Upon joining the network, each local organization is responsible for its governance and funding and is encouraged to develop a distinct brand and logo.

== Impact & Initiatives ==
=== Novice Educator Support and Training ===
In February 2021 Teach For All announced the commencement of a three-year policy experimentation partnership with the European Commission. Co-funded through a European Union Erasmus+ Key Action 3 grant, The Novice Educator Support and Training (NEST) partnership focuses on mentoring for new teachers in under-resourced schools. NEST is intended to design, implement, and evaluate a system of adaptive mentoring for new teachers in under-resourced schools in Bulgaria, Austria, Belgium, Spain, and Romania. Teach For Bulgaria leads the consortium, with other Teach For All partners working alongside Ministries of Education, other public authorities, a teacher union, and a university. The NEST initiative draws on the experience of the previous Erasmus+ A New Way for New Talents in Teaching (NEWTT) project also led by Teach For Bulgaria.
