= Whittier School =

Whittier School or John Greenleaf Whittier School may refer to:

(by state)

- John G. Whittier School (Phoenix, Arizona), listed on the NRHP in Arizona
- Whittier School, an elementary school in the Long Beach Unified School District, CA
- Whittier State School, former reform school in Whittier, California
- Whittier High School in Whittier, California
- Whittier School, an elementary school in the Chicago school district
- John Greenleaf Whittier School, No. 33, Indianapolis, Indiana, NRHP-listed
- Whittier School (Waterloo, Iowa), NRHP-listed
- John Greenleaf Whittier School (Philadelphia, Pennsylvania), Philadelphia, Pennsylvania, NRHP-listed
- Whittier School (Mitchell, South Dakota), NRHP-listed
- Whittier School (Logan, Utah), NRHP-listed
- Whittier Education Campus, in Washington, DC

== See also ==
- Whittier Elementary School (disambiguation)
- John Greenleaf Whittier
- John Greenleaf Whittier House, Amesbury, MA, listed on the NRHP in Massachusetts
