= Park View (Washington, D.C.) =

Neighborhood of Washington, D.C.

Coordinates: 38.9348°N 77.0212°W

- Neighborhood of Washington, D.C.
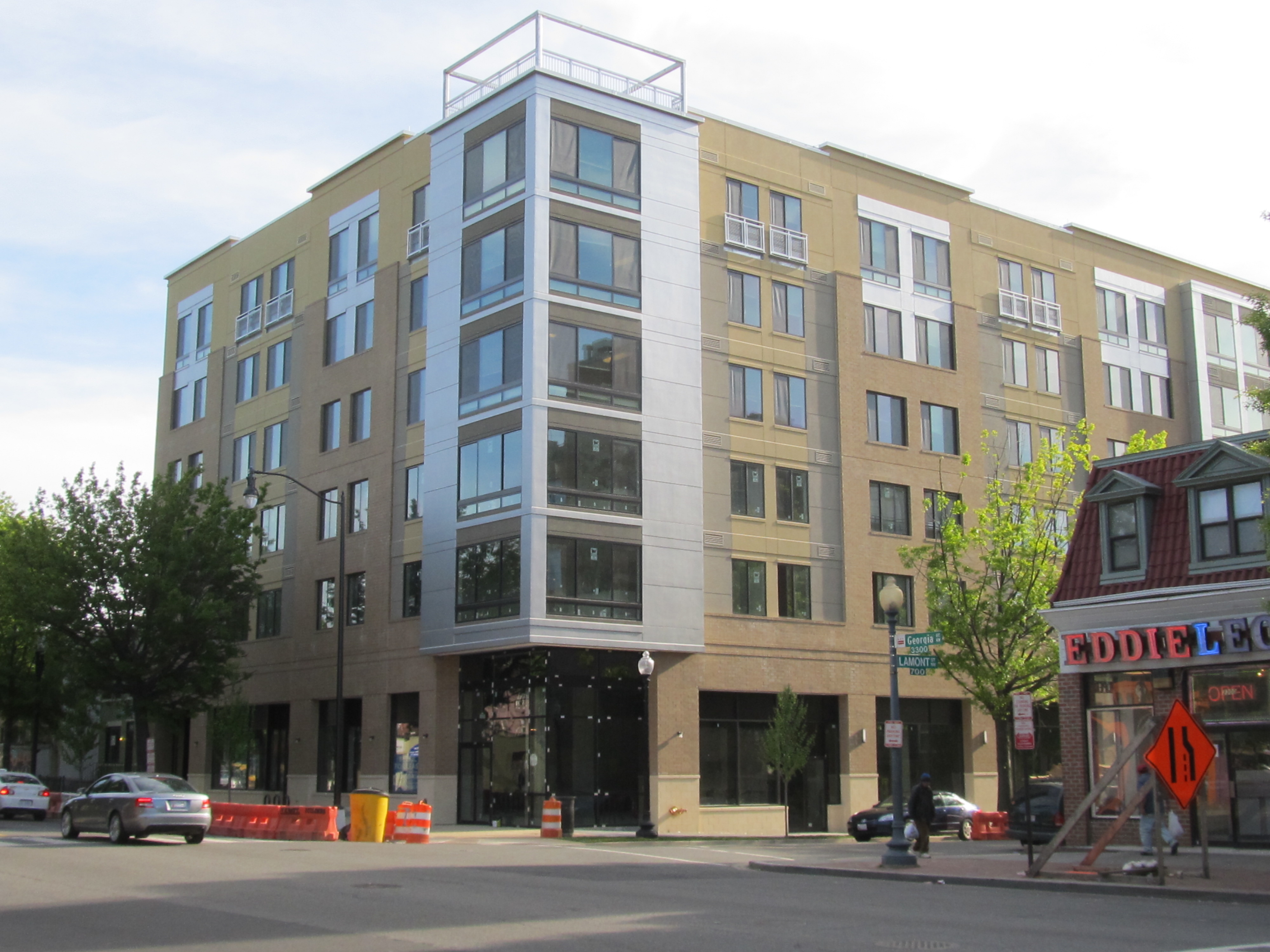
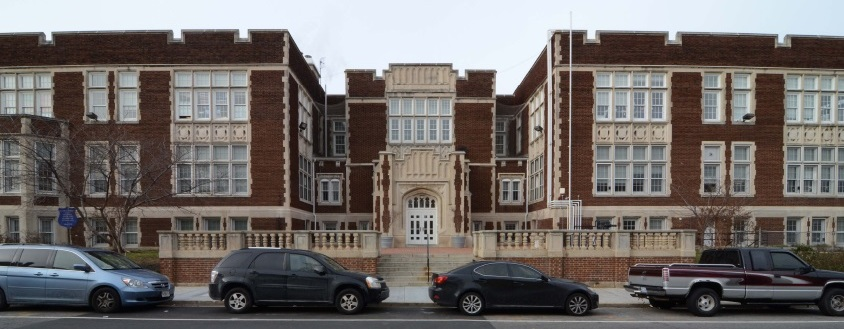
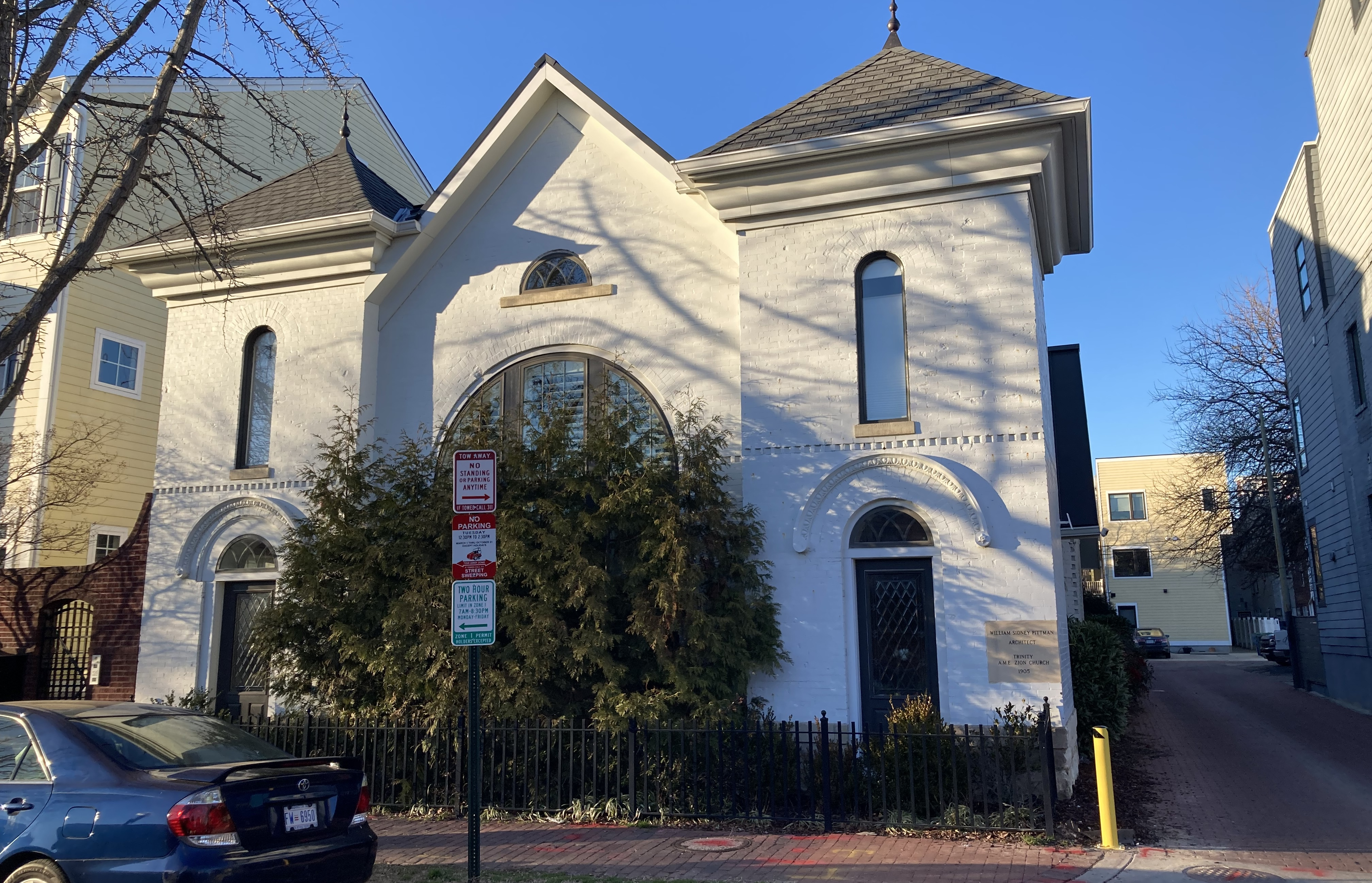
- Top: Georgia Avenue; middle: Park View School; bottom: Morton Street (left) and Park Road (right).

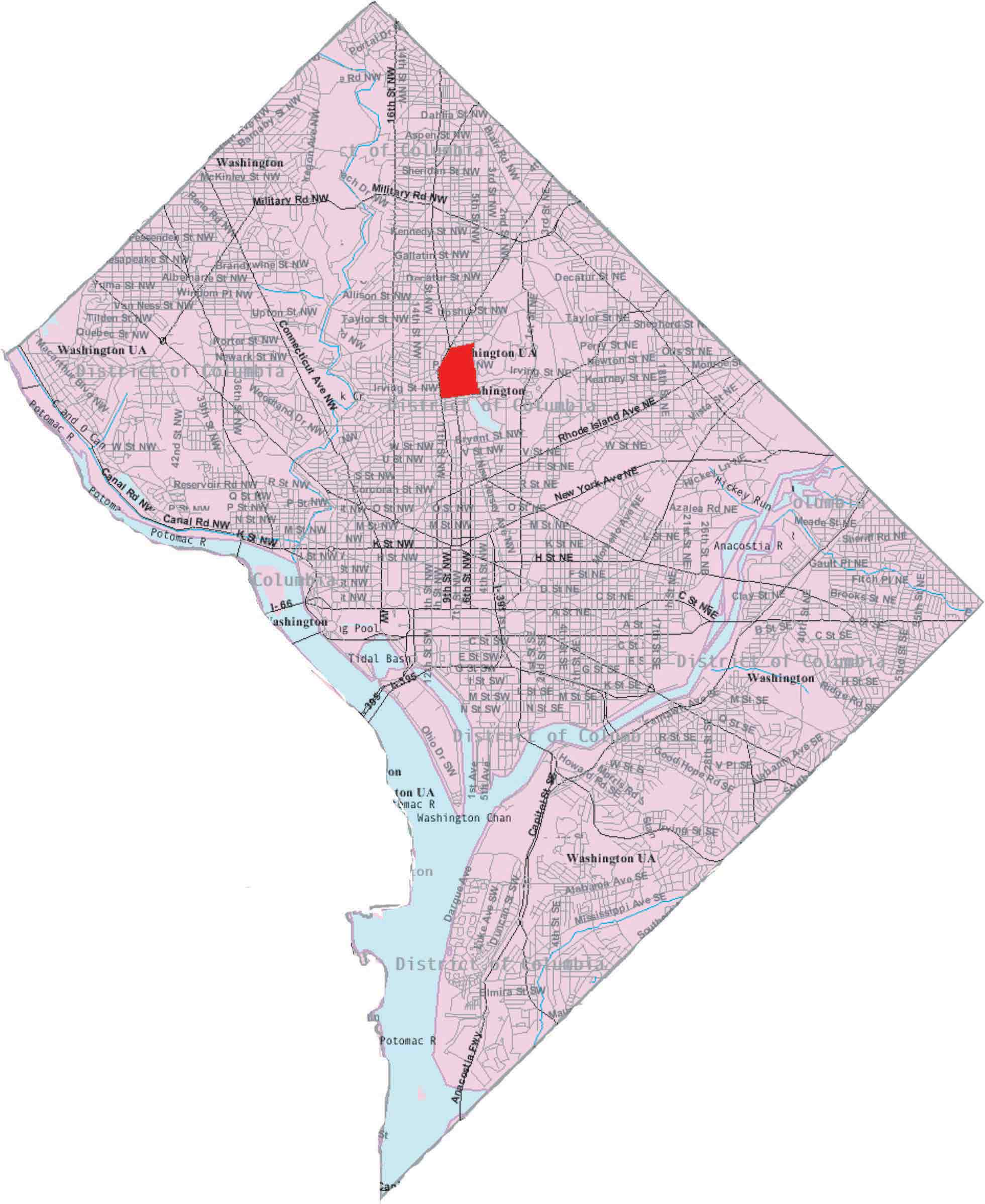
- Map of Washington, D.C., with Park View highlighted in red
- Country: United States
- District: Washington, D.C.
- Quadrant: Northwest
- Ward: 1

Government
  - Councilmember: Brianne Nadeau

Area
  - Land: 0.25 sq mi (0.65 km^{2})

Population (2020)
  - Total: 5,099
  - Density: 20,396/sq mi (7,875/km^{2})
- Postal code: ZIP code

Park View is a neighborhood in Washington, D.C., located in Northwest D.C. The neighborhood is primarily residential with its main commercial corridor of shops and restauarants located along Georgia Avenue. It is bordered to the west by Columbia Heights, the north by Petworth, and the south by McMillan Reservoir and Pleasant Plains.

Park View was developed at the turn of the 19th and 20th centuries, along the western boundary of the U.S. Soldiers' Home. The name of the neighborhood is derived from its relation to the park-like setting of the Soldier's Home, which was formerly open to the public as a park into the 1960s.

== Geography ==
Park View is situated in the Northwest quadrant of the city. The territory that defines the Park View neighborhood extends from Gresham Place north to Rock Creek Church Road, and from Georgia Avenue to the Soldiers' Home grounds. The additional area bounded by Park Road, New Hampshire Avenue, and Georgia Avenue completes the neighborhood's boundaries. The southern border of the Park View Citizens' Association was Columbia Road. Sherman Avenue is considered by some to be the western boundary of the neighborhood.

== Demographics ==
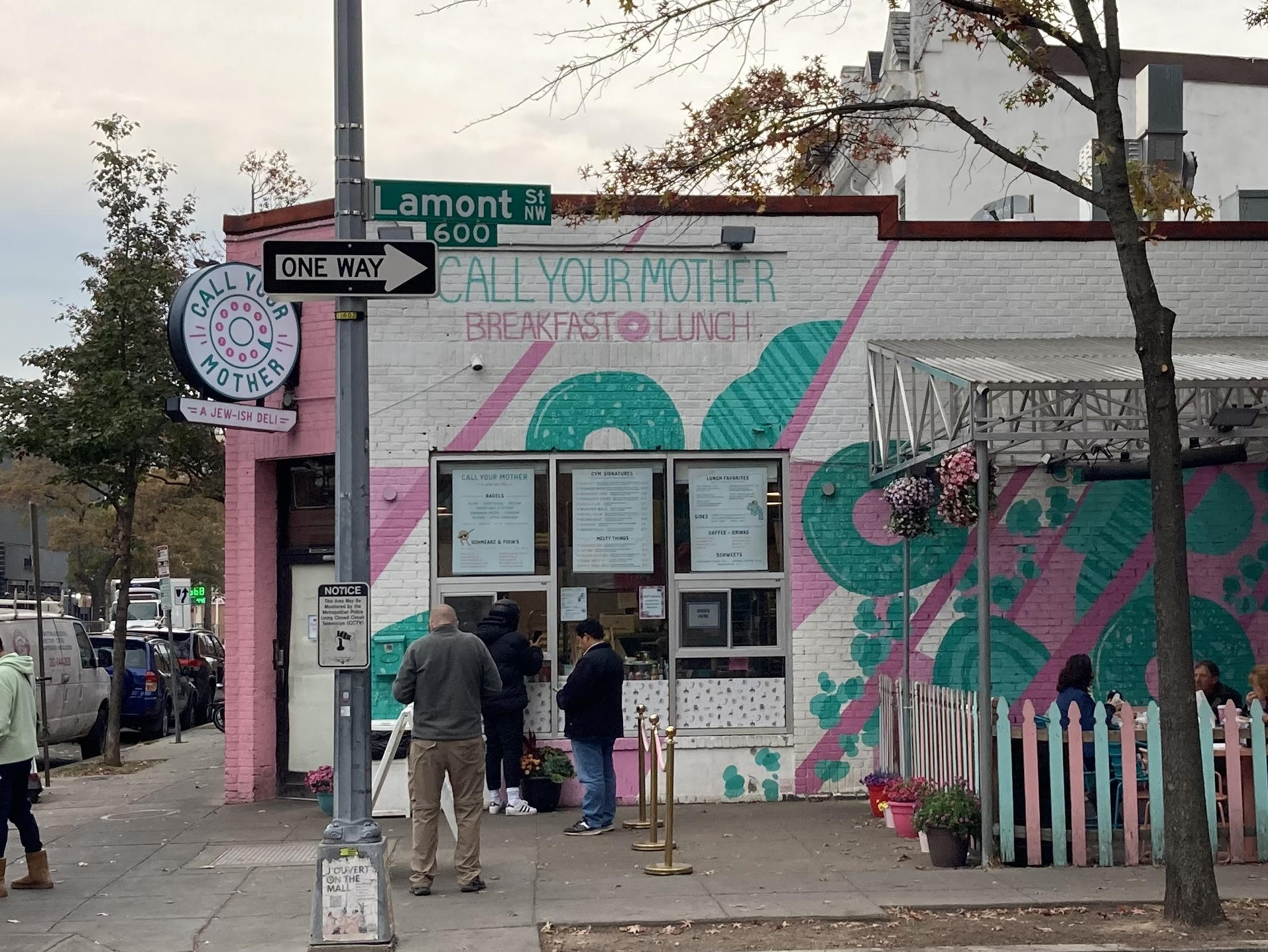
The original Call Your Mother location, established in 2018.

Tract 32 Census Results
Census	Pop.	Note	%±
1930	7,087		—
1940	7,859		10.9%
1950	8,367		6.5%
1960	6,608		−21.0%
1970	6,389		−3.3%
1980	5,285		−17.3%
1990	4,861		−8.0%
2000	4,480		−7.8%
2010	4,913		9.7%
2020	5,099		3.8%

The majority of Park View falls within Tract 32 of the 188 Census Tracts in the District of Columbia, which counted 5,099 residents in 2020 vs. 4,913 in 2010, an increase of 3.8%. Previous to there was a 9.7% increase in population from 2000 to 2010.

Ethnically and racially, the area has become less Black and more White and multi-racial from 2010 to 2020. In 2020 there were 35% fewer non-Hispanic Blacks than in 2010, dropping from 2,836 to 1,834 and they formed the plurality of residents, but no longer the majority. The Non-Hispanic White population increased 118% from 723 to 1,576 and they became the second-largest group, taking that position from Hispanics and Latinos. The neighborhood's population was in 2020 was 36.0% non-Hispanic (NH) Black (vs. 57.7% in 2010), 30.9% NH White (up from 14.7% in 2010), 23.5% Hispanic or Latino (vs. 24.2% in 2010), 4.1% NH Asian vs. 1.9% in 2010; 0.08% NH American Indian and Alaska Native vs. 0.28% in 2010; 1.0% NH some other race vs. 0.2% in 2010, and 4.5% NH multiracial vs. 1.0% who identified as such in 2010.

According to the Census Bureau's American Community Survey (2005–09), the average family income was $70,231. This was up 22% from the 2000 census numbers. The same survey reported the unemployment rate in Park View to be 9.6%. Employment for residents 16 years of age or older was 63% at that time.

== Political representation ==
Politically, Park View is in D.C.'s Ward 1 and falls within Advisory Neighborhood Commission 1A (ANC1A). Three ANC1A Single Member Districts represent the neighborhood. ANC 1A08 represents the northern section, central Park View is represented by ANC 1A09, and ANC 1A10 serves the southern third of the neighborhood.

== History ==
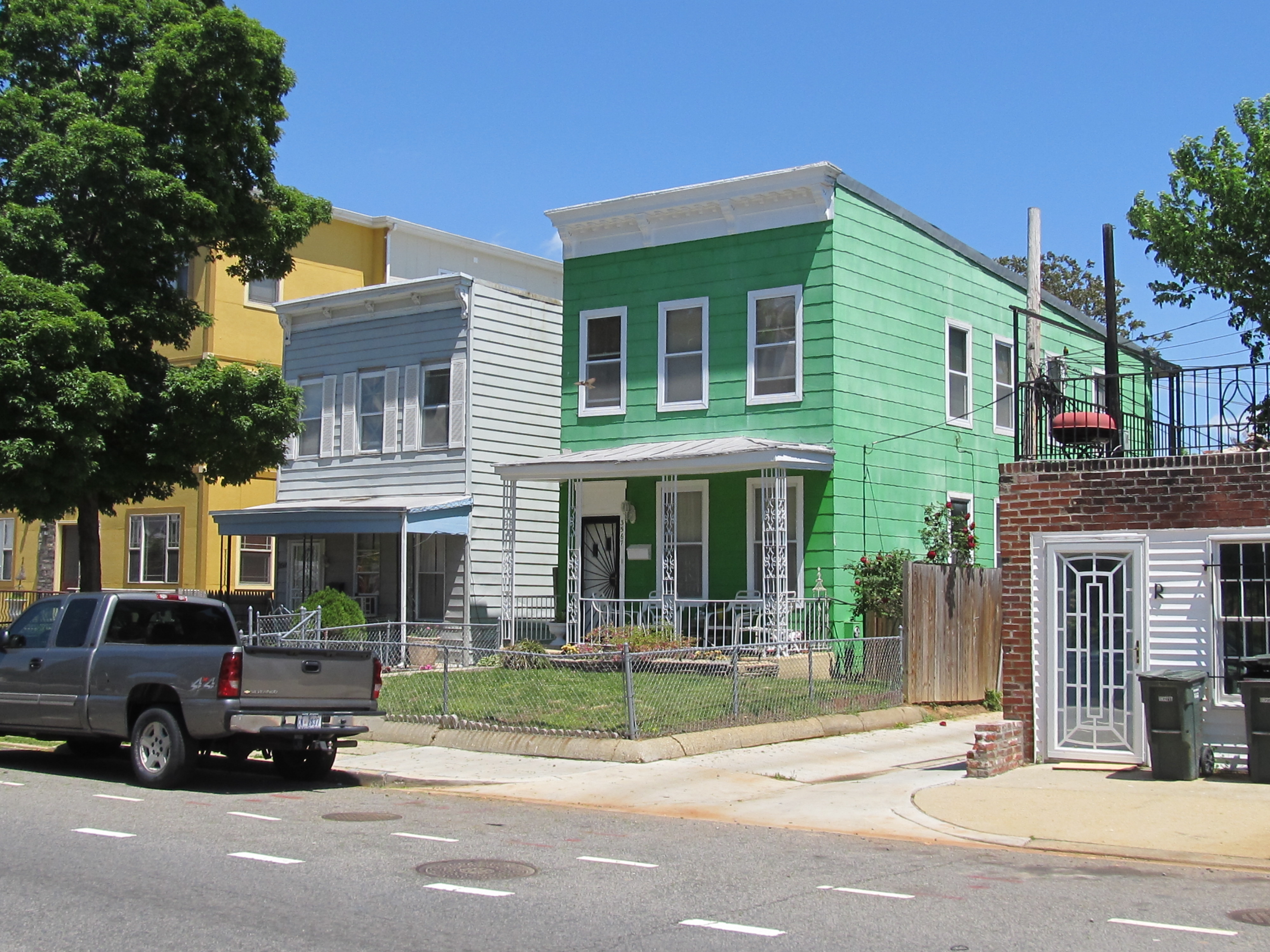
3567 and 3569 Warder Street, NW. These two houses date to 1893 and are the sole remaining houses from the Whitney Close subdivision.

The transition of the rural community to the west of the Soldiers' Home into Washington's Park View neighborhood dates to June 4, 1886. On that date, the heirs of Catherine M. Whitney sold the former estate of Asa Whitney, known as Whitney Close, to Benjamin H. Warder of Ohio for the sum of $60,024. Warder immediately set about subdividing the 43-acre tract of land into building lots for a new community. This was followed by the subdivision and development of other country properties in the area. These subdivisions—including Whitney Close, Schuetzen Park, and Bellevue—were organized into a single neighborhood known as Park View in 1908. Park View eventually included the subdivision of Princeton Heights to the north to round out the neighborhood boundaries. Since the neighborhood abutted the grounds of the Soldiers' Home, and as the grounds were open to the public as a courtesy, the name Park View was chosen to signify the close relationship between these two communities.

The Soldiers' Home Grounds were important in the early life of Park View. The Soldiers' Home granted permission to the neighborhood to hold their Fourth of July celebrations there in 1917 and 1918. Neighborhood children would play on the grounds and sail toy boats on the ponds. Picnics and long walks were also frequent pastimes, with the view of the city and the Capitol being unparalleled.

Reflecting the social changes occurring in the entire city of Washington, Park View desegregated at the end of the 1940s. Black families began to move into the northern part of the neighborhood around 1946. Eventually, the neighborhood became a solidly African American community and remained this way for a period of over 30 years. Following the Georgia Avenue-Petworth Metro Station opening in 1999 the neighborhood began to change yet again and today can be considered truly multicultural.

The relationship between the neighborhood and the Soldiers' Home began to change during the early 1950s. In response to losing part of its property to the south for the Washington Hospital Center, the Soldiers' home began closing its southern gates from 1953 to 1955. Eventually, its grounds were officially closed to residents of the neighborhoods entirely in November 1968, thus depriving the community of the only real green space it had ever known.

=== Georgia Avenue ===
Georgia Avenue is the commercial artery of Park View. It was built in 1810 which makes it one of Washington's oldest thoroughfares connecting the city of Washington with nearby communities. It was originally known as the 7th Street Turnpike and connected Washington with Rockville, Md., leaving the city from its northern boundary where 7th Street crosses today's Florida Avenue. It was renamed Georgia Avenue in 1908 after Georgia Senator Augustus Octavius Bacon pushed an amendment through Congress for that purpose.

=== Architectural and cultural sites of interest ===
==== Tenth Precinct Station House ====
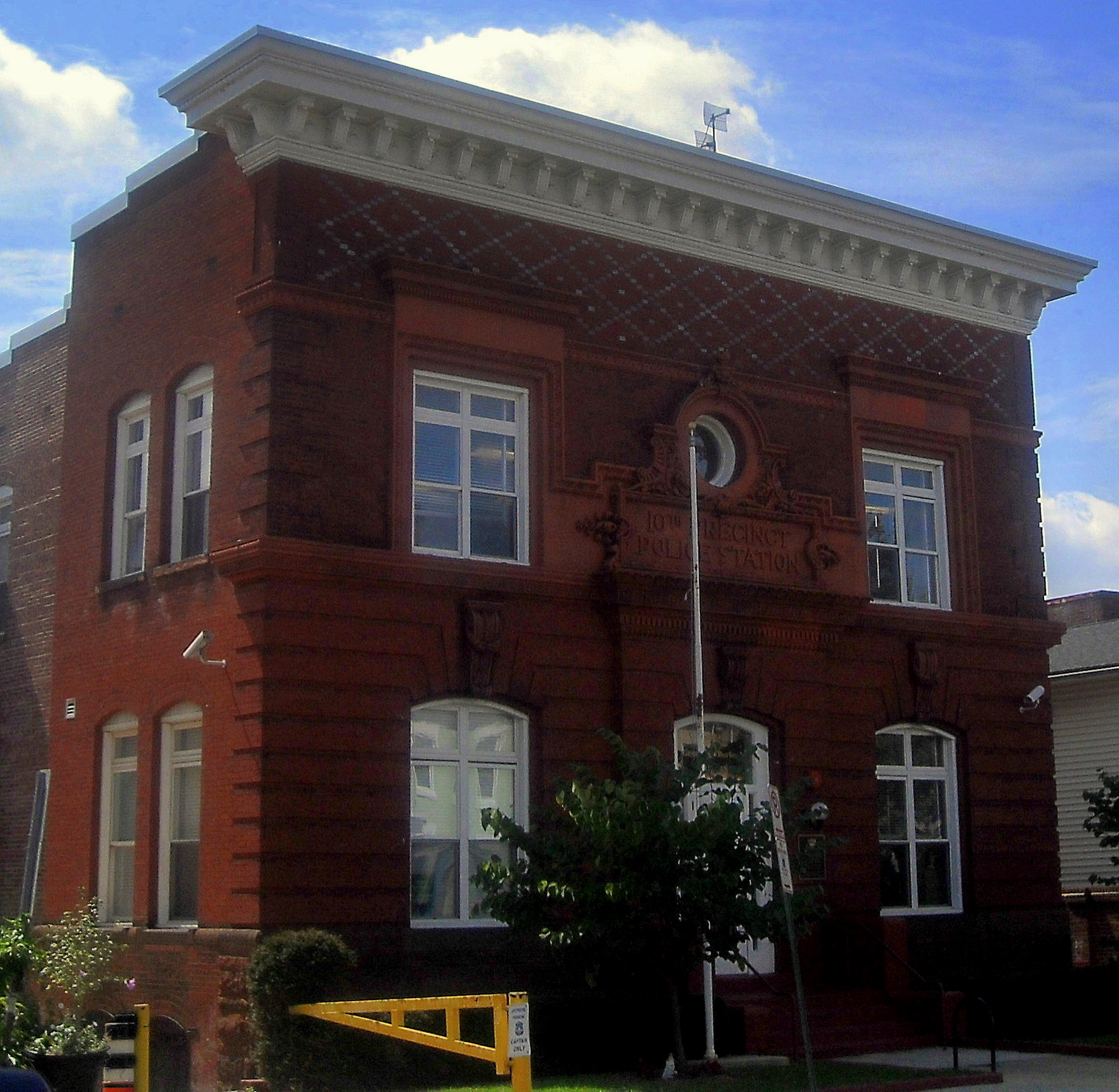
Tenth Precinct Station House, DC

The Tenth Precinct Station House, located at 750 Park Road, was designed by A.B. Mullett and Company and built in 1901. It is significant for its architectural character and its historical association with the police department of the District of Columbia in the late nineteenth and early twentieth centuries. The designation of the Tenth Precinct and the construction of the police station in 1901 were responses to the expansion of the city limits and urban population into this area. Reforms in the D.C. police department in the latter decades of the nineteenth century had led to the enlargement of the force and creation of new precincts.

The street system in the area north of Florida Avenue (formerly Boundary Street) had been surveyed by 1901, but few buildings had been constructed. By 1910, the block from Sherman Avenue to Georgia Avenue, in which the station house is located, was almost fully occupied by tradesmen and workers. The station house, assessed at $13,000, was by far the most imposing building on the block in which most of the properties were assessed at less than $1,000. Its imposing character in relation to the residential environs as well as its architectural quality suggested the importance of symbolic expression of authority. This expression is characteristic of the City Beautiful movement, a growing belief at the turn of the century that public structures should be imposing, monumental and of classical style.

Until 1886, the D.C. police department had been charged with corruption, political partisanship and venality. Subsequent reforms led to the enlargement of the force and creation of new precincts. Each station house was staffed by a captain, a lieutenant and several sergeants. The station house was the first facility to which an arrested man or woman was brought. At the station house, the arrest was recorded, and the prisoner was confined there until released on bail or removed, to police court for trial or to jail to await grand jury testimony. Misdemeanors were handled at the station house; felonies were dealt with in D.C. Supreme or Police Court.

Today, it houses the Metropolitan Police Department's Fourth District substation. The structure is listed on the District of Columbia Inventory of Historic Sites and the National Register of Historic Places.

==== Park View Christian Church ====
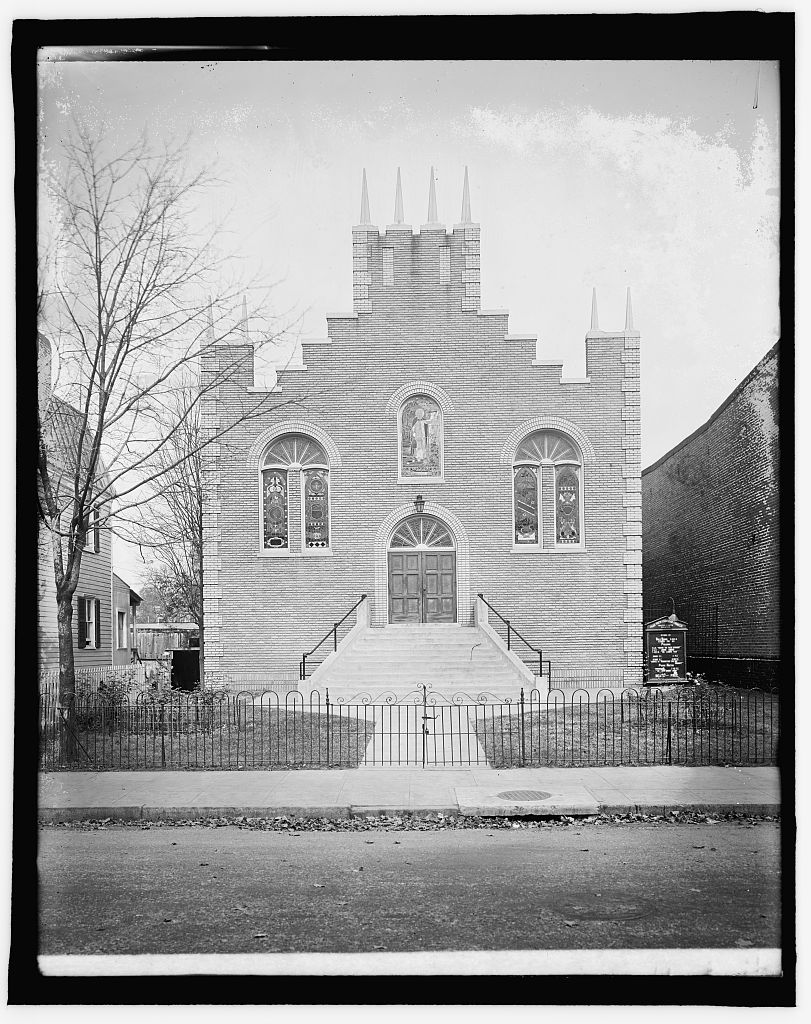
Park View Christian Church ca. 1920.

The old Whitney Avenue Christian Church which had been built in 1877 was replaced in 1920. At that time, it was among the oldest landmarks in Park View. The church, located at 625 Park Road, was the location of the earliest efforts to form the Park View community and build the new school on Warder.

In 1920, the old church was replaced with the building that is there now. The new building was renamed the Park View Christian Church and built at a cost of $30,000.

The congregation of the Park View Christian Church eventually moved to Shepherd Park, and the Trinity A.M.E. Zion Church moved to 625–627 Park Rd. in 1944. The structure supported Trinity's congregation until 1983, when Trinity moved to its current location on 16th Street.

The church currently supports the New Commandment Baptist Church. New Commandment purchased 625 Park Rd in 1995 for $600,000.

==== Park View School ====
The school located at the intersection of Warder and Newton streets was built in 1916 to designs by Snowden Ashford. The origin of the school can be traced back to the efforts of the Park View Citizens' Association and their persistent appeal to Congress for funds to purchase the land and build the school. Ashford designed the school in his preferred style of Collegiate Gothic. The interior is notable for the wooden truss that supports the auditorium roof.

It is constructed of red tapestry brick with trimmings of Bedford limestone and was built on some of the highest ground in the city. Originally a 16-room structure, the school quickly became too small for the needs of the community. In 1920 the progressive platoon school model was adopted which helped address the school's space problem. Two wings were finally added to the building and ready for use by 1931.

By the late 1940s, the racial makeup of the neighborhood had changed from predominantly white to predominantly black. As black schools were overcrowded and white schools were under-enrolled, Park View was transferred to the black division in 1949.

The school is still in use today as a District of Columbia Public Elementary School.

==== Princeton Heights Development ====
The section of Park View north of Otis, south of Rock Creek Church Road, and between Georgia Avenue and the Soldiers' Home was first developed as Princeton Heights. This area was originally the estate of the Cammack family, which was sold by the heirs in 1908 to builder Edgar S. Kennedy, who would eventually be associated with the Kennedy–Warren. Between 1909 and 1919, Kennedy subdivided the estate, put in roads, and built 162 contiguous homes in 20 separate rows. Kennedy's homes were known for their quality, non-static facades, and inclusion of progressive features. In 1919, Kennedy sold the unimproved land between Princeton Place and Otis Place to Herman R. Howenstein, who completed the development.

==== York Theater ====
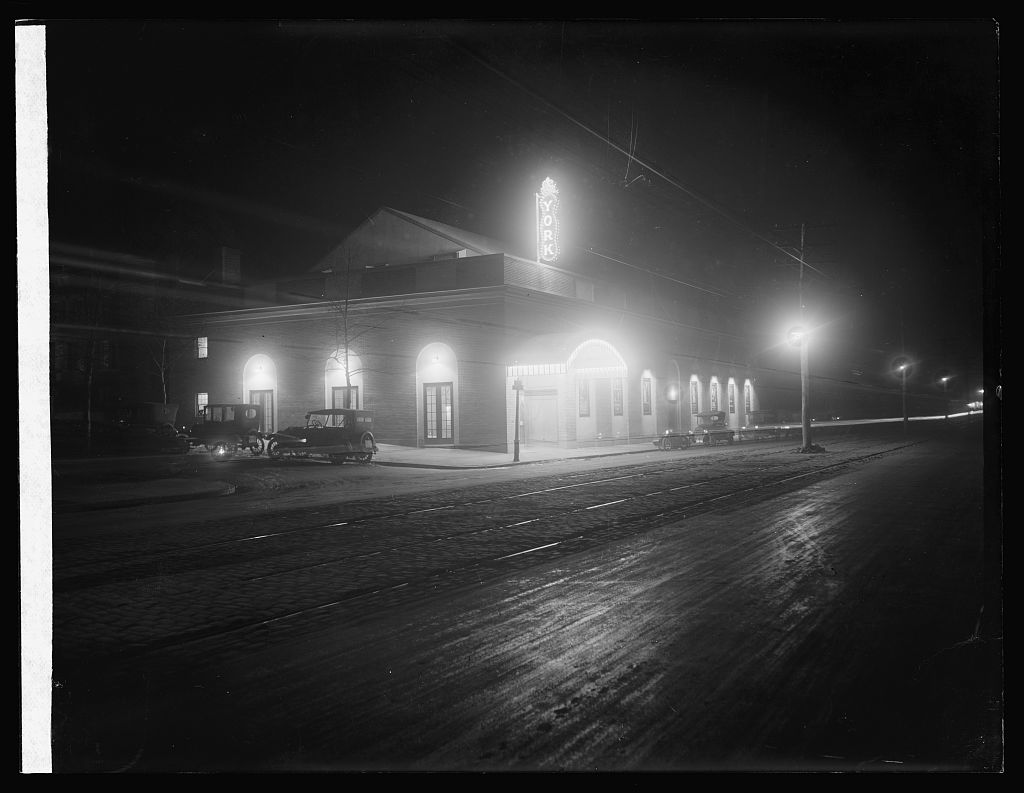
The York Theater at night, photographed ca. 1920

The York Theater, located at 3635–3641 Georgia Avenue, was designed by Reginald W. Geare as one of Harry Crandall's chain of theaters. Kennedy Brothers were hired as the builders, and it was one of the last two structures built by Kennedy in the Princeton Heights development. While newspaper accounts reported the theater to cost $100,000 to build, the estimate on the building permit valued the project at $50,000. The front of the structure was constructed of tapestry brick and trimmed with white stone and marble. Inside, the proscenium hangings were of rich gold velour enlivened with blue medallions and white figures in relief. Newspaper accounts also described the lighting system as unique.

The structure was in use as a theater as late as May 1954. It was purchased by the National Evangelistic Center in May 1957 and has been used as a church since them. Today, it is home of the Fishermen of Men Church.

== Development ==
Despite the early promise of development coming to Park View's section of Georgia Avenue when Temperance Hall opened at 3634 Georgia Avenue in January, 2006, it was not until 2009 that significant development began to take hold. Temperance Hall changed hands in early 2008 becoming the Looking Glass Lounge. In stark contrast, 2009 witnessed the groundbreaking of three major projects and the selection of a developer for a fourth.

Starting on August 10, 2009, the district began to demolish the 37-year-old Bruce-Monroe school with the goal of replacing it with a modern facility. Financing for a new school building continued to be difficult and the district's hope to develop the site as a mixed use public/private venture fell apart late in 2010. During this time, the 3-acre (12,000 m^{2}) site was transformed into an interim park that opened to the community at the end of July, 2010. With building a new school no longer an option, the district decided to move forward with modernizing the historic Park View School to meet the area's elementary school needs.

The Bernice E. Fonteneau Senior Wellness Center (Ward One Senior Wellness Center), located at 3531 Georgia Avenue, broke ground on October 14, 2009. The $5.2 million facility, containing 15,000 square feet (1,400 m^{2}) of space on three floors, had its official ribbon cutting on September 10, 2010, and was officially open for business on February 28, 2011, and dedicated in honor of Bernice E. Fonteneau on May 25, 2011.

The last building to break ground in 2009 was the CVS located on the southwest corner of Georgia and New Hampshire Avenues, which broke ground on November 12. The CVS was completed and open for business on July 25, 2010, with an official ribbon cutting ceremony attended by Mayor Adrian Fenty, councilmembers Jim Graham and Murial Bowser, deputy mayor for planning and economic development Valerie Santos, and other representatives from CVS and the developer LaKritz/Adler on July 27, 2010.

Building projects in Washington, including Georgia Avenue, stalled in 2010 due to the economy, but picked up again in 2011. In Park View, the resumption of development included Landex Corporation's The Avenue and Neighborhood Development Company's The Heights. The Avenue broke ground in April 2011 and was hailed as the first phase of the new Park Morton housing community. The Avenue was designed as an 83-unit mixed-use apartment building. Located at 3506 Georgia Avenue, NW, the building contains 81,044 square feet of residential space and 2,388 sq ft (221.9 m^{2}) of ground floor retail. It also includes a mix of one and two-bedroom apartment units. Residential space features a lounge, a fitness center, meeting rooms, and underground parking. The building opened with an official ribbon cutting on September 21, 2012.

The Heights broke ground in January 2012. The Heights, located at 3232 Georgia Avenue was designed as a mixed use development designed to contain 69 units with 10,000 sq ft (930 m^{2}) of ground floor retail. The project was completed in May 2013 and opened with a ribbon cutting on May 8, 2013.

Ground was also broken at the vacant lot at 3205 Georgia Avenue in April 2013. Currently under construction, the building is planned to have five floors and 31 1- and 2-bedroom rental units. Floors two through five will each have seven apartments. The first floor will have three.

Another major development planned for Georgia Avenue is the redevelopment of the Park Morton housing complex. Mayor Fenty announced the selection of Landex Corp. to redevelop the Park Morton complex on October 7, 2009. The first phase of the development, at 3506 Georgia, was completed in September 2012.

Two additional project are also in the works: The Vue by Neighborhood Development Company and The V by Velocity Capital. The Vue, at 3333 Georgia Avenue, is planned to rise seven-stories above the 7,000 sq ft (650 m^{2}) ground floor retail and offer 112 residences. Forty-nine parking spaces will be provided below grade.

The V, located at 3557 Georgia, is a six-story mixed-use project that consists of ground floor retail and twenty dwelling units above. The proposed retail space would contain approximately 2,138 sq ft (198.6 m^{2}) and would be appropriate for a café. The Otis Place side of the property could also support 530 sq ft (49 m^{2}) of outdoor seating should a future tenant apply for a public space permit. The residential units would consist of ten one-bedroom and ten two-bedroom units. The exact number that will be dedicated for affordable housing is not known, but the developer has indicated it would be more than the city required minimum.

== Real estate ==
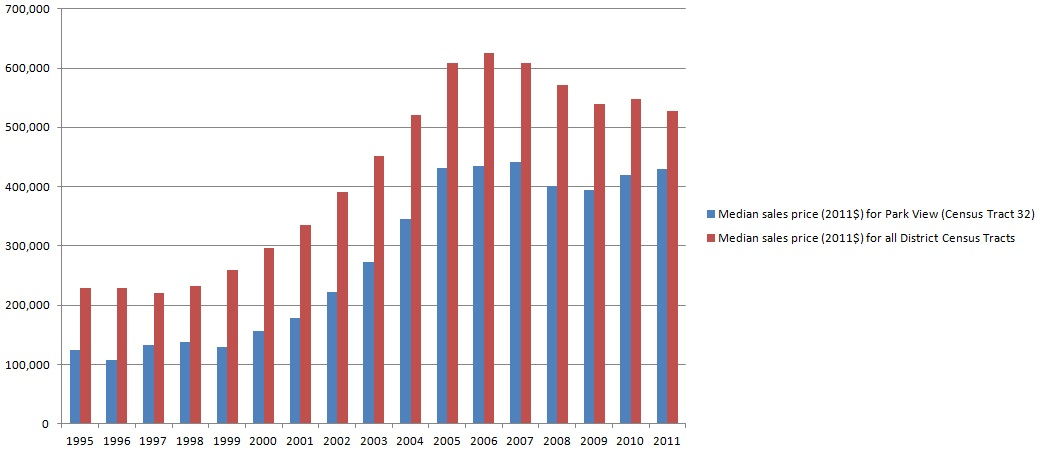
Median sales price for single-family homes in DC Census Tract 32 (Park View)

According to Housing Market (Single-Family Homes) statistics for 2011, 46 homes sold in Park View (census Tract 32). The median sales price for a home was $430,000, below the district average of $527,000.

== Transportation ==
The community is well served by two Metrorail stations. Both stations are on the Green line. Until 2023 the Yellow line also serviced this area, but was shortened to the Mt. Vernon Triangle. The most convenient for northern Park View is the Georgia Avenue–Petworth station which is situated at the northeast corner of Georgia and New Hampshire Avenues and just over the Park View border in Petworth. Central Park View is best served by the Columbia Heights station located at the intersection of Irving and 14th Streets—three blocks west of the neighborhood. The area is also served by a number of WMATA Metrobus lines.

In late October, 2009, DDOT held its first of the series of eight meetings focused on DC's transit future. At these meetings DDOT presented its plans for an extensive streetcar system it is planning to build in the city. Two of these planned lines would serve Park View. The first line would travel along Georgia Avenue and is included in DDOT's first phase plans. The second line would travel through the neighborhood along Irving Street and Columbia Road and is included in DDOT's third phase of the plan. Detailed plans for the streetcar system are yet to be completed.

== Education ==
Residents of Park View are served by the following schools in the District of Columbia Public Schools system.

Elementary schools

- Bruce-Monroe Elementary School at Park View
- Tubman Elementary School
- Raymond Education Campus (for residents north of Park Rd. & west of Georgia Ave.)

Middle schools

- MacFarland Middle School
- Columbia Heights Education Campus (for residents west of Georgia Ave.)

High school (primary)

- Cardozo Senior High School

Public Charter schools

There are several Public Charter schools in the area. These include:

- E.L. Haynes Public Charter School
