= Ferebee =

Ferebee is the name of several people:

- Dorothy Celeste Boulding Ferebee (1898–1980), American obstetrician and activist
- George Ferebee (flourished 1613), English composer
- Lewis Ferebee (born c. 1974), U.S. educator
- London R. Ferebee (1849 – after 1883), African preacher and author
- Thomas Ferebee (1918–2000), American bombardier
