= Hardy Middle School =

Hardy Middle School can refer to United States middle schools:

- Rose Hardy Middle School in Washington, DC
- Hardy Middle School in Jackson, Mississippi
