= Brightwood Education Campus =

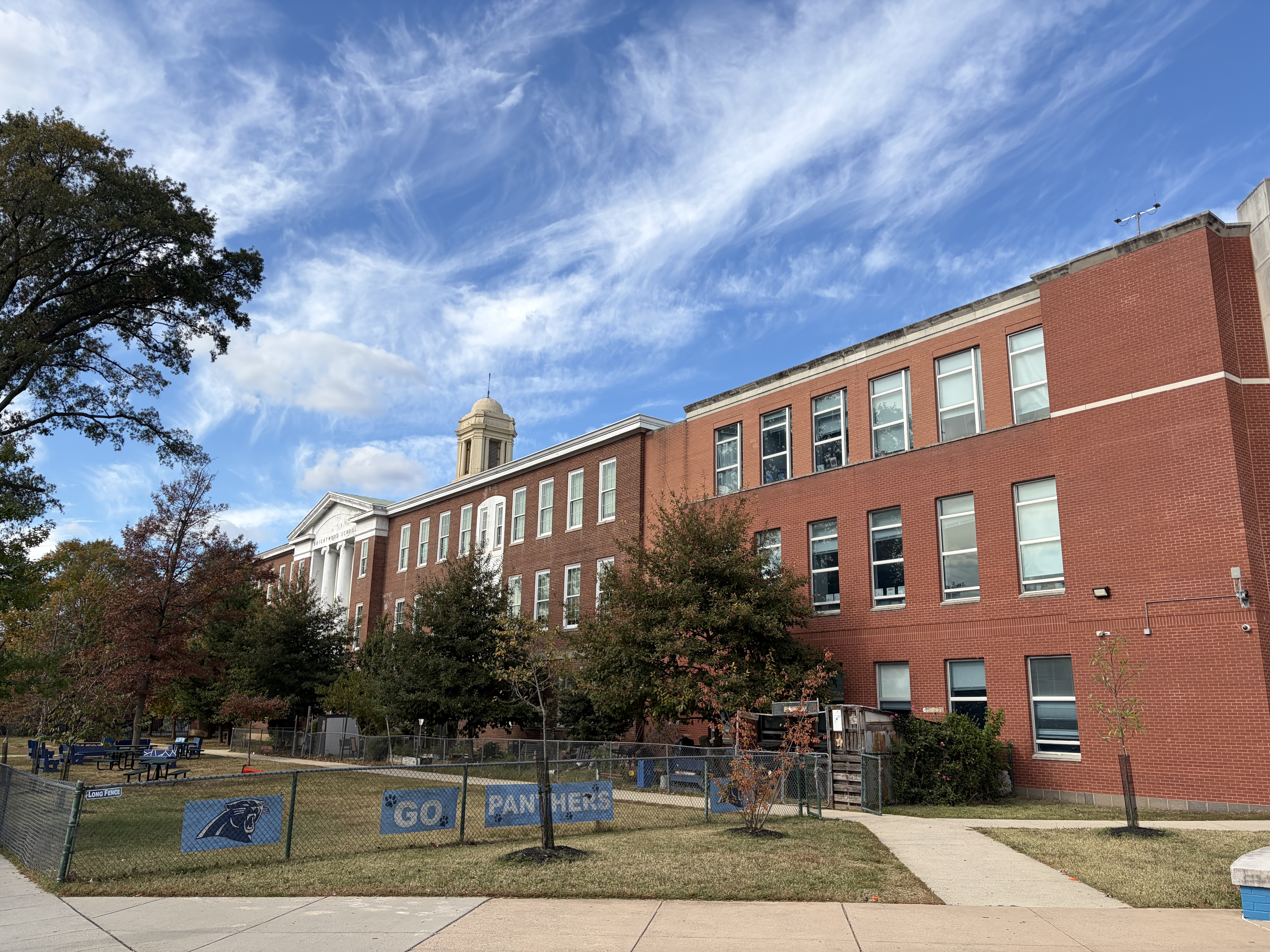
- Brightwood Elementary School in 2025

Location
- 1300 Nicholson Street NW; Washington, DC 20011; United States
- Coordinates: 38°57′38″N 77°01′50″W

Information
- School type: Public high school
- Opened: 1897 (original building)
- School district: District of Columbia Public Schools
- Principal: Wanda Fox
- Grades: Pre-school to eighth
- Enrollment: 563 (as of the 2010-2011 school year)
- Campus type: Urban
- Feeder schools: Coolidge Senior High School
- Website: brightwoodec.org

Brightwood Education Campus is a public school located in the Northwest quadrant of the District of Columbia.

== History ==
The original Brightwood School was a two-story brick building built around 1897 at Brightwood Avenue (now Georgia Avenue) and Peabody Street. Some of the land was acquired from the Emory Chapel, and some of the land was condemned from numerous heirs of Betsy Butler. Only white students were allowed to attend the school. Other children attended the Military Road School nearby.

Construction of an extension began in mid-1895 and completed in early 1896. The extension increased the size of the school to eight rooms and cost $11,600. The sidewalk in front of the school was paved in 1902.

Two large fires, occurring simultaneously, severely damaged the school building 1912. The fires were discovered at 8 p.m., and it took several hours to extinguish them. Students were temporarily reassigned to nearby West School and Brightwood Park School while Brightwood School was repaired. Upon inspecting the site, the fire marshal suspected arson immediately. One of the fires started under the teacher's desk in Miss H. K. Berne's classroom, and the fire marshal and police detectives interviewed each of the thirty students in Berne's class, but they could not determine who set the fire.

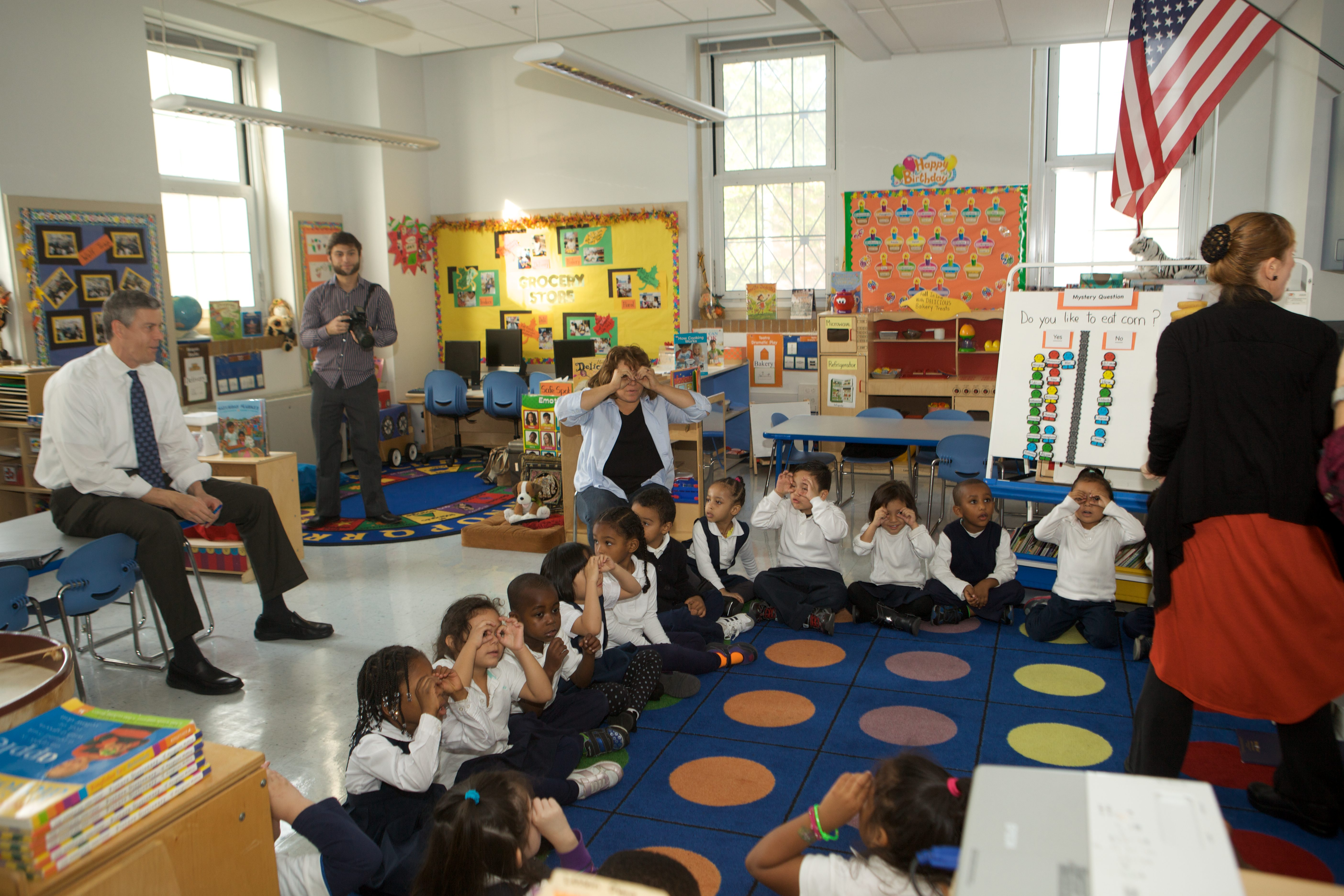
Education Secretary Arne Duncan (left) visits Brightwood Education Campus in 2013.

In 1923, the Manor Park Citizens Association passed a resolution requesting the building of a new school in the neighborhood, calling Brightwood Elementary School disgraceful and unsanitary in part because some boys had no other place to eat lunch than the lavatory. Three years later, Whittier School opened for children living in Manor Park.

In 1925, the House Appropriations Committee budgeted $275,000 to build a new sixteen-room building to replace the original school building. The plan for the new building included a gymnasium. Architect Waddy B. Wood designed the school. Construction bids were accepted in August 1925 and a contract was awarded to the lowest bidder the following month. The new 16-room school opened in September 1926. The old school building was converted into a junior high school for students in grades seven and eight.

Further improvements to the school were made in 2003.

== Academics ==
As of 2011, 31% of the school's students meet or exceed standards in math, and 36% of its students meet or exceed standards in reading. In comparison, the average for the District of Columbia Public Schools system is 42% for math and 43% for reading.

The school has a science lab and a computer lab.

== Student body ==
Most students who live in Brightwood are zoned for the school. As for other schools in the District of Columbia Public School system, children who live outside Brightwood Education Campus' zone may enter the Out of Boundary Lottery for a chance to attend the school.
