= Whittier Elementary School =

John Greenleaf Whittier Elementary School may refer to:

- Whittier Education Campus - Washington, DC - District of Columbia Public Schools
- Whittier Elementary School - Oak Park, Illinois (Chicago area) - Oak Park Elementary School District
- Whittier Elementary School - Jacinto City, Texas (Houston area) - List of Houston Independent School District elementary schools
- Whittier International Elementary School - Boulder, Colorado (Denver area) - Boulder Valley School District
- Whittier ECE-8 - Denver, Colorado - Denver Public Schools
- Whittier Elementary School - Brainerd, Minnesota - Brainerd Public Schools
- Whittier Elementary School - Toledo, Ohio - Toledo City School District
