= Susan E. W. Fuller =

American artist

- Born: 1831
- Died: July 6, 1907 (aged 75–76)

Susan E. W. Fuller (c. 1831 – July 6, 1907) was an American artist.

Fuller studied at the Cooper Union, and moved to Washington, D.C. in 1871. Beginning in 1873 she was the first instructor of art in the District of Columbia Public Schools, continuing until her death; from 1873 she ran the Washington School of Art as well. She also served as the director of art programs in Washington schools, and died in Washington. Fuller was a New York native who married Charles Oliver Fuller before 1859. He died of illness while serving in the American Civil War, leaving her with a son. She wrote A Manual of Instruction in the Art of Wood Engraving, published in 1867.
