= Bruce-Monroe Elementary School at Park View =

- Park View School
- U.S. National Register of Historic Places
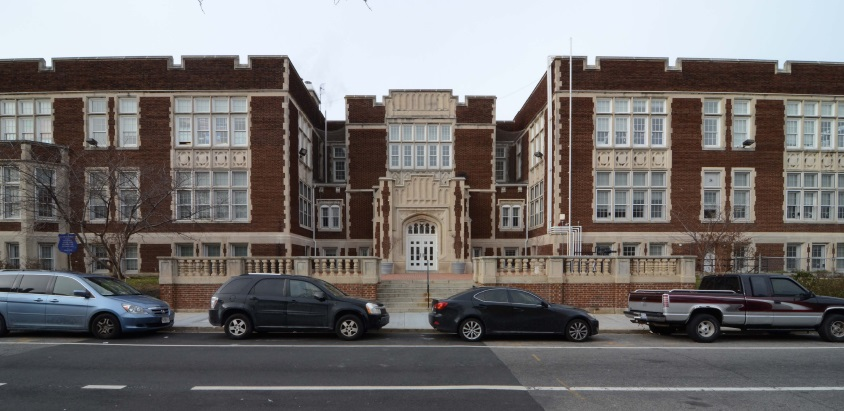
- Park View School in 2013

- Location within Washington, D.C.
- Location: 3560 Warder Street, NW; Washington, D.C.
- Coordinates: 38°56′04″N 77°1′16″W
- Built: 1916
- Architect: Snowden Ashford
- Architectural style: Collegiate Gothic
- NRHP reference No.: 13000213
- Added to NRHP: May 1, 2013

Bruce-Monroe Elementary School at Park View is a bilingual elementary school in Washington, D.C. Named after Blanche Bruce and James Monroe, it has been located in the historic Park View School in the city's Park View neighborhood since 2008. It is part of the District of Columbia Public Schools.

== Park View School ==
The building was designed by architect Snowden Ashford in 1916. It was listed on the District of Columbia Inventory of Historic Sites on May 24, 2012, and added to the National Register of Historic Places on May 1, 2013. The school continues to serve the community as an elementary school.

The origin of the school can be traced back to the efforts of the Park View Citizens' Association and their persistent appeal to Congress for funds to purchase the land and build a school for the white children in their growing neighborhood. Ashford designed the school in his preferred style of Collegiate Gothic. Unusual for an elementary school, Ashford's design included a dedicated auditorium with a notable wooden truss that supports the auditorium roof.

Originally a 16-room structure, the school quickly became too small for the needs of the community. In 1920 the progressive platoon school model was adopted, unique in Washington, which helped address the school's space problem. In 1929, 57 Park View students went on strike to protest the school district's attempt to shift enrollment to the Monroe School, in part because of the "gradual encroachment of the colored population on the Monroe School area."

In 1931, two new wings were added to the building to again provide room for the growing enrollment.

== Blanche Kelso Bruce Elementary School ==
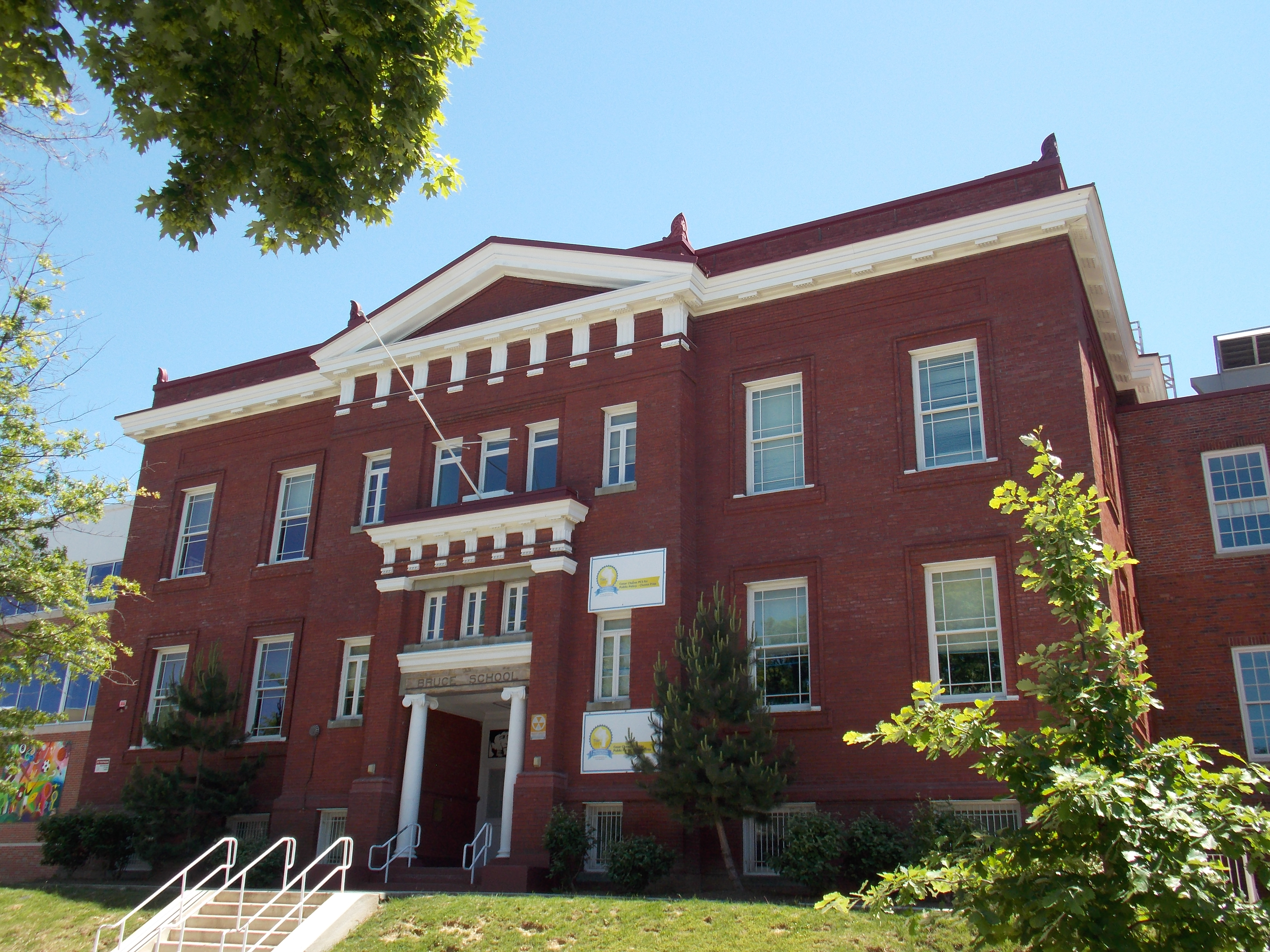
Blanche Kelso Bruce School building

The Blanche K. Bruce School was an all-black school and community center during the Jim Crow era. In July 1898, the District of Columbia public school trustees ordered that a then new public school building on Marshall Street be named the Bruce School in his honor. The Bruce School building was designed by architect William M. Poindexter in Renaissance Revival style of red brick with stone and pressed metal trim, with two floors of four rooms each. In 1927, a Colonial Revival style eight-room annex was constructed, designed by architect Albert L. Harris.

Marshall Street later became Kenyon Street. The Bruce School building became the charter Caesar Chavez Prep Middle School in 2009, named for the Mexican-American labor organizer Cesar Chavez. After the teachers unionized in 2017, the school was closed by the Chavez Schools in 2019.

The building was designated a D.C. historic site on November 20, 2014, and added to the National Register of Historic Places on March 31, 2015.

== James Monroe Elementary School ==
Opened in 1889 as an all-white school, the James Monroe School was switched to an all-black school in 1931 as the neighborhood's racial makeup changed and white enrollment declined. It was razed in 1971, with the exception of its auditorium, to make way for the integrated Bruce-Monroe Elementary School.

== Bruce-Monroe Elementary School ==
In 1969, Congress appropriated funds to construct the Bruce-Monroe school to replace the Bruce and Monroe Schools; construction began in 1971. In the fall of 1972, the Bruce-Monroe Elementary School opened on Georgia Avenue in Park View north of Howard University as an integrated school with an open-space classroom design.

In 2008, the Bruce-Monroe Elementary School was relocated from Georgia Avenue to the Park View School campus. The former building, including the historic Monroe auditorium, was razed in 2009. Following local activism to resist the construction of a parking lot, the school's former location became the Bruce Monroe Community Park and Garden in 2010.
