= Tenth Precinct Station House =

- U.S. National Register of Historic Places
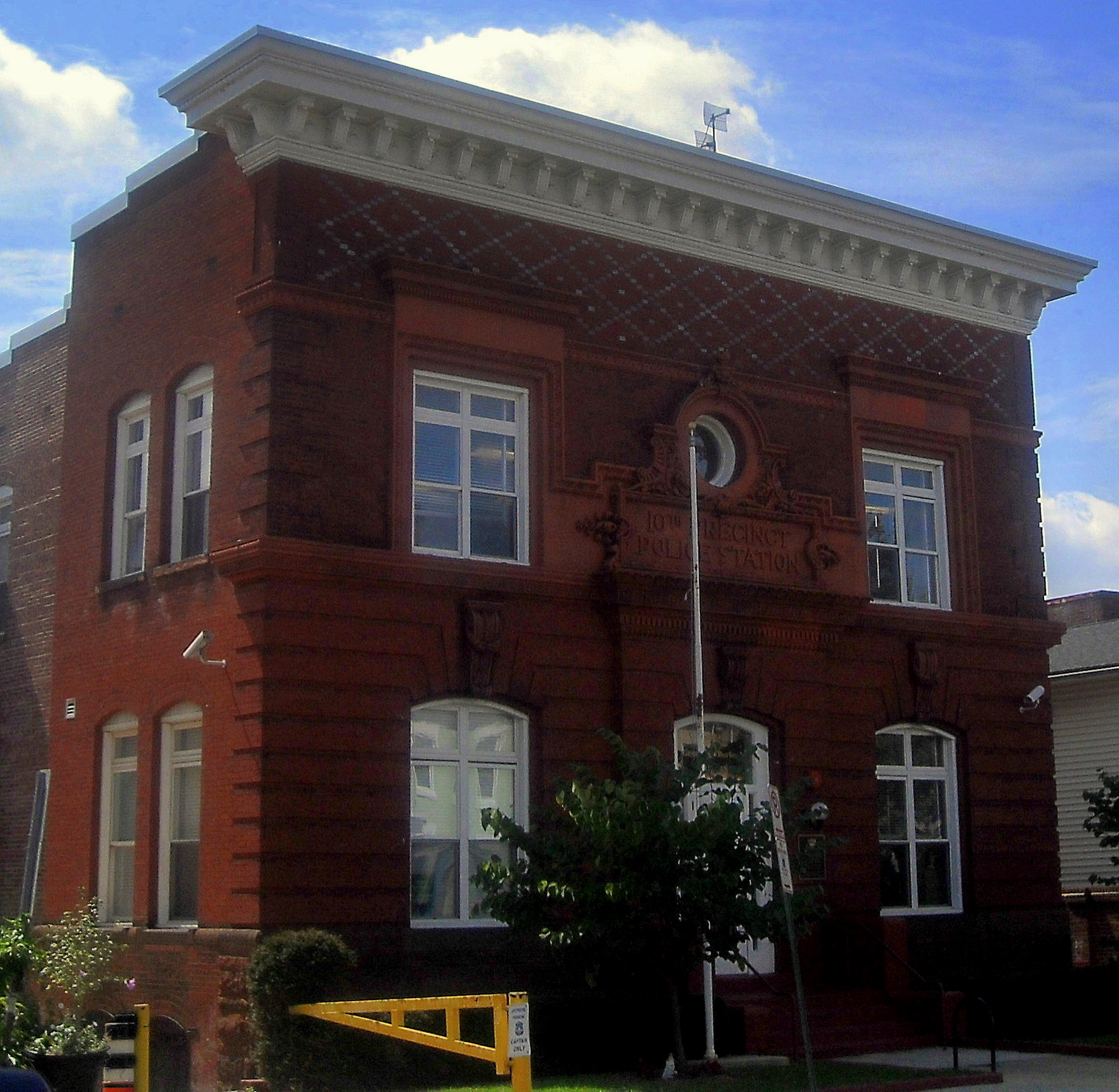
- Tenth Precinct Station House in 2008

- Location within Washington, D.C.
- Location: 750 Park Road, NW; Washington, D.C.
- Coordinates: 38°55′54″N 77°1′31″W
- Built: 1901
- Architectural style: A.B. Mullett & Co.
- NRHP reference No.: 86003063
- Added to NRHP: November 10, 1986

The Tenth Precinct Station House is an historic structure located in the Park View neighborhood of Washington, D.C. United States. The building was designed by the architectural firm of A.B. Mullett & Co. and was completed in 1905. It was constructed for Metropolitan Police Department.

It has been listed on the District of Columbia Inventory of Historic Sites and the National Register of Historic Places since 1986.

== See also ==
- National Register of Historic Places listings in the Bronx
- New York City Police Department
