= London R. Ferebee =

London R. Ferebee (1849 – AFT 1883) was an African Methodist Episcopal Zion Church preacher and author, who was born into slavery on August 18, 1849, in a place called Big Ditch, in Currituck County, North Carolina. He wrote his biography of being born into a slave family, surviving the American Civil War, his imprisonment and later work for the church. He worked while very young, and escaped at a young age. He made a life for himself in education, politics, and religion. He led a full life and, along the way, endured many sufferings and hardships.

== Biography ==
=== Early life and slavery ===
When he was still quite young, Ferebee's mother was sold because she beat her master to the ground. Ferebee was moved with his mother and two other children, and remained with his family until it was old enough to render services. He was then separated from his family and employed by a man named Edwin T. Cowles. Ferebee was still extremely young when he began to work. Because of Ferebee's youth, Cowles was extremely kind to him, and would not allow for him to be abused in any way.

=== Freedom and education ===
At twelve years old, Ferebee ran away with a group of Yankees, as they were called, who delivered him to his father, Abel M. Ferebee, in Elizabeth City, North Carolina. Together, they stayed in Elizabeth City until the Yankees announced that they were to travel to Newbern, NC. Figuring that moving to Newbern was safer than staying in Elizabeth City with the Civil War, both the Ferebees, and a large group of colored people, moved with the Yankees.

Once in Newbern, still under the care of his father, young Ferebee started attending private school at a Christian church. By the time he was fifteen, he was the top student in his class and had become an assistant teacher. While his health was starting to falter, at age thirteen, and his eyesight was beginning to fail him, he decided to take up a profession in religion. Soon thereafter, he was elected Superintendent of the Sabbath School, and then elected secretary of the church and Board of Trustees.

One morning, on Ferebee's accord, a young man by the name of Miles Bartlette was sent back a year, into primary school. A few days after this event, Bartlette attempted to kill Ferebee. Bartlette stabbed a dagger through Ferebee's left shoulder blade, barely missing his heart. Ferebee did survive, but was forced to stay in his home until October, when he was allowed to return to school.

=== Early career ===
In 1867, when Ferebee was eighteen, his father moved him back to Elizabeth City. The summer after his move, he was called to Nixonton to take charge of a private school. He taught here for three years, until entering himself in a normal school. He stayed in school until he had almost mastered an English education. Once he felt he was ready, he started learning law, and Latin, with Judge C. C. Pool. After he had completed his learning with Pool, Ferebee moved to teach in his own schoolhouse. He earned himself a good reputation as a teacher by the time he was twenty. He traveled to many different counties as a teacher, and soon had become a "swift politician".

=== Political career ===
Ferebee soon became a popular Republican. In 1872, he was known to be a reliable politician, and he had married a young woman who was named Lucinda Smith. He continued to dedicate his time to politics. He had, because of his outspoken opinion, made himself many enemies in his party (both men of color, and white men). In the same year, he was married, he was rallied against by his political enemies.

He was accused, by his peers, of stealing money from T.P. Wilcox. Ferebee was put through many court trials, and was continually found innocent. In the summer of 1873, the Democratic nominee for the Judge in the First District, Mills L. Eure was elected. After winning the election, Eure reopened the forgery case against Ferebee. Eure would not allow for Ferebee to present any evidence that proved him innocent, and the jury found him guilty. After twenty-seven days in prison, he was moved into a penitentiary, where he was to stay for four years.

=== Prison ===
While in penitentiary, Ferebee lost none of his religious reputation. He became the prison preacher. Meanwhile, the inmates and prison guards developed a strong liking to him, and would not abuse, or let others abuse him. After staying in the penitentiary for two years, he was chosen to go to the mountains and take up work there. He got to choose which of the inmates went with him, and after stewarding and cooking for the next five months, he was released.

=== Religious career ===
After his release from prison, he became determined to receive his preaching license, and in 1877, he succeeded. One year later, he applied to join the Annual Conference of the A.M.E. Zion Church. After deliberation by the Zion Church, he was received into conference and was assigned to Winston, North Carolina. There, he held charge for one year and a half. After his time in Winston, he was ordained by the church and in 1880, he was sent to Granville County, where he held charge for two years.

=== Late life ===
Ferebee was a preacher in Winston until his church was burned down. His last station was in Raleigh, North Carolina, where he wrote the narrative of his life, entitled "A Brief History of the Slave Life of Rev. L.R. Ferebee, and the Battles of Life, and Four Years of His Ministerial Life. Written from Memory. To 1882". The date of his death, after 1883, is unknown.
