= Lewis Ferebee =

U.S. educator (born c. 1974)

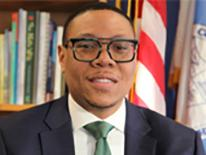

Chancellor of the District of Columbia Public Schools
- Incumbent
- Assumed office December 3, 2018; Acting: December 3, 2018 – March 4, 2019
- Appointed by: Muriel Bowser
- Preceded by: Amanda Alexander (acting)

Personal details
- Born: c. 1974
- Children: 1
- Education: North Carolina Central University (BA); George Washington University (MA); East Carolina University (EdD)

Lewis D. Ferebee (born c. 1974) is an American educator serving as the chancellor of the District of Columbia Public Schools since 2019. He was superintendent of Indianapolis Public Schools from 2013 to 2018. Ferebee was previously the chief of staff for Durham Public Schools for three years.

== Life ==
Ferebee was born c. 1974 to Charlotte and Lewis Ferebee. He earned a bachelor's degree in elementary education from North Carolina Central University. In 2000, he completed an M.A. in school administration from George Washington University.

Ferebee worked for Guilford County Schools in various roles. He was a teacher and later principal of Fairview Elementary School. In 2006, he was the principal of the year. He served as an instructional improvement officer and as one of the five regional superintendents. Ferebee was its enrichment region superintendent. For three years, Ferebee was the chief of staff for Durham Public Schools. He earned a D.Ed. in educational leadership from East Carolina University. His December 2009 dissertation was titled, Comparative Analysis of Demographic and Student Achievement Outcomes of Implementation of the No Child Left Behind Act (NCLB) Public School Choice Provision. Lynn Bradshaw was his dissertation director. At the time of his dissertation, Ferebee was married to Edye and had a son.

On September 23, 2013, he became the superintendent of Indianapolis Public Schools (IPS), succeeding Peggy Hinckley. In 2016, IPS renewed his contract until 2019. He was one of four finalists to lead the Los Angeles Unified School District before withdrawing his candidacy. In 2018, he was selected by Mayor Muriel Bowser as the chancellor of District of Columbia Public Schools. He acted in the role from January to March 2019 when the Council of the District of Columbia confirmed his appointment in a unanimous vote.
