= Tubman Elementary School =

Harriet Tubman Elementary School
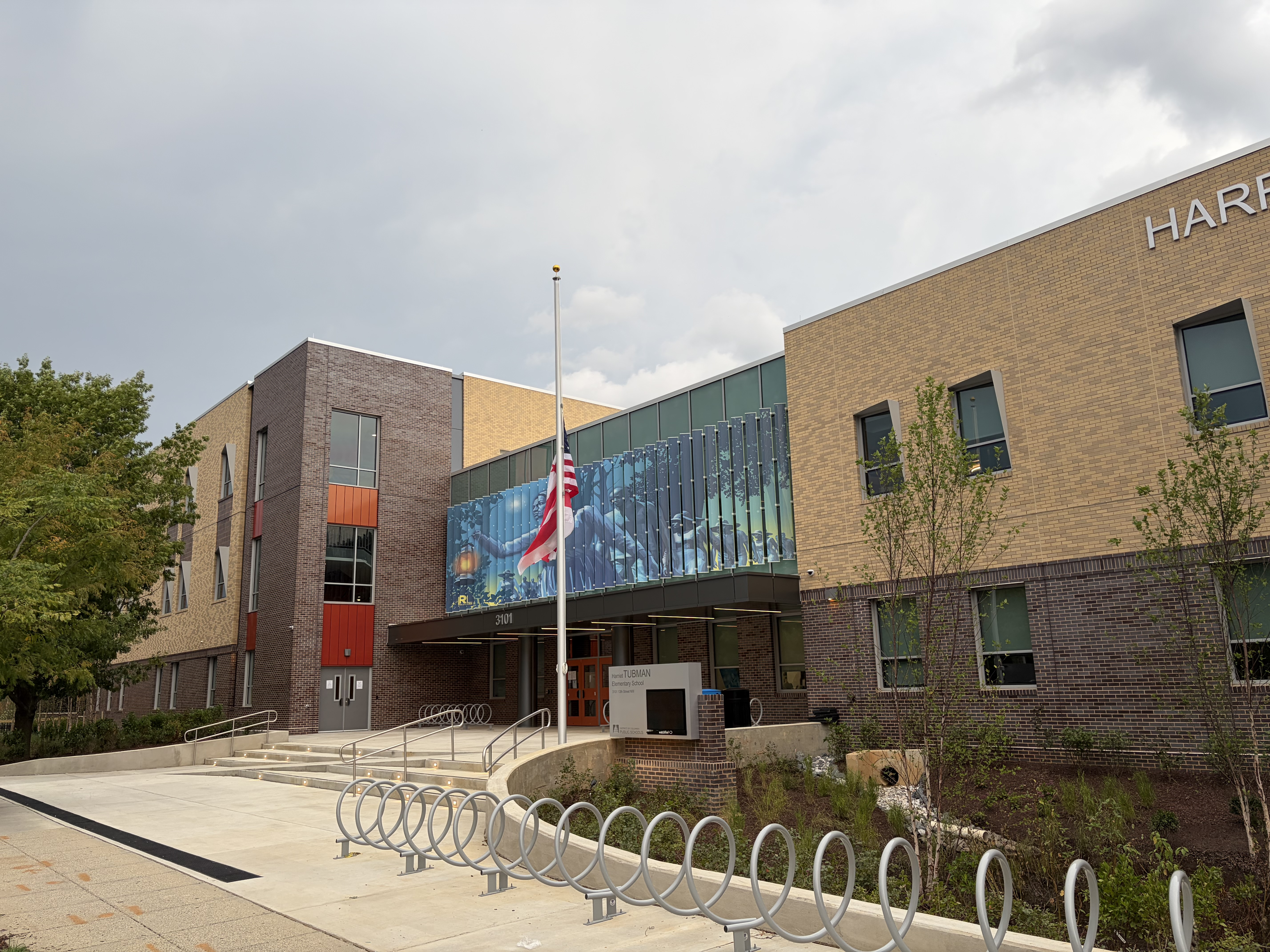
- Tubman Elementary School's newly built building in 2026

Location
- 3101 13th Street Northwest; Washington, DC 20010; United States; 38°55′44″N 77°1′46″W

Information
- School type: Public school Elementary
- Established: 1970
- School district: District of Columbia Public Schools Ward 1
- Principal: Amanda Delabar
- Faculty: 52.0 (on FTE basis)
- Grades: PS to 5
- Enrollment: 545 (2015-16)
- Student to teacher ratio: 8.88
- Campus size: 3.7 acres (1.5 ha)
- Campus type: Urban
- Mascot: Tubman Toad
- Website: http://teamtubman.com/

Harriet Tubman Elementary School is a public elementary school, named after Harriet Tubman, an African-American abolitionist, humanitarian, and Union spy during the U.S. Civil War. It is located in Washington, DC and is under the jurisdiction of the District of Columbia Public Schools. Over five hundred students are currently enrolled from pre-school to fifth grade. Harriet Tubman Elementary School began renovation in 2024 and was completed in the summer of 2026.

== History of Harriet Tubman and School ==
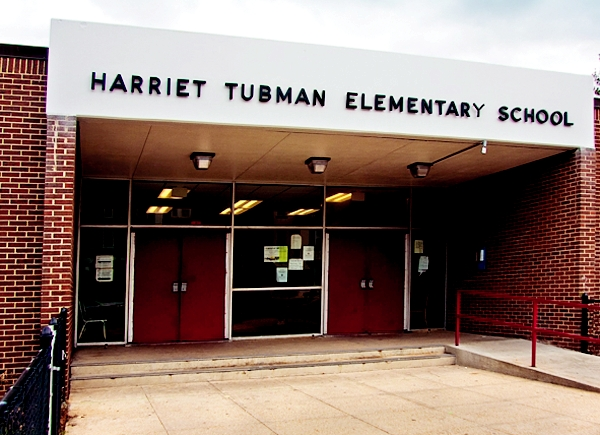
The former Tubman Elementary School building pictured in 2011

Harriet Tubman was born in Maryland; into slavery in 1820. Her original name was Araminta Ross. She changed her name later in life the Harriet Tubman after her mother. She escaped from slavery in 1849, and traveled north from Maryland. During this time, she gained her freedom and used that advantage to focus her efforts on freeing slaves. She led a team that helped free nearly 70-80 slaves. She used a group of safe houses called the "Underground Railroad." The team and the slaves worked and traveled at night and used coded language to communicate. She is noted as a legacy within the African-American historical community for her work in starting the underground railroad and her works during the civil war. Harriet Tubman Elementary School was built in 1970, shortly after the 1968 Washington, D.C. riots which ravaged its neighborhood of Columbia Heights.

== 2026 modernization and public art ==
The school's 2026 modernization included a collection of site-specific public artworks commissioned through the District of Columbia Department of General Services. The works, installed throughout the school and its grounds, use imagery related to Harriet Tubman, freedom, community and the history of the surrounding neighborhood.

Among the works is Enduring Dreams of Home, an 11-foot-tall weathering steel sculpture by Michael Janis and Washington Glass Studio. Located outside the school, the sculpture combines fractured forms based on Washington rowhouses with a cut-through portrait of Tubman.

== Programs and students ==
The school has regular graffiti cleaning, students have received free dental care, and D.C. Discovery Days give them field trips out of the neighborhood. Nevertheless, in 2007 a student from Tubman joined others in voicing concern over safety in the public school district. 85% of the student body qualify for free or reduced-price lunches. Harriet Tubman offers a variety of afterschool programming such as DC Scores, Math Matters tutoring, Girls on the run, Girls inc, Amazing Athletes, Soccer Stars, and Chess Wizards. The school has a basketball team and soccer team that compete against other elementary schools district wide. We offer specialized computer programming and coding as well.

== Awards and recognition ==
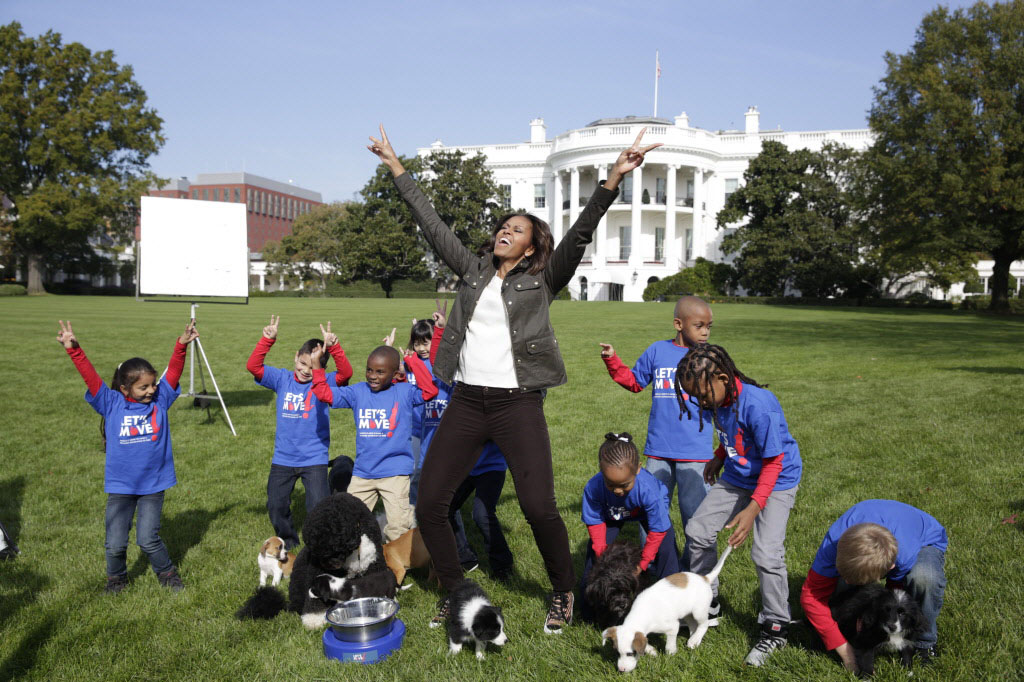
First Lady Michelle Obama and Students from Harriet Tubman Elementary School Film an Episode of Puppy Bowl for Animal Planet

Former principal Sadia M. White won a National Distinguished Principals award in 2004 for her work at Tubman. According to National Association of Elementary School Principals, under White, Tubman Elementary met all its goals for standardized test scores and White supervised the launch of an inclusion-teaching model featuring team-teaching by general education, special education teachers, and teachers of new English-language learners. The association also commended her institution of a comprehensive school-wide positive-approach discipline program that included a due process system for punishment referrals and intervention strategies for classroom teachers for preventing problems.

On November 27, 2001, First Lady Laura Bush hosted Tubman Elementary students at the White House for a screening of the film, Twice Upon a Christmas.

In 2005, Cory Chimka, fourth grade teacher at Harriet Tubman, was named National Kind Teacher of the Year by the National Association for Humane & Environmental Education.
