= Whittier Education Campus =

J.G. Whittier Elementary School
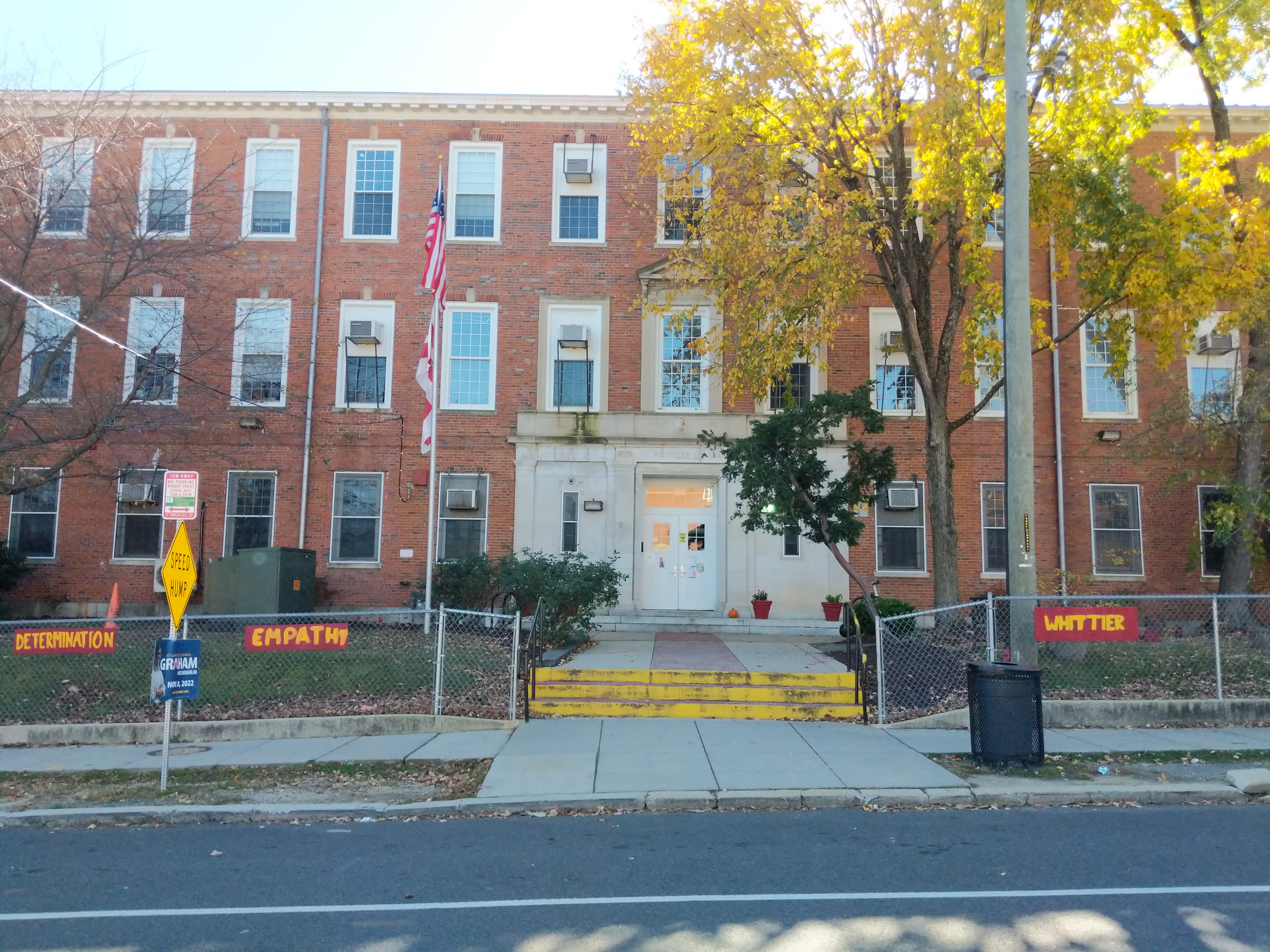

Location
- 6201 5th Street NW; Washington, DC 20011; United States; 38°57.9005′N 77°1.1912′W

Information
- School type: Public Elementary School
- Opened: 1926; 100 years ago
- School district: District of Columbia Public Schools
- Principal: Tenia Pritchard
- Faculty: 39 FTE
- Grades: Preschool to 5th Grade
- Enrollment: 365 (2015-16)
- Student to teacher ratio: 11
- Campus type: Urban
- Mascot: Warriors
- Feeder schools: Coolidge Senior High School

J.G. Whittier Elementary School is a public elementary school located in the Northwest quadrant of the District of Columbia.

== History ==
=== Advocacy ===
Prior to the building of Whittier Elementary School, children who lived in Manor Park attended Brightwood Elementary School. In 1923, the Manor Park Citizens Association passed a resolution requesting the building of a new school in the neighborhood, calling Brightwood Elementary School disgraceful and unsanitary. The association suggested the new school be built at Third and Rittenhouse Streets so the neighborhood's schoolchildren would not need to walk far to attend school. Senator Isaac Roop of Nevada submitted a bill to appropriate $150,000 for the construction of the new school in 1924.

After a five-year-old child from Manor Park was struck by a car while walking home from Brightwood Elementary School in 1924, the Manor Park Citizens Association threatened to withdraw their children from school unless a new school was built in the neighborhood. The association noted that crossing two different street car tracks and walking along streets without sidewalks was not safe for children going to school. The superintendent, Dr. Frank W. Ballou, supported the idea, and the school board voted in favor of building the school.

=== Construction ===
Following a Congressional appropriation to build a school, the assistant superintendent visited several potential sites. A plan was developed to build an eight-room school at Fifth and Sheridan Streets, but the neighborhood association wanted a portable school opened until the permanent school was scheduled to be opened in 1926. The association also advocated for a sixteen-room school instead. The supervising principal of the area opposed the idea of a temporary portable school, saying that would result in 83 children from grades one through eight being taught in just one room. The association then refocused their efforts, requesting the renting of an eight-room building to be used as a temporary school. With support from the Takoma Park Citizen's Association, a temporary portable school was approved. After the school board removed funding to construct a permanent school from its budget, the Manor Park Citizens Association petitioned Congress to provide for a school with room for expansion.

A portable school opened on December 15, 1924. Approximately thirty students in kindergarten, first, and second grades enrolled in the first year, taught by Miss R.F. Cogovan. In the second year, the teacher was Miss A.E. Rogers.

In January 1925, the District's Congressional appropriation included $140,000 of funding to build a permanent school.

Architect Ward Brown designed the school, and those plans were announced in July 1925. The school would be located on Sheridan Street between Fourth and Fifth Streets, and it would include a playground. Construction was to begin in August 1925, and the school was scheduled to open in May 1926. The land was purchased for $20,000.

The Commissioners of the District of Columbia received three bids to construct the school, and all three bids exceeded the money appropriated by Congress; the lowest bid exceeded it by $20,000. The District rejected all three bids for exceeding the Congressional appropriation, and the engineer commission decided he would speak to Congress about the results of the procurement. The Manor Park Citizen's Association criticized the delays. Meanwhile, a similar situation occurred with the procurement of bids to build a different school on Calvert Street; the lowest bid for that school exceeded the Congressional appropriation by $7,000. The school board decided to modify the construction plans to keep within the appropriation and decided to begin construction. The engineer commissioner defended his decision to build the school on Calvert Street but not the school in Manor Park, saying that the excess for the Manor Park school was much greater, and speculating that the neighborhood would not want a school modified so greatly. The municipal architect assured residents that the school would ultimately be built in time to open in September 1926. Two days later, the District signed a contract with the contracting firm of Skinker & Garrett to build the school. In order to stay within the Congressional appropriation, the plans were revised to omit a principal's office, a health clinics, and a library. Construction began on September 29, 1925.

=== Opening ===
In 1926, the school was completed and dedicated to John Greenleaf Whittier. The school's first principal was Miss H.G. Nichols. A parent-teacher association was organized and raised funds to purchase playground equipment. The portion of Sheridan Street facing the school was paved in 1927.

=== Expansion ===
Following advocacy by the Manor Park Citizens Association, the District Commissioners approved adding eight rooms to the school, with construction estimated to be completed in July 1931. After soliciting construction bids in December 1930, the construction contract was awarded to the lowest bid, $83,940 from Graham Construction Company, and construction began in January 1931. Following the completion of construction in September, the expansion was officially dedicated in November.

Construction of an auditorium for the school was included in the District's 1937 budget. Until this point, most meetings were held in a hallway, which had been nicknamed the Tower of Babel.

== Academics ==
Whittier has had a science, technology, engineering, and math (STEM) program since 2009. Whittier's curricula combines science, math, and technology with all major subjects. The school has a science lab and a computer lab. Students may also take classes in art and dance, and 96% of the students learn Spanish.

As of 2011, 41% of Whittier's students meet or exceed standards in math, and 38% of its students meet or exceed standards in reading. In comparison, the average for the District of Columbia Public Schools system is 42% for math and 43% for reading.

== Athletics ==
Whittier has an elementary school-age basketball teams for boys and one for girls. It also has a middle school-age basketball team for boys. Whittier has a middle school-age track and field teams for boys and girls. Whittier also has a tennis team, a cheerleading team, a swim team, and a baseball team.

== Student body ==
Students who live in parts of Manor Park, Brightwood, Brightwood Park, and Riggs Park are zoned for Whittier. As for other schools in the District of Columbia Public School system, children who live outside Whittier's zone may enter the Out of Boundary Lottery for a chance to attend Whittier. Eighty-three percent of Whittier's students live within one mile of the school.
