= District of Columbia Public Schools =

American public school system

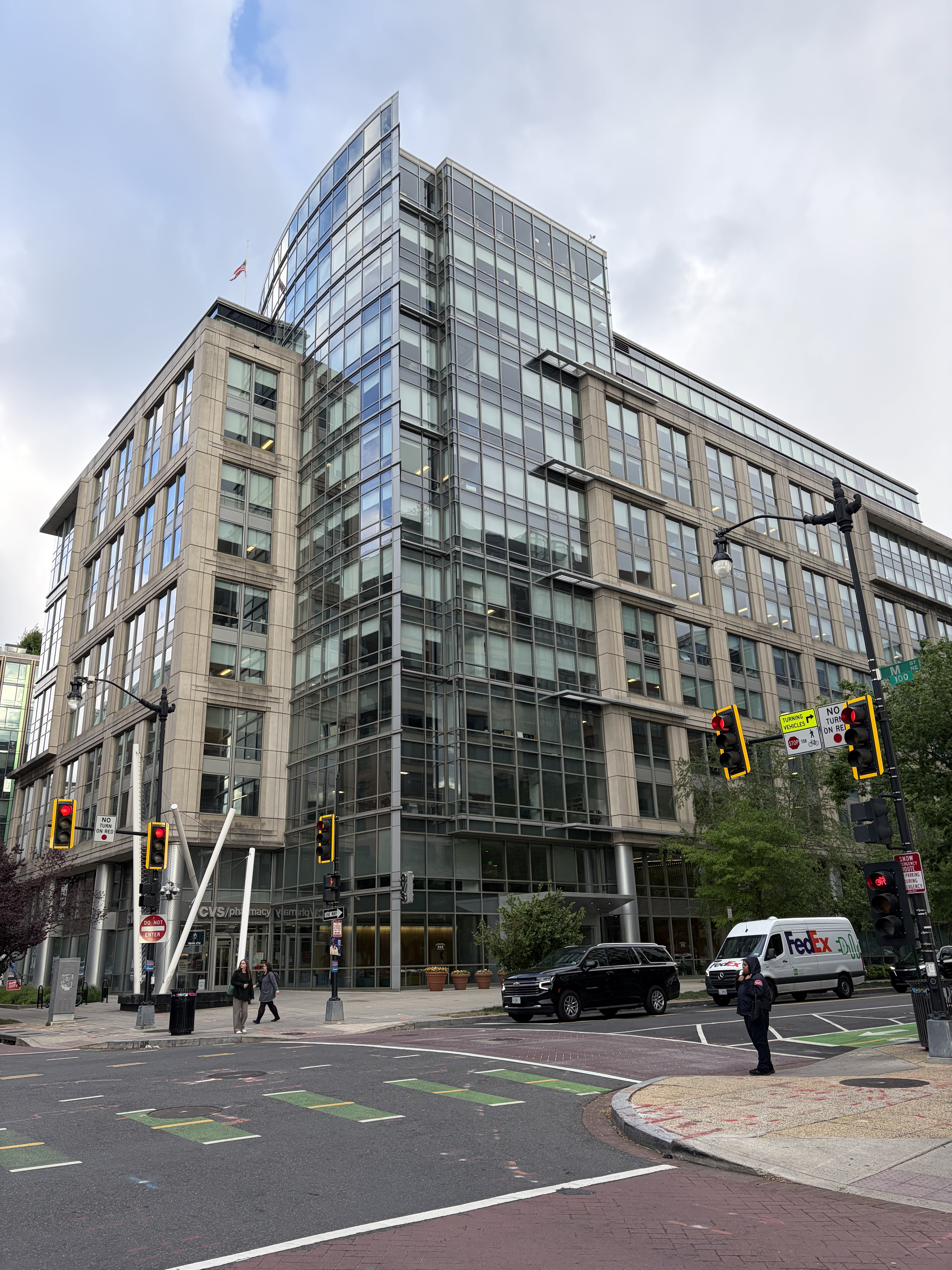
- DCPS' headquarters building in NoMa

Location
- 1200 First Street, NE, Washington, D.C. 20002 Mid-Atlantic, Southeast United States

District information
- Type: Public
- Grades: PK–12
- Established: September 23, 1805; 221 years ago
- Chancellor: Lewis Ferebee
- Schools: 117
- Budget: $701,344,630
- NCES District ID: 1100030

Students and staff
- Students: 50,839
- Teachers: 4,564.64 (on an FTE basis)
- Staff: 3,767.57 (on an FTE basis)
- Student–teacher ratio: 11.14

Other information
- Website: dcps.dc.gov

The District of Columbia Public Schools (DCPS) is the local public school system for the District of Columbia, in the United States. It is distinct from the District of Columbia Public Charter Schools (DCPCS), which governs public charter schools in the district.

== Student body ==
=== Enrollment ===
DCPS schools offer education from pre-kindergarten to 12th grade, as well as education for adults. During the 2023–2024 school year, there were 50,839 students enrolled in DCPS, and 4,564.64 FTE teachers, with a student–teacher ratio of 11.14.

Enrollment in D.C. public schools previously reached a peak of 150,000 students in the 1960s before declining over the following decades. In 1996, the first public charter schools opened in the district, drawing more students away from DCPS schools. During the COVID-19 pandemic, public school enrollment decreased in the district as many families chose homeschooling or enrolled their children in private schools.

=== Demographics ===
The racial and ethnic breakdown of students enrolled in the 2023–2024 school year was 55% Black, 22% Hispanic, 18% White, and 5% other races. DCPS schools have seen a steady increase in White and Hispanic students since the 2013–2014 school year, due to more White students enrolling in pre-kindergarten and elementary schools, and more Hispanic students enrolling in middle and high schools. By contrast, in 2000, the racial and ethnic breakdown of public school students was 84% Black, 9% Hispanic, 5% White, and 2% other races.

As of the 2023–2024 school year, 16% of students were enrolled in special education, 16% were English-language learners, and 46% were deemed "at risk of academic failure".

=== Attendance ===
School is compulsory in Washington, D.C., for students between the ages of 5 and 17. As of the 2024–2025 school year, 38% of DCPS students from kindergarten to 12th grade were chronically absent, meaning a student missed 10% or more of the school year. During the same school year, DCPS referred 4,956 students ages 5 to 13 to the district's Child and Family Services Agency for educational neglect. DCPS referred an additional 1,495 students ages 14 to 17 to the district's Court Social Services Division for truancy.

=== Graduation rate ===
As of 2024, 77% of DCPS students graduated high school within four years, an increase from 54% in 2012. The 2024 data shows that 73% of Black students and 76% of Hispanic students graduated in four years, compared to 96% of White students.

In 2017, a report by WAMU and NPR called into question Ballou High School for graduating students that should have failed due to frequent absences. In response, the District's Office of the State Superintendent of Education commissioned an audit that found that 1 in 3 graduates of DCPS high schools that year should not have graduated based on their attendance records.

== Teachers ==
Under Teacher Leadership Innovation (TLI), experienced teachers can apply for specialized positions in which they spend at least 50% of their time teaching in the classroom and the rest of the time coaching other teachers and leading school teams.

DCPS has more than 4,000 teachers as of July 2024.

== Governance ==
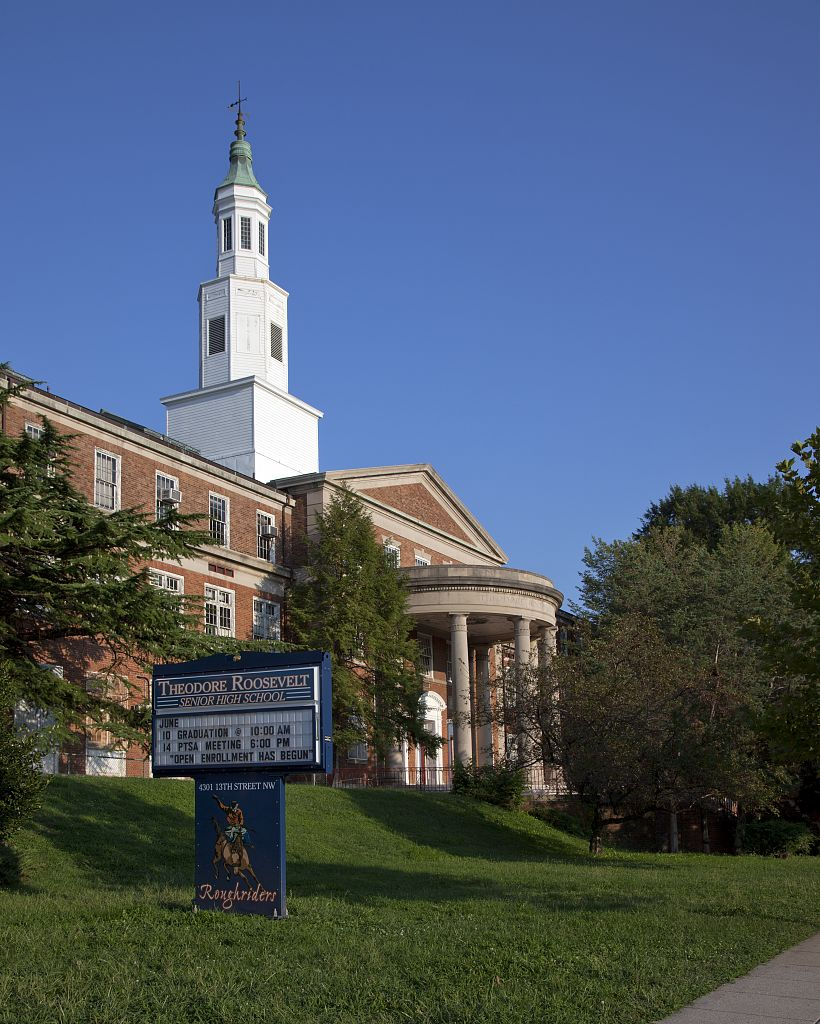
Theodore Roosevelt High School in Petworth

Within DCPS, schools are classified as either a "neighborhood school" or a "destination school". Neighborhood schools are elementary or secondary schools assigned to students based on their address. Destination schools are feeder-schools for elementary or secondary institutions from a school a student is already attending. Since the fall of 2009, students may choose a destination school, regardless of their neighborhood location. Locations of all schools and the neighborhood divides can be found on the DCPS website.

For the school year ending in spring 2007, the DCPS was governed by the District of Columbia State Board of Education, with eleven members, including two students who had the right to debate but not to vote. Five members were elected, and the Mayor appointed four. The board established DCPS policies and employed a superintendent to serve as chief executive officer of the school district, responsible for day-to-day operations. Four board members represented specific geographical boundaries, and the Board President was elected at large. One condition of the District of Columbia Public Education Reform Amendment Act of 2007 was creating DCPS as a separate cabinet-level agency from the D.C. Board of Education. This moved DCPS within the executive branch of the District of Columbia government—specifically, under Mayoral control. Currently, DCPS is subordinate to District of Columbia Mayor Muriel Bowser. D.C. Mayor Adrian Fenty proposed putting the public schools under the direct control of the Mayor's Office upon taking office in January 2007. However, this reform to District of Columbia Public Schools was encouraged by his predecessor and constituents at large. It also placed all of the District of Columbia public charter schools under the care of a new board—the District of Columbia Public Charter School Board (PCSB). Although these schools were previously a part of DCPS, they are now considered a separate district controlled by the D.C. Public Charter School Board (PCSB).

The D.C. Council passed the Mayor's proposal into law, but since the change amended the Home Rule Act, the change needed to gain federal approval before taking effect. D.C. Delegate Eleanor Holmes Norton introduced H.R. 2080, a bill to amend the D.C. Home Rule Charter Act to provide for the Mayor's proposal. H.R. 2080 was passed by the United States House of Representatives under an expedited procedure on May 8, 2007, by a voice vote. After three U.S. Senators (Ben Cardin of Maryland, Mary Landrieu of Louisiana, and Carl Levin of Michigan) initially placed "holds" on the bill to prevent its consideration in the United States Senate, the Senate agreed to pass H.R. 2080 without amendment on May 22, 2007, by unanimous consent. On May 31, 2007, the bill was presented to the President, and President Bush signed H.R. 2080 into law on June 1, 2007. After the standard Congressional review period expired on June 12, 2007, the Mayor's office had direct control of the Superintendent and the school budget. On June 12, Mayor Fenty appointed Michelle Rhee the new Chancellor, replacing Superintendent Clifford B. Janey.

=== D.C. School Choice Incentive Act of 2003 ===
In January 2004, Congress passed the D.C. School Choice Incentive Act of 2003. The law established a federally-funded private school voucher program known as the D.C. Opportunity Scholarship Program (OSP). The OSP distributes vouchers to low-income families to cover private school tuition. Because there are more eligible applicants than available vouchers, they are distributed by lottery. In 2010, a randomized controlled trial conducted under the auspices of the Department of Education examined the impacts of the OSP students, finding that it raised graduation rates. Students who were offered vouchers had a graduation rate of 82%, while those who used their vouchers had a graduation rate of 91%. By comparison, the rate for students who did not receive vouchers was only 70%. The study received the Department of Education's highest rating for scientific rigor. Over 90% of the study's participants were African American, and most of the remainder were Latino American. Further research found that students who received vouchers were 25% more likely to enroll in college than students with similar demographic characteristics who did not receive vouchers.

=== Marian Anderson controversy ===
In 1939, writing on behalf of the Board of Education of the District of Columbia now the District of Columbia State Board of Education, Ballou denied a request by contralto Marian Anderson to sing at the auditorium of the segregated white Central High School. As justification, he cited a federal law from 1906 requiring separate schools for the District. Meanwhile, the Daughters of the American Revolution had rejected a similar application. When Eleanor Roosevelt resigned from that organization in protest, author Zora Neale Hurston criticized her for remaining silent about the fact that the board had also excluded Anderson. "As far as the high-school auditorium is concerned," Hurston declared "to jump the people responsible for racial bias would be to accuse and expose the accusers themselves. The District of Columbia has no home rule; it is controlled by congressional committees, and Congress at the time was overwhelmingly Democratic. It was controlled by the very people who were screaming so loudly against the DAR. To my way of thinking, both places should have been denounced, or neither." Although Anderson later performed at an open-air concert at the Lincoln Memorial, the board retained its policy of exclusion.

=== D.C. Public Education Reform Amendment Act of 2007 ===
The Council of the District of Columbia enacted the DC Public Education Reform Amendment Act of 2007. This act established a DC public school agency based on authority given to the council in the District of Columbia Home Rule Act of 1973. The Department of Education that was established under the Mayor triggered several changes. The largest was already discussed—DCPCS gained sole authority over chartering and chartered schools, DCPS became subordinate to the Mayor's office. Secondly, many more minor authoritative changes took place. The first is that the State Education Office (SEO) became the State Superintendent of Education (OSSE). The four subsections of the District were reaffirmed through location-based State Board of Education selectees. In addition, the smaller eight school election wards were reaffirmed. Finally, the commission was established through this legislature. The "Commission" is the Interagency Collaboration and Services Integration Commission, which includes the Mayor, Chair of the Council of the District of Columbia, Chief Judge of the D.C. Superior Family Court, Superintendent of Education, Chancellor of DCPS, Chair of DCPCSB, and fourteen others.

After the 2007–2008 school year, about one-fifth of the teachers and one-third of the principals resigned, retired, or were terminated from DCPS. DCPS initially experienced a powerful negative impact due to the loss. A GAO-conducted study recommended that the Mayor direct DCPS to establish planning processes for strikes and look to performance reviews from central offices to strengthen accountability. These recommendations were followed, and accountability has increased through academic and financial report generation. Increased accountability made way for other small reforms. One example is implementing a requirement that students entering ninth grade sit down with a school counselor and construct a course plan to reach graduation.

River Terrace Elementary School and Shaed Education Campus shut their doors at the end of the 2010–2011 and 2011–2012 school years, respectively. Students attending River Terrace and Emery Education Campus moved to the Langley Building. In 2019, a proposal was submitted to close Metropolitan High School, an alternative school.

== No Child Left Behind compliance ==
In accordance with Section 1116, a provision of the No Child Left Behind Act (NCLB), entitled "Academic Assessment and Local Education Agency and School Improvement", the Office of the State Superintendent of Education (OSSE) of the District of Columbia oversees compliance with Adequate Yearly Progress (AYP). A large portion of meeting AYP is based on standardized-tests performance; the District used the summative assessment called the District of Columbia Comprehensive Assessment System ("DC CAS") through the 2013–2014 school year, after which it switched to tools from the Partnership for Assessment of Readiness for College and Careers (PARCC) and the National Center and State Collaborative (NCSC).

Many schools fail to meet AYP, even though DCPS educators offer support and tools to students to be academically successful. DCPS has created an evaluation tool to assess schools by more than their standardized test scores. They call this a Quality School Review, which uses the Effective Schools Framework to assess schools through rubrics on topics such as classroom observations, interviews with parents, students, teachers, and school leadership, staff surveys and reviewing artifacts (i.e., handbooks, student work). In 2007, Karin Hess of the National Center for the Improvement of Educational Assessment conducted an analysis that has also gone into the alignment of DCPS standards and the "DC CAS Alt", the assessment for students with cognitive disabilities.

== Budget ==
According to the U.S. Census Bureau, DCPS had a budget of $1.2 billion and spent $29,409 per pupil in FY 2009–10.

In 1989–90, DCPS reported spending $10,200 (1999 adj. dollars) per pupil. A decade later, in 1999–2000, its reported per-pupil expenditures had increased to $11,500. However, those figures likely underreport DCPS's actual total per-pupil expenditures. In 2012, the Cato Institute's Andrew J. Coulson showed that DCPS's reported per-pupil expenditures figures were based on incomplete data. That year, the U.S. Census Bureau had reported that DCPS's 2008–09 per-pupil expenditures were $18,181, but DCPS officials had neglected to include about $400 million in spending. Informed by Coulson's observations, the U.S. Census Bureau revised its data collection methods and reported that per-pupil expenditures were $28,170. Those revisions are reflected in the Bureau's 2009–10 reports.

In FY 2009–2010, the District received 6.7% of its total elementary and secondary education revenues from federal sources.

== Statistics ==
In 2008, in terms of testing 36% of students demonstrated proficiency in mathematics and 39% demonstrated proficiency in reading.

The average educator was paid $67,000 in 2010. A contract signed in 2010 was expected to raise that figure to $81,000 in 2012.

== List of schools ==
As of the 2025–2026 school year, DCPS consisted of 117 schools, out of a total of 245 schools in Washington, D.C. Most DCPS schools are "in-boundary" schools, meaning that students are eligible to enroll in them if their home address falls within certain boundaries. Students can participate in a lottery for a chance to enroll in out-of-boundary schools, selective high schools, alternative high schools, and citywide schools, as well as D.C. public charter schools outside of the DCPS system.

=== High schools ===
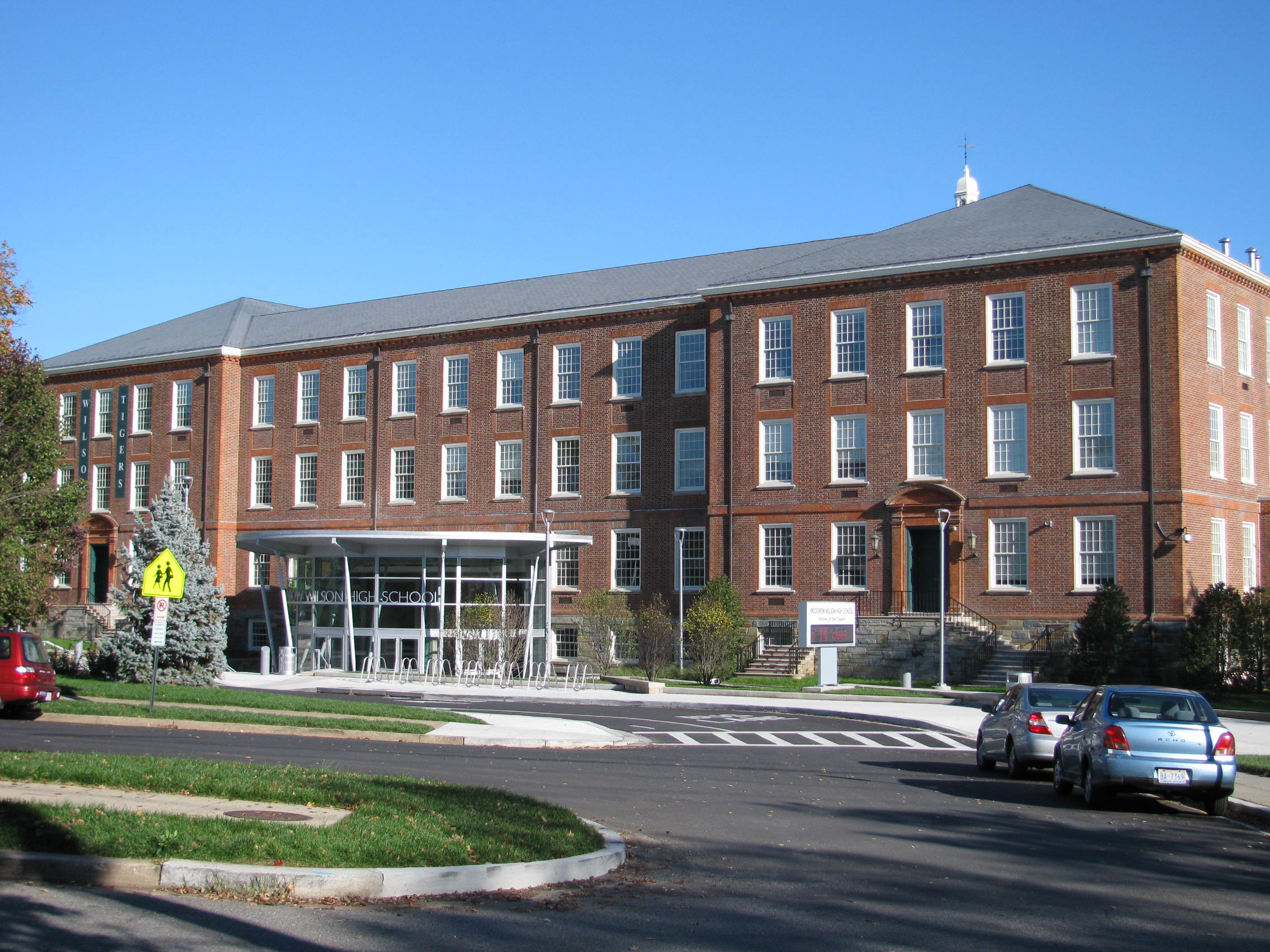
Jackson-Reed High School, in Tenleytown

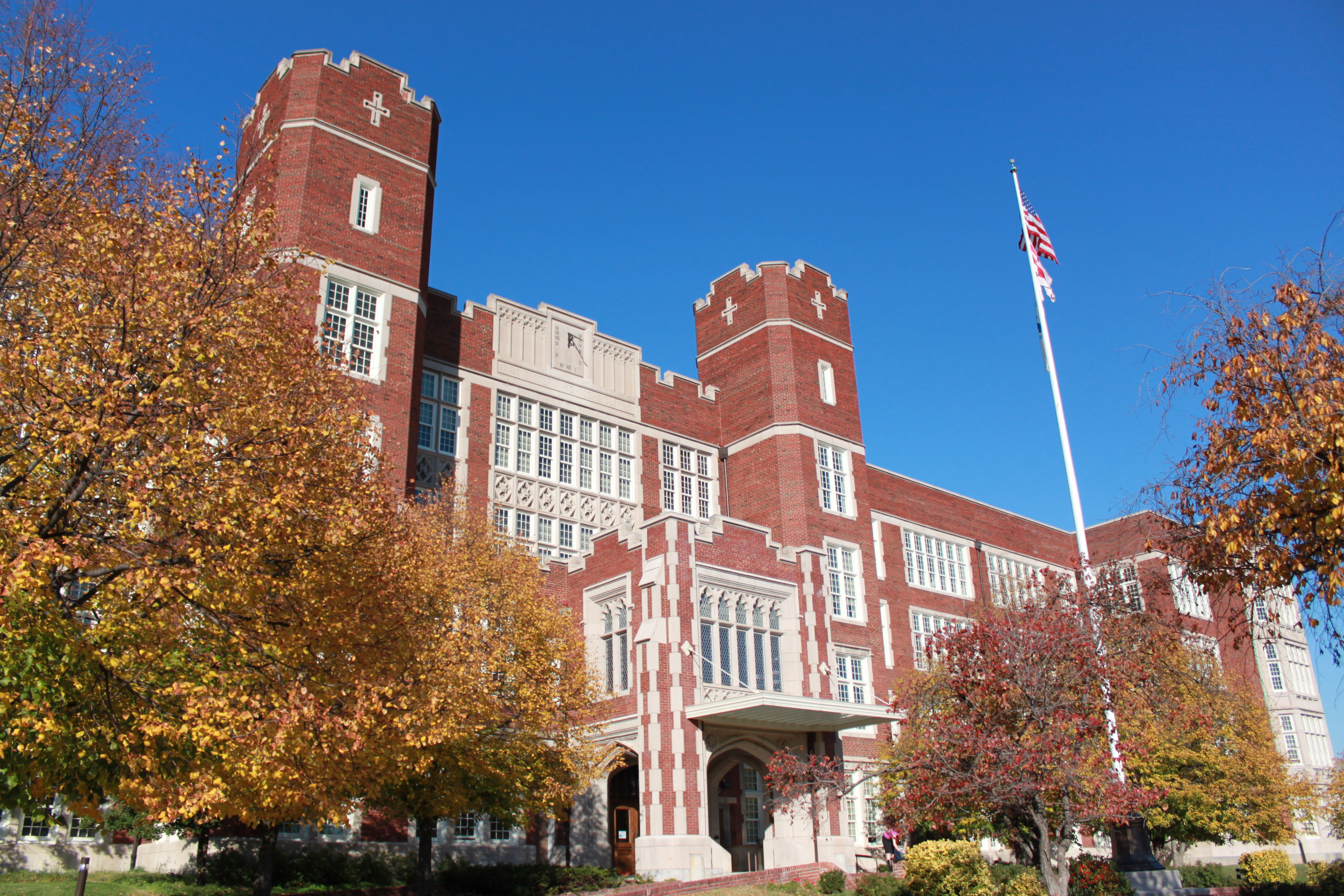
Eastern High School, in Hill East

==== Traditional high schools ====
School name	Students	Low grade	High grade
Anacostia High School	244	9th	12th
Ballou High School	585	9th	12th
Coolidge High School	1,093	9th	12th
Dunbar High School	984	9th	12th
Eastern High School	866	9th	12th
H.D. Woodson Senior High School	544	9th	12th
Jackson-Reed High School	1,994	9th	12th
MacArthur High School	238	9th	12th
Roosevelt High School	908	9th	12th

==== Selective high schools ====
School name	Students	Low grade	High grade
Bard High School Early College	369	9th	12th
Benjamin Banneker Academic High School	671	9th	12th
Duke Ellington School of the Arts	579	9th	12th
McKinley Technology High School	704	9th	12th
Phelps Architecture, Construction and Engineering High School	310	9th	12th
School Without Walls High School	599	9th	12th

==== Alternative high schools ====
School name	Students	Low grade	High grade
Ballou STAY High School	453	9th	Adult
Garnet-Patterson STAY High School	703	9th	Adult
Luke C. Moore High School	264	9th	12th

=== Middle schools ===
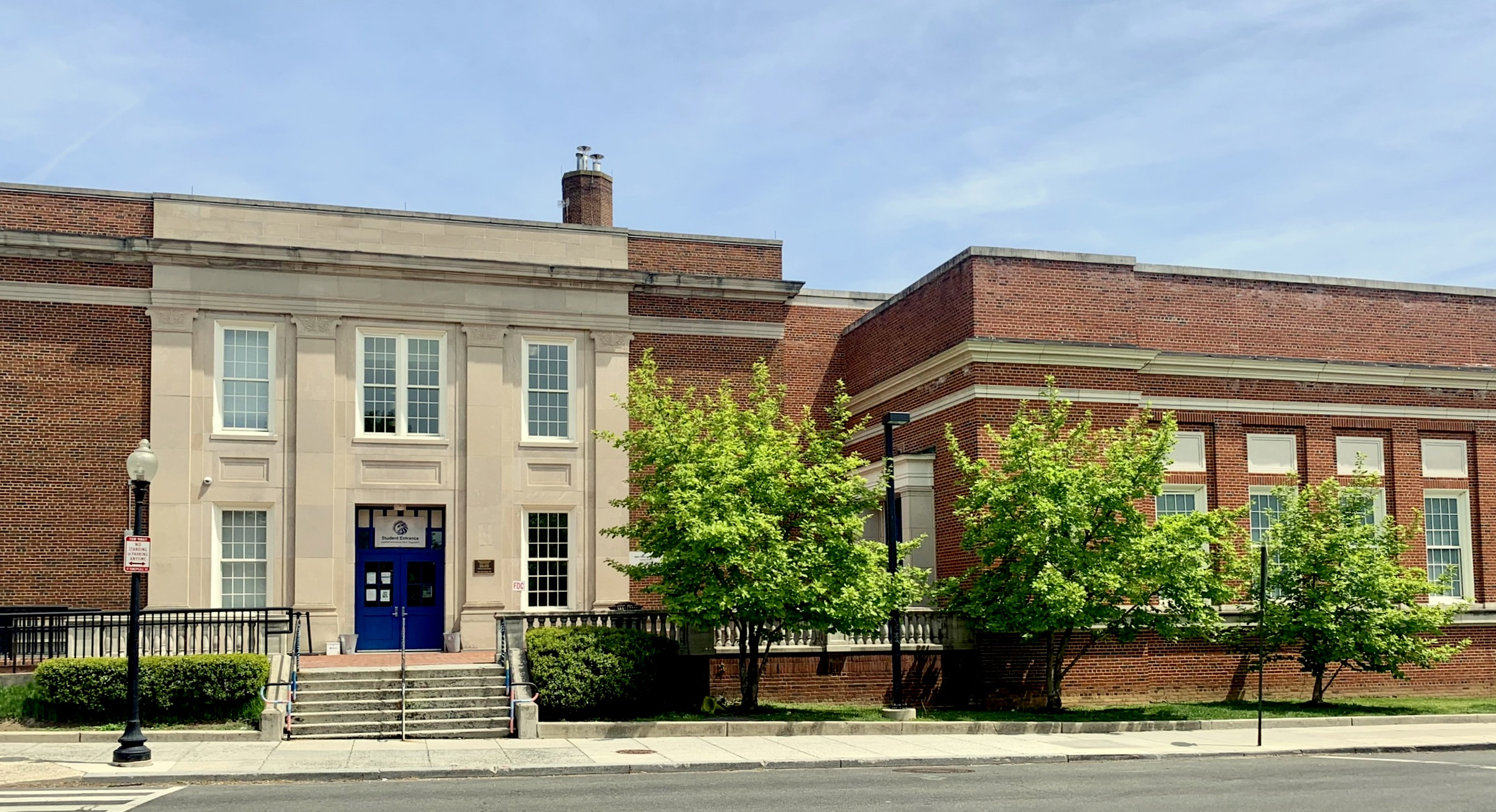
Hardy Middle School, in Georgetown

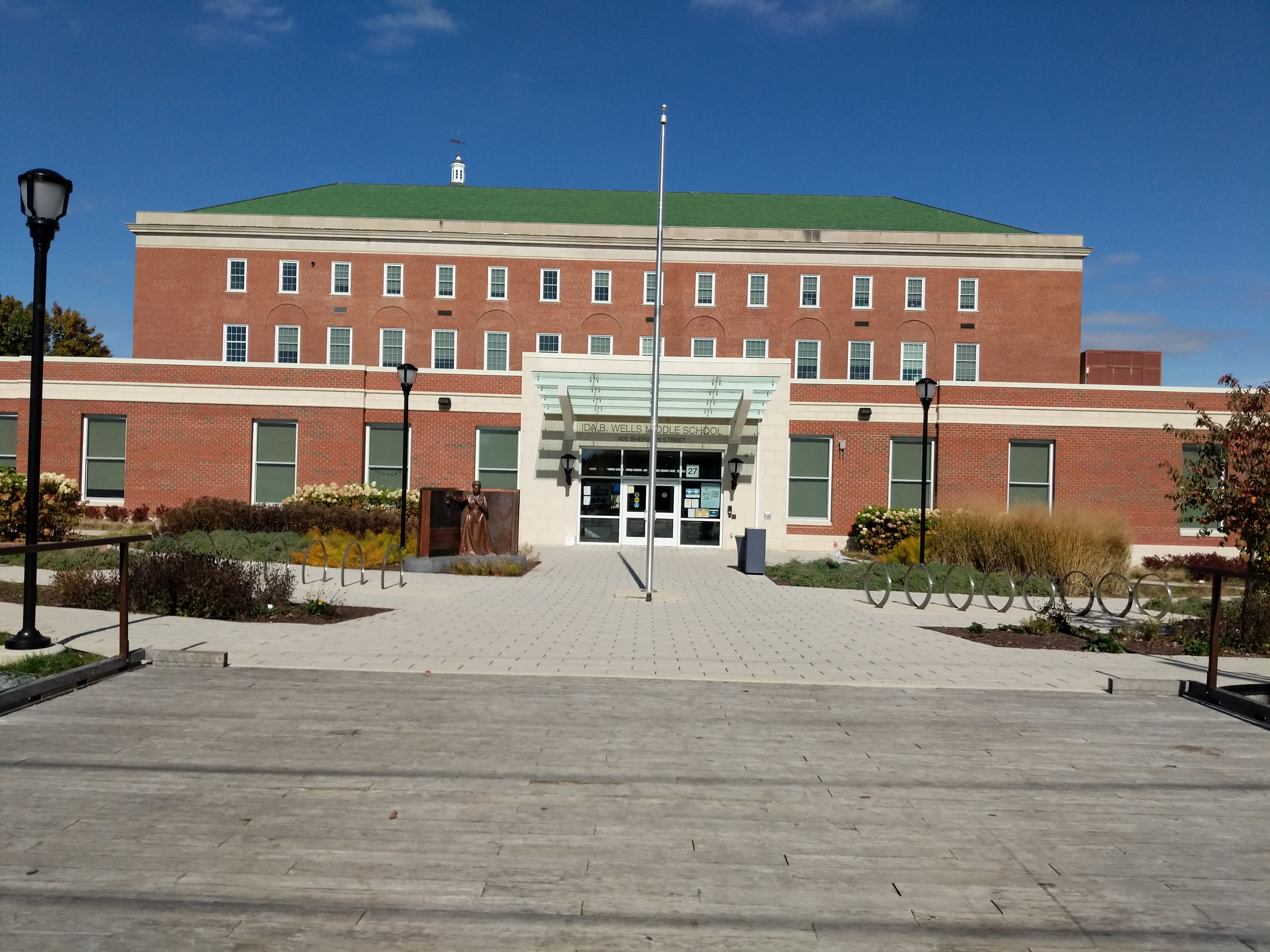
Ida B. Wells Middle School, near the Brightwood and Takoma neighborhoods

School name	Students	Low grade	High grade
Brookland Middle School	370	6th	8th
Deal Middle School	1,420	6th	8th
Eliot-Hine Middle School	374	6th	8th
Hardy Middle School	602	6th	8th
Hart Middle School	367	6th	8th
Ida B. Wells Middle School	540	6th	8th
Jefferson Middle School Academy	406	6th	8th
Johnson Middle School	297	6th	8th
Kelly Miller Middle School	289	6th	8th
Kramer Middle School	197	6th	8th
MacFarland Middle School	499	6th	8th
McKinley Middle School	263	6th	8th
Sousa Middle School	229	6th	8th
Stuart-Hobson Middle School	453	6th	8th

=== Elementary schools ===
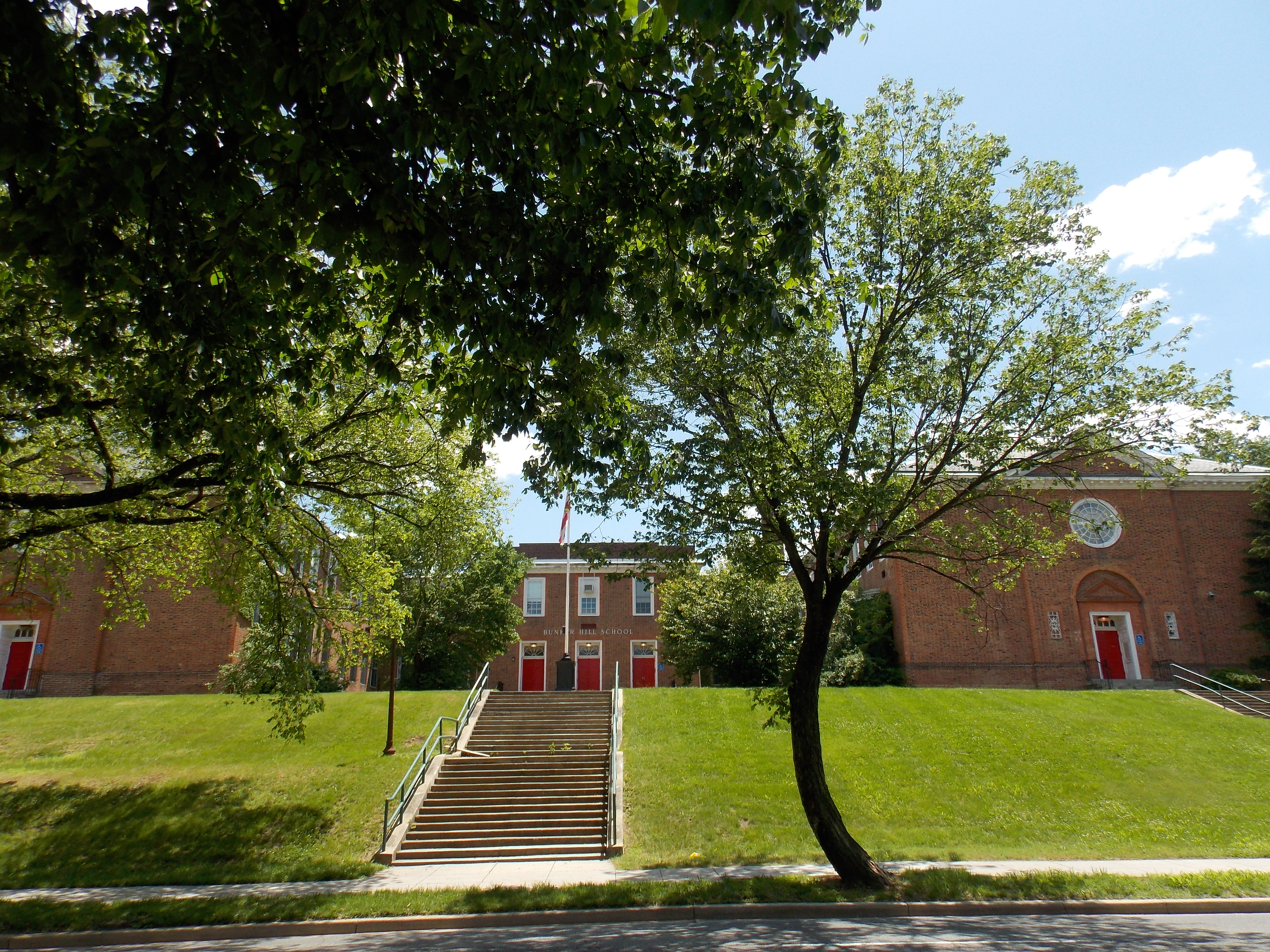
Bunker Hill Elementary School, near the Michigan Park and North Michigan Park neighborhoods

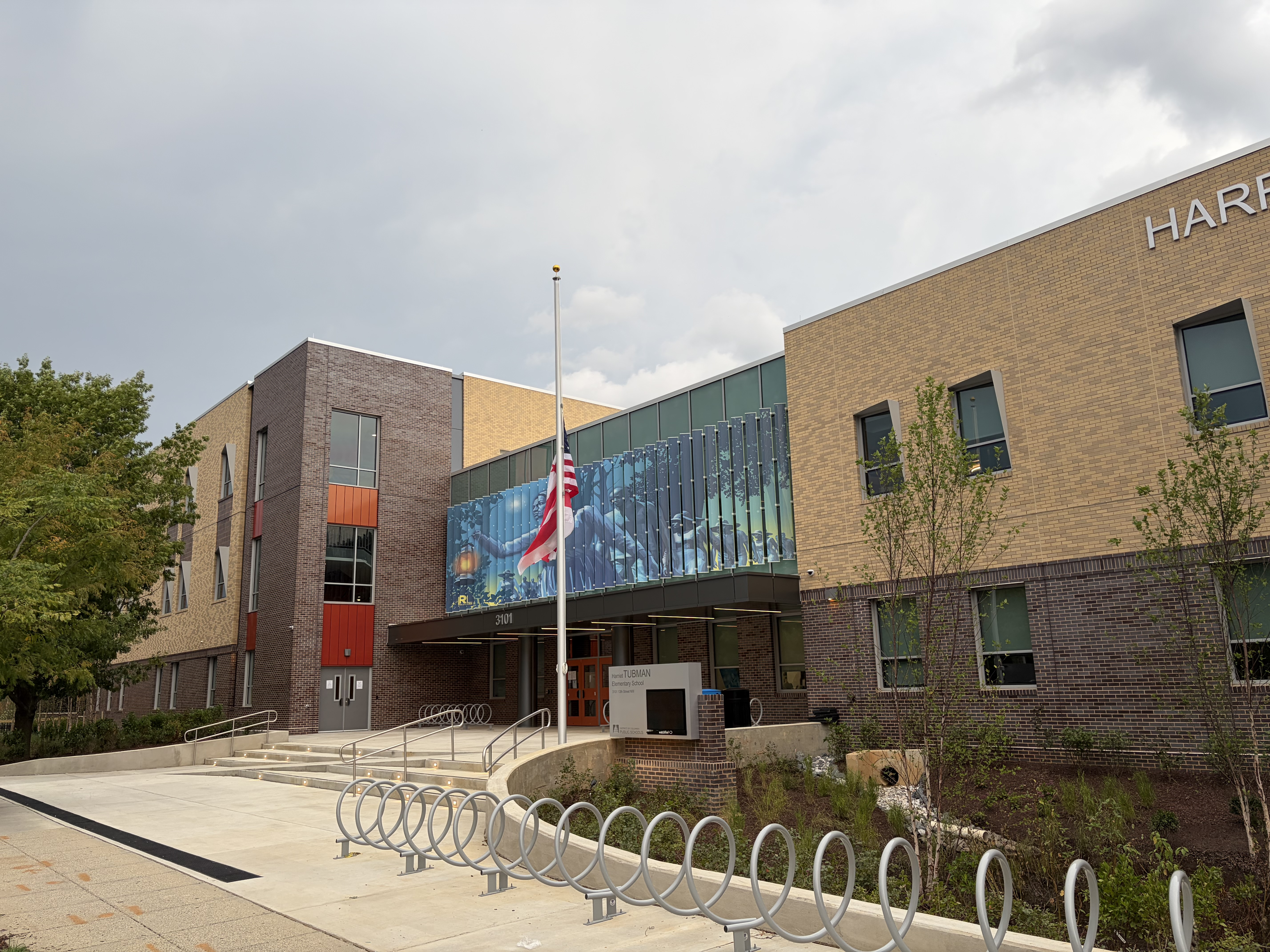
Tubman Elementary School, near the Columbia Heights and Mount Pleasant neighborhoods

School name	Students	Low grade	High grade
Amidon-Bowen Elementary School	365	PK (3)	5th
Bancroft Elementary School	768	PK (3)	5th
Barnard Elementary School	591	PK (3)	5th
Beers Elementary School	392	PK (3)	5th
Brent Elementary School	421	PK (3)	5th
Brightwood Elementary School	603	PK (3)	5th
Bruce-Monroe Elementary School at Park View	436	PK (3)	5th
Bunker Hill Elementary School	206	PK (3)	5th
Burroughs Elementary School	297	PK (3)	5th
Burrville Elementary School	236	PK (3)	5th
C.W. Harris Elementary School	261	PK (3)	5th
Cleveland Elementary School	299	PK (3)	5th
Drew Elementary School	189	PK (3)	5th
Eaton Elementary School	473	PK (4)	5th
Garfield Elementary School	202	PK (3)	5th
Garrison Elementary School	389	PK (3)	5th
H.D. Cooke Elementary School	389	PK (3)	5th
Hearst Elementary School	337	PK (4)	5th
Hendley Elementary School	251	PK (3)	5th
Houston Elementary School	307	PK (3)	5th
Hyde-Addison Elementary School	396	PK (3)	5th
J.O. Wilson Elementary School	464	PK (3)	5th
Janney Elementary School	684	PK (4)	5th
John Lewis Elementary School	493	PK (3)	5th
Ketcham Elementary School	250	PK (3)	5th
Key Elementary School	347	PK (4)	5th
Kimball Elementary School	374	PK (3)	5th
King Elementary School	202	PK (3)	5th
Lafayette Elementary School	933	PK (4)	5th
Langdon Elementary School	389	PK (3)	5th
Langley Elementary School	348	PK (3)	5th
LaSalle-Backus Elementary School	261	PK (3)	5th
Lawrence E. Boone Elementary School	436	PK (3)	5th
Lorraine H. Whitlock Elementary School	146	PK (3)	5th
Ludlow-Taylor Elementary School	488	PK (3)	5th
Malcolm X Elementary School	200	PK (3)	5th
Mann Elementary School	394	PK (4)	5th
Marie Reed Elementary School	452	PK (3)	5th
Maury Elementary School	549	PK (3)	5th
Miner Elementary School	410	PK (3)	5th
Moten Elementary School	238	PK (3)	5th
Murch Elementary School	636	PK (4)	5th
Nalle Elementary School	307	PK (3)	5th
Noyes Elementary School	288	PK (3)	5th
Patterson Elementary School	253	PK (3)	5th
Payne Elementary School	376	PK (3)	5th
Peabody Elementary School	215	PK (3)	K
Plummer Elementary School	224	PK (3)	5th
Powell Elementary School	497	PK (3)	5th
Randle Highlands Elementary	300	PK (3)	5th
Raymond Elementary School	400	PK (3)	5th
Ross Elementary School	182	PK (3)	5th
Savoy Elementary School	199	PK (3)	5th
Seaton Elementary School	377	PK (3)	5th
Shepherd Elementary School	363	PK (3)	5th
Shirley Chisholm Elementary School	565	PK (3)	5th
Simon Elementary School	207	PK (3)	5th
Smothers Elementary School	232	PK (3)	5th
Stanton Elementary School	306	PK (3)	5th
Stoddert Elementary School	447	PK (4)	5th
Takoma Elementary School	483	PK (3)	5th
Thomas Elementary School	275	PK (3)	5th
Thomson Elementary School	253	PK (3)	5th
Truesdell Elementary School	384	PK (3)	5th
Tubman Elementary School	560	PK (3)	5th
Turner Elementary School	452	PK (3)	5th
Van Ness Elementary School	392	PK (3)	5th
Watkins Elementary School	397	1st	5th
Whittier Elementary School	413	PK (3)	5th

=== Education campuses ===
School name	Students	Low grade	High grade
Browne Education Campus	442	PK (3)	8th
Cardozo Education Campus	706	7th	12th
Columbia Heights Education Campus	1,494	6th	12th
John Francis Education Campus	529	PK (3)	8th
Leckie Education Campus	458	PK (3)	8th
Oyster-Adams Bilingual School	781	PK (4)	8th
River Terrace Education Campus (Note: River Terrace Education Campus is a special education school.)	120	3rd	Adult
Walker-Jones Education Campus	313	PK (3)	8th
Wheatley Education Campus	361	PK (3)	8th

=== Citywide schools ===
School name	Students	Low grade	High grade
Capitol Hill Montessori School @ Logan	488	PK (3)	8th
Dorothy I. Height Elementary School	396	PK (3)	5th
Excel Academy	339	PK (3)	8th
Military Road Early Learning Center	67	PK (3)	PK (4)
Ron Brown College Preparatory High School (Note: Ron Brown College Preparatory High School is an all-male school.)	161	9th	11th
School-Within-School @ Goding	325	PK (3)	5th
Thaddeus Stevens Early Learning Center	86	PK (3)	PK (4)

== Leaders ==
Below is a partial list of superintendents, and chancellors of the D.C. Public School system. The head of the school system was known as "Superintendent" until June 2007, when the post was renamed "Chancellor".

Leader	In office	Acting or interim	Sources
Hugh J. Scott	September 1, 1970 – June 29, 1973		
Floretta D. McKenzie		June 29, 1973 – August 7, 1973 (acting)	
Barbara A. Sizemore	August 8, 1973 – October 9, 1975		
Vincent E. Reed	March 18, 1976 – December 31, 1980	October 9, 1975 – March 17, 1976 (acting)	
James Guinness		January 3, 1981 – June 17, 1981 (acting)	
Floretta D. McKenzie	July 1, 1981 – February 8, 1988		
Andrew E. Jenkins	May 25, 1988 – May 15, 1991	February 9, 1988 – May 24, 1988 (acting)	
Franklin L. Smith	May 15, 1991 – November 4, 1996		
Julius W. Becton Jr.	November 5, 1996 – March 26, 1998		
Arlene Ackerman	March 27, 1998 – July 17, 2000		
Paul L. Vance	July 18, 2000 – November 14, 2003		
Elfreda W. Massie		November 19, 2003 – April 21, 2004 (acting)	
Robert C. Rice		April 22, 2004 – September 14, 2004 (acting)	
Clifford B. Janey	September 15, 2004 – June 12, 2007		
Michelle Rhee	July 10, 2007 – October 30, 2010	June 12, 2007 – July 9, 2007 (acting)	
Kaya Henderson	June 22, 2011 – September 30, 2016	November 1, 2010 – June 21, 2011 (interim)	
John Davis		October 1, 2016 to February 1, 2017 (interim)	
Antwan Wilson	February 1, 2017 – February 20, 2018		
Amanda Alexander		February 20, 2018 – December 3, 2018 (interim)	
Lewis Ferebee	March 5, 2019 – present	December 3, 2018 – March 4, 2019 (acting)	

== See also ==
- List of parochial and private schools in Washington, D.C.
- Susan E. W. Fuller, artist, first instructor of art in the District's public schools
- Bolling v. Sharpe, 347 U.S. 497 (1954); landmark U.S. Supreme Court decision that held school segregation in the District of Columbia Public Schools to be unconstitutional
