= Parkview =

Parkview may refer to:

== Geography ==
- Parkview, Indiana, an unincorporated community in Vigo County
- Parkview, St. Louis, Missouri, a neighborhood of St. Louis, Missouri, United States
- Parkview (Edmonton), a neighborhood in Canada
- Parkview, Gauteng, a suburb of Johannesburg, South Africa
- Parkview, New South Wales, a suburb in Australia
- O'Connor-Parkview, a neighbourhood near Toronto, Canada
- Hong Kong Parkview, a private housing estate in Tai Tam, Hong Kong

== Schools and districts ==
- Parkview High School (Georgia), a public high school in Lilburn, Georgia
- Parkview High School (Springfield, Missouri), a public high school in Springfield, Missouri
- Parkview High School (Wisconsin), a public secondary school in village of Orfordville, Wisconsin
- Parkview Arts and Science Magnet High School, a magnet school in Little Rock, Arkansas
- Parkview Community College of Technology, a secondary school in Barrow-in-Furness, Cumbria, England
- Parkview School District, a school district serving areas of Rock County, Wisconsin, United States
- Parkview School (Edmonton), a school in the Parkview community of Edmonton, Alberta, Canada.
- Parkview Christian School, a Christian school in Yorkville, IL

== Other meanings ==
- Parkview Health, a community health system in Indiana
- UCHealth Parkview Medical Center, a hospital in Pueblo, Colorado
- Parkview Square, an office building in Singapore
- Parkview (SEPTA station), an interurban rapid transit station in Upper Darby Township, Pennsylvania

== See also ==
- Park View (disambiguation)
