= Parkview High School =

Parkview High School may refer to:

- Parkview High School (Lilburn, Georgia), United States
- Parkview High School (Springfield, Missouri), United States
- Parkview High School (Orfordville, Wisconsin), United States
- Parkview Arts and Science Magnet High School, Little Rock, Arkansas, United States
- Parkview Community College of Technology, Barrow-in-Furness, Cumbria, England
- Parkview School (Dundee), Dundee, Scotland
- Parkview School (Edmonton), Edmonton, Alberta, Canada
