= Princess Theatre (Edmonton) =

Cinema in Alberta, Canada

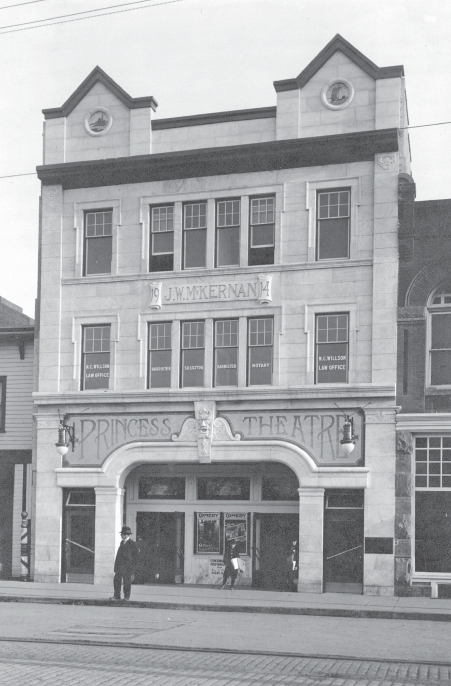
- Princess Theatre in 1915, shortly after opening
- Interactive map of Princess Theatre
- Address: 10337 Whyte Avenue; Edmonton; Canada
- Coordinates: 53.5178°N 113.4964°W
- Capacity: Princess: 422; Princess II: 100
- Designation: Provincial Historic Resource

Construction
- Years active: 1915–1958, 1971–2022
- Architects: Wilson and Herrald, Edmonton Alberta

Website
- www.princesstheatre.ca

The Princess Theatre is a two-screen art-house cinema at 10337 Whyte Avenue in Edmonton's historic Old Strathcona neighbourhood. The building was designed by prominent Edmonton architects Wilson and Herrald, a firm responsible for the design of many other Edmonton heritage sites. It became Edmonton's oldest surviving theatre after the demolition of the Gem Theatre in 2006. The building currently houses the main 400-seat theatre as well as the 100-seat Princess II, in the basement.

It was originally known as the McKernan Block, after John W. McKernan, the building's original financier, owner, and manager.

The building and the theatre within has changed ownership several times, and its fortunes have largely depended on the state of the Canadian theatre industry at the time. It spent a dozen years as a retail space from 1958 to 1970, and six years from 1970 to 1976 mainly exhibiting mainstream pornographic films. The Princess was operated successfully as a repertory theatre from 1978 to late 1996, after which it became a first run theatre. Until 2016, the Princess was operated as a first run theatre by Edmonton's native Magic Lantern Theatres. Beginning in January 2016, the cinema was operated by Plaza Entertainment.

The Princess Theatre closed in October 2020 in response as a result of the effect of COVID-19 restrictions on theatre attendance. The building was listed for sale in 2022.

== Silent era ==
=== Early years under J.W. McKernan ===
Early days of operation

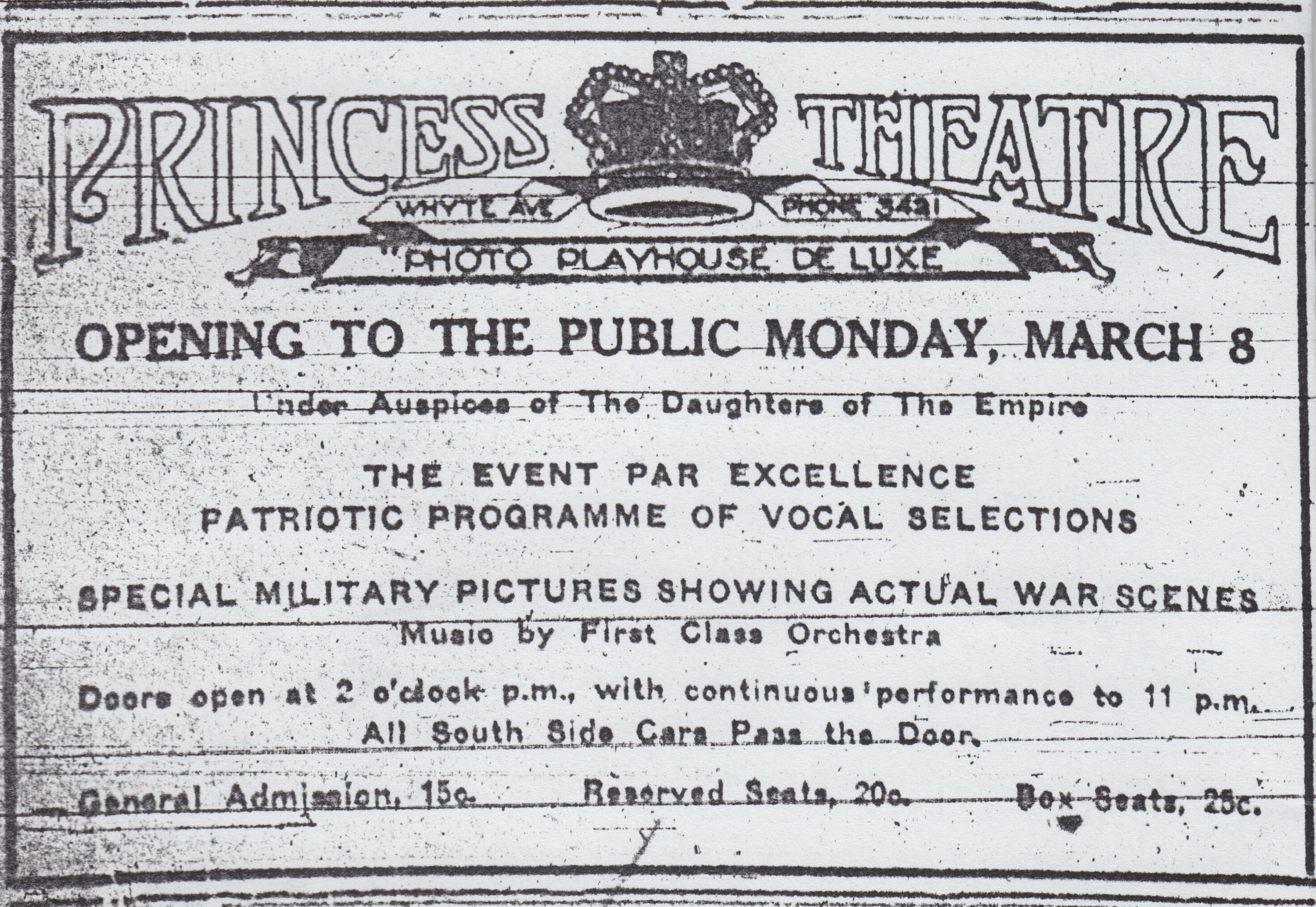
The Princess's first program benefited the war effort

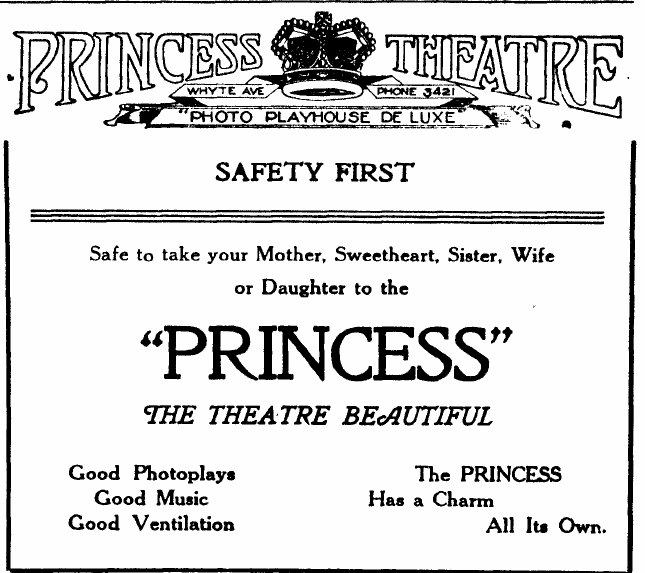
Good ventilation was an attraction

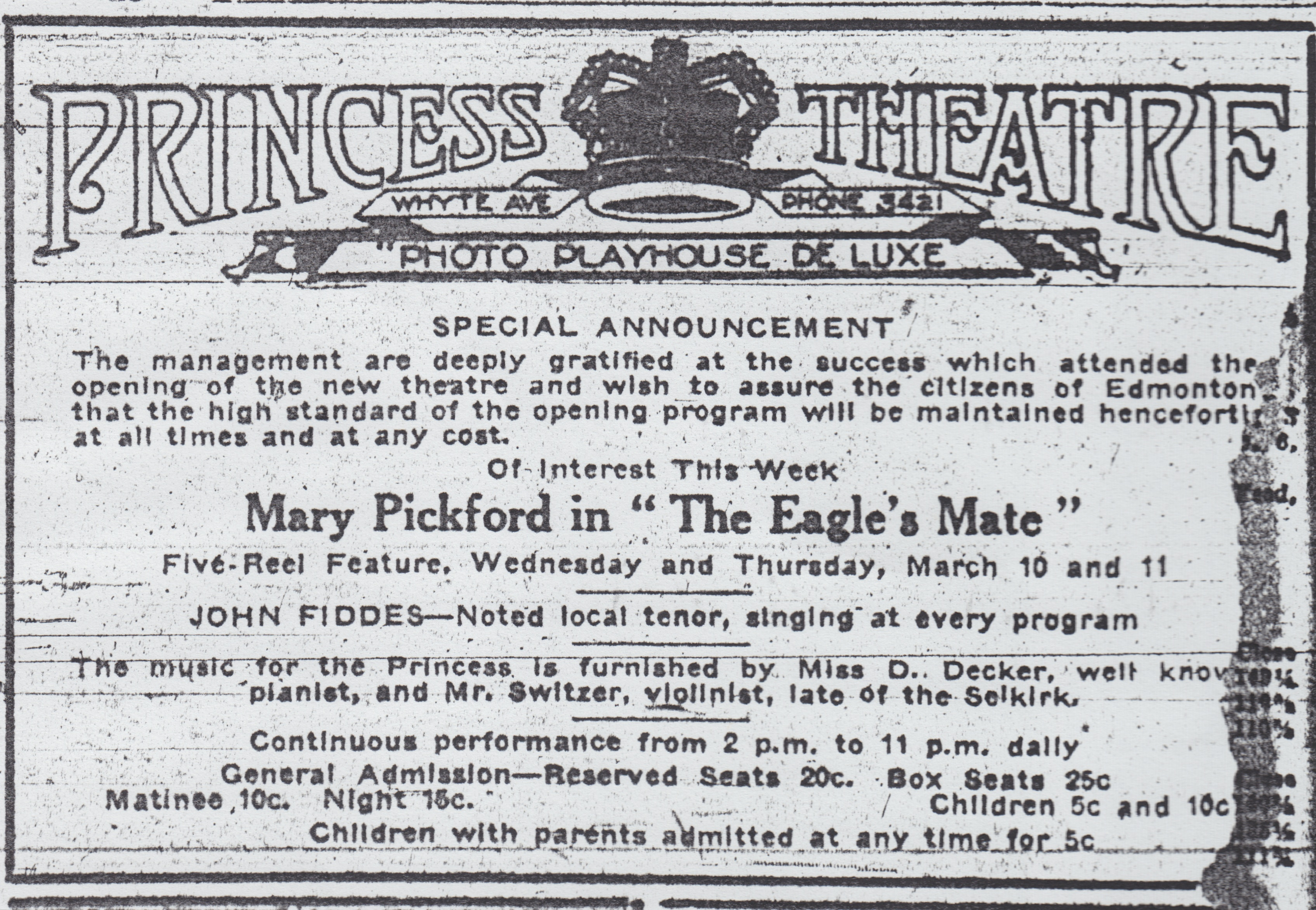
The theatre's first full feature starred Mary Pickford

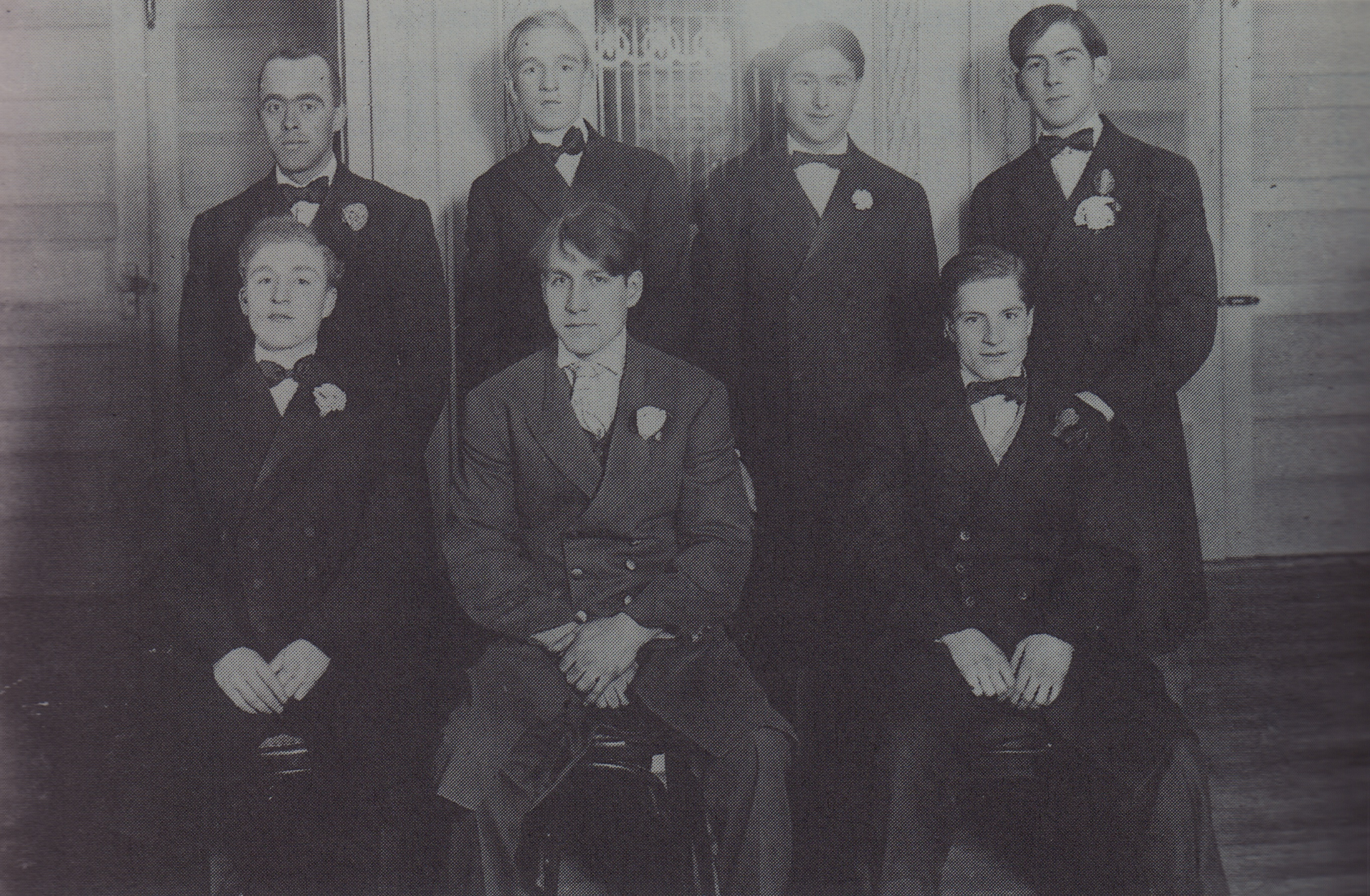
Six of the theatre's original ushers dressed up for opening night, 1915

The Princess Block, was designed by Edmonton architects Wilson and Herrald, who also designed Whyte Avenue's Douglas Block, the Strathcona Fire Hall, the Strathcona Public Library, and the University of Alberta's Rutherford House. From the beginning, the building was designed to combine commercial and residential space, and featured a full basement, small multi-use second floor apartments, and a full third floor in addition to the theatre space.

The building was originally known as the McKernan Block, after John W. McKernan, the Princess's owner and manager until his death in 1919. The McKernans were a family of property developers in boomtown Strathcona; John's father developed and ran the historically important Dominion Hotel, also on Whyte Avenue. For his part, J.W. McKernan is considered an important trailblazer in Edmonton entertainment. He was already a recognized theatre operator having previously run a succession of other south side theatres before the Princess: the Gem, the Alhambra, and the South Side Bijou / Bijou Strathcona.

The Princess Theatre opened as a single-screen cinema on March 8, 1915, to rave reviews. It had cost McKernan CA$75,000 and had taken 10 months to build, longer than expected. The theatre opened with 660 seats and the largest live performance stage in a cinema west of Winnipeg. Its competitors, the Ross Hall theatre and the Strand Theatre also on Whyte Avenue, soon succumbed to the economic recession that set in during WWI, and the Princess became the only cinema on Edmonton's southside, the Garneau Theatre not opening until 1940. Opening night was a benefit concert for the Imperial Order Daughters of the Empire, associated with the 19th Alberta Dragoons, B Squadron. The program proudly included newsreels "featuring actual war scenes". In audience were the Lieutenant-Governor G.H.V. Bulyea and Mayor W.T. Henry. The house's first feature film, The Eagle's Mate starring Mary Pickford, was screened the following night.

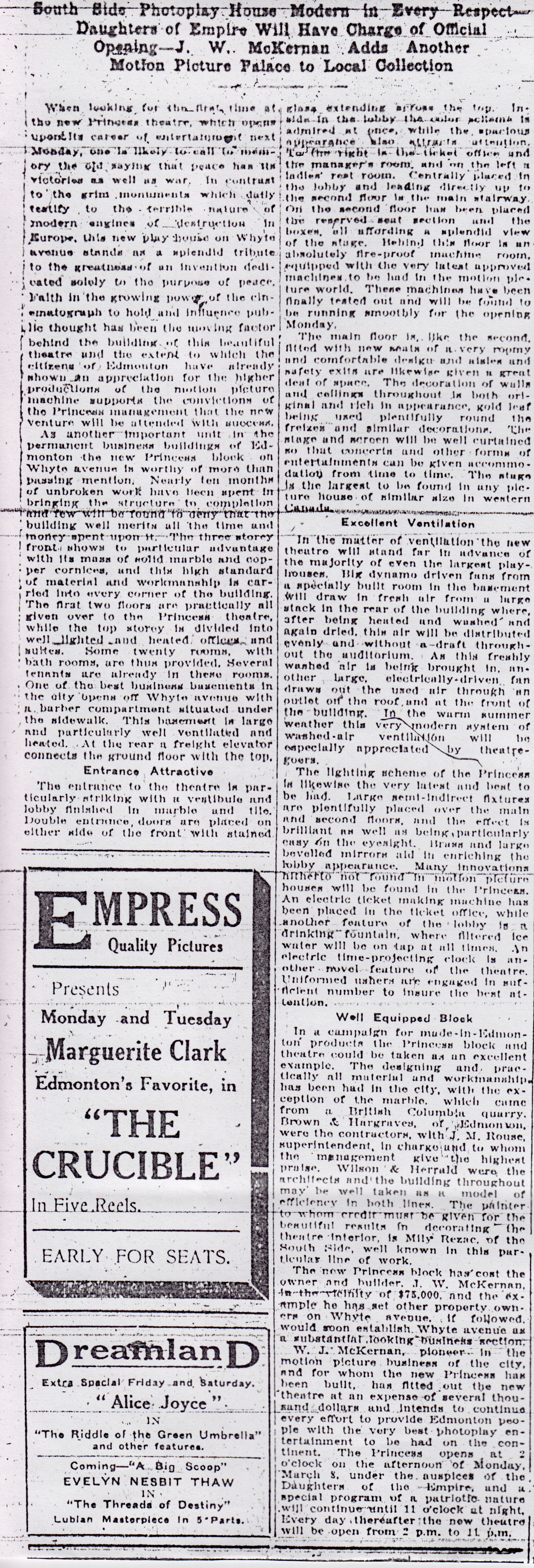
The building's quality was impressive

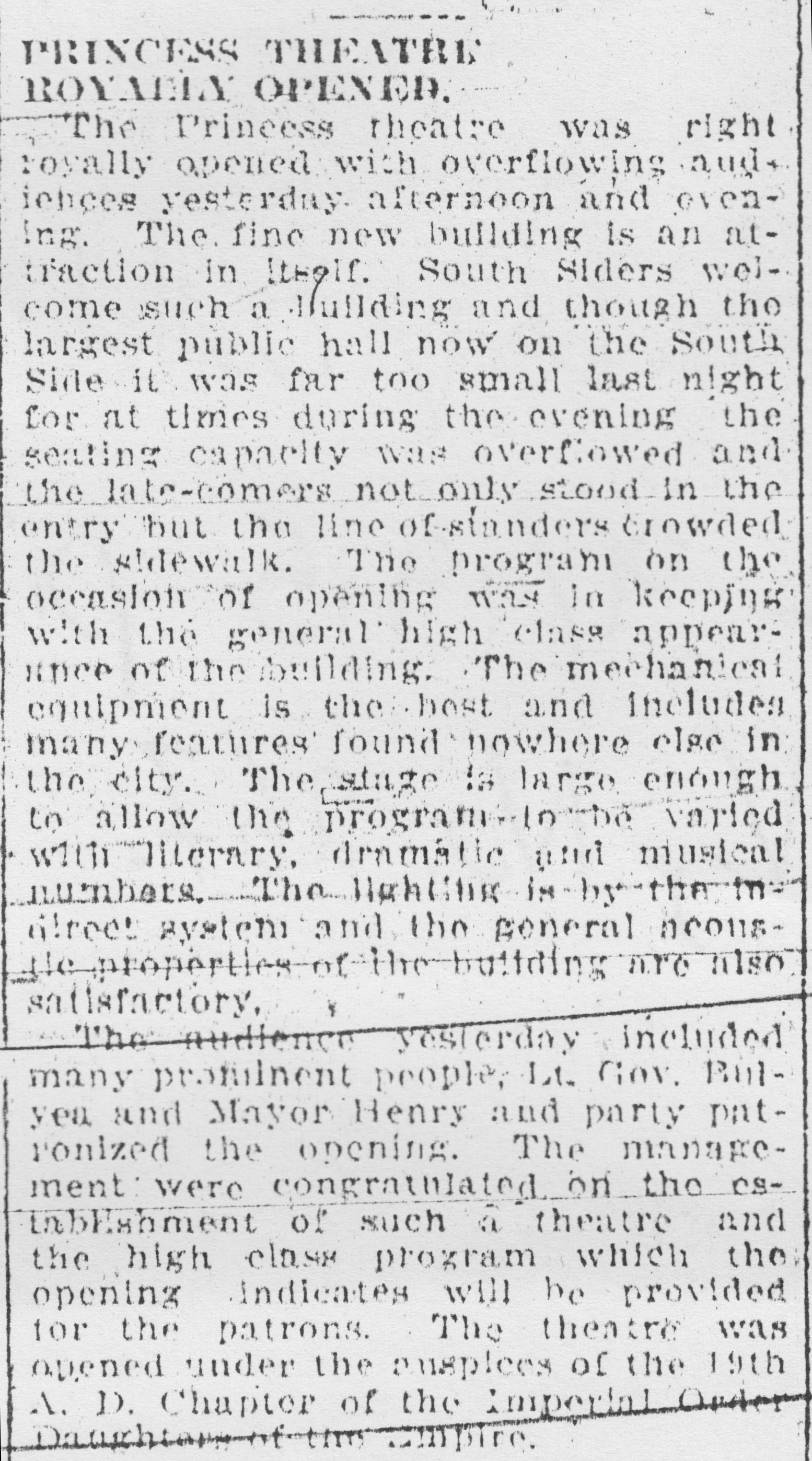
Opening night was a great success

At the time, the Princess was considered a showpiece of elegance and modernity. It was the first building west of Winnipeg to be faced with marble. The Edmonton Journal remarked on the quality of the "photoplay house's" finishings, remarking on the solid marble facade, frescoes, brass mirrors and the abundance of gold leaf decoration. On the technical side, two modern projectors were housed in their own fireproof machine room. The Princess was serviced by a freight elevator, which was an unusual feature for a building of its size, and the theatre lighting was indirect and gentle on theatregoers' eyes. The Journal was also impressed by three novel firsts for a movie theatre in Edmonton: an electric ticketing machine, an "electric time-projecting clock", and a refrigerated drinking fountain. Perhaps most importantly, the forced air ventilation system was capable of filtering, heating, and cooling air and featured dedicated intake and output fans making the Princess by far the most comfortable theatre in Edmonton.

By 1916, the Princess had stopped booking live acts and was focusing exclusively on the more profitable cinema side of the business. Revenues from the rental spaces in the basement and upper floors had also begun to flow in. Notably, Hugh Morrow, a beat cop, had leased apartment 205. His granddaughter Susan Morrow would manage the Princess from 1981 to 1994.

Wartime proved hard on the film business. On September 23, 1915, Famous Players informed McKernan that "On account of the boat Hesperian having been torpedoed by a German submarine, it will be necessary to skip two Weeklies (short films), these having come forward to ourselves from our London representative via this boat. Regretting this occurrence, and trusting you will appreciate our position on this...". McKernan's supply of new films was decreased as the war dragged on, and McKernan advertised less and less frequently. Further complicating things, parts for the theatre's Edison and Simplex projectors were difficult to come by at the best of times, and the complex machines proved difficult to maintain. McKernan did not live to see business pick up. He contracted Spanish Influenza and pneumonia in rapid succession, and died on February 18, 1919.

=== Alexander Entwisle ===
The McKernan family leased the theatre to Alexander Entwisle sometime in 1919. Entwisle managed a chain of Edmonton vaudeville houses and cinemas on Jasper Avenue including the Pantages, Empress and Dreamland Theatres.

Around 1919 the basement was first leased to a pool hall, "Dad's Billiard Room". While this business was not present in 1920, the basement would house a pool hall continuously from 1927 into the 1970s.

== Arrival of the sound era ==
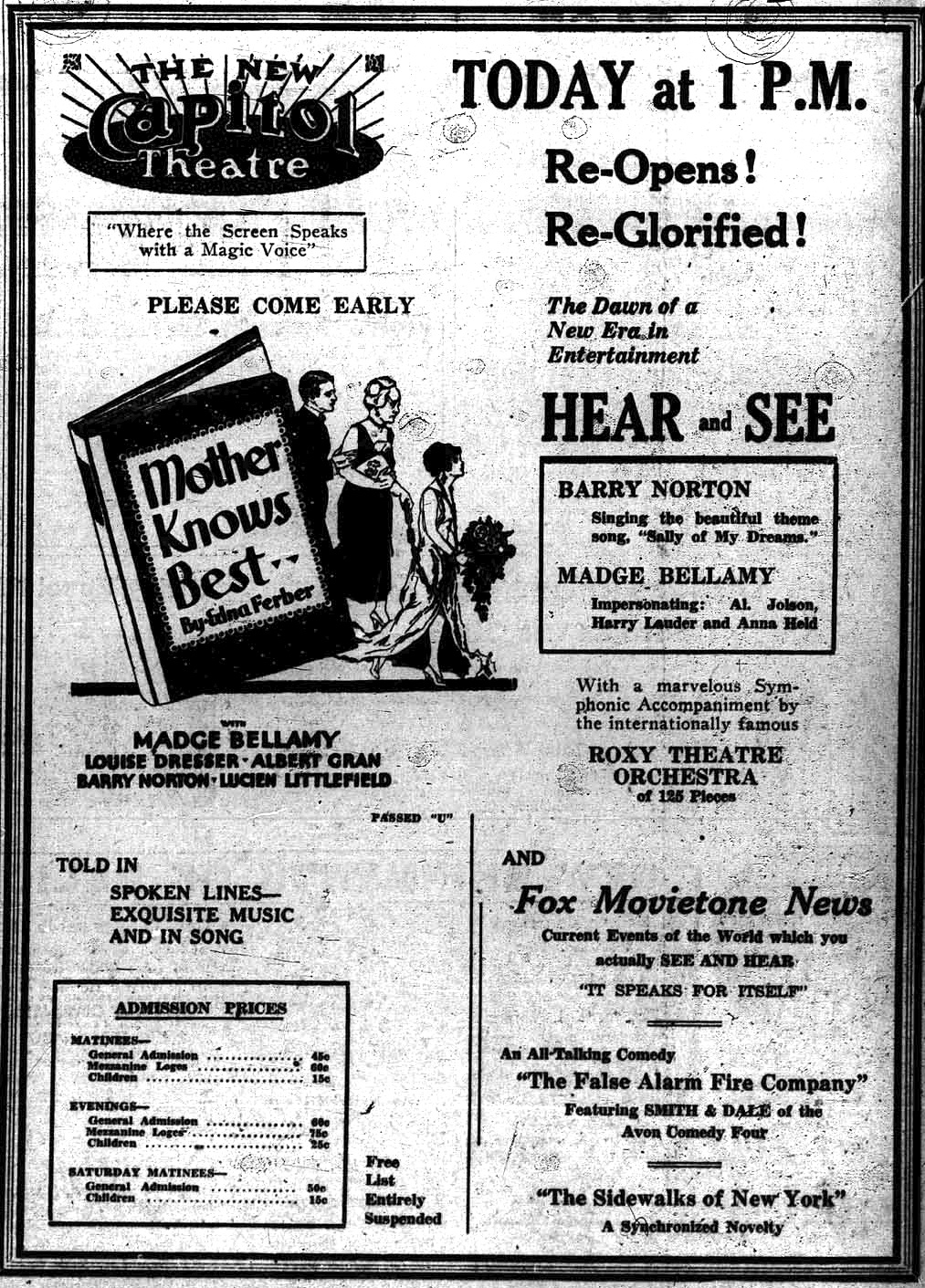
The Capitol showed the first talkie in Edmonton, March 27, 1929.

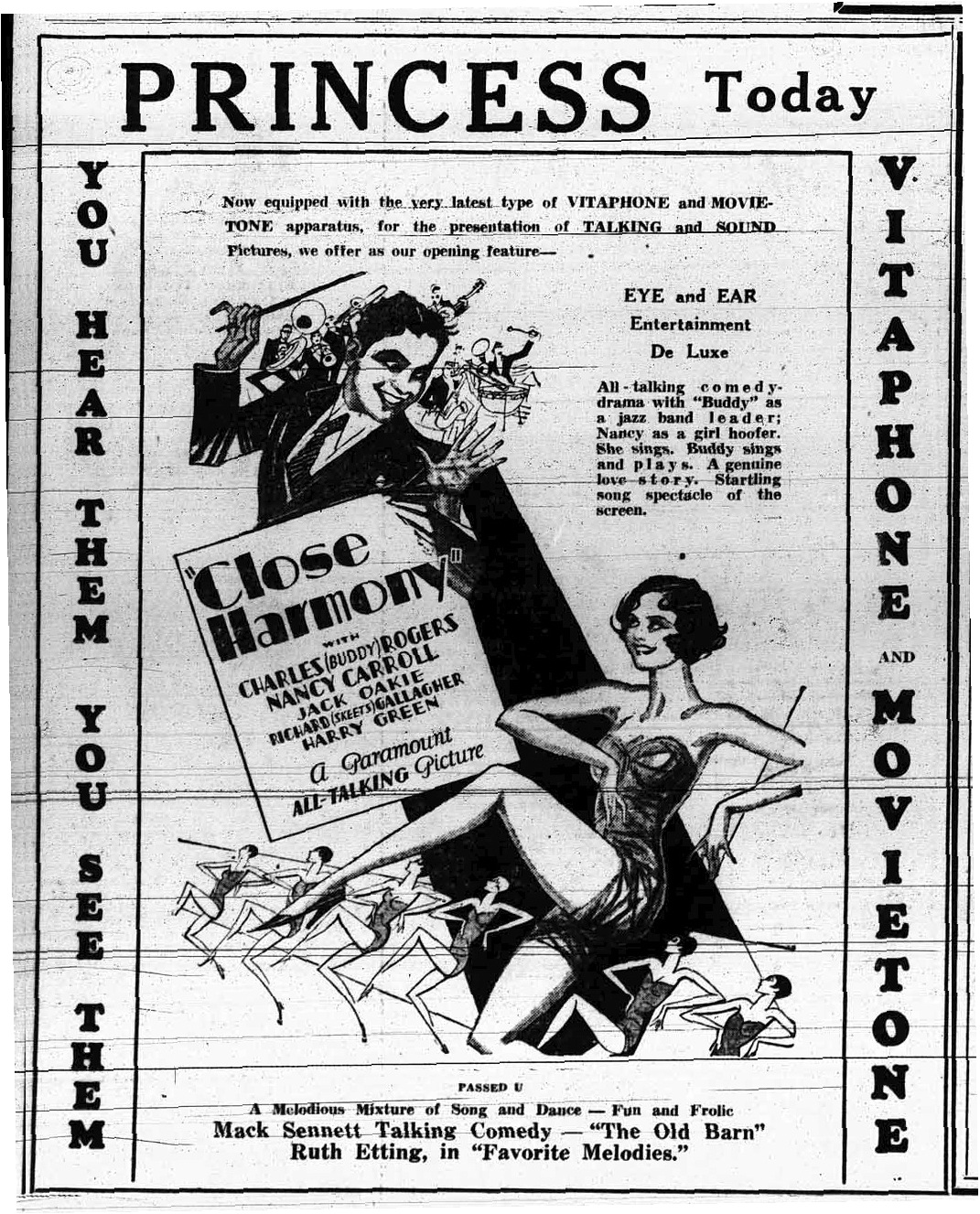
The Princess's first talkie was Close Harmony, as advertised in the August 19, 1929 Edmonton Bulletin.

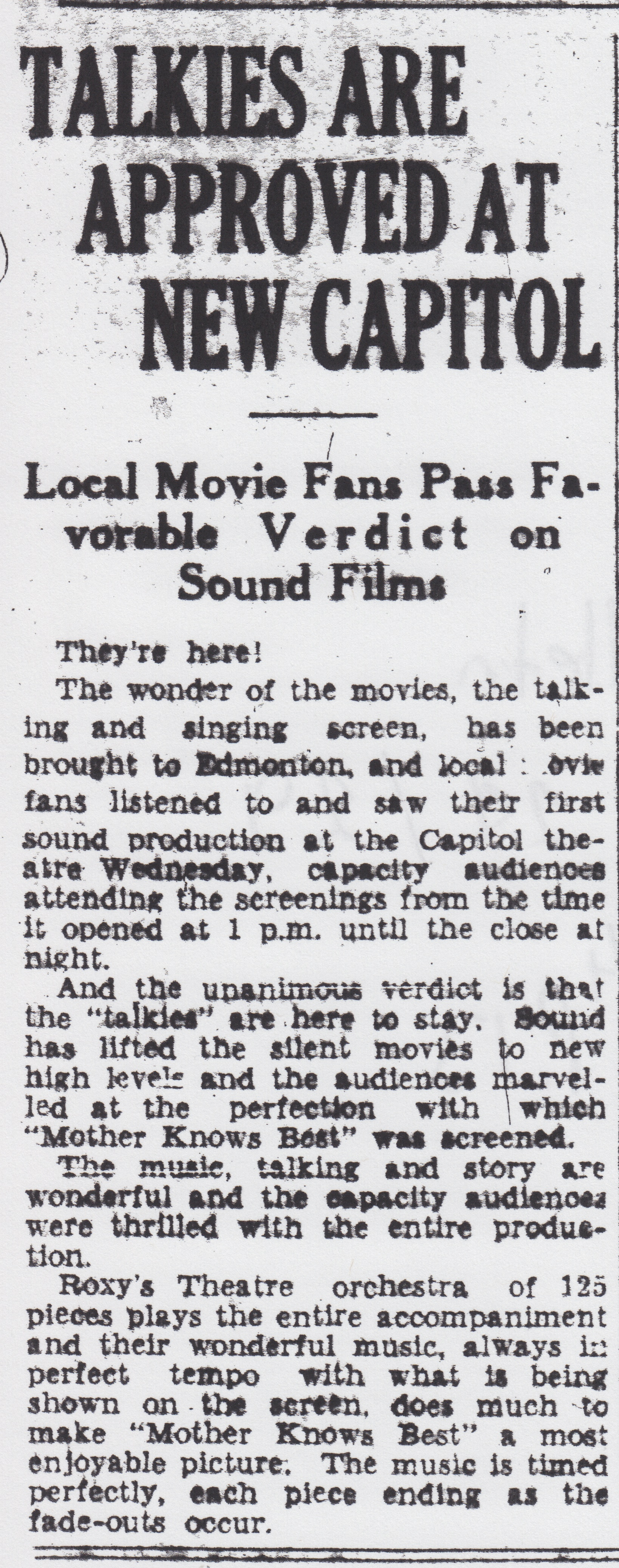
The talkies were a big hit in 1929

In 1929, talkies arrived in Edmonton. Electronically indexed articles from the Edmonton Journal have exposed an error published in several local histories. They claim the first talkie screened in Edmonton was The Canary Murder Case, and that it was screened at the Princess. In fact, the first talkie in Edmonton was Mother Knows Best, screened at the Capitol, a major Jasper Avenue competitor to the Princess.

The talkies were very well received and hugely successful. Other theatres were pressured to modernize their equipment or close.

Sound installation was completed at the Princess by August 16. An entire page of the Edmonton Bulletin was devoted to the reopening, including a congratulating ad from a local record store, an ad for the electrical contractors who installed the wiring, and a message congratulating the Princess placed by the managers of three other establishments already wired for sound: the Rialto, Empress and Capitol Theatres. The physical renovations necessary to accommodate the new wiring were carried out by S. H. Muttart, an important local builder and namesake of the Muttart Conservatory in Edmonton's River Valley.

The first talkie screened at the Princess was Close Harmony starring Buddy Rogers and Nancy Carroll, on August 19, 1929.

== Theatre closes ==
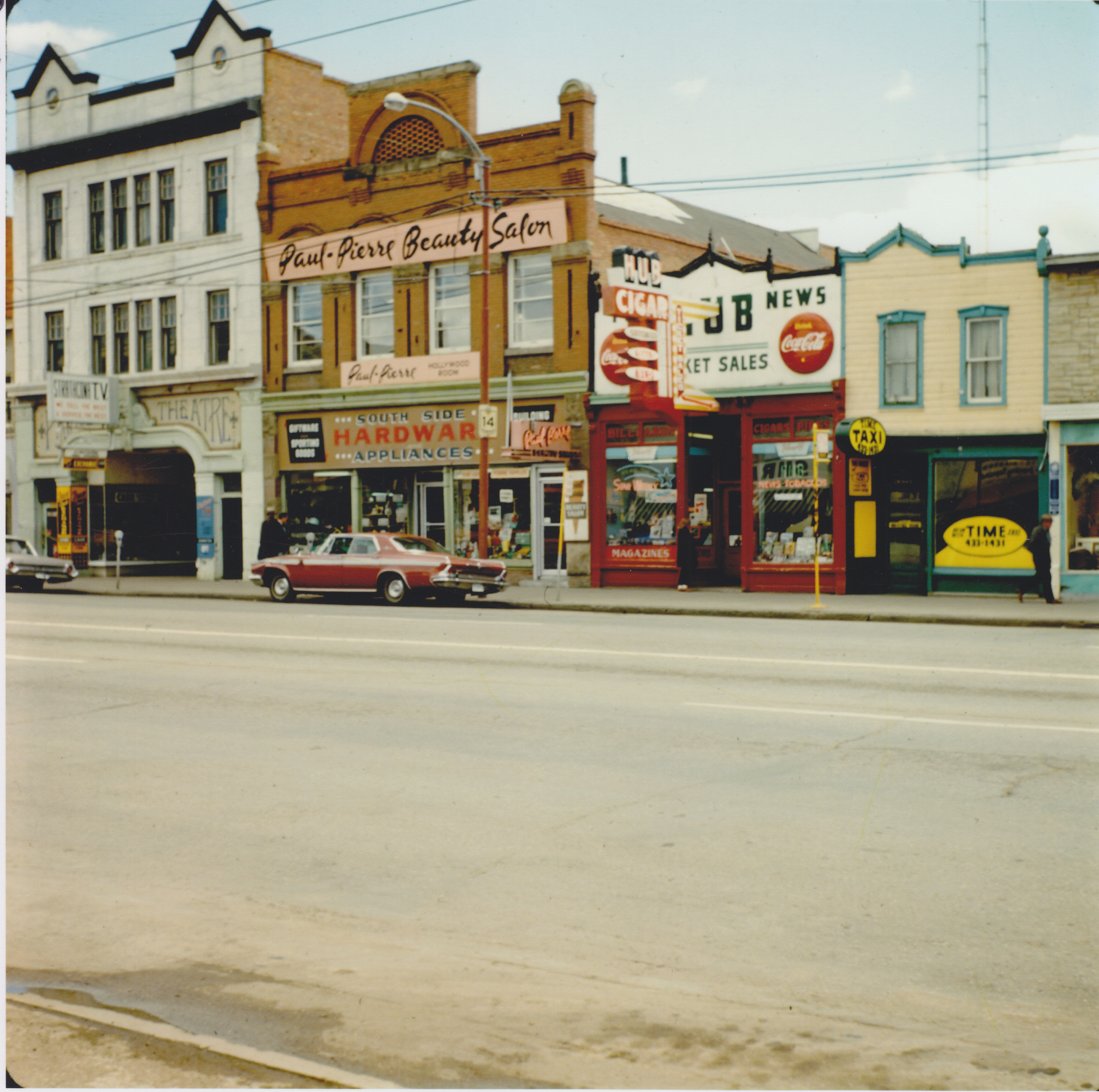
Theatre exterior, 1966

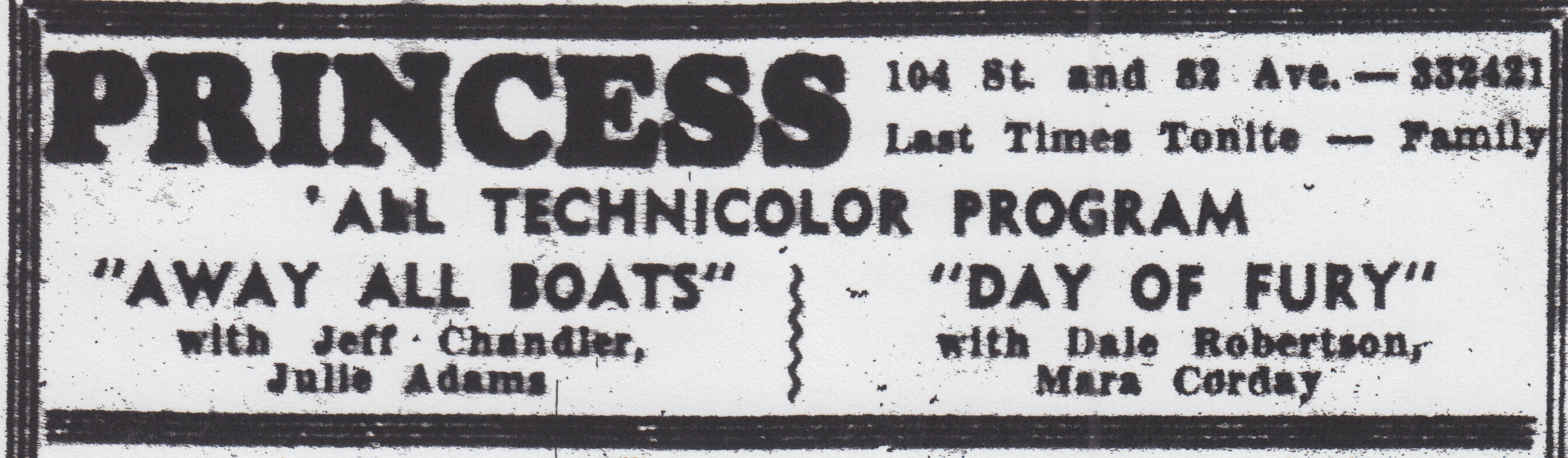
Last ad placed before closing in 1958

The arrival of television was a disruptive force for Edmonton's cinemas. The theatre was forced to close in 1958, and the McKernan family sold the Princess Block soon after. The Princess's last advertisement ran on July 19, 1958, advertising a double bill, Away All Boats and Day of Fury. There were no showtimes, articles or editorials printed in the following days.

The Princess Block disappeared from Henderson's Directory, a local city directory, in 1956, implying that its researchers thought it was completely vacant. The building was re-included in 1960, but the theatre's former address at 10337 Whyte Avenue remained vacant and unlisted for another six years. By 1966, the exterior doors had been removed entirely to create storefronts (see photo), and the theatre itself had been occupied by Quick Cash Exchange, a pawnshop. The third floor was split into several apartments, while the second floor was entirely occupied by Strathcona TV and Columbia Photo Studio. The basement was still a pool hall, Princess Billiards.

== Klondike Theatre ==
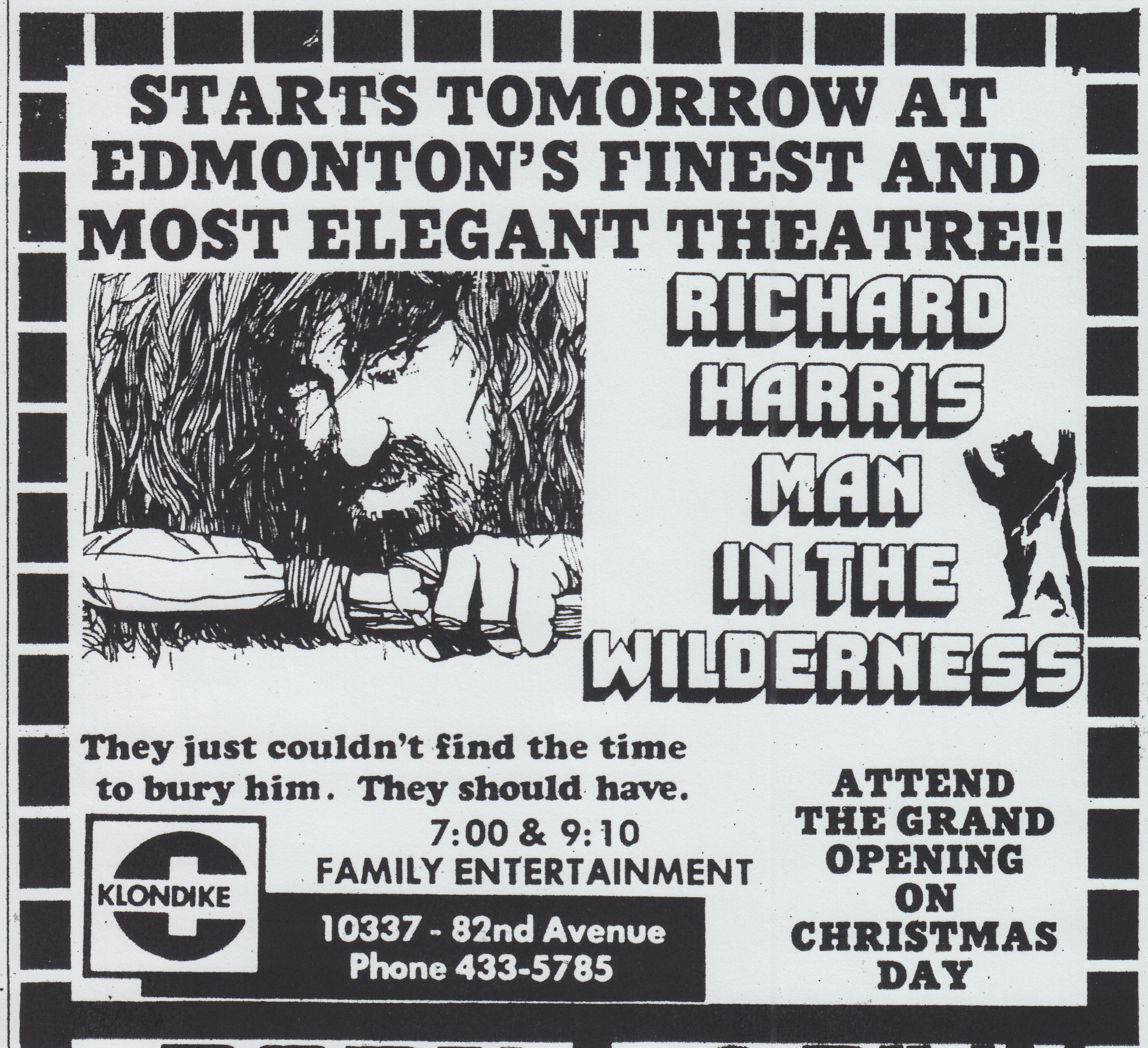
The Klondike opened on Christmas Day, 1971 showing Man in the Wilderness starring Richard Harris

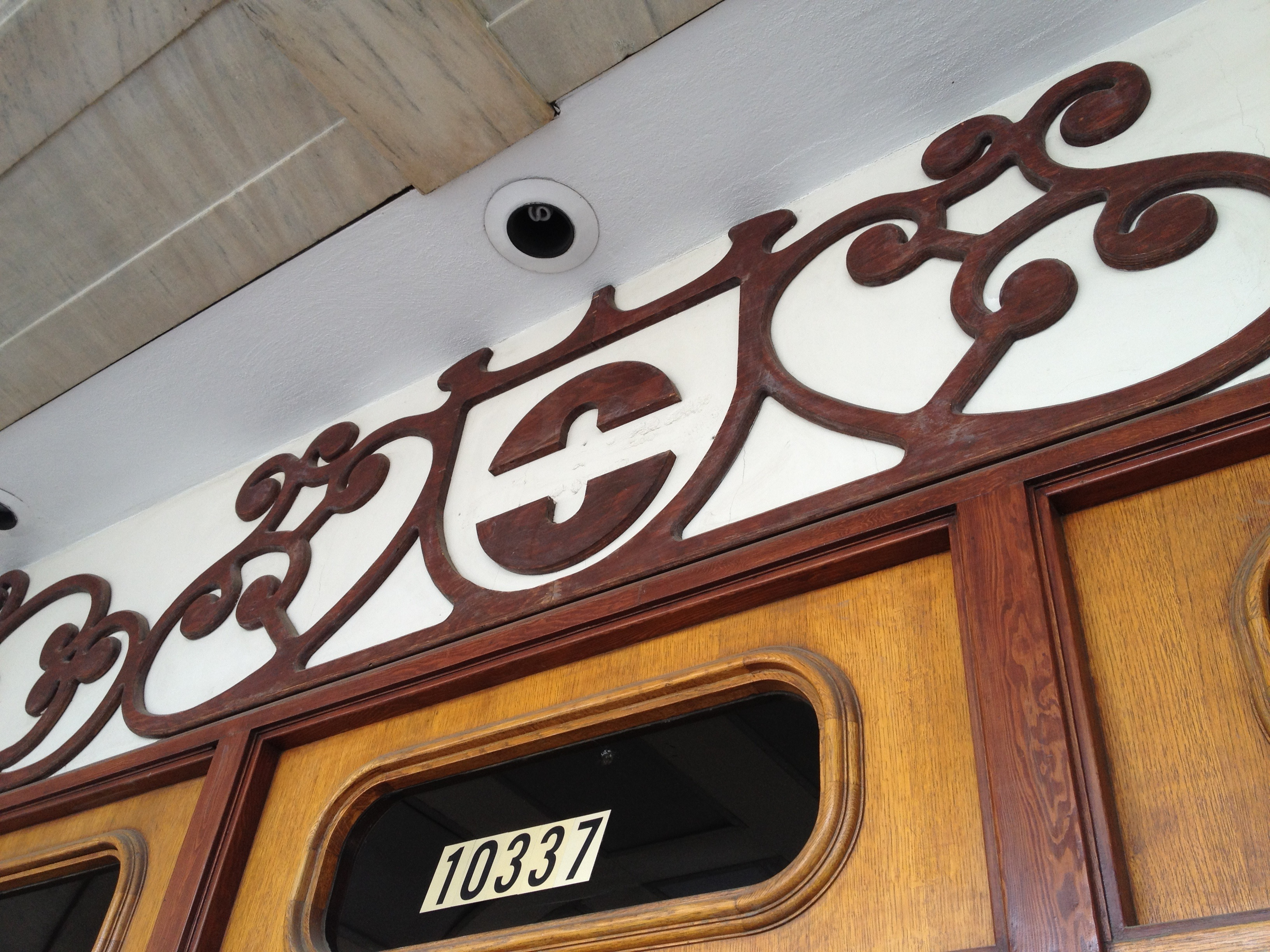
Towne Cinema renovated the Princess in 1971. Their logo is still hidden in the scrollwork below the marquee

Towne Cinema Limited bought the Princess outright sometime in 1970. The chain owned several theatres in Alberta, including the Towne Cinema on 118 Avenue. The theatre reopened on Christmas Day 1971 as the Klondike Theatre after almost a year of renovations. Towne Cinema restored the original function of the interior of the building, rebuilt sections of the exterior, and installed a new marquee at a cost of $270,000. Its first film was Man in the Wilderness, a family friendly feature starring Richard Harris.

But at some point in 1972, family friendly programming began being interspersed with (and was eventually replaced by) "blue movies", such as Swedish Fly Girls. The chain would come to be known for its generally risque material. In 1981, prints of both Caligula and Dracula Sucks were confiscated from multiple Towne locations, and the company was sued by the Government of Alberta under obscenity laws.

The Klondike's choice of programming earned it a negative reputation, and Towne Cinema was unable to run the Klondike profitably. The company sought buyers for the theatre as early as 1976, asking $600,000. But, despite all of the theatre's problems under Towne Cinema, it is unlikely that it would have been returned to its original use without the money they poured into its renovation. Their efforts to restore the building are a significant reason why the Princess is a cinema today.

== Old Strathcona Foundation ==
The Old Strathcona Foundation, at that time a publicly funded community development initiative, leased the struggling Klondike in 1977 and began searching for ways to use the space. A member of the general public, Frank Grisdale, answered the solicitation, writing a paper outlining how the building could be successfully operated as a repertory theatre under its original name. The foundation was apparently impressed by his proposal, and Grisdale was installed as the Princess Theatre's director upon completion of renovations in 1978.

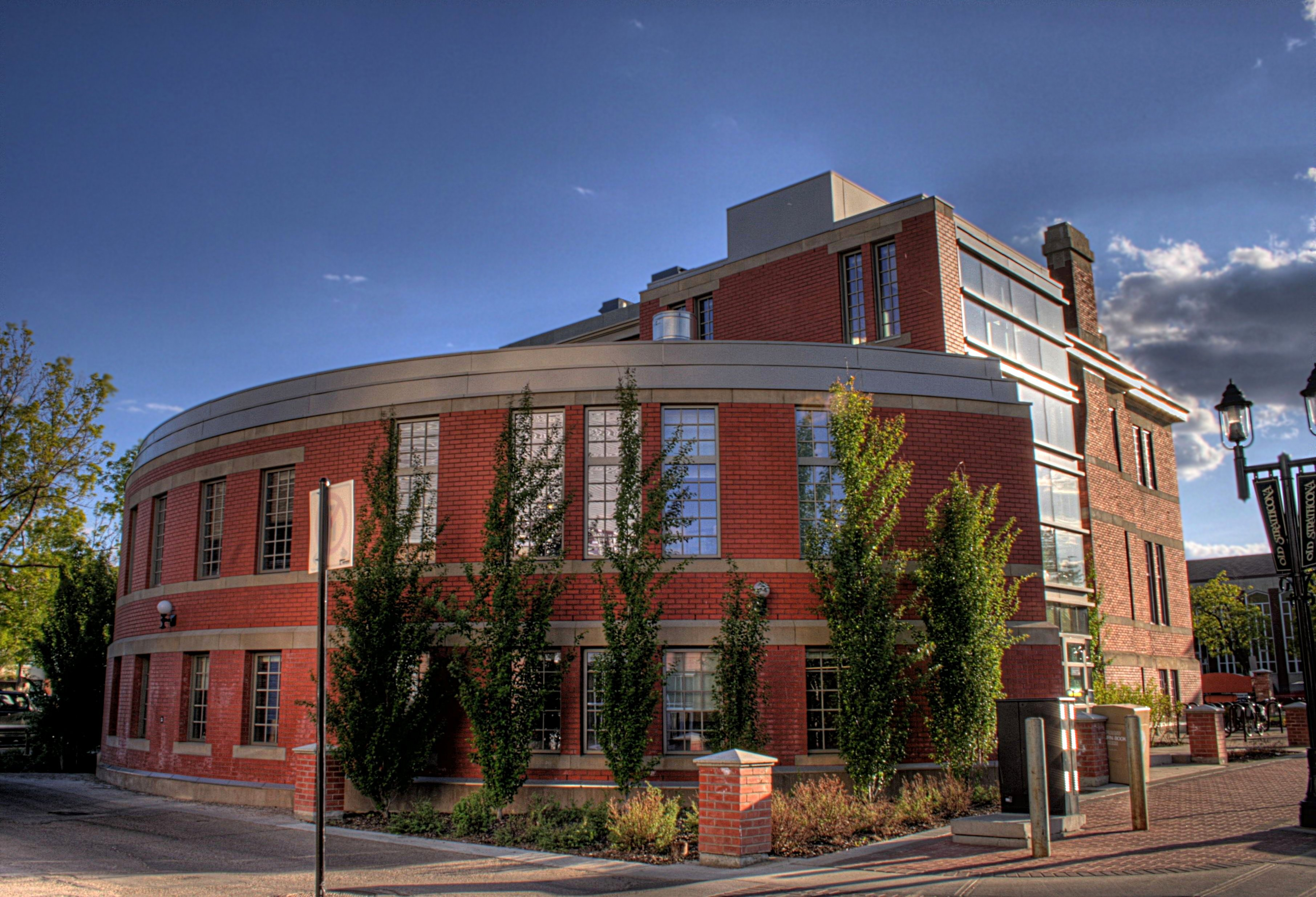
The Old Strathcona Foundation's offices were in the Strathcona Public Library until the mid-1990s

The theatre was profitable by its second year, and earned the Old Strathcona Foundation $1 million between 1979 and 1989. This was in no small part due to Grisdale's vision of a repertory film house dedicated to championing the independent film genre. During his tenure, Grisdale also introduced live performances, including touring acts such as Sneezy Water's "Hank Williams - The Show He Never Gave". After firmly establishing the Princess as a significant alternative arts establishment in Edmonton, Frank Grisdale resigned and Susan Morrow became the manager in 1981. Morrow expanded the theatre's program to a glossy monthly magazine. The theatre was offering Saturday morning cartoons, student pricing, and yearly memberships which all contributed to its steadily increasing attendance.

By 1982, the Old Strathcona Foundation was confident enough in the theatre's prospects to purchase the building outright from Towne Cinema. By this time, the asking price for the building had dropped to $425,000, which was estimated to be $8000 below its real market value. The Foundation began to make major upgrades and repairs to the interior of the building. A fundraising drive in 1987 allowed 422 modern sized plush seats to be installed, lowering the theatre's original seating capacity by almost 240. In 1989, a soundproofed cry room was installed with an independent sound system, allowing patrons with small children to come to films without worry.

1992 was the theatre's high-water mark, with a record number of tickets and memberships sold. A state of the art video projection system was installed in June 1993, but in that year revenue declined by $65,000, at least partly because of the growth of home video. The Old Strathcona Foundation began to see the theatre as a liability, and their confidence in the theatre was shaken when Susan Morrow quit her position as manager after having worked at the Princess for fifteen years.

== Theatre in crisis ==
Brian Paisley became the manager in early 1994. Paisley had a history with the Princess; he operated the small, independent Chinook Theatre out of the basement from 1980 to 1983. This organization was the seed of Paisley's Fringe Theatre Event, which he founded while still working out of this space in 1982. This event was the original Edmonton International Fringe Festival, now the largest event of its kind in North America.

Paisley quickly offered to buy the Princess, and reached an agreement with the Old Strathcona Foundation in October 1994 for an unspecified amount. The banks, however, refused to finance Paisley's plan and the deal fell through in December. The Old Strathcona Foundation quickly pivoted, and attempted in early 1995 to transfer control of the cinema to the Princess Theatre Society, "a small board made up of film experts and business people" including Paisley.

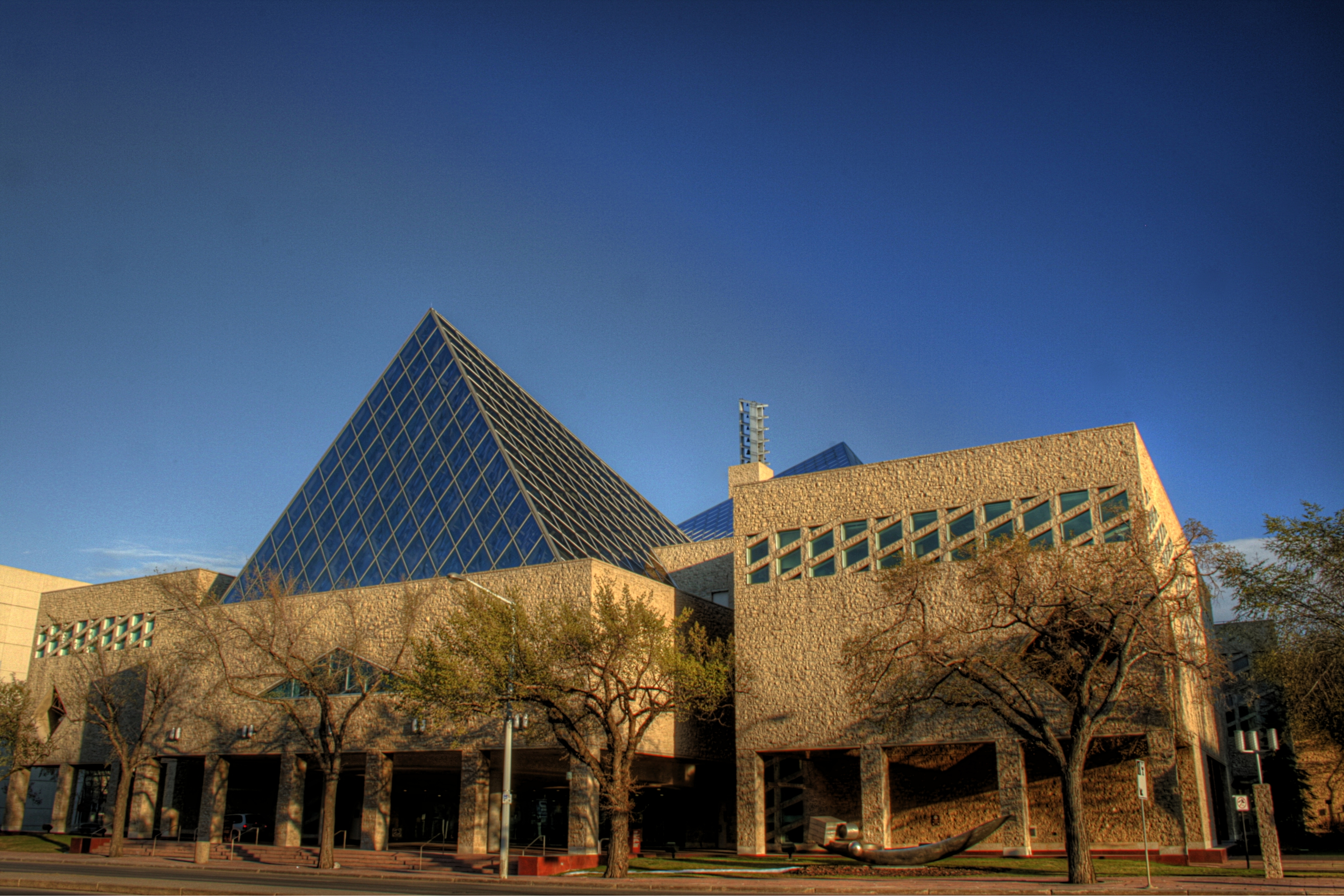
Edmonton's City Hall: City Council did not renew the Old Strathcona Foundation's funding in 1996

The Princess Theatre Society, while promising, failed to convince the Old Strathcona Foundation that it was capable of profitably managing the theatre, and negotiations broke down in April 1996. Paisley immediately resigned as director and ended his relationship with the theatre two months short of his contract expiring. Malcolm Parker became the new manager.

The Old Strathcona Foundation was running a major deficit by 1996, and in April Edmonton City Council declined to renew a $100,000 annual grant which the Foundation had received since 1985. The Foundation needed cash, and quickly sold the theatre for $450,000 to Calgary's Brar family, owners of the Plaza Theatre in that city. The decision was not popular, and even Old Strathcona Foundation member Judy Berghofer called the sale hasty.

The entire theatre staff was laid off in December 1996 once it became clear that the Brars were seriously considering purchasing the theatre, and the theatre's projectionists began what would be a six-month strike when it became clear the Brars would not respect a recently signed two-year contract with the Old Strathcona Foundation.

Edmonton's native Magic Lantern Theatres unexpectedly tried to buy the Princess for $500,000 on Christmas Eve 1996. A condition in the Brar's contract stated that the sale could be voided if another party bid at least ten percent more for the building. However, the Brars exercised an option to match any higher bids, and the sale went through in early January 1997.

The theatre reputedly fell into disrepair under the Brars. In 1998, the Princess was called "an absolutely lousy advertisement for late 20th century privatization" by Magic Lantern Theatre's Rick Ostapchuk, who said that the current owners had allowed the theatre to sink "with the velocity, if not the sanitized H2O, of a waterslide". By his count, 170 of the marquee's 330 lights were burnt out, and he did not believe the interior had been regularly washed or maintained.

== Magic Lantern Theatres ==
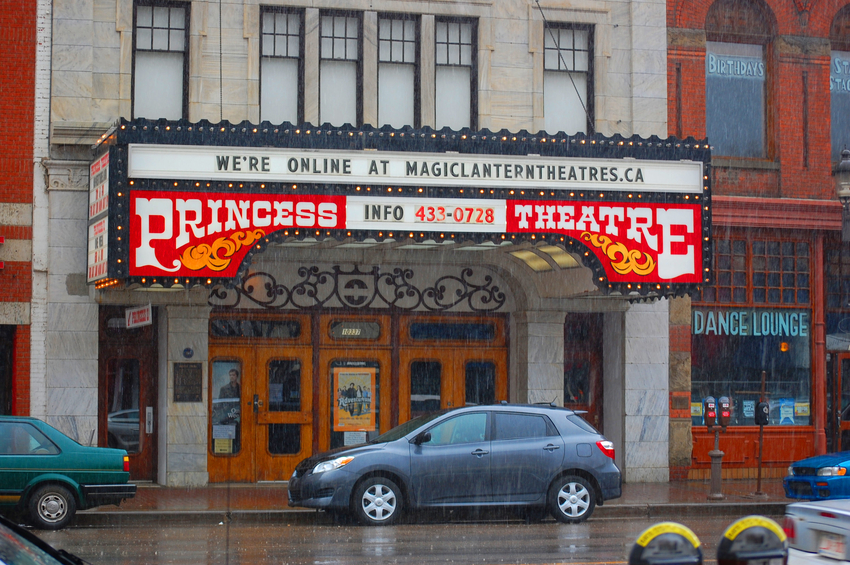
The Princess in 2009

The Brars handed over management of the theatre to Magic Lantern Theatres in June 1998, merely 18 months after purchasing it. Rick Ostapchuk immediately took over double duty as the manager of the recently renovated Garneau Theatre, as well as the Princess.

Ostapchuk vowed to return the Princess to the stature it held under Susan Morrow. To that end, he hired a new film programmer, Leonard Schein of Vancouver's Fifth Avenue Cinemas. The first film exhibited under new management was Michael Moore's The Big One. Ostapchuk began major renovations to the theatre, and in 1999 unveiled the Princess II in Chinook Theatre's old space. The basement theatre featured 100 seats, its own concession and washrooms, and a new 35 mm projector. The renovations cost $200,000.

While under Magic Lantern management, the Princess Theatre continued to be a notable destination for the local queer community. The Princess and the Garneau theatres were advertised together as "Edmonton's theatres of diversity" in local queer publications.

== Whyte Avenue multiplex debate ==
By 1999, Leonard Schein had become president of Alliance Atlantis, and had decided to build a six-screen art house cinema on Whyte Avenue. Many Edmontonians supported the plan, including former Princess manager Malcolm Parker, FAVA Executive Director Helen Folkmann, and Mayor Bill Smith.

Unsurprisingly, Ostapchuk was against Alliance Atlantis's plans for Whyte Avenue, believing that it would put both the Garneau and the Princess out of business. The Old Strathcona Foundation sided with Magic Lantern, and fought the plans. The argument went all the way to Edmonton City Council, which was asked to waive Old Strathcona's four-story height limit for the six-story multiplex. Council sided against Alliance Atlantis when Councillor Terry Cavanagh changed his vote at the last minute, defeating the motion 6-5.

== Queer history ==
The Princess Theatre has a history of being a welcoming space to the Edmonton queer community and has supported it through a variety of screenings and events over the years. During the 1985 Edmonton Pride Festival, the theatre held a screening of the Oscar winning documentary The Times of Harvey Milk. In the 1990s, it "embraced experimental films showcasing emergent New Queer Cinema, ultimately making the Princess Theatre a hub for queer culture." The lesbian community magazine Womonspace News frequently advertised film screenings held at the Princess.

== Present day ==
The theatre was operated by Magic Lantern Theatres as a first run cinema until January, 2016. At that point Plaza Entertainment, headed by Mike Brar, took it over again, ending Magic Lantern's tenancy. In 2006, after a lengthy dispute with a local developer, the City of Edmonton demolished the Gem Theatre (constructed 1913) on Jasper Avenue, making the Princess the city's oldest surviving cinema. The Princess Theatre closed its doors during COVID-19 pandemic in 2020 and the building was listed for sale in 2022.
