= Parkview School =

Parkview School can refer to:

- Parkview Community College of Technology — Barrow-in-Furness, Cumbria, England
- Parkview High School (Georgia) — Lilburn, Georgia
- Parkview High School (Missouri) — Springfield, Missouri
- Parkview High School (Wisconsin) — Orfordville, Wisconsin
- Parkview Arts and Science Magnet High School — Little Rock, Arkansas
- Oklahoma School for the Blind, also known as Parkview School
- Parkview School (Edmonton) — Edmonton, Alberta, Canada
- Parkview School (Christchurch) — Parklands, Christchurch, New Zealand
