= Park View =

Park View may refer to:

== Places ==
- Park View, Iowa
- Park View, West Virginia
- Park View Road, an English football ground
- Park View, Washington, D.C., a neighborhood
- Park View Estate in Mynydd-Bach, South Wales
- Park View Heights, Indiana

== Education ==
- Park View Primary School, Singapore
- Park View School, Chester-le-Street, County Durham, England
- Park View School, West Green, London, England
- Park View School, the former name of Rockwood Academy, Birmingham, England
- Park View High School (Loudoun County, Virginia)
- Park View High School (South Hill, Virginia)
- Park View Education Centre, Nova Scotia, Canada
- Park View School (Washington, D.C.), a NRHP listed site

== Sport ==
- Park View A.F.C., a football club in County Durham, England

== See also ==
- Parkview (disambiguation)
