= Parkview, Edmonton =

Parkview
- Neighbourhood
- Location of Parkview in Edmonton
- Coordinates: 53.525°N 113.567°W
- Country: Canada
- Province: Alberta
- City: Edmonton
- Quadrant: NW
- Ward: sipiwiyiniwak
- Sector: Mature area

Government
  - Administrative body: Edmonton City Council
  - Councillor: Thu Parmar

Area
  - Total: 1.54 km^{2} (0.59 sq mi)
- Elevation: 668 m (2,192 ft)

Population (2012)
  - Total: 3,334
  - Density: 2,164.9/km^{2} (5,607/sq mi)
  - Change (2009–12): ▼−1.4%
  - Dwellings: 1,343
- Website: Official website

Parkview is a residential neighbourhood in west Edmonton, Alberta, Canada. Parkview is one of the larger residential neighbourhoods in the city, and is located adjacent to the North Saskatchewan River Valley in the west portion of the City. The neighbourhood has good access to Whitemud Drive and Stony Plain Road, and the interior street layout is based on a modified grid network.

Most of Parkview developed in the mid-to-late 1950s. Almost all homes are single-detached houses, although there is a small apartment-style building located in the centre of the neighbourhood adjacent to the Valleyview Shopping Centre and Parkview Elementary and Junior High School. The Shopping Centre is located on 142 Street, in the heart of the neighborhood. This is a relatively unique placement for commercial activity, as shopping areas are more often located close to major roads.

Parkview’s name reflects the scenic views of the River Valley that can be seen from the neighbourhood. The portion of Parkview located to the east of 142nd Street was previously known as Valleyview, and the neighbourhood also incorporates a portion of the former Bueno Vista subdivision. All of these names describe the scenery of the area.

== Official Website ==
https://parkviewcommunityleague.ca/

== Neighborhood Organization ==
The community is represented by the Parkview Community League, established in 1956, which maintains a community hall and surrounding amenities located at 146 Street and 91 Avenue. The community League brings residents together, improves community amenities, and enhances the quality of life for you and your neighbours.

== Community Hall ==
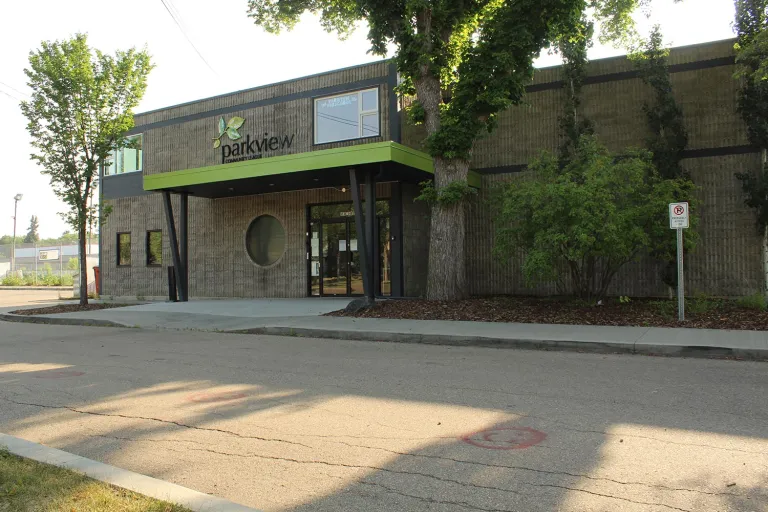
Parkview Community Hall 9135 146 St NW Edmonton, AB T5R 4L5

Parkview Community Hall, established in the mid 1950s, has recently been upgraded providing a modern, multi-use venue for both community events and third party rentals.

== Demographics ==
In the City of Edmonton's 2012 municipal census, Parkview had a population of 3,334 living in 1,343 dwellings, a -1.4% change from its 2009 population of 3,382. With a land area of 1.54 km^{2} (0.59 sq mi), it had a population density of 2,164.9 people/km^{2} in 2012.

== Residential development ==
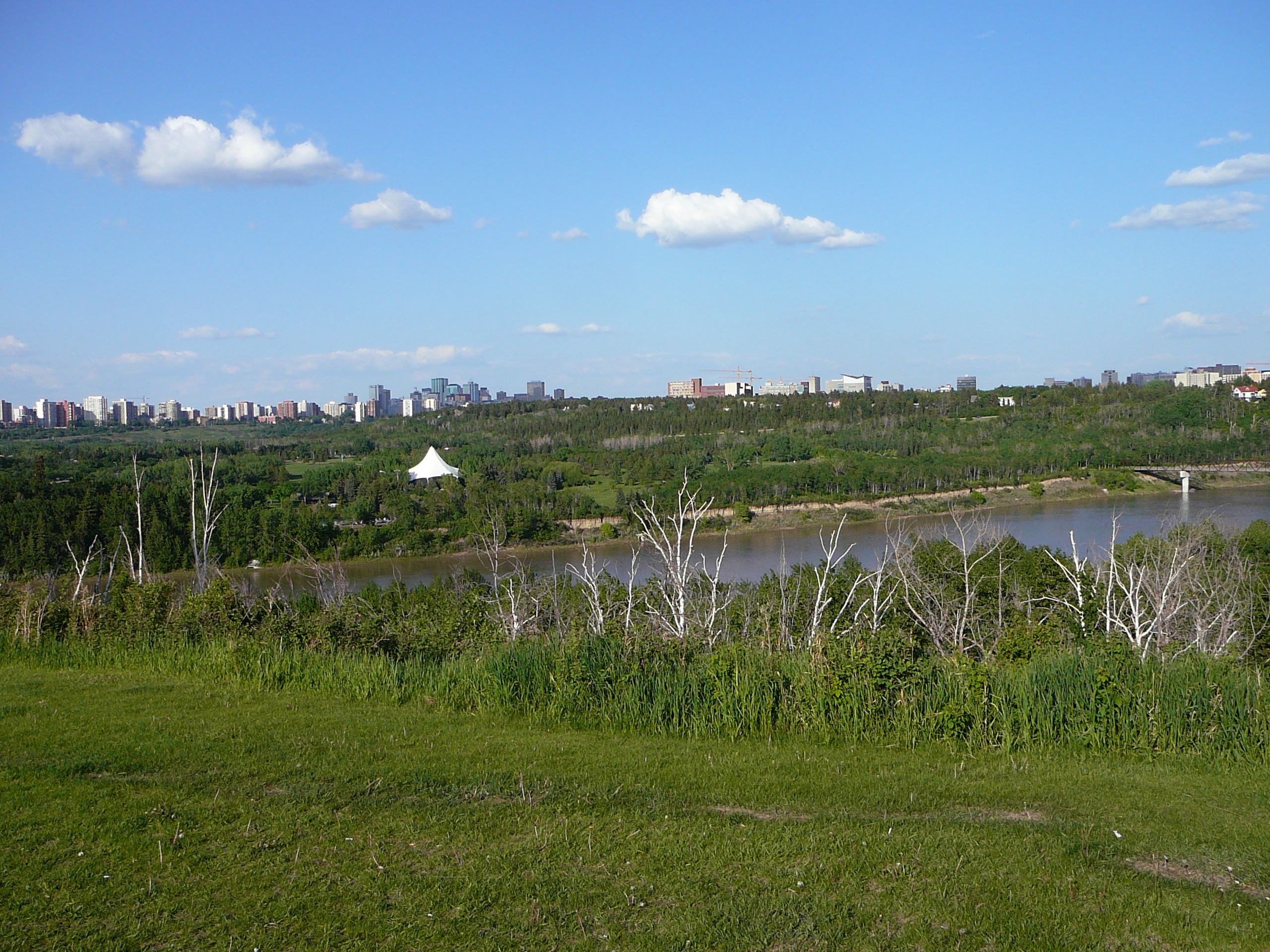
The Valleyview portion of Parkview overlooks the North Saskatchewan River Valley.

Most of the residential construction in the neighbourhood occurred after the end of World War II, with seven out of ten residences being constructed between 1946 and 1960. Substantially all residential construction was completed by 1970. Residences east of 142 Street tend to be more affluent, while residences west of 142 Street tend to be more affordable. According to the 2005 municipal census, 100% of the residences in the neighbourhood are single-family dwellings. Substantially all residences are owner-occupied.

There are two schools in the neighbourhood. Parkview Elementary Junior High School is operated by the Edmonton Public School System. St. Rose Junior High School is operated by the Edmonton Catholic School System.

Edmonton's Valley Zoo is located in the river valley to the south east of the neighbourhood with access provided by Buena Vista Road. Buena Vista Road also provides access to Laurier Park, a good place for families to go for picnics, and Buena Vista Park. Both parks are part of the city's river valley park system. A foot bridge, located in the river valley to the east of the neighbourhood provides access to Hawrelak Park on the south side.

Whitemud Drive, with access from 149 Street, provides residents with good access to destinations on the south side, including: the University of Alberta, Old Strathcona, Whyte Avenue, Southgate Centre, and Fort Edmonton Park. Travel west along 87 Avenue takes residents to West Edmonton Mall. Residents also enjoy good access to the downtown core.

Parkview is bounded on the north by the MacKenzie Ravine, on the east by the North Saskatchewan River valley, on the west by 149 Street, and on the south by 87 Avenue and Buena Vista Road.

== See also ==
- Edmonton Federation of Community Leagues
