= Old Strathcona =

Historic district in Edmonton, Alberta, Canada

- Whyte Avenue and Gateway Boulevard

- Location within Edmonton
- 53°31′5″N 113°29′50″W
- Location: Edmonton, Alberta, Canada

History
- Built: 1891-1913

Site notes
- Area: 3.24 ha (8.0 acres)
- Architectural styles: Late Victorian, Edwardian
- Governing body: City of Edmonton

Old Strathcona is a historic district in south-central Edmonton, Alberta, Canada. Once the commercial core of the separate city of Strathcona, the area is now home to many of Edmonton's arts and entertainment facilities, as well as a local shopping hub for residents and students at the nearby University of Alberta. The district centres on Whyte Avenue and has shops, restaurants, bars and buskers.

== Official definitions ==
=== Provincial historic area ===
In 2007, Old Strathcona was named Alberta's second Provincial Historic Area. The district comprises an area of five city blocks from 85 Avenue south to 80 Avenue and from 102 Street west to 106 street.

=== Business revitalization zone ===
The Old Strathcona and Area Business Revitalization Zone (BRZ) is a roughly cross-shaped business revitalization zone, extending along Whyte Avenue from just west of 109 Street in the west, to just east of 99 Street in the east, and along Gateway Boulevard from 86 Avenue in the north to University Avenue in the south.

== History ==
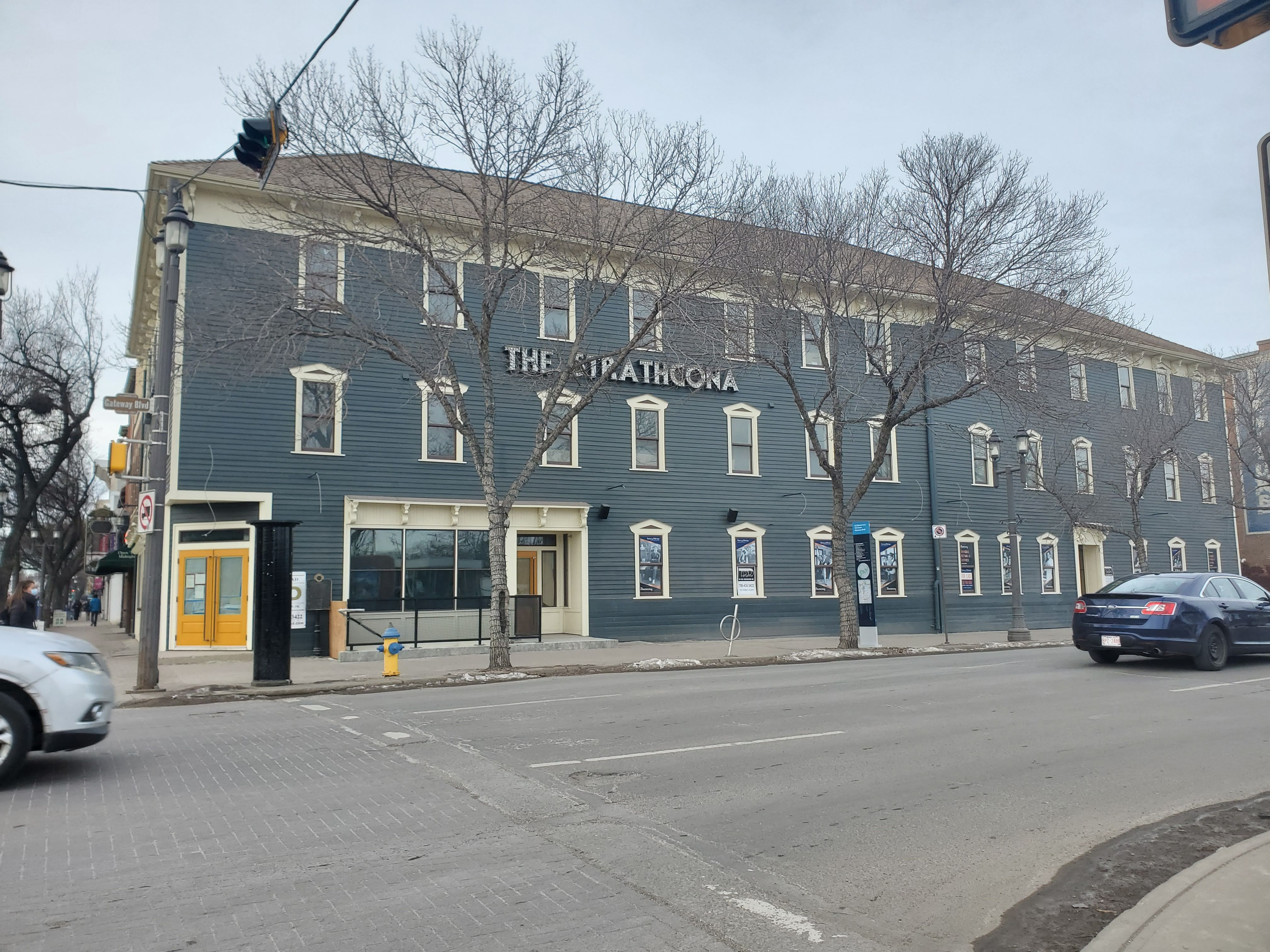
The Strathcona Hotel

Old Strathcona was once a municipality separate from Edmonton, achieving town status in 1899 and city status in 1907. The City of Strathcona amalgamated with Edmonton in 1912.

A large part of Whyte Avenue's popularity is the historical character of its buildings, many of which are more than one hundred years old. The oldest building is the Strathcona Hotel at 10302 Whyte Avenue. It was built in 1891 by the railway and until 1904 was the largest hotel in the area. During prohibition (1918-1924) the hotel was owned by the Presbyterian Church and housed the house of the Westminster Ladies College.

Early construction used mostly wood, but this changed in 1902 when the Town of Strathcona passed a bylaw requiring brick buildings in the downtown core to prevent a major fire. Many of the current brick buildings were erected during the 1910–1912 boom that brought thousands of settlers from eastern Canada, Britain and continental Europe, the U.S. and other parts of the world. Whyte Avenue in the early 1890s was dominated by primitive shack homes and quickly-built pioneer stores. These early structures were soon replaced by more substantial wood-frame two-storey buildings or, in the case of the Ross Block, by a brick building even before the town's anti-fire bylaw.

In 2005, Edmonton City Council sent a letter to the Province of Alberta requesting heritage status for the area and the new status of Provincial Heritage Area in 2007.

=== Historic buildings and government recognition ===
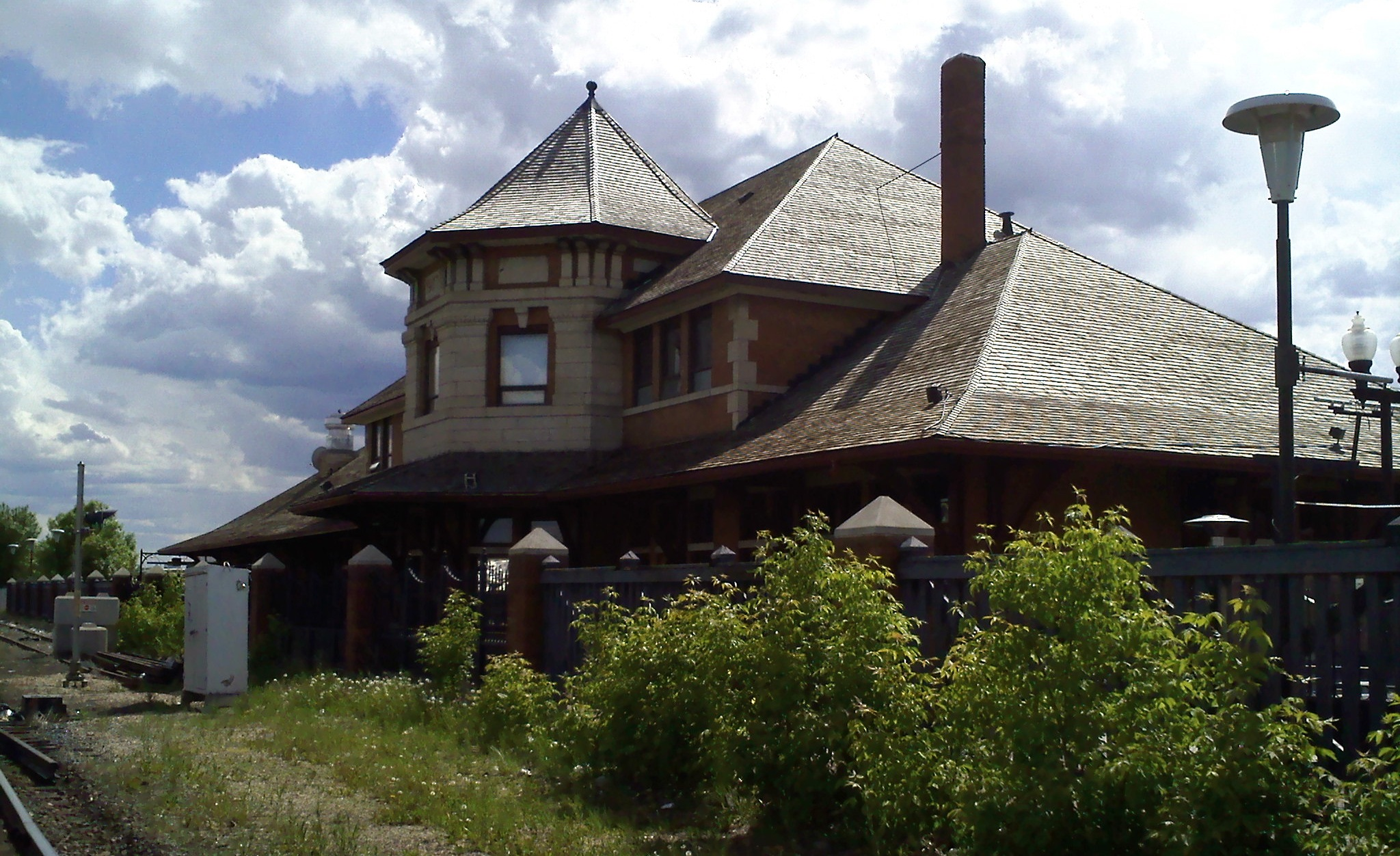
The 1908 Strathcona Railway Station, just south of Whyte Avenue in the centre of Old Strathcona.

Old Strathcona is Alberta's second Provincial Historic Area (downtown Fort Macleod being the first) and has a number of historic buildings.

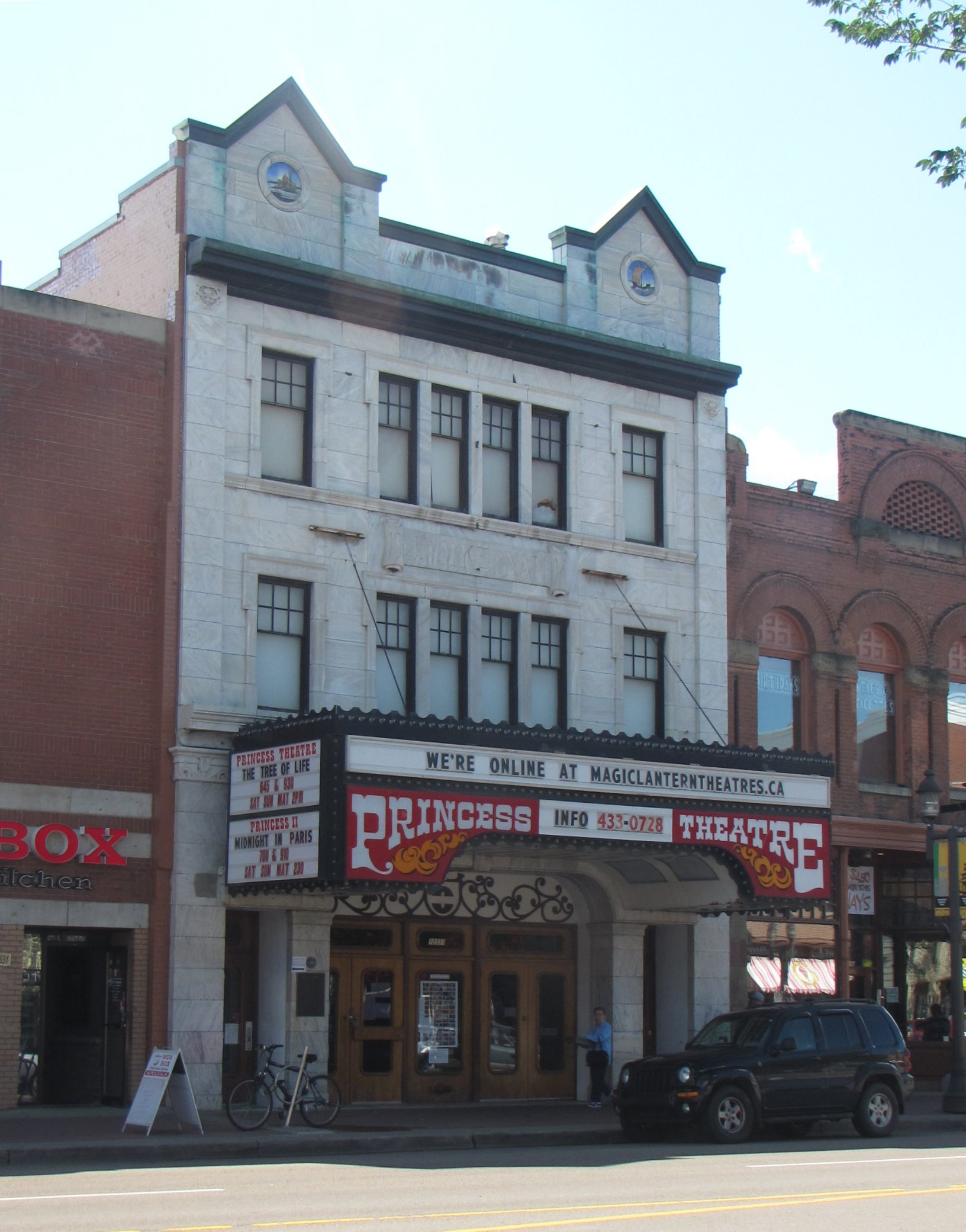
Princess Theatre

The designation as a Provincial Historic Area applies to roughly 5 square blocks that formed the commercial hub of the former city of Strathcona. It runs from 85 Avenue south to 80 Avenue and from 102 Street west to 106 Street. Within this area are many of the most significant buildings from Strathcona's early boom from the arrival of the Calgary and Edmonton Railway in 1891 to the Edmonton real estate crash of 1913–14. Heritage buildings within this area include the Strathcona Hotel, the Gainers Block, the Orange Hall, the Canadian Pacific Railway Station, the South Side Post Office, the Douglas Block, the Princess Theatre, the Strathcona Public Library, the Connaught Armoury, and Old Scona Academic High School.

Outside of the Provincial Heritage Area in the wider Old Strathcona area are several non-commercial buildings that are also protected as heritage buildings including churches and residences. Within the Edmonton-Strathcona provincial electoral district, which covers most of the former City of Strathcona, there are 18 Provincial Historic Resources and 11 Registered Historic Resources recognized by the Government of Alberta. Fourteen Municipal Restoric Resources recognized by the City of Edmonton (some buildings are on both registers).

== Present day ==
After the amalgamation of the cities of Strathcona and Edmonton, Strathcona went into an economic slump and little re-development occurred, allowing many of the area's old buildings to continue to the present day. In the 1970s, the Edmonton city council bought many properties along 104 Street in preparation for a freeway through the historic area. A "Save-the-district" movement emerged and the plan was abandoned. Old Strathcona then became more Bohemian in tone, as well as performing its historic purpose of supplying goods and services to local residents, students at nearby University of Alberta, and residents of the nearby County of Strathcona whose county offices would first be located in Old Strathcona

The Strathcona Hotel, the first building built after the arrival of the railway that had established the hamlet of South Edmonton in 1891 (leading to the town and city of Strathcona) has been in operation ever since (excepting the period of Prohibition, 1916–1923), and other bars were never absent from the district.

=== Theatre ===
Old Strathcona is home to an independent theatre scene, with nine theatre companies operating out of several buildings in the neighbourhood, including the Varscona Theatre and The Walterdale Playhouse. The Varscona Theatre alone is home to several award-winning companies: Shadow Theatre, Teatro la Quindicina, Plain Jane Theatre Company, the variety show That's Terrific! and improvisation troupe Die-Nasty. Every August, Old Strathcona plays host to the Edmonton International Fringe Festival, the largest and oldest Fringe Theatre event in North America. Edmonton historian Lawrence Herzog called the diversity of material being produced in the Old Strathcona Theatre District "wide and astonishing."

=== Cinema ===
Old Strathcona is also known for its art house theatres, The Princess Theatre and the Garneau Theatre. In 2011, Edmonton's Metro Cinema Society took over management of the Garneau Theatre, while The Princess continued to be operated by Magic Lantern Theatres for a short period of time, until the building owners, the Brar family, took over the business.

== Events ==
Old Strathcona has a year-round farmers' market that requires all vendors to be primary producers. Edmonton's market garden industry finds an average of 10,000 customers every Saturday.
