= Walterdale Playhouse =

Theatre in Edmonton, Alberta, Canada

Coordinates: 53°31′9″N 113°29′46″W

Originally Strathcona Fire Hall No. 1, built in 1909, became Fire Hall No. 6 in the 1912 amalgamation with Edmonton. It has housed the Walterdale Theatre since 1974, and has been an Alberta Historic Site since 14 July 1976. The tower still holds the original bell.

The Walterdale Playhouse is an amateur live performance venue in the Strathcona neighborhood of Edmonton. In 2008 the venue celebrated 50 year of theater. The theatre is mainly run by donations and volunteers in the community.

== History ==
The Walterdale Playhouse was founded in 1959 by the Walterdale Theatre Associates it is one of Western Canada's oldest amateur theatre groups. Since 1974 Walterdale Theatre Associates has been located in the heart of Old Strathcona in the oldest fire hall in Alberta, Strathcona Firehall No. 1 (later Edmonton No. 6), which the Associates converted into the Walterdale Playhouse. Built in 1909, the firehall is now designated a Provincial Registered Historical Resource. This venue seats 145. In 1994 the theatre received an award for "Outstanding Contribution to Performing Arts". To those in the Edmonton community it is a meaningful part of the arts and theatre culture enjoyed within the city.

The two-story brick firehall was designed by Wilson and Herrald and built by J. M. Eaton. Construction began in 1909 and finished in 1910. Originally, it had space for nine horses and three fire wagons. The upper floor and the ground floor were connected with two fire poles. The chief's office, general hall, bedrooms, band room, and bathroom were upstairs. It remained in service as a firehall until 1954 and served as a storage facility from 1954-1974.
