= Parkview Square =

Office skyscraper in Singapore

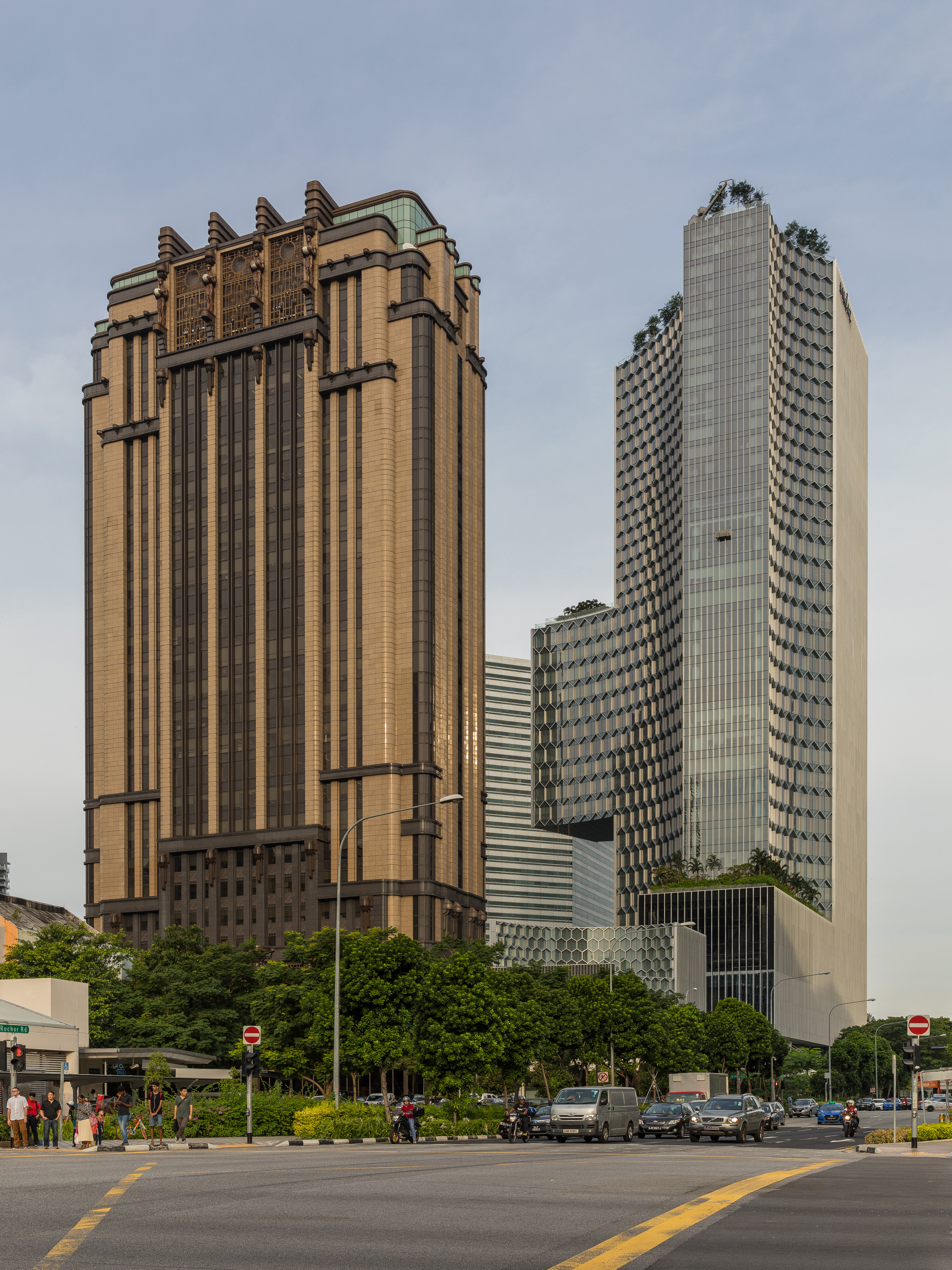
- Interactive map of the Parkview Square area

General information
- Type: Commercial offices
- Architectural style: Postmodern / Neo Art Deco / New Classical
- Location: North Bridge Road, Downtown Core, Singapore
- Coordinates: 1°18′0.5″N 103°51′27.48″E
- Construction started: 1999
- Completed: 2002
- Owner: Chyau Fwu Development
- Operator: Chyau Fwu Development

Height
- Roof: 144 m (472 ft)

Technical details
- Floor count: 24; 2 basements
- Floor area: 39,145 m^{2} (421,350 sq ft)
- Lifts/elevators: 11

Design and construction
- Architect: DP Architects
- Developer: Chyau Fwu Development

Website
- www.ParkviewSquare.com

Parkview Square is an office building located in the Downtown Core planning area of the Central Region in Singapore. It is situated along North Bridge Road, and is near the major commercial hub at Marina Centre. It is next to Bugis MRT station, Bugis Junction, and The Gateway, and straddles the Rochor Road and Ophir Road corridor.

== Occupants ==
Parkview Square houses the Honorary Consulate of Oman on the 4th floor, the Embassy of the United Arab Emirates on the 9th floor, as well as the embassies of Austria and Mongolia on the 24th floor. The third floor is entirely occupied by the Parkview Museum where international contemporary art exhibitions are presented every year.

=== Atlas ===
Atlas, the bar in the lobby of the building, has a unique 3-storey gin tower housing over a thousand gins. The tower used to hold a wine chiller from which a female bartender dressed as a fairy would retrieve bottles on request by means of a flying wire apparatus.

== Design and architecture ==
Parkview Square was designed by American architect James Adams, with DP Architects of Singapore as the local architect. It was developed by Chyau Fwu Group, and it was the last major project by C. S. Hwang, its founder.

Although it is a modern building, having been completed in 2002, it is designed in the classic Art Deco style, inspired by New York City's 1929 Chanin Building. The exterior surface of the building is clad in brown granite, bronze, lacquer, and glass.

The lobby is also designed in the Art Deco style and features a 15m-high ceiling with hand-crafted details.

The open plaza of Parkview Square is reminiscent of Piazza San Marco in Venice with sculptures and statues surrounding the open plaza. There are many bronze effigies of some of the most famous figures in world history, including Sun Yat-sen, Abraham Lincoln, Salvador Dalí, and Mozart.

The building has widespread use of motifs, sculptures, and ornamentation. The building is guarded by eight gigantic fiberglass statues of men holding a light ball in their hands, four of them standing on each broad side of the building's crown. Gargoyles decorate the building’s exterior.

=== Golden crane statue ===
In the center of the plaza is a statue of a golden crane with its head lifted, its wings in pre-flight mode. On the pedestal, a poem is written in Chinese:

黄鹤楼

故国旧有黄鹤楼
北望神州几千秋
黄鹤展翅飞万里
伟哉狮城见鹤楼

The poem refers to a mythical crane looking towards the direction of its temple (a place of worship in Hubei, China) and eager to fly the thousands of miles back, depicting the homesickness of the owner. The poem also appears as an Easter egg in Original illustration of the Chinese version of StarCraft 2.

The statue is supposed to bring wealth to the building.

== Gallery ==
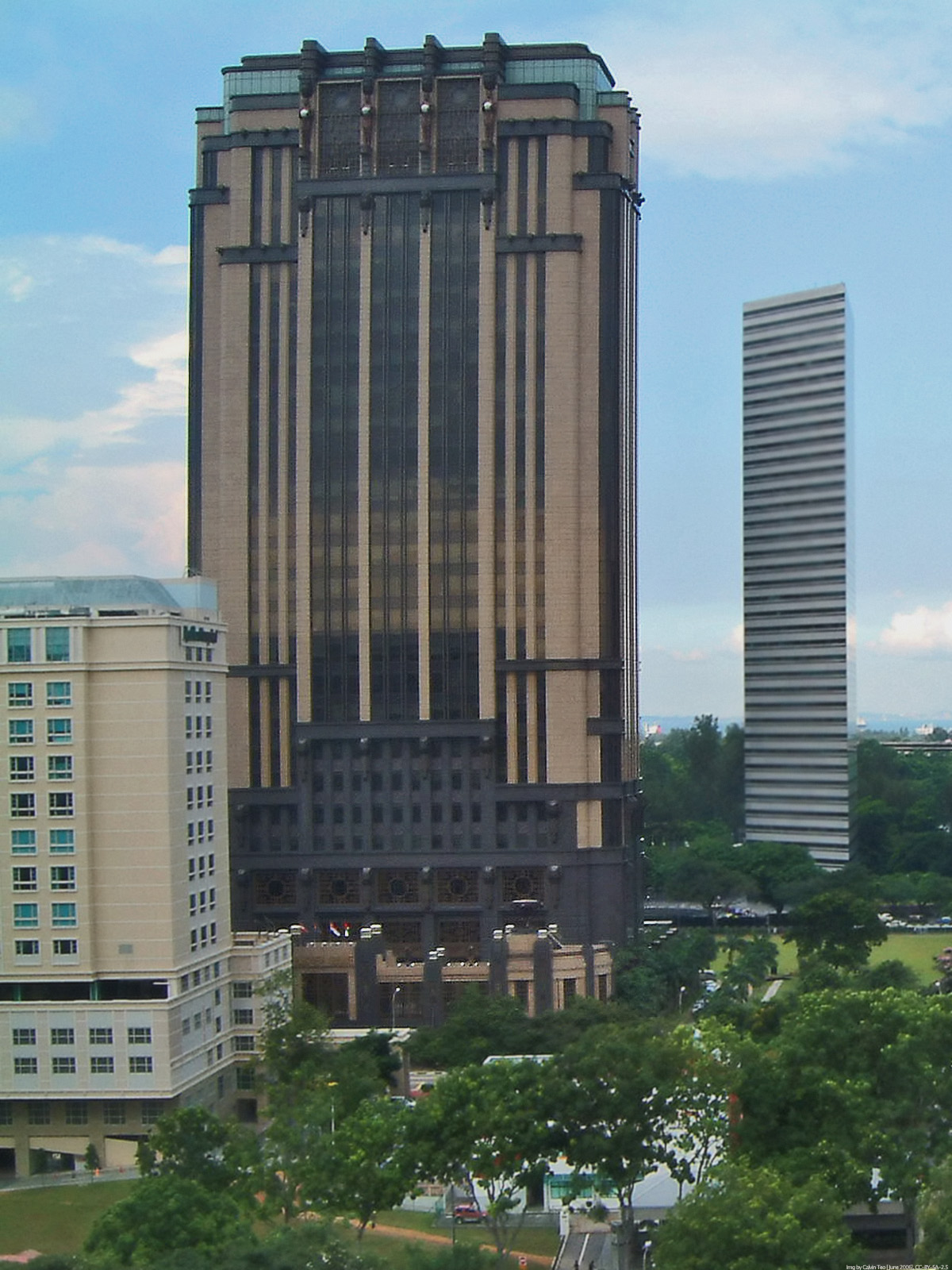

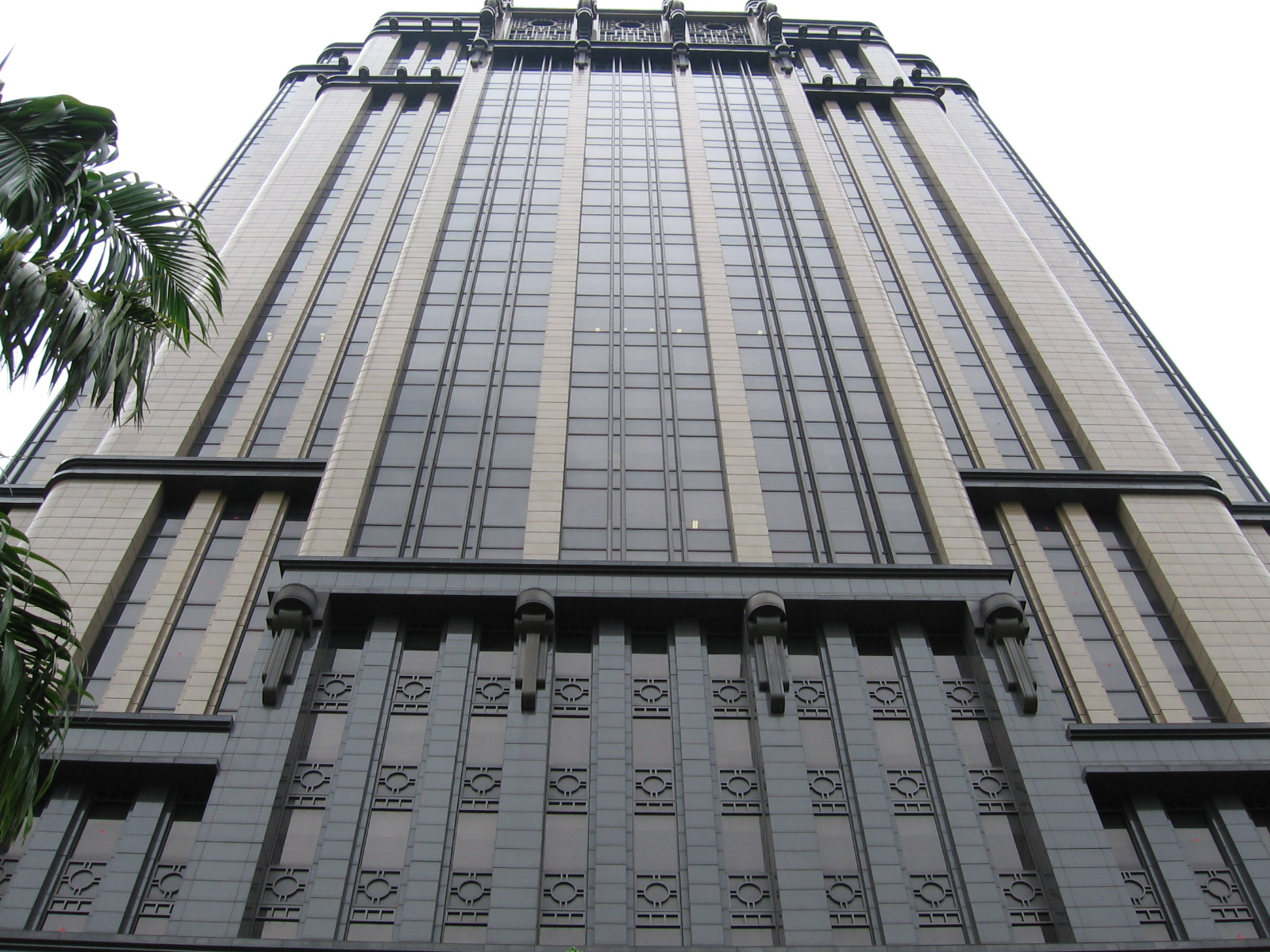

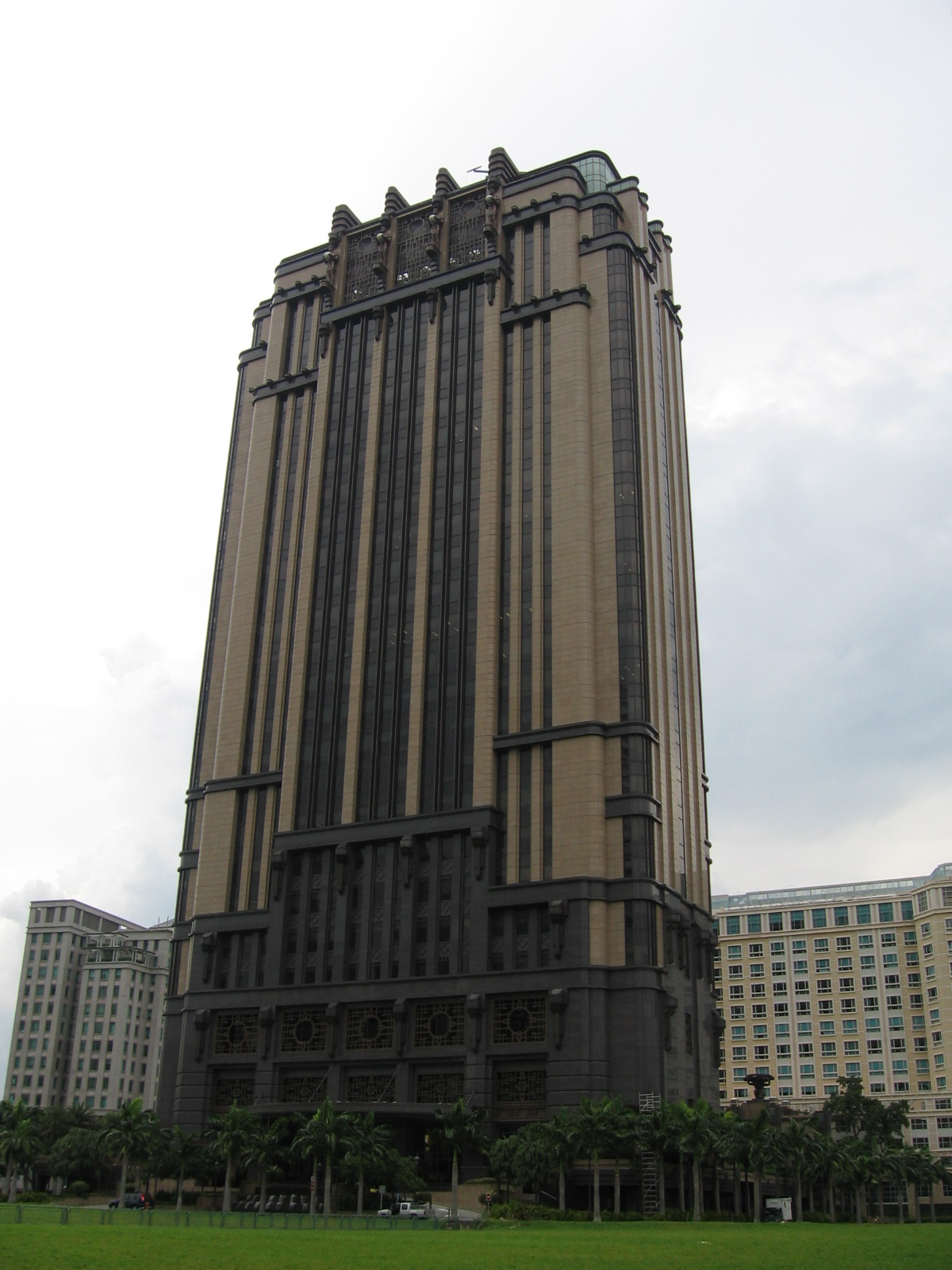

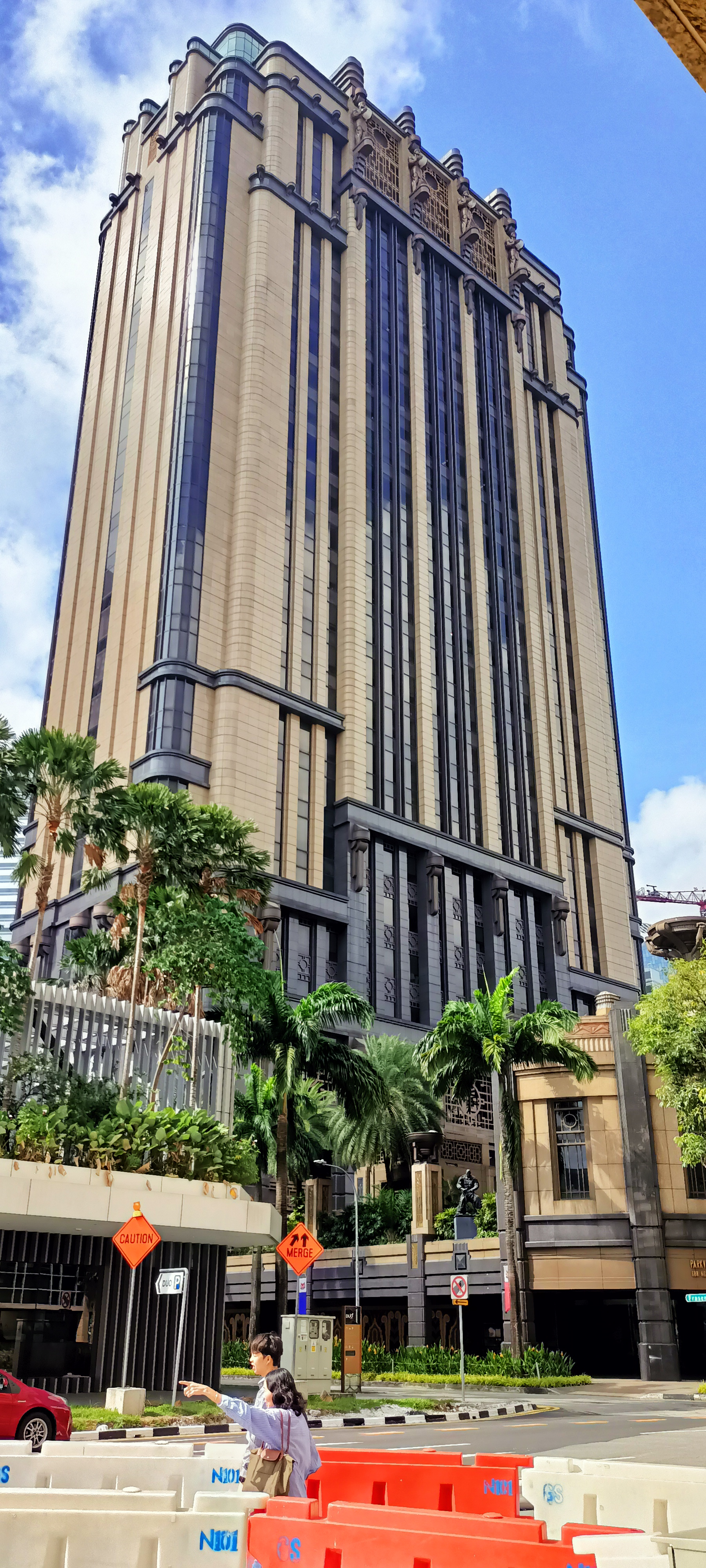

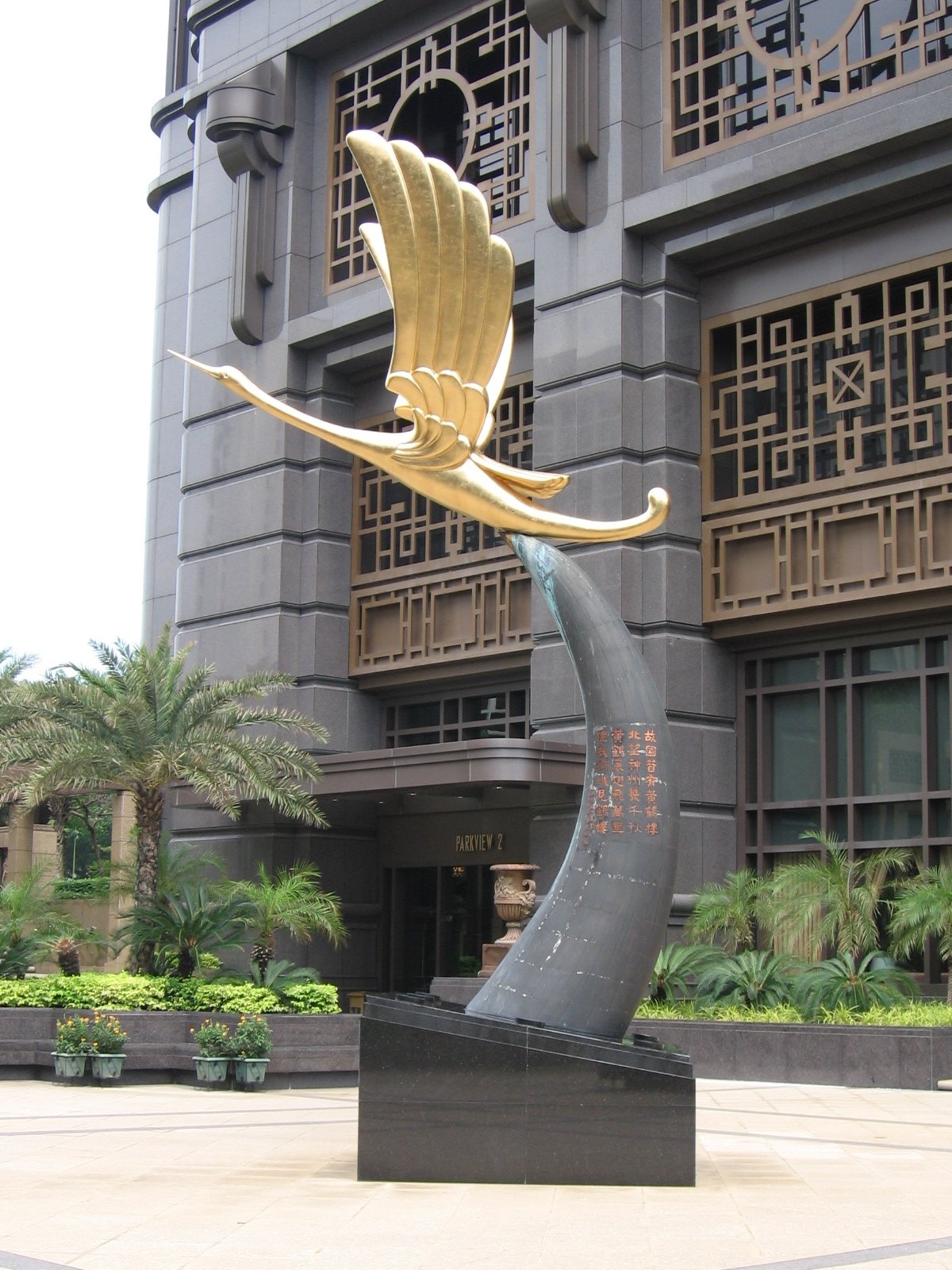
Signature crane sculpture
