= Parkview Arts and Science Magnet High School =

Location
- 2501 Barrow Road; Little Rock, Arkansas 72204; United States; 34°43′53″N 92°22′13″W

Information
- Type: Public magnet school
- Established: 1968 (58 years ago)
- School district: Little Rock School District
- CEEB code: 041443
- NCES School ID: 050900000627
- Principal: Nickolous Anderson
- Faculty: 90.12 (on FTE basis)
- Grades: 9th - 12th
- Enrollment: 1,063 (2023-2024)
- Student to teacher ratio: 12:37
- Colors: Red, white, blue
- Athletics conference: 5A South
- Mascot: Patriot
- Team name: Little Rock Parkview Patriots
- Website: www.lrsd.org/o/parkview

For other places with this name, see Parkview School (disambiguation).

Parkview Arts and Science Magnet High School is a magnet school in Little Rock, Arkansas, United States that concentrates heavily on science and the arts. It is Arkansas' first and only interdistrict high school. Although administered by the Little Rock School District, Parkview may receive students from the Pulaski County Special School District and the North Little Rock School District. It is commonly referred to as Little Rock Parkview.

Little Rock Parkview serves grades 9–12.

== Athletics ==
The Parkview High School mascot is the Patriot with red, white, and blue as the school colors.

For 2024–2026, the Parkview Patriots compete in the 5A Classification administered by the Arkansas Activities Association within the 5A South Conference. The Patriots participate in baseball, basketball (boys/girls), bowling, cheer, cross country, dance, debate, football, golf (boys/girls), soccer (boys/girls), softball, swimming & diving (boys/girls), track & field (boys/girls), and volleyball.

- Football: Parkview has won 7 state football titles. They won state titles in 1973, 1974, 1976, and 1977. 45 years later, they began a three-peat, winning the 5A State Championship against Shiloh Christian in 2022 and 2023, and Farmington High School in 2024.
- Basketball: The Lady Patriots have won four state championships (2004, 2005, 2007, 2012), and the boys have won 14 state basketball championships. In 1988 and 1992, the boys basketball team won the Arkansas high school overall title when the state held a tournament of classification champions.

== Notable alumni ==
The following are notable people associated with Parkview High School. If the person was a Parkview High School student, the number in parentheses indicates the year of graduation; if the person was a faculty or staff member, that person's title and years of association are included:

- Jamaal Anderson (2004)—professional football player (NFL)
- David Auburn (1987)—playwright.
- John Irving Bloom (aka Joe Bob Briggs) (1971)—actor; writer; movie critic; columnist.
- Kevin Brockmeier (1991)—novelist who wrote Brief History Of The Dead.
- Derek Fisher (1992)—professional basketball player and coach (NBA); 5x NBA champion.
- Allen Flanigan (2019)—professional basketball player
- Keith Jackson (1984)—member of College Football Hall of Fame and former professional football player (NFL).
- Quincy Lewis (1995)—professional basketball player.
- Daryl Macon (2014)—basketball player for Maccabi Tel Aviv of the Israeli Basketball Premier League
- Art Porter Jr. (1979)—jazz saxophonist.
- Frank Scott Jr. (born 1983)—politician
- Duane Washington (1983)—professional basketball player (NBA).
