= Parkview School (Edmonton) =

Parkview Elementary Junior High School

Location
- 14313 92 Avenue NW; Edmonton, Alberta; Canada; 53.527203°N 113.567474°W

Information
- Type: Public
- Motto: Palma Non Sine Pulvere (No Reward Without Effort)
- Established: 1957
- School district: Edmonton Public Schools
- Principal: Ms. Joanne Aldridge
- Grades: K-9
- Enrollment: 550
- Language: English
- Colors: White, dark blue, gold
- Athletics: Basketball, volleyball, badminton, rugby, soccer, slow pitch, cross country
- Website: parkview.epsb.ca

Parkview School is an elementary junior high school located in the Parkview neighbourhood of Edmonton, Alberta, Canada.

== Attendance ==
Parkview School is a district site for a variety of programs in the West end of Edmonton. It has several designated feeder schools, but students attend from many parts of the city and surrounding areas. It currently has an attendance of approximately 590 students.

== Programs ==
Parkview School offers a variety of programs, including:

- Pre AP
- Secondary Languages: French, Mandarin Chinese, Spanish
- Special Needs: Interactions, Community Mental Health Classrooms, ESL
- Innovate
- Foods & Fashion
- Computer studies
- Drama
- Art
- Music
- Outdoor education
- Sports performance

== Academics ==
Parkview School is not known to have a reputation for academic excellence. The school participates in a variety of Mathematic contests (Gauss, Atlantic-Pacific, CNML, Pascal, AMC 8, Edmonton Junior High Math Contest).

== Extracurricular ==
The school also has many different clubs offered. The clubs are extra-curricular and are often on during lunches and after school. The school team's mascot is a panther, so the school teams are often dubbed "The Panthers". There are a wide range of extracurricular activities in the school, including:

School teams

- Boys Junior and Senior Basketball team
- Girls Junior and Senior Basketball team
- Boys Junior and Senior Volleyball team
- Girls Junior and Senior Volleyball team
- Boys Junior and Senior Badminton team
- Girls Junior and Senior Badminton team
- Boys & girls Soccer team
- Co-ed Indoor Soccer team
- Flag rugby team
- Cross country running team
- Track and Field team

School clubs

- Ski and Snowboard Club
- Concert Band
- Jazz Band

== External links and references ==
- Parkview School Website
- Official website of Edmonton Public Schools
