= 1st Canadian Screen Awards =

1st year of awards given by the Academy of Canadian Cinema & Television

- Date: March 3, 2013
- Location: Sony Centre for the Performing Arts, Toronto
- Hosted by: Martin Short

Highlights
- Most awards: Film: War Witch (10); TV: Flashpoint (7)
- Most nominations: Film: War Witch (12); TV: Flashpoint (11)
- Best Motion Picture: War Witch
- Best Dramatic Series: Flashpoint
- Best Comedy Series: Less Than Kind

Television/radio coverage
- Network: CBC

The 1st Canadian Screen Awards were held on March 3, 2013, to honour achievements in Canadian film, television, and digital media production in 2012. This was the inaugural Canadian Screen Awards ceremony, following the Academy of Canadian Cinema & Television's decision, announced in 2012, to merge its formerly separate Genie Awards (for film) and Gemini Awards (for television) into a single ceremony. In addition, the Canadian Screen Awards include awards for achievements in digital media.

Nominations were announced on January 15, 2013. The awards ceremony was hosted by Martin Short.

== Ratings ==
The program was watched by 756,000 Canadian viewers, approximately double the typical ratings for Genie or Gemini ceremonies in recent years.

== Film ==
Motion Picture	Direction
War Witch (Rebelle) — Pierre Even, Marie-Claude Poulin; L'Affaire Dumont — Nicole Robert; Inch'Allah — Luc Déry, Kim McCraw, Stephen Traynor; Laurence Anyways — Nathanaël Karmitz, Lyse Lafontaine; Midnight's Children — David Hamilton, Doug Mankoff, Steven Silver, Neil Tabatznik, Andrew Spaulding; Still Mine — Jody Colero, Avi Federgreen, Tamara Deverell	Kim Nguyen, War Witch (Rebelle); Xavier Dolan, Laurence Anyways; Michael Dowse, Goon; Bernard Émond, All That You Possess (Tout ce que tu possèdes); Deepa Mehta, Midnight's Children
Actor in a leading role	Actress in a leading role
James Cromwell, Still Mine; Patrick Drolet, All That You Possess (Tout ce que tu possèdes); Marc-André Grondin, L'Affaire Dumont; David Morse, Collaborator; Melvil Poupaud, Laurence Anyways	Rachel Mwanza, War Witch (Rebelle); Evelyne Brochu, Inch'Allah; Geneviève Bujold, Still Mine; Marilyn Castonguay, L'Affaire Dumont; Suzanne Clément, Laurence Anyways
Actor in a supporting role	Actress in a supporting role
Serge Kanyinda, War Witch (Rebelle); Jay Baruchel, Goon; Kim Coates, Goon; Stephan James, Home Again; Elias Koteas, Winnie	Seema Biswas, Midnight's Children; Fefe Dobson, Home Again; Alice Morel-Michaud, The Pee-Wee 3D: The Winter That Changed My Life (Les Pee-Wee 3D); Gabrielle Miller, Moving Day; Sabrina Ouazani, Inch'Allah
Original Screenplay	Adapted Screenplay
Kim Nguyen, War Witch (Rebelle); Jason Buxton, Blackbird; Xavier Dolan, Laurence Anyways; Bernard Émond, All That You Possess (Tout ce que tu possèdes); Michael McGowan, Still Mine	Salman Rushdie, Midnight's Children; Jay Baruchel and Evan Goldberg, Goon; David Cronenberg, Cosmopolis; Anita Doron, The Lesser Blessed; Martin Villeneuve, Mars and April (Mars et Avril)
Feature Length Documentary	Short Documentary
Stories We Tell - Sarah Polley, Anita Lee; Alphée of the Stars (Alphée des étoiles) - Eric De Gheldere, Hugo Latulippe, Colette Loumède; Indie Game: The Movie - Lisanne Pajot, James Swirsky; Over My Dead Body - Virginie Dubois, Stéphanie Morissette, Brigitte Poupart; The World Before Her - Ed Barreveld, Nisha Pahuja, Cornelia Principe	The Boxing Girls of Kabul - Annette Clarke, Ariel Nasr; The Fuse: Or How I Burned Simon Bolivar - Igor Drljaca; Keep a Modest Head (Ne crâne pas sois modeste) - Deco Dawson, Catherine Chagnon; Let the Daylight Into the Swamp - Anita Lee, Jeffrey St. Jules; Three Walls - Zaheed Mawani, Andrea Bussmann
Best Live Action Short Drama	Best Animated Short
Throat Song - Miranda de Pencier, Stacey Aglok Macdonald; First Snow (Première neige) - Michaël Lalancette; Frost - Lauren Grant, Jeremy Ball, Robert Munroe; Herd Leader (Chef de meute) - Fanny-Laure Malo, Sarah Pellerin, Chloé Robichaud; The Near Future (Le futur proche) - Sophie Goyette	Paula - Julie Roy and Dominic Étienne Simard; Bydlo - Julie Roy and Patrick Bouchard; Demoni - Theodore Ushev; Edmond Was a Donkey (Edmond était un âne) - Richard Van Den Boom, Franck Dion and Julie Roy
Art Direction/Production Design	Cinematography
Emmanuel Fréchette and Josée Arsenault, War Witch (Rebelle); Arvinder Grewal, Antiviral; André Guimond, L'Affaire Dumont; Dilip Mehta, Midnight's Children; Anne Pritchard, Laurence Anyways	Nicolas Bolduc, War Witch (Rebelle); Philippe Lavalette, Inch'Allah; Giles Nuttgens, Midnight's Children; Bobby Shore, Goon; Brendan Steacy, Still Mine
Costume Design	Editing
Xavier Dolan and François Barbeau, Laurence Anyways; Patricia Henderson, Mad Ship; Wendy Partridge, Resident Evil: Retribution; Wendy Partridge, Silent Hill: Revelation 3D; Éric Poirier, War Witch (Rebelle)	Richard Comeau, War Witch (Rebelle); Roderick Deogrades, Still Mine; Valérie Héroux, L'Affaire Dumont; Sophie Leblond, Inch'Allah; Kimberlee McTaggart, Blackbird
Overall Sound	Sound Editing
Claude La Haye, Daniel Bisson and Bernard Gariépy Strobl, War Witch (Rebelle); Sylvain Arseneault, Steph Carrier, Lou Solakofski and Don White, Midnight's Children; Olivier Calvert, Pascal Beaudin and Luc Boudrias, Mars and April (Mars et Avril); Philip Stall, Ian Rankin and Lou Solakofski, Antiviral; Zander Rosborough and Allan Scarth, The Disappeared	Martin Pinsonnault, Jean-François Sauvé, Simon Meilleur and Claire Pochon, War Witch (Rebelle); Pierre-Jules Audet, Michelle Cloutier, Thierry Bourgault D'Amico, Nathalie Fleurant and Cédrick Marin, L'Affaire Dumont; Stephen Barden, Steve Baine, Kevin Banks, Alex Bullick and Jill Purdy, Resident Evil: Retribution; Sylvain Brassard, Stéphane Cadotte, Isabelle Favreau and Philippe Racine, Laurence Anyways; Allan Scarth, Bob Melanson, Zander Rosborough and Cory Tetford, The Disappeared
Achievement in Music: Original Score	Achievement in Music: Original Song
Howard Shore, Cosmopolis; Benoit Charest, Mars and April (Mars et Avril); Noia, Laurence Anyways; Don Rooke, Hugh Marsh and Michelle Willis, Still Mine; E. C. Woodley, Antiviral	Emily Haines, James Shaw and Howard Shore, "Long to Live" (Cosmopolis); Erland and the Carnival, "Wanting" (Rufus); Erland and the Carnival, "Out of Sight" (Rufus)
Make-Up	Achievement in Visual Effects
Colleen Quinton and Kathy Kelso, Laurence Anyways; Katie Brennan, Karola Dirnberger and Paul Jones, Silent Hill: Revelation 3D; Cathie Davies-Irvine and Trason Fernandes, Antiviral; Brenda Magalas and Lori Caputi, Goon; Marlène Rouleau and André Duval, L'Affaire Dumont	Dennis Berardi, Jason Edwardh, Matt Glover, Trey Harrell, Leann Harvey, Jo Hughes, Ethan Lee, Scott Riopelle, Eric Robinson and Kyle Yoneda, Resident Evil: Retribution; Dennis Berardi, Keith Acheson, Michael Borrett, Wilson Cameron, Michael DiCarlo, Tom Nagy, Britton Plewes, Scott Riopelle, Matt Whelan and Wojciech Zielinski, Silent Hill: Revelation 3D; Carlos Monzon, Martin Belleau, Dominic Daigle, Nathalie Dupont, Gaël Hollard, Benoît Ladouceur, Viviane Levesque Bouchard, Jérémie Lodomez, Anie Normandin and Alexandra Vaillancourt, Mars and April (Mars et Avril); Ève Brunet, Marc Morissette and Alexandra Vaillancourt, War Witch (Rebelle); Ralph Maiers, Debora Dunphy, John Fukushima, Patrick Kavanaugh, Bill Martin, Chris Philips, Jeremy Price, Kenton Rannie and Lauren Weidel, Midnight's Children
Claude Jutra Award	Golden Reel Award
Jason Buxton, Blackbird	Resident Evil: Retribution

== Television ==
=== Programs ===
Drama series	Comedy series
Flashpoint; Arctic Air; Bomb Girls; Continuum; King	Less Than Kind; Good God; Kenny Hotz's Triumph of the Will; Michael: Tuesdays and Thursdays; Mr. D
Animated program or series	Documentary program or series
Producing Parker; Almost Naked Animals; Jack; Rated A for Awesome	The Nature of Things; Lone Twin; Metal Evolution; Pyros; Trashopolis
Children's or youth fiction	Children's or youth non-fiction
Degrassi; The Haunting Hour; Mudpit; That's So Weird!; What's Up Warthogs!	Artzooka!; Finding Stuff Out; Giver; The Next Star; Run Run Revolution
Dramatic Mini-Series or TV Movie	History or Biography Documentary Program or Series
Magic Beyond Words; Cyberbully; Sunshine Sketches of a Little Town; The Wrath of Grapes: The Don Cherry Story II	D-Day to Victory; Battle Castle; Curse of the Axe; Darkness and Hope: Depression, Sports and Me; Extraordinary Canadians
International Drama	Lifestyle Program or Series
The Borgias; The Crimson Petal and the White; Titanic: Blood and Steel	Income Property; Chuck's Day Off; Eat St.; Hell on Hooves; Pitchin' In
Music, Variety, Sketch Comedy or Talk Program or Series	Performing Arts or Arts Documentary Program or Series
Rick Mercer Report; 2012 MuchMusic Video Awards; Battle of the Blades; Canada Sings; 2012 Juno Awards	Love Shines; The Captains; Into the Arctic II; Love Lies Bleeding; Romeos and Juliets
Pre-School Program or Series	Reality/Competition Program or Series
Stella & Sam; Are We There Yet?: World Adventure; Franklin and Friends; My Big Big Friend	Dragons' Den; Canada's Greatest Know-It-All; Canada's Handyman Challenge; The Real Housewives of Vancouver; Redemption Inc.
Science or Nature Documentary Program or Series	Social/Political Documentary Program (Donald Brittain Award)
The Nature of Things: "Polar Bears: A Summer Odyssey"; Descending; The Nature of Things: "The Perfect Runner"; The Nature of Things: "Smarty Plants: Uncovering the Secret World of Plant Behavior"; When Dreams Take Flight	About Her; 8th Fire; The Market; Prosecutor; The Team
Board of Directors' Tribute	Canada Award
Flashpoint	Blind Spot: What Happened to Canada's Aboriginal Fathers?

=== Actors ===
Lead actor, drama	Lead actress, drama
Enrico Colantoni, Flashpoint; Andra Fuller, The L.A. Complex; Elias Koteas, Combat Hospital; Luke Mably, Combat Hospital; Steven Cree Molison, Blackstone	Meg Tilly, Bomb Girls; Erica Durance, Saving Hope; Erin Karpluk, Being Erica; Amy Price-Francis, King; Emily Rose, Haven
Lead actor, comedy	Lead actress, comedy
Gerry Dee, Mr. D; Ryan Belleville, Almost Heroes; Shaun Majumder, This Hour Has 22 Minutes; Bob Martin, Michael: Tuesdays and Thursdays; Martin Short, I, Martin Short, Goes Home	Wendel Meldrum, Less Than Kind; Jennifer Irwin, Michael: Tuesdays and Thursdays, "Heights"; Cathy Jones, This Hour Has 22 Minutes; Natalie Lisinska, InSecurity; Tommie-Amber Pirie, Michael: Tuesdays and Thursdays
Lead actor, television film or miniseries	Lead actress, television film or miniseries
Shawn Doyle, John A.: Birth of a Country; Jared Keeso, The Wrath of Grapes: The Don Cherry Story II; Donal Logue, Sunshine Sketches of a Little Town; Tim Rozon, Befriend and Betray	Emily Osment, Cyberbully; Jill Hennessy, Sunshine Sketches of a Little Town; Poppy Montgomery, Magic Beyond Words
Supporting actor, drama	Supporting actress, drama
Peter Outerbridge, John A.: Birth of a Country; Michael Cram, Flashpoint; Sergio Di Zio, Flashpoint; Ryan Kennedy, Hannah's Law; Peter Mooney, Camelot	Wendy Crewson, Saving Hope; Georgina Lightning, Blackstone; Enuka Okuma, Rookie Blue; Kelly Rowan, Cyberbully; Ksenia Solo, Lost Girl
Supporting actor, comedy	Supporting actress, comedy
Stuart Margolin, Call Me Fitz; Benjamin Ayres, Less Than Kind; Tyler Johnston, Less Than Kind; Ross McMillan, Less Than Kind; Jason Weinberg, Good God	Joanna Cassidy, Call Me Fitz; Keana Bastidas, The Yard; Samantha Bee, Good God; Catherine Fitch, Living in Your Car; Jud Tylor, Good God
Actor, performing arts or miniseries (individual or ensemble)	Performance in a Variety or Sketch Comedy Program or Series (Individual or Ensemble)
Christopher Plummer, The Tempest; Guillaume Cote, Romeos and Juliets; Elena Lobsanov, Romeos and Juliets; Alberta Ballet Company, Love Lies Bleeding	Rick Mercer, Rick Mercer Report; Dallas Green, Juno Awards of 2012; Jonny Harris, Comedy Now!; Perry Perlmutar, Comedy Now!; Darrin Rose, Comedy Now!
Guest actor, drama series	Performance in an animated program or series
Gordon Pinsent, Republic of Doyle: "Mirror Mirror"; Katie Boland, The Listener: "She Sells Sanctuary: Lauren Collins, Being Erica: "Baby Mama"; Aaron Douglas, Flashpoint: "Day Game"; Jessica Steen, Flashpoint: "A New Life"	Seán Cullen, Almost Naked Animals: "Horn Swoggled"; Kim Cattrall, Producing Parker: "How Green Is My Parker?"; Brian Drummond, Rated A for Awesome: "Scary Go-Round 110B"; Patrick McKenna, Crash Canyon: "Poker Night"; Chiara Zanni, Rated A for Awesome: "Scary Go-Round 110B"
Performance, children's or youth	Host, pre-school, children's or youth
Melinda Shankar, How to Be Indie; Charlotte Arnold, Degrassi; Dylan Everett, Degrassi; Jahmil French, Degrassi; Aislinn Paul, Degrassi	Jeremie Saunders, Artzooka!; Adam Christie, Zoink'd; Gisèle Corinthios, Gisèle's Big Backyard; Michael Lagimodiere, Giver; Adamo Ruggiero, The Next Star

=== News ===
Breaking news coverage	Breaking news reportage, local
Jennifer Sheepy, Layal El Abdallah, Paul Bisson, Gerry Buffett, Patricia Craigen, Seema Patel, Marc Riddell, Bill Thornberry (CBC News Now), Death of Jack Layton; Julie Clow, Mark Bulgutch, Sharon Musgrave (CBC Prince Edward Island), PEI Votes 2011; Nancy Kelly, Tania Dahiroc, Rona Martell (CBC News Now), Death of Moammar Qaddafi; Kathleen O'Keefe, Irena Hrzina, James Shutsa, Kelly Todd (CityNews), Eaton Centre Shooting; Doriana Temolo, Mike Gill, Bryan Grahn, Francis Silvaggio, Shelly Sorochuk (Global National), Johnsons Landing Landslide	John Lancaster and Nil Köksal (CBC News Toronto), Mariam Makhniashvili; Lynn Douris, Omar Dabaghi-Pacheco and Marni Kagan (CBC News Ottawa), School Explosion
Breaking news reportage, national	Local newscast
Adrienne Arsenault (CBC News: The National), Attawapiskat; Robert Fife and Philip Ling (CTV News), Mackay Helicopter Investigation; Susan Ormiston (CBC News: The National), Syrian civil war; Jennifer Tryon, Kieron O'Dea and Trevor Owens (Global National), Algo Centre Mall; John Vennavally-Rao (CTV News), Aurora, Colorado shooting	News Hour (Global Toronto); CBC News Vancouver; CBC News: Nova Scotia at 6; CityNews; News Hour (Global BC)
National newscast	News information series
CBC News: The National; CTV National News; Global National	the fifth estate; 16:9; Connect with Mark Kelley; W5; Marketplace
News anchor	Host or interviewer, news or information program or series
Peter Mansbridge, The National; Dawna Friesen, Global National; Chris Gailus, Global BC News Hour; Lisa LaFlamme, CTV National News; Leslie Roberts, Global Toronto News	David Suzuki, The Nature of Things: "Journey to the Disaster Zone: Japan 3-11"; Wab Kinew, 8th Fire; Victor Malarek, W5; Peter Mansbridge, Mansbridge One on One; Lloyd Robertson, W5: "Murder for Love"
Host or interviewer, variety, lifestyle, reality/competition, performing arts or talk program or series
George Stroumboulopoulos, George Stroumboulopoulos Tonight: "John Irving/Regis Philbin/Haiti Special"; Cheryl Hickey, Entertainment Tonight Canada: "Michael Bublé"; William Shatner, Juno Awards of 2012; Martin Short, Long Story Short: CBC Turns 75; Les Stroud, Survivorman: "Tiburon Island Desert"

=== Sports ===
Live sporting event coverage	Sports analysis or commentary
TSN, London 2012 Olympic Games; TSN, 2011 Vanier Cup; TSN, 2012 World Junior Ice Hockey Championships; CBC Television, Hockey Night in Canada	Ken Volden, Gord Cutler, Bill Dodson, Linda Tremblay (TSN, London 2012 Olympic Games); Trevor Pilling, Sherali Najak, Brian Spear, Hockey Night in Canada: Scotiabank Hockey Tonight; Mark Milliere, Matt Dunn, Ken Volden, John Candy: True Double Blue; Don Metz, Gord Redel, Oil Change - Overdrive; Michael Dodson, Bob Babinski, Brian Spear, Scotiabank Hockey Day in Canada 2012
Sports host or analyst	Sports play-by-play
Brian Williams, 2012 Olympic Games; James Duthie, TSN Hockey: "NHL All-Star Fantasy Draft"; Glenn Healy, Hockey Night in Canada; Ron Maclean, Hockey Night in Canada; Scott Russell, CBC Sports Weekend	Rod Smith, 2012 Olympic Games; Rod Black, 2011 Vanier Cup; Bob Cole, Hockey Night in Canada; Jim Hughson, Hockey Night in Canada
Sports feature segment	
Josh Shiaman, Brent Blanchard, Stephen Brunt, Alison Redmond and Don Young, 2012 Olympic Games: "Opening Essay"; Mike Farrell and Ken Volden, SportsCentre: "Maria Toor Pakay"; Ken Volden and Josh Shiaman, SportsCentre: "Odell Willis"; Karen Zylak, Kara Lang, Alison Redmond and Don Young, 2012 Olympic Games: "Christine Sinclair"

=== Craft awards ===
Editorial research	Visual research
Angela Gilbert, The Fifth Estate: "Scout's Honour"; Scott Calbeck, Raw Opium; Jennifer Clibbon, Lisa Ellenwood, David Wells and Sylvene Gilchrist, Love, Hate & Propaganda: The Cold War; Marlene McArdle, Marketplace; David Ridgen, Confession to Murder	Darren Yearsley, Love, Hate & Propaganda: The Cold War; Caitriona Cantillon and Laura Blaney, Inventions That Shook the World; Michelle Demeyere, Titanic: The Canadian Story; Eliot Galan, Jordan Paterson, Denise Fong and Junrong Du, From C to C: Chinese Canadian Stories of Migration; Jessica Joy Wise, What's in a Name?
Make-Up	Costume Design
Erik Gosselin and Emilie Gauthier, Being Human: "When I Think About You, I Shred Myself"; Catherine Davies, Combat Hospital: "Triage"; Catherine Davies and David Scott, Combat Hospital: "On the Brink"; Debi Drennan, Murdoch Mysteries: "Murdoch in Wonderland"; Sue Upton, Stella Margaritis, Melissa Zimmerman and Judi Cooper-Sealy, I, Martin Short, Goes Home	Joanne Hansen, Bomb Girls: "Jumping Tracks"; Debra Hanson, The Firm: "Chapter 3"; Christina McQuarrie, Sanctuary: "Tempus"; Heather Neale, Todd and the Book of Pure Evil: "The Toddyssey"; Wendy Partridge, Hannah's Law
Photography in a comedy series	Photography in a documentary program or factual series
Ian Bibby, Call Me Fitz: "Hell Hath No Drink Limit"; Douglas Koch, Michael: Tuesdays and Thursdays: "Vomiting"; Ken Krawczyk, InSecurity: "Anger Management"; Mark Marek, Kenny Hotz's Triumph of the Will: "Rags to Bitches"; Michael Marshall, Todd and the Book of Pure Evil: "Two Girls, One Tongue"	Adam Ravetch, The Nature of Things: "Polar Bears: A Summer Odyssey"; André Dupuis, Descending: "The Sea Less Travelled"; Mike McLaughlin and Daron Donahue, The Nature of Things: "The Perfect Runner"; Derek Rogers, Explosion 1812; Chris Romeike, The Team
Photography in a drama program or series	Photography in a lifestyle or reality program or series
Paul Sarossy, The Borgias: "The Borgia Bull"; Éric Cayla, Bomb Girls: "Jumping Tracks"; David Greene, XIII: The Series: "Pilot"; Stephen Jackson, The Wrath of Grapes: The Don Cherry Story II; Gavin Smith, Combat Hospital: "Triage"	Jason Tan, From Spain with Love with Annie Sibonney: "Basque Country"; Stuart James Cameron, Deals from the Darkside: "Houdini Handcuffs"; Geoffrey Denham and Alex Nadon, Top Chef Canada: "Food Through the Ages"; Josh Moody, Saw Dogs: "Gone Fishing"; Stephen Taylor, The Cupcake Girls: "Rules of Engagement"
Photography in a variety or sketch comedy program or series	Editing in a comedy, variety or performing arts program or series
Dylan Macleod and Pierre Marleau, Love Lies Bleeding; Vincent Colbert and Jean Renaud, So You Think You Can Dance Canada; Dave Fairfield and James Downey, 2012 MuchMusic Video Awards; Alex Nadon, Juno Awards of 2012; Vincent Scotti, Secrets of Montréal: Cultural Gems	Craig Webster, Less Than Kind: "Fugue State"; Trevor Ambrose and Roderick Deogrades, Good God: "One Station Under God"; Miles Davren and Allan Maclean, Rick Mercer Report: "Season 9, Episode 1"; John Reynolds, Garry Tutte, Aren Hansen, Daniel Sadler and Ken Yan, Canada Sings: "Toronto Zoo vs. 1-800 Got Junk?"; Glenn Sakatch, Love Lies Bleeding
Editing in a documentary program or series	Editing in a dramatic program or series
Robert Swartz, When Dreams Take Flight; Alvin Campana, Descending; Jordan Paterson, From C to C: Chinese Canadian Stories of Migration; Eduardo Martinez, Love Shines; Jeanne Slater, Gastown Gamble: "Boozecan Blues"	Brett Sullivan, Flashpoint: "Grounded"; Jean Coulombe, The Listener: "The Bank Job"; Teresa Hannigan, Rookie Blue: "Every Man"; Jane Kass, The Firm: "Pilot"; Lara Mazur, The Pastor's Wife
Editing in an information program or series	Production design/art direction in a fiction program or series
Jonathan Wong, 16x9: The Bigger Picture: "Getting Into Cirque"; Kyle Martin, Derek Esposito, Nick Taylor and Seth Poulin, Top Chef Canada: "Food Through the Ages"; Jonathon L. Stewart and Justin Hall, Mantracker: "Shane & Brook"; Julian Wierzbicki, Chris Cassino and Robert Doughty, Run Run Revolution	Aidan Leroux, Bomb Girls: "Jumping Tracks"; Ian Brock, Lost Girl: "Something Wicked This Fae Comes"; Rob Gray, Rosalie Board and Dennis Davenport, Combat Hospital: "Do No Harm"; Stephen Roloff, Sunshine Sketches of a Little Town; Stephen Stanley and Gabriel Lamb, The L.A. Complex: "Taking the Day"
Production design/art direction in a non-fiction program or series	Sound in a comedy, variety or performing arts program or series
Adrian Greenlaw, Inventions That Shook the World: "The 1920s"; Andrew Berry, Perfect Storms: Disasters That Changed the World; Glen Charles Landry, 19th Annual National Aboriginal Achievement Awards; Graeme Morphy, Splatalot!: "Country Style"; Nancy Niksic, Christine Choi, Andrew Kinsella and Kyle Sanvictores, A Russell Peters Christmas Special; Michael Spike Parks, 2011 MuchMusic Video Awards	Marilee Yorston, Stan Mak, Brad Thornton, Katie Halliday, Mark Gingras, Rudy Michael and Elma Bello, Todd and the Book of Pure Evil: "Black Tie Showdown"; Norm Lussier, The Solstice Concerts; Michael Mancuso, Sean Pearson, Dante Winkler and Scott McCrorie, Detentionaire: "Dudes of Darkness"; Anthony Montano and Doug McClement, 2011 MuchMusic Video Awards; Philip Stall, Sue Conley, Joe Morrow, Jane Tattersall, Sid Lieberman and Kirk Lynds, Michael: Tuesdays and Thursdays: "Bridges"
Sound in a drama program or series	Sound in an information program or series
Kirk Lynds, Andrew Jablonski, David McCallum, Dale Sheldrake, Jack Heeren, Andy Malcolm, Don White, Goro Koyama, Yuri Gorbachow, Martin Lee and Jane Tattersall, The Borgias: "The Borgia Bull"; Pierre Blain, The Crimson Petal and the White; Yuri Gorbachow, Andy Malcolm, David McCallum, Goro Koyama, Steph Carrier, Ian Rankin, Jane Tattersall, Dale Sheldrake, Jack Heeren, Don White and Sue Conley, Camelot: "Reckoning"; Steve Hammond, Zenon Waschuk, Mike Woroniuk, Joe Mancuso, Michael Baskerville, Janice Ierulli, Mark Shnuriwsky and Richard Calistan, Flashpoint: "Day Game"; Bill McMillan, Steve Baine, Kevin Banks, Steph Carrier, Sue Conley, Paul Germann, Martin Lee and Lou Solakofski, Rookie Blue: "Butterflies"	Melodie Vaughan, Margus Jukkum, Richard Spence-Thomas and Gary Vaughan, Museum Secrets: "Inside the Imperial War Museum"; Stephen Barden, Ryan Ongaro and Tyler Whitham, Descending: "The Smoking Earth"; Perry Blackman, Brett Ardiel, Jamie Kidd and Larry MacDonald, Lost Years: A People's Struggle for Justice; Howard Rissin, John Schritt and Russ Dyck, The Nature of Things: "Smarty Plants: Uncovering the Secret World of Plant Behavior"; Jo Rossi, Art Young and Pablo Villegas, Pyros: "Blame it on Rio (For Auld Lang Syne)"
Visual effects	Casting
Adam Stern, Continuum: "A Stitch in Time"; Maxime Entringer, Marie-Eve Bedard-Tremblay, Cynthia Carrier, David Raymond, Aélis Héraud, Jean-Francois Lafleur, Pierre-Simon Lebrun-Chaput, Vanessa Delarosbil, Gabriel Morin and Dominic Marcotte, Being Human: "The Ties That Bind"; Stevie Ramone, Doug Campbell, Irit Hod, Kirk Brillon, Jim Maxwell, Tim Sibley, Adam Jewett, Ahmed Shehata, Luke Groves and Bill Halliday, The Borgias: "The Choice"; Tom Turnbull, Ian Britton, Colin Davies, Amy Daye, Eric Doiron, Peter Giliberti, Ariel Joson, Ian MacLeod, Chris Nokes and Mayur Patel, Titanic; Patrik Witzmann, Bret Culp, Julian Parry, Brian A. Smeets, Maria A. Gordon, Peter Lee, Bryan Luren, Jun Yue, Ryan Smith and Alphonso Young, Camelot: "The Sword and the Crown"	Jim Heber, Jenny Lewis and Sara Kay, Todd and the Book of Pure Evil: "B.Y.O.B.O.P.E."; Jon Comerford and Lisa Parasyn, Lost Girl: "Barometz. Trick. Pressure"; Jon Comerford and Lisa Parasyn, The Yard: "The Economy"; Rhonda Fisecki, Blackstone: "Forgiveness"; Sherry Thomas, Jenny Lewis, Sara Kay and Sharon Bialy, The Firm: "Pilot"

=== Directing ===
Animated program or series	Children's or youth
Robin Budd, Producing Parker: "How Green Was My Parker"; Neil Affleck, Mike the Knight: "The Knight Hider/Trollee's Sleepover"; Brad Ferguson, Almost Naked Animals: "The Green Banana"; Joey So, Sidekick: "House of Helmut/Supermodels"	Phil Earnshaw, Degrassi: The Next Generation: "Scream, Part 2"; Derby Crewe, Wingin' It: "Friday Afternoon Fever"; Neill Fearnley, R. L. Stine's The Haunting Hour: "Lights Out"; Brian K. Roberts, My Babysitter's a Vampire: "Three Geeks and a Demon"; Nadine Schwartz, Run Run Revolution
Comedy	Documentary program or series
Sheri Elwood, Call Me Fitz: "Hell Hath No Drink Limit"; Ken Finkleman, Good God: "One Station Under God"; Kelly Makin, Less Than Kind: "Fugue State"; Patricia Rozema, Michael: Tuesdays and Thursdays: "Ridicule"	Erna Buffie, The Nature of Things: "Smarty Plants Uncovering the Secret World of Plant Behavior; Matt Gallagher, Grinders; Marc de Guerre, Who's Sorry Now?; Jordan Paterson, From C to C: Chinese Canadian Stories of Migration; Patrick Reed, The Team
Dramatic program or mini–series	Dramatic series
Jerry Ciccoritti, John A.: Birth of a Country; Norma Bailey, The Pastor's Wife; Charles Binamé, Cyberbully; Paul A. Kaufman, Magic Beyond Words: The J.K. Rowling Story	Jim Donovan, Flashpoint: "A Day in the Life"; Jon Cassar, Continuum: "A Stitch in Time"; Laurie Lynd, Murdoch Mysteries: "Dead End Street"; Adrienne Mitchell, Bomb Girls: "Jumping Tracks"; Kari Skogland, The Listener: "She Sells Sanctuary"
Lifestyle program or mini–series	Performing arts program or series
Dale Burshtein and Henry Less, From Spain with Love with Annie Sibonney: "Seafood to Die For"; Jameel Bharmal, Gamechangers: "Smartsight"; Peter Waal, Eat St.: "The Italian Job"; Karen Yarofsky, Buy Herself: "Bali"	Douglas Arrowsmith, Love Shines; Des McAnuff, The Tempest; Moze Mossanen, Romeos & Juliets
Reality or competition program or series	Variety or sketch comedy program or series
Graeme Lynch, Undercover Boss Canada: "FedEx"; Joseph Blasioli, Handyman Superstar Challenge: "Two for One"; Greg Donis, Saw Dogs: "Masquerave"; Dave Russell, Canada's Smartest Person; Frank Samson, Top Chef Canada: "Into the Wild"	John Keffer, 2012 MuchMusic Video Awards; Dana Andersen and Francis Damberger, Caution: May Contain Nuts; Trevor Grant, The Candy Show: "Tied Up, Tied Down"; Dave Russell, Juno Awards of 2012; Rae Upton, 19th Annual Aboriginal Achievement Awards
Live sporting event	News information program or series
Ron Forsyth, Hockey Night in Canada: Stanley Cup Finals, Game 7; Paul Hemming, 2012 IIHF World Junior Hockey Championship Semi-Final; Dawn Landis, 2011 Vanier Cup	Carmen Merrifield and Claude Vickery, The Fifth Estate: "Truth & Lies: The Last Days of Osama bin Laden"; Mike Belley, Oil Change: "Episode 1"; Kathleen Coughlin, Marketplace: "When the Repairman Knocks"; Timothy Sawa, The Fifth Estate: "Scout's Honour"; Brian Sobie, The Extra Yard: Inside the 2011 Argos: "Episode 1"

=== Music ===
Non-fiction program or series	Original score for a program
Justin Small and Ohad Benchetrit, Semisweet: Life in Chocolate; Darren Fung, Lost Years: A People's Struggle for Justice; Rob Horvath and Roy Oommen, Journey to Christmas: "Following the Star"; Ken Myhr, The Market; Jay Semko, Dust Up: "It Looked Like Death"	Jonathan Goldsmith, Titanic; Jay McCarrol, I, Martin Short, Goes Home; Jeff Toyne, Magic Beyond Words: The J.K. Rowling Story; Asher Lenz and Stephen Skratt, Sunshine Sketches of a Little Town
Original score for a series	
Ari Posner and Amin Bhatia, Flashpoint: "Day Game"; Jeff Danna, Continuum: "A Stitch in Time"; Dylan Heming and Richard Pell, Call Me Fitz: "How Do You Say..."; Paul Intson, Scaredy Squirrel: "Perfect Pickle/Goat Police"; Trevor Yuile, Being Erica: "Dr. Erica"

=== Writing ===
Children's or youth	Comedy
Frank Van Keeken, Wingin' It: "Hands Solo"; Paul Gardner, Gisèle's Big Backyard: "Movie Moments"; Dennis Jackson and Melanie Jackson, Wapos Bay: "Long Goodbyes"; Terry McGurrin, Scaredy Squirrel: "From Rodent with Love"; Alex McIntosh, James May's Things You Need to Know: "Weather"	Mark McKinney, Less Than Kind: "Play It Again, Sam"; Jenn Engels, Less Than Kind: "Reparations and Renewal"; Mark McKinney and Garry Campbell, Less Than Kind: "March Fourth"; Charles Picco, Todd and the Book of Pure Evil: "Two Girls, One Tongue"; Matt Watts, Michael: Tuesdays and Thursdays: "Bridges"
Documentary	Dramatic program or miniseries
Sheona McDonald, When Dreams Take Flight; Mick Grogan, Explosion 1812; Jefferson Lewis, Extraordinary Canadians: "Lewis DeSoto on Emily Carr"; Tom Radford and Niobe Thompson, The Nature of Things: "The Perfect Runner"; Barry Stevens, Prosecutor	Bruce A. Smith, John A.: Birth of a Country; Teena Booth, Cyberbully; Malcolm MacRury, Sunshine Sketches of a Little Town; Andrew Wreggitt, The Wrath of Grapes: The Don Cherry Story II
Drama series	Lifestyle or reality/competition program or series
Aubrey Nealon, Flashpoint: "Day Game"; Emily Andras, Lost Girl: "Into the Dark"; Simon Barry, Continuum: "A Stitch in Time"; Aaron Martin and Jana Sinyor, Being Erica: "Dr. Erica"; Gregory Nelson, Rookie Blue: "A Good Shoot"	Les Stroud, Survivorman: "Tiburon Island Desert"; Claire Cappelletti, In Real Life: "Army Recruits"; Ron Carroll, Undercover Boss Canada: "Cineplex"; Douglas Hudema, Hell on Hooves: "Moustache Power"
Variety or sketch comedy program or series
Greg Eckler, Rick Mercer, Rick Currie, Tim Steeves, Chris Finn and George Westerholm, Rick Mercer Report; Paul Bates and Adam Nicholls, Long Story Short: CBC Turns 75; Sheldon Elter, Howie Miller, Ryan Parker, Jeff Halaby, Mark Meer, Dana Andersen, Aimée Beaudoin and Matthew Alden, Caution: May Contain Nuts; Duncan McKenzie, Gary Pearson, Jerry Schaefer, Alana Johnston, James Hartnett, Jan Caruana and Mike Allison, That's So Weird!; Kristeen Von Hagen, Russell Peters, Jean Paul, Clayton Peters and Luciano Casimiri, A Russell Peters Christmas Special

== Digital media ==
Original Program or Series, Fiction	Cross-Platform Project, Fiction
Guidestones (iThentic, 3 o'clock.tv): Jonas Diamond, Lisa Baylin, Jeremy Diamond, Jay Ferguson, Denny Silverthorne, Catherine Talt; Out With Dad (JLeaver Presentations): Jason Leaver; Prison Dancer: The Interactive Web Musical (Prison Dancer Web Inc.): Ana Serrano, Romeo Candido, Carmen De Jesus; Space Janitors (Space Mop): Geoff Lapaire, Davin Lengyel; What Are the Sevens? (Secret Location): James Milward, Ryan Andal, José Lourenço, Pietro Gagliano, Ashlee Lougheed	The Drunk and On Drugs Happy Fun Time Hour (Happy Funtime Productions 2007): Paul Pope, Colin Busby, Victoria Ha, Dana Herlihey, Evan Jones, Stephen MacLeod; Bomb Girls Interactive (Secret Location, Shaw Media): James Milward, Susan Alexander, Ryan Andal, Noora Abu Eitah, Marty Flanagan, Pietro Gagliano, Lori Harito, Chris Harris; Murdoch Mysteries: The Curse of the Lost Pharaohs (Shaftesbury Films): Shane Kinnear, Jay Bennett, Daniel Dales, Christina Jennings, Jarrett Sherman; Rookie Blue: The Interrogation Room (Secret Location): James Milward, Noora Abu Eitah, Marty Flanagan, Chris Harris; Titanic - The Ultimate Immersive Experience (Chocolate Liberation Front, Lookout Point, ITV Studios, Bell Fund, Sienna Films): Shelley Simmons, Arthur Cormac, Evan Doherty, Mclean Greaves, Laura Stitzel
Original Program or Series, Non-Fiction	Cross-Platform Project, Non-Fiction
One Millionth Tower (National Film Board of Canada): Katerina Cizek, Sarah Arruda, Silva Basmajian, Gerry Flahive; Bar Code (National Film Board of Canada, ARTE France): Hugues Sweeney, David Carzon, Marianne Levy-Leblond, Rob McLaughlin, Joel Ronez; Bear 71 (National Film Board of Canada): Loc Dao, David Christensen, Dana Dansereau, Rob McLaughlin, Bonnie Thompson; Exile Without End: Palestinians in Lebanon (CBC News, Radio-Canada, ALT Productions): Pierre Champoux, Nahlah Ayed, Danny Braun, Ahmed Kouaou, Marissa Nelson, Rachel Nixon, Kazi Stastna, Aida Zenova; Masa Off Grid (High Fidelity HDTV Media Inc.): Lori DeGraw, Kate Abraham, Crista Bazos, Laura Hepes, Masa Takei	Truth & Lies: The Last Days of Osama bin Laden (CBC News, the fifth estate, Sean Embury, Fulscrn Digital Media Communications): Rachel Nixon, Marie Caloz, Marissa Nelson, Robert Sheppard, Jim Williamson; D-Day to Victory (Secret Location): James Milward, Ryan Andal, Noora Abu Eitah, Pietro Gagliano; 8th Fire (CBC): Annette Bradford, Jennifer Clibbon, Kelly Crichton, Phillip Djwa, Carole G. Gagnon, Jean Simard; #FAQMP (Stornoway Communications): Rosemary Fusca, Martha Fusca, Patrick Hickey, Kevin O'Keefe, Karyn Pugliese, Pamela Ward; Kidnapped: The Search for Graham McMynn (CBC News, the fifth estate, Sean Embury, Fulscrn Digital Media Communications): Jim Williamson, Marie Caloz, Gary Graves, Amber Hildebrant, Marissa Nelson
Cross-Platform Project, Children's
My Babysitter's a Vampire: Humans vs. Vampires (Secret Location, Fresh TV): James Milward, Ryan Andal, Pietro Gagliano, Sabrina Saccoccio; Finding Stuff Out Online (Smiley Guy Studios): Jonas Diamond, Jeremy Diamond, Brad Sears, Denny Silverthorne; Franklin and Friends (Watch More TV Interactive): Caitlin O'Donovan, Patricia Lee, Marco Mucci, Emma Scratch, Adam Welsh; In Real Life (Secret Location): James Milward, Ryan Andal, Pietro Gagliano, Sabrina Saccoccio; Pillars of Freedom (Smiley Guy Studios, Nexus Media): Jonas Diamond, Jeremy Diamond, Donald Duchene, Brad Sears, Denny Silverthorne

== Multiple nominations and awards ==
Films that received multiple nominations
Nominations	Show
12	War Witch
10	Laurence Anyways
8	Midnight's Children
7	L'Affaire Dumont
7	Still Mine
6	Goon
5	Inch'Allah

Films that received multiple awards
Awards	Film
10	War Witch
2	Cosmopolis
2	Laurence Anyways
2	Midnight's Children

Shows that received multiple nominations
Nominations	Show
11	Flashpoint
10	Less Than Kind
8	Michael: Tuesdays and Thursdays
6	Bomb Girls
6	CBC News: The National
6	Combat Hospital
6	Degrassi
6	Good God
6	Hockey Night in Canada
6	London 2012 Olympic Games
6	Sunshine Sketches of a Little Town
6	Todd and the Book of Pure Evil
5	2012 Juno Awards
5	Call Me Fitz
5	Continuum
5	Cyberbully

Shows that received multiple awards
Awards	Show
7	Flashpoint
5	London 2012 Olympic Games
4	Call Me Fitz
4	CBC News: The National
4	John A.: Birth of a Country
4	Less Than Kind
3	Bomb Girls
3	The Borgias
3	the fifth estate
3	Rick Mercer Report

== Special awards ==
Several special awards were given:

- Academy Achievement Award: Jeanne Beker
- Academy Special Film Award: Victor Loewy
- Canada's Screen Star: Amber Marshall
- Digital Media Trailblazing Award: Andra Sheffer
- Exceptional Achievement in Canadian Film & Television: Ian Greenberg
- Gordon Sinclair Award: Laurier LaPierre
- Margaret Collier Award: Heather Conkie
- Outstanding Artistic Contribution to Film & Television: Kim Cattrall
- Outstanding Technical Achievement Award: IMAX Corporation
