= Keely and Du =

Theatrical play by Jane Martin

Keely and Du is a theatrical play by Jane Martin. The play centers on Keely, a rape victim who became pregnant from a sexual assault and is being held captive by an extremist anti-abortion cult to prevent her from terminating the pregnancy, and Du, the cult member who is guarding her.

The play was a finalist for the 1994 Pulitzer Prize. The United Kingdom première of the play was staged by the Royal Theatre, Northampton in 1995 with Joanna Foster as Keely and Vilma Hollingbery as Du.

== Film ==
A 2018 film adaptation by Canadian directors Dominique Cardona and Laurie Colbert transposed the play's setting to a remote wilderness cabin in Northern Ontario. It starred Laurence Leboeuf as Keely and Nancy Palk as Du, as well as Aidan Devine and Peter Mooney. The film had its theatrical premiere at the Cinéfest Sudbury International Film Festival in September 2018 as Keely and Du, and was subsequently screened at other film festivals under the title Catch and Release.
