= Shawn Doyle =

Canadian actor

- Doyle in 2026
- Born: September 19, 1968 (age 58); Wabush, Newfoundland and Labrador, Canada
- Occupation: Actor
- Years active: 1996–present

Shawn Doyle (born September 19, 1968) is a Canadian actor known for his roles in The Expanse, The Eleventh Hour, Big Love, 24, Desperate Housewives, and Star Trek: Discovery.

== Early life and education ==
Doyle was born and raised in Wabush, Newfoundland and Labrador. He was exposed to acting at a young age, as his father was the founder of a local theatre group. Later, he moved to Toronto to study theatre at York University.

== Career ==
He has won three awards for his critically acclaimed performance as Dennis Langley in The Eleventh Hour. Since moving to Los Angeles, he has also starred in the American shows 24 as Ronnie Lobell, Desperate Housewives as Mr. Hartley, and Big Love. He has also made several film appearances: as Jack Shepard in Frequency, Brian in 1998's Babyface, Stephen in the 2005 film Sabah, and as Ray in Grown Up Movie Star (which he co-produced). Other roles include John in the film adaptation of The Robber Bride and a lawyer in Lost. He had a recurring turn as Joey Henrickson, a former NFL player and brother of Bill Henrickson, the main character in the HBO series Big Love. He had a brief role on the short-lived but acclaimed FX series Terriers. He starred as agoraphobic chess genius Arkady Balagan in the Showcase original series Endgame. In the fall of 2011, he starred as the future first Canadian prime minister Sir John A. Macdonald in the CBC TV movie John A.: Birth of a Country. His performance won him a 2013 Canadian Screen Award for Best Performance by a Lead Actor in a television film or miniseries.

In 2012, he appeared in an episode of King. He has appeared in three episodes of Republic of Doyle as Carl Maher. He appeared in the Canadian film The Disappeared in the fall of 2012. He played in an episode of CBS's Vegas as FBI agent Patrick Byrne in 2013. In 2013, he began the recurring role of Isaac Taft on the Canada-based Syfy series Lost Girl. 2014 saw Doyle portray Aleksandre Belenko on Covert Affairs. He portrays Will Graham's defense attorney Leonard Brower on NBC's Hannibal, appeared as Chief of Police Vern Thurman on Fargo, and portrays Jackie Sharp's boyfriend (then later husband), Alan Cooke on House of Cards. In 2015, he appeared in a recurring role on This Life as high school principal, Andrew Wallace, and Sadavir Errinwright on the Syfy series The Expanse.

== Personal life ==
He married actress Allegra Fulton after they acted together in the short film The Hangman's Bride.

== Filmography ==
=== Film ===
Year	Title	Role	Notes
1996	The Hangman's Bride	Jean Corolère	
1996	Darkman III: Die Darkman Die	Adam	Direct-to-video film
1996	The Long Kiss Goodnight	Donlevy Bum Cop	
1997	Papertrail	Chuck Switzer	
1998	Babyface	Brian	
1998	Sleeping Dogs Lie	Hammond	
1999	Rabbit Punch	Sidney	
2000	Frequency	Jack Shepard	
2001	Alien Factor 2: The Alien Rampage	Mayor Henry Kidd	
2001	Knockaround Guys	Deputy Ward	
2001	Who Is Cletis Tout?	Crow Gollotti	
2001	Don't Say a Word	Russel Maddox	
2001	The Majestic	Federal Agent Saunders	
2005	Sabah	Stephen Montpellier	
2006	Mount Pleasant	Stephen Burrows	
2009	Whiteout	Sam Murphy	
2009	Grown Up Movie Star	Ray	
2012	The Disappeared	Pete	
2013	Hunting Season	Charlie	
2013	The Returned	Jacob	
2016	Away from Everywhere	Owen Collins	
2022	The Last Mark	Keele	
2022	Ashgrove	Elliot	
2025	Nika and Madison	Det. Warhurst	
2025	Youngblood	Murray Chadwick	
2026	The Voices of Our Mother	Father Roslovic	
2026	Last Moon	Father	

=== Television ===
Year	Title	Role	Notes
1993	Top Cops	Douglas	Episode: "Robert Sims-Reid/Andrew Lehocky and Arco"
1995–1996	Side Effects	Billy McFee	2 episodes
1996	Kung Fu: The Legend Continues	Mallory	Episode: "Storm Warning"
1996	Psi Factor	Brad Peck	Episode: "The Underneath/Phantom Limb"
1996	Giant Mine	Al Shearing	Television film
1998	The Last Don II	Bruno	2 episodes
1998	Earth: Final Conflict	Lazarus	Episode: "Moonscape"
1998	Due South	Dwight Jones	Episode: "Mountie Sings the Blues"
1999	Deep in the City	Det. McKeigan	6 episodes
1999	Storm of the Century	Lucien Fournier	2 episodes
1999	Foolish Heart	Brennon	Episode: "The Program"
2000	Who Killed Atlanta's Children?	Royal McCullough	Television film
2001	Blue Murder	Insp. Ray Denton	Episode: "Partners"
2001	Stiletto Dance	Anton Seaberg	Television film
2002	A Killing Spring	Detective Alex Emanuel	Television film
2002	Verdict in Blood	Detective Alex Emanuel	Television film
2002	Scar Tissue	Daniel Nevsky	Television film
2002–2005	The Eleventh Hour	Dennis Langley	9 episodes
2003	Do or Die	Det. Alan Yann	Television film
2004	Desperate Housewives	Mr Hartley	2 episodes
2004	CSI: Crime Scene Investigation	Archie Lopez	Episode: "Dead Ringer"
2005	24	Ronnie Lobell	2 episodes
2005	Blind Justice	Randy Lyman	Episode: "Pilot"
2006–2010	Big Love	Joey Henrickson	43 episodes
2006	Eight Days to Live	Tim Spring	Television film
2007	The Robber Bride	John Grismer	Television film
2008	Lost	Duncan Forrester	Episode "Eggtown"
2008	Numbers	Shane O'Hanahan	Episode: "When Worlds Collide"
2008	Rent-a-Goalie	Eustace Ridgeway	Episode: "He Man"
2009	Medium	Det. Brad Auerbach	2 episodes
2009	Guns	Rick Merriweather	2 episodes
2009	Dark Blue	Mike O'Neill	Episode: "Venice Kings"
2010	Lie To Me	Mike Salinger	Episode "In The Red"
2010	Terriers	Armand Foster	Episode: "Change Partners"
2010–2014	Republic of Doyle	Carl Maher	3 episodes
2011	John A.: Birth of a Country	John A. Macdonald	Television film
2011	Endgame	Arkady Balagan	13 episodes
2012	King	Pete Rivers	Episode: "Charlene Francis"
2012	Saving Hope	Scott Cockburn	Episode: "Out of Sight"
2012	Flashpoint	Brendan Rogan	Episode: "No Kind of Life"
2013	Lost Girl	Isaac Taft	4 episodes
2013	Vegas	Patrick Byrne	6 episodes
2013	King & Maxwell	Nikoloz Arziani	Episode: "Second Chances"
2013	Reign	Claude, Duke of Guise	2 episodes
2014	Lizzie Borden Took an Ax	Marshall Hilliard	Television film
2014	Hannibal	Leonard Brauer	Episode: "Hassun"
2014	The Listener	Samuel Murley	Episode: "The Wrong Man"
2014	Rookie Blue	Ted McDonald	3 episodes
2014	House of Cards	Dr. Alan Cooke	5 episodes
2014	Fargo	Vern Thurman	2 episodes
2014	Covert Affairs	Aleksandre Belenko	6 episodes
2015–2018	The Expanse	Sadavir Errinwright	27 episodes
2015	This Life	Andrew Wallace	10 episodes
2016–	Frontier	Samuel Grant	14 episodes
2017	Bellevue	Peter Welland	8 episodes
2017	Billions	Hank Flagg	Episode: "Indian Four"
2018	Impulse	Jeremiah Miller	8 episodes
2018	Ransom	Vincent Keough	Episode: "The Fawn"
2019	Unspeakable	Ben Landry	8 episodes
2020	The Detectives	Inspector Earl Peters	Episode: "Peters"
2020	Mirage	Doug Marsh	6 episodes
2020	Cardinal	Scott Riley	4 episodes
2020	The Comey Rule	E. W. Priestap	2 episodes
2021	Clarice	Therapist	2 episodes
2021–2022	Star Trek: Discovery	Dr. Ruon Tarka	8 episodes
2025–2026	Son of a Critch	Mr. Lewis	7 episodes
2026	Reacher	Leo Ahlquist	2 episodes
2026	Below	Walton Budgel	2 episodes

== Awards ==
Year	Award	Film/TV show	Role	Result	Ref.
2003	ACTRA Toronto Award for Outstanding Performance - Male	The Eleventh Hour	Dennis Langley	Nominated	
2004	Gemini Nomination for Outstanding Male Performance In A Leading Role	The Eleventh Hour	Dennis Langley	Nominated	
2005	Gemini Nomination for Outstanding Performance In A Guest-starring Role	The Eleventh Hour	Dennis Langley	Nominated	
2007	Gemini Award for Outstanding Male Performance In A Dramatic Program Or Miniseries	The Robber Bride	John Grismer	Won	
2013	Canadian Screen Award Best Performance by a Lead Actor in a television film or miniseries	John A.: Birth of a Country	John A. Macdonald	Won	
2013	ACTRA award for Outstanding Performance - Male	The Disappeared	Pete	Won	
