= Joseph Ziegler =

Joseph Ziegler may refer to:

- Joseph Ziegler (actor) (1953–2025), Canadian actor and theatre director
- Joseph Offenbach, born Joseph Ziegler, German actor
