= Margarita (2012 film) =

- Film poster
- Directed by: Laurie Colbert; Dominique Cardona
- Written by: Laurie Colbert; Dominique Cardona; Margaret Webb
- Produced by: Rechna Varma
- Starring: Nicola Correia-Damude; Patrick McKenna; Christine Horne; Maya Ritter
- Cinematography: D. Gregor Hagey
- Edited by: Phyllis Housen
- Music by: Germaine Franco
- Production company: Rechna Varma Productions
- Distributed by: Mongrel Media
- Release date: April 1, 2012 (Créteil)
- Running time: 90 minutes
- Country: Canada
- Language: English

Margarita is a Canadian comedy-drama film, directed by Laurie Colbert and Dominique Cardona and released in 2012. The film stars Nicola Correia-Damude as Margarita, a lesbian immigrant from Mexico who works as a nanny for a Toronto couple, but is placed at risk of deportation when their financial situation forces them to let her go. The cast includes Patrick McKenna and Claire Lautier as her employers Ben and Gail, Maya Ritter as their daughter Mali, and Christine Horne as Margarita's girlfriend.

The film premiered at the 2012 Créteil International Women's Film Festival.

== Critical response ==
Writing for the Toronto Star, Linda Barnard called the film a predictable domestic drama, but praised Correia-Damude for her performance. For The Globe and Mail, Liam Lacey wrote that the cast "works valiantly and the cinematography is crisp, but trite characterizations and an earnest-cutesy tone make this movie feel like too much domestic labour." Robert Bell of Exclaim! wrote that "Beyond the assertion that they understand the world's woes and can appreciate the altruistic and entirely loveable lower class, there's a contrary preoccupation with job title as key signifier of a person's importance. Much like the doctors in Finn's Girl, everyone, aside from Margarita, is a doctor, dentist or law student. While appropriate, since the majority of Toronto is convinced of their own importance, Colbert and Cardona are unaware of this irony or vulgar superficiality, instead demonstrating blind adherence to an amusing status quo."

== Awards ==
The film won the Audience Award for Best Feature Film at the 2012 Inside Out Film and Video Festival.
