= Cheryl McKenzie =

Canadian broadcast journalist

- Employer: APTN National News
- Awards: NAJA-Medill Milestone Achievement Award (2022)
- Website: aptn.ca/about/our-people/cheryl-mckenzie/

Cheryl McKenzie is a Canadian broadcast journalist and the Executive Director of News and Current Affairs for the APTN National News. She is of Anishinabek and Cree descent. She is best known as the host of the Aboriginal People's Television Network's half-hour nightly news show APTN National News, and the talk Show InFocus.

== Early life ==
Both McKenzie's parents are residential school survivors.

They are from the Hollow Water First Nation and Peguis First Nation in Manitoba.

Cheryl McKenzie grew up in Winnipeg, but frequently visited family on her parents' reserves. Cheryl's first career was as a chef. She worked in Winnipeg's number one–ranked restaurant, Amici, when she was still a teenager, aged 19. The grueling work schedule proved difficult after Cheryl became a single mother, and so she returned to school at the University of Winnipeg.

McKenzie enrolled initially in political science but was frustrated that the course excluded Indigenous peoples. She switched her major and graduated with a degree in philosophy in 1998.

== Career ==
=== CBC Radio ===
Cheryl briefly interned at CBC Radio Winnipeg in 2000. The internship ended after 10 months when the funding ran out. Also, her superiors at CBC told her they didn't think she would be successful as a journalist.

=== APTN ===
In 2001 Cheryl landed a job as a reporter at the Aboriginal People's Television Network's weekly news show, InVision, which was rebranded into APTN National News in 2003.

In 2004 McKenzie earned award nominations at the Geminis and the Canadian Association of Broadcasters for an investigative series of reports into the lives of First Nations people who became ill and in some cases died from asbestos-related illness after their homes were contaminated by the Department of Aboriginal Affairs.

==== APTN Daytime ====
In July 2005 McKenzie was promoted to Host/Producer for the launch of APTN National News: Daytime a second national half hour newscast. Announcing New Host and Producer For APTN National News.

==== APTN Contact ====
McKenzie assumed the role of host producer on the APTN national call-in show Contact in 2007.

==== APTN National News and InFocus ====
A new talk format show, APTN InFocus, replaced Contact in 2009, with McKenzie at the forefront as the host-producer.

McKenzie reappeared on the news, this time on the desk as a co-anchor with Michael Hutchison in 2012.

In the fall of 2014, InFocus reverted to a half-hour show. Topics have included: suicide rates, addiction, mental health issues, low income, community violence, high incarceration rates, and self-governance struggles.

APTN InFocus reformatted again in 2016, becoming a one-hour show, interactive as Contact had been but with a new focus on social media. The first episode on June 3, 2016, featured Prime Minister Justin Trudeau as a guest. It was the first time a serving prime minister ever gave a sit-down interview to an Indigenous media organization. Trudeau took questions via telephone and Twitter for an hour. The current design of the show usually features a three guest panel, and allows viewers to join the conversation via telephone Twitter or Facebook.

==== Executive Director of news and current affairs ====
McKenzie was promoted to executive director of news and current affairs on July 22, 2019, succeeding Karyn Pugliese, who departed on July 31, 2019.
