= Allegra Fulton =

Canadian actress

Allegra Fulton is a Canadian actress, best known for Frida K, a one-woman stage show in which she portrayed artist Frida Kahlo.

The daughter of filmmaker David Fulton and writer Gloria Montero, she began her acting career in childhood with an appearance on the children's television series Butternut Square. In the early 1980s she regularly performed in stage roles in Toronto, including productions of Slow Dance on the Killing Ground, Michi's Blood, and South of Heaven.

In 1991 she received a Dora Mavor Moore Award nomination for Outstanding Performance, Small Theatre for her performance in Nocturnal Emissions at Buddies in Bad Times.

In the 1990s she began appearing in film and television roles, most notably the Genie Award-winning short film The Hangman's Bride opposite Shawn Doyle, whom she subsequently married.

Frida K, written by Montero, directed by Peter Hinton-Davis was first staged at the 1994 Toronto Fringe Festival, before being remounted by Tarragon Theatre in 1995. In 1996 she won the Dora Mavor Moore Award for Outstanding Performance by a Female in a Play, Small Theatre, before taking the play on an extended national and international tour to Spain, Barcelona and more. She returned to Toronto in 1998 in the English-language premiere of Michel Tremblay's Marcel Pursued by the Hounds for Tarragon.

She has continued to act in stage, film, television and animated voice roles. She received a Gemini Award nomination for Best Performance by an Actress in a Guest Role Dramatic Series at the 16th Gemini Awards in 2001 for a guest appearance on Blue Murder, and received her third Dora nomination in 2020 for Between Riverside and Crazy.

== Filmography ==
=== Film ===
Year	Title	Role	Notes
1984	Unfinished Business	Script Assistant	
1991	Montréal vu par...	Invitée	
1993	Thirty Two Short Films About Glenn Gould	Waitress	
1996	Critical Choices	Teresa	
1997	The Hangman's Bride	Francoise Laurent	Short film
1999	Woman Wanted	Gracie	
2000	The Law of Enclosures	Henry's Mother	
2002	John Q.	Sick Girl's Mother	
2004	Childstar	Photographer	
2004	Choke.	Ms. Morgan	Short film
2004	Show Me	Sam	
2005	My Uncle Navy and Other Inherited Disorders	Pam	Short film
2007	Loonie	Angel	Short film
2012	A Dark Truth	Renaldo's Mom (voice)	
2012	Flaked		Short film
2013	Iris	(voice)	Short film
2014	Maps to the Stars	Harriet	
2016	Becoming Wigglesworth	Mona	Short film
2017	The Shape of Water	Yolanda	
2018	Hellmington	Maggie Owens	
2018	Nine Letters	Katherine	Short film
2019	Run This Town	Susan	
2019	Strange But True	Chantrel	
2021	Origins	Linda	Short film
2022	Photo Booth	Narrator (voice)	
2022	R.O.I.	Ms. Koslov	Short film
2023	Cascade	Skip	
2024	Monica's News	Hazel McClure	
2024	Taken in Plain Sight	Dolores	Lifetime (TV channel) film

=== Television ===
Year	Title	Role	Notes
1992	E.N.G.	Mrs. Fonseca	1 episode
1993	Top Cops	Brenna Neinast	1 episode
1994	RoboCop	Wilson	1 episode
1995	Forever Knight	Nurse #1	1 episode
1995	Dark Eyes	Vicki	1 episode
1996	Jack Reed: Death and Vengeance	Sharon Plessy	TV movie
1996	Holiday Affair		TV movie
1997	Too Close to Home	Gloria Lopez	TV movie
1997	Ms. Scrooge	Marie	TV movie
1997	Balls Up	Michelle	TV movie
1998	Stickin' Around	Mrs. Salazar (voice)	1 episode
1999	Animorphs	Visser One	3 episodes
1999	Black and Blue	Patty Bancroft	TV movie
1999–2000	Blaster's Universe	Additional Voices (voice)	13 episodes
1999–2001	Angela Anaconda	Multiple voices	34 episodes
2000	Wind at My Back	Lucille	1 episode
2000	Twitch City	Therapist	1 episode
2000	Dirty Pictures	Angela	TV movie
2000	Relic Hunter	Airport Desk Agent	1 episode
2001	And Never Let Her Go	Eleonor Blanchard	TV movie
2001, 2004	Blue Murder	Louise Vuceta, Ms. Bell	3 episodes
2002	The Associates	Mrs. Shanfelt	2 episodes
2002	Two Against Time	Theresa	TV movie
2002–2003	Street Time	Ann Valentine	15 episodes
2004	Celeste in the City	Hilly	TV movie
2004	The Wonderful World of Disney	Carmen	1 episode
2005	Puppets Who Kill	Esmerelda	1 episode
2005	Riding the Bus with My Sister	Vera	TV movie
2005–2009	Mr. Meaty		8 episodes
2006	The Nine	Monica Turner	1 episode
2011	King	Prosecutor	1 episode
2011	Against the Wall	Nell Cortez	1 episode
2013	Degrassi: The Next Generation	Madame Cliquet	5 episodes
2014	Fargo	Helena Milos	1 episode
2015	Suits	Judge Hernandez	1 episode
2017	19-2	Detective Lapointe	3 episodes
2018	Schitt's Creek	Charlene	1 episode
2019	Wayne	Graciella	1 episode
2019	Workin' Moms	Hannah Sittart	2 episodes
2019	Cardinal	Dr. Jones	1 episode
2021	The Good Doctor	Dr. Karla Saravia	2 episodes
2021	Murder on Maple Drive	Harmony	TV movie
2021	Chapelwaite	Ann Morgan	8 episodes
2021–2023	Moonshine	Jill Leblanc	16 episodes
2023	Titans	Helena	1 episode
2023	Superman and Lois	Older Chemo Patient	3 episodes
