= The Last Hit Man =

- DVD Cover
- Directed by: Christopher Warre Smets
- Written by: Christopher Warre Smets
- Produced by: Erin Berry
- Starring: Joe Mantegna
- Cinematography: Joe Turner
- Edited by: James P. Villeneuve
- Distributed by: High Filers
- Release date: 2008
- Running time: 90 minutes
- Country: Canada
- Language: English
- Budget: $350,000 (estimated)

The Last Hit Man is a 2008 direct-to-video crime thriller film directed by Christopher Warre Smets. It tells the story of an aging contract killer who finds himself in crisis between his daughter and his job after an assignment gone awry.

The film won the award for Best Feature Film at the 2008 Canadian Film Festival.

== Synopsis ==
After he botches a hit, an aging hitman (Joe Mantegna) discovers that he's dying and decides to hide the truth from his daughter, who's also his business partner and getaway driver. When a younger hit man is sent to clean up the mess, he ends up impacting their lives in more ways than initially intended.

== Cast ==
- Joe Mantegna as Harry Tremayne - Father/Hitman
- Elizabeth Whitmere as Racquel Tremayne/Getaway Driver
- Romano Orzari as Billy Rosco/Hitman
- Michael Majeski as Todd/Boyfriend
- William Colgate as Fred Armitage/Harry's boss
- Shawn Lawrence as Fuller/Top boss
- Victoria Snow as Dr. Marion Mornamore
- Maya Ritter as Young Racquel
- Jonnie Chase as Strode/Hired Billy
- Sean Orr as Nicholston/Harry's missed hit

== Trivia ==
- Phil Elverum of The Microphones and Mount Eerie recorded an "[i]mprovised pump organ and electric guitar" soundtrack for this movie in late 2005.
- The film was dedicated in memory of Patricia Ragozzino (1948 - 2006).
