= Naomi McCormack =

Canadian film director, producer, screenwriter, theatre director and arts administrator

Naomi McCormack is a Canadian film director, producer, screenwriter, theatre director and arts administrator. She is most noted for her 1996 film The Hangman's Bride, which won the Genie Award for Best Live Action Short Drama at the 18th Genie Awards.

The twin sister of writer and legal educator Judith McCormack, she also directed a short film adaptation of her sister's short story "Plural" in 2011. She has also taught film studies at the University of Pennsylvania and Humber College, directed the documentary films Amazing Grace: Trapeze and Transcendence (1999) and Out of the Question: Women, Media and the Art of Inquiry (2009), and was credited as a producer on Dominique Cardona and Laurie Colbert's 2018 film Catch and Release.
