= John A.: Birth of a Country =

2011 television film directed by Jerry Ciccoritti

- Genre: Drama
- Based on: John A.: The Man Who Made Us by Richard Gwyn
- Written by: Bruce M. Smith
- Directed by: Jerry Ciccoritti
- Starring: Shawn Doyle; Peter Outerbridge; David La Haye; Patrick McKenna
- Composer: Steve London
- Country of origin: Canada
- Original language: English

Production
- Executive producers: Michael Levine; Michael Prupas
- Producer: Bernard Zukerman
- Cinematography: Michael Storey
- Editor: George Roulston
- Running time: 91 minutes
- Production companies: Canadian Broadcasting Corporation; Indian Grove Productions

Original release
- Network: CBC Television
- Release: September 19, 2011

John A.: Birth of a Country is a Canadian historical drama television film directed by Jerry Ciccoritti and written by Bruce M. Smith. It was produced by Indian Grove Productions in association with the Canadian Broadcasting Corporation, and aired on CBC Television on September 19, 2011.

Dramatizing the events that led up to Canadian Confederation in 1867, it is based on Richard Gwyn's 2008 non-fiction book John A.: The Man Who Made Us. It stars Shawn Doyle as Sir John A. Macdonald, alongside Peter Outerbridge, David La Haye, Aidan Devine, Michelle Nolden, Peter MacNeill, Cedric Smith, Rob Stewart, Ted Atherton, and Patrick McKenna.

The film won two Canadian Screen Award acting categories at the 1st Canadian Screen Awards, for Lead Actor in Television Film or Miniseries (Doyle) and Supporting Actor in a Drama Program or Series (Outerbridge). It also won the top direction (Jerry Ciccoritti) and writing (Bruce M. Smith) awards.

== Cast ==
- Shawn Doyle as John A. Macdonald
- Peter Outerbridge as George Brown
- David La Haye as George-Étienne Cartier
- Aidan Devine as John Sandfield Macdonald
- Jean-Michel Le Gal as Antoine-Aimé Dorion
- Michelle Nolden as Anne Nelson Brown
- Peter MacNeill as Allan MacNab
- Cedric Smith as Edmund Head
- Rob Stewart as William McDougall
- Ted Atherton as Charles Monck
- Patrick McKenna as Alexander Galt

== Reception ==
=== Accolades ===
Award	Date of ceremony	Category	Recipient	Result
Canadian Screen Awards	March 3, 2013	Lead Actor, Television Film or Miniseries	Shawn Doyle	Won
Canadian Screen Awards	March 3, 2013	Supporting Actor, Drama Program or Series	Peter Outerbridge	Won
Canadian Screen Awards	March 3, 2013	Directing, Dramatic Program or Miniseries	Jerry Ciccoritti	Won
Canadian Screen Awards	March 3, 2013	Writing, Dramatic Program or Miniseries	Bruce A. Smith	Won
