= Jelena Adzic =

Canadian on-air personality

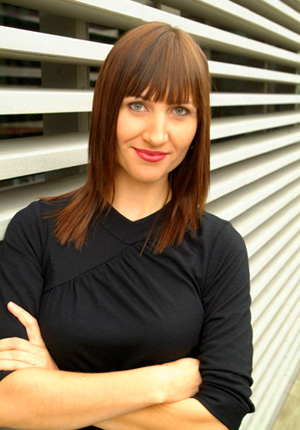
- Born: Belgrade, Socialist Republic of Serbia, SFR Yugoslavia (today Serbia)
- Occupation: Journalist
- Website: http://www.jelenaadzic.com/

Jelena Adzic (Serbian: Јелена Аџић, Jelena Adžić) is a Serbian-born Canadian radio and television journalist, currently the national arts and entertainment journalist for CBC News Network in Toronto.

== Career ==
Adzic began working at the CBC in 2002, where she has since become the national face of entertainment news. She hosts the television program "CBC News: The Scene" and also covers live events such as the Toronto International Film Festival. She has interviewed household names such as Desmond Tutu, Deepak Chopra and Susan Sarandon. She also does radio, including reporting and guest hosting for CBC programs such as "Here and Now (Toronto)" and "Q (radio show)". Adzic's approach to interviewing is friendly and informal, even when meeting A-listers such as Margaret Atwood. Her conversational style has resulted from wanting to treat her guests as equals. According to Adzic, "...the only area for me to break through that is to not be so reserved and guarded and not have this deference."

Earlier in her career, Adzic hosted the show 360° Vision at Vision TV and worked as a reporter at TechTV. Adzic has also produced programs for TVOntario, as well as the CTV Television Network, where she worked on "Suite & Simple", a travel series broadcast on the American channel Fine Living Network.

Adzic has spoken out about the harassment female journalists experience when out in the field and how they are also expected to smile more than their male counterparts.

== Background ==
Born in Belgrade, Serbia, Adzic immigrated to Canada when she was a child. She has a bachelor's degree in political science and business administration from Wilfrid Laurier University and studied documentary film production at Humber College. After finishing university, Adzic worked on a newspaper in Korea and did film production in Finland before returning to Canada. She is married with two children and paints in her spare time.
