= Jean Corolère =

Jean Corolère (c. 1730 – after 1752) was a resident of New France, who held the position of the colony's chief executioner in the early 1750s.

Born near Quimper, France, Corolère is believed to have come to New France as a military recruit. By 1750 he was a military drummer in the grenadier and gunner company. On January 26, 1751, he was involved in a duel against a man named Coffre; however, as duelling was illegal in New France, Corolère was arrested and sentenced to death. Coffre could not be arrested or tried, as he fled to parts unknown as soon as he learned that he was at risk of arrest.

In New France in that era, a man who had been sentenced to death could have his life spared if he agreed to accept the job of executioner; a female prisoner, meanwhile, could have her life spared if the executioner agreed to marry her. While in prison, Corolère's cell was next to that of Françoise Laurent, a young servant who had been sentenced to death for stealing clothes from her employers, and the two appear to have developed a relationship inside the prison walls; on August 17, 1751, Corolère petitioned to accept the job of executioner, saving his own life, and the following day, he petitioned to marry Laurent, saving hers.

He appears to have held the job of executioner for approximately a year, and there are no known historical records of his or Laurent's whereabouts after April 1752.

The story of Corolère and Laurent has been explored in several contemporary works, including Margaret Atwood's poem "Marrying the Hangman", Naomi McCormack's short historical drama film The Hangman's Bride, and Kate Cayley's theatrical play The Hanging of Françoise Laurent and novel The Hangman in the Mirror. Nearly all such works explore the story from Laurent's perspective rather than Corolère's, often positing that Laurent was in fact the one who convinced Corolère to accept the job and marry her, although none of the original historical records establish whether Corolère or Laurent was the real architect of the decision.
