= FAQMP =

Canadian political interview series

#FAQMP
- Genre: interview
- Presented by: Karyn Pugliese, Kevin O'Keefe
- Country of origin: Canada
- Original language: English

Production
- Production company: Stornoway Communications

Original release
- Network: ichannel
- Release: 2011

#FAQMP is a Canadian political interview series, which aired on ichannel and as a web series. Based around the principle of engaging viewers in the political process through social media, each episode of the program entered the production phase by soliciting participation in an online vote to determine which of three Canadian Members of Parliament would be interviewed that week by host Karyn Pugliese. Once the guest was selected, viewers were also invited to submit questions for Pugliese to ask.

MPs who were interviewed on the show included Dean Del Mastro, Justin Trudeau, Jason Kenney, Kyle Seeback, Parm Gill, Ted Hsu, Kevin Lamoureux, Devinder Shory, Bruce Stanton, Patrick Brown, Jim Karygiannis, and Claude Gravelle.

The series garnered a nomination for Best Cross-Platform Project, Non-Fiction at the 1st Canadian Screen Awards.
