= Gloria Montero =

Writer and documentary filmmaker

Gloria Montero (born 1933) is a writer and documentary filmmaker. She co-directed with David Fulton the documentaries "Years of Struggle" (1975), "The Horsemen" (1977), "The Cry of the Gull" (1977), and "Crisis in the Rain" (1981).

Montero was born to Spanish immigrants in Australia. She lived in Toronto from 1955 to 1978. As of 1973, Montero was the Executive-secretary of the Canadian Committee for a Democratic Spain, and as of 1975, its President. The organization opposed fascism in the country.

Her book The Immigrants (1977) included pieces of interviews with over 400 people, talking about their experiences. The same year, she hosted a series for CBC Radio called The Music of Spain. A second series, spanning 13 weeks, aired in 1980.

Montero and David Fulton moved from Canada in 1978. As of 1980, they were known to have been living in the old quarter of Barcelona, Spain with their teenaged son, Miguel. Her daughter, actress Allegra Fulton, stayed in Canada. She would later star in her mother's one-woman show Frida K., about Frida Kahlo at the 1994 Fringe of Toronto Festival. The production was The Globe and Mail critic's second favourite production that year.

In 1980, she released the book We Stood Together, a history of Canadian trade unions. She was working on a book about Canadians in the Spanish Civil War.

The Archives of Ontario has preserved four of her documentary films in its holdings as the Gloria Montero and David Fulton fonds (F 4368, 1975-1984).

As of 1980, she was known to be friends of pianist Jordi Sabates and Tete Montoliu.
