= Jeff Toyne =

- Born: Jeffrey William Toyne; January 7, 1975 (age 51); Sault Ste. Marie, Ontario, Canada
- Genre: Film scores
- Occupation: Film composer
- Website: jefftoyne.com

Jeffrey William Toyne (born January 7, 1975) is an Emmy-winning Canadian film composer. He won the Primetime Emmy Award for Outstanding Original Main Title Theme Music for his work on the Apple TV series Palm Royale.

== Early life ==
Born in Sault Ste. Marie, Ontario, Canada, Toyne earned a bachelor's degree in music composition from the University of Western Ontario. He pursued graduate studies in composition at the University of British Columbia, graduating with a master's degree in 1999. Immediately thereafter, he was selected to hold one of the composer-participant positions at the Henry Mancini Institute in Los Angeles.

Toyne then enrolled in the Scoring for Motion Pictures and Television post-graduate program at the University of Southern California in August 2000. Following his graduation from the program in May 2001, he began working with film composer Edward Shearmur in Los Angeles.

== Career ==
Toyne began working in film music around the turn of the 2000s, after completing graduate studies in composition. His early career combined composing with orchestration, a field in which he became a frequent contributor to major studio productions. Over the next two decades, he orchestrated music for more than 100 films, including District 9, Guillermo del Toro's Pinocchio, and The Super Mario Bros. Movie.

During the 2000s, Toyne composed for independent films, television movies, short films, and television series. His early feature scores included Maxwell's Demon and Shadow in the Trees, while his television work included the A&E reality series The Two Coreys. His work as an orchestrator included the 2009 science-fiction film District 9, whose soundtrack credits list Toyne and Aiko Fukushima as orchestrators for composer Clinton Shorter.

Toyne gained wider recognition as a composer in the early 2010s. He scored Abe Sylvia's feature-film directorial debut Dirty Girl, distributed by The Weinstein Company, beginning a long-running collaboration between Toyne and Sylvia that later included the television series Filthy Rich and Palm Royale. In 2011, Toyne composed the score for the Lifetime television film Magic Beyond Words: The J.K. Rowling Story. His work received a Canadian Screen Award nomination for Best Original Music Score for a Program.

From 2013 to 2017, Toyne composed the music for the crime drama Rogue, ultimately scoring 50 episodes of the series. His work on the episode "Mea Culpa" received a Leo Award nomination in 2016, and he won the Leo Award for Best Musical Score in a Dramatic Series the following year for the episode "Maria, Full of Grace." During the same period, his film scores included Life on the Line, How to Plan an Orgy in a Small Town, and 9/11.

In 2017, Toyne composed the score for Hit the Road (TV series), starring Jason Alexander, writing music for all ten episodes of its single season. He later reunited with Sylvia for the Fox series Filthy Rich in 2020, composing the music for its ten-episode run. Toyne has also worked outside film and television scoring as an arranger, including providing string and brass arrangements for Fall Out Boy's 2023 album So Much (for) Stardust through his collaboration with Patrick Stump.

Toyne's most prominent television work came with the Apple TV streaming series, Palm Royale, created by Sylvia and set in Palm Beach society in 1969. Toyne developed a period-influenced score drawing on orchestral music, Latin styles, big-band jazz, and the work of mid-20th-century film composers such as Henry Mancini and Bernard Herrmann. Much of the first season's score was performed live, using a 19-piece big band and a 50-piece orchestra.

For its first season, Toyne received two Primetime Emmy Award nominations in 2024, for Outstanding Music Composition for a Series and Outstanding Original Main Title Theme Music. He won the latter category at the 76th Primetime Creative Arts Emmy Awards. The score subsequently received additional honours from the Society of Composers & Lyricists, the Canadian Screen Music Awards, the Music+Sound Awards, and the ASCAP Composers' Choice Awards.

Returning as the composer for the second season, in 2026 Toyne received another Emmy nomination for Outstanding Music Composition for a Series for the episode "Maxine Drinks Martinis Now", bringing his career total to three Primetime Emmy nominations and one win as of 2026.

== Filmography ==
=== Films ===
- Whisper Breach (2025)
- The Surrogate Scandal (2023)
- The Believer (2021)
- Butter (2020)
- The Conjuring: The Devil Made Me Do It (2021) writer "Rachel Sees a Ghost"
- Daughter of the Wolf (2019)
- Thom Pain (2017)
- 9/11 (2017)
- Hot Bot (2016)
- Life on the Line (2015)
- How to Plan an Orgy in a Small Town (2015)
- A Year and Change (2015)
- Damaged (2014)
- The Privileged (2013)
- I Give it a Year (2013) music arranger
- Abel's Field (2012)
- Mirror Mirror (2012) music arranger
- Murder on the 13th Floor (2012)
- Johnny English Reborn (2011) music arranger
- Blooded (2011) co-composed with Ilan Eshkeri
- Dirty Girl (2010)
- Ten Years Later (2009)
- White Light (2008) additional music
- Box Elder (2008)
- Within (2007)
- The New Twenty (2007)
- Shadow in the Trees (2007)
- I.R.A. : King of Nothing (2006) additional music
- The Third Eye (2006)
- Beyond Honor (2004) additional music
- El Padrino (2004) additional music
- Midnight is Coming (2002)
- Maxwell's Demon (1998)

=== Television ===
- Palm Royale (series) (2024-2026)
- Filthy Rich (series) (2020)
- Christmas on the Vine (MOW) (2020)
- A Very Vintage Christmas (MOW) (2019)
- Deadly Hollywood Obsession (MOW) (2019)
- Christmas Camp (MOW) (2018)
- Hit the Road (series) (2017)
- Vanity Fair (series) (2017) music arranger
- The Volunteers (series) (2017)
- The Landlord (MOW) (2017)
- Christmas Cottage (MOW) (2017)
- Christmas Homecoming (MOW) (2017)
- The Dangers of Online Dating (series) (2017)
- Rogue (series) (2013–17)
- Chris & Jack (series) (2016)
- Young & Reckless (series) (2016)
- You Me Her (series) (2016)
- Christmas List (MOW) (2016)
- Unleashing Mr. Darcy (MOW) (2016)
- Love on the Sidelines (MOW) (2016)
- Mighty MIghty Monsters: Pranks for the Memories (Teletoon 2015)
- The Christmas Shepherd (MOW) (2014)
- Along Came a Nanny (MOW) (2014)
- Run for Your LIfe (MOW) (2014)
- The Memory Book (MOW) (2014)
- Presumed Dead in Paradise (MOW) (2014)
- Hunt for the Labyrinth Killer (MOW) (2013)
- Twist of Faith (MOW) (2013)
- The Real St. Nick (MOW) (2012)
- Holiday Spin (MOW) (2012)
- The Devil You Know (series) (2010-2012)
- Magic Beyond Words: The JK Rowling Story (MOW) (2011)
- Who Is Clark Rockefeller? (MOW) (2010)
- Taken in Broad Daylight (MOW) (2009)
- Make or Break TV (series) (2008)
- The Egg Factory (MOW) (2008) additional music
- Dorm Life (web series) (2008)
- The Two Coreys (series) (2007)
- Parking Lot Guy (pilot) (2007)
- Second Sight (MOW) (2007) additional music
- The Perfect Suspect (MOW) (2006) additional music
- The First Emperor (special) (2006) additional music
- Ultimate Fighter (series) (2005) additional music
- American Casino (series) (2004–05) additional music
- The Daily Blade (pilot) (2000)

=== Video Games ===
- MLB Front Office Manager (2009)

=== Theatre ===
- Copenhagen (Vancouver Playhouse 2005)
- Below the Belt (Gardner Stages 2004)
- Edge of Allegiance 3 (MET Theatre 2004)

== Discography ==
Year	Artist	Album	Contribution
2023	Fall Out Boy	So Much (for) Stardust	String and Brass Arrangements
2018	Fall Out Boy	Lake Effect Kid	String and Brass Arrangements
2004	Universal Hall Pass	Mercury	String Arrangements
