= Judith McCormack =

Canadian author of literary fiction

Judith McCormack is a Canadian author of literary fiction.

== Biography ==
McCormack's first short story was nominated for the Journey Prize, and her next three were selected for the Coming Attractions Anthology. Her collection of stories, The Rule of Last Clear Chance, was shortlisted for the Commonwealth Writers Prize and the Rogers Writers' Trust Fiction Prize, and was named one of the best books of the year by The Globe and Mail. Her work has been published in the Harvard Review, Descant and The Fiddlehead, and one of her stories has been turned into a short film by her twin sister Naomi McCormack, an award-winning filmmaker. One of her short stories in the Harvard Review was recorded as a spoken word version by The Drum, and was anthologized in Best Canadian Short Stories 2014. Backspring, her first novel, was shortlisted for the 2016 Amazon.ca First Novel Award. Her most recent book, The Singing Forest, was named one of the ten best historical novels of 2021 by the New York Times.

McCormack had a previous career as a lawyer, in which she held the positions of Chair of the Ontario Labour Relations Board, Executive Director of Downtown Legal Services, Assistant Dean and adjunct professor of the University of Toronto Faculty of Law, among others. As a result of her work in this field, she was awarded the Law Society Medal for outstanding service in accordance with the highest ideals of the profession and The Guthrie Award for outstanding contributions to access to justice.

== Awards ==
- Law Society Medal
- The Guthrie Award
