= 360° Vision =

Television Series

360° Vision is a Canadian television newsmagazine series, which aired on VisionTV from 2003 to 2007. The program aired news and documentary reports on matters relating to the role of spirituality, religion and faith in news and current events.

The show covered both the positive and negative aspects of religion, including features on human rights and social justice, and reports critical of unethical practices in churches or church-affiliated charities and sexual abuse in church organizations. Upon the death of Pope John Paul II in 2005, the show aired a special episode which paired a documentary feature on his legacy with interfaith panel discussions about both the positive and negative aspects of his impact on world affairs. Its final episode, which aired on May 30, 2007, profiled a woman fighting to overturn the Roman Catholic Church's ban on the ordination of women as priests.

The program was hosted in its first season by Jelena Adzic, and in the second season by Noelle Richardson. Episodes often included commentaries by religious affairs journalist Marianne Meed Ward. In later seasons the show had no full-time host, but instead individual episodes were hosted by a team of journalists including Karyn Pugliese and Sadia Zaman.

The series was a nominee for Best News and Information Series at the 2006 Gemini Awards.
