= Catch and Release (2018 film) =

- Film poster
- Directed by: Dominique Cardona; Laurie Colbert
- Written by: Dominique Cardona; Laurie Colbert
- Based on: Keely and Du by Jane Martin
- Produced by: Laurie Colbert; Naomi McCormack; Paul Lee; Jennifer Mesich; Rechna Varma
- Starring: Laurence Leboeuf; Nancy Palk; Aidan Devine
- Cinematography: James Klopko
- Edited by: Gino Zolezzi
- Music by: David Baron
- Production companies: Dykon Films; Green Hummingbird Entertainment; White Eagle Entertainment
- Distributed by: Game Theory Films
- Release date: September 21, 2018 (Cinéfest)
- Running time: 80 minutes
- Country: Canada
- Language: English

Catch and Release is a Canadian drama film, directed by Dominique Cardona and Laurie Colbert and released in 2018. An adaptation of Jane Martin's theatrical play Keely and Du, the film stars Laurence Leboeuf as Keely, a woman who got pregnant from being raped by her ex-husband, but has been kidnapped by an extremist anti-abortion group and is being detained at a remote wilderness cabin in Northern Ontario to prevent her from aborting the pregnancy.

The cast also includes Nancy Palk as Du, the guard watching Keely to prevent her from escaping, and Aidan Devine as Du's colleague Robert, as well as Peter Mooney and Michael James Regan in supporting roles.

The film had its theatrical premiere at the Cinéfest Sudbury International Film Festival in September 2018 as Keely and Du, and was subsequently screened at other film festivals under the Catch and Release title. In an interview with the Toronto-based Muff film blog, Cardona and Colbert clarified their reasons for retitling the film, noting that the original title did not necessarily resonate with audiences as the play is not as well-remembered in the 2010s as it was in its prime, and instead they opted to play on the film's use of catch and release fishing as a metaphor. It was released to video-on-demand platforms in 2020 as Catch and Release.

== Critical response ==
Chris Knight of the National Post rated the film 2.5 stars out of 5, writing that "The resulting product is serious, well shot and thoughtful to a point, but it cries out for more shaded characters and motivations. As it stands, it won't change the minds of any abortion foes, who won't recognize themselves in the overtly villainous kidnappers. Like the fishing practice, Catch and Release lets viewers go on their way untroubled and unchanged." He also criticized the title change, asserting that the original Keely and Du was a better title as it affirmed the connection to the original source material, while the new title left the possibility of viewers getting it confused with the very different Catch and Release from 2006.

For In the Seats, Thomas Wishloff also rated the film 2.5 stars, concluding that "it’s impossible to shake the feeling that no matter how well-crafted some the ambient surroundings are, they’re trapped inside a film far less interesting than it could be. This isn’t a great exploration of religious fundamentalism, nor is it even a great play at the need for women to stand together. It’s actually a horror film, and one that needs a stronger sense of catharsis."

Alisha Mughal of Exclaim! reviewed the film more favourably, rating it 7 out of 10 and writing that "Catch and Release's broad strokes would certainly have been provocative and effective when Keely and Du first came out in 1993. Today, in 2020, it still offers a powerful message, because the movie's directors are right: we still haven't come far enough in transforming attitudes towards abortions. We need to continue the dialogue."
