= Todd Lamirande =

Canadian journalist

Todd Lamirande is a Canadian video journalist. He is a member of the Métis Nation, and was formerly a co-host of APTN National News, aired by the Aboriginal Peoples Television Network (APTN) and a host and co-producer of APTN Investigates.

== Career ==
He currently hosts APTN: Nation to Nation, a half hour show focused on the politics of how Metis, Inuit and First Nations are rebuilding their relationship with Canada. Lamirande first joined APTN in July 2000, working as a video journalist in APTN's Vancouver Bureau for four years before transferring to the Winnipeg Bureau and assuming the position of co-host.

== 2001 seizure of video equipment ==
Lamirande became mired in a controversy on June 24, 2001, when the Royal Canadian Mounted Police (RCMP) seized his vehicle and videotapes containing footage of members of the Native Youth Movement as they protested the development of Sun Peaks Resort, a ski resort in Sun Peaks, British Columbia, 55 kilometers northeast of Kamloops. Lamirande had videotaped part of the confrontation, which later turned violent as protestors clashed with supporters of the project.

The actions of the RCMP outraged the Canadian Journalists for Free Expression (CJFE). CJFE Executive Director, Sharmini Peries, called the incident "an affront" to the integrity of journalists' materials, adding:

'Todd Lamirande, simply by doing his job - by exercising his right to free expression - is being sought for the product of his work,' Peries said. 'More troubling, because his footage may be used in future criminal proceedings, both he and the network for which he works run the risk of being perceived as adjuncts of the state, which they are definitely not.'

Lamirande commented that he felt racism was at play in the incident, noting that he doubted that the RCMP would have tried to seize the videotapes if he worked for the Canadian Broadcasting Corporation (CBC) or CTV Television Network.

APTN sought a court injunction to prevent the RCMP from using the videotapes as evidence.
