= CBC News: The Scene =

- Starring: Jelena Adzic
- Country of origin: Canada
- Original language: English
- No. of seasons: 3

Original release
- Network: CBC Television
- Release: November 2005 – present

CBC News: The Scene is a Canadian entertainment news program on CBC Television and CBC Newsworld. It airs a two-minute weekday wrap on CBC News Network and local CBC newscasts, with a half-hour Weekend Scene edition airs on Fridays, Saturdays and Sundays on CBC News Network.

The show is hosted by journalist Jelena Adzic.

== Other regular cast ==
- Sandra Abma, national arts reporter
- Mio Adilman, online commentator
- Laura Thompson, music reviewer
