= Choke. =

2004 Canadian film

choke.
- Directed by: David Hyde
- Written by: Sean Reycraft
- Produced by: Tyler Levine; Hartley Gorenstein; Carolyn Newman
- Starring: Lindy Booth; Marcello Cabezas; Allegra Fulton
- Cinematography: Raymond Dumas
- Edited by: David Hyde
- Music by: David Sorbara
- Production company: Radke Films
- Release date: 2004 (Palm Springs)
- Running time: 12 minutes
- Country: Canada
- Language: English

choke. is a Canadian short drama film, directed by David Hyde and released in 2004.

Described by producer Tyler Levine as "a story about three failures, smart enough to know what they want to do with their lives, but not talented enough to actually do it", the film stars Lindy Booth as Andrea, a figure skater who chokes in competition whenever her medical school dropout boyfriend Paul (Marcello Cabezas) is in the audience; one day she catches Paul in a romantic embrace with Ms. Morgan (Allegra Fulton), following which she kills Paul and gets away with murder.

The film premiered at the 2004 Palm Springs International Festival of Short Films, and had its Canadian premiere at the 2004 Toronto International Film Festival.

The film was a Genie Award nominee for Best Live Action Short Drama at the 25th Genie Awards in 2005.
