= APTN National News =

Canadian national news program

APTN National News is a Canadian television national news program broadcast by the Aboriginal Peoples Television Network (APTN) from Winnipeg, Manitoba, Canada.

The program produces a single half hour of news each day, broadcasts at 6 and 11:30 p.m. Eastern Time nightly, as well as various specialty programs including Investigates on Mondays and Fridays, Laughing Drum, a half hour talk show where comedians review the headlines of the week, Face-to-Face, a long form interview show, InFocus an hour long live interactive talk show, and Nation to Nation, a show examining the political relationship between First Peoples and Canada. Each day there are also short headline news updates on the hour during the afternoon.

The daily newscast's current presenters are Dennis Ward and Melissa Ridgen. Ridgen also hosts InFocus and Ward also hosts Face-to-Face. Todd Lamirande hosts Nation to Nation. Investigates has no single overall host, but has reports filed by all members of APTN's news team.

In 2019, the news division also launched Nouvelles Nationales d’APTN, a weekly French language news program presented by Sophie Claude Miller.

In addition to its main newsroom in Winnipeg, APTN National News has news bureaus in Halifax, Montreal, Ottawa, Toronto, Thunder Bay, Saskatoon, Edmonton, Calgary, Vancouver, Iqaluit, Yellowknife and Whitehorse.

News and current affairs staff at APTN applied for and received union certification with the Canadian Media Guild from the Canadian Labour Board in 2002. Unionized staff reached its first collective agreement with APTN management in April 2003.

On June 8, 2012, the award-winning journalist Karyn Pugliese was appointed as the director of news and current affairs for APTN. Pugliese previously worked as the Ottawa correspondent for APTN National News from 2000 to 2006.

== History ==
APTN National News started on a daily basis on October 28, 2002, and was hosted by Nola Wuttunee until 2006. Before the daily launch of APTN National News, the newscast on APTN was called In-Vision News and was hosted by Carol Morin (2000-2001). In-Vision News began on April 16, 2000. Other previous hosts of APTN National News include Donna Smith (2006-2008), Holly Bernier (2008-2009), Todd Lamirande (2008-2010), Patrice Mousseau (2009-2010) and Dana Foster (2011).

APTN National News Contact was hosted by Rick Harp from 2000 to 2005, Madeleine Allakariallak from 2005 to 2007 and Cheryl McKenzie from 2007 to 2009.

Previous news directors have included Dan David (1999-2001), Jim Compton (2001-2002), Rita Deverell (2002-2005) and Vera Houle (2005-2011) Karyn Pugliese (2012-2019).

In 2026, for the first time in its history, APTN National News won the Canadian Screen Award for Best National Newscast at the 14th Canadian Screen Awards.
