= Rob Bowman (music writer) =

Canadian ethnomusicologist and writer (born 1956)

- Born: 1956 (age 69–70) Toronto, Canada
- Occupation: Ethnomusicologist, writer
- Education: HBA York (1978), MFA York (1982), PhD Memphis (1993)
- Subject: Music
- Notable awards: Grammy Award for Best Album Notes; 1996 The Complete Stax/Volt Soul Singles, Vol. 3: 1972–1975

Rob Bowman (born 21 June 1956) is a Canadian Grammy Award-winning professor of ethnomusicology and a music writer.

Formerly the director of York University's Graduate Program in Ethnomusicology and Musicology in Toronto, Canada, he has written many liner notes, studies and books on popular music. He has been nominated six times for Grammy Awards.

== Early life and education ==
Bowman was born and grew up in Toronto. He earned an Honours B.A. degree in musicology in 1978 at York University, and in 1982 completed an M.F.A. in ethnomusicology, also at York. In 1983, he began his PhD studies at the University of Memphis, completing these in 1993.

== Career ==
Bowman began writing for a music magazine in Toronto in 1971 at the age of 15.

In 1979 Bowman began teaching part-time at York University in Toronto, where he introduced the study of popular music. He also taught part-time at Brock University and George Brown College, beginning in 1987. In 1993 he became an assistant professor at York University; three-year later he served as an adjunct professor. By 1998 he was director of York's graduate music program.

Bowman studied the history of the Stax Records label and its artists; he created liner notes for boxed sets of The Complete Stax/Volt Soul Singles. In 2003 he wrote a book, Soulsville, U.S.A. – The Story of Stax Records, about the history of the Memphis-based record label. This book earned the ASCAP-Deems Taylor Award and the ARSC Award for excellence in music research.

Bowman won the 1996 Best Album Notes Grammy for his 47,000-word monograph accompanying the 10-CD boxed set of The Complete Stax/Volt Soul Singles, Vol. 3: 1972–1975. His fifth Grammy nomination came in 2002 for Best Album Notes for the 4-CD box set The Stax Story, which he also co-produced.

In the 2000s and 2010s, Bowman created the programs for each year's Rock‘N’ Roll Hall of Fame induction ceremony, after interviewing the inductees.

Bowman was again nominated for a Grammy award for his profile of the 1960s transgender R&B and soul singer Jackie Shane, which was included with the double album Any Other Way, a collection of her lesser-known recordings, which was nominated for a Grammy Award for Best Historical Album in 2019. He also co-produced the album.

== Film ==
Bowman was one of many musical figures to appear in the 2005 Canadian country music mockumentary The Life and Hard Times of Guy Terrifico and in the 2010 documentary on singer-songwriter Ron Sexsmith, Love Shines. He also appeared in the 2017 CBC documentary film Dreaming of a Jewish Christmas.

He is a co-executive producer for the HBO documentary mini-series, STAX: Soulsville U.S.A., which aired in May, 2024.

== Publications ==
=== Books ===
- Soulsville, U.S.A. – The Story of Stax Records, Music Sales Group, 2006, ISBN 978-0825672842
- The Flyer Vault – 150 Years of Toronto Concert History, Dundurn Press, 2019, ISBN 9781459745421
- The Last Soul Company: The Malaco Records Story. Malaco Press, 2020, ISBN 9780578233345

=== Liner notes ===
- The Complete Stax / Volt Soul Singles, Vol. 3: 1972–1975 : Various Artists : Concord Music Group, 2011
- Any Other Way, Jackie Shane, 2017.
- The Rolling Stones: Their Satanic Majesties Request (50th Anniversary) , Rolling Stones, 2017.
