= Life on the Line (film) =

- Promotional poster
- Directed by: David Hackl
- Written by: Primo Brown; Marvin Peart; Peter I. Horton
- Story by: Chad Dubea; Primo Brown; Marvin Peart
- Produced by: Marvin Peart; Phillip Glasser
- Starring: John Travolta; Kate Bosworth; Devon Sawa; Julie Benz; Gil Bellows; Ryan Robbins; Sharon Stone
- Cinematography: Brian Pearson
- Edited by: Jamie Alain
- Music by: Jeff Toyne
- Production companies: Grindstone Entertainment Group; Elite Film Productions; Marro Films; Voltage Pictures
- Distributed by: Lionsgate Premiere
- Release dates: November 5, 2015 (Napa Valley Film Festival); November 18, 2016 (United States)
- Running time: 97 minutes
- Country: United States
- Language: English
- Budget: $12 million

Life on the Line is a 2015 American direct-to-video disaster thriller film directed by David Hackl and written by Primo Brown, Marvin Peart and Peter I. Horton, starring John Travolta, Kate Bosworth, Devon Sawa, Gil Bellows, Julie Benz, Ryan Robbins and Sharon Stone. The film was released on November 18, 2016, by Lionsgate Premiere. The story follows a crew of electrical linemen who, while maintaining the power grid of their Texas town, find themselves in a deadly storm and have to fight for their lives.

== Plot ==
A man named Duncan is interviewed for a documentary. He is asked what it is like to be a lineman.

Lineman Danny Ginner leaves his daughter Bailey to fix a downed power line with his brother Beau. The line is struck by lightning and Danny is rushed to the hospital. As Danny's wife Maggie drives to the hospital her car is struck by a truck, killing her. The next morning, Beau comforts Bailey, his niece.

Fifteen years later, Beau and Bailey are living together. She is a waitress at a diner and he is now head lineman. New neighbors Carline and Eugene move in; Eugene also works for the power company. Beau's workmates, including Pok' Chop, throw him a surprise birthday party.

Bailey's ex, Duncan, works for the same company and lives with his alcoholic mother. Duncan is trying to rekindle the relationship, to the dismay of another of Bailey's ex-boyfriends, Ron.

Eugene is suspicious of Carline due to her past infidelity. Ron tries to rekindle his relationship with Bailey but Carline helps her rebuff him. That night, Bailey sees Carline getting into a taxi while Eugene is at work.

Eugene finds numbers he does not recognize on Carline's phone. She claims they are Bailey's friends. Eugene tries to ask Bailey about them but is interrupted by Carline.

Carline notices that Bailey is pregnant. Bailey reveals that it is Duncan's baby.

Bailey and Duncan rekindle their relationship, to Beau's dismay, since he wants Bailey to go to college. Beau gets drunk in the bar and voices his opinion to Duncan until Pok' Chop intervenes.

A storm causes a power line to fall onto train tracks and derails a train. Beau's team are called out.

Eugene calls Carline to say he just wanted to hear her voice, then climbs an electrical tower and contemplates suicide. He decides against it and goes home.

As the storm worsens, Ron breaks into Carline's house and assaults her. Eugene arrives and brandishes a gun.

Bailey sees Eugene going into the house with a gun and goes to help. Eugene aims at Ron but is dazzled by Bailey's flashlight. Ron makes a grab for Eugene's gun but several shots ring out and he is killed. As Eugene and Carline reconcile they see that Bailey has been shot in the stomach. They rush her to the hospital. Pok' Chop sees her there and calls Beau.

The storm knocks out power to the city and the doctor cannot perform surgery. Pok' Chop calls Beau to say they need the power back on or Bailey will not survive. Beau relates this to Duncan.

At the central power hub Beau and Duncan see a fuse has popped. Beau climbs the tower to push down on the fuse with a hot stick but is not successful. Beau apologizes to Duncan for mistreating him, then jumps on to the fuse to force it to connect. Power is restored, but Beau is electrocuted. The doctor operates and saves Bailey's life.

In the interview, Duncan says Beau was the definition of a lineman and he hopes to be even half the lineman Beau was. He is called in on his radio for an approaching storm.

Two years later, Duncan, Bailey, their baby, and Pok' Chop are at a monument dedicated to all the local lineman that have lost their lives in the service. Danny and Beau's names are among them.

== Cast ==
- John Travolta as Beau Ginner
- Kate Bosworth as Bailey Ginner
- Devon Sawa as Duncan
- Gil Bellows as Pok' Chop
- Julie Benz as Carline
- Ryan Robbins as Eugene
- Ty Olsson as Danny Ginner
- Sharon Stone as Duncan's Mother
- Reese Alexander as Russell
- Emilie Ullerup as Becky
- Stuart Stone as Hunter
- Matt Bellefleur as Ron
- Lydia Styslinger as Elly
- Christian Michael Cooper as Dillon
- Sidney Grigg as Young Bailey Ginner
- Jim Shield as Norm
- Louis Ferreira as Mr. Fontaine
- Angelina Lyubomirova as Alicia
- Dean Wray as George
- Edwin Perez as Jorge
- Elan Ross Gibson as Cook
- Derek Hamilton as Raymond
- Toby Levins as Phil
- Milo Shandel as Travis
- Bo Steele as Bar Musician

== Release ==
The film premiered at the Napa Valley Film Festival on November 5, 2015. The film was released on November 18, 2016, by Lionsgate Premiere.

== Reception ==
On Rotten Tomatoes the film has an approval rating of 0% based on reviews from 15 critics.

Sheri Linden of The Hollywood Reporter wrote: "Life may be on the line, but it's in short supply on the screen."
