= 8th Fire =

Canadian television documentary series

8th Fire: Aboriginal Peoples, Canada & the Way Forward is a Canadian broadcast documentary series, which aired in 2012. Featuring television, radio and web broadcasting components, the series focused on the changing nature of Canada's relationship with its First Nations communities.

The television component aired as a four-part documentary hosted by Wab Kinew as part of CBC Television's Doc Zone, while radio programming devoted to First Nations themes aired on a variety of CBC Radio series and the web component included content from a variety of contributors, including news coverage by CBC News reporters and a series of short films by 20 First Nations, Inuit and Métis reporters and filmmakers. The soundtrack for the documentary series was composed by Cris Derksen.

The series was a shortlisted nominee for the Donald Brittain Award for Best Social/Political Documentary Program, and for Best Cross-Platform Project, Non-Fiction, at the 1st Canadian Screen Awards.

== Episode ==
8th Fire Episode 1 - Indigenous in the City

8th Fire Episode 2 - It's Time!

8th Fire Episode 3 - Whose Land is it Anyway?

8th Fire Episode 4 - At the Crossroads
