= Maya Ritter =

Canadian actress (born 1993)

- Occupation(s): Actress, talent agent
- Years active: 2006–present

Maya Ritter is a Canadian actress and talent agent.

== Career ==
Ritter played the lead role of Molly McIntire in the 2006 television movie Molly: An American Girl on the Home Front. She also starred in the film Finn's Girl as Zelly in 2007. That same year she acted in Holiday Switch as Eleanor. In 2008 she acted in The Last Hit Man as the Young Raquel. Her most recent role was in The Capture of the Green River Killer as Teen Angela.

== Filmography ==
=== Film ===
| Year | Title | Role | Notes |
|---|---|---|---|
| 2007 | Finn's Girl | Zelly | |
| 2008 | The Last Hit Man | Young Raquel | |
| 2012 | Margarita | Mali | |

=== Television ===
| Year | Title | Role | Notes |
|---|---|---|---|
| 2006 | Molly: An American Girl on the Home Front | Molly McIntire | Television film |
| 2007 | Holiday Switch | Eleanor | Television film |
| 2008 | The Capture of the Green River Killer | Angela Reichert | 2 episodes |
| 2012 | Rookie Blue | Amber Klein | Episode: "Coming Home" |
| 2015–2018 | Goldie & Bear | Ginger | 13 episodes |
