= Laurie Colbert =

Canadian film director and producer

Laurie Colbert is a Canadian film director, producer, and screenwriter. She works primarily but not exclusively in collaboration with Dominique Cardona. The duo are most noted for their 1999 short film Below the Belt, which was a Genie Award nominee for Best Live Action Short Drama at the 21st Genie Awards in 2000, and their feature film Margarita, which won the Audience Award for Best Feature Film at the Inside Out Film and Video Festival in 2012.

Their other films have included the documentary shorts Thank God I'm a Lesbian (1992) and My Feminism (1997), and the feature films Finn's Girl (2007) and Catch and Release (2018). Finn wrote Finn's Girl, but she and Cardona co-conceived the idea for the film.

Separately from Cardona, Colbert was an assistant director on Naomi McCormack's short film The Hangman's Bride.
