= Below the Belt (1999 film) =

- Directed by: Dominique Cardona; Laurie Colbert
- Written by: Dominique Cardona; Laurie Colbert
- Produced by: Kate Gillen
- Starring: Nathalie Toriel; Cara Pifko; Tanja Jacobs
- Cinematography: Derek Rogers
- Edited by: Paul Fox
- Release date: February 1999 (Berlin)
- Running time: 12 minutes
- Country: Canada
- Language: English

Below the Belt is a Canadian short drama film, directed by Dominique Cardona and Laurie Colbert and released in 1999. The film stars Nathalie Toriel and Cara Pifko as Oona and Jill, two young lesbian amateur boxers who fall in love, and then discover that one of their mothers (Tanja Jacobs) is also having an extramarital affair with another woman.

The film premiered in the Panorama program at the 1999 Berlin International Film Festival, as the opening film to Anne Wheeler's lesbian romantic comedy feature Better Than Chocolate. It was subsequently screened at the Inside Out Film and Video Festival in 1999, where it was co-winner of the Audience Award for Best Short Film, and at the 1999 Toronto International Film Festival.

The film was a Genie Award nominee for Best Live Action Short Drama at the 21st Genie Awards in 2000.
