= Zoink'd =

- Genre: Game Show
- Country of origin: Canada
- Original language: English
- No. of seasons: 2
- No. of episodes: 28

Production
- Running time: 22 minutes
- Production companies: Pivotal Media Inc.; Nelvana

Original release
- Network: YTV
- Release: March 15, 2012 – August 20, 2013

Zoink'd was a children's television game show that started on March 15, 2012, and ended on August 20, 2013, appearing on Canadian cable channel YTV. The show was produced by Pivotal Media in association with Nelvana, both based in Toronto. It was hosted by Adam Christie, the show spotlighted the "weird and wacky" talent of adults, who were then rated by a panel of judges, made up of four children. Broadcast on Saturday evenings, the show targeted an audience which includes children and families.

== Summary ==
This talent show had kids as the judges and adults as the entertainers, each performer had one minute to entertain them, if one gets bored in 20 seconds, (s)he would pull the lever, extracting confetti, if another is bored, (s)he would pull the lever to extract more confetti, or sometimes balls, if one or more are extremely bored, they would pull the lever to extract goo, and then they would be eliminated, the winner at the end wins the title of 'Zoink Master' and $1000.
