= Magic Beyond Words =

2011 television film directed by Paul A. Kaufman

- Also known as: Magic Beyond Words: The J.K. Rowling Story
- Genre: Biography
- Written by: Jeffrey Berman; Tony Caballero
- Directed by: Paul A. Kaufman
- Starring: Poppy Montgomery; Emily Holmes; Janet Kidder; Paul McGillion; Antonio Cupo; Andrew Kavadas
- Theme music composer: Jeff Toyne
- Country of origin: United States
- Original language: English

Production
- Cinematography: Mathias Herndl
- Editor: Lisa Binkley
- Running time: 90 minutes

Original release
- Network: Lifetime
- Release: July 18, 2011

Magic Beyond Words: The J.K. Rowling Story is a made-for-TV film starring actress Poppy Montgomery. It is based on the book J.K. Rowling A Biography, by Sean Smith, detailing the journey of struggling single mother J. K. Rowling, her bid to become a published author, and her rise to fame that followed the publication of Harry Potter and the Philosopher's Stone.

The film, shot in British Columbia, Canada, aired on Lifetime on July 18, 2011.

== Cast ==
- Poppy Montgomery as J. K. Rowling
- Emily Holmes as Diane Rowling
  - Sarah Desjardins as young Diane Rowling
- Janet Kidder as Anne Rowling
- Paul McGillion as Peter Rowling
- Antonio Cupo as Jorge Arantes
- Andrew Kavadas as John Nettleship

== Awards ==
At the Canadian Screen Awards 2013, the film won in the category for Best Dramatic Mini-Series or TV Film. Poppy Montgomery was also nominated in category for Lead actress in television film or miniseries, but lost to Emily Osment.
