= Joseph Ziegler (actor) =

Canadian actor and theatre director (1953–2025)

- Born: November 7, 1953; Minneapolis, Minnesota, U.S.
- Died: July 28, 2025 (aged 71)
- Occupations: Actor, theatre director
- Years active: 1979–2025
- Spouse: Nancy Palk
- Children: 3

Joseph Patrick Timothy Ziegler (November 7, 1953 – July 28, 2025) was a Canadian actor and theatre director, most noted as one of the founders of the Soulpepper theatre company.

== Early life and career ==
Born in Minneapolis, Minnesota, Ziegler studied theatre at the University of Minnesota before moving to Canada to continue his education at the National Theatre School of Canada. After graduating in 1979, he moved to Toronto, Ontario, where he had acting roles with various theatre companies, including Theatre Passe Muraille, Tarragon Theatre, the Shaw Festival, and the Stratford Festival, before becoming a member of the founding Soulpepper collective in 1998.

Over his career, he also had film and television roles, most notably as Dr. Jim Barker in Side Effects and Len Hubbard in Black Harbour.

He was a two-time Dora Mavor Moore Award winner for Best Leading Actor, General Theatre, in 2008 for The Time of Your Life, and in 2011 for Death of a Salesman. He was also a nominee in 2001 for The School for Wives, and in 2017 for The Last Wife. Ziegler was also nominated twice for Best Direction, General Theatre, in 2005 for Hamlet and in 2006 for Our Town.

== Personal life and death ==
He was married to actress Nancy Palk, alongside whom he acted in several productions, including Death of a Salesman, Long Day's Journey Into Night, and A Tender Thing, a play by Ben Power which reimagines William Shakespeare's Romeo and Juliet as an elderly couple confronting mortality. They had three sons: Tim, Charles, and Henry.

Ziegler died of complications from Alzheimer's disease on July 28, 2025, at the age of 71.
