= Finn's Girl =

- Directed by: Dominique Cardona; Laurie Colbert
- Written by: Laurie Colbert
- Produced by: Carolynne Bell; Dominique Cardona; Laurie Colbert
- Starring: Brooke Johnson; Maya Ritter; Yanna McIntosh; Richard Clarkin
- Cinematography: Patrick McGowan
- Edited by: Gino Zolezzi
- Music by: Tom Third
- Production company: Cardona-Colbert Productions
- Distributed by: Peccadillo Pictures
- Release date: June 4, 2007 (Newfest)
- Running time: 88 minutes
- Country: Canada
- Language: English

Finn's Girl is a 2007 Canadian drama film, directed by Dominique Cardona and Laurie Colbert. The film stars Brooke Johnson as Finn, a medical doctor mourning the recent death of her wife Nancy (Gail Maurice) while continuing to step-parent Nancy's rebellious daughter Zelly (Maya Ritter) and managing an abortion clinic which is being threatened by the increasingly violent protests of the anti-abortion movement.

The film also stars Richard Clarkin as Zelly's father Paul, and Yanna McIntosh and Gilles Lemaire as Diana and Xavier, the police officers helping Finn to protect the clinic.

The film was Cardona and Colbert's first narrative feature film, after making primarily documentaries and short films.

It premiered on June 4, 2007, at the New York Lesbian, Gay, Bisexual, & Transgender Film Festival. It was subsequently screened at Outfest, where it won an award for emerging cinema, and at the Montreal World Film Festival, where it was a nominee for the Golden Zenith Award for Best First Feature.

== Cast ==
- Brooke Johnson as Finn
- Yanna McIntosh as Diana
- Maya Ritter as Zelly
- Richard Clarkin as Paul
- Nathalie Toriel as Jamie
- Gilles Lemaire as Xavier
- Andrew Chalmers as Max
- Chantel Cole as Eve
- Gail Maurice as Nancy
