= From C to C: Chinese Canadian Stories of Migration =

- Written by: Jordan Paterson, Paul Yeung, Denise Fong
- Directed by: Jordan Paterson
- Starring: Bill Wong, Charlie Quan, Sid Chow Tan
- Music by: Sanford Livingston
- Country of origin: Canada
- Original languages: English, Mandarin, Cantonese, Taishanese

Production
- Producers: Jordan Paterson and Simon Fraser University
- Cinematography: Jordan Paterson, Norm Li
- Editor: Jordan Paterson
- Running time: 46 minutes
- Production company: Simon Fraser University
- Budget: $300K

Original release
- Network: CBC Television
- Release: 16 July 2011

From C to C: Chinese Canadian Stories of Migration (Chinese: 金山梦——中国与加拿大的故事) is a 2011 documentary film produced and directed by Jordan Paterson. The film premiered on July 16, 2011, on CBC Television.

== Synopsis ==
Filmed in Canada and China's Guangdong province, From C to C contrasts the historical injustices faced by Chinese migrants and their families over the last century with the experiences of contemporary Chinese Canadian youth who embody diverse, transnational identities across Canada today. With interviews in four languages—Cantonese, Mandarin, Taishanese and English—the film conveys the impact of the historical Head Tax and Exclusion Act (1923 - 1947) imposed on Chinese immigrants to Canada. The film features interviews with Chinese Canadian veterans George Chow and Frank Wong, as well as 104-year-old head tax redress activist Charlie Quan.

== Awards and nominations ==
Award	Category	Recipient	Result
2013 Canadian Screen Awards	Best Direction in a Documentary Program or Series; Barbara Sears Award for Best Visual Research; Best Picture Editing in a Documentary Program or Series		Nominated
2012 Horizon Awards	Gold -Training/Instructional website		Won
2012 Horizon Awards	Best in Category - Government Agency		Won
2012 Canadian Network for Innovation in Education	Award of Excellence in the Innovation in the video category		Won
2011 Columbus International Film and Video Festival	Best Documentary Program		Honorable Mention
2011 South China Awards, Guangzhou International Documentary Film Festival	Best Director, Grand Jury Prize for best documentary (Best of Guangdong section)		Won
2011 UCDA Awards	UCDA Award of Excellence, electronic media		Won
2011 Leo Awards	Best one-hour documentary program		Won
2011 Leo Awards	Best Cinematography in a documentary program or series, Best Direction in a documentary program or series, Best Screenwriting		Nominated
