= Douglas Arrowsmith =

Canadian film director and writer

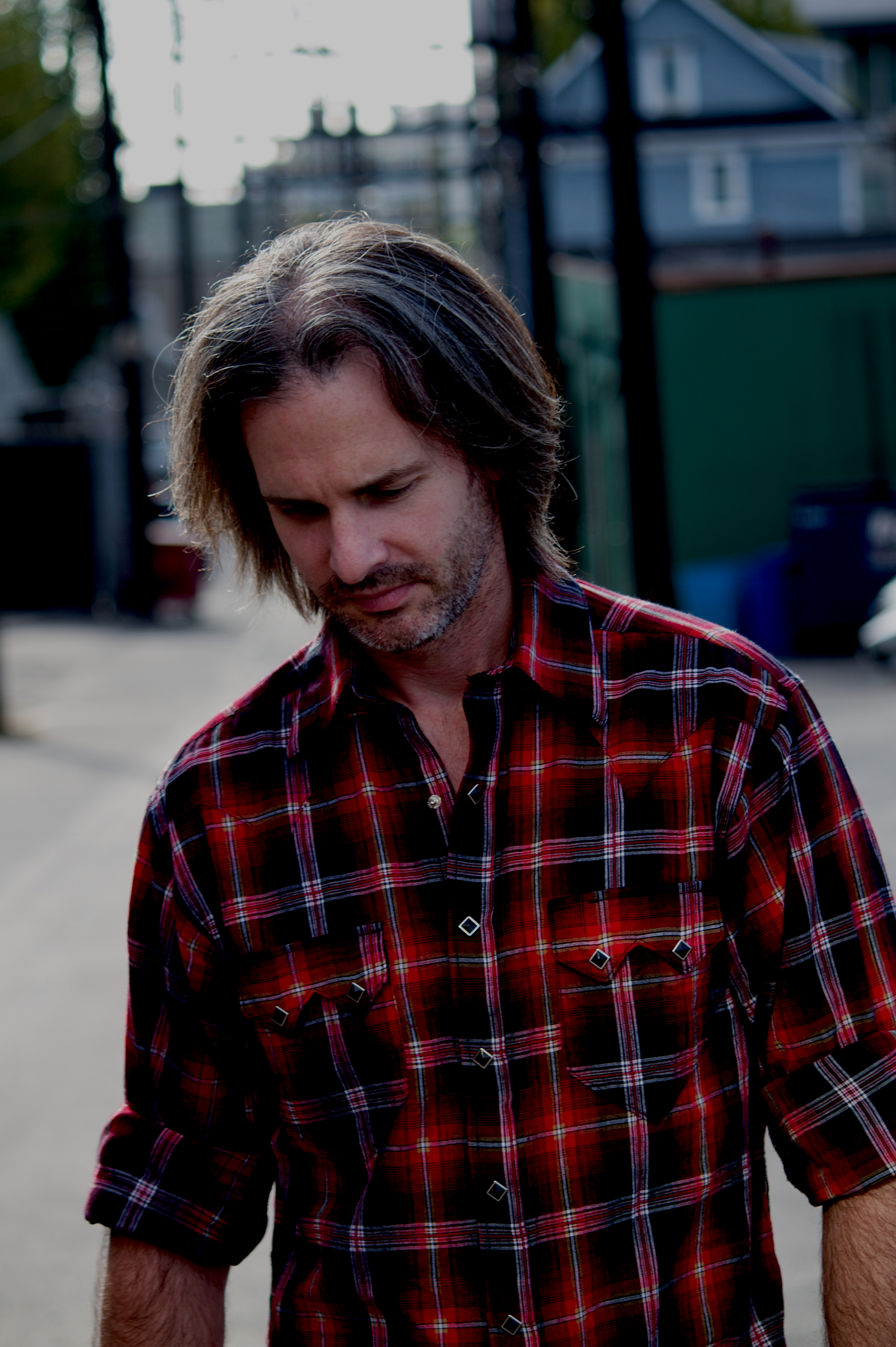

Douglas Arrowsmith is a Canadian film director and writer. He has produced award-winning documentaries for CBC Television, music videos, and feature-length films for BBC Four, The Movie Network and HBO Canada.

== Personal background ==
Arrowsmith received his Ph.D. in Social and Political Thought in 2001 from York University, Canada. His doctoral thesis examines technologies of the self founded in Montaigne's self-essays, Shakespeare's self-dramatisations in the historical plays, and Freud's self-analysis. Part of the research involved a series of field interviews with writers, actors, and singer/songwriters including with Timothy Findley, Peter O’Toole, and Steve Earle, each of whom discussed the concept of ‘mastery’. Arrowsmith's doctoral supervisor was the renowned Canadian sociologist, phenomenologist, and social theorist John O’Neill, F.R.S.C, who would become a friend and mentor for life.

== Film and television ==
Arrowsmith began his television career in 2001 as a producer on CBC News: Sunday, a current affairs program on CBC's main network. During his 10 years as a staff producer he worked on everything from quick-turnaround video features to network specials and documentaries, including As the Towers Fell: Moment by Moment with the Journalists (2002), Deadline Iraq: Uncensored Stories of the War (2003, nominated for Canada's Donald Brittain Award for Best Social/Political documentary), and Tsunami: Untold Stories (2006, nominated for a Gemini Award, Best Direction). He also produced ‘live’ show and video story segments for CBC's flagship Sunday program in the early-mid 2000s with singer/songwriters including Serena Ryder, Kathleen Edwards, Derek Miller, Daniel Lanois, Henry Rollins, Bruce Cockburn, Barenaked Ladies, and William Shatner.

In 2008, Arrowsmith was honored with a Gemini Award, for the short documentary "The Girl Sings Carnegie" that he produced and directed for CBC television about Montreal singer Nikki Yanofsky. The award was presented by the Academy of Canadian Cinema & Television.

In 2009, he produced and directed a feature-length documentary, entitled Memory & Desire: 30 Years in the Wilderness with Stephen Duffy & The Lilac Time, about Stephen (Tin Tin) Duffy, founding member of Duran Duran. The film was nominated for the "Sound & Vision Award" at CPH:DOX in Copenhagen.

In 2010, he wrote, produced, and directed a feature-length film, entitled Love Shines, about Canadian songwriter, Ron Sexsmith. Love Shines won the 2011 Audience Choice Award at SXSW in the "24 Beats per Second" category, and an Audience Choice Award at the 2011 Maui Film Festival.

The film also won two Canadian Screen Awards: Best Performing Arts Documentary and for Best Direction in Performing Arts.

In the film, “Love Shines”, Arrowsmith draws an in-depth essay of Sexsmith's elements of character and gift for songwriting, achieved through an encounter with Ron's (at the time) estranged son and a series of impactful interviews with some of Sexsmith's biggest fans including: Kiefer Sutherland, Elvis Costello, Steve Earle, Leslie Feist, Daniel Lanois, and Bob Rock.

In 2014 Arrowsmith wrote and directed “The Klondike Gold Rush”, a one-hour television documentary that examines the existential range of challenges faced by the women and men who set off to discover gold in the Klondike. It was filmed in 10 days at locations in Dawson City Yukon, Whitehorse, and Dyea, Alaska. The documentary was broadcast on all PBS platforms in America.

== Picture My Face: The Story of Teenage Head ==
In 2020 Arrowsmith produced and directed the feature-length documentary "Picture My Face: The Story of Teenage Head". The film is about Canada's notorious punk rock band Teenage Head (band), from Hamilton Ontario, (commissioned and broadcast as a TVO Original film) and explores founding member and guitar legend Gordie Lewis's struggle with depression following the loss of their frontman Frankie 'Venom' Kerr. It features interviews with Marky Ramone, English writer Jon Savage (England's Dreaming: Sex Pistols and Punk Rock; Teenage: The Creation of Youth Culture) and author Nina Antonia (New York Dolls; Johnny Thunders...In Cold Blood) and The Tragically Hip's Rob Baker.

== Coronation Girls ==
In 2024, Arrowsmith wrote, produced, and directed Coronation Girls, a feature-length documentary produced by FeltFilm Inc. in association with American Public Television. The film follows a group of surviving women who, in 1953, were among fifty young Canadians — known as the "Weston Girls" — selected by the Canadian Education Association to travel to London to attend the Coronation of Queen Elizabeth II, sponsored by Canadian businessman Garfield Weston. Seventy years later, Arrowsmith reunited twelve of the surviving women and brought them back to London to retrace their journey.

The film's production centred on Arrowsmith's negotiation with the Royal Household to secure a surprise appearance by King Charles III during the women's visit to Buckingham Palace, initiated by a personal letter Arrowsmith wrote to the King. The Palace encounter, planned for ten to fifteen minutes, extended to more than thirty minutes. King Charles recalled on camera that Queen Elizabeth II had practised wearing the Crown at bathtime in the days before the 1953 Coronation — a disclosure that generated coverage in the Daily Mail, The Daily Telegraph, The Times, The Independent, and the Evening Standard following a press screening at Buckingham Palace in December 2024.

Coronation Girls had its US premiere on WNED PBS on 26 December 2024 and subsequently broadcast across over 300 PBS member stations. Richard E. Grant appears in the film in a sequence filmed at Fortnum & Mason. Following the film's release, the surviving Weston Girls were among the recipients of the King Charles III Coronation Medal, directly connected to the documentary's role in bringing their story to public attention.

== Stephen Duffy & The Lilac Time ==
Between 2018-2020, while basing in Cornwall, UK, and during ongoing filming of an upcoming new documentary release about Stephen Duffy and The Lilac Time, Arrowsmith produced music videos to support albums and songs that were released for BMG UK, “The Needles” (2019) holiday single release; “Return To Us” (2019); “The Story of Return To Us” (2019 EPK); “I’m A Believer” (2019); and the single “The Hills of Cinnamon” (2020) which was completed partially during the pandemic and filmed in northern Ontario.

== Lloyd Cole ==
In 2019 Arrowsmith was approached by English singer/songwriter Lloyd Cole about video work to support tracks from his album Guesswork. “Night Sweats” (2019 earMusic) features Cole's hands writing, cutting up, and reassembling strips of lyrics on a black background. “Violins” (2019 earMusic) features repurposed video installation work from Scottish artist Douglas Gordon's “The End of Civilisation” an exhibition commissioned by Great North Run Culture and Locus+ and the Arts Council of England.

== Cherry Red Records ==
=== Nicky Haslam ===
In 2013 Arrowsmith was commissioned by UK celebrity designer Nicky Haslam to direct a series of music videos to support the release of the LP "Midnight Matinee, a collection of Haslam's favourite cabaret songs, performed and recorded by Haslam and special guest artists for Cherry Red Records. The videos were designed to capture biographical pieces from Haslam's life and were shot in the UK for the tracks "Total Control", "Illusions" and "Real Live Girl". The video for “Total Control” features Haslam driving across London's Albert Bridge as well as footage of Haslam gaining access to a derelict Romanian ball room in the city of Cluj. "Illusions" (feat. Bryan Ferry) is filmed on 16mm (b/w) at Haslam's famous Hunting Lodge near the ancient Hampshire village of Odiham, previously the home of John Fowler. "Real Live Girl" was shot with cast and crew in London's Soho district with the performance sequences taking place on stage at the Shadow Lounge, Brewer Street. The video was the final of the series and produced by Sonya Sier with cinematography by Jake Scott.

=== Lawrence - Felt ===
In 2017 Arrowsmith was commissioned by English singer, songwriter, and guitarist Lawrence (Felt, Denim and Go Kart Mozart) to produce and direct the first video authorized by the artist since the days of Felt. The video for the track "Depressed" was shot over a period of time at locations in the UK and edited in Toronto, Canada, and officially released in February 2018 by Cherry Red Records.

== Margaret Atwood & the Ursula K. Le Guin Tribute ==
In March 2018 Literary Arts of Portland, Oregon commissioned Arrowsmith to produce and direct Margaret Atwood's tribute to fantasy/science fiction writer, feminist, and essayist Ursula Le Guin (Earthsea series and The Left Hand of Darkness). In the video Atwood reads selected portions from Le Guin's works and states, among other things, that she could always count on her colleague, Le Guin, to "get it." The video was screened as part of a tribute gala on June 13, 2018, at the Arlene Schnitzer Concert Hall, Portland Oregon.

== Witness to a City: David Miller’s Toronto (Book) ==
Arrowsmith is also the co-author of the book Witness to a City: David Miller's Toronto, which presents stories of Toronto citizens who act for the greater public good, following personal loss and hardship. The book was co-authored with former Toronto mayor, David Miller and was nominated for the Heritage Toronto Award in 2011. Arrowsmith conducted in-depth field interviews with each subject who appears in the book, the list includes a group of extraordinary individuals whose stories affected Miller as both a citizen of Toronto and as a vocal leader for social and environmental justice.

== Published works ==
- Arrowsmith, Douglas; and Miller, David. Witness To A City: David Miller's Toronto, Cormorant Books, 2010. ISBN 978-1-897151-80-8
- Arrowsmith, Douglas. Topia: Canadian Journal of Cultural Studies, "Melancholy in the Field of Self-Mastery: Memory, Desire and Lost Objects", 17, pp. 143–149.
- Arrowsmith, Douglas; David Levinson, ed. The Encyclopedia of Human Emotions, "Literature", New York: MacMillan Press, 2000. ISBN 978-0-02-864766-1
