= Johnsons Landing, British Columbia =

Johnsons Landing
- Unincorporated Community
- Location of Johnsons Landing in British Columbia
- Coordinates: 50°04′59″N 116°53′03″W
- Country: Canada
- Province: British Columbia
- Region: West Kootenay
- Regional district: Central Kootenay
- Time zone: UTC-8 (PST)
  - Summer (DST): UTC-7 (PDT)
- Area codes: 250, 778, 236, & 672
- Waterways: Kootenay Lake; Gar Creek

Johnsons Landing is an unincorporated community in the West Kootenay region of southeastern British Columbia. The former steamboat landing comprises scattered rural properties adjacent to the mouth of Gar Creek. To the north is Gardner Creek and to the south is Fry Creek, the three creek mouths on the northeast shore of Kootenay Lake. The locality, via BC Highway 31 and Argenta Rd, is about 121 kilometres (75 mi) northeast of Nelson.

== Name origins ==
The earliest newspaper mention of Johnsons Landing is April 1911, and the census in that year recorded Swedish immigrant Algot Johnson and Robert McKinney as the only residents. However, May 1911 and April 1912 newspaper references placed Johnson at Fry Creek, then regarded as a separate locality.

Fry Creek, likely named for prospector, trapper, and entrepreneur Richard Amherst Fry, is first mentioned regarding the Fry River in 1889, which was demoted to a creek by 1891. The earliest newspaper mention of that settlement was April 1911, and the census in that year recorded a population of 12, 10 of whom were a road building gang. Consequently, it is not unusual for a newspaper to adopt the more established name for the general area when defining Johnson's residence. In 1906, Johnson is believed to have built the first house at Johnsons Landing.

During the early 1910s, Fry Creek Gardens was one of the questionable Kootenay Lake orchard developments promoted by Fred (Honeymoon) Harris. The Fry Creek steamboat landing operated at least until 1923. The 1921 census included Fry Creek as part of the more significant Johnsons Landing.

Walter James Gardner bought 81 hectares (200 acres) at Gardner Creek before 1909. Gardners Landing recorded a population of five in the 1911 census, but the Gardner household was not present at that time. Gardiner Landing was the spelling used for the steamboat landing operating at least between 1913 and 1918. By that time, residents were included under Johnsons Landing in the civic directory, as was the Gardner household in the 1921 census.

== Early community ==
Arthur C. Raper was the inaugural Johnsons Landing postmaster 1917–1949. The locality was known for its apple orchards. In 1928, a telephone line was installed to Lardeau. The next year, the wharf was replaced.

The final year the steamboat flag stop existed was 1949. A general store operated from the late 1940s at least into the mid-1950s.

The population, which was largely farmers, was about 20 by 1918, 35 by 1927, 48 by 1934, 30 by 1943, 32 by 1948, and 27 by 1953.

During 1953, the 3.7-metre (12 ft) wide Argenta–Johnsons Landing road was constructed, following the forestry trail.

The back-to-the-land movement began during the late 1960s, with the arrival of hippies, US draft dodgers, and deserters. During 1966–1967, work on the Duncan Dam construction provided additional income that assisted these new farming ventures.

The post office closed in 1970.

== Later community ==
A small community hall serves local needs and the Johnsons Landing Retreat Centre caters to visitors. Fry Creek Canyon offers hiking.

In a community of about 35 permanent residents, a landslide down Gar Creek on July 12, 2012 failed to negotiate a sharp bend, climbed a ridge and spread out. The debris killed four people, decimated five houses, took out the road, and destroyed much of the water supply infrastructure. A report from the regional government in 2013 determined the slide was caused by a late snow melt and heavy rain. A second slide the following day narrowly missed emergency responders, residents and journalists. Two years after the landslide, the last of the evacuated residents were allowed to return to their homes.

Between Johnsons Landing and Argenta, a 32.5-hectare (80-acre) subdivision called Bulmer's Pointe has been created, comprising 25 lakeside lots and eight wilderness lots.

Johnsons Landing was one of the communities benefitting from a fibre-optic cable installed deep in Kootenay Lake in 2019 by the Kaslo infoNet Society.
