= Nancy Palk =

Canadian actress

- Born: 1956 (age 69–70)
- Occupation: Actress
- Spouse: Joseph Ziegler (died 2025)
- Children: 3

Nancy Palk (born 1956) is a Canadian actress, most noted as one of the founding members of the Soulpepper theatre company.

Originally from Winnipeg, Manitoba, Palk studied English at Queen's University, later studying at the National Theatre School of Canada in their Acting program. She has spent her career as an actress based in Toronto, Ontario.

She has been a six-time Dora Mavor Moore Award nominee for Best Lead Actress, General Theatre, receiving nods in 1988 for I Am Yours, in 1994 for Dancing at Lughnasa, in 1996 for The Glorious 12th, in 1998 for Molly Sweeney, in 1999 for Don Carlos, and in 2014 for Angels in America.

In 2020 she received a nomination in the Best Leading Performer, General Theatre category for August: Osage County.

She has also had film and television roles, most notably a recurring role as Betsy in the television series Rogue, and a major role in the 2018 film Catch and Release. However, she has noted in interviews that as a woman who is almost six feet tall, she has often been passed over by film and television casting directors.

She was married to actor Joseph Ziegler until his death in 2025. They acted together in several shows including Death of a Salesman, Long Day's Journey Into Night and A Tender Thing, a play by Ben Power which reimagines William Shakespeare's Romeo and Juliet as an elderly couple confronting mortality.

Her first cousin is Alix Palk, mother of comic actor Will Arnett.
