= Karyn Pugliese =

Canadian investigative journalist

Karyn Pugliese (Pabàmàdiz) is a Canadian investigative journalist. She is a citizen of the Algonquins of Pikwàkanagàn First Nation in Ontario and a status Indian under Canada's Indian Act. She was the first Indigenous person to be elected as President of the Canadian Association of Journalists. Pugliese was chosen for the twenty-fifth Martin Wise Goodman Canadians as Nieman Fellow, and graduated in the Class of 2020, Harvard University. She is best known for her work as a journalist/executive director of news and current affairs at the Aboriginal Peoples Television Network, and as the host of ichannel's #FAQMP.

== Early life ==
Pugliese was born and raised in Ottawa, Ontario, but frequently visited Pikwàkanagàn in her youth. Most of her close family lived off-reserve in Ottawa. After graduating Pugliese worked short-term contracts at CBC Radio Ottawa's Morning Show, Sounds Like Canada and CTV television, Ottawa. For a time she left journalism and worked as a technical writer in the federal government. Around this time she returned to Carleton University to complete an M.A. in history. Her thesis 'So, where are you from?' Glimpsing the history of Ottawa-Gatineau's urban Indian communities is a history of the off-reserve community she grew up in.

== Education ==
Pugliese graduated from the Ottawa Alternative High School program. She graduated with a combined honours in Journalism and History from Carleton University in 1998, and earned a master's degree in history at Carleton University in 2006. Pugliese graduated from the Nieman Fellowship at Harvard University in 2020.

== Awards and honours ==
Pugliese has been recognized by the Canadian Association of Journalists with two Charles Bury Awards, once for her leadership supporting journalists and fighting for media rights (2016) and again (2023) for changing the way Canadian media covers Indigenous stories. In 2018 the Academy of Canadian Cinema and Television presented Pugliese with the organization's annual Gordon Sinclair Award for distinguished achievement in journalism at the 6th Canadian Screen Awards. In 2019 Pugliese received the Hyman Solomon Award for Public Policy Journalism and was the co-recipient with journalist Justin Brake for the Native American Journalists Association (NAJA) 2019 Elias Boudinot Free Press Award. She was chosen for the twenty-fifth Martin Wise Goodman Canadian Nieman Fellowship at Harvard University. She won a National Newspaper Award for a series of columns written for the National Observer in 2021, where she was editor-in-chief.

== Advocacy (Press Freedom) ==
Pugliese was president of the Canadian Association of Journalists (2018-2020) and continues to sit on the board (2020 -2024 ). She previously sat on the CAJ Ethics Committee. Pugliese has acted as a co-chair for the Night for Rights Gala, an event which raises approximately $140,000 annually for rights-based journalism programming, and is organized by Journalist for Human Rights, JHR. Pugliese is an ambassador for Journalist for Human Rights, and works with them to train young indigenous journalists. She was an expert trainer for journalists in South Sudan. Pugliese is also a board member for Canadian Journalists for Free Expression (CJFE).

== Career ==
=== Aboriginal Peoples Television Network (APTN) ===
In 2000, Pugliese became the APTN's first Parliamentary Correspondent. She credits the APTN's daycare policy and flexible hours for her ability to re-enter journalism and build a career. From 2000 to 2006 Pugliese was a member of the Press Gallery and APTN's Parliamentary Reporter. She also travelled to many Indigenous communities, mostly in Ontario, Quebec and Nunavut. During her time at APTN Pugliese won 3 Native American Journalism Awards and was nominated for a Canadian Association of Broadcasters Gold Ribbon Award. Pugliese left APTN in 2006.

=== 360 Vision, Vision TV ===
In 2006, Pugliese joined Vision TV's investigative and current affairs show 360 Vision then led by Sadia Zaman and John Scully. That year the series was a nominee for Best News and Information Series at the 2006 Gemini Awards. Pugliese left after one season.

=== Assembly of First Nations ===
Pugliese joined the Assembly of First Nations as a communications officer in 2007. In this role she also worked with the World Health Organization, and the United Nations. A year later she was promoted to Communications Director. She left the AFN in 2010.

=== ichannel and #FAQMP ===
In 2010 Pugliese returned to journalism, hosting and producing @issue, ichannel's current affairs talk show. In 2011 Pugliese hosted and produced a new flagship program #FAQMP (Frequently Asked Questions for your Member of Parliament). The show was described as an experiment in democracy, and with its hyper-local focus it was favourably compared to a modern twist on Geoff Scott's 1968 Show Your Man on the Hill. #FAQMP invited viewers to vote on a website and choose which MP they wanted to appear on the show. Viewers were then invited to submit their own interview questions and topics via social media. Among the MPs who appeared on the show were: Justin Trudeau, Jason Kenney, Dean Del Mastro, Elizabeth May, Bob Rae, Carolyn Bennett, Joy Smith, Pat Martin, and Senator Patrick Brazeau.

Some controversial episodes included: PEI Liberal MP Sean Casey's admission that he did not support his own party's 2012 resolution on abortion that would penalize any province that restricted women's access to abortion (by cutting federal health transfer dollars). Green Party Leader Elizabeth May's assertion that political parties should be eliminated, and all MPs elected independently also caused a stir. The clip resurfaced and caused debate on reddit in 2014.

The series garnered a nomination for Best Cross-Platform Project, Non-Fiction at the 1st Canadian Screen Awards.

Pugliese left in 2012, returning to APTN. #FAQMP lasted for 1 more season under a new host, Kevin O'Keefe.

=== Aboriginal Peoples Television Network (APTN) ===
In 2012, Pugliese returned to the APTN to lead the news department as the executive director of News and Current Affairs. Since her arrival, new programming has been added to the News Department including: Nation to Nation, a half hour political show, and the talk shows InFocus and The Laughing Drum. During the 2015 federal election, for the first time, APTN National News secured interviews with 3 out of 4 of the national party leaders.

In 2017, Pugliese was awarded the Canadian Association of Journalists Charles Bury Award, by then CAJ President Nick Taylor-Vaisey. In particular Taylor-Vaisey noted Pugliese's contributions to fighting for press freedom.

"When it comes to supporting journalists and fighting for journalism, APTN punches above its weight," said Taylor-Vaisey. "They fight for press freedom in the courts..."

In her acceptance speech Pugliese recounted some of the early struggles of setting up the "first aboriginal broadcaster in the world" adding: "Yes. We punched above our weight, how could we not with so much at stake?"

=== Managing Editor Investigative (CBC) ===
As managing editor of investigative for the CBC from 2021, Pugliese oversaw The Fifth Estate, and Marketplace, two award-winning investigative English-language Canadian news magazine television programs.

=== Executive Editor National Observer ===
Pugliese was the executive editor of Canada's National Observer, a daily online news service focused on climate change.
