= Trevor Owens =

American librarian and archivist

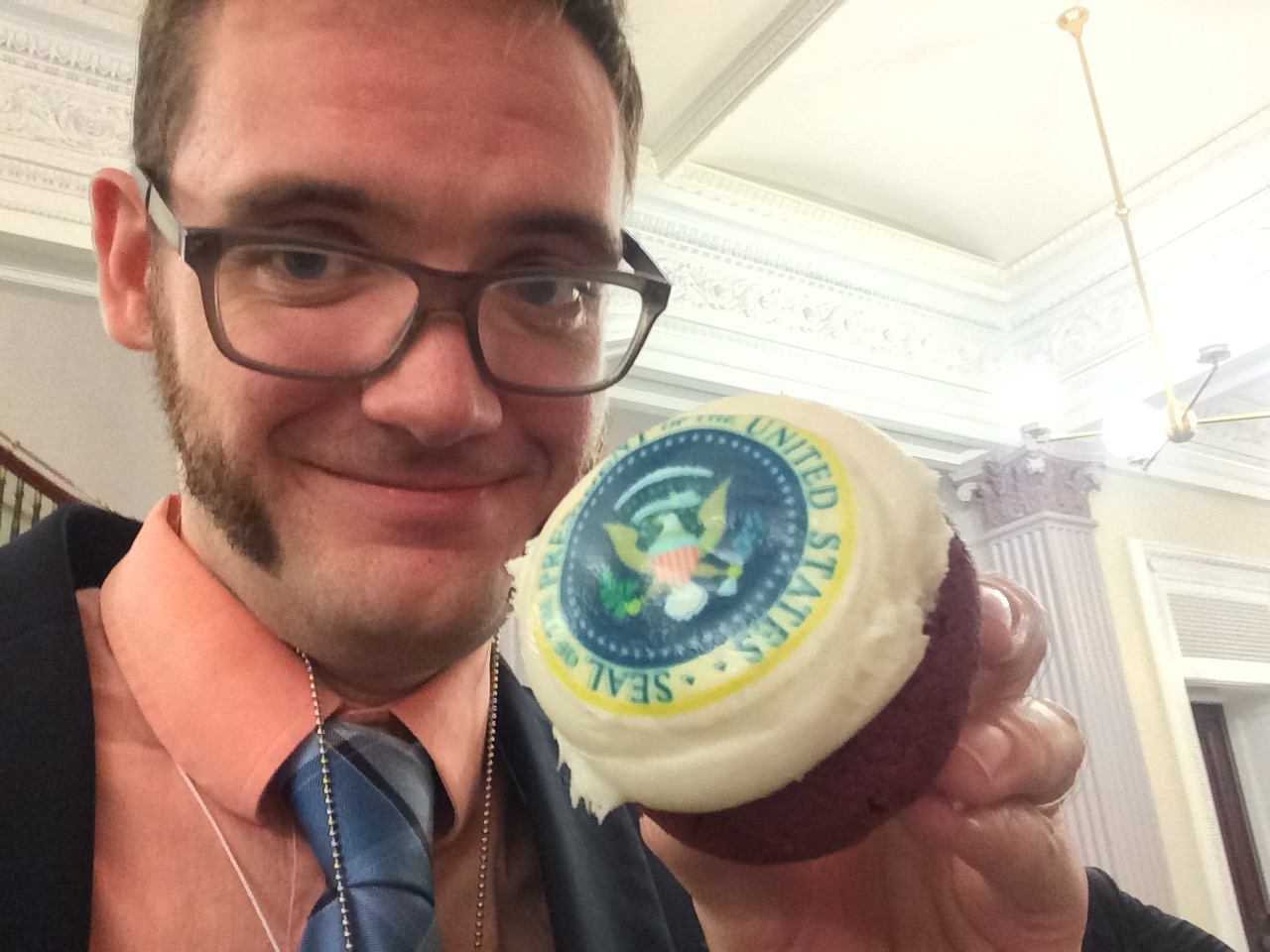
Owens in 2015

Trevor J. Owens (born February 21, 1985) is an American librarian and archivist. He currently serves as the Chief Research Officer for American Institute of Physics. He previously served as the Head of Digital Content Management at the Library of Congress. Prior to that, he was the Senior Program Officer responsible for the development of the National Digital Platform portfolio at the Institute of Museum and Library Services, and worked as a Digital Archivist with the National Digital Information Infrastructure and Preservation Program. In 2014, the Society of American Archivists granted him the Archival Innovator Award, presented annually to recognize the archivist, repository, or organization that best exemplifies the “ability to think outside the professional norm.”

Owens was raised in West Allis, Wisconsin. He studied the History of Science at the University of Wisconsin Madison where he wrote his undergraduate honors thesis on the history of children's books about Albert Einstein and Marie Curie. While studying digital history at George Mason University he was awarded the C. W. Bright Pixel Prize for the Best History and New Media Project. He completed a Ph.D. at George Mason where his doctoral thesis focused on the history of online community software systems. His dissertation work became the basis of his book Designing Online Communities.

== Bibliography ==
- Owens, Trevor (2009). Fairfax County. Charleston, SC: Arcadia Publishing. ISBN 978-0-7385-6631-3.
- Owens, Trevor (2009). "Going to School with Madame Curie and Mr. Einstein: Gender Roles in Children's Science Biographies". Cultural Studies of Science Education. 4 (4): 929–943. Bibcode:2009CSSE....4..929O. doi:10.1007/s11422-009-9177-6. S2CID 145243125.
- Owens, Trevor; Gibbs, Fred (October 12, 2012). "DHQ: Digital Humanities Quarterly: Building Better Digital Humanities Tools: Toward Broader Audiences and User-Centered Designs". Digital Humanities Quarterly. 006 (2).
- Gibbs, Fred; Owens, Trevor (2013). "The Hermeneutics of Data and Historical Writing". In Kristen Nawrotzki; Jack Dougherty (eds.). Writing History in the Digital Age. University of Michigan Press. hdl:2027/spo.12230987.0001.001. ISBN 978-0-472-07206-4.
- Owens, Trevor (2013). "Digital Cultural Heritage and the Crowd". Curator: The Museum Journal. 56 (1): 121–130. doi:10.1111/cura.12012. ISSN 2151-6952.
- Phillips, Megan; Bailey, Jefferson; Goethals, Andrea; Owens, Trevor (2013). "The NDSA Levels of Digital Preservation: Explanation and Uses". Archiving Conference. 10 (1): 216–222. doi:10.2352/issn.2168-3204.2013.10.1.art00047.
- Mir, Rebecca; Owens, Trevor (2013). "Modeling Indigenous Peoples: Unpacking Ideology in Sid Meier's Colonization". In Kappell, Matthew Wilhelm; Elliott, Andrew B.R. (eds.). Playing with the Past: Digital Games and the Simulation of History. New York: Bloomsbury Academic. pp. 91–106. ISBN 9781623566142.
- Owens, Trevor (2015). Designing Online Communities: How Designers, Developers, Community Managers, and Software Structure Discourse and Knowledge Production on the Web. New York: Peter Lang. doi:10.3726/978-1-4539-1502-8 (inactive 3 September 2025). ISBN 9781433128479.
- Owens, Trevor (2018). The Theory and Craft of Digital Preservation. Baltimore: Johns Hopkins University Press. doi:10.1353/book.62324. ISBN 9781421426976.
- Owens, Trevor (2024). After Disruption: A Future for Cultural Memory. Ann Arbor: University of Michigan Press. doi:10.3998/mpub.12410213. ISBN 978-0-472-90436-5.
