= The Hangman's Bride =

1996 Canadian short film

- Directed by: Naomi McCormack
- Written by: Naomi McCormack
- Produced by: Naomi McCormack
- Starring: Shawn Doyle; Allegra Fulton
- Cinematography: Jonathan Freeman
- Edited by: Josephine Massarella
- Music by: Nicholas Stirling
- Release date: August 27, 1996 (MWFF)
- Running time: 20 minutes
- Country: Canada
- Language: English

The Hangman's Bride is a Canadian historical drama short film, directed by Naomi McCormack and released in 1996. Based on the true story of Jean Corolère and Françoise Laurent, prisoners in New France who escaped the death penalty when Corolère accepted the job of executioner and married Laurent, the film stars Shawn Doyle as Corolère and Allegra Fulton as Laurent.

The film premiered at the Montreal World Film Festival in August 1996, but was distributed primarily as an episode of the CBC Television anthology series Canadian Reflections.

Reviewing the television broadcast for The Globe and Mail, John Doyle wrote, "Tape this great little film for later and, please, somebody in the TV and film industry let the director make a feature. The Hangman's Bride is a short, gorgeously made little drama based on the true story of a woman in 1750 Quebec who escaped the gallows by marrying the hangman...Director Naomi McCormack shows great flair employing small filmic resources to startlingly expand a short story. She wants to make a feature-length version, and so she should." Marc Horton of the Edmonton Journal also praised the film as fascinating and well-acted, although he criticized its title for giving away what should have been a surprise twist ending.

The film won the Genie Award for Best Live Action Short Drama at the 18th Genie Awards.

After making the film, Doyle and Fulton married in real life.
