= Dominique Cardona =

Canadian film director

- Born: 1955 (age 70–71); Algeria
- Citizenship: Algeria, Canada
- Occupations: Film director, Screenwriter

Dominique Cardona (born 1955) is an Algerian-born Canadian film director, producer, and screenwriter. She works primarily but not exclusively in collaboration with Laurie Colbert. The duo are most noted for their 1999 short film Below the Belt, which was a Genie Award nominee for Best Live Action Short Drama at the 21st Genie Awards in 2000, and their feature film Margarita, which won the Audience Award for Best Feature Film at the Inside Out Film and Video Festival in 2012.

Their other films have included the documentary shorts Thank God I'm a Lesbian (1992) and My Feminism (1997) and the feature films Finn's Girl (2007) and Catch and Release (2018).

Separately from Colbert, Cardona has also directed episodes of the television series Amélie et compagnie.
