= 12th Canadian Comedy Awards =

Festival and awards ceremony for works of 2010

- Date: 17 October 2011
- Location: Isabel Bader Theatre; Toronto, Ontario
- Country: Canada
- Presented by: Canadian Comedy Foundation for Excellence
- Hosted by: Steve Patterson

Highlights
- Most wins: Television: Less Than Kind (2); Film: Good Neighbours, Summerhood (2); Person: Ron Pederson (2)
- Most nominations: Television: Call Me Fitz, Caution: May Contain Nuts (3); Film: Peepers (5); Radio: The Debaters (2); Person: Debra DiGiovanni, Nikki Payne, Ron Pederson (2)
- Website: www.canadiancomedyawards.org

The 12th Canadian Comedy Awards, presented by the Canadian Comedy Foundation for Excellence (CCFE), honoured the best live, television, film, and Internet comedy of 2010. The ceremony was hosted by Steve Patterson and held at the Isabel Bader Theatre in Toronto, Ontario, on 17 October 2011.

Canadian Comedy Awards, also known as Beavers, were awarded in 24 categories. Winners in 5 categories were chosen by the public through an online poll and others were chosen by members of industry organizations. The awards ceremony was held during the five-day Canadian Comedy Awards Festival which ran from 13 to 17 October.

The film Peepers led with five nominations followed by the films Good Neighbours and Summerhood with four each. The CBC show The Debaters, which moved from radio to television, was nominated twice for audio and twice for television. Good Neighbours and Summerhood each won two Beavers, as did the TV series Less Than Kind, and Ron Pederson won twice for his improvisation work with National Theatre of the World. Samantha Bee won the Beaver for Canadian Comedy Person of the Year.

== Festival and ceremony ==
The Canadian Comedy Awards (CCA) was held in Toronto, Ontario, for a fifth non-consecutive year. The awards ceremony was hosted by Steve Patterson and held on 17 October 2011 at the Isabel Bader Theatre, concluding the Canadian Comedy Awards Festival. The five-day festival, held from 13 to 17 October, featured live comedy performances by nominees at five Toronto venues including Yuk Yuk's, Second City, and Comedy Bar. Shaun Majumder hosted a showcase performance of the top stand-up acts at the Panasonic Theatre. The festival also included workshops by leading comedy professionals.

The CCA's parent organization, the Canadian Comedy Foundation for Excellence (CCFE), had partnered with Canada's Walk of Fame to produce an evening of Canadian comedy as part of the three-day Walk of Fame Festival. Federal grant money went toward producing the event, which in turn had helped support and promote the CCA festival.

== Winners and nominees ==
Nominees submitted to the Canadian Comedy Awards were considered by 170 jury members. The jury reduced the list of submissions to a top-five in each category which was announced on 9 June 2011 at Toronto's Second City theatre. Online voting was held from 15 June to 5 July. Six to seven thousand members of the public viewed brief performance clips on the website and voted for best TV show, best film, best web clip, best radio program or clip, and comedy person of the year. The other categories were voted on by industry members from the Alliance of Canadian Cinema, Television and Radio Artists (ACTRA), Canadian Actors' Equity Association, the Directors Guild of Canada, the Writers Guild of Canada, and the Comedy Association. The jury's choices counted for 30% of the total marks.

Gigcity noted that Edmonton was well-represented at this year's CCAs, with three nominations to locally-produced Caution: May Contain Nuts, two nominees each for best male improvisor and for best improv troupe, and a nominee for best radio show. This was credited to the city's strong improv scene.

Winners are listed first and highlighted in boldface:

=== Multimedia ===
Canadian Comedy Person of the Year	Best Radio Program or Clip
**Samantha Bee**; Russell Peters; Ron James; Howie Mandel; Roger Abbott	**This Is That** – Pat Kelly and Peter Oldring; The Debaters – Pete Zedlacher and Kristeen von Hagen: "Zombies vs. Vampires"; The Irrelevant Show – episode 1; Lars Callieou, Keith Sarnoski and Bobcat Goldthwait – "Kamikaze Komedy" – CJSR 88.5 FM; The Debaters – Seán Cullen and Alonzo Bodden: "Summer vs Winter Olympics"

=== Live ===
Best Taped Live Performance	Best Stand-up Newcomer
**Nikki Payne – Halifax Comedy Fest 2010**; Chuck Byrn – Halifax Comedy Fest 2010; Tim Steeves – CCA's 10 Year Anniversary Special; Nick Beaton – Comedy Now!; Ron Josol – Ethnical Difficulties	**Eric Andrews**; Rhiannon Archer; Matt Carter; Dylan Gott; D.J. Demers
Best Male Stand-up	Best Female Stand-up
**Steve Patterson**; Mark Forward; Darrin Rose; Tim Steeves; Jeremy Hotz	**Debra DiGiovanni**; Heidi Foss; Laurie Elliott; Nikki Payne; DeAnne Smith
Best Male Improviser	Best Female Improviser
**Ron Pederson**, National Theatre of the World; Mark Meer; Jeff Gladstone; Taz VanRassel; Ryan Beil	**Sarah Hillier**; Ashley Botting; Inessa Frantowski; Caitlin Howden; Mandy Sellers
Best Sketch Troupe or Company	Best Improv Troupe or Company
**Picnicface**; The Second City; Women Fully Clothed; Falcon Powder; Hot Thespian Action	**National Theatre of the World**, **Impromptu Spelendor**; Rapid Fire Theatre; Cast of Die-Nasty; The Sunday Service; Urban Improv
Best One Person Show	Best Comedic Play, Revue or Series
**Cancer Can't Dance Like This**, **Daniel Stolfi**; Raccoonery!; ONEymoon; Beer League; NormVsCancer	**The Second City**, **Something Wicked Awesome This Way Comes**; Phillips & Crown (Note: Phillips & Crown: Our Lives Work is the a capella operetta show of Kathleen Phillips and Katie Crown); My Mother's Lesbian Jewish Wiccan Wedding; Dr. Whom (Note: Doctor Whom is an improv parody by the troupe Approximately 3 Peters, comprising Peter Gal, Peter Hill and Ian MacIntyre.); Pick of the Fringe!

=== Television ===
Best TV Show	Best Performance by an Ensemble
**This Movie Sucks!**; Living in Your Car; Fancy; Call Me Fitz; Less Than Kind	**James Harnett, Hannah Hogan, Alana Johnston, Kayla Lorette, Joey Lucius, Alex Spencer, AJ Vaage** – **That's So Weird!**; Dana Andersen, Matt Alden, Aimée Beaudoin, Sheldon Elter, Jeff Halaby, James Higuchi, Howie Miller, Mark Meer, Ryan Parker – Caution: May Contain Nuts; Brendan Gall, Siobhan Murphy, William C. Vaughan, Anand Rajaram, Joel Keller, Aliyah O'Brien, Glenda Braganza, Paul Gross – Men with Brooms; Fred Ewanuick, Mary Ashton, Paul Bates, Benjamin Ayres, David Ferry – Dan for Mayor, episode 110; Stacey Farber, Alain Goulem, Angela Asher, Jesse Rath, Kaniehtiio Horn, Ellen David, Arielle Shiri, Peter Keleghan, Michael Seater, Erin Agostino – 18 To Life, episode 201
Best Performance by a Male	Best Performance by a Female
**Jason Priestley** – **Call Me Fitz**; Howie Miller – Caution: May Contain Nuts; Mark O'Brien – Republic of Doyle; Pat Thornton – Sketchersons TV; Ennis Esmer – The Listener	**Brooke Palsson** – **Less Than Kind**; Aimée Beaudoin – Caution: May Contain Nuts; Nancy Robertson – Hiccups; Angela Asher – 18 To Life, episode 205; Sitara Hewitt – Little Mosque on the Prairie
Best Direction in a Program or Series	Best Writing in a Program or Series
**James Dunnison** – **Less Than Kind**; Sebastian Cluer and Ian MacDonald – "A Kenny vs. Spenny Christmas Special"; Henry Sarwer-Foner – Rick Mercer Report; Adam Brodie and Dave Derewlany – Scare Tactics; Brian K. Roberts – The Debaters	**Ken Finkleman** – **Good Dog**; Paul Mather, Mike McPhaden, Renee Percy, James Phillips, Kurt Smeaton, Graham Wagner – Men with Brooms, "Wedding Knells"; Tim McAuliffe, Mark Critch, Cathy Jones, Gavin Crawford, Kyle Tingley, Albert Howell, Dean Jenkinson, Mike Allison, David Kerr, Bob Kerr – This Hour Has 22 Minutes, episode 5; Sheri Elwood – Call Me Fitz, episode 101; Graham Clark, Gary Jones, Richard Side, John Wing Jr., Nathan Macintosh, Dave Hemstad, Debra DiGiovanni – The Debaters

=== Film ===
Best Performance by a Male	Best Performance by a Female
**Jay Baruchel** – **Good Neighbours**; Tim Doiron – GravyTrain; Jacob Medjuck – Summerhood; Joe Cobden – Peepers; Craig Brown – Don't Walk Out That Door	**Maria del Mar** – **A Touch of Grey**; Sandi Ross – Medium Raw: Night of the Wolf; Angela Asher – A Touch of Grey; Janine Theriault – Peepers; Inessa Frantowski – Don't Walk Out That Door
Best Direction	Best Writing
**Jacob Medjuck** – **Summerhood**; Jacob Tierney – Good Neighbours; Jeremy Lalonde – The Untitled Work of Paul Shepard; Jesse Shamata – Break A Leg; Seth W. Owen – Peepers	**Jacob Tierney** – **Good Neighbours**; Jacob Medjuck – Summerhood; Seth W. Owen, Mark Slutsky, Daniel Perlmutter – Peepers; Simon Fraser, Brian G. Smith – Improvisation Nation; Tim Doiron – GravyTrain
Best Film
**Summerhood**; GravyTrain; Good Neighbours; Peepers; Don't Walk Out That Door

=== Internet ===
Best Web Clip
- "**That Thing That Happened**"
- "Fresh Talks I Luv All The Special Girl"
- "I Am The Man"
- "Phone Call to an Ex-girlfriend"
- "Suburbanite"

=== Special awards ===
Dave Broadfoot Award	Roger Abbott Award
**Jayne Eastwood**	**Cory Mack**

== Multiple wins ==
The following people, shows, films, etc. received multiple awards

Awards	Person or work
2	Good Neighbours
2	Less Than Kind
2	Ron Pederson
2	Summerhood

== Multiple nominations ==
The following people, shows, films, etc. received multiple nominations

Nominations	Person or work
5	Peepers
3	Call Me Fitz
3	Caution: May Contain Nuts
3	The Debaters
3	Don't Walk Out That Door
3	Good Neighbours
3	GravyTrain
3	Less Than Kind
2	Debra DiGiovanni
2	Nikki Payne
2	Ron Pederson
