= Tyson Houseman =

Canadian artist, filmmaker and actor (born 1990)

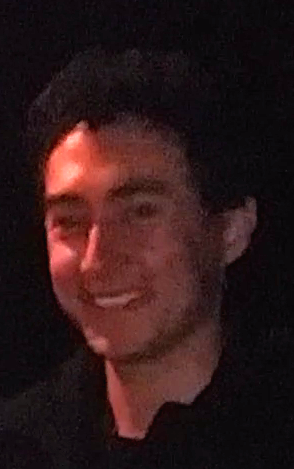
- Tyson Houseman
- Born: 1990 (age 35–36); Edmonton, Alberta, Canada
- Occupations: Artist, filmmaker, actor
- Years active: 2009–present
- Website: tysonhouseman.com

Tyson Houseman (born 1990) is a Cree artist and filmmaker from Edmonton, Alberta. He makes short films and live video performances, including Endless Sunlight (2026), selected for imagineNATIVE, the Vancouver International Film Festival and the BFI London Film Festival, and the multimedia opera askîwan (2025). He is also an actor, and played Quil Ateara in three films of The Twilight Saga between 2009 and 2011.

== Early life and education ==
Houseman was born in Edmonton in 1990. He is the eldest of the four sons of the comedian Howie Miller, a writer and cast member on the APTN sketch series Caution: May Contain Nuts. He is Plains Cree (nêhiyaw), with family from Paul First Nation and Ermineskin Cree Nation in Alberta.

He graduated from Victoria School of the Arts in Edmonton in 2008 and trained at Seacoast Theatre Centre in Vancouver. He later completed a BFA in theatre performance at Concordia University in Montreal and an MFA at the School of Visual Arts in New York.

== Career ==
=== Film acting ===
Three months into his training in Vancouver, Houseman answered an online open casting call for Indigenous performers aged 15 to 25; it was his first film audition. He was cast as Quil Ateara, a member of the wolf pack, in The Twilight Saga: New Moon (2009), and returned to the role in Eclipse (2010) and Breaking Dawn – Part 1 (2011). In June 2011 he taught an acting workshop for Aboriginal youth at the Dreamspeakers Film Festival in Edmonton, and by the end of that year he was studying acting at Concordia University in Montreal.

=== Puppetry and early performance ===
Houseman has worked with Bread and Puppet Theater in Vermont since 2015, including as summer staff, and has toured since 2016 as a puppeteer in Kid Koala's live productions, among them Nufonia Must Fall, The Storyville Mosquito and Vinyl Vaudeville. He performed in Nufonia Must Fall at Le Diamant in Quebec City in December 2024 and in The Storyville Mosquito at the East Kowloon Cultural Centre in Hong Kong in February 2026. In March 2019 he created KĀHKĀKIW with Kyla Gilbert and Jamie Ross at OBORO in Montreal, presented with the Festival de Casteliers; the piece combined video, dance and Bunraku-inspired puppetry, with sound by Devon Bate.

=== The Six Seasons ===
The Six Seasons, a live video opera, began as Houseman's MFA thesis performance at the School of Visual Arts, staged in a former sound recording hall in the Pfizer Building in Brooklyn. On 25 July 2024 he performed kenopsia, a live video piece drawn from it, at the opening of the exhibition Non-Sovereign Poetics at the SVA Chelsea Gallery. The Shed in New York chose The Six Seasons for Open Call, a commissioning program that picked 17 artists from nearly 1,000 proposals, and presented it as an installation and performance sung in Plains Cree in the group exhibition Open Call: Portals from 27 June to 24 August 2025, with performances on 27 and 28 June. He developed it during a spring 2025 residency at Baryshnikov Arts with the baritone Jonathon Adams, the composer Devon Bate and the viola da gamba player Leah Weitzner. The Brooklyn Paper described the piece as a tribute to his Plains Cree roots, organized around the six seasons of the nêhiyaw calendar and including a song in Cree written with his grandfather.

=== askîwan ===
askîwan ᐊᐢᑮᐊᐧᐣ, which La Presse called a multimedia opera, opened the programme of the 19th OFFTA festival in Montreal at Théâtre de Quat'Sous on 23 May 2025. It returned to Montreal at La Chapelle Scènes Contemporaines in late November 2025 and played the PuSh International Performing Arts Festival in Vancouver on 29 and 30 January 2026. On stage Houseman films a miniature set with live cameras and projects the images at large scale, while Bate, Adams and Weitzner perform a score sung in nêhiyawêwin. Houseman's website describes The Six Seasons as the installation version of askîwan.

Reviewing the La Chapelle run for Westmount Magazine, Sophie Jama wrote that Elders' teachings on circular time shape the work. Darragh Kilkenny-Mondoux of NicheMTL read it as a lament for climate damage made with ordinary consumer technology, and Matthew Fraser of CJSF found the Vancouver performance calm and introspective.

=== Film and video ===
Endless Sunlight (2026, 8 minutes), which Houseman wrote, directed and produced, had its Ontario premiere at the imagineNATIVE Film and Media Arts Festival in June 2026. It was then programmed in the Short Forum at the Vancouver International Film Festival and in the Experimenta strand of the BFI London Film Festival, where it screened at the Institute of Contemporary Arts on 15 October 2026 in the shorts programme The Chorus that Carries. The BFI programme note describes the film as his grandmother's testimony, carried across five generations of her family.

An earlier short, Collapsing Wave Function (2025, 6 minutes), was chosen by the artist Sky Hopinka for an e-flux screening on 9 May 2026. In November 2026 his website listed Caustics, an 82-minute documentary commissioned by COUSIN Collective and built on teachings from his grandfather, as in post-production for release in 2027.

== Exhibitions and residencies ==
Houseman and Jessica Reisch showed Rhizomorph at Locust Projects in Miami from 13 June to 6 July 2024, after their proposal was picked from a national open call to MFA students. In September 2024 he made the video projections for 1 / Lament, a Manitoba Chamber Orchestra concert at the University of Manitoba with the baritone Jonathon Adams. In 2026 he was one of eight artists in la clarté creuse les montagnes at the Musée d'art de Joliette (7 February to 17 May), curated by Ariane De Blois, and Dazibao in Montreal presented his solo exhibition NDN Time from 11 September to 31 October. In March 2026 he performed pakone-kisik, a live piece for dome projection, at EMMEDIA's Particle + Wave festival in Calgary.

He was a MacDowell fellow and a Forge Project fellow in 2025, and a resident artist at Art Omi in 2026. His website also lists residencies at Wassaic Project and the Banff Centre, and music videos he directed or edited for The Weather Holds (2023) and for Adams (2024).

== Selected works ==
Titles and years as listed on his website.

- KĀHKĀKIW (2019), performance with puppetry
- Rhizomorph (2024), installation, with Jessica Reisch
- kenopsia (2024), live video performance and installation
- The Six Seasons (2025), video performance and installation
- askîwan ᐊᐢᑮᐊᐧᐣ (2025), live cinema performance
- Collapsing Wave Function (2025), single-channel video
- Endless Sunlight (2026), single-channel video
- pakone-kisik (2026), performance for dome projection
- NDN Time (2026), four-channel video
- Caustics (expected 2027), feature documentary

== Filmography ==
Year	Title	Role	Notes
2009	The Twilight Saga: New Moon	Quil	Film
2010	The Twilight Saga: Eclipse	Quil	Film
2011	The Twilight Saga: Breaking Dawn – Part 1	Quil	Film
