= La fille du facteur =

Canadian theatrical work

La fille du facteur (The Postman's Daughter) is an autobiographical theatrical work by Josée Thibeault. Extracts from it were first performed in 2017, and it was published as a complete work in 2023.

== Synopsis ==
La fille du facteur is an autobiographical narrative for one performer composed of a mixture of theatrical elements, including spoken word poetry and monologues, presented in a series of fragments that were written at various times in Thibeault's life. The narrative concerns Thibeault's origins in Trois-Rivières, where she grew up as the daughter of a mailman, and her journey to the Canadian West; it is set between Trois-Rivières, Montreal, Banff, and Edmonton, where Thibeault currently lives.

Thibeault reflects on her family's relationship with wood and paper, including relatives who worked in the logging industry in Mauricie or as carpenters, her father's career as a letter carrier, and her own vocation as a writer who lays down ideas on paper. She contrasts her own nomadic tendencies with those of her father, who remained strongly attached to Trois-Rivières and delivered mail along the same routes day after day. She also describes the doubts that led her to make a brief return to Quebec after nearly two decades of living in Edmonton, a trip that was marked by an illness that afflicted her father.

It is expected to be the first work in a trilogy.

== Performance and publication history ==
In 2017, extracts of La fille du facteur were first presented as part of a series of public readings, À voix haute, at Edmonton's Francophone theater company, L'Unithéâtre. As the work evolved, Thibeault sought feedback from audience members and from L'Unithéâtre's artistic director, Brian Dooley. In 2019, she presented the piece as part of the Zones théâtrales exhibition in Ottawa, and in early 2020 she planned a tour of Albertan cities.

In 2023, La fille du facteur was published as a book by Les Éditions du Blé; it does not yet have an official English translation. At the 2024 Alberta Literary Awards, the book was awarded the Gwen Pharis Ringwood Award for Drama, becoming the first French-language work to win the prize.
