= Gabrielle Graham =

Canadian actress

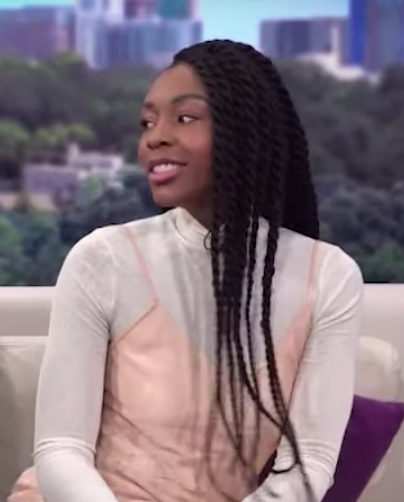
- Gabrielle Graham in 2020
- Education: York University
- Occupation: Actress
- Years active: 2017–present

Gabrielle Graham is a Canadian actress. She first appeared in the Amazon Prime series The Expanse (2017). Later that year, she went on to star as recurring role Fatima Gossa in the Netflix series 21 Thunder. She continued appearing in various films and television series, most notably in films as Parker in On the Basis of Sex (2018) and as Tabitha in In the Shadow of the Moon (2019).

== Career ==
She had her breakthrough starring as main role Nia in the series Twenties (2020–2021). That same year she also appeared in the sci-fi horror film Possessor (2020) as Holly, where she opened the film, and for which her performance was critically praised.

She attended York University for acting and graduated in 2015.

She received a Canadian Screen Award nomination for Best Performance in a Television Film or Miniseries at the 11th Canadian Screen Awards in 2023 for her performance in the film Swindler Seduction.

== Filmography ==
=== Film ===
Year	Title	Role	Notes
2017	Gatekeeper	Karina	Short
2017	Darken	Karisse	
2017	Christmas Wedding Planner	Clumsy Bridesmaid	TV movie
2018	Clara	Café Server	
2018	On the Basis of Sex	Parker	
2018	Hometown Holiday	Michelle	TV movie
2019	Long Shot	Franci	
2019	Lucky Day	Sabine	
2019	In the Shadow of the Moon	Tabitha	
2020	Possessor	Holly Bergman	
2020	Tempted by Danger	Nicole Brooks	TV movie
2020	Marry Me This Christmas	Angela Reed	TV movie
2022	Swindler Seduction	Louisa	TV movie
2022	Relax, I'm from the Future	Holly	

=== Television ===
Year	Title	Role	Notes
2017	The Expanse	Belter Prostitute	Episode: "Doors & Corners"
2017	21 Thunder	Fatima Gossa	Recurring cast
2017	Kim's Convenience	Sage	Episode: "Resting Place"
2018	The Bold Type	Daniella	Episode: "The Domino Effect"
2018	Frankie Drake Mysteries	Miss Parsons	Episode: "Radio Daze"
2020	The Wedding Planners	Jennifer	Episode: "Champagne Dreams, Beer Budget"
2020-21	Twenties	Nia	Main cast
2024	The Madness	Kallie	Main cast
