= Peepers (film) =

- Directed by: Seth W. Owen
- Written by: Seth W. Owen; Daniel Perlmutter; Mark Slutsky
- Produced by: Andi State
- Starring: Joe Cobden; Janine Theriault; Paul Spence; Howard Bilerman; Ricky Mabe; Dan Beirne; Tyrone Benskin; Jessica Paré
- Cinematography: Bobby Shore
- Edited by: Jared Curtis
- Production company: Encore Entertainment
- Distributed by: eOne
- Release date: February 2010 (Cinequest)
- Running time: 83 min
- Country: Canada
- Language: English

Peepers is a Canadian comedy film, directed by Seth W. Owen and released in 2010. The film centres on a group of voyeurs who stage rooftop parties to peep at women disrobing in their apartments, whose equilibrium is upended when an academic starts observing them for her own scholarly research.

Owen co-wrote the film with Daniel Perlmutter and Mark Slutsky.

== Cast ==
- Joe Cobden as Steve Sherman
- Janine Theriault as Annette Fulvish
- Paul Spence as Peter
- Howard Bilerman as Neal
- Ricky Mabe as Bobby
- Dan Beirne as Stu
- Tyrone Benskin as Helman
- Jessica Paré as Helen

== Distribution ==
The film premiered at the Cinequest Film & Creativity Festival in 2010, and had several other film festival screenings that year, but never made it into commercial theatrical release. It was later released on DVD.

== Awards ==
The film received five Canadian Comedy Award nominations at the 12th Canadian Comedy Awards in 2011, for Best Film, Best Direction (Owen), Best Writing (Owen, Perlmutter, Slutsky), Best Male Performance in a Film (Cobden) and Best Female Performance in a Film (Theriault).
