= The Fruit Hunters =

2012 film by Yung Chang

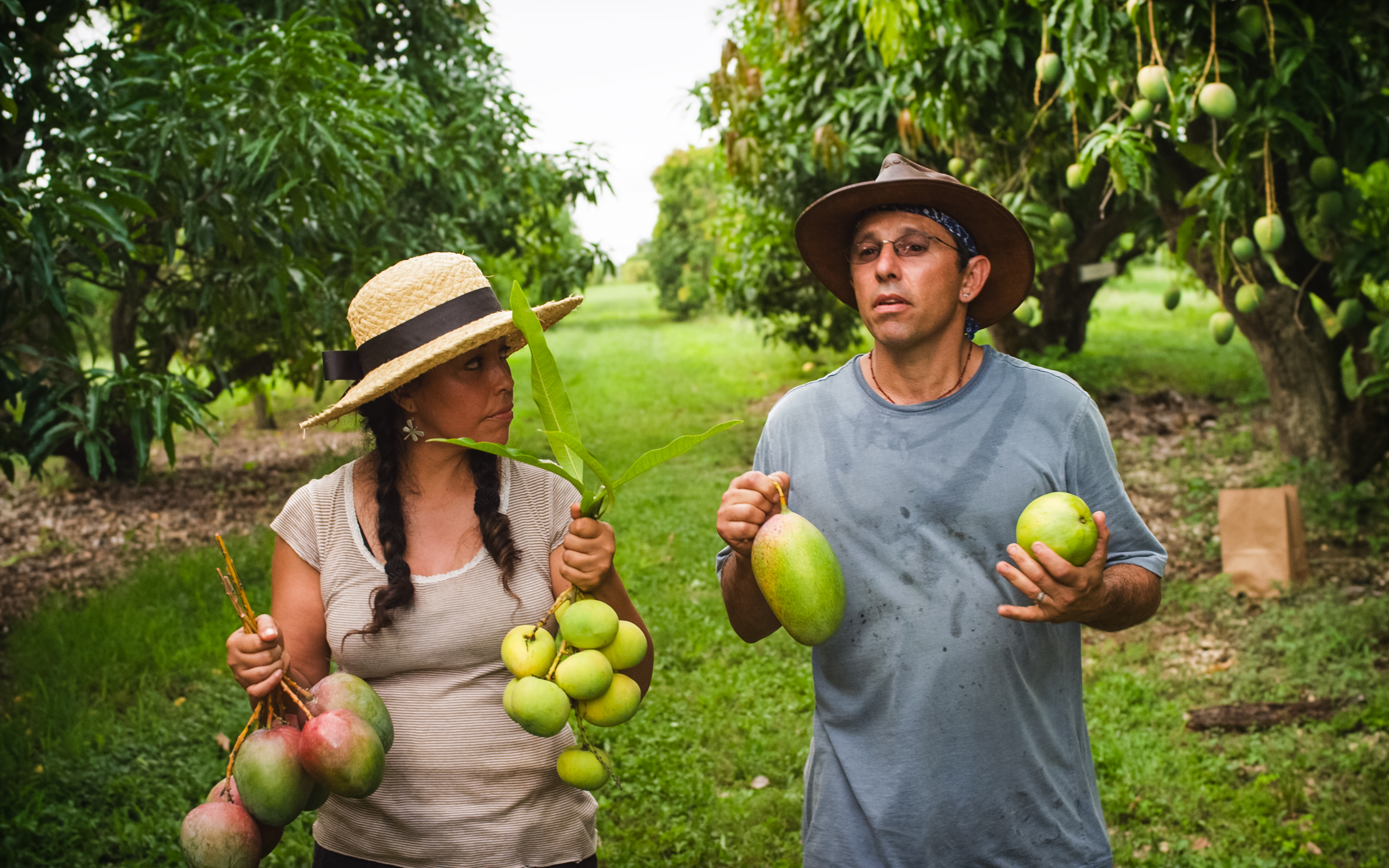

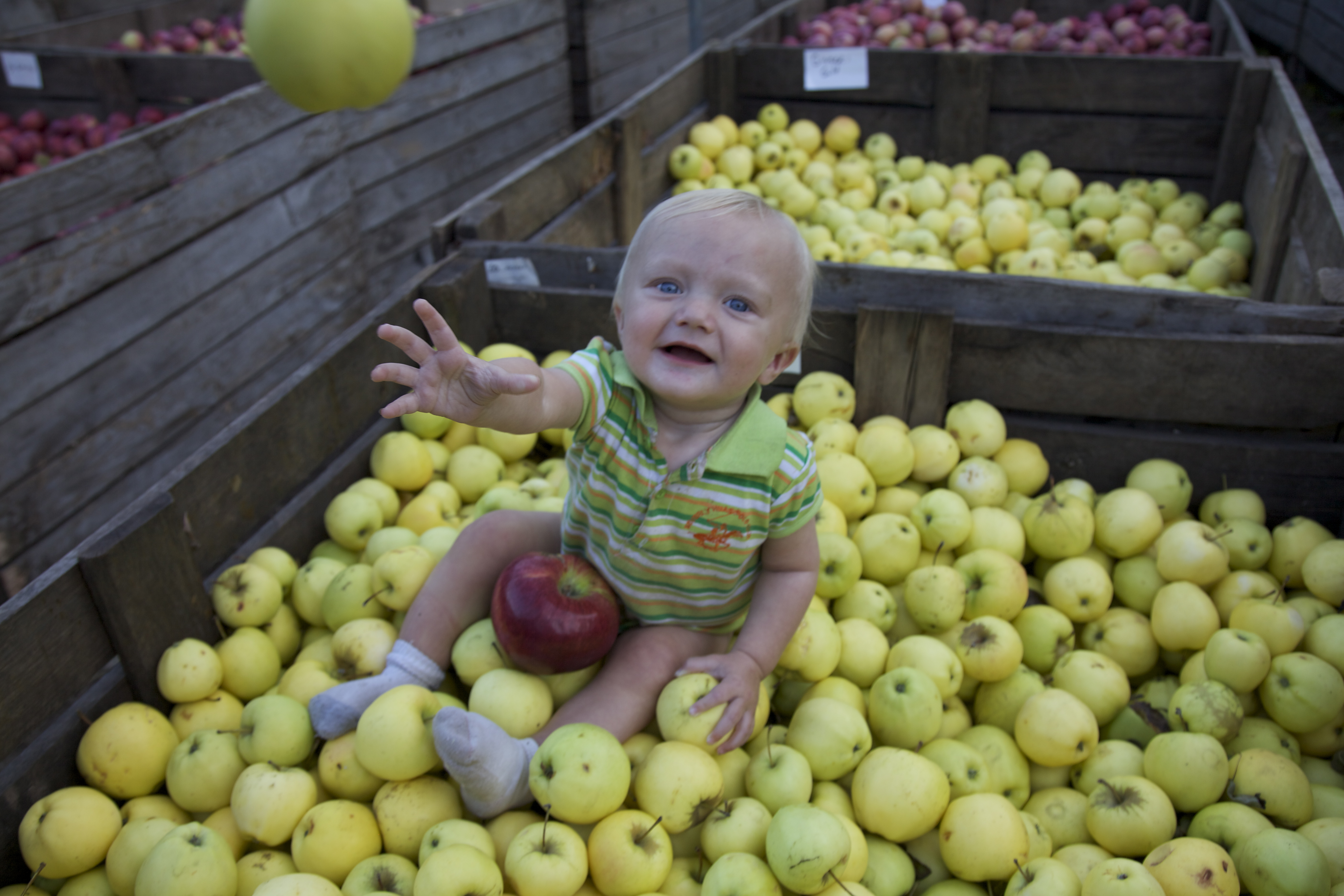

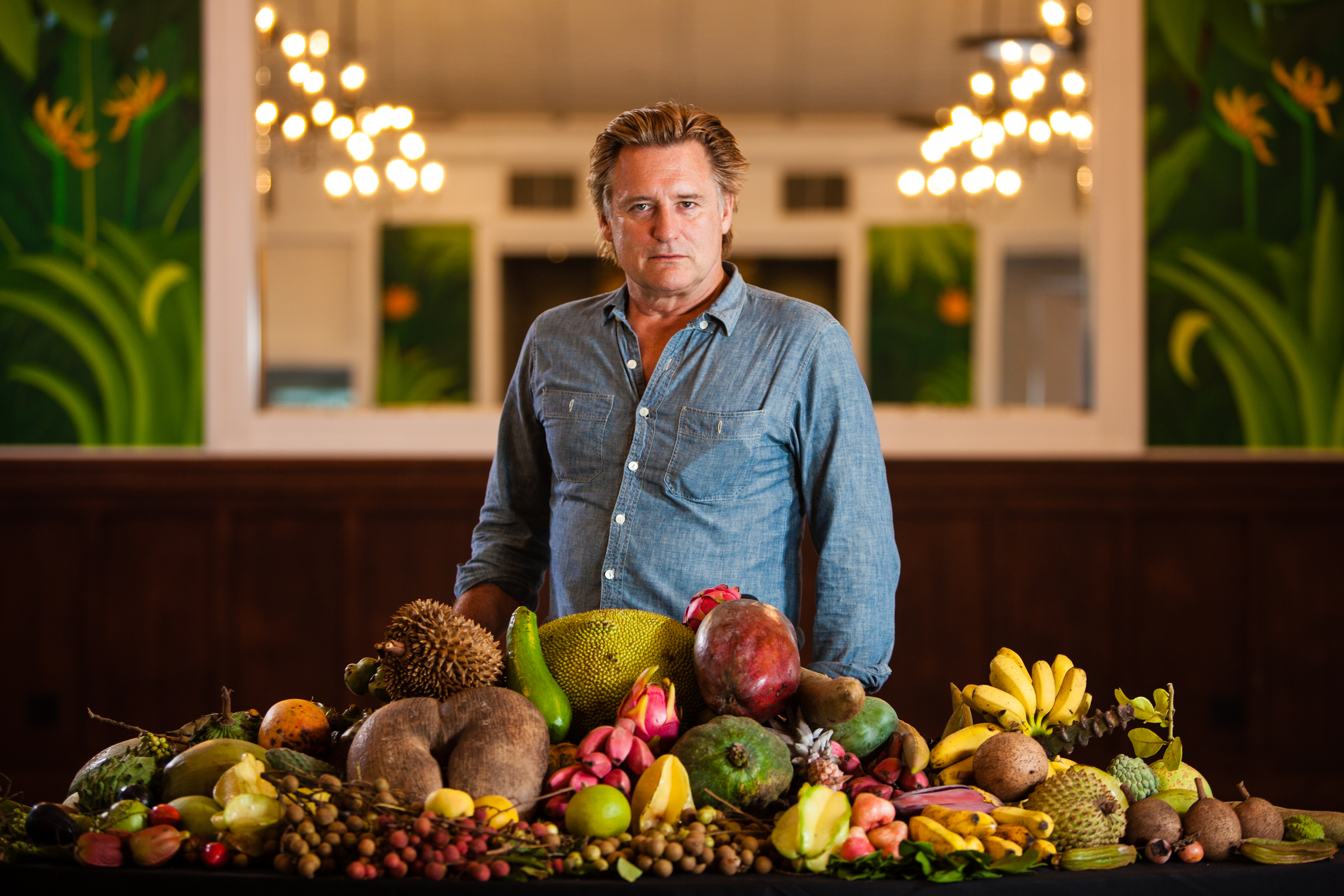
Bill Pullman

The Fruit Hunters is a 2012 feature documentary film about exotic fruit cultivators and preservationists. It is directed by Yung Chang and co-written by Chang and Mark Slutsky, and inspired by Adam Leith Gollner's 2008 book of the same name.

In addition to documentary sequences, the film also uses CGI animation, models and performers to stage real and imagined moments in the history of fruit.

== Film subjects ==
Subjects in the film include actor Bill Pullman, who was not featured in Gollner's book. The filmmakers became aware of his interest in fruit thanks to a 2009 New York Times profile. The film follows Pullman's efforts to develop a communal orchard near his Hollywood Hills residence.

Two staff members of Fairchild Tropical Botanic Garden are shown exploring jungles in Asia and South America in search of plants to graft and preserve.

The Fruit Hunters also features a Honduran scientist trying to find an alternative to the Cavendish banana, an Italian cultivator who studies Renaissance paintings to identify new varieties, and an indigenous guide in Borneo.

== Development and production ==
The idea for The Fruit Hunters was first pitched at a forum at Hot Docs, utilizing footage with Bill Pullman. The National Film Board of Canada and EyeSteelFilm agreed to co-produce the film, which also has funding from the Canadian Broadcasting Corporation, Telefilm Canada and SODEC.

Chang, Slutsky and Gollner were friends before working on the film, having once lived in the same building in Montreal.

== Reception ==
On review aggregator website Rotten Tomatoes the film has an approval rating of 100% based on 7 critics, with an average rating of 6.8/10.

Stephanie Merry of The Washington Post said that "Hearing the personalities describe the transcendent tastes of different fruits has me wanting to hop the next plane to Hawaii just to taste a water apple".

According to Daphne Howland of The Village Voice, the film have "many haphazard details and much talk of obsession", while "the lush work by cinematographer Mark Ellam is something of a guide, sensuous and outstanding". John DeFore of The Hollywood Reporter called the documentary "Delicious".
