= Colton Haynes =

American actor and model (born 1988)

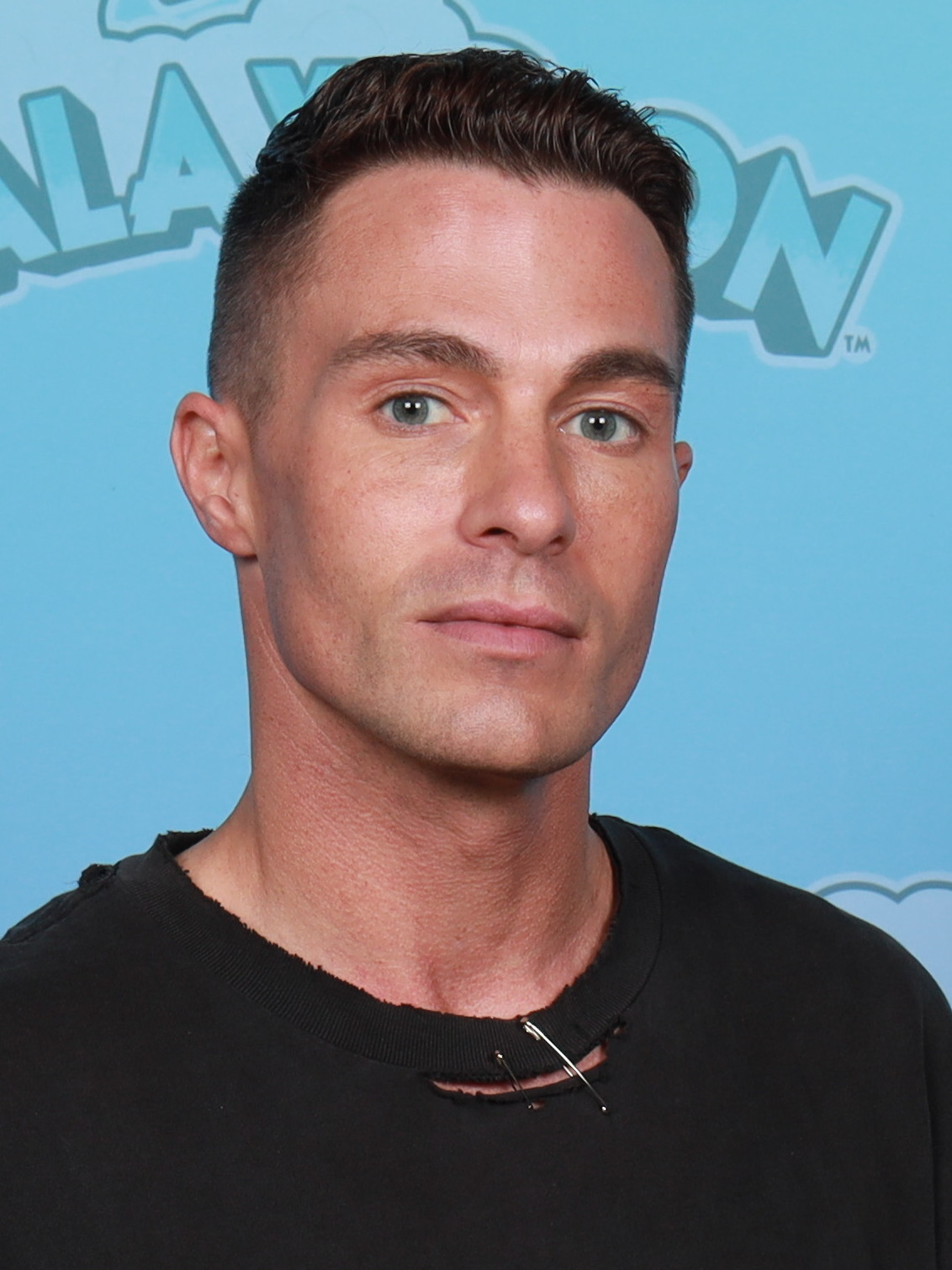
- Haynes at 2025
- Born: Colton Lee Haynes; July 13, 1988 (age 38): Wichita, Kansas or; Andale, Kansas, U.S.; (sources differ)
- Occupations: Actor, model
- Years active: 2007–present
- Spouse: Jeff Leatham (m. 2017; div. 2019)

Colton Lee Haynes (born July 13, 1988) is an American actor and model. He is known for his starring role as Jackson Whittemore in the MTV supernatural drama series Teen Wolf and as Roy Harper / Arsenal in the CW superhero television series Arrow.

== Early life ==
Colton Lee Haynes was born either in Wichita, Kansas, or Andale, Kansas, a town of 900 people. (Note: Sources differ; Andale has no hospital.) He has described his parents as "free-spirited hippies". Haynes has five siblings. The children grew up on a farm in Andale and also lived in Arkansas, New Mexico, Texas and Florida. Haynes attended Navarre High School in Florida and Andale High School in Kansas, graduating from Samuel Clemens High School in Schertz, Texas. Haynes's parents were divorced; his father was married seven times.

Haynes came out as gay at the age of 14 and has said that he experienced bullying in school due to his sexuality. He has also stated that he ran away from home for a time due to his mother's negative reactions. Haynes's father ultimately died by suicide during his teen years; reportedly, Haynes was informed that his being gay is what drove his father to take his own life.

== Career ==
Haynes began his career as a model at the age of fifteen in New York City, New York. He subsequently appeared in a Bruce Weber photo shoot for Abercrombie & Fitch. Afterward, Haynes began modeling in campaigns for Kira Plastinina, J. C. Penney, and Ralph Lauren. In 2008, Haynes continued modeling in campaigns such as Verizon and also appeared in numerous magazine editorials such as Teen Vogue and Arena.

He made an uncredited appearance in the 2007 blockbuster Transformers. He also appeared on CSI: Miami and The Hills. In addition to guest roles, in April 2007, Haynes acted in My Chemical Romance's music video for their single "I Don't Love You", directed by Marc Webb. Later that year, Haynes auditioned for the role of Edward Cullen in the film version of Stephenie Meyer's young adult novel Twilight, but Robert Pattinson was cast instead.

In 2008, he appeared on the television series Privileged and Pushing Daisies. He played Scott Holland in the Hallmark Channel film Always and Forever. Filming began in December 2008, and the film was released to television on October 24, 2009. It was announced in 2009 that Haynes had won the role of Shane in the Showtime series Look, based on the 2007 film of the same name. "I play a 17-year-old asshole. The show is very racy with lots of nudity, sex, drugs and real-life experiences that will shock audiences," Haynes said in an interview. The show premiered in 2010 and was cancelled after its first season. In March 2010, filming began for the ABC television series The Gates, in which Haynes portrays Brett Crezski, a jock who begins to turn into a werewolf. The series premiered on June 20, 2010. The short-lived show was cancelled after its first season.

Haynes landed the role of Jackson Whittemore in the 2011 MTV series Teen Wolf, based on the 1985 film of the same name. In October 2012, Haynes revealed he was leaving the show after two seasons, stating "I'm sad that this chapter has ended, but excited for a new one to begin." Beginning in 2012, he was a recurring member on The CW's Arrow, playing Roy Harper, a street thug who idolizes the Arrow and later becomes his protégé, Arsenal. Haynes was upgraded to series regular status on Arrow for season two. Haynes left the series at the end of season three, but made a guest appearance in the season four episode "Unchained".

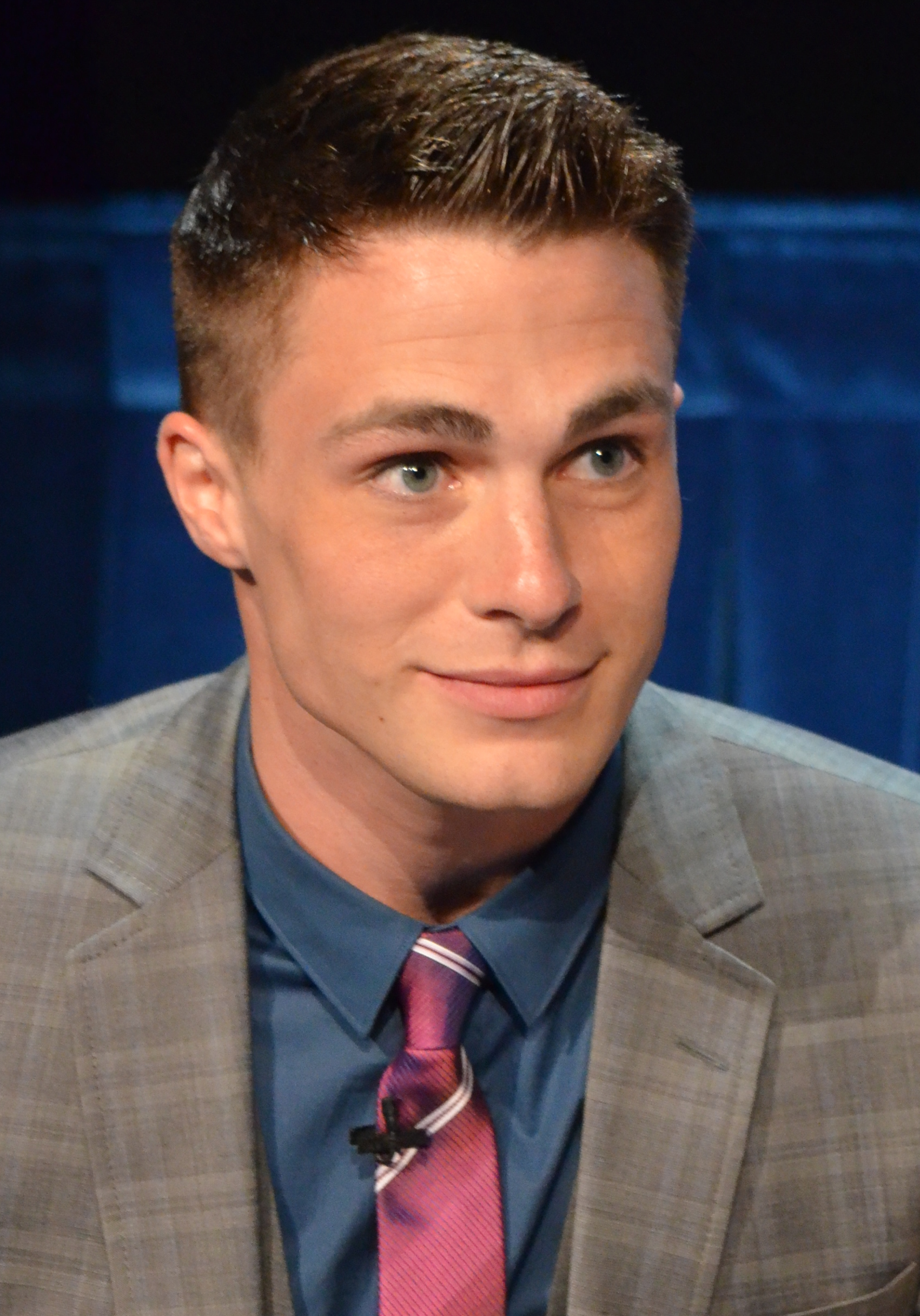
Haynes at the 2012 PaleyFest

In September 2012, he appeared in Leona Lewis's music video "Trouble", playing the part of her boyfriend. In July 2013, he starred in Victoria Justice's music video "Gold". Haynes began foraying further into the music industry that same year by covering a song, "19 You+Me", with New Heights, before releasing a single with Travis-Atreo called "Baby It's Christmas". In December 2014, he also made a cameo appearance in Andy Grammer's music video "Honey, I'm Good".

In 2014, Haynes returned to his modeling roots by participating in Abercrombie & Fitch's "Making of a Star" campaign.

Haynes' first credited feature film role was in the 2015 film San Andreas. He followed San Andreas with a role in the comedy Rough Night, released in mid-2017. Haynes featured in the 2018 film Bigger as Jack LaLanne, reuniting with Teen Wolf co-star Tyler Hoechlin. In June 2017, Haynes joined the cast of American Horror Story: Cult. Later that year, Haynes rejoined Arrow, reprising his role as Roy Harper in the sixth season of the show in a guest capacity. In April 2018, it was announced that Haynes had signed to return as a series regular on the seventh season of Arrow. In August 2019, he confirmed he would not return as a regular for Arrow's eighth and final season, but added that Roy is "never gone for too long". Two months later, it was announced that Haynes would appear in a recurring role in the final season.

In 2022, Haynes released a memoir, Miss Memory Lane. The book debuted at number sixteen on the Publishers Weekly Bestseller List selling 3,542 units.

In September 2021, it was announced that a revival film for Teen Wolf had been ordered by Paramount+. The majority of the original cast members, including Haynes, were set to reprise their roles. The film was released on January 26, 2023.

== Personal life ==
Haynes has dealt with anxiety all his life. In January 2016, after years of public speculation concerning his "secret gay past", an off-the-cuff response he made on Tumblr—regarding a comment on photos that appeared in gay youth magazine XY (a decade prior)—was taken by many media outlets as a confirmation of his coming out. Not yet ready to speak openly about his sexuality, the renewed attention led Haynes to seek treatment for anxiety for a period of three months. He later publicly came out as gay in an interview in Entertainment Weekly in May 2016, revealing that he had concealed his sexuality on the advice of entertainment industry insiders who said that being open about it would hinder his career.

Haynes and celebrity florist Jeff Leatham became engaged on March 11, 2017. They were married on October 27, 2017. In May 2018, Haynes filed for divorce from Leatham, but the pair reconciled before their first wedding anniversary. However, in August 2019, they reached a divorce settlement.

Haynes' mother, Dana, died as a result of cirrhosis of the liver in March 2018. His sister died in April 2020 after a long battle against cancer.

In 2018, Haynes was hospitalized from an overdose of a mixture of Xanax and tequila. In March 2019, Haynes, having achieved sobriety, spoke publicly about his experiences with alcoholism and addiction, stating: "In ten years, there were maybe 25 days I didn't drink. I remember when I started, it was a couple glasses of wine, and it regressed into really dark times." He recounted going through a treatment program that lasted for four months to address his dependency.

== Filmography ==
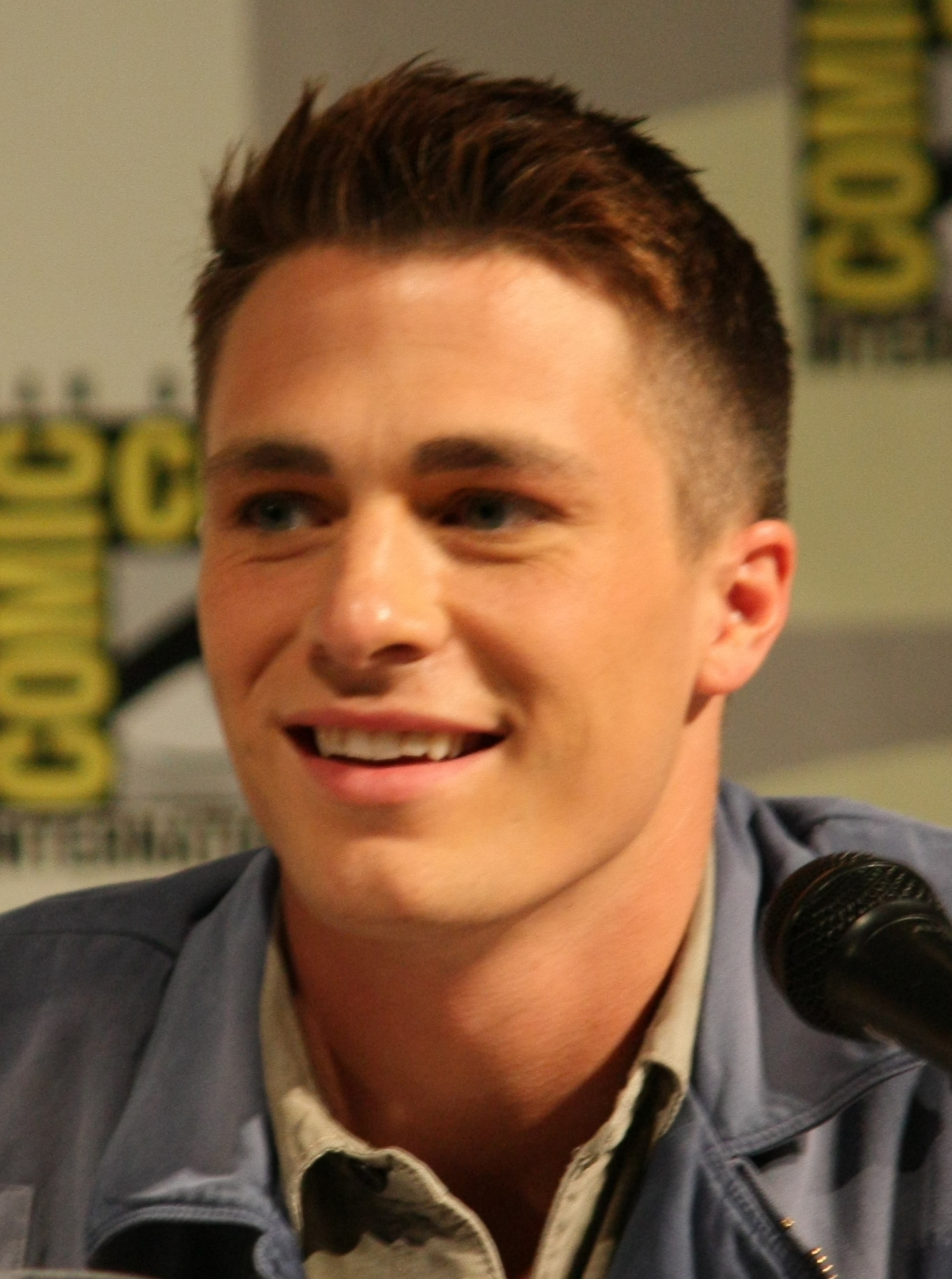
Haynes at San Diego Comic-Con, 2012

=== Film ===
Year	Title	Role	Notes
2007	Transformers	Cafe Kid	Uncredited
2015	San Andreas	Joby O'Leary	
2017	Rough Night	Scotty	
2018	Bigger	Jack LaLanne	
2021	Triumph	Jeff	
2023	Teen Wolf: The Movie	Jackson Whittemore	
2024	Love… Reconsidered	Scott	

=== Television ===
Year	Title	Role	Notes
2007	CSI: Miami	Brandon Fox	Episode: "Bang, Bang, Your Debt"
2008	Privileged	Alexander	Episode: "All About Friends and Family"
2008	Pushing Daisies	Ares Kostopolous	Episode: "Frescorts"
2009	Always & Forever	Scott Holland	Television film
2009	Melrose Place	Jessie Roberts	Episode: "Gower"
2010	The Gates	Brett Crezski	Main role
2010	Look: The Series	Shane	Main role
2011–2012; 2017	Teen Wolf	Jackson Whittemore	Main role (seasons 1–2); Guest role (season 6)
2011	The Nine Lives of Chloe King	Kai	Episode: "Dogs of War"
2013–2016; 2018–2020	Arrow	Roy Harper / Arsenal	Main role (seasons 2–3, 7); recurring role (seasons 1 & 8); guest role (seasons 4 & 6)
2016	The Grinder	Luke Grinder	Guest role; 2 episodes
2016	Scream Queens	Tyler	Guest role; 2 episodes
2017	American Horror Story: Cult	Jack Samuels	Recurring role
2022	Dollface	Lucas	Episode: "Homecoming Queen"
2022	Swindler Seduction	Steve/Mitch Johnson	TV film

=== Video games ===
Year	Title	Role	Notes
2016	Marvel Avengers Academy	Thor (voice)	

=== Music videos ===
Year	Title	Artist	Role	Notes
2007	"I Don't Love You"	My Chemical Romance	Lover	
2012	"Trouble"	Leona Lewis	Love interest	
2013	"Gold"	Victoria Justice	Love Interest	
2014	"Honey, I'm Good."	Andy Grammer	Guest star	
2021	"Industry Baby"	Lil Nas X	Head of security	
2023	"In Your Love"	Tyler Childers	Jasper	

== Awards and nominations ==
Award	Year	Category	Nominated work	Result	Ref.
HRC Seattle Gala and Auction	2016	HRC Visibility Award	Himself	Honored	
The Queerties	2017	Closet Door Bustdown	Himself	Won	
The Queerties	2019	Favorite Follow	Himself	Nominated	
