= Mark Slutsky =

Canadian filmmaker

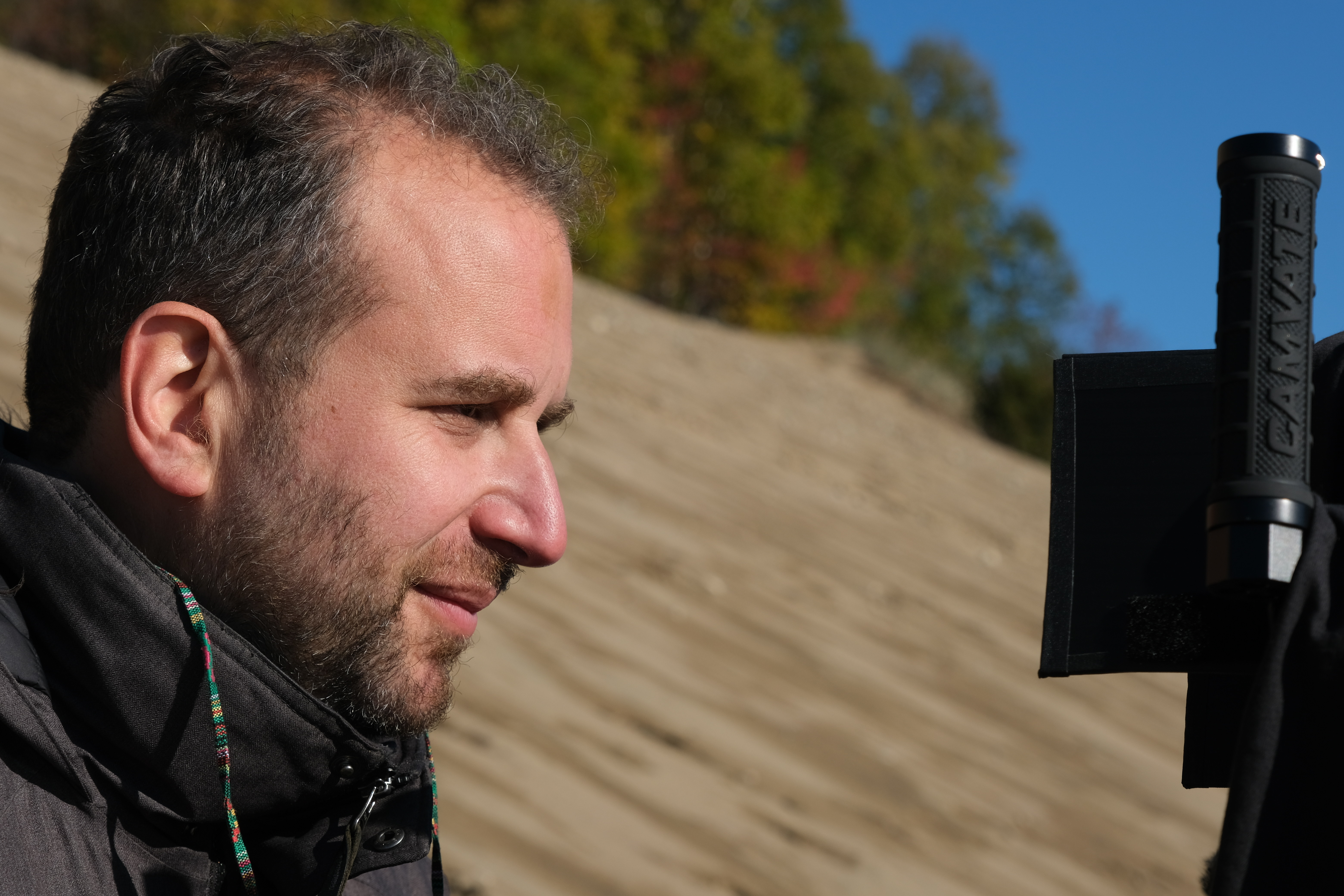
- Occupations: Film director, screenwriter
- Years active: 2000s–present

Mark Slutsky is a Canadian filmmaker, screenwriter, and video game director from Montreal, Quebec. He is best known for the 2022 film You Can Live Forever, which he co-directed and co-wrote with Sarah Watts.

== Career ==
Previously a film critic for the Montreal Mirror, he made his debut as a filmmaker as codirector with Seth W. Owen and Daniel Perlmutter of the comedy mockumentary film The Recommendations in 2005. The three subsequently collaborated on the screenplay for the 2010 film Peepers, which was directed by Owen.

He subsequently wrote and directed a number of short films, and cowrote Yung Chang's documentary film The Fruit Hunters, before collaborating with Watts on You Can Live Forever, which premiered at the Tribeca Film Festival in 2022.

== Filmography ==
- The Recommendations - 2005, codirector with Seth W. Owen and Daniel Perlmutter
- Peepers - 2010, cowriter with Seth W. Owen and Daniel Perlmutter
- The Decelerators - 2012, director and writer
- Sorry, Rabbi - 2012, director and writer
- The Fruit Hunters - 2012, cowriter with Yung Chang
- Never Happened - 2015, director and writer
- Final Offer - 2018, director and writer
- You Can Live Forever - 2022, codirector with Sarah Watts

== Awards ==
| Award | Year | Category | Work | Result | Ref. |
|---|---|---|---|---|---|
| Canadian Comedy Awards | 2011 | Best Writing in a Film | Peepers with Seth W. Owen, Daniel Perlmutter | Nominated | |
| Canadian Screen Awards | 2020 | Best Video Game Narrative | We Happy Few: Lightbearer with Alex Epstein, Lisa Hunter | Nominated | |
| Canadian Screen Awards | 2021 | Best Video Game Narrative | We Happy Few: We All Fall Down with Alex Epstein, Lisa Hunter | Won | |
| Directors Guild of Canada | 2022 | DGC Award for Best Direction in a Feature Film | You Can Live Forever with Sarah Watts | Nominated | |
