= Catalyst Theatre =

Canadian theatre company

Coordinates: 53°31′16″N 113°29′40″W

- Formation: 1977
- Type: Theatre group
- Purpose: Original works
- Location(s): 9828 101 Avenue NW Edmonton, Alberta T5J 3C6
- Artistic director: Jonathan Christenson
- Website: www.catalysttheatre.ca

Catalyst Theatre is a theatre company based in Edmonton, Alberta. Founded in 1977 as a social action theatre, it was taken over by Artistic Co-Directors Jonathan Christenson and Joey Tremblay in 1996. Since 2002, Catalyst Theatre has been developing new work under the creative leadership of Artistic Director Jonathan Christenson in collaboration with Resident Designer Bretta Gerecke. Catalyst Theatre's artistic team has created original productions that have toured the United Kingdom, Canada, Australia and the United States.

== History ==
Between 1978 and 1996, Catalyst Theatre’s offices were located in the Macleod Building in downtown Edmonton and later in the Garneau Community League on Edmonton’s southside. In 1996, Catalyst moved from the Garneau Community League to a derelict warehouse in Old Strathcona where they completed a renovation that included re-roofing, installing public washrooms, offices, lobby, studio and office space, dressing rooms, a green room and a performance space. The space was leased from the building’s owner, the Edmonton Jazz Society, which operates the Yardbird Suite, a performance venue at the north end of the same building.

In 2000, Catalyst raised the roof and removed the pillars, creating a 2400 SF black box theatre with 20-foot-high ceilings. From 2000 to 2015, the company developed and presented its productions in this space, as well as producing an annual international presenting series (“Blind Dates"). During this time, Catalyst also rented the theatre to the Edmonton International Fringe Festival each year as a Fringe Venue as well as renting to a variety of Edmonton-based theatre, music, and dance companies throughout the season.

In 2015, Catalyst became a resident company at the Citadel Theatre in downtown Edmonton and raised $1.2 million to renovate the Citadel’s Maclab Theatre and lobby and to build a suite of offices where they continue to be based.

The black box theatre created by Catalyst Theatre continues to be an important part of Edmonton’s inventory of live performance venues and has been home to Theatre Network (2015 to 2021) and Workshop West Theatre (2022 to the present).

Between 1997 and the present, Catalyst has been presented at such festivals as the London International Festival of Theatre (LIFT), Luminato (Toronto), The Edinburgh Fringe, Carrefour International de Théâtre (Québec), PuSh Festival (Vancouver), High Performance Rodeo (Calgary), and Magnetic North (Ottawa). They have performed at such theatres as the Barbican Theatre (London), New World Stages (NYC), the New Victory Theatre (NYC), the Liverpool Playhouse, The Traverse (Edinburgh), The Tron (Glasgow), The Pleasance (London), La Caserne (Quebec), The National Arts Centre (Ottawa), Canadian Stage (Toronto), The Grand (London, ON), Theatre Calgary, Vertigo Theatre (Calgary), ATP (Calgary), Persephone Theatre (Saskatoon), The Globe (Regina), The Eric Harvie Theatre (Banff Centre for the Arts), Vancouver Playhouse, The Arts Club (Vancouver), and The Cultch (Vancouver), as well as many other theatres across Canada, the UK, the United States and Australia.

== Productions ==
=== until the next breath (2020) ===
Conceived by Jonathan Christenson and Bretta Gerecke. Text and Music by Jonathan Christenson. Directed by Jonathan Christenson. Design by Bretta Gerecke. Choreography by Laura Krewski. Music Production and Sound Design by Matthew Skopyk.

=== The Invisible - Agents of Ungentlemanly Warfare (2019) ===
Book, lyrics and music by Jonathan Christenson. Directed by Jonathan Christenson. Production Design by Bretta Gerecke. Original Choreography by Laura Krewski. Music Production and Sound Design by Matthew Skopyk.

=== Fortune Falls (2016) ===
Co-Written by Jonathan Christenson & Beth Graham. Directed and composed by Jonathan Christenson. Lighting and set design by Kerem Centinel. Costumes by Megan Koshka. Music Production and Sound Design by Matthew Skopyk.

=== Songs for Sinners & Saints (2016) ===
A concert review of all previous works. Directed by Jonathan Christenson.

=== All Our Unworldly Possessions (2015) ===
Conceived by Jonathan Christenson and Bretta Gerecke. A season-long installation piece.

=== Vigilante (2015) ===
Book, music and lyrics by Jonathan Christenson. Directed by Jonathan Christenson. Choreographed by Laura Krewski. Set Design by Jonathan Christenson with James Robert Boudreau. Lighting Design by Beth Kates. Costume Design by Narda McCarroll. Music Production and by Matthew Skopyk. Sound Design by Wade Staples. This original rock musical follows the story of the Donnelly family, as they escaped their homeland of Ireland to the rough country-side of Ontario.

=== The Soul Collector (2013) ===
Book, music and lyrics by Jonathan Christenson. Directed by Jonathan Christenson. Choreographed by Marie Nychka. Production Design by Bretta Gerecke. Music Production by Matthew Skopyk. Sound Design by Wade Staples.

=== Whisper (2012) ===
Text by Jonathan Christenson and the Ensemble. Directed by Jonathan Christenson. Music by Jonathan Christenson with Matthew Skopyk. Production Design by Bretta Gerecke.Choreography by Laura Krewski. Sound Design by Matthew Skopyk. In 2012, Catalyst produced Whisper in association with Studio Theatre at the University of Alberta, which was performed by the school's BFA Acting class of 2012.

=== Hunchback (2011) ===
Book, music and lyrics by Jonathan Christenson, from Victor Hugo's Notre Dame de Paris. Directed by Jonathan Christenson. Production Design by Bretta Gerecke. Original Choreography by Laura Krewski. Music Production by Matthew Skopyk. Sound Design by Wade Staples.

=== Nevermore: The Imaginary Life and Mysterious Death of Edgar Allan Poe (2009) ===
Book, music and lyrics by Jonathan Christenson, from the works of Edgar Allan Poe. Directed by Jonathan Christenson. Production Design by Bretta Gerecke. Original Choreography by Laura Krewski. Music Production by Matthew Skopyk. Sound Design by Wade Staples. Nevermore had an 11-week Off-Broadway run at New World Stages from January 14, 2015 to March 29, 2015. On June 16, 2015, The Original Off-Broadway Cast Recording of Nevermore – The Imaginary Life and Mysterious Death of Edgar Allan Poe soundtrack was released by Broadway Records. This was Catalyst's first soundtrack album.

=== Frankenstein (2007) ===
Book, music and lyrics by Jonathan Christenson. Directed by Jonathan Christenson. Production Design by Bretta Gerecke. Original Choreography by Laura Krewski. Music Production by Matthew Skopyk. Sound Design by Wade Staples. From Mary Shelley's 1813 novel, Frankenstein.

=== Sticky Shoes (2005) ===
Created by Jonathan Christenson and Bretta Gerecke.

=== Love + Love (2004) ===
Created by Jonathan Christenson, Annie Dugan, Bretta Gerecke, and John Ullyatt.

=== Carmen Angel (2003) ===
Written by Joey Tremblay. Directed by Jonathan Christenson. Music composed by Jonathan Christenson. Production Design by Bretta Gerecke. Sound Design by Wade Staples.

=== Dream Life (2003) ===
Written by Chris Craddock. Directed by Jonathan Christenson. Music composed by Jonathan Christenson. Production Design by Jonathan Christenson.

=== The Blue Orphan (2001) ===
Written by Jonathan Christenson and Joey Tremblay. Directed by Jonathan Christenson. Music composed by Jonathan Christenson. Production Design by Bretta Gerecke. Sound Design by Wade Staples.

=== The House of Pootsie Plunket (1999) ===
Written and directed by Joey Tremblay and Jonathan Christenson. Sound Design by Jonathan Christenson. Production Design by Bretta Gerecke.

=== Songs for Sinners (1998) ===
Written and directed by Joey Tremblay and Jonathan Christenson. Music composed by Paul Morgan Donald, Jonathan Christenson, and Joey Tremblay. Production Design by Bretta Gerecke.

=== Abundance (1997) ===
Written and directed by Joey Tremblay, Jonathan Christenson, and company. Production Design by Bretta Gerecke.

=== Electra (1996) ===
Written and directed by Joey Tremblay and Jonathan Christenson. Music and Sound by Jonathan Christenson. Production Design by Bretta Gerecke.

=== Elephant Wake (1996) ===
Written by Joey Tremblay and Jonathan Christenson. Directed by Jonathan Christenson.

=== My Perfect Heaven (1996) ===
Written by Joey Tremblay and Jonathan Christenson. Music composed by Jonathan Christenson. Directed by Jonathan Christenson.

== Awards and nominations ==
LUCILLE LORTEL AWARDS
Year	Production	Category	Result
2015	Nevermore: The Imaginary Life and Mysterious Death of Edgar Allan Poe	Outstanding Musical - Jonathan Christenson	Nominated
2015	Nevermore: The Imaginary Life and Mysterious Death of Edgar Allan Poe	Outstanding Choreographer - Laura Krewski	Nominated
2015	Nevermore: The Imaginary Life and Mysterious Death of Edgar Allan Poe	Outstanding Costume Design - Bretta Gerecke	Nominated

ELIZABETH STERLING HAYNES AWARDS
Year	Production	Category	Result
2015	Elephant Wake	Outstanding Set Design - Bretta Gerecke	Nominated
2015	Elephant Wake	Outstanding Performance by an Actor in a Leading Role - Joey Tremblay	Won
2015	Elephant Wake	Outstanding Production of a Play - Catalyst Theatre	Nominated
2015	Vigilante	Timothy Ryan Award for Outstanding Production of a Musical - Catalyst Theatre	Nominated
2015	Vigilante	Outstanding Score of a Musical or Play - Jonathan Christenson	Nominated
2015	Vigilante	Outstanding Lighting Design - Beth Kates	Nominated
2015	Vigilante	Outstanding Performance by an Actress in a Leading Role - Jan Alexandra Smith	Nominated
2015	Vigilante	Outstanding New Play - Jonathan Christenson	Nominated
2015	Vigilante	Outstanding Costume Design - Narda McCarroll	Won
2015	Vigilante	Outstanding Musical Direction - Jonathan Christenson & Matthew Skopyk	Nominated
2020	The Invisible - Agents of Ungentlemanly Warfare	Outstanding Production of a Musical - Catalyst Theatre	Nominated
2020	The Invisible - Agents of Ungentlemanly Warfare	Outstanding Costume Design - Bretta Gerecke	Nominated
2020	The Invisible - Agents of Ungentlemanly Warfare	Outstanding Lighting Design - Bretta Gerecke	Nominated
2020	The Invisible - Agents of Ungentlemanly Warfare	Outstanding Multi Media Design - Bretta Gerecke	Nominated
2020	The Invisible - Agents of Ungentlemanly Warfare	Outstanding Score of a Play or Musical - Jonathan Christenson and Matthew Skopyk	Nominated
2013	The Soul Collector	Timothy Ryan Award for Outstanding Production of a Musical - Catalyst Theatre	Nominated
2013	The Soul Collector	Outstanding New Play - Jonathan Christenson	Nominated
2013	The Soul Collector	Outstanding Set Design - Bretta Gerecke	Nominated
2013	The Soul Collector	Outstanding Costume Design - Bretta Gerecke	Nominated
2013	The Soul Collector	Outstanding Score of a Play or Musical - Jonathan Christenson	Nominated
2013	The Soul Collector	Outstanding Musical Director - Jonathan Christenson	Nominated
2013	The Soul Collector	Outstanding Choreography or Fight Direction - Marie Nychka	Nominated
2020	The Invisible - Agents of Ungentlemanly Warfare	Outstanding Musical Direction - Jonathan Christenson and Matthew Skopyk	Nominated
2020	The Invisible - Agents of Ungentlemanly Warfare	Outstanding Choreography - Laura Krewski	Nominated
2017	Fortune Falls	Outstanding Lighting Design - Kerem Çetinel	Nominated
2011	Hunchback	The Timothy Ryan Award for Outstanding Production of a Musical - Catalyst Theatre	Nominated
2011	Hunchback	Outstanding Set Design - Bretta Gerecke	Nominated
2011	Hunchback	Outstanding Costume Design - Bretta Gerecke	Nominated
2011	Hunchback	Outstanding Lighting Design - Bretta Gerecke	Nominated
2011	Hunchback	Outstanding Score of a Play or Musical - Jonathan Christenson	Nominated
2011	Hunchback	Outstanding Musical Director - Don Horsburgh	Nominated
2009	Nevermore: The Imaginary Life and Mysterious Death of Edgar Allan Poe	Outstanding Production of a Musical - Catalyst Theatre	Won
2009	Nevermore: The Imaginary Life and Mysterious Death of Edgar Allan Poe	Outstanding New Play - Jonathan Christenson	Nominated
2009	Nevermore: The Imaginary Life and Mysterious Death of Edgar Allan Poe	Outstanding Director - Jonathan Christenson	Won
2009	Nevermore: The Imaginary Life and Mysterious Death of Edgar Allan Poe	Outstanding Set Design - Bretta Gerecke	Nominated
2009	Nevermore: The Imaginary Life and Mysterious Death of Edgar Allan Poe	Outstanding Costume Design - Bretta Gerecke	Won
2009	Nevermore: The Imaginary Life and Mysterious Death of Edgar Allan Poe	Outstanding Lighting Design - Bretta Gerecke	Won
2009	Nevermore: The Imaginary Life and Mysterious Death of Edgar Allan Poe	Outstanding Score of a Play or Musical - Jonathan Christenson & Wade Staples	Won
2009	Nevermore: The Imaginary Life and Mysterious Death of Edgar Allan Poe	Outstanding Musical Director - Jonathan Christenson	Won
2009	Nevermore: The Imaginary Life and Mysterious Death of Edgar Allan Poe	Outstanding Choreography or Fight Direction - Laura Krewski	Won
2007	Frankenstein	Outstanding Production of a Musical - Catalyst Theatre	Won
2007	Frankenstein	Outstanding New Play - Jonathan Christenson	Won
2007	Frankenstein	Outstanding Performance by an Actress in a Supporting Role - Nancy McAlear	Won
2007	Frankenstein	Outstanding Director - Jonathan Christenson	Nominated
2007	Frankenstein	Outstanding Set Design - Bretta Gerecke	Won
2007	Frankenstein	Outstanding Costume Design - Bretta Gerecke	Won
2007	Frankenstein	Outstanding Lighting Design - Bretta Gerecke	Won
2007	Frankenstein	Outstanding Score of a Play or Musical - Jonathan Christenson	Won
2007	Frankenstein	Outstanding Musical Director - Jonathan Christenson	Won
2007	Frankenstein	Outstanding Choreography or Fight Direction - Laura Krewski	Nominated
2005	faithless	Outstanding Production of a Play - Catalyst Theatre	Nominated
2005	faithless	Outstanding New Play - Chris Craddock & Steve Pirot	Nominated
2005	faithless	Outstanding Performance by an Actor in a Leading Role - Steve Pirot	Nominated
2005	faithless	Outstanding Director - Marianne Copithorne	Nominated
2005	faithless	Outstanding Lighting Designs - Bretta Gerecke	Won
2005	faithless	Outstanding Score of a Play or Musical - Aaron Macri	Nominated
2004	Dream Life	Outstanding New Play - Chris Craddock (Azimuth Theatre/Catalyst Theatre)	Nominated
2004	Dream Life	Outstanding Lighting Design - Bretta Gerecke (Azimuth Theatre/Catalyst Theatre)	Nominated
2004	Dream Life	Outstanding Score of a Play or Musical - Jonathan Christenson (Azimuth Theatre/Catalyst Theatre)	Nominated
2003	The Blue Orphan	Outstanding Production of a Musical - Catalyst Theatre	Nominated
2003	The Blue Orphan	Outstanding New Play - Jonathan Christenson & Joey Tremblay	Won
2003	The Blue Orphan	Outstanding Performance by an Actress in a Supporting Role - Beth Graham	Won
2003	The Blue Orphan	Outstanding Score of a Play or Musical - Jonathan Christenson	Won
2001	Fusion - Let There Be Light	Special Achievement Award: Special Theatrical Event - Catalyst Theatre	Won
1999	The House of Pootsie Plunket	Outstanding Costume Design - Bretta Gerecke	Nominated
1999	The House of Pootsie Plunket	Outstanding Lighting Design - Bretta Gerecke	Won
1998	Songs for Sinners	Outstanding Production of a Play - Catalyst Theatre	Nominated
1998	Songs for Sinners	Outstanding New Play - Jonathan Christenson & Joey Tremblay	Nominated
1998	Songs for Sinners	Outstanding Director - Jonathan Christenson & Joey Tremblay	Nominated
1998	Songs for Sinners	Outstanding Set Design - Bretta Gerecke	Nominated
1998	Songs for Sinners	Outstanding Costume Design - Bretta Gerecke	Nominated
1998	Songs for Sinners	Outstanding Lighting Design - Bretta Gerecke	Won
1998	Songs for Sinners	Outstanding Original Composition - Paul Morgan Donald with Jonathan Christenson & Joey Tremblay	Won
1997	My Perfect Heaven	Outstanding Fringe Production - Catalyst Theatre	Nominated
1997	My Perfect Heaven	Outstanding Fringe Performance - Joey Tremblay	Nominated
1997	My Perfect Heaven	Outstanding Fringe Director - Jonathan Christenson	Nominated
1997	My Perfect Heaven	Outstanding Fringe New Work - Jonathan Christenson & Joey Tremblay	Nominated

Betty Mitchell Awards
Year	Production	Category	Result
2019	The Invisible - Agents of Ungentlemanly Warfare	Outstanding Production	Nominated
2019	The Invisible - Agents of Ungentlemanly Warfare	Outstanding New Play - Jonathan Christenson	Won
2019	The Invisible - Agents of Ungentlemanly Warfare	Outstanding Performance by an Ensemble	Nominated
2019	The Invisible - Agents of Ungentlemanly Warfare	Outstanding Choreography - Laura Krewski	Nominated
2019	The Invisible - Agents of Ungentlemanly Warfare	Outstanding Composition - Jonathan Christenson	Nominated
2019	The Invisible - Agents of Ungentlemanly Warfare	Outstanding Musical Direction - Jonathan Christenson	Nominated
2019	The Invisible - Agents of Ungentlemanly Warfare	Outstanding Costume Design - Bretta Gerecke	Won
2019	The Invisible - Agents of Ungentlemanly Warfare	Outstanding Lighting Design - Bretta Gerecke	Won
2019	The Invisible - Agents of Ungentlemanly Warfare	Outstanding Projection of Video Design - Bretta Gerecke	Nominated
2016	Fortune Falls	Outstanding Lighting Design - Kerem Çetinel	Nominated
2016	Fortune Falls	Outstanding Sound Design or Composition - Jonathan Christenson	Nominated
2016	Fortune Falls	Outstanding Choreography or Fight Direction - Laura Krewski	Nominated
2011	Nevermore - The Imaginary Life & Mysterious Death of Edgar Allan Poe	Outstanding Lighting Design - Bretta Gerecke	Nominated
2011	Nevermore - The Imaginary Life & Mysterious Death of Edgar Allan Poe	Outstanding Costume Design - Bretta Gerecke	Won
2011	Nevermore - The Imaginary Life & Mysterious Death of Edgar Allan Poe	Outstanding Choreography or Fight Direction - Laura Krewski	Nominated
2011	Nevermore - The Imaginary Life & Mysterious Death of Edgar Allan Poe	Outstanding Musical Direction - Jonathan Christenson	Nominated
2011	Nevermore - The Imaginary Life & Mysterious Death of Edgar Allan Poe	Outstanding Performance By an Actor In a Comedy or Musical - Scott Shpley	Nominated
2011	Nevermore - The Imaginary Life & Mysterious Death of Edgar Allan Poe	Outstanding Production of a Musical - Catalyst Theatre	Won

Other National & International Awards
Year	Production	Award	Category	Result
2017	Vigilante	Capital Critics Awards - Ottawa	Best Production - Catalyst Theatre	Won
2017	Vigilante	Capital Critics Awards - Ottawa	Best Director - Jonathan Christenson	Nominated
2017	Vigilante	Capital Critics Awards - Ottawa	Best Set Design - Jonathan Christenson	Nominated
2017	Vigilante	Capital Critics Awards - Ottawa	Best Actress - Jan Alexandra Smith	Won
2017	Vigilante	SATAwards - Saskatoon	Outstanding Production - Catalyst Theatre	Won
2017	Vigilante	SATAwards - Saskatoon	Outstanding Direction - Jonathan Christenson	Nominated
2017	Vigilante	SATAwards - Saskatoon	Outstanding Musical Direction - Matthew Skopyk	Nominated
2017	Vigilante	SATAwards - Saskatoon	Outstanding Set Design - Jonathan Christenson	Won
2017	Vigilante	SATAwards - Saskatoon	Outstanding Costume Design - Narda McCarroll	Nominated
2017	Vigilante	SATAwards - Saskatoon	Outstanding Supporting Performance - Eric Morin	Nominated
2017	Vigilante	SATAwards - Saskatoon	Outstanding Leading Performance - Jan Alexandra Smith	Won
2017	Vigilante	SATAwards - Saskatoon	Outstanding Leading Performance - Carson Nattrass	Nominated
2017	Vigilante	SATAwards - Saskatoon	Outstanding Ensemble - Ensemble	Nominated
2016		Siminovitch Prize (Directing) - Canada	Jonathan Christenson	Shortlisted
2016		Mayor's Celebration of the Arts Awards - Edmonton	Ambassador of the Arts - Catalyst Theatre	Won
2012	Nevermore - The Imaginary Life & Mysterious Death of Edgar Allan Poe	SATAwards - Saskatoon	Achievement in Production - Catalyst Theatre	Won
2012	Nevermore - The Imaginary Life & Mysterious Death of Edgar Allan Poe	SATAwards - Saskatoon	Achievement in Set Design - Bretta Gerecke	Won
2012	Nevermore - The Imaginary Life & Mysterious Death of Edgar Allan Poe	SATAwards - Saskatoon	Achievement In Costume Design - Bretta Gerecke	Won
2012	Nevermore - The Imaginary Life & Mysterious Death of Edgar Allan Poe	SATAwards - Saskatoon	Outstanding Ensemble Cast - Ensemble	Nominated
2010	Nevermore - The Imaginary Life & Mysterious Death of Edgar Allan Poe	DORA Awards - Toronto	Outstanding Touring Production - Catalyst Theatre	Nominated
2002	The Blue Orphan	Stage Magazine - U.K.	Award for Acting Excellence - Ensemble	Nominated
1999	Elephant Wake	Alberta Book Award - Alberta	Best Published Play	Nominated
1999	The House of Pootsie Plunket	Herald Angel Award - Edinburgh, U.K.	Best Original Work - Jonathan Christenson and Joey Tremblay	Won
1999	The House of Pootsie Plunket	Fringe First Award - Edinburgh, U.K.	Best New Work - Jonathan Christenson and Joey Tremblay	Won
1999	The House of Pootsie Plunket	Stage Magazine - U.K	Award for Acting Excellence - Sian Williams	Nominated
1999	The House of Pootsie Plunket	Stage Magazine - Edinburgh, U.K	Total Theatre Award - Catalyst Theatre	Nominated
1998		Mayor's Awards - Edmonton	Best Emerging Artist - Bretta Gerecke	Won
1997	Elephant Wake	Fringe First Award - Edinburgh, U.K.	Best New Work, Fringe - Jonathan Christenson and Joey Tremblay	Won
1997	Elephant Wake	Stage Magazine - U.K.	Award for Acting Excellence - Joey Tremblay	Nominated
1997	Elephant Wake	Stage Magazine - U.K.	Total Theatre Award - Catalyst Theatre	Nominated
