= Bellevue (TV series) =

Canadian television crime drama series

- Genre: Crime drama
- Created by: Jane Maggs; Adrienne Mitchell
- Written by: Jane Maggs; Thomas Pound; Waneta Storms; Morwyn Brebner
- Directed by: Adrienne Mitchell; April Mullen; Kim Nguyen
- Starring: Anna Paquin; Shawn Doyle; Billy MacLellan; Sharon Taylor; Patrick Labbé; Vincent Leclerc; Janine Theriault; Victoria Sanchez; Joe Cobden; Allen Leech
- Composer: Mario Sévigny
- Country of origin: Canada
- Original language: English
- No. of seasons: 1
- No. of episodes: 8

Production
- Executive producers: Anna Paquin; Morwyn Brebner; Jane Maggs; Adrienne Mitchell; Michael Prupas; Janis Lundman; Jesse Prupas
- Producer: Diandra Yoselevitz
- Cinematography: Eric Cayla
- Editors: Teresa De Luca; Susan Shipton
- Running time: 60 minutes
- Production companies: Muse Entertainment; Back Alley Film Productions Ltd.

Original release
- Network: CBC Television
- Release: February 20 – April 10, 2017

Bellevue is a Canadian television crime drama series, it premiered on CBC Television on February 20, 2017. Created by Jane Maggs and Adrienne Mitchell, the series stars Anna Paquin as Annie Ryder, a police officer investigating the disappearance of a transgender teen while also dealing with the return of a mysterious person from her past.

The series is produced by Muse Entertainment and Back Alley Film Productions Ltd.

On May 24, 2017 it was announced that the series had been canceled by CBC, whereas a second season is in development, according to executive producer Adrienne Mitchell, but "production of a follow-up season is currently not moving forward."

The show began airing in the United States on WGN America on January 23, 2018, with On Demand service My5 acquiring the UK rights, allowing streaming from June 29, 2019.

== Cast ==
=== Main ===
- Anna Paquin as Annie Ryder, a detective who is investigating the disappearance and later murder of Jesse Sweetland
- Shawn Doyle as Peter Welland, Police Chief of Bellevue
- Billy MacLellan as Brady Holt, a detective
- Sharon Taylor as Virginia Panamick, a detective of First Nations heritage
- Patrick Labbé as Clarence Ryder, Annie's deceased father, a police detective who committed suicide when Annie was eight years old / Adam, Annie's brother
- Vincent Leclerc as Tom Edmonds, the coach of the junior hockey team
- Janine Theriault as Mayor Lily "Mother" Mansfield
- Victoria Sanchez as Maggie Sweetland, Jesse Sweetland's mother
- Joe Cobden as Father Jameson
- Allen Leech as Eddie Rowe, an unemployed miner and Annie's on and off again boyfriend and father of Daisy

=== Recurring ===
- Madison Ferguson as Daisy Ryder, Annie and Eddie's daughter
- Emelia Hellman as Bethany Mansfield, Mayor Mansfield's daughter
- Robert Naylor as Jacob Cowan, Bethany's boyfriend who is on Jesse's hockey team
- Sadie O'Neil as Jesse Sweetland, a hockey player who is a transgender teen, later found dead by Annie
- Cameron Roberts as Danny Debessage, Jesse's boyfriend
- Amber Goldfarb as Briana Holt, Brady's sister
- Patricia Summersett as Nikki Ryder, Annie's mother
- Andreas Apergis as Neil Driver, Sandy Driver's father
- Raphael Grosz-Harvey as Sid Oak
- Hebree Ahrys Larratt as 7–8 year old Annie
- Angela Magri as Sandy Driver, a teen who was murdered, Annie's father investigated her murder
- Susan Bain as Bev, a clerk in the police department
- Ryan Doherty as Max Bennett, a hockey player who is on Jesse's team
- Patrick Abellard as Jim

== Episodes ==
No.	Title	Directed by	Written by	Original release date	Prod. code
1	"Pilot"	Adrienne Mitchell	Jane Maggs	February 20, 2017	101
2	"He's Back"	Adrienne Mitchell	Jane Maggs	February 27, 2017	102
3	"The Guy with Fire in His Eyes"	April Mullen	Jane Maggs	March 6, 2017	103
4	"Hello Little Light"	April Mullen	Jane Maggs	March 13, 2017	104
5	"How Do I Remember?"	Kim Nguyen	Jane Maggs & Thomas Pound	March 20, 2017	105
6	"The Problem with the Truth"	Kim Nguyen	Waneta Storms	March 27, 2017	106
7	"The Man Behind the Curtain"	Adrienne Mitchell	Morwyn Brebner	April 3, 2017	107
8	"You Don't Understand Me at All"	Adrienne Mitchell	Jane Maggs	April 10, 2017	108
