= Relax, I'm from the Future =

2022 Canadian science fiction comedy film

- Directed by: Luke Higginson
- Written by: Luke Higginson
- Produced by: Tim Doiron; James van der Woerd
- Starring: Rhys Darby; Gabrielle Graham; Janine Theriault; Julian Richings
- Cinematography: Russ De Jong
- Edited by: Luke Higginson
- Music by: Bryan Bindon; Deanna H. Choi
- Production company: Wango Films
- Distributed by: Game Theory Films
- Release dates: July 20, 2022 (Fantasia); September 22, 2023
- Running time: 94 minutes
- Country: Canada
- Language: English

Relax, I'm from the Future is a 2022 Canadian sci-fi comedy film, written and directed by Luke Higginson and starring Rhys Darby and Gabrielle Graham.

== Synopsis ==
Casper is a time traveller from the future who arrives in the 2020s in an attempt to escape his boring and lonely life in the late 22nd century, intending to finance a comfortable and inconspicuous existence through knowledge of future sporting events and lottery results. He befriends Holly, a queer black woman whom he draws into his plans so that they can make quick money. Wanting to keep the flow of events in the future unaltered, he attempts to convince a suicidal artist, Percy, to kill himself by jumping off a building rather than by gunshot, as the artist's future fame hinges on that method of death. Percy is now unwilling to commit suicide, however. Before long the events draw the attention of Doris, another time traveller sent as a local enforcement agent to intercept any disruptors from the future trying to prevent a major cataclysmic event in the 2070s.

== Cast ==
- Rhys Darby as Casper
- Gabrielle Graham as Holly
- Julian Richings as Percy
- Janine Theriault as Doris
- Zachary Bennett as Chuck
- Amanda Barker as Librarian

== Production and distribution ==
The film is an expansion of Higginson's 2013 short film of the same name, which starred Zachary Bennett as the time traveller and Rick Roberts as Percy, a man whose preparations to commit suicide the traveller interrupts with the news that Percy isn't in the place where he's supposed to die. That scene is reenacted in the feature film, with Julian Richings in the role of Percy. Despite not playing the leading role in the feature film, Bennett still appears in a supporting role.

The film was shot in Hamilton, Ontario, in November and December 2021.

Relax, I'm from the Future premiered at the 2022 Fantasia Film Festival and was commercially released on September 22, 2023.

== Reception ==
On the review aggregator website Rotten Tomatoes, the film holds an 80% "Fresh" score, with an average rating of 6.8/10, based on 20 reviews.

== Awards ==
At the 2022 Fantasia Film Festival, the film received a bronze medal in the Best Canadian Film category.
