= Swindler Seduction =

- Genre: Drama
- Written by: Barbara Nance
- Directed by: Jonathan Wright
- Starring: Colton Haynes; Gabrielle Graham
- Theme music composer: Kristjan Bergey
- Countries of origin: Canada; United States
- Original language: English

Production
- Producers: Shane Boucher; Caitlin Delaney
- Cinematography: Jonathan Yapp
- Editor: Marc Roussel
- Running time: 110 minutes
- Production company: Muse Entertainment

Original release
- Network: Lifetime; CTV Life Channel
- Release: October 22, 2022

Swindler Seduction is a Canadian-American dramatic television film, directed by Jonathan Wright and released in 2022. The film stars Colton Haynes as Steve and Mitch Johnson, identical twin brothers who have turned to life as con artists, romancing women in order to swindle them out of their money, and Gabrielle Graham as Louisa, a woman who is falling victim to their scam.

The cast also includes Tanisha Thammavongsa, Megan Hutchings, Daniel Chae Jun, Yanna McIntosh and Dave Rose.

The film premiered October 22, 2022 on Lifetime, and was later broadcast in Canada by CTV Life Channel.

== Awards ==
Award	Date of ceremony	Category	Nominees	Result	Reference
Canadian Screen Awards	2023	Best TV Movie	Shane Boucher, Jonas Prupas, Caitlin Delaney, Jesse Prupas, Colton Haynes, Piers Vellacott, Sara Murray	Won	
Canadian Screen Awards	2023	Best Performance in a Television Film or Miniseries	Gabrielle Graham	Nominated	
Canadian Screen Music Awards	2023	Best Original Score for a Television Special	Kristjan Bergey	Won	
