= Jeff Leatham =

American designer (born 1971)

- Born: Jeffrey Brett Leatham; September 7, 1971 (age 54); Ogden, Utah, U.S.
- Occupation: Floral designer
- Spouse: Colton Haynes (m. 2017; div. 2019)

Jeffrey Brett Leatham (born September 7, 1971) is an American designer mainly associated with floral design. He was awarded the Chevalier Legion of Honour from the nation of France in 2014.

Jeff Leatham is the creative director of George V Hotel and the Four Seasons Hotels in Beverly Hills and Philadelphia. He also does the floral design for the Wynn and Encore Casinos in Las Vegas, Macau and Boston. His design collaborations in the world of fashion have included work with brands such as Louis Vuitton, Bulgari, Burberry and Cartier.

== Early life and education ==
Leatham was born and raised in Ogden, Utah, just 40 miles north of Salt Lake City. Both of his parents were schoolteachers in the local school district and his father was a principal at one point. He went to high school at Bonneville High School in Washington Terrace, Utah and attended Weber State University.

While in university Leatham began working at The Gap in downtown Ogden before eventually getting promoted to work as a store manager in a location in Salt Lake City before being transferred to another store in Los Angeles. While in Los Angeles he was discovered by a modeling agent and he left the United States to model in Milan and Paris for two years.

== Career ==
Leatham fell into floral design upon returning to Los Angeles after a stint modeling in Paris and got a job at the Four Seasons Hotel Beverly Hills. It is there where he says he learned his craft before transferring to the George V in Paris in 1994. He has since then designed crystal collections, a rug collection, candles, and has three books that have been published and sold around the world as well as a fragrance collection.

In 2009, he was asked to make a reality television program for TLC called Flowers Uncut that was shot in New York City while he still maintained his residence in Paris and simultaneously stayed on as the Creative Director of the Four Seasons. The show ran for one season.

In 2016, Leatham moved his main base of operations and biggest office to Los Angeles, California. There he was able to expand his business and his clientele includes many of the most famous people in the world: Oprah Winfrey, Hillary Clinton, Dolly Parton, the Dalai Lama, Cher, Sofía Vergara, Kanye West and the entire Kardashian family.

In Holland a flower was named after Leatham in 2017. It is called the Jeff Leatham Vanda and it is purple.

Leatham has had several books published. These books include Flowers by Jeff Leatham, Flowers by Design, and Jeff Leatham Visionary Floral Art and Design.

Leatham has also created a line of crystal glassware and home goods with Waterford Crystal.
