= Josée Thibeault =

Canadian writer and performer

Josée Thibeault is a Canadian writer, performer, theater director, and filmmaker. She was born in Trois-Rivières but has spent the majority of her artistic career in Edmonton.

== Personal life ==
Thibeault's father was a postman in Trois-Rivières. Thibeault first moved to Edmonton in 1994 and has spent most of her life there since. As of 2020, she lived with her partner in Old Strathcona.

== Career ==
In the late 1990s, Thibeault's play Ici-ailleurs was performed at the Festival de la dramaturgie des Prairies hosted by L'Unithéâtre in Edmonton. In 2005, Thibeault directed the National Film Board of Canada-produced documentary Le Mall about the people who frequent the Bonnie Doon Shopping Centre. She translated Sheldon Elter's play Métis Mutt into French for performance by L'Unithéâtre.

In 2017, Thibeault began presenting the first fragments of what would eventually become her theatrical work La fille du facteur, which concerns her upbringing in Quebec and her journey to Edmonton. The work was refined over the following years and eventually published in 2023. The following year, it became the first French-language work to win the Gwen Pharis Ringwood Award for Drama at the Alberta Literary Awards.

Thibeault's works have won numerous recognitions from the Regroupement artistique francophone de l'Alberta (RAFA). She has also served as vice president of the RAFA. She is a longtime member of the Franco-Albertan comedy group Collectif RiRe and hosted the podcast Le bocal during the COVID-19 pandemic.
