= Joel Keller =

Canadian actor

Joel Keller, sometimes credited as Joel S. Keller, is a Canadian film and television actor, best known for his regular roles as detective Ed Oosterhuis in the television series Blue Murder, and Bill in Men with Brooms.

He began his career as a teen actor, appearing in television series such as Road to Avonlea, E.N.G. and Catwalk in the early 1990s. In 1995 he also appeared in a controversial series of Labatt's beer commercials; despite being 23 years old at the time, his youthful appearance led to complaints that he was "too young" to be drinking or selling beer, ultimately resulting in the Canadian Radio-television and Telecommunications Commission ordering the ads to be pulled from broadcast even though one of the ads featured Keller showing his real-life identification to prove that he was of drinking age.

He became more widely known for his supporting role as Fletcher in the film The Hanging Garden, and later had supporting roles in film and television, including the films The Life Before This and The Art of Woo, before the premiere of Blue Murder in 2001.

Following the end of Blue Murder he had a recurring role as Jake Sharpe in Durham County, prior to the premiere of Men with Brooms in 2010. Keller and his other cast members in Men with Brooms received a Canadian Comedy Award nomination for Best Ensemble Performance in Television at the 12th Canadian Comedy Awards in 2011.

He played Karl Bélanger in the 2013 television film Jack, and has since had supporting appearances in the television series Saving Hope, Murdoch Mysteries, The Listener, Covert Affairs, Remedy, Rogue, Blood and Water, Heartland, Designated Survivor, Painkiller and Fellow Travelers, and the films The Sound and The Grizzlies.
