= Nevermore: The Imaginary Life and Mysterious Death of Edgar Allan Poe =

Musical by Jonathan Christenson

Nevermore: The Imaginary Life and Mysterious Death of Edgar Allan Poe is a musical that was written, composed, and directed by Jonathan Christenson and designed by Bretta Gerecke. It follows the life of Edgar Allan Poe and the internal and external struggles he faced which are depicted as inspiring his writings. In the play, Poe struggles with tragedies such as death, abandonment, addiction, poverty, and loss. The script contains many references to Poe's poems and short stories. The script fictionalizes true events that took place in his life while also incorporating his creative works and poems. It was originally produced at the Catalyst Theater in Edmonton, Alberta, for an 11-week production that then went on to be performed at theater festivals, theaters across Canada, to the Barbican Theater in London, and the New Victory Theater in New York City.

== Synopsis ==
Edgar Poe is born to husband and wife acting team Eliza and David Poe. His father disappears at night, leaving Eliza to raise the children on her own. (From The Beginning) The oldest child is William Henry Leonard Poe, an adventurous boy who dreams of finding a treasure with his brother Edgar and sister Rosalie. (The Family Poe pt.1) When Eliza Poe dies of tuberculosis, the three Poe children are split up from each other and sent off to new homes, as portrayed in the song, 'The Death of Eliza'.

Fanny Allan wishes to adopt all of the children, but John "Jock" Allan only allows one to be fostered: Edgar. Edgar fears Jock Allan, not just because the man is blind in one eye, but because Jock is bitter and disregarding towards the boy. Fanny Allan wins Edgar's love, as she brings tea and cinnamon toast to Edgar every morning, and presents him with a kitten. (The House of Allan pt.1)

Edgar becomes a prize student in language and especially poetry. Jock argues with Fanny that poetry will not get him anywhere. (Born Poet) Meanwhile, Edgar dreams to be a great poet like Israfel, the angel of music. (Israfel) Jock tells 13-year old Edgar that he must focus on his future. (Jock's Advice)

Fanny Allan is sent to an institute for the insane, and dies leaping off of the seventeenth floor, possibly in an attempt to "fly the coop". (The Death of Fanny Allan) After her death, Edgar is officially given the name Allan. But he starts to have dark thoughts, which Jock sees as him not accepting his gift. (Dream Within a Dream)

Edgar visits Fanny's grave, where he meets Sarah Elmira Royster, a strange girl who shares his love of morbid stories and the dark. They secretly become engaged, and plan to be married sometime in the future. (Edgar Meets Elmira)

Edgar goes to college, but has no money for books or food, and Jock refuses to send him anything. He writes letters to Elmira, all of which are hidden by her father. Thinking he has forgotten her, Elmira marries another man. (College Life) Edgar returns home without finishing his degree. Upon coming home, Edgar finds that Jock Allan has remarried and had a child. Jock and his new wife are unwelcoming to Edgar, and he moves to the streets. (The House of Allan pt.2)

Edgar briefly reunites with his siblings, but after Henry dies and Rosalie moves away, Edgar starts drinking like his father. The books he sells do not keep him stable and he writes Jock for help, fearing he may die if he doesn't get money for bills. Jock turns him away, and doesn't include him in his will. (The Family Poe pt.2)

Edgar secures a position through the publisher Rufus Griswold, and his poems began to appear in magazines. Edgar marries his cousin Virginia "Sissy" Clemm, and slowly gains fame for his writing (Taunting Ray of Hope), including "The Raven". Jealous of Poe, Griswold spreads a rumor about Edgar having an affair. Edgar loses his job and begins drinking once again, while Sissy dies of tuberculosis. (The Death of Sissy)

One night, Edgar is visited by his old love, the newly widowed Elmira Royster. She and Edgar rekindle their relationship and arrange to be married. (No More of This Madness) Edgar is confronted by his dark thoughts, who tell him "We are Your Nightmares." He goes to a bar and is then taken to hospital, where he dies.

== Original cast ==
The following is the original cast of Nevermore: The Imaginary Life and Mysterious Death of Edgar Allan Poe.

- Shannon Blanchet as Nancy Valentine, Elmira Royster, Mrs. Samuel Osgood, Miss Duval and Chorus
- Sheldon Elter as Henry Poe, Bill Burton, and Raven
- Beth Graham as Rosalie Poe, Fanny Allan, Ann Carter Lee, Virginia Clemm, Dresser, Society Lady and Chorus
- Ryan Parker as Alexander Shelton, Rufus Griswold, Metzengerstein's Horse, Corpse, Pallbearer, Chorus, The Imp
- Garett Ross as David Poe, Jock Allan, Mr. Bliss, Raven, Corpse
- Vanessa Sabourin as Eliza Poe, Muddy Clemm, Miss Duval, Society Lady, Chorus
- Scott Shpeley as Edgar Allan Poe

== Songs ==
ACT 1

1. Prologue – 5:14
2. From the Beginning – 9:22
3. The Family Poe (Part 1) – 4:02
4. The Death of Eliza – 9:40
5. Fanny Allan Loved the Theatre – 4:00
6. The House of Allan (Part 1) – 7:59
7. A Born Poet – 2:57
8. Israfel – 3:28
9. Jock Allan's Advice – 4:31
10. A Dream Within A Dream – 3:51
11. The Death of Fanny Allan – 5:00

ACT 2

1. Entr'acte – 3:05
2. Edgar Met Elmira – 9:54
3. College Life – 5:44
4. The House of Allan (Part 2) – 2:52
5. The Family Poe (Part 2) – 11:24
6. A Taunting Ray of Hope – 6:37
7. The Raven – 6:50
8. The Death of Sissy – 4:06
9. No More of This Madness – 5:05
10. We Are Your Nightmares – 4:59
11. Epilogue – 5:32

== Productions ==
- Keyano Theatre, Fort McMurray (Workshop) October 2008
- Catalyst Theatre May 2009
- National Arts Centre June 2009
- Luminato Theatre Festival June 2009
- Cultural Olympiad 2010/PuSh International Performing Arts Festival/Arts Club Theatre/The Cultch February 2010
- Catalyst Theatre February 2010
- LIFT/Barbican Centre, London, July 2010
- New Victory Theater, October 2010{Broadway World}
- Vertigo Theatre Centre, Calgary, January 2011
- Persephone Theatre, Saskatoon, October 2011
- Westbury Theatre, Edmonton, February 2014
- Vernon and District Performing Arts Centre, Vernon, March 2014
- Kay Meek Centre, West Vancouver, March 2014
- New World Stages, New York City, January 2015
- Doctuh Mistuh Productions, Austin Playhouse, Texas, October 2016
- Parkway South High School, Manchester, MO, October 2016
- Parkway South High School, St Louis Missouri, Missouri Thespian Conference, January 2017
- Strathcona High School, Edmonton, Alberta, April 2017
- Black Button Eyes Productions, The Edge Theatre, Chicago Premiere, January 2018
- Playhouse Merced, Merced, CA, January 2018 Cast Recording (Album)
- Terryville High School, Connecticut, March 2018
- Heritage High School, Lynchburg, Virginia, October 2018
- VTA's, Heritage High School, Norfolk, Virginia, October 2018
- Heritage High School, Lynchburg, Virginia, March 2019
- Tullahoma High School, Tullahoma, TN, April/May 2019
- Vertigo Theatre Centre, Calgary, May 6, 2023 - June 4, 2023
- Penrith Selective High School, Penrith, NSW, May 2024
- Provo High School, Provo, UT, November 15, 16, 18, 22, 23, 25 2024
- Arizona College Prep High School, Chandler, AZ February 6,7,8, 2025
- Reagan High School Drama Club, Pfafftown, NC April 24, 25, 26, 2025
- Cottage Theatre, Cottage Grove, OR June 2025
- Firehall Theatre, Niagara Falls ON, Feb 20 - Mar 8, 2026

Following an 11-week run of Nevermore Off-Broadway at New World Stages from January 14, 2015 to March 29, 2015, the cast recording of Nevermore was released by Broadway Records on June 16, 2015 entitled Nevermore - The Imaginary Life and Mysterious Death of Edgar Allan Poe (Original Off-Broadway Cast Recording) [2-CD set].

== Awards ==
Nevermore: The Imaginary Life and Mysterious Death of Edgar Allan Poe was nominated for four Betty Mitchell awards in 2023, receiving three, including:

- Outstanding Performance by an Ensemble (Performing Ensemble)
- Outstanding Choreography or Fight Direction (Laura Krewski)
- Outstanding Musical Direction (Ruth Alexander)
- Outstanding Direction (Jonathan Christenson)-nomination

Nevermore: The Imaginary Life and Mysterious Death of Edgar Allan Poe was nominated for three Lucille Lortel Awards in 2015, Including:

- Outstanding Musical (Jonathan Christenson)
- Outstanding Choreography (Laura Krewski)
- Outstanding Costume Design (Bretta Gerecke)

Additionally, Nevermore was nominated for one Dora Award in 2009:

- Outstanding Production of a Musical (Catalyst Theatre)

Was nominated for eight Sterling Awards, receiving seven in 2009, including:

- Outstanding Production of a Musical (Catalyst Theatre)
- Outstanding New Play (Jonathan Christenson) - Nomination
- Outstanding Director (Jonathan Christenson)
- Outstanding Costume Design (Bretta Gerecke)
- Outstanding Lighting Design (Bretta Gerecke)
- Outstanding Score of a Play or Musical (Jonathan Christenson and Wade Staples)
- Outstanding Musical Director (Jonathan Christenson)
- Outstanding Choreography or Fight Direction (Laura Krewski)

Was nominated for six Betty Mitchell Awards, receiving two in 2011:

- Outstanding Production of a Musical (Catalyst Theatre)
- Outstanding Costume Design (Bretta Gerecke)
- Outstanding Lighting Design (Bretta Gerecke) - Nomination
- Outstanding Musical Director (Jonathan Christenson) - Nomination
- Outstanding Performance by an Actor (Scott Shpeley) - Nomination
- Outstanding Choreography (Laura Krewski) - Nomination

Was nominated for four SATAwards, receiving three in 2012:

- Outstanding Production (Catalyst Theatre)
- Outstanding Costume Design (Bretta Gerecke)
- Outstanding Set Design (Bretta Gerecke)
- Outstanding Ensemble (Ensemble) - Nomination
