= GravyTrain =

- Directed by: April Mullen
- Written by: Tim Doiron
- Produced by: Tim Doiron; April Mullen
- Starring: Tim Doiron; April Mullen; Jennifer Dale; Colin Mochrie
- Music by: Daniel Lanois
- Distributed by: Alliance Films
- Release date: 23 April 2010
- Running time: 85 minutes
- Country: Canada
- Language: English

GravyTrain is a 2010 Canadian comedy film directed by April Mullen who also produced the feature with Tim Doiron under the company name G-Train Productions.

== Plot ==
Charles Gravytrain (Tim Doiron) is a policeman in the community of Gypsy Creek, a present-day community whose appearance resembles the 1970s. He and his partner Uma Booma (April Mullen) are attempting to arrest Jimmy Fish Eyes, blamed for the murder of several people including Gravytrain's father. During their quest for justice, Gravytrain and Booma are themselves blamed for the murders and are forced underground until they can escape their frameup. During this time, they become actors in a snuff film produced by Hansel Suppledick (Ryan Tilley).

== Cast ==
- Tim Doiron as Charles Gravytrain
- April Mullen as Uma Booma
- Jennifer Dale as Harriette Handlescock
- Tim Meadows as Full Serve
- Colin Mochrie as Mayor Chester Chubbins
- Kyle Schmid as Lance Dancaster
- Ryan Tilley as Hansel Suppledick
- A. C. Peterson as Sergeant Leroy Fatts
- Peter Keleghan as Houston Gravytrain, Senior
- Chris Baker as Willy Cheddars
- Alan Frew as Ewan McCauley

== Production ==
The film's 15-day shoot at Niagara Falls, Ontario used Red One camera technology. Many scenes were filmed at the Olde Country Antiques facility whose interiors were suitable for a 1970s-styled set.

The cast includes Alan Frew of the rock band Glass Tiger in his first feature film appearance.

== Release ==
The film is distributed by Alliance Films. It premiered in Toronto on 23 April 2010 and has a limited release schedule in Montreal and Ottawa the following month.

== Reception ==
Initial reviews were mostly negative. Liz Braun of the Toronto Sun declared the production "a cute idea, but it should never have been a movie." The Toronto Star's Bruce DeMara also considered the film a bomb, blasting the production as "wretchedly and resolutely not amusing." The Globe and Mail's Liam Lacey also panned the film, deeming the work "at best, a distended TV sketch and at worst like something improvised by middle-school kids with cameras." Norman Wilner of Now considered GravyTrain to be an "empty husk of frantic mugging, pointless 1970s movie references and unearned self-regard." Eye Weekly took a somewhat favourable view, noting among other elements the "unexpectedly gorgeous cinematography."
