= Janine Theriault =

Canadian actress (born 1975)

Janine Theriault (born 1975) is a Canadian actress known for her work in the films Bleeders (1997), Owning Mahowny (2003), and Relax, I'm from the Future (2022), as well as the TV series A Nero Wolfe Mystery (2001–2002), MVP (2008), Degrassi: The Next Generation (2012), Being Human (2013–2014), and Bellevue (2017).

== Selected filmography ==
=== Film ===
List of film appearances, with year, title, and role shown
Year	Title	Role	Notes
1997	Bleeders	Alice Gordon	
1997	Affliction	Hettie Rogers	
1998	2 Seconds	Chris	
1999	Eye of the Beholder	Nathy	
2000	Where the Money Is	Girl #1	
2003	Owning Mahowny	Maggie	
2010	Peepers	Annette Fulvish	
2011	Funkytown	Connie	
2012	Upside Down	Miss Maguire	
2014	Pompeii	Rich wife #2	
2015	Born to Be Blue	Florence	
2018	Zoe	Isla	
2019	Goalie	Anne Sawchuk	
2022	Relax, I'm from the Future	Doris	

=== Television ===
List of television appearances, with year, title, and role shown
Year	Title	Role	Notes
1998	More Tales of the City	Bobby / Bobbi	2 episodes
2001	Further Tales of the City	Bobby / Bobbi	3 episodes
2001–02	A Nero Wolfe Mystery	Jill Hardy / Angela Paige / Ethel Varr	5 episodes
2008	MVP	Cindy Trebuchet	7 episodes
2012	Degrassi: The Next Generation	Natalie Granger	4 episodes
2013	Copper	French designer	2 episodes
2013–14	Being Human	Blake	5 episodes
2015	The Fixer	Stephanie	2 episodes
2017	Bellevue	Mayor Mother Mansfield	8 episodes
2017	19-2	Commander Gerard	2 episodes
