= Joe Cobden =

Canadian actor and filmmaker (born 1978)

- Cobden in 2026
- Born: October 7, 1978 (age 47); Halifax, Nova Scotia, Canada
- Occupations: Actor, director
- Years active: 1996–present

Joe Cobden (born October 7, 1978 in Halifax, Nova Scotia) is a Canadian actor and filmmaker. He started performing at age 10 as a street vaudevillian, touring festivals worldwide. In 1996, at age 17, Cobden enrolled at Concordia University's Theatre Performance Programme, in Montreal.

Cobden played triplets in the television series Living in Your Car, for which he received a Gemini Award nomination for Best Supporting Actor in a Comedy Series at the 26th Gemini Awards in 2011, as well as the lead role in the movie Peepers, for which he was nominated for a 2011 Canadian Comedy Award (best actor). He was the sole voice role in the animated television series Knuckleheads, for which he played over 60 characters was a Canadian Screen Award nominee for Best Performance in an Animated Program or Series at the 5th Canadian Screen Awards in 2017.

As a director, he made six shorts for Sesame Street, musical videos for Plants and Animals, The Barr Brothers, and Mike O'Brien, and short films with premieres at SXSW, TIFF, and Palm Springs. His choreographic films have won awards, including at Cinédans and the Cabbagetown Film Festival.

He was the showrunner of a sketch comedy show for Quibi, produced by Abso Lutely and Supper Club. The show, Toothpix, was based on a series of absurd video Yelp “reviews” of LA restaurants.

He is the writer and lead actor of four musicals with Canadian musician Socalled. All premiered at Kampnagel in Hamburg.

He was nominated for a Dora Mavor Moore Award in 2015 for the lead role in the Tarragon Theatre production of Ibsen's An Enemy of the People.

== Filmography ==
=== Film ===
| Year | Title | Role | Notes |
|---|---|---|---|
| 2001 | Suddenly Naked | Patrick McKeating | |
| 2002 | Summer | Miller | |
| 2002 | Abandon | Student on Cell Phone | |
| 2002 | Swindle | Junior | |
| 2002 | Confessions of a Dangerous Mind | Unknown Comic | |
| 2003 | Hollywood North | Howard Atkins | |
| 2003 | Jericho Mansions | Vikes | |
| 2004 | The Day After Tomorrow | Zack | |
| 2004 | The Aviator | Another Guest #1 | |
| 2005 | The Recommendations | Philip Swan | |
| 2007 | I'm Not There | Sonny | |
| 2008 | Blindness | Policeman | |
| 2008 | The American Trap | Jeffrey Cohen | |
| 2010 | I Heart Doomsday | Amnesia expert | |
| 2010 | Peepers | Steve Sherman | |
| 2010 | Devil | Dwight | |
| 2011 | Source Code | Lab Technician | |
| 2012 | The Vow | Jim | |
| 2013 | Gibraltar | Agent Carlyle | |
| 2013 | Beneath the Harvest Sky | Mr. Soucy | |
| 2014 | Pawn Sacrifice | Motel Clerk | |
| 2015 | Born to Be Blue | Actor Dick | |
| 2016 | X-Men: Apocalypse | Air Force Official | |
| 2016 | Mean Dreams | Elbert Ford | |
| 2016 | Arrival | Cryptographer | |
| 2017 | Radius | Sheriff Laredo / TV Reporter | |
| 2017 | Allure | Laura's brother | |
| 2018 | On the Basis of Sex | Allen Derr | |
| 2019 | The New On Cinema Oscar Special | Prosecutor | |
| 2021 | The United States vs. Billie Holiday | George Jessel | |
| 2023 | Beau Is Afraid | News Correspondent (Brian Galloway) | |
| 2025 | The Players | Bruce | |
| 2026 | Being Heumann | Hamilton Jordan | |
| 2026 | The Stunt Driver | Bob Fortier | |

=== Television ===
| Year | Title | Role | Notes |
|---|---|---|---|
| 2000 | Nuremberg | Soldier | Episode #1.2 |
| 2000 | The Hound of the Baskervilles | Perkins | Television film |
| 2001 | All Souls | Peter Cummings | Episode: "The Deal" |
| 2001 | Dice | Sefco Guy | 6 episodes |
| 2002 | Gleason | Coleman Jacoby | Television film |
| 2002 | University | Dave | Television film |
| 2005 | Human Trafficking | Richard Sapperstein | Miniseries |
| 2006 | This Is Wonderland | Mr. Joseph | Episode #3.9 |
| 2006 | Angela's Eyes | Dozer | 13 episodes |
| 2009 | Carny | Rogers | Television film |
| 2009 | The Line | Steve | 3 episodes |
| 2010 | Bloodletting & Miraculous Cures | Zoltan | 5 episodes |
| 2010–2011 | Living in Your Car | | |
| 2011 | The Drunk and on Drugs Happy Funtime Hour | Private Camembert | 2 episodes |
| 2012 | Republic of Doyle | Bruce Michaels | Episode: "Head Over Heels" |
| 2012 | Knuckleheads | Every characters | All episodes |
| 2012 | Murdoch Mysteries | Gideon Turner | Episode: "Twentieth Century Murdoch" |
| 2015 | Fargo | Percy Bluth | Episode: "Rhinoceros" |
| 2015 | The Art of More | Todd Fletcher | 9 episodes |
| 2015–2016 | This Life | Gregory Gilchrist | 6 episodes |
| 2016 | Modern Family | Tourist | Episode: "Double Click" |
| 2016 | Blindspot | Jeffrey Kantor | Episode: "Hero Fears Imminent Rot" |
| 2017 | The Kennedys: After Camelot | Dun Gifford | Episode #1.2 |
| 2017 | Bellevue | Father Jameson | 6 episodes |
| 2017 | Saving Hope | Abbadon | Episode: "Leap of Faith" |
| 2018 | Sleeper | Arthur Stern | Television film |
| 2018 | Suits | Jeremy Stiller | Episode: "Right-Hand Man" |
| 2019 | Cavendish | Felix | 4 episodes |
| 2019 | Street Legal | Simon Tey | Episode: "Neighbours" |
| 2021 | Antisocial Distance | Marty | 3 episodes |
| 2021 | The Sinner | Chief Lou Raskin | 7 episodes |
| 2022 | Transplant | Alex | Episode: "Fracture" |
| 2022 | Moonshine | Ted | Episode: "Call of the Kraken" |
| 2022 | Three Pines | Hayden Smith | 4 episodes |
| 2023 | Children Ruin Everything | Taylor | 3 episodes |
| 2023 | Wong & Winchester | Garry | 6 episodes |
