= Howie Miller =

Cree comedian

Howie Miller is a Cree comedian from Edmonton, Canada. He is best known for his stand-up comedy performances and his role in the main cast of the sketch comedy show Caution: May Contain Nuts.

== Personal life ==
Miller was born into the Paul Band before being fostered by, then adopted into, a German family in south Edmonton starting at the age of six months. His adoptive family encouraged him to connect with his Indigenous heritage. He worked a number of odd jobs, including as a firefighter and at a car wash, before starting to perform stand-up comedy in his early 20s as a way of supporting his family.

One of Miller's sons, Tyson Houseman, is an actor who played Quil Ateara in the Twilight films. Another son, Todd Houseman, performs with Ben Gorodetzky as the comedy duo Folk Lordz.

Howie currently lives on Vancouver Island in British Columbia, Canada.

== Career ==
Miller is best known as a main cast member of the APTN sketch comedy show Caution: May Contain Nuts, which received many nominations at the Canadian Screen Awards. Miller, in drag, plays Marta, one half (along with Sheldon Elter's Delmer) of an Indigenous couple living in a trailer park. The characters originated as part of Miller and Elter's stand-up routines and improv work. The couple's story was eventually spun off into the sitcom Delmer and Marta, which follows them as they move to "big city" of Morningside, where Marta gets a job as the host of a news show.

Miller continues to perform stand-up, and has performed in such settings as Just for Laughs, the Winnipeg Comedy Festival, and the Halifax Comedy Festival. In 2022, he released the stand-up album Colonize This. He makes regular appearances on CBC Radio One comedy show The Debaters.
