= 18 to Life =

Canadian sitcom television series

- Genre: Sitcom
- Created by: Derek Schreyer; Karen Troubetzkoy
- Starring: Stacey Farber; Michael Seater; Peter Keleghan; Ellen David; Alain Goulem; Angela Asher; Arielle Shiri; Jesse Rath; Tiio Horn; Erin Agostino
- Composer: Ned Bouhalassa
- Country of origin: Canada
- Original language: English
- No. of seasons: 2
- No. of episodes: 25

Production
- Executive producers: Derek Schreyer; Karen Troubetzkoy; Andrew Orenstein; Arnie Gelbart
- Producers: Ian Whitehead; Neil Bregman
- Production locations: Montreal, Quebec
- Editors: Benjamin Duffield; Arthur Tarnowski
- Camera setup: Single
- Running time: 22 minutes

Original release
- Network: CBC
- Release: January 4, 2010 – March 28, 2011

18 to Life is a Canadian sitcom television series that debuted on January 4, 2010, on CBC. The series was shown in Quebec on Vrak.TV with the title Majeurs et mariés.

== Synopsis ==
The show stars Stacey Farber and Michael Seater as Jessie Hill and Tom Bellow, a young couple who decide, on a dare, to get married right out of high school. The cast also includes Peter Keleghan and Ellen David as Tom's parents Ben and Judith Bellow, and Alain Goulem and Angela Asher as Jessie's parents Phil Hill and Tara Mercer. The two families live next door to each other and ascribe to the adage that "good fences make good neighbors." Jessie's parents are free-spirited and do not believe in societal constructs of marriage or organized religion. They have a refugee from Iraq living in their basement. Tom's parents are traditional white-collar sticklers for rules. Tom's father is a judge who converted to Judaism when he married and Tom's mother is a homemaker. Jessie and Tom eventually settle into the attic suite of Tom's parents' house as their first marital home and try to balance college, work, and the trials of being young newlyweds. The show is set in Montreal, Quebec.

== Production ==
The series was originally announced in 2008 as a co-production between CBC and the American television network ABC, although ABC later dropped out of the production. The pilot was filmed in 2008 and the rest of the first season was filmed in the summer of 2009. The CW, another U.S. network, had interest in the series and announced on July 15, 2010 that it would pick up the show.

Season 2 was filmed in the summer of 2010 and returned to CBC on January 3, 2011, with 13 new episodes.

CBC has officially canceled the show and there will be no season three. The final episode, the 25th, was telecast on March 28, 2011.

== Episodes ==
=== Season 1 (2010) ===
No. overall	No. in season	Title	Directed by	Written by	Original release date	Prod. code
1	1	"A Modest Proposal"	Peter Wellington	Story by : Derek Schreyer & Karen Troubetzkoy; Teleplay by : Derek Schreyer	January 4, 2010; August 3, 2010 (The CW)	101
Tom and Jessie have been neighbors and in love with each other for years. Yet their parents and their friends remain skeptical that their love will last. So when Tom and Jessie step up and announce that they are getting married at just 18 years old, they are greeted with a fair share of disapproval. However, Tom and Jessie feel their love is truly genuine and plan to prove to their family and friends that love can conquer all.
2	2	"No Strings Attached"	Paolo Barzman	Story by : Derek Schreyer and Karen Troubetzkoy; Teleplay by : Karen Troubetzkoy	January 11, 2010; August 3, 2010 (The CW)	102
Tom and Jessie's attempt to find a place of their own backfires disastrously.
3	3	"It's My Party"	Peter Wellington	Jenn Engels	January 18, 2010; August 10, 2010 (The CW)	103
Jessie makes an ill-fated stab at winning Judith over at her belated bridal shower; while Tom gets roped into letting the dads crash his bachelor party.
4	4	"Detour"	Paolo Barzman	Story by : Derek Schreyer & Karen Troubetzkoy; Teleplay by : Derek Schreyer	January 25, 2010; August 10, 2010 (The CW)	104
Tom's manhood is tested when Jessie tries to teach him to drive.
5	5	"Baby Got Bank"	Peter Wellington	Andrew De Angelis & Derek Schreyer	February 1, 2010 (CAN); August 17, 2010 (The CW)	105
Jessie and Tom enter the dangerous waters of the joint bank account; Judith tries to home in on Tara's exercise regime.
6	6	"Goy Story"	Stefan Pleszczynski	Skander Halim	February 8, 2010; August 17, 2010 (The CW)	106
A secret from Ben's past threatens to ignite over a family dinner with a rabbi. Guest Star: Harvey Atkin as Rabbi Goldstein
7	7	"Hanging Pictures"	Paolo Barzman	Story by : Derek Schreyer; Teleplay by : Karen Troubetzkoy & Rob Sheridan	March 1, 2010; Unaired (The CW)	107
Tom discovers that parental endorsement does nothing for his sex life.
8	8	"Phil 'Er Up"	Stefan Pleszczynski	Derek Schreyer	March 8, 2010; Unaired (The CW)	108
A fight between Phil and Tara forces the newlyweds to take Phil on as a roommate.
9	9	"Working Noon to Five"	Stefan Pleszczynski	Story by : Derek Schreyer & Rob Sheridan; Teleplay by : Derek Schreyer	March 15, 2010; Unaired (The CW)	109
Tom and Phil team up in an ill-fated business scheme; Jessie gets in over her head when helping Judith re-design her kitchen.
10	10	"Guess Who's Coming to Dinner"	Stefan Pleszczynski	Skander Halim	March 22, 2010; Unaired (The CW)	110
The parents get trapped in Phil's garage with unresolved tensions and hash brownies; Tom and Jessie duel in the kitchen over what to serve their parents for dinner.
11	11	"In Sickness and in Health"	Peter Wellington	Rob Sheridan	April 5, 2010; Unaired (The CW)	111
Judith and Jessie compete to look after Tom when he gets a cold; Ben is horrified to learn Phil is in Mensa; Tara deals with an irate mailman.
12	12	"Wingman"	Paolo Barzman	Karen Troubetzkoy	April 12, 2010; Unaired (The CW)	112
When Tom tries to help Carter land a girl, he catches the eye of her best friend; Jessie flirts with the road not taken when she decides to party with Monica and her single gals.

=== Season 2 (2011) ===
No.	Title	Directed by	Written by	Original release date	Prod. code
13	"One Is the Loneliest Number"	Stefan Pleszczynski	Derek Schreyer	January 3, 2011	201
Tom and Jessie take inventory of their past sexual partners. Phil's vacation plans hit a snag when Tara's past catches up with her passport.
14	"15 Minutes of Shame"	Paolo Barzman	Skander Halim	January 10, 2011	202
When Wendy does a documentary on why marriages work or fail, the couples do interviews that force them to rethink their relationships. Meanwhile, Tom just wants to fix a stubborn ceiling leak in the attic.
15	"Part Time Lovers"	Stefan Pleszczynski	Story by : Rob Sheridan and Andrew DeAngelis; Teleplay by : Andrew DeAngelis	January 17, 2011	203
Tom and Jessie get jobs at the same book store, only Jessie is the boss and Tom is her Janitor. When Ben discovers yoga, he relaxes so much it drives Judith crazy. Phil goes to war with the squirrels.
16	"I Do and I Don't"	Paolo Barzman	Story by : Derek Schreyer and Karen Troubetzkoy; Teleplay by : Derek Schreyer	January 24, 2011	204
Tara shocks everyone when she accepts Phil's joke marriage proposal. Carter and Tom have a falling out when Tom spills Carter's secret.
17	"Overcooked"	Stefan Pleszczynski	Andrew DeAngelis	January 31, 2011	205
Tom tries to one-up his mother in the art of cooking. Tara discovers the art of flirtation and competes with Jessie for the attention of the very beau Jeff. Ben discovers the uses and abuses of saying "My Bad".
18	"Family Portrait"	Paolo Barzman	Paul Aitken	February 7, 2011	206
When Tara gives the Bellows a really awful painting she's made, Ben takes extreme measures to get rid of it. Tom and Jessie misplace a very embarrassing video they made.
19	"Sleepless in the Attic"	Nicolas Monette	Sherry White	February 14, 2011	207
When Phil's school pal Serena bikes into town for a surprise visit, she has an unusual request. Jessie and Tom's sleep troubles lead to a temporary separation.
20	"The Flushing Point"	Paolo Barzman	Shelley Eriksen	February 21, 2011	208
A row over toilet seat etiquette escalates into an all-out war of the sexes. Judith wants to re-enter the workforce. Phil disguises a turkey fryer as a coffee urn.
21	"Miss Conceived"	Paolo Barzman	Rob Sheridan	February 28, 2011	209
Tom discovers a positive pregnancy stick and suddenly everyone is pregnant. Wendy builds a family memory box for her school project.
22	"If a Bellow Falls in the Forest"	Paolo Barzman	Karen Troubetzkoy	March 7, 2011	210
Nature is never the same when the families roll onto the campground in an immense RV. Tom and Jessie escape from their parents only to get lost in the woods.
23	"Like Father, Like Son's Best Friend"	Paolo Barzman	Josh Gal	March 14, 2011	211
When Tom ropes Carter into helping his father with taxes, Carter blossoms into the 'son Ben always wanted'. A heart-broken Ava crashes out at the loft, Jessie and Tom can't get seem to rid of her.
24	"The Gate"	Nicolas Monette	Karen Troubetzkoy	March 21, 2011	212
When Tom's cruel grandmother dies after discovering he's married, it leaves a guilt wracked Tom to invent nice things to say at her eulogy. Phil builds a gate in the fence dividing their properties so that the Bellows can visit their grandma's shrine.
25	"House of Cards"	Paolo Barzman	Derek Schreyer	March 28, 2011	213
Tom and Jessie exchange anniversary gifts they can't afford, while their parents give them a gift that only the parents enjoy.

== International distribution ==
18 to Life was broadcast in the United States on The CW. The first six episodes were shown in August 2010. On August 19, 2010, The CW announced that it had removed the series from its schedule. On August 24, 2010 it was reported that Arnie Gelbart, executive producer of the series and CEO of the production company Galafilm Productions, said The CW would show the remaining six episodes of the first season in December 2010; this never did occur.

In India, Zee Café began broadcasting the first season on February 9, 2011.

== Reception ==
=== Critical reception ===
John Doyle of The Globe and Mail said that 18 to Life "crackles with wit" and that "Peter Keleghan is in fine fettle as Tom's uptight dad." Quebecor Media's Bill Harris called the premise "kind of refreshing" and described it as a "Canadian combination of Meet the Parents and Modern Family." Rob Owen of the Pittsburgh Post-Gazette described the series as a "gentle, intermittently entertaining Canadian import." He also compared 18 to Life to the sitcom Dharma & Greg. Roger Catlin of The Hartford Courant found 18 to Life to be "kind of sweet in a Disney/ABC Family kind of way."

Brad Oswald of the Winnipeg Free Press said there is "plenty of next-door comedy" however he found the premise "simply isn't believable". Glenn Garvin of The Miami Herald does not like the series. "The CW, a network aimed at teenage girls, apparently couldn't find an American network stupid or venal enough to make a sitcom about the amusing foibles of teen marriage. Thanks for stepping in, Canada. What would we do without you?" Megan Angelo of The Wall Street Journal leads off her review by mistakenly claiming this is "adapted from a Canadian hit" when there is no American adaptation of the show. She then mentioned the general critical decrying of the glamourisation of out-of-wedlock pregnancy in the films Juno and Knocked Up and then says that out-of-pregnancy wedlock is not any better for teenagers. Angelo goes on to say that "what makes it really hard to watch is Tom and Jessie's casual discourse on sex." She further explains that what makes 18 to Life so difficult to watch compared to shows such as Gossip Girl and 90210 is that creating a believable world and "trying to legitimize the whole thing only makes it worse – and usually, the CW doesn't try." Mary McNamara, television critic for Los Angeles Times, opens her review by saying, "The setup for this CW show isn't anything new. Except, possibly, in its old-fashioned commitment to marriage." McNamara later says "It is much more shocking to see these young people leap into matrimony than it would be if they were just having sex or even moving in together." As to the writing, McNamara says it "plays like an improv exercise in a high school drama class".

Jaime Weinman of Maclean's reviewed the negative American reviews, in particular those from the Los Angeles Times and The Wall Street Journal, and had concern about their "criticizing the show because it's about two over-18 teenagers who get married." In writing of The Wall Street Journal review Weinman said it is an "odd presumption" that "a relatively realistic portrayal of teenage sex, of somewhat normal and (comparatively) de-glamorized teens who have been sexually active, is worse than the glossy version we get on the CW's own shows." In response to McNamara's comment in Los Angeles Times about the marriage of the two main characters being shocking Weinman said, "That's part of the point of the show: the characters make a decision that has more impact, legally and culturally, than any other, and one that their parents fear will ruin their lives."

=== Ratings ===
The show premiered on January 4, 2010 on CBC. Only the weekly top 30 ratings are available to the public in Canada and 18 to Life never ranked in the top 30 during its first season.

The U.S. premiere on The CW on August 3, 2010 garnered 1.01 million viewers and a 0.4 rating with adults 18–49 and even lost viewers from an encore of the low rated summer reality series Plain Jane which preceded the premiere. The next two episodes aired on The CW on August 10 and fell in the ratings even further with only 0.76 million viewers and a 0.3 rating in the adults 18–49 demographic.

Order	Episode	U.S. air date	Rating	Share	Rating/Share (18–49)	Viewers (millions)	Rank (timeslot)
1	"A Modest Proposal"	August 3, 2010	0.7	1	0.4/1	1.010	5
2	"No Strings Attached"	August 3, 2010	0.6	1	0.3/1	0.862	5
3	"It's My Party"	August 10, 2010	0.6	1	0.3/1	0.747	5
4	"Detour"	August 10, 2010	0.5	1	0.3/1	0.776	5
5	"Baby Got Bank"	August 17, 2010	0.5	1	0.3/1	0.802	5
6	"Goy Story"	August 17, 2010	0.5	1	0.3/1	0.746	5

== Home video ==
On January 18, 2011 the first season was released on DVD in both the US and Canada. The second season has not been released or announced on DVD, but both the first and second seasons are available for purchase from the Canadian iTunes Store in both HD and SD format, and were previously available on Netflix. It is currently available to stream on the media content platforms Freevee and Tubi TV.

== Streaming ==
In July 2019 the series has been released on the Canada Media Fund Encore + YouTube channel. It is also streaming on Freevee and Tubi as of 2026.
