= Men with Brooms (TV series) =

Canadian television sitcom

- Starring: Paul Gross; Anand Rajaram; Glenda Braganza; William Vaughan; Brendan Gall; Aliyah O'Brien
- Country of origin: Canada
- Original language: English
- No. of seasons: 1
- No. of episodes: 12

Production
- Executive producer: Paul Gross
- Running time: 30 minutes

Original release
- Network: CBC
- Release: October 4, 2010 – 2011

Men with Brooms is a Canadian television sitcom, which debuted on CBC Television on October 4, 2010. It is a television adaptation of the 2002 film Men with Brooms, and was filmed in Winnipeg, Manitoba, Canada.

The series stars Brendan Gall, William Vaughan, Joel Keller, Anand Rajaram, Aliyah O'Brien, Glenda Braganza, and Siobhan Murphy. The show's producer, Paul Gross, narrates and makes occasional appearances as Chris Cutter, his character in the original film.

Men with Brooms aired for one season and was not renewed.

== Plot ==
The series is set in the fictional town of Long Bay, Ontario, and focuses on the members of a local curling club. The series was shot at the Fort Rouge Curling Club in Winnipeg.

== DVD release ==
On November 22, 2011, Entertainment One released Men with Brooms- Season 1 on DVD in Region 1.
