= Ron Pederson =

Canadian actor, comedian and theatre director

- Born: Ronald Pederson; January 8, 1978 (age 48); Edmonton, Alberta, Canada
- Occupations: Actor, comedian, director
- Years active: 1989–present
- Known for: Improvisational theatre, theatre, MADtv
- Awards: Canadian Comedy Award, Sterling Award, SummerWorks Performance Award, Dora Mavor Moore Award

Ronald Pederson (born January 8, 1978) is a Canadian, Métis actor, comedian and theatre director who has worked extensively throughout Canada and in the United States. He has performed at most of Canada's major theatres including The Stratford Festival, The Royal Manitoba Theatre Centre, The Citadel Theatre, Alberta Theatre Projects, The Arts Club, The Vancouver Playhouse, The Young Centre, The Canadian Stage Company, The Tarragon Theatre, Theatre Passe Muraille, Soulpepper and The SummerWorks Festival. Pederson is an alumnus of Toronto’s The Second City and has also worked extensively in television and may be best known for his Canadian Comedy Award-nominated work (Canadian Comedy Award Best Television Performance) and his three seasons on Fox Television's MADtv.

== Career ==
Born in Edmonton, Alberta, Pederson began working professionally at a very young age. He appeared at the Citadel Theatre, The Phoenix Theatre, playwright Stewart Lemoine's Teatro La Quindicina and the Edmonton International Fringe Festival. In 1995, at the invitation of Dana Andersen, Pederson joined the cast of the live improvised soap opera Die-Nasty. Over the next eight years he performed weekly on the soap, worked with notable guest stars Mark McKinney, Mike Myers and Joe Flaherty, and completed the Die-Nasty Annual 53-Hour Soap-A-Thon. In 2002, Pederson won a Sterling Award for his portrayal of Ray Dooley in Martin McDonagh's play The Beauty Queen of Leenane. He is an eight-time Sterling Award nominee.

Pederson gained attention from Hollywood in March 2002, while performing at The Second City with Martin Short, Catherine O'Hara, and Fred Willard in Joe Flaherty's improvised show The Soap Also Rises. He turned down an invitation to join Toronto's Second City main stage cast to work on Fox Television's sketch comedy series MADtv that September. He performed with them for three seasons and his work on the show's tenth season was recognized with a nomination for Best Television Performance at the Canadian Comedy Awards. Following his departure from MADtv, Pederson wrote and performed sketches on CBS's The Late Late Show with Craig Ferguson for one season before returning to theatre in Canada.

He moved to Toronto in 2007 and played Seymour in Little Shop of Horrors at The Canadian Stage Company. Pederson has since worked at Tarragon Theatre, Theatre Passe Muraille, The Summerworks Festival and The Toronto Fringe Festival. He played Quasimodo in Catalyst Theatre's Hunchback in Edmonton and Vancouver, and James in the world-premiere of the award-winning play Extinction Song in Edmonton (Sterling Award), Toronto (Summerworks Spotlight Award) and Halifax (Merritt Award nomination). In Vancouver, his performance of Carmen Ghia in The Producers earned him a Jessie Richardson Award nomination. He joined the acting company of the Stratford Festival in 2013, playing Lancelot Gobbo in The Merchant of Venice.

In October 2008, Pederson became a founding member and co-artistic director – with Matt Baram and Naomi Snieckus – of the three-time Canadian Comedy Award-winning improv theatre company The National Theatre of the World. They began producing two weekly shows in Toronto: Impromptu Splendor, an improvised one-act play; and The Carnegie Hall Show, an improvised variety show. They later produced The Soaps, an improvised soap opera serial, and Fiasco Playhouse experimental improv theatre. In 2009, The National Theatre of the World won the RBC Arts Professional Award. Pederson, Baram and Snieckus performed their shows at the Summerworks Theatre Festival, the Young Centre for the Performing Arts' Global Cabaret Festival, and Theatre Passe Muraille in Toronto; at the Barrow Street Theatre off-Broadway; and in Chicago, Los Angeles, Charleston, Edmonton, Halifax and Europe. In October 2011, Pederson won a Canadian Comedy Award for Best Male Improviser for his work with the National Theatre of the World.

Pederson left the National Theatre of the World in 2012 and co-founded a new company called the Theatre Department with Daniela Vlaskalic. The Theatre Department's goal is "to produce simple, elegant productions of the world's best language-based plays [...] with an emphasis on accentuating the power of theatre's singular, live dynamic." Their first production was Stewart Lemoine's The Exquisite Hour (2012) at the Factory Theatre starring Ted Dykstra, with Pederson in his directorial debut. The Globe and Mail said, "Ron Pederson, gives the play an impeccable staging." The company's second production was Lemoine's Pith! (2014) at Theatre Passe Muraille, for which he was nominated for a Dora Award in 2014. A Stagedoor review said, "Pederson, himself, is a marvel. He speaks Lemoine’s period-infused lines with exactly the right intonation and emphasis. The bizarre characters he plays during the Ecuadorean journey show off his amazing ability to transform himself completely."

In 2015, Pederson joined the Soulpepper acting company and produced and directed Wonderstruck Live! An Improvised Play at both the Storefront Theatre and The Bad Dog Theatre Company.

In 2016, Pederson appeared for an extended run with renowned improvisation company English Lovers in Vienna, starred in the acclaimed improvised musical One Night Only at the Factory Theatre in Toronto, and produced and starred in a remount of Extinction Song at the Highland Arts Theatre in Sydney, Nova Scotia.

Pederson was nominated for a 2016 Dora Award for Best Actor in a Musical for One Night Only; the Greatest Musical Never Written. The nomination was unprecedented as Pederson was the first nominee in the category to have entirely improvised his performance.

In 2018 Pederson returned to the Stratford Festival as an assistant director. and won the Sterling Award for Best Actor for No Exit. He also co-created The Wonder Pageant with Kayla Lorette for Coal Mine Theatre which earned a 2019 Dora Mavor Moore Award nomination and win for Best Ensemble.

In 2019 Pederson appeared in Four Chords and Gun by John Ross Bowie in Toronto and Chicago, Illinois.

I’m 2021 Pederson created and directed A Miracle on Queen Street for The Capitol Theatre in Port Hope.

In 2021 Pederson was commissioned by Winnipeg’s Shakespeare in the Ruins to write what would become his first play The Player King, which he subsequently directed for the company in 2022. The Winnipeg free press said “ Directed by Pederson, the tone is fanciful and often humorous. But it’s not entirely a comedy. At its heart, it is a serious exploration of the meaning of theatre, and a timely treatise.”

In 2023 Ron joined the MainStage cast of Toronto’s Second City.

Pederson's film and television credits include providing the voice of the Golly Gee Kid in the YTV cartoon Sidekick, and guest starring on She's the Mayor, InSecurity, Degrassi: The Next Generation, Murdoch Mysteries, and New Eden. He played Frank in the family film Vampire Dog. More recently he has had a recurring role on The Next Step and a guest role on Private Eyes.
