= Caution: May Contain Nuts =

Canadian television comedy series

Caution: May Contain Nuts is a Canadian television sketch comedy series, which premiered on APTN in 2007. Created by the Edmonton-based stage comedy troupe Blacklisted, the series focuses partially but not exclusively on First Nations-themed comedy. In 2010, the series was also picked up for rebroadcast on Bite TV.

The show's core cast consists of Matthew Alden Dykes, Aimée Beaudoin, Sheldon Elter, Jeff Halaby, James Higuchi, Howie Miller, Dana Andersen, Ryan Parker and Mark Meer. Guest performers have included Joe Flaherty, Adam Beach, Malcolm Azania, Shaun Johnston, Colin Mochrie, Roseanne Supernault and Graham Greene; Flaherty revived some of his former SCTV characters, while Greene appeared in a sketch that satirized his Academy Award-nominated performance in Dances with Wolves.

== Delmer & Marta ==
In 2016 Miller and Elter spun one of the show's recurring sketches off into the eight-episode APTN sitcom Delmer & Marta. The spinoff portrayed the titular characters as a married couple moving from their longtime residence in a mobile home on a First Nations reserve to the "big city" of Morningside so Marta could take a job as a morning television host. The series also starred Kevin McDonald as station manager Creston, and featured a guest appearance by Dave Foley as the station owner.

== Awards ==
The series received three Canadian Comedy Award nominations at the 12th Canadian Comedy Awards in 2011, for Best Performance by an Ensemble, Best Performance by a Male (Miller) and Best Performance by a Female (Beaudoin). At the 26th Gemini Awards in 2011, Andersen and Bruce Pirrie received a nomination for Best Direction in a Comedy Series or Program.

They received two Canadian Screen Award nominations at the 1st Canadian Screen Awards in 2013, for Best Direction in a Variety or Sketch Comedy Program or Series (Andersen and Francis Damberger) and Best Writing in a Variety or Sketch Comedy Program or Series. At the 7th Canadian Screen Awards in 2019, the show was nominated for Best Ensemble Performance in a Sketch Comedy Program or Series and Best Writing in a Variety or Sketch Comedy Program or Series.
