= Glenda Braganza =

Canadian actress

Glenda Braganza is a Canadian television and stage actress who has appeared in several Canadian and American television shows and films.

Braganza was born in Halifax, Nova Scotia to Indian-Goan parents, and was raised in Ottawa, Ontario. She lived for many years in Montreal, Quebec, Canada, before moving to Toronto. After graduating from Concordia University in 2001, she worked and received critical praise in several productions on the Montreal stage, including in Jennydog, Jane Eyre, and at the Montreal Fringe. Her various performances earned her the Montreal English Critics Circle Award as the Best Actress of 2003–04. She most recently starred as Gina Green in the Hollywood made-for-television film 10.5: Apocalypse, which was about a natural disaster to hit the United States; it starred Dean Cain and Beau Bridges.

She has also been on Canadian television with a featured role in the Stephen Surjik film Tripping the Wire, and on American television with a recurring role on the Independent Film Channel original series The Business.

== Filmography ==
- My First Wedding (2004): Young Woman
- Tripping the Wire: A Stephen Tree Mystery (2005): Angie Baron
- 10.5: Apocalypse (2006): Gina Green
- Last Exit (2006): Sonogram Technician
- Infected (2008)
- Afterwards (2008): Rachel
- Men with Brooms (2010): Rani
- Saving Hope (2012–2015): Dr. Melanda Tolliver
- Holidaze (2013): Stacy
- A Simple Favor (2018): Mrs. Kerry Glenda
