= Sheldon Elter =

Métis actor and writer

Sheldon Elter is a Métis actor and writer based in Edmonton, Canada. He is particularly known for his one-man show Métis Mutt and his acting and writing for the comedy show Caution: May Contain Nuts.

== Early life ==
Elter was born into a Métis family in Grimshaw in Alberta's Peace River Country, where he grew up under an abusive, alcoholic father. Before his acting career gained momentum, he worked in Alberta's oil sands.

Elter appeared on the fourth season of Canadian Idol, where he made it into the top 14 but was eliminated before the finals. He was also a member of the ukulele cover band The Be Arthurs, who were regularly featured on The Irrelevant Show and won a Sterling Award for their musical direction on the Citadel Theatre's production of One Man, Two Guvnors.

== Métis Mutt ==
Elter's most famous theatrical work is the one-man show Métis Mutt. Elter wrote the first version in 2001 for a class taught by Kenneth Brown at MacEwan University. He then adapted the play for the Nextfest theatre festival, then expanded it into a sold-out show at the Edmonton International Fringe Festival. He describes the early versions as "edgy" and full of "a lot of racial stereotypes" about Indigenous people. After many years of intermittent rewriting, a new version was performed in Toronto, where it was nominated for a Dora Mavor Moore Award, then returned to the Roxy Theatre in Edmonton, where it received two Sterling Awards.

The show traces Elter's own career, starting from his early days as a struggling stand-up comedian. It draws on challenges Elter faced during his life—including the abuse he faced as a child, the racism he experienced throughout his life, and his struggles with drug and alcohol abuse—as well as the spiritual and creative growth that allowed him to overcome those challenges. The show incorporates original songs and elements of Elter's stand-up comedy routines.

Josée Thibeault translated the play into French for Edmonton's Unithéâtre.

== Acting ==
Elter wrote for and acted in the main cast of the APTN sketch comedy show Caution: May Contain Nuts, which received many nominations at the Canadian Screen Awards. Elter's character Delmer originated onstage at during a showing of Die-Nasty with Nathan Fillion at the Edmonton Fringe, and was later given a partner, Marta, played by Howie Miller. Their characters' relationship was later spun off into the sitcom Delmer and Marta, also aired by APTN.

Elter has earned a number of distinctions for other acting projects. He originated the starring role of the Métis oil worker Floyd in Matthew MacKenzie's dark comedy Bears, which won the 2018 Carol Bolt Award. He was also part of the original cast for Jonathan Christenson's acclaimed musical Nevermore: The Imaginary Life and Mysterious Death of Edgar Allan Poe.
