= Patti Stiles =

Australian actress

Patti Stiles is an actress, director, author, playwright, teacher and improvisation artist living in Australia.

== Biography ==
She received her training at Calgary, Alberta's Loose Moose Theatre under Keith Johnstone. It was there she worked with Keith Johnstone in many forms of improvisation. She performed regularly in Theatresports, Gorilla Theatre and Life Game as well as performing in Keith's plays, directing and performing in the Theatre for kids program and touring productions.

Stiles moved to Toronto, and was the artistic director of Dream Kitchen Theatre, which produced Theatresports. She then moved to Edmonton and was artistic director of Rapid Fire Theatre from 1991 to 1996. She trained and directed company members such as Mark Meer, Josh Dean, Nathan Fillion, and Kevin Gillese. Her directing credits include The Maltese Bodkin which featured Nathan Fillion (in one of his first theatrical roles) receiving an Elizabeth Sterling Haynes Award for Outstanding Fringe Production.

Stiles wrote her first Theatre For Young Audiences play, commissioned by the Provincial Museum, called If Whales Could Tell Tales. It received an Elizabeth Sterling Haynes Nomination for Outstanding Production for Theatre for Young Audiences.

Along with her Artistic Directorship she was heavily involved in the Edmonton Arts community performing for numerous theatre companies, plus the Edmonton Fringe Festival as actor, director and producer of their opening/closing ceremonies.

Stiles was a founding member of Die-Nasty: The Live Improvised Soap Opera (nominated for several Canadian Comedy Awards and winner of the 2006 award for Best Improv Troupe) and holds the record as the first female improviser to improvise 53 hours straight in the annual Die-Nasty Soap-A-Thon.

Stiles lived in London, England for a short period; during this time she worked with many of the impro companies in London. There she trained Deborah Frances-White and Tom Salinsky founders of The Spontaneity Shop and authors of The Impro Handbook, which includes a dedication to her.

Stiles moved to Melbourne and became the artistic director of Impro Melbourne from 2004 to 2009 and again 2014–2019. During this time she wrote her second theatre for young audiences play Water of Life. She tours internationally performing and teaching improvisation to theatre companies around the world.

She authored her first book, Improvise Freely, in 2021.
