= Teatro La Quindicina =

Theatre company in Edmonton Alberta since 1982

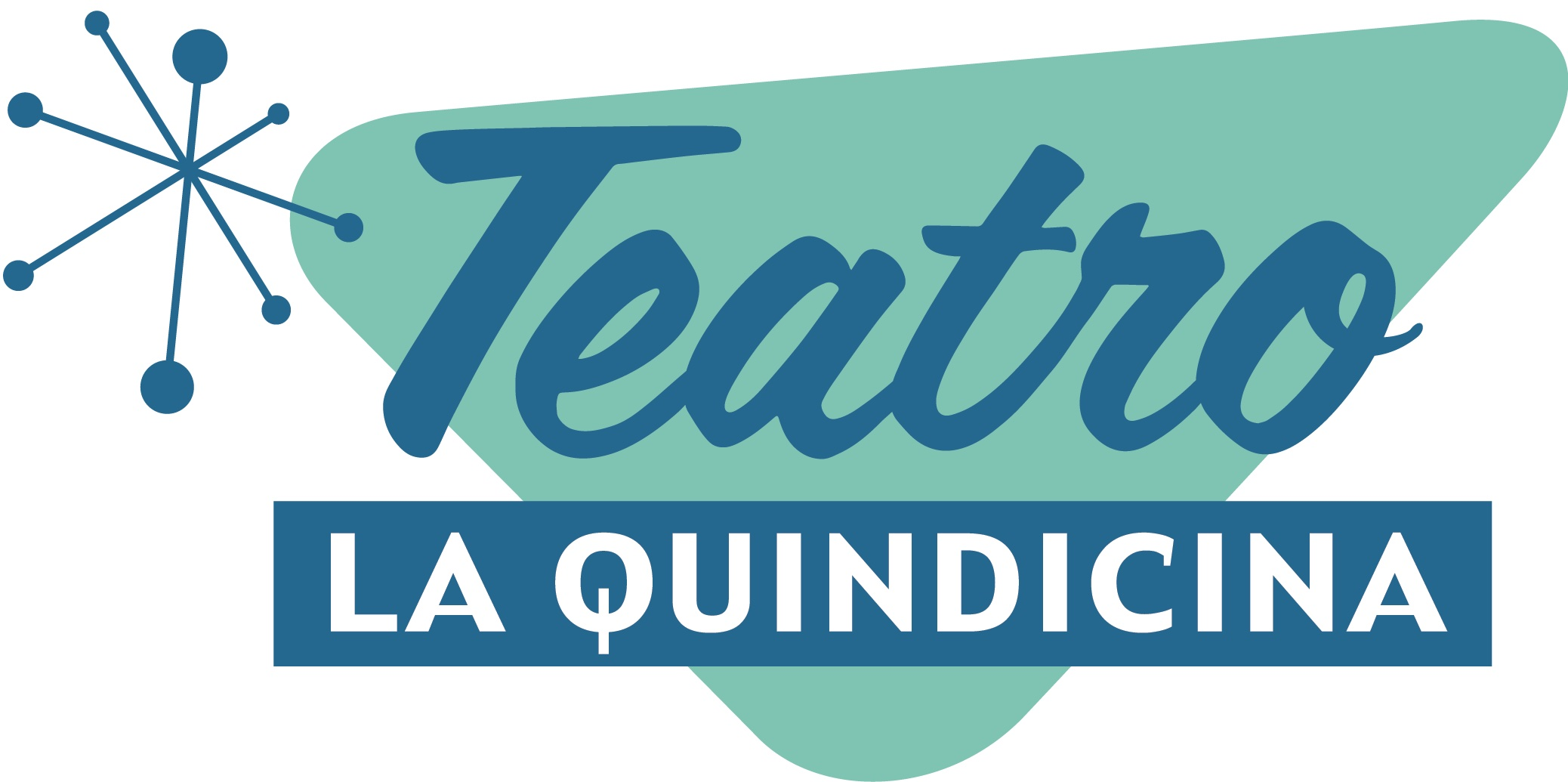
Teatro La Quindicina Logo

Teatro Live! (formally known as Teatro La Quindicina) was founded in 1982 Edmonton, Alberta, Canada, by Stewart Lemoine at the inaugural Edmonton International Fringe Festival to create comedies for Edmonton audiences.

For most of their existence, their programming has been centered around the original works of playwright Stewart Lemoine, a co-founder of the company in 1982. In recent seasons, Teatro's repertoire has been expanded to include other authors with aligned work.

Teatro Live! which takes its name from a brothel, is one of the resident theatre companies of the Varscona Theatre in Edmonton's Old Strathcona district, and was among the original companies that created The Varscona Theatre Alliance, along with Shadow Theatre and Die-Nasty. As of 2022, Lemoine remains the theatre's resident playwright.
