= The Irrelevant Show =

- Genre: Sketch comedy
- Running time: 30 minutes
- Country of origin: CAN
- Home station: CBC Radio One
- Starring: Cathy Derkach; Neil Grahn; Mark Meer; Jana O'Connor; Donovan Workun
- Original release: 2003 – 2017
- No. of seasons: 7+

The Irrelevant Show was a half-hour radio sketch comedy show that aired on CBC Radio One.

== Broadcast history ==
The show was launched in 2003, initially on Saturday afternoons during the third hour of Definitely Not the Opera (DNTO). Early in 2004 it was given its own slot on late Saturday mornings for a short series of nine shows, and in 2005 it returned as a recurring show broadcast as part of DNTO. A further series was broadcast in the summer of 2008 on Friday nights and Saturday mornings.

An Irrelevant New Year's was broadcast as a special show on December 31, 2008, featuring sketches that were not aired the previous summer. A second New Year's Eve show aired on December 31, 2009.

Further series were broadcast between 2010 and 2017.

It was announced in October 2017 that CBC Radio would not renew the program.

== Description ==
Each episode of The Irrelevant Show consists of a series of comedy sketches. Sketches typically comment on popular culture, such as Bionic Centurion Trucker, the helpline operator for The Matrix computer system, the Jane Austen Drinking Game, and a mock exposé on the Salvation Army's Special Forces unit.

=== Recording ===
The show was recorded at a variety of venues in Edmonton. The first series was recorded live at the Varscona Theatre. Subsequent episodes were recorded at the Stanley A. Milner Library Theatre in downtown Edmonton. In 2008 the series returned to the Varscona Theatre. Other series were recorded at the Yardbird Suite, La Cité Francophone, the Arden Theatre in St. Albert, and Festival Place in Sherwood Park.

== Cast and writers ==
The original cast included Wes Borg, Paul Mather, Mark Meer, Jana O'Connor and Donovan Workun.

The 2008 cast was Leona Brausen, Marianne Copithorne, Neil Grahn, Meer, O'Connor, Workun and Joe Bird. Eric Wagers provided sound effects.

The 2010 series featured the same cast with music by Jill Pollock and Ben Sures. Dave Clarke provided sound effects.

In 2013 Marianne Coppithorne was replaced by Cathy Derkach.

Writers for the 2008-2010 series include Meer, Grahn, O'Connor, Cathleen Rootsaert, Dana Andersen, Ian Boothby, Jeff Haslam, Jocelyn Ahlf, Belinda Cornish, Josh Dean, Ron Pederson, Kurt Smeaton, George Westerholm, Chris Craddock, Matt Watts, Maggie Castle, Nile Séguin and writers from Mostly Water Theatre, Gordon's Big Bald Head, and Lobster Telephone. Neil Grahn is head writer.

The show featured songs cowritten by Jan Randall and Peter Brown featuring various singers including Jocelyn Ahlf, Kieran Martin Murphy, Ryan Parker, Cathy Derkach, and Farren Timoteo accompanied by Jan Randall on piano.

== Awards ==
Best Radio Program or Clip (nominated), Canadian Comedy Awards, 2011. 2010 Season, Episode 1

Best Radio Program or Clip (nominated), Canadian Comedy Awards, 2010. "Doug, the Last Man on Earth" written by Dana Anderson and Neil Grahn, performed by Mark Meer and Grahn.

Best Regularly Scheduled Comedy Program - Bronze Medal - The 2009 New York Festivals – International Radio Broadcasting Awards.

Best Radio Clip, Canadian Comedy Awards, 2009. "Zen Hokey Pokey" written by George Westerholm, performed by Joe Bird.

Best Radio Clip (nominated), Canadian Comedy Awards, 2009. "Witch Smoke" written by Matt Stanton, performed by Mark Meer and Marianne Copithorne.
