= Mostly Water Theatre =

Canadian sketch comedy group

Mostly Water Theatre is an Edmonton-based Canadian sketch comedy group formed in 2005, consisting of comedians Craig Buchert, Elizabeth Ludwig, Jason Ludwig, Matt Stanton, Sam Varteniuk, and Trent Wilkie. The group has been nominated for a Canadian Comedy Award.

== History ==
Before the troupe formed, Craig Buchert and Matt Stanton were working together doing shows at the Edmonton International Fringe Festival, performing in a company called Soiled Sheets Productions. Meanwhile, Sam Varteniuk and Trent Wilkie were performing around Edmonton (along with Elizabeth Ludwig, Corey Taylor and Amy Neufeld) as Mostly Water Theatre (MWT). In 2005, the two pairs met in Edmonton, as suggested by Elizabeth Ludwig, and began performing regularly as MWT along with Jason Ludwig, who shoots and edits all the digital shorts.

Since then, they have produced several original sketch shows and three plays: "I’m Sticking with Kiefer", "15 Minutes", and "Gargamel". "Kiefer" and sketch show "1UP" were honored by SEE Magazine as two of the Best Plays of 2008.

"Grand Theft Auto for Intellivision", a digital short from "1UP", received recognition from the creators of Intellivision.

In January 2011, their spoof of TLC's programming was featured prominently on The Huffington Post, AOL and Funny or Die.

MWT hosted a variety show – Live at the Roxy! – and currently hosts a bi-monthly showcase of digital shorts for local filmmakers – Metro Shorts.

All members of MWT write for CBC's The Irrelevant Show.

== The Irrelevant Show ==
Mostly Water writes for nationally broadcast The Irrelevant Show on CBC Radio One. Their skit, the "Jane Austen Drinking Game" was a major hit on the show and was described as "a great combination of smart and precise and well-observed, as well as just being loud and foolish."

MWT also performed their love song about a couple living on opposite sides of a city straddling the Alberta-Saskatchewan border called Lloydminster.

In 2009, MWT was nominated for a Canadian Comedy Award for their Irrelevant Show skit called "Witch Smoke."

== Mostly Water Live at the Roxy ==
MWT started producing a set of live variety shows in 2009 called Mostly Water Live at the Roxy. Performed at The Roxy Theatre in Edmonton, the show mixes musical performances, interviews, games, and digital shorts. Past guests include NDP MP Linda Duncan, Mayor of Edmonton Stephen Mandel, and the CBC Radio’s Peter Brown.

Regular features of the variety show included "Name the 80s Sitcom", "Plunko", and a closing musical number performed by MWT.

For the 2010-2011 season of Live @ the Roxy, the show was changed to a more Saturday Night Live format with a guest host, musical guest, and news segment mixed in with live and video sketches.

== Metro Shorts ==
Since 2007, MWT produces a bi-monthly showcase for local filmmakers called Metro Shorts. Filmmakers are asked to submit five-minute digital shorts which are then shown at Metro Cinema in Edmonton, adjudicated by three celebrity judges, and voted on by the audience. The winner of the evening receives a cash prize and the winner of the season receives a grand prize (in 2009, two tickets anywhere WestJet flies.)

Past judges include Dana Andersen, Peter Brown, Dave Clarke, and Davina Stewart.

== Awards ==
Best Short (nominated)

Canadian Comedy Awards, 2018. "Here's Video Game News" written by Matt Stanton, performed by Trent Wilkie and Matt Stanton.

Best Radio Clip (nominated)

Canadian Comedy Awards, 2009. "Witch Smoke" written by Matt Stanton, performed by Mark Meer and Marianne Copithorne.

== Variety Shows ==
May 22, 2010

- Guests: MLA Laurie Blakeman, Jane Heather, Jill Pollock

April 24, 2010

- Guests: Former Edmonton Councillor Michael Phair, Chris Craddock, James Murdoch (Canadian singer-songwriter)

December 19, 2009

- Guests: Edmonton Mayor Stephen Mandel, CBC’s Peter Brown, The Be Arthurs

October 24, 2009

- Guests: NDP MP Linda Duncan, Derek Clayton, The Wheat Pool

== Plays and Sketch Shows ==
=== 2016 ===
- 2UP: Second Player

=== 2012 ===
- Reality Cheque: Live @ the Roxy! (Host: Trevor Schmidt, Music: The Bud and Yolanda Experience)

=== 2011 ===
- A Ronnie Jimmie Christmas: Live @ the Roxy! (Host: Peter Brown, Music: The Wheat Pool)
- Gargamel (written by Trent Wilkie)
- Mostly Water Hockey: Live @ the Roxy! (Host: Mark Meer, Music: F&M)
- Mostly Water Girl Party: Live @ the Roxy! (Host: Stephanie Wolfe, Music: Ariane Mahryke Lemire)

=== 2010 ===
- 15 Minutes (written by Sam Varteniuk)
- A Mostly Water Christmas: Live @ the Roxy! (Host: Chris Craddock, Music: The Wheat Pool)

=== 2009 ===
- WetWare

=== 2008 ===
- I’m Sticking with Kiefer (written by Sam Varteniuk)
- 1UP
- XXXmas 4: The Re-Gifting

=== 2007 ===
- Dreamscape Redemption Classes
- Woah Woah Woah, Hold on a Minute, Wait Just a Second, There’s Way Too Much Butter on That
- XXXmas 3: Good King WTF

=== 2006 ===
- How to Not Suck
- The Science of Funny
- XXXmas 2: Fa-la-la-la-la La-la-luck Off

=== 2005 ===
- XXXmas: Silent Night, Holy Shit

== See also ==
- The Irrelevant Show
