= Paul Morgan Donald =

Canadian composer

- Occupations: composer, musician, actor

Paul Morgan Donald is a Canadian musician, composer, and actor based in Edmonton, Alberta, Canada. He is the musical director of Die-Nasty, Edmonton's long-running improvised soap opera. He has a long-running association with the River City Shakespeare Festival as both an actor and composer, and has worked at most of Edmonton's theatres including the Citadel Theatre. He has twice been honoured with the Elizabeth Sterling Haynes Award, as Director of the Edmonton International Fringe Festival production of Reefer Madness: the Musical, and as co-composer (with Joey Trembley and Jonathan Christensen) of Catalyst Theatre's Songs for Sinners.

As a theatre composer, Paul's credits include over 20 original musicals, as well as contemporary scores for the Free Will Shakespeare Festival and original scores and sound designs for theatres across Western Canada. His musicals include Kink! a musical about 1950's pin-up icon Bettie Page, The Adventures of Wanda & Jack, an alt-country meditation on life on the road, written with partner Michele Brown, and Songs for a Dark Lady, re-assembling the words of William Shakespeare into a one-man musical about Shakespeare's tortured relationship with his muse, the Dark Lady of the Sonnets.
