= Dana Andersen =

Canadian actor, improvisor, filmmaker, writer and director

Dana Andersen is a Canadian actor, improvisor, filmmaker, writer, director and alumni of The Second City. He has served as director of the live improvised soap opera Die-Nasty, and has been a core member of the troupe since its founding in 1991. From 1995-1999, he co-hosted The Johnny and Poki Variety Hour at Edmonton's Varscona Theatre. His theatre credits include shows with Teatro la Quindicina, Panties Productions, and Rapid Fire Theatre. Film credits for Andersen include Purple Gas, Turnbuckle!, and Stray Dogs. He has written, directed and produced a number of independent films, including Rio Loco, Subplot, Subplot II and Hearts of Plastic.

In March 2026 he was being treated for leukemia.

== Other work ==
In 2005, Andersen exported the Die-Nasty company's annual Soap-A-Thon to England, working with legendary British theatre artist Ken Campbell to produce a 36-hour-long soap opera in London.

Several members of Campbell's company made the pilgrimage to Canada in 2006 and 2007 to take part in the original 53-hour-long event. In January 2008, Andersen returned to London (along with several members of the Die-Nasty troupe) to direct the 50-hour Improvathon at the People Show Studios. There, he worked with Adam Meggido, Oliver Senton, and Ruby Lake. He was joined by Canadian improvisors Mark Meer, Kory Mathewson, Matt Alden, Kurt Smeaton, Davina Stewart, Jamie Knifefight Cavanagh, and Belinda Cornish, as well as musical director Jan Randall.

Andersen is the recipient of a Dora Mavor Moore Award for co-writing the revue Not Based on Anything by Stephen King with Second City. He has been nominated for several Elizabeth Sterling Haynes Awards, and received the Sterling Award for Outstanding Fringe Production for co-writing and starring in the play Giant Ants.
