= Three Dead Trolls in a Baggie =

Canadian comedy group (1987–2005)

- Origin: Edmonton, Alberta, Canada
- Genres: Comedy
- Years active: 1987–2005
- Past members: Wes Borg; Joe Bird; Cathleen Rootsaert; Neil Grahn; Paul Mather; Jan Randall

The Three Dead Trolls in a Baggie were a Canadian musical and comedy group from Edmonton, Alberta, formed in 1987. Their credits include numerous stage productions, two television shows, and multiple albums.

The Trolls did sketch comedy, often on risqué or controversial subjects, along with humorous songs. One of their songs, "The Toronto Song" (which is often incorrectly attributed to The Arrogant Worms), makes fun of Ontario by insulting the city of Toronto, as well as all of Ontario, and eventually insulting the rest of the provinces except for Alberta. The Trolls also composed musical parodies of historical events such as the War of 1812, and Canada's 1999 division of Nunavut from the Northwest Territories; the song "Nunavut" opens with "We'll keep Canada... and you can have Nunavut!" (pronouncing it "None-of-it").

== History ==
Childhood friends Wes Borg and musician and actor Joe Bird met actress Cathleen Rootsaert at a Rapid Fire Theatre Theatresports comedy jam and formed the group. Neil Grahn was recruited later. Their name allegedly came from a restaurant where staff jokingly called triple hamburgers-to-go "Three Dead Trolls in a Baggie". They immediately began performing and, by 1991, were touring with a play they called Kevin Costner's Naked Butt.

This was followed the year after by another play called Saskatchebuzz, in which Saskatchewan declared itself independent and quickly became a world leader in marijuana production. It touched on multiple political debates of the era, including drug legalisation, farm subsidies, and Québec separatism. According to the Museum of Canadian Music, the "show garnered the group's most consistently positive reviews to date." Also in 1992, they released their debut album, Con Troupo Comedius. The Trolls caught the attention of CBC Television, which gave them a show. This was short-lived, however; it received mixed reviews and was cancelled after only five episodes.

In 1993, the CBC paid the group $60,000 to write 10 scripts for a possible new version of their show. The network then rejected the scripts. The Trolls were, in their own words, "stunned but not vanquished"; in reaction they "decided to make the damn things anyway." In April 1994, they produced the scripts, turning the stage at Edmonton's Roxy Theatre into a replica of a real CBC studio, "complete with coffee machines and applause signs".

Rootsaert and Grahn left the group in 1994, though Rootsaert continued to collaborate with them occasionally as a part-time member. Borg and Bird joined Atomic Improv and began collaborating with other Edmonton musicians and comedians, getting more and more into improv theatre. In 1995, The Trolls performed with the band Jr. Gone Wild at the Garneau Theatre in Edmonton and released the album Jr. Gone Wild & Three Dead Trolls In A Baggie – Live At The Hyperbole.

The Trolls cooperated with Atomic Improv in 1996 to produce The War of 1812, "a humorous retelling of the war of the same name replete with deliberately over-the-top pro-Canadian jingoism." The two-act play featured Bird and Borg, as well as Paul Mather and Donovan Workun from Atomic Improv. It debuted that June at the Varscona Theatre, and went on to appear at the Winnipeg, Edmonton, and finally Victoria Fringe festivals. The War of 1812 produced another of the group's most famous songs, "The White House Burned (The War of 1812)," which is also often misattributed to The Arrogant Worms. As a result of this production, Mather, a comedy writer, joined The Trolls as a full-time member, the first since the original lineup. Mather also continued to be a member of Atomic Improv. Around this time, the group began to focus on releasing their songs and skits, mainly by selling CDs online or providing free downloads for fans.

In 1999, The Trolls collaborated with the queer comedy troupe Guys in Disguise on a fringe play, Piledriver!, based on the true story of a group of gay professional wrestlers who toured through the (majority-conservative) Canadian prairies in the 1970s. It did so well at that year's Edmonton and Winnipeg Fringe festivals, that The Trolls and GiD went on to develop it into a full length, two-act play in order to do a national tour the following year. According to the Museum of Canadian Music, Piledriver! was perhaps The Trolls' most popular show of this period; as with prior successes, it "underlay[s] a humorous narrative with commentary on serious issues." In a 1999 article recommending shows to see at that year's festival, an Edmonton Journal reviewer called the show "exuberantly wacky, fun, and Fringey" and said audiences would "love Piledriver! [...] for its glee, its insurrectionist spirit, and its heart."

Grahn returned and he and Borg hosted The Geek Show which aired on Canadian Learning Television, BookTelevision, and Access in 2004-2005. The show was about "what's funny on the Internet", with the idea being to "invite the audience over to Wes' house and take a look at funny websites." Fitting this theme, it was taped in Borg's living room in Edmonton, and featured him, Grahn, "a musician, and a studio audience of 3-4 (because that's all the couch can handle)". Live music for the show was provided by Second City veteran pianist and music director Jan Randall. Randall also functioned as a sidekick for Borg, who hosted. Borg, Bird, and Randall took on a number of gigs at this time billed as Three Dead Trolls in a Baggie, including the Seattle Comedy Festival in 2004. The trio performed "The White House Burned (The War of 1812)" in Seattle, "in front of real live Americans", fulfilling a long-stated aspiration.

By 2005, the group had broken up. Borg moved to Victoria, British Columbia, in 2007 and became a fixture in that city's entertainment scene. Mather moved to Toronto and wrote for Corner Gas, Little Mosque on the Prairie and the Rick Mercer Report. Rootsaert is an actor and director; Grahn is a writer and producer. Randall is now based in Victoria.

On April 1, 2009, Joe Bird died of a heart attack, at age 41. His life was celebrated annually at the Empress Pub in Edmonton, until it closed in 2020. Joe's songs are much loved by the Edmonton community, and musicians are working to ensure these songs are remembered.

== Discography ==
- Con Troupo Comedius, 1992, Independent
- The Geek Album, 2000, Independent
- An Unseasonably Yellow Xmas, 2000, Independent
- Steaming Pile of Skit, 2001, Independent
- The Geek Album 2.0, 2002, Independent
- Skit Happens, 2003, Independent
- Three Dead Trolls in a Baggie, unknown, Independent

=== Live albums ===
- Jr. Gone Wild & Three Dead Trolls In A Baggie – Live At The Hyperbole, 1995, Stony Plain Music
- Live @ The Hyperbole, 2000, Independent
