= Rapid Fire Theatre =

Improvisational theatre company

Coordinates: 53°31′8″N 113°29′47″W

Rapid Fire Theatre Company
- Genre: Improvisation/Sketch comedy
- Date of premiere: 1981
- Location: Edmonton, Alberta, Canada
- Official website

Rapid Fire Theatre (RFT) is an improvisational theatre company based in Edmonton, Alberta, Canada.

== History ==
The origins of the company stretch to 1981, when Edmonton's Theatre Network became the third company in the world to regularly produce Keith Johnstone's Theatresports. The Artistic Director of Theatre Network at the time, Stephen Heatley, brought the high-energy format to Edmonton, and eventually, performers from the show formed Rapid Fire Theatre, which officially became its own theatre company in 1988. Rapid Fire Theatre performed originally at the Phoenix Theatre in Downtown Edmonton until 1990 when it moved to The Chinook Theatre in Old Strathcona, which became the Varscona Theatre in 1994. Rapid Fire Theatre performed there until 2012, and was part of the Varscona Theatre Alliance, along with Teatro la Quindicina and Shadow Theatre. In September 2012, Rapid Fire Theatre moved back north of the river to Zeidler Hall at the Citadel Theatre complex, as announced by Maria Bamford. In 2013 Rapid Fire Theatre launched a capital campaign with the goal of building their own theatre.

=== Artistic Directors ===
- Stephen Heatley (Theatre Network)
- Jack Smith 1988–1991
- Patti Stiles 1991–1995
- Jacob Banigan 1995–2004
- Chris Craddock 2005–2009
- Kevin Gillese 2009–2010
- Amy Shostak 2010–2015
- Matt Schuurman 2015–Present

== Shows ==
RFT currently produces two weekly shows: Theatresports and the long form improv show Chimprov. Some members of Rapid Fire Theatre have produced or performed in sketch comedy shows. Other shows previously produced by RFT over the years have included Gorilla Theatre, Catch 23 and The 11:02 Show, as well as main stage productions like "On Being a Peon" and "The Critic", penned by RFT member Chris Craddock, as well as collaborative projects like “Fairytales Scratched” (Kevin Gillese & Arlen Konopaki), “A Watched Pot Never Boyles” (Amy Shostak & Arlen Konopaki), and “Kiss My Bus” (Amy Shostak, Kirsten Rasmussen, and Clarice Eckford). In 2011, Rapid Fire Theatre marked the 30th season of Theatresports in Edmonton with an Alumni Weekend.

== Improvaganza ==
RFT also hosts an annual international improvisation festival, Improvaganza, which brings improv artists from across the world together every June. The festival is partially funded by the Government of Canada.

=== Guests ===
Past guest artists at Improvaganza have included The Sunday Service, CRUMBS, Picnicface, The Pajama Men, Maria Bamford, Convoy (Upright Citizens Brigade), Neil Hamburger, Standards and Practices, Showstopper! The Improvised Musical, Moshe Kasher, Doppelganger, La Gata, The School of Night, Det Andre Teatret, Et Compagnie, Mantown, Dad's Garage Theatre Company, Die Gorillas, Iron Cobra, Loose Moose Theatre, Teater Narobov and Unexpected Productions.

=== Musical Guests ===
Musical guests have included The Magnificent Sevens, Gift of Gab, Mass Choir, Christian Hansen & The Autistics, The Famines, Doug Hoyer, Rah Rah, The Joe, Mikey Maybe, and Mitchmatic.

== Awards ==
Rapid Fire Theatre has received several awards, including a special Elizabeth Sterling Haynes Award for excellence in theatre. Rapid Fire was named Best Theatre Company by VUE Weekly readers in 2012, 2013, 2014 and 2015 as well as Edmonton's Favourite Live Theatre Company by the Edmonton Journal in 2014. In 2013, the company also won a Canadian Comedy Award for Best Comedy Short for Internet Search History Revealed.

== Touring ==
Members of the company have performed across the world, including multiple appearances at the Berlin International Improv Festival, The Wurzburger Improtheaterfestival, The Chicago Improv Festival (CIF), The Vancouver International Improv Festival (VIIF), The Winnipeg International Improv Festival (IF), The Canadian Comedy Award Showcases (Toronto), The St. Valentine’s Day Massacre Theatresports Tournament hosted by Vancouver Theatresports League, and the World Domination Theatresports Tournament presented annually in Atlanta by Dad's Garage Theatre Company.

== Performers ==
=== Current ===
Current performers at Rapid Fire Theatre include:

- Joleen Ballendine
- Paul Blinov
- Chris Borger
- Joey Lucius
- Gordie Lucius
- Kelly Turner
- Joe Vanderhelm
- Julian Faid
- Todd Houseman
- Kory Mathewson
- Marg Lawler
- Jessie McPhee
- Mark Meer
- Tim Mikula
- Matt Schuurman
- Syd Campbell
- Sarah Ormandy

=== Notable alumni ===
Players and alumni of Rapid Fire Theatre include:

- Dana Andersen
- Jacob Banigan
- Wes Borg
- Marty Chan
- Chris Craddock
- Josh Dean
- Nathan Fillion
- Kevin Gillese
- Paul Mather
- Ron Pederson
- Jan Randall
- Cathleen Rootsaert
- Patti Stiles
- Neil Grahn
- Donovan Workun
- Kirsten Rasmussen

== See also ==
- Improvisational theatre
