= Improvaganza =

Improvaganza may refer to:

- An annual international improvisation festival in Honolulu Hawaii called Improvaganza hosted by Garrick Paikai and On The Spot Improv Hawaii established in 2005. https://otsimprov.com/

https://www.honolulumagazine.com/something-to-see-improvaganza-x-hawaii-festival-of-improv/

- An annual international improvisation festival by Rapid Fire Theatre
- Drew Carey's Improv-A-Ganza, an improvisational comedy television program
