= Guys in Disguise =

Theatre company

Guys in Disguise is an independent queer theatre company based in Edmonton, Alberta. It was founded in 1987 by Darrin Hagen and Kevin Hendricks when they took their first show, Delusions of Grandeur, to the Edmonton Fringe.

Guys in Disguise is best known for comedic and drag-based shows and has been credited for "exposing the voices of the drag and queer community to a wider audience."

== Work ==
Guys in Disguise productions include many premieres, many of them Hagen collaborations with such playwrights as Chris Craddock, Trevor Schmidt, Dana Andersen. In recent years, Jason Hardwick joined the artistic team, followed by Jake Tkaczyk.

Guys in Disguise has been collaborating with Workshop West Theatre since 1991 to produce the Loud & Queer Cabaret, the first and largest queer performance festival in western Canada. This annual event serves as a platform to nurture emerging writers. Following a three-year break, the Cabaret made a comeback in November 2014 under the name "Let Me Be Perfectly Queer!" It featured a lineup of 25 performances over two nights, which included the premiere of a new film by Brad Fraser.

In 1996 their play The Edmonton Queen: The Final Voyage won the Sterling Award for Outstanding New Fringe Work and was subsequently published in book form by Brindle & Glass Publishing. The Edmonton Queen details Edmonton's underground drag scene in the 1980s.

Hagen was also director of the 2024 documentary film Pride vs. Prejudice: The Delwin Vriend Story, about the Delwin Vriend case, and served on the jury for the 2025 Dayne Ogilvie Prize.

== Influence ==
In 2021, a new exhibition at MacEwan University's John & Maggie Mitchell Art Gallery, "Dress & Escapism: Performance of Identity Through Drag and Burlesque Costume," featured the theatre company's mermaid tail costume, which first appeared in the Edmonton Fringe Festival parade in 1987.
