= Amber Nash =

American actress (born 1977)

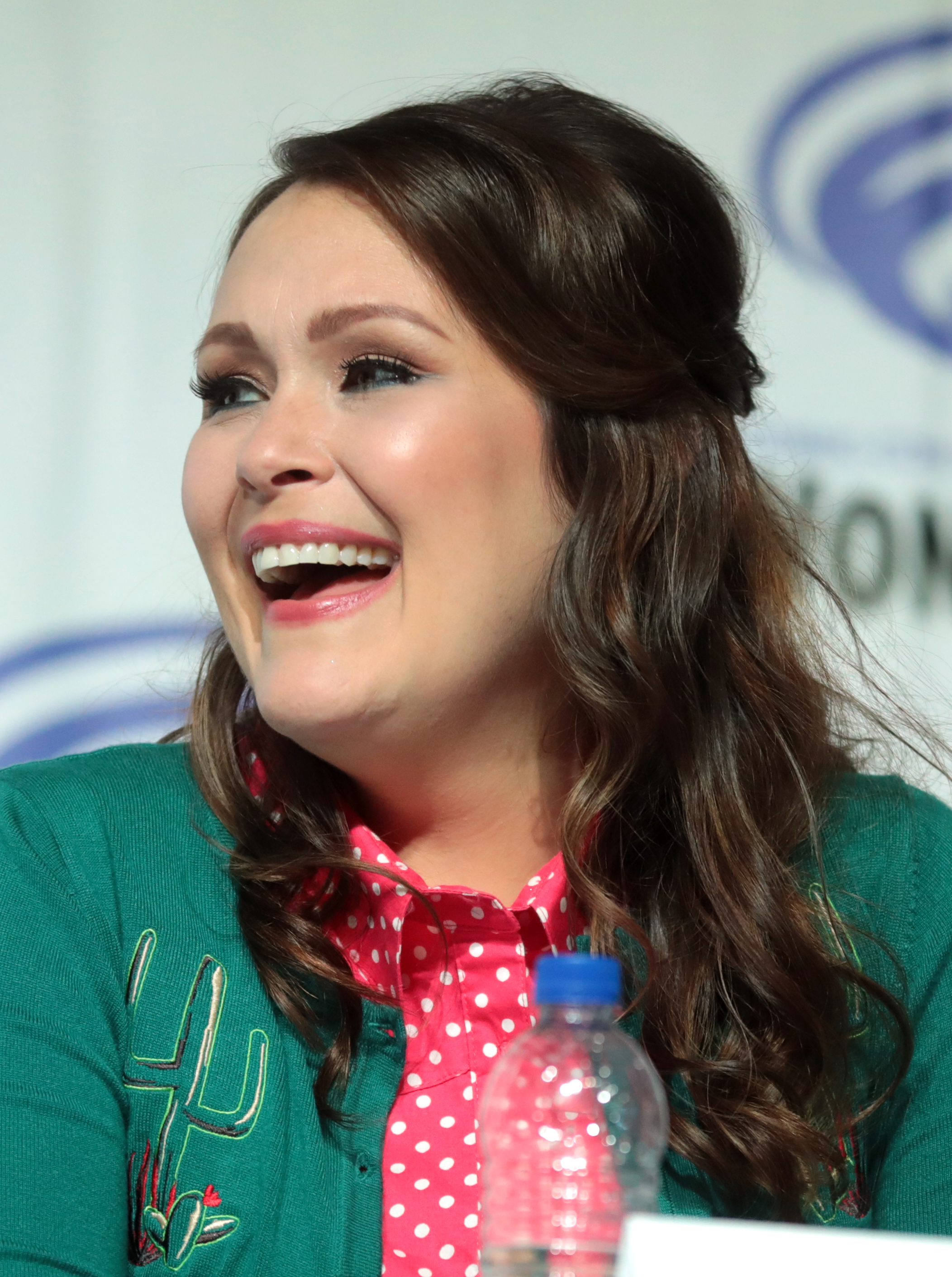
- Nash at the 2019 WonderCon.
- Born: June 6, 1977 (age 49)
- Occupations: Actress, comedian
- Years active: 2006–present
- Spouse: Kevin Gillese

Amber Nash (born June 6, 1977) is an American actress and improvisational comedian. She is known as the voice actress for Pam Poovey in the animated TV series Archer. She was also featured in the animated TV series Frisky Dingo.

== Early life and education ==
Nash graduated from Georgia State University and worked as a youth counselor before beginning her work as an actor and improvisor.

== Filmography ==
=== Film ===
Year	Title	Role	Notes
2017	Axis	Radio Host	Voice role
2021	America: The Motion Picture	Street Race Girl, Women's Rights Lady in Crowd, Anti-LGBTQ Rights Woman in Crowd	Voices
2023	How to Ruin the Holidays	Michelle	

=== Television ===
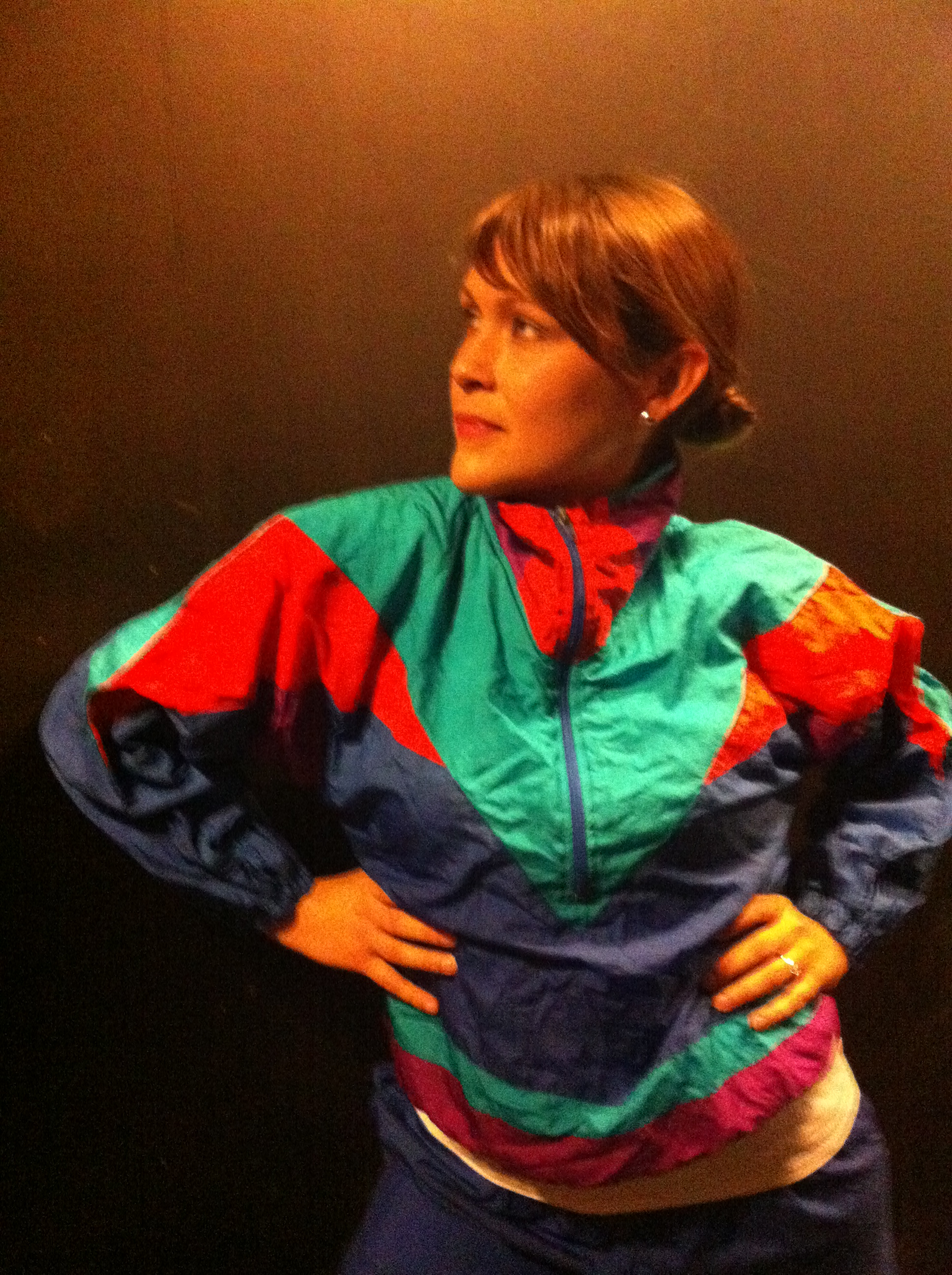
Nash in 2012

Year	Title	Role	Notes
2006–08	Frisky Dingo	Valerie, Hooker, other voices	14 episodes (voice roles)
2009–23	Archer	Pamela "Pam" Poovey	Main cast (voice role)
2010	Aqua Teen Hunger Force	Tabitha	Episode: "One Hundred" (voice role)
2016	Squidbillies	Prosperity	Episode: "Lipstick on a Squid" (voice role)
2017	Mr. Robot	Spokesperson	1 episode
2024	Dead Boy Detectives	Tabby Cat	2 episodes (voice role)

=== Theatre ===
- Catch 23 Atlanta
- The Doug Dank Project
- Improv Ensemble
- The Second City: Peach Drop, Stop and Roll at the Alliance Theatre

== Personal life ==
Nash is part of the Improv Ensemble at Dad's Garage Theater and The Laughing Matters. She is a co-founder of The Doug Dank Project at Push Push Theatre and part of the Catch 23.

Nash is married to improviser and actor Kevin Gillese with whom she regularly collaborates on comedic projects through Dad's Garage Theatre. She is vegan.

Nash is a member of the board of directors of Project Chimps, a sanctuary for former research chimpanzees funded in large part by the Humane Society of the United States.
