= Jesse Lipscombe =

Canadian actor

- Born: 1980 (age 45–46); West Edmonton, Alberta, Canada
- Occupation: Actor
- Spouse(s): Shannon Tyler (divorced); Julia LeConte Lipscombe
- Children: 3
- Awards: Rosie Award for Best Performance by an Alberta Actor
- Website: www.thelipscombe.com

Jesse Lipscombe (born 1980) is a Canadian actor. Best known for his role of Mance on Netflix's Black Summer and Coach Allen on My Life With the Walter Boys of the same streaming service. He won a Rosie Award for Best Performance by an Alberta Actor for his performance in the 2017 film, It's Not My Fault and I Don't Care Anyway. and was one of the executive producers of the sketch comedy show Tiny Plastic Men for which he was nominated for a Canadian Screen Award for Best Comedy Series at the 3rd Canadian Screen Awards. Lipscombe is also the founder of the #MakeitAwkward campaign, a hashtag movement in Edmonton that promotes anti-racism. He is an author with a Harper Collins published book, The Art of Doing and Jars, which was self-published by Friesen Press.

== Early life ==
Lipscombe was born in West Edmonton, Alberta to mother Monica (née Miles) Lipscombe and father Richard Lipscombe. He was raised in St. Albert.

== Controversy ==
In 2007, Lipscombe was disqualified from a high jump event and suspended from competition for 6 months for a doping violation, after testing positive for a prohibited substance.

In February 2018, Lipscombe held an event for the #MakeItAwkward campaign with the goal of having attendees develop the skills to stand up to racism and discrimination. The event was criticized as being non-inclusive regarding high ticket prices, misuse of city funds, and having the appearance of a non-profit, even though it was a private for-profit company.

Lipscombe operated GoldHunt with Chris Cromwell, a treasure hunt that had participants following clues to find $100,000 in and around the Edmonton area. In June 2020, the event was suspended and under investigation by the RCMP due to fraudulent activity.

In November 2022, Lipscombe was charged with aggravated assault against Rameen Peyrow, which allegedly occurred in May that year. In May 2023, the charge against Lipscombe was withdrawn.

== Personal life ==
Lipscombe is married to Julie LeConte Lipscombe. He was previously married to Shannon Tyler. He is the father of three sons. The first two sons, Chile and Tripp, he had with ex-wife Shannon; the third son, Indiana, he had with Julia. As of 2022, they reside in Vancouver, BC.

Lipscombe is also the grandson of Edmonton Eskimos football player Rollie Miles. He is nephew to the late Brett Miles and cousin to a Canadian rapper, Cadence Weapon.

== Select filmography ==
- Children of the Dust (1995)
- Resurrecting the Champ (2007)
- Lloyd the Conqueror (2011)
- Mutant World (2014)
- It's Not My Fault and I Don't Care Anyway (2017)
- #Roxy (2018)
- In Plainview (2018)
- Black Summer (2021)
- Jonesin' (2021)
