= Kevin Gillese =

Canadian actor, writer and improvisor

- Born: 24 December 1980 (age 45)
- Occupations: Actor, writer and improviser

Kevin Gillese (born 24 December 1980) is a Canadian actor, writer and improvisor from Edmonton, Alberta.

== Career ==
Gillese started as a performer with the improv company Rapid Fire Theatre and also works regularly with the Atomic Improv and performs annually at the Die-Nasty Soap-A-Thon. He was the Associate Artistic Director of Rapid Fire Theatre from 2005-2007, then Artistic Director until December 2009. In January 2010, Gillese began his term as Artistic Director of Dad's Garage Theatre Company in Atlanta, Georgia.

Gillese left college to take up improv. In 2004, he was nominated for an AMPIA award for best director for his first film Turnbuckle. He performed a spoken-word show "Wisdom Teeth" directed by Chris Craddock at the Edmonton International Fringe Festival in 2009 and hosted a cabaret night at the fringe with Amy Shostak.

Gillese has toured across Canada and internationally with the show Hip Hop 101, as well as with his improv show, Scratch, which played twice weekly in Edmonton when not touring. He appeared with Arlen Konopaki in Scratch at the New Zealand International Comedy Festival in 2008, and they toured Europe for six weeks at the end of 2009. In 2010, they wrote "Fairy Tales Scratched", a modern surreal take on fairy tales.

Gillese is the co-writer, co-creator, and executive producer of the short series Hart of America. The series was a product of Gillese's long time collaboration with Arlen Konopaki, and was based on their long-form improv format developed through their show Scratch. Hart of America also stars his wife, Amber Nash. Additionally, Gillese co-wrote and directed the show Battle Space Wars, also based on his Scratch shows, in February 2015.

Gillese is known as an arts leader who promotes diversity initiatives in theatre, specifically those that empower women.

When Dad's Garage lost its long-term base in 2013, Gillese led the search for and acquisition of a new home for the company. The initiative coalesced around the renovation and rezoning of an old church. Part of the funding for the move and renovations was derived from a successful Crowdfunding campaign that mobilized Dad's Garage's fanbase and supporters.
