= Impro Melbourne =

Improvisational theatre company in the Australian city of Melbourne

Impro Melbourne is an improvisational theatre company in the Australian city of Melbourne. Formed by Russell Fletcher and Christine Keogh in 1996 it is now run by Artistic Director Katherine Weaver, General Manager Rik Brown and Committee. Impro Melbourne is an Incorporated Association.

Impro Melbourne is also one of many improvised theatre and comedy groups operating in the Melbourne area.

Since 1996, Impro Melbourne has expanded its activities to produce varied forms of theatre, all using improvisation as a base, alongside a programme of shows and workshops for schools. Impro Melbourne currently produces the popular Theatresports™, along with Keith Johnstone's two other competition formats Micetro and Gorilla Theatre. Impro Melbourne regularly performs formats from improvisation companies in North America and Canada, and has also developed and produced its own improvised formats, including long-form plays, often in a particular genre.

A 2006 interview with company member, Lliam Amor, noted that, "after a few years in the doldrums, improv is on the up and up again. Shows such as Thank God You're Here, Jim Henson's Puppets Uncensored and Whose Line Is It Anyway?, and local groups such as Spontaneous Broadway and Impro Sundae, have re-piqued the interest of audiences who evaporated after the glory years of the '80s, when Theatresports was celebrity studded, on TV, and selling out Hamer Hall. ".

Impro Melbourne has performed in theatres across the city of Melbourne, including Theatreworks, La Mama Theatre, Carlton Courthouse and Melbourne Town Hall, and has been a regular feature at the Melbourne International Comedy Festival.

As well as theatre performances Impro Melbourne has a programme of demonstration shows and workshops for secondary schools - including Theatresports™ workshops and performances, Impro Zone, and The Fairytale Cookbook - which tours the state through Regional Arts Victoria. Impro Melbourne also offers corporate training and entertainment.

The beginning of Impro Melbourne's 2011 artistic season saw the company move all productions to The Space, 3-5 Carlton Street, Prahran. The company then performed every Sunday night, with each show comprising two formats, the exception being the company's Theatresports™ season, which ran the entire evening.

Melbourne's Herald Sun newspaper has referred to Impro Melbourne's Celebrity Theatresports as, "an evening filled with improvised hilarity and incredible creativity." Other performances have been referred to as, "completely unplanned, unscripted and undeniably funny journey of games, scenes and songs," "displaying extraordinary mental and physical dexterity" and "a great show to bring your kids to."

== Artistic Directors ==
Name	Period
Geoff Wallis	1996-2003
Patti Stiles	2004-2009
Karl McConnell	2010-2011
Jason Geary	2012-2013
Patti Stiles and Katherine Weaver	2014-
