= Todd Babiak =

Canadian writer

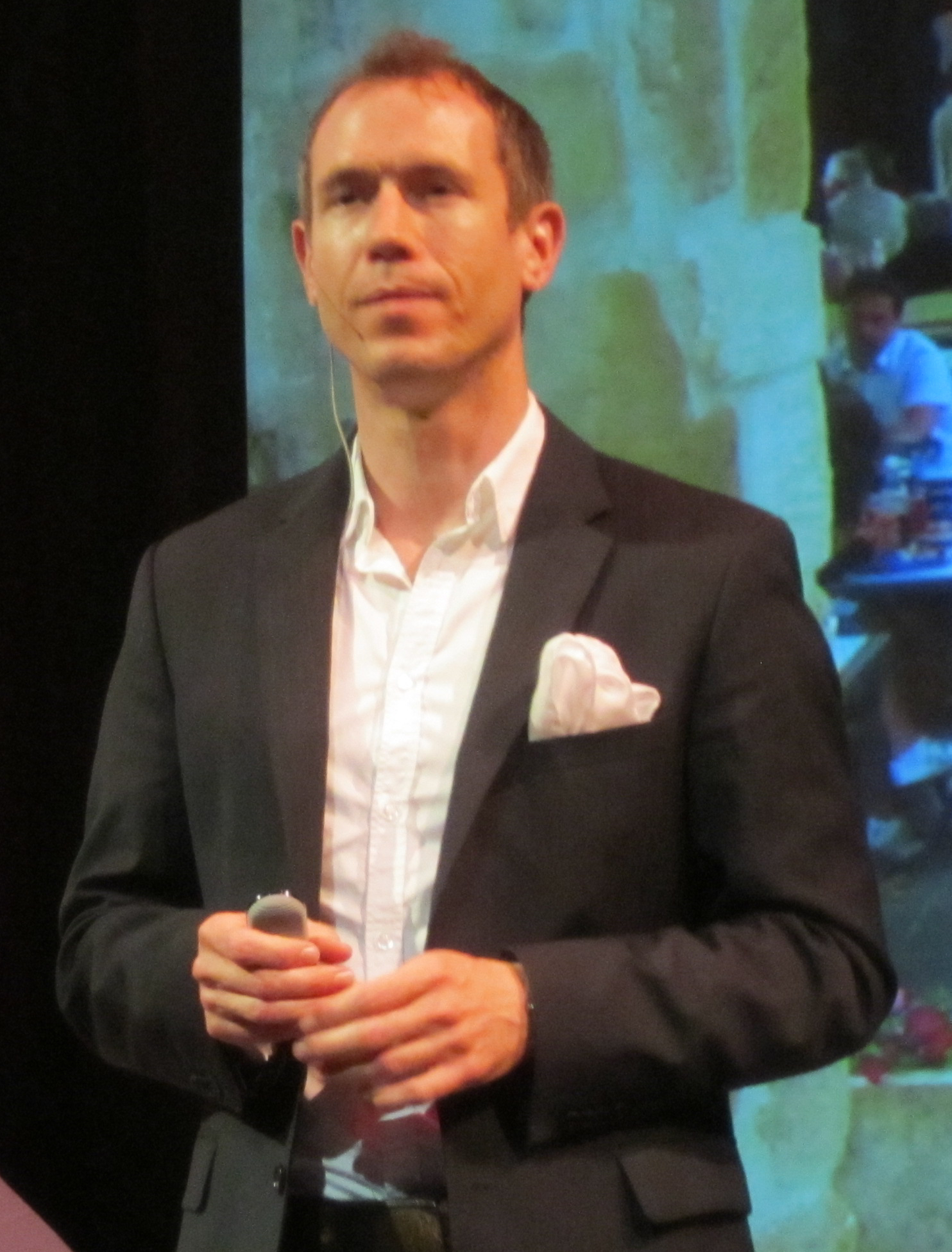
- Todd Babiak at TEDxEdmonton 2011
- Occupations: Entrepreneur, Novelist
- Writing career
- Language: English

Todd Babiak is a Canadian-Australian writer, entrepreneur, and place-brand strategist living on the Gold Coast.

== Career ==
He is CEO of Brand Gold Coast, a co-founder of Story Engine and Places are People, and has published several novels. His first novel, Choke Hold, was a finalist for the Rogers Writers' Trust Fiction Prize and a winner of the Henry Kreisel Award, and his second novel, The Garneau Block, was a longlisted nominee for the Scotiabank Giller Prize and won the City of Edmonton Book Prize. The Garneau Block was later adapted for the stage by Canadian actress and playwright Belinda Cornish, premiering in September 2021 at the Citadel Theatre, in Edmonton.

His fourth novel, Toby: A Man, was published by HarperCollins in January 2010. It was shortlisted for the Stephen Leacock Memorial Medal for Humour and won the Georges Bugnet Award for best work of fiction by an Alberta author. He was, for 10 years, a columnist at the Edmonton Journal.

Come Barbarians, his fifth novel, a literary thriller set in France, was published in late 2013 by HarperCollins. It was chosen as a 2013 Globe and Mail best book. Its sequel, Son of France: A Christopher Kruse Novel was published in 2016 by HarperCollins.

Babiak's novel The Empress of Idaho was published by McClelland and Stewart in 2019. It was republished as Monument in 2026.

In October 2021, McClelland and Stewart published Babiak's The Spirit's Up, in Canada and the United States. In 2026, What Gentlemen Do was published by McClelland and Stewart in Canada and the United States and by Text Publishing in Australia and New Zealand.

== Works ==
- Choke Hold (2000)
- The Garneau Block (2006)
- The Book of Stanley (2007)
- Toby: A Man (2010)
- Come Barbarians (2013)
- Son of France: A Christopher Kruse Novel (2016)
- The Empress of Idaho (2019)
- The Spirit's Up (2021)
- What Gentlemen Do (2026)
