= Josh Dean (actor) =

Canadian actor and improvisor

George Joshua Christian Dean (born December 3, 1979) is a Canadian actor and improvisor. He was born in Burnaby, British Columbia and raised in Edmonton, Alberta, where he performed in the improvised soap opera Die-Nasty and toured with improv company Rapid Fire Theatre.

== Career ==
Dean worked with the comedy troupe Gordon's Big Bald Head and appeared in several new works by Canadian playwright Stewart Lemoine. He was a regular cast member in the improvised variety show Oh Susanna! at the Varscona Theatre.

Dean provided the voice of Henpecked Hou (among others) in the game Jade Empire from BioWare Corp. He later appeared in several roles in Bioware's Mass Effect. In 2003, he co-starred in the independent film Purple Gas, and in 2006 starred in the FOX TV sitcom Free Ride. Dean stars in the Martin Gero film Young People Fucking, and National Lampoon's Bag Boy. Dean portrayed art restorer and hacker Boston Arliss Crab on the NBC show Blindspot 2015-2020.

== Personal life ==
Dean is an avid table top player. He is married to actress Celina Dean and has two children.

== Filmography ==
=== Film ===
Year	Title	Role	Notes
2003	Purple Gas	Cole Peter	
2003	Turnbuckle	Rev. Peter Jackson	
2007	Young People Fucking	Andrew	
2007	National Lampoon's Bag Boy	Freddy	
2010	Father vs. Son	Grant Coletti	

=== Television ===
Year	Title	Role	Notes
2006	Free Ride	Nate Stahlings / Nate Dineen	6 episodes
2007	The Beast	Frank Hopper	Television film
2009	This Might Hurt	Dr. Ethan Malinow	Television film
2011	The Handlers	Tim	4 episodes
2012	Mike & Molly	Father Justin	2 episodes
2013	Wedding Band	Dennis	Episode: "99 Problems"
2015	Castle	Jim Kogut	2 episodes
2016	Uncle Buck	Peter	Episode: "Brother"
2016–2017	Con Man	Rico Java	4 episodes
2016–2020	Blindspot	Boston Arliss Crab	14 episodes
2018	My Perfect Romance	George	Television film
2018	Deception	Andy Faust	Episode: "The Unseen Hand"
2018	Christmas with a Prince	Jeff	Television film
2019	Art of Falling in Love	Nate	Television film
2019	Christmas with a Prince: Becoming Royal	Jeff	Television film
2020	Live from the 8th Dimension	Dr. Dolittle	Episode: "Roachie Rich"
2021	The Rookie	Todd Asher	Episode: "Sabotage"
2021	Christmas with a Prince: The Royal Baby	Jeff	Television film
2025	Quantum Leap	Josh Nally	2 episodes

=== Video games ===
Year	Title	Role
2003	Neverwinter Nights: Shadows of Undrentide	Ferron the Iron Golem
2003	Neverwinter Nights: Hordes of the Underdark	Ferron the Iron Golem
2005	Jade Empire	Various voices
2007	Mass Effect	Various voices
2009	Dragon Age: Origins	Pick
2010	Mass Effect 2	Various voices
2012	Mass Effect 3	Additional voices
2020	Spider-Man: Miles Morales	Additional voices
2021	Mass Effect Legendary Edition	Various voices
2021	Ratchet & Clank: Rift Apart	Mr. Fungi
2025	Date Everything!	I, Ronaldini
