= It's Not My Fault and I Don't Care Anyway =

- Directed by: Chris Craddock
- Written by: Chris Craddock
- Based on: Public Speaking by Chris Craddock
- Starring: Alan Thicke; Quinton Aaron; Leah Doz; Jesse Lipscombe
- Cinematography: John Spooner
- Edited by: Carey Komadina
- Music by: Mike Shields
- Production company: Mosaic Entertainment
- Distributed by: 108 Media
- Release date: January 1, 2017
- Running time: 96 minutes
- Country: Canada
- Language: English

It's Not My Fault and I Don't Care Anyway is a 2017 Canadian comedy-drama film written and directed by Chris Craddock and starring Alan Thicke, Quinton Aaron, Leah Doz and Jesse Lipscombe. The film is based on Craddock's one-man play, Public Speaking.

Thicke stars as Patrick Spencer, a self-help guru and public speaker whose philosophy of extreme selfishness is encapsulated by the mantra "It's not my fault and I don't care anyway". However, his attitude toward life is put to the test when his daughter Diana (Doz) is kidnapped and held for ransom by drug dealer Johnny Three Fingers (Jesse Lipscombe).

The film marked the penultimate film role of Alan Thicke, who died December 13, 2016. He received a posthumous Canadian Screen Award nomination for Best Lead Actor in a TV Drama Program or Limited Series at the 6th Canadian Screen Awards. Jesse Lipscombe won a Rosie Award for Best Performance by an Alberta Actor for his work in the film.

The film premiered at the Whistler Film Festival in 2016 before being distributed primarily through online streaming.

== Cast ==
- Alan Thicke as Patrick Spencer
- Quinton Aaron as Brian Calhoun
- Leah Doz as Diana Spencer
- Jesse Lipscombe as Johnny Three-Fingers
- Valerie Planche as Elizabeth Stone
- Reamonn Joshee as Smitty
- Kevin Hanchard as Edward
