= Free Ride (TV series) =

- Also known as: Freebirds
- Created by: Rob Roy Thomas
- Starring: Josh Dean; Dave Sheridan; Erin Cahill; Allan Havey; Loretta Fox
- Theme music composer: The 88
- Composer: Al Wolovitch
- Country of origin: United States
- Original language: English
- No. of seasons: 1
- No. of episodes: 6

Production
- Executive producers: Rob Roy Thomas; Michael Binkow; Joe Revello
- Producers: Gary Snoonian; Josh Dean
- Camera setup: Single-camera
- Running time: 30 minutes
- Production companies: Rob Roy Thomas Productions; Wild Jams Productions; Fox 21

Original release
- Network: Fox
- Release: March 1 – April 9, 2006

Free Ride is an American partially improvised sitcom that aired on Fox starring Josh Dean as Nate Stahlings, a recent college graduate re-adjusting to life at home with his parents in Johnson City, Missouri. The series premiered on Wednesday, March 1, 2006 at 9:30 pm and the rest of the series aired on Sunday.

== Cast ==
=== Main cast ===
- Josh Dean as Nate Stahlings
- Dave Sheridan as Mark Dove
- Erin Cahill as Amber Danwood
- Allan Havey as Bob Stahlings
- Loretta Fox as Margo Stahlings

=== Recurring cast ===
- Dan Wells as Steve Moss
- Kirby Heyborne as Dylan Hudney

== Episodes ==
| No. | Title | Directed by | Written by | Original release date | Prod. code |
|---|---|---|---|---|---|
| 1 | "Missouri Loves Company" | Rob Roy Thomas | Rob Roy Thomas | March 1, 2006 | 1SAB01 |
Nate Stahlings decides to move home after graduating from college in California, but finds surprises: his parents are now in therapy, his old room has been changed into his parents' gym, and could that strange guy at Kash Kutters become his new best friend?
| 2 | "Up the Aunty" | Rob Roy Thomas | Aaron Hilliard & Luke Del Tredici | March 12, 2006 | 1SAB03 |
Nate gets a job at a themed restaurant and then, with his co-worker, goes out on a double date with Dove and a family friend.
| 3 | "Colon Blow to the Head" | Rob Roy Thomas | Chris Cox & Matt Sloan | March 19, 2006 | 1SAB04 |
When Nate takes his dad to the hospital for a routine colonoscopy, the exam becomes a life-endangering ordeal for Bob and Margo.
| 4 | "Procrasti-Nating" | Rob Roy Thomas | Chris Cox & Matt Sloan | March 26, 2006 | 1SAB02 |
Forced by his parents to stop partying with Dove all night and get a job, Nate finds work at a construction site, but then goes berserk when he finds out the site is the future home of his crush Amber and her fiance Steve.
| 5 | "Amber Alert" | Rob Roy Thomas | Aaron Hilliard & Luke Del Tredici | April 2, 2006 | 1SAB05 |
Nate believes he finally found a way to get closer to Amber when he begins a friendship with her brother. Also, Nate's friend Dove enters a freestyle fighting tournament with only internet karate training at the gym.
| 6 | "Who Let the Nate Dog Out" | Rob Roy Thomas | Rob Roy Thomas | April 9, 2006 | 1SAB06 |
In the series finale, Nate's future is put at risk when he decides to help Amber look for her cat instead of going to his job interview in Kansas City. Also, Nate's parents have an odd way of making their marriage work.

== Reception ==
Common Sense Media gave the show 1 out of 5 stars.
