= Mark Meer =

Canadian actor

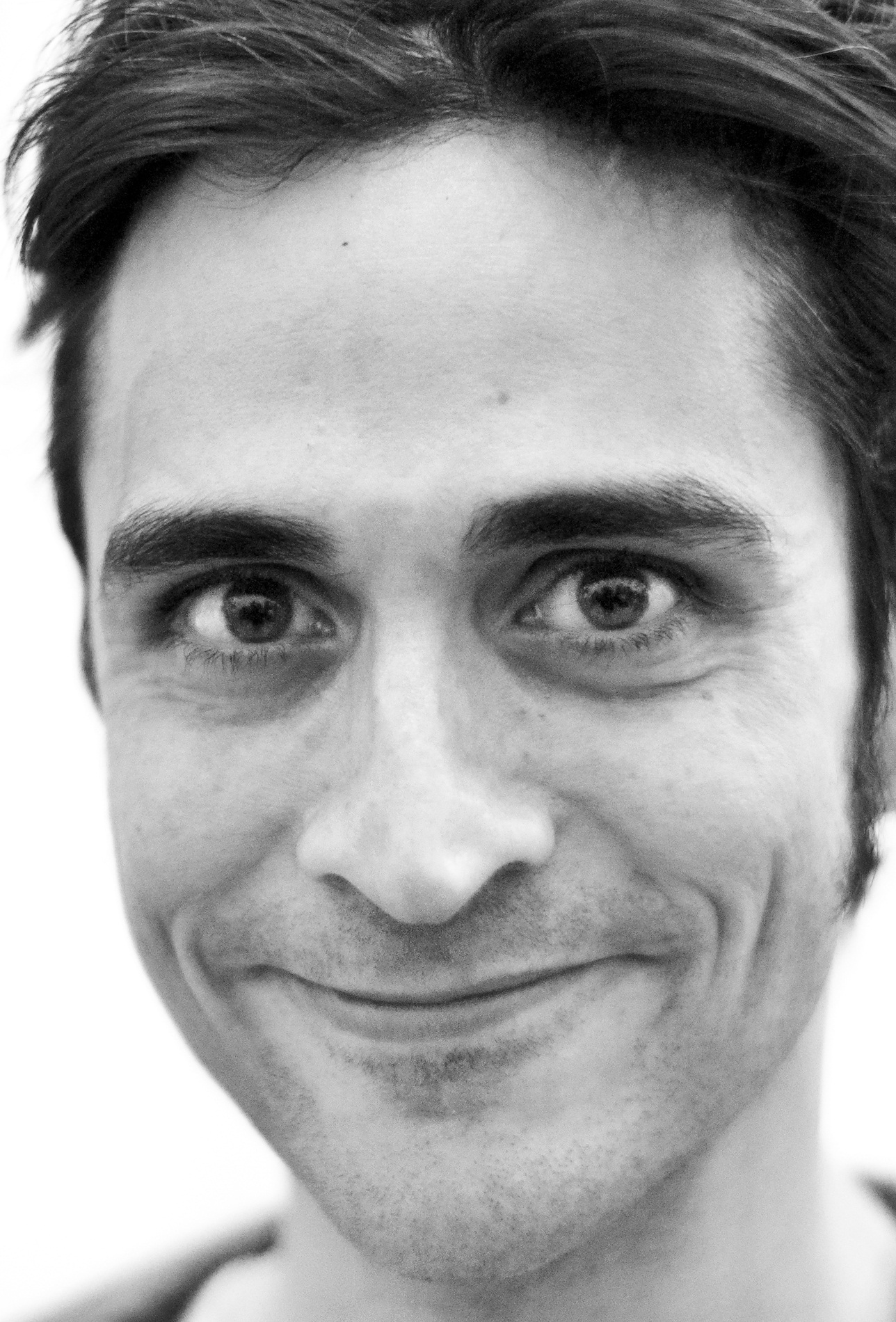
- Meer at the 50-Hour London Improvathon in 2011.
- Born: July 22, 1971 (age 55); Edmonton, Alberta, Canada
- Occupations: Actor, writer, improvisor
- Spouse: Belinda Cornish

Mark Meer is a Canadian actor, writer and improvisor, based in Edmonton, Alberta. He is known for his role in the Mass Effect trilogy, in which he stars as the voice of the player character, Commander Shepard. His voice is featured in a number of other games from BioWare Corp., notably the Baldur's Gate and Dragon Age series. Meer stars as the voice of the player character William Mackenzie in The Long Dark from Hinterland Studio. He also works in animation, providing the voice for several characters in a series of cartoon shorts produced by Rantdog Animation Studios, and the voice of Horse in the Captain Canuck web series starring Kris Holden-Ried and Tatiana Maslany.

== Career ==
Meer starred as the male voice of the main player character, Commander Shepard, in the Mass Effect trilogy. His voice is featured in a number of other games from BioWare Corp., notably the Baldur's Gate and Dragon Age series. Meer starred as the voice of the player character William Mackenzie in The Long Dark from Hinterland Studio, which also features his Mass Effect counterpart, Jennifer Hale.

Meer is a core company member of the Canadian Comedy Award-winning live improvised soap opera Die-Nasty, and was the first performer to complete the annual 53-hour long Die-Nasty Soap-A-Thon without sleep. He is a longtime member of Rapid Fire Theatre, a founder of the sketch comedy/improv troupe Gordon's Big Bald Head, and performs regularly at Edmonton's Varscona Theatre. He is a performer and writer on CBC Radio's sketch comedy program The Irrelevant Show and APTN's Caution: May Contain Nuts, and is a co-creator, writer and star of Super Channel's Tiny Plastic Men.

In 2005, Meer was nominated for an Elizabeth Sterling Haynes Award for co-writing the surreal sketch comedy show, Lobster Telephone (in which he also played Salvador Dalí), with the ladies of Panties Productions. In 2006, he was honored with the Sterling Award for Outstanding Performance By An Actor In A Supporting Role for playing multiple roles in Helen's Necklace, produced by Shadow Theatre. In 2011, he was nominated for five Canadian Comedy Awards, including Best Male Improvisor, for which he was also nominated in 2012, 2013, 2014, and 2015. In December 2012, Mark Meer was voted Edmontonian of the Year in an online poll held by Gig City, an Edmonton arts and entertainment website. Tiny Plastic Men, which Meer co-created and writes for Canada's Super Channel, has been nominated at the Canadian Screen Awards for Best Comedy Series in 2014, 2015, and 2016, and Meer himself was nominated for the CSA for Best Performance by an Actor in a Continuing Leading Comedic Role in 2015 for his work on the show. In 2016, Meer won the AMPIA Award for Best Performance by an Actor for the Tiny Plastic Men episode "Crisis on Infinite Octobers".

Meer appeared at Dragon*Con 2012 cosplaying as Commander Shepard, his most famous character. Though his attendance was not publicly advertised, some fans immediately recognized him.

In 2021, Meer became a player in The Black Dice Society, a Ravenloft themed Dungeons & Dragons actual play show on the official Wizards of the Coast channels.

== Personal life ==
Meer is married to Belinda Cornish, an actress who has done work in BioWare games as well, most notably voicing Rana Thanoptis in the Mass Effect series, and Goldanna and The Baroness in the Dragon Age series. Cornish also co-stars with Meer in Tiny Plastic Men, and been nominated for a Canadian Screen Award for her work on the show.

== Filmography ==
=== Film ===
Year	Title	Role	Notes
2003	Turnbuckle	The Electrocutioner	
2010	FUBAR 2	Car Salesman	

=== Television ===
Year	Title	Role	Notes
2010–2018	Caution: May Contain Nuts	Moonrod Mastertrick, Leonard the Vulcan, various	48 episodes
2012–2015	Tiny Plastic Men	October, various	32 episodes
2015	A Frosty Affair	Brad	Television film
2017	Legendary Myths: Raven Adventures	Raven (voice)	5 episodes

=== Video games ===
All roles listed are voice roles and for the English versions where applicable.

Title	Year	Role(s)	Notes
Baldur's Gate II: Shadows of Amn	2000	Bhaal Cleric	
Baldur's Gate II: Throne of Bhaal	2001	Cyric, additional roles	
Neverwinter Nights	2002	Orc Shaman, Balor Demon, additional roles	
Star Wars: Knights of the Old Republic	2003	Carth (demo only)	
Neverwinter Nights: Hordes of the Underdark	2003	Durnan, additional roles	
Jade Empire	2005	Zhong the Ox-Carrier, The Watcher, Lotus Assassin, additional roles	
Mass Effect	2007–2009	Commander Shepard (male), additional roles	
Dragon Age: Origins	2009	Athras, Gatekeeper, Werewolf, Unscrupulous Merchant, Pearl Dwarf Companion, additional roles	
Mass Effect 2	2010–2011	Commander Shepard (male), Niftu Cal, Vorcha, Prazza, additional roles	
Dragon Age: Origins – Awakening	2010	The Withered, The Lost, The First, The Herald, additional roles	
Dragon Age II	2011	Jethann, Hybris, additional roles	
Mass Effect 3	2012–2013	Commander Shepard (male), Blasto, Vorcha, additional roles	
Baldur's Gate: Enhanced Edition	2012	Rassad yn Bashir, Baeloth, Elan Garaq, Ghlouralk, Adoy, Goblin, additional roles	
Baldur's Gate II: Enhanced Edition	2013	Rassad yn Bashir, Baeloth, additional roles	
Dragon Age: Inquisition	2014	Cabot, Lyrium Merchant, Red Templar, additional voices	
The Long Dark	2015	William Mackenzie	
Baldur's Gate: Siege of Dragonspear	2016	Rassad yn Bashir, Baeloth, Volghiln, Adoy, Einar, Bertram, additional roles	
Slayaway Camp	2016	Skullface	
The Long Dark: Wintermute	2017	William Mackenzie	
Arcade Spirits	2019	Deco Nami	
Jupiter Hell	2019	The Protagonist	
Hyper-galactic Psychic Table Tennis 3000	2020	Paddles	
Raid Land	2020	Warrior/Bersker/Hunter/General Voice Effects	
Gotham Knights	2022	Starro	
Mythforce	2023	Deadalus	

=== Web shows and series ===
Title	Year	Role(s)	Notes
Star Trek Continues	2017	Sub-Commander Tal	Guest role; 2 episodes. A fan-made Star Trek web series.
Bucketheads: A Star Wars Story	2018	TK-683	Voice role. A fan-made Star Wars short.
L.A. By Night	2018–2019	Chaz Price	Guest role; 4 episodes. A Vampire: The Masquerade actual play show presented by Geek & Sundry and World of Darkness.
Game the Game	2019	Himself	Guest role; 2 episodes. A tabletop game play-through series presented by Geek & Sundry.
Stitch of Fate	2020–present	Max (of the Nosferatu clan)	Main role. A Vampire: The Masquerade actual play podcast presented by Pod by Night.
The Black Dice Society	2021	Brother Uriah Macawber, cleric of Ezra/ Azalin Rex (lich)	Main role. A Ravenloft themed Dungeons & Dragons actual play show presented by Wizards of the Coast.
Bucketheads: Season One	2021	Obran Gunn	Main role; 3 episodes. A fan-made Star Wars mini-series.
Champions Of The Realm	2022	Baeloth	Main role; 7 episodes. Limited series presented by Dungeons & Dragons, RealmSmith, and Lost Odyssey Events.
Bookshops of Arkham	2023	Keeper of Arcane Lore	Main role; 5 episodes. A Call of Cthulhu actual play podcast presented by Chaosium.
Gordon: A Batman Fan film	2023	The Joker	Main role; A fan-made Batman short by Creative Force Films.
Graveyards of Arkham	2024	Keeper of Arcane Lore	Main role; 6 episodes. A Call of Cthulhu actual play podcast presented by Chaosium.
Littlefoot	2027	Daddy Topps	Voice role; The Land Before Time fan film by Joey Lever, featuring the titular film protagonist.
