= Die-Nasty =

TV soap opera

Die-Nasty is a live improvised soap opera, running weekly in the city of Edmonton, Alberta, Canada since 1991. Die-Nasty's improv comedy format features a continuing storyline and recurring characters, live music, and a director who sets up scenes for the audience (and performers) in voiceover.

The current core cast of Die-Nasty features Caley Suliak, Cody Porter, Ellie Heath, Jason Hardwick, Jesse Gervais, Joel Taras, Kirsten Throndson, Kristi Hansen, Lindsey Walker, Nikki Hulowski, Peter Brown, Randy Brososky, Stephanie Wolfe, Tom Edwards plus a multitude of special guests from Edmonton and across Canada. Previous cast members include Delia Barnett, Belinda Cornish, Vincent Forcier, Wayne Jones, Mark Meer, Matt Alden, Dana Andersen, Shannon Blanchet, Leona Brausen, Chris Craddock, Jeff Haslam, Kory Mathewson, Chantal Perron, Cathleen Rootsaert, Sheri Somerville, Davina Stewart and Donovan Workun. Notable former cast members include Josh Dean, Nathan Fillion, Ron Pederson and Patti Stiles. In the course of its thirty five season run, Die-Nasty has welcomed many prominent guest stars, including Rachel Notley, Janis Irwin, Joe Flaherty, Mump and Smoot, Robin Duke, Mark McKinney, Alan Tudyk and Mike Myers.

Since 1993, Die-Nasty's home has been the Varscona Theatre, a busy live theatre and improv comedy hotspot in Edmonton's historic Old Strathcona district. The regular season show runs on Monday nights at 7:30pm, from mid-October until late May. The Die-Nasty company have also performed an annual mini-series at the world-renowned Edmonton International Fringe Festival every August since 1997.

Every September, Die-Nasty hosted the annual Soap-A-Thon — currently a 50-hour marathon of continuous improv, which features many performers, technical crew and volunteers going the entire weekend without sleep. The first Soap-A-Thon was held in 1993, originally at 48-hours, and was the company's first production in the Varscona. Each subsequent year, the running time increased until it topped out at 53-hours where it stayed for several years until the decision in 2010 to round the event to 50-hours. The current record holders for most performance hours at the Soap-A-Thon are core cast members Mark Meer and Patti Stiles. In 2005, then-director Dana Andersen exported the company's annual Soap-A-Thon to England, working with legendary British theatre artist Ken Campbell to produce a 36-hour-long soap opera in London. Several members of Campbell's company made the pilgrimage to Canada in the years 2006-2010 to take part in the original 53-hour-long event. Andersen paid further visits to London (along with several members of the Die-Nasty troupe) to direct 50-hour Improvathons (in 2008 and 2009 at the People Show Studios in 2010 at Hoxton Hall). The following February, Andersen and company returned for another 50 hour Improvathon in the same venue, produced by The Sticking Place in conjunction with Die-Nasty. In 2011, Mark Meer, Belinda Cornish, and Donovan Workun appeared in the London Improvathon at Hoxton Hall, directed by Adam Meggido.

Die-Nasty has been honoured with a special Elizabeth Sterling Haynes Award for Excellence in Theatre, and has also been nominated for several Canadian Comedy Awards. Their nomination in 2006 won Die-Nasty the Canadian Comedy Award for best improv troupe in the country. On February 12, 2007, the troupe received special recognition from the government of Alberta upon reaching the milestone 500th episode of Die-Nasty.

== Directors ==
- Jake Tkaczyk and Peter Brown 2022-present
- Janice MacDonald, Jason Hardwick 2021/22
- Vincent Forcier, Belinda Cornish, Peter Brown 2018/19
- Jeff Haslam 2012/13, 2016/17
- Cathleen Rootsaert 2010/11-2011/12, 2013/14-2015
- Dana Andersen 2001/02–2009/10, 2015/16
- Trevor Anderson 1996-2001
- Stewart Lemoine 1996-1998, 2021
- Ian Ferguson 1991-1996

== Musical directors ==
- Paul Morgan Donald 1992–present
- Jan Randall 1991, recurring 2008–2014

== Technical directors ==
- Olivia Bogaard 2024-present
- Brad "Five Arms" Fischer 1997–2020
- Brad Mitchell 1996-1997
- Jason Golinsky (SM) 1995-1996
- Jody Longworth 1991–1996
- Gorett V. 1991
- Terry Freestone 1991
- Chris Taylor 1991

== Producers ==
- Nicole Thibault 2009–present
- Chloe Chalmers 2001-2009
- Stewart Lemoine 1998-2001
- Tanya Hemmings 1991
- Ian Ferguson

== See also ==
- Improvisational theatre
