= Jan Randall =

Canadian musician (born 1952)

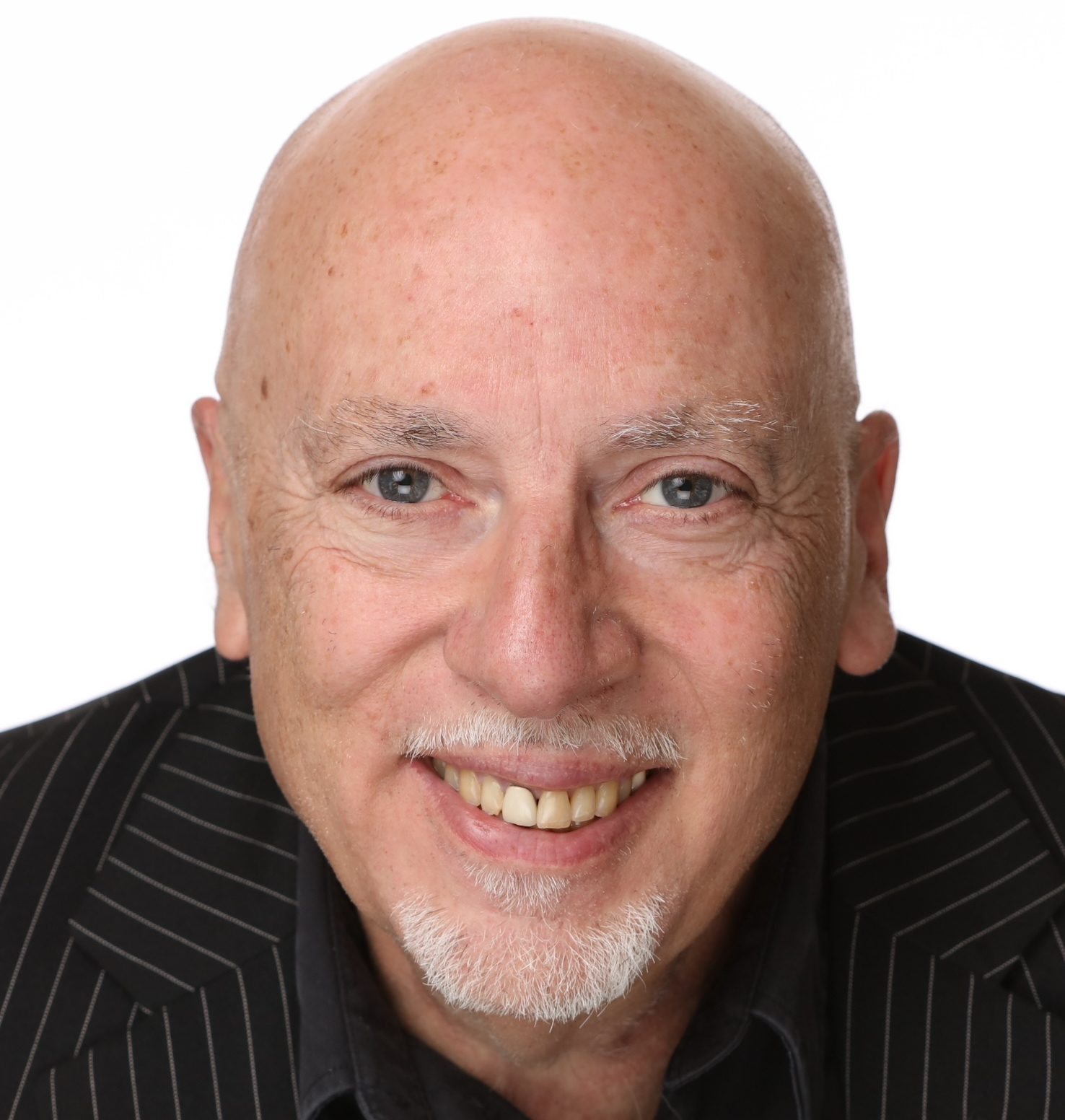
- Randall in 2024

Background information
- Born: July 26, 1952 (age 74)
- Genres: Folk; blues; jazz; classical music; soundtrack
- Occupations: Composer, singer-songwriter, musician, music director
- Instruments: Piano, Hammond B3 organ, guitar, bass guitar
- Years active: 1967–present
- Label: iTunesSpotify
- Website: www.janrandall.com

Jan Randall (born July 26, 1952) is a Canadian composer, singer songwriter and professional musician. He has had an extensive career composing sound tracks, performing original songs, and improvising music for comedy theatre. He is also known as a music director, teacher, and classical music composer. His original classical piano sheet music is available through his publishing company Vista Heights Music.

== Songs ==
His first solo concert was at Giuseppi's Pizza in January 1972, at the age of 19, in Edmonton, Alberta. Posters of many concerts he gave at folk clubs like the Hovel, Barricade Coffee House, Room at the Top are available to view online at the Edmonton Public library archive. Across Canada, he performed at the Regina Folk Festival in 1976 and around Toronto and Montreal after joining Second City Theatre in the early 1980s. In 1981 he joined the funk band Etcetera in Tampa Florida after meeting the guitarist Michael Marth who was playing a Vegas style show in Deerhurst Ontario. On returning to Edmonton the following year, he performed as a sideman for many local bands, including Amos Garrett.

Good Fair World (2008) was his first solo recording project which was followed with a world promotional tour that included LA, Memphis, New York, London, Berlin and Rome. His latest release of original songs, Wait in Line (2020) is available through Apple Music, SoundCloud and Spotify.

Randall composed and performed over 60 original comedy songs for CBC Radio's The Irrelevant Show (2012–2017) featuring parodies in the styles of Joni Mitchell, Prince, Cher, Luciano Paverotti, Loreena McKennitt, Johnny Cash, Leonard Cohen, Barry White, Frank Sinatra, and Elvis Presley. Popular songs from this series include an "operetta" about texting, Pavarotti doing his taxes, and Joni Mitchell complaining about Boxing Day sales.

He continues to write songs today that reflect his blues, jazz, folk and world music influences. His lyrics often have a dramatic narrative with a humorous or satirical undercurrent.

== Composer ==
In 1971, Randall passed an audition to begin music studies at the University of Alberta as a Theory and Composition major even though at the time he could not read music. He graduated in 1975 with a Bachelor of Music, majoring in theory and composition. His professors there included Violet Archer who studied with Bela Bartok. Other teachers of note included Malcolm Forsyth, Isobel Ralston, and Alexandra Munn. In 1976 he received a scholarship to attend the Banff School of Fine Arts, followed by jazz studies at Macewan University and North Texas State University.

In January 2014, he performed a classical piano concert of his original solo works at the McDougall United Church that included his "Piano Sonata No. 1" and a collection of Impromptus. In 2016, Randall and Ina Dykstra started Vista Heights Music, a sheet music publishing company featuring their original piano solos. The collection includes nine books distributed internationally through Debra Wanless Music, and Long and McQuade.

== Bands ==
His first professional band Manna was the coming together of three rival high school bands to play original roots based songs. The act was the first to be managed and recorded by Holger Petersen for Stony Plain Records first album "The Acme Sausage Company."(1970) Several months after graduation Manna joined a North American tour of songs from Jesus Christ Superstar that included performing two of their original songs with symphony orchestra. This included Cobo Hall with the Detroit Symphony for an estimated audience of 12000 people.

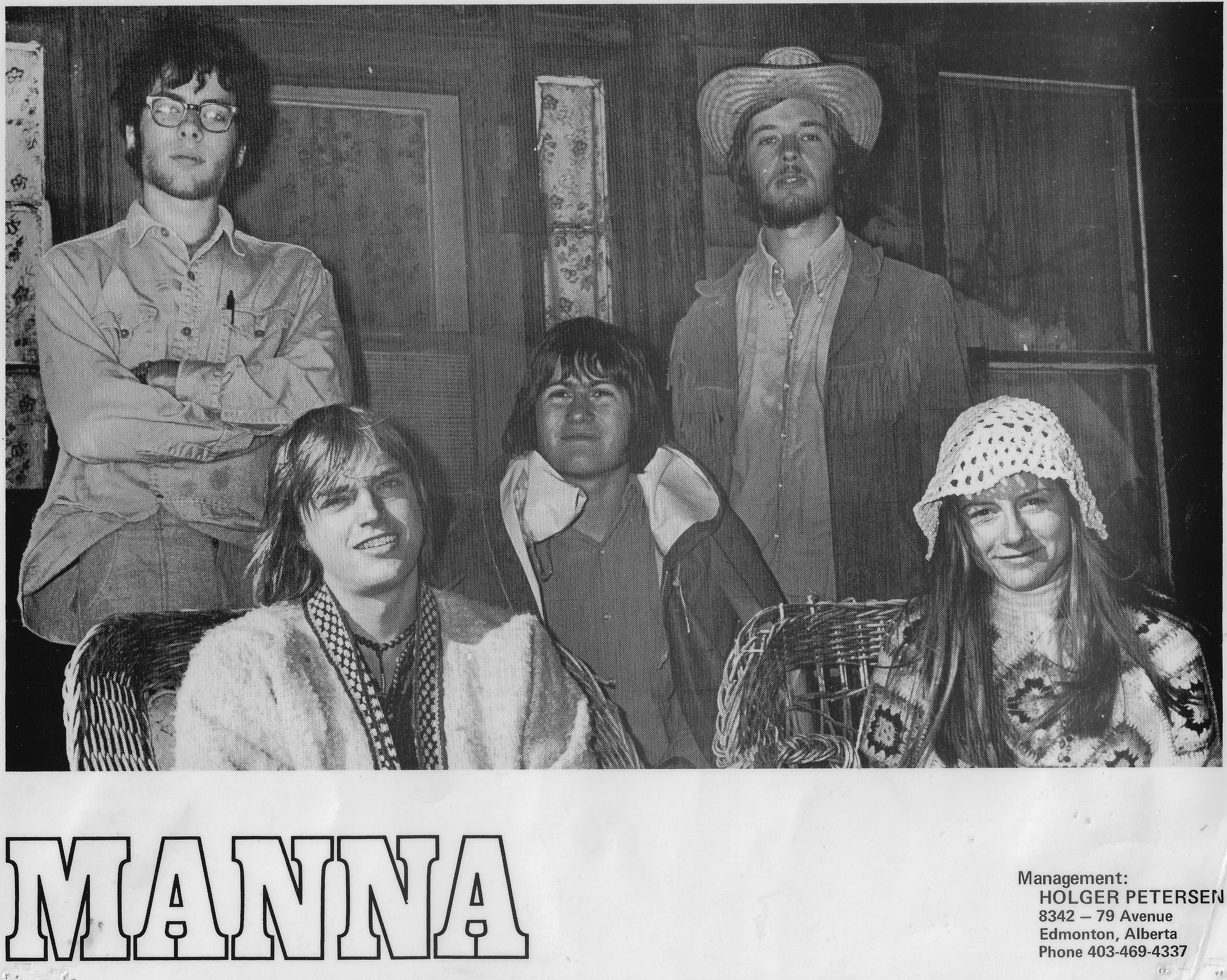
Manna left to right Jan Randall, Larry Reese, Chuck Carson, Tom Cairns, Bev Ross (1970)

Since then he has performed as a sideman with Bo Diddley, Otis Rush, Amos Garrett, Gaye Delorme, Dave Babcock, Sha Na Na, Spencer Davis, Sam Lay (drummer for Paul Butterfield and Howlin' Wolf) and Gary U.S. Bonds.

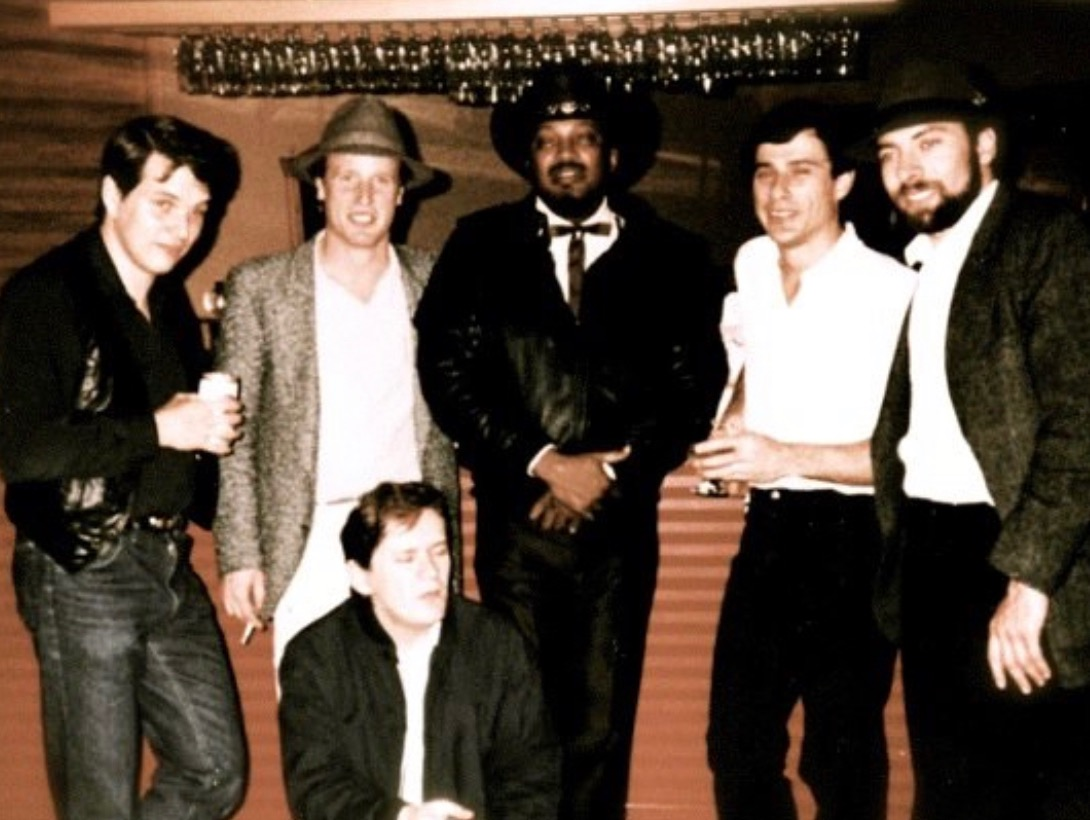
Left to Right Roger Brant, Rusty Reed, Otis Rush, Lindsey Umrysh, Jan Randall, Pete Bamford (kneeling), 1992

Recently, Randall was frontman for his blues band Rhythm Train, which evolved into the Boogie Woogie Dance Party with Steve Dubin (bass), Paul Wainwright (sax) and Jon Miller (drums). He continues to give concerts of his eclectic originals and performs stand-up comedy sets featuring his comedy songs.

== Film scores and broadcast ==
In 1985, he built a recording studio, Randall's Recordings, specifically for film and television music production. The studio has garnered over 700 broadcast production credits. In 1998, he won a Rosie Award for Best Composer/Musical Score for the NFB production, Lost Over Burma, which featured narration by Christopher Plummer.

He composed music for many other documentaries for the NFB, a large body of educational programs for ACCESS, and music to underscore a decade of award-winning productions for Karvonen Films and the Discovery Channel.

In 2006, Randall began work as a radio host on CKUA radio with the Weekend Breakfast show which he produced until 2009.

== Music for stage ==
Stage works by Randall include A Midsummer Night's Ice Dream (1992) which was a commission to compose a ballet for the National Ice Theatre of Canada. It won a sterling award for Outstanding Fringe Experience. Tangled Ice Webs followed in 1998, after which came the third ballet Poetry in Motion (2006).

Randall has been the music director for the annual Banff World Television Festival (1995–2007) and performed there with many stars including John Cleese, Bob Newhart, Dame Edna Everage, Martin Short, Steve Allen, and Kelsey Grammer.

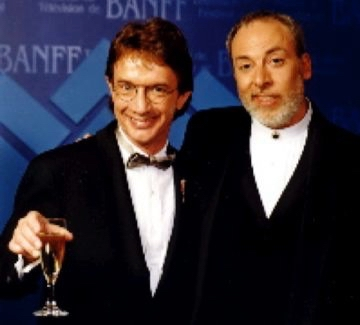
Randall with Martin Short at the Banff World Television Festival

He was also the music director and Composer for both the 1996 World Figure Skating Championships, and the 2001 IAAF World Championships in Athletics. The track and field event was broadcast to an estimated four billion viewers in over 200 countries and featured 45000 dancers, the Edmonton Symphony Orchestra, 80 drummers, and the recruiting of a one thousand voice choir.

== Music director/comedy improvisor ==
Randall has been music director, pianist, composer and music improvisor for many theatrical comedy troupes.

His work in comedy began in the 1980s in Edmonton, Toronto, and Santa Monica collaborating with The Second City. His first show for them was directed by Catherine O'Hara, and he later worked with Robin Duke, Ron James, Debra McGrath, Richard Kind, Bruce Pirrie, Sandy Belkovske, and Mike Myers. He also appeared on SCTV as a Turkish border guard in the scene "The Midnight Express" where Eugene Levy and Tony Rosato play Abbott and Costello smuggling hashish. While in Santa Monica, he house sat for Ryan Stiles who was recording his first "Whose Line Is It" series in England.

Other comedy troupes Randall collaborated and performed with include Rapid Fire Theatre, and Theatresports. He was the founding music director for Die-Nasty in the early 1990s and appeared with them off and on at the Varscona Theatre and as part of the Edmonton International Fringe Festival for over 20 years. He also performed with them in London, England, in 2009 and played piano continuously for 50 straight hours as part of an improvisation marathon produced by The Sticking Place. He repeated this the following year at Hoxton Hall with the same group. Today he is actively involved in the comedy improv and standup comedy scene in Victoria.

== Music teacher ==
From 2014 to 2024, he taught music history at the University of Victoria and has offered courses in Blues, Jazz, Boogie Woogie Piano, Joni Mitchell, Leonard Cohen, Billie Holiday, Gordon Lightfoot Buffy Saint-Marie and Ella Fitzgerald.

== Discography ==
- Good Fair World (2008)
- Wait in Line (2020)

== Television soundtracks ==
- Lost Over Burma (National Film Board of Canada/ news documentary)
- Wilderness Journeys (Discovery Channel/nature series)
- Geek TV (ACCESS/comedy series)
- Naked Frailties (drama/feature film)
- Purple Gas (comedy/ feature film)

== See also ==
- Music of Canada
- List of Canadian composers
- Arlo Guthrie
- The Second City
- Second City Television
