= Dad's Garage Theatre Company =

Coordinates: 33.7532°N 84.3687°W

Dad's Garage Theatre Company, located at 569 Ezzard St. in the Old Fourth Ward in Atlanta, Georgia, was founded in 1995 by Chris Blair, Marc Cram, Sean Daniels, George Faughnan, John Gregorio, David Keeton, Joseph Limbaugh, Matt Stanton, and Matt Young. A second wave of people in the founding summer soon followed, and the theatre company spent the next five years establishing itself in the Atlanta improv and theatre communities. The small theater company has since achieved international recognition for original stage productions and Improvisational comedy. Jon Carr is the Artistic Director, Tim Stoltenberg is the Creative Director, and Katie Pelkey is the Managing Director.

== History ==
On June 23, 1995, Dad's Garage opened its doors at 280 Elizabeth St., a building which formerly housed celebrated theater company Actor's Express, with the comedy play Fun With Science. The company then produced the regional premiere of Eric Bogosian's subUrbia in 1996, followed by an adaptation of Cannibal! The Musical by Trey Parker and Matt Stone in the fall of 1998, a production considered a breakthrough moment for the theatre company in the Atlanta arts scene. Graham Chapman's O Happy Day had its world premiere at Dad's Garage in 2000, followed by Chapman's Out of The Trees in 2001. In 2002, Dad's Garage produced a play by Chicago's Neo-Futurists, 43 Plays for 43 Presidents, which was attended by former president and First Lady Jimmy and Rosalynn Carter.

In the early and mid-2000s, Dad's Garage produced original new works, including premieres of several plays by Steve Yockey, during his time as Marketing Director. In the late 2000s, the company started shifting to creating original scripted works and improv, while adopting a democratic system of preparing projects for season planning, though external scripts were still occasionally produced. In the fall of 2010, Dad's Garage secured permission to produce Two Gentlemen of Lebowski, an Elizabethan adaptation of the Coen brothers' film.

A video producing wing, Dad's Garage TV (DGTV), was established in 2011 and continues to produce shorts and web series. In 2013, the property where Dad's Garage rented their theatre went up for sale, and the company began a two-year period of producing without their own facility. With all its property in storage, the company rented performance space at 7 Stages Theatre, Fabrefaction Theatre (now Brady Street Theatre), and The Alliance Theatre’s Hertz Stage. Dad's Garage led a very successful fundraising campaign to purchase and renovate an old church that went up for sale when its congregation outgrew the space. The new Dad's Garage Theatre on Ezzard St. opened its doors on December 31, 2015. Over the following five years, Dad's Garage continued to produce scripted and improvised plays year-round, as well as expanded its educational offerings with Improv Classes for adults and the creation of a Youth Program for Improv.

In January 2020, Dad's Garage artistic leadership changed hands when Artistic Director Kevin Gillese transitioned to Executive Producer for DGTV, and Ensemble Member and Playwright Jon Carr was hired as the new Artistic Director following a national search. Most recently, Dad's Garage responded to shutdowns due to the COVID-19 global pandemic by pivoting to live streaming content online.

== People ==
=== Founders ===
- Chris Blair
- Marc Cram
- Sean Daniels
- John Gregorio
- George Faughnan
- David Keeton
- Joseph Limbaugh
- Matt Stanton
- Matt Young

=== Directors ===
==== Artistic Directors ====
- Matt Young 1995-1996
- Matt Stanton 1996-1997
- Sean Daniels 1997-2004
- Scott Warren, Interim 2004-2005
- Kate Warner 2005-2009
- Scott Warren, Interim 2009
- Kevin Gillese 2009–2019
- Jon Carr 2019–2020
- Tim Stoltenberg 2020–2024
- Jon Carr 2024-present

==== Improv Directors ====
- Matt Young 1995-1996
- Joseph Limbaugh 1996-1999
- Chris Blair
- Tim Stoltenberg
- Dan Triandiflou

==== Past Associate Artistic Directors ====
- Dan Triandiflou
- Amber Nash
- Rene Dellefont
- Matt Horgan
- Ed Morgan

==== Special Guests ====
Dad's Garage has been host to many celebrity guest improvisers including: Colin Mochrie, Mark Meer, Kevin McDonald, Aisha Tyler, Tim Meadows, Henry Zebrowski, Dave Foley, Phil LaMarr, Thomas Middleditch, Ben Schwartz, Fred Willard, Matt Jones, Scott Adsit, Manon Mathews, David Harbour, Nick Kroll, and Cedric Yarbrough

== Improvisational Comedy ==
Dad's Garage is a Theatresports franchise, its original ensemble having trained with Keith Johnstone, author of Impro: Improvisation and the Theatre and Impro for Storytellers.

Other formats developed at Dad's Garage include the longform shows Murder She Improvised, Scandal!, B.R.A.W.L., Improv D&D, Cage Match, Dice Of Destiny, Improv Idol, Madmen & Poets, Dark Side Of The Room, and Wowee Zowee (an improvised children's show).

== Programming ==
=== DGTV ===
==== Productions ====
- Rusty Trombone
- High Fructose Corn Sizzurp
- Up on the Rooftop
- Movers
- Hart of America
- Cinco de Mayo
- That Was Awesome
- The Garage

=== Twitch ===
In March 2020, Dad's Garage temporarily closed to the public for safety concerns due to the COVID-19 global pandemic and pivoted their programming to streaming online via Twitch.

== Awards ==
Dad's Garage has won numerous awards over the years, including multiple wins as Creative Loafing's Best Theater and Best Improv Group in Atlanta.
