= Tiny Plastic Men =

Canadian television comedy series

- Genre: Sketch comedy
- Starring: Mark Meer; Chris Craddock; Matt Alden; Belinda Cornish
- Country of origin: Canada
- No. of seasons: 4
- No. of episodes: 32

Original release
- Network: Super Channel
- Release: December 3, 2012 – present

Tiny Plastic Men is a Canadian television comedy series, which premiered on Super Channel in 2012. Produced in Edmonton, Alberta, the series stars Mark Meer, Chris Craddock and Matt Alden as three employees in the testing department of the Gottfried Brothers toy company, and Belinda Cornish as their boss Alexandra.

The series has garnered three Canadian Screen Award nominations for Best Comedy Series, at the 2nd Canadian Screen Awards in 2014, the 3rd Canadian Screen Awards in 2015 and the 4th Canadian Screen Awards in 2016. Tiny Plastic Men has also been nominated for several Canadian Comedy Awards, including Best TV Show in 2015.

It is not confirmed, but this show may be cancelled. Upon contacting Mark Meer, he simply said "We do not plan to create any new episodes at the time."
