= Project Chimps =

Animal sanctuary in Morganton, Georgia, United States

Project Chimps is an American privately funded 501(c)(3) nonprofit animal sanctuary for chimpanzees formerly used in research. It will eventually house 150 chimpanzees on an over 230 acre property in the Blue Ridge Mountains in Morganton, Georgia. Project Chimps is accredited by the Global Federation of Animal Sanctuaries.

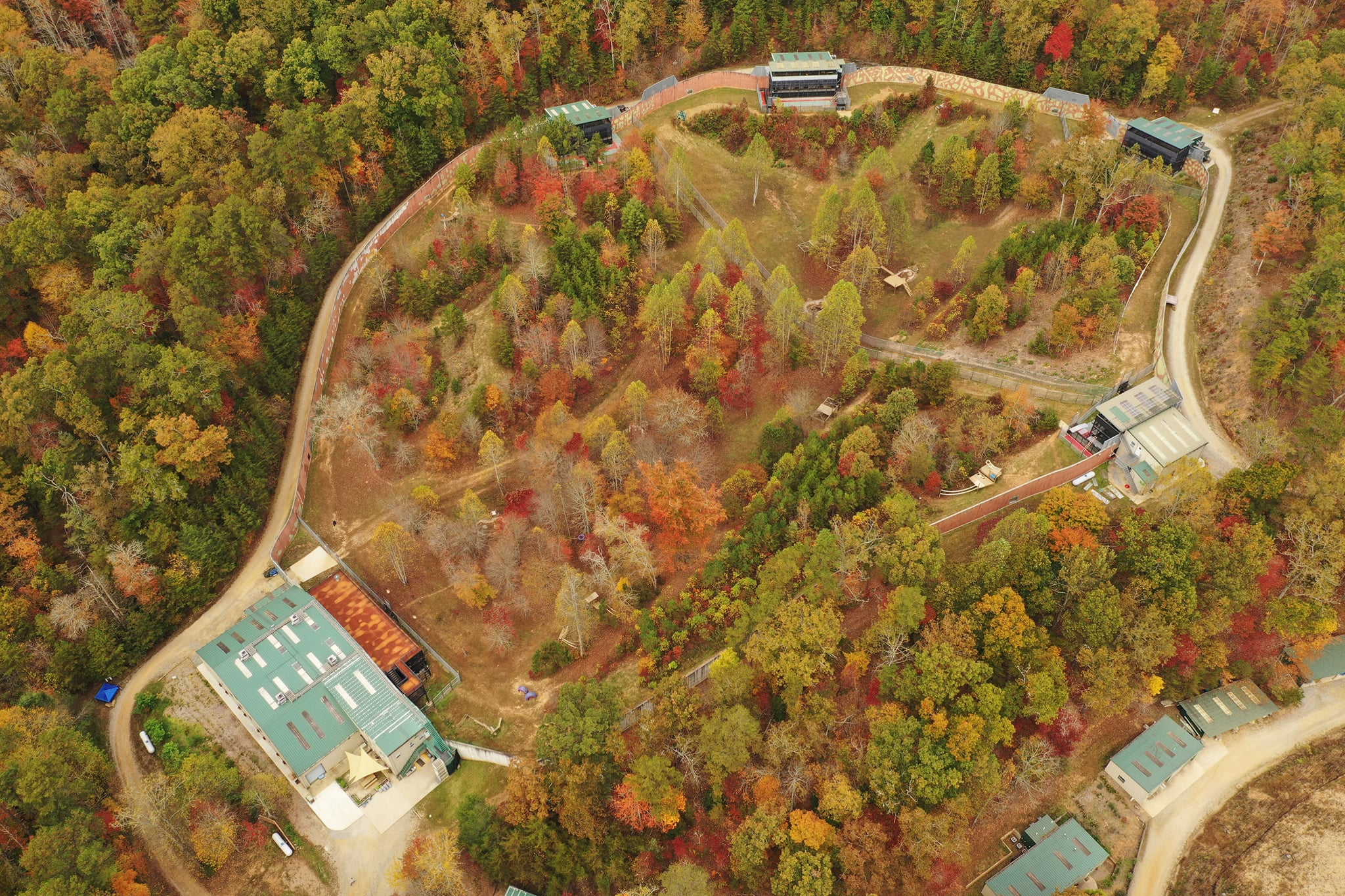
Peachtree Habitat where up to the first 100 chimpanzees will reside.

== History ==
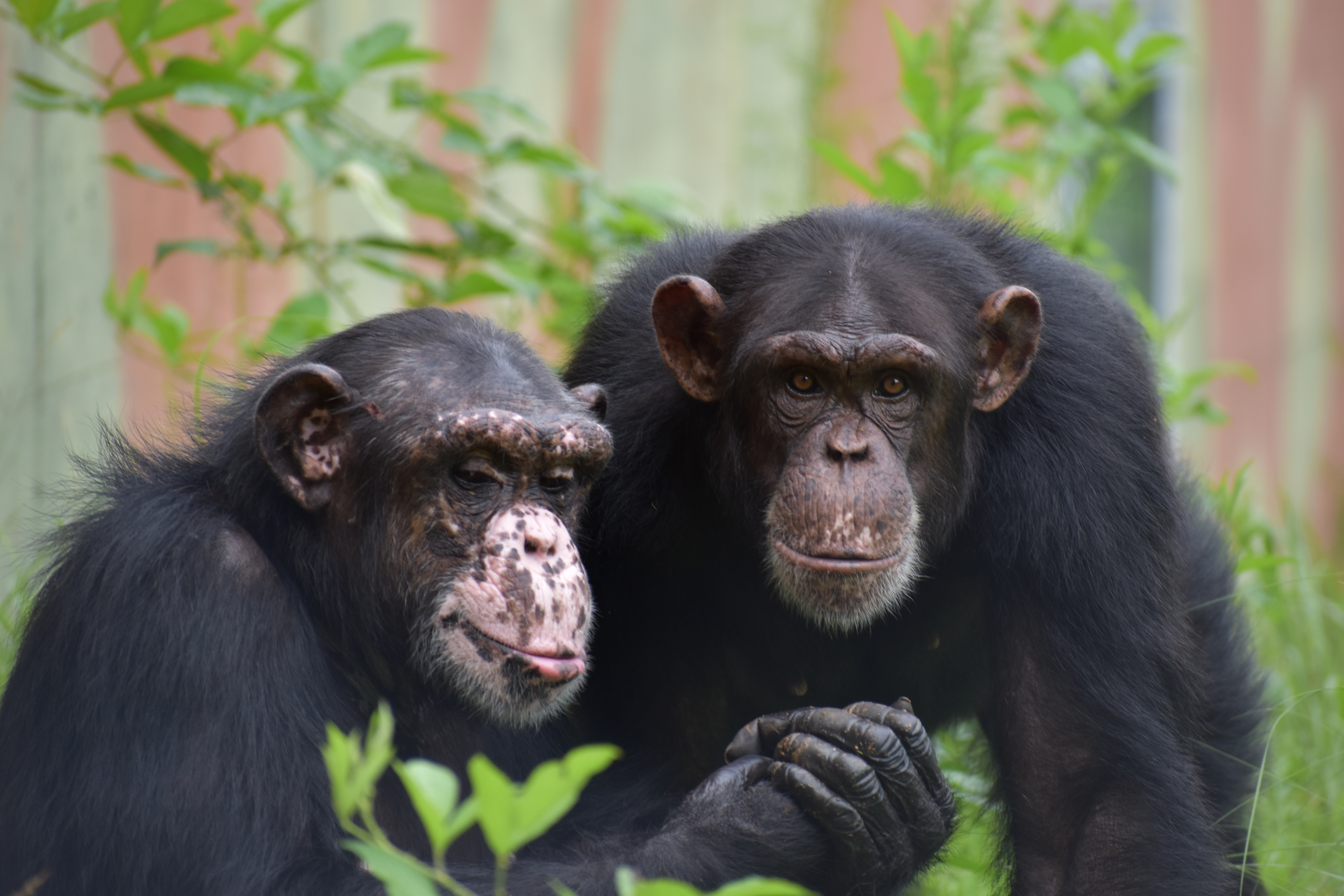
Harriett and Lucky

In addition to their use as pets and entertainers, captive chimpanzees have been used as subjects for scientific research. Anticipating that medical research on chimpanzees would be key to understanding diseases, such as hepatitis, the United States government and private laboratories embarked on chimpanzee breeding programs in the 1980s. A decade later, the experimental use of chimpanzees declined, resulting in a surplus population of captive chimpanzees.

The significant cost of caring for the approximately 700 privately owned chimpanzees housed in U.S. research facilities required the development of alternatives to standard laboratory housing for chimpanzees no longer active in research. Concurrent with the plight of research chimpanzees, hundreds of privately owned chimpanzees who proved unmanageable to keep as pets or performers were also in need of a professionally run facility; a sanctuary.

Project Chimps was founded in 2014 following the end of National Institutes of Health funding for biomedical research on chimpanzees. The sanctuary occupies land originally occupied by a gorilla sanctuary funded by software mogul C. E. Steuart Dewar and Jane, his wife at the time. Project Chimps bought the land for about $1.6 million; the Dewar Wildlife Trust donated the facilities. The sanctuary is intended to house more than 150 animals including the retired research chimpanzees at the New Iberia Research Center in New Iberia, Louisiana. The facility includes office buildings, a veterinary clinic, and several buildings that house 10 to 15 chimpanzees each.

== Present day ==
The mission of Project Chimps is "to provide lifelong exemplary care to chimpanzees retired from research". To fulfill its mission of assisting these endangered nonhuman primates, Project Chimps has established several public education programs including Discovery Days and Chimpcation, The sanctuary also hosts veterinary, behavioral, animal care and organizational development interns throughout the year. Ali Crumpacker was hired as the executive director in 2017. In 2025, Project Chimps published a 5-year Strategic Plan to expand the facility and accommodate many of the remaining chimpanzees still living at the New Iberia Research Center.

The chimpanzees receive 6–7 pounds of fresh produce every day along with daily enrichment activities and sometimes larger celebrations, such as "Chimpsgiving" feasts. In 2020, Project Chimps established Project Harvest, a multi-acre farm area on the property to begin growing their own food for the chimpanzees. In 2021, Project Chimps opened several hiking trails on its property on the perimeter, outside of the chimpanzee area. Hikers can explore the trails from dawn to dusk every day of the year and may hear the chimps as they hike.

Over the years, Project Chimps' transport team has been called upon by the North American Primate Sanctuary Alliance (NAPSA) as well as People for the Ethical Treatment of Animals (PETA) to assist in relocating chimpanzees from defunct facilities to other sanctuaries. In early 2021, the transport team relocated 6 chimps from the bankrupted Wildlife Waystation in California to the Chimpanzee Sanctuary Northwest in Washington state. They then made a second trip for 8 more chimps from the Waystation for a 2,600 mile journey to the Center for Great Apes in Florida.

Later in 2021, Project Chimps assisted with the relocation of 6 chimps from the Missouri Primate Foundation under the operation of Tonia Haddix and delivered the chimps to the Center for Great Apes in Florida. The HBO documentary titled "Chimp Crazy" featured this rescue. Notably missing from the Festus-based facility at the time of the rescue was a chimp named Tonka, presumed deceased, but who was later to be found hidden by Haddix. Project Chimps leadership commented on the deplorable living conditions of Tonka to Rolling Stone in 2022. As of May 2026, Project Chimps is home to 99 chimpanzees.
