= Dave Babcock =

Canadian saxophonist

- Born: 1960 or 1961 (age 65–66); Vancouver, British Columbia
- Occupations: Saxophonist, singer, bandleader, producer
- Instrument: Saxophone
- Website: davebabcock.com

Dave Babcock is a Canadian saxophonist, singer, bandleader, and producer. He was a guest on Kenny "Blues Boss" Wayne's Jumpin' & Boppin' album. He played at a memorial event for ice hockey player Dave Semenko in 2017.

== Biography ==
Originally from Vancouver, Babcock began playing the saxophone in Edmonton. After graduating from the Grant MacEwan College music program, he performed with local groups across several genres, including jazz, blues, R&B, and pop.

In 1997, Babcock played baritone saxophone on the Jay McShann album Hootie's Jumpin' Blues. In the spring of 2003, he began pre-production on his first solo album, Happenstance. The instrumental jazz album features ten original compositions, most of which were written by Babcock in collaboration with keyboardist Chris Andrew. Happenstance was released on April 10, 2004, at the Yardbird Suite in Edmonton.

In 2008, Babcock played Saxophone on the Amos Garrett album Get Way Back: A Tribute To Percy Mayfield, in which he also arranged the horn section. A critical review in Sing Out! stated his contribution as "inobtrusively effective".

Babcock leads the Jump Orchestra, a Jump blues group originally active from 1989 to 1994 but was reformed in 2010 whence they released the album Jump To It.

Babcock received a Distinguished Alumni Award in 2023.

== Personal life ==
Babcock lives in Edmonton with his wife, Jennifer. He works full-time as a consultant with Rawlco Radio Ltd., serving as executive producer of Project 10K20.
