= Chris Craddock =

Canadian actor, playwright and filmmaker

- Education: University of Alberta (BFA)
- Occupations: Actor; playwright; filmmaker

Chris Craddock is a Canadian actor, playwright and filmmaker. From 2004 to 2008, he served as the artistic director of the Rapid Fire Theatre. He is also a co-creator and cast member of the television series Tiny Plastic Men, for which he was nominated for a Rosie Award for Best Performance by an Alberta Actor. He also wrote and directed the film It's Not My Fault and I Don't Care Anyway (2017), which is based on his play Public Speaking.

At the 19th GLAAD Media Awards, Craddock, along with Nathan Cuckow and Aaron Marci, won the GLAAD Media Award for Outstanding New York Theater: Off-Off Broadway for their play BASH'd: A Gay Rap Opera.

Craddock is from Kitchener, Ontario. In 1996, he graduated from the University of Alberta with a Bachelor of Fine Arts in acting. He resides in Edmonton as of October 2017.

== Select plays ==
- BASH'd: A Gay Rap Opera (co-written with Nathan Cuckow; music by Aaron Marci)
- Public Speaking
- Irma Voth
