= Shadow Theatre =

Coordinates: 53°31′8″N 113°29′47″W

The Shadow Theatre is an Edmonton-based theatre company born of the Edmonton International Fringe Festival in 1990.

== History ==
Shadow Theatre was incorporated in 1992, operating under the governance of a volunteer Board of Directors. Co-founded by Heartland star Shaun Johnston and current Artistic Director John Hudson. The two main people that created and maintain the theater are John Hudson (Artistic Director), Coralie Cairns (actor). The company is housed in the Varscona Theatre (200 seats) in the heart of Old Strathcona. The theatre has produced a regular mainstage season since 1995, typically offering modern classics, contemporary plays from around the world, and new Canadian works.
