= Belinda Cornish =

Canadian actress and playwright

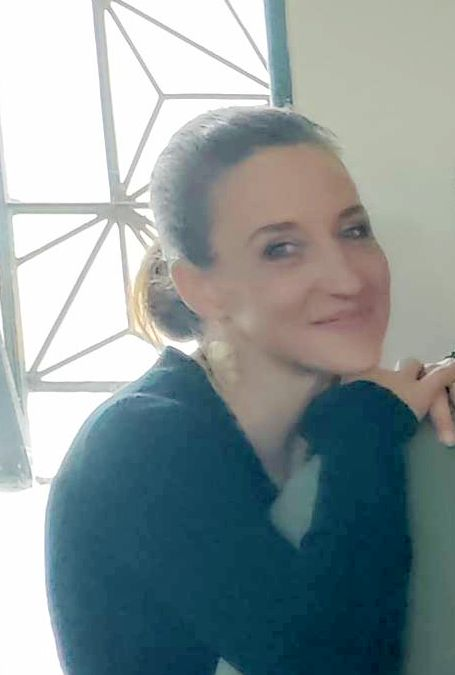
- Cornish at a Call of Cthulhu event in 2025
- Occupations: actress; playwright
- Years active: 2003–present

Belinda Cornish is a Canadian actress and playwright based in Edmonton, Alberta. She is most noted for her role in the television series Tiny Plastic Men, for which she received a Canadian Screen Award nomination for Best Actress in a Comedy Series at the 4th Canadian Screen Awards in 2016.

Her plays have included Diamond Dog, Thrubwell's Pies, Little Elephants, Category E and an adaptation of Todd Babiak's novel The Garneau Block. Cornish also appeared with a touring Call of Cthulhu actual play group in 2025.

== Filmography ==
=== Film ===
Year	Title	Role	Notes
2003	Purple Gas	Deke Ravenwood	
2003	Turnbuckle	Bel Reegis	

=== Television ===
Year	Title	Role	Notes
2012–2015	Tiny Plastic Men	Alexandra	23 episodes
2015	A Frosty Affair	Brittany	Television film
2017	Legendary Myths: Raven Adventures	Various	5 episodes
2018	Caution: May Contain Nuts	Various	11 episodes
2020	Locked in Love	Pascale	Episode: "Chapter 1"

=== Video games ===
Year	Title	Role
2007	Mass Effect	Rana Thanoptis / Alliance Computer / Dr. Hymes
2008	Mass Effect: Bring Down the Sky	Female Computer
2009	Dragon Age: Origins	Goldanna / Sergeant Tanna / Chanter Rosamund
2010	Mass Effect 2	Rana Thanoptis / MSV Hugo Gernsback Doctor
2010	Dragon Age: Origins – Awakening	The Baroness / Additional voices
2011	Dragon Age II	Ser Marlein Selbrech / Sergeant Joanna / Additional voices
2012	Mass Effect 3	Aria's Lieutenant - Omega DLC
2014	Dragon Age: Inquisition	Additional voices
2017	Mass Effect: Andromeda	Additional voices
2021	Mass Effect Legendary Edition	Rana Thanoptis / Alliance Computer / Dr. Hymes
