= Stewart Lemoine =

Canadian playwright, director, and producer

Stewart Lemoine is a Canadian playwright, director, and producer. Lemoine was the Artistic Director of Teatro la Quindicina from 1982 to 2007. In 2008 he became Teatro's resident playwright, working on his own original comedies and mentoring the troupe's new writers at Old Strathcona's Varscona Theatre.

Lemoine has written over seventy plays in the course of his career. He is the winner of 9 Sterling Awards for The Glittering Heart (1990), The Book of Tobit (1993), The Noon Witch (1995), Pith (1998), At the Zenith of the Empire (2006), The Oculist's Holiday (2009), Witness to a Conga (2010), Cause and Effect and Marvelous Pilgrims (2013), and A Lesson in Brio (2018). He received a Dora Mavor Moore Award for The Vile Governess and Other Psychodramas (1986). He won the New York International Fringe Festival’s Award for Overall Excellence in Playwriting for the remount of Pith! in 2004. He received the Queen's Golden Jubilee Medal in 2003 and the Diamond Jubilee Medal in 2013. He received the Tommy Bank Performing Arts Award from the Province of Alberta in 2008, and in 2010 he was inducted into the City of Edmonton's Cultural Hall of Fame.

== Works ==
=== Selected Plays ===
- All These Heels (1982) co-author Phil Zyp
- The Unremembered Budapest - collection of short works (1984)
- Dinah's Wine Bar(1984)
- Women in Bed (1985)
- My Miami Melody (1985)
- The Vile Governess and Other Psychodramas (1986)
- Cocktails at Pam's (1986)
- What Gives? (1986) Music by R.J. Smart and Gary Lloyd
- Neck-Breaking Car-Hop (1987)
- Swiss Pajamas (1988)
- Hopscotch Holiday (1900) Music by R.J. Smart and Gary Lloyd
- Damp Fury (1988)
- When Girls Collide (1989)
- Teens in Togas (1989) (Music by Gary Lloyd)
- All Ears (1989)
- Planet of the Lost Swing Babes (1990) Music by Gary Lloyd
- The Glittering Heart (1990)
- The Swift Hotel (1990)
- The Hothouse Prince (1991)
- The Jazz Mother (1991)
- A Night with Barbara (1991)
- The Spanish Abbess of Pilsen (1992)
- Two Tall Too Thin (1992)
- The Argentine Picnic and Other Lemoine Vignettes (1992)
- Shockers Delight! (1993)
- The Book of Tobit (1993)
- The Delightful Garden of Saint Piquillo/The Visitation of the Paragon (1994)
- Connie in Egypt (1994)
- The Noon Witch (1995)
- Evelyn Strange (1995)
- Fall Down Go Boom: A Skater's Tragedy (1996)
- Fatty Goes to College (1996)
- The Velvet Shock (1996)
- The Lake of the Heart (1997)
- The Subject of My Affections (1997)
- Fatty's Big Show (1997)
- Pith! (1997)
- Whiplash Weekend! (1997)
- The Subject of My Affections (1998)
- The Rules of Irene (1998)
- Tales of the Electress (1998) co-author Trevor Anderson
- Fever-Land (1999)
- Fatty Goes Wild (1999)
- Skirts on Fire (2000)
- Orlando Unhinged (2001)
- On the Banks of the Nut (2001)
- Eros and the Itchy Ant (2002) Musical sequence composed by Ryan Sigurdson
- The Exquisite Hour (2002)
- Vidalia (2002)
- Caribbean Muskrat (2003) co-author Josh Dean
- The Margin of the Sky (2003)
- The Salon of the Talking Turk (2005)
- A Momentary Lapse (2005) co-author Jocelyn Ahlf
- A Grand Time in the Rapids (2005)
- At the Zenith of the Empire (2005)
- Hey, Countess! (2006)
- East of My Usual Brain (2007)
- Revenge of the South Sea Bubble 2008
- A Rocky Night for His Nibs (2008)
- Happy Toes (2008)
- The Addlepated Nixie (2009)
- Mother of the Year (2009)
- The Oculist's Holiday (2009)
- The Seersucker Toady (2010)
- The Ambassador's Wives (2010)
- Witness to a Conga (2010)
- The Scent of Compulsion (2011)
- Mrs. Lindeman Proposes... (2011)
- The Hoof and Mouth Advantage (2011) co-author Jocelyn Ahlf
- The Adulteress (2012)
- Angels on Horseback (2012) co-author Jocelyn Ahlf
- The Nutcracker Unhinged (2012)
- Cause and Effect (2013)
- Marvelous Pilgrims (2013)
- The Euphorians (2014)
- Saint Albert (2015)
- For the Love of Cynthia (2016)
- A Second Round of Seconds (2016)
- I Heard About Your Murder (2017)
- The Charm Offensive (2017)
- The Finest of Strangers (2018)
- The Many Loves of Irene Sloane (2018)
- A Lesson in Brio (2018)
- A Likely Story (2019)
- Best Foot Sideways (2019)
- Love is for Poor People (2023)
- I Meant What I Said (2026)
