= Elizabeth Sterling Haynes Award =

- Awarded for: Excellence in Edmonton theatre.
- Country: Canada
- First award: 1987
- Website: http://www.sterlingawards.com/

The Elizabeth Sterling Haynes Award (also known as the Sterling Award) is a local Edmonton, Alberta award presented annually which honours excellence in theatre. The award covers a number of categories, including production, performance, direction, writing, choreography, and design, as well as a special award recognizing achievement in theatre administration.

Named after Elizabeth Sterling Haynes, who helped establish and nurture Edmonton professional theatre in the early 20th century, the award was established in 1987. Each winner receives a metal statuette, plated in silver.

Past winners have included Loretta Bailey, Ronnie Burkett, Tantoo Cardinal, Brent Carver, Guys in Disguise, Marty Chan, Jeff Haslam, Martha Henry, Stewart Lemoine, Mary Kerr and Stephen Ouimette.

== See also ==
- Jessie Richardson Theatre Award
- Dora Mavor Moore Award
- Dora Audience Choice Award
- Floyd S. Chalmers Canadian Play Award
