= Edmonton International Fringe Festival =

Fringe festival in Alberta

Coordinates: 53.518°N 113.495°W

- Genre: Fringe Theatre Festival
- Dates: Past years 1982: August 14 to August 22; 1983: August 13 to August 21; 1984: August 18 to August 26; 1985: August 17 to August 25; 1986: August 16 to August 24; 1987: August 15 to August 23; 1988: August 13 to August 21; 1989: August 19 to August 27; 1990: August 18 to August 26; 1991: August 17 to August 25; 1992: August 15 to August 23; 1993: August 13 to August 22; 1994: August 12 to August 21; 1995: August 18 to August 27; 1996: August 16 to August 25; 1997: August 15 to August 24; 1998: August 13 to August 23; 1999: August 12 to August 22; 2000: August 17 to August 27; 2001: August 16 to August 26; 2002: August 15 to August 25; 2003: August 14 to August 24; 2004: August 12 to August 22; 2005: August 18 to August 28; 2006: August 17 to August 27; 2007: August 16 to August 26; 2008: August 14 to August 24; 2009: August 13 to August 23; 2010: August 12 to August 22; 2011: August 11 to August 21; 2012: August 16 to August 26; 2013: August 15 to August 25; 2014: August 14 to August 24; 2015: August 13 to August 23; 2016: August 11 to August 21; 2017: August 17 to August 27; 2018: August 16 to August 26; 2019: August 15 to August 25; ~~2020: August 13 to August 23~~ (Note: The 2020 festival was cancelled due to the COVID-19 pandemic.); 2021: August 12 to August 22; 2022: August 11 to August 21; 2023: August 17 to August 27; 2024: August 15 to August 25; 2025: August 14 to August 24; 2026: August 13 to August 23
- Locations: Edmonton, Alberta; Canada
- Years active: 1982 – present
- Organiser: Fringe Theatre
- Website: Edmonton International Fringe Festival

The Edmonton International Fringe Theatre Festival is an annual arts festival held every August in Edmonton, Alberta, Canada. Produced by the Fringe Theatre (Fringe Theatre Adventures or FTA), it is the oldest and largest fringe theatre festival in North America (based on ticket sales). The Edmonton Fringe is a founding member of the Canadian Association of Fringe Festivals.

Fringe Theatre is a charitable arts organization, Fringe Theatre brings community together through the power of storytelling. Fringe supports Artists by giving them the tools and platform they need to put on their productions and reach audiences.

In 2014, 118,280 tickets were sold, up from 117,000 in 2013. The 2014 event had over 210 shows and 1,600 performances, with an estimated outdoor site attendance of 665,750. In 2016, the attendance rate reached a record-breaking high of 850,000+ attendees. In 2017 there was a record-breaking 130,000 tickets sold and $1.2 million in box office sales during the festival, which held performances from over 1,500 artists in 220 shows.

In 2023, 114,632 tickets were sold. The 2023 event had 161 indoor theatre shows and over 1,400 performances with an estimated outdoor site attendance of ~550,000 and $1.2 million in ticket sales directly into the pockets of Fringe Artists.

== History ==
In 1982, Chinook Theatre's artistic director Brian Paisley received $50,000 from Edmonton's Summerfest to put together "A Fringe Theatre Event" in Edmonton's Old Strathcona District. Inspired by the Edinburgh Festival Fringe, Scotland, the Edmonton Fringe (the first in North America) offered 200 live performances in five theatre venues.

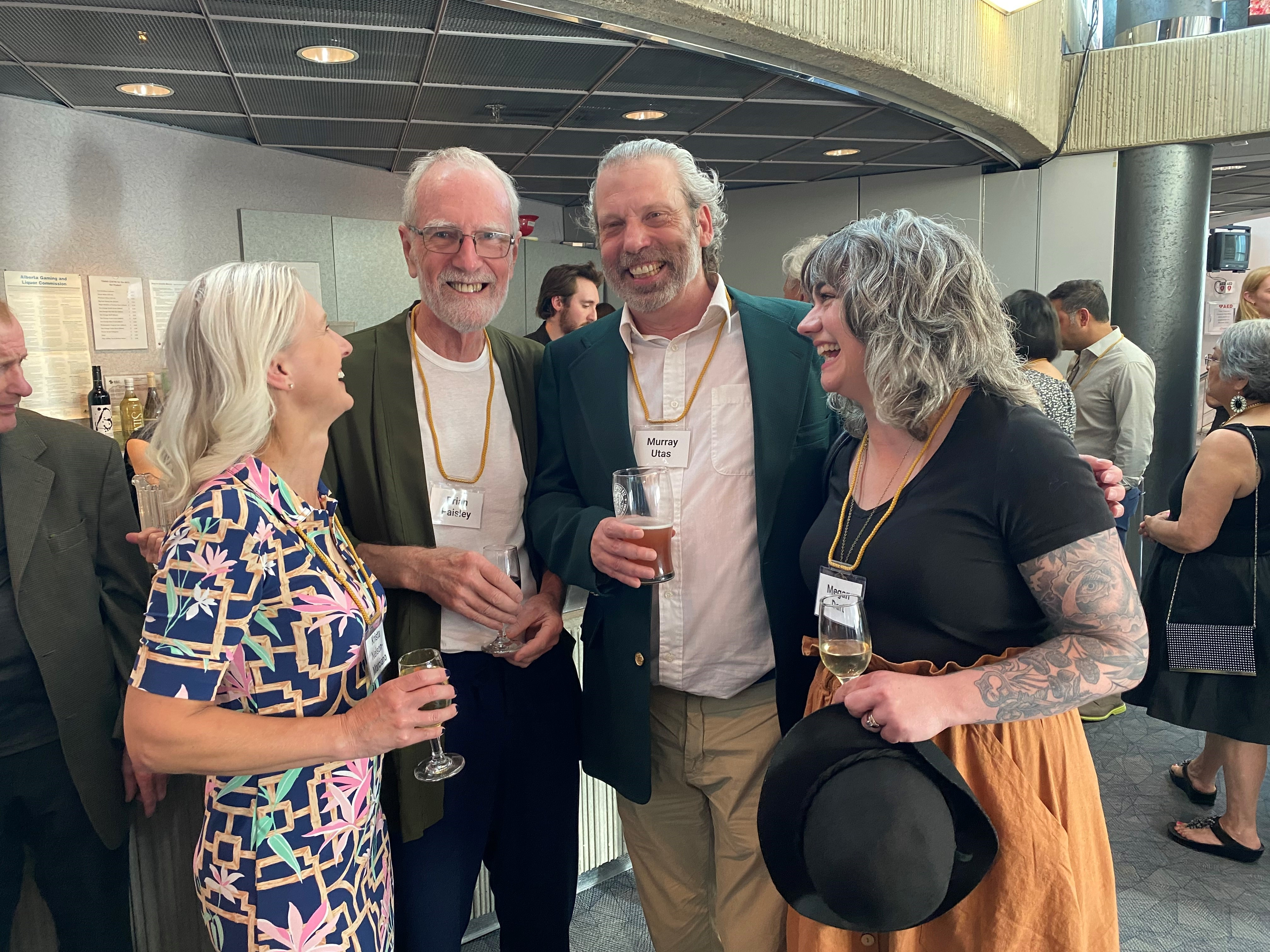
Brian Paisley, Edmonton Fringe's founder poses with the Current Executive Director and Artistic Director.

The 2020 Edmonton International Fringe Festival (scheduled for August 13 to 23, 2020) was cancelled due to the COVID-19 pandemic, the only time the festival has been cancelled since its inception.

The Edmonton International Fringe Theatre Festival celebrated its 40th anniversary in 2021; it also marked the return of the Festival in a scaled-down capacity in order to meet the arts community where they were at amid the COVID-19 pandemic.

== Venues ==
The festival itself largely takes place in Old Strathcona which has a number of permanent theatres (including the Westbury Theatre, the Backstage Theatre, and Studio Theatre in the Fringe Theatre Arts Barns, the Walterdale Playhouse, the Varscona Theatre, the Roxy on 124th, and the Princess Theatre) and a number of other venues which are converted by FTA or independent artists into temporary theatre venues. During the festival, the streets and alleys of the neighbourhood are also filled with street performers and masked or costumed actors promoting their plays.

Unlike the Edinburgh Festivals, where artists are responsible for finding and running their own venues, the Edmonton Fringe implements a system in which for an application fee, the festival provides some artists with a venue, a set number of performances, two technicians, and front-of-house and ticketing services and general festival marketing. In recent years, there have been more performances than venues available directly through the Edmonton Fringe, so a random lottery selection is used to choose which performances will be held in those venues. Artists (particularly those whose performances are not selected in the random lottery) may also arrange for their own performance space independently as a "Bring Your Own Venue" or BYOV, similar to the Edinburgh Fringe model. These venues may be found throughout Edmonton, with one concentration of such venues near the Faculté Saint-Jean in an area known as "The French Quarter".

== Performers ==
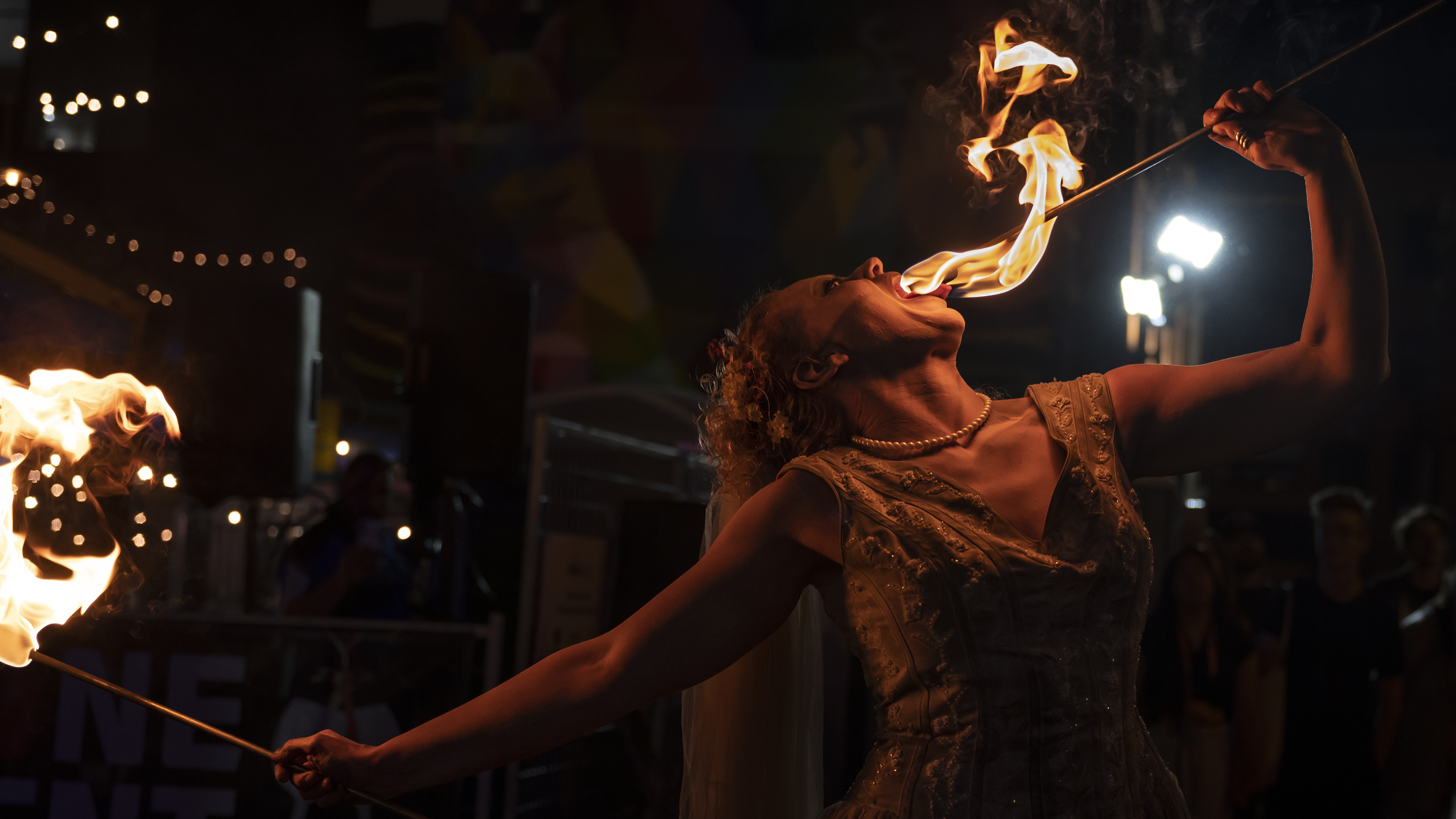
Undead Newlyweds at Fringe 2022 by Marc J Chalifoux Photography

Admittance for performers to the festival is determined by application to a lottery held each November. The emphasis is on theatre, but performances can and do feature almost every form of art and entertainment. In addition to the hundreds of national and international artists who travel from around the world to bring their shows to the Edmonton Fringe, there are also hundreds of local performers who participate each year. Many of the local performers have been with the festival since the early years. Performers such as Ken Brown, local magician Ron Pearson, Rapid Fire Theatre, Die-Nasty, Jan Randall Teatro la Quindicina, Darrin Hagen and Kevin Hendricks of Guys in Disguise, Panties Productions, Mump and Smoot, The Wombats, Ribbit Productions, The Dan Show, Nikolai, Ryan Stock of Insane Entertainment, Three Dead Trolls in a Baggie and Tim Waterson have appeared at the festival regularly.

== Support for Queer Artists ==
For Edmonton queer theatre artists, Fringe is a chance to tell stories they want to tell and to share them with audiences that are willing and interested to listen. Notable queer artists that got their start at Edmonton Fringe include Ronnie Burkett, Brad Fraser, and Darrin Hagen. Common themes in Fringe productions resonate with queer audiences and artists; such as navigating identity, sexuality and relationships, confronting bigotry and living one's authentic self.
