= Varscona Theatre =

- Interactive map of Varscona Theatre
- Address: 10329 83 Avenue NW; Edmonton; Canada
- Coordinates: 53°31′8″N 113°29′47″W
- Capacity: 176

Construction
- Years active: 1983-present

Website
- http://varsconatheatre.com/

The Varscona Theatre is a live performance venue in the Old Strathcona neighborhood of Edmonton, Alberta, Canada. Since 1994, the Varscona has been operated by a consortium of small theatre companies, including Teatro la Quindicina and Shadow Theatre (collectively known as The Varscona Theatre Alliance). The theatre is also the home of the nationally renowned live improvised soap opera Die-Nasty. In addition, the Varscona has hosted tapings of The Irrelevant Show, a national sketch comedy program aired on CBC Radio. The Varscona holds over 300 performances and has 30,000 audience members per year. It employs 100 local professional theatre artists.

== History ==
The building was initially constructed as Edmonton's Fire Hall #6 in 1956, which replaced the brick 1909 Fire Hall #6 across the road (the 1909 building has been home to The Walterdale Playhouse since 1974). The city's firefighting Fire Station #6 was relocated to 81 Avenue at 96 Street, and the building was repurposed as a theatre in 1982, under the name Chinook Theatre. It was renamed as The Varscona Theatre in 1996. It was rebuilt, using the old fire hall as a shell, in 2016. The old hose tower was preserved as a prominent eminence in the new building.

From 1983 to 1993, it served as the headquarters of Chinook Children's Theatre and the Edmonton International Fringe Festival. It is still used as a venue during the Fringe Festival every August.

=== Name ===
The Varscona's name is an homage to Edmonton's original Varscona Theatre, a 1940s art deco movie theatre formerly at the intersection of Whyte Avenue and 109 Street. The movie theatre was demolished in 1987 for the construction of a credit union (later a TD Canada Trust). The 1987 building was subsequently demolished and replaced, in 2009, by a Shoppers Drug Mart.

== Renovations ==
In 2012, the theatre announced plans for a significant rehabilitation project. The plan would see most of the theatre demolished and rebuilt, with only the exterior brick walls and iconic tower remaining in the new structure. The project was to address the significant mechanical and utility failures that had developed in the building over the years, and expand the small lobby and backstage areas, which have plagued the building since its conversion from a fire hall. The theatre will also increase in capacity from 176 to 200 seats, with improved sightlines, and the audio and lighting systems will be replaced completely.

In May 2013, the Government of Alberta announced a $2 million grant to renovate the facility. The City of Edmonton and the Government of Canada have also contributed funding to the $7.5 million project, with the remaining funds coming from public donations. While the renovation project was underway, the Varscona Theatre Alliance built and moved all performances into The Backstage Theatre at the Fringe Theatre Adventures in the ATB Financial Arts Barns, one block away. The Varscona Theatre rebuild officially started construction in Spring of 2015 and opened its doors for its first production on June 2, 2016, with a new play from Teatro La Quindicina, For The Love of Cynthia by Stewart Lemoine.
