= 10th Canadian Comedy Awards =

2009 award ceremony

- Date: 2 October 2009
- Location: Imperial Theatre; Saint John, New Brunswick
- Country: Canada
- Presented by: Canadian Comedy Foundation for Excellence
- Hosted by: Seán Cullen

Highlights
- Most wins: Television: The Jon Dore Television Show and Less Than Kind (2); Film: Young People Fucking (3); Person: Ron Sparks and Martin Gero (2)
- Most nominations: Television: This Hour Has 22 Minutes (5); Film: Young People Fucking (8); Radio: CFEX 92.9 FM, Calgary (2); Person: Martin Gero and Ron Sparks (2)
- Website: www.canadiancomedyawards.org

The 10th Canadian Comedy Awards, presented by the Canadian Comedy Foundation for Excellence (CCFE), honoured the best live, television, film, and Internet comedy of 2008. The ceremony was held at the Imperial Theatre in Saint John, New Brunswick on 2 October 2009 and was hosted by Seán Cullen.

Canadian Comedy Awards, also known as Beavers, were awarded in 22 categories. Some winners were picked by members of industry organizations, while others were chosen by the Canadian public through an online poll. The awards ceremony was held during the four-day Canadian Comedy Awards Festival which showcased performances by over 100 comic artists. A Best of the Fest special was broadcast by The Comedy Network.

The film Young People Fucking led with eight nominations followed by This Hour Has 22 Minutes with five and Ron Sparks with two. Young People Fucking won three Beavers, followed by Ron Sparks, The Jon Dore Television Show and Less Than Kind with two wins each.

== Festival and ceremony ==
The 10th Canadian Comedy Awards and Festival ran from 1 to 4 October 2009 in Saint John, New Brunswick. The festival included numerous shows and workshops.

The awards ceremony was held on 2 October 2009 at the Imperial Theatre, hosted by Seán Cullen. The Last Laugh Gala was held the following night at the same venue; both events were taped by sponsor The Comedy Network for later broadcast.

=== Related events ===
On 5 August 2009, two months before the festival, the show Canadian Comedy Award Nominees vs. Cancer was held at The Rivoli in Toronto, Ontario. The show was a pay-what-you-can fundraiser for the Canadian Cancer Society.

The Canadian Comedy Awards 10th Anniversary Special was taped at Toronto's Masonic Temple in the fall of 2009. Samantha Bee and Jason Jones hosted the show, though when they had first agreed to do so they thought it was for the awards ceremony. Instead, it was a showcase of Beaver-winning comedians from the past decade. It was broadcast by The Comedy Network on 15 May 2010.

When the festival came to New Brunswick, James Mullinger and Lloyd Ravn stayed to build a comedy scene in the province. Seven years later Mullinger staged the show Every Comedian in New Brunswick featuring 42 local comics. Shane Ogden, who won the Funniest Person in New Brunswick contest as part of the CCAF, is also credited with bringing stand-up comedy to the province, and opened the first comedy club in Saint John in 2015.

== Winners and nominees ==
The multimedia, Internet and Canadian Comedy Person of the Year awards had been decided by public vote through an online poll. Winners in the 19 other categories had been decided through votes from industry members. Voting took place during July 2009.

Winners are listed first and highlighted in boldface:

=== Multimedia ===
Canadian Comedy Person of the Year	Best Radio Program or Clip
**Seth Rogen**; Russell Peters; Rick Mercer; Brent Butt; Cast of Royal Canadian Air Farce	"**Zen Hokey Pokey**" by **Joe Bird, The Irrelevant Show**; "Spelling Bee" by Canadian Content, XM Radio; "Smoking" by Josh Holliday, CFEX 92.9 FM, Calgary; "Stalker" by Josh Holliday and Lisa Brooke, CFEX 92.9 FM, Calgary; "Witches" by Mark Meer and Marianne Copithorne, The Irrelevant Show

=== Live ===
Best Taped Live Performance	Best Stand-up Newcomer
**Ron Sparks** – **Comedy Now!**; Debra DiGiovanni – Halifax Comedy Festival; Laurie Elliott – Just For Laughs Gala; Jeremy Hotz – Just For Laughs Gala; Jeremy Hotz – What a Miserable Show This Is	**Nathan Macintosh**; Andrew Johnston; Lori Gibbs; Bobby Mair; Martha O'Neill
Best Male Stand-up	Best Female Stand-up
**Jeremy Hotz**; Scott Faulconbridge; Glen Foster; David Pryde; Sugar Sammy	**Debra DiGiovanni**; Kate Davis; Shelley Marshall; Allyson Smith; Kristeen von Hagen
Best Male Improviser	Best Female Improviser
**Kerry Griffin**; Matt Baram; Ian Boothby; James Gangl; Taz VanRassel	**Jan Caruana**; Amy Matysio; Lisa Merchant; Caitlin Howden; Naomi Snieckus
Best Sketch Troupe or Company	Best Improv Troupe or Company
**The Second City**; Picnicface; Shoeless; The Imponderables; The Sketchersons	**National Theatre of the World**, **Impromptu Splendor**; About An Hour; Monkey Toast; PROJECTproject; Urban Improv
Best One Person Show	Best Comedic Play, Revue or Series
**One Woman Show**; Fear of a Brown Planet - Nile Séguin; Lupe: Undone - Melissa D'Agostino; Who's Afraid of Tippi Seagram? - Colette Kendall; Wild Rose	**Barack To The Future**; Battleawesome Awesomestar; It's Just a Phase; That's Oddville; Troubadour

=== Television ===
Best Direction in a Program or Series	Best Writing in a Program or Series
**Adam Brodie** and **Dave Derewlany** – **The Jon Dore Television Show** – "**Jon Gets Haunted**"; Matt Hawkins – The Jon Dore Television Show – "Jon Gets Horny"; Ryan Keller – Bravo!FACT Presents: The Second City's Facebook of Revelations; Brian Roberts – Da Kink in My Hair, Ep. 209; Shawn Alex Thompson – Less Than Kind	**Ron Sparks** – **Comedy Now!**; Mark Critch, Gavin Crawford, Kyle Tingley, Jennifer Whalen, Albert Howell, Tim McAuliffe, Dean Jenkinson, Geri Hall, Nathan Fielder, Joanne O'Sullivan, Peter White – This Hour Has 22 Minutes, XVI episode 12; Marvin Kaye and Chris Sheasgreen – Less Than Kind; Irwin Barker, Greg Eckler, Chris Finn, Paul Mather, Rick Mercer and Tim Steeves – Rick Mercer Report; Bruce Pirrie, Darryl Hinds, Jim Annan, Karen Parker, Lauren Ash, Marty Adams, Scott Montgomery, Matthew Reid – Bravo!FACT Presents: The Second City's Facebook of Revelations
Best Performance by a Male	Best Performance by a Female
**Jon Dore** – **The Jon Dore Television Show**; Gavin Crawford – This Hour Has 22 Minutes; Nathan Fielder – This Hour Has 22 Minutes; Peter Oldring – Good Morning World; Alan Park – Royal Canadian Air Farce	**Wendel Meldrum** – **Less Than Kind**; Aimee Beaudoin – Caution: May Contain Nuts; Inga Cadranel – Rent-A-Goalie; Geri Hall – This Hour Has 22 Minutes; Cathy Jones – This Hour Has 22 Minutes
Best Performance by an Ensemble
**Less Than Kind**; Bravo!FACT Presents: The Second City's Facebook of Revelations; Good Morning World; The Latest Buzz; Three Chords from the Truth

=== Film ===
Best Performance by a Male	Best Performance by a Female
**Peter Oldring** – **Young People Fucking**; Nicholas Carella – Hooked on Speedman; Josh Dean – Young People Fucking; Ennis Esmer – Young People Fucking; Jason Jones – Coopers' Camera	**Samantha Bee** – **Coopers' Camera**; Shannon Beckner – Boyfriend Latte; Kristin Booth – Young People Fucking; Natalie Lisinska – Young People Fucking; Carly Pope – Young People Fucking
Best Direction	Best Writing
**Martin Gero** – **Young People Fucking**; Michelle Ouellet – Hooked on Speedman; Mark Sanders – Boyfriend Latte; Warren P. Sonoda – Coopers' Camera	**Martin Gero** and **Aaron Abrams** – **Young People Fucking**; Shannon Beckner and Mark Sanders – Boyfriend Latte; Nicholas Carella and Vince Gabriele – Hooked on Speedman; Chris Charney – Wild Cherry; Jason Jones and Mike Beaver – Coopers' Camera

=== Internet ===
Best Web Clip
- **Violator**
- Flakaderm
- Mouth of Gold
- Mush Mouth
- Weapon Accident

=== Special awards ===
Chairman's Award	Dave Broadfoot Award
**Lorne Perlmutar**	**Mary Walsh**

== Multiple wins ==
The following people, shows, films, etc. received multiple awards

Awards	Person or work
3	Young People Fucking
2	The Jon Dore Television Show
2	Less Than Kind
2	Ron Sparks

== Multiple nominations ==
The following people, shows, films, etc. received multiple nominations

Nominations	Person or work
8	Young People Fucking
5	This Hour Has 22 Minutes
4	Coopers' Camera
4	Less Than Kind
3	Boyfriend Latte
3	Hooked on Speedman
3	Jeremy Hotz
3	The Jon Dore Television Show
3	The Second City
2	Bravo!FACT Presents: The Second City's Facebook of Revelations
2	CFEX 92.9 FM, Calgary
2	The Irrelevant Show
2	Martin Gero
2	Ron Sparks
