= YPF (disambiguation) =

YPF (Yacimientos Petrolíferos Fiscales) is an Argentinian oil and gas company.

YPF may also refer to:

- Young People Fucking, a 2007 Canadian romantic comedy distributed in the US and UK as Y.P.F.
- Esquimalt Airport, in British Columbia, Canada (IATA code)
