= Rebecca Blumhagen =

American actress

Rebecca Blumhagen is an American actress and filmmaker from New York. She has played Samantha in the HBO / Cinemax breakout series The Girl's Guide to Depravity, where she is also a cowriter for season 2. Her other roles include portraying Claire in the movie Other Plans, appearing in Lefty Loosey Righty Tighty (2011), and in Get Happy (2015), and Harding in the film, Extinction: Patient Zero. She has also worked on stage. She appeared in Romeo and Juliet produced by the Virginia Shakespeare Festival in 2007. For her work playing Katia in Memory House at Merrimack Repertory Theatre, the Boston Globe called her "a remarkably expressive" actress.

As a filmmaker she has directed & produced videos for Apartment Therapy.
