= BravoFACT =

Canadian funding organization

- Abbreviation: Bravo
- Formation: 1995
- Dissolved: 2017
- Type: Foundation
- Purpose: Funding Canadian short films and videos
- Headquarters: Toronto, Ontario, Canada
- Official language: English, French

BravoFACT (Foundation to Assist Canadian Talent) was a Canadian fund that ran continuously from 1995 to 2017. It was established to fund the creation of Canadian arts-based short films and videos. BravoFACT funded shorts from various subject matters, genres and styles including animation, drama, comedy, dance, and more. BravoFACT was established in 1995 by Bravo, a Canadian specialty television channel devoted to the arts, as a condition of licence. The fund was supported entirely by Bravo, and the supported projects aired on Bravo! weekly, on BravoFACT Presents.

In 2017, at the request of Bell Media, the Canadian Radio-television and Telecommunications Commission deleted the condition of licence requiring Bravo! to financially contribute to BravoFACT. On September 26, 2017, bravoFACT was officially discontinued.

== Background ==
While active, BravoFACT's objectives were to:

- Stimulate public interest in Canadian excellence in the arts.
- Encourage the creation of new ways of presenting the arts on television.
- Increase public recognition of Canadian artists and their works.
- Provide professional opportunities for film and video-makers.

"The idea is for artists to be given a chance to have their work exposed to the greater television viewing audience," said executive director Judy Gladstone. Bravo!FACT was the largest funder of short films in Canada, including I Met the Walrus. The fund also partnered with the National Film Board of Canada on Shorts in Motion: The Art of Seduction, one of the first multi-platform programs produced in Canada aimed at the mobile audience. The project won accolades around the world, including an International Interactive Emmy nomination, Best Made for Mobile Video Service at the GSM Global Mobile Awards (Barcelona, 2007) and Banff World Television Award for Best Original Content for Mobile (Banff, 2007).

== See also ==
- MuchFACT
- Canadian Radio-television and Telecommunications Commission
- Bell Media
