= Craft Corner Deathmatch =

- Genre: Game show
- Written by: Aaron Bergeron; Scott Prendergast
- Directed by: Scott Preston
- Presented by: Jason Jones
- Country of origin: United States
- Original language: English

Production
- Running time: 30 minutes

Original release
- Network: Style Network
- Release: 9 March 2005

Craft Corner Deathmatch is an American television show aired on the Style Network in 2005.

Two contestants were challenged by host Jason Jones to make things such as notebooks and handbags out of various objects. After ten minutes, the contestants showed their projects to a panel of judges who then rated it on a scale from one to ten. After two rounds, the winner faced the Craft Lady of Steel for a bonus prize.

Craft Corner Deathmatch had a wide range of celebrity judges from Betsey Johnson to Michael Kors. The show aired about 20 episodes and was then cancelled due to bad ratings.
