= Warren P. Sonoda =

Canadian film and television director

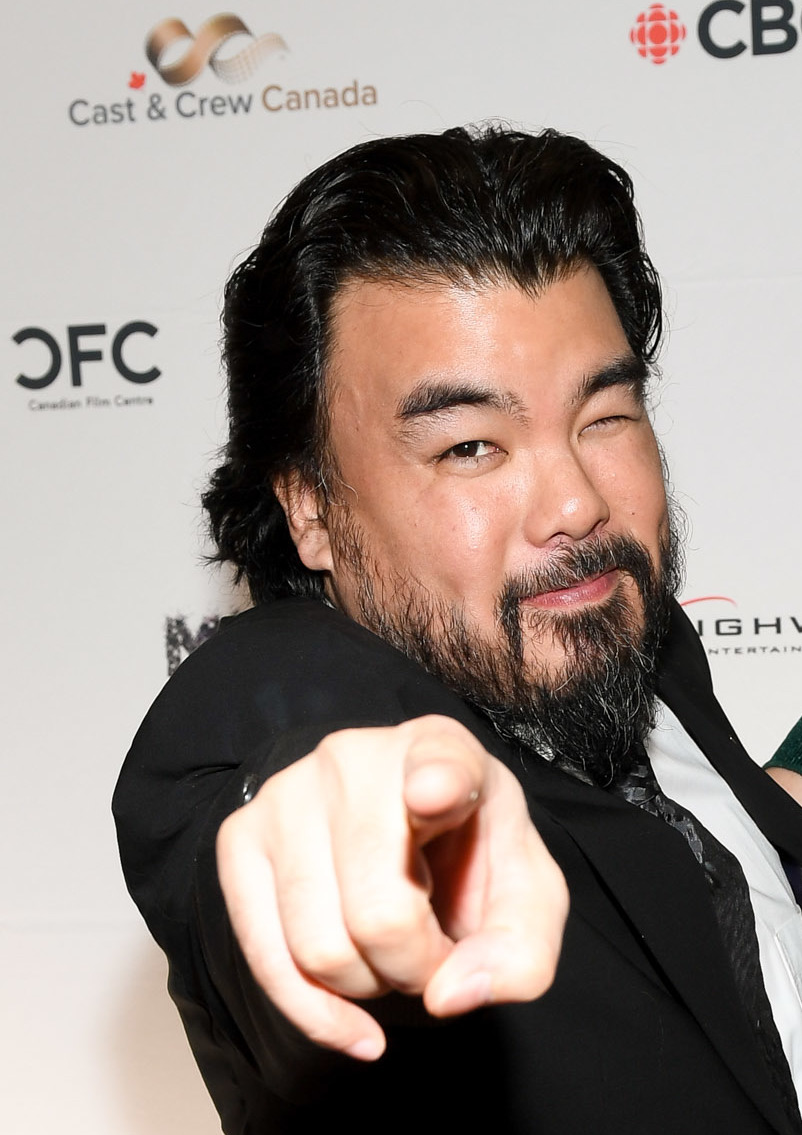
Warren Sonoda at the 2020 CFC Annual Gala & Auction

Warren P. Sonoda is a Canadian film and television director, and the current president of the Directors Guild of Canada.

== Biography ==
Originally from Hamilton, Ontario, he is currently based in Toronto.

He has directed the films Ham & Cheese (2004), 5ive Girls (2006), Coopers' Camera (2008), Puck Hogs (2009), Unrivaled (2010), Textuality (2011), Servitude (2011), Swearnet: The Movie (2014), The Masked Saint (2015), Total Frat Movie (2016), A Christmas Fury (2017) and Things I Do for Money (2019), and episodes of the television series Monster Warriors, What's Up Warthogs!, Todd and the Book of Pure Evil, Make It Pop, Raising Expectations, Trailer Park Boys, Dino Dana, Backstage, Utopia Falls, Odd Squad, This Hour Has 22 Minutes, Murdoch Mysteries, The Parker Andersons, Amelia Parker, I Woke Up a Vampire and The Trades.

He won the Canadian Screen Award for Best Direction in a Children's or Youth Program or Series at the 9th Canadian Screen Awards in 2021, for Odd Squad Mobile Unit. He is also a two-time Canadian Comedy Award nominee for Best Direction in a Film, receiving nominations at the 6th Canadian Comedy Awards for Ham & Cheese and at the 10th Canadian Comedy Awards for Coopers' Camera.

== Personal life ==
In October 2019, Sonoda married film producer Jen Pogue.
