= Take Me to the River (2015 film) =

- Theatrical release poster
- Directed by: Matt Sobel
- Written by: Matt Sobel
- Starring: Robin Weigert; Logan Miller; Ursula Parker; Richard Schiff; Azura Skye; Ashley Gerasimovich; Elizabeth Franz; Josh Hamilton
- Cinematography: Thomas Scott Stanton
- Edited by: Jacob Secher Schulsinger
- Distributed by: Film Movement
- Release dates: January 26, 2015 (Sundance Film Festival); March 18, 2016 (United States)
- Running time: 84 minutes
- Country: United States
- Language: English

Take Me to the River is a 2015 American drama film directed by Matt Sobel and starring Logan Miller, Richard Schiff, and Robin Weigert.

== Plot ==
Ryder, an openly gay 17-year-old high school student from California, travels with his mother, Cindy, and father, Don, to rural Nebraska to attend a family reunion on his uncle's farm. Ryder intends to use the trip as an opportunity to come out to his extended Midwestern family. However , Cindy strongly discourages him, insisting that revealing his sexuality would disrupt the family dynamic and provoke friction with her conservative relatives.

Upon arrival, Ryder’s urban attire—including a low-cut shirt and red shorts—immediately draws silent disdain from his older male relatives. In contrast, his four young female cousins, particularly nine-year-old Molly, are fascinated by him and follow him around the property.

While playing on the farm, Molly asks Ryder to accompany her to the barn to look at bird nests high in the rafters. Molly’s father, Keith—Cindy’s brother—explicitly warns her not to climb the hay bales. Shortly after entering the barn, Molly runs out crying hysterically, her dress smeared with blood. Keith immediately accuses Ryder of sexually assaulting Molly and physically attacks him. Ryder repeatedly denies the accusation, confused by what transpired. Cindy attempts to mediate, offering non-incriminating explanations such as a nosebleed, a scratch from the hay, or the onset of Molly’s first menstrual cycle. Keith refuses to let Cindy examine the girl and bars Ryder from the main house, forcing him to spend the night in a dilapidated, abandoned farmhouse nearby.

The following morning, Ryder and his parents discover that their vehicle has been vandalized with derogatory phrases, including "CALIFORNIA PERVERT." Despite the hostility, Keith sends one of his daughters to invite Ryder to his home for dinner to "make amends."

At the dinner table, the atmosphere remains tense and coercive. Keith subjects Ryder to psychological boundary-testing, pressuring him to sing in front of the family and asking pointed questions about his romantic interest in girls. Afterward, Keith takes Ryder outside to teach him how to load and fire a pistol. He then leaves Ryder and Molly alone together in a room with the door closed.

Later, Molly rides a horse alongside Ryder back toward his grandmother’s house. She redirects him to a nearby river and encourages him to wade into the water to play a game she refers to as "chicken fighting." When she climbs onto his shoulders in the water, Molly intentionally rubs her pelvis against Ryder's head and neck. Disturbed by her behavior, Ryder realizes that this was the exact physical position she had been in inside the barn before running out screaming. Molly runs off into the woods, leaving Ryder stranded and shaken.

Ryder returns to his grandmother's house to confront his parents and uncle. In the ensuing confrontation, the foundational family secret is revealed. Decades earlier, when Cindy and Keith were children, Cindy initiated the same physical game with Keith. When their mother discovered them, Cindy blamed Keith, leaving him branded as a sexual predator within the family and permanently fracturing his reputation. To exact revenge, Keith had conditioned Molly to recreate the game with Ryder in the barn, deliberately setting up the situation so Molly would react and frame Ryder, subjecting Cindy’s son to the same false accusation and social exile that Keith had suffered as a child. While the narrative leaves open whether Keith’s manipulation of Molly constitutes active sexual abuse or behavioral conditioning, it establishes that Molly learned the inappropriate behavior directly from her father.

Recognizing the deep-seated dysfunction and refusal of the family to address the underlying trauma, Ryder’s parents opt not to press the issue further. The film ends in silence as Ryder and his parents pack their car and drive away, leaving the family secret unresolved.

== Cast ==
- Logan Miller as Ryder
- Robin Weigert as Cindy
- Josh Hamilton as Keith
- Richard Schiff as Don
- Ursula Parker as Molly
- Elizabeth Franz as Evelyn
- Azura Skye as Ruth
- Ashley Gerasimovich as Abbey
- Grant Young as Jeremy
- Seth Young as Trenton
