= Christina Collard =

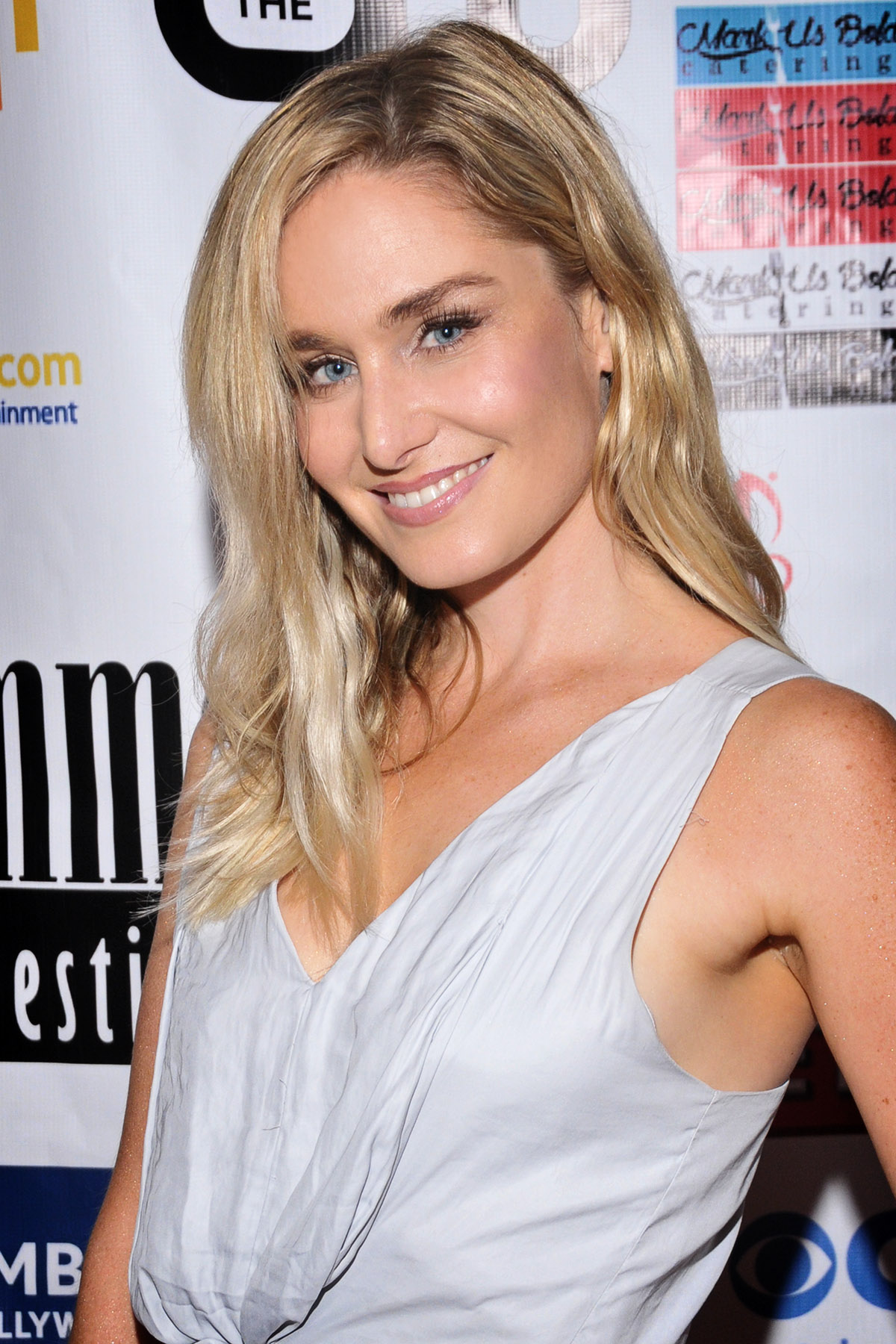
- Collard in 2015
- Born: 1988 (age 37–38); Melbourne, Australia
- Education: Monash University; National Institute of Dramatic Art
- Occupations: Actor, TV presenter, writer, model
- Years active: 2001–present

Christina Collard (born 1988) is an Australian actress television presenter writer and model. She has starred in the film Dracula: The Impaler, has had a recurring characters in the HBO/Cinemax series The Girl's Guide to Depravity, TBS series The Detour as well as Kevin Hart's sketch comedy show. She has appeared in dozens of commercials both nationally and globally.

== Early years and education ==
Collard was born in Melbourne, Australia. She received a degree from Monash University in Performing Arts and Drama, and studied Acting for the Screen at the National Institute of Dramatic Art.

== Career ==
Collard began her acting career in Australian television in 2001 when she was cast alongside Joel Edgerton in the drama series The Secret Life of Us. In the 2003 comedy Horseplay, she was cast alongside Hugo Weaving and Abbie Cornish. In 2013, she began playing a recurring character in the TV series The Girl's Guide to Depravity, filmed in Los Angeles, California. In 2012, she teamed up with Goatface Comedy for several sketches, including the short film Indian Spider-Man with co-stars Hasan Minhaj and Iqbal Theba. Later that year, she was cast alongside Lily Tomlin in the comedy short "Call to Action". Collard has hosted several episodes of Coldwell Banker's World's Most Expensive Homes series. She has also had roles in several horror films, including Dracula: The Impaler.

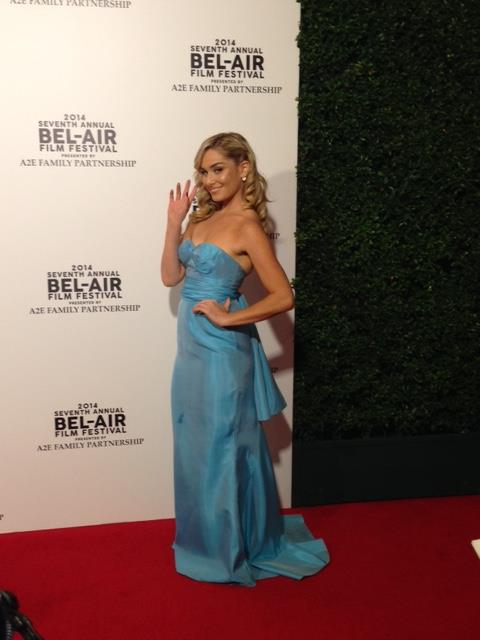
Collard at the seventh annual Bel-Air Film Festival in 2014

In 2014, Collard was selected as the Master of Ceremonies for the Bel Air Film Festival. She presented awards to a number of nominees, including Kathy Najimy and Mark Rydell, and presented the Lifetime Achievement Award to Tippi Hedren.

In 2015, Collard appeared in a modeling campaign for BEARPAW Footwear.
