= Coopers' Camera =

- Directed by: Warren P. Sonoda
- Written by: Jason Jones; Mike Beaver
- Produced by: Sean Buckley; Nicholas Tabarrok
- Starring: Jason Jones; Samantha Bee; Peter Keleghan; Mike Beaver
- Cinematography: Samy Inayeh
- Edited by: Aden Bahadori; Warren P. Sonoda
- Music by: Rob DeBoer; Tony Grace
- Production companies: Buck Productions; Darius Films
- Distributed by: Boutique Films
- Release date: September 7, 2008 (TIFF)
- Running time: 95 minutes
- Country: Canada
- Language: English

Coopers' Camera is a 2008 Canadian comedy film, directed by Warren P. Sonoda. The film centres on the Coopers, a dysfunctional family who are recording their family Christmas in 1985 on their new video camera, only for the holiday to descend into chaos.

The film stars Jason Jones and Samantha Bee as Gord and Nancy Cooper, Peter Keleghan as Gord's brother Tim and Mike Beaver as Uncle Nick, as well as Boyd Banks, Jennifer Baxter, Dave Foley, Jayne Eastwood, Dylan Everett, Gage Munroe and Rob Tinkler in supporting roles.

The film was shot in Toronto in early 2008, while Jones and Bee were on hiatus from The Daily Show.

The film premiered at the 2008 Toronto International Film Festival.

== Reception ==
The film received four Canadian Comedy Award nominations at the 10th Canadian Comedy Awards in 2009, for Best Performance by a Male in a Film (Jones), Best Performance by a Female in a Film (Bee), Best Direction in a Film (Sonoda) and Best Writing in a Film (Jones, Beaver). Bee won for Best Performance by a Female.

In 2023, Barry Hertz of The Globe and Mail named the film as one of the 23 best Canadian comedy films ever made.
