= Vancouver Film Critics Circle Awards 2007 =

Annual Canadian film awards ceremony

8th VFCC Awards

February 11, 2008

Best Film:
No Country for Old Men

Best Canadian Film:
Eastern Promises

The 8th Vancouver Film Critics Circle Awards, honoring the best in filmmaking in 2007, were given on February 11, 2008.

== Winners ==
=== International ===
- Best Actor:
  - Daniel Day-Lewis - There Will Be Blood
- Best Actress:
  - Marion Cotillard - La Vie en Rose (La môme)
- Best Director:
  - Ethan and Joel Coen - No Country for Old Men
- Best Film:
  - No Country for Old Men
- Best Foreign Language Film:
  - 4 Months, 3 Weeks and 2 Days • Romania
- Best Supporting Actor:
  - Javier Bardem - No Country for Old Men
- Best Supporting Actress:
  - Tilda Swinton - Michael Clayton

=== Canadian ===
- Best Actor:
  - Viggo Mortensen - Eastern Promises
- Best Actress:
  - Elliot Page (Note: Credited as Ellen Page; The Tracey Fragments was released before Page announced that he was transgender and non-binary.) - The Tracey Fragments
- Best British Columbia Film:
  - American Venus
- Best Director:
  - David Cronenberg - Eastern Promises
- Best Film:
  - Eastern Promises
- Best Supporting Actor:
  - Greg Bryk - Poor Boy's Game
- Best Supporting Actress:
  - Sonja Bennett - Young People Fucking
