= Samantha Bee =

Canadian-American comedic talk show host, actress and writer

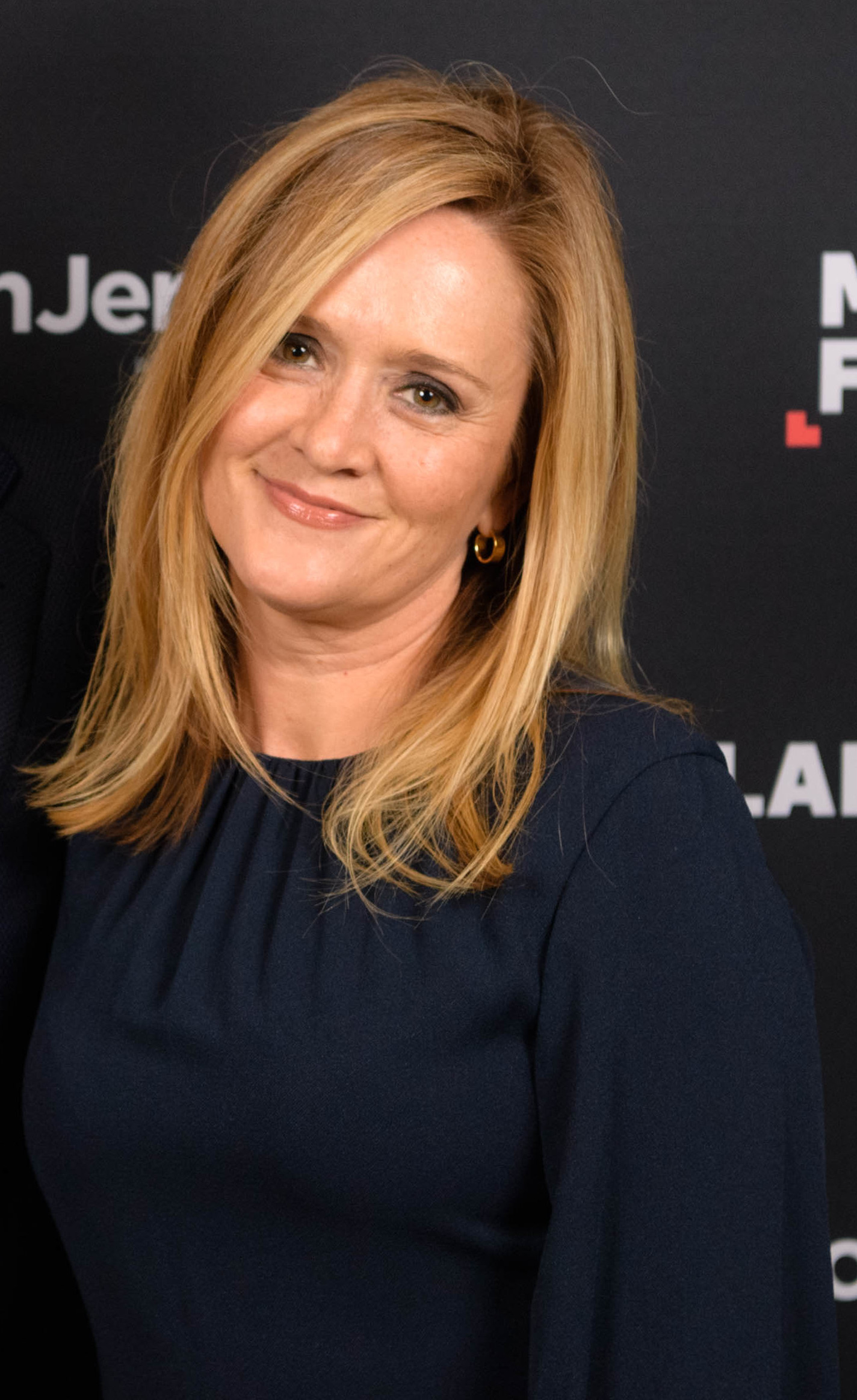
- Bee in December 2017
- Born: Samantha Anne Bee; October 25, 1969 (age 57); Toronto, Ontario, Canada
- Education: McGill University; University of Ottawa (BA); George Brown College
- Spouse: Jason Jones (m. 2001)
- Children: 3

Comedy career
- Years active: 2000–present
- Medium: Television; theatre; film; books
- Genres: Political/news satire; improvisational comedy; blue comedy; sarcasm; sketch comedy; surreal humor
- Subjects: American politics; Canadian culture; political punditry; popular culture; current events; mass media/news media; civil rights

Samantha Anne Bee (born October 25, 1969) is a Canadian-American comedian, writer, producer, political commentator, actress, and television host.

Bee rose to fame as a correspondent on The Daily Show with Jon Stewart, where she became the longest-serving regular correspondent. In 2015, she departed the show after 12 years to start her own show, Full Frontal with Samantha Bee. The show was canceled in 2022 as a "business-based decision" by TBS.

In 2017, Time named her one of the 100 most influential people in the world on their annual Time 100 list.

== Early life ==
Bee was born in Toronto, Ontario, the daughter of Debra and Ronald Bee. She has said of her family: "Dating from well before the turn of the 20th century, if there has ever been a successful, happy marriage in my family lineage, I've yet to hear about it." Bee's parents split up soon after her birth, and she was initially raised by her grandmother, who worked as a secretary at the Catholic school Bee attended, on Roncesvalles Avenue during her childhood. She attended Humberside Collegiate Institute and York Memorial Collegiate Institute.

After graduating from high school, Bee attended McGill University, where she studied humanities. Dissatisfied with a range of issues at the school, she transferred to the University of Ottawa after her first year. At the University of Ottawa, Bee signed up for a theatre class, thinking it would be easy. The class led to Bee discovering her love of performing. Bee later enrolled in the George Brown Theatre School in Toronto.

== Career ==
=== Career beginnings ===
Bee started auditioning for acting roles in Toronto while working as a waitress. At age 26, Bee toured with a stage production of Sailor Moon where she played the titular role. Bee performed in Sailor Moon's "A" cast and future husband Jason Jones was a member of the "B" cast.

Bee was one of the four founding members of Toronto-based sketch comedy troupe The Atomic Fireballs. The Fireballs were all women. Demonstrating mutual support, the group would try to perform as many of each other's ideas as they could.

=== 2003–2014: at The Daily Show ===
Bee became a correspondent for The Daily Show with Jon Stewart on July 10, 2003. Bee was the sole female correspondent on The Daily Show from her debut in 2003 until Kristen Schaal joined the show in March 2008. She was The Daily Show's first non-American citizen correspondent. On that program, Bee demonstrated an ability to coax people into caricaturing themselves—particularly in segments like "Kill Drill", on hunters and fossil fuel executives claiming to be environmentalists; "They So Horny?", on the dearth of Asian men in American pornography; "Tropical Repression", on Ed Heeney, a Florida politician running his campaign based on opposition to gay rights; "The Undecided", an over-the-top look at the undecided voters leading up to the 2004 US presidential elections; the "Samantha Bee's So You Want To Bee A..." report series, which humorously caricatured the way in which one can easily obtain a certain job, like becoming a 527 group; and a segment entitled "NILFs" ("News I'd Like to F#@k"), discussing the sexiness of news anchors: "CNN has the wholesome girl-next-door NILFs, the kind you can bring home to meet your mother. MSNBC has the dirty-over-30 NILFs. Fox has the filthy NILFs who will report anything. They're the Hustler of NILFs."

Bee had her first starring role in a feature film in 2004 with the Canadian independent film Ham & Cheese, co-written by her husband Jason Jones and starring Canadian comics Scott Thompson and Dave Foley. The film marked Bee's first starring role. She won a Canadian Comedy Award for "Pretty Funny Female Performance" for her role. Jones joined The Daily Show as a correspondent in 2005, two years after his wife. Jones became a freelance correspondent for the show while Bee reduced her workload during her pregnancy.

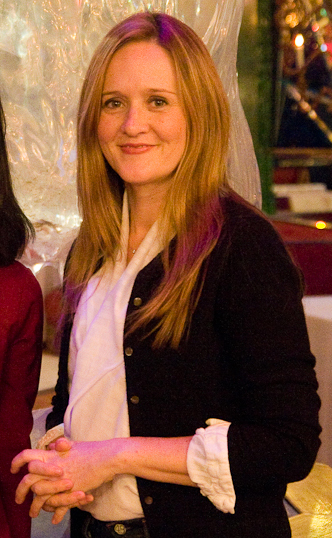
Bee at a Hudson Union Society event, 2011

In December 2005, on The O'Reilly Factor, Bill O'Reilly used a clip of Bee from The Daily Show as an example of "The War on Christmas", presenting it as having aired recently. The satirical clip featured Bee mentioning how Christmas was the only religious holiday that's also a federal holiday in the United States, with O'Reilly talking about "Secular Central...excuse me, Comedy Central". Jon Stewart responded on his show, inviting Bee out for a discussion, and unlike in the clip that aired on Factor, Bee was visibly eight months pregnant. Bee joked it was obvious that the footage O'Reilly showed was a year old (it originally aired in 2004) because she had different highlights in her hair, before stating that her water had just broken. Bee was recognized with a 2005 Canadian Comedy Award for Best Female TV Performance for her work on The Daily Show.

On January 20, 2008, Bee finished as the highest scoring celebrity in the CBC game show Test the Nation. She had a minor role in Episode 15, "Spy Something or Get Out", of Little Mosque on the Prairie. Bee also appeared in the 12th episode of Season 20 of Law & Order ("Blackmail", episode 445), which aired on January 15, 2010. She played a minor role in an episode of the HBO series Bored to Death. She appeared as herself on the "Madame President" episode of The Electric Company. Bee also did a guest voice role of a talk show hostess named Pam in the Season 2 finale of Bob's Burgers, in addition to providing the voice of Lyla Lolliberry for two episodes in Season 4 of Phineas and Ferb. She appeared on Sesame Street during Season 42 as Mother Goose. In 2009, Bee appeared in the original cast of Love, Loss, and What I Wore. That same year, she had a small role in the comedy Whatever Works, written and directed by Woody Allen.

Bee authored a book titled I Know I Am, But What Are You?, which was published in 2010. She became the longest-serving regular Daily Show correspondent after passing Stephen Colbert's record in 2011. The same year, Bee collaborated with her longtime friend Allana Harkin on the parenting blog "Eating Over the Sink" for the online magazine Babble. In 2012, she appeared in Ken Finkleman's series Good God as Shandy Sommers, a devoutly Christian cable news host. She has also played roles in the series Bounty Hunters and Game On. In 2014, Bee was a panellist on Canada Reads, the CBC's annual national book debate. She defended Rawi Hage's novel Cockroach. On October 7, 2014, in the absence of Jon Stewart, she co-hosted The Daily Show with Jones.

=== 2015–2022: Full Frontal with Samantha Bee ===
In March 2015, it was announced that she would leave The Daily Show – after 12 years – to host her own satirical news show on TBS. Bee departed The Daily Show on April 30, 2015. Her new show, Full Frontal with Samantha Bee, debuted on February 8, 2016. With the program's debut, Bee became the first woman to host a late-night satire show. Bee also tried to implement a hiring process which would give her show a more diverse staff than what is typical for a late night comedy show. The first season of Full Frontal generated critical acclaim and in November 2016, the show was renewed for a second season throughout 2017.

Bee is an executive producer of the TBS comedy series The Detour (2016–2019), which she created with her husband, Jason Jones. One year into Bee's run on Full Frontal, Time named Bee one of the 100 most influential people in the world. On April 29, 2017, Full Frontal with Samantha Bee hosted "Not the White House Correspondents' Dinner" which aired on TBS the same evening. In July 2017, Bee's "Nasty Woman Shirt" campaign raised over $1 million for Planned Parenthood. In January 2018, TBS renewed Full Frontal for a third and fourth season, set to air through 2020. Bee's deal with Turner runs through 2022.

In 2018, Bee faced backlash on social media and from the White House for calling Ivanka Trump a "feckless cunt", while criticizing her stance as a mother regarding the immigration policy of Donald Trump. The comments were made in the context of highlighting the administration's actions on immigration and the separation of undocumented children from their parents. Critics on Twitter started a hashtag calling for a boycott of TBS network until Bee's show is canceled. The day after the segment aired, Bee apologized and "deeply [regretted]" the comment. Comedians Kathy Griffin, Michelle Wolf, Sarah Silverman, and Jon Stewart defended Bee, with Stewart suggesting much of the outrage over the joke was strategic rather than genuine. The show featured fewer national advertisements the following week. Bee began the episode with an apology to any women she had offended and lamenting that one bad word had overshadowed the policy of detaining undocumented immigrant children which she had been criticizing.

In 2018, Bee formed a production company called Swimsuit Competition, focused on creating original content for television, aiming to work with underrepresented talent and those whose work has been underestimated in the past. The company signed a first-look deal with TBS. Full Frontal producer Kristen Everman was named head of development.

She appeared as Jillian on the revived The Kids in the Hall, released in May 2022.

On July 25, 2022, Bee's representatives announced that TBS had not renewed Full Frontal for a seventh season.

=== 2022– : further career ===
In 2023, Bee was named as the host of the 11th Canadian Screen Awards broadcast on April 16. In 2024, Bee starred in the off-Broadway one-woman show How to Survive Menopause. The show was later adapted as an Audible Original.

Since 2023, Bee has hosted the podcast Choice Words with Samantha Bee, produced by Lemonada Media. Guests have included Jon Lovett, Jennifer Welch, Stephen J. Dubner, and Chris Hayes.

== Influences ==
Bee has credited Jon Stewart as one of her major influences, and in several interviews she has said that her other comedic influences include Steve Martin, David Letterman, Mary Tyler Moore, Lucille Ball, Carol Burnett, Betty White, and Joan Rivers.

== Personal life ==
In 2001, Bee married actor and writer Jason Jones, whom she first met in 1996. They reside in Manhattan, New York. In January 2006, she gave birth to her first child, a daughter named Piper, then returned to The Daily Show in March 2006. On January 24, 2008, Bee announced a second pregnancy on air during a bit about the media's coverage of the 2008 presidential campaign, and gave birth to their second child, a son named Fletcher, later that year. Their third child, a daughter named Ripley, was born in late 2010. During her third pregnancy, Bee joked she and Jones were "just procreating like we're farmers."

Bee holds dual Canadian-American citizenship after being naturalized in 2014.

== Filmography ==
=== Film ===
Year	Title	Role	Notes
2004	Ham & Cheese	Beth Goodson	
2007	Underdog	Principal Helen Patterson	
2008	Coopers' Camera	Nancy Cooper	Won the Canadian Comedy Award for Best Performance by a Female in a Film at the 10th Canadian Comedy Awards
2008	The Love Guru	Cinnabon Cashier	
2009	Whatever Works	Chess Mother	
2009	Motherhood	Alison Hopper	
2010	Date Night	Woman in Times Square	Uncredited
2010	Furry Vengeance	Principal Baker	
2014	Learning to Drive	Debbie	
2015	Get Squirrely	Raitch (voice)	aka A.C.O.R.N.S.: Operation Crackdown
2015	Sisters	Liz	
2018	Elliot the Littlest Reindeer	Hazel (voice)	
2023	Judy Blume Forever	Herself	Documentary

=== Television ===
Year	Title	Role	Notes
2000	Real Kids, Real Adventures	Neighbour	Episode: "Explosion: The Christopher Wise Story"
2001	The Endless Grind		
2003–2015	The Daily Show with Jon Stewart	Herself (correspondent)	332 episodes
2003	Jasper, Texas	Kathy	Television film
2005	Odd Job Jack	Linda Callahan (voice)	Episode: "Law and Lawless"
2006	Love Monkey	Carol Dulac – Letterman Booker	Episode: "The One That Got Away"
2007	Not This But This	Various	Also co-producer
2007	Little Mosque on the Prairie	Nancy Layton	Episode: "Spy Something or Get Out"
2007	Rescue Me	Real Estate Agent	Episode: "Animal"
2007	Two Families		Television film
2009–2011	Bored to Death	Renee Dalton	3 episodes
2010	Law & Order	Vanessa Carville	Episode: "Blackmail"
2010	Love Letters	Melissa	Television film
2010–2012	Sesame Street	Mother Goose	2 episodes
2011	Michael: Tuesdays and Thursdays	Nancy Slade	Episode: "Sweating"
2012	Good God	Shandy Sommers	9 episodes
2012–2017	Bob's Burgers	Pam, Nurse Liz (voice)	4 episodes
2013	Bounty Hunters	Stacy (voice)	13 episodes
2013–2014	Phineas and Ferb	Lyla Lolliberry (voice)	2 episodes
2013–2017	Creative Galaxy	Mom (voice)	22 episodes
2014	The Michael J. Fox Show	Dr. Young	Episode: "Surprise"
2014	Deadbeat	Darcy	2 episodes
2015	Halal in the Family	Wendy	Episode: "The Amazing Race"
2015–2016	Game On	Geri	25 episodes
2016–2022	Full Frontal with Samantha Bee	Herself (host)	218 episodes; also creator, writer, executive producer
2016–2019	The Detour	Nate's Mother	2 episodes
2017	The History of Comedy	Herself	2 episodes
2020	BoJack Horseman	Herself (voice)	Episode: "The Horny Unicorn"
2020	Blue's Clues & You!	Herself	Episode: "Happy Birthday, Blue!"
2021	Robot Chicken	Barbara, Sadness (voice)	Episode: "May Cause a Whole Lotta Scabs"
2022	The Kids in the Hall	Jillian	Episode 5
2024	Canada's Drag Race: Canada vs. the World	Herself (guest judge)	Season 2, Episode 4: "Reading Battles"

==== As crew member ====
Year	Title	Notes
2016–2019	The Detour	Co-creator, writer, executive producer
2020	It's Personal with Amy Hoggart	Executive producer

== Stage ==
Year	Title	Role	Venue	Ref.
2009	Love, Loss, and What I Wore	—N/a	Westside Theatre	

== Published works ==
- America (The Book): A Citizen's Guide to Democracy Inaction. Warner Books. 2004. ISBN 978-0-446-53268-6.
- Bee, Samantha (2010). I Know I Am, But What Are You?. Gallery Books. ISBN 978-1-4391-4273-8.
- Bee, Samantha (2016). Cracking Up. Farrar, Straus and Giroux. ISBN 978-0-374-30199-6.

== Awards and nominations ==
Year	Award	Category	Work	Result	Ref.
2005	Canadian Comedy Awards	Film – Pretty Funny Performance – Female	Ham & Cheese	Nominated	
2005	Canadian Comedy Awards	Television – Pretty Funny Female Performance	The Daily Show with Jon Stewart	Won	
2009	Canadian Comedy Awards	Best Performance by a Female – Film	Coopers' Camera	Won	
2012	Canadian Comedy Awards	Best Performance by a Female – Television	Good God	Nominated	
2013	Canadian Screen Awards	Best Performance by an Actress in a Featured Supporting Role or Guest Role in a Comedic Series	Good God	Nominated	
2015	Canadian Comedy Awards	Canadian Comedy Person of the Year	—N/a	Won	
2016	Women's Media Center	History Making Award	—N/a	Won	
2016	Television Critics Association Awards	Outstanding Achievement in News and Information	Full Frontal with Samantha Bee	Won	
2016	Television Critics Association Awards	Individual Achievement in Comedy	Full Frontal with Samantha Bee	Nominated	
2016	Primetime Emmy Award	Outstanding Writing for a Variety Series	Full Frontal with Samantha Bee	Nominated	
2016	Critics' Choice Television Award	Best Talk Show	Full Frontal with Samantha Bee	Nominated	
2017	Producers Guild of America Awards	Outstanding Producer of Live Entertainment & Talk Television	Full Frontal with Samantha Bee	Nominated	
2017	Dorian Awards	TV Current Affairs Show of the Year	Full Frontal with Samantha Bee	Won	
2017	Dorian Awards	Wilde Wit of the Year	Full Frontal with Samantha Bee	Nominated	
2017	Gracie Awards	On-Air Talent – Entertainment or Sports	Full Frontal with Samantha Bee	Won	
2017	Shorty Awards	Best Comedian	Full Frontal with Samantha Bee	Nominated	
2017	MTV Movie & TV Awards	Best Host	Full Frontal with Samantha Bee	Nominated	
2017	Television Critics Association Awards	Outstanding Achievement in News and Information	Full Frontal with Samantha Bee	Nominated	
2017	Primetime Emmy Award	Outstanding Variety Talk Series	Full Frontal with Samantha Bee	Nominated	
2017	Primetime Emmy Award	Outstanding Writing for a Variety Series	Full Frontal with Samantha Bee	Nominated	
2017	Primetime Emmy Award	Outstanding Variety Special	Full Frontal with Samantha Bee	Nominated	
2017	Primetime Emmy Award	Outstanding Writing for a Variety Special	Full Frontal with Samantha Bee	Won	
2018	Producers Guild of America Award	Outstanding Producer of Live Entertainment & Talk Television	Full Frontal with Samantha Bee	Nominated	
2018	Dorian Awards	TV Current Affairs Show of the Year	Full Frontal with Samantha Bee	Won	
2018	Dorian Awards	Wilde Wit of the Year	Full Frontal with Samantha Bee	Nominated	
2018	Writers Guild of America Award	Comedy/Variety – Talk Series	Full Frontal with Samantha Bee	Nominated	
2018	Gracie Awards	Special	Full Frontal with Samantha Bee	Won	
2018	Academy of Television Arts & Sciences	Television Academy Honor	Full Frontal with Samantha Bee	Won	
2018	Canadian Comedy Awards	Comedic Artist of the Year	Full Frontal with Samantha Bee	Nominated	
2018	Television Critics Association Awards	Outstanding Achievement in Sketch/Variety Shows	Full Frontal with Samantha Bee	Nominated	
2018	Primetime Emmy Award	Outstanding Variety Talk Series	Full Frontal with Samantha Bee	Nominated	
2018	Primetime Emmy Award	Outstanding Variety Special	Full Frontal with Samantha Bee	Nominated	
2018	Primetime Emmy Award	Outstanding Writing for a Variety Series	Full Frontal with Samantha Bee	Nominated	
2018	Primetime Emmy Award	Outstanding Writing for a Variety Special	Full Frontal with Samantha Bee	Nominated	
2018	Primetime Emmy Award	Outstanding Interactive Program	Full Frontal with Samantha Bee	Nominated	
2019	Dorian Awards	TV Current Affairs Show of the Year	Full Frontal with Samantha Bee	Won	
2019	Dorian Awards	Wilde Wit of the Year	Full Frontal with Samantha Bee	Nominated	
2019	Writers Guild of America Award	Comedy/Variety – Talk Series	Full Frontal with Samantha Bee	Nominated	
2019	GLAAD Media Award	Outstanding Variety or Talk Show Episode (Note: For the episode:"Trans Rights Under Attack")	Full Frontal with Samantha Bee	Won	
2019	Television Critics Association Awards	Outstanding Achievement in Sketch/Variety Shows	Full Frontal with Samantha Bee	Nominated	
2019	Primetime Emmy Awards	Outstanding Variety Talk Series	Full Frontal with Samantha Bee	Nominated	
2019	Primetime Emmy Awards	Outstanding Writing for a Variety Series	Full Frontal with Samantha Bee	Nominated	
2019	People's Choice Awards	The Nighttime Talk Show of 2019	Full Frontal with Samantha Bee	Nominated	
2020	Dorian Awards	TV Current Affairs Show of the Year	Full Frontal with Samantha Bee	Nominated	
2020	Critics' Choice Television Award	Best Talk Show	Full Frontal with Samantha Bee	Nominated	
2020	Writers Guild of America Award	Comedy/Variety – Talk Series	Full Frontal with Samantha Bee	Nominated	
2020	Writers Guild of America Award	Comedy/Variety – Specials	Full Frontal with Samantha Bee	Won	
