= The Girl's Guide to Depravity =

- Genre: Comedy
- Created by: Heather Rutman
- Based on: the blog The Girl's Guide to Depravity by Heather Rutman
- Written by: Chloe Danger; Jess Roman; Rebecca Coale; a.o.
- Directed by: Alex Merkin
- Starring: Rebecca Blumhagen; Sally Golan
- Composer: Bobby Tahouri
- Country of origin: United States
- Original language: English
- No. of seasons: 2
- No. of episodes: 26

Production
- Executive producers: Steve Beswick; Jon Kramer; Lee Kramer; Florian Lechner; Joachim Sturmes
- Cinematography: Thomas Callaway
- Production company: HBO Entertainment

Original release
- Network: Cinemax
- Release: February 24, 2012 – December 13, 2013

The Girl's Guide to Depravity is a softcore comedy/drama series based on Heather Rutman's popular blog of the same name. The show debuted in the United States on Cinemax in February 2012 and has aired internationally in Latin America (HBO), Spain (Cuatro), Canada (IFC), and Japan (Dentsu).

== Premise ==
Based on a blog, The Girl's Guide to Depravity is about two women, Lizzie (Sally Golan) and Samantha (Rebecca Blumhagen) and the rules they use to have fun and avoid being hurt in relationships.

== Cast and characters ==
- Rebecca Blumhagen - Samantha
- Sally Golan - Lizzie
- Tessa Harnetiaux - Megan (Season 2)
- Megan Barrick - Jenna (Season 2)
- Nicole Rodenburg - Amy (Season 2)
- Jesse Liebman - Jason
- Nick Clark - Dean
- Blake Lowell - Charlie
- Kirk Barker - Ben
- Joe Komara - Tyler
- Chasty Ballesteros - Rachel (Season 2)
- Kirsten Koppe - Carrie
- Jeff Takacs - Blair
- Margaret Keane Williams - Kate
- Jesse Pepe - Ryan
- Susannah Allman - Beth
- Topher Mikels - Dirty Hot Guy
- Kyle Knies - Drew
- Riley Steele - Kaylie
- Victoria Atkin - Camilla
- Christina Collard - Pill Pusher Penni

== Episode list ==
=== Season 1 (2012) ===
No. overall	No. in season	Title	Directed by	Written by	Original release date
1	1	"The Break-Up Rule"	Unknown	Unknown	February 24, 2012
We are introduced to Lizzie and Sam. After Sam's recent breakup with three-date Brad, they go to a club and look for men. While there, Sam meets an ideal man. Likewise, Lizzie meets "Dirty Hot Guy", but it goes wrong and she is then interrupted by her ex-boyfriend Drew entering the bar. Later she encounters the same man at the dive bar they were at and takes him home.
2	2	"The Last Woman Standing Rule"	Unknown	Unknown	March 2, 2012
Sam waits outside Richard's apartment so she can see him when he comes home. She declines his offer to come inside, and is admonished by Lizzie for doing so. This is a violation of the "Last woman standing rule". Sam continues to follow Richard, stalking him on "Flutter" to find his whereabouts. While she is in the bathroom, he leaves the party. Lizzie is undercover to prove sexual harassment, but seduces the wrong man. This leaves Sam alone at a bar with Richard and Morgan. Richard goes home with her but is too drunk and passes out.
3	3	"The Puma Rule"	Alex Markin	Jess Roman	March 9, 2012
The girls wind up at a Mexican bar on college night after Richard cancels a date with Lizzie. The ladies then pick up some prep school grads who are pretending to be college students. Lizzie and one of the students have sex, but Sam has no such luck. Her man of the night suffers from premature ejaculation. Jason is shown Nicole's true colors while at the market, but pays no attention and winds up drinking with Lizzie and Sam.
4	4	"The Vibrator Rule"	Unknown	Unknown	March 16, 2012
Sam's casual sex partner is distracted by the sound of the neighbors also having sex. Lizzie brings up the introduction of a vibrator to fix the distraction. Sam's co-worker, Kate, can't wait to have sex with Jared. Meanwhile, Lizzie is flirting with a clerk. Sam's old-fashioned AC vibrator plug is too short. Kate's anticipation is dashed when her feelings are not reciprocated. The clerk's penis is not large enough for Lizzie. Sam's new, battery powered vibrator lacks the stamina. She gets the plug-in one from the trash and is finally satisfied.
5	5	"The Bitch Rule"	Unknown	Unknown	March 23, 2012
The drunken duo are at the dive bar again when an even ruder woman, Mariposa, scares their friend Jason into buying a drink for her. The ladies overhear her having a conversation on her phone, and come to the realization that she is really a normal girl who has learned that being bitchy gets her what she wants. They have coffee and talk. A challenge is issued: may the biggest bitch win. Sam uses the new technique to seduce Ryan, a bike messenger. He vanishes when she shows him she is really a nice girl. Mariposa wins out over Lizzie, taking Walter with her. Lizzie is involved in a debacle when she cuts the tag off a dress of a woman who wouldn't tell her where she bought it. It turns out to be from a plus-sized store. Dirty Hot Guy appears to provide Lizzie with silent companionship.
6	6	"The Magic Pussy Rule"	Unknown	Unknown	March 30, 2012
Sam and Lizzie encounter an older, normal looking woman with a good looking young man and speculate she has a "magic pussy", which cannot be defined. The girls attend a Tantric Yoga class in an attempt to learn techniques, but are thrown out for snickering. They look into a Korean steam treatment which turns out to be a holistic fertility treatment. A bartender reveals she lost her magic pussy after having a child. Their gay friend Tyler says maybe it's a "magic mouth", and relates a story from college. Dirty Hot Guy appears and reveals the secret of the magic pussy; confidence. His older date arrives, and is not threatened seeing him talking to Lizzie. Sam wonders if her ex, Drew, is happy with his new younger girlfriend.
7	7	"The Fuck Buddy Rule"	Alex Merkin	Jess Roman	April 6, 2012
Lizzie is concerned that Sam and Danny had sex during the day. She views it as Sam falling for a casual sex partner. This is a violation of the rules. Kaylie, another girl is introduced and is dating her fuck buddy, which she doesn't see as a problem. Sam ponders the consequences of attempting the same. Kate doesn't believe casual sex is good, but changes her tune when dumped by her boyfriend. Danny invites Sam out for a movie and dinner and later dumps her as he says he was keeping dating and sex separate. Sam takes pity on herself with a pint of ice cream. Kaylie and Jordan are overheard having odd role-play sex. Sam can't stand it and goes to the dive bar. She tells Lizzie and Tyler about it, who leave her alone to go to a fetish club.
8	8	"The Cheating Rule"	Unknown	Unknown	April 13, 2012
Kaylie joins Sam and Lizzie at the dive bar. They see someone who looks like Kaylie's boyfriend pick up a blonde. Kaylie is hurt. The girls offer comfort and explain that all men cheat, she should, too. They stalk him to the gym and breakfast. Later that night they see someone looking like him go to his apartment with the blonde. Sam tricks Brad to let them into his apartment so they can continue to spy. Sam stays behind to have sex with and to dump Brad, while Lizzie leaves. They share their information with Kaylie and tell her it is time to confront him. Kaylie makes Jordan jealous by going to the bar with Tyrone. They find out Jordan moved, and was not cheating. Tyrone winds up with the blonde, Jason shows that the rules don't work, and Sam has to listen to Kaylie and Jordan having sex through the wall again.
9	9	"The Bi-Guy Rule"	Unknown	Unknown	April 20, 2012
Tyler, Sam and Lizzie go to a gay bar where they talk about Sam's desire for unattainable men. Lizzie gets drunk and flirts with Mark who is gay, but takes him home and has sex with him anyway. This leads the girls to wonder how to tell if a man is gay. Sam is interested in a new co-worker but is getting mixed signals about his sexual orientation. She stalks his computer search history. They throw a party for a tattoo parlor owned by Fiona. Sam brings Tyler to try and read Devon, the questionable co-worker, but neither can figure it out. They find out he pretends to be gay to get women. Tyler reaffirms his homosexuality, stating that even though he had sex with Fiona, he is still gay.
10	10	"The Unavailable Rule"	Unknown	Unknown	April 27, 2012
Sienna visits Sam and Lizzie, and brings along a theory that men can't resist a taken woman. Lizzie gives in to Marco's advances for one last spin. Sienna decides they should go after the weaker of Sam's crushes. This is Jason. They hack his email and stalk him to a date, but their plan to distract and separate him from his date fail. Instead they watch him have sex through the window. Lizzie comes clean to Marco, telling him she isn't engaged. He counters with his own revelation: he's married. Sienna goes home. Sam bumps into Lulu, who was Jason's date on purpose. Sam tells her what a good man she has. This causes Lulu to dump him.
11	11	"The Pill Rule"	Unknown	Unknown	May 4, 2012
Sam's depression and anger bothers Lizzie, so she refers her to "Dr. Feelgood" who prescribes anxiety and depression medication. Sam resents the diagnosis and says she only needs something to help her concentrate. Lizzie connects her with Patty who trades the prescriptions for uppers. Sam soon runs out of pills, so Lizzie arranges another meeting with Patty at a party. At the party, Drew and Richard both show up. Sam goes straight to Patty for the pills and later takes a drunken Richard home with her. Lizzie encounters Drew who is sad because his new girlfriend is cheating. After he hides in a bedroom, Pill Patty has sex with him. Lizzie walks in on this and realizes she is the only one who hasn't hooked up. At Sam's apartment, Richard passes out in bed with an erection.
12	12	"The Getting His Attention Rule"	Unknown	Unknown	May 11, 2012
Sienna reappears in the city because she won't talk to her husband until he apologizes for reading in the bathroom. Sienna decides to show the girls how to get a man's attention. Her aggressiveness is not welcome by a man at the bar and he arrests her. Sienna didn't know he was a police officer. Sam thinks that if they keep following Sienna's rules, they will be permanently alone. Sam talks to Kate to see about having Kate's lawyer boyfriend get Sienna released. Sienna's husband sees her in jail. She apologizes to him and agrees to stop sabotaging their marriage. Sherman tries to get Kate to agree to ten dates in one day so they can have sex after. Sam prints Sienna's rules and questions some of them. Lizzie does not want to give any of them up. Sienna is released into the custody of her husband. They have sex in the jail visiting room.
13	13	"The Revenge Rule"	Unknown	Unknown	May 18, 2012
Sam and Lizzie disagree over going to drinks with Drew. Sam knows it will be another make-up and break-up. It turns out Drew only wants some parking tickets fixed by Lizzie's friend at the DMV. Drew has made up with his girlfriend. Jason bumps into Sam, and she tells him she is attracted to him. This works out since Lulu dumped him. Before Sam goes out with Jason, Lizzie calls them to Drew's apartment. She has arranged to have Drew's car booted in revenge and end the relationship. The girls drink to NO MORE rules. Lizzie introduces herself to Dirty Hot Guy. Sam chooses Jason over Richard. Sam is scared that she is falling for Jason and leaves, thinking it may have been a mistake.

=== Season 2 (2013) ===
No. overall	No. in season	Title	Directed by	Written by	Original release date
14	1	"The Girl on Girl Rule"	Unknown	Unknown	September 13, 2013
Lizzie and Sam face a major crossroads in their friendship. Two new possible "depraved" disciples arrive on the scene: Sam's neighbor, Megan, and an old party pal, Jenna. Megan goes too far to please a date she met online. Jenna uses revenge sex to settle a score.
15	2	"The Do Me Rule"	Unknown	Unknown	September 20, 2013
Jason tries to get Sam out of her Lizzie-less funk. Megan becomes a "bad girl" to snag a "bad boy." Jenna's ex begs forgiveness and she gives him one night to make him forget about all the women who came before her.
16	3	"The Bar Sex Rule"	Unknown	Unknown	September 27, 2013
Sam makes a bet with her womanizing workmate, Dean. Jenna finds a sext on Ben's phone. Megan tries out The Rules of Depravity with a handsome client. Jason confronts Sam about her strange behavior.
17	4	"The Morning After Rule"	Unknown	Unknown	October 4, 2013
Sam and Jason debate whether to contact each other after breaking up. Rachel mixes business with pleasure. After a unique first date, Sam is surprised by a visitor.
18	5	"The Get Under Another Rule"	Unknown	Unknown	October 11, 2013
Ben takes romance to another level for his and Jenna's 5-year anniversary. Sam and her new classmate have a night that leaves his apartment in shambles. Jason gets lucky with a new approach. Rachel learns that size doesn't matter. Meg deals with a flirty client. Tyler gets himself a sexy new bartender.
19	6	"The F*ck Yes Rule"	Unknown	Unknown	October 18, 2013
When Sam realizes she is the only one of the gang who has never kissed a girl, Amy decides to take her and the ladies out to the local lesbian bar. Dean teaches Charlie the 'guy code.' Charlie goes on the prowl and runs into Megan, while Jenna finds a big surprise at home.
20	7	"The Hos Before Bros Rule"	Unknown	Unknown	October 25, 2013
Megan and Charlie give in to their mutual attraction -- several times -- despite Sam's disapproval. Sam enlists a pissed-off and single-again Jenna in a plan to bring Dean down while Ben asks Dean to keep Jenna occupied until he can win her back. Sam gets sage 'Rules' advice from Lizzie about Ryan, and Amy's hot one night stand shows up at The Bootleg.
21	8	"The Basic Instincts Rule"	Unknown	Unknown	November 1, 2013
Megan feels guilty about her hot new guy -- who isn't Charlie. Tyler needs a wife fast or he faces deportation, but first the gang needs to butch him up. Ben makes a confession and asks for Jenna's help. Jenna and Dean have started something they can't seem to stop, and Sam avoids defining her relationship with Ryan.
22	9	"The Wingwoman Rule"	Unknown	Unknown	November 8, 2013
Megan is affected by a dream about Charlie. Sam makes a friend at a sex-addict session. Amy becomes Carrie's roommate, and Jason experiences an unseen side of Rachel.
23	10	"The Breakup Sex Rule"	Unknown	Unknown	November 15, 2013
Sam believes she will achieve closure if she has breakup sex with Jason. Tyler and Pill Pusher Penni are on a quest for domestic bliss, while Amy and Carrie face domestic stress; and Jason and Rachel close a big deal.
24	11	"The Back Door Rule"	Unknown	Unknown	November 22, 2013
Ryan helps Sam spy on Jason. A business merger leads to a personal merger for Jason and Rachel. Megan meets an attractive florist while organizing Tyler's wedding, and Tyler and Penni are interviewed by immigration authorities.
25	12	"The Breaking and Entering Rule"	Unknown	Unknown	December 6, 2013
Sam intensifies her pursuit of Ryan. Rachel begins to warm up to Jason after their personal encounter. Sam tutors Megan in the art of stalking, and Jenna recruits Dean for a revenge plan.
26	13	"The Coming Together Rule"	Unknown	Unknown	December 13, 2013
Dean helps Megan boost her confidence. Ryan provides an RSVP to Sam's love letter. Dean requests a real date with Jenna, and a surprise wedding draws some surprise guests.
