= The Detour (TV series) =

American sitcom (2016–2019)

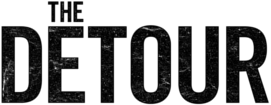
- Genre: Sitcom
- Created by: Jason Jones; Samantha Bee
- Starring: Jason Jones; Natalie Zea; Ashley Gerasimovich; Liam Carroll; Daniella Pineda; Mary Grill; Laura Benanti
- Composer: Rob Kolar
- Country of origin: United States
- Original language: English
- No. of seasons: 4
- No. of episodes: 42

Production
- Executive producers: Jason Jones; Samantha Bee; Brennan Shroff; Tony Hernandez (season 2)
- Producers: Larry Rapaport (Pilot); Matthew Spiegel (season 1); David Bausch (season 2)
- Production locations: Georgia (season 1); New York (season 2); Alberta (season 3)
- Editor: Edward Chin
- Camera setup: Single-camera
- Running time: 22 minutes
- Production companies: TBS Productions (season 1); Randy & Pam's Quality Entertainment (seasons 2–4); Jax Media (seasons 2–3); Studio T (seasons 2–3); Nomadic Pictures (seasons 3–4)

Original release
- Network: TBS
- Release: April 11, 2016 – August 20, 2019

The Detour is an American sitcom that was created by Jason Jones and Samantha Bee about a family vacation road trip that quickly devolves out of control. It stars Jones himself, Natalie Zea, Ashley Gerasimovich, Liam Carroll, Daniella Pineda, Mary Grill, and Laura Benanti. The series aired on TBS from April 11, 2016, to August 20, 2019. The show was renewed for a second season on April 6, 2016, five days prior to the series premiere. The second season premiered on February 21, 2017. On April 25, 2017, TBS renewed the series for a third season.

On May 11, 2018, the series was renewed for a fourth season, which premiered on June 18, 2019. On September 4, 2019, TBS canceled the series after four seasons.

== Plot ==
The series follows Nate Parker, Jr., his wife Robin Randall, and their kids, preteen twins Delilah and Jared, as they drive from their home in Syracuse, New York, to Florida for a family vacation. The trip experiences several dramatic delays such as car trouble, run-ins with law enforcement, unforeseen medical mishaps, and intervening locals. Nate had caused some professional trouble before leaving Syracuse and has ulterior motives for the Florida trip, which fuels flashbacks and a framing device involving several law-enforcement agencies and an interrogation into his unspecified crimes.

In season 2, the family settles in New York City as Nate finds a new career but more trouble as pieces of Robin's past resurface, including her relationship with her father, wanted felon J.R. Randall. The framing device presents the couple being interrogated by the United States Postal Inspection Service as an attempt to get at J.R., led by the overzealous (and very pregnant) Agent Edie.

In season 3, the family flees to Alaska. This time the framing device involves Nate and Robin discussing their case with their lawyer, Joe Delicious. Jared becomes mayor of the town they settle in, Nate works on a fishing boat, and Robin becomes a stripper.

In season 4, Delilah flees the rest of the Parkers as they try to track her down. This takes them to Tibet, Japan, New Zealand, and eventually back home to New York where she has apparently been the entire time. The season, and the series, ends with Nate apparently having gone off the grid, as he checks months of voice mail messages left for him. He then climbs into a van, which is immediately riddled with bullets and explodes; since the series was canceled shortly after the episode aired, Nate's fate is left unknown.

== Cast ==
- Jason Jones as Nate Parker Jr.
- Natalie Zea as Robin Randall and Bluejay "B.J." Randall
- Ashley Gerasimovich as Delilah Parker
- Liam Carroll as Jared (Jerob) Parker
- Daniella Pineda as Vanessa Randall (season 1–3; voice only season 4)
- Mary Grill as Federal Agent Mary (season 1; guest season 2)
- Laura Benanti as USPIS Agent Edie Randall (season 3; recurring season 2; voice only season 4)

=== Recurring ===
- Phil Reeves as Gene
- Jeffrey Vincent Parise as Carlos (Season 2)
- Tom Amandes as Dr. Rob (Season 1)
- Judge Reinhold as Davey (Season 1)
- Maz Jobrani as Gupta (Season 1)
- Weronika Rosati as Oksana (Season 1)
- Wayne Caparas as Lobsong (Season 1)
- James Cromwell as Jack "J.R." Randall (Seasons 2 and 4)
- Mamoudou Athie as USPIS Agent Carl (Season 2)
- Max Casella as Joe Delicious (Season 2–3)
- Darin Cooper as ICE Agent (Season 1)
- Vince Foster as USDA Agent (Season 1)
- Deja Dee as DEA Agent (Season 1)
- Taylor Kowalski as Billy Evans (Season 1)
- Adam Boyer as Morris (Season 1)
- Denitra Isler as Latisha (Season 1)
- Mary Kraft as Shelly
- Angelina Lewis as Svetlana (Season 1)
- Paul Cuneo as Carl (Season 1)
- Sebastian Greco as Caleb (Season 1)
- Britt Rentschler as Melissa (Season 1)
- Samuel Vielma as Marco (Season 1)
- Jonathan D. Williams as Paul (Season 1)
- Jenna Bryant as Rebecca (Season 1)
- Jeff Blumenkrantz as Lars (Season 2)
- Teddy Canez as Conrad (Season 2)
- Donshea Hopkins as Chase (Season 2)
- Marceline Hugot as Judith (Season 2)
- Catrina Ganey as Judge (Season 2)
- Meredith Henderhan as Stenographer (Season 2)
- Saverio Guerra as Paddy Greenberg (Season 2)
- Paloma Guzman as Carlita (Season 2)
- Perry Yung as Zhi (Season 2)
- Erik King as Harris (Season 2)
- Jocelyn Bioh as Isabel
- Ezra Romanov (Season 2)
- Kevin Townley as Martin (Season 2)
- Akira Ito as IRS Drone (Season 2)
- Jim Santangeli as SWAT Officer (Season 2)
- Amy Shiels as Nicole (Season 2)
- Souleymane Sy Savane as African Man (Season 2)
- Dave Hanson as Agent Randy (Season 2)
- Richard Nwaoko as Bobby (Season 2)
- Fletcher Bee-Jones as Young Nate
- Samantha Bee as Nate's Mother
- Rebecca Koon as Nate's Mother (Older)
- Caitlynne Medrek as Nurse (Season 3)
- Blaine Schlechter as Janitor (Season 3)
- Christina Collard as Naomi (Season 2)

== Development ==
TBS ordered the pilot, written by Jason Jones and Samantha Bee, in October 2014. The show is based on the real life couple's own experience with family vacations.

It was picked up for ten episodes in February 2015. On April 6, 2016, the show was renewed for a second season before the premiere.

== Episodes ==
Season	Episodes	Originally released	
Season	Episodes	First released	Last released
1	10	April 11, 2016	May 30, 2016
2	12	February 21, 2017	April 25, 2017
3	10	January 23, 2018	March 27, 2018
4	10	June 18, 2019	August 20, 2019

=== Season 1 (2016) ===
No. overall	No. in season	Title	Directed by	Written by	Original release date	Prod. code	U.S. viewers (millions)
1	1	"The Pilot"	Steve Pink	Jason Jones & Samantha Bee	April 11, 2016	101	1.166
Nate, Robin, and their kids are headed from Syracuse to Ft. Lauderdale in a janky minivan instead of flying. Among truckers, aggressive drivers, and roadside breakfast spots, the family learns that nothing on the road is what it seems.
2	2	"The Hotel"	Steve Pink	Jason Jones	April 11, 2016	102	1.043
"Blue Thunder," the family van, must be repaired overnight after being driven into a ditch, so the Parkers are parked at nearby motel Swift Stay Suites.
3	3	"The Tank"	Steve Pink	Mike Beaver	April 18, 2016	103	0.841
The Parkers are barely back on the road when Nate gets pulled over for driving under the influence. He's completely sober but somehow some jail time is still involved.
4	4	"The Restaurant"	Brennan Shroff	Jason Jones	April 25, 2016	104	0.863
Back on the road, the Parkers begrudgingly stop to eat at a nauseatingly culturally-insensitive roadside restaurant and dinner theater called Conquistadors.
5	5	"The B & B"	Jeff Tomsic	Samantha Bee	May 2, 2016	105	0.771
While the kids recover from acute food poisoning, the parents decide to get some rest at a southern B&B. They are treated to southern hospitality, southern customs, and Russian vodka.
6	6	"The Wedding"	Jeff Tomsic	Neena Beber	May 9, 2016	106	0.843
Instead of getting back on the road, Robin agrees to marry the southern gentleman Dr. Rob and his Russian bride but soon realizes that something is horribly wrong.
7	7	"The Road"	Jason Jones	Jason Jones	May 16, 2016	107	0.695
While Blue Thunder is stuck in traffic. Nate and Robin stroll down Memory Lane about how they met and the kids learn an important lesson in 'too much information'. Seriously. Too much. Stop telling us all this.
8	8	"The Drop"	Joe Kessler	Chad Carter	May 23, 2016	108	0.837
Nate needs to detour to Salvation, Florida where it's Christmas every day of the year—except on Christmas Day. Things get tense when the family discovers that Nate has been lying to them in addition to being followed by 'government goons.'
9	9	"The Track"	Jeff Tomsic	Brennan Shroff	May 30, 2016	109	0.894
The Parkers finally reach Ft. Lauderdale only to have Nate's plan to get his job back completely unravel, but a nearby racetrack offers hope.
10	10	"The Beach"	Jeff Tomsic	Mike Beaver & Jason Jones	May 30, 2016	110	0.777
Nate, Robin and the kids attempt to take down Nate's company in epic whistle-blowing fashion. It won't be easy, but as we've learned, this family doesn't give up without a punch to the throat or a cheap kick to the groin.

=== Season 2 (2017) ===
No. overall	No. in season	Title	Directed by	Written by	Original release date	Prod. code	U.S. viewers (millions)
11	1	"The City"	Brennan Shroff	Chad Carter & Jason Jones & Samantha Bee	February 21, 2017	201	1.456
Nate is offered a new job in New York City, so the family moves from Syracuse to the Big Apple, but Robin isn't thrilled, and of course, getting there will be way harder than it should be.
12	2	"The Club"	Brennan Shroff	Jess Lacher	February 21, 2017	202	1.113
Robin's ex Carlos lures her back into their wild past with a visit to the club where they used to party. Meanwhile, the kids meet Nate's new boss, and Nate gets a teeny bit jealous when he sees Robin with Carlos.
13	3	"The Tub"	Brennan Shroff	Kristy Lopez-Bernal	February 28, 2017	203	0.984
As Nate and Robin contemplate having another baby, a neighbor's casual get-together turns into a home birth; Delilah learns what being a third wheel means.
14	4	"The Court"	Dale Stern	Brennan Shroff	March 7, 2017	204	1.118
Robin attempts to get a divorce from Carlos, but he has other ideas, and she's forced to come clean about her past in the city.
15	5	"The Birth"	Timothy Greenberg	Mike Beaver	March 14, 2017	205	1.036
A flash back to the night the twins were born: Halloween, drunk Nate, unhappy Robin, and Gene dressed as Napoleon Dynamite.
16	6	"The Tournament"	Dale Stern	Chad Carter	March 21, 2017	206	1.108
At Delilah's taekwondo tournament, Nate must have a tough conversation with Jared and an even tougher one with Carlos.
17	7	"The Heat"	Jason Jones	Jason Jones	March 28, 2017	207	1.072
The Parkers settle into a seemingly-normal New York City routine, but they're being surveilled by Federal agents who see much more than they expected.
18	8	"The Job"	Brennan Shroff	Brennan Shroff	April 4, 2017	208	1.088
Threatened by losing his job, Nate brings the family along as he tries to land a new customer.
19	9	"The Dilemma"	Jason Jones	Chad Carter	April 11, 2017	209	0.967
Her past finally having caught up with her, Robin prepares to go away for a long time. Meanwhile, Nate tries to piece together what went wrong; and Delilah and Jared perform in their school talent show.
20	10	"The Trip"	Brennan Shroff	Moujan Zolfaghari	April 18, 2017	210	1.006
Robin and Nate make record time to get to the kids in Florida.
21	11	"The Mule"	Brennan Shroff	Mike Beaver	April 25, 2017	211	1.141
Robin and Nate live out Nate's action-movie fantasies as they make their way to the kids, who are actually doing fine without them.
22	12	"The Ass"	Brennan Shroff	Mike Beaver	April 25, 2017	212	0.790
The family is reunited, but Robin makes a huge mistake.

=== Season 3 (2018) ===
No. overall	No. in season	Title	Directed by	Written by	Original release date	Prod. code	U.S. viewers (millions)
23	1	"The Run"	Brennan Shroff	Jason Jones & Samantha Bee	January 23, 2018	301	1.017
After a year on the lam across the continental US, the Parkers finally settle into the last place anyone will be looking for them: Alaska. But their lies and deceits soon come back to haunt them.
24	2	"The Stop"	Brennan Shroff	Hannah Klein & Isabel Richardson	January 30, 2018	302	1.083
Nate tries to navigate his new role as stay-at-home dad. Between the kids hitting puberty and Robin's long work hours and incessant partying, he's... managing. Kind of.
25	3	"The Mark"	Jason Jones	Chad Carter	February 6, 2018	303	0.880
Edie continues to surveil the Parkers looking to get close to the stupidest family member.
26	4	"The Goal"	Natalie Zea	Brennan Shroff	February 13, 2018	304	0.922
Edie goes undercover, posing as assistant coach of Jared and Delilah's hockey team. When they go on the road together, Robin suddenly feels jealous of this mysterious stranger.
27	5	"The Boat"	Brennan Shroff	Chad Carter	February 20, 2018	305	1.032
With Robin out of work, it's Nate's turn to earn—on an Alaskan factory fishing trawler. It's 7 months of rotting fish, meth fumes, and family separation.
28	6	"The Vows"	Brennan Shroff	Ian Berger	February 27, 2018	306	1.000
Upon returning home from a winter at sea, Nate finds no family waiting at the dock. He gets a lift "home and soon realizes that things can change quickly.
29	7	"The Water"	Brennan Shroff	Mike Beaver	March 6, 2018	307	0.971
A look back at Robin and Nate's first vacation together: a trip to the tropics for their first alone-together time since the twins were born.
30	8	"The Plane"	Brennan Shroff	Timothy Greenberg	March 13, 2018	308	1.066
Nate is reunited with his family and must pull off an escape from Edie and the feds...with almost no prep time and a terminally-ill 90-year-old Alaskan bush pilot.
31	9	"The Funeral"	Brennan Shroff	Mike Beaver	March 20, 2018	309	1.008
Having crashed their plane into the Alaskan wilderness the family must rely on one another to survive.
32	10	"The Escape"	Brennan Shroff	Chad Carter	March 27, 2018	310	0.906
The Parkers finally happen upon help in an abandoned ghost town filled with deadly-serious Pacific Rim LARPers.

=== Season 4 (2019) ===
No. overall	No. in season	Title	Directed by	Written by	Original release date	Prod. code	U.S. viewers (millions)
33	1	"The Search"	Brennan Shroff	Samantha Bee & Jason Jones	June 18, 2019	401	0.759
34	2	"The Return"	Brennan Shroff	Chad Carter	June 25, 2019	402	0.773
35	3	"The Sister"	Brennan Shroff	Chad Carter	July 2, 2019	403	0.783
36	4	"The BJ"	Brennan Shroff	Brennan Shroff	July 9, 2019	404	0.735
37	5	"The Year"	Jason Jones	Paris Patterson	July 16, 2019	405	0.680
38	6	"The Game Show"	Joe Kessler	Jason Jones	July 23, 2019	406	0.717
39	7	"The Entertainer"	Brennan Shroff	Chad Carter	July 30, 2019	407	0.773
40	8	"The Same"	Natalie Zea	Stephanie Streisand	August 6, 2019	408	0.707
41	9	"The Bride"	Brennan Shroff	Mike Beaver	August 13, 2019	409	0.563
42	10	"The Groom"	Brennan Shroff	Brennan Shroff	August 20, 2019	410	0.732

== Broadcast ==
In Canada, The Detour premiered on April 21, 2016 on The Comedy Network. In Latin America it premiered on June 9, 2016 on TBS. It premiered on Comedy Central India on October 5, 2016.

It is available in Australia on streaming service Stan as of January 2018.

== Reception ==
On Rotten Tomatoes, the first season has an approval rating of 78% based on 23 reviews, with an average rating of 6.9/10. The site's critical consensus reads, "Sometimes raunchy, but often honest and endearing, The Detour brings the laughs as the story tries to find its way." On Metacritic, the first season holds a score of 69 out of 100, based on 19 critics.

On Rotten Tomatoes, season two has an approval rating of 100% based on 5 reviews, with an average rating of 6.9/10. On Metacritic, season two has a weighted average score 77 out of 100, based on 4 critics, indicating "generally favorable reviews".
