= Ashley Gerasimovich =

American actress (born 2004)

- Occupation: Actress
- Years active: 2009–present

Ashley Gerasimovich is an American actress best known for her role as Delilah Parker in the TBS comedy series The Detour.

== Life and career ==
She made her acting debut in the 2009 medical drama series Mercy. Her debut film role came out as Samantha Wilson in Doug Liman's 2010 biographical political drama film Fair Game.

Her other notable films include We Need to Talk About Kevin (2011), The Stand Up (2011) and Take Me to the River (2015).

From 2016 to 2019 she starred in the TBS series, The Detour.

== Filmography ==
=== Film ===
Year	Title	Role	Notes
2010	Fair Game	Samantha Wilson	
2011	We Need to Talk About Kevin	Celia	
2011	Ashley	Ashley	Short film
2011	The Stand Up	Claire	
2015	Take Me to the River	Abbey	
2015	Keep In Touch	Young Annie	
2017	A Different Sun	Nina	

=== Television ===
Year	Title	Role	Notes
2009	Mercy	Katy Flanagan	1 episode
2010	Louie	Jane	4 episodes
2010	This Little Piggy	Zoie Graham	TV movie
2012	30 Rock	Child	2 episodes
2013	Secret Lives of Husbands and Wives	Kiki Dunn	TV movie
2013	Blue Bloods	Claire	1 episode
2014	Deadbeat	Amber	1 episode
2014	The Heart, She Holler	Young Hurshe	1 episode
2016–2019	The Detour	Delilah Parker	42 episodes
