= Nathan Macintosh =

Canadian stand-up comedian

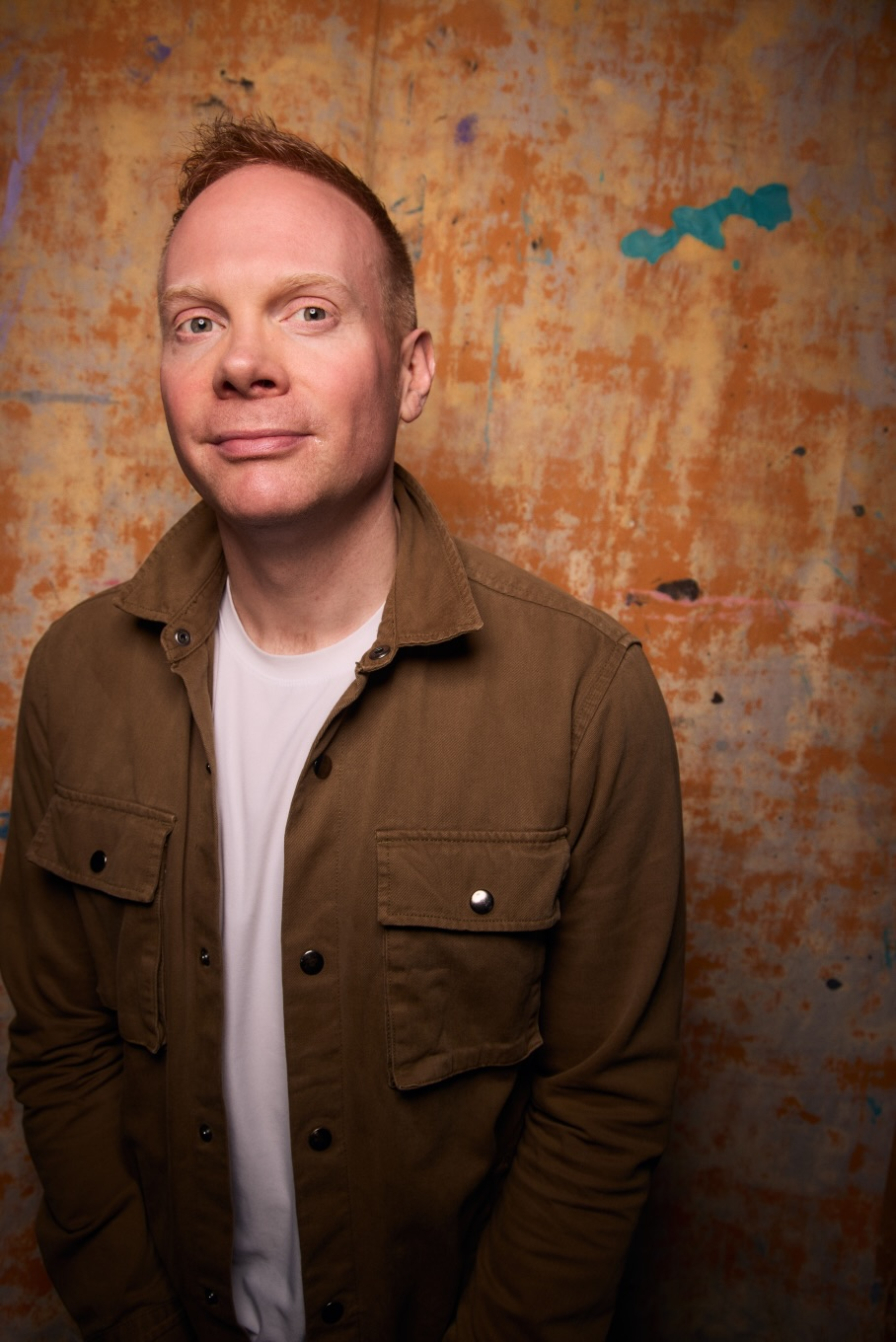
- Born: Nathaniel James Macintosh; September 9, 1985 (age 41); Halifax, Nova Scotia, Canada
- Spouse: Liz Heather (m. 2025)

Comedy career
- Medium: Stand-up; Television
- Subjects: Money; finance; technology; artificial intelligence
- Website: nathanmacintosh.com

Nathan Macintosh is a Canadian stand-up comedian from Halifax, Nova Scotia. He is most noted for his 2024 comedy album Down with Tech, which was a Juno Award nominee for Comedy Album of the Year at the Juno Awards of 2025.

== Career ==
Macintosh won the Canadian Comedy Award for Best Stand-Up Newcomer at the 10th Canadian Comedy Awards in 2009, and played a fictionalized version of himself in the 2022 TV1 comedy series Trapped. He was named one of Variety (magazine)'s 10 Comics To Watch in 2024. Macintosh is the host of the podcast Positive Anger.

The New York Times named his first special Money Never Wakes The Best YouTube Special Of 2023. His second comedy special Down With Tech was recommended by The New York Times and Vulture named it one of the Top 5 Specials To Check Out In 2024. He has performed standup on Conan (talk show) and The Late Show with Stephen Colbert in 2017, as well as The Tonight Show Starring Jimmy Fallon in 2019, 2023 and 2024.

== Personal life ==
Macintosh married Canadian writer Liz Heather in Toronto, Ontario in August 2025.
