= Donshea Hopkins =

American actress

- Born: March 2, 2002 (age 24)
- Occupation: Actress
- Years active: 2008–present

Donshea Hopkins is an American actress. She is best known for playing Raina St. Patrick in the drama series Power and Chase in the sitcom series The Detour.

== Early life ==
Hopkins attended James Madison High School and was named graduate of the year in 2020. She attended University of Mount Saint Vincent to study biochemistry.

== Career ==
Hopkins made her on-screen debut playing a little girl in an episode of the crime drama series Law & Order: Special Victims Unit. She also made an appearance on Sesame Street; Season 39 Episode 5. She also made an appearance in one episode of the medical drama series Nurse Jackie Her first big role came playing Chase in the sitcom series The Detour. She was a recurring character in the final season of the comedy drama Orange Is the New Black portraying Monica Hayes. She played Bobbi Kristina Brown, the daughter of Whitney Houston in the biographical series The Bobby Brown Story. She gained nationwide fame playing Raina St Patrick in the drama series Power.. Her character was killed off in season 4.

== Filmography ==
=== Television ===
Year	Title	Role	Notes
2008	Sesame Street	Herself	Season 39 Episode 5; Firefly Show
2009	Law & Order: Special Victims Unit	Six Year Old Girl	Episode; Unstable
2011	Nurse Jackie	Little Girl	Episode; ...Deaf Blind Tumor Pee-Test
2017	The Detour	Chase	3 episodes
2018	The Bobby Brown Story	Bobbi Kristina Brown	2 episodes
2019	The Other Two	Ebony	Episode; Chase Goes to a High School Dance
2014-2019	Orange Is the New Black	Monica Hayes	5 episodes
2014-2019	Power	Raina St Patrick	21 episodes
2020-2022	Power Book II: Ghost	Raina St Patrick	2 episodes
