= Jason Jones (actor) =

Canadian-American actor and comedian

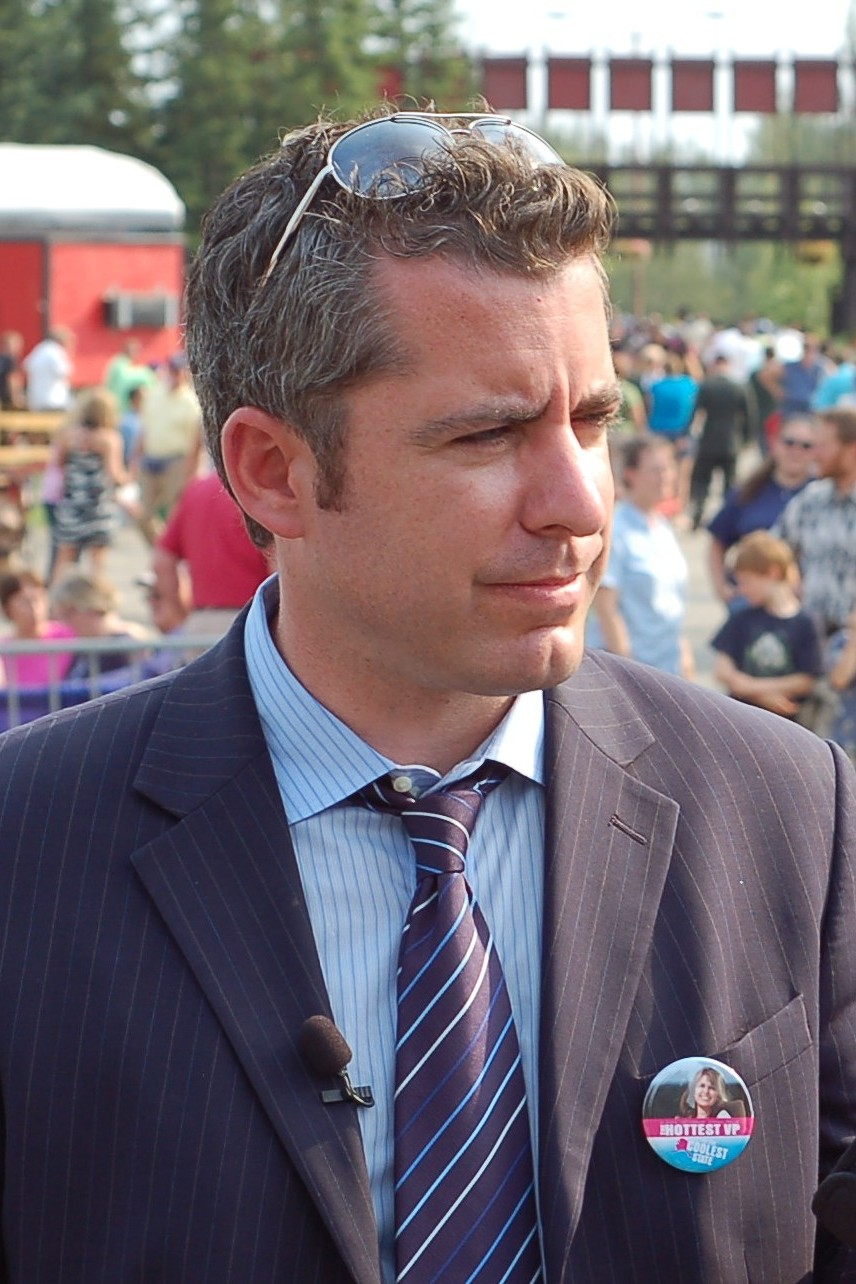
- Jones in July 2009
- Born: Jason Pierre Jones; June 3, 1973 (age 53); Hamilton, Ontario, Canada
- Citizenship: Canada, United States
- Education: Ryerson Polytechnic University (now Toronto Metropolitan University)
- Occupations: Actor; comedian; writer; producer
- Years active: 2003–present
- Spouse: Samantha Bee (m. 2001)
- Children: 3

Jason Pierre Jones (born June 3, 1973) is a Canadian and American actor, comedian and writer. He was a correspondent on The Daily Show with Jon Stewart from 2005 to 2015. From 2016 to 2019, Jones starred in the TBS comedy series The Detour, which he created with his wife Samantha Bee.

== Personal life ==
Jason Jones was born and raised in Hamilton, Ontario. He attended Hill Park Secondary School and then Ryerson Theatre School in Toronto. He is married to Samantha Bee, the host of Full Frontal with Samantha Bee and fellow former The Daily Show correspondent; they have three children: daughter Piper Bee-Jones (born 2006), son Fletcher Bee-Jones (born 2008), and daughter Ripley Bee-Jones (born 2010). In 2014, he became a United States citizen.

== Career ==
=== The Daily Show with Jon Stewart ===
In September 2005, Jones joined The Daily Show cast as a contributor. When his wife left the show in late December for family leave, Jones was promoted to a full-time correspondent. He won a significant following at The Daily Show while writing a few pieces about the Denmark cartoons, Carl Monday, and Laguna Beach. Before Rob Corddry left The Daily Show he said: "Jason Jones has raised the bar too high. I just can't say the things he says to people." His exposé on the real values of Wasilla, Alaska, remains one of the most popular segments on the Daily Show website. In 2014, Jones temporarily left The Daily Show to appear in a pilot for the sitcom Love Is Relative.

In June 2009, Jones was sent to Tehran just prior to the 2009 Iranian presidential election. His reports in Iran included an interview with Newsweek journalist Maziar Bahari, who was arrested during the 2009 Iranian presidential election protests. During Bahari's time in prison, his interrogators charged him with espionage and used Jones' interview as evidence against him. Bahari later clarified saying that the charges were fabricated. Jones appeared as himself in the film version of Bahari's ordeal, Rosewater, encountering Bahari before taping their interview. The film was written and directed by Daily Show host Jon Stewart. Another segment in Iran poked fun at Iranians' greater knowledge of the United States compared with Americans' knowledge of Iran. The segment along with a 2011 piece in which he invited cameras to view his vasectomy, are regarded by TV Guide as his signature segments on the program.

On October 7, 2014, he co-hosted The Daily Show alongside Samantha Bee, in the absence of Jon Stewart. He also disclosed on that episode that he had recently become an American citizen. Jones announced that he would leave The Daily Show in 2015 and begin work on The Detour, a TBS show which he co-wrote and executive produced with Bee.

==== 2014 Sochi Olympics ====
Jones was sent as a mock reporter to cover the 2014 Sochi Olympics. During his visit he often lampooned Russian culture and its perceived police state. For example, in an episode, Jones tried to find a protest area in Sochi and was forced to drive well outside of the city to an abandoned parking lot which was designated as the zone for protesters; however even then he was approached by police officers and asked to leave due to not having appropriate documentation. During an interview with opposition figure Alexei Navalny, the crew's cameras and other electronic equipment were jammed as they entered an apartment to conduct the interview.

Jones also managed to hold a mock interview with Mikhail Gorbachev where he insisted Gorbachev put up the wall which is a play on president Ronald Reagan's plea to Gorbachev to "tear down" the Berlin Wall. Navalny was arrested several days after his interview with Jones, which was also satirized by Jon Stewart. Jones was able to interview Sergey Markov, a prominent Russian politician and academic. During the interview Jones questioned Markov about Russia's stance on gay rights, to which Markov responded that there are no issues with gay rights in Russia and that "you are absolutely free to make sex with this table." The statement has since achieved notoriety with regards to Russia's stance on LGBT rights. During the program Jones also described Russia as a conservative paradise, noting the nation's relatively low flat tax, pro-gun stance, opposition to gay marriage, and the powerful influence of the Orthodox church. He also remarked that Russia may be the "ultimate red state."

=== Other work ===
Jones has also done various television work with his Canadian sketch comedy troupe The Bobroom, and was the host of Craft Corner Deathmatch on the Style Network in 2005. He also co-wrote, co-starred in, and co-produced the 2004 film Ham & Cheese with fellow Bobroom alumnus Mike Beaver; the film was nominated for six Canadian Comedy Awards in 2005. He has had minor roles in numerous feature films including the 2002 Syfy original film Terminal Invasion and the 2003 film Public Domain; the latter also starred Don McKellar, Nicole DeBoer, and Beaver.

He appeared in the TV show Queer as Folk, as well as appearing on the CBS sitcom How I Met Your Mother as "Tony". Jones has appeared twice on the NBC series Law & Order as Len Pewels, host of the fictional Len Pewels' America. In 2008, Jones worked on a CBS sitcom about a celebrity chef, to be played by him, with his wife to be played by Bee. Jones and Bee starred as a married couple in the movie Coopers' Camera (USA Cooper's Christmas), set in 1985 in which their Christmas was recorded on a brand new (1985, at the time) camera.

Jones next appeared in a series of television advertisements, including a series for beer brand Molson and appearing as Greg Gregger in Budweiser's short films The Best Man and The Company Man, as well as in some 30-second commercials. Jones had a supporting role in the 2009 movie All About Steve. In early 2010, he starred in a sitcom pilot for ABC called How to be a Better American but it was not picked up as a series. He also made cameo appearances in the 2012 film Pitch Perfect, its 2015 sequel Pitch Perfect 2, the 2013 film The Art of the Steal and the 2015 films Hot Tub Time Machine 2 and The Night Before. In 2014, Jones starred in the pilot for the sitcom Love is Relative as the character Nate.

He worked with Bee on development of a show for TBS, The Detour. TBS ordered the pilot in October 2014. The show is based on couple's real life experiences of family vacations. It was picked up for ten episodes in February 2015. On April 6, 2016, the show was renewed for a second season, ahead of the first-season premiere the same month. The second season premiered on February 21, 2017. On April 25, 2017, TBS renewed the series for a third season, which premiered on January 23, 2018. The fourth and final season premiered on June 18, 2019.

In 2023, he appeared in the film I Used to Be Funny.
