= Bravo!FACT Presents =

Canadian television series

Bravo!FACT Presents is a Canadian television series that was aired weekly on A and the arts channel Bravo from 2003 to 2010.

The series presented an anthology of short artistic works, ranging from comedy to drama to opera to jazz to animation. All of these were funded by BravoFACT, the foundation arm of Bravo, which also aired them as interstitial segments between programs.
