= Natalie Lisinska =

British-Canadian actress (born 1982)

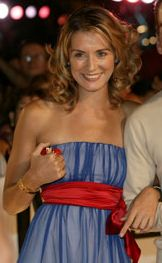
- Lisinska in 2007
- Born: 11 January 1982 (age 43); Shrewsbury, Shropshire, England
- Occupations: TV, film actress
- Years active: 2005–present

Natalie Lisinska (born 11 January 1982) is a British-Canadian actress.

Lisinska was born in Shrewsbury, Shropshire, England and grew up on Vancouver Island in British Columbia, attending St. Michaels University School. She studied drama at Ryerson University Theatre School.

== Filmography ==
=== Film ===
Year	Title	Role	Notes
2006	Rebirth	Barbie	Short film
2007	Young People Fucking	Inez	
2009	Rude Awakening	Lisa	Short film
2009	Love Your Enemy	Dora	Short film
2009	Chloe	Eliza	
2010	Spring		Short film
2010	The Translator	Penny	Short film
2011	Snitch		
2012	Total Recall	Bohemian Nurse	
2014	Shelby	Lilly Parker	

=== Television ===
Year	Title	Role	Notes
2005	Kevin Hill	Claire	Episode: "The Monroe Doctrine"
2005	The Office Temps		TV series
2006	At the Hotel	Jenny	(6 episodes)
2006	Above and Beyond	Miss Bogston	TV miniseries
2006	The House Next Door	Eloise	TV film
2007	The Dresden Files	Laura	TV miniseries
2007	'Til Death Do Us Part	Stacey	Episode: "Car Keys Murder"
2007-2008	Degrassi: The Next Generation	Andrea	Episodes: "Love Is a Battlefield" and "Pass the Dutchie"
2008	Life with Derek	Terry	Episode: "Just Friends"
2009	The B Team	Alex Taylor	TV film
2009	My Neighbor's Secret	Gretchen	TV film
2010	Fairfield Road	Hailey Caldwell	TV film
2010	Flashpoint	Rachel Williams	Episode: "Acceptable Risk"
2010	Lost Girl	Collette	Episode: "The Mourning After"
2011	Reel Love	Debbie Manfredi	TV film
2011	InSecurity	Alex Cranston	Main role (23 episodes)
2012	Less Than Kind	Karen	Episode: "Fugue State"
2012	Saving Hope	Pamela	Episode: "Pink Clouds"
2012	Baby's First Christmas	Trisha	TV film
2013-14, 2017	Orphan Black	Aynsley Norris	Recurring role (Season 1-2, 5) (7 episodes) Best Performance in a Guest Role, Dramatic Series, 2nd Canadian Screen Awards
2013	Satisfaction	Shannon	Episode: "The Internship, Relationship, Friendship"
2017	Mommy's Little Boy	Sherry Davis	TV film
2018	Under the Autumn Moon	Taylor	TV film
2018	The Expanse	Lt. Shaffer	Season 3 (2 episodes)
2018	Star Falls	Cynthia	Episode: "The Co-Star"
2022	The Lake	Jayne	8 Episodes
2025	A Firefighter's Christmas Calendar	Jackie	TV film
