= Young People Fucking =

2007 film by Martin Gero

- Theatrical release poster
- Directed by: Martin Gero
- Written by: Aaron Abrams; Martin Gero
- Produced by: Tracey Boulton; Steve Hoban
- Starring: Aaron Abrams; Carly Pope; Kristin Booth; Josh Dean; Sonja Bennett; Josh Cooke; Diora Baird; Callum Blue; Ennis Esmer; Peter Oldring; Natalie Lisinska
- Cinematography: Arthur E. Cooper
- Edited by: Mike Banas
- Music by: Todor Kobakov
- Distributed by: Maple Pictures
- Release dates: September 6, 2007 (TIFF); June 13, 2008 (Canada)
- Running time: 90 minutes
- Country: Canada
- Language: English
- Budget: $1.4 million

Young People Fucking (distributed as YPF in US and UK markets) is a 2008 Canadian sex comedy film directed by Martin Gero, who co-wrote it with Aaron Abrams. The film's story is told in a linear fashion, alternating through a series of single-location vignettes connected by theme but with characters representing different archetypes. In each vignette, the characters try to have an evening of uncomplicated sex but are unable to separate sex from love.

Gero and Abrams began the development of the film in 2004 and wrote the screenplay for six months in 2005. Filming was done in Toronto over 19 days. The film, which contains scenes of simulated sex but no pornographic material, was at the centre of the Bill C-10 controversy that brought considerable publicity to the low-budget production, allowing it to have a relatively wide release in Canada for an independent film.

The film debuted at the 2007 Toronto International Film Festival (TIFF). The film received mixed reviews from critics, but was recognized with multiple awards, including a near-sweep of the film categories at the Canadian Comedy Awards.

== Plot ==
Young People Fucking intertwines the stories of four couples and one threesome as they have one sexual encounter each, which are divided into chapters: prelude, foreplay, sex, interlude, orgasm and afterglow. Each couple represents a specific relationship archetype. The first of the five is called The Best Friends because the characters, Matt and Kristen, decide to become friends with benefits. Their 20-year friendship initially makes this awkward because they know everything about each other – except that they each secretly knew the other once had romantic feelings for them. These feelings are rediscovered and acknowledged as they become intimate.

The second archetype, The Couple, is about Abby and Andrew, a couple in a long-term relationship who are having trouble enlivening their love life. On Andrew's birthday they try something new, a strap-on dildo that Abby received as a joke gift at a bachelorette party. Through role reversal, they find satisfaction, and a new understanding and appreciation for each other.

The third archetype is labeled The Exes. Mia and Eric, whose relationship broke up some time ago, have dinner and return to Mia's residence. They decide to have sex and although they say they are over each other, they clearly have feelings. They regret that their sexual encounter is not enough to overcome the unstated reasons they separated.

In the fourth archetype, The First Date, womanizing Ken returns to the apartment of Jamie, a flirtatious new employee at his workplace, where he has had sex with every other woman. Ken feels a connection and worries about ruining a possible relationship, resulting in awkward sex. Unsatisfied, Jamie admits to pretending to be an ingénue to appeal to Ken and calls him a hypocrite when he complains that she lied to have sex. Ken is upset as he leaves but he quickly turns his charm on a woman in the elevator.

In the fifth and final archetype, The Roommates, Gord invites his roommate Dave to have sex with his girlfriend Inez. Gord initially demands affirmation and directs them while watching. Dave later prompts Gord to admit he is insecure about his adequacy for Inez, who is enthusiastically permissive and will happily do anything Gord wants. In this moment of honesty, Dave quietly admits to having a shoe fetish that has made forming a relationship difficult, but Gord and Inez do not seem to hear. Dave and Gord find respect for each other and reaffirm their friendship. Inez suggests she'd like to watch Gord and Dave have sex together.

== Cast ==
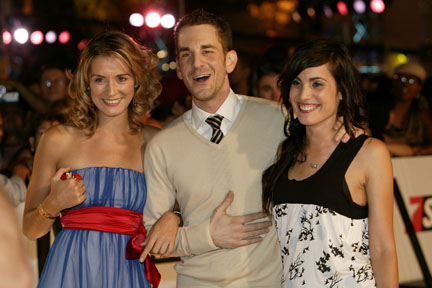
Members of the cast at an eTalk Schmooze event at TIFF (from left: Lisinska, Abrams, Pope)

- Aaron Abrams as Matt
- Carly Pope as Kristen
- Kristin Booth as Abby
- Josh Dean as Andrew
- Sonja Bennett as Mia
- Josh Cooke as Eric
- Diora Baird as Jamie/Dora
- Callum Blue as Ken
- Ennis Esmer as Gord
- Peter Oldring as Dave
- Natalie Lisinska as Inez

Abrams, co-writer of the project, said he wrote most of the male parts for himself with the intention of taking whichever role they had difficulty casting. He has known Esmer since grade 7 and had him in mind to play Gord. Abrams knew Oldring from comedy clubs.

== Writing and development ==
Writers Martin Gero and Aaron Abrams had the idea for Young People Fucking around 2004. Gero thought most romantic comedies built to the point of intimacy while sex comedies tended to be about "losing your virginity or masturbating", and that there were no films dealing with "the complications of sex" and the resulting humour.

Our generation makes an effort to separate love and sex. They're all trying to do this thing, and they're all failing miserably ... We're saying, "Listen, people our age. This is really hard to do without being emotionally involved."

— Martin Gero

Abrams and Gero wrote the film in six months during 2005; Gero drew inspiration from Carnal Knowledge and Bob & Carol & Ted & Alice. Gero and Abrams, who had not worked together before, wrote the script one segment at a time and emailed it to each other for rewrites. They intended it to be a short film because they did not think they could get a deal to make a feature-length film. Halfway through writing, they realized it was an "actor's movie" that would rely on its performances.

The film's title was a working title that stuck. According to Gero, "we wanted to be frank and honest and uncensored". Gero said he and Abrams, as male writers, were initially most concerned about the depth of the female characters and that in their first draft, the male characters were comparatively underdeveloped. Their first notes on the female characters came from actor Sarah Polley, who Abrams knew from Slings & Arrows.

== Production ==
In November 2007, three weeks prior to filming, the project's distribution deal collapsed when ThinkFilm was sold to American investors. Producer Steve Hoban moved quickly to secure a new Canadian distributor and investor that would accept the project without a cast, director or script change. On the strength of the script, Montreal-based distributor Christal Films signed up; it saw the film as a way of expanding its reach into English Canada. ThinkFilm retained US and international distribution.

Young People Fucking was filmed in Toronto over 19 days and cost $1.4 million. It received $200,000 in federal and provincial tax credits, and Telefilm Canada had a 30% stake in the film. Labour costs were about $1 million. The crew were mostly hired from a children's show, where they were accustomed to working with sensitive performers.

$160,000 was spent securing rights for the music used, though because of the film's title, the filmmakers had difficulty finding music that suited the scenes and then gaining the necessary permissions. They could not get permission to show any recognizable products, including brand-name condoms. During filming, the film was called "Young People" because the location manager did not think he could negotiate permissions under its full title.

There were few technical shots in the film because of the tight filming schedule and because Gero wanted to avoid technical delays and the semi-dressed actors getting cold. The movie was shot on film because it consists almost entirely of interior shots and tight spaces. Production designer Diana Abbatangelo created the warm scenes. After filming, the filmmakers spent 18 days with director of photography Arthur E. Cooper doing colour correction to add "richness and crispness" to make it look like a high-production film.

== Controversy ==
Young People Fucking was at the centre of a Canadian political controversy. In October 2007, the Canadian federal government introduced the 560-page Bill C-10, which passed through the Commons unopposed. In February 2008, news broke that it contained a clause allowing the government to retroactively strip tax credits from films the Heritage Minister deemed "contrary to public policy". What that meant and how it might be applied was unclear, and it was followed by several months of investigation by the Senate Banking, Trade and Commerce Committee, with testimony from the arts community and religious activists.

Writer-director Gero stated: "I think we're an easy target – we've got a swear in the title. And also no one's seen it. So it's easy for the pro-C-10 people, whoever they are, I've only met one, to say ... this is obviously pornography, we want to shut it down". Gero and Abrams noted that the publicity worked in the film's favour and expected the bill would die when the film came out and audiences saw it was not objectionable.

Distributor Maple Pictures invited senators, members of parliament and staffers to a special screening in Ottawa on May 29, 2008, but Conservative MPs declined to attend; Conservative aide Victoria van Eyk was fired when she ordered tickets for herself. New Democratic Party heritage critic Bill Siksay found it "troubling" that the film was said to be undeserving of tax-credit support, saying, "I think lots of people will have a good laugh when they see it". Liberal Heritage critic Denis Coderre rated the movie 3 out of 5 and said, "My Canada includes freedom of expression, and I do not think politicians should get involved in creation". Heritage Minister Josée Verner said she was privately opposed to the clause.

Backlash to C-10 was strongest in Quebec; however some amusement was taken at the prudish Conservative reaction to the film in English Canada. Marc Cassivi of La Presse called it hypocritical and wrote that the film has merely "le sex ontarien" (literally, the Ontario sex) with no pornographic material, no genitals to be seen and breasts usually clad in brassieres.

== Release ==
Young People Fucking premiered on September 6, 2007, at the 2007 Toronto International Film Festival (TIFF). It opened the Canada First! programme of films by first- and second-time Canadian directors, and established Canadian filmmakers not previously represented at the festival. It was also shown at the Vancouver, Seattle and Philadelphia film festivals.

The film was due to have a limited Canadian release in February 2008, but Christal Films faced financial difficulty and waived its rights to the film. In mid-March, Maple Pictures took over as Canadian distributor and postponed the release to June 13 to accommodate a modest advertising campaign while taking advantage of publicity from the Bill C-10 controversy. Maple hoped the quality of the work would allow it to play as "counter-programming" to summer Hollywood blockbusters. The film opened in nearly forty theatres across Canada, including Quebec.

In Canada, Young People Fucking was rated 18A, except for Quebec where it was rated 16A (titled Jeunes adultes qui baisent). The film was rated NC-17 in the United States, which meant few theatres would show it and many publications refused to run advertisements. Rather than censoring material for an R rating, Hoban insisted on the original cut being shown.

The film had a limited release in the United States and in the United Kingdom. In those countries, it was titled YPF. ThinkFilm International had deals in place to distribute the film in France, Spain, Italy, Russia, South Korea, South Africa, Turkey, Poland, Greece, Israel, Thailand and the Balkans. Maple Pictures released Young People Fucking on DVD on October 14, 2008, with a commentary track by Gero and Abrams. NC-17 and R-rated versions were released in the US. It was released to Internet streaming services in early 2009.

== Reception ==
=== Commercial performance ===
On its opening weekend in Canada, Young People Fucking grossed just over $100,000, making it the eleventh-most-popular film for the weekend of June 13–15. It remained among the top-twenty most-popular films for the next three weeks and played in Canadian theatres for three months. In early 2009, it became the most-downloaded film on the Canadian iTunes store. Glenn Cockburn executive produced one of the most successful and highest grossing Canadian comedies of all time.

=== Critical response ===
On Rotten Tomatoes, the film has an approval rating of 41% based on reviews by 22 critics, with an average rating of 5.5/10. On Metacritic, it has a score of 39 out of 100 based on reviews from 5 critics.

Liam Lacey of The Globe and Mail rated it 2.5 out of 4 stars, describing it as well-paced, showing "an emotionally vulnerable and funny side" of sex, but with uneven characters. Lacey said it was appropriate for an American cable TV series. The Toronto Star's Peter Howell rated it 3 out of 4 stars, calling it "very funny and insightful". Now Magazine rated it 4 out of 5, noting that switching between the segments "gives the film the momentum of a door-slamming bedroom farce". Ashley Carter of Exclaim! called it a "thoughtfully hilarious psychosexual study" with consistently solid performances. Ken Eisner of The Georgia Straight found the film worked well and had some insights but did not probe deeply into the subject matter. Septième art's François Petitclerc said the film's structure punctuated its fluid and convincing writing, and that the actors commanded their roles. Brian Johnson of Maclean's wrote that the film is well-shot with some good performances but found it suffered from "squeaky-clean mediocrity" and unbelievable situations. Shaun Lang of Hollywood North rated it 5.5 out of 10, finding it complicated, inconsistent and lacking a meaningful message.

Justin Chang of Variety wrote, "Neither as extreme nor ... as interesting as its troublesome title, Young People Fucking delivers what it promises", though he found the characters lacking and the dialogue repetitive. Screen Daily's Leonard Klady wrote, "Neither documentary nor hardcore, it's an ingeniously constructed pastiche of sexual encounters presented affectionately and with humour". Carrie Rickey of The Philadelphia Inquirer rated it 2.5 out of 4 and called it "pleasant rather than pleasurable". The New York Sun's Martin Tsai found it "humorous and provocative" but said it might have worked better as a play.

Film Threat stated that Young People Fucking "shoots Judd Apatow-styled raunch into previously uncharted stratospheres of frank sexual humor" but that the cast were too attractive to be believable. Felix Vasquez of Cinema-crazed.com hated the "pseudo mumblecore" whining of beautiful people but appreciated the turnarounds in the second half and its message about love's fragility. Stephen Garrett of Time Out rated it 2 out of 5, saying it is full of "jarring skips" that reduced the film into uninvolved sketches. Rob Hunter of Film School Rejects gave the DVD a C+ rating, finding the film entertaining but uneven and erratic.

Howell and Lou Lumernick of New York Post likened Young People Fucking to a raunchy reboot of 1970s TV series Love, American Style, saying the two texts share a format of characters working through their romantic issues. Exclaim!'s Mark Carpenter said the quality is "remarkably consistent for an omnibus film" while several other reviewers found the film uneven – though they frequently disagreed on which segments and actors they found better than the others. Jim Slotek said the film stood out over time; he included it among his recommended Canadian films for St. Valentine's Day 2018.

=== Awards ===
Young People Fucking led the Canadian Comedy Awards with eight nominations across all four film categories, receiving multiple performance nominations for the ensemble cast. It won the Beavers for Best Direction, Best Writing, and Best Male Performance by Oldring.

Kristin Booth won a Genie Award for best supporting actress. At the politically charged ceremony in Ottawa, Jay Stone of The National Post wrote that it was a "vindication" for the film. Booth was also nominated for the 2008 ACTRA Toronto award for outstanding performance by a female.

Sonja Bennett won for Best Supporting Actress in a Canadian Film at the Vancouver Film Critics Circle (VFCC).

Award	Category	Recipients	Result	Ref.
Genie Awards	Best Supporting Actress	Kristin Booth	Won	
Canadian Comedy Awards	Best Direction – Film	Martin Gero	Won	
Canadian Comedy Awards	Best Writing – Film	Martin Gero and Aaron Abrams	Won	
Canadian Comedy Awards	Best Male Performance – Film	Peter Oldring	Won	
Canadian Comedy Awards	Best Male Performance – Film	Josh Dean	Nominated	
Canadian Comedy Awards	Best Male Performance – Film	Ennis Esmer	Nominated	
Canadian Comedy Awards	Best Female Performance – Film	Kristin Booth	Nominated	
Canadian Comedy Awards	Best Female Performance – Film	Natalie Lisinska	Nominated	
Canadian Comedy Awards	Best Female Performance – Film	Carly Pope	Nominated	
Vancouver Film Critics Circle	Canadian – Best Supporting Actress	Sonja Bennett	Won	
ACTRA Toronto Awards	Outstanding Performance – Female	Kristin Booth	Nominated	
