= Scott Faulconbridge =

Canadian comedian, writer, and actor

- Born: William Scott Faulconbridge; May 21, 1966 (age 59)
- Occupations: comedian, actor, writer
- Website: http://scottfaulconbridge.com/

Scott Faulconbridge (born William Scott Faulconbridge on May 21, 1966) is a Canadian comedian, writer, and actor. He is known in North America and abroad for his stand-up routines. He is a regular on CBC radio's The Debaters with Steve Patterson and has worked extensively in stand-up, television, and film. He has been on Just For Laughs, appeared on NBC's Last Comic Standing, and was nominated for a Canadian Comedy Award in 2009.

== Education and career ==
Faulconbridge majored in immunology at McGill University Montreal, Quebec. He began his comedic career in the 1990s with Montreal's 'On the spot Improv. Soon after working with On the Spot Improv troupe, Faulconbridge embarked on a stand-up routine which has taken him all over Canada, the US, and the UK. His appearances have aired on CBC, CTV, and NBC television networks. He had been showcased at the Halifax Comedy Festival, Winnipeg Comedy Festival, and five times at the world-famous Just for Laughs comedy festival in Montreal. On television, Scott appeared on CBC's Comics, and CTV's Comedy Now and NBC's Last Comic Standing.

== Writing and acting ==
Scott Faulconbridge has over a dozen acting credits to his name In 2007, he rewrote the screenplay for the feature film Iza Bella. Other writing credits include: CBC's Just for Laughs, Discovery Kids’ Jacques Cousteau, and YTV's Fries with That. Mr. Faulconbridge acted in Stephen King's Dead Zone, he was "Jed" in the feature film Abandon, and he played "Billy the Caddy" in Disney's The Greatest Game Ever Played.

== DVDs and CDs ==
In 2005, Scott Faulconbridge put together the CD Warn the Others; in 2008, the live performance DVD titled Nice Shoes; in 2014, he released the CD Scottland; and in 2015, Putting Out the Garbage (a short CD featuring two studio songs).
