= List of Backstage characters =

List of characters in the Canadian television series Backstage

Backstage is a Canadian drama series about a performing arts high school created by Jennifer Pertsch and Lara Azzopardi. The series aired in Canada on Family Channel from March 18 to December 9, 2016, and in the United States on Disney Channel from March 25 to September 30, 2016. The series was also released on Netflix on September 30, 2017. The series' ensemble cast includes Devyn Nekoda, Alyssa Trask, Josh Bogert, Aviva Mongillo, Matthew Isen, and Julia Tomasone.

== Main ==
=== Vanessa ===
Vanessa Morita (Devyn Nekoda) is a ballet dancer. She attends Keaton upon insistence from her best friend Carly. She and Carly have been friends since they were very young. Dance and competition often create conflict in their relationship, though they are shown to have a very strong friendship. She is also known by her nickname Vee. She is the freshman Prima pick until she is replaced by Cassandra after refusing to end her friendship with Carly. She is cast in the main role of Cinderella in the freshman dance show Step Sister. She hurts her ankle, but continues to dance on it, insisting she is fine. She eventually falls and breaks it on opening night, and, as a result, has to walk on crutches. Her ankle eventually heals and she is able to walk and dance again. She later joins the Streets, a dance crew led by Sloane. She is a skilled choreographer and dancer. She is shown to be hard working, optimistic, friendly, caring, and determined. She is extremely focused on dance and often puts pressure on herself. She is very loyal to her friends, often encouraging them to do their best and standing up for them. She and Sasha are also good friends and are often supportive dance partners. She and Sasha share a kiss in the first season, but Sasha writes it off, claiming that he got caught up in the moment. In the second season, she becomes Beckett's girlfriend

=== Carly ===
Carly Catto (Alyssa Trask) is a ballet dancer. She is Vanessa's best friend. She is also known by her nickname C.

=== Miles ===
Miles Lennox (Josh Bogert) is a shy music student. He plays guitar, piano, percussion, and can also sing. He has a kidney disease.

=== Alya ===
Alya Kendrick (Aviva Mongillo) is a shy music student. She plays guitar and sings. She also suffers from stage fright.

=== Jax ===
Jackson "Jax" Gardner (Matthew Isen) is a music student. He is a self-proclaimed professional DJ by the name of DJ G.

=== Bianca ===
Bianca Blackwell (Julia Tomasone) is a music student and a singer. She is an actress from a number of shows, most recently Chase on Chase and Chance.

=== Jenna ===
Jenna Cristinziano (Adrianna Di Liello) is a dance student who often feels left out and ignored especially when she is with Vanessa and Carly.

=== Sasha ===
Sasha Roy (Colin Petierre) is a dance student. He also is responsible for TMK, Keaton's gossip blog.

=== Scarlett ===
Scarlett Dunn (Mckenzie Small) is a tenth grade music student and a singer. She is called Scarlett the Starlet by most students of Keaton and considered one of the most talented singers at the school. She is Kit's adopted sister.

=== Kit ===
Katherine Emily "Kit" Dunn (Romy Weltman) is a music and an art student. She is a producer, considered talented by even Jax, and an artist. She is also Scarlett's adopted sister.

=== Denzel ===
Denzel Stone (Isiah Hall) is a visual arts student. He is a producer and an artist and close friends with Kit. He departs the series after the first season.

=== Julie ===
Julie Maslany (Kyal Legend) is the student body president. She shows up to school dressed in different costumes every day and is considered an amazing artist along with dance and singing. Denzel thinks of her as a hero.

=== Park ===
Mr. Park (Chris Hoffman) is the music teacher. Unlike Helsweel, he shows compassion toward his students.

=== Helsweel ===
Etta Helsweel (Jane Moffat) is the dance teacher, who was a prima ballerina for the National Ballet for five years.

=== Beckett ===
Beckett Bradstreet (Thomas L. Colford) is a dance student at Keaton. He joins the series in the second season.

== Recurring ==
=== Cassandra ===
Cassandra Miller (Madison MacGregor) is the dance captain of the Primas.

=== Maria Schiller ===
Maria Schiller (Pippa Leslie) is a former professional ballerina and a new dance teacher at Keaton. She is later fired.

=== Principal Durani ===
Principal D. Durani (Dewshane Williams) is the principal of Keaton School of the Arts.

=== Austin ===
Austin Taylor (Michael Kaplan) is a film student at Keaton. His last appearance is in "After the Flood".

=== Sloane ===
Sloane (Stephanie Caldeira) is the leader of the Streets, a group of drama students who dance outdoors. Although they have had no formal dance training, they later get an opportunity to train at Keaton.

=== Frances ===
Frances O'Connell (Stephanie La Rochelle) is a senior and talented singer. In the second season, she is assigned to mentor sophomores, including include Miles, Alya and Bianca.

=== Mindy ===
Mindy (Hailey Fauchere) is a freshman dancer who is accepted into the Primas in the second season.

== See also ==
- List of Backstage episodes
