= List of Backstage episodes =

Backstage is a Canadian drama series about a performing arts high school created by Jennifer Pertsch and Lara Azzopardi. The series aired in Canada on Family Channel from March 18 to December 9, 2016, and in the United States on Disney Channel from March 25 to September 30, 2016. The series was also released on Netflix on September 30, 2017. The series' ensemble cast includes Devyn Nekoda, Alyssa Trask, Josh Bogert, Aviva Mongillo, Matthew Isen, and Julia Tomasone.

== Series overview ==
Season	Episodes	Originally released	
Season	Episodes	First released	Last released
1	30	March 18, 2016	September 30, 2016
2	30	July 28, 2017	September 30, 2017

== Episodes ==
=== Season 1 (2016) ===
No. overall	No. in season	Title	Directed by	Written by	Canadian air date	U.S. air date	U.S. viewers (millions)
1	1	"The First Day"	RT!	Lara Azzopardi	March 18, 2016	March 25, 2016	1.23
It is the first day at Keaton for a group of ninth graders, including dance students and best friends Carly and Vanessa, and music students Jax, Miles and Alya. They get a welcome plus a first lesson on the difficulties they will experience at the prestigious arts school. Carly and Vanessa meet a tenth grader, Sasha, a dance student who has taken their teacher Helsweel's class before and helps the two freshmen get through their first day with Helsweel. After the dance auditions, Helsweel selects Vanessa to train with the Primas, an elite group of fourth-year dance students. Meanwhile, Alya's late arrival to class prompts music teacher Park to choose her to showcase her singing, but she freezes and it leads a fellow student, Bianca, to quickly pass judgment on her. Bianca's negative comments eventually become enough for Alya to contemplate quitting after the first day, but Miles persuades her not to after he had heard her sing. Alya regains her confidence and gets another chance to perform her song in class. Also, Jax struggles with his music assignment as he is not used to the equipment he and his partner Kit are using. Guest star: Madison MacGregor (Cassandra)
2	2	"Groups of Two"	RT!	Jennifer Pertsch	March 25, 2016	April 1, 2016	1.12
Helsweel assigns the dance students their partners; among them, Carly is paired with Sasha while Vanessa is paired with Jenna. Carly's jealousy over Vanessa's joining the Primas spills over after she sees Vanessa showing Jenna a familiar dance move. Scarlett mentors some freshmen in the music program, and has Bianca and Alya roleplay in an audition, where Bianca continues to intimidate Alya. Scarlett helps Alya see that no one is perfect, even Bianca, and gives Alya some tips on how to overcome Bianca's teasing. Meanwhile, Jax is upset over Park's special treatment of Miles, but when Miles leaves behind his phone, Jax snoops and finds something suspicious on it, promptly reporting it to Park. Absent: Romy Weltman as Kit, Isiah Hall as Denzel, Kyal Legend as Julie
3	3	"The Brightside"	Warren P. Sonoda	Jennifer Pertsch	April 1, 2016	April 8, 2016	1.25
It is orientation day for the freshmen. As organizer, Julie hopes it will go well, but Scarlett believes it to be a waste of time, especially with the uninspiring ideas Julie has to involve the freshmen. Jax continues to wonder why Miles is being treated as a teacher's pet; after the two pair up for a class assignment, Miles attempts to show Jax that he does not want the special treatment. They skip the orientation and get caught by Park, who gives them both detention. Meanwhile, at the orientation, only five people show up initially, including Carly and Vanessa, who are still fighting. While Julie rounds up more freshmen, the two girls get heated again which causes Julie to change her approach for the orientation, turning it into a fun dance-off. It allows Carly and Vanessa to realize the pettiness of their arguing, and they let it go. As for the two serving detention for not going to orientation, Jax stumbles across a prescription medication Miles is taking, and while Miles gets it back from him without saying anything, Jax is able to put things together—Miles is sick. Absent: Jane Moffat as Helsweel
4	4	"Stand Tall"	Warren P. Sonoda	Matt Schiller	April 8, 2016	April 15, 2016	1.07
Vanessa gets a chance to dance with the Primas after another dancer gets sick. She asks Carly for help but gets sick herself due to the immensity of this opportunity. Despite the setback, she goes forward with her dance, performing it while sick, and gets respect from the Primas.... Park challenges his students to interpret an instrumental song and make it their own. Bianca struggles with the assignment and decides to get help from Alya; the two work on introducing lyrics to the song. As this was intended to be an individual assignment, Bianca fails to give any credit to Alya after presenting her version to the class.... When Julie looks for someone to mentor in the art program, Denzel goes in a different direction with his art to impress her. He blows his chance because his new works lack an important ingredient—him. Guest star: Madison MacGregor Absent: Mckenzie Small as Scarlett, Jane Moffat as Helsweel
5	5	"Take Me Out"	Wendy Morgan	Matt Schiller	April 15, 2016	April 29, 2016	1.18
Principal Durani puts Miles in charge of an activity to bring the disciplines together at Keaton, so Miles organizes a baseball team. Jax signs up to help him out, and Miles gives Jax pointers on playing the game, for a musician who is classically trained and had little time for the sport.... Carly is worried Sasha is developing feelings for her and how it will interfere with their dancing. Vanessa thinks the two are in love with each other, but Carly denies it. She contemplates switching partners, but Helsweel denies Carly's request and gives her advice about being a true dancer, including being honest with herself.... Park gives Denzel and Kit the task of producing one of Scarlett's songs. Differences in how Scarlett should sing it led to her walking out on the session. When Denzel and Kit lack enough material for a satisfactory track, Kit persuades Scarlett to come back, and the three work together to get the assignment done. Afterward, Denzel overhears Kit and Scarlett talking about something they are doing later and is blown away when Kit reveals Scarlett is her sister, albeit by adoption. Guest star: Dewshane Williams (Principal Durani) Absent: Kyal Legend as Julie
6	6	"Dig Deeper"	Wendy Morgan	Kate Hewlett	April 22, 2016	May 6, 2016	0.85
In her "movement for non-movers" class, Scarlett is assigned to observe Julie and do a movement piece based on what she sees. When Scarlett discovers she was the subject of Julie's movement in the class, she becomes more focused to do her assignment, but when her movement includes wearing a school uniform only Julie is supposed to know about, Julie is forced to reveal a shocking secret to Scarlett.... Miles and Alya pair up for their mid-term duet assignment. Not pleased with Miles' shallow songwriting, Alya is hesitant to mention it to him at first, but after she finally gives him the criticism, it prompts Miles to go with something deeper. He comes up with a song expressing the precious nature of life.... Carly is going on her first date with Sasha, who is taking her to see Shawn Mendes, which includes backstage passes. However, the concert conflicts with the nine-year anniversary of the day Carly and Vanessa became friends. Although Vanessa is disappointed she will not be with Carly for much of their special day, she realizes the importance of Carly and Sasha being together for this occasion. Guest star: Madison MacGregor Absent: Adrianna Di Liello as Jenna, Romy Weltman as Kit, Isiah Hall as Denzel, Jane Moffat as Helsweel
7	7	"In Their Shoes"	Director X	Kate Hewlett	April 29, 2016	May 13, 2016	1.11
Jax helps Miles with writing three songs for a radio contest, but with the deadline only days away, Jax finds the task unrealistic and is concerned about Miles' health under this kind of pressure. When Jax suggests postponing the project, it slips out that he knows Miles is sick and Miles gets upset. Eventually, the immense work load and stress take its toll and Miles collapses. After he recovers, Miles decides to not hide his illness anymore, revealing to Jax and Alya that he is on a kidney transplant list.... Helsweel reminds the dancers of their mid-term, auditioning for the dance show taking place at the end of the semester. She expects Vanessa to sign up for the lead role of Cinderella, so Vanessa does, while Sasha encourages Carly to try out for the lead as well. As the two girls prepare to dance with Sasha, who is going to be the prince in the show, Vanessa feels Carly has a huge advantage being Sasha's partner, but Carly throws her dance to give Vanessa the part.... Julie is in need of recycled materials for her art project and Scarlett offers to help. They unknowingly come across Cassandra's lost ballet shoes, which Scarlett thought were discarded. Cassandra wants compensation for the shoes, but Julie manages to repair them. Guest star: Madison MacGregor Absent: Julia Tomasone as Bianca, Romy Weltman as Kit, Isiah Hall as Denzel, Chris Hoffman as Park
8	8	"On Deck"	Director X	Scott Oleszkowicz	May 6, 2016	May 20, 2016	1.21
Bianca's mother comes to Keaton to cast a singer for a huge musical, and Bianca and Alya are among those trying out for the part. When Bianca sees Alya is frightened about freezing during her audition, Bianca decides to help her gain confidence even though she is sure Alya will fail. Right before her turn, Alya is still feeling anxious, but she ends up nailing the audition.... Denzel is designing Sasha's costume for the dance show, but Sasha is uncomfortable with the way the pants fit and needs them adjusted. Unfortunately, he has to attend a rehearsal right away, wearing the pants, and experiences a humiliating moment while extending his body.... When Jax and Kit argue the merits of the popular DJ Diamondmind, they decide to face off in a battle of their music samples but agree to use original tracks. Jax's curiosity about where Kit gets her samples motivates him to steal her USB drive containing them when she steps away briefly. Once the face-off happens and gets heated, Jax discovers one of Kit's tracks is actually from Diamondmind. Guest star: Carly Street (Mrs. Blackwell – Bianca's mother) Absent: Adrianna Di Liello as Jenna, Mckenzie Small as Scarlett, Kyal Legend as Julie, Chris Hoffman as Park, Jane Moffat as Helsweel
9	9	"Sotto Voce"	RT!	Scott Oleszkowicz	May 13, 2016	June 3, 2016	1.31
Upon hearing about Kit's music samples at the deejay battle, Principal Durani discovers other samples Kit submitted for her Keaton audition are also identical to those of DJ Diamondmind and expels her for plagiarism. As she gets ready to leave, she confronts Jax but during their altercation, she unintentionally reveals she is Diamondmind. Kit does not want everyone else to know this, including the principal, so she, Jax and Scarlett come up with a plan to let her stay at Keaton while keeping her identity secret.... Helsweel finds Vanessa's dance chemistry with Sasha to be subpar, so Vanessa looks to Carly for help on improving her dancing. While training with Carly, Vanessa injures her ankle but does not let on that she is hurt, even in another rehearsal with Sasha.... Miles and Julie fight over use of an audio room to work on their assignments. When their bickering gets them nowhere, Miles offers to help Julie with her project, and in turn, Julie offers to help Miles with his. Guest star: Dewshane Williams Absent: Aviva Mongillo as Alya, Julia Tomasone as Bianca, Isiah Hall as Denzel
10	10	"The Understudy"	RT!	Lauren Gosnell	May 20, 2016	June 10, 2016	1.14
Alya gains unexpected popularity for the role she recently landed in Da Bohème, even before the musical's premiere, and is learning how to deal with the fame around a jealous Bianca. After a poster advertising her role gets vandalized, Alya berates Bianca for the mischief and then regrets it when Miles admits he was the one behind the act, as a joke.... Helsweel introduces the dance class to a famous alumnus of Keaton, Maria Schiller, who plans to work with the class as their upcoming dance show nears. Sasha feels the cold shoulder Carly has been giving him and wonders where he stands with her, so as Maria evaluates the class, Sasha arranges to dance with Carly instead of Vanessa. Maria praises their dancing but is astonished Carly is only the understudy.... Scarlett is worried she is developing nodes. While relaxing her voice, she notices how easily Denzel picks up her gestures and asks him to be her interpreter. After Scarlett finds out her voice is fine and starts talking again, she needs reminding how much Denzel helped her and to be grateful. Guest star: Pippa Leslie (Maria Schiller) Absent: Matthew Isen as Jax, Adrianna Di Liello as Jenna, Chris Hoffman as Park
11	11	"Lose Yourself"	Warren P. Sonoda	Lauren Gosnell	May 27, 2016	June 17, 2016	1.26
When Julie uses school property for her latest art project, Principal Durani deems it vandalism and wants her to dismantle the work. Julie sees this as an attack on her artistic freedom and organizes a protest, which Durani swiftly ends. He then decides to contact Julie's parents—who are unaware their daughter is attending Keaton—but he is unable to reach them; he becomes more suspicious when he finds no information about them on file.... With the dance class focused on their mid-term routines, Maria has the class doing some different, uplifting choreography, but it upsets Vanessa. It turns out Maria is trying to help Vanessa loosen up and recapture her love for dancing, amid the pressure she is feeling as the lead.... A low mark Bianca received on an assignment leaves her unmotivated to work with Jax on their current project. Jax senses she needs a break and has her go outside the classroom to write lyrics. She gets frustrated over it and decides she is going to fail her assignment with Jax, but when she discovers Denzel found and liked one of her discarded sets of lyrics, it raises her spirits. Guest stars: Pippa Leslie, Dewshane Williams Absent: Josh Bogert as Miles, Aviva Mongillo as Alya, Romy Weltman as Kit, Chris Hoffman as Park, Jane Moffat as Helsweel
12	12	"Plays Well with Others"	Warren P. Sonoda	Jennifer Pertsch	June 3, 2016	July 10, 2016	1.03
Cassandra feels Vanessa is being held back in her training with the Primas. Vanessa's nagging ankle injury is one of those hurdles, but she keeps that from Cassandra and instead talks about friend issues. This leads Cassandra to talk to Carly, effectively keeping her from spending time with Vanessa, but when Vanessa finds out and stands up for Carly, Cassandra dismisses her from the Primas.... Park gets the music class involved in a cappella groups, though Scarlett is uncomfortable with the idea. With Kit's help, she puts together an effort blending her vocals to sound like a group, confident Park will be impressed. Park listens to her production but gives Scarlett a lesson on how the group provides something to a song she cannot by herself.... Miles wants to ask Julie out and needs Jax's help. They hack into Julie's computer so Miles can deliver his message, except when he identifies himself as "Miles", Julie is clueless. The apparent rejection allows Alya to ask him out, and Miles accepts, but when Julie eventually figures Miles was the one who sent the message to her computer, she is flattered and the two agree to date after mid-terms. As this happens right in front of Alya, it leaves her betrayed. Guest star: Madison MacGregor Absent: Julia Tomasone as Bianca, Adrianna Di Liello as Jenna, Colin Petierre as Sasha, Isiah Hall as Denzel, Jane Moffat as Helsweel
13	13	"Hold On"	Mario Azzopardi	Matt Schiller	June 10, 2016	July 17, 2016	0.86
Carly feels guilty about Vanessa getting kicked out of the Primas and wants to help her, but when Jenna capitalizes on Vanessa's misery by taking her spot in dance class, Carly gets revenge. This causes turmoil during rehearsal, and Helsweel gives Carly, Jenna and Vanessa detention, where each is put through intense dance drills. It is the last thing Vanessa needs with her injured ankle, which is getting worse.... Denzel's 14th birthday is coming up, and he feels he has not achieved extraordinary feats as an artist in his young life to this point. Kit tries to cheer him up, and reminds him that many famous people became successful later in life. She also gives him the opportunity to design the cover art for the next DJ Diamondmind single.... After finding random pieces of lyrical poetry scattered around school, the music class wonders who the "yellow pad poet" is, and Bianca tries admitting she is that poet, to their disbelief. Jax is aware she is, since he gave her a yellow pad to inspire her for their duet assignment, which happens to be due. With Park preparing to hear their presentation, Bianca fears the worst about her lyrics, but Jax finds a way to make it work. Absent: Kyal Legend as Julie
14	14	"Twelve Hours to Showtime"	Mario Azzopardi	Lara Azzopardi	June 17, 2016	July 24, 2016	1.35
When Carly sees Vanessa in pain following a final rehearsal before the mid-term show, Vanessa is forced to come clean to Carly about her ankle injury. Sasha finds out as well after he notices Carly looking up information about the injury on her phone, and they both agree Vanessa should not dance in the show. Realizing how far she has come, Vanessa is not about to give up on her moment and traps Carly in the locker room to prevent her from informing a teacher about the injury.... Denzel tells Julie that no one from his family is coming to the dance show. Julie discovers Denzel actually never asked his parents and encourages him to invite them, to show them how talented he is as the show's costume designer.... With Alya enjoying the opening night success of Da Bohème, Miles feels she is unprepared for their mid-term duet assignment, particularly after she forgets words to the song they are performing. Miles asks Park for an extension, claiming health-related setbacks. Alya is not pleased with what Miles did, and neither is Park, who finds out from Miles' mother that he has been fine and thus expects Miles and Alya to be ready with their duet during the dance show's intermission. Guest star: Pippa Leslie Absent: Julia Tomasone as Bianca, Romy Weltman as Kit
15	15	"Showtime"	Director X	Lara Azzopardi	June 24, 2016	July 31, 2016	1.03
Having learned of Vanessa's injury, Maria is compelled to pull her out of the dance show until Vanessa convinces Maria not to, despite being warned what could happen. Thinking Carly betrayed her by revealing the injury, Vanessa gets angry and ends their friendship, but Sasha tells Carly he was the one who went to Maria, leaving Carly angry at him. During the show, the worst does happen to Vanessa while landing on her tender ankle after a jump; she needs to go to the hospital, and Carly takes her place in the show.... Alya is given an opportunity to tour with Da Bohème, but while reflecting on her time at Keaton, she overhears what Miles tells Julie about her. It upsets her and makes her determined to leave Keaton, even after Miles finds out and apologizes. After Bianca gives her some advice about the tour, and Miles, Alya decides to stay for the duet but is still leaving.... Jax asks Bianca to sit with him at the show, but thinking it is a date and unsure of what to do next, he asks Kit for advice. When Bianca invites another student to sit with her and Jax, then refers to Jax as a "good friend", it leaves him distraught.... Denzel brings Julie's parents to the show, much to Julie's shock. Guest stars: Pippa Leslie, Arnold Pinnock (Gary Maslany – Julie's father), Carly Street Absent: Chris Hoffman as Park, Jane Moffat as Helsweel
16	16	"Restart"	Director X	Jill Girling & Lori Mather-Welch	September 9, 2016	September 12, 2016	0.74
The first semester ends with Julie's parents taking her out of Keaton and Alya leaving Keaton for the Da Bohème tour. The next semester starts two weeks later, with Scarlett stepping up as the new student body president in Julie's absence. Denzel wonders how Scarlett is funding the dance parties she is planning and decides to impeach her. While Denzel is getting signatures for the impeachment, Kit finds out his motives stem from missing Julie, who eventually returns to Keaton.... Bianca becomes jealous over Jax hanging out with Jenna. She asks Miles to find out from Jax what is going on; Miles discovers Jax is indeed more into Jenna than Bianca, but he lies to Bianca to spare her feelings.... As Vanessa is sidelined while recovering from her ankle injury, she is still angry at Carly over her telling Sasha about the injury. Vanessa is confident she will be dancing again in a week, when the cast on her ankle is removed, but the doctor informs her the ankle is not healing as it should, and she will be dealing with a longer period of recovery and physical therapy. Guest stars: Pippa Leslie, Arnold Pinnock Absent: Jane Moffat as Helsweel
17	17	"Juggle"	Warren P. Sonoda	Kate Hewlett	September 16, 2016	September 13, 2016	0.75
Carly and Sasha are among those chosen by Helsweel to audition for the Primas, to fill Vanessa's spot. Throughout the process, Carly and Vanessa's feuding constantly tests Sasha. He wants to stay friends with both of them, but backs away from Carly when she forces him to choose between the two, making things more awkward after Helsweel announces that both Carly and Sasha have made the Primas.... With Julie's parents making a list of conditions for her to stay at Keaton, Julie has little time for extracurricular activities, so she allows Scarlett to continue as student body president. Julie stays on the student council as a "silent observer" but is clearly itching to be president again when she repeatedly interrupts Scarlett during a meeting. After both pitch their ideas for the end-of-year open house, and Julie is swamped by her studies, the two make a compromise and decide to share the job of president.... Miles feels left out when Jax spends time with Jenna, and then Kit. Jax realizes Miles misses Alya and invites him to a movie with Jenna; though Miles does not want to be a third wheel, Jax tells him that Jenna is wanting to know more about him. Absent: Aviva Mongillo as Alya, Adrianna Di Liello as Jenna, Chris Hoffman as Park
18	18	"Eyes Forward"	Warren P. Sonoda	Kate Hewlett	September 23, 2016	September 14, 2016	0.78
Carly vows she will not do anything to get kicked out of the Primas, unlike Vanessa. A film student who is shooting footage for Keaton's web site continuously affects Carly's focus both in dance class and with the Primas. Carly makes it clear to him that she cannot be distracted, and he tries to comply.... Denzel's idea for the open house is to make a music video featuring the entire Keaton student body, hoping to impress and surprise Julie. Although he distributes fliers throughout the school about the video, no one comes to the first meeting. When Julie and Scarlett later show up, Denzel rethinks his approach for the video.... Jenna becomes suspicious about Jax when she hears about his involvement with Kit, so she asks Bianca to find out. As Bianca herself wonders where she stands with Jax, she becomes angry after finally learning the truth about it from Miles, which subsequently springs into her idea for the open house—girls vs. boys in a battle of bands. When spying on Jax and Kit, Bianca discovers Kit's secret identity, as DJ Diamondmind, but she sees they are not dating; nevertheless, she lets Jenna believe her suspicions were right, leading her to break up with Jax. Guest stars: Michael Kaplan (Austin), Madison MacGregor Absent: Aviva Mongillo as Alya
19	19	"Once in a Lifetime"	RT!	Matt Schiller	September 30, 2016	September 15, 2016	0.64
Alya returns to Keaton and spends a little time with Miles, but she plans to continue on the Da Bohème tour, in England. Before she possibly leaves Keaton forever, Miles brings Alya into the studio to record their duet, so she will remember him. When Alya reveals she is not happy on the tour, Miles persuades her to stay.... A scout from Juilliard School comes to Keaton and notices Julie's dancing. Although she is not in the dance program, the scout offers her the opportunity to attend Juilliard, but the only day he is available to evaluate her happens to be the same day Julie is taking the PSAT. With all the increased pressure for her to keep up at Keaton, and now this latest opportunity, Julie gives in and pays someone to sit for her at the exam.... Vanessa struggles emotionally with not being able to dance, especially for the visiting scout. Maria suggests that Vanessa find an outlet to express herself during her down time. When she notices some street dancers outside, Vanessa offers to help them improve their technique, against Sasha's warnings about those people. Guest stars: Stephanie Caldeira (Sloane), Pippa Leslie, Chris Young (Francesco Gilles) Absent: Julia Tomasone as Bianca, Adrianna Di Liello as Jenna, Mckenzie Small as Scarlett, Romy Weltman as Kit, Chris Hoffman as Park, Jane Moffat as Helsweel
20	20	"Da Capo"	RT!	Matt Schiller	October 7, 2016	September 16, 2016	0.82
Carly has been hanging out secretly with Austin, the film student she encountered shortly after becoming a Prima. After overhearing the gossip about Austin's past relationships, and not knowing the names of his ex-girlfriends, Carly wonders if he truly cares about her when he never refers to her by her actual name. He shows that he does know her name, even though he does not verbally communicate it.... Alya is readmitted into Keaton and becomes aware that she has to work with Bianca this semester for the open house project. Bianca attempts to intimidate Alya after hearing about her giving up Da Bohème to come back to Keaton, but Alya shows Bianca she is not a quitter.... Jax and Kit get into an argument over one of her songs, as in his mind, it brings into question the gender of DJ Diamondmind to fans. Any attempt to tweak the song fails to satisfy Kit, so she sends the original version to her record label, which turns it down. Kit gives Jax credit on the song as an assistant consultant, despite not taking his advice.... Miles receives a call from his mother that a kidney donor has been found, and he is scheduled to have surgery right away. Guest stars: Michael Kaplan, Dewshane Williams Absent: Adrianna Di Liello as Jenna, Mckenzie Small as Scarlett, Isiah Hall as Denzel, Kyal Legend as Julie, Chris Hoffman as Park, Jane Moffat as Helsweel
21	21	"Friend or Foe"	Lara Azzopardi	Scott Oleszkowicz	October 14, 2016	September 19, 2016	0.70
While choreographing for Sloane and the "Streets", Vanessa accidentally breaks a side mirror on Maria's car with her crutch. Maria seeks to have Principal Durani shut down the group, but Vanessa suggests they audition to become an official dance club at Keaton, which would entitle them to studio space for rehearsals. Their audition satisfies Maria and Helsweel, but not Cassandra, who is obligated to yield some of the time the Primas use the studio.... Denzel is looking for someone to direct his music video; he and Scarlett evaluate prospects but come up empty. Denzel then meets Austin, impressed by his filming background, but it takes some convincing to get him to be the video's director. As one condition, Austin wants Alya in the video as the singer, rather than Scarlett.... While Miles undergoes kidney transplant surgery, Alya, Jax and Bianca are in music class thinking about him and hoping for the best. They work on a get-well song for him and later perform it in his hospital room after he is out of surgery. Guest stars: Stephanie Caldeira, Michael Kaplan, Pippa Leslie, Madison MacGregor Absent: Alyssa Trask as Carly, Adrianna Di Liello as Jenna, Colin Petierre as Sasha, Kyal Legend as Julie, Chris Hoffman as Park
22	22	"Verite"	Lara Azzopardi	Scott Oleszkowicz	October 21, 2016	September 20, 2016	0.77
Maria gives Vanessa the responsibility of choreographing a dance for Carly, Sasha and Jenna. When Carly is directed to assume the stance of a rock, lacking any kind of dancing, she questions what Vanessa is doing. Despite the two's severed friendship, Maria advises Carly to trust Vanessa's abilities as a choreographer. Later, Vanessa finds out her ankle has healed enough for the cast to be removed.... When Scarlett receives an assignment to write a song which connects to her musical roots, she struggles with it because she is unsure whether her birth parents had anything to do with those roots. Kit reminds her that their adoptive parents are a huge influence in where they both are in music.... When Principal Durani wants to talk to Julie regarding the PSAT, she becomes uncomfortable and decides to tell Denzel what she did to clear her conscience. Durani congratulates her on getting the highest PSAT score in Keaton history and wants her photo to go on the Keaton web site in honor of her achievement. Julie realizes she needs to come clean with Durani, though Denzel fears seeing her taken out of Keaton again. Guest stars: Pippa Leslie, Ish Morris (Ryland Marcus), Dewshane Williams Absent: Josh Bogert as Miles, Aviva Mongillo as Alya, Matthew Isen as Jax, Julia Tomasone as Bianca, Chris Hoffman as Park, Jane Moffat as Helsweel
23	23	"Step Up"	Director X	Lauren Gosnell	October 28, 2016	September 21, 2016	0.62
Julie is allowed to continue at Keaton following the PSAT incident. Her focus shifts toward getting into Juilliard, and she wants Maria to help improve her dancing. However, as Julie brought up Maria during the discussion of disciplinary action for her cheating on the PSAT, Principal Durani interrogates Maria about her involvement in this. It leads to Maria being dismissed from teaching at Keaton.... Vanessa's cast is finally off, and despite being cleared by her doctor to dance again, she fears reinjuring her ankle. Sasha knows it is all in Vanessa's head, and he tells her she can only overcome this obstacle by dancing.... Miles' relationship with Alya is put to the test when he sees her singing to Austin for Denzel's music video. Miles stands up to Austin and makes it clear that he is her boyfriend. Guest stars: Michael Kaplan, Pippa Leslie, Arnold Pinnock, Dewshane Williams Absent: Julia Tomasone as Bianca, Mckenzie Small as Scarlett, Romy Weltman as Kit, Chris Hoffman as Park, Jane Moffat as Helsweel
24	24	"Ensemble"	Director X	Lauren Gosnell	November 4, 2016	September 22, 2016	0.67
After Maria is let go, Julie tries to make it up to the dance class by getting them involved in her art presentation for the open house. Initially, Vanessa and Sasha are the only ones on board, but Carly gets the others to join, though she has a motive to get back at Julie. When Julie talks one-on-one with Carly about Maria, Carly has a change of heart and needs to defuse her revenge plans. With Vanessa's help, she starts a fire in the school, and the alarm and sprinklers go off.... Carly's attitude toward Julie makes Vanessa wonder why Carly has changed. Vanessa is aware of Carly's dating Austin and tries to unearth the truth about him as Keaton's heartbreaker.... In digging for information about her birth parents, Scarlett unexpectedly comes across a letter that is from those of her sister. Kit refuses to open the envelope and wants it discarded, but Scarlett lets her sister know that she loves her and their adoptive parents, no matter what either finds out about their birth parents. Kit then decides she wants to read the letter, but the fire sprinkler incident ruins it. Guest star: Michael Kaplan Absent: Josh Bogert as Miles, Aviva Mongillo as Alya, Julia Tomasone as Bianca, Isiah Hall as Denzel, Chris Hoffman as Park, Jane Moffat as Helsweel
25	25	"After the Flood"	Wendy Morgan	Kate Hewlett	November 11, 2016	September 23, 2016	0.92
The music students need to recreate their work for the open house after the fire sprinkler damage to the school destroyed their recordings. Jax reaches his boiling point after what he has been through all semester. Bianca comes clean with Jax, saying she caused Jenna to break up with him, but after she and her girl band perform their new song in class, Jax reveals he has had feelings for Bianca all along.... Vanessa and Sasha warn Carly about Austin after they see his temper, and when she does not listen, Sasha posts Carly and Austin's relationship on his blog. Carly is afraid this will jeopardize her position with the Primas, but the one let go is Sasha. Regarding her dating Austin, Carly calls it quits because, as Vanessa and Sasha have been trying to get her to see, he has failed to treat her with respect.... Julie asks Jenna to help improve her dancing by coaching her. While she has not forgotten Julie's part in Maria's dismissal, Jenna decides to coach Julie, but her allegiance with the dance class is split. Julie sees the honest side of Jenna and encourages her to stand up for herself in dance class. Guest stars: Michael Kaplan, Madison MacGregor Absent: Mckenzie Small as Scarlett, Romy Weltman as Kit, Isiah Hall as Denzel, Jane Moffat as Helsweel
26	26	"Try Again"	Wendy Morgan	Matt Schiller	November 18, 2016	September 26, 2016	0.72
Following his ouster from the Primas, Sasha pleads with Vanessa to become part of the Streets. He auditions and while Sloane thinks he is good, she does not let him join because of his TMK blog. Sasha proves he is worthy of becoming part of the group by deleting his blog account.... Principal Durani interrogates Carly and Jenna about the fire sprinklers. While the two confess about plotting revenge against Julie, they keep quiet about their part in the sprinklers going off. They attempt investigating on their own, and Jenna considers Vanessa the prime suspect until she sees Carly is hiding something. Upon getting the truth from Carly, Jenna goes back to Durani, but Carly finds out she, Vanessa and Sasha have been spared the ultimate punishment for now.... Alya discovers the song she is singing for Denzel's music video belongs to Scarlett, so she goes to Austin wanting Scarlett back in the video. He blackmails Alya to stay in the video by threatening to expose their professional relationship as more than that to Miles. When Alya tells Kit about the incident, they urge Denzel to fire Austin, who overhears them. The girls get into heated words with Austin, but when he shoves Kit, Denzel shoves back, knocking Austin to the ground. Guest stars: Stephanie Caldeira, Michael Kaplan, Madison MacGregor, Dewshane Williams Absent: Matthew Isen as Jax, Julia Tomasone as Bianca, Kyal Legend as Julie, Chris Hoffman as Park, Jane Moffat as Helsweel
27	27	"Fallout"	Warren P. Sonoda	Scott Oleszkowicz	November 18, 2016	September 27, 2016	0.84
All of Keaton finds out about the confrontation involving Austin, Alya, Kit and Denzel. Principal Durani calls Kit to his office to get her side; he also needs to hear from Denzel, who is nowhere to be found. Kit goes looking for him, and Scarlett helps. When they do find him and Denzel is ready to see Durani, he has support from many students, who join him in Durani's office.... Miles has been on edge about Alya's involvement with Austin and continues to be even after what happened to Austin, particularly when Alya texts him to find out if he is okay. Alya discovers Miles has problems with trust, stemming from his parents' separation, and they resolve to trust and be honest with each other.... Vanessa and Carly are paired by Helsweel for the final exam in dance class, which helps the two repair their friendship, though Carly is a little aloof following what she has heard about Austin's bullying. While preparing for the final, Vanessa gets a disturbing text which threatens to expose a secret. She initially thinks it is about a brief kiss between her and Sasha that she worries Carly knows about. Sasha gets the same text, but when Carly also gets that text, they conclude it to be about the fire sprinkler incident. Guest stars: Michael Kaplan, Dewshane Williams Absent: Chris Hoffman as Park
28	28	"Lead the Way"	Warren P. Sonoda	Scott Oleszkowicz	November 25, 2016	September 28, 2016	0.89
Denzel struggles as the director of his music video, with his dancers failing to work together. As Denzel sees the job as being the boss, Scarlett encourages him to approach it differently, being more a leader than the boss. The change results in better communication with his dancers.... Bianca is ready to date Jax but suffers a setback in planning it. Park catches her taking a phone call about a reservation during class, leading to her phone being confiscated plus detention. Jax salvages Bianca's effort by finding a way to join her in detention for their date.... The open house is nearing, but ticket sales are falling short of expectation, particularly for a fundraiser being held by Vanessa, Carly, Jenna and Sasha to help pay for what was lost or damaged due to the fire sprinklers. As they prepare to attract more people from a bigger venue, a new mysterious text pops up, this time exposing Vanessa and Sasha's kiss to everyone at Keaton. While the text upsets the two and Carly, Sasha realizes his deleted TMK blog account is being hacked, later discovering Jenna is behind it, and those texts. Absent: Romy Weltman as Kit, Kyal Legend as Julie, Jane Moffat as Helsweel
29	29	"Me"	Lara Azzopardi	Lara Azzopardi	December 2, 2016	September 29, 2016	0.87
The Streets feel they belong in the open house. While Helsweel tells them that they and the Primas cannot both be showcased, and that Francesco Gilles, the scout from Juilliard, is coming to Keaton again to look for the best performers, she allows the Streets a chance to show whether they are ready. Vanessa and Carly find their friendship tested once again with this dance rivalry, plus Carly's potential spot in Juilliard's summer program is at stake.... Although Alya is feeling secure with Miles after their discussion on trust, she becomes reminded about when he was involved with Julie. Alya realizes it is in the past and is willing to let Miles help Julie with her open house project which is experiencing audio trouble. Once he fixes the problem, the two nearly exchange a kiss.... Denzel has Scarlett record many takes of her song for his music video, which leads to stress on her voice. Scarlett is also preparing the introductory speech for the open house, but while rehearsing her speech, she struggles talking through it.... Bianca gets a callback on a movie role; if she gets the part, she will be in Los Angeles during the summer. Jax worries that he will lose her, but Bianca assures him that she will not leave him. Guest stars: Stephanie Caldeira, Madison MacGregor Absent: Adrianna Di Liello as Jenna
30	30	"We"	Director X	Lara Azzopardi	December 9, 2016	September 30, 2016	0.90
The open house is underway. Scarlett has trouble speaking during her introduction, but Julie assures Scarlett she has a great voice, even though she is worrying about how much she has damaged it.... Helsweel announces the Primas will perform at the open house. She commends the Streets for their improvement, but they still need to work at getting even better. At the same time, Vanessa finds out Carly is on the short list for Juilliard's summer program, and while feeling betrayed that Carly kept this a secret, Vanessa encourages her to take advantage of the opportunity.... Jax will be spending the summer touring with DJ Diamondmind, but as Kit gives him this news, she finds out that Jax has scheduled her, as Diamondmind, to appear at the open house, and she emphatically tells Jax she does not want to do so. In encouraging her to reconsider, Jax alludes to her birth parents and ends up surprising her regarding their letter she originally did not want to read.... Miles writes a song for Alya to show what he means to her, but he cannot hide from her that he nearly kissed Julie. The revelation hardly shocks Alya, who realizes she has been lost with her music since returning to Keaton and needs to refocus on that without Miles.... Bianca does not land the movie role she was hoping for, so she will not be going to Los Angeles. She keeps that information from Jax, though she is happy he will be touring with DJ Diamondmind.... Kit finally reads the letter from her birth parents, with Scarlett helping her through it. While finishing the letter, Scarlett's voice becomes so hoarse, she finds herself unable to speak. She clearly cannot sing in Denzel's music video, putting his project in jeopardy.... After the Primas showcase their talent, they extend a gesture to the Streets members to join them on the dance floor, with Carly inviting Vanessa up first, then Cassandra doing the same for Sloane. Denzel comes up with a plan that allows Scarlett to still be in his video but adds Alya and Bianca as co-leads. Scarlett reveals the doctor found calluses on her vocal cords; she is determined to sing again, but with the nodes diagnosis, it is also a real possibility she may not.... As the school year ends, Principal Durani discovers an email from an "unknown" sender with a video that links Carly and Vanessa to the fire sprinkler incident. Guest stars: Stephanie Caldeira, Madison MacGregor, Dewshane Williams, Chris Young Absent: Chris Hoffman as Park

=== Season 2 (2017) ===
- The season was released on Netflix in the United States on September 30, 2017.

No. overall	No. in season	Title	Directed by	Written by	Canadian air date	UK air date
31	1	"And We're Back..."	RT!	Lara Azzopardi	March 12, 2018	July 28, 2017
The students are back at Keaton after the holidays. Principal Durani knows about every detail of the sprinkler incident caused by Carly and Vanessa, and makes them pay for it by helping undo the damage they have done in their free time between and after classes, starting by repainting a poster with just a tiny brush. Helsweel gets permission for Carly to leave early because she is judging auditions for the Primas, and Carly makes sure Vanessa is last so she has time to finish the work. Meanwhile, three senior music students come to mentor the sophomores, and things get awkward when Alya and Miles end up on Frances' team together. Bianca questions Jax after someone makes a post on TMK saying he cheated on her with Kit. Jax says that he did not cheat on her. She believes him, and they kiss. But Jax does not tell Bianca that Kit is DJ Diamondmind; instead, he tells Bianca that DJ Diamondmind wants her to sing on his next album. Vanessa gets to the Prima audition just in time, but she trips and gets injured, and has to be taken to a hospital. When Alya and Miles confront Frances about picking one of them, Frances immediately understands what's going on and suggests that singing together will be actually better for them. Guest stars: Stephanie Caldeira, Hailey Fauchere (Mindy), Stephanie La Rochelle (Frances), Madison MacGregor, Dewshane Williams
32	2	"Leading by Example"	RT!	Lara Azzopardi	March 13, 2018	August 4, 2017
Frances wants Scarlett as the junior student in her mentoring group, but Scarlett indicates she is still recovering from surgery on her vocal chords, despite being cleared for weeks by her doctor. Scarlett worries that she will be unable to sing again, so Kit helps her to overcome her fear. ... Carly is determined not to be like Cassandra as she welcomes two new recruits to the Primas, Mindy and Beckett. Her decision to lead by example backfires when Cassandra finds out Carly made the Prima juice that the recruits were instructed to make all by herself, so Cassandra shows Carly that the newcomers need to learn the hard way. ... Alya becomes frustrated over Frances' mentoring style when she is not told what is wrong with her singing. After she vehemently confronts Frances about the matter, Frances gets Alya to realize that the singing she heard was lacking passion. Guest stars: Hailey Fauchere, Stephanie La Rochelle, Madison MacGregor Absent: Matthew Isen as Jax, Adrianna Di Liello as Jenna, Colin Petierre as Sasha, Kyal Legend as Julie, Chris Hoffman as Park, Jane Moffat as Helsweel
33	3	"Choices"	Warren P. Sonoda	Matt Schiller	March 14, 2018	August 11, 2017
The Keaton students begin preparing for the CAMDAs—Competitions in Art, Music, Dance, and Acting—which the school is hosting. Julie is faced with whether to compete in art or dance, and feels she can contend in both disciplines by introducing a new "performance art" category. Durani tells Julie that the category will have to wait until another year, and she will need to pick either art or dance, not just for the CAMDAs but her senior year as a whole. ... The music students work on creating tracks inspired by DJ Diamondmind. This appears to be an easy task for Kit, but she fails the assignment because her sample is too identical to a Diamondmind track. As a result, Kit chooses to make a change for the next Diamondmind track, with her secret identity getting in the way. ... Sasha is furious with Jenna about what she has been posting on TMK, under his hacked account, and decides not to hang around her anymore. Hurt over losing a friend, Jenna comes clean with her next TMK entry and hopes she can regain the trust of Sasha and anyone else she has hurt. Guest stars: Stephanie Caldeira, Madison MacGregor, Corteon Moore (Matteo), Jennifer Pogue, Dewshane Williams Absent: Aviva Mongillo as Alya, Chris Hoffman as Park
34	4	"The One"	Warren P. Sonoda	Lauren Gosnell	March 15, 2018	August 18, 2017
Scarlett holds auditions for student vice president but has trouble finding the right person. One candidate, George, is blindly rejected simply because his illusionist talent is not what she is looking for. His brother, Aidan, comes down on her and only asks for George to be given a chance. After hearing more about Aidan from George, and also seeing a magic trick, Scarlett is lured into naming George vice president, to impress his brother. She later finds out Aidan is dating Cassandra. ... Helsweel announces she will mentor a male-female pair for the CAMDAs; Carly is the female, while Sasha and Beckett need to audition for the male half. Beckett shows no inclination to practice, which irritates Helsweel, but at the audition, his dancing appears too superior for Sasha, who leaves the class before his turn. ... Miles is unable to get past his break-up with Alya, which is evident as the two sing together in front of Frances. Bianca tells him that he needs to deal with his unresolved feelings. Guest stars: Robert Bazzocchi (Aidan), Joshua Kilimnik (George), Hailey Fauchere, Madison MacGregor, Stephanie La Rochelle, Emily Persich, Dewshane Williams Absent: Chris Hoffman as Park
35	5	"Take the Note"	Mario Azzopardi	Kate Hewlett	March 16, 2018	August 25, 2017
Bianca's performance of a song draws criticism from Scarlett, and though constructive, Bianca does not take it well. When she later criticizes Scarlett, particularly her love life, Alya confronts her and eventually finds out Bianca got fired by her agent. As she deals with the uncertainty of her acting career, Bianca's relationship with Jax also takes a turn after he reveals to her his kissing a backup dancer during the summer. ... As she watches Carly and Beckett practice a dance routine for the CAMDAs, Vanessa is distressed over Beckett's handling of Carly. Beckett tells Vanessa that Carly needs to improve around him or he will look for another partner. Carly herself is not happy with her partner, but Vanessa eventually relays to her what Beckett said. ... With Julie deciding to focus on dance during the school year, she struggles to establish her identity as a dancer. Cassandra sees that and tells her she needs to find that identity to succeed in the program. Guest stars: Robert Bazzocchi, Joshua Kilimnik, Stephanie La Rochelle, Corteon Moore, Madison MacGregor Absent: Adrianna Di Liello as Jenna, Chris Hoffman as Park
36	6	"Gotta Be Strong"	Mario Azzopardi	Kate Hewlett	March 23, 2018	September 1, 2017
Jenna adds her and Sasha to the list of duets at the CAMDAs and wants to get on his good side again. She puts some sticky notes into his locker but discovers he has power bars and other performance-enhancers in there. With Sasha upset about her invading his locker, Jenna tries to convince him that he is a great dancer without that stuff, even if he feels he will never be as strong as Beckett. ... Jax wants Miles to talk to Bianca about his cheating on her. With the argument being about a meaningless kiss, Bianca sends a message back to Jax by kissing Miles. It later turns into a bigger argument between Jax and Bianca, one that Miles wants to stay out of, as it resembles the kind his divorced parents have had. ... Helsweel gives Vanessa the impression that she has done something wrong. When Vanessa talks to Helsweel about it, she finds out Beckett is at Keaton on probation and is advised to stay away from him. After Vanessa accidentally mentions the probation to Beckett, he explodes in anger at Helsweel. During the altercation, Vanessa and Carly overhear Beckett calling Helsweel "mom". Guest stars: Stephanie Caldeira, Joshua Kilimnik Absent: Aviva Mongillo as Alya, Mckenzie Small as Scarlett, Romy Weltman as Kit, Kyal Legend as Julie, Chris Hoffman as Park
37	7	"In Her Shadow"	Director X	Scott Oleszkowicz	March 30, 2018	January 13, 2018
Beckett gets fed up with Helsweel's criticism of his preparation for the CAMDAs and decides to quit. This leaves Carly without her duet partner, so she and Vanessa try to persuade Beckett to change his mind. Helsweel assures the two girls that he will, but Carly is not so sure about that. ... Scarlett gives George an assignment to print a photo to be added to the CAMDA programs. While working on the photo, George loses his wristband and panics, unable to concentrate until he finds it. He goes to his brother, Aidan, for help, but Scarlett ends up giving him a hand, looking through the school's garbage bin. ... Kit is about to finish the latest DJ Diamondmind track, which has Bianca's vocals remaining. At first, Bianca refuses to complete her part of the project because of Jax, but she goes ahead and sings. Kit is later troubled by a review of the new track, which is intended to be a new direction for her, separate from her alter ego. Because she cannot seem to escape from Diamondmind's shadow in the public's eye, she retires the DJ forever. Guest stars: Robert Bazzocchi, Joshua Kilimnik, Hailey Fauchere Absent: Josh Bogert as Miles, Aviva Mongillo as Alya, Matthew Isen as Jax, Kyal Legend as Julie, Chris Hoffman as Park
38	8	"Control"	Director X	Scott Oleszkowicz	April 6, 2018	January 14, 2018
Carly wants Vanessa to choreograph dance routines for the Primas to increase their chances of winning in the CAMDA qualifiers, but Cassandra is not on board with the idea. She still holds bitterness toward Vanessa and refuses to use her choreography because she fears Vanessa is a better dancer. That leaves Carly and Cassandra to do their own choreography with qualifiers right around the corner. ... Miles' new song has Alya rattled because the message behind it reflects the rockiness of their relationship. Frances has been sensing the rift from their vocal delivery and praises Miles' bold lyrics. Alya fights back with a song of her own just as powerful, but she issues an ultimatum to Frances ahead of the qualifiers, threatening to quit the group if she is not allowed to sing her music solo, without Miles. ... Jax does not want Kit to quit on DJ Diamondmind and has trouble accepting the retirement. Hoping he can get Kit to change her mind, he puts together a tribute to remind her of how great the music was, but Kit sticks to her decision. Guest stars: Hailey Fauchere, Stephanie La Rochelle, Madison MacGregor Absent: Adrianna Di Liello as Jenna, Colin Petierre as Sasha, Mckenzie Small as Scarlett, Thomas L. Colford as Beckett, Kyal Legend as Julie, Chris Hoffman as Park, Jane Moffat as Helsweel
39	9	"Qualifiers: Day 1"	Director X	Lauren Gosnell	April 13, 2018	TBA
With the CAMDA qualifiers underway, Frances is insistent on having Miles and Alya sing duet despite Alya's ultimatum, though Miles chooses to honor the ultimatum and sing backup. Alya's mother comes to support her daughter, but that becomes a distraction while Alya gets further criticism from Frances about needing to grow up. With Alya's mother in the audience, she freezes on her solo, unable to sing a note. ... As the Primas perform their qualifier routine, Cassandra gets distracted when Aidan, her boyfriend, leaves the auditorium with Scarlett. She ends up stealing Vanessa's choreography, which had been set for Mindy's solo. Despite the setback, with Vanessa's coaching, Mindy gains confidence with an improvised dance for her qualifier. Aidan explains to Cassandra that he needed to be with George while she was dancing, leading to a break in their relationship. ... Cassandra reveals to Vanessa that she was the one who sent the video documenting the sprinkler incident to Principal Durani, as a test of Vanessa and Carly's close friendship. Upon confronting Carly about this news, and upset she could keep something that important from her, Vanessa wonders where Carly's loyalty stands, with her or Cassandra, and feels she can no longer trust her enough for them to stay friends. Guest stars: Robert Bazzocchi, Stephanie La Rochelle, Hailey Fauchere, Madison MacGregor, Janet Porter (Mrs. Kendrick) Absent: Matthew Isen as Jax, Adrianna Di Liello as Jenna, Colin Petierre as Sasha, Thomas L. Colford as Beckett, Kyal Legend as Julie, Chris Hoffman as Park, Jane Moffat as Helsweel
40	10	"Qualifiers: Day 2"	Director X	Lauren Gosnell	April 20, 2018	TBA
While Julie is nervously preparing to do her dance for her CAMDA qualifier, she notices Maria, who persuaded her to get into dance and accept a Juilliard offer but is now teaching at a competing school. Julie fails to make the CAMDA finals and wants to give up on dancing, but Maria advises her not to simply because of the setback. ... One of Maria's students is at the CAMDAs, whose name is Katy. She happens to be the dancer Jax kissed during the summer, and just happens to run into Jax while he is fighting to get back with Bianca, who sees his involvement with Katy was more than just the kiss. It is enough for Bianca to end their relationship. ... Beckett is concerned over Sasha's health and training ahead of his duet with Jenna, dehydration among the problems. During a warmup, Sasha fails to lift Jenna and tries to save her from a fall, but Jenna hits her head on the floor. She appears to be okay and they go ahead with their qualifier, but afterward, following a successful performance, Jenna collapses. Guest stars: Joshua Kilimnik, Pippa Leslie, Dewshane Williams Absent: Devyn Nekoda as Vanessa, Aviva Mongillo as Alya, Chris Hoffman as Park
41	11	"Wrong Side of a Love Song"	Mario Azzopardi	Floyd Kane	April 27, 2018	January 15, 2018
With Jenna dealing with a concussion from the qualifiers, Sasha gets paired with another female dancer for the CAMDA finals. Because of what happened to Jenna, Beckett worries that Sasha will hurt this girl if he does lifts, especially with how he has been training. Beckett's persistence with the warning eventually prompts Sasha to realize it could happen again, and he goes to Helswell to drop out of the CAMDAs. ... George's CAMDA project involves photographing Cassandra's dancing, but when Mindy informs him that Cassandra is unavailable and then shows him one of her poses, George switches to Mindy as his subject. As he works with her, George's attitude ends up getting in the way and causes Mindy to leave. When he sees how his pictures turned out, though, he compiles them and later shows Mindy, who is amazed at them. ... Bianca and Scarlett work on writing a love song for the CAMDA finals. With her break-up with Jax still fresh, Bianca decides to focus on the cheating woman in the song, which affects Scarlett's mindset in her pursuit of Aidan, as she does not want to be seen as the "other girl". Even after Aidan tells her it is over with Cassandra, Scarlett feels it better to just be friends with him. Guest stars: Robert Bazzocchi, Joshua Kilimnik, Hailey Fauchere, Madison MacGregor, Stephanie La Rochelle Absent: Matthew Isen as Jax, Adrianna Di Liello as Jenna, Romy Weltman as Kit, Kyal Legend as Julie, Chris Hoffman as Park
42	12	"Shake It Off"	Mario Azzopardi	Matt Schiller	May 4, 2018	January 16, 2018
Park has his students pair up to write a score for a film scene they view in class. Miles and Jax have differing opinions about what music to use, with Jax wanting to respark what he had with Bianca but Miles wanting him to let go. ... Alya decides to skip Park's assignment, leaving Bianca to do that by herself, while she pitches her song for the CAMDA finals to Frances. It has potential, but Frances advises Alya to keep her ego in check as they work together on it. Scarlett helps out by providing her vocals to the song, which distresses Alya when she gets no credit at all for hers. Frances reminds Alya that her writing the song is also a deserving credit. ... As Helsweel praises Mindy for coming so far with her solo, she tells Vanessa that for it to win at the CAMDAs, she needs to take the choreography to the next level. She wonders what that means and looks to Beckett for advice, wanting him to be her coach, but after they kiss and feel uncomfortable around each other, Vanessa calls Maria to help with the choreography. Guest stars: Stephanie Caldeira, Hailey Fauchere, Stephanie La Rochelle, Pippa Leslie Absent: Alyssa Trask as Carly, Adrianna Di Liello as Jenna, Colin Petierre as Sasha, Romy Weltman as Kit, Kyal Legend as Julie
43	13	"Clear Eyes"	Warren P. Sonoda	Matt Schiller	May 11, 2018	January 17, 2018
Following the Primas' fourth-place showing in the CAMDA qualifiers, Cassandra looks to improve their standing by integrating Sloane's street dance group into the Primas, renaming the new bunch the Prima Crew. Carly is one who is not on board with this diversity and thinks Cassandra's becoming more friendly with Vanessa, after stealing her choreography, is affecting her judgment. ... Julie questions getting into a serious relationship with Miles after he makes an immature joke about her CAMDA-winning artpiece. Not helping matters is Jax hanging around as a third wheel while the two have lunch together, but Julie sees Miles is not ready when his body language indicates he still has feelings for Alya. ... Since she retired DJ Diamondmind, Kit has lost her musical creativity and Bianca tries to get her to loosen up. When Bianca suggests throwing water balloons as a means of releasing the tension, Kit starts feeling better, but the two carry it too far and eventually get caught by Durani. Sitting in the principal's office, Kit realizes from the experience that it is time to take a break from Keaton. Guest stars: Stephanie Caldeira, Hailey Fauchere, Sydney Kuhne (Azadeh), Corteon Moore, Madison MacGregor, Dewshane Williams Absent: Adrianna Di Liello as Jenna, Chris Hoffman as Park, Jane Moffat as Helsweel
44	14	"Mixing It Up"	RT!	Lara Azzopardi	May 18, 2018	January 18, 2018
The new Prima Crew is not improving toward their goal for CAMDAs. As Vanessa and Mindy are currently being mentored by Maria, who coaches Tumpane Tours, Keaton's main competitor, Carly suggests Vanessa get hold of Tumpane's choreography plans to gain an advantage. Vanessa refuses to resort to such tactics, but Mindy takes photos of Tumpane's notes while Maria takes a phone call. To play fair, Vanessa decides to give Keaton's choreography notes to Tumpane, which leads Cassandra to take a vote on whether to retain the Prima Crew or return to the original Primas for the CAMDA finals. ... While getting supplies to set up for a CAMDA mixer party, Scarlett runs into Aidan again. She is still not interested in dating him, but Aidan sets the record straight by telling her that his break-up with Cassandra had nothing to do with her. ... Kit has decided to leave Keaton but is afraid to tell Jax. Bianca, discontent over seeing her go, ends up revealing the news in front of Jax before he hears it from Kit. Devastated at first, Jax assures Kit that they will still be friends, even if they are no longer classmates. Guest stars: Stephanie Caldeira, Sydney Kuhne, Robert Bazzocchi, Joshua Kilimnik, Hailey Fauchere, Madison MacGregor, Pippa Leslie, Dewshane Williams Absent: Aviva Mongillo as Alya, Adrianna Di Liello as Jenna, Kyal Legend as Julie
45	15	"In the Dark"	RT!	Lara Azzopardi	May 25, 2018	TBA
Jenna returns to school, in time for the CAMDA finals. Sasha welcomes her back, but she no longer wants to be around him, unfollowing and unfriending him in social media. Not even a sincere apology from Sasha is enough for Jenna to forgive what happened to her during qualifiers. ... After Beckett casts the deciding vote to keep the Prima Crew intact, Carly quits the group, risking her status as a Prima. As the finals get going, a power outage occurs during the Prima Crew's turn, allowing Vanessa to look for Carly and convince her to return to the Prima Crew. Vanessa finds out more is going on with Carly, who reveals that her father has lost his job. ... The power outage adds to Frances' worries, as she has more on the line with her performance, with a scout from Berklee College of Music in attendance. After Alya opts for an acoustic performance of their song, Frances allows her to become her duet partner instead of Scarlett. Keaton wins the music competition, and Frances thanks Alya for coming through. ... Carly pleads with Cassandra to let her back in the Prima Crew, apologizing for her abandoning them. While Cassandra allows her to perform with them for the finals, she warns that her future as a Prima is in jeopardy. Tumpane Tours is initially announced as the winner of the dance competition, but the emcee read the results incorrectly, and Keaton is actually the winner. Even with that, Cassandra dismisses Carly from the Primas. Guest stars: Stephanie Caldeira, Hailey Fauchere, Joshua Kilimnik, Stephanie La Rochelle, Madison MacGregor, Andrew Musselman Absent: Matthew Isen as Jax, Romy Weltman as Kit, Chris Hoffman as Park
46	16	"Prima Donna"	Warren P. Sonoda	Kate Hewlett	April 13, 2019	January 23, 2018
The students return from their break, with the music students getting their new semester project from Park, each working on an EP that reflects their artistry. Alya is asked by Miles to contribute vocals to his EP, but realizes it will involve collaborating with his girlfriend, Julie, whom she never thought to be a singer. ... Scarlett volunteers to sing backup on Bianca's EP, but the recordings become a mess. Neither is adept at the production boards, with Scarlett fueling Bianca's frustration when she tries to work the controls. After admitting to Bianca that she misses Kit at school, Scarlett brings Jax to help with the production, though not Bianca's first choice. ... Carly is told again that she is no longer a Prima, thinking that Cassandra forgot over the break. She is determined to get back in and goes to Helsweel, wanting Cassandra removed as the Prima captain. Helsweel has both Carly and Cassandra choreograph routines to showcase their vision for the Primas, but after seeing the dancers not go for Carly's vision, followed by an exchange of offenses committed by both Carly and Cassandra during CAMDAs, Helsweel decides to disband the Primas, feeling neither girl is fit to lead them. Guest stars: Robert Bazzocchi, Joshua Kilimnik, Hailey Fauchere, Madison MacGregor, Dewshane Williams Absent: Adrianna Di Liello as Jenna, Colin Petierre as Sasha, Romy Weltman as Kit
47	17	"Best Idea" "Best Ideas"	Director X	Scott Oleszkowicz	April 20, 2019	January 24, 2018
When the Keaton students find colored books on their locker doors, they realize they are about to take on a project spanning the several disciplines at the school by tackling classic literary works. The blue group, which includes Vanessa, Alya, Bianca and Beckett, will use their dance, art and music skills to interpret "The Steadfast Tin Soldier", while the red group, which includes Carly, Miles, Julie, Mindy and Matteo, is assigned "Little Red Riding Hood", and the yellow group, which includes Jax, Jenna, Sasha, Scarlett and George, will work on "The Ugly Duckling". ... Vanessa and Beckett are the immediate choices in their group to play the leads, but the two remain disconnected following their kiss. Julie and Matteo are competing with Miles to come up with how to approach their story. George takes initiative in how to handle the rest of his group, who are not inclined to participate, by gathering them in a circle to discuss their feelings. Guest stars: Hailey Fauchere, Joshua Kilimnik, Sydney Kuhne, Corteon Moore Absent: Romy Weltman as Kit
48	18	"Caught"	Director X	Scott Oleszkowicz	TBA	January 25, 2018
Carly is looking to be cast in a hip-hop video to earn some extra money, but she needs an outfit for her audition. That becomes impossible when the "Red Riding Hood" group needs money for costume materials and everyone, including Carly, contributes $40 apiece. Unable to find clothes without shopping, and getting nowhere using some from the school's Lost and Found, she decides to retrieve the $40 she added to her group's funds, unaware that Julie sees her. ... Jax and Sasha work on the music and dance for "Ugly Duckling". When Jax notices how good Sasha's dancing is, he questions whether his own skills are good enough for the interdisciplinary project, still disturbed about Kit's departure. Sasha gives him confidence to believe in himself with his musical prowess. ... Dealing with a slump since being fired by her agent, Bianca is anxious to have an exceptional part in her group's performance of "Tin Soldier". The layoff shows as she overdoes it with her narration and singing in practice, fearing she has lost her sparkle, but a pep talk from Azadeh gets her back on track. Bianca speaks with the rest of the group, promising to scale back a little as their narrator. Guest stars: Stephanie Caldeira, Hailey Fauchere, Joshua Kilimnik, Sydney Kuhne, Stephanie La Rochelle, Corteon Moore Absent: Romy Weltman as Kit, Chris Hoffman as Park, Jane Moffat as Helsweel
49	19	"Telling Stories"	Wendy Morgan	Matt Schiller	TBA	January 29, 2018
Julie confronts Carly about the money she took and finds out about her financial problems at home. As Carly does not secure the music video spot and has no money to put back, Julie restores the $40 to the group's fund box so Matteo can purchase costume materials. Meanwhile, Miles sees Matteo as a threat when his hanging around Julie becomes more serious. ... Sasha worries about Jenna when he sees her getting dizzy while practicing. When her group discovers that she suffered a concussion, they decide not to let her dance, but Jenna assures them she is fine. In talking to Sasha later, she makes it clear that she wants to continue as a dancer, and she will let him know if she cannot handle it. ... Alya and Bianca see that Vanessa and Beckett's chemistry goes beyond what they have seen so far in their group's rehearsals. Alya gets Vanessa to share her feelings about Beckett and adds those details to a song that is later used in their performance. The judging teachers, which include Park and Helsweel, are impressed by the "Tin Soldier" interpretation, but Vanessa and Beckett are displeased over Alya's lyrics about them in the song. Guest stars: Hailey Fauchere, Joshua Kilimnik, Sydney Kuhne, Corteon Moore Absent: Romy Weltman as Kit
50	20	"Two Steps Forward"	Wendy Morgan	Matt Schiller	TBA	January 30, 2018
The "Red Riding Hood" group is ready to do their interpretation of that story. During the performance, Miles suddenly changes the music, causing confusion for the rest of the group, especially Julie. Outraged with him over the music, as well as the low grade they receive, she wants to know what is wrong, but after Miles questions her about Matteo, he breaks up with her. ... As the "Ugly Duckling" group awaits their turn, Scarlett worries she will mess up because Aidan, whom she just started dating, will be there to watch the performance. As she works on calming her nerves, George makes her confront her fear head-on by locking her in the same room with his brother. Aidan gets her to sing as if he were not in the audience. ... A few more students pick up on Helsweel being Beckett's mother, following her comment on his involvement with Vanessa. With Beckett feeling trapped having his mother at school and teacher at home, Bianca can relate and urges him to talk to his mother about it rather than leave Keaton. Even though Helsweel values Beckett more as a son than a dancer, she is willing to work on keeping the role of mother at home. Guest stars: Robert Bazzocchi, Joshua Kilimnik, Hailey Fauchere, Sydney Kuhne, Corteon Moore Absent: Romy Weltman as Kit
51	21	"Obvious"	Warren P. Sonoda	Lauren Gosnell	TBA	January 31, 2018
When Jax sees Kit sporting a different look during her brief visit at Keaton, Alya starts to think that he has a crush on Kit, despite Jax insisting they are just friends. Alya is inspired to write a song and then performs it to spur Jax into exploring his feelings for Kit. He decides to bring flowers to her house but does not stick around to see her reaction. ... Carly prepares for a music video audition before choreographer JJ Hawks. Cassandra coaches Carly and the others who are trying out, but Carly finds out Cassandra is also auditioning. While Carly makes it farther than Cassandra, she still falls short of being selected for the music video, though JJ Hawks admires her potential. ... Julie is working on her admissions essay for Juilliard and tries to express her thoughts through her art, and Matteo's help. He notices it is too soon to date Julie after Miles broke up with her, so he gives her some space. She ends up making a splendid artpiece, but with no essay to send to Juilliard, she questions her thinking outside the box. Guest stars: Madison MacGregor, Corteon Moore, Zarrin Darnell-Martin (JJ Hawks) Absent: Julia Tomasone as Bianca, Adrianna Di Liello as Jenna, Chris Hoffman as Park
52	22	"Comfort Zone"	Warren P. Sonoda	Lauren Gosnell	TBA	February 1, 2018
Bianca and Scarlett work on a music video for one of Bianca's EP songs, which involves kissing. Scarlett is uncomfortable with the idea, especially after Bianca casts Aidan in the video. Having never kissed anyone before, Scarlett finds out neither has Aidan. ... Park challenges Miles to put out a different style of music for his EP, as his work has been sounding similar. Urged to go beyond his comfort zone, Miles struggles with playing other musical instruments in expanding his artistry, but he manages to work violin into a song he presents to Park. ... Carly continues to audition for various music videos, even though her father is working again and she is finally making some money from these video jobs. These opportunities plus her end-of-the-year final exam at school, Dance of the Seasons, are stretching Carly thin and worrying Vanessa. Risking injury from overworking, even Carly is worried about whether she is going too far. During a rehearsal, Helsweel catches Carly asleep, which blows her chance at getting the lead in the Seasons project. Guest stars: Robert Bazzocchi, Sydney Kuhne Absent: Romy Weltman as Kit
53	23	"Lesson. Learned"	Mario Azzopardi	Floyd Kane	TBA	May 14, 2018
Alya's songs are irritating Bianca as the lyrics for her recent ones have been too personal about other students, first Vanessa and Beckett, then Jax and Kit. After Bianca sees Scarlett talking with Alya, she wonders whether Scarlett and Aidan are the next to be exploited, so she decides to test Alya, with Scarlett's help, by adding a false twist to the relationship. Alya comes up with a new song, clean of all that, but when she discovers Bianca and Scarlett were testing her, she walks away in resentment. ... Jenna is excited about getting her first lead, in the Seasons project. With Carly her understudy, they work together on their dances, until Vanessa helps out. This makes Jenna feel like an outsider, seeing Vanessa and Carly together, as they ignore her input about the choreography, but after she talks to the two, she realizes her being excluded was unintentional as both Vanessa and Carly were concerned about each other's problems. ... George and Azadeh are at odds about designing a weather-related set for a play Aidan is the lead in. Azadeh is going more for the feel of the set, while George cares more about how it looks, but some outside inspiration allows George to understand Azadeh's perspective. Guest stars: Joshua Kilimnik, Robert Bazzocchi, Sydney Kuhne Absent: Romy Weltman as Kit, Kyal Legend as Julie, Jane Moffat as Helsweel
54	24	"In Your Eyes"	Mario Azzopardi	Adam T. Bradley	TBA	May 15, 2018
Helsweel asks the dance students for their pitches in the Seasons show. After Jenna's unimpressive performance as the lead, Beckett asks to be excused to work on his choreography with Carly, to impress his mother. Beckett and Carly leave school grounds and get praise for their dancing from those at a street intersection, but they are caught by Park. Helsweel is outraged over the incident, prompting Beckett to give her time to cool down. ... While Matteo conducts a seminar, normally led by a teacher unavailable for this one, Julie frequently interrupts him regarding various art-related details. It irritates him so much that Julie ends up taking over the seminar. Matteo questions why Julie focuses on dance when she excels in art. ... Miles gives Jax advice on how to handle his feelings for Kit, since he has been avoiding her texts since putting flowers on the front porch of her house. Jax thinks of putting together a flash mob to surprise her, but Kit ends up surprising him with a snare drum performance from the school's band, and flowers. ... Before Beckett has a chance to talk to his mother again, Vanessa reports that Helsweel has been taken to the hospital after complaining about her vision. Guest stars: Sydney Kuhne, Corteon Moore Absent: Aviva Mongillo as Alya, Julia Tomasone as Bianca
55	25	"Clean Slate"	RT!	Scott Oleszkowicz	TBA	May 16, 2018
With Helsweel needing immediate eye surgery, the dance students are stuck with a Ukrainian teacher who does not speak English. The class has trouble focusing not just because of the language problem, but also their concern about Helsweel. Still, Beckett wants to focus on his dancing to keep his mind off that. He later finds out that his mother will be fine. ... For open mic day at Keaton, Bianca attempts to land record label executive Clive Richie. Despite Scarlett's insecurities about this, Bianca eventually convinces her that getting signed to Clive's label is the right move for both of them. Clive shows up, but when he is interested in signing just Scarlett, while Bianca is crushed, she urges Scarlett not to blow this opportunity and chooses to become her manager. ... Alya comes to school with a new look and attitude, after being hurt by Bianca and Scarlett. She has tossed out her old music, but needing to perform something for open mic, instead of writing new material she ends up showcasing one of those old songs with a different feel. That song was originally the product of Bianca and Scarlett's scheming her, called "Friends First". Guest stars: Jake Epstein (Clive Richie), Rayisa Kondracki, Sydney Kuhne Absent: Kyal Legend as Julie, Jane Moffat as Helsweel
56	26	"Not for Sale"	RT!	Kate Hewlett	TBA	May 17, 2018
After Beckett tells the dance class, from an e-mail his mother received, that Keaton is going to be shut down at the end of the school year, Vanessa and Carly head an effort to save the school. They invite the entire student body into the dance studio and plan on expanding the Seasons show to an interdisciplinary project. ... Bianca sets ground rules for Scarlett as the newest artist on Clive Richie's RTRA label, limiting what gets posted on social media, as well as when she can be with her boyfriend. When Aidan hears about this, he wants to break up with her, but changes his mind after Scarlett sings to him, going against Bianca's rules. Despite this, Bianca sees how the performance could actually help Scarlett's image. ... Julie and Matteo are excited that a painting they are completing has attracted a buyer, but when Matteo hears it is a furniture store that Julie has personal connections with, he declines the offer and criticizes her for being a sellout. Matteo later tells her that an arts and innovation center is interested in the painting, but when Julie discovers his parents run the center, the two get into a heated argument which results in Julie ruining the painting. Guest stars: Robert Bazzocchi, Sydney Kuhne, Rayisa Kondracki, Madison MacGregor, Hailey Fauchere, Corteon Moore Absent: Aviva Mongillo as Alya, Romy Weltman as Kit, Chris Hoffman as Park, Jane Moffat as Helsweel
57	27	"Legacy"	Wendy Morgan	Kate Hewlett	TBA	May 21, 2018
Principal Durani informs Miles that he is in jeopardy of failing grade 10 if he does not pull up his math grade, with an exam in that class on the line. Jax offers to tutor him after overhearing his conversation with Durani. While Miles gives Jax the impression he will do well on the exam, he is far from confident and fails to show up for it. ... Cassandra has a different vision for the Seasons project and decides to replace Jenna as the lead, not wanting the grade 10 dancers to be the spotlight in the effort to save Keaton. Jenna is set to prove that she earned that lead, but struggles with believing in herself until Vanessa, Carly, Sasha and Beckett stand behind her. After Jenna and the rest of her class audition for her, Cassandra reintegrates them into the show, with different roles. ... Bianca attempts to win Alya back as a friend, using business tactics as a manager to do so. Alya has no intention of being managed by Bianca, but gets jealous seeing her manage others and decides to give her a shot. When Alya sees Bianca is not really managing her, they get into an argument and eventually make up. Guest stars: Madison MacGregor, Dewshane Williams Absent: Mckenzie Small as Scarlett, Romy Weltman as Kit, Chris Hoffman as Park, Jane Moffat as Helsweel
58	28	"Hope"	Wendy Morgan	Lauren Gosnell & Matt Schiller	TBA	May 22, 2018
Scarlett is looking for influential people to help keep Keaton open. She also senses Julie is hiding something, getting her to talk reluctantly about Matteo, and his wealthy parents. Julie wants Scarlett not to get them involved, because of her fight with Matteo, but Scarlett eventually speaks to him after having no luck with her search. He offers to help out if Julie does not dance in the Seasons show. ... Carly and Beckett are among the dancers invited to the Primas Summer Dance Intensive, but Carly is shocked that Vanessa is not and thinks Cassandra is behind that. Vanessa is also shocked, but Cassandra sent her an invitation, which Beckett has been keeping from her because he is worried about whether they will be together during the eight weeks of the camp. ... Alya is working on an important song for Frances, and Miles offers to help her. She becomes aware of Miles' academic trouble, and it distracts her from the song. Even Frances can tell from her audition and advises Alya to deal with how she feels about Miles, but when she tries talking to him about that, he completely shuts her out. Guest stars: Robert Bazzocchi, Stephanie La Rochelle, Madison MacGregor, Corteon Moore, Rayisa Kondracki, Dewshane Williams Absent: Julia Tomasone as Bianca, Romy Weltman as Kit, Chris Hoffman as Park, Jane Moffat as Helsweel
59	29	"Almost There"	Lara Azzopardi	Lara Azzopardi	TBA	May 23, 2018
Carly gets a call from JJ Hawks to be her apprentice, with the chance of being a backup dancer for Selena Gomez, but she worries how Vanessa will take the news, since that would mean being apart for the summer. She mentions it to Cassandra, who tells Carly to accept JJ Hawks' offer. This also influences Cassandra to name Vanessa dance captain at the Prima camp. ... Hoping to be admitted into Juilliard, Cassandra finds out that she is on their waiting list instead. Julie thinks she will suffer a similar fate, but she gets in. Seeing how much Juilliard means to Cassandra, Julie gives up her spot so she can attend. ... Sasha urges Jenna to try out for Sloane's dance crew, with neither of them making Prima camp, but Sloane is graduating. The two decide to start their own dance group. ... Kit has been concerned about someone who has been posting a lot on Scarlett's social media, under the name "Curtis2001". She and Bianca are ready to bring it up with Durani when this person intends to meet Scarlett at Keaton. Upon confronting the individual in Durani's office, they discover Curtis King is his name, and he claims to be Scarlett's brother. Guest stars: Stephanie Caldeira, Madison MacGregor, Kolton Stewart (Curtis King), Dewshane Williams Absent: Josh Bogert as Miles, Aviva Mongillo as Alya, Thomas L. Colford as Beckett, Chris Hoffman as Park, Jane Moffat as Helsweel
60	30	"Apart but Together"	Director X	Lara Azzopardi	TBA	May 24, 2018
Carly finally tells Vanessa about her touring with Selena Gomez, as JJ Hawks' apprentice, but she is surprised that Vanessa is not upset. While both of them start wondering whether they care about each other anymore, they both admit they will miss each other during the summer. Vanessa's ankle is fully healed so she can take part in the Seasons show and Prima camp. ... Kit tries to inform Scarlett about Curtis, her long-lost brother, but when she gets them to meet, he backs out. While Curtis realizes the gravity of the situation, coming into Scarlett's life after all these years, Kit feels the need to protect her sister. ... Many influential people, including the head of the school board and Matteo's parents, come to view the Seasons show, as the students want them all to know they do not want Keaton shut down. Principal Durani, shocked to see such an audience, also watches the show. Despite some minor incidents, from Matteo's outburst over Julie's participation to Miles and Alya's fighting apart from their duet, Seasons impresses Durani, who stands behind his students in wanting to keep Keaton open after that performance. ... As the school year ends, with the fate of Keaton uncertain, Matteo is satisfied to hear that Julie will not be attending Juilliard, Curtis gives it one more try to meet his sister Scarlett, and Miles and Alya make up, leading to their kissing each other as they leave the school. Guest stars: Robert Bazzocchi, Hailey Fauchere, Sydney Kuhne, Stephanie La Rochelle, Madison MacGregor, Corteon Moore, Kolton Stewart, Dewshane Williams Absent: Chris Hoffman as Park, Jane Moffat as Helsweel

== See also ==
- List of Backstage characters
