= To Anyone Like Me =

2020 EP by Carys

EP by Carys
- Released: October 2, 2020
- Recorded: 2017–2020
- Length: 19:06
- Label: Warner Music Canada

Carys chronology
To Anyone Like Me (2020)	Waves (2024)

Singles from To Anyone Like Me
- 1. "Princesses Don't Cry" Released: November 12, 2019; 2. "No More" Released: June 26, 2020; 3. "Crush" Released: August 28, 2020; 4. "When a Girl" Released: October 2, 2020

To Anyone Like Me is the debut EP by Canadian singer Carys. The EP was released on October 2, 2020, through Warner Music Canada, and features the singles "Princesses Don't Cry", "No More", "Crush" and "When a Girl".

== Background ==
To Anyone Like Me acts as Carys' debut body of work, with Aviva Mongillo, who uses Carys as a stage name, having previously released an EP titled Songs About Boys (2017). Upon its release, Songs About Boys featured the song "Princesses Don't Cry"; however, after the success of the song due to its use on video-sharing platform TikTok, Mongillo transferred the song to To Anyone Like Me, and released an accompanying music video. On June 26, 2020, "No More" was released as the second single from the EP, accompanied by a music video. After the song's release, Carys explained that it was her first song that felt authentic to her, stating that her previous releases "didn't ever feel like it really encompassed every part of [her]". To Anyone Like Me was announced on August 28, 2020, alongside the release of the EP's third single, "Crush". On the song, Carys said that wrote it by "embracing [her] childish side", and that she wrote it when she met her partner at the time.

On the process of making To Anyone Like Me, Carys stated that she "was writing the songs for this EP with the intention to get out how I had been feeling about all the parts of my life I was ready to let go of and the resistance to letting go". She added that the songs were "written in a period of a lot of self-reflection and growth. The need for validation, people-pleasing, romanticising the past, fearing the future", and that "To Anyone Like Me represents the different stages of healing and the complicated journey of beginning to recognize our inherent worth". Upon the release of To Anyone Like Me, the song "When a Girl" was released as a single, with an accompanying music video.

== Reception ==
Kayla Higgins of CJRU gave To Anyone Like Me a score of 7/10. On the opening track, "Love (Validation)", Higgins praised the vulnerable lyricism, and noted that such vulnerability is rarely seen in mainstream pop music. Higgins also praised the second track, "No More", noting Carys' "angelic and powerful vocals", and went on to say that the sound of the song is "the future of pop". Higgins criticised "Crush", billing it as the weakest song on the EP, and "forgettable". She wrote that the song feels incomplete, the chorus is monotone, and that the lyrical content of the song is disappointing in contrast to the potential that the title "Crush" has. She then claimed that the final three songs on To Anyone Like Me were the "strongest and most vulnerable tracks on the record". Higgins noted that "Princesses Don't Cry" and "When a Girl" encapsulate the struggles of both life of a woman in the music industry and everyday life "elegantly", and that the running order of these tracks alongside "Maybe I'll Call You" are ordered aesthetically, again praising her vocals on the songs. Higgins concluded by saying that To Anyone Like Me is a strong debut project, noting the EP's "powerful narratives that are supported by an upbeat sound", and listed "When a Girl" and "Maybe I'll Call You" as "bops".

Amelia Cordischi of Echo praised the EP, stating that each of the songs included highlighted Carys' "ability to tell vulnerable, thought provoking, powerful, and cathartic stories wrapped in upbeat pop melodies".

== Track listing ==
To Anyone Like Me track listing
No.	Title	Writer(s)	Length
1.	"Love (Validation)"	Aviva Mongillo; Gavin Brown; Ryan Stewart	3:08
2.	"No More"	Mongillo; Brown; Stewart	3:02
3.	"Crush"	Mongillo; Brown; Kasper Holm Larsen; Stewart	2:46
4.	"When a Girl"	Mongillo; Gustav Nystrom; Hilda Stenmalm; Shy Martin	3:32
5.	"Princesses Don't Cry"	Mongillo; Andrew Austin; Elizabeth Lowell Boland	3:32
6.	"Maybe I'll Call You"	Mongillo; Brown; Stewart	3:06
Total length:			19:06
