= Annedroids =

- Series poster
- Genre: Children's comedy; Science fiction; Speculative fiction; Educational television
- Created by: J. J. Johnson
- Developed by: J.J. Johnson; Christin Simms
- Directed by: John May
- Starring: Addison Holley; Jadiel Dowlin; Adrianna Di Liello; Millie Davis; Raven Dauda
- Ending theme: "Weird Science" performed by Oingo Boingo
- Composer: Michael-Paul Ella
- Country of origin: Canada
- Original language: English
- No. of seasons: 4
- No. of episodes: 52 (list of episodes)

Production
- Executive producers: J.J. Johnson; Blair Powers; Christin Simms
- Producers: Matthew J.R. Bishop; J.J. Johnson; Blair Powers
- Editor: Rod Christie
- Running time: 26 minutes
- Production companies: Sinking Ship Entertainment; TVOntario; SRC; KiKa

Original release
- Network: Amazon Prime Video; TVOKids
- Release: July 25, 2014 – March 3, 2017

Annedroids is a Canadian CGI/live action television series created by J. J. Johnson. The series is produced by Sinking Ship Entertainment in association with broadcasters TVOntario, SRC and KiKa. Annedroids was released on Amazon Prime Video on July 25, 2014 in the UK and U.S. and premiered on August 25 on TVOKids in Ontario, Canada. The show's aim is to educate children about science, technology, engineering and math (STEM) from the perspectives of an 11-year-old girl, her friends, and her three android creations.

SRC and KiKa both agreed to opt for 26 episodes of Annedroids over two seasons, while TVO purchased four seasons. Amazon picked up Annedroids for a second season, which was released on July 2, 2015. In 2016 it was nominated for a Daytime Emmy Award for Outstanding Children's Series. Season 3 was released on June 24, 2016. The fourth and final season was released on March 3, 2017. The series was removed from Amazon Prime Video in June 2024.

The series portrays characters who support each other and solve everyday problems.

== Cast ==
=== Humans ===
- Addison Holley as Anne Sagan, the title character who is a child prodigy
- Jadiel Dowlin as Nick Clegg - Anne's friend
- Adrianna Di Liello as Shania - Anne's friend
- James Gangl as Wilbert Sagan - Anne's father
- Raven Dauda as Maggie Clegg - Nick's mother and reporter
- Jonny Gray as Zack - Nick's friend
- Jayne Eastwood as Shania's grandmother
- Joey Nijem as Garth - Shania's brother
- Nicola Correia-Damude as Ada Turing - a scientist who was Anne's friend, and main antagonist for seasons 3 and 4
- Devyn Nekoda as Charlie Cassini - one of Nick's science classmates
- Colin Mochrie as Mr. Cooper - Shania's grandmother's friend
- Naomi Snieckus as Ms. Cassini - Nick and Charlie's science teacher and Charlie's mom
- Dylan Everett as Dylan Turing - Ada's son
- Carson Reaume as Billy - Shania's brother
- Aaron Feigenbaum as Ray - Shania's brother

The Androids
Name	Initial purpose	Additional purposes	Description
Hand	Heavy lifting, power tools wielding, reaching high	Over 70 modes and tools	First, strongest and largest of Anne's androids, Hand is a three-legged construct with an arm ending with a large articulated clamp and a smaller one. She is able to lift a car and hold it still for a while.
Eyes	Look at stars, outside the junkyard and microorganisms	Shoots Anne's experiments and reports, and watches the street by the junkyard (some kind of a lookout)	Second, fastest and smallest of Anne's androids, Eyes is a camera equipped with a telescope, a three-objective microscope and binoculars. It moves thanks to a single wheel and has four short articulated arms to keep its balance. It automatically switches between lenses. All its lenses are connected to an advanced analyzer.
Pal	Assisting Anne, impact dummy	Learning everything	Third, most human-like and most sophisticated of Anne's androids, Pal is very agile and a fast runner. Pal always asks questions, as Pal is the only android with speech, and Pal is very friendly. Voiced by Millie Davis
Fangs	Guard dog	Scaring off intruders	Fourth Anne's android, Fangs behaves like an actual dog. Fangs is equipped with stinky spray, spikes, and an expandable body.

== Episodes ==
Season	Episodes	Originally released	
Season	Episodes	First released	Last released
1	13	July 25, 2014	October 30, 2014
2	13	July 2, 2015	July 5, 2015
3	13	June 24, 2016	June 24, 2016
4	13	March 3, 2017	March 3, 2017

== Awards and nominations ==
Year	Award	Category	Recipients	Result
2015	Young Artist Awards	Outstanding Young Ensemble in a TV Series	Addison Holley, Jadiel Dowlin, Adrianna Di Liello, Sinking Ship Entertainment	Won
2015	Young Artist Awards	Best Performance in a TV Series - Leading Young Actress	Addison Holley	Nominated
2015	Young Artist Awards	Best Performance in a TV Series - Leading Young Actor 13 and Under	Jadiel Dowlin	Nominated
2015	Young Artist Awards	Best Performance in a TV Series - Supporting Young Actress	Adrianna Di Liello	Nominated
2015	Joey Awards	Best Actress in a TV Comedy or Action Leading Role Age 10-15	Addison Holley, Sinking Ship Entertainment	Won
2015	Joey Awards	Young Actor Age 10-19 or Younger in a TV Series Comedy/Action Leading Role	Jadiel Dowlin	Won
2015	Joey Awards	Young Ensemble Cast in a Comedy/Action TV Series	Jadiel Dowlin	Nominated
2015	Youth Media Alliance	Grand Prize for Best Production, All Categories	Annedroids	Won
2015	Youth Media Alliance	Award of Excellence for Best Television Program, All Genres, Ages 6–8	Annedroids	Won
2015	Young Artist	Outstanding Young Ensemble in a TV Series	Annedroids	Won
2015	Daytime Emmy Award	Outstanding Directing in a Children's or Pre-School Children's Series	J.J. Johnson, Amazon Studios	Nominated
2015	Parent's Choice	Parent's Choice Silver Honour	Annedroids	Won
2016	Parent's Choice	Parent's Choice Gold Honour	Annedroids	Won
2016	Canadian Screen Awards	Best Children's or Youth Fiction Program or Series	J.J. Johnson, Blair Powers, Matthew J.R. Bishop, Christin Simms, TVO, Sinking Ship Entertainment	Nominated
2016	Canadian Screen Awards	Best Writing in a Children's or Youth Program or Series	J.J. Johnson, Christin Simms	Nominated
2016	Daytime Emmy Awards	Outstanding Cinematography	George Lajtai	Nominated
2016	Daytime Emmy Awards	Outstanding Sound Editing - Live Action	Blag Ahilov, Charles Duchesne, William Preventis, Noah Siegel, Sean W. Karp, Jakob Thiesen, Amazon Studios	Nominated
2016	Daytime Emmy Awards	Outstanding Sound Mixing - Live Action	Sean W. Karp, John Bradshaw, Blag Ahilov, Charles Duchesne, William Preventis, Noah Siegel, Amazon Studios	Nominated
2016	Daytime Emmy Awards	Outstanding Performer in a Children's or Pre-School Children's Series	Jadiel Dowlin, Amazon Studios	Nominated
2016	Daytime Emmy Awards	Outstanding Performer in a Children's or Pre-School Children's Series	Addison Holley, Amazon Studios	Nominated
2016	Daytime Emmy Awards	Outstanding Single Camera Editing	Rod Christie, Allan Cordero	Nominated
2016	Daytime Emmy Awards	Outstanding Art Direction/Set Decoration/Scenic Design	Ron Stefaniuk, Matt Middleton, Amazon Studios	Nominated
2016	Young Artist Awards	Best Performance in a TV Series - Supporting Young Actress	Adrianna Di Liello	Nominated
2016	Young Artist Awards	Best Performance in a TV Series - Leading Young Actor (14 - 21)	Jadiel Dowlin	Nominated
2016	Young Artist Awards	Outstanding Ensemble Cast in a Web or VOD Series	Addison Holley, Jadiel Dowlin, Adrianna Di Liello, Millie Davis	Nominated
2016	Fan Chile	Best Show for children 7-12	Annedroids	Won
2017	Daytime Emmy Awards	Outstanding Children's Series	Annedroids	Nominated
2017	Daytime Emmy Awards	Outstanding Writing in a Children's or Preschool Children's Series	J.J. Johnson, Christin Simms, Amanda Spagnolo	Nominated
2017	Daytime Emmy Awards	Outstanding Sound Mixing - Live Action	Sean W. Karp, John Bradshaw, Blag Ahilov, Charles Duchesne, William Preventis, Noah Siegel, Amazon Studios	Nominated
2017	Daytime Emmy Awards	Outstanding Sound Editing - Live Action	Sean W. Karp, John Bradshaw, Blag Ahilov, Charles Duchesne, William Preventis, Noah Siegel, Amazon Studios	Nominated
2017	Daytime Emmy Awards	Outstanding Performer in a Children's or Pre-School Children's Series	Adrianna DI Liello, Addison Holley Amazon Studios (tied)	Nominated
2017	Parent's Choice	Parents' Choice Silver Honour	Annedroids	Won
2018	Daytime Emmy Awards	Outstanding Children's or Family Viewing Series	J.J. Johnson, Blair Powers, Christin Simms, Matthew J.R. Bishop, Sinking Ship Entertainment	Nominated
2018	Daytime Emmy Awards	Outstanding Interactive Media Enhancement to a Daytime Program or Series	J.J. Johnson, Blair Powers, Alex Gordon, Deanna Ip, Gavin Friesen, Mark Cautillo, Jermaine Williams, Kevin Gan, Christopher Coey, Ronald Ruslim, Rachel Cravit, Leonidas Kouvaris, Nathan Langdon, Adriano Bertuzzo, Sean Hamilton, Geordie Telfer, Sinking Ship Entertainment	Nominated
2018	Daytime Emmy Awards	Outstanding Lighting Direction	George Lajtai C.S.C., Stepan Sivko, Sinking Ship Entertainment	Nominated
2018	Daytime Emmy Awards	Outstanding Sound Mixing	David Guerra, Sean Karp, Will Preventis, Noah Siegal, Sinking Ship Entertainment	Nominated
2018	Daytime Emmy Awards	Outstanding Sound Editing – Live Action	Sean Karp, Will Preventis, Noah Siegal, Blag Ahilov, Charles Duchesne, Jakob Thiesen, Sinking Ship Entertainment	Nominated
2018	Parent's Choice	Parent's Choice Silver Honour	Annedroids	Won
2019	Kidscreen Awards	Best Learning App - Branded	Annedroids	Won
