= Adrianna Di Liello =

Canadian actress

- Born: April 28, 2002 (age 24); London, Ontario, Canada
- Occupation: Actress
- Years active: 2013–present

Adrianna Di Liello is a Canadian actress. She is best known for playing Shania in the CGI/live action series Annedroids and Jenna Cristinziano in the drama series Backstage.

== Early life ==
Di Liello was born in London, Ontario in 2002 to Maria Luisa Contursi and Vince Di Liello. She attended the Lester B. Pearson School for the Arts. She was a student at the Jo Read School of Dance. She and her older sister Isabella attended H. B. Beal Secondary School

== Career ==
Her first big role came playing Shania in the CGI/live action TV series Annedroids. She won the 2015 Young Artist Award for Outstanding Young Ensemble in a TV Series. She also nominated for an Emmy Award for Outstanding Performer in a Children's, Pre-School Children's or Family Viewing Program. Her first roles were in the short films Children Film Centre and Lunchbox Loser. Her first big film role came playing Lithpy in the musical comedy Stage Fright starring Meat Loaf and Minnie Driver. She played a recurring role in the drama series Backstage where she plays Jenna Cristinziano

== Filmography ==
=== Film ===
Year	Title	Role	Notes
2013	Children Film Centre	The Art Director	Short
2013	Lunchbox Loser	Hall Monitor	Short
2014	Stage Fright	Missy Diliello	
2016	A Nutcracker Christmas	Olivia	
2021	Love in Translation	Gretchen	
2023	Backspot	Banigan	
2024	Dying in Plain Sight	Emmy Harrison	
2024	Ice Cream Shop Girls	Bella	Short
2024	Rainbow World:The Movie	Kira, Daisy Madison	

=== Television ===
Year	Title	Role	Notes
2016	Super Why!	Princess Mud	Episode; The Princess Who Loved Mud
2014-2017	Annedroids	Shania	52 episodes
2017	Saving Hope	Iris Salt	Episode; We Need to Talk About Charlie Harris
2017	Dark Matter	Madison	Episode; Isn't That a Paradox
2016-2017	Backstage	Jenna Cristinziano	60 episodes
2019	Charlie's Colorforms City	Star	3 episodes
2018-2020	Bajillionaires	Chelsea Graham	21 episodes
2025	Doc	Ava	Episode; Delusions of Grandeur
