= Romy Weltman =

Canadian actress

- Born: 1999 or 2000 (age 25–26); Toronto, Canada
- Occupation: Actress
- Years active: 2012–present

Romy Weltman is a Canadian actress. She is best known for playing Kit Dunn in the drama series Backstage and Martha "Em" Cypress in the supernatural horror series Revival.

== Early life ==
Weltman was born in Toronto. She is a graduate of Westmount Collegiate Institute in Thornhill, Ontario.

== Career ==
Early on in her career she played Elena in The Plot to Kill My Mother and Pet in the horror film Terror Train and its sequel Terror Train. Her first big role came playing Kit Dunn in the drama series Backstage. She had a recurring role as Lexi on the comey series The Pradeeps of Pittsburgh. She played Martha "Em" Cypress, one of the lead characters in the supernatural horror series Revival.

== Filmography ==
=== Film ===
Year	Title	Role	Notes
2012	Sun	Krista	Short
2012	Issues	Girl	Short
2013	The Returned	Young Kate	
2015	Strike!	Kathleen	Short
2016	The Red Maple Leaf	Jennifer Adams	
2020	Alone Together	Katie	Short
2020	I Do Or Die	Ella	
2022	Terror Train	Pet	
2022	Terror Train 2	Pet	
2024	The Plot to Murder My Mother	Ella	
2025	Out of Touch	Maddie	Short
2026	The Human Fold	Evelyn	

=== Television ===
Year	Title	Role	Notes
2013	Defiance	Young Rynn	Episode; The Devil in the Dark
2015	Saving Hope	Frances	Episode; Trading Places
2017	Shadowhunters	Teen Isabelle	Episode; Parabatai Lost
2016–17	Backstage	Kit Dunn	60 episodes
2018	Creeped Out	Esme Curtis	Episode; Kindlesticks
2019	Murdoch Mysteries	Isabel Carmichael	2 episodes
2019	Slasher	Erica Dickson	2 episodes
2020	Mrs. America	Young Female Delegate	Episode; Shirley
2021	Ginny & Georgia	Kate	Episode; Boo, Bitch
2024	The Pradeeps of Pittsburgh	Lexi	5 episodes
2025	Revival	Martha "Em" Cypress	10 episodes
2025	Too Opinionated	Herself	Episode; Too Opinionated Interview: Romy Weltman
