= The Holiday Shift =

2023 television series on Roku Channel

- Genre: Romantic comedy
- Created by: Tommy Johnagin
- Directed by: Paul Fox
- Starring: Varun Saranga; Jean-Luc Bilodeau; Devyn Nekoda; Nadine Bhabha; Brielle Robillard; Michael Delleva; Sarah Levy; Jon Dore
- Country of origin: United States
- Original language: English
- No. of seasons: 1
- No. of episodes: 5

Production
- Executive producers: Jackie Filgo; Jeff Filgo; Tommy Johnagin; Joe Hardesty; Paul Fox; Leo Pearlman; Ben Winston; Jeff Grosvenor
- Production companies: CBS Studios; Fulwell 73

Original release
- Network: Roku Channel
- Release: November 17, 2023

The Holiday Shift is a 2023 American romantic comedy television series broadcast on The Roku Channel. Produced by CBS Studios and Fulwell 73, the series premiered on November 17, 2023.

== Premise ==
The Holiday Shift is a comedy series set in a mall during the holiday season. It follows the intersecting love stories of several employees dealing with holiday shoppers, personal relationships, and workplace challenges.

== Cast and characters ==
=== Main ===
- Varun Saranga as Sam
- Jean-Luc Bilodeau as Ronnie
- Devyn Nekoda as Tess
- Nadine Bhabha as Marissa
- Brielle Robillard as Summer
- Michael Delleva as Deonte
- Sarah Levy as Susan
- Jon Dore as Brian
- Adam Fox as Austin

== Production ==
The series was created by Tommy Johnagin. Paul Fox directed all episodes, with Johnagin serving as the sole writer. Filming took place entirely at the Portage Place Mall in downtown Winnipeg, Manitoba, Canada.

== Episodes ==
No.	Title	Directed by	Written by	Original release date
1	"The One"	Paul Fox	Tommy Johnagin	November 17, 2023
It's Black Friday at Love Town Center Mall, and Sam sees his secret crush, Tess, is back in town. The group debates Sam's next steps, while a Mystery Giver fills the mall's toy bins with gifts.
2	"Love at First Sight"	Paul Fox	Tommy Johnagin	November 17, 2023
Tess feels jealous on a double date, Deonte experiences love at first sight, and the Mystery Giver strikes again. Marissa and Ronnie find common ground, while Brian conceals his troubles.
3	"The Lean In"	Paul Fox	Tommy Johnagin	November 17, 2023
Tess is torn between Sam and Trevor, seeking advice from Henry. Summer avoids her past, while Deonte obsesses over his crush. Ronnie and Marissa's friendship evolves, and the Mystery Giver brings cheer.
4	"Long Distance"	Paul Fox	Tommy Johnagin	November 17, 2023
Trevor asks Sam for ring advice, leading to complications with Tess. Ronnie realizes his feelings for Marissa, Deonte fears losing his love, and Summer reconciles with her sister. The Mystery Giver's identity is revealed.
5	"The Finale"	Paul Fox	Tommy Johnagin	November 17, 2023
Tess rethinks her relationship with Trevor, realizing Sam's move to New York. Ronnie expresses his feelings to Marissa through an epic gesture, and the friends celebrate Christmas Eve eve. The true Mystery Giver is unveiled.
