= Revival (TV series) =

2025 supernatural television series

- Promotional poster
- Genre: Drama; Horror noir; Mystery; Supernatural
- Created by: Aaron B. Koontz; Luke Boyce
- Based on: Revival by: Tim Seeley; Mike Norton
- Starring: Melanie Scrofano; Romy Weltman; David James Elliott; Andy McQueen
- Music by: Lydia Ainsworth; Alex Cuervo
- Countries of origin: Canada; United States
- Original language: English
- No. of seasons: 1
- No. of episodes: 10

Production
- Executive producers: Amanda Row; Melanie Scrofano; Stephen Foster; Greg Hemmings; Daniel March; Daniel Iron; Neil Tabatznik; Samantha Levine; Lance Samuels; Luke Boyce; Aaron B. Koontz
- Producers: Evan Ottoni; Szonja Jakovits; Ryan Plachcinski
- Editors: Mark Hussey; Curt Lobb
- Running time: 42–47 minutes
- Production companies: Paper Street Pictures; Luke's Lens; Hemmings Films; Blue Ice Pictures; Dynamic Television

Original release
- Network: Syfy (United States); CTV Sci-Fi Channel (Canada)
- Release: June 12 – August 14, 2025

Revival is a supernatural horror noir television series based on the American comic book series of the same name by Tim Seeley and Mike Norton, and published by Image Comics. Created by Aaron B. Koontz and Luke Boyce, the series premiered on June 12, 2025, on Syfy in the United States and CTV Sci-Fi Channel in Canada. In October 2026, the series was canceled after one season.

== Premise ==
In the rural town of Wausau, Wisconsin, the sudden resurrection of the recently deceased becomes known as Revival Day. Labelled "Revivers", the newly resurrected maintain their appearance, memories, and personalities from their previous lives but have gained regenerative healing abilities. While the town's residents grapple with the miraculous event, police officer Dana Cypress investigates a murder mystery in which everyone, including both the living and the newly revived, is a suspect. Meanwhile, Dana's sister Martha "Em" Cypress adjusts to her new life as a Reviver and seeks to learn the truth of Revival Day's origins.

== Cast and characters ==
=== Main ===
- Melanie Scrofano as Deputy Dana Cypress
- Romy Weltman as Martha "Em" Cypress
- David James Elliott as Sheriff Wayne Cypress
- Andy McQueen as Dr. Ibrahim Ramin

=== Recurring ===
- Hudson Wurster as Cooper Cypress
- Gianpaolo Venuta as Professor Aaron Weimer
- Maia Jae as Kay Mathurin
- Mark Little as Deputy Brent Gunderson
- Glen Gould as Deputy J.P. Brissett
- Nathan Dales as Deputy McCray
- Aryelle Morrison as Deputy Rogers
- Lenore Zann as Jeannie Gorski
- Katharine King So as May Tao
- Graeme Barrett as Randy Decker
- Nicky Guadagni as Arlene Stankiewicz
- Conrad Coates as Mayor Ken Dillisch
- Peter Millard as Lester Majack
- Brandon Oakes as Jesse Blackdeer
- Josh Cruddas as Myles Miller
- Paige Evans as Dr. Carla Morel
- Flora McInroy as Jordan Borshardt
- Kaleb Horn as Rhodey Rasch
- Gia Sandhu as Nithiya Weimer
- Steven Ogg as Blaine Abel
- Luca Villacis as Tyler Barrow
- Phil Brooks as Anthony "Tony" Check
- Lara Jean Chorostecki as Patricia "Patty" Cypress
- Konima Parkinson-Jones as General Louise Cale

== Episodes ==
No.	Title	Directed by	Written by	Original release date
1	"Don't Tell Dad"	Amanda Row	Aaron B. Koontz, Luke Boyce and Michael Moreci	June 12, 2025
In the town of Wausau, Wisconsin, everyone who had died within a two-week period suddenly resurrects without explanation. Weeks later, Wausau is under quarantine, and all known "Revivers" are placed on a registry. Deputy Dana Cypress works with her father, Sheriff Wayne Cypress, to keep the peace amid growing concerns from the local mayor, Ken Dillisch. Dana investigates the corpse of a horse that had been violently killed, and later theorizes with lead CDC scientist Dr. Ibrahim Ramin that a Reviver is the likely culprit. She then questions a Reviver criminal, Myles Miller, who informs her of a suspicious truck seen in the area. Meanwhile, Dana's reclusive younger sister, Martha "Em" Cypress, confronts her college professor and lover, Aaron Weimer, about their strained relationship, but he remains dismissive. Wayne takes his grandson Cooper Cypress with him while conducting a wellness check, but Cooper goes missing. Dana finds Em sleeping in the street and takes her to a local farm to track down the owner of the truck. They discover a deranged, unregistered Reviver, Arlene Stankiewicz, who kills her daughter before stabbing Em. After Em's wound quickly heals, she kills Arlene and reveals to her sister that she is a Reviver.
2	"Keeping Up Appearances"	Amanda Row	Aaron B. Koontz & Luke Boyce	June 19, 2025
In a flashback, Em resurrects on Revival Day by a waterfall, but is unaware of how she got there. She returns to her college dorm to learn that drugs no longer affect her and that any new wounds quickly heal. In the present, Dana agrees to keep Em's status as a Reviver a secret. Cooper is drawn into the woods by strange noises and meets the mysterious Blaine Abel, who directs him back to Wayne. The Cypress family later reunites at the local hospital, where Ibrahim prepares to perform an autopsy on Arlene, but she heals and kills several people before escaping. Fearful of more Revivers becoming violent, Wayne demands that Dillisch have all Revivers incarcerated, but he refuses. Dana questions Em after finding a stash of drugs in her dorm, and believes that she may have intentionally overdosed. Em later steals Dana's car to question Aaron at a local bar, who also believes that Em may have committed suicide. Em deliberately starts a fight to vent her frustrations, and is rescued by another Reviver, punk musician Rhodey Rasch. Dana confronts Em's roommate, Kay Mathurin, about the stash of drugs, and she confesses that she knows who likely killed Em.
3	"Reality Check"	Amanda Row	Noelle Carbone	June 26, 2025
Kay recounts how Em stole the stash of drugs from the Check brothers, who run an illegal smuggling ring. Cooper defends his Reviver classmate Jordan Borchardt from bullies, and Dana learns that Jordan's parents have disowned her. Wayne and Ibrahim investigate where Arlene was kept and discover that her son-in-law was poisoning her. Arlene later interrupts her daughter's funeral to kill her son-in-law before Blaine sets her alight and is arrested by Wayne. The local governor then berates Wayne and Dillisch about their failure to stop Arlene. Despite Ibrahim's hypothesis that Revivers are not inherently violent, the governor demands that all Revivers be monitored. Rhodey believes Em that she did not commit suicide, as she would have retained her pre-resurrection injuries. He brings Em to a concert, where Adam and Andrew Check confront her, but Dana intervenes and arrests Adam. Dana strikes a deal with Anthony "Tony" Check to free his brother, and Tony confirms he was not involved with Em's death due to being stuck outside the quarantine zone. After fleeing the concert, Em and Rhodey kiss, and Em recalls seeing Blaine on Revival Day. Wayne reluctantly sets Blaine free, who is greeted by a crowd of cheering locals.
4	"Run Along Little Lamb"	Amanda Row	Ashley Park	July 3, 2025
A disfigured Reviver breaks into Aaron's house to steal a flash drive and delivers it to investigative journalist May Tao. Dana and Em confront Blaine, who admits to having seen Em on Revival Day after retrieving an abandoned car. The police start marking the homes and stamping the IDs of all registered Revivers. While camping together, Cooper and Jordan witness a glowing creature outside their tent. Dana follows a trail of clues and discovers that Aaron had rented the abandoned car under a false alias. Em is forced to take anger management counseling with the psychologist Nithiya Weimer, Aaron's wife. Em later recalls that her likely killer was wearing the same wedding ring that she threw up after resurrecting, and learns from a pawnshop owner that the ring belonged to Aaron. When his office is ransacked, Aaron becomes paranoid and threatens to expose his aggressor over the phone before requesting that Dana meet him so he can confess. Em reaches Aaron first, and he admits to kidnapping but not killing her before he is shot dead by a masked man. Dana arrives moments later and is also shot. Em retaliates by shooting the man in the arm, who quickly flees.
5	"Triage"	Amanda Row	Heather Taylor	July 10, 2025
Ibrahim rushes Dana to the hospital, where she undergoes emergency surgery. Deputy Brent Gunderson then interrogates Ibrahim, but he hides that Em was present at the shooting. Due to a lack of evidence, Dana becomes the prime suspect regarding Aaron's death. To prove Dana's innocence, Em has Kay recover the bullet that passed through Dana and into Em. She then sneaks into the morgue and coats it in blood from Aaron's corpse before planting it at the crime scene. After Wayne refuses to conceal that Dillisch's wife is a Reviver, he threatens to have Wayne removed from office. Ibrahim's colleague, Dr. Carla Morel, begins inhumane testing on Myles, impresses the governor with her findings, and replaces Ibrahim as lead scientist. Blaine leads a religious militia to taunt Revivers around town and starts branding his followers, including the impressionable Tyler Barrow. Local celebrity Lester Majak informs Wayne that he witnessed the aftermath of the shooting, leading Wayne to believe that another police officer was the likely culprit. Wayne has Gunderson test the bullet that Em planted and finds that it belonged to Deputy McCray's gun. After arresting McCray, Gunderson also discovers that his car was full of dismembered Reviver body parts.
6	"Bloodlines"	Samir Rehem	Aaron B. Koontz & Luke Boyce	July 17, 2025
In a flashback, Patricia Cypress gives birth to Em, but she is born with brittle bone disease, which leads to a sheltered upbringing. In the present, May visits Dana at the hospital and reveals that she is investigating the mismanaged Blackdeer case that Dana worked on two years prior. Tony is smuggled into Wausau by his brothers to help expand their illicit smuggling operations despite McCray's arrest. The brothers then break into Dana's home, kidnapping Em, Cooper, and Jordan, intending to sell Em's body parts to their boss's clientele. Tony attempts to blackmail Dana to replace McCray and help smuggle Reviver body parts across the town border, but she vehemently refuses. Dana then goes to rescue her family, but learns that Gunderson was the masked shooter after noticing his injured arm, and kills him in self-defence. Em escapes captivity and assaults the Check brothers' warehouse, killing Adam and Andrew with enhanced Reviver strength. Ibrahim rescues Jordan, but she becomes compelled to approach a glowing creature outside the warehouse and touches it, which allows her to die. Despite Dana's weakened state, she finds Cooper, but Tony stabs her multiple times. Em then viciously kills Tony before comforting her critically wounded sister.
7	"Too Many Secrets"	Samir Rehem	Noelle Carbone	July 24, 2025
Em miraculously heals Dana's wounds but passes out from exhaustion. They quickly flee the warehouse, with Ibrahim taking Em with him to recover. Wayne receives footage of Em killing the Check brothers and learns of her Reviver status. He confronts Dana, but they are interrupted by a paranoid Dillisch, who plans to skip town with his wife. General Louise Cale arrives to stop them and informs Wayne that, following the warehouse attack, Wausau has been placed under martial law and that every Reviver will be incarcerated in a detention facility. Dillisch informs Cale about the warehouse footage, and a manhunt for Em begins. Despite his reservations, Wayne agrees to work with Dana to find Em's killer. Blaine and his militia kidnap a Reviver to give to a captive glowing creature, or "angel", and discover that touching a creature allows a Reviver to die. Ibrahim and a weakened Em avoid Cale's soldiers and go to Moore Creek, where Em was killed, who fully recovers when submerged underwater. After agreeing to work together, May takes Dana to visit the disfigured Reviver, Jesse Blackdeer, who informs them that Gunderson killed him on Revival Day, and that whoever hired Gunderson had Em killed too.
8	"A Rose and a Thorn"	Samir Rehem	Aaron B. Koontz & Luke Boyce & Ashley Park	July 31, 2025
In a series of flashbacks, Rose Blackdeer, Jesse's daughter, makes plans to leave Wausau with her girlfriend May. Days later, Jesse reports that Rose is missing. Dana and Gunderson search Jesse's home and find that Rose had frequently written letters to Blaine, despite the historic rivalry between their families. While Dana believes that Jesse was innocent, Wayne searches Jesse's home again and arrests him after finding Rose's burnt clothing. Jesse then attempts to escape, and Dana lets him go. Two years later, May is investigating Gunderson for planting the evidence that incriminated Jesse. On Revival Day, Jesse returns to confront Gunderson but is killed. May later watches Jesse's expedited cremation, but he resurrects as a Reviver. In the present, May reveals she found evidence that Rose was killed at Moore Creek and that the flash drive recovered by Jesse referenced a Cutlass Supreme owned by Blaine. Jesse goes to kill Blaine but finds his "angel", which leads Jesse to the Cutlass, where he finds Rose's corpse. A flashback reveals that Aaron used the Cutlass to kidnap Rose. After burying his daughter, Jesse willingly touches the "angel" and dies. Meanwhile, Em secretly meets with Rhodey, but is ambushed by Cale's soldiers.
9	"Mother of Babylon"	Samir Rehem	Noelle Carbone	August 7, 2025
Having found Ibrahim at Moore Creek, Blaine questions him about Revival Day's origins, but is interrupted by Dana's arrival. Blaine is arrested and interrogated about Rose and Em's deaths, but denies any involvement, claiming to have been Rose's friend. May discovers that Blaine could not have hired Aaron or Gunderson after he donated his family's fortune to charity. Em is imprisoned at the detention facility and hallucinates her deceased mother, Patricia. Em later rebuffs Rhodey when he admits that Cale forced him to help capture her and confides in Nithiya about her guilt regarding Patricia's death. For their cooperation, Dillisch and his wife receive special treatment from Cale, and they learn that she plans to transport the Revivers out of town. Ibrahim gives Carla water from Moore Creek to be injected into every Reviver, which helps them recover their strength and escape the facility, while a disguised Tyler frees Em. After hearing Blaine recount his experience on Revival Day, Ibrahim theorizes that Em's death at Moore Creek caused Revival Day to occur, but Blaine takes him hostage. Lester later calls Wayne to inform him that Blaine's militia has taken over the local church, with Em and Ibrahim held captive inside.
10	"Rend the Veil"	Samir Rehem	Aaron B. Koontz & Luke Boyce	August 14, 2025
Blaine publicly broadcasts his plan to purge Wausau of Revivers. Ibrahim casts doubts on his crusade, believing that the "angels" are Revivers' lost souls. Dana and Wayne reach the church, but are captured alongside Lester. After Dana claims that Em can heal people, Blaine shoots Wayne, and Em heals him. Cale's soldiers then assault the church, allowing the hostages to escape. Lester brings Em to an old water mill and confesses that he and Aaron killed Rose as part of a ritual sacrifice to activate Moore Creek's healing properties to extend their lifespans and cure Nithiya's cancer. Lester hired Gunderson to cover up loose ends, including killing Aaron after he betrayed Lester and sacrificed Em, causing Revival Day when the ritual backfired. Lester has Em reunite with her captive soul, and attempts to complete the ritual as Dana arrives, but Em rips out his heart and dies in Dana's arms. One month later, Revivers were more accepted in Wausau, Wayne resigns as sheriff, and Ibrahim continues studying Moore Creek. Dana learns that Em had frequently corresponded with Nithiya online, who set up Em's kidnapping on Revival Day. Meanwhile, Nithiya has moved to an isolated cabin, where Em is still alive.

== Production ==
=== Development ===
During May 2024, Syfy announced at the annual NBCUniversal upfront presentation that they had given a series order to Revival along with a 2025 release window. Also during May 2025, Bell Media announced that the ten-episode series would release on CTV Sci-Fi Channel.

On October 20, 2026, the series was canceled after one season.

=== Casting ===
In September 2024, Melanie Scrofano, Romy Weltman, David James Elliott, and Andy McQueen were announced as the main cast of the series. Later that month, Steven Ogg joined the cast in a recurring role with Phil Brooks joining in November. In December 2024, Gia Sandhu, Katharine King So, Maia Jae, Nathan Dales, Mark Little, Glen Gould, Lara Jean Chorostecki, and Conrad Coates joined the cast in supporting roles. In February 2025, the full ensemble cast for the series was confirmed.

=== Filming ===
In September 2024, principal photography began in southeastern New Brunswick, Canada, including the areas of Saint John, Sussex, and Norton. Other filming locations included Grand Bay-Westfield and Hampton, with the project employing over 600 full and part-time workers from the province. Filming was scheduled to last until December 2024 and officially concluded on December 7.

== Release ==
Revival premiered on June 12, 2025, on Syfy in the United States and CTV Sci-Fi Channel in Canada with each episode made available to stream on Peacock and Crave one week after they aired.

Dynamic Television distributes the series internationally, with Sky UK acquiring the series for the United Kingdom and Ireland; Universal Networks for France, Spain, Portugal, Poland, and the Balkans; Cosmote TV for Greece; Tivibu for Turkey; and Foxtel for Australia. The series premiered on Sky Max in the United Kingdom on October 12, 2025. The series was released on Netflix on August 24, 2026.

== Reception ==
On the review aggregator website Rotten Tomatoes, the series holds an approval rating of 90% based on 21 critic reviews, with an average rating of 6.8/10. The website's critical consensus reads, "Revival capitalizes on its crackerjack concept with an entertaining tonal variety, bolstered by Melanie Scrofano's captivating lead performance." Metacritic gave the series a weighted average score of 71 based on 8 critic reviews, indicating "generally favourable reviews".

The first episode aired on Syfy in the United States and was simulcast on USA Network with a combined 238,000 viewers. The eighth episode aired on Syfy with 106,000 viewers and the ninth episode aired with 94,000 viewers. While the cable viewership was considered lackluster, the series reportedly performed better on streaming services, with it becoming the #1 most watched series on Peacock during the week that the series premiered.
