= List of Annedroids episodes =

Annedroids is a Canadian CGI/live action children's television series created by J. J. Johnson. In association with broadcasters TVOntario, SRC and KiKa, Sinking Ship Entertainment produces the series. It was released on Amazon Video on July 25, 2014 in the UK and U.S., and premiered on August 25 on TVOKids in Ontario, Canada. The show's aim is to educate children about science, technology, engineering and math (STEM) from the perspectives of an 11-year-old girl, her friends, and her three android creations.

== Series overview ==
Season	Episodes	Originally released	
Season	Episodes	First released	Last released
1	13	July 25, 2014	October 30, 2014
2	13	July 2, 2015	July 5, 2015
3	13	June 24, 2016	June 24, 2016
4	13	March 3, 2017	March 3, 2017

== Episode list ==
=== Season 1 (2014) ===
No. overall	No. in season	Title	Subjects	Directed by	Written by	Original release date
1	1	"New Pals" "My New P.A.L."	Power sources	J. J. Johnson	J. J. Johnson	July 25, 2014; August 11, 2018
2	2	"PAL n' Go Seek"	Animals escape technics	J. J. Johnson	Story by : J. J. Johnson & Christin Simms; Teleplay by : J. J. Johnson	July 25, 2014; August 11, 2018
3	3	"Reduce, Reuse, Robocycle"	Contraption design	J. J. Johnson	Story by : J. J. Johnson & Christin Simms; Teleplay by : Christin Simms	July 25, 2014; August 11, 2018
4	4	"Helping Hand"	Chemical reactions	J. J. Johnson	Story by : J. J. Johnson & Christin Simms; Teleplay by : Doug Hadders & Adam Rotstein	July 25, 2014; August 11, 2018
5	5	"Garbage Band"	Security system	J. J. Johnson	Story by : J. J. Johnson & Christin Simms; Teleplay by : J. J. Johnson	July 25, 2014; August 11, 2018
6	6	"Eyes Up"	Helium properties	Jeremy Lutter	Story by : J. J. Johnson & Christin Simms; Teleplay by : Christin Simms	July 25, 2014; August 11, 2018
7	7	"Junkyard Sleepover"	Astronomy	J. J. Johnson	Story by : J. J. Johnson & Christin Simms; Teleplay by : J. J. Johnson	July 25, 2014; August 18, 2018
8	8	"Pal in the Middle"	Optics (colors, light and prism)	Kelly Harms	Story by : J. J. Johnson & Christin Simms; Teleplay by : Richard Elliott & Simon Racioppa	October 30, 2014 (Note: This episode first premiered on October 22, 2014 on TVOKids.); August 18, 2018
9	9	"Android's Best Friend"	Plants	J. J. Johnson	Story by : J. J. Johnson & Christin Simms; Teleplay by : J. J. Johnson	October 30, 2014 (Note: This episode first premiered on October 29, 2014 on TVOKids.); August 18, 2018
10	10	"The Power of Love"	Electricity production	J. J. Johnson	Story by : J. J. Johnson & Christin Simms; Teleplay by : Suzanne Bolch & John May	October 30, 2014; August 18, 2018
11	11	"Electromagnetic Pal"	Magnets	J. J. Johnson	Christin Simms	October 30, 2014; August 18, 2018
12	12	"Out of Hand"	Radio waves	John May	Story by : J. J. Johnson & Christin Simms; Teleplay by : Christin Simms	October 30, 2014; August 18, 2018
13	13	"Eyes on the Skies"	Mineralogy	J. J. Johnson	Story by : J. J. Johnson & Christin Simms; Teleplay by : Laura Kosterski	October 30, 2014; August 25, 2018

=== Season 2 (2015) ===
No. overall	No. in season	Title	Subjects	Directed by	Written by	Original release date
14	1	"Message in a Rocket"	Means of flight	Kelly Harms	Story by : J. J. Johnson & Christin Simms; Teleplay by : J. J. Johnson	July 5, 2015; August 25, 2018
15	2	"Undercover Pigeon"	Pigeons and Chemistry	J. J. Johnson	Story by : J. J. Johnson & Christin Simms; Teleplay by : J. J. Johnson	July 5, 2015; August 25, 2018
16	3	"Experiments in Babysitting"	Animal babies care	Steve Scaini	Story by : J. J. Johnson & Christin Simms; Teleplay by : J. J. Johnson, Christin Simms, Amanda Spagnolo	July 5, 2015; August 25, 2018
17	4	"Parent Swap"	Air gliding	John May	Story by : J. J. Johnson & Christin Simms; Teleplay by : Christin Simms	July 5, 2015; August 25, 2018
18	5	"An Android Space Odyssey"	Leaving the atmosphere	Terrance Odette	Story by : J. J. Johnson & Christin Simms; Teleplay by : Mike Kiss	July 5, 2015; August 25, 2018
19	6	"Zack Bot"	Supplying system	J. J. Johnson	Story by : J. J. Johnson & Christin Simms; Teleplay by : J. J. Johnson	July 5, 2015; September 1, 2018
20	7	"Junkyard CSI"	Genetics	Steve Wright	John May & Suzanne Bloch	July 5, 2015; September 1, 2018
21	8	"Jurassic Junkyard"	Dinosaurs and dreams	J. J. Johnson	J. J. Johnson & Christin Simms	July 5, 2015; September 1, 2018
22	9	"Costume Pal"	Dry ice	Stefan Scaini	Story by : J. J. Johnson & Christin Simms; Teleplay by : Doug Hadders & Adam Rothstein	July 5, 2015; September 1, 2018
23	10	"Broken Hand"	Simple mechanisms	Craig David Wallace	Story by : J. J. Johnson & Christin Simms; Teleplay by : Jill Golick	July 5, 2015; September 1, 2018
24	11	"Lights! Camera! Volcano!"	Volcanoes and chemical reactions	Stefan Scaini	J. J. Johnson & Christin Simms	July 5, 2015; September 1, 2018
25	12	"Annebots"	Advanced robotics	Stefan Scaini	J. J. Johnson & Christin Simms	July 5, 2015
26	13	"Family Matter"	Matter states (water)	J. J. Johnson	J. J. Johnson & Christin Simms	July 5, 2015

=== Season 3 (2016) ===
No. overall	No. in season	Title	Subjects	Directed by	Written by	Original release date
27	1	"Reset"	Friendship experience	J. J. Johnson	J. J. Johnson & Christin Simms	June 24, 2016
28	2	"I, Android"	Following actions	J. J. Johnson	J. J. Johnson & Christin Simms	June 24, 2016
29	3	"Paling Around"	Strength	J. J. Johnson	J. J. Johnson & Christin Simms	June 24, 2016
30	4	"The Escape Artist"	Advanced Technology	John May	Amanda Spagnolo	June 24, 2016
31	5	"For Art's Sake"	Lying and camouflaging	Jeremy Lutter	Jeff Detsky	June 24, 2016
32	6	"Teacher's Pal"	Fuel sources	J. J. Johnson	Amy Cole	June 24, 2016
33	7	"Haunted Junkyard"	Fight-or-flight response	John May	Ben Joseph	June 24, 2016
34	8	"Robo Mutt"	Animal guard techniques	Craig David Wallace	John May & Suzanne Bolch	June 24, 2016
35	9	"Broken Parts"	Car parts	Craig David Wallace	Amy Cole	June 24, 2016
36	10	"Bugged Out"	Entomology and micro-technology	Michael Kennedy	Ben Joseph	June 24, 2016
37	11	"Map Quest"	Navigation methods, constellations, and satellites	John May	J. J. Johnson & Christin Simms	June 24, 2016
38	12	"Bionic Grandma"	Bone joints and advanced robotics	Stefan Scaini	Shawn Kalb	June 24, 2016
39	13	"Friendiversary"	Hearts	Terrance Odette	Written by : J. J. Johnson, Christin Simms & Amanda Spagnolo; Teleplay by : Amanda Spagnolo	June 24, 2016

=== Season 4 (2017) ===
No. overall	No. in season	Title	Subjects	Directed by	Written by	Original release date
40	1	"Operation Pal"	Hypothesis	Michael Kennedy	J. J. Johnson & Christin Simms	March 3, 2017
41	2	"Dumpster Diving"	Reservoirs and swimming	John May	Amanda Spagnolo	March 3, 2017
42	3	"Enemy Lines"	Smoke screens and dealing with bullies	Vivieno Caldinelli	J. J. Johnson, Christin Simms & Amanda Spagnolo	March 3, 2017
43	4	"Flying the Cooper"	Tracking	Michael Kennedy	J. J. Johnson, Christin Simms & Amanda Spagnolo	March 3, 2017
44	5	"Palception"	Dreams	Michael Kennedy	J. J. Johnson, Christin Simms & Amanda Spagnolo	March 3, 2017
45	6	"Wilderness Tech – Part 1"	Fishing and canoeing	J. J. Johnson	J. J. Johnson & Christin Simms	March 3, 2017
46	7	"Wilderness Tech – Part 2"	Compasses and trails	J. J. Johnson	J. J. Johnson & Christin Simms	March 3, 2017
47	8	"Search Party"	Death theories	John May	J. J. Johnson, Christin Simms & Amanda Spagnolo	March 3, 2017
48	9	"Thermodad"	Energy sources	Warren P. Sonoda	J. J. Johnson, Christin Simms, James Gangl & Amanda Spagnolo	March 3, 2017
49	10	"Forces of Nurture"	Physics and forces	J. J. Johnson	J. J. Johnson & Christin Simms	March 3, 2017
50	11	"Growth Spurt"	Making ingredients	John May	Story by : J. J. Johnson & Christin Simms; Teleplay by : Amanda Spagnolo	March 3, 2017
51	12	"The Mother of Invention – Part 1"	Holograms and hair	J. J. Johnson	J. J. Johnson & Christin Simms	March 3, 2017
52	13	"The Mother of Invention – Part 2"	Importance of science	J. J. Johnson	J. J. Johnson & Christin Simms	March 3, 2017
