= Vicious (film) =

2025 film by Bryan Bertino

- Release poster
- Directed by: Bryan Bertino
- Written by: Bryan Bertino
- Produced by: Richard Suckle; Bryan Bertino; Caitlin Delaney
- Starring: Dakota Fanning; Kathryn Hunter; Mary McCormack; Rachel Blanchard
- Cinematography: Tristan Nyby
- Edited by: Tad Dennis
- Music by: Tom Schraeder
- Production company: Atlas Independent
- Distributed by: Paramount Pictures
- Release dates: September 19, 2025 (Fantastic Fest); October 10, 2025 (United States)
- Running time: 102 minutes
- Country: United States
- Language: English

Vicious is a 2025 American horror film written, produced and directed by Bryan Bertino. It stars Dakota Fanning, Kathryn Hunter, Mary McCormack, Rachel Blanchard, and Devyn Nekoda.

It had its world premiere at Fantastic Fest on September 19, 2025, before being released simultaneously on Paramount+ and on digital video on demand on October 10, 2025.

== Plot ==
Polly is a directionless woman in her 30s who is stuck in a dead-end job and fretting over starting at school again. She lives alone in a house she rents from her sister Lainie whose daughter, Aly, Polly dotes on. As Polly prepares for an important interview, she is visited by an elderly woman. The woman gifts her a small wooden box and hourglass and claims that Polly is going to die that night. Unnerved, Polly escorts the woman out of her house and throws away the box. A malevolent entity impersonating her mother tells Polly that she will die unless she gives the box, which has reappeared in her house, something she hates, something she needs and something she loves. Polly attempts to get help from her neighbor across the street, asking her to call the police. The entity possesses the neighbor, forcing the neighbor to stab herself to death in retaliation for Polly telling others of the box.

Polly uses a key she has vomited up after the box rejected her first sacrifice to unlock a closet filled with her deceased father's belongings. She retrieves a cross necklace and gives it to the box, having resented religion after losing her father to cancer, which it accepts. Lainie calls, claiming to have received several strange and threatening phone calls from Polly. Lainie ends the phone call claiming to see Polly outside despite her sister's warnings. Polly decides to cut off her pinky toe but the box is not satisfied. When Polly also cuts off her index finger and gives it to the box, it is satisfied.

The house door unlocks and Polly rushes to Lainie's house but discovers her sister and family all dead inside. Polly decides to cut off a lock of Aly's hair and give it to the box which it accepts. Polly's family reawakens and all seems well until a violent apparition of Aly attacks Polly and stabs her. Polly awakens with the hourglass still running. She realizes she needs to pass the box on and visits Lainie's neighbor Tara, forcing the box upon her. Returning home, Polly is attacked by the old woman who initially gave her the box. Polly manages to kill the woman, who muses about the evil nature of the box.

Polly emerges from her house to find the box is gone and her neighbor is still alive. Polly reunites with Lainie and Aly before going to check on Tara. Tara claims to not recognize Polly or know about the box, but it is revealed she has killed her parents as well as cut off several fingers to please it.

== Cast ==
- Dakota Fanning as Polly
- Kathryn Hunter as the woman
- Mary McCormack as mother
- Rachel Blanchard as Lainie
- Devyn Nekoda as Tara
- Klea Scott as neighbor woman
- Emily Mitchell as Aly

== Production ==
In February 2024, it was reported that a horror film written and directed by Bryan Bertino titled Vicious was in production by Atlas Entertainment, with Dakota Fanning in the lead role. Principal photography began in Ottawa, Ontario, on March 22, 2024, and concluded on May 10. In April, Kathryn Hunter, Mary McCormack, Rachel Blanchard, Devyn Nekoda, Klea Scott, and Emily Mitchell rounded out the cast.

== Release ==
Vicious was originally scheduled for a theatrical release on August 8, 2025, before being moved forward to February 28, 2025, and then being removed from Paramount's release schedule in December 2024.

In August 2025, it was announced that the theatrical release was cancelled and was instead released on Paramount+ and digital formats on October 10, 2025. The film had its world premiere at Fantastic Fest on September 19, 2025.

== Reception ==
On the review aggregator website Rotten Tomatoes, 43% of 42 critics' reviews are positive, with an average rating of 5.4/10. Metacritic, which uses a weighted average, assigned the film a score of 56 out of 100, based on 7 critics, indicating "mixed or average" reviews.
