= Backstage (Canadian TV series) =

- Genre: Drama; Performing arts
- Created by: Jennifer Pertsch; Lara Azzopardi
- Starring: Devyn Nekoda; Alyssa Trask; Josh Bogert; Aviva Mongillo; Matthew Isen; Julia Tomasone; Adrianna Di Liello; Colin Petierre; Mckenzie Small; Romy Weltman; Isiah Hall; Kyal Legend; Chris Hoffman; Jane Moffat; Thomas L. Colford
- Theme music composer: Andrew Austin
- Opening theme: "Spark" by Stefanie McCarol
- Country of origin: Canada
- Original language: English
- No. of seasons: 2
- No. of episodes: 60 (list of episodes)

Production
- Executive producers: Brian Irving; Jennifer Pertsch; Tom McGillis; George Elliott; Lara Azzopardi
- Producer: Brian Irving
- Camera setup: Single-camera
- Running time: 22–25 minutes
- Production company: Fresh TV

Original release
- Network: Family Channel
- Release: March 18, 2016 – September 30, 2017

Backstage is a Canadian drama television series about a performing arts high school created by Jennifer Pertsch and Lara Azzopardi. The series aired in Canada on Family Channel from March 18 to December 9, 2016, and in the United States on Disney Channel from March 25 to September 30, 2016. The series was also released on Netflix in early 2017, with season two premiering on the streaming service on September 30, 2017. The series' ensemble cast includes Devyn Nekoda, Alyssa Trask, Josh Bogert, Aviva Mongillo, Matthew Isen, and Julia Tomasone.

== Premise ==
The trials and tribulations of the students at Keaton School of the Arts, which includes dancers, singers, musicians, and artists. The characters frequently break the fourth wall, talking to the viewers in so-called "confessionals".

== Episodes ==
Season	Episodes	Originally released	
Season	Episodes	First released	Last released
1	30	March 18, 2016	September 30, 2016
2	30	July 28, 2017	September 30, 2017

== Cast ==
- Devyn Nekoda as Vanessa
- Alyssa Trask as Carly
- Josh Bogert as Miles
- Aviva Mongillo as Alya
- Matthew Isen as Jax
- Julia Tomasone as Bianca
- Adrianna Di Liello as Jenna
- Colin Petierre as Sasha
- Mckenzie Small as Scarlett
- Romy Weltman as Kit
- Isiah Hall as Denzel (season 1)
- Kyal Legend as Julie
- Chris Hoffman as Park
- Jane Moffat as Helsweel
- Thomas L. Colford as Beckett (season 2)

== Production ==
Actors in the series are all real dancers and musicians embodying the true spirit of the performing arts. Directors for the series include top music video directors such as RT!, Director X, Wendy Morgan, and Warren P. Sonoda as well as Mario Azzopardi and Lara Azzopardi. The first season production order consisted of 30 episodes.

On May 10, 2016, it was announced that Backstage was renewed for a 30-episode second season for a 2017 broadcast on Family Channel in Canada. On September 30, 2017, the show's cast revealed on social media that the entire second season had been picked up by Netflix.

== Broadcast ==
The series premiered on Family Channel in Canada on March 18, 2016, and on Disney Channel in the United States on March 25, 2016. Disney Channel secured the license for the series in several countries in Europe, Africa, and the Middle East. It premiered on Disney Channel in the United Kingdom and Ireland on May 9, 2016, and on Disney Channel in Australia and New Zealand on October 28, 2016.

The second season had its world premiere on July 28, 2017, in the UK and Ireland. The entire second season was released in Australia on the ABC Me app and on the ABC iview on-demand service from September 15 to October 15, 2017. In the United States, the second season was released on Netflix on September 30, 2017.

== Reception ==
=== Critical ===
Backstage has received positive, albeit lukewarm reviews from critics. Common Sense Media gave the series three out of five stars, saying that while it "doesn't really break new ground", it "does touch on many issues that are worthwhile for kids".

=== U.S. ratings ===
Viewership and ratings per season of Backstage
Season	Episodes	First aired		Last aired		Avg. viewers (millions)
Season	Episodes	Date	Viewers (millions)	Date	Viewers (millions)	Avg. viewers (millions)
1	30	March 25, 2016	1.23	September 30, 2016	0.90	0.95

== Music ==
- The primary source for performers and writers is the end credits of episodes.

=== Season 1 ===
"Songs from Backstage, Vol. 1"

Single by Backstage Cast
- Released: March 18, 2016
- Genre: Pop
- Length: 10:29
- Label: Cardinal Point
- Songwriter: Various

Songs from Backstage, Vol. 1
No.	Title	Writer(s)	Performer(s)	Length
1.	"Spark"	Andrew Austin	Stefanie McCarol	3:15
2.	"Heartbeats"	Emery Taylor	Aviva Mongillo	3:36
3.	"Heartbeats (Acoustic)"	Emery Taylor	Aviva Mongillo	3:37

"Songs from Backstage, Vol. 2"

Single by Backstage Cast
- Released: March 25, 2016
- Genre: Pop
- Length: 5:23
- Label: Cardinal Point
- Songwriter: Various

Songs from Backstage, Vol. 2
No.	Title	Writer(s)	Performer(s)	Length
1.	"I Don't Wanna Hear It"	Jeff Milutinovic	Kasey Brown	2:22
2.	"Who You Lookin'"	Dave Sorbara	Laura Nikolic	3:01

"Songs from Backstage, Vol. 3"

Single by Backstage Cast
- Released: April 8, 2016
- Genre: Pop
- Length: 5:56
- Label: Cardinal Point
- Songwriter: Various

Songs from Backstage, Vol. 3
No.	Title	Writer(s)	Performer(s)	Length
1.	"Going Home"	Rob Melamed	Maya Killtron	2:53
2.	"Elevator"	Andrew Austin; Jeff Milutinovic	Mckenzie Small	3:03

"Songs from Backstage, Vol. 4"

Single by Backstage Cast
- Released: April 22, 2016
- Genre: Pop
- Length: 5:21
- Label: Cardinal Point
- Songwriter: Various

Songs from Backstage, Vol. 4
No.	Title	Writer(s)	Performer(s)	Length
1.	"Dig Deep (Miles Version)"	Andrew Austin; Ryan McLarnon; Kate Hewlett	Josh Bogert; Aviva Mongillo	2:34
2.	"Lost in Contemplation"	Ryan McLarnon	Andrew Austin	2:47

"Songs from Backstage, Vol. 5"

Single by Backstage Cast
- Released: May 13, 2016
- Genre: Pop
- Length: 7:21
- Label: Cardinal Point
- Songwriter: Various

Songs from Backstage, Vol. 5
No.	Title	Writer(s)	Performer(s)	Length
1.	"Shot Me Down"	Emery Taylor	Aviva Mongillo	4:53
2.	"Gimme Some L"	TBA	TBA	2:28

"Songs from Backstage, Vol. 6"

Single by Backstage Cast
- Released: June 3, 2016
- Genre: Pop
- Length: 7:29
- Label: Cardinal Point
- Songwriter: Various

Songs from Backstage, Vol. 6
No.	Title	Writer(s)	Performer(s)	Length
1.	"Born at the Right Time"	Tom Westin	Kelly McCluskey	2:48
2.	"Eyes of the Camera"	Andrew Austin	Mckenzie Small	2:41
3.	"Eyes of the Camera (A Cappella)"	Andrew Austin	Mckenzie Small	2:00

"Songs from Backstage, Vol. 7"

Single by Backstage Cast
- Released: June 24, 2016
- Genre: Pop
- Length: 5:34
- Label: Cardinal Point
- Songwriter: Various

Songs from Backstage, Vol. 7
No.	Title	Writer(s)	Performer(s)	Length
1.	"Dig Deep (Alya Version)"	Andrew Austin; Ryan McLarnon; Kate Hewlett	Aviva Mongillo; Josh Bogert	2:37
2.	"Step, Sister!" (parts 1–5)	Kevin Krouglow; Igor Simoes Correia; Jeff Milutinovic; Rob Melamed	Kasey Brown	2:57

"Songs from Backstage, Vol. 8"

Single by Backstage Cast
- Released: September 16, 2016
- Genre: Pop
- Length: 9:03
- Label: Cardinal Point
- Songwriter: Various

Songs from Backstage, Vol. 8
No.	Title	Writer(s)	Performer(s)	Length
1.	"Until You Loved Me" ("Step, Sister!" part 7)	Andrew Austin	Andrew Austin	3:29
2.	"Music Gonna Make You Feel Alright"	Mark Domitric	Maya Kiltron	3:20
3.	"Move Over"	Igor Simoes Correia	TBA	2:14

"Songs from Backstage, Vol. 9"

Single by Backstage Cast
- Released: September 30, 2016
- Genre: Pop
- Length: 9:06
- Label: Cardinal Point
- Songwriter: Various

Songs from Backstage, Vol. 9
No.	Title	Writer(s)	Performer(s)	Length
1.	"Spin Yourself in Circles"	Rob Melamed	Rob Melamed	3:00
2.	"Beating of the Drum"	Ryan McLarnon	Aviva Mongillo	3:39
3.	"Phat Beat"	Igor Simoes Correia	Laura Nikolic; Samples	2:27

"Songs from Backstage, Vol. 10"

Single by Backstage Cast
- Released: October 14, 2016
- Genre: Pop
- Length: 6:56
- Label: Cardinal Point
- Songwriter: Various

Songs from Backstage, Vol. 10
No.	Title	Writer(s)	Performer(s)	Length
1.	"Watch Me Get It"	Mark Domitric; Rich Kidd	Rich Kidd	2:56
2.	"Cake"	Emery Taylor; Rob GF	Rob GF	4:00

Songs from Backstage, Vol. 11

EP by Backstage Cast
- Released: November 11, 2016
- Genre: Pop
- Length: 11:19
- Label: Cardinal Point

Songs from Backstage, Vol. 11
No.	Title	Writer(s)	Performer(s)	Length
1.	"The Fool"	Emery Taylor; Andrew Austin	Julia Tomasone; Aviva Mongillo; Capri Anderson; Emily Persich	2:51
2.	"Surfacing"	Kevin Krouglow	TBA	2:36
3.	"When the Light Shines"	Kevin Krouglow	Kevin Krouglow	3:14
4.	"Colour Me Happy"	Andrew Austin; Scott Oleszkowicz	Josh Bogert; Aviva Mongillo	2:38

"Songs from Backstage, Vol. 12"

Single by Backstage Cast
- Released: October 14, 2016
- Genre: Pop
- Length: 6:56
- Label: Cardinal Point
- Songwriter: Various

Songs from Backstage, Vol. 12
No.	Title	Writer(s)	Performer(s)	Length
1.	"Switch"	Andrew Austin	Mckenzie Small; Aviva Mongillo; Julia Tomasone	3:23
2.	"Letting You Go"	Igor Simoes Correia; Jeff Milutinovic	TBA	3:05
3.	"Fresh"	Emery Taylor	Roshin	3:10

=== Season 2 ===
Songs from Backstage Season 2, Vol. 1

Soundtrack album by Backstage Cast
- Released: March 16, 2018
- Genre: Pop
- Length: 47:29
- Label: Grayson Matthews

Songs from Backstage Season 2, Vol. 1
No.	Title	Writer(s)	Performer(s)	Length
1.	"Night Full of Stars"	Andrew Austin	Josh Bogert	2:35
2.	"Welcome Me Back"	Andrew Austin	Aviva Mongillo	2:24
3.	"On the Line"	Ryan McLarnon		1:39
4.	"Overdrive"	Rob Melamed		2:24
5.	"Bluebird"	Rob Melamed	Emily Persich	1:24
6.	"Outside the Box"	Jeff Milutinovic		1:29
7.	"Love Don't Fight Fair"	Andrew Austin	Andrew Austin	2:07
8.	"Rolling Stone"	Igor Simoes Correia	Andrew Austin	3:21
9.	"In the Bullring"	Jeff Milutinovic		2:24
10.	"Something Shiny"	Andrew Austin	Julia Tomasone	2:40
11.	"Peace"	Andrew Austin; Kate Hewlett	Julia Tomasone	1:46
12.	"Lost and Found"	Ryan Kondrat; John La Magna; Rob James	Rob James	2:22
13.	"No Picnic"	Andrew Austin	Josh Bogert	1:41
14.	"Only Me Now"	Ryan Kondrat; John La Magna; Adaline	Adaline	2:03
15.	"Those Eyes"	Ryan McLarnon; Andrew Austin	Aviva Mongillo; Mckenzie Small; Josh Bogert; Julia Tomasone	2:07
16.	"Wild"	Kevin Krouglow	S.Woo	2:52
17.	"Fall In"	Kevin Krouglow	Kevin Krouglow	4:31
18.	"You & I"	Ryan Kondrat; John La Magna; Rob James; Andrew Austin	Andrew Austin	1:51
19.	"Me and You"	Andrew Austin	Josh Bogert; Mckenzie Small	2:27
20.	"Are You Listening"	Andrew Austin	Mckenzie Small; Aviva Mongillo; Stephanie La Rochelle	3:22
