= Aviva Mongillo =

Canadian actress and singer (born 1998)

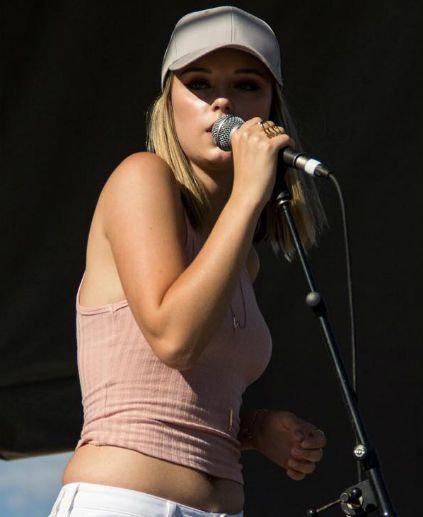
- Mongillo in 2019
- Born: Aviva Chiara Mongillo; February 6, 1998 (age 28); Markham, Ontario, Canada
- Education: Unionville High School
- Occupations: Actress; singer
- Years active: 2016–present
- Television: Backstage; Workin' Moms
- Height: 5 ft 5 in (1.65 m)
- Musical career
- Also known as: Carys
- Genre: Pop
- Instrument: Vocals
- Label: Warner Music Canada

Aviva Chiara Mongillo (born February 6, 1998), also known as Carys, is a Canadian singer and actress. She is known for her roles as Alya Kendrick in the Family Channel drama series Backstage and Juniper in the CBC sitcom Workin' Moms. After the online success of her song "Princesses Don't Cry", she released the EP To Anyone Like Me on October 2, 2020, through Warner Music Canada.

== Early life ==
Aviva Chiara Mongillo was born on February 6, 1998, in Markham, Canada. She was born into an Italian family, who she stated "always supported" her dreams. At the age of seven, she was enrolled in acting classes, followed by vocal lessons and guitar classes. She attended Unionville High School, and continued her education while appearing on Backstage. Mongillo has suffered from anxiety from a young age.

== Career ==
While attending Unionville High School, Mongillo posted a number of original songs to SoundCloud. They caught the attention of a music producer in Toronto, who invited her to a recording studio there. She worked with the songwriters, and a month into her time there, they informed her that the music was being made for Backstage. They told her that she should audition for a role on the series, and she was cast as Alya Kendrick. She portrayed the role for sixty episodes. In June 2016, Mongillo released her debut single, "Hype". The single was accompanied by a music video. On September 15, 2017, her debut EP, Songs About Boys, was released. The EP received promotion from Family Channel, Backstage's network. In 2017, she appeared in Don't Talk to Irene, a Canadian comedy film.

In 2018, Mongillo began portraying the recurring role of Juniper in the CBC sitcom Workin' Moms. In 2019, she appeared in the film Long Shot, playing a teenage version of Charlize Theron's character, as well as making an appearance in the slasher film Random Acts of Violence. Later in 2019, she began performing under the stage name Carys, with the single "Bad Boy" released on July 26, 2019. In August 2019, "Princesses Don't Cry", a song from the Songs About Boys EP, became a sleeper hit after going viral on social networking app TikTok. Over 850,000 videos were made using the song, which was later rereleased as a single under her stage name. She stated that when the song began to gain traction, she was perplexed since she wanted Carys to be a character that she could feel "removed from", and did not want to be seen as vulnerable. She then became grateful for the opportunity to become vulnerable with her music. The music video for "Princesses Don't Cry" was released on November 12, 2019.

In June 2020, "No More" was released as her next single, accompanied by a music video. On August 28, 2020, she released the single "Crush", and announced that her debut EP as Carys, To Anyone Like Me, would be released on October 2, 2020. Upon the release of To Anyone Like Me, the song "When a Girl" was released as a single, with an accompanying music video. In 2025, she began starring in the Netflix series Bet as Dori Ahlstrom.

== Filmography ==
Year	Title	Role	Notes
2016–2017	Backstage	Alya Kendrick	Main role
2017	Don't Talk to Irene	Sarah	Film
2018–2023	Workin' Moms	Juniper	Recurring role
2019	Long Shot	Young Charlotte	Film
2019	Random Acts of Violence	Hannah	Film
2020	Glass Houses	Carrie Dawson	Television film
2020	Retrograde	Emma	Short film
2022	1Up	Indigo	Film
2025–present	Bet	Dori Ahlstrom	Main role
TBA	The Land of Nod	TBA	Film

== Discography ==
=== Extended plays ===
Title	Details
Songs About Boys	Released: September 15, 2017; Label: Cardinal Point Music; Format: Digital download
To Anyone Like Me	Released: October 2, 2020; Label: Warner Music Canada; Format: Digital download, streaming
Waves	Released: May 3, 2024; Label: Independent; Format: Digital download, streaming
Drama Queen	Released: September 19, 2025; Label: Independent; Format: Digital download, streaming

=== Singles ===
Title	Year	Album
"Hype"	2016	Songs About Boys
"Bad Boy"	2019	Non-album singles
"Some of You"	2019	Non-album singles
"Princesses Don't Cry"	2019	To Anyone Like Me
"No More"	2020	To Anyone Like Me
"Crush"	2020	To Anyone Like Me
"When a Girl"	2020	To Anyone Like Me
"Psychic"	2022	Non-album singles
"Recovering People Pleaser"	2023	Non-album singles
"Aquarius"	2023	Non-album singles
"The End"	2023	Waves
"Heaven"	2023	Waves
"Ikyabwai"	2024	Waves
"Language"	2024	Waves
"Ring Pop" (with Featurette)	2024	Non-album singles
"Late Night Ice Cream"	2025	Non-album singles
"Garden"	2025	Non-album singles
"Dangelion Dreams"	2025	Drama Queen
"Love You From Afar"	2025	Drama Queen
