= Devyn Nekoda =

Canadian actress (born 2000)

- Born: December 12, 2000 (age 25); Brantford, Ontario, Canada
- Occupation: Actress
- Years active: 2014–present

Devyn Nekoda (born December 12, 2000) is a Canadian actress and dancer. She has appeared in numerous television series from a young age, and appeared in the 2023 slasher film Scream VI.

== Early life ==
Nekoda was brought up near Brantford, Ontario where she went to school. She studied dance, circus arts, gymnastics, and played soccer. She started dancing at age two in Simcoe, Ontario. She is of both Welsh/English and Japanese descent.

== Career ==
A child actress and dancer, she appeared in Utopia Falls and Backstage. She previously also had a role as Arlene in Canadian spin-off Degrassi: The Next Generation. In 2014, she had a guest role in the Canadian TV show The Next Step. She had a recurring role as Riley in the first series of the Netflix show Ginny & Georgia, and in 2022, appeared in the Disney musical comedy film Sneakerella, a 21st-century update on the Cinderella story.

In 2023, Nekoda appeared in Scream VI as Anika Kayoko, a student at Blackmore University and Mindy Meeks-Martin's girlfriend, as well as Tess in the American television romantic comedy The Holiday Shift on The Roku Channel.

In April 2024, she joined the cast of horror film Vicious.

== Filmography ==
Film roles
Year	Title	Role	Notes
2014	An American Girl: Isabelle Dances Into the Spotlight	Luisa	Direct-to-video film
2022	Sneakerella	Sami	Streaming film
2023	Scream VI	Anika Kayoko	
2024	Friday Night Sext Scandal	Brooklyn	Streaming film
2025	Vicious	Tara	
2027	Lice	TBA	Post-production

Television roles
Year	Title	Role	Notes
2014	Max & Shred	Wendy Chong	1 episode
2014	Degrassi: The Next Generation	Arlene	4 episodes
2014	The Next Step	Troupe Dancer	2 episodes
2015–2016	Annedroids	Charlie	Recurring role, 7 episodes
2016	The Swap	Mackenzie Wick	TV movie
2016–2017	Backstage	Vanessa	Main role
2016, 2019	Raising Expectations	Madison	2 episodes
2019	Northern Rescue	Allison	2 episodes
2019	Ghostwriter	Alice	1 episode
2020	Utopia Falls	Sage V	Main role
2020	Grand Army	Suki	1 episode
2021	Ginny & Georgia	Riley	Recurring role (season 1), 6 episodes
2023	The Holiday Shift	Tess	Main role
2024	Ghosting with Luke Hutchie and Matthew Finlan	Herself	1 episode
