= Saving Alex =

2016 memoir by Alex Cooper and Joanna Brooks

- First edition
- Author: Alex Cooper; Joanna Brooks
- Language: English
- Genre: Memoir
- Published: 2016
- Publisher: HarperOne
- Publication place: United States
- Pages: 256
- ISBN: 9780062374608

Saving Alex: When I Was Fifteen I Told My Mormon Parents I Was Gay, and That's When My Nightmare Began is a 2016 memoir by Alex Cooper with Joanna Brooks.

== Summary ==
Alex Cooper, a Mormon 15-year-old, comes out as a lesbian to her parents and tells them she is in love with a girl named Yvette. They throw her out of the house. After Alex stays with a sympathetic neighbor for a while, she is then taken by her parents to a conversion therapy program in Utah run by Johnny and Tiana Siale (who are good friends with Alex's grandparents whom Alex's parents stated that she was going to be staying with) where she is held for eight months against her will.

Cooper is forced to face a wall while wearing a backpack full of stones to "feel the burden of being gay", beaten by Johnny if any escape attempt happens, kept from school, and verbally abused. In addition, if they went to church with the Siales, Alex and anyone in their program are told not to interact with them in any way. She attempts suicide by taking every pill in the house. Also at the house are two boys who Johnny makes hit each other to be more manly, and Johnny joins in on the hitting if they don't hit hard enough.

When Cooper is allowed to enroll in high school, she learns of a gay–straight alliance club that is overseen by her English teacher where they sympathize with her plight. With their help, she is connected with a Salt Lake City attorney named Paul Burke who agrees to represent her pro bono. When one of the teachers calls to inform the Siales that she was late to their class, they pull her out of school and have her face the wall in the usual manner. Once the Siales are sound asleep, Alex successfully escapes from the house, hides near a bus stop until the buses start running, and rides it to the school. Once the school opens, Alex tells her English teacher what happened. This leads to Alex living in a local youth crisis center for a while after being taken there by a friendly police officer.

When it came to the trial, Burke represents her, earning her the right to refuse conversion therapy. Afterwards, Alex opts not to press charges against the Siales as it would not help her move on with her life. Both of the Siales lose their jobs and have their kids taken away from them. Alex reconciles with her parents.

== Reception ==
The book was reviewed in Publishers Weekly, Kirkus Reviews, School Library Journal, and Huffington Post.

== Adaptation ==
On September 18, 2019, Lifetime aired an adaption of this memoir called Trapped: The Alex Cooper Story as part of its "Ripped from the Headlines" feature film series. The film stars Addison Holley as Alex Cooper, Nicolette Pierce as Frankie Jackson (who is based on Yvette), Sara Booth as Tiana Simms (who is based on Tiana Siale), Ian Lake as Johnny Simms (who is based on Johnny Siale), Kate Drummond as Mrs. Cooper, Wilson Cruz as Paul C. Burke, Steven Cumyn as Mr. Cooper, and Elisa Mooncherry as Carol Lynn Nielson (who is based on the English teacher that helped Alex).
