= Teräväinen =

Teräväinen or Teravainen, a surname of Finnish origin, can refer to:

- Jeff Teravainen, Canadian actor
- Kari Teräväinen, Finnish professional ice hockey player, who played for several teams, e.g. HPK and Vaasan Sport
- Peter Teravainen, American professional golfer who most recently played in the European Seniors Tour
- Teuvo Teräväinen, Finnish professional ice hockey player, currently playing for the Carolina Hurricanes of the National Hockey League.
