= Trapped: The Alex Cooper Story =

2019 television biopic

- Television poster
- Genre: Drama
- Based on: Saving Alex by Alex Cooper with Joanna Brooks
- Screenplay by: Michelle Paradise
- Directed by: Jeffrey G. Hunt
- Starring: Addison Holley; Nicolette Pearse; Sara Booth; Ian Lake; Kate Drummond; Wilson Cruz; Steve Cumyn; Elisa Moolecherry
- Country of origin: United States
- Original language: English

Production
- Executive producers: Kyle A. Clark; Jeffrey D. Hunt; Lina Wong
- Producers: Mark Costa; Mary Anne Waterhouse
- Running time: 87 minutes
- Production company: Silver Screen Pictures

Original release
- Network: Lifetime
- Release: September 28, 2019

Trapped: The Alex Cooper Story is a 2019 American biographical drama television film directed by Jeffrey G. Hunt. Produced by Lifetime as part of its "Ripped from the Headlines" feature film series, it aired on September 28, 2019. The film stars Addison Holley, Nicolette Pearse, Sara Booth, Ian Lake, Kate Drummond, Wilson Cruz, Steven Cumyn, and Elisa Mooncherry. The screenplay by Michelle Paradise is based on the 2016 memoir Saving Alex by Alex Cooper and Joanna Brooks, which documents Cooper's experience in being sent to a conversion therapy home and the brutalities she endured while there.

== Plot ==
Late one night, a young woman is running down the street barefoot and ducks behind a parked car to avoid a passing car. After putting on the flip flops that she was carrying, she ducks behind a bus stop. When a bus comes around the corner, she gets in front of it.

9 months ago in Victorville, California, 15-year-old Alex Cooper (Addison Holley) is a student at high school who helps in their recycling program. One day, she meets Frankie Jackson (Nicolette Pearse) and they fall in love. They spend time together at places like the beach, the boardwalk, a bowling alley, and Frankie's house.

When her Mormon parents Jessica and Dennis (Kate Drummond and Steve Cumyn) ask her where she has been spending her time, Alex admits her crush on Frankie. After they throw her out of the house, Alex stays with her sympathetic neighbor Daniella (Alexandra Chavez).

One day, her parents pick her up and tell her she is going to stay in Utah with her grandparents (Roger Dunn and Lynne Griffin) in St. George, Utah for a while. To Alex's surprise, they take her to live with Johnny and Tiana Simms (Ian Lake and Sara Booth), who "take in troubled kids like Alex" and practice conversion therapy and happen to know Alex's grandparents. As their daughter pleads with them to not leave her with strangers, her parents insist this will "help" her so that she may enter the Celestial Kingdom.

Also in the Simms' care is a juvenile ex-con named Damon (Kaleb Horn) who undergoes the Simms' training at the suggestion given to him by his parole officer and a boy named Henry (Dante Scott) who was caught making out with his boyfriend. While Alex is held against her will, doesn't know where she is on a map, and is cut off from all contact with the outside world, the Simms warn her that they know everyone in the community like the teachers and the police and no one will side with her. At first, that appears to be the case as Alex's parents gave the Simms custody and no one will help her. Attempting to force her to disavow her sexual orientation, they force her to stand facing the wall while wearing a backpack full of rocks all day. This even happened when they found out that Alex called her parents begging them to take her out of their program.

She endures this for many days, but for her, lying to end the torture. get in their good graces is not an option, as they are demanding she tell them Frankie's last name as the condition of believing her "conversion" is a success. Each time she tries—asking for help at the alternative high school, using an employee's phone in a restaurant bathroom to call Frankie (who she hopes is looking for her), and passing a note in a grocery store—Johnny hurts her by either punching her or striking her with his belt. On the 94th day, Johnny and Tiana allow Alex to spend Thanksgiving with her parents who are visiting her grandparents and plan to move to Utah. Knowing Frankie is 18, Alex's parents want to press charges against her. Alex clearly loves Frankie as writing to her in a secret journal (where she also records the number of days she has been held captive) has been her only salve.

Wanting to protect Frankie, but no longer able to withstand the physical and emotional pain, Alex attempts suicide by taking an entire bottle of pills, leaving a suicide note for her parents as she submerges herself in bathwater. Johnny pulls her out of the water and Tiana scolds her for doing something worse than running in their daughter's bathtub. Johnny and Tiana get Alex a session with Bishop Carver (Laurie Murdock). She tells him what he needs to know, but he does not give any good advice to help with her plight.

Eventually, Alex breaks down and gives them her girlfriend's last name and assures them that she is straight, following all of their rules for 77 days. As a result, they let her go to school, her first real contact with others besides the Simms and their enablers. They again lecture her that they know all the teachers and administrators—who watch and report her every move—and they are mostly correct. In addition, she is to use the cover story that she is in town helping her grandparents.

At school, Alex meets a friendly student named Jason (Stephen Joffe) and his English teacher Mrs. Carol Lynn Nielson (Elisa Moolecherry). Later, Alex finds out they head the school's Gay-Straight Alliance, and that Jason himself is openly gay. Alex then learns that Jason has also struggled with discrimination and suicidal thoughts, but he shares that he is able to endure because his mom is loving and accepting. Rightly believing she could trust him, one day she hurriedly tells Jason some of what she has been forced to go through. However, Carol Lynn is also in the room and Alex panics, worried the teacher will tell someone. Carol Lynn and Jason quickly convince her that both intend to help.

One day, Carol Lynn and Jason contact Salt Lake City attorney Paul Burke (Wilson Cruz) who previously helped Jason. After Alex tells Paul of her ordeal. he promises to represent her pro bono. Paul also agrees to represent Frankie should Alex's parents have her arrested. Yet, Alex is late for class while on the phone with him.

The Simms are notified. This seemingly small slip up is enough to convince the Simms that Alex is hiding something. Tiana declares that Alex is hereby pulled out of school as she and Johnny force her to stand facing the wall with a backpack full of rocks. That night, Alex removes the backpack while everyone is sound asleep. She grabs her flip flops and runs out of the house barefoot.

Back in the present, the bus driver stops and agrees to take her to school without contacting the cops (who might return her to the Simms). Once she arrives, Alex hides on school grounds.

The next morning, Alex goes to Carol Lynn who contacts police and child services. Here, we find out definitively that although the Simms had a lot of influence throughout the community, their declaration that everyone would side with them against Alex was clearly a lie meant to further isolate her and discourage her from seeking help. As evidence for this conclusion, Carol Lynn goes to the main office with Alex and informs the secretaries that she will have them arrested if they notify the Simms that Alex is here. Jason is also informed about what happened. A friendly female police officer takes Alex to the St. George Youth Crisis Center, where she tells a worker named Colette (Natalie Liconti) she has been kept at the Simms' for 243 days, 8 months.

Alex is still not convinced that she is safe, prompting Colette to assure her that neither the Simms nor her parents will be able to take her away due to the advocacy and legal work of a lot of people, including attorney Paul Burke (resources most kids don't have). Colette then promises Alex that not everybody is like the Simms and that she is perfect the way she is. Colette asks if there is anyone that she'd like to call for her.

The next morning, Alex is awoken by the arrival of a vehicle. She finds that Frankie has arrived. Alex runs outside and reunites with her in joyous embrace.

A postscript states that after months of legal battles in Utah, Paul and Alex won the right for Alex to live as an openly gay teenager. No one, not even her parents, could force her to return to conversion therapy. Alex and her parents have since reconciled. Alex's father has offered to walk her down the aisle someday, should she marry the woman of her dreams.

== Cast ==
- Addison Holley as Alex Cooper
- Nicolette Pearse as Frankie Jackson
- Ian Lake as Jonathan "Johnny" Simms
- Sarah Booth as Tiana Simms
- Kate Drummond as Jessica Cooper
- Wilson Cruz as Paul C. Burke
- Steve Cumyn as Dennis Cooper
- Elisa Moolecherry as Carol Lynn Nielson
- Stephen Joffe as Jason
- Kaleb Horn as Damon
- Dante Scott as Henry
- Sofie Michal Maiuri as Mary
- Emma Victoria Jackson as Emma
- Alexander Elliot as Spencer
- Leo Orgil as Wyatt
- Alexandra Chavez as Daniella Lopez
- Humberly González as Hannah Lopez
- Lynne Griffin as Grandma
- Michelle Arvizu as Sister Lopez
- Roger Dunn as Grandpa
- Laurie Murdock as Bishop Carver
- Natalie Liconti as Colette
- Nile Séguin as Mr. Lewis
- Pip Dwyer as Sandra
- Agueda Cardenas as Cleaning Lady
- Sharon McFarlane as Administrator
- David Frisch as Teacher
- Drew Haytaoglu as Elder Thompson
- Jamillah Ross as Cop
- Konima Parkinson-Jones as Officer Janney
- Nicolas James Wilson as Elder Sanders
- Art Hindle as Church Leader
- Jon H. Epstein as Bus Driver
- Marie Dame as Sister Young (uncredited)
