= Ella the Elephant =

- Genre: Animated television series Adventure
- Based on: Ella the Elegant Elephant by Carmela and Steven D'Amico
- Directed by: Larry Jacobs
- Voices of: Addison Holley; Annick Obonsawin; Avery Kadish; Devan Cohen
- Theme music composer: Brent Barkman; Earl Torno
- Opening theme: "Ella Theme", performed by Addison Holley
- Ending theme: "Ella Theme" (instrumental)
- Composer: Brent Barkman
- Country of origin: Canada
- Original language: English
- No. of seasons: 1
- No. of episodes: 26 (52 shorts)

Production
- Executive producers: Michael Hirsh; Toper Taylor; John Vandervelde; Sander Schwartz; Alyssa Cooper Sapire; For TVOKids: Patricia Ellingson
- Producer: Jonah Stroh
- Running time: 22 minutes
- Production companies: Atomic Cartoons; TVOKids; Disney Junior Original Productions; FremantleMedia Kids & Family Entertainment; DHX Cookie Jar Inc. The Canadian Film or Video Tax Credit; The Ontario Film and Television Tax Credit; Film Finances Canada Ltd.

Original release
- Network: TVOKids (Canada); Disney Junior (U.S.)
- Release: September 2, 2013 – January 23, 2014

Ella the Elephant is a Canadian animated television preschool series based on the books by the couple Carmela D'Amico and Steven Henry (born Steven D'Amico). The series premiered on TVOKids in Canada on September 2, 2013 and Disney Junior on February 17, 2014. The series was produced by DHX Cookie Jar Inc. (owned by WildBrain), in association with TVOKids and FremantleMedia Kids & Family Entertainment, with animation provided by Atomic Cartoons, with the series' funding provided by The Canadian Film or Video Production Tax Credit and The Ontario Film and Television Tax Credit. The series' completion guarantee was provided by Film Finances Canada Ltd.

The series follows the adventures of Ella (voiced by Addison Holley) and her friends on Elephant Island. Ella is a spirited anthropomorphic little girl elephant with a magic hat that can transform into almost anything. Every day, there's a fantastic new adventure as Ella and her friends, Frankie (voiced by Devan Cohen), Belinda (voiced by Annick Obonsawin), and Tiki (voiced by Avery Kadish), get themselves into some tricky situations.

== Premise ==
The series follows the adventures of Ella and her friends on Elephant Island. Ella is a spirited little girl elephant with a big heart, bigger imagination and a magic hat that can transform into almost anything. Every day, there's a fantastic new adventure as Ella and her friends, Frankie, Belinda and Tiki, get themselves into some tricky situations. With a little determination, teamwork, a few missteps, and a touch of magic, Ella and her friends work to make everything work out in the end.

== Characters ==
=== Main ===
- Ella (voiced by Addison Holley) is the main character and a young elephant with a red magic hat that her grandma gave to her. Ella is a problem-solver who is nice and kind to all her friends. Her magic hat transforms into different items depending on what she needs it for.
- Belinda (voiced by Annick Obonsawin) is an elephant who is lucky enough to have Elephant Island's mayor for her father, as well as a friend to Ella. Belinda loves to dance and is a total diva.
- Tiki (voiced by Avery Kadish) is a smart female elephant who loves reading books and riding her bike. She has a pet monkey named Lola.
- Frankie (voiced by Devan Cohen) is a friend of Ella's who is a young elephant as well and is the only male of the group. Frankie's catchphrase is "Great woolly mammoth!"

=== Recurring ===
- Lola (voiced by Rob Tinkler) is a pet monkey who is owned by Tiki.
- Mrs. Briggs (voiced by Helen Taylor) is Ella, Belinda, Frankie, Tiki, Ada, and Ida's teacher who likes interpretive dancing.
- Ada and Ida (voiced by Sophia Ewaniuk) are twin elephants who sometimes say things at the same time. When they do, they high-five and say "Jinx!" followed by a giggle. Ada and Ida are a little hard to tell apart, but they both love to sing.
- Captain Kelp (voiced by Neil Crone) is an elephant who works in a lighthouse.
- Mrs. Grey (voiced by Stacey DePass) is Ella's mother who is a baker.
- Captain Shamus Grey (also voiced by Neil Crone) is Ella's father who is captain of the sea.
- Mrs. Harriet Melba (voiced by Shoshana Sperling) is Frankie's mother who briefly owned Mrs. Grey’s bakery when she was sick.
- Mr. Mercer (voiced by Phil Williams) is an elephant who sells many items. Ella and her friends visit him often. He is sometimes grumpy.
- Georgie (voiced by Jaxon Mercey) is a little elephant who is Frankie's little brother.
- Mayor Jeremiah Blue (voiced by Danny Wells) is an elephant who is Belinda's father. The mayor of Elephant Island.
- Grandma Grey (voiced by Catherine Disher) is an elephant who is Ella's grandma and the original owner of the magic hat. She appeared in the episode "Grandma's Visit".
- Old Lady (voiced by Julie Lemieux) is a lady elephant with an unknown name who appeared in the episode "Hello Dolly", where Frankie accidentally sold Ella's doll to the lady.
- Jasper (also voiced by Julie Lemieux) is a little mouse who causes trouble with Ella and her friends.
- E.L. Weathers (voiced by Alyson Court) is an elephant who writes books. She appeared in the episode "Tiki's Quest".
- Mrs. Everheart (voiced by Helen King) is an elephant who is a librarian. She also appeared in the episode "Tiki's Quest".
- Mrs. Potter (voiced by Susan Roman) is an elephant who carves pumpkins in Halloween time. She appeared in the episode "Frankie's Perfect Pumpkin".
- Sammy (voiced by Peter DaCunha) is an elephant who does newspaper deliveries in Elephant Island. He appeared in the episode "Ella's Special Delivery".
- Mikey (voiced by Gage Munroe) in an elephant who helps Sammy do newspaper deliveries. He also appeared in the episode "Ella's Special Delivery".
- Caretaker (voiced by John Stocker) is an elephant who operates the museum. He appeared in the episode "Jurassic Sleepover".
- Mayor's Assistant (voiced by Catherine Disher) is an elephant who helps Belinda's dad. She appeared in the episode "Mayor Belinda".
- Mrs. Brim (voiced by Linda Ballantyne) is an elephant who works at a hat store. She appeared in the episode "Ella's Haywire Hat".
- Max von Mastodon (voiced by Juan Chioran) is an elephant who is a famous filmmaker. He appeared in the episode "Lights, Camera, Ella".

== Episodes ==
All episodes were directed by Larry Jacobs.

No.	Title	Directed by	Written by	TVOKids (Canada) air date	Disney Junior (US) air date	Prod. code
1	"Soapbox Squabble"	Larry Jacobs	Christin Simms	September 2, 2013	February 19, 2014	101b
Ella and Frankie compete in the Soapbox Derby.
2	"Girls' Club"	Larry Jacobs	Christin Simms	September 3, 2013	February 19, 2014	101a
Belinda starts a club for girls.
3	"Trunk Troopers"	Larry Jacobs	Story by : Shelia Dinsmore; Teleplay by : J.D. Smith	September 4, 2013	February 18, 2014	102a
Ella and Belinda get lost in the forest while trying to earn a Butterfly Badge.
4	"Ella in Charge"	Larry Jacobs	Story by : Shelia Dinsmore; Teleplay by : Dave Dias	September 5, 2013	February 18, 2014	102b
Ella and Frankie's Mom fill in for Ella's mom at the bakery.
5	"Ella Bakes a Cake"	Larry Jacobs	Shelia Dinsmore	September 6, 2013	February 21, 2014	103a
The kids compete in the Junior Cake-Baking Contest.
6	"Camp Ella"	Larry Jacobs	Story by : Shelia Dinsmore; Teleplay by : Ben Joseph	September 9, 2013	February 21, 2014	103b
Tiki goes camping in Ella's backyard.
7	"Ella's Got Talent"	Larry Jacobs	Story by : Shelia Dinsmore; Teleplay by : J.D. Smith	September 10, 2013	February 17, 2014	104a
Ella has trouble coming up with an act for the talent show.
8	"Safety First"	Larry Jacobs	Story by : Shelia Dinsmore; Teleplay by : Kim Thompson	September 11, 2013	February 17, 2014	104b
Ella takes on the responsibility of being a playground safety officer.
9	"Ella Sheds Some Light"	Larry Jacobs	Story by : Shelia Dinsmore; Teleplay by : Robert Ardiel	September 12, 2013	February 27, 2014	105a
Ella and Frankie take care of Captain Kelp's lighthouse.
10	"Stylish Ella"	Larry Jacobs	Story by : Shelia Dinsmore; Teleplay by : Ben Joseph	September 13, 2013	February 27, 2014	105b
Belinda is excited for her school's Picture Day.
11	"Ella's Top 100"	Larry Jacobs	Hugh Duffy	September 16, 2013	March 6, 2014	106b
The 100th day of the school year is here.
12	"Hat Mishap"	Larry Jacobs	Story by : Shelia Dinsmore; Teleplay by : Franklin Young and Kim Thompson	September 17, 2013	March 6, 2014	106a
Tiki's starring in the school play, and races to get to the theatre after an outing.
13	"Treasure Hunters"	Larry Jacobs	Jamie Wease	September 18, 2013	February 20, 2014	107a
Ella, Frankie, Belinda and Tiki discover a treasure map.
14	"Ella Borrows Trouble"	Larry Jacobs	Karen Moonah	September 19, 2013	February 20, 2014	107b
Ella loses Frankie's toy helicopter.
15	"Ella on the Ball"	Larry Jacobs	Christin Simms	September 20, 2013	February 24, 2014	108a
When a member of the soccer team gets hurt, Ella's friends beg her to fill in.
16	"Up, Up and Away"	Larry Jacobs	Bernice Vanderlaan	September 23, 2013	February 24, 2014	108b
Elephant Islands is having a Kite contest, where teams have to make a unique kite.
17	"Tea Party Trouble"	Larry Jacobs	Dale Schott; Scott Albert	September 24, 2013	February 25, 2014	109a
Ella has a tea party.
18	"Home Again"	Larry Jacobs	Jamie Waese	September 25, 2013	February 25, 2014	109b
The kids participate in their school's Open House.
19	"Stormy Mom Day"	Larry Jacobs	J.D. Smith	September 26, 2013	May 5, 2014	110a
A rainstorm causes Ella and Frankie's to rethink their Mother's Day plans.
20	"Team Spirit"	Larry Jacobs	Karen Moonah	September 27, 2013	May 5, 2014	110b
Mrs. Briggs' class designs a scoreboard.
21	"Monkey Business"	Larry Jacobs	Shelley Hoffman; Robert Pincombe	September 30, 2013	February 26, 2014	111b
Ella has to look after a pet monkey.
22	"Ella's Carnival"	Larry Jacobs	Karen Moonah	October 1, 2013	February 26, 2014	111a
Ella and her friends go to a carnival at town.
23	"Hello Dolly"	Larry Jacobs	Jason Hopley	October 2, 2013	December 6, 2014	112b
Frankie accidentally sells Ella's doll.
24	"That's Swellaphant!"	Larry Jacobs	Story by : Shelley Hoffman and Robert Pincombe; Teleplay by : Atul Rao	October 3, 2013	December 6, 2014	112a
Ella and her friends participate in the festivities of Swellaphant Day.
25	"Ella for Class President"	Larry Jacobs	Bernice Vanderlaan; Jason Hopley	October 4, 2013	March 3, 2014	113b
Belinda, Tiki and Frankie run for class president.
26	"Ella's Sleepless Sleepover"	Larry Jacobs	Betty Quan	October 7, 2013	March 3, 2014	113a
Ella and Tiki go to Belinda's house for a sleepover.
27	"Ready, Set, Go... Slow?!"	Larry Jacobs	Story by : Shelley Hoffman and Robert Pincombe; Teleplay by : Brian Hartigan	October 8, 2013	March 4, 2014	114a
Ella replaces Frankie in a race after he hurts his leg.
28	"Ella's Antics"	Larry Jacobs	Steve Wright; Diana Moore	October 9, 2013	March 4, 2014	114b
Ella has built an ant farm, but the farm collapsed when she didn't take her time.
29	"Tiki's Snow Fun"	Larry Jacobs	Story by : Shelia Dinsmore; Teleplay by : Dave Dias	October 10, 2013	December 13, 2014	115b
Ella, Belinda, Tiki and Frankie go to Snowy Island for a day of fun.
30	"Parade Problem"	Larry Jacobs	Story by : Jonah Stroh and Phil McCordic; Written by : Scott Albert	October 11, 2013	December 13, 2014	115a
Ella and friends get lost on the way to a parade.
31	"Ella's Hiccups"	Larry Jacobs	Diana Moore	October 14, 2013	March 10, 2014	116a
Ella gets a bad case of the hiccups.
32	"Queen Tusk's Treasure"	Larry Jacobs	Story by : Jonah Stroh; Teleplay by : Jason Hopley	October 15, 2013	March 10, 2014	116b
There's a new exhibit at the museum.
33	"By Invitation Only"	Larry Jacobs	Scott Albert	October 16, 2013	March 17, 2014	117a
Ella's friends begin to act strange when it's her birthday.
34	"Seashell Serenade"	Larry Jacobs	Atul Rao	October 17, 2013	March 17, 2014	117b
Ella and friends attempt to revive the conch orchestra.
35	"Tiki's Moving Day"	Larry Jacobs	Story by : Jonah Stroh; Teleplay by : Alan Resnick	October 18, 2013	March 24, 2014	118b
Tiki is moving away and Ella wants her to stay.
36	"Trunk Your Record"	Larry Jacobs	Story by : Jonah Stroh; Teleplay by : Brian Hartigan	October 21, 2013	March 24, 2014	118a
Frankie wants to break a record, like everyone in his family did.
37	"Super Helpful Elephant Heroes"	Larry Jacobs	Story by : Jonah Stroh; Teleplay by : Dave Dias	October 22, 2013	April 14, 2014	119a
Ella and Frankie become helpful heroes after reading a comic book.
38	"Ella Goes to the Birds"	Larry Jacobs	Story by : Jonah Stroh; Teleplay by : Brian Hartigan	October 23, 2013	April 14, 2014	119b
Ella finds an old instrument acts as a call for birds..
39	"Picture This"	Larry Jacobs	Atul Rao; Brian Hartigan	October 24, 2013	April 21, 2014	120b
Ella goes to take pictures around the island.
40	"Ella's Dance Off"	Larry Jacobs	Story by : Jonah Stroh; Teleplay by : Dave Dias	October 25, 2013	April 21, 2014	120a
Belinda and Frankie have a dance contest.
41	"Tiki's Quest"	Larry Jacobs	Story by : Brad Birch; Teleplay by : Brian Hartigan	October 28, 2013	May 19, 2014	121b
Tiki has to complete a challenging quest.
42	"Frankie the Brain"	Larry Jacobs	Stephen Sender	October 29, 2013	May 19, 2014	121a
Frankie and Belinda's assignments have accidentally been switched by Ella.
43	"Frankie's Perfect Pumpkin"	Larry Jacobs	Story by : Jonah Stroh; Teleplay by : Brian Hartigan	October 30, 2013	October 3, 2014	122a
Frankie makes the best Jack-o-Lantern ever.
44	"Ella's Special Delivery"	Larry Jacobs	Story by : Jonah Stroh; Teleplay by : Patrick Granleese	October 31, 2013	October 3, 2014	122b
Ella does a newspaper route around town.
45	"Jurassic Sleepover"	Larry Jacobs	Jason Hopley	November 1, 2013	June 2, 2014	123a
Ella and friends go on a sleepover at the museum.
46	"Grandma's Visit"	Larry Jacobs	Story by : Jonah Stroh; Teleplay by : Patrick Granleese	November 4, 2013	June 2, 2014	123b
Ella and her grandmother try to find the one and only troop stamp they didn't earn.
47	"Mayor Belinda"	Larry Jacobs	Brad Birch	November 5, 2013	July 14, 2014	124a
Ella and friends help Mayor Blue at his office until he is called away and Belinda takes over for him.
48	"Ella's Haywire Hat"	Larry Jacobs	Story by : Jonah Stroh; Teleplay by : Brian Hartigan	November 6, 2013	July 14, 2014	124b
Ella's hat begins to act strange.
49	"Lights, Camera, Ella"	Larry Jacobs	Patrick Granleese	January 20, 2014	August 18, 2014	125a
Ella becomes an accidental film star after a famous filmmaker arrives on the island. Note: This episode was dedicated “in loving memory” to Danny Wells, who has voiced Mayor Blue, as he died on November 28, 2013. And this is the last episode that Danny Wells voices Mayor Blue.
50	"Ella's Island"	Larry Jacobs	Jonah Stroh	January 21, 2014	August 18, 2014	125b
A fog strands Ella's dad, her, and her friends on an undiscovered island during a day of sailing.
51	"Ella Elephant Sits"	Larry Jacobs	Dale Schott	January 22, 2014	September 8, 2014	126a
Ella has to babysit Frankie's little brother, Georgie.
52	"Ella's Pet Problem"	Larry Jacobs	Shelia Dinsmore	January 23, 2014	September 8, 2014	126b
Ella conquers her fear of Jasper, a little mouse and they become friends.

== Production ==
The series was produced by DHX Cookie Jar Inc. for TVOKids and Disney Junior, with animation provided by Atomic Cartoons. It was distributed by DHX Media in Canada, the United States, Middle East, and India, and FremantleMedia Kids & Family in other markets. The series was partially funded by the Canadian Film or Video Production Tax Credit and the Ontario Film and Television Tax Credit, with completion guarantee provided by Film Finances Canada Ltd. Carmela D' Amico & Steven D' Amico are the adapters of the series, while Larry Jacobs is the director. Executive producers includes Michael Hirsh, Toper Taylor, and John Vandervelde for DHX Cookie Jar Inc., Sander Schwartz and Alyssa Cooper Sapire for FremantleMedia Kids & Family and Patricia Ellingson for TVOKids. Other staff for the series includes Jonah Stroh as producer and Brad Birch as executive story editor.

On February 7, 2012, Chris Arrant, news editor of Cartoon Brew, announced that the series entered production. Toper Taylor, president and COO of Cookie Jar was pleasantly thrilled for the production of Ella the Elephant and said: "Ella is a magical property about an ever ebullient, optimistic, responsible, compassionate little elephant whose kindred spirit will delight our preschool audience." "We are thrilled to be working with both Disney and Fremantle on the series' global launch."

Sander Schwartz, President, Kids & Family Entertainment, FME, said "We are very pleased to be partnered with Cookie Jar on what we believe will be a hugely successful series. Bringing these wonderful books to life is a labour of love for everyone working on this stunning series".

== Distribution ==
=== Broadcast ===
The series is broadcast on TVOKids and Disney Junior. The series premiered in Canada on September 2, 2013 and in the United States on February 17, 2014. Other broadcasters includes Tiny Pop in the UK, ABC 4 Kids in Australia and RTÉjr in Ireland. Since June 23, 2014, Disney Junior (Latin America) started airing the show. TiJi (France), Clan (Spain), MiniMini+ (Poland), Minimax (Eastern and Central Europe), KiKA (Germany) and MTV3 Juniori (Finland) had recently acquired the show and will add it to their lineup in 2014.

=== Home media ===
Episodes of Ella the Elephant are available for digital download through the iTunes Music Store, which are split into two volumes.

On August 6, 2014, Shock Entertainment (under license from FremantleMedia) released a 154-minute Region 4 DVD of the show. On September 16, 2014, Warner Home Video released Volume 1 on DVD for Canada and the US. It contains eight full episodes, making sixteen segments altogether.

As of February 28, 2015, the series became available for streaming on the American Netflix.

== Critical reception ==
Common Sense Media rated the show 4 stars out of 5, with the review stating that "Strong messages of friendship and kindness are central to each story, and the young characters use their imaginations to solve the little troubles they and their neighbors face."
