= Utopia Falls =

Science fiction TV show

- Title card
- Genre: Drama; Science fiction Musical
- Created by: R.T. Thorne
- Starring: Robyn Alomar; Akiel Julien; Robbie Graham-Kuntz; Phillip Lewitski; Humberly González; Devyn Nekoda; Mickeey Nguyen; Kate Drummond; Jeff Teravainen; Sean Baek; Snoop Dogg
- Composer: Nikhil Seetharam
- Country of origin: Canada
- Original language: English
- No. of seasons: 1
- No. of episodes: 10 (list of episodes)

Production
- Executive producers: Joseph Mallozzi; R.T. Thorne; Andrea Gorfolova; Ashley Rite
- Production locations: Toronto, Ontario, Canada
- Running time: 60 minutes
- Production company: Sonar Entertainment

Original release
- Network: Hulu; CBC Gem
- Release: February 14, 2020

Utopia Falls is a Canadian science fiction television series. Created by R.T. Thorne with Joseph Mallozzi as showrunner, the show premiered on the streaming service Hulu on February 14, 2020.

== Plot ==
In the distant future, a colony of humans live in a city called New Babyl under a dome to protect them from the aftermath of a great war that killed all other life on Earth. The city is divided into four sectors – Progress, Industry, Nature, and Reform – and is ruled over by a governing authority known as the Tribunal.

A yearly performing arts contest called the Exemplar is held for teens who have turned 16. While competing, a group of the competitors discover an ancient archive hidden in the forest on the outskirts of New Babyl filled with forbidden historical, cultural and musical relics which forces them to question everything they have been taught.

Each sector in New Babyl has a distinctive coloured uniform that is a type of jumpsuit / overall. Progress citizens wear blue, Nature citizens wear green, Industry citizens wear orange, and Reform citizens wear grey.

== Cast ==
=== Main ===
- Robyn Alomar as Aliyah 5, Exemplar candidate from Progress Sector
- Akiel Julien as Bohdi 2, Exemplar candidate from Reform Sector
- Robbie Graham-Kuntz as Tempo 3, Exemplar candidate from Progress Sector
- Phillip Lewitski as Apollo 4, Exemplar candidate from Industry Sector
- Humberly González as Brooklyn 2, Exemplar candidate from Industry Sector
- Devyn Nekoda as Sage 5, Exemplar candidate from Nature Sector
- Mickeey Nguyen as Mags 2, Exemplar candidate from Reform Sector
- Kate Drummond as Authority Phydra, head of security for New Babyl
- Jeff Teravainen as Gerald, father of Aliyah 5
- Sean Baek as Ryden, member of the Tribunal of New Babyl
- Snoop Dogg as The Archive (voice)

=== Recurring ===
- Alexandra Castillo as Chancellor Diara, Chancellor of New Babyl
- Husein Madhavji as Mentor Watts, mentor for The Exemplar
- Corteon Moore as Kris 12
- Kyal Legend as Sierra 5
- Milton Barnes as Mentor Chapter, mentor for The Exemplar
- Raven Dauda as Reia, member of the Tribunal of New Babyl
- Jonathan Langdon as Regget
- Stephanie Hood as Nada 4
- Andrew Musselman as Authority Taggart
- Dwain Murphy as Moore Times
- Brenda Bazinet as Gran Riel, surrogate parent to Sage 5
- Diane Johnstone as Gran Chyra, surrogate parent to Sage 5

== Episodes ==
No.	Title	Directed by	Written by	Original release date
1	"The World Is Yours"	R.T. Thorne	R.T. Thorne & Joseph Mallozzi	February 14, 2020
In New Babyl, the last surviving colony on Earth, Aliyah 5 discovers a secret cache called The Archive, a discovery that will alter her view on the world forever.
2	"Can I Kick It"	R.T. Thorne	Courtney Jane Walker	February 14, 2020
Aliyah 5 discovers her mother may have had a connection to The Archive.
3	"99 Problems"	Sudz Sutherland	Joseph Mallozzi	February 14, 2020
Authority Phydra interrogates Bohdi 2 whilst Aliyah 5 leads the other Exemplar candidates in a protest inspired by the civil rights movement in order to gain Bohdi's release.
4	"Run This Town"	Sudz Sutherland	Alejandro Alcoba	February 14, 2020
Aliyah 5 and the other candidates decide to use information from The Archive to have a hip-hop inspired routine for their group round in The Exemplar.
5	"Lose Control"	Melanie Orr	Nicole Demerse	February 14, 2020
Aliyah 5, Apollo 4, Bohdi 2, and Brooklyn 2 head out to the edge of New Babyl to see if there is life beyond the shield.
6	"Hate Me Now"	Melanie Orr	Alex Levine	February 14, 2020
Aliyah 5 and the other candidates all struggle with a new reality as they come to terms with how their actions have resulted in a Tribunal backlash.
7	"Lost Ones"	Warren P. Sonoda	Andrew Burrows-Trotman	February 14, 2020
Authority Phydra searches for all of the candidates who are connected to The Archive.
8	"The Light"	Warren P. Sonoda	Natalia Guled	February 14, 2020
The Exemplar semifinals are within sight and Aliyah 5 learns the truth about New Babyl.
9	"Worst Behaviour"	R.T. Thorne	Alejandro Alcoba	February 14, 2020
Bohdi 2 and Aliyah 5 join a covert rebel group in New Babyl while Authority Phydra hunts down a mole in the Tribunal.
10	"If I Ruled the World"	R.T. Thorne	Joseph Mallozzi	February 14, 2020
Aliyah 5 plans to reveal the truth about New Babyl to the rest of the city during The Exemplar final.

== Production ==
Principal photography for the first season began in Toronto, Ontario, Canada, on March 1, 2019.

=== Development ===
Series creator R.T. Thorne says of the show:

People definitely looked at me weird when I first threw it out there a few years ago, just this idea of science fiction and hip-hop. But what was interesting to me, is that even though they didn't know what to make of it, everybody wanted to understand more. There are black nerds out there that love whatever they love and it's a beautiful time to be able to create in that space and know that it will find people or people will find it. I'm happy that I get to show that to other black kids walking around so they know that that is not out of our reach. That it's a reality that a black woman can lead the world.

== Broadcast ==
Utopia Falls premiered on Hulu in the United States and CBC Gem in Canada on February 14, 2020, with all 10 episodes available to stream. It is not yet known which overseas territories that do not have access to Hulu or CBC Gem will broadcast the show. The show premiered on South Korean channel AXN in July 2023. It is currently available to stream on Tubi in the United Kingdom.

== Critical response ==
Review aggregation website Rotten Tomatoes gave season 1 an approval rating of 43%, with an average of 4.51/10 based on reviews from 14 critics. Metacritic gave the series an average score of 39 out of 100, based on reviews from 5 critics.

Tai Gooden of Nerdist compared the premise to that of the Hunger Games series and Divergent, and said: "it's a musical sci-fi dystopian mystery/drama where kids try to dismantle a system through creative dance. It is both unlike anything on TV and exactly like a lot of what fans have seen before in terms of typical genre tropes." Daniel Fienberg of The Hollywood Reporter said: "think of Utopia Falls as a Child's First Guide to Dystopia and a Child's First Guide to Hip-Hop. It skews really young, really basic and really simplistic, but if you can accept how primitive and occasionally even amateurish it is, maybe you'll be able to fixate on the terrific soundtrack and promising young cast and ignore how many times you've seen basically this story delivered with vastly more polish."

Nicole Hill of Den of Geek wrote "Utopia Falls, Hulu's latest TV series offering, has a premise straight out of young adult fiction. Every year, New Babyl hosts 'The Exemplar,' which sees twenty-four teenagers participate in a musical competition to win the title, and make history. It's Divergent meets Step Up and how you feel about either or both of those franchises is probably a good barometer for how you will feel about Utopia Falls." Joel Keller of Decider said: "Hulu is billing Utopia Falls as 'the first ever sci-fi hip-hop television series,' and it's easy to see why such a thing hasn't been created before. Sci-fi has been a generally white genre, and one that's more concerned with drama than dancing, singing and rapping. That may sound like we're being wiseasses, but nothing could be further from the truth; the idea that a sci-fi show could be made from a younger, more diverse perspective is a welcome change. But is Utopia Falls that show?"

== See also ==
- List of science fiction television programs
- List of science fiction TV and radio shows produced in Canada
- List of original programs distributed by Hulu
