= Alexander Elliot (actor) =

Canadian actor (born 2004)

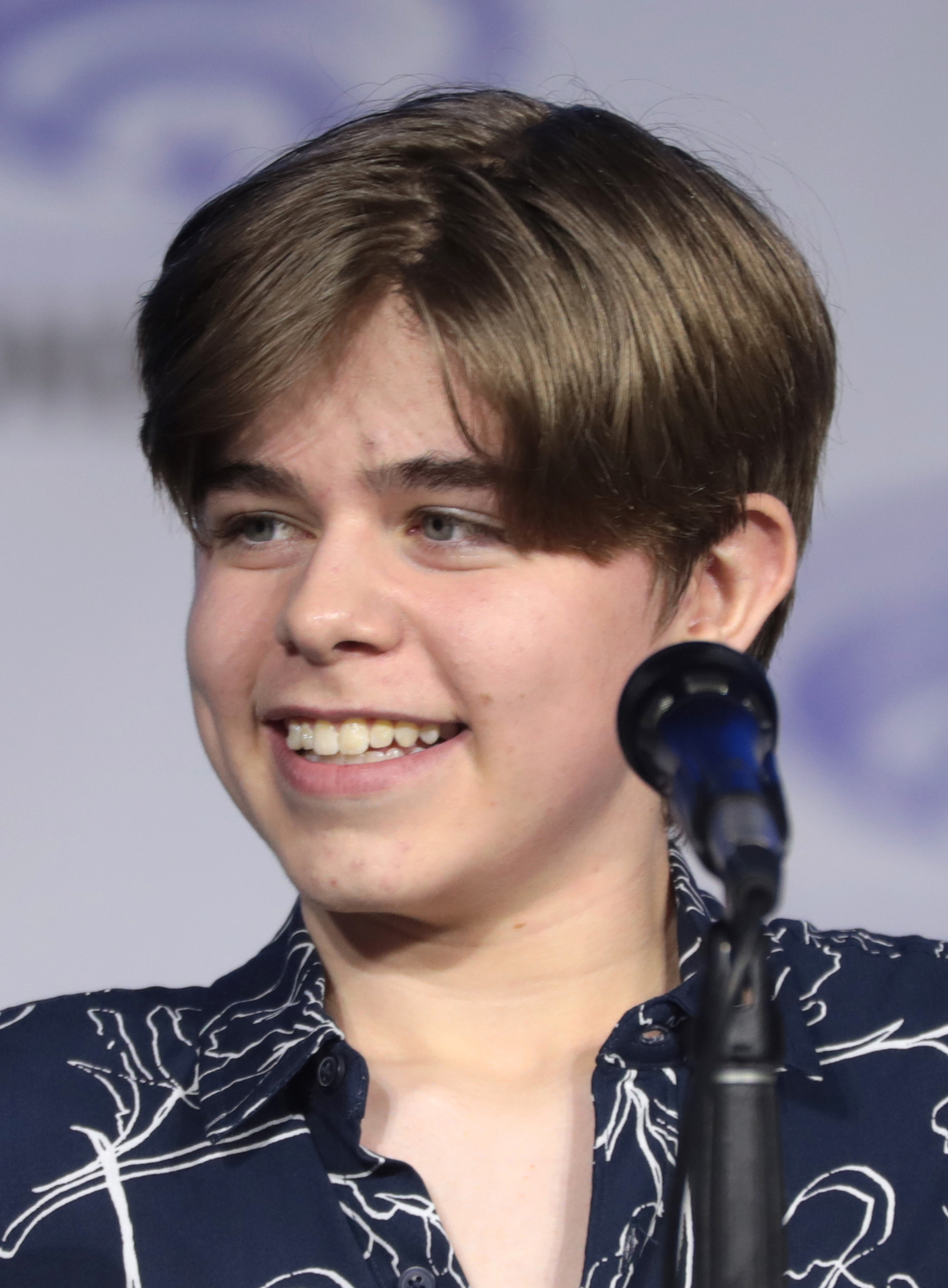
- Elliot at the 2022 WonderCon
- Born: December 8, 2004; Toronto, Canada
- Occupation: Actor
- Years active: 2018–present
- Known for: Joe Hardy in The Hardy Boys

Alexander Elliot (born December 8, 2004) is a Canadian actor. He is known for starring as Joe Hardy on the 2020 television series adaptation The Hardy Boys, opposite Rohan Campbell as Frank.

Elliot is from Toronto. He began acting and dancing at six. He has appeared on the series Detention Adventure, Odd Squad, and Locke & Key, and the films Trapped: The Alex Cooper Story and Violent Night.

== Filmography ==
=== Film ===
Year	Title	Role	Notes
2021	Being Brave	Beckett	Short
2022	Violent Night	Bert	
2023	Thanksgiving	Kid at Party	
2024	All the Lost Ones	Wyatt	
2025	Dateless to Dangerous: My Son's Secret Life	Miles Miller	Television film (Lifetime)
TBA	The Pros and Cons of Killing Yourself	Milo	Short

=== Television ===
Year	Title	Role	Notes
2018	Odd Squad	Agent O'Que	1 Episode
2019	Detention Adventure	Gordon	1 Episode
2019	Trapped: The Alex Cooper Story	Spencer	Television film
2020	Locke & Key	Neighbourhood Kid #1	1 Episode
2020–2023	The Hardy Boys	Joe Hardy	Main role
2021	Murdoch Mysteries	Buster Keaton	1 Episode
2021	Workin' Moms	Gentle Teen Boy	1 Episode
2024	Law & Order Toronto: Criminal Intent	Oscar	1 Episode
