= Keana Lyn Bastidas =

Canadian actress (born 1998)

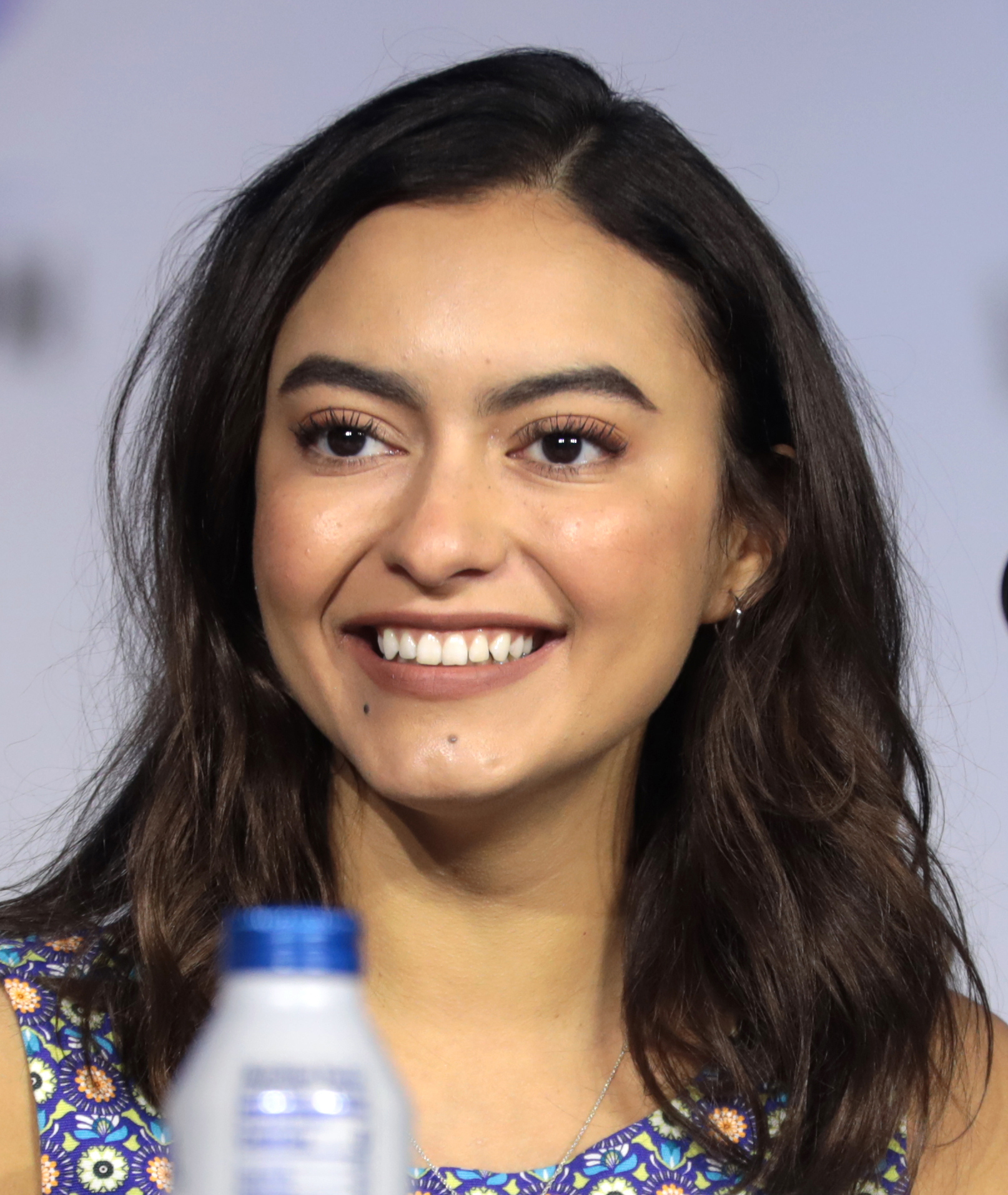
- Lyn Bastidas at the 2022 WonderCon.
- Born: March 18, 1998 (age 28); Toronto, Ontario, Canada
- Other names: Keana Bastidas; Keana Lyn
- Occupation: Actress
- Years active: 2004–present
- Known for: Callie Shaw in The Hardy Boys; The Yard
- Relatives: Maia Jae Bastidas (sister)

Keana Lyn Bastidas (born March 18, 1998), sometimes credited as Keana Bastidas or Keana Lyn, is a Canadian actress.

== Career ==
Bastidas is most noted for her performances as Suzi in The Yard, and as Callie Shaw in the 2020 series The Hardy Boys.

For her work on The Yard, she received a Canadian Screen Award nomination for Best Supporting Actress in a Comedy Series at the 1st Canadian Screen Awards in 2013.

== Filmography ==
=== Film ===
Year	Title	Role	Notes
2004	Superbabies: Baby Geniuses 2	Rosita	
2018	Every Day	Stephanie	
2021	The Family	Mary	
2024	Festival of the Living Dead	Destini	
2025	Undertone	Jessa (voice)	

=== Television ===
Year	Title	Role	Notes
2005	Air Crash Investigation	Michelle Dussan	Episode: "Lost"
2010	Dino Dan	Jordan	9 episodes
2011	The Yard	Suzi	6 episodes
2015	Hemlock Grove	Kid #2	Episode: "Boy in the Box"
2016	Backstage	Cynthia	Episode: "The Understudy"
2016, 2017	Annedroids	Britney Gomez	2 episodes
2017	Good Witch	Larissa	Episode: "In Sickness and in Health"
2018	Creeped Out	Gudge	2 episodes
2019	Wayne	Betty	Episode: "Del"
2019	Designated Survivor	Mariluz Santiago	Episode: "#whocares"
2019	Titans	Barista	Episode: "Faux-Hawk"
2019	V Wars	Chloe	Episode: "The Night Is Darkening Round Me"
2020	The Boys	Hostess	Episode: "Proper Preparation and Planning"
2020–2023	The Hardy Boys	Callie Shaw	23 episodes
