= The Hardy Boys (2020 TV series) =

Canadian mystery drama television series

- The Hardy Boys Cover Art
- Genre: Mystery; Drama; Supernatural horror
- Based on: The Hardy Boys by Edward Stratemeyer
- Developed by: Steve Cochrane; Jason Stone
- Starring: Rohan Campbell; Alexander Elliot; James Tupper; Anthony Lemke; Keana Lyn; Linda Thorson; Bea Santos; Adam Swain; Cristian Perri; Atticus Mitchell; Riley O'Donnell; Laara Sadiq
- Composer: Edo Van Breeman
- Countries of origin: Canada; United States
- Original language: English
- No. of seasons: 3
- No. of episodes: 31

Production
- Executive producers: Joan Lambur; Jason Stone; Peter Mohan; Athena Georgaklis; Pam Westman; Doug Murphy
- Cinematography: Fraser Brown
- Editors: Aaron Marshall; Christopher Minns; Ana Yavari; Daniel Sadler; Lauren Brandon; Shelley Therrien
- Production companies: Nelvana; Lambur Productions

Original release
- Network: Hulu (United States); YTV (Canada)
- Release: December 4, 2020 – July 26, 2023

The Hardy Boys is a mystery drama television series, based on The Hardy Boys book series created by Edward Stratemeyer. It was produced by Nelvana and Lambur Productions. The series stars Rohan Campbell, Alexander Elliot, James Tupper, Anthony Lemke, Keana Lyn, Riley O'Donnell, Bea Santos, Adam Swain and Cristian Perri as the main characters. Filming took place mainly in Ontario, Canada, with featured locations including Cambridge, Port Hope, and Hamilton.

The first season was released on Hulu on December 4, 2020. The second season was released on April 6, 2022. The third and final season was released on July 26, 2023.

== Premise ==
The Hardy Boys follows two brothers, Frank and Joe Hardy, alongside their friends and father, trying to disclose the truth about something quite menacing happening right in their own town of Bridgeport.

== Cast and characters ==
=== Main ===
- Rohan Campbell as Frank Hardy
- Alexander Elliot as Joe Hardy
- James Tupper (season 1) and Anthony Lemke (seasons 2 & 3) as Fenton Hardy
- Keana Lyn Bastidas as Callie Shaw
- Linda Thorson as Gloria Estabrook
- Bea Santos as Aunt Trudy
- Adam Swain as Chet Morton
- Cristian Perri as Phil Cohen
- Atticus Mitchell as JB Cox
- Riley O'Donnell as Elizabeth "Biff" Hooper
- Jennifer Hsiung (season 1) and Alli Chung (seasons 2 & 3) as Jesse Hooper
- Krista Nazaire as Belinda Conrad (seasons 2 & 3)
- Sadie Munroe as Lucy Wayne (season 2)
- Leonidas Castrounis as Dennis Gilroy (season 2)
- Laara Sadiq as Kanika Khan (seasons 1 & 3)
- Ari Cohen as Hurd Sparewell (season 3)
- Bailee Madison as Drew "Darrow"/Sparewell (season 3)

=== Recurring ===
- Janet Porter as Laura Hardy
- Stephen R. Hart as The Tall Man (season 1)
- Saad Siddiqui as Rupert Khan
- Rachel Drance as Stacy Baker/Anastasia Nabokov (seasons 1 & 3)
- Tara Yelland as Olivia “Kowalski”/Sparewell (seasons 2 & 3)
- Frank Licari as Paul McFarlane
- Bill Lake as Ezra Collig
- Philip Williams as Wilt
- Ric Garcia as Stefan
- Charolette Lai as Sandra
- Jim Codrington as Sam Peterson
- Sean Patrick Dolan as Ern Cullmore
- Tara Paterson as Shawna Meyer
- Joan Gregson as Anya Kowalski
- Mark Sparks as Nigel
- Philip Craig as George Estabrook
- Marvin Kaye as Sergei Nabokov
- Vijay Mehta as Ahmed Kahn
- Milton Barnes as Brian Conrad (seasons 2 & 3)
- Jake Epstein as Adrian & Aaron Munder (seasons 2 & 3)

== Episodes ==
=== Series overview ===
| Season | Episodes | Originally released |
|---|---|---|
| 1 | 13 | December 4, 2020 |
| 2 | 10 | April 6, 2022 |
| 3 | 8 | July 26, 2023 |

=== Season 1 (2020) ===
| No. overall | No. in season | Title | Directed by | Written by | Original release date |
|---|---|---|---|---|---|
| 1 | 1 | "Welcome to Your Life" | Jason Stone | Steve Cochrane | December 4, 2020 March 5, 2021 (CAN) |
After a fishing boat is raided and a lockbox containing a radioactive Egyptian idol is stolen, a mysterious man kills the captain and crew of the boat, with only a sailor named Ern surviving. Joe and Frank's father, Fenton, begins his day normally by investigating a corrupt construction site worker. Meanwhile, Joe and Frank's mother, Laura, notices that she's being followed on her way to Frank's baseball game. After winning the game, Joe and Frank are met by a police officer who informs them that Laura is dead. Fenton arrives at the house when the kids are mourning their mother, and tells them that they will be moving to Bridgeport for the Summer with him. Though outraged, the group moves in with their Aunt Trudy. Later that day, they meet a girl who takes them to a diner and tells them her name is Biff, short for Elizabeth. She and Joe kindle a friendship, but Ern arrives at a welcome party and informs Gloria of the disaster, then accidentally scares the woman away. Then, the brothers spy on their father, who is being confronted by a strange woman, who says that her nephew said something to Laura that was the reason she died.
| 2 | 2 | "Where the Light Can't Find You" | Jason Stone | Jason Stone | December 4, 2020 March 12, 2021 (CAN) |
On a plane, one man jumps to the ground with another man's bag, taking whatever was inside with him. Back in Bridgeport, Fenton does not want Frank and Joe to investigate Ern, who ran off the previous night. However, the boys start to dig deeper into the mysterious, and Fenton leaves for the airport to investigate a case. After seeing Biff come into the store looking strange, he follows her into the woods and sees her delivering supplies to the man who jumped out of the plane. Fenton finds Laura's connection to the missing person but is attacked, though he escapes. The man Joe found gets a radio and pinpoints a location in town. His leg is injured so he sends Joe and Biff out to deliver a message. Frank and Callie visit a hotel for information, and Joe opens the letter to see what's inside. He reseals and delivers the letter, and the team finds Ern is in the basement. The tall man whose bag was stolen and raided the fishing boat, arrives to find Ern. Joe figures out who the man who jumped out of the plane is, but the guy warns Joe to stay away. At dinner, Trudy demands to know where the boys were all day. The boys find Laura's case notes.
| 3 | 3 | "Of Freedom and Pleasure" | Jason Stone | Sandra Chwialkowska | December 4, 2020 March 19, 2021 (CAN) |
Frank finds a book from the Bridgeport library that was last checked out by his mother. However, it has a chapter missing, and Frank tells Phil and Callie about the mystery. Meanwhile, Joe accidentally breaks the artifact and discovers a little piece of metal inside it. He attends the annual carnival with Biff, who warns him about spending money to play rigged games. However, he wins every game and claims a variety of prizes. The man from the plane sneaks into Trudy's house for the idol but the Tall Man arrives, interrupting his search. Frank and his friends find the psychic who wrote the missing book chapter, but she is reclusive and does not want to talk to them. At the carnival, they see a lousy performance about how the psychic's father died when he saw a demon and go straight back to her to find out more. Frank and the psychic, Anna relate to their parents' deaths and grow closer. The Tall Man realizes that Joe took the radioactive metal bolt from the idol and searches the carnival. He chases Joe, who grows afraid until the man from the plane shows up and electrocutes the Tall Man. Anna tells Frank that her father didn't find a demon, but actually a box—the same one that Ern found during his time on the Astghik.
| 4 | 4 | "Secrets and Lies" | Jeff Renfroe | Avrum Jacobson | December 4, 2020 March 26, 2021 (CAN) |
The police—including Jesse—investigate the man from the plane's campsite. They collect evidence, and Joe spies on them. However, he is caught by Biff, and he tells her that he worries that Jesse might find his name on one of the tools he lent the Plane Man and he will be arrested too. Meanwhile, Frank calls his girlfriend Emma to tell her that he thinks it would be best if they take some time off due to him being in Bridgeport, but she breaks up with him instead. A crestfallen Frank then goes to the library to investigate the book his mother checked out prior to her death and learns that when she came in for the book she had coffee, so Frank goes to Wilt's to investigate further. Wilt tells him that Laura was upset about "joining the family business." Meanwhile, the Tall Man remains alive at the hospital. Frank talks to Gloria, who said she and Laura had an argument about Frank's schooling the day she died, and Joe and Biff sneak into the police station and reclaim the toolbox, however in the process they learn that the police know more about Plane Man than they thought. Upon their return, Joe and Frank share their discoveries, and Trudy, worried sick, sets more boundaries with them. Later, Biff arrives with more menacing news about Plane Man and the Tall Man escapes the hospital.
| 5 | 5 | "The Drop" | Jeff Renfroe | Mike Kiss | December 4, 2020 April 2, 2021 (CAN) |
Frank meets with Fenton's partner, Sam, to investigate J.B. Cox, the man from the plane, and learns that he is actually a thief for hire. Joe tries to decipher a message left by Cox while Trudy worries about Fenton. They realize that the words on the paper they have are all flowers, and they realize further that Cox and his buyer will be meeting at the Matthew Brothers warehouse, that closed years ago. Joe and Frank investigate the warehouse, and when The Tall Man arrives, they barely escape with their lives, but run into Cox, who warns them to stay away from the case. While Trudy and Gloria share their grievances about the brothers and Laura, Joe creates a fake version of the object in the idol to lure The Tall Man away. The Tall Man follows them to an isolated farm. The gang traps The Tall Man in a makeshift cage and calls the police. Jesse brings the boys home to Aunt Trudy and explains what they did, to Trudy’s sick and amazement. Jesse attempts to interrogate the Tall Man but he doesn’t reveal a thing.
| 6 | 6 | "In Plain Sight" | Jeff Renfroe | Jennifer Daley | December 4, 2020 April 9, 2021 (CAN) |
Fenton Hardy is following a lead to a country estate but is captured by a group that is also looking for Kanika Khan’s nephew. Fenton manages to escape…barely. Joe and Biff go to the town tailor, Tan Lively, and discover that the fabric came from a police-type overcoat. Frank and Callie take the entrance exam to Rosegrave college and are the final two who qualify to take the last test. It’s an escape room challenge. Time is running out when Frank figures out it’s a musical clue and opens a secret door in the study. Inside the room, they find a locked door with the symbol that Laura drew. Now they know that their grandmother is involved in what’s happening somehow. The Tall Man comes after Joe and Biff again on the street. They manage to elude him by running into a theater. Joe hides the artifact in the theater behind the big screen. Kanika comes to visit Gloria and it’s revealed the Tall Man is working for her. Gloria warns her not to harm another member of her family. Joe tells Frank about the Tall Man and that the fabric came from a police coat. Frank tells Joe that he saw the symbol in the secret room at Gloria’s house. They discover Rosegrave’s Dean McFarland was their mother’s old boyfriend. Fenton finally calls and the boys reveal what they’ve found out. Fenton tells them to stay out of it and stay safe, but the boys have no intention of doing it. The Chief of Police, Ezra Collig, comes to report to Gloria meaning he’s working for her.
| 7 | 7 | "A Figure in Hiding" | Melanie Orr | Sabrina Sherif | December 4, 2020 April 16, 2021 (CAN) |
The Tall Man's buyer phones him, threatening him if he fails to retrieve the artifact. Chet offers to drive Frank and Callie to Rosegrave so they can meet with the dean. Joe and Phil trick Trudy into letting Joe attend a Sea Cadets meeting, but Joe secretly meets up with Biff. Jesse visits Trudy, who shares how Gloria is going to help Trudy promote her artwork. Kanika phones the Tall Man, offering to buy the artifact and make it worth his while. Later, she ponders who else currently employs him. At Rosegrave, Frank and Callie interrogate Dean McFarland about his high school romance with Laura. Stavros, one of the school's top students, takes them on an expanded tour of campus. Frank is turned off by Stavros's elitist attitude; they ditch him to break into McFarland's office where Frank discovers McFarland had a past rendezvous scheduled with Laura. McFarland catches Frank snooping and covertly slips Frank a note asking him to meet up privately at the school's greenhouse. Once there, he reveals to Frank that Laura met with him shortly before her murder so they could reconcile. McFarland tells Frank that Laura was planning to expose Bridgeport's secret society of power brokers. At Collig's house, Joe and Biff discover a jacket matching the fabric sample of the warehouse intruder. Frank confides in Callie that Rosegrave appears to be a breeding ground for organized corruption. Biff pleads with Joe to tell Collig's secret to Jesse, but Joe wants to wait until they can gather stronger evidence. Joe tells Phil about what he and Biff found, and swears Phil to secrecy. The next day, Frank returns to Rosegrave only to learn that McFarland has resigned and fled town. Frank returns to the greenhouse where he finds a cryptic note the dean left behind for him. Back in Bridgeport, the Tall Man ambushes Frank and Joe out on the street; they evade him, and the Tall Man is hit by a car.
| 8 | 8 | "What Happened in Bridgeport" | Melanie Orr | Jay Vaidya | December 4, 2020 April 23, 2021 (CAN) |
Frank tries to calm down Stacy Baker, the teenage girl who accidentally hit the Tall Man with her car. Stacy is taken into custody for killing the Tall Man. At the police station, Collig probes the boys for what they know about the Tall Man. Joe hints to Collig that he suspects the Tall Man's escape from jail was an inside job. Trudy arrives to collect the boys, and Collig warns her to keep a tight leash on them. Cox's buyer ambushes him at his motel room, explaining that Cox won't get paid until he brings them the contents of the idol. Biff, Chet, Phil, and Callie invite Frank and Joe to partake in their traditional back-to-school binge of ice cream and brownies at Wilt's Deli. Back home, Joe discovers his bedroom has been ransacked. On the boys' first day of school in Bridgeport, Frank learns Stacy is a new student there, too. During their science class, Biff admits to Joe that she confessed to Jesse about their suspicions of Collig. Frank tries to find out more about McFarland from his teacher, Ms. Diaz, who was classmates with McFarland and Laura; but she dodges his questions. Stacy has lunch with Frank, Callie, and Chet. At the deli, Cox blindsides Joe and admits he's the one who broke into Joe's bedroom. Joe denies having the idol, but Cox knows he's lying and promises to get Joe more information about Laura's murder. Frank and Joe hatch a plan to rope Jesse into entrapping both Cox and Collig. Jesse confides in Trudy that she believes Biff's suspicions about Collig. Trudy snoops in each of the boys' bedrooms. Frank approaches Ms. Diaz again, and she recounts how Laura had tried to publish an article (ultimately censored by Bridgeport's faculty) about her suspicions of corruption. Cox finds out that Gloria is a benefactor to Rosegrave, so he manipulates Joe into accompanying him to meet his employers. Frank searches the school newspaper archive and locates Laura's unpublished article. Trudy uncovers the boys' crime board up in her attic. Frank goes to Gloria's house to confront her, but he sees that Cox has brought Joe there as leverage.
| 9 | 9 | "The Key" | Melanie Orr | Ken Cuperos | December 4, 2020 April 30, 2021 (CAN) |
Cox identifies himself to Gloria and informs her he's the retriever whom she'd blindly hired to swipe the golden artifact. He demands payment from her, but Stefan knocks him unconscious. Frank rails against Gloria for keeping secrets from them and that's why he believes the idol's contents got Laura murdered. Gloria is horrified to learn from the boys that her daughter was most likely the victim of foul play. Phil and Biff tell Jesse about Joe's abduction. Gloria tells Collig that the boys learned information of which she'd been unaware, ordering Collig to send Cox out on a new retrieval mission. Jesse tells Trudy about Joe's abduction. Gloria confesses to the boys that their great-grandfather, George, was in a mine cave-in along with Ahmed Khan and Sergei Nabikov; the idol is its surviving artifact that gives people prescience. The three families came together to form The Circle of the Eye for the purposes of wielding its mystical powers for their personal gain. When Laura had found out about The Circle, she'd rejected the Estabrook family's wealth. George had then split the idol into three pieces, and one of them was in the plane crash in which he'd died. Gloria admits that George left a repository in the family's manor with a self-destruct mechanism that only the key can bypass. At home, Trudy confronts the boys about their crime board. When Frank and Joe tell Trudy about Laura's murder along with how Collig is working for Gloria, their aunt agrees to help the boys if they share with her any new evidence they uncover. Collig extorts Cox into retrieving the artifact on Gloria's behalf. Fenton saves Rupert Khan from his captors, and Rupert reveals he had been helping Laura attempt to destroy The Circle. At school, Callie regards Stacy with suspicion; but Chet thinks Callie is jealous of Frank's crush on Stacy. Joe tells Biff about the repository and that he's considering giving the lucky charm from the artifact to Gloria. Cox breaks into the Khans' hotel suite and swipes Kanika's portion of the artifact. Gloria asks Kanika if she knows where Rupert is, but Kanika admits her nephew has disappeared and she wonders if his captor is the same person who stole both her and Gloria's portions ("the Eye") of the idol. Rupert admits to Fenton that he was working with Laura to expose The Circle, but somebody shoots at them from afar. Joe admits to Gloria that he hid the idol in the theater, and Gloria sends Stefan to accompany Frank and Joe to the theater so they can retrieve it. Joe returns to the lucky charm's hiding place but discovers it is missing. Back at home, Frank and Joe take apart the music box Gloria gave to them, in which they find what they think must be the key to the repository. Sneaking back into the Estabrook manor, the boys successfully unlock the repository door.
| 10 | 10 | "The Secret Room" | Casey Walker | Avrom Jacobson | December 4, 2020 May 7, 2021 (CAN) |
Joe and Frank explore the repository, and they realize George had intended for Laura to find the key since he'd hid it in Laura's music box. They read George's journal in which he'd written about using the Eye to foresee the end of the world. Callie tails Stacy home after school and sees Stacy's aunt and uncle apparently doing her homework for her. At the deli, Joe makes Biff reveal that she'd swiped and hid the Eye, but he asks her not to tell him where it is. George had written in his journal how Ahmed had told him about the Eye having shown Ahmed an apparition of Ahmed's deceased brother. In his motel room, Cox tests out the Eye he'd stolen from Kanika as it helps him predict Solitaire cards. Back at the deli, Cox tells Joe he is in possession of one of the Eyes; but Joe pleads with Cox to stop searching for the other two pieces. Stacy confronts Callie about a phone call Callie had made to Stacy's house under false pretenses; but Callie fibs and claims she was only doing it in an attempt to apologize. Frank confides in Callie that Stacy's behavior indeed seems shady, so they go to her house to spy; they both witness Stacy assaulting her uncle. Chet breaks up with Callie because he feels she's infatuated with Frank. Up in Trudy's attic, Joe proposes to Frank that they destroy the Eye since George had feared it so much. The boys have an intense argument over what the consequences might be. Stacy and Frank meet up at the deli, and Frank confronts Stacy about her true identity. Stacy admits her real name is Anastasia Nabikov; she's the daughter of Victor, who was Sergei's son. Stacy suspects her dad was murdered by the same members of The Circle who killed Frank's mom. Callie walks by the deli and catches Stacy and Frank in an impetuous kiss. Biff brings Joe to the school's boiler room where she'd hid the Eye. Chet finds Frank working his deli shift and tells Frank about his breakup with Callie. Frank interrogates Gloria about Victor's death, and she tells her grandson she wants him to wield the power of the Eye. Jesse searches for the missing Biff at Trudy's house. Joe and Biff venture to Demon's Paw where Joe follows the Eye's magnetic pull. The two of them suddenly fall through what appears to be a sinkhole — and disappear below ground.
| 11 | 11 | "No Getting Out" | Casey Walker | Mike Kiss | December 4, 2020 May 14, 2021 (CAN) |
Joe and Biff fall into a mine shaft. Jesse and Trudy argue over who is at fault for Joe and Biff having gone missing, but Frank checks the crime board and realizes that Joe must have headed to Demon's Paw. A search party is dispatched to the old mines. Frank shows Gloria the key to George's repository and leads her into her father's secret room. At his motel, Cox taps into the Eye's prescience to prevent Stefan from ambushing him. Frank brings Gloria to Anya Kowalski, who confronts Gloria about George's sins but still agrees to help them find Joe and Biff. Anya tells Frank and Gloria that George, Ahmed, and Sergei each wanted their own separate entrance into the mines. Down in the mine shaft, Biff and Joe realize they are both at fault; they discover a crawl space leading into the main tunnels. Frank visits Stacy, asking her to help him find Sergei's entrance. Joe's Eye leads him and Biff to a skeleton. Frank and Callie follow Stacy's directions to access Sergei's sealed entrance from inside an old storehouse. Joe rifles through the skeleton's belongings, but Biff insists they backtrack. Before Joe sets out on his own, Biff reveals to Joe that Jesse had secretly adopted her. Frank manages to reach Joe on Biff's walkie; he realizes Joe is right underneath the storehouse. Joe tells Frank he's going to search for Biff and bring her to their contact point. Incognito, Cox visits Wilt at the deli, pretending to be a newcomer moving to Bridgeport. Wilt dishes on all of the recent gossip, including the arrival of Stacy's family in town. Joe locates Biff and brings her back to the sealed door. Callie arrives with Jesse just as Joe picks the door's lock. Jesse demands to know what's going on, and they take her back to Trudy's house to see their crime board. Gloria digs through her father's repository, and Stefan tells her Cox wants the other Eyes. Cox breaks into Stacy's house, but he's subdued by her bodyguards. Stacy reveals she's in possession of another Eye.
| 12 | 12 | "Eye to Eye" | Jason Stone | James Hurst | December 4, 2020 May 21, 2021 (CAN) |
In a flashback to 1961: George flees from the Estabrooks' manor while telling Gloria he's protecting her from The Circle. Back in the present: Frank tells Joe he has had a change of heart and they need to gain all three Eyes to destroy them. He proposes giving Gloria the Eye so he can go undercover and gain access to the chamber. Trudy tells Frank she knows he and Joe have the Eye and she wants it out of the house. Cox comes to Gloria and tells her Stacy robbed him of his Eye and now has two of them. She tasks him with stealing Joe's Eye. At the deli, Callie tries to warn Frank that Stacy is manipulating him. Fenton helps Rupert go into hiding. Cox visits Joe just as Fenton arrives back home and reunites with his sons. Trudy catches Cox in Joe's bedroom, but Cox manages to escape before Fenton can confront him. Frank and Joe update their dad on everything that happened while he was away. Fenton demands Joe bring him the Eye, but Joe discovers Cox stole it from his bedroom. Rupert phones Fenton, informing him he's been compromised. Fenton reprimands Frank, Joe, and Trudy for getting involved with The Circle. Fenton and Rupert confront Kanika with accusations that she denies. Kanika gives Fenton a voice recording of George that she had stolen from Laura. Cox brings Joe's Eye to Gloria, but Frank interrupts their transaction. Gloria dismisses Cox, and she lays a guilt trip on Frank. Beginning his ruse, Frank tells Gloria he wants to help protect the family from their enemies. Frank listens to George's voice recording to Laura. In another flashback: Ahmed and Sergei create an interfamilial détente with Gloria. Back in the present: George's recorded voice warns Laura never to let the Eyes get reassembled. Gloria summons Stacy and Kanika to meet with her and Frank; they argue over George's and Victor's respective deaths as well as the various thefts of the three Eyes. Gloria proposes a truce between the three families, but Stacy and Kanika can trust neither Gloria nor one another. Stacy storms out; Frank goes after her, and Stacy tries to seduce him into helping her acquire all three Eyes for the two of them to wield jointly. Fenton arrives at the manor to bring Frank home, but Frank announces he's coming to live with Gloria. Stacy rendezvouses with Callie to give her a cryptic warning. As Callie tries to leave, Stacy and her bodyguards abduct Callie.
| 13 | 13 | "While the Clock Ticked" | Jason Stone | Sabrina Sherif | December 4, 2020 May 28, 2021 (CAN) |
Stacy phones Trudy's house, and Joe answers. She tells him to relay to Frank that she has kidnapped Callie and will make an exchange for the Eye. Joe tries to explain that Cox stole his portion of the Eye, but Stacy doesn't believe him. Frank and Gloria are discussing the morality of possessing the Eye when Joe rushes in and tells them about Callie's kidnapping. Gloria plots how they can gain the advantage over Stacy, but Frank and Joe want to prioritize rescuing Callie. While Frank and Gloria argue about it, Joe discretely knabs the fake piece of the Eye. At home, Joe reveals to Frank what he'd swiped. Kanika makes a deal with Fenton to leave town in exchange for amnesty from prosecution. Collig comes looking for Frank, telling Trudy that Frank is the prime suspect in Callie's disappearance. Frank overhears this and flees from the house, taking refuge at Wilt's Deli. As the gang rallies around Frank and Joe, Phil suggests they cloak the fake piece of the Eye in americium to trick Stacy. Fenton arrives home and forces Collig to admit that Gloria is trying to contain Frank. At the warehouse, Frank and Chet exchange the fake Eye for Callie's safety. Frank and Trudy argue about which of them is actually looking out for the boys' best interest. At the manor, Phil distracts Stefan while Joe and Biff sneak in to retrieve the real Eye piece. Meanwhile, Stacy realizes the piece Frank gave to her is a decoy. Biff locates the map to the destruction chamber. Joe and Biff hear Gloria returning to her study, so they hide; in short order, they overhear Gloria telling Stefan that she and Stacy have reluctantly formed a temporary partnership after Stacy realized Frank had set her up. Biff accidentally gets locked in the repository, and she guides Joe and Phil to the air vent. They maneuver the key through the vents in order to free Biff. Gloria and Stacy arrive in the Chamber of the Eye; Frank, Joe, Callie, and Fenton interrupt them before they can connect the three pieces. A fight ensues, but Joe falls just short of stopping his grandmother from connecting all three pieces. Frank reaches for the fully-reassembled Eye, and his body becomes infused with the Eye's full power — which causes an explosion. Everyone gradually regains consciousness, except for Frank...who endures an astral flashback of the final hours of Laura's life. Upon awakening, Frank accuses Gloria of being complicit in The Circle's pursuit of his mother. Stefan accidentally implicates himself as having been Laura's killer. Gloria is horrified to learn of Stefan's betrayal. As the chamber collapses, Callie pursues a fleeing Stacy. Frank, Joe, Gloria, and Fenton escape as the chamber implodes — killing Stefan while the Eye seems to be buried by the rubble. Jesse arrives to arrest Gloria for Victor's murder. Days later, Fenton tells Trudy that he and the boys are staying in Bridgeport; Fenton will apply for the indicted Collig's job as Chief of Police. Callie tells the gang about how Stacy and her bodyguards had escaped in their van. Everyone heads off to the deli, except for Frank and Callie; the two young lovers share a kiss. Joe, who'd also stayed behind, pokes fun at Frank after Callie leaves. Joe shows Frank how he has repaired Laura's music box. Before Frank and Joe rejoin the gang over at Wilt's Deli, Joe discovers a note from Cox in his bedroom along with Cox's radio that Cox has left behind for Joe to keep. Back at the mines, a group of armed guards pinpoint and retrieve the relic which had contained the Eye amidst the chamber's wreckage. They assume they are now the ones in possession of the Eye.

=== Season 2 (2022) ===
| No. overall | No. in season | Title | Directed by | Written by | Original release date |
|---|---|---|---|---|---|
| 14 | 1 | "A Disappearance" | Jason Stone | Chris Pozzebon | April 6, 2022 April 4, 2022 (CAN) |
Six months later, the gang heads to a picnic and bonfire sponsored by their school's A/V Club. As night falls, a student named Dennis Gilroy gets abducted in the woods by a mysterious creature. Frank has a nightmare about his late mother, Laura. Joe has been photographing a mysterious blue van around town. Trudy now works as a guidance counselor at Bridgeport High. Gloria phones Fenton from prison. Joe pesters Biff about helping her uncover her biological mother's identity; she isn't interested. Biff tells Joe and Phil that Dennis is missing. Frank and Joe try to get information out of Lucy Wayne, Dennis's girlfriend who was the last one to see him; she rebukes their efforts. Frank, Joe, and Phil break into the A/V Club's storage room so they can watch the footage that Dennis had captured at Demon's Paw; the video camera captured what Phil believes to be "the Bridgeport Demon." At the deli, Chet expresses how he thinks the town's "Demon Week" festivities are built around a hoax. Joe is still worried about Dennis's safety. Up at Skull Mountain, Frank, Joe, Biff, and Phil find a ritual setup of what they assume to be a location shoot for Dennis's film set; some sugary-tasting antifreeze has been left behind. Mack Malone, a representative from Stratemeyer Global, catches the gang there; he warns them that this is private property and they should stay away. Jesse, having been promoted to Sheriff of Bridgeport, leads the search party for Dennis; she reprimands the gang for cutting school and putting themselves in danger. While in detention, Chet befriends a sly new student named Belinda Conrad. At home, Fenton grounds Frank and Joe for the risk they took. At a facility, Malone supervises a research team; they are keeping a hooded figure held captive. Joe wants to go after Dennis again, and he gets into a huge argument with Frank. Defying his father, Joe sneaks out again; he returns to Demon's Paw with Biff and Phil in search of Dennis. At the deli, Callie tells Frank she's worried she won't get financial aid to attend Woodson Prep. Wilt interrupts them, telling Frank how Trudy phoned him to report that Joe snuck out. The gang heads to Demon's Paw, worried that Joe will get poisoned by the gaseous remnants of the cave-in. At Demon's Paw, Joe, Biff, and Phil faint from the gaseous intake. Joe sees a demonic figure towering above him as he falls unconscious; when he wakes up, Joe finds his friends standing over him. Biff and Phil have recovered from the fumes. Frank locates Dennis's hat abandoned in a creek. The gang keeps searching and finds Dennis unconscious in an abandoned millhouse. Back at Stratemeyer's lab, Malone and his employee, Angela Todd, have abducted Cox (no longer wearing the hood). They grill him about the intact Eye they've recovered, which Cox touches. At the hospital, Dennis recovers from his concussion. Frank and Joe are mystified about how they found Dennis in the west woods when the police's eyewitness had seen Dennis disappear into the east woods. Back home, Fenton apologizes to the boys for overreacting. Cox sneaks into Trudy's house to confront Frank and Joe; he tells them how Stratemeyer had abducted him and they are trying to find the real eye since the one they'd shown him (that he touched) must be a facsimile. After Cox leaves, Frank experiences a flash...he doesn't fully realize it yet, but Frank had absorbed all of the Eye's power, lingering in his body for the past six months.
| 15 | 2 | "Conflicting Reports" | Jason Stone | Heather Taylor and Nile Séguin | April 6, 2022 April 11, 2022 (CAN) |
Frank has another astral flashback; this time, he witnesses George, Sergei, and Ahmed arguing about the damage that their Circle is inflicting upon society. The Eye communicates to Frank, taking on the form of an apparition of George, who admits his sins to his great-grandson. This apparition confirms that the Eye cannot be destroyed, although its power can be transferred. The next day, Frank searches George's repository but gets interrupted by Joe, who accuses Frank of hoarding the Eye for himself. Frank comes clean to Joe that he thinks he's absorbed all of the Eye's energy but doesn't have control of his powers. Jesse and Trudy are confirmed to be in a romantic relationship. Phil asks Biff about her birth parents, but she snaps at him. Trudy breaks the news to Callie that Woodson has rescinded its offer of admission to her. During class, Phil observes Dennis scribbling some mysterious etchings in a notebook; he swipes them just as Dennis has an epileptic reaction to their teacher's film projector. At the deli, Frank uses the Eye's power to communicate astrally with the Eye (masquerading as George) while playing an arcade game. The mayor takes a photo-op with Frank and Joe in an attempt to make himself look good by honoring their heroism. Callie finds out from Donald Dukay that Gloria was pulling strings for her at Rosegrave. Biff shares a lead with Joe and Phil; she suspects general store worker Tad Carson was the secret eyewitness who saw Dennis go into the east woods. When Frank, Joe, and Callie confront Tad, he tells them he saw a redheaded girl accompany Dennis into the woods on the night Dennis disappeared. Joe thinks Tad is describing Lucy. Outside the general store, Frank has a flash after touching some antifreeze; his vision indicates that Dennis was locked in a trunk, at one point. Frank and Joe ditch Fenton's wrestlemania viewing party to search for more evidence. Trudy tells Callie she may have been blacklisted by all of the local prep schools. Frank and Joe are cornered while exploring a shack in the woods, and they narrowly escape being killed in an act of arson. Belinda ropes Chet into trespassing on private property, and the two of them are almost caught. Back home, Frank discovers that members of The Circle were codebreakers who'd encrypted many of their notes. Callie schedules a visit to see Gloria at the prison.
| 16 | 3 | "The Missing Camera" | James Genn | Madeline Lamubour and Laura Seaton | April 6, 2022 April 18, 2022 (CAN) |
Fenton wakes up Frank from an Eye-induced bad dream, and he tells Frank and Joe he's selling their old house. As Frank and Joe head toward Wilt's Deli, two students dressed as demons pelt Frank and Joe with paint-filled balloons. Wilt shows the boys how the deli has been vandalized. Local recluse Tom Elroy comes into the deli to pick up an order, and Frank recognizes his boots from the shack. Frank and Chet stake out the Elroy farm where Frank gets another flash that leads them to a tarp-covered blue car. Joe, Biff, and Phil help Dennis and Lucy complete Dennis's film, but it's really a pretense for Joe to attempt to jog Dennis's memories of his abduction. Tom appears and chases them, railing against Dennis. The kids lose Tom, but Lucy protects Dennis from being further interrogated by Joe. Frank and Chet share with the gang a receipt they'd found in Tom's trash; it's for a power chord compatible with Dennis's missing video camera. They return to the Elroy farm so Frank can steal the videotape from Tom's farmhouse, but Frank finds the video camera is empty. Meanwhile, Callie visits Gloria in prison; Gloria confirms she was grooming Callie to enter Rosegrave because Gloria knew Callie would be loyal to her. Gloria agrees to help Callie get back into Rosegrave if Callie manipulates Frank into visiting her. Chet, joined by Belinda, continues to struggle with distracting Tom in order to buy Frank some more searching time. Joe, Biff, and Phil question Trudy about "the demon queen," Abigail Owens — who they suspect is Biff's birth mom. Tom catches Frank trespassing in his house, but Chet and Belinda burst in behind him to provide Frank with backup. Tom discloses that somebody else burned down his shack, the blue car hasn't worked properly in years, and he was a war hero. The boots Frank had observed were standard-issue footwear that could have belonged to anyone. More students in demon masks show up to harass Tom with fireworks, but Belinda turns Tom's dog loose on them to chase the punks away. Grateful, Tom gives Frank the damaged video camera that Tom had found abandoned on the night Dennis was taken. Lucy comes to the Hardys' house to tell the gang that Dennis has gone missing again; Joe, Biff, and Phil accompany her to the school, where they find Dennis catatonic. As Dennis is whisked away to the hospital, Lucy rebuffs Joe's attempts to help her investigate. Cox has bugged the Hardys' attic and eavesdrops on Frank and Joe talking about the Eye.
| 17 | 4 | "A Clue on Film" | James Genn | Sabrina Sherif | April 6, 2022 April 25, 2022 (CAN) |
Frank wakes up from another nightmare. Callie visits Frank at his bedroom window, but Fenton interrupts them and insists on driving Callie home. Jesse updates Biff on Dennis's comatose status. While driving Callie home, Fenton warns her not to trust Gloria. Chet meets Belinda's father, Brian, who tries to intimidate him. Frank and Joe visit an unconscious Dennis in the hospital, and Dr. Vivian Burelli (Dennis's new psychiatrist) tells them Dennis is trapped in a state of hyperengagement. Malone and Todd break into Cox's motel room and threaten him; he tells them Frank and Joe are harboring the Eye. Over lunch, Brian informs Belinda that he is currently dating. At Gloria's manor, Frank and Joe find a book about guided imagery. Frank has a premonition of intruders in demon costumes breaking in and triggering the kill-switch to George's vault. Malone and Todd track paranormal energy to the Estabrook estate. Lucy gives Dennis's notebook to Joe. After tutoring Biff, Callie finds out that Biff's birth mom was the "demon queen" and that Biff is considering trying to contact her. Belinda's ex-girlfriend, Erica, pays her a visit. At the "Demon Night Massacre" drive-in movie event, Lucy cautiously warms up to Joe. During the movie, Frank catches Cox spying on him; Cox cryptically warns him to stop using the Eye and to leave town for his family's safety. Lucy expresses guilt to Joe that she'd left Dennis alone in the woods after they broke up on the night of Dennis's disappearance. Callie confesses to Frank that she met with Gloria. Joe gets attacked at Mr. Munder's camera shop by an intruder in a demon costume. Phil shows Biff an etching of a lightning bolt he found in Dennis's notebook. Brian introduces Belinda to his new girlfriend — Angela Todd of Stratemeyer Global. Frank, Joe, and Callie watch the recovered filmstrip from Dennis's videotape that Callie had spliced back together; they decipher that Dennis had caught somebody making a homemade bomb in preparation for an attack,
| 18 | 5 | "Heading for Destruction" | Melanie Scrofano | Chris Pozzebon | April 6, 2022 May 2, 2022 (CAN) |
At the marina, Fenton discovers McFarlane has poisoned himself; Fenton then gets hijacked at gunpoint by a mysterious woman who commands him to drive them to Dixon City. Still examining the spliced filmstrip, Frank, Joe, and Callie identify the bomber as having a letter jacket from the Bridgeport High track team. Trudy makes them bring the evidence to Jesse at the police station, where Tom Elroy has already been detained as the prime suspect. Frank has another flash in which George's apparition tells him Tom is being framed by the real bomber. At the deli, Frank, Joe, Callie, and Biff theorize that the actual bomber framed Tom and is planning to strike at the Demon Day fireworks party that night. Mayor Krassner refuses to shut down the festivities. Tom tells Frank and Jesse about an intruder on his property, whom Frank suspects was Cox. The gang convenes, and Phil shows everyone the lightning bolt; Biff suspects Lucy. Frank and Joe find Todd waiting for them at Cox's motel room; a van pulls up, and Stratemeyer's lackeys kidnap them. Meanwhile, Fenton's abductor tells him she's trying to track down The Circle just like he is. At Stratemeyer Global, Todd demands Frank and Joe give them the Eye; she needs them to activate it, confirming that Stratemeyer hired Cox to search for it on Tom's farm. While videotaping the pre-fireworks Demon Day parade preparations, Phil finds the antifreeze from Dennis's disappearance site...but another costumed demon creeps up on him. Callie, Biff, Chet, and Belinda narrow down the suspect list to Donald Dukay, who implicates his girlfriend Vanessa Bender. After stealing an item in Dixon City, Fenton's captor reveals herself as Olivia Kowalski: her mother is Anya, the town's fortune teller. The gang tells Trudy about Vanessa's plan to detonate the bomb in front of Wilt's Deli. Chet figures out the bomb is hidden in one of the deli's arcade games; the vandalism of the deli had been a ruse so Vanessa's friends could plant the bomb there. Trudy and Biff restrain Vanessa during the parade, but Vanessa cackles about how they're too late. Lola Burton, Vanessa's friend who'd abducted Phil, then detonates the bomb. Back at Stratemeyer Global, Frank has a flash while Todd is in the room, setting off their energy detector. But at the same moment, word arrives about the bombing in town. Todd releases Frank and Joe to avoid drawing the authorities there. Callie runs into the deli, where Deputy Con Riley finds that Jesse has survived the blast but was knocked unconscious. Frank, Joe, Chet, and Belinda chase down Lola and detain her; she reveals that someone hired her and Vanessa and their friends to scare Dennis. Biff and Trudy hold vigil by Jesse's hospital bedside. Chet and Belinda kiss. Frank apologies to Callie for overreacting when she'd told him about her visit to Gloria. Frank has a premonition related to the demonic costumed figures responsible for Dennis's disappearance — they're planning something far worse!
| 19 | 6 | "Hunting an Intruder" | Melanie Scrofano | Chris Pozzebon | April 6, 2022 May 9, 2022 (CAN) |
Fenton arrives back in Bridgeport, realizing his sons are unharmed from the bombing. Joe tells Fenton they don't trust Mayor Krassner, and Fenton admits to them he has been secretly working with Gloria. Malone and Todd overhear Fenton's revelation via security cameras. Back at home, Fenton explains to the boys how "selling their house" was just a cover story — Gloria is actually pulling strings by controlling Stratemeyer's cash flow. But somebody within the Stratemeyer network has apparently gone rogue. He reveals Olivia's role in the espionage. Frank and Joe are worried that Olivia will snuff out Laura's killer before the culprit can be brought to justice. Todd subtly tries to hint to Belinda and Chet that they shouldn't be hanging around Frank and Joe. Callie suspects the alarm company next to Wilt's Deli was the bombers' true target. Trudy tries to bond with Biff, who is less than thrilled about coming to temporarily live with the Hardys. Phil offers to use his cartography skills to map the coordinates of the Stratemeyer signal that Frank memorized, and the gang traces it to Gloria's manor. Joe and Lucy share a bike ride to the lighthouse. The gang heads to the manor, where Frank has flashbacks of the intruder's steps along with a crystal hidden in the chandelier. Malone and Todd enter the manor, and the gang hides in the vault as Malone and Todd try to track down the Eye. Belinda recognizes Todd's voice as belonging to the woman who is dating Brian. After the agents leave Gloria's study, the gang escapes out the window — except for Phil, who doesn't make it out in time. Todd corners Phil, revealing that she knows a lot about him. Outside, Frank has more flashes; Malone and Todd track the boys' movements as Frank and Joe flee through the woods. Frank astrals back in time where he communicates nonverbally with George, who has just excavated the missing crystal from Gloria's chandelier. Frank's energy matrix causes an explosion of rocks from the ground, which knocks the boys off their feet. Todd and Malone discover that the Eye's energy signal corresponds with Frank's heat signature; Todd knocks Malone unconscious so she can keep the information for herself. Back home, Phil identifies the rock Frank and Joe had collected as lightning glass. Frank confides in his friends that, last autumn, he'd absorbed all of the Eye's energy. Joe resents Frank for telling everyone their secret without the two of them talking about it first. Chet forces Belinda to consider the possibility that Brian might be involved with Stratemeyer's dirty dealings as well. Biff admits to Trudy that she's sad and scared about Jesse's condition, and Trudy reveals to Biff that she's in a relationship with Jesse. Joe tries to radio Cox for help, to no avail. Frank has another astral flashback, making contact with George before being thrown back to the present. Another apparition ominously warns Frank to stay focused and not let himself get distracted.
| 20 | 7 | "The Doctor's Orders" | Melanie Orr | Nile Seguin | April 6, 2022 May 16, 2022 (CAN) |
In another of Frank's visions, the younger apparition of George reveals he is merely a projection of the Eye. Frank and Callie visit Gloria in prison; they tell her the interruption in the town's alarm services gave the intruder an opening to steal the crystal from the manor. Gloria panics and has a stroke, implicating Dr. Burelli as she loses consciousness. Belinda grills Brian about his relationship with Todd. Frank phones Joe, tasking him with keeping tabs on Dennis. At the deli, Todd confronts Belinda and Chet; they arrange a meeting based on Todd's lie that she has inventory which may be of interest to Gloria. At the hospital, Joe comforts Lucy because Dennis is being moved by Dr. Burelli to a separate neurological facility in Dixon City. Joe, Lucy, and Phil spy on Dr. Burelli to find out where she's transferring Dennis, but she catches Joe and has him removed by hospital security. Before getting caught, Joe redials a phone number he'd witnessed Burelli dialing, which alerts a distorted-sounding Shadow Man to the fact that Burelli has been compromised. Frank and Callie follow George's apparition to Gloria's study, where they find a secret code hidden in a book authored by Burelli. Belinda and Chet catch Brian and Todd at Stratemeyer's headquarters; Brian is forced to admit to them that he supervises Todd on a secret operative mission. They're trying to stop the Eye from falling into nefarious hands, and Todd reveals she knows Frank is imbued with the Eye's power. Todd stresses that Chet must persuade Frank to expel the Eye's power from his body. Joe, Biff, Phil, and Lucy orchestrate a sting to bust Dennis out of the hospital, but Burelli finds Dennis missing from his room before they can exit the building. While the gang navigates various distractions, Dennis disappears from an elevator. Todd threatens to come between Belinda and Chet if Chet fails to convince Frank to give up the Eye. George's apparition lures Frank into the secret room to show him a flash of Burelli experimenting on children. In the parking garage, Joe spies on Burelli, who is confronted by the Shadow Man...but each of them flees when Joe's radio spontaneously crackles. Lucy finds Dennis sleepwalking on the first floor of the hospital. Belinda confronts Brian, who reveals he's a whistleblower acting as a double agent to spy on Stratemeyer Global. At the Hardys' house, Chet admits to Frank and Callie he's still hurt by how his and Callie's breakup went down. Callie and Frank apologize to him. Up in the attic, Frank and Callie tell the gang they're trying to figure out what Project Midnight is, and Joe thinks it involves using kids as vessels for experiments. Callie theorizes the stained glass Frank saw in his vision means the experiments are being conducted at Rosegrave's chapel. Biff finds the microphone that Cox had planted to bug the Hardys' attic.
| 21 | 8 | "A Midnight Scare" | Melanie Orr | Heather Taylor and Laura Seaton | April 6, 2022 May 23, 2022 (CAN) |
Todd eavesdrops on the gang arguing about what to do regarding the bugged microphone in the Hardys' attic; Chet heads back up to the attic to arrange a rendezvous with Todd. Brian reveals to Belinda the backstory behind Project Midnight, but he believes Burelli is trying to help them expose Stratemeyer. Brian admits to Belinda he wants to destroy the Eye. Chet arranges another meetup with Todd for the next day, but it turns out the gang was utilizing Chet as a double agent. Burelli is found dead, washed up on the shore of the river. Frank warns Joe about the risk of getting caught in Stratemeyer's crosshairs. Mayor Krassner expresses fury to Riley that Burelli's murder will further scandalize the town; he gives her an eyewitness account of the big yellow pickup truck he saw on the night of Burelli's death. Joe and Chet decipher an encoded radio frequency that Cox left behind in Joe's bedroom. Frank and Callie go undercover at Rosegrave, but Cox tails them covertly. He corners them in the library, where Frank has another flash that leads them to a desk that had once belonged to George. Frank has an additional flash in which George's apparition guides him to where a note is hidden in the leg of George's desk, implicating McFarlane. Cox wants to go after McFarlane, but Frank informs Cox that McFarlane was found dead. Cox admits that he himself used to attend Rosegrave, and Frank and Callie accuse Cox of being the Shadow Man. Cox calls security on Frank and Callie, who flee across campus. While hiding from campus security, Frank and Callie find a secret tunnel that leads them to the abandoned Project Midnight lab. Frank has another flash, seeing that Joe is apparently one of the children on whom Project Midnight is experimenting. Callie reveals she got a ten-second glimpse into Frank's vision when she'd touched him. At the deli, Riley tells Chet about how his yellow pickup truck was spotted near the site of Burelli's murder. Todd arrives at the deli to provide Chet with an alibi, and then Todd railroads every attempt by Riley to interrogate Chet. Joe finds Malone bound-and-gagged in the bathroom of Todd's motel room; he forces Malone to give him the address to the pier where Stratemeyer has stashed the empty relic. Todd gives Chet a deadline of one day to deliver Frank to her. Riley arrives at the Conrad residence to question Brian about Chet's truck being parked in their driveway; she informs Brian that he's their prime suspect in Burelli's murder. Todd arrives back at her hotel room; after Malone tells her that Joe paid him a visit, Todd murders Malone. At school, Ms. Kane gives Phil detention for using classtime to decode the cipher; but during detention, teacher Adrian Munder helps Phil crack the code. Lucy visits Joe at home, and he has an epiphany about the remaining bit of Cox's code. Back at Rosegrave, Frank and Callie track down a yearbook identifying the Latin Club member from Frank's vision who'd been referred to as "Patient B" — it was a teenaged Mr. Munder! Frank phones Joe to tell them that Munder is Patient B. Joe and Lucy race down to the school to find Phil alone in detention; Munder has left school for the day. Joe, Phil, and Lucy head over to Munder's house where they find Munder in a catatonic state. They call the ambulance to collect him, and Joe suspects foul play. Cox pays Joe another visit up in the Hardys' attic.
| 22 | 9 | "Captured!" | Jason Stone | Ramona Barckert | April 6, 2022 May 30, 2022 (CAN) |
Joe wants Cox to steal back the relic from Stratemeyer's warehouse vault at the dock. Chet helps Belinda piece together a shredded document that implicates Nurse Marian Cody as being associated with Project Midnight. Callie confides in Joe that she's worried the Eye's energy will destroy Frank from the inside. George's apparition warns Frank not to trust any of his loved ones. Trudy and Biff go to the hospital to visit Jesse, who has awakened from her coma. Fenton phones Detective Richards to tell him Olivia has framed him for murder. Since 911 responders are closing in on Fenton's location, he uses the fire escape to make a getaway. Cox returns to the Hardys' attic to recruit Joe in helping him retrieve the relic, since its vault is on a guarded barge. Frank follows Joe and Cox on their heist and gets caught up in the scheme. Biff admits to Jesse she's been searching for her birth parents. Callie and Belinda lure Marian Cody to Estabrook manor under false pretenses. Trapped in a shipping container, Frank and Joe get into a screaming match about the power the Eye has over Frank, who admits he wants to bring back Laura by harnessing the Eye's energy. Their shipping container gets loaded onto the ship, and Cox breaks them out. Todd intercepts Cox and the Hardys, and she tries to coerce Frank into relinquishing the Eye's power into the relic by threatening Joe's life. Then, Frank wakes up back inside the shipping container with Joe, realizing he'd just had an Eye-induced premonition. Cox breaks them out for real this time. At the manor, Callie and Belinda entrap Nurse Cody to let her know she's in danger. Cody admits to them that Burelli was attempting to transfer consciousnesses from one person to another. Cody went along with it because she was afraid of Burelli, who was out for herself; the experiment on Patient B initially appeared to be successful until it resulted in catatonia, which drove Stratemeyer to shut down the project. But the girls are wrong about one thing: Patient B was, in fact, Adrian Munder's twin brother, Aaron. Chet tells Belinda about his secret deal with Todd, as well as how Frank and Joe have gone to retrieve the relic at the dock. Joe reveals to Cox that Frank absorbed the Eye's power, but Cox doesn't seem to believe them; he bolts. Joe hatches a plan to escape with the relic. Frank and Joe intentionally walk right into Todd's trap, but Brian and Chet show up to interrupt Todd and her lackeys. Amidst the ensuing chaos, Cox grabs the relic and jumps into the water to escape. But it turns out that Joe had swapped the relic with its facsimile, unbeknownst to Cox. Biff leaves a phone message for Abigail Owens, revealing that she thinks she's her birth daughter. Belinda and Callie meet up with Biff and Phil, theorizing that Aaron was Dennis's abductor and also killed Burelli. However, Phil figures out that Aaron isn't the actual culprit. Following Phil's lead, Biff and Belinda accompany him to the hospital to confirm that Adrian Munder had swapped places with Aaron; it was Aaron whom they'd found in a catatonic state at Adrian Munder's house. George's apparition sends Frank a premonition of the Shadow Man attacking Lucy at the school dance. Fenton phones Trudy for help, while Cox hides out in the Hardys' attic. At the school dance, George's apparition leads Frank to Adrian Mundy, who abducts Frank using a chloroform rag.
| 23 | 10 | "An Unexpected Return" | Jason Stone | Chris Pozzebon | April 6, 2022 June 6, 2022 (CAN) |
Chet interrupts an intimate dance between Joe and Lucy to let Joe know that Frank is missing. Biff, Phil, Belinda, and Callie arrive to fill Joe and Chet in on Adrian Munder's duplicity as the Shadow Man. They surmise that Todd must be there because she's tracking the crystal. Joe, Callie, Biff, and Phil return to Munder's house where they find evidence indicating that Munder wants to transfer his twin brother's consciousness into Frank's body. Meanwhile, Munder has brought Frank back to the new laboratory for Project Midnight. Trudy picks up Fenton, who tells her that Olivia is collecting George's scrolls. Chet and Belinda trick Todd into confessing while the police record her; Todd is arrested. Fenton and Trudy track down Olivia and subdue her. In the underground lab, Munder admits his fraternal love for Aaron is stronger than vengeance; he has uploaded Aaron's consciousness into the crystal. Munder's experimentation on Dennis had been a mistake, but his abduction of Frank is intentional. Munder admits he killed Burelli because she was going to expose him, whereas he was able to spare Dennis's life by wiping Dennis's memories clean. Munder extracts Frank's consciousness from his body, transferring it into the crystal. George's apparition shows Frank a flashback of George giving Gloria instructions for hiding the crystal before he dies. George's real consciousness then interacts with Frank's, revealing George's plan to reenter the world via Frank's body. Joe, Chet, Belinda, and Callie invade the lab, restraining Munder in an attempt to interrupt the transfer. Inside the crystal, George's consciousness defeats Frank's consciousness in order to give George access to the transference. The Eye's power creates an energy burst that knocks out everyone in the lab. Munder awakens first, believing Aaron to now be in Frank's body. But it's actually George who is in Frank's body, taunting Munder that he's just a pawn. Munder tries to strangle George, but Chet and Belinda apprehend Munder. Biff and Phil arrive to find George (masquerading as Frank) experiencing sonic distress. Joe demands that George (whom Joe still believes to be Frank) relinquish the Eye's power, and George complies. Fenton tells Olivia he's turning her over to the authorities, but Olivia pleads with him to help her defeat The Circle. George (still masquerading as Frank) thanks Joe for turning the Eye over to Brian. Biff's biological sister, Tess, makes telephone contact with her. George (in Frank's body) breaks up with Callie. Fenton discovers that Laura is still alive. George (in Frank's body) visits Gloria in the prison medical ward, confirming that his long-term plan worked; he now resides in his great-grandson's body. When he demands that Gloria tell him where she hid his scrolls, Gloria flatlines.

=== Season 3 (2023) ===
| No. overall | No. in season | Title | Directed by | Written by | Original release date |
|---|---|---|---|---|---|
| 24 | 1 | "A Strange Inheritance" | Jason Stone | Chris Pozzebon | July 26, 2023 |
After revealing herself to Fenton, Laura smacks his gun out of his hand and knocks him out. In a flashback to the 1960s: George stashes the Eye away on a plane which will eventually crash decades later. George has his scrolls (each one contained in a codex) delivered to Gloria before he consents to having his consciousness uploaded into a crystal. Back in the present day: George (still occupying Frank's body) helps Joe dress for Gloria's funeral. Fenton learns that Olivia, despite confessing to murder, has been freed by higher-ups who've pulled strings on her behalf. Agent Driscoll arrives in town, photographing attendees at Gloria's funeral. Gloria has willed her entire estate to Frank. Callie tells Joe that she is transferring to Rosegrave but she'll still be just a phone call away whenever Joe needs support, even though she and Frank have broken up. They hear the crystal fall over in Gloria's study, and Callie gently puts it away. Stacy shows up at the funeral to approach Frank, but George-as-Frank feels flustered by her presence due to his lack of familiarity with her; believing him to still be Frank, she wants to help him reenter The Circle. Trudy tells Jesse she hid the codexes in the Hardys' laundry room, but George-as-Frank eavesdrops on their conversation. Joe catches George-as-Frank snooping for the scrolls and helps him to unlock the codexes. Joe thinks Cox took the crystal, and they arrange a trade at Wilt's Deli. While they wait for Cox to show up, Joe berates his brother for having improperly prepared a milkshake. When Cox arrives, they piece together the scrolls from the codexes, creating three-fourths of a map. Joe theorizes that the final scroll is hidden in Gloria's manor. The gang meets up there, and they surmise that the final scroll is actually hidden in the Heritage House painting at the museum. George-as-Frank mediates an agreement where they keep the other codexes in the Hardys' attic safe but only Cox will know the safe's combination. At Rosegrave, Callie encounters a science prodigy named Drew Darrow. Driscoll tells Brian that his agency needs the relic that had once contained the Eye. Stacy and two other members of The Circle offer George-as-Frank an alliance to fully resurrect The Circle. Drew introduces herself to Callie as Callie's new roommate. At the museum, lookouts Biff and Phil warn Frank, Joe, and Cox that police officers are approaching, and Cox bails on the Hardys but gets apprehended by the cops. After being distracted by his "brother," Joe realizes that Frank has stolen the final codex from the painting. Joe, Biff, and Phil return to the Hardys' home where they find Chet and Belinda bound-and-gagged from an unseen intruder. They realize the scrolls are all missing from the attic's safe. Stacy, Kanika (who has also returned to town), and other Circle Members wait for Frank to show up at their meeting spot; but when he does, another stranger hits a detonator. George-as-Frank is the only member of The Circle to survive the blast. Olivia reveals to Fenton that she's an agent for the DSA (Defense Support Agency) and trying to figure out why Laura faked her death. At Rosegrave, Drew tells Callie she's searching for the same "Sleep Room" once used by Project Midnight that Callie hopes to relocate. Joe catches George-as-Frank rifling around at the manor; he calls out his "brother" for being an imposter. George, inhabiting his great-grandson's body, aims a gun at his other great-grandson Joe.
| 25 | 2 | "A Vanishing Act" | Jason Stone | Chris Pozzebon | July 26, 2023 |
In a flashback to the 1960s: George transfers himself into the crystal. Back in the present day: George-as-Frank ("Frankengeorge") fires his gun at Joe, who jumps out of the way. They fight, and Joe escapes into the next room where Chet and Belinda help him to restrain Frankengeorge. Biff takes inventory of the scrolls and codexes. Phil agrees to decipher the fully-constructed map. Frankengeorge taunts the gang, claiming not all of them will survive what's coming; he also outs Phil for being in love with Biff. At Rosegrave, Drew confides in Callie about her late brother's identity as Patient A in the Midnight Project. Fenton summons Sam to the DSA safehouse, and Sam suspects that the local coroner had helped Laura to fake her death. Biff tells Phil she only likes him as a friend. At Wilt's Deli, Biff meets with her biological sister, Tess, who tells her about their deceased father and what Abigail was like before she'd skipped town. Joe cuts a deal with Frankengeorge, who confirms Frank is still alive inside the crystal. Joe, holding the Eye, has a flash of someone stealing a portion of the crystal but he doesn't know the thief's identity. Trudy interrupts Biff and Tess's lunch to locate Frank and Joe; Biff tells her they're at the Estabrook manor. When Trudy arrives at the manor, the gang stashes Frankengeorge away in George's secret vault. Once Joe is able to get rid of Trudy, the gang realizes Frankengeorge escaped through a hidden passageway. Frankengeorge arrives at the mine shaft where Jesse is investigating the recollapsed chamber; she takes him into custody. When Biff arrives at the police station to meet back up with Trudy, she sees Frankengeorge being questioned and phones Joe; they scheme to retrieve the codexes from Frankengeorge's bag. Drew hacks into Rosegrave's security system so she and Callie can gain access to the Sleep Room. Fenton gets lured into a trap. Jesse confronts Frankengeorge about how an eyewitness had spotted him near the detonation site. Drew and Callie enter the Sleep Room as Callie theorizes that Drew's brother somehow found his way into Frank's body; Trudy arrives at the police station to collect Frank, and Frankengeorge finds an opportunity to flee. The gang, who has also arrived at the station, chase him down. In the back alley, a mysterious stranger named Cadmus Quill shows up and invites the gang to come work for him. Back at the Hardys' house, Quill tells Joe and Frankengeorge that his employer wants them to retrieve The Core, which is the final relic left behind by The Circle. In exchange, Cadmus can deliver Laura to them alive. Biff tells the gang that Cox had managed to steal George's map. Joe knocks out Frankengeorge, reassuring the gang he doesn't trust his great-grandfather. The gang brings Frankengeorge, bound-and-gagged, to Callie and Drew's dorm room.
| 26 | 3 | "A Promise of Trouble" | Felipe Rodríguez | Laura Seaton | July 26, 2023 |
Callie introduces Drew to the gang, but Joe doesn't trust her. Drew decides to leave them alone, but she boasts to Joe how the gang will eventually need her help. Joe plans to absorb the Eye's power; the gang will then send Joe into the crystal where he'll reunite with Frank and share the Eye's power with his brother. The gang must then download Frank and Joe back into their original bodies using the Midnight Machine. Joe convinces the gang to get assistance from the incarcerated Adrian Munder. Munder warns them that both of the boys' consciousnesses could end up sharing the same body, so they should repurpose Burelli's second Midnight Machine. Belinda and Chet attain the chip for Burelli's machine from Brian. Frankengeorge taunts Callie about how she'll end up as a failure. Callie recruits Drew to steal a new part for rewiring the machine; meanwhile somebody sends Drew a mysterious warning message via computer screen. Down in the Sleep Room, Joe informs Belinda, Callie, and Chet that Munder will lead the reengineering process using Burelli's chip. Frankengeorge warns them that the crystal might be destroyed if something goes wrong, and the person who'd murdered The Circle is still alive. Joe touches the Eye and receives a premonition of him and Frank reuniting inside the crystal. Frankengeorge whispers to Munder that Aaron is still trapped inside the crystal along with Frank. Munder performs the upload, transferring Joe into the crystal. George's apparition informs Frank he'll never escape from the crystal. Frank witnesses a flashback of a younger Gloria sparing the life of George's chauffeur as she fires him with severance pay; the chauffeur steals some of the crystals before leaving the manor. Frank jumps to a premonition of Callie deciding to leave Bridgeport. Joe arrives inside the crystal, reuniting with Frank. As they argue about their next move, George arrives inside the crystal as well. Back in the lab, Munder forces the gang to upload him into the crystal too. George tries to reabsorb the Eye's power from his great-grandsons, but they entrap him. As Frank and Joe commune to make sure the Eye's power is divided equally between them, Munder arrives. The boys help Aaron and Adrian to reunite, and the Munders decide to stay trapped within the crystal together. As their friends complete the download, Frank and Joe return to their corporeal bodies; they transfer the power of the Eye back into the relic. Drew meets with Donald Mckay in the Rosegrave courtyard, and he blackmails her. Frank and Joe prepare to travel to Dixon City so they can reclaim the map from Fox. Joe reveals to Frank that Laura is still alive. Back at Rosegrave, the gang finds Drew and Donald were mugged...Drew's computer has been stolen.
| 27 | 4 | "The Crash" | Felipe Rodriguez | Ramona Barckert | July 26, 2023 |
Cox tries to extort a higher fee for the scrolls from his buyer, to no avail. The gang ambushes Cox at his apartment in Dixon City, but he decides to skip town because he's sick of the danger. However, Cox sees intruders coming and hides the gang in a safe room. Driscoll tells Brian he's perplexed that both Munder brothers are catatonic, so Chet and Belinda update Brian on the events that just took place in the Sleep Room. Adelia Kurt, the new dean of Rosegrave, implores Drew and Callie to keep the hooded assailant's attack a secret so Rosegrave can avoid more bad P.R. Back at the safe house, Frank surmises that George's chauffeur needs to be tracked down, and the map can be reconfigured to pinpoint the location of The Core. Drew plots with Callie to expose The Circle's nefarious activities to the general public. Phil identifies George's chauffeur as William Vogel. Down in the chamber, Frank and Joe have psychic flashes and experience seizures. Olivia visits Trudy to seek out Fenton's whereabouts; when Trudy speculates that the boys pieced together the full map, Olivia fears for their lives if they unlock The Core. After Frank and Joe recover from their seizures, they realize they were unable to shed themselves entirely of the Eye's power. The gang arrives with the other codexes, which fit together to create a holographic map of lay line powers showing how the relic pieces connect with the crystal as its Core. The lay line burns holes into the map; those holes serve as location markers connecting a path to the Core's location. At the deli, Wilt tells Phil and Biff how he used to know Vogel when they were younger. Frank, Joe, Chet, Belinda, Callie, and Cox follow the map to a rock quarry, where Cox's buyer and his operatives have tracked them. Cox lures them away. Drew sneaks into Dean Kurt's office and locates a hidden passageway leading back to the Sleep Room (now a cordoned-off crime scene), where she photographs evidence. Biff and Phil learn from the local jeweler that Vogel had his stolen crystals made into a necklace, which appears to match the one Drew is wearing. Joe theorizes that the final relic is contained in a meteor bound for the rock quarry, which they witness in the sky above them. Cox returns to his apartment, where he ambushes Quill; he then phones his buyer to lure them back there. Frank, Joe, Chet, Belinda, and Callie return to the rock quarry and retrieve the final relic. DSA agents close in on the gang, chasing them down. Once the gang is cornered, Trudy and Olivia emerge from one of the vans. Olivia tells them The Core is unstable once activated; she offers to transport the artifacts to Dixon City along with Frank, Joe, and Trudy so they can reunite with Fenton and Laura. En route to Dixon City, the Hardys realize Olivia is lying to them; Trudy knocks out Olivia, and they run her van off the road. Emerging from the wreckage, the Hardys are forced to hide without retrieving the artifacts as Olivia's accomplices arrive at the crash site. Back at his apartment, Cox watches from the safe room as the hooded figure enters and kills Quill. Frank and Joe sneak into the bar where they're supposed to rendezvous with Cox. The hooded figure, who'd pursued Cox to the bar, begins to shoot at random bystanders. Using himself as a shield, Cox takes a bullet in order to save Joe's life.
| 28 | 5 | "Revelation" | Jason Stone | Ramona Barckert | July 26, 2023 |
With his dying breaths, Cox utters a series of numbers to Joe. The boys return to Cox's apartment, and Frank phones Trudy to let her know they're safe. Trudy updates the gang, who continue to investigate Olivia and Vogel. Kept in a cell by his captors, Fenton spots a hidden message that may have been left there by Laura. As Fenton eats a sandwich they've fed him, he realizes it's drugged as he blacks out. Joe reminisces about Cox's dumb cover story from when the two of them first met; he blames himself for Cox's death. Frank finds a locker full of surveillance tapes in Cox's apartment, and Joe unlocks it using the code Cox had whispered to him. Awakening to find himself bound to an operating table, Fenton assaults Dr. Grafton — the surgeon employed by Fenton's abductors. Grafton admits that Laura's body and mind were being controlled remotely. Fenton phones Trudy with a secret message containing a rendezvous point. Driscoll confirms for Belinda, Chet, and Brian that Olivia was using the Kowalski namesake as part of an alias; he lets them search through his disorganized files. Biff and Phil locate Vogel at the Pine Grove facility. Once Phil summons Frank and Joe to the facility, Vogel reveals that he gave the necklace to biotech mogul Hurd Sparewell's daughter — for whose family he used to work. Chet has a psychic flash of Brian in danger. Callie finds out from Donald that Drew is one of the Sparewells. Frank, Joe, and Callie ambush Drew and confront her about her deceit. Drew reveals she's trying to bring down her father's empire, but Hurd had confiscated the crystal from her necklace even before Drew arrived at Rosegrave. She wants to bring justice to her late brother, Orrin, who was killed by Project Midnight. Then, Drew realizes she knows Olivia's true identity: her older sister (and Orrin's fraternal twin). Trudy and Jesse go to Fenton and Laura's old apartment, where they encounter Brian. The three of them get locked in and knocked out with gas. Biff and Phil spy on Hurd and Olivia transporting The Core to the Sparewell headquarters. Fenton and Laura meet up at their old apartment, where Laura reveals she's been tasked with eliminating him. Fenton restrains and tases her. Drew tries to convince the gang to let her help them steal back The Core. Hurd phones Cox's apartment to taunt the gang and threaten the lives of Trudy, Jesse, and Brian, whom he is holding as leverage. Fenton forces Grafton to remove the Sparewell microchip from Laura's brain, but Grafton admits he can only disable it or else Laura will die. Joe blames himself for everyone who is currently in danger. Drew suspects her dad has brought The Core to his thermodynamic lab. The eight teenagers vow to pull of the ultimate heist.
| 29 | 6 | "The Spider's Net" | Melanie Orr | Madeleine Lambur | July 26, 2023 |
Drew explains to Frank and Callie that The Core is essential to her father's covert weapons technology. Soon after, Drew blackmails her father's chief engineer, Bob Carpenter, into giving them the building's master plan. Joe, Biff, and Phil hear a suspicious clicking noise when they replay the tape recording of Hurd threatening Cox. Driscoll follows Belinda and Chet to Fenton and Laura's old apartment, where they find Trudy's key ring. Olivia shows up and fires her gun at Driscoll's chest, but Chet and Belinda escape through the window. As Chet and Belinda flee, Olivia shouts after them how they'll never find The Core "down there." Drew introduces Callie to Hurd so Callie can give him a pen as a "gift" and pretend to interview him; after he leaves for a moment, Drew laments how Hurd's old key card reader had been removed. This setback forces them to revise their plan by reentering the building through the parking garage so they can reach the basement faster; Frank and Joe stow away in the trunk of Drew's car. As the three of them use the building's elevator, it spontaneously stops; over their walkies, the gang can hear Callie being abducted by Olivia. Frank and Joe gain access to the ventilation shaft, which leads them into a lab where Olivia is waiting for them. Biff and Phil figure out that the clicks belonged to a computer transcribing Hurd and Cox's phone conversation. Olivia reveals that she lured Frank and Joe into the lab by manipulating Chet and Belinda with her choice of wording. Callie returns to the stakeout van, where she and Chet realize somebody had emulated Callie's voice to make it sound as though Olivia had abducted her. In the lobby, Hurd intercepts Chet, Belinda, and Callie. Upon interrogating them, Hurd realizes his daughters have been working together behind his back. Drew joins Frank, Joe, and Olivia in the lab, revealing to Frank and Joe that she used them to acquire The Core for herself. Drew also reveals that she secretly brought Frank and Joe to another location while they were in the trunk of her car; The Core was never even in Hurd's building! Hurd realizes that Drew and Olivia used him to create their ruse for the gang; Drew lied to the gang about everything, including her "brother" Orrin. Drew and Olivia activate a gaseous spray to knock out Frank and Joe, as Drew brags how they're about to take a helicopter ride — and the Sparewell sisters are planning to use The Core's technology in a way that will have global ramifications.
| 30 | 7 | "At The Old House" | Jason Stone | Chris Pozzebon | July 26, 2023 |
Frank and Joe awaken in a new location, where Drew tells them that Laura was her test subject for mind control. Drew wants to use The Core to manipulate the behavior of public figures all over the planet. After Drew leaves, Fenton and Laura break in and rescue the boys. Laura admits she doesn't remember most of her behavior while under the microchip's influence; she warns them she could be a liability. Frank and Joe confront Drew at the airstrip, and Laura knocks Drew out from behind. The boys disable The Core, but the Eye communicates with them and warns them they're still in danger. Driscoll reveals himself to the Hardy family; he claims to have survived by wearing a bulletproof vest when Olivia had shot him. He tells them the DSA is banning Sparewell technology from the public domain; Trudy, Jesse, and Brian were taken to the hospital for medical assessment. Laura suggests the Hardys return to their old house in Dixon City for some family bonding. Once they arrive there, Frank realizes it's his birthday; he and Laura play a game of catch. While walking back from the grocery store with Fenton, Joe sees an apparition of Cox; he tells Frank, who is skeptical. Laura suggests they remain in Dixon City, and Frank suspects Laura is still being controlled by the microchip. Laura tries to reassure him, but Frank worries he may have been supernaturally affected from the time when he'd resided within the crystal. Joe notices visual anomalies throughout the house; he and Frank figure out they are stuck in a virtual reality simulation run by Drew. The boys try to tell Fenton what's going on, but he is in denial. Frank identifies Laura as a facsimile. Fenton is forced to admit to himself that his perspective of the simulation began when Olivia brought him to the warehouse. This means that Laura isn't actually still alive, after all. Drew and Olivia monitor the Hardys' virtual simulation. Drew wants to fix the coding that the boys have cracked, but Olivia emphasizes how they need to activate The Core. As the boys tearfully say goodbye to Laura's facsimile, they reawaken in the Sparewells' virtual reality chamber. Fenton similarly emerges from the simulation. Drew inserts the crystal into The Core, declaring "The future is here."
| 31 | 8 | "A Wild Ride" | Melanie Orr | Chris Pozzebon | July 26, 2023 |
The rest of the gang abducts Bob to help them find Drew; he thinks Drew has brought The Core to a secret bunker she had built at the Edgecliff retreat house. Frank, Joe, and Fenton find George's corpse down in the Edgecliff bunker. Drew kills Olivia due to Drew's abandonment issues. Frank and Joe confront Drew, who explains how her virtual reality technology will envelop everyone on the planet via the lay lines fueled by The Core. This phenomenon, she says, will feed off of humanity's collective consciousness. Fenton rescues Trudy, Jesse, and Brian; but Drew traps them inside a vault. Drew activates The Core, and Chet fails to follow Callie, Biff, Phil, and Belinda down an escape hatch into the bunker in time. The entire world outside of Edgecliff transforms into virtual reality. Drew lectures Frank and Joe about how she's saving the world from climate change and other manmade disasters. When Frank and Joe refuse to join her, Drew shoots both of them. As she heads to the upper level of Edgecliff to celebrate, Drew is shocked to be confronted by Callie — who reverses time and knocks out Drew before Drew can kill the Hardy Boys. Frank, Joe, and Callie send Drew into the virtual reality program; Callie enters it, as well, so she can find the kill-switch that Drew has memorized. Inside the simulation, Drew claims to Callie that she'd lied about having created a kill code for the program. Callie tricks Drew into admitting the real relic which can reabsorb The Core's energy was hidden by her back at DSA headquarters. Frank pulls Callie out of the simulation. Belinda, Phil, and Biff join them to reveal how Chet had the relic on his person the entire time. Frank and Joe urge the rest of the gang to return to the control room so they can join the simulation if the boys are unable to safely collect the relic from Chet's body outside. The Hardy Boys successfully bring Chet down the hatch into the bunker, relic in tow. The gang realizes the only way they can shut down the simulation is by unleashing the Eye's energy onto the rest of the world. Frank volunteers to absorb The Core's energy so he can use himself as a vessel for accomplishing that. But when The Core proves to be too strong for Frank to withstand all by himself, Joe, Callie, Belinda, Chet, Biff, and Phil share the absorption burden. Phil, at the end of their "human chain," connects all of them to the relic so they can transfer the joint energies from The Core into the relic containing the remainder of the Eye. Together, the gang's seven-person consciousness disables Drew's virtual reality simulation. Afterward, at DSA headquarters, Driscoll (who'd been wearing a bulletproof vest when Olivia shot him, the same way Driscoll's simulation counterpart claimed to have been) swears the gang to secrecy. Drew is now in a catatonic state. Driscoll discloses that all computers worldwide now seem to be interconnected due to Drew's scheme (which has, in fact, created the Internet). He hints that he'll look the other way if the gang wants to steal some Sparewell laptops once they've signed their NDAs. Callie uploads all of Drew's information onto the newly-created Internet. Weeks later, Trudy and Jesse move in together. Sam tries to recruit Fenton for another mission, but Fenton announces he's retiring. Fenton suggests that Frank and Joe pick up Sam's case. The gang celebrates by playing video games as they help Frank and Joe track down some missing stamps for Sam. As they brainstorm and joke about how maybe Wilt stole the stamps, Wilt fields a phone call over in his deli. Wilt confers with his heist partner — it turns out that the two of them are indeed the actual culprits for the theft Sam needs investigated.

== Production ==
The series was announced in September 2019, and slated to be released on streaming service provider Hulu the next year. At the same time, Jason Stone and Steve Cochrane were set as part of the show's development. The Hardy Boys is based on the fictional book series of the same name written by multiple authors. A trailer was released in November 2020. The first season of The Hardy Boys premiered on Hulu in the United States on December 4, 2020, and consisted of 13 episodes. It began airing weekly on March 5, 2021 on YTV in Canada. The Hardy Boys was filmed in Ontario, Canada, with Cambridge serving as a featured location, and other settings including Port Hope and Hamilton. Almost the entirety of the cast were announced at once upon the series' December 4 release.

== International broadcasts ==
| Country | Network | Language | Title |
|---|---|---|---|
| Sri Lanka | TV Derana | Dubbed in Sinhalese | "හාර්ඩි බෝයිස්" (hārḍi bōyis), lit. 'Hardy Boys' |
