= Kyal Legend =

Canadian actress

- Born: Toronto, Canada
- Occupation: Actress
- Years active: 2014–present

Kyal Legend is a Canadian actress. On television, she is known for her roles as Julie Maslany in the Family Channel series Backstage(2016–2017) and Sierra 5 in the CBC Gem sci-fi series Utopia Falls (2020). Her films include V/H/S/94 (2021).

== Early life ==
Legend was born in Toronto to parents of Filipino and Jamaican heritage. She was raised by her single mother who enrolled her in a Montessori school and supported her dance career by driving her to downtown Toronto so she could train with the National Ballet of Canada.

== Career ==
Legend made her on-screen debut on the Canadian teen drama series The Next Step. Her first big role came playing Julie Maslany in the series Backstage. She had a recurring role as Sierra 5 on the sci-fi series Utopia Falls. She played Hayley in the horror film V/H/S/94.

== Personal life ==
In her spare time she works with Stacey Mackenzie of America’s Top Model to mentor and empower youth particularly young Filipina women.

== Filmography ==
=== Film ===
Year	Title	Role	Notes
2014	The Gabby Douglas Story	17–19 years old Joyelle	
2015	Reign	Natalie	
2015	Descendants	Dancer	
2016	Center Stage: On Pointe	Candie	
2019	Resolve	Charlie	Short
2021	V/H/S/94	Hayley	

=== Television ===
Year	Title	Role	Notes
2014-2015	The Next Step	LOD dancer	7 episodes
2016-2017	Backstage	Julie Maslany	60 episodes
2020	Utopia Falls	Sierra 5	9 episodes
