= Kate Drummond =

Canadian actress

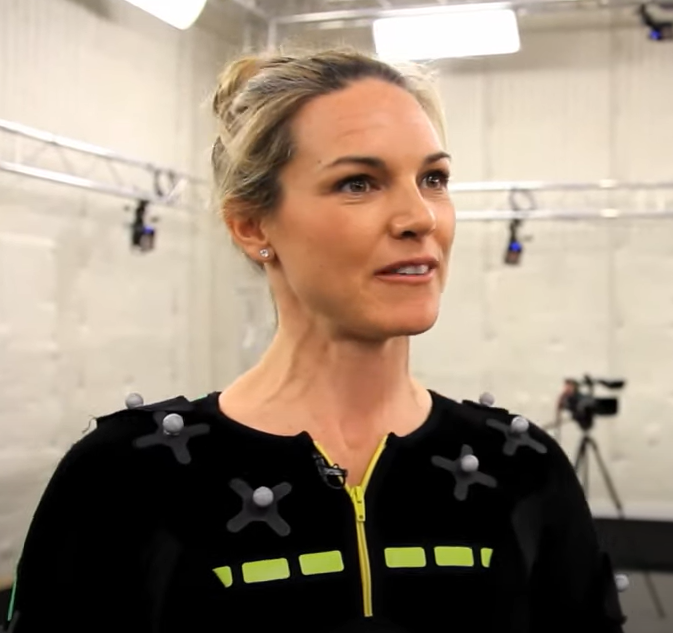
- Kate Drummond in 2013
- Born: October 21, 1975 (age 50); Woodstock, Ontario, Canada.
- Occupations: Actress, producer, director, screenwriter
- Years active: 2006–present

Kate Drummond (born October 21, 1975) is a Canadian actress and filmmaker. Kate starred as Nikki Bender alongside Brooke Shields in Hallmark Movies & Mysteries's Flower Shop Mystery TV movie series, she played Agent Lucado in the television series Wynonna Earp (2016–2017), as Authority Phydra in Utopia Falls (2020), and won best lead performance in a TV movie at the Canadian Screen Awards, for playing Claire Porter in Nowhere - Secrets of a Small Town (2019). In 2022, she starred alongside Kevin Hart and Woody Harrelson in The Man from Toronto.

== Early life ==
Kate Drummond was born on October 21, 1975 in Woodstock, Ontario, Canada; and raised in Sarnia, Ontario. Her father was a police officer and her mother worked at a milk factory, before both switched to real estate while Kate was at primary school. After graduating from St. Patrick's Catholic High School in Sarnia, Drummond attended McMaster University in Hamilton, Ontario, obtaining Bachelor's degrees in 1998 in Kinesiology and Education.

Kate worked as a full-time elementary school teacher for the Ottawa Catholic School Board for 12 years, before taking her first acting class at the age of 30, where she realised her "creative expression". Kate attended acting classes for 5 years, acting only in local theatre before deciding to leave teaching in 2006 and start her acting career.

== Career ==
Drummond played a leading role as Nikki Bender alongside Brooke Shields in Hallmark Movies & Mysteries's Flower Shop Mystery TV movie series, where her character and Shields' are best friends running a flower shop.

In 2016, Drummond landed a recurring role as Agent Lucado in seven episodes of the television series Wynonna Earp. In 2020, Kate played the role of Authority Phydra in Utopia Falls TV series.

In 2022, She appeared as Agent Lawrencein the Netflix dark comedy movie The Man from Toronto, alongside Kevin Hart and Woody Harrelson.

Kate has also performed voices in several video games, she plays the lead character Anna Grimsdottir (Grim) in the Tom Clancy's Splinter Cell: Blacklist (2013), and Assassin's Creed Odyssey in 2018 (see image).

== Recognition ==
- In March 2020, Drummond featured as a role model in an article of Women of Influence
- 2015 Drummond played a small role as a neighbour in a scene with Jacob Tremblay in the award winning 2015 film Room.
- 2016 Drummond wrote and directed the 2016 film Go Fish which was awarded Best Feature (Narrative) by the Muskoka Independent Film Festival.
- In 2020, Kate Drummond was nominated for and won Best lead performance in a TV movie, for Nowhere to be Found by the Canadian Screen Awards. The same film was nominated for Best Movie, Best Writing and Best Photography. Following the 2020 nomination, Drummond was reported to say “It’s truly an incredible honour, to those who think you may be too old to pursue a dream: It is never too late.”

== Filmography ==
=== Film ===
Year	Title	Role	Notes
2007	Breathe	Michelle	Short film
2008	Scrambled	Mom	Short film
2009	Death Rally	Killer	Short film
2010	The Kate Logan Affair	RCMP Officer #2	
2012	House at the End of the Street	Nurse	Uncredited
2013	The Informant	Officer Campbell NYPD	
2014	An Apartment	Rachel	Short film
2015	Working Mom	Claire	
2015	Room	Neighbour	
2015	Dealer Incentives	Miss Anderson	Short film
2016	It's About Time	Sarah	Short film
2016	Go Fish	Writer and Director	Forest City Film Festival - Best Feature Film
2016	Offbeat	Sarah	Short film
2016	Out There	Luna	Short film
2016	5 Films About Technology	Em	Short film
2017	Adam's Testament	Katherine Gable	
2018	Frat Pack	Fun Fanny	
2018	County Time	Taylor	Short film
2019	The Last of Ian Campbell	Maggie Campbell	Short film
2020	Healing Hearts	Carol Campbell	
2020	Life in Memories	Tonya Torem	Short film
2021	The Novice	Coach Edwards	
2022	The Man from Toronto	Agent Lawrence	
2023	Just a Friend	Sarah	Short film
2026	The Last Kiss	Diane Hansen	

=== Television movies ===
Year	Title	Role	Notes
2006	The Rival	Woman at Bar	TV movie; uncredited
2006	Proof of Lies	Restaurant Patron	TV movie
2007	Custody	Dog Walker	TV movie
2007	Like Mother, Like Daughter	Girl on Campus	TV movie; uncredited
2007	Demons from Her Past	Cafe Patron	TV movie; uncredited
2009	My Neighbor's Secret	Coroner's Assistant	TV movie
2010	The Perfect Teacher	Gretchen Keller	TV movie
2011	Metal Tornado	Wendy	TV movie
2011	No Surrender	Jody	TV movie
2012	Fugitive at 17	Nurse	TV movie
2013	Clara's Deadly Secret	Jane Jenkins	TV movie
2013	A Sister's Revenge	Jennifer	TV movie
2015	Lead with Your Heart	Sienna Halvorson	TV movie
2015	Open House	Samantha Contessa	TV short
2016	Flower Shop Mystery: Dearly Depotted	Nikki Bender	TV movie
2016	Flower Shop Mystery: Snipped In The Bud	Nikki Bender	TV movie
2016	Flower Shop Mystery: Mum's The Word	Nikki Bender	TV movie
2017	Love on Ice	Leslie Adams	TV movie
2019	A Dangerous Test	Amanda Fletcher	Lead role
2019	Trapped: The Alex Cooper Story	Mrs. Cooper	TV movie
2019	Nowhere - Secrets of a Small Town	Claire Porter	TV movie (Nominated for best Actress - and won)
2020	Deadly Jealousy: The Killer Cousin	Amanda Fletcher	TV movie
2022	My Mom Made Me Do It	Frida	TV movie
2023	Christmas Island	Helen Sharpe	TV movie

=== Television series ===
Year	Title	Role	Notes
2011	Sweet Tarts Takeaway	Sue	8 episodes
2013	Covert Affairs	CNN Correspondent	1 Episode: "Dig for Fire"
2013	CAT. 8	Beverly Hillcroft	TV miniseries; 2 episodes
2013	Being Human	Shelley	1 Episode: "It's a Shame About Ray"
2014	Beauty & the Beast	Agent Mallory	1 Episode: "Cat and Mouse"
2015	Open House	Samantha Contessa	TV short
2015	Good Witch	Annie	1 Episode: "Do the Right Thing"
2016	Degrassi: Next Class	Hunter's Doctor	1 Episode: "TurntUp"
2016	Damien	Joann	1 Episode: "Seven Curses"
2017	Dark Matter	Sajen	1 Episode: "The Dwarf Star Conspiracy"
2016–2017	Wynonna Earp	Agent Lucado	7 episodes
2017	Saving Hope	Joan Kilbride	1 Episode: "Tested and Tried"
2019	First Person	Robyn	1 episode - My Father's Dignity
2020	Utopia Falls	Authority Phydra	10 episodes
2021	Ghostwriter		3 episodes
2017-2021	Heartland	Paula Westfield	3 episodes
2022	Five Days at Memorial	Lily	1 episode

=== Video games ===
Year	Title	Role	Notes
2013	Tom Clancy's Splinter Cell: Blacklist	Anna Grimsdottir	Voice and motion capture
2016	Tom Clancy's The Division	Dr. Jessica Kandel	Voice
2017	Tom Clancy's Ghost Recon Wildlands	Additional characters	Voice
2018	Assassin's Creed Odyssey	Persephone, additional characters	Voice and motion capture
2019	Tom Clancy's The Division 2	Amanda Weekes, additional characters	Voice
2020	Immortals Fenyx Rising	Additional characters	Voice
2021	Far Cry 6	Additional characters	Voice

== Awards and nominations ==
Year	Award	Category	Nominated work	Result	Ref.
2017	Forest City Film Festival	Best Feature Film (shared with Brett Heard)	Go Fish	Won	
2019	Mammoth Film Festival Awards	Summit Award - Achievement in Filmmaking	Nowhere - Secrets of a Small Town	Won	
2020	Canadian Screen Awards	Best Lead Performance, TV Movie	Nowhere - Secrets of a Small Town	Won	
2024	Hollywood North Film Awards	Best Supporting Performer (Canadian Short Film)	Just a Friend	Nominated	
2024	Hollywood North Film Awards	Best Supporting Actress	Just a Friend	Won	
