= Addison Holley =

Canadian actress (born 2000)

- Born: May 18, 2000 (age 26); Burlington, Ontario, Canada
- Occupation: Actress
- Years active: 2008-present

Addison Holley (born May 18, 2000) is a Canadian actress who has had starring roles in several television series. In 2016, Holley was nominated for the Daytime Emmy Award for Outstanding Performer in a Children's Series for her role as Anne in Annedroids. She is the voice of the title character Ella in Ella the Elephant, Hazel in Little Charmers, Tessa in Peg + Cat, Amaya/Owlette in PJ Masks, Miss Elaina in Daniel Tiger's Neighborhood (until 2020) and Alexis in Pinkalicious & Peterrific. Her younger sister, Kallan, was the voice of Skye in PAW Patrol while she was the voice of Julia for the first four seasons.

== Filmography ==
=== Live-action roles ===
- Annedroids - Anne
- Baxter - Dana McNab
- Cold Blood - Jill Camm (episode: "Cop Killer")
- Cyborg Soldier - Katie
- My Babysitter's a Vampire - Anastasia (vampire)
- Really Me - Jenny Donkers
- The Red Maple Leaf - Frankie Palermo
- Rosie Takes the Train - Young Rosie
- Shelby - Haley
- Trapped: The Alex Cooper Story - Alex Cooper
- Star Trek: Discovery - Cadet Ross (episode: "Red Directive")

=== Animated roles ===
- Caillou - Layla
- Daniel Tiger's Neighborhood - Miss Elaina (2012-2020, seasons 1-4)
- Doodlebops Rockin' Road Show - Alice
- Ella the Elephant - Ella
- Grojband - Kate Persky
- Little Charmers - Hazel Charming
- Monster Math Squad - Sally
- My Big Big Friend - Lili
- PAW Patrol - Julia (seasons 1-4), The Cheetah
- Peg + Cat - Tessa
- PJ Masks - Amaya/Owlette
- Thomas & Friends: All Engines Go - Riff (US)
- Thomas & Friends: Race for the Sodor Cup - Riff (US/UK; Original dub)
- True and the Rainbow Kingdom - Day Queen
- Wild Kratts - Katie
- Wishenpoof! - Bianca
- The ZhuZhus - Jessica Beeker
