= Jeff Teravainen =

Canadian actor (born 1972)

Jeff Teräväinen
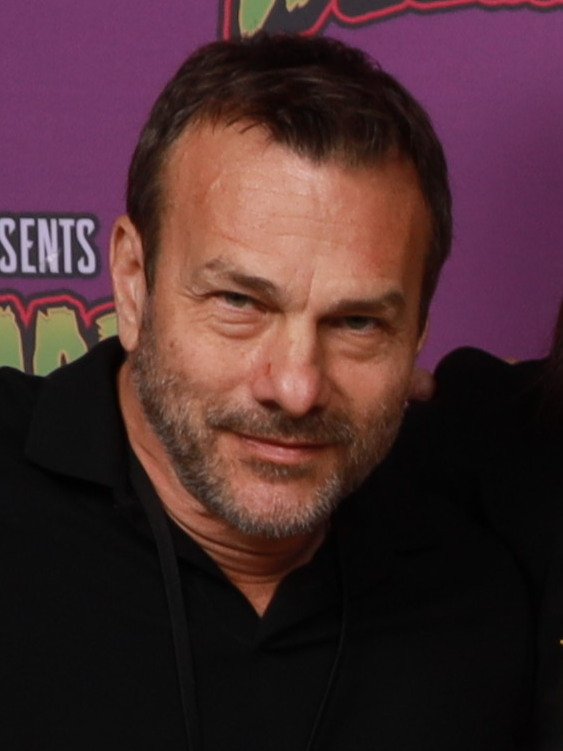
- Teravainen in 2025
- Born: October 13, 1972 (age 53); Oshawa, Ontario, Canada
- Occupation: Actor

Jeff Teräväinen (born October 13, 1972) is a Canadian actor.

== Acting career ==
Teräväinen is best known for portraying Sam Fisher or zero in video games, Deputy Labelle in Eli Roth's Thanksgiving, and his recurring roles on the TV shows Dark Matter as Lieutenant Anders and as Agent Stack on 12 Monkeys. He gained attention as the main bad guy in 2018's The Christmas Chronicles on Netflix.

He is also known as the "Voice of the Olympics" for Canadian broadcaster CBC in the 2006 Turino Winter Olympic Games, as well as the 2014 Sochi Winter Olympic Games. In 2014, he was also the "Voice of the 2014 FIFA World Cup" in Canada. Teräväinen also voiced the intro to CBC's Hockey Night in Canada for two years. He has voiced many characters for best selling video games like Far Cry 5 as Walker and various cult soldiers, Tom Clancy's Splinter Cell: Blacklist in various roles, and Far Cry 2 as Walton Purefoy. In 2019, he was cast as a series regular in the sci-fi drama Utopia Falls, which was released on Hulu February 14, 2020. Teräväinen received critical acclaim for his portrayal of Gerald. In 2020, Teräväinen voiced Sam Fisher, the protagonist of the Tom Clancy's Splinter Cell series, in Tom Clancy's Rainbow Six Siege.

Besides being highly in demand as a commercial announcer, Teräväinen has voiced dozens of doc series and specials, including narrating highly rated Discovery Channel Shark Week shows like Air Jaws and Sharkhouse. In 2024, Jeff was tapped to narrate Gordon Ramsay's FOX show America's Next Food Star. His most proud moment was being chosen by Clint Eastwood himself to narrate HBO/Warner Brothers' bio series Clint Eastwood: A Cinematic Legacy.
