= Joanna Brooks =

American author and professor

- Born: September 29, 1971 (age 54); Los Angeles, California
- Education: Brigham Young University (BA); University of California, Los Angeles (PhD)
- Occupations: Author, professor, scholar
- Writing career
- Subjects: Religious studies Transatlantic literature African American literature
- Website: joannabrooks.org

Joanna Brooks (born September 29, 1971) is an American author and scholar of American literature. Brooks is currently the Associate Vice President of Faculty Advancement and Student Success at San Diego State University (SDSU). Before working in academic administration at SDSU, she was a professor of English and Comparative Literature. She is a frequent media commentator on faith in American life, particularly in relation to her own Mormonism. Politico named her one of 2011's "50 politicos to watch" for her Twitter feed, @askmormongirl.

== Mormonism ==
Brooks writes extensively about Mormonism and Mormon feminism and is often quoted in the media related to issues regarding the Church of Jesus Christ of Latter-day Saints. The Huffington Post writes, "Brooks specializes in explaining the Church of Jesus Christ of Latter-day Saints to non-Mormons, and in presenting a different way to be Mormon to those steeped in its orthodoxy." She wrote a question-and-answer blog from 2010 to 2014 called "Ask Mormon Girl" with the tagline "unorthodox answers from an imperfect source". She also wrote as a senior correspondent for Religion Dispatches from 2011 to 2014, frequently addressing Mormon issues. In early 2012, she self-published a memoir called The Book of Mormon Girl: Stories from an American Faith, which was later picked up by Simon & Schuster and published by them in August 2012. Brooks was noted as one of "13 Religious Women to Watch in 2012".

Brooks sits on the board of directors for Dialogue: A Journal of Mormon Thought. Brooks is described as a feminist and liberal Mormon, in contrast to the predominantly conservative culture of Mormonism. In 2017 Brooks was among and ten co-authors publishing "Shoulder to the Wheel: Resources to Help Latter-day Saints Face Racism"

== Personal life ==
Brooks is married to David Kamper and has two daughters. She holds a bacherlor's degree from Brigham Young University and a PhD from UCLA. She is a member of the Church of Jesus Christ of Latter-day Saints.

== Works ==
- "Face Zion Forward": First Writers of the Black Atlantic, 1785–1798 (Editor, with John Saillant). Northeastern, 2002. ISBN 978-1-55553-539-1
- American Lazarus: Religion and the Rise of African-American and Native American Literatures (Author). Oxford, 2003. ISBN 978-0-19-533291-9. Winner of the Modern Language Association William Sanders Scarborough Award.
- The Collected Writings of Samson Occom, Mohegan: Literature and Leadership in Eighteenth-Century America (Editor). Oxford, 2006. ISBN 978-0-19-517083-2
- Transatlantic Feminisms in the Age of Revolutions (Editor, with Lisa L. Moore and Caroline Wigginton). Oxford, 2012. ISBN 978-0-19-974349-0
- The Book of Mormon Girl: Stories from an American Faith (Author). Free Press, 2012. ISBN 978-1-451-69968-5. Winner of the Association for Mormon Letters memoir award.
- Why We Left: Untold Stories and Songs of America's First Immigrants (Author). Minnesota, 2013. ISBN 978-0-8166-8125-9
- Mormon Feminism: Essential Writings (Co-Editor). Oxford, 2015. ISBN 978-0-19-024803-1
- Saving Alex: When I Was Fifteen I Told My Mormon Parents I Was Gay, and That's When My Nightmare Began. (By Alex Cooper, with Brooks). HarperOne, 2016. ISBN 9780062374608
- Decolonizing Mormonism: Approaching a Postcolonial Zion (Editor, with Gina Colvin). University of Utah Press, 2018. ISBN 978-1607816089, 1607816091
- Mormonism and white supremacy: American religion and the problem of racial innocence. New York: Oxford University Press, 2020. ISBN 978-0-19-008176-8.
