= Overachiever (disambiguation) =

Overachiever is an individual who performs better or achieve more success than expected.

It may also refer to:

- Overachievers, a television drama.
- The Overachievers, a non-fiction book.
