= Disjointed =

American television sitcom

- Genre: Sitcom
- Created by: David Javerbaum; Chuck Lorre
- Starring: Kathy Bates; Aaron Moten; Elizabeth Alderfer; Tone Bell; Elizabeth Ho; Dougie Baldwin; Betsy Sodaro; Chris Redd; Nicole Sullivan; Michael Trucco
- Opening theme: "Jack, I'm Mellow" by Trixie Smith
- Composer: Joseph LoDuca
- Country of origin: United States
- Original language: English
- No. of seasons: 1
- No. of episodes: 20

Production
- Executive producers: David Javerbaum; Chuck Lorre; Kathy Bates; Warren Bell; James Burrows
- Producers: Chris Arrington; Mona Garcea; Angeli Millan
- Cinematography: Peter Smokler
- Editors: Jim Miley; Chris Poulos
- Camera setup: Multi-camera
- Running time: 23–31 minutes
- Production companies: Chuck Lorre Productions; Warner Bros. Television

Original release
- Network: Netflix
- Release: August 25, 2017 – January 12, 2018

Disjointed is an American television sitcom created by David Javerbaum and Chuck Lorre and starring Kathy Bates. Twenty episodes of the series were ordered from Warner Bros. by Netflix, with the first 10 episodes premiering on August 25, 2017. The last 10 episodes were released on January 12, 2018. On February 14, 2018, Netflix canceled the series after one season.

== Plot ==
After decades of advocating for legalized cannabis usage, Ruth Whitefeather Feldman (Kathy Bates) employs her newly graduated son and a team of young budtenders to help run her Los Angeles cannabis dispensary. Along the way, Ruth and the team run into "highs" and lows. Delving into marijuana history, activism, 4/20, misconceptions about stoners, and the personal lives of the whole team, the show touches on serious issues such as post-traumatic stress disorder and highlights the medicinal benefits of the marijuana plant.

== Cast ==
=== Main ===
- Kathy Bates as Ruth Whitefeather Feldman
- Aaron Moten as Travis Feldman, Ruth's son
- Elizabeth Alderfer as Olivia, a budtender and love interest of Travis
- Tone Bell as Carter, the security guard who has PTSD from three tours in Iraq
- Elizabeth Ho as Jenny, a budtender
- Dougie Baldwin as Pete, the in-store grower
- Betsy Sodaro as Deborah "Dabby" Shapiro, a frequent customer of Ruth's Alternative Caring and Dank's girlfriend
- Chris Redd as Steve "Dank" Dankerson, a frequent customer of Ruth's Alternative Caring and Dabby's boyfriend

=== Recurring ===
- Nicole Sullivan as Maria Sherman, one of the dispensary's customers.
- Michael Trucco as Tae Kwon Doug, a neighbor who owns a Tae Kwon Do studio.
- Cass Buggé as Sabine Dortmunder, a CNNN reporter.
- Peter Riegert as Walter, a dispensary customer and love interest of Ruth.
- Ken Marino as Angelo DeStevens, a cannabis entrepreneur based on Steve DeAngelo.
- Lateefah Holder as Cheryl, a dispensary customer and developer of "Pot Coin"
- Missi Pyle as Mary Jane
- Elizabeth Sung as Lianmin
- Harry Groener as Judge Nelson
- Jessica Tuck as Ms. Carol Harris

=== Guest ===
- Richard Kind as Special Agent Barry Schwartz
- Cheech Marin & Tommy Chong as Themselves
- Alicia Witt as Rosie Bush
- Brian Baumgartner as Krinkles
- Rondi Reed as Nana
- Leonardo Nam as Jesus Bruce Lee Christ
- Creagen Dow as Ethan
- Jordan L. Jones as Stoned Kid

== Episodes ==
Series overview
Season	Episodes		Originally released
1	20	10	August 25, 2017
1	20	10	January 12, 2018

No. overall	No. in part	Title	Directed by	Written by	Trip animation	Original release date
Part 1
1	1	"Omega Strain"	James Burrows	Chuck Lorre & David Javerbaum	Animation by : Gabriel Mangold; Music by : APM	August 25, 2017
Ruth's son comes back from business school to help his mom with her cannabis dispensary. The newest customer, Maria, is a middle-aged home maker whom Ruth introduces to pot therapy.
2	2	"Eve's Bush"	Rob Schiller	Teleplay by : Taii K. Austin, Mike Dieffenbach & Will Hayes; Story by : David Javerbaum & Chuck Lorre	Animation by : Henry Bonsu and Damil Bryant (of Titmouse, Inc.); Music : "At Sea Again" by Slime (feat. Selah Sue)	August 25, 2017
After they connect, Travis and Olivia hallucinate Ruth while making out. Tae Kwon Doug puts in a complaint against the dispensary so customers Dank & Dabby, a deceptively stereotypical 'dumb stoner' couple of youtubers, start a protest outside, resulting in Ruth jumping Doug in the parking lot.
3	3	"Rutherford B. Haze"	Jon Cryer	Teleplay by : Bill Daly, Angeli Millan & Kevin Shinick; Story by : David Javerbaum & Chuck Lorre	Animation by : Anthony Francisco Schepperd; Music : "Karangailyg Kara Hovaa" by Yat-Kha	August 25, 2017
Ruth is bailed out early the next morning by Travis and her employees. Back at the dispensary, Jenny receives a package from her parents, causing her to feel even more guilty for lying to them. Travis strikes a sponsorship deal with Dank & Dabby, who have more than 100,000 Youtube subscribers. Carter opens up about his past as Travis and Olivia decide not to date. Carter takes pot for the first time.
4	4	"Erschreckendglückseligkeit OG"	Richie Keen	Teleplay by : Mike Dieffenbach, Will Hayes, Sam Johnson & Chris Marcil; Story by : David Javerbaum	Animation by : Sol Burbridge & Greg Arden (Bent Image Lab); Music : "Brough to the Water" by Deafheaven	August 25, 2017
Pete meets his hero, a pot photographer. Ruth decides not to meddle in her son's love life. Pete's plants begin talking to him as of this episode.
5	5	"Schrödinger’s Pot"	Richie Keen	Teleplay by : Bill Daly, Brenda Hsueh & Matt Kirsch; Story by : David Javerbaum	Animation by : Jonathan Djob Nkondo; Music : "Siren Song" by Flying Lotus (feat. Angel Deradoorian)	August 25, 2017
Jenny finally tells her mother she dropped out of med school. Ruth, Travis, and Carter play Scrabble while getting high. To Doug's surprise, Pete presents him with a candle as a gift. Jenny dumps her mother's special tea into the recently cleaned water tank.
6	6	"Donna Weed"	James Burrows	Teleplay by : Bill Daly, Mike Dieffenbach & Angeli Millan; Story by : David Javerbaum	Animation by : Taras Hrabowsky; Music : "Funkify Your Life" by The Meters	August 25, 2017
Ruth and Travis head to the funeral of a pot activist who was an old friend of Ruth's. The cannabis plants are doing better after being irrigated with the water infused with Jenny's mother's tea. Pete spends time with Doug, who wants to turn Pete away from pot.
7	7	"Prom Night"	Jon Cryer	Teleplay by : Will Hayes, Brenda Hsueh & Matt Kirsch; Story by : David Javerbaum	Animation by : Masanobu Hiraoka; Music : "Anthropoda" by Kaitlyn Aurelia Smith	August 25, 2017
Ruth is annoyed that Pete continues to work out at Tae Kwon Doug's. Carter, Jenny, and Olivia decide to look for a customer who made a nice comment online.
8	8	"Pyongyang Green"	Rhiannon O'Harra	Teleplay by : Taii K. Austin, Sam Johnson, Chris Marcil & Kevin Shinick; Story by : David Javerbaum	Animation by : Harry Teitelman; Music : "Holy Land" by Jenny Hval	August 25, 2017
Carter asks Ruth for advice on his life. Jenny reveals to Pete that she dumped the tea into the water without talking to him first. Travis brings his super hot, way out-of-his-league new girlfriend Tina by the dispensary.
9	9	"Olivia's S***balls"	Richie Keen	Teleplay by : Brenda Hsueh, Matt Kirsch & Angeli Millan; Story by : Warren Bell & David Javerbaum	Animation by : Jake Fried; Music : "Form by Firelight" by Jon Hopkins	August 25, 2017
Travis helps Ruth come up with a place to store her money. Olivia brings a box of delicious home made fudge swirls which look like turds. Travis suggests adding pot to their recipe, resulting in RAC's latest hit product, 'Olivia's Shitballs'. Jenny and Carter have a moment when mocking Dank and Dabby. Pete still hallucinates his plants are talking to him until 'Mary Jane', his hallucination of the spiritual embodiment of the cannabis plant, has sex with him and makes him harvest the plants.
10	10	"The Worst"	Guy Distad	Teleplay by : Taii K. Austin, Sam Johnson, Chris Marcil & Kevin Shinick; Story by : Warren Bell & David Javerbaum	Animation by : Hideki Inaba; Music : "The Poem of Ecstasy" by Alexander Scriabin	August 25, 2017
After Ruth changes the ownership of the dispensary to reflect her and her son owning the business together, they are raided by the DEA, putting Dank and Dabby under siege on the roof. While the two get increasingly less high and more panicky, the DEA threatens Travis with prison, then takes all of the weed and the cash.
Part 2
11	1	"4/20 Fantasy"	Richie Keen	Teleplay by : Sam Johnson, Chris Marcil, Taii K. Austin & Kevin Shinick; Story by : Warren Bell & David Javerbaum	Animation by : Grace Nayoon Rhee; Music : Distortion of "Eine kleine Nachtmusik" by Wolfgang Amadeus Mozart	January 12, 2018
Pete questions if he can ever grow pot again. Travis and Olivia hash out the growing profits from Olivia's Shitballs. Maria makes up "prison" stories from when she was placed in custody for a short while after the DEA raid. Dank & Dabby help bring Carter and Jenny's relationship out into the open.
12	2	"Helium Dream"	Richie Keen	Teleplay by : John D. Beck, Ron Hart, Brenda Hsueh and Will Hayes; Story by : Warren Bell & David Javerbaum	Animation by : Quique Rivera Rivera & Screen Novelties; Music : Parody of "Walking on Sunshine" by Katrina and the Waves (performed by Elizabeth Alderfer)	January 12, 2018
Ruth hosts Woman's Entrepreneurial Education Day with Rosie Bush, the militant lesbian, feminist and super judgmental pot farmer who runs Eve's Bush, the first all female, all-lesbian cannabis cooperative, and supplies RAC with the eponymous cannabis strain. First appearance of the Del Taco stoner ads as well as Cheryl, conspiracy theorist and inventor of the cannabis-based currency potcoin. Travis and Cater bond on the roof, Pete joins them and invites Tae Kwon Douglas along. Dabby sticks up for Ruth while Dank joins the boys. It turns out Dank & Dabby generate a yearly income of $190,000 on Youtube. Pete ends things with his "Mary Jane" hallucination who reveals her true nature, cursing him.
13	3	"Buds Lite"	Richie Keen	Teleplay by : Sam Johnson, Chris Marcil, Taii K. Austin & Kevin Shinick; Story by : Warren Bell & David Javerbaum	Animation by : Matt Taylor; Music : "Face of a Clown" by Witch Cross	January 12, 2018
Dank & Dabby get in trouble for smoking weed in a national forest. Olivia and Travis are interviewed by anchor Sabine Dortmunder for stoner channel 'Cannabis News Network Now' (CNNN) when a viral video from Olivia's past as 'Whatnot Girl' catches up with her. Pete thinks he is cursed when his plants start to die for no apparent reason. Ruth defends Dank & Dabby in court. Jenny gets a reconciliatory package from her mother.
14	4	"Weed of Fortune"	Richie Keen	Teleplay by : John D. Beck, Ron Hart, Brenda Hsueh and Will Hayes; Story by : Warren Bell & David Javerbaum	Animation by : Paper Panther Studios; Music by : Joseph LoDuca	January 12, 2018
Dank & Dabby have to spend two days in court with Ruth as their lawyer deciding to make a whole big thing out of fighting the system. Meanwhile, the others organize a "re-birthday ritual" for Pete to lift the curse he imagines to be under.
15	5	"Travissimo Private Reserve"	James Widdoes	Teleplay by : Sam Johnson, Chris Marcil, Taii K. Austin & Kevin Shinick; Story by : Warren Bell & David Javerbaum	Animation by : Mike Roush; Music by : Gledden, Dymond & Pedder	January 12, 2018
Tae Kwon Doug joins Pete on a trip to the forest without realizing Pete's goal is to retrieve the last surviving miracle weed plant. Jenny gets jealous of Jasmine, Carter's new therapy parrot. Meanwhile, Dank & Dabby have acquired an intern/minion named Zach and Ruth refuses to see a doctor about her sprained ankle.
16	6	"B.Y.O.P.F.U."	James Widdoes	Teleplay by : John D. Beck, Ron Hart, Brenda Hsueh and Will Hayes; Story by : Warren Bell & David Javerbaum	Animation by : Dylan Carter; Music by : Terry Devine-King	January 12, 2018
At the dispensary, Ruth meets first-time pot user Walter, a retired accountant, while Pete obsesses over the miracle weed seedlings rescued from the forest. As an ad/intermission, Ex-NFL players from the Gridiron Cannabis Foundation argue the league should legalize medicinal cannabis for its players. In the evening, Dank & Dabby throw a party where mumbling CNNN anchor Sabine Dortmunder appears to move on Travis and Carter tries his stand-up act while Ruth finally makes Maria realize her husband cheats on her with housekeeper Rosita.
17	7	"Emperor Shennong"	James Widdoes	Teleplay by : Sam Johnson, Chris Marcil & Kevin Shinick; Story by : Warren Bell & David Javerbaum	Animation by : Sachio Cook; Music by : L. Grounds & M. Pearse	January 12, 2018
Slimy pot personality Angelo DeStevens, another huge idol of Travis, wants to get into the Shitballs business with Olivia. While Maria is on a break with her cheating husband, Ruth and Walter start dating. Pete has bought Biowave, an electronic contraption supposed to help his weed plants grow. Tae Kwon Doug and Carter join an epic Cornhole battle for the parking spot.
18	8	"A-A-R-Pot"	John Fortenberry	Teleplay by : John D. Beck, Ron Hart, Brenda Hsueh and Will Hayes; Story by : Warren Bell & David Javerbaum	Animation by : Mathieu Labaye; Music by : Adam & Dan Skinner	January 12, 2018
Biowave starts talking to Pete and taking over the world. At the dispensary, Ruth hosts a cathartic „Puff And Paint Night“ and embarks on a relationship with Walter. Meanwhile, Angelo DeStevens secretly tries to cut Travis out of his and Olivia's cannabis edibles start-up.
19	9	"Dr. Dankerson's Revivifying Wellness Tincture"	Rhiannon O'Harra	Teleplay by : Sam Johnson, Chris Marcil & Kevin Shinick; Story by : Warren Bell & David Javerbaum	Animation by : Patricio Plaza & Santiago Bou; Music by : DeVore	January 12, 2018
Carter bombs at his first stand-up gig at open mic night in front of a real audience. Since Olivia has bailed with Angelo DeStevens, Travis hires Dank & Dabby as 'celebrity bud tenders'. They immediately turn their stint at the dispensary into a clichéd rom com while Biowave takes up annoying Tae Kwon Doug. Out of the blue, Walter declares he wants to end things with Ruth.
20	10	"Main Street, USA"	Richie Keen	Teleplay by : John D. Beck, Ron Hart, Brenda Hsueh and Will Hayes; Story by : Warren Bell & David Javerbaum	Animation by : Simón Wilches Castro; Music by : Joseph LoDuca, performed by Kathy Bates	January 12, 2018
Biowave takes over Pete's brains via Bluetooth. Travis' quest to replace Olivia continues while Jenny's mother finds out she is a bud tender and the resulting conflict threatens Jenny's romance with Carter. Olivia becomes increasingly disenchanted with Angelo DeStevens' marketing of her Shitballs while Ruth has a hard time processing Walter's revelation of his impending death.

== Production ==
In December 2016, Jessica Lu's role was recast with Elizabeth Ho taking on the role.

== Reception ==
On the review aggregator website Rotten Tomatoes, 19% of 37 critics' reviews are positive, with an average rating of 3.70/10. The website's consensus reads: "Bland and uneven, Disjointed does more smoke-blowing than joke-telling – though it's further proof that Betsy Sodaro is a comedian to watch." On Metacritic, the series has a weighted average score of 43 out of 100, based on reviews from 22 critics, indicating "mixed or average reviews".
