= Max Asher =

Max Asher may refer to:

- Max Asher (actor), actor during the silent film era
- Max Asher (drummer), former drummer of the American glam metal band
- Max Asher, one of the title characters in the television show Max & Shred
- Max Asher, a main character in the television show MythQuest
