= List of The Smart Woman Survival Guide episodes =

This is a list of episodes of the Canadian television sitcom The Smart Woman Survival Guide.

Thirteen episodes were produced for the first season. Before these had aired, twenty-six additional episodes were ordered by W Network.

== Season 1 (2006) ==
No. overall	No. in season	Title	Directed by	Written by	Original release date	Prod. code
1	1	"Which Truth Did I Tell"	Stephen Hall	Ramona Barckert	4 September 2006	1001
Today is Natalie Knowles' first day of work as a researcher at Smart Woman. And she's already lying. When Nat's best friend and boss, Liz, hires her, it's because she thinks Nat will be a good fit for the position, ready, willing and able – to drive her own car around town to fulfill research requirements. So Nat's first self-appointed task of the day? Buy the car she already said she had. Meanwhile, Liz stretches the truth about her daughter's toilet-training abilities to keep her in daycare. And when Brooke accepts two dates to the same function, she has to lie to someone. Tip: Most people expect the information they dispense to be trusted and treated as fact. If someone seems to expect otherwise, there's a good chance they're not to be trusted at all. Expert – n/a
2	2	"How Old is She?"	Stephen Hall	Ramona Barckert	11 September 2006	1002
Lana Pearson despises one day a year more than any other: her dreaded birthday. And this year it's a big one. When she refuses to let anyone speak of the date, the secrecy leads the women of Smart Woman to have some communication issues. When Liz tries to keep things quiet, Nat misunderstands the hush hush and plans a surprise birthday bash. And Brooke thinks Nat is excluding her on purpose. All the confusion leads to hand-to-hand combat, and not just in the show's self-defense segment. Tip: To keep your skin looking young and healthy, use a broad-spectrum sunscreen. These lotions block both UV-A and UV-B rays. UVB rays are the primary cause of sunburns, and UVA rays are the cause of wrinkles, and signs of aging. Expert – Lara Osland, Handywoman; Emmanuel Manolakakis, owner of Fight Club. Manolakakis has over 22 years in martial arts experience, including Karate, Olympic freestyle Wrestling, Western Boxing and Systema.
3	3	"Power Play"	Stephen Hall	Sarah Glinski	18 September 2006	1003
When Liz tells Nat she needs to take more on-the-job initiative, Nat volunteers to produce her first segment, 'Five Meals, One Prep'. Only thing is, Lana can't cook. Meanwhile, Liz tries to manage a pushy executive from the network. And Brooke deals with a bully of her own, Liz. Tip: Trying to talk yourself out of a verbal blunder can do more harm than good. Your best option? Apologize and move on. Expert – Alan Kearns, Head Coach of CareerJoy– The Career Coaching Company. Kearns is the creator of the Career Identity Program, and the Career Empowerment Process. He has been featured in Venture, the National Post, the Globe and Mail, and is the career expert for Charity Village.com. Chanelle Gallant, Manager of Good For Her, a female-oriented sex shop and sex education centre, and sex columnist for Chatelaine magazine. Theresa Albert-Ratchford, Host of the cooking program, Just One Bite. Albert-Ratchford is the author of Cook Once a Week and Eat Well Every Day. She teaches private clients at the Danforth Progressive Health Centre and public cooking classes at Loblaws. Albert-Ratchford is also a spokesperson for KitchenAid through their Kitchens For Cooks Institute.
4	4	"Basic Instinct"	Stephen Hall	Sarah Glinski	25 September 2006	1004
When Nat realizes the guy she asked to her cousin's wedding is wrong for her, she wants out of the relationship. Only problem is, he's the guest expert in the Smart Woman segment on 'Dating in the 21st Century'. Meanwhile, Brooke bets Liz she can go a day without flirting – right after which, Mr. Right walks into the office. And Liz, knee-deep in a segment about nutrition, accidentally insults her husband's weight. Tip: Still single? Consider hiring a matchmaker. You hire a real estate agent to find you the right house, why wouldn't you hire a professional to find you the perfect partner? Expert – Lisa Weinberg, Dietician, nutritionist at the Genesis Professional Group. Weinberg specializes in adult and pediatric nutrition, and writes a nutrition column for the Genesis Health Resources website. Lisa Ronis, Host of Manhattan Matchmaker. Ronis owns and operates a matchmaker service in New York City. She has been featured on Good Morning America, Dateline, The Radio Chick, Naked New York, The New York Times, USA Today, Cosmopolitan, Marie Claire and New York Magazine.
5	5	"Don't Go Changin"	Stephen Hall	Claire Ross Dunn	2 October 2006	1005
When a viewer's letter says Lana doesn't appear smart enough to be the host of a show called Smart Woman, Lana redefines her appearance (Glasses! They're what all the intellectuals are wearing!). Never one to do things on her own, Lana manipulates the women into changing too. Nat is to become one with her inner athlete, Liz is to become putty in Reggie's make-up artist hands, and Brooke has to learn to make do in a world without heels. Tip: Say goodbye to expensive eye creams: a dab of hemorrhoid ointment under your eyes will tighten the skin Expert – Dr. Dayna M. Freedman, MD; Laura Montgomery, Stylist
6	6	"Green with Envy"	Stephen Hall	Adam Nicholls	9 October 2006	1006
While the ladies wait in line for their morning coffee fix, they meet a hot barista who both Liz and Brooke set out to woo. Meanwhile, Reggie and Lana compete to see who has the better laundry room, and the men in Natalie's life compete for her affections. Let the games begin! Tip: Get two people who don't see eye to eye to find common ground by establishing a shared interest or enemy. Expert – Nicola Wilcox, Maytag appliances expert; Muriel Howden, Garnier Healthy Skin Coach, and manager of aesthetic services at Elmwood Spa; Janice Fedak, Organizational expert, designer for the Closet Factory. Fedak owns and operates Ivanna Designs. She is a spokeswoman for Benjamin Moore & Co. Fedak is also featured on The Smart Woman Survival Guide in season three.
7	7	"Their Cup Runneth Over"	Stephen Hall	Claire Ross Dunn	16 October 2006	1007
When Nat's breasts fail the 'pencil test,' she decides it may be time for some new lingerie and comes up with a plan to get Smart Woman to pay for it. Meanwhile, Liz's husband Steve has hired a busty new secretary. And Brooke takes a segment about breast self-exams into her own hands – literally. Tip: Be sure to rotate through the bras you use. Just one day of rest will prevent stress on the fabric, helping your bra keep its fit. Expert – Expert – Jen Klein, owner of Secrets From Your Sister, a lingerie store in Toronto; Dr. Dayna M. Freedman, MD
8	8	"Temptation Killed the Canary"	James Allodi	Joanne O'Sullivan	23 October 2006	1008
When Lana tries to quit smoking, all the women in the office face their temptations, too. Nat is enticed to cheat on Wyatt when she and Alistair find themselves in a close space. Liz is tempted to revive her Dizzie Lizzie persona, and Brooke cuts the cheese – from her diet. Meanwhile, as the staff succumb to personal desires, they ignore the needs of a very special guest in the studio – Lana's brand new pet canary. Tip: Quitting smoking? Fifty-four percent of attempts fail when using will power alone. Try making a commitment with friends and family who will support your efforts. Expert – David Farnell, Founder of Wine Sense, and sommelier. Farnell has held the post of Wine Director at the Toronto Star Wine Connection and is the resident sommelier at the Calphalon Culinary Centre. Dr. Ted Morris, Associate Veterinarian at the Bloor Animal Hospital.
9	9	"The Best Things in Life are Free – Plus Tax"	Stephen Hall	Ramona Barckert	30 October 2006	1009
When the office lottery pool wins big without her, Lana feels left out and leaves, mid-segment. Meanwhile, Brooke is stranded by the side of the road with a flat tire. And Lana's boyfriend, Callum, asks Nat's advice in popping the question, so as not to fall flat on his face. Tip: To retire comfortably at sixty, you should save fifteen percent of your annual income. Expert – Larry Berdugo, President of Berdugo Financial Group Inc. and V.P. of Sales and Marketing at Independent Financial Concepts Group Inc. Mark Lash, owner of Mark Lash Fine Jewellery.
10	10	"Lost in Transition"	Stephen Hall	Joanne O'Sullivan	6 November 2006	1010
When Lana returns from her relaxation retreat, she is a new-found believer in Inya, a methodology of new age hooey, and no longer has need for a make-up artist. Meanwhile, Brooke discovers her favourite lipstick colour has been discontinued and sets out to get it back in the make-up company's catalogue. And Nat's forced to let go of material things when the moving van company she hired steals everything she owns. Out with the old, in with the new. Tip: When booking movers, check their references and make sure they answer all of your questions. Expert – Staff Sgt. Chris Fernandes, Staff Sergeant for the Toronto Police Services. Fernandes has been featured in the Toronto Star.
11	11	"We Are Family"	Stephen Hall	Sarah Glinski	13 November 2006	1011
With all the talk of Lana's 'happily ever after' hanging in the air, Nat wants somebody to love. Only Nat reaches out and touches the worst guy possible, Wyatt, her ex. Meanwhile Liz and her husband, Steve, attend a tantric sex workshop to learn how to extend their love into a long-term commitment. And Brooke deals with the loss of a loved one. Tip: Most people who divorce answer 'no' to at least two of the following four questions: 1. Do you share the same expectations? 2. Do you share other things in common? 3. Can you manage conflict together? 4. Do you love each other the way you are now? Expert – Dr. Irvin Wolkoff, Consultant psychiatrist to the Bayview Community Services. Wolkoff is the host of House Calls and Love 911. He has been featured in the Toronto Star, Chatelaine, and on Canada AM. Lucy Becker, Tantra workshop instructor at the Tantra Centre of Toronto. Marel Finn, Registry and Design Consultant, Bowring.
12	12	"To Fail is Human"	James Allodi	Ramona Barckert	20 November 2006	1012
The stress of Lana's upcoming on-air nuptials reach new heights for the Smart Woman team when Lana's husband-to-be, Callum, announces he wants to wear a kilt in the ceremony – mortifying! When both Nat and Alistair ask Lana for a raise, she tells them whoever can get her man to change his mind gets the cash. Meanwhile Liz auditions bands for the wedding entertainment, only to decide she would be the best choice behind the mic. And Brooke becomes determined to get Lana to sign a pre-nup. Tip: Before contracting musicians to perform at your special event, be sure to hear them play. Include in the contract the date, location, hours, total price, overtime charges, and the number and length of breaks. Expert – Cynthia Martyn, Wedding Planner and owner of Cynthia Martyn Events Inc. Martyn has been featured in the Toronto Star, The Globe and Mail, Style at Home and Rich Bride, Poor Bride. She was named one of Canada's top ten talents by Elle Canada magazine. Krista Knee, Co-founder of Flirty Girl Fitness.
13	13	"Countdown"	James Allodi	Claire Ross Dunn	27 November 2006	1013
Lana hands out wedding-themed assignments as 'Weddingpalooza' barrels towards its inevitable conclusion. Only, when Nat's tasked with trailing the groom, she discovers firsthand that Lana's husband-to-be is a cad. Meanwhile, Brooke meets a hot minister and wants to get biblical. And Liz discovers she might be pregnant, but it's not an Immaculate Conception. Tip: You can avoid your period on special occasions by taking the Pill straight through two months, without taking the usual week off. Expert – David Clemmer, Stylist and co-founder of Judy Inc, an artist management company. Clemmer is also the wardrobe consultant on Style by Jury.

== Season 2 (2007) ==
No. overall	No. in season	Title	Directed by	Written by	Original release date	Prod. code
14	1	"The Aftermath"	Stephen Hall	Sarah Glinski	10 March 2007	2014
When Lana returns from her Spanish honeymoon keen to air her new Castilian accent on the Smart Woman special, 'Fiesta Espana', Liz has to find a way to create the segment without alienating the Smart Woman viewers. Meanwhile, Nat wonders whether to tell Lana that she and Callum kissed on their wedding day. And Brooke accidentally erases Lana's digital wedding album. With special guest, Rick Campanelli, of Entertainment Tonight Canada. Tip: Want to catch a cheater? Send flowers to your partner's workplace with no note. If you don't receive a thank you call, he or she is probably thanking someone else. Expert – Thomas A Klatt, private investigator. As a former Toronto Police Services homicide detective, Klatt was involved in more than 70 murder investigations and has one of the highest clearance rates in Canada. He specializes in crime scene profiling and statement analysis. Klatt now works as the managing director of the security firm MKD International Inc.
15	2	"Tastes Like Chicken"	Stephen Hall	Ramona Barckert	17 March 2007	2015
When Lana's newest guest chef turns out to be the high school sweetheart who jilted Brooke on prom night, Brooke sets out for revenge (a dish best served cold, with parsley for show). Meanwhile, Liz faces retribution from both Nat and Steve when she tries to sabotage their video game competition. And Alistair tries to set Phil up with a new girl to help him get over Nat. Tip: Picky eater in the family? Try the one bite rule: everyone must eat at least one bite of everything on their plate before they leave the table. Expert – n/a
16	3	"The Rumour Mill"	Stephen Hall	Alex Zarowny	24 March 2007	2016
After Nat eavesdrops on a conversation where Liz uses words like 'terminate' and 'lay off', Nat's certain that someone at Smart Woman is getting fired – specifically her. Meanwhile Liz is misquoted by a local magazine, and has to stop the presses. And when Brooke hears a rumor that she's bad at beat poetry, she puts on a beret to prove the rumor wrong. Tip: First impressions matter. Most employers spend less than two minutes looking over your resumé. Expert – Alan Kearns, Head Coach of CareerJoy – The Career Coaching Company. Kearns is the creator of the Career Identity Program, and the Career Empowerment Process. He has been featured in Venture, the National Post, The Globe and Mail, and is the career expert for Charity Village.com. Scot Cooper, Director of The Brief & Narrative Therapy Network. Cooper is the author of A Competency-Based Classroom: A Classroom Manual, and organizes international conferences highlighting the ideas and practice of brief and narrative therapy. Brief therapy is solution-based rather than problem-oriented.
17	4	"The Germans are Coming"	Stephen Hall	Claire Ross Dunn	1 April 2007	2017
When Liz invites a French sales agent to the studio to help Smart Woman design a proposal for potential buyers from the European market, she discovers the Frenchman has an adulterous proposal for her as well. (Hint: it doesn't involve the European market.) Meanwhile, Brooke has to choose when the men she's double datin] are both interested in being her one and only. And Alistair makes Nat pay for cheating on a relationship commitment they still haven't made. With relationship expert, Josey Vogels. Tip: It's fine to play the field, as long as both teams know the score. Expert – Josey Vogels, author of the relationship column "My Messy Bedroom" and the dating advice column "Dating Girl." Vogels has published 5 books on sex and relationships, one of which, The Secret Language of Girls, has been made into a documentary. She also hosted the Gemini-nominated series, 'My Messy Bedroom,' on the W Network.

== Season 3 (2007–08) ==
No. overall	No. in season	Title	Directed by	Written by	Original release date	Prod. code
18	1	"The Hot Marriage Bed"	Stephen Hall	Claire Ross Dunn	11 August 2007	3018
When Nat and Alistair are assigned to test out mattresses for a show segment, it leads them to consider testing the boundaries of their relationship. Meanwhile, Liz realizes her relationship with Steve could benefit from fewer boundaries. And Brooke tries to broaden her dating boundaries with Ty, to just being friends… with benefits. With guest expert sex columnist Chanelle Gallant. Tip: Beware of high thread counts at low prices, some manufacturers twist two threads into one and count it twice. Expert – Pamela Cameron, Manager of Lovecraft, the oldest sex shop in Canada.
19	2	"Out of the Closet, Into the Fire"	Unknown	Unknown	18 August 2007	3019
When his parents visit the Smart Woman studio, Reggie is terrified they'll discover the big secret he's keeping – he's the show's makeup artist. Meanwhile, Brooke discovers a whole new 'vintage' retail therapy. And Alistair and Liz work together to hide a mutual obsession for a forbidden dance. Tip: Need to silence a squeak? Rub handsoap on the squeaky hinges of your offending door. Expert – Janice Fedak, Organizational expert, designer for the Closet Factory. Fedak owns and operates Ivanna Designs. She is a spokeswoman for Benjamin Moore & Co. Fedak was also featured on The Smart Woman Survival Guide in Season One; Carmen Dilulla, owner of L'Elegante, consignment shop.
20	3	"Check Your Insecurities at the Door"	Stephen Hall	Sarah Glinski, Adam Nicholls	25 August 2007	3020
When husband Steve spurns one of her romantic advances, Liz becomes insecure about her sexual appeal. Meanwhile, Brooke's new-found monogamy makes her uncertain about her ability to keep a man's interest. And, Nat's excited to finally shake her self-doubt by booking a big name co-host for Lana's International Home Show appearance, until she realizes she's stumbled upon Lana's biggest fear. Tip: The key to flirting is to focus on what the other party is interested in. Expert – n/a
21	4	"Break Free"	Arlene Hazzan Green	Claire Ross Dunn, Joanne O'Sullivan	1 September 2007	3021
When Liz's 'hot cop/flirty felon' afternoon with her husband is interrupted by a crisis at work, Liz needs to break free of her need to be in control – and the playtime handcuffs her husband has put her in. Meanwhile, Nat realizes that to break free of Phil's amorous intentions, she'll have to do away with niceties altogether. And Alistair agrees to swap workloads with Brooke to break free of his traditional job role, bringing him face to face with a fake vagina, and a gynecologist interview. Tip: Write a personal life list to harness your direction, represent your goals and make you accountable to yourself by committing your desires to paper. Expert – Dr. Fay Weisberg, Undergraduate Teaching Coordinator in the Department of Obstetrics and Gynecology at the University of Toronto. Dr. Weisberg also practises out of the Women's College Hospital, specializing in menopause and contraception. Dr. Weisberg works in the Sunnybrook Women's College Hospital Fertility Centre.
22	5	"Attack of the 19-Year-Old Know-It-All"	Arlene Hazzan Green	Sarah Glinski	8 September 2007	3022
When Lana's 19-year-old, precocious niece visits the Smart Woman studio, she forces Lana's team to consider realities they'd never thought of before. Liz wonders if she may be a hindrance to Gracie getting into a good private school, Brooke questions if she should be in another profession, and Nat discovers Alistair may not have eyes for only her. With special guest expert, New York Times bestselling author, Alexandra Robbins. Tip: Need to get rid of a pest? Here's a humane remedy to get rid of mice. Mix cayenne pepper, horseradish, salad oil and garlic together, and spray around infested areas. Expert – Alexandra Robbins, New York Times bestselling author and journalist who has written for a variety of publications, including The New Yorker, The Washington Post, and Cosmopolitan. Robbins has appeared in the national media, on shows such as 60 Minutes, The Oprah Winfrey Show, The Today Show, and The View. She is the author of Conquering Your Quarterlife Crisis, The Overachievers, Pledged, and Secrets of the Tomb.
23	6	"Smart Man Survival Guide"	Arlene Hazzan Green	Ramona Barckert, Adriana Maggs	15 September 2007	3023
When Lana realizes Reggie's keeping secrets from her, she forces him to promise to be open about everything in his life. Only it turns out there are things she really doesn't want to know. Meanwhile, Brooke thinks Ty's being too open, and becomes interested in a man of mystery, Phil (yes, Phil). And a horrified Nat stumbles upon her father's secret weapon, Viagra. Tip: In over your head? Make sure your personal flotation device is approved by the appropriate government organization. Expert – Michael Kaufman, author of six books focused on rethinking the ideas of manhood, challenging sexism and developing better relations between the sexes. Kaufman is one of the founders of the White Ribbon Campaign, a campaign of men working to end violence against women.
24	7	"The Sharp Point"	Michael Kennedy	Claire Ross Dunn, Adam Nicholls	22 September 2007	3024
Let the games begin! When Lana's sexual nemesis, lifestyle host Pete Sharp, challenges her staff to a game of volleyball, Lana jumps at the opportunity, and it's winner take all. Meanwhile Liz and Brooke are up for the same producing award… and Lana will only give out one reference letter. And Alistair tries to prove he's a good match for Geneva on and off the volleyball court. With special guests, Olympians Conrad Leinemann, Mark Heese, and Marc Dunn. Tip: To build a strong team, be sure to reward accomplishments, not just point out mistakes. Expert – Conrad Leinemann, Beach Volleyball Olympian. Leinemann finished 9th at the Sydney Olympic Games, and is a Pan Am Games Gold Medalist, with a 100+ km/hour serve. Mark Heese, Beach Volleyball Olympian. Heese brought home Canada's first medal in beach volleyball at the Atlanta Olympic Games in 1996. Marc Dunn, Beach Volleyball Olympian. Dunn finished 17th at the Atlanta Olympic Games. He won the University of Toronto George M. Biggs award for leadership, sportsmanship and athletic achievement, and has been inducted into the North Bay Sports Hall of Fame. Dr. Barbara Moses, President of BBM Human Resource Consultants Inc. Dr. Moses is an internationally best-selling author, and is considered a career guru. She has been profiled in major North American publications including Fast Company magazine, the New York Times, the Los Angeles Times, the Chicago Tribune and the Report on Business.
25	8	"Sweet Charity"	Michael Kennedy	Sarah Glinski	29 September 2007	3025
When an article is published declaring that Lana is stingy, she gets the staff to create a foundation on her behalf. Meanwhile, when Liz realizes she's the least philanthropic woman at "Smart Woman", she's eager to do something charitable… and ends up donating far more than she can afford. Nat tries to be charitable towards Geneva, and Lana takes to the street to find a worthy cause. With special guest expert, three-time Nobel Peace Prize nominee, Craig Kielburger. Tip: Get a couple of donations written down on your collection sheet or webpage before you ask for handouts from the masses. People like to do things they see others have done. Expert – Craig Kielburger, founder and Chair of Free the Children, and Nobel Peace Prize nominee. Kielburger founded Free the Children when he was 12 years old. The charity now has more than one million young people involved in programs that span 45 countries. He has received the Nelson Mandela Human Rights Award, the Roosevelt Freedom Medal and the Children's Nobel Prize. Kielburger is the recipient of two honorary doctorates from the University of Toronto. Free the Children has built more than 450 primary schools, providing daily education to more than 40,000 children.
26	9	"The House that Pride Built"	Michael Kennedy	Joanne O'Sullivan	6 October 2007	3026
When Lana purchases a new house, she manipulates the network into giving her free renovations by promising to deliver a cross-promotion show with her sexual nemesis, Pete Sharp. However, the sabotage spectacle that she and Pete put on is not a show the network can air. Meanwhile, Nat steals Alistair's idea to make a behind-the-scenes featurette. And Brooke has to come to terms with the fact that some guys really do get over her. Tip: Be sure to get the permits required before beginning construction work at home. Without a permit, the city can tear down completed work to check if it's to code. Expert – n/a
27	10	"Full Moon"	Arlene Hazzan Green	Claire Ross Dunn	13 October 2007	3027
When Lana tries to prove it's inept temperature control, and not her hormones causing her hot flashes, she makes an enemy of a superintendent with a short fuse. Meanwhile, a waft of Reggie's pheromones leaves Alistair questioning his sexuality. And a surge in Liz's hormones turns her into a woman on a mission. A baby-making mission. Tip: In a black-out, be sure to unplug any appliances that were running. When the power comes back on, it may surge and damage your computer system, or the motor in your air conditioner. Expert – Dr. Karen Glass specializes in reproductive endocrinology and infertility. Dr. Glass is working with the Toronto Sunnybrook Regional Cancer Centre to start a clinic for female fertility preservation in cancer patients.
28	11	"Pass the Buck"	Srinivas Krishna	Claire Ross Dunn	20 October 2007	3028
Lana impulsively creates a Smart Woman book club, leaving the staff to read a 300-page novel before taping the segment with the author – at the end of the day. Meanwhile, Liz has to bake 200 cookies for the PTA. And Nat owes the phone company more than she can pay. When Alistair is saddled with saving the day, he starts a chain of passing the buck, where everyone hands off their work to everyone else and nothing gets done. And then the author arrives… with special guest, Camilla Gibb, author of Sweetness in the Belly. Tip: Feel like you've got no time? Sit down and read the paper as a family activity at least once a week. It'll keep you informed, and let you spend quality time with the people who matter. Expert – Camilla Gibb, author of Sweetness in the Belly, The Petty Details of So-and-so's Life, and Mouthing the Words. Gibb received the Trillium Book Award in 2006 and was a Scotiabank Giller Prize nominee in 2005. Her books have been published in 18 countries and translated into 14 languages.
29	12	"Diet Wars"	Morgan Drmaj	Sarah Glinski	27 October 2007	3029
When Lana is offered the opportunity to become the spokeswoman for a new clothing line she decides to go on a crash diet before the photo shoot. To bolster her morale, Reggie lures the rest of the office into starving along with her. Meanwhile, Nat's new diet affects her lunch date with Ike. And Alistair weighs his relationship with Geneva. With special guest expert Rick Gallop, author of The G.I. Diet. Tip: Crash diets lower your metabolism, making it harder, not easier, to burn calories. Expert – Rick Gallop, author of The G. I. Diet. During his 15-year tenure as President of the Heart and Stroke Foundation of Ontario, Gallop was responsible for raising over $750 million for research and education. According to publisher's reports, The G.I. Diet is the most successful Canadian diet book to date, with more than 1.5 million copies sold worldwide.
30	13	"Smart Parents"	Stephen Hall	Joanne O'Sullivan	3 November 2007	3030
Lana decides to shoot a segment on the trials and tribulations of being a new parent, and mentions glibly to a friend that she knows all about life with a newborn. Mistakenly thinking Lana has actually become a new mother, her friend invites Lana into the exclusive Mothers with Money Society, an invitation Lana readily accepts. Now all Lana needs is a baby. Meanwhile, Brooke discovers a penchant for motherhood. And Phil learns even god-parenting is not as easy as it looks. With special guest, parenting expert Barbara Coloroso. Tip: As a new parent it's important to make time for yourself and be healthy. When Mum isn't happy, nobody is. Expert – Barbara Coloroso, internationally recognized parenting expert. Coloroso is author of four best-selling parental advice books: Kids are worth it; Parenting Through Crisis, Helping Kids in Times of Loss, Grief, and Inner Discipline; The Bully, the Bullied, and the Bystander; and Just Because it's not Wrong Doesn't Make It Right. Her most recent book, Extraordinary Evil: Why Genocide Happens, was published in January 2007.
31	14	"Earth Day"	Arlene Hazzan Green	Claire Ross Dunn	10 November 2007	3031
When Nat sets up an interview with Rob Stewart, director of Sharkwater, Lana decides the next step in building her media empire should be an environmental motion picture. Meanwhile, when all the credit for Liz's hard work is given to another member of the PTA's Green Roof committee, Liz decides to teach her adversary a lesson – that undermines all the hard work she herself has done. And when Phil realizes Reggie's been using him to try to win a hybrid car, Phil decides to compete for the car for himself. With special guest expert, Rob Stewart, director/producer of Sharkwater. Tip:Become carbon-neutral. Calculate your personal [CO2 emissions], then compensate by investing money into alternative energy sources, planting trees or doing environmental clean-up. Expert – Rob Stewart, director/producer of the award-winning environmental feature film documentary, Sharkwater. Stewart is an experienced diver, underwater photographer and conservationist.
32	15	"Breach of Contract"	Stephen Hall	Sarah Glinski	17 November 2007	3032
When Liz realizes it was her sexual appeal, and not her mental capabilities that landed Smart Woman a big-time celebrity lawyer in a multi-episode appearance, she attempts to renegotiate without her va va voom. Meanwhile, Brooke puts her romantic desires with a cute cameraman on the dotted line. And Lana lands in jail. Tip: If you find yourself pulled over by the police, keep your hands in plain sight, make no sudden moves, be polite and to the point. Expert – n/a
33	16	"Debt and Taxes"	Stephen Hall	Claire Ross Dunn	24 November 2007	TBA
When Alistair realizes that he forgot to prepare Lana's tax return, he begs the Smart Woman team to help get things in order. Meanwhile, Nat has forgotten to budget for her tax payment costs, and needs to find a lender, any lender. And Liz's taxes are complete, but for one last receipt – the receipt from Gracie's day care manager. Who's always had it out for Liz. As the tax deadline looms, will the Smart Woman team take accounting matters to new creative lengths? Tip: Communication between a taxpayer and his or her accountant is not subject to privilege under the law. Expert – Alison Griffiths, financial expert and host of W Network's Maxed Out. Griffiths is a frequent guest on financial and current affairs programs across Canada, and co-writes the column "Portfolio Doctor" for the Toronto Star with her husband, David Cruise. Along with her husband, she has also co-written many best-selling books including: On South Mountain – the Dark Secrets of the Goler Clan; The Great Adventure – How the Mounties Conquered the West; Lords of the Line – The Men who Built the CPR; Net Worth – Exploding the Myths of Pro-Hockey; and Vancouver – A Novel.
34	17	"Old Flames"	Arlene Hazzan Green	Yasmine Abbasakoor, Ramona Barckert	1 December 2007	3034
To get Lana into an exclusive celebrity dinner hosted by Jamie Kennedy, Nat has to ask a favor of her old boyfriend Wyatt, and Reggie has to deal with a dry cleaner who's seen him with his clothes off. Meanwhile, when Brooke dates Liz's former beau, Liz tries to prove once and for all that you really can get over your ex. Tip: If you want to try to rekindle a relationship with an ex, trying being friends first to see if the passion and interest are still there. Expert – Jamie Kennedy, owner and executive chef of the Jamie Kennedy Wine Bar, the Jamie Kennedy Restaurant and the Jamie Kennedy Gardiner. Kennedy is the author of the Jamie Kennedy Cookbook and Jamie Kennedy's Seasons. He was named Chef of the Year by the Ontario Hostelry Institute in 2007. Kennedy also helped establish Knives and Forks, an alliance of Ontario organic growers and chefs.
35	18	"Mother's Day"	Morgan Drmaj	Adam Nicholls	8 December 2007	TBA
When Lana's mom flies into town with her brand new tell-all book, Lana blows her stack. Meanwhile, Liz has Mommy-issues of her own when she tries to juggle between the fashion sense of her four-year-old daughter and that of her own mother. And all of Alistair's attempts to make Nat feel good on the anniversary of her mother's death fall flat. When the gang end up at the bookstore promotion, they're forced to deal with their mother/daughter issues in a very public arena. Tip: How to say you're sorry: take immediate responsibility, explain you didn't mean any harm. Take the mistake seriously. Repair the damage. Ask 'what can I do to make it up to you?'. Expert – Annabelle Garland, Psychotherapist and grief counsellor. Garland works on the faculty of the University of Toronto School of Social Work and the Canadian Centre for Bereavement Education and counseling and teaches a post-graduate certificate course on bereavement education.
36	19	"Lumination"	Arlene Hazzan Green	Ramona Barckert	15 December 2007	3036
Lana becomes the new face of the fabulous new sunless tanner product, Lumination, but the results are less sun-kissed than day-glo, forcing Lana to decide what she's more committed to: integrity or fame. Meanwhile, Nat holds Liz to a promise she made back in University. And Phil tests Alistair's friendship with a sunless request of day-glo proportions. Tip:The "tan" a sunless tanner creates is a chemical reaction that occurs in the uppermost layer of skin cells. The stain lasts for about four days, or until the skin exfoliates. You can speed up the disintegration of the tan exfoliating with a scrub. Expert – Kristina Matisic and Anna Wallner, hosts of the award-winning lifestyle program The Shopping Bags on the W Network. The Shopping Bags has won numerous Leo Awards and two Gemini Award nominations. Matisic and Wallner also co-authored the show's companion book, The Shopping Bags: Tips, Tricks and Inside Information to Make You a Savvy Shopper.
37	20	"Santa's Last Stand"	Arlene Hazzan Green	Sarah Glinski	22 December 2007	3037
When a new network executive tells Liz to force Lana to make their holiday show secular ("Sexier?, "No, secular."), Liz refuses to do away with tradition. Meanwhile, Brooke oversteps her bounds and reveals the truth about Santa to the children's choir. And Nat tries to start some romantic holiday rituals of her own, with Alistair. Tip:When buying a real Christmas tree, look for needle resilience. Take hold of a branch of the tree and rake your hand back towards you. Ideally, most of the needles should stay on the tree. Expert – Reverend Alison Barrett, minister for the First Unitarian Church of Hamilton.
38	21	"Just Do It"	Stephen Hall	Sarah Glinski, Adam Nicholls	29 December 2007	3038
When the hosting position on the big LA show, "A Dream Comes True," opens up, Lana is determined to be the show's next star, but she comes across some stiff competition from her sexual nemesis, fellow lifestyle host, Pete Sharp. Meanwhile, Alistair works up the nerve to tell Nat how he really feels. And Brooke tries to stop a psychic's prediction from coming true. Tip: If you're thinking of taking a dramatic risk, try do cost–benefit analysis. First work out how much the change will cost to make. Then calculate the benefit you will receive from it. If the benefits outweigh the costs, take the chance. Expert – n/a
39	22	"Go Big or Go Home"	Stephen Hall	Claire Ross Dunn	5 January 2008	3039
All that stands between Lana becoming the next host of the LA show, "A Dream Comes True," is her new co-host, sexual nemesis and true love, Pete Sharp's buffoonery antics. Only, when Lana manages to change Pete's temperament, their chemistry falls flat. Without their sexually mismatched allure, Lana may lose LA altogether. Meanwhile, Nat tests Alistair's new-found commitment to her. And Liz tries her hand at being a stay-at-home mom. Can Lana reignite her hot relationship with Pete in time to make her dreams come true? Tip: Although many types of fear exist, they all boil down to the same phobia: the fear of being out of control. Expert – n/a
