= Jonny Gray (actor) =

Canadian actor (born 1999)

- Born: Jonathan Gray; May 5, 1999 (age 26); London, Ontario, Canada
- Occupation: Actor
- Years active: 2011–present

Jonathan Gray (born May 5, 1999) is a Canadian actor known for the series Max & Shred.

== Career ==
Jonathan Gray was born in Ilderton, Ontario, Canada. In 2012, he won a video contest to become a reporter for the King's Cup Elephant Polo Tournament in Thailand. In 2014, he was cast in the main role in the series Max & Shred on Nickelodeon, playing Max Asher.

== Filmography ==
| Year | Title | Role |
|---|---|---|
| 2013 | Paranormal Witness | Dan (Young) |
| 2014–2015 | Max & Shred | Max Asher |
| 2014 | Last Flight of the Cosmonaut | Edvard |
| 2016 | Bruno & Boots: Go Jump in the Pool | Bruno Walton |
| 2016–2021 | Private Eyes | Liam Benson (18 episodes) |
| 2016–2017 | Ride | Josh Luders |
| 2014–2017 | Annedroids | Zack (7 episodes) |
| 2017 | Bruno & Boots: This Can't Be Happening at Macdonald Hall | Bruno Walton |
| 2017 | Bruno & Boots: The Wizzle War | Bruno Walton |
