= Project Happiness =

- Directed by: John Sorenson
- Produced by: Randy Taran
- Narrated by: Randy Taran
- Release date: 2011
- Country: United States
- Language: English

Project Happiness is a 2011 documentary film created, narrated, and produced by Randy Taran and directed by John Sorenson. The documentary follows students on three continents as they search for the meaning of "lasting happiness".

== Background ==
Project Happiness started as personal story. The film came into being after creator Randy Taran discovered that her daughter was stressed, saying "I want to be happy, I just don't know how". Randy, after speaking with experts, discovered that this situation was more widespread than she had known.

Determined to find a way for her and other parents to speak to their children about happiness, she decided to make a film to educate and initiate the conversation for youth, families and the communities to which they belong.

== Film context ==
The film connects students from three continents – North America, Africa and Asia – and throughout their senior year, they students discuss amongst themselves with several notable individuals one central question: "What brings lasting happiness?" During the filming, the students involved conducted interviews with scientists, celebrities, and world political and spiritual leaders including Richard Gere, Dr. Richard Davidson, Adam Yauch, the late Nirmala Deshpande, Dr. A.P.J Abdul Kalam, George Lucas, and Tenzin Gyatso, the 14th Dalai Lama.

== Reception ==
This film had a sneak preview at the University of Southern California and the Daily Trojan said of the film "Project Happiness is a journey applicable not only to graduating high school students, but people of all ages." The film has been chosen as an Official Selection at the Seoul International Youth Film Festival in Seoul, South Korea as well as the WorldKids International Film Festival in Mumbai, India. Proceeds from the film go to the Project Happiness nonprofit organization.

== See also ==
- Race to Nowhere
- Academically Adrift
- Waiting for "Superman"
