= Siobhan Murphy =

Canadian actress

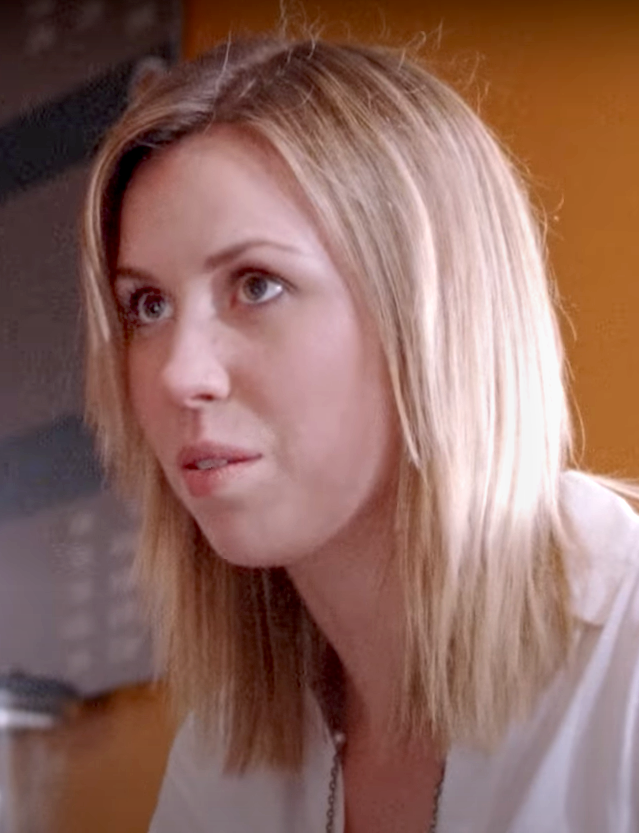
- Murphy in Patient (short film) 2009
- Born: 1984 (age 41–42); Toronto, Ontario, Canada
- Occupation: Actress
- Years active: 2007–present

Siobhan Murphy (born 1984) is a Canadian actress who has appeared in The Smart Woman Survival Guide in 2006, Men with Brooms in 2010, Max & Shred in 2014, Murdoch Mysteries in 2016 and Merry Happy Whatever in 2019.

== Early life ==
From a young age she enjoyed participating at the Young People's Theatre in Toronto. From a young age, Murphy took piano, ballet, voice lessons, but stopped age 16, to focus on acting. Murphy received a BA Fine Arts (Acting) from York University, Toronto, in the Conservatory Acting program, learning classical and technical characteristics of acting performance. She graduated with a degree in Fine Arts (Theatre-Acting) in 2005.

== Career ==
In 2006, six months after graduating from university, Murphy landed a lead role as Liz Duncan (the producer), in The Smart Woman Survival Guide, making her debut screen appearance on television, in a series where for 36 episodes, Murphy honed her acting talent and confidence towards becoming a comedy actress. In 2009, Murphy starred in the short film Patient for which she received a Best Actress award at the Los Angeles Movie Awards.

Murphy appeared in several Hallmark movies, and in 2014, had roles in Max and Shred. In 2016, Murphy made her first appearance as Ruth Newsome in CBC Television's Murdoch Mysteries in season 10 episode 8. In 2019, Murphy was a series regular in the Netflix dark comedy holiday series Merry Happy Whatever alongside Dennis Quaid, who played her father.

== Filmography ==
=== Film ===
Year	Title	Role
2009	Patient (short)	Chanel Hilton
2014	Hellmouth	Fay
2014	15 Minutes (short)	Jill Kincaid
2015	Let's Rap	Hope Black
2015	Spotlight	Intern
2015	No Stranger Than Love	Helen
2017	Filth City	Reporter Myriam Keen
2018	Ode to Rita (short)	Kate
2019	An Assortment of Christmas Tales in No Particular Order	Kate

=== Television film ===
Year	Title	Role
2012	Oh Christmas Tree	Maria
2014	Apple Mortgage Cake	Sherrie
2014	Surrogate's Terror	Sara
2015	Merry Matrimony	Julie
2016	A Perfect Christmas	Annie
2016	A Nutcracker Christmas	Jen
2019	The Sisterhood	Jasmine
2021	Two for the Win	Jenny Green

=== Television series ===
Year	Title	Role	Notes / ref
2006–2007	The Smart Woman Survival Guide	Liz / Elizabeth	Recurring role
2007	Across the River to Motor City	Marie Hart	4 episodes
2010	Men with Brooms	April	Recurring role
2010	The Bridge	Deke's Ex Wife	2 episodes: "God Bless the Child" & "Vexation of Spirit"
2011	Flashpoint	Anna Logan	Episode: "Priority of Life"
2011	Against the Wall	Dee Hoffman	Episode: "Boys Are Back"
2012	Rookie Blue	Becca Nicholson	4 episodes
2013	Saving Hope	Robin Adams	Episode: "Little Piggies"
2013	Less Than Kind	Susan	Episode: "Something Blue"
2013	The Ron James Show	Linda	Episode: "Science"
2013	Cracked	Clara Dwyer	Episode: "The Thump Parade"
2014	Degrassi: The Next Generation	Young Mom	Episode: "Can't Stop This Thing We Started"
2014–2016	Max & Shred	Diane Ackerman	Main role
2015–2017	Filth City	Myriam Keen	4 episodes
2016	Four in the Morning	Girl	Episode: "Four Christs"
2016	Reign	Countess Von Court	Episode: "To the Death"
2016	Orphan Black	Leslie	Episode: "The Stigmata of Progress"
2016	Good Witch	Beth	2 episodes: "Driven" & "Second Time Around"
2016–	Murdoch Mysteries	Ruth Newsome	Recurring role
2017–2018	Upstairs Amy	Veronica Mayhew	Recurring role
2018	The Bold Type	Cleo Williams	4 episodes
2018	Odd Squad	Bonny / Bonnie	2 episodes
2018	Schitt's Creek	Bobbi	Episode: "The Jazzaguy"
2019	Merry Happy Whatever	Patsy	Recurring role
2019	Heartland	Laura	3 episodes: "Long Road Back", "Stress Fractures" & "Diamond in the Rough"
2020	Modern Family	Fiancée	Episode: "Legacy"
2021	Danger Force	Celia / Celia O'Brian	4 episodes
2023	Pretty Freekin Scary	Grim Reaper	Recurring role
2024	Cross	Tania Hightower	Recurring role

== Awards and nominations ==
Year	Award	Category	Work	Result	Ref
2010	Los Angeles Movie Awards, US	Best Actress	Patient	Won	
2018	First Glance Film Festival	Best Ensemble Cast (Web Series) (shared)	Filth City	Nominated	
