= Merry Happy Whatever =

2019 American comedy television series

- Genre: Sitcom
- Created by: Tucker Cawley
- Starring: Dennis Quaid; Bridgit Mendler; Brent Morin; Ashley Tisdale; Siobhan Murphy; Adam Rose; Elizabeth Ho; Hayes MacArthur
- Music by: Gabriel Mann
- Country of origin: United States
- Original language: English
- No. of seasons: 1
- No. of episodes: 8

Production
- Executive producers: Tucker Cawley; Aaron Kaplan; Wendi Trilling; Dana Honor; Dennis Quaid; Pamela Fryman
- Cinematography: Christian La Fountaine
- Editor: Pat Barnett
- Running time: 24–28 minutes
- Production companies: McMonkey Productions; Kapital Entertainment; TrillTV

Original release
- Network: Netflix
- Release: November 28, 2019

Merry Happy Whatever is an American sitcom television series starring Dennis Quaid. The series premiered on Netflix on November 28, 2019, and consisted of eight episodes. In April 2020, the series was canceled after one season.

== Premise ==
Merry Happy Whatever takes place over the week or so around Christmas at the Quinn household. The story follows Don Quinn as he struggles with different stresses of the holidays. They are further complicated as Emmy, the youngest of the family, brings home her boyfriend Matt from California. The pair seeks Don's permission to get married. The controlling patriarch of the family is not pleased because Matt is a struggling musician.

== Cast ==
=== Main ===
- Dennis Quaid as Don Quinn, the hard and conservative patriarch of the Quinn family and a deputy sheriff in Bucks County, Pennsylvania. He always disapproves of his children's spouses and does the same with Matt.
- Bridgit Mendler as Emmy Quinn, Don's youngest daughter who brings her boyfriend home for the holidays
- Brent Morin as Matt, Emmy's boyfriend who is a struggling musician in Los Angeles, constantly being shadowed by Don
- Ashley Tisdale as Kayla, Don's closeted middle daughter, who becomes Matt's friend
- Siobhan Murphy as Patsy, Don's eldest optimistic and super excited daughter
- Adam Rose as Todd, Don's Jewish son-in-law and Patsy's husband, who at all times tries to impress Don unsuccessfully
- Elizabeth Ho as Joy Quinn, Don's daughter-in-law and Sean's wife, who tries to warn Matt that Don will do everything to get him away from Emmy
- Hayes MacArthur as Sean Quinn, Don's dimwitted son who is recently unemployed

=== Recurring ===
- Garcelle Beauvais as Nancy, a nurse at Morristown Urgent Care and Don's love interest
- Mason Davis as Sean Jr., Sean's eldest son who recently became an atheist
- Lucas Jaye as Donny, Sean's younger son

=== Guest ===
- Tyler Ritter as Alan, Kayla's estranged husband who is planning to divorce her.
- Chris Myers as Bryan, Nancy's son who disapproves the relationship between his mother and Don.
- Dan Castellaneta as Ted Boseman, Don's friend who is forced into offering Emmy a great new job after Don did not arrest him after committing a crime.
- Paul Dooley as Grandpa Jack, Don's father-in-law who openly dislikes Don and believes he was never good enough for his daughter.

== Production ==
Filming began on May 21, 2019, and ended on July 24, 2019.

=== Filming ===
Merry Happy Whatever was filmed at Radford Studio Center in Studio City, California but it is set in Philadelphia, Pennsylvania.

== Episodes ==
No.	Title	Directed by	Written by	Original release date
1	"Welcome, Matt"	Pamela Fryman	Tucker Cawley	November 28, 2019
Emmy Quinn is back in Philly from LA with her boyfriend to meet her family. Matt is determined to impress Emmy's crazy family, led by Don, whom everyone is scared of. When Emmy brings Matt home he is met with different forms of drama. Emmy's sister, Kayla, is broken up by her husband in front of the entire family. He befriends Joy and Todd, the in-laws of the family who call themselves the Outlaw In-Laws, and meet up at the bar. Don is pressuring Emmy to move back home and take a job he knows of. Matt asks Don for his blessing to marry Emmy, which he denies. Emmy's sister, Patsy, is trying to be their mother, who has died, for everyone. She is trying to get pregnant with Todd. Sean and Joy's son tells them that he is now an atheist, which will bother the uptight Don. Matt, trying to win over Don, volunteers to put up the Christmas lights on the roof with Don. He accidentally staples Don's head and falls off the roof unconscious. The whole family goes to the hospital. Don meets his love interest, Nancy, while Matt vows to win over Don. It is revealed Don forced an "old friend" to give Emmy an irrefusable job offer so he'll won't arrest him.
2	"Harmony"	Pamela Fryman	David Holden	November 28, 2019
Matt learns he has been chosen for a huge gig. The Outlaws meet at the bar where Joy sees that Sean isn’t really at work, who later confesses to her that he lost his job and has been scared to tell anyone, including Don. Kayla puts her sadness into organizing the family’s yearly caroling night. Matt wants to gain Don’s blessing, so he quits his gig to go caroling, upsetting Emmy. Emmy meets about her new job, and loves the offer. Matt takes Don to the hospital to flirt with Nancy, which Don is rusty at. Todd and Patsy are nervous about Patsy still not becoming pregnant. Sean tells Don about his job, which makes him learn to be supportive.
3	"Interference"	Gloria Calderón Kellett	Gracie Glassmeyer	November 28, 2019
The family spends their day decorating the tree and watching the game, a decade long tradition. Don breaks the tradition to watch the game with Nancy, who he comes on strong to, and clashes with her son. Patsy wants to become the one to put the star on the tree. Kayla confesses to Matt about her feelings for women. Emmy finds out Joy has a smoking problem and helps her quit, which hinders her intention to have sex with Matt in her room. Todd tries to fit in with Sean and Don during the game. Don returns home for tradition and lets Patsy put the star on the tree.
4	"Happy Mall-idays"	Pamela Fryman	Ali Schouten	November 28, 2019
Don takes the family to the mall to search for a gift for Nancy. Kayla tries to flirt with the female barista, which does not go well. Emmy and Matt clash over their money issues, with Emmy believing Matt is too loose with what little money he has. Joy gets into a wreck at the mall parking lot with an old lady, who helps her realize to appreciate her family. Todd and Patsy must wait in line for a Santa Baby Picture, while Patsy ends up sick. The family learns that Don is dating again and interested in Nancy, who are supportive to him. Patsy and Todd learn that Patsy is pregnant and plan to tell the family the next day.
5	"Twas the Night Before the 4th Night of Hanukkah"	Phill Lewis	Ajay Sahgal	November 28, 2019
The family prepares for Midnight Mass, which Don wants to go perfectly, while worrying about if Nancy got her gift. Matt and Emmy clash over life plans. Kayla has Emmy give her a makeover, wanting to be a new person. Patsy and Todd announce her pregnancy. Emmy finds the ring Matt is planning to propose to her with, while Matt becomes unsure he wants to marry Emmy with the troubles they have been recently having. Sean Jr. announces his beliefs. He initially decides to go forward with it, but finds out Emmy has kept her job offer a secret, and changes his mind.
6	"Merry Ex-Mas"	Betsy Thomas	Richard Brandon Manus	November 28, 2019
Christmas Day- Nancy gives Don a Christmas gift, to which Don overreacts to and scares away Nancy. Emmy waits for Matt's proposal. The family is joined by Margaret's father who clashes with Don. Matt finds out about Emmy's job offer and worries about whether or not to propose. Because of her pregnancy, Patsy is sickened easily and cannot cook the family brunch she wanted to make, so Joy must do it. Alan reunites with Kayla. At the gift exchange, Matt does not propose, embarrassing Emmy. Realizing they are two different people, Matt and Emmy break up.
7	"Christmas Break"	Phill Lewis	Talia Bernstein	November 28, 2019
Kayla and Alan try to reconnect, with Alan wanting to have sex, but Kayla does not. Matt moves in with Joy and Sean, who welcome his help. Sean decides to do something he loves with his next career, buying a food truck, and decides to sell the family's eggies to construction workers. Don and Nancy go on their first date, but Nancy feels he is not over Margaret. Todd and Patsy clash over what religion they will raise their baby, while Emmy seeks comfort in her breakup with Kayla. Alan, realizing Kayla won't be with him truly, ends the marriage once and for all. Matt decides to get serious about his music and move back to LA and pursue a solo career.
8	"Ring In The New Year"	Pamela Fryman	Tucker Cawley	November 28, 2019
Matt has gone back to LA after breaking up with Emmy, who is mad at Don for running off Matt and never giving him his blessing. Joy and Todd end up confronting Don telling him that he micro-manages his family, which sends him to LA to try to bring Matt and Emmy together again. Patsy and Todd worry that they will not be good enough parents in the new year, after losing a puzzle piece. Emmy finds out how Don got her new job, which leads her to leverage her old job to get a better position - which is in London. Don cannot convince Matt to return to Philly. Matt finds the last puzzle piece, which makes him realize he and Emmy are a perfect fit. At the New Years Eve Party, Don reunites with Nancy and Kayla comes out to her family, who support her. Matt returns and proposes to Emmy who accepts and they announce that they will move to London together. The entire family brings the newly engaged couple to the airport, with Don letting them know they'll be waiting for their wedding.

== See also ==
- List of Christmas films
