= Elizabeth Ho =

American actress best known for playing Jenny in Disjointed

- Born: San Francisco, California, U.S.
- Education: University of Southern California, Bachelor of Arts in the theater
- Occupation: Actress
- Years active: 2007–present
- Spouse: Ira Heinichen (m. 2014)

Elizabeth Ho is an American actress.

== Early life and career ==
Ho was born and raised in San Francisco, California. Her mother is actress and dancer Jennifer Ann Lee, who appeared in a number of Broadway productions including A Chorus Line and Jesus Christ Superstar. She attended Crystal Springs Uplands School in Hillsborough, California. Ho first studied business at the University of Southern California, but left for a year and returned to enroll in the school's theater program, earning a Bachelor of Arts in theater.

Since 2007, Ho has guest starred in the television series Women's Murder Club, Castle, Grey's Anatomy, Two and a Half Men, Miami Medical and played the lead role in the independent short film, Kilo. She played Rhonda Cheng on Melissa & Joey and Debbie Lee on Rake. She has also narrated over 750 videos on Study.com, on a variety of subjects from science to music.

== Filmography ==
Film and television roles
Year	Title	Role	Notes
2007	Women's Murder Club	Yuki Castellano	Episode: "Welcome to the Club"
2009	Castle	Amy Saunders	Episode: "Deep in Death"
2010	Grey's Anatomy	Molly	Episode: "Push"
2010	Kilo	Min Lee	Short film
2010	Two and a Half Men	Jasmine	Episode: "I Called Him Magoo"
2010	Miami Medical	Lori Wilson	Episode: "Medicine Man"
2010	Melissa & Joey	Rhonda Cheng	Recurring role, 5 episodes
2011	Bones	Staci Barret	Episode: "The Daredevil in the Mold"
2012	NCIS	NCIS Analyst Emma Park	Episode: "Playing with Fire"
2013	2 Broke Girls	Ms. Yi	Episode: "And the Temporary Distraction"
2014	Lovesick	Tanya	Film
2014	Rake	Debbie Lee	2 episodes
2014	Life Partners	Valerie	Film
2014	Kirby Buckets	Kourtney Kang	Episode: "Art Attack"
2015	Marry Me	Brianna	Episode: "Dead Me"
2016	Fifty Shades of Black	Yuki	Film
2017–18	Disjointed	Jenny	Main role, 20 episodes
2018	Forever	Melanie Park	Episode: "The Lake Horse"
2019	Merry Happy Whatever	Joy Quinn	Main role, 8 episodes
2020	Broke	Christine	Episode: "Soccer"
2021	Call Me Kat	Dr. Marshall	Episode: "Eggs"
