= The Smart Woman Survival Guide =

- Created by: Al Magee
- Starring: Tricia Braun; Laura McLean; Siobhan Murphy; Joanne Alderson; Riley Gilchrist; Ryan V. Hays; Adam Seybold; Jean-Paul Saurine
- Country of origin: Canada
- No. of episodes: 39 (list of episodes)

Production
- Executive producer: Al Magee
- Running time: 22 minutes

Original release
- Network: W Network
- Release: 4 September 2006 – 5 January 2008

The Smart Woman Survival Guide is a Canadian situation comedy, filmed in Toronto, that aired from 4 September 2006 to 5 January 2008. It aired on the W Network and CosmoTV. The show was originally conceived as a two-act show that grew to four acts with a teaser and tag.

== Premise ==
The Smart Woman Survival Guide is a half-hour hybrid that is part lifestyle and part comedy. Set around a Martha Stewart Living-type show called Smart Woman, the 'ironed curtain' is lifted to reveal what happens behind the scenes and follow the women who bond over their work, lives and loves.

The series stars Tricia Braun as Lana Pearson, the demanding host of Smart Woman, and her trusty staff, producer Liz (Siobhan Murphy), associate producer Brooke (Joanne Alderson), and researcher Natalie (Laura McLean). As the women attempt to navigate the challenges of their personal and professional lives, the audience is presented with tips, how-tos and information for today's “smart woman”. When the Smart Women research segments for the show, they interact with real world experts who make guest appearances on the Smart Woman show. These include athletes, celebrity chefs and bestselling authors.

== Cast ==
- Tricia Braun – Lana Pearson, the host of Smart Woman
- Siobhan Murphy – Liz Duncan, the producer
- Laura McLean – Natalie Knowles, the researcher
- Joanne Alderson – Brooke Patterson, the associate producer
- Riley Gilchrist – Alistair, Lana's assistant
- Ryan V. Hays – Phil, the IT guy
- Adam Seybold – Reggie, the make-up artist

=== Notable guest-starring cast ===
- Jean-Paul Saurine – Steve Duncan, Liz's husband
- Megan Hutchins – Geneva, Lana's 19-year-old niece
- Boomer Phillips – Pete Sharp, Lana's nemesis and host of a rival show
- Brad Hampton – John Smith

=== Guest experts ===
- Alexandra Robbins, New York Times bestselling author of Conquering Your Quarterlife Crisis, The Overachievers, Pledged, and Secrets of the Tomb.
- Conrad Leinemann, Beach Volleyball Olympian, finished 9th at the Sydney Olympic Games, and is a Pan Am Games Gold Medalist, with a 100+ km/h serve.
- Mark Heese, Beach Volleyball Olympian. Mark brought home Canada's first medal in beach volleyball in the Atlanta Olympic Games in 1996.
- Marc Dunn, Beach Volleyball Olympian, finished 17th at the Atlanta Olympic Games.
- Craig Kielburger, Founder and Chair of Free the Children, and three-time Nobel Peace Prize nominee.
- Barbara Coloroso, internationally recognized parenting expert and author of four best selling parental advice books: Kids are worth it; Parenting Through Crisis, Helping Kids in Times of Loss, Grief, and Inner Discipline; The Bully, the Bullied, and the Bystander; Just Because it’s not Wrong Doesn’t Make It Right.
- Rick Gallop, Author of The G. I. Diet.
- Rob Stewart, Director of award-winning environmental feature film documentary, Sharkwater.

== Production ==
The series was edited at Visual Fixations. Audio post production and 5.1 surround mixing for the 39 episodes was completed at Rhythm Division. The re-recording mixer was Jim Longo, with additional editing on season 3 by Andrea Cyr. Music for season 1, as well as the show theme were composed by Tom Third. For seasons 2 and 3 the music was composed at Rhythm Division by Kevan Staples.

Executive Producer Al Magee was the creative consultant for Showcase Network, contributing to numerous shows, including Slings & Arrows, Kink, Naked Josh, Show Me Yours, Kenny vs. Spenny, and Trailer Park Boys. Series composer Kevan Staples was a member of the Canadian new wave rock band, Rough Trade. He has won 4 Juno Awards and a Genie Award.

The photo of Liz and Steve on Liz's desk is a real photo of Siobhan Murphy (Liz) and Jean-Paul Saurine (Steve) taken years ago, when the two were classmates at theatre school.

Thirteen episodes were ordered for the first season. Before these had aired, twenty-six additional episodes were ordered by W Network.
