= Bruno & Boots (film series) =

Canadian series of television films

- Based on: Macdonald Hall by Gordon Korman
- Teleplay by: Adam Barken (1–2); Mike McPhaden (2–3)
- Directed by: Vivieno Caldinelli
- Starring: Jonny Gray; Callan Potter; Joshua Kilimnik; Drew Haytaoglu; Isiah Lea; Hannah Vandenbygaart; Kiana Madeira; Scott Thompson; Caroline Rhea; Peter Keleghan; Matt Baram (3); Kathleen Phillips (3)
- Composer: Shawn Pierce
- Country of origin: Canada
- Original language: English

Production
- Executive producers: Nat Abraham; Ira Levy; Mike McGuigan; Peter Williamson
- Producers: Anthony Leo; Andrew Rosen
- Cinematography: D. Gregor Hagey
- Editors: Paul G. Day (1); Aren Hansen (2–3)
- Running time: 270 minutes
- Production company: Aircraft Pictures

Original release
- Network: YTV
- Release: April 1, 2016 – April 1, 2017

Bruno & Boots is a Canadian series of television films, based on Gordon Korman's Macdonald Hall series of young adult novels. Directed by Vivieno Caldinelli, the films were produced by Aircraft Pictures for YTV, and star Callan Potter as Boots and Jonny Gray as Bruno.

The first film in the series, Bruno & Boots: Go Jump in the Pool!, aired on April 1, 2016, while the second and third films in the series, Bruno & Boots: This Can't Be Happening at Macdonald Hall and Bruno & Boots: The Wizzle War, aired on April 1, 2017. This Can't Be Happening at Macdonald Hall received a Canadian Screen Award nomination for Best Limited Series or Program at the 6th Canadian Screen Awards in 2018.
