= Race to Nowhere =

- Directed by: Vicki Abeles; Jessica Congdon
- Written by: Maimone Attia
- Produced by: Vicki Abeles
- Cinematography: Maimone Attia; Sophia E. Constantinou
- Edited by: Jessica Congdon
- Music by: Mark Adler
- Production company: Reel Link Films
- Release date: September 10, 2009 (Mill Valley Film Festival)
- Running time: 85 minutes
- Country: United States
- Languages: English; Spanish; Mandarin

Race to Nowhere is a 2009 documentary film written by Maimone Attia and directed by Vicki Abeles and Jessica Congdon.

== Background ==
Director Vicki Abeles made this movie after hearing a case of a 13-year-old girl who committed suicide due to the pressures of schoolwork. This made Abeles think of her own children and how the educational system could be affecting them mentally. She was inspired to inform people and parents of the rising issue of academic stress in children, and decided to direct a film showcasing the causes and effects of these problems for more awareness.

Abeles started to make major changes at home, but the problem seemed more systemic. She heard similar stories about the unintended consequences upon kids of today’s education system and culture. The difficulty at first seemed to center on one critical issue: the plight of students driven to acquire the strong performance requirements for selection by top universities for enrollment to ensure rewarding careers. The film recounts the story of a local high school girl who committed suicide under fear of academic failure.

== Synopsis ==
Race to Nowhere is a film containing stories of young people across the country who have been pushed to the brink, educators who are burned out and worried that students aren’t developing the skills they need, and parents who are trying to do what’s best for their children.

== Reception ==
Since its release in 2010, Race to Nowhere has garnered a wide range of praise and criticism. Former Assistant Secretary of Education Diane Ravitch has called it “a compelling film about the stress that kids today experience.” Trip Gabriel of The New York Times called it “a must-see movie.”

In a review for Slant Magazine, Jesse Cataldo gave the film a rating of two stars out of four and criticised the film's lack of objectivity and "occasional lapses into hysterical worrywarting", but called it "the rare documentary that provides legitimate answers to the questions it raises". Jeannette Catsoulis of The New York Times was critical of the director's attempt to make a "single, clear narrative" out of such a large topic, but praised her compassion. Writing for The Village Voice, Ella Taylor said that the director "sheds little new light" on why many parents, teachers and politicians are in favor of extensive homework and testing of high school students.

== Distribution ==
Though Abeles has been approached by major distributors offering to place her movie in commercial theaters, the filmmaker has chosen to distribute the film directly. Price of the movie depends on license, which ranges from individual home use to group screening in communities, education organizations, professional associations and civic groups. The individual household license has fixed price and includes a DVD disc, cost of other licenses is negotiated for each screening.

== Related developments ==
Vicki Abeles continues to explore the theme of school students being overwhelmed by homework and needless pressure.

== See also ==
- Academically Adrift
- Waiting for "Superman"
- American Teacher
- "Project Happiness"
- The Overachievers
- Kyoiku mama
