= Jake Fried =

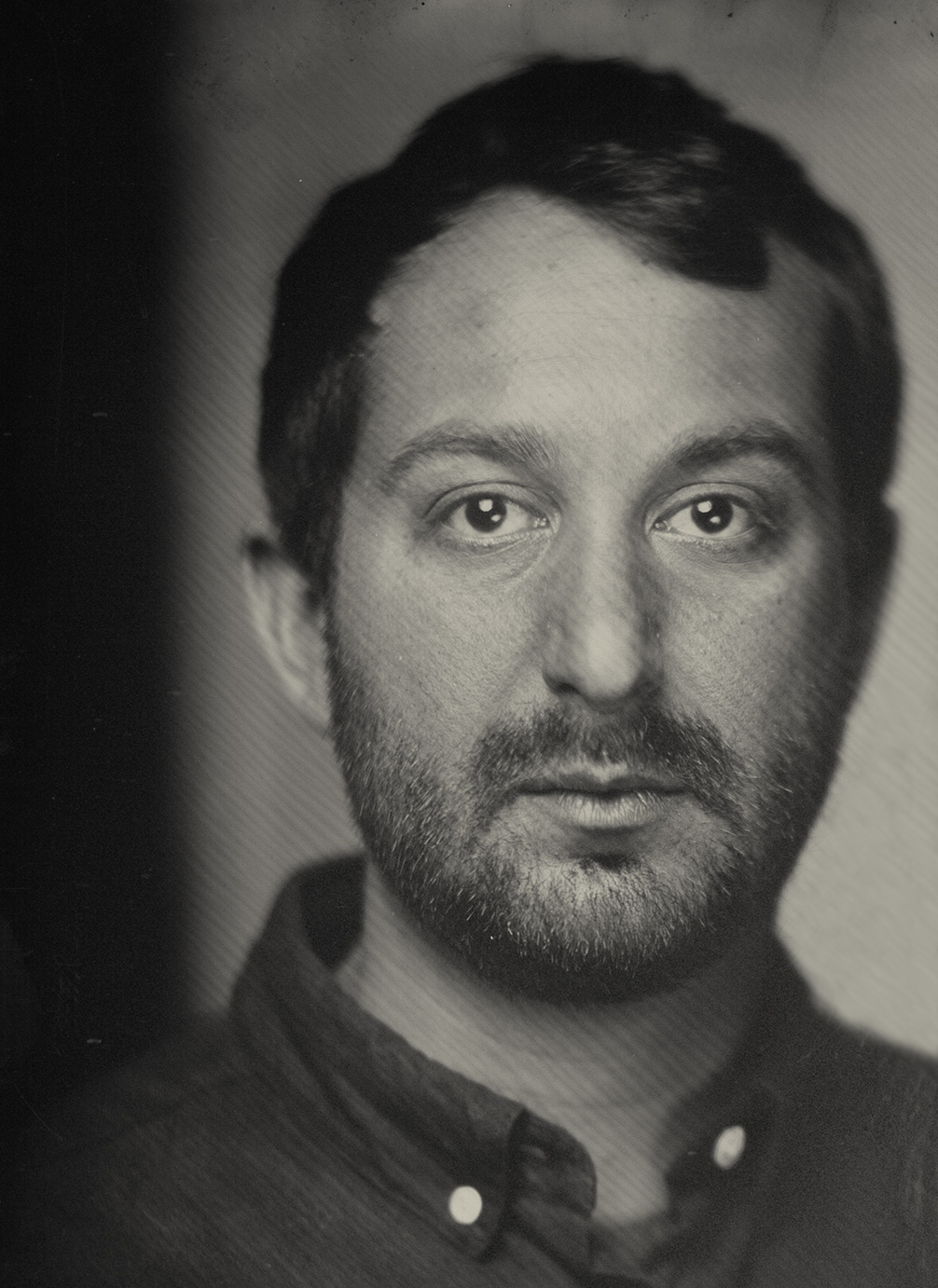
- Jake Fried in 2016
- Notable work: The Deep End, Waiting Room
- Style: Stop motion animation
- Website: inkwood.net

Jake Fried is an artist who began his career as a painter. As he went through the process of layering and modifying images, he became interested in the way the image changed over time. Thus, he changed direction to become an animator. Fried works with ink and white correction fluid, sometimes adding gouache, collage and even coffee to generate hallucinatory stop motion animations. He modifies and photographs the artwork over and over to create an image that evolves rapidly over the course of the short (typically one-minute long) video. His animations have been shown internationally, including at the Tate Modern and the Sundance Film Festival.

He currently teaches at the Massachusetts College of Art & Design and the Museum of Fine Arts, Boston.
