= Alexandra Robbins =

American journalist and author

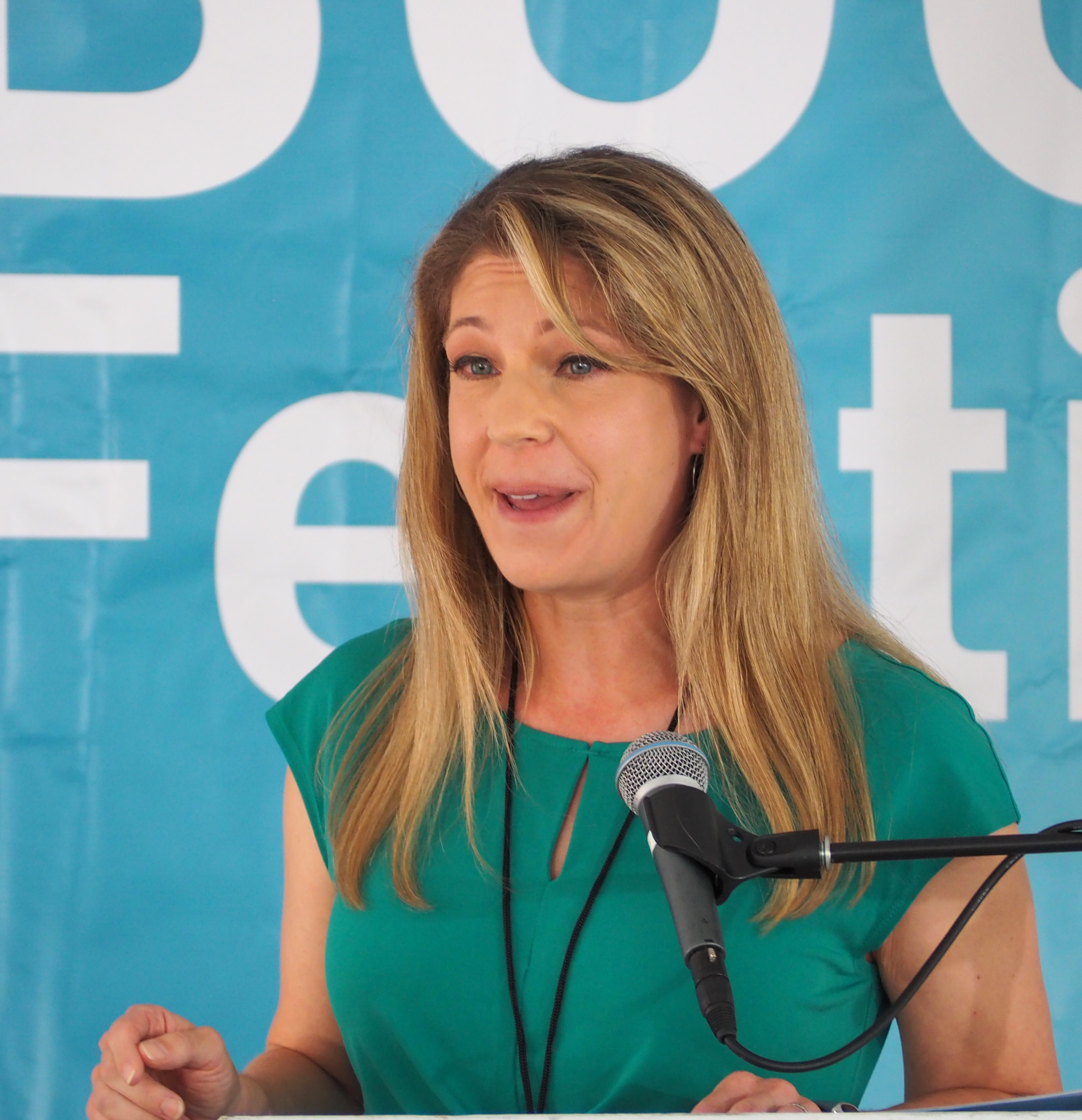
- Robbins in 2023
- Born: United States
- Citizenship: United States
- Education: Yale University
- Writing career
- Language: English
- Genres: Non-fiction, journalism

Alexandra Robbins is an American journalist, lecturer, and author. Her books focus on young adults, education, and modern college life. Five of her books have been New York Times Bestsellers.

== Education ==
She graduated from Walt Whitman High School in Bethesda, Maryland in 1994 where she was editor-in-chief of her high school newspaper, the Black & White.

She graduated summa cum laude from Yale University in 1998 where she was a member of Scroll and Key.

== Career ==
=== Writing ===
Robbins has won several awards for her writing. Her book The Geeks Shall Inherit The Earth won the Best Nonfiction Book of the Year Award in the 2011 Goodreads Choice Awards. Robbins also received a Books for a Better Life Award in 2012.

In 2014, Robbins was the winner of the John Bartlow Martin Award for Public Interest Magazine Journalism. Her article, "Children Are Dying," investigated a shortage of critical nutrients that premature babies and other patients need to survive. One week after Washingtonian Magazine published Robbins’ article, the FDA agreed to import the nutrients from other countries.

On May 28, 2015, Robbins wrote a New York Times op-ed about inadequate nurse staffing at hospitals in the United States.

She has also written for a variety of publications, including Vanity Fair, The New Yorker, Los Angeles Times, The Atlantic Monthly, The Washington Post, USA Today, Cosmopolitan, and Salon.com.

=== Bush educational record ===
Along with author Jane Mayer, she broke the story about President Bush's college grades and SATs in The New Yorker in June 2000. The article got such media attention that reporters called to interview her and asked what her SAT scores were. She has not made her scores known publicly.

Her 2002 book, "Secrets of the Tomb", a social history of secret societies at Yale, features Skull and Bones, and was timely given the membership of George W. Bush and George H. W. Bush in the organization, and then more so when John Kerry, another member, was the Democratic Party's 2004 presidential nominee.

== In media ==
Robbins was a guest on the satirical program The Colbert Report on August 9 of 2006, during which Colbert challenged claims Robbins makes in The Overachievers, citing some observations of Robbins' own experience, while she countered with observations about systemic problems resulting from a highly competitive system, the cheating that is endemic to competition and problems with standardized testing, arguing that the aforementioned conditions teach misplaced values.

Robbins has also appeared on 60 Minutes, The Oprah Winfrey Show, Coast To Coast AM, The Today Show, Paula Zahn Now, The View, CBS Early Show, The Smart Woman Survival Guide, The O'Reilly Factor, and Anderson Cooper 360°, and networks including CNN, NPR, the BBC, MSNBC, CNBC, C-SPAN, and the History Channel.

== Books ==
- Robbins, Alexandra (2023) The Teachers: A Year Inside America’s Most Vulnerable, Important Profession, Dutton
- Robbins, Alexandra (2019). Fraternity: An Inside Look at a Year of College Boys Becoming Men. New York: Dutton. ISBN 978-1-1019-8672-1.
- Robbins, Alexandra (2015). The Nurses: A Year of Secrets, Drama, and Miracles with the Heroes of the Hospital. New York: Workman Publishing Company. ISBN 978-0-7611-7171-3.
- Robbins, Alexandra (2011). The Geeks Shall Inherit the Earth: Popularity, Quirk Theory, and Why Outsiders Thrive After High School. New York: Hyperion. ISBN 978-1-4013-0202-3.
- Robbins, Alexandra (2006). The Overachievers: The Secret Lives of Driven Kids. New York: Hyperion. ISBN 1-4013-0201-7.
- Robbins, Alexandra (2004). Pledged: The Secret Life of Sororities. New York: Hyperion. ISBN 1-4013-0046-4.
- Robbins, Alexandra (2004). Conquering Your Quarterlife Crisis: Advice from Twentysomethings who Have Been There and Survived. New York: Perigee Book. ISBN 0-399-53038-X.
- Robbins, Alexandra (2002). Secrets of the Tomb: Skull and Bones, the Ivy League, and the Hidden Paths of Power. Boston: Little, Brown. ISBN 0-316-72091-7.
- Robbins, Alexandra; Abby Wilner (2001). Quarterlife Crisis: The Unique Challenges of Life in Your Twenties. New York: J.P. Tarcher/Putnam. ISBN 1-58542-106-5.
