= The Overachievers =

- Author: Alexandra Robbins
- Language: English
- Genre: non-fiction
- Publisher: Hyperion
- Publication date: August 8, 2006
- Publication place: United States
- Media type: Print (hardback and paperback)
- Pages: 448 pp (hardcover).
- ISBN: 1-4013-0201-7

The Overachievers or The Overachievers: The Secret Lives of Driven Kids is a non-fiction book written by Alexandra Robbins. Using the example of some American teenagers, it centers upon overachievement in high school, emphasizing its negative effect in modern American society. It specifically examines the belief that being successful depends on attaining the perfect GPA and being accepted by the "right" college.

Throughout the work, the author follows eight students who have a lifestyle where overachieving takes priority. She occasionally interrupts to address issues that affect one of the teens and explains its negative effect on an international scale. She discusses how social pressure from parents and friends, drugs, drinking, and suicide play a part in high school teenager's lives.

Robbins puts the No Child Left Behind Act in a negative light by placing an emphasis on standardized tests and claims the college admissions process in the United States to be corrupt and inefficient.

== Characters ==
- "AP" Frank (later just Frank) is a Korean/white college freshman attending Harvard. As a high school student, he had to deal with horrifying parental pressure to succeed and to come out on the top. His Korean mother's traditional Asian upbringing and values clashes against those of his white father.
- Audrey is a Hispanic junior who deals with perfectionism throughout the book. She works vigorously (often on weekends) on a physics project consisting of building a bridge out of toothpicks that can hold a certain amount of weight. After crafting it, she leaves it in the physics classroom, only to discover later that it is gone. Her teacher gives her an A, but Audrey still wants first place in the competition.
- C.J., a white student perceived as the class flirt, has to deal with misconceptions about being an overachiever.
- Julie is a white, self-driven overachiever who runs cross country. She fools people into thinking she is confident, perfect, and has everything under control, despite harboring uncertainties about her future. Julie finally relaxes when she arrives at Dartmouth College. Instead of taking herself so seriously and worrying so much about her image, she adopts the mantra "my life is a joke" and thus becomes immune to awkward situations.
- Pete is labeled an underachieving "meathead" who has the skills to succeed but not the motivation. His image and parents' financial issues have been stifling him.
- Sam is perceived as the teacher's pet and an overachiever who feels that if he doesn't get in a name-brand school, his hard work in high school would be wasted.
- Taylor is popular, but she is also friends with the "smart kids" and frequently has trouble balancing these two worlds. She often hides her intelligence from her "popular" friends, knowing that they will judge her for re-taking the SAT when she got a 1490 [including a perfect score on the math section] on her first try.
- Ryland is perceived as the slacker and struggles with dropping grades, too many extracurricular activities, and a form of ADD that requires Ritalin as treatment. This causes conflicts with his mother, who is convinced that he doesn't need the drug.
- The Stealth Overachiever is a mysterious junior who flies under the radar and, as we later discover, is someone familiar.

== See also ==
- Race to Nowhere
