= Max & Shred =

Children's comedy television series

- Genre: Comedy
- Created by: Josh Greenbaum; Ben McMillan
- Starring: Jonny Gray; Jake Goodman; Saara Chaudry; Emilia McCarthy; Jean-Michel Le Gal; Siobhan Murphy
- Countries of origin: Canada; United States
- Original language: English
- No. of seasons: 2
- No. of episodes: 39

Production
- Executive producers: Joan Lambur; George Doty IV; Ira Levy; Michael McGuigan; Peter Williamson; Nat Abraham; George Ellis Doty
- Producer: Jim Corston
- Camera setup: Multi-camera
- Running time: 22 minutes
- Production companies: Breakthrough Entertainment; Boathouse Entertainment; YTV; Nickelodeon Productions

Original release
- Network: YTV (Canada); Nickelodeon (U.S.); Nicktoons (U.S.)
- Release: October 6, 2014 – March 31, 2016

Max & Shred is a comedy television series produced by Breakthrough Entertainment in Canada, with Nickelodeon and YTV involvement throughout the production process. It was created by Josh Greenbaum and Ben McMillan. The series aired on YTV in Canada. In the United States, the series aired on Nickelodeon from October 6, 2014, to July 11, 2015, before moving to Nicktoons from March 21 to March 31, 2016. The series stars Jonny Gray, Jake Goodman, Saara Chaudry, Emilia McCarthy, Jean-Michel Le Gal, and Siobhan Murphy.

== Premise ==
The series chronicles the comedic and unlikely friendship between Max Asher, a celebrity snowboarder, and Alvin "Shred" Ackerman, a science whiz-child, who become roommates and instant friends when Max moves to Colorado to train for the Winter Cup.

== Cast ==
=== Main ===
- Jonny Gray as Max Asher
- Jake Goodman as Alvin "Shred" Ackerman
- Saara Chaudry as Jill "Howie" Finch
- Emilia McCarthy as Abby Ackerman
- Jean-Michel Le Gal as Lloyd Ackerman
- Siobhan Murphy as Diane Ackerman

=== Recurring ===
- Tucker Bowman as Junk
- Hannah Cheesman as Kaylee Carpenter
- Stephen Joffe as Peter
- Devyn Nekoda as Wendy Chong
- Amariah Faulkner as Juliet
- Katie Douglas as Melanie

== Production ==
The series was created by Josh Greenbaum and Ben McMillan, and was executive produced by George Doty IV, along with Joan Lambur, Ira Levy, Peter Williamson, Nat Abraham, and Michael McGuigan. It was produced by Toronto's Breakthrough Entertainment, with Nickelodeon and YTV involvement throughout the production process, and support from the Shaw Rocket Fund. On February 25, 2015, it was announced that the series was renewed for a second season.

== Episodes ==
=== Series overview ===
Season	Episodes		Originally released		
Season	Episodes		First released	Last released	Network
1	26		October 6, 2014	July 11, 2015	Nickelodeon
2	13	8	March 21, 2016	March 31, 2016	Nicktoons
2	13	5	—	—	Streaming

=== Season 1 (2014–15) ===
No. overall	No. in season	Title	Directed by	Written by	Original release date	Prod. code	U.S. viewers (millions)
1	1	"The Big Hair Switch 360"	Steve Wright	Josh Greenbaum & Ben McMillan	October 6, 2014	101	1.15
Max Asher, a superstar snowboarder, moves to Colorado, into the home of Alvin Ackerman and his family, to train for the winter cup. Alvin becomes jealous of Max and the attention that he receives. Things take a turn for the worse when Max's agent accidentally takes Alvin to a snowboarding challenge, believing him to be Max. Meanwhile, Max has to fill in for Alvin at a science fair with Alvin's friend Howie. Later, Alvin does a 50-foot drop, intended for Max to do, and the boys then make up. Max gives Alvin a nickname, "Shred", which makes him feel better.
2	2	"The Lien Love Triangle"	Steve Wright	Jennifer Daley	October 7, 2014	104	1.33
3	3	"The 1080 Room Twist"	Adam Weissman	George Doty IV	October 8, 2014	102	1.19
Max and Alvin become annoyed with each other as roommates. Abby and the boys discover that Lloyd has kept a secret den room hidden from them by passing it off as a dangerous closet that should never be entered. Lloyd had kept the room a secret so he could work in there alone on his wizard novel, for which he has only written one page in three years. Max and Alvin both want the room, as does Abby, who wishes to turn it into a closet for her clothes. Lloyd is forced to choose which child should receive the room. Each of the children bribe Lloyd with gifts to increase their chances of getting the room, but they realize he will not make a decision so he can keep receiving gifts. The children enlist Howie's help in deciding who gets the room. Howie brings the children into the den and explains that the last person to leave the room should be the one to get it. Abby quickly concedes the contest when she realizes she left her cellphone in the living room and leaves to retrieve it. Howie and Abby then help Lloyd with his novel. The next morning, Max and Alvin realize that regardless of who wins the den, they will still get their own bedroom. However, Lloyd announces that he needs his den again to complete his novel.
4	4	"The Nosebonk Nemesis"	Steve Wright	Jennifer Daley	October 9, 2014	107	0.95
Max prepares to compete against his nemesis, snowboarder Yuud Nuuderuud. Max insists to Alvin that Yuud is a cheater who has sabotaged previous snowboarding competitions to defeat him. Abby begins dating Yuud, who appears friendly; they both convince Alvin that Max is simply mistaken. Max is upset when the family invites Yuud to their house for dinner. Later, Alvin discovers through his surveillance camera footage that Yuud has sabotaged Max's snowboard during the night. Alvin and Abby warn Max before the snowboard race begins. Abby interrupts a live interview that Yuud is giving so she can reveal his cheating tactics. Meanwhile, Alvin repeatedly declines Kaylee's request to leave a box of rats in the kitchen of her competitor, Ken and Sherry's Fro-Yo Hut.
5	5	"The Snow Day Variety Method"	Don McCutcheon	Josh Greenbaum & Ben McMillan	October 14, 2014	109	1.39
Alvin becomes nervous when a blizzard hits Blizzard Springs. Alvin tells Max that Lloyd enjoys putting on a variety show whenever the power goes out during a blizzard. Part of the show includes Alvin being forced by Lloyd to dress up in a Squiggle Puppy outfit and sing a song. Abby invites her boyfriend, a bad poetry writer named Derek, over to the house to end her relationship with him. Max, Derek, and the Ackermans become snowed in at the house. Howie tunnels her way through the snow to make sure Max is okay, but the tunnel collapses, trapping her at the house as well. When the power goes out, Lloyd begins setting up for his variety show, and insists that Alvin sing while dressed in the Squiggle Puppy outfit. Max freaks out at the idea of being trapped, so Alvin decides to sing in his Squiggle Puppy outfit to calm Max down. Max then tells Alvin that he was never actually worried about being trapped, and that this was his plan to help Alvin get over his embarrassment of a Squiggle Puppy video several years before.
6	6	"The Frontside Hero Slide"	Don McCutcheon	Ethan Banville	October 15, 2014	106	1.02
Alvin invents a device that can turn anything into water. Alvin intends to enter the device in a competition so he can gain entry into a science society called Think Easy, allowing him to meet scientist Carl DeLawn Lewis, who was Alvin's inspiration for Mr. P's appearance. Alvin's nemesis Wendy Chong damages his device with an electromagnetic pulse. Max then sneaks Alvin and himself into a party for Think Easy while disguised as German scientists. Alvin is accepted into Think Easy after Max informs Lewis of his scientific achievements. Howie and Diane disagree on how to train Abby for an upcoming marathon run. Abby eventually fakes an injury so Howie and Diane will leave her alone, allowing her to train on her own.
7	7	"The Blunt Stall Auction Flail"	Steve Wright	Ethan Banville	October 16, 2014	103	1.36
8	8	"The Alt-Ctrl-Shifty Laptop Burn"	Don McCutcheon	Mike Kiss	October 20, 2014	110	1.12
Absent: Siobhan Murphy as Diane Ackerman, Jean-Michel Le Gal as Lloyd Ackerman
9	9	"The Half-Cab Robot Baby Bonk"	Larry A. McLean	Ethan Banville	October 21, 2014	111	1.25
Max and Alvin must take care of a fake baby for a school project. Abby, who wants to babysit so she can save enough money to buy a convertible car, takes the baby around town to demonstrate to parents that she can be responsible. When Max and Alvin find Abby, they fight for the baby and accidentally tear it apart, an incident that is caught on video by several bystanders. Although Max and Alvin manage to put the baby back together, their teacher reveals to them an online video of the baby being torn apart. However, he passes them because they worked together to reassemble the baby. Absent: Jean-Michel Le Gal as Lloyd Ackerman
10	10	"The Stalefish Double Flip"	Larry A. McLean	Jennifer Daley	October 22, 2014	112	1.04
Alvin becomes jealous after Max accompanies Lloyd to a father-son work event, which Alvin initially declined to attend. Alvin then insists that he accompany Max and Lloyd on an ice-fishing trip. Alvin brings along a special "fission rod", which ultimately expels a laser that melts the doorknob to the ice hut, trapping the three of them inside. Abby and Diane stay home and watch a horror film. Howie visits the house and accidentally sees a scene of the film that frightens her. Abby and Diane do all they can to comfort Howie, who uses this to her advantage to get what she wants.
11	11	"The Switch Shifty Birthday Party"	Don McCutcheon	Mike Kiss	November 3, 2014	105	1.29
Max discovers a secret box hidden under Alvin's bed. When Alvin refuses to disclose what is inside the box, Max and Howie break it open and discover a bottle of green shampoo. Alvin then tells them that he invented the shampoo when he was six years old, believing that it had the capability to keep hair clean forever. He also informs them that six years earlier, Abby's ninth birthday party was ruined when she used the shampoo, which turned her hair green and scared her friends away. Following the incident, Abby chose to have no further birthday parties. Abby discovers that Alvin not only kept the shampoo, but invented it. To cheer Abby up, Max and Alvin celebrate the seven birthday parties that she would have had.
12	12	"The Nose Butter Brain Freeze"	Adam Weissman	George Doty IV	November 4, 2014	108	1.23
The Yogurt Yeti holds an employee contest to choose a new frozen yogurt flavor. Max becomes an employee there to help increase Alvin's chances of winning the contest. Alvin is upset when Max takes his title as the employee of the month. Max and Alvin then compete to see who can create the winning frozen yogurt flavor. Alvin is fired after his special Deep Freeze Deluxe flavor gives the customers severe brain freezes. When Max discovers how much Alvin enjoyed his job, he performs poorly at work to get himself fired, allowing Alvin to reclaim his job.
13	13	"The Academic Bowl Chong Problem"	Don McCutcheon	Mike Kiss	November 5, 2014	113	1.56
Alvin teams up with his two friends and his nemesis Wendy to train for the Academic Bowl. Max believes Wendy has an evil plan to sabotage Alvin's team, so he asks Howie to help. Later, Max, Alvin, and Howie find out that Wendy has a crush on Max. Then she loses interest because Max rejects her and she soon leaves the team, making Max the team's new member. Wendy creates her own team and the two teams compete with each other to determine who will go to the Academic Bowl.
14	14	"The Switch Jolly Mambo Varial"	Don McCutcheon	Ethan Banville	November 17, 2014	114	1.54
Diane tells Alvin and Abby that they probably do not realize how difficult each others' lives are, so they switch lifestyles for a day. Max assists Alvin to help him win the bet while Howie assists Abby. Alvin offers advice to Abby's friends and begins to believe that Abby's life is very easy, while Abby faces difficulty inventing things, a skill possessed by Alvin. After inventing a failed blender-powered scooter, Abby builds a food dehydrator that can preserve food forever. Alvin, who lacks fashion knowledge, invents a machine that can determine the best clothing choices for a person. Alvin and Abby unveil their inventions to their friends, but both machines fail. Alvin and Abby learn that each others' lives are not so easy after all.
15	15	"The Yeti Misty Flip Makeover"	Keith Samples	Jennifer Daley	November 18, 2014	115	1.23
Kaylee's relationship with her boyfriend Robert has recently ended, and she is too upset to properly operate the Yogurt Yeti. Alvin hires a reality television series to renovate the Yogurt Yeti to bring in new customers. Kaylee is disappointed with the renovation, which consists of new curtains and expensive frozen yogurt toppings. Meanwhile, Max allows Howie to take over his fan website so it can be updated more often. Howie then organizes Max-a-Thon, a week-long event for Max's fans to spend time with him. Max initially complains to Howie about the event, but later enjoys spending time with his fans. Alvin eventually brings Kaylee and Robert back together, and the Yogurt Yeti resumes operations.
16	16	"The Air-to-Fakie Autobiography"	Keith Samples	Mike Kiss	November 19, 2014	116	1.05
Max has difficulty writing his autobiography and eventually hires Abby to ghostwrite it for him. Abby writes various absurd stories to fill in the book, which Max does not bother to read through. Max appears on a talk show to discuss the book and his life. Backstage, Abby provides hints to Max on how to answer each question. Abby eventually comes onto the show to admit that the book is entirely fictional and that she wrote it for him. Following the advice of her horoscope, Howie declines to help Alvin prepare for an upcoming solar storm. When Howie discovers that Alvin does not believe in horoscopes, she permanently quits as his assistant. Diane later convinces Howie that different people have different beliefs, and Howie begins working with Alvin again.
17	17	"The Blindside Scoutmaster Disaster"	Steve Wright	Mike Kiss	January 5, 2015	121	1.10
Max and Alvin become the leaders of a group of scouts called Junior Porcupines and plan to take them on a camping trip. Max disagrees with Alvin's idea of bringing technology on the trip, so the scouts are split into two teams, one led by Max and the other led by Alvin. Both teams are upset with their leader after problematic camping experiences, but they later have a fun time indoors. Meanwhile, Abby gets a job as the Yogurt Yeti's mascot and must greet customers while dressed in a yeti costume. Absent: Siobhan Murphy as Diane Ackerman, Jean-Michel Le Gal as Lloyd Ackerman
18	18	"The Joey Huckfest Prankpipe"	Don McCutcheon	Ethan Banville	January 6, 2015	117	1.14
19	19	"The Buttery Bad Luck Streak"	Don McCutcheon	Jennifer Daley	January 7, 2015	118	1.08
Max and the Ackerman family prepare for a trip to Switzerland so Max can participate in a snowboarding event. After Abby's cellphone explodes and Max's foot is nearly crushed by a bowling ball, they become convinced that they are suffering bad luck. At Lloyd's request, Howie installs an advanced security system on the Ackerman home to protect it during the trip. Lloyd and Diane discover that their passport photos have been replaced with pictures of dogs; they leave the house to have the passports corrected. Max's nemesis Yuud Nuuderuud appears at the house and reveals that he was responsible for attempting to sabotage the family's trip to seek revenge against Max, Alvin, and Abby. Yuud takes control of the home's security system and locks the children inside, refusing to release them until they agree to praise him in a live online video. While the camera is still filming, Howie manages to record Yuud as he admits that he is not as great as the children had said. Yuud releases the children before he becomes aware of his mistake.
20	20	"The Backside Family Eggflip"	Steve Wright	Jennifer Daley	January 12, 2015	120	1.23
Max is depressed about his upcoming birthday, as it will be the first one he has celebrated away from his mother. At the birthday party, Alvin unveils his present, Max's mother Laura; however, Laura overhears the dangerous situations that Max has gotten into since moving in with the Ackermans and believes that their house is not safe enough for him. Laura decides that she will bring Max back home to live with her, against his desire to stay. Later that night, the Ackermans attempt to behave in a sophisticated manner in order to impress Laura and convince her that they are a normal and safe family. Although Laura knows the family is acting, she realizes that they would not go through the trouble unless they genuinely cared about Max, so she decides to let Max stay with the Ackermans.
21	21	"Boardercross Bionic Boost"	David Winning	Jennifer Daley	January 13, 2015	122	0.97
Alvin becomes Howie's assistant to help her prepare for a youth science fair, but she becomes overly demanding toward him. Howie creates a bionic hand, but Alvin does not believe it will work properly as she did not take the time to test it. At the science fair, Alvin volunteers to demonstrate the bionic hand so Howie will not feel embarrassed if it does not work. Alvin is surprised to learn how well the bionic hand works, but he injures himself when he demonstrates its strength against a brick wall. Meanwhile, Max receives a ping pong table through one of his sponsorship deals. Lloyd and Diane, who had previously suffered from an addiction to ping pong, become too obsessed with the new table to do anything else. Max and Abby, hoping to restore normalcy to their home, challenge Lloyd and Diane to a ping pong competition. Max and Abby win, and the ping pong table is removed.
22	22	"The Goofy Tamedog Air"	David Winning	Mike Kiss	January 14, 2015	123	1.13
Boardwax, Max's dog from Vermont, appears at the Ackerman house. Alvin is allergic to dogs, but to keep Max happy, he lies by telling the family that he no longer suffers from allergies, allowing Max to keep Boardwax. Alvin hides his allergic reactions from the family, but later starts sneezing uncontrollably, scaring Boardwax away. With help from a special device, Max, Alvin, and Howie locate Boardwax at the high school. Boardwax is sent back home to Vermont. Meanwhile, Kaylee helps Abby with her improvisational acting to help prepare her for an upcoming improvisational competition being held at the Yogurt Yeti, which they win.
23	23	"The Chill Bro Lipslide"	Tony Poffandi	Ethan Banville	January 15, 2015	119	1.23
Max believes that Alvin is overworked and convinces him to take a day off from science. Alvin is initially hesitant, but soon enjoys his newfound free time. Problems arise when Alvin decides to never return to science and begins acting immature. Alvin returns to his former self after a frozen yogurt machine at the Yogurt Yeti malfunctions. Meanwhile, Abby ends her relationship with her boyfriend Joey. Lloyd and Diane, who are good friends with Joey, are more upset about the breakup than Abby is, so she allows them to continue spending time with him.
24	24	"The Switch Inward Love Flip"	Keith Samples	Ethan Banville	January 16, 2015	124	N/A
Max begins dating a girl named Melanie, who is also a snowboarder. Max becomes uncomfortable when he realizes that Melanie is just like him. Melanie becomes upset when Max asks her to change everything about herself. Instead, Max changes his own appearance and personality with help from Alvin. Meanwhile, Lloyd is certain that he saw a gryphon in the backyard and begins camping there every night in an attempt to capture the creature. Although Abby is skeptical, she joins Lloyd and they spend quality time together. The gryphon turns out to be Howie's surveillance drone, which she uses to watch over the neighborhood on behalf of the block association.
25	25	"The Slopestyle Syrup Slob"	Steve Wright	Mike Kiss	June 27, 2015	125	1.18
Ozzy Asher, Max's eccentric cousin who enjoys making maple syrup, visits the Ackerman household for a few days. Ozzy decides to extend his visit, but his lifestyle discomforts the Ackermans. Max is upset when the family has Ozzy leave the house. Max and Ozzy then team up against Lloyd in the Yogurt Yeti's maple syrup competition, judged by Kaylee. Max, Ozzy, and the family eventually forgive each other and combine their syrups to create the winning syrup. Meanwhile, Diane teaches Abby how to drive a vehicle for her upcoming driver's test, which she passes.
26	26	"The Perfect Layback Life"	Steve Wright	George Doty IV	July 11, 2015	126	0.92
Max wins the Winter Cup; as a result, Max goes on a national snowboarding tour. Howie and the Ackermans do not want Max to leave, but they pretend they will not be affected by his absence, as they understand that Max's stay was never meant to be permanent. Max becomes upset when he mistakenly believes the family does not enjoy his presence. Max tells Mr. P that he is unsure if he wants to go on the tour, but he ultimately does go. When Mr. P informs Alvin of what Max said, he and Howie plan to find out if Max is happy on his tour. Abby drives Alvin and Howie to Tuba City, Arizona, to catch up with Max on his tour. Max reveals that he is not happy, as much of the tour will consist of autograph signings and making appearances, rather than snowboarding, so he decides to stay in Blizzard Springs with the Ackerman family.

=== Season 2 (2016) ===
No. overall	No. in season	Title	Directed by	Written by	Original release date	Prod. code	U.S. viewers (millions)
27	1	"The Shifty Girlfriend 360"	Steve Wright	Mike Kiss	March 21, 2016	202	0.13
Alvin is lonely while everyone else in the family has a date. Later, Alvin claims that he has a new girlfriend named Juliet, who is an art sculptor. The family believes that Alvin may not have an actual girlfriend, as he had previously made up an imaginary sister when he was younger. The family is surprised when they discover Juliet is real. After overhearing a conversation between Junk and Juliet, Max mistakenly believes that she is only dating Alvin so intelligent children will vote for her in the school's upcoming class president election. Alvin later informs Max that it was his idea to urge intelligent children to vote for Juliet. Meanwhile, Howie has a piglet stay with the Ackermans as part of an intelligence study on the animal. When she discovers that the animal has become less intelligent during its time with the family, she attempts to take it back despite the fact that they have become attached to the piglet. Howie allows the family to keep the piglet after Lloyd convinces her that the piglet is capable of teaching the family things.
28	2	"The Ghostly Grommet Bust"	Unknown	Laura Seaton	March 22, 2016	205	0.11
29	3	"The Freeriding Family Mashup"	Steve Wright	Jennifer Daley	March 23, 2016	206	0.09
Juliet insists to Alvin that their parents meet, but he believes it would be a bad idea as he is afraid of his parents causing problems. Juliet's parents are ultimately invited to the Ackerman house, but disagreements between them and the Ackermans lead to arguments. Lloyd disagrees with Juliet's mother, an astronaut who claims that Lloyd's space camp training is not nearly the same as the actual space training an astronaut undergoes. Diane disagrees with Juliet's father, the Blizzard Springs mayor, about issues that affect the city. The parents subsequently forbid their children from seeing each other. Meanwhile, Max and Abby discover that Howie has a secret snow fort. Max and Abby promise Howie that they will keep her fort a secret, but they later invite people over for a party. The fort begins to melt because of a space heater that Max brought inside. Howie lies to Max and Abby by claiming that the fort melted. Later, Howie allows Alvin and Juliet to spend time together in the fort without getting in trouble for violating their parents' orders. Their parents manage to locate them, but ultimately decide to let them keep dating.
30	4	"The Duckfooted Dreadful Date"	Steve Wright	Mike Kiss	March 24, 2016	207	0.11
Despite Abby's advice, Alvin declines to get Juliet a present for their forty-second day anniversary, which is a Blizzard Springs tradition that he does not believe is worth celebrating. Juliet is upset when she gets Alvin a present for their anniversary and discovers that he has not done the same for her. Alvin then takes advice from Lloyd, Diane, and Mr. P, which leads to a disastrous date at a restaurant. Alvin eventually takes Abby's advice to be himself, allowing him to patch up his relationship with Juliet. Meanwhile, a young girl named Harley insists that she is Max's biggest fan, which upsets Howie. The two girls then take Max's advice and work together to improve his fan website, but Harley later tells Howie that she does not like her and only wants to be friends with Max. When Max discovers the truth about Harley, he stops being friends with her.
31	5	"The Rock and Roll Rodeo 540"	Tony Poffandi	Ben McMillan & Josh Greenbaum	March 28, 2016	208	0.12
Alvin forms a band with Junk and Peter so they can enter a band competition being held by Kaylee at the Yogurt Yeti. Alvin intends to use the opportunity to sing a song he wrote for Juliet, but Max interferes when he insists on joining the band. Alvin disagrees with Max's clothing choices for the band, as well as his elaborate ideas of how the band should perform with special effects and fireworks. Max and Alvin form their own bands, with Max's band including Junk and Wendy and Alvin's band including Howie and Peter. Before they can perform, the band members abandon their demanding band leaders, who then perform together and realize they make a good band by themselves. Meanwhile, Abby, who will be leaving home for college soon, spends several days over at a friend's house. Abby uses the opportunity to test out a robot version of herself that Howie built so her family will not miss her once she leaves. Lloyd and Diane, who are initially upset about Abby leaving for college, find themselves annoyed with the Abby robot and realize they will actually enjoy their free time once Abby leaves. Abby reveals to her parents that this was her plan all along to help them deal with her moving away.
32	6	"The McTwisted Memory Making"	Steve Wright	Jennifer Daley	March 29, 2016	201	0.13
Max is criticized by some online fans for playing with teddy bears and having tea parties with Howie, so his agent hires an image consultant to give Max a tough bad boy makeover. Max's agent also forbids him from spending time with Howie. Max ultimately decides to be himself and befriends Howie again. Meanwhile, Abby, who will be attending college soon, is upset that she and Alvin have no happy memories together and wants to fill her photo album with pictures of them doing fun activities. Alvin and Abby initially suffer mishaps during their activities, but they eventually realize that they have fun together. Absent: Siobhan Murphy as Diane Ackerman, Jean-Michel Le Gal as Lloyd Ackerman
33	7	"The Inverted Life Coach Layout"	Keith Samples	Ethan Banville	March 30, 2016	203	0.12
34	8	"The Spaghetti Air Science Fair"	Larry A. McLean	Jennifer Daley	March 31, 2016	209	0.13
Juliet helps Alvin compete against Wendy in their school's science fair. Alvin invents a glove that can predict an opponent's next move in a game of rock-paper-scissors, while Wendy invents a lightweight pair of microscope glasses; they are both surprised when Max is declared the winner for his invention, a rocket-powered snowboard. Alvin gives up science and seeks a new hobby, but has no luck. Juliet convinces the science fair judge to encourage Alvin to stay involved in science. The judge reveals that he only chose Max as the winner because he is a fan of his snowboarding. Later, Max injures his arm when he tests out his new snowboard.
35	9	"The Tail Grab Reality Run"	TBD	TBD	unaired	TBA	TBD
36	10	"The Max Air Maxcot Method"	TBD	TBD	unaired	TBA	TBD
37	11	"The Big Dance Hand Plant 360"	TBD	TBD	unaired	TBA	TBD
38	12	"The Crossbone Method College Caper"	TBD	TBD	unaired	TBA	TBD
39	13	"The Kickin Chicken Banana Stack"	TBD	TBD	unaired	TBA	TBD

== Broadcast ==
In Canada, the series aired on YTV. In the United States, the series' first season aired on Nickelodeon from October 6, 2014, to July 11, 2015, while the second season premiered on Nicktoons on March 21, and aired through March 31, 2016. In Australia, the series began airing on Nickelodeon on January 17, 2015.

== Reception ==
=== Critical response ===
Max & Shred received mixed reviews.

Emily Ashby of Common Sense Media rated the series four stars out of five, saying that it "keeps viewers' focus on the boys, whose antics are truly fun to watch and offer viewers really positive messages about relationships." She also describes the show as a "typical sitcom world in which problems are solved in a 30-minute window [and] they express their feelings and value their friendship over the trials that threaten it."

=== Ratings ===
Viewership and ratings per season of Max & Shred
Season	Network	Episodes	First aired		Last aired		Avg. viewers (millions)
Season	Network	Episodes	Date	Viewers (millions)	Date	Viewers (millions)	Avg. viewers (millions)
1	Nickelodeon	25	October 6, 2014	1.15	July 11, 2015	0.92	1.19
2	Nicktoons	8	March 21, 2016	0.13	March 31, 2016	0.13	0.12

=== Awards and nominations ===
At the 4th Canadian Screen Awards, the series was nominated for Best Children's or Youth Fiction Program or Series.
