= List of awards and nominations received by National Film and Television School =

National Film and Television School
- Established: 1971
- Affiliations: CILECT
- Location: Beaconsfield, Buckinghamshire, United Kingdom; 51.6054°N 0.6374°W
- Website: www.nfts.co.uk

The National Film and Television School (NFTS) was established in 1971 and is based at Beaconsfield Studios in Beaconsfield, Buckinghamshire, and it is located close to Pinewood Studios.

== Awards and nominations ==
The students regularly get nominated (and sometimes win) international awards, even Oscars.

Examples includes The Hill Farm (Mark Baker),Second Class Mail (Allison Snowden) and A Grand Day Out (Nick Park).

=== 2011 ===
Director	Film	Festival	Award
Toom, Tanel	The Confession	Academy Awards (USA)	Short Film (Live Action) (nominated)
Toom, Tanel	The Confession	MPSE Golden Reels Awards (USA)	Verna Fields Award for Best Sound Editing in a Student Film (nominated)

=== 2010 ===
Director	Film	Festival	Award
Bacon, Philip	Yellow Belly End	British Animation Awards (UK)	Best Student Film
Bacon, Philip	Yellow Belly End	MPSE Golden Reels Awards (USA)	Verna Fields Award for Best Sound Editing in a Student Film (nominated)
Bacon, Philip	Yellow Belly End	Royal Television Society Student Television Awards (UK)	Best Postgraduate Animation
Flor, Joana	The Next Big Thing	Royal Television Society Student Television Awards (UK)	Best Postgraduate Entertainment (nominated)
Fragkopoulos, Konstantinos	Blackwater	Learning On Screen awards (UK)	Best Student Production (shortlisted)
Garrido-Prada, Sophia	The Next Big Thing	Royal Television Society Student Television Awards (UK)	Best Postgraduate Entertainment (nominated)
Green, Tom	Brixton 85	Royal Television Society Student Television Awards (UK)	Best Postgraduate Fiction
Green, Tom	Kid	Angers Premiers Plans Film Festival (France)	Students of Angers Award for European Student Films
Green, Tom	Kid	Royal Television Society Student Television Awards (UK)	Best Postgraduate Fiction (nominated)
Lee, Hyebin	Cherry on the Cake	Royal Television Society Student Television Awards (UK)	Best Postgraduate Animation (nominated)
Marhaban, Li	The End of the Line	MPSE Golden Reels Awards (USA)	Verna Fields Award for Best Sound Editing in a Student Film (nominated)
Mather, Vicky	Stanley Pickle	Chicago International Film Festival (USA)	Silver Plaque for Best Animation
Mather, Vicky	Stanley Pickle	Edinburgh International Film Festival (UK)	McLaren Award for Best Animation
Mather, Vicky	Stanley Pickle	KROK International Animated Film Festival (Russia & Ukraine)	Best Graduation Film
Mather, Vicky	Stanley Pickle	Raindance Film Festival (UK)	Best UK Short
O'Leary, Mike	Not Safe for Work	Royal Television Society Student Television Awards (UK)	Best Postgraduate Entertainment
Olteanu, Marius	Why Don't You Dance?	Fujifilm Shorts Competition (UK)	Finalist
Piercy, Helen	Goodbye Mr. Pink	Fujifilm Shorts Competition (UK)	Finalist
Press, Guy	TV or Not TV?	Royal Television Society Student Television Awards (UK)	Best Postgraduate Entertainment (nominated)
Rodríguez, Alberto	The Incredible Story of my Great Grandmother Olive	Learning On Screen awards (UK)	Best Student Production
Rodríguez, Alberto	The Incredible Story of my Great Grandmother Olive	MPSE Golden Reels Awards (USA)	Verna Fields Award for Best Sound Editing in a Student Film (nominated)
Toom, Tanel	The Confession	Student Academy Awards (USA)	Honorary Foreign Film
Woodward, Will	No Easy Time	Sheffield International Documentary Festival (UK)	Student Doc Award

=== 2009 ===
Director	Film	Festival	Award
Blair, Sam	Sprinters	Royal Television Society Student Television Awards (UK)	Best Postgraduate Documentary award (nominated)
Clark, Ian	Outcasts	Fujifilm Shorts Competition (UK)	Best Short Film
Clark, Ian	Outcasts	Royal Television Society Student Television Awards (UK)	Best Postgraduate Drama award (nominated)
Dean, Leon	Valley of the Goats	Royal Television Society Student Television Awards (UK)	Best Postgraduate Documentary award (nominated)
de Jesus, FernandoR Gutierrez (co-director)	Commission Impossible	Royal Television Society Student Television Awards (UK)	Best Postgraduate Entertainment award (nominated)
Deshon, Simon	Bill's Visitors	WorldFest International Film Festival (USA)	Platinum Remi, Best Animation
El-Amriti, Ikram	Sounds Like a Laugh	Royal Television Society Student Television Awards (UK)	Best Postgraduate Entertainment award (nominated)
Fragkopoulos, Konstantinos	Blackwater	WorldFest International Film Festival (USA)	Platinum Remi, Best Film
Gooch, Chris	Mummy's Boy	MPSE Golden Reels Awards (USA)	Verna Fields Award for Best Sound Editing in a Student Film
Harrie, Samantha	Love Letters	Royal Television Society Student Television Awards (UK)	Best Postgraduate Drama award (nominated)
Karia, Aneil	Spilt Milk	Learning On Screen awards (UK)	Best Student Production
Karia, Aneil	Spilt Milk	Royal Television Society Student Television Awards (UK)	Best Postgraduate Entertainment award (nominated)
Lee, Hyebin	Cherry on the Cake	Shanghai International Film Festival (China)	Best Animation
Metev, Ilian	Goleshovo	Golden Rhyton Film Festival (Bulgaria)	Best Debut and Award of the Bulgarian National Television
Metev, Ilian	Golshovo	Kraków Film Festival (Poland)	Don Quichote Award
Metev, Ilian	Goleshovo	Lessinia Film Festival (Italy)	Veneto Award
Metev, Ilian	Goleshovo	Lessinia Film Festival (Italy)	Young Director Award
Metev, Ilian	Goleshovo	New Zealand Documentary Film Festival	Best Short Documentary (nominated)
Metev, Ilian	Goleshovo	Sehsüchte International Student Film Festival (Germany)	Best Documentary Film
Metev, Ilian	Goleshovo	Timishort, Timisoara Short Film Festival (Romania)	Audience Award
Metev, Ilian	Goleshovo	Timishort, Timisoara Short Film Festival (Romania)	Best Director Award
Metev, Ilian	Goleshovo	Valdivia Film Festival (Chile)	Best Short Film
Pearce, Michael	Madrugada	Royal Television Society Student Television Awards (UK)	Best Postgraduate Drama award (nominated)
Pearce, Sally	Elephants	BAFTA Cymru (Wales, UK)	Best Short Film (nominated)
Pearce, Sally	Elephants	MPSE Golden Reels Awards (USA)	Verna Fields Award for Best Sound Editing in a Student Film (nominated)
Pearce, Sally	Elephants	Shanghai International Film Festival (China)	Best Creative Idea
Pearce, Sally	Elephants	Ffresh – Student Moving Image Festival of Wales (Wales, UK)	Out of Sight award
Pierce, Joseph	Stand Up	Learning On Screen awards (UK)	Best Student Production (nominated)
Pierce, Joseph	Stand Up	Royal Television Society Student Television Awards (UK)	Best Postgraduate Animation award (nominated)
Ritchie, Luke Oliver (co-director)	Commission Impossible	Royal Television Society Student Television Awards (UK)	Best Postgraduate Entertainment award (nominated)
Rodríguez, Alberto	The Incredible Story of my Great Grandmother Olive	Palm Springs International Short Film Festival (USA)	Best Student Animation Award (2nd place)
Wagner, Estephan	Waiting for Women	Festival La Fila (Spain)	Best Documentary
Wagner, Estephan	Waiting for Women	International Documentary Film Festival (Uruguay)	Special Jury Mention
Wagner, Estephan	Waiting for Women	Palm Springs International Short Film Festival (USA)	Best Student Documentary Award

=== 2008 ===
Director	Film	Festival	Award
Aguirre, Silvana	Ela	Academy Awards (USA)	Best Short Film (Live Action) (shortlisted)
Aguirre, Silvana	Ela	Royal Television Society Student Television Awards (UK)	Best Drama (nominated)
Banozcki, Tibor	Milk Teeth	Cartoon Forum (Europe)	Cartoon d'or (nominated)
Banozcki, Tibor	Milk Teeth	Seoul International Cartoon and Animation Festival (South Korea)	Special Distinction (Graduation Film)
Banozcki, Tibor	Milk Teeth	Stuttgart International Animation Festival (Germany)	Special Mention (Best Graduation Film)
Forés, Marçal	Friends Forever	Premier Plans Festival d'Angers (France)	Prix MikroCine/Canal+ Cinema Award
Forés, Marçal	Friends Forever	Royal Television Society Student Television Awards (UK)	Best Drama Award
Metev, Ilian	Goleshovo	International Leipzig Festival for Documentary and Animated Film (Germany)	Talent Dove
Metev, Ilian	Goleshovo	Molodist, Kyiv International Film Festival (Ukraine)	Best Student Film
Pierce, Joseph	Stand Up	Edinburgh International Film Festival (UK)	McLaren Award for Animation (2nd Prize)
Pierce, Joseph	Stand Up	Rushes Soho Shorts Festival (UK)	Best Animation (nominated)
Tucker, Joe	For the Love of God	MPSE Golden Reels Awards (USA)	Verna Fields Award for Student Sound Editing (nominated)
Tucker, Joe	For the Love of God	Royal Television Society Student Television Awards (UK)	Best Animation (nominated)
Tucker, Joe	For the Love of God	Santa Barbara International Film Festival (USA)	Bruce Corwin Award for Best Animation
Varela, Peque	1977	Arcipelago Film Festival (Italy)	Best Digital Shortfilm
Varela, Peque	1977	Festival de Cans (Spain)	Best Animation
Varela, Peque	1977	Festival de Curtmetratges de Manlleu (Spain)	Best Animation
Varela, Peque	1977	Montecatini Shortfilm Festival (Italy)	Best Debut Film
Varela, Peque	1977	Stuttgart International Animation Festival (Germany)	Best Student Film

=== 2007 ===
Director	Film	Festival	Award
Aguirre, Silvana	Ela	Cine Gear Expo (Los Angeles, USA)	2nd Prize
Ahmed, Sadik	Tanju Miah	Royal Television Society Student Television Awards (UK)	Best Factual Film
Banozcki, Tibor	Milk Teeth	Annecy International Animation Festival (France)	Jury's Special Award
Banozcki, Tibor	Milk Teeth	Karlovy Vary Fresh Films Festival (Czech Republic)	Theatre Optique Award for Best Animated Film
Banozcki, Tibor	Milk Teeth	Puchon International Student Animation Festival (South Korea)	Vision Prize
Colman, Sharon	Badgered	Telluride Mountainfilm Festival (USA)	Best Animated Film
Forés, Marçal	Friends Forever	Dinard Festival of British Cinema (France)	Best Short Film
Gitton, Esteban	Oxford Circus	Animex International Festival of Animation and Computer Games (UK)	Visual Effects Award
Lemmetty, Leevi	Mad World	Royal Television Society Student Television Awards (UK)	Best Animation
Peres, Catia	Synchronoff	MPSE Golden Reels Awards (USA)	Verna Fields Award for Best Sound Editing in a Student Film (nominated)
Ruiz, Valeria	A Moment	Brooklyn International Film Festival (USA)	Audience Award for Best Short Film
Sanderson, Piers	Listen to Bradford	Satyajit Ray Foundation (UK)	Short Film Award (nominated)
Tang, Eva	Londres-London	Hawaii International Film Festival (USA)	Best 10 Short Film Finalist
Tang, Eva	Londres-London	Hong Kong Independent Short Film & Video Awards	Jury Recommendation
Tucker, Joe	For the Love of God	Chicago International Film Festival (USA)	Silver Hugo
Tucker, Joe	For the Love of God	Rhode Island International Film Festival (USA)	Best Animation
Tucker, Joe	For the Love of God	Rhode Island International Film Festival (USA)	Grand Prize
Varela, Peque	1977	London International Animation Festival (UK)	Audience Award
