= University of Information Technology and Sciences =

Private university in Bangladesh

- ইউনিভার্সিটি অব ইনফরমেশন টেকনোলজি অ্যান্ড সায়েন্সেস
- Seal of University of Information Technology and Sciences. The current logo of the University of Information Technology and Sciences is being used from November, 2019.
- Motto: Future will be better than the past
- Type: Private research university
- Established: 2003; 23 years ago
- Founders: Sufi Mohammed Mizanur Rahman
- Affiliations: UGC
- Chancellor: President Mohammed Shahabuddin
- Vice-Chancellor: Abu Hashan Bhuiyan
- Academic staff: 120 (approximately)
- Administrative staff: 70 (approximately)
- Students: 5000 (approximately)
- Location: Holding 190, Road 5, Block J, Baridhara, Maddha Naya Nagar, Vatara, Dhaka 1212, Dhaka, 1212, Bangladesh; 23.7945°N 90.4243°E
- Campus: Urban
- Language: English
- Website: uits.edu.bd

The University of Information Technology & Sciences (Bengali: ইউনিভার্সিটি অব ইনফরমেশন টেকনোলজি অ্যান্ড সায়েন্সেস) commonly known as UITS is a private university in Baridhara, Dhaka, Bangladesh.

== History ==
The UITS was founded on August 7, 2003, as a non-profit organization. Information Science and Technology Solution Ltd., a concern of PHP Family headed by Alhaj Sufi Mohamed Mizanur Rahman Chowdhury is the sponsor of UITS.

== Administration ==
The vice chancellor of the university is the chief executive. Each academic department has its own head. On top of the administration, there is the Board of Trustees (BoT), headed by a chairperson, which oversees policy matters. In the academic sphere, the highest authority is vested in the Academic Council represented by heads of schools and teaching departments, representatives of teachers and nominated members who are associated with education, science, culture, industries, media and scientific and cultural organizations in the country. The council is presided over by the vice chancellor. The registrar of the university acts as the secretary who is also the custodian of the university seal.

== List of vice-chancellors ==
- A. Majeed Khan (August 2003-June 2006)
- Mohammed A. Aziz (July 2006-August 2011)
- Mr. Mohammed Iqbal Hossain (Acting) (1st September 2011-30th September 2011)
- K M Saiful Islam Khan (Acting) (1st October-2011 June 2012)
- Muhammad Samad (July 2012-3 May 2016)
- Mohammad Solaiman (Acting) (4 May 2016-21 May 2017)
- Mohammad Solaiman (22 May 2017-18 April 2022)
- Abu Hashan Bhuiyan (Acting) (19 April 2022-13 January 2024)
- Abu Hashan Bhuiyan (14 January 2024-present)

== Academic programs ==
=== Faculty of Science & Engineering (FSE) ===
- B.Sc. in Civil Engineering (CE)
- B.Sc. in Computer Science & Engineering (CSE)
- B.Sc. in Information Technology (IT)
- B.Sc. in Electronics & Communication Engineering (ECE)
- B.Sc. in Electrical & Electronics Engineering (EEE)
- Bachelor of Pharmacy (B.Pharm.)
- M.Sc. in Computer Science and Engineering
- M.Sc. in Telecommunication Engineering

=== Faculty of Business (FoB) ===
- Bachelor of Business Administration (BBA Graduate)
- Master of Business Administration (Executive MBA)
- Master of Business Administration (Regular MBA)

=== Faculty of Liberal Arts & Social Sciences (FLASS) ===
- Bachelor of Arts in English
- Bachelor of Social Sciences in Social Work
- Master of Arts in English (English Graduate)
- Master of Arts in English (Others)
- Master of Social Sciences in Social Work

=== Faculty of LAW ===
- Bachelor of Law (Honors)
- Master of Laws (LLM)

== Permanent campus ==
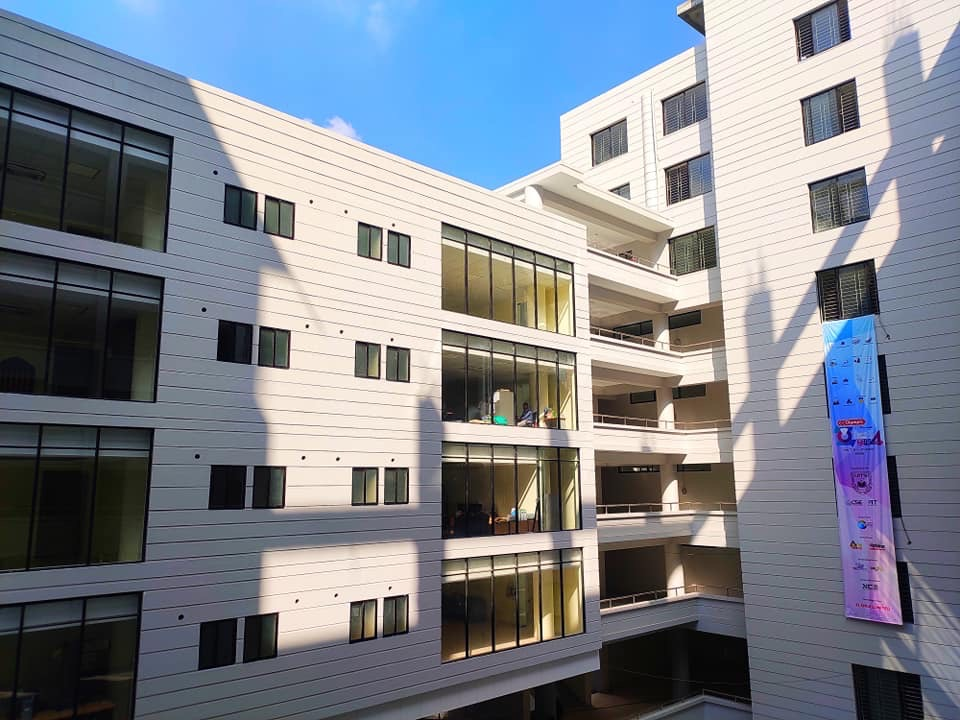

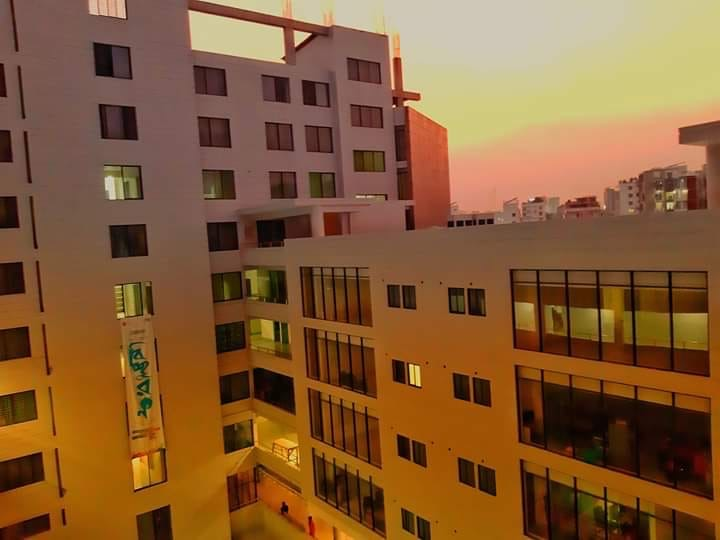

The university has shifted to a fully equipped permanent campus on November 11, 2019, situated at Nayanagar, Vatara, Dhaka. The campus started its journey right after the freshers ceremony of Autumn Semester, 2019.

== Timeline of UITS ==
- On August 7, 2003, the university began with 3 schools.
- On March 10, 2004, the Bachelor of Business Administration, the first undergraduate program of UITS, was started under Business Studies Department.
- On August 22, 2004, the Bachelor of Arts in English and Master of Computer Applications was started under Department of English and Computer Science & Engineering.
- On October 18, 2004, the International Master of Business Administration was started under Business Studies Department
- On September 13, 2005, the programme Bachelor of Science in Computer Science & Engineering was started under Department of Computer Science & Engineering.
- On October 9, 2005, the programme Bachelor of Science in Electronics & Communication Engineering and the Master of Science in Telecommunications were started under the Department of Electronics & Communication Engineering.
- On November 20, 2005, the programme Bachelor of Laws was started under the Department of Law.
- On March 22, 2006, the programme Master of Laws was started under the Department of Law. Master of Arts in English was started under the Department of English, and Bachelor of Science in Information Technology was started under Department of Information Technology.
- On May 3, 2006, the programme Master of Science in Telecommunication was started under the Department of Electronic & Communication Engineering.
- On July 27, 2008, the programme Bachelor of Laws (2 years) was started under the Department of Law.
- On December 21, 2008, the programme Bachelor of Science in Electrical & Electronic Engineering was started under the Department of Electrical & Electronic Engineering.
- On May 7, 2012, the programme Bachelor of Science in Civil Engineering was started under the Department of Civil Engineering.
- On October 22, 2013, the programme Bachelor of Social Sciences in Social Work and Master of Social Sciences in Social Work was started under the Department of Social Work.
- On December 3, 2013, the programme Bachelor of Pharmacy was started under the Department of Pharmacy.
- In October 2018 the programme Bachelor of Pharmacy was accredited by the Pharmacy Council of Bangladesh (PCB).
