= Sadik Ahmed =

British film director and cinematographer (born 1977)

- সাদিক আহমেদ
- Born: 29 March 1977 (age 49); Bangladesh
- Citizenship: British
- Education: London College of Printing; Central Saint Martins College of Art and Design; National Film and Television School (M.A.)
- Occupations: Film director, cinematographer, screenwriter, film producer
- Years active: 2007–present

Sadik Ahmed (Bengali: সাদিক আহমেদ; born 29 March 1977) is a Bangladeshi-born British film director and cinematographer.

== Early life ==
Ahmed was born in Bangladesh, came to England as a child and was brought up in Stamford Hill, London.

Ahmed studied Painting and Photography at London College of Printing Central St Martins School of Art, before going to the National Film and Television School to study MA in Cinematography and graduated in 2006.

== Career ==
As his graduation film Ahmed made Tanju Miah, a National Lottery-funded short which won Best Factual Film at the Royal Television Society Student Television Awards 2007, Best Cinematography at the Kodak Student Commercial Awards 2006. as well as being runner-up in the best newcomer category at the Grierson Awards 2006, TCM classic shorts, Satyajit Ray award, amongst others. The film appeared at the Sundance Film Festival and Toronto International Film Festival.

In 2007, Ahmed later directed a western called The Last Thakur. It was a Channel 4 co-production with Artificial Eye as the distributor. The film was received well by critics and Sight & Sound magazine named The Last Thakur "one of the most confident British debut features since Asif Kapadia's The Warrior (2001)… with which it shares an Asian location and language and a welcome belief in the primacy of visual storytelling."

The film premiered at the London Film Festival and was shown at the Dubai International Film Festival, Mumbai International Film Festival, New York Film Festival, and others and finally had its theatrical release in the United Kingdom on 29 June 2009.

In January 2010, Ahmed was nominated for a Cinematography Fellowship Award by Arts Council England. He has since then signed into his second feature film, The King of Mirpur, which is an urban cop thriller set in the modern subcontinent.

== Filmography ==
Year	Title	Notes	Credit
2006	Oxford Circus	Short	Cinematographer
2006	Londres. London	Short	Cinematographer
2007	Tanju Miah	Short	Cinematographer, director, producer
2007	Build a Ship, Sail to Sadness	Feature film	Cinematographer
2007	Aisha and Nadeem		Cinematographer
2007	Night Junkies	Feature film	Cinematographer
2008	The Last Thakur	Feature film	Cinematographer, director, writer
2018	Hasina: A Daughter's Tale	Docudrama	Cinematographer

== See also ==
- British Bangladeshi
- List of British Bangladeshis
