= Mohammad Solaiman =

Bangladeshi academic (1955–2026)

- মোহম্মদ সোলায়মান

Vice-Chancellor of University of Science and Technology Chittagong
- In office 22 May 2017 – 15 October 2026

Vice-Chancellor of University of Information Technology and Sciences
- In office 4 May 2016 – 18 April 2022

Personal details
- Born: 26 October 1955 Masjidda, Chittagong District, East Bengal, Pakistan
- Died: 15 October 2026 (aged 70) Chittagong District, Bangladesh
- Education: Sitakund Degree College (1974); University of Chittagong (1979); University of Pune (1990); University of Rhode Island (1999)
- Profession: Professor, University academic

Mohammad Solaiman (Bengali: মোহম্মদ সোলায়মান; 26 October 1955 – 15 October 2026) was a Bangladeshi academic. He was the vice chancellor of the University of Science and Technology Chittagong (USTC) till his death. He was also the vice chancellor of the University of Information Technology and Sciences (UITS) in Dhaka and a professor of marketing at Chittagong University.

== Life and career ==
Solaiman was born in Masjidda, Chittagong District, East Bengal on 26 October 1955, to a Muslim family in the village of Masjidda in Sitakunda, Chittagong District, East Bengal. He studied at Masajidda High School and completed his Higher Secondary Certificate from Sitakund Degree College in 1974. He graduated from the University of Chittagong in 1979. He completed his PhD from the University of Pune in India in 1990. Solaiman received his post-doctoral degree from University of Rhode Island in 1999.

Solaiman died from complications of diabetes and heart disease on 15 October 2026, at the age of 70.

== Awards ==
Solaiman received various awards and honours including Fulbright Fellowship and Commonwealth Scholarship and Fellowship Plan.
