= Amir Hamja =

New York based photojournalist

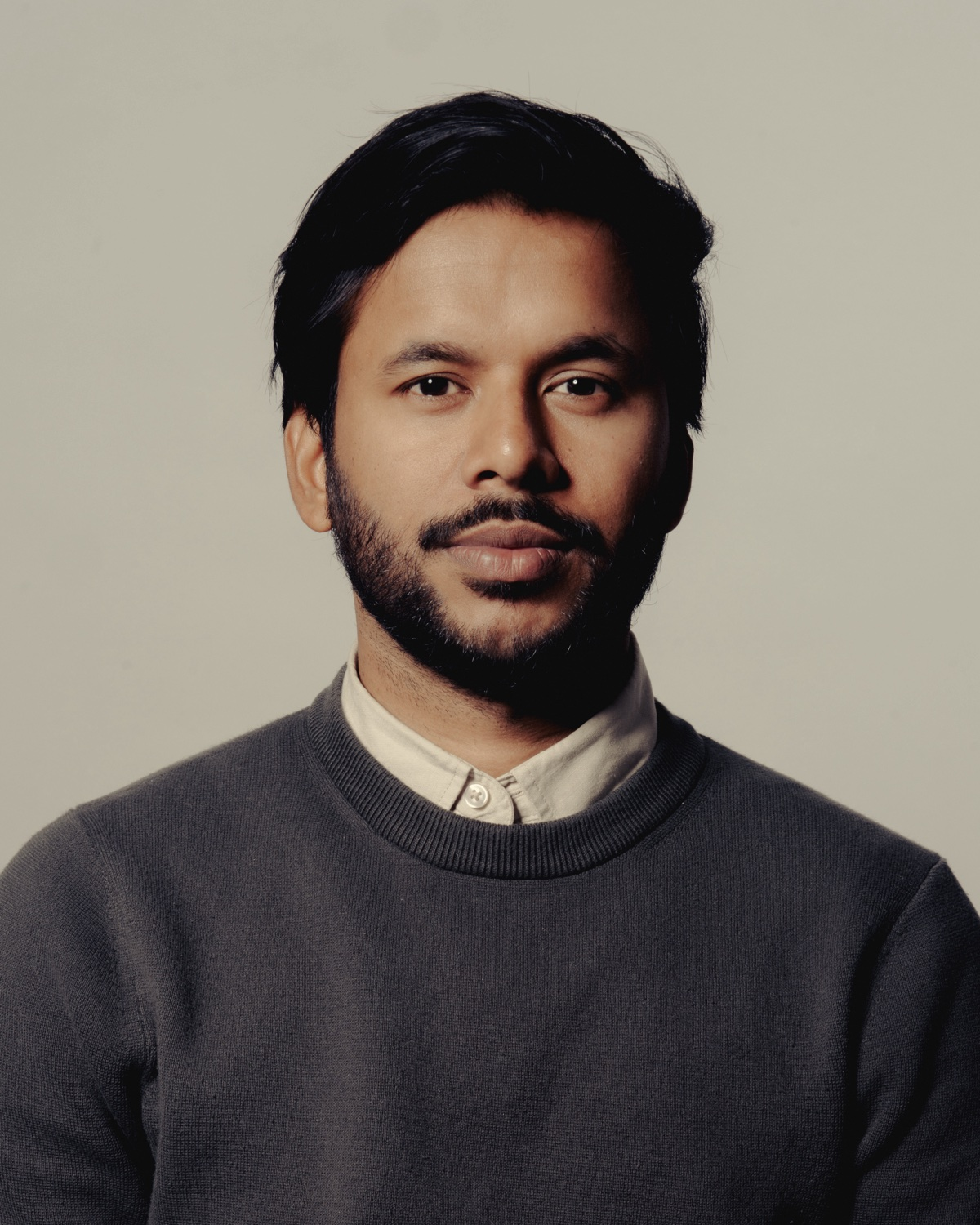
- Hamja in 2026
- Born: Mohammad Amir Hamza; 1992 (age 33–34); Chattogram, Bangladesh
- Education: University of Science and Technology Chittagong (USTC)
- Years active: 2014–present
- Known for: Photography
- Awards: Sony World Photography Award (2017)
- Website: https://www.amirhamja.com

Mohammad Amir Hamza, professionally known as Amir Hamja, is a Bangladeshi photojournalist based in New York. A former staff photographer and member of the Times Fellowship class of 2023–24, Hamja frequently contributes to The New York Times.

His works have appeared in Bloomberg, National Geographic, The Wall Street Journal, The Guardian, and The Washington Post, among others. He served as the official photographer of the Emmy-winning Netflix show Patriot Act with Hasan Minhaj.

Hamja's photographs have appeared in the front page of The New York Times multiple times, as well as of The Wall Street Journal. Hamja's photograph was featured in TIME magazine's ‘Top 100 Photos of the Year’ in 2025. Subsequently, the Ministry of Cultural Affairs announced that the Bangladesh Shilpakala Academy will introduce Photography as a dedicated department for the first time.

== Early life and education ==
Amir Hamja was born in 1992 in Chattogram, Bangladesh. He pursued a degree in pharmacy at the University of Science and Technology Chattogram (USTC), graduating in 2014. During his studies, Hamja developed an interest in photography, beginning amateur photography in 2012.

== Career ==
Amir Hamja is an Arabic name. Amir means "prince," "commander" or "ruler." And Hamja (Hamza) means "strong" and "steadfast" and refers to the Islamic Prophet Muhammad's Uncle "Hamza," who was a skilled fighter and commander. I prefer using "J" instead of "Z" in Hamja, as it's more suitable with my native language, Bengali "হামজা." To avoid confusion, I don't use Mohammad as a first name in my byline (or any other online presence), as it is a very common first name among Muslims.

— Amir Hamja, on Asian photographers share the stories behind their names, by NPR

In 2016, Hamja's photographs from the Shakrain Festival in Old Dhaka caught the attention of Bangladeshi filmmaker Piplu Khan. This led to Hamja's first professional photography job, working on a documentary about BRAC founder Fazle Hasan Abed. During that time, he also worked on the biographical film about the Prime Minister of Bangladesh, Hasina: A Daughter's Tale. He subsequently earned a scholarship from the International Center of Photography in New York, from where he graduated in 2018.

Hamja has worked on the Netflix series Patriot Act with Hasan Minhaj as the official photographer of the show.

=== The New York Times ===
Hamja's photography during the 2020 George Floyd protests in New York City drew the interest of media outlets, leading to his first assignments with The New York Times. His work mostly covers style, fashion, and movies segment.

In 2022, Hamja worked on a series of stories for The New York Times titled "A Risky Wager," which explores "how online sports betting has taken America by storm." This series has been published in a five-part format, with Hamja's photography accompanying the investigative reports from renowned journalists such as Eric Lipton and Kenneth Vogel.

In 2024, Hamja covered the 96th Academy Awards for The New York Times. He left the Times as a staff fellow photojournalist in May 2024.

In 2025, Amir Hamja photographed Bollywood superstar Shah Rukh Khan at Met Gala for The New York Times. Hamja's images, capturing Khan’s debut appearance at the Met Gala in a Sabyasachi black suit, aligning with the event’s theme Superfine: Tailoring Black Style—garnered widespread attention through social and mainstream media.

==== The Year in Pictures ====
In 2021, one photograph by Hamja was featured in "The Year in Pictures 2021" by The New York Times. In 2023, Hamja's three photographs were featured in the selection.

=== Others ===
Before being employed by The New York Times Hamja worked as a photojournalist for media outlets including Vogue, Bloomberg News, The Wall Street Journal, and The Guardian, working with Brendan Fraser, Novak Djokovic, Mira Nair, Loudon Wainwright III, Quentin Tarantino, among others.

==== TIME ====
In November 2025, Hamja’s image of the burial prayers for Didarul Islam was named one of TIME’s "100 Photos of the Year." In recognition of this global achievement and the success of past honorees like KM Asad and Taslima Akhter, Cultural Affairs Adviser Mostofa Sarwar Farooki announced the establishment of the first-ever photography department at the Bangladesh Shilpakala Academy to provide institutional support for the medium.

=== Exhibition ===
Amir Hamja's first solo exhibition, titled A Year in the Times, was held at the EMK Center in Dhaka, Bangladesh, from December 19, 2024, to January 4, 2025. The exhibition showcased 24 photographs from his year-long fellowship with The New York Times, showcasing moments such as the Met Gala, the George Floyd protests, and a poignant feature on a Palestinian family in Springfield, New Jersey.

== Awards ==
Year	Award	Organization	Ref.
2015	Third place, Bangladesh National Award, Sony World Photography Awards	World Photography Organisation	
2016	First prize, EyeEm 'People and Places' Photography Competition	EyeEm	
2017	Winner, Bangladesh National Award, Sony World Photography Award	World Photography Organisation	
2018	Second Place, 'The World We Live In'	Pied à Terre, France	
2023	Young Guns 21 Winner	The One Club	
