= Debojyoti Mishra =

Indian composer

Debojyoti Mishra দেবজ্যোতি মিশ্র
- Born: Kolkata, India
- Genres: Film score, Music, Bengali Music, Indian Music, World Music
- Occupation: music director composer
- Years active: 1998–present
- Spouse: Jonaki Mukherjee
- Website: www.debojyotimishra.co.in

Debojyoti Mishra (born 30 April 1963 at Kolkata) is an Indian music director and film composer. He became popular with his minimalist classical compositions for the Hindi film Raincoat, directed by Rituparno Ghosh. He also worked on Bengali films, Chaturanga and Sesher Kobita, directed by Suman Mukhopadhyay. He composed songs for the Bengali film Autograph starring Prasenjit Chatterjee, Nandana Sen and Indraneil Sengupta.

== Early years and career ==
He had composed for Shakira in a British production being directed by Enamul Karim.

== Filmography ==
Year	Film	Director	Notes	Ref
1997	Dahan	Rituparno Ghosh		
1998	Hazaar Chaurasi Ki Maa	Govind Nihalani		
1999	Asukh	Rituparno Ghosh		
1999	Tumi Ele Tai	Prabhat Roy		
2000	Bariwali	Rituparno Ghosh		
2000	Utsab	Rituparno Ghosh		
2001	Ek Je Aachhe Kanya	Subrata Sen		
2001	Patalghar	Abhijit Chowdhury		
2002	Titli	Rituparno Ghosh		
2002	Hemanter Pakhi	Urmi Chakraborty		
2002	Aamar Bhuvan	Mrinal Sen		
2002	Swapner Feriwala	Subrata Sen		
2002	Shubho Mahurat	Rituparno Ghosh		
2003	Choker Bali	Rituparno Ghosh		
2004	Shadows of Time	Florian Gallenberger		
2004	Raincoat	Rituparno Ghosh		
2007	Aha!	Enamul Karim Nirjhar		
2007	Dharm	Bhavna Talwar		
2008	Calcutta News	Blessy		
2008	Chaturanga	Suman Mukhopadhyay		
2008	Ramchand Pakistani	Mehreen Jabbar		
2010	Arekti Premer Golpo	Kaushik Ganguly		
2010	Natobor Notout	Amit Sen		
2010	Autograph	Srijit Mukherji		
2011	Iti Mrinalini	Aparna Sen		
2011	Uro Chithi	Kamaleshwar Mukherjee		
2011	Memories in March	Sanjoy Nag		
2012	Chitrangada : The Crowning Wish	Rituparno Ghosh		
2012	Tabe Tai Hok	Sougata Roy Burman		
2013	Meghe Dhaka Tara	Kamaleshwar Mukherjee		
2013	Chhayamoy	Haranath Chakraborty		
2013	Basanto Utsav	Rhitobrata Bhattacharya		
2013	Goynar Baksho	Aparna Sen		
2013	Chander Pahar	Kamaleshwar Mukherjee		
2013	Satyanweshi	Rituparno Ghosh		
2013	Mishawr Rawhoshyo	Srijit Mukherji		
2014	Baari Tar Bangla	Rangan Chakraborty		
2015	Shesher Kobita	Suman Mukhopadhyay		
2015	Natoker Moto	Debesh Chattopadhyay		
2015	Arshinagar	Aparna Sen		
2016	Kiriti O Kalo Bhromor	Anindya Bikas Datta		
2017	Meghnad Badh Rahasya	Anik Dutta		
2017	Raktokorobi	Amitabh Bhattacharjee		
2017	Curzoner Kalom	Souvik Mitra		
2017	Mayurakshi	Atanu Ghosh		
2018	Mukhomukhi	Kamaleshwar Mukherjee		
2018	Hasina: A Daughter's Tale	Piplu Khan	Bangladeshi docudrama; based on Sheikh Hasina's family story	
2018	Maati	Leena Gangopadhyay & Saibal Banerjee		
2018	Hason Raja	Ruhul Amin		
2019	Mahalaya	Soumik Sen		
2020	Bansuri: The Flute	Hari Viswanath		
2020	Gondi	Fakhrul Arefeen Khan		
2021	Binisutoy	Atanu Ghosh		
2022	Aparajito	Anik Dutta		
2022	Aay Khuku Aay	Sauvik Kundu		
2022	Nishiddho	Tara Ramanujan	Malayalam film	
2023	Aaro Ek Prithibi	Atanu Ghosh		
2023	Shesh Pata	Atanu Ghosh		
2025	Joto Kando Kolkatatei	Anik Dutta		
2025	Jaya Aar Sharmin	Piplu Khan	Bangladeshi film	
2025	Rabindra Kabya Rahasya	Sayantan Ghosal		
