= The Last Thakur =

2008 film

- UK theatrical release poster
- Directed by: Sadik Ahmed
- Written by: Sadik Ahmed; Heather Taylor
- Produced by: Atif Ghani; Tamsin Lyons
- Starring: Ahmed Rubel; Tariq Anam Khan; Tanveer Hassan
- Cinematography: Sadik Ahmed
- Edited by: Hugh Williams
- Music by: Kishon Khan; Birger Clausen
- Distributed by: Artificial Eye
- Release dates: 25 October 2008 (London Film Festival); 26 January 2009 (United Kingdom)
- Running time: 81 minutes
- Country: United Kingdom
- Language: Bengali

The Last Thakur is a 2008 Bengali-language British Western film directed by Sadik Ahmed, who co-wrote the screenplay with Heather Taylor, and starring Ahmed Rubel, Tariq Anam Khan and Tanveer Hassan. The film is about a lone gunman who enters a town to take revenge on the person who raped his mother during the Bangladesh Liberation War. In the course of revenge he is used by the internal clash of two rival leaders of the town.

== Plot ==
Set in the aftermath of an election in rural Bangladesh in a small, remote town of Doulathpur, a riverside shanty town in the marshlands of interior, rural Bangladesh, which is dominated by two men with a lingering feud who contend for power.

One is the long-established Thakur, the only Hindu in the area, and an aging, old-fashioned, crippled, manic, eccentric landlord (Tariq Anam), whose influence is waning, owns most of the property in a largely Muslim village and has ruthlessly repossessed debt-ridden land to build his lasting monument a Hindu temple commemorating his family – and has isolated himself from the local, largely Muslim community in the process as most them view this as idolatrous. Thakur is the last in his line, and his days are numbered. This, in turn provokes a suspicious and intense rivalry with his rival, a populist, seductive, corrupt, ruthless Muslim politician and village boss known as the Chairman (Ahmed Rubel). Chairman likes everyone to call him 'father' – except the actual sons that his philandering has left scattered about town. After a possibly rigged local election, he appears to run everything, and purports to represent and defend his people. Chairman is determined to use the opportunity presented by Thakur's decline to move in on his territory himself and is plotting to kill Thakur, spurred on by his Lady Macbeth-like wife, and by guilt over his own secrets.

Kala (Tanveer Hassan), a young, mysterious ex-soldier and self-proclaimed atheist armed with a rifle and a frayed birth certificate, arrives in a small town on Independence Day with a personal quest to find his father, reclaim his birthright, and seek the truth about his mother's rape and murder, and take revenge on the rapist. He is distressed, hungry and arrives without any money.

The rivalry and power struggle between Chairman and Thakur is further exacerbated by Kala's arrival and his mere presence triggers confrontation. Kala discovers a bitter enmity between Thakur and Chairman. Kala and his gun becomes the coveted asset to both the Chairman and Thakur, he attracts the attention of two rival leaders and finds himself approached by both men to take their side. In a heated atmosphere, Kala is the only person in the village with a gun and his rifle allows him to bargain with both men and offers himself as a gun-for-hire to the highest bidder, while pursuing his own quest for knowledge and vengeance. He is employed as Thakur's bodyguard and negotiates the protection of the Thakur in return for cash for which he buys food. However, Chairman secretly approaches him to work as a double agent, as he attempts to overthrow the Thakur and wrest control of the populace. As he sells his services to both sides, he becomes a vital commodity in this small-scale war and gets closer to gaining information to uncover the truth about his past.

In the course of 12 hours — dawn to dusk — a focused Kala played off both sides prior to a final outbreak of violence. Will he find out who raped his mother? Was it the Chairman, proclaimed defender of the people, or was it Thakur, the Hindu landlord busy gobbling up local land on unpaid loans?

== Cast ==
- Ahmed Rubel as Chairman
- Tariq Anam Khan as Thakur
- Tanveer Hassan as Kala
- Anisur Rahman Milon as Tarun
- Jayanta Chattopadhyay as Mustafa
- Tanju Miah as Waris
- Gazi Rakayet as Saifur Rahman
- Hindol Roy as Hillal
- Ishak Dewan as Joglu
- Abdul Hannan as Lulu
- Sri Anil Chandra Dash as Ferdous
- Deepak Suman as Rohmot
- Reetu Abdus Sattar as Chairman's Wife
- Lucy Tripti Gomes as Shobna
- Shaju Mahadi as Head Labourer
- Shushoma Sarkar as Monwara

== Production ==
The Last Thakur is Sadik Ahmed's debut feature film and the first co-production between British distributor Artificial Eye and the UK's National Film and Television School. This new cooperative venture lets NFTS current students and recent graduates create fully funded feature films. It was executive produced by Philip Knatchbull, Nik Powell and Daniel Chamier. The producer was Tamsin Lyons. The crew was made up primarily of NFTS students.

The film is set in present-day Daulatpur, an isolated corner of Bangladesh. The Thakur's home in the film was a semi-derelict mansion of a Maharajah, which had around 400 people squatting in it as the filmed. Some became extras, while the film crew were able to help. They installed toilets and bathrooms to be left behind in return for allowing them to film inside.

The film was shot over 24 days in December 2007, on high definition cameras, a first for Bangladesh. The original set, purpose built, is the largest open air set ever built in Bangladesh.

The cast features some of Bangladesh's best known actors, among them Tariq Anam, Rubel Amin and Tanveer Hussan.

== Release ==
The Last Thakur had its world premiere premiered to a sold out screening at the London Film Festival on 25 October 2008 to a sold-out audience at the National Film Theatre.

The film held a special screening at the Curzon Renoir Cinema in Russell Square on 21 June 2009. The film began its UK theatrical release at the Genesis Cinema, Mile End and at the Ciné Lumière, South Kensington on 26 June 2009. It has since been screened or selected at Dubai International Film Festival, Solothurn Filmtage Celebration of Swiss Film, Munich International Film Festival, Durban International Film Festival and Granada Film Festival.

The DVD of the film was released on 5 October 2009. The DVD extras include a short documentary.

== Reception ==
The Daily Star called The Last Thakur "an intense contemporary Western." Derek Malcolm of London Evening Standard described the film as "taut, well shot and confidently acted." Dan Carrier of Camden New Journal called it "a stylish and beautifully produced film." Redhotcurry.com thought it "features breath-taking locations from an unseen and unknown part of the world." Ethic Now called it "an intense contemporary Bengali 'Western' set in a remote village in the marshlands of Bangladesh."

Anton Bitel of Little White Lies said, "This bleak message is offset by wonderful widescreen cinematography and a soundtrack that perfectly blends influences both eastern and western." Jennie Kermode of Eye for Film said, "All in all, it's a well balanced effort which maintains the proper sense of ironic distance without losing sight of its characters' humanity, even when they lose sight of that of others."

Matthew Turner of View London thought it is "a watchable drama, but the painfully slow pacing detracts from its tried-and-tested plot." Sukhdev Sandu of The Daily Telegraph said, "Its digital photography could be improved and its pacing needs to be more dynamic, but this is a promising calling card." Derek Elley of Variety thought the "pic maintains a gently simmering atmosphere but starts to feel stretched after the first few reels." Philip Kemp of Total Film felt it "expends a bit too much time on talk, with all the action shoehorned into the last few minutes. But it doesn't lack for atmosphere or vivid performances."

Film4 felt "The plot is relatively simple but the execution is baffling... The film ends up looking pretty silly, which is a shame because in many ways it's a worthwhile production." Anthony Quinn of The Independent felt it was "long on smouldering looks and short on narrative bite, makes it difficult to know, and harder to care." Peter Bradshaw of The Guardian thought "The film itself is a disappointment; the action is weirdly inert and monotonous, and the acting is opaque." Tony McKibbin of The List rated it two stars as "a clumsily realised tale of Oedipal tensions... There are mythic overtones in Ahmed's film, but an almost complete absence of sub-text. In both formal and dramatic terms Ahmed offers the heavy-handed... The film may indicate a timeless quality in its story, but the form of its telling indicates a very contemporary patronage of the audience's intelligence."

== Themes and analysis ==
The Last Thakur tells the story of an intense political rivalry between Thakur and the Chairman, laying bare the intrigues of a village riven by political divides. The story tackles taboos subjects such as communal conflict, the genocide and war rapes of 1971, amongst the backdrop of a busy marketplace reminiscent of the ghost towns of the Wild West.

The film is narrated from a child's point of view, the young orphan Waris (played by Tanju Miah, the real life subject of Sadik's previous eponymous short film Tanju Miah), who earns a living serving in a tea hut.

The story is a 'Spaghetti Eastern', about a stranger in a small town who plays two groups against each other. It has been said to be familiar to Akira Kurosawa's Yojimbo, Sergio Leone's A Fistful of Dollars, Takashi Miike's Sukiyaki Western Django, the Coen Brothers' Miller's Crossing or even Walter Hill's Last Man Standing. The bare bones of this scenario can also be discerned in The Last Thakur, set in a rural backwater of contemporary Bangladesh, but Ahmed is less interested in cowboy movie pastiche than in an intense drama of misunderstandings, madness and murder.

== Awards ==
Year	Award	Category	Recipient(s)	Result
2009	South Asian International Film Festival	Grand Jury award for Best Music	Kishon Khan	Won
