= Know Your Newlywed =

2024 romance audiobook by Heather Taylor and Hillary Nussbaum

- Author: Heather Taylor and Hillary Nussbaum
- Language: English
- Genre: Romance
- Publisher: Simon & Schuster Audio, New York
- Publication date: December 10, 2024
- Publication place: United States
- Media type: Audiobook (digital and CD)
- ISBN: 9781797170657
- OCLC: 1467999083
- Website: simonandschuster.com/p/know-your-newlywed

Know Your Newlywed is Heather Taylor and Hillary Nussbaum's debut romance audiobook published by Simon & Schuster on December 10, 2024. It was executive produced by Elena Armas, author of The Spanish Love Deception, and stars Tyler Posey (Teen Wolf) and Mary Mouser (Cobra Kai). This is a full-cast rom-com audiobook about two super-fans of a fictional 90s dating gameshow who, when they hear that it’s being rebooted, decide to team up and fake a marriage to compete.

== Plot ==
Cleo Weaver is a researcher who dreams of getting a PhD in anthrozoology but her guilty pleasure is Know Your Newlywed, the 90s gameshow where married couples compete by answering obscure questions about each other. Even though her mom wants her to focus on a relationship, Cleo is more invested in her career—that is until she comes across Javi Godoy’s dating app profile when she's waiting in Chicago for a delayed flight to Boston after going there on a babymoon with her best friend, Hannah. Hannah deems him perfect when she points out that his profile says he’s “looking for someone to win Know Your Newlywed with.”

They flirt long distance and when Cleo and Javi catch wind of a reboot of their beloved show, they apply on a whim, pretending to be newlyweds themselves. Before they know it, they’re cast as contestants and play the part of a smitten married couple. They think it will only be a one-off episode but when they find out that they can win half a million dollars if they compete, they think it'll be the answer to their dreams—Cleo will be able to pay for school and Javi will be able to quit his job as a project manager at a marketing company and open a food truck. Even though they say they're just in it to play their favorite show and give themselves the future they want, their chemistry is impossible to ignore. As the competition heats up, they quickly become America’s sweethearts.

But the closer they get to the end of the competition, the more guilty they feel. Are their dreams more important than their fellow competitors, especially if Javi and Cleo aren't a real couple? They get to the finale and Cleo, overcome with guilt, throws the show. Javi is distraught and they split before Cleo can explain her actions—or before they share their real feelings. As an attempt to apologize, Cleo cleans up a donated food truck with the help of their friends and presents it to Javi. She explains that their competitors, David and Farah, are expecting a baby. She didn't lose because she didn't care about Javi. It was because her parents split over money problems and she couldn't take the win away from a legitimate couple with a kid on the way. Cleo has feelings for Javi and has decided to stay in Chicago to attend school. With his dreams now in sight, Javi forgives Cleo and they become a couple for real.

== Cast ==
- Mary Mouser as Cleo Weaver
- Tyler Posey as Javi Godoy
- VyVy Nguyen as Hannah
- Graham Halstead as Sam
- Landon Woodson as Winston
- Jenn Lee as Dana
- Adriana Sananes as Marisol
- Vikas Adam as Monty
- Jennifer Jill Araya as Farah and others
- Helen Laser as the KYN Producer and others
- Joniece Abbott-Pratt as Maci, Jordana Williams, and others
- Ramón de Ocampo as Charlie, David Chan, and others
- John Pirhalla as Hank and others

== Reception ==
Heather Booth of Booklist called Know Your Newlywed "one of the most innovative and entertaining audiobooks of the year." Audible selected Know Your Newlywed as one of Audible's 10 best romance listens of 2024 with the editors saying “Mary Mouser as Cleo and Tyler Posey as Javi are perfectly cast.” In AudioFile Magazine's October 2024 publication, they said that "A full ensemble along with several audio enhancements will make the listeners feel a part of Cleo and Javi's reality-TV romance." Libby's publication, Libby Life, listed Know Your Newlywed as one of December 2024's biggest books, encouraging their readers to "laugh your way into the new year with a swoon-worthy, full-cast rom-com with a fake marriage to boot.” Alan Rosenberg of The Valley Breeze thought this "lighter-than-air confection" had a strong full cast but found a specific plot point unrealistic which "lets much of the air out of what is otherwise a pleasant-enough souffle."

== Honors ==
- 2024 - Booklist Editors' Choice: Adult Audio, 2024
- 2024 - Audible's Best Romance Audiobooks of 2024
- 2024 - Booklist Starred Review
- 2024 - Audible Editors Select: December 2024
