= Jaya Aar Sharmin =

2025 Bangladeshi drama film

- Promotional poster
- Directed by: Piplu Khan
- Written by: Nusrat Islam Mati; Piplu Khan
- Produced by: Piplu Khan; Abu Shahed Emon; Jaya Ahsan
- Starring: Jaya Ahsan; Mohsina Akter; Tanjim Saiyara Totini
- Cinematography: Zohaher Musabbir
- Edited by: Nobonita Sen
- Music by: Debojyoti Mishra
- Production companies: Applebox Films Limited; Box Office Multimedia; C te Cinema
- Release date: 16 May 2025
- Country: Bangladesh
- Language: Bengali

Jaya Ar Sharmin (Bengali: জয়া আর শারমিন) is a 2025 Bangladeshi drama film. It is produced by Abu Shahed Emon, Piplu Khan and Jaya Ahsan under the banner of Applebox Films Limited, Box Office Multimedia and C te Cinema. Along with directing the film, Piplu Khan co-wrote the story and screenplay with Nusrat Islam Mati. The lead roles are played by Jaya Ahsan and Mohsina Akter. It is debut film of Jaya Ahsan as a producer. The film tells the story of a relationship between two women trapped during the COVID-19 lockdown.

== Background ==
During the horrific time of the pandemic, when the whole world came to a standstill, Joya and Sharmin get stuck in a house. Amidst the unknown dangers outside, they slowly build their own little world—where, bypassing their fears, they find shelter, safety, and comfort. The relationship, bound in the silent threads of friendship, gradually deepens and becomes meaningful. However, the harsh reality outside the confined walls slowly shakes the foundation of their bond. This narrative, built with a blend of courage, fear, friendship, and the pain of loss, highlights the subtle strains of human relationships touched by the grim times.

== Cast ==
- Jaya Ahsan as Jaya
- Mohsina Akter as Sharmin
- Tanjim Saiyara Totini as Herself, special appearance

== Production ==
The filming was completed within 15 days with limited personnel during the COVID-19 pandemic.

== Release ==
The film's trailer was released on 1 May 2025. The film is released in Bangladesh on 4 theaters on 16 May 2025. The film are released on Chorki on 25 September 2025.

== Reception ==
Wroted by Naveen Islam Noree in The Daily Star's survey "Jaya, portrayed extraordinarily by actress Jaya Ahsan, is a popular celebrity whose life takes a difficult turn upon learning about the suicide of an ignored follower. This tragedy triggers her gradual emotional breakdown, revealing a deep sense of loneliness beneath her public persona. Alongside Jaya is Sharmin, played by the talented Mohsina Akhter, whose powerful performance deepens the film's emotional impact".

== Awards ==
Year	Award	Category	Winner	Result	Ref.
2026	Meril-Prothom Alo Awards	Best Film Director	Piplu Khan	Won	
