= Heather Taylor =

Canadian writer, and director

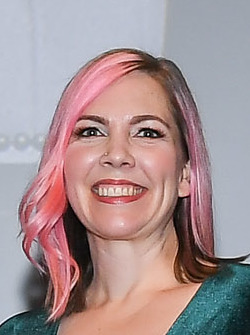
- Heather Taylor at the 2018 Bell Media Prime Time TV Program Showcase
- Born: Edmonton, Alberta, Canada
- Other name: Heather Arness
- Citizenship: Canadian; British; American
- Education: MA creative writing
- Alma mater: City University
- Occupations: Film director, writer
- Years active: 2002–present
- Awards: Wandsworth Community Champion, 2011

Heather Taylor (born in Edmonton, Alberta) is a Canadian writer, and director. Taylor studied music, acting and writing in western Canada and London, England.

== Poetry and performance ==
In the UK, she was a featured performer at events/ venues including Spit Lit, the Victoria & Albert Museum, Borders, Poetry Café, Book Slam, RADA, Camberwell Arts Festival, Harrow Festival, Runnymede International Literature Festival, Penned in the Margins, and Glastonbury Festival. She has also performed at the Arnolfini Gallery (Bristol) and The Guardian Newsroom as part of the Remember Ken Saro-Wiwa project and has been a member of Apples and Snakes and Malika's Poetry Kitchen.

From 2005 to 2007, Taylor toured the two-woman poetry and music show Accents on Words with Aoife Mannix. It was launched at the Poetry Café in London in November 2005 and was performed at a number of venues, including The British Library with BBC Radio London, BAC with Apples and Snakes, The Aran Islands (Ireland) and India with the British Council for Mumbai Poetry Live. In December 2007, Heather Taylor took part in first Belgrade International Poetry festival "Beogradski Trg".

Past projects also include poetry and performance with the BlackFriars Settlement (girls aged 11–16) and the Women's Library. She has two full poetry collections: Horizon & Back (Tall Lighthouse, UK, 2005) and Sick Day Afternoons (Treci Trg, Serbia, 2009).

In 2026, Taylor performed a new piece written for Inua Ellams: Falling Into You R.A.P. Party at the David Rubenstein Atrium at Lincoln Center. It was a night of poetry and music inspired by the 30th anniversary of Celine Dion's seminal album, Falling Into You.

== Theatre and radio ==
As a playwright, Taylor's work has been seen at the Tricycle Theatre, Soho Theatre, Greenwich Theatre, the Pleasance, Etcetera Theatre and Theatre503 in London as well as New Place in St. Albans, G12 in Glasgow as part of the NewWriting NewWorlds Festival. She graduated with an MA with Distinction in Creative Writing from City University. Her play Prisms was the Sunday Play on Resonance FM, 16 December 2010.

== Film and television ==
In 2008, Taylor co-wrote a Bengali western called The Last Thakur. It was a Channel 4 co-production with Artificial Eye as the distributor. The film was received well by critics and Sight & Sound magazine named The Last Thakur "one of the most confident British debut features since Asif Kapadia's The Warrior (2001)... with which it shares an Asian location and language and a welcome belief in the primacy of visual storytelling."

The film premiered at the London Film Festival and was shown at the Dubai International Film Festival, Mumbai International Film Festival, New York Film Festival, and others and finally had its theatrical release in the United Kingdom on 29 June 2009.

The short documentary, Wild West Dream, was produced and co-directed by Taylor through Red on Black Productions and was the official selection at the Atlantic Film Festival and the Edmonton International Film Festival in 2009.

In 2011, Taylor created the web series Raptured, which is distributed by Koldcast. In 2012, she released the food series Home Baked Stories.

Taylor wrote and directed the short horror film, Stitched, in 2016. It was named one of 20 cool things seen at 2016’s Brooklyn Horror Film Festival: "The final, perfect beat of Heather Taylor’s short, Stitched, and Deborah Green’s glowing performance that sells the whole thing." She went on to write and direct Pay to Stay which premiered at the Queens World Film Festival in 2019.

From 2018 to 2019, Taylor was a resident of the Bell Media Prime Time TV Program at the Canadian Film Centre, presented in association with ABC Signature Studios.

Taylor co-created the podcast, Anomaly, with Hillary Nussbaum under the banner of Cereal Made, the company they co-founded. The podcast was included in The Gotham Film & Media Institute's Audio Hub in September 2020 and in 2021, Anomaly was an official selection of Tribeca Festival's inaugural podcast program.

In 2022, Taylor co-created the podcast, Braaains, with her sister, film & television editor, Sarah Taylor. Braaains is a podcast exploring the inner workings of our brains and how film & television portray them and often includes guests with lived experiences of mental illness and disabilities.

Taylor was a story editor on season two of The Hardy Boys (2020 TV series). She co-wrote two episodes: S2.E2 - Conflicting Reports with Nile Séguin and S2.E8 - A Midnight Scare with Laura Seaton. Taylor and Seaton were nominated for a 2023 Writers Guild of Canada Screenwriting Award for their efforts.

During the fall of 2022, Taylor was a TV fellow as part of the RespectAbility Entertainment Lab for entertainment professionals with disabilities.

Taylor wrote and directed Breaking Up, an episode of James Kim's narrative fiction podcast, You Feeling This. The podcast series had its world premiere at The Tribeca Festival 2023.

On December 10, 2024, Taylor's debut audiobook Know Your Newlywed, which she cowrote with Hillary Nussbaum, was published by Simon and Schuster. It was selected as one of Audible's best romance audiobooks of 2024 and Booklist Editors' Choice for Adult Audio, 2024.

Taylor was a co-producer on season one of Revival (TV series). She wrote episode 105 - Triage which aired on July 10, 2025.

== PR, marketing, and strategy ==
Taylor was the Director of Creative Strategy at The Economist from 2015 to 2018. She has held executive roles at Weber Shandwick and Ogilvy and was the North American Editorial Director for Econsultancy. She was the former Corporate Community Manager for the BBC, social media and PR manager for Giffgaff and the former editor and filmmaker for PayPal's Let's Talk social media and consumer advocacy website. While in that role, in addition to PayPal related topics, she regularly produced video interviews with experts in mobile, finance, social media and web development.

In 2011, she was listed by Brand Republic as one of the top 200 most influential bloggers.

Taylor organised the cleanup in Clapham Junction after the London Riots in August 2011 and led what is now referred to as the Broom Army. She won a Wandsworth Community Champion award for her efforts.

== Filmography ==
Year	Title	Notes	Credits
2008	The Last Thakur	Feature film	Writer
2009	Wild West Dream	Short Doc	Director/ Producer
2009	Stay Safe	Short	Writer
2011	Raptured – season 1	Web series	Writer/ Director/ Producer
2011	Book of the Dead	Short	Writer
2012	Home Baked Stories	Web series	Director/ Producer
2012	The Last Job	Short	Writer
2016	Stitched	Short	Director/ Writer
2019	Pay to Stay	Short	Director/ Writer
2021	Anomaly	Podcast	Creator/ Writer
2021	Lethal Love	TV Movie	Writer
2022	The Hardy Boys (2020 TV series)	TV series	Story Editor Season 2 Co-writer Ep. 202 (Conflicting Reports) & 208 (A Midnight Scare)
2023	You Feeling This?	Podcast	Writer/ Director Ep.9 (Breaking Up)
2025	Revival (TV series)	TV series	Co-Producer Season 1 Writer Ep. 105 (Triage)
2026	A Little Park Music	TV Movie	Co-Writer

== Poetry collections ==
- Sick Day Afternoons (Popodnevna Bolovanja) (2009), ISBN 978-86-86337-27-6
- Horizon and Back (2005), ISBN 1-904551-17-3
- She Never Talks of Strangers (2003), a chapbook, ISBN 1-904551-07-6.

== Anthologies ==
- Too Young, Too Loud, Too Different: Poems from Malika's Poetry Kitchen (2022), ISBN 978-1-472155-06-1
- A View from the Lighthouse (2009)
- City Lighthouse (2009), ISBN 978-1-904551-58-4
- Storm Between Fingers (2007), ISBN 1-905233-13-2
- His Rib (2007), ISBN 0-9789695-2-9
- This Poem Is Sponsored By... (2007), ISBN 0-9553431-1-9
- Malika's Poetry Kitchen's Handmade Fire (2006), ISBN 1-905233-10-8
- Future Welcome: The Moosehead Anthology X (2005), ISBN 1-897190-06-9
- Dance the Guns to Silence : 100 poems for Ken Saro-Wiwa (2005), ISBN 1-905233-01-9
- Audition Arsenal for Women in Their 20s: 101 Monologues by Type, 2 Minutes & Under (2005), ISBN 1-57525-396-8
- Tall-lighthouse Poetry Review (2004), ISBN 1-904551-19-X
- In the Criminal's Cabinet (2004), ISBN 0-9546268-1-8
- Teen Angst: A Celebration of Really Bad Poetry (2005), ISBN 0-312-33474-5
