= Davide Cinzi =

Italian cinematographer

- Born: 4 November 1983 (age 42)
- Citizenship: Italy

Davide Cinzi is an Italian cinematographer.

== Early life and education ==
Cinzi graduated from the Surrey Institute of Art and Design (SIAD) with a BA degree in "Film and Video" (now the University for the Creative Arts). He earned an MA degree in "Cinematography" from the National Film and Television School (NFTS).

== Selected filmography ==
- Photos of God, 2009
- The Confession, 2009

== Awards and nominations ==
Academy Awards
Year	Film	Award	Result	Category
2011	The Confession	Oscar	Nominated	Short Film (Live Action)

Student Academy Awards
Year	Film	Award	Result	Category
2010	The Confession	Student Oscar	Won	Honorary Foreign Film

Berlin Film Festival
Year	Film	Award	Result	Category
2010	Photos of God	Golden Bear	Nominated	Short Film (Live Action)

International Emmy Awards
Year	Film	Award	Result	Category
2010	Jamie Johnson	International Emmy Awards	Nominated	Kids:Series
