= University of Science and Technology Chittagong =

Science and Technology University in Bangladesh

University of Science & Technology Chittagong
- বিজ্ঞান ও প্রযুক্তি বিশ্ববিদ্যালয় চট্টগ্রাম
- Crest of USTC
- Other name: USTC
- Motto: পড় / قل (Read)
- Type: Private, research
- Established: 1989; 37 years ago
- Accreditation: Institution of Engineers, Bangladesh; Pharmacy Council of Bangladesh
- Affiliations: University Grants Commission (UGC)
- Academic affiliations: University of Chittagong
- Chancellor: President Mirza Fakhrul Islam Alamgir
- Vice-Chancellor: Vacant
- Academic staff: 355 (includes 70 part-time) (2014)
- Students: 4,203 (2014)
- Undergraduates: 2500+
- Postgraduates: 1500+
- Location: Chittagong, Bangladesh; 22.3615°N 91.7973°E
- Campus: Urban
- Language: English
- Colors: forest green, pale blue
- Website: ustc.edu.bd

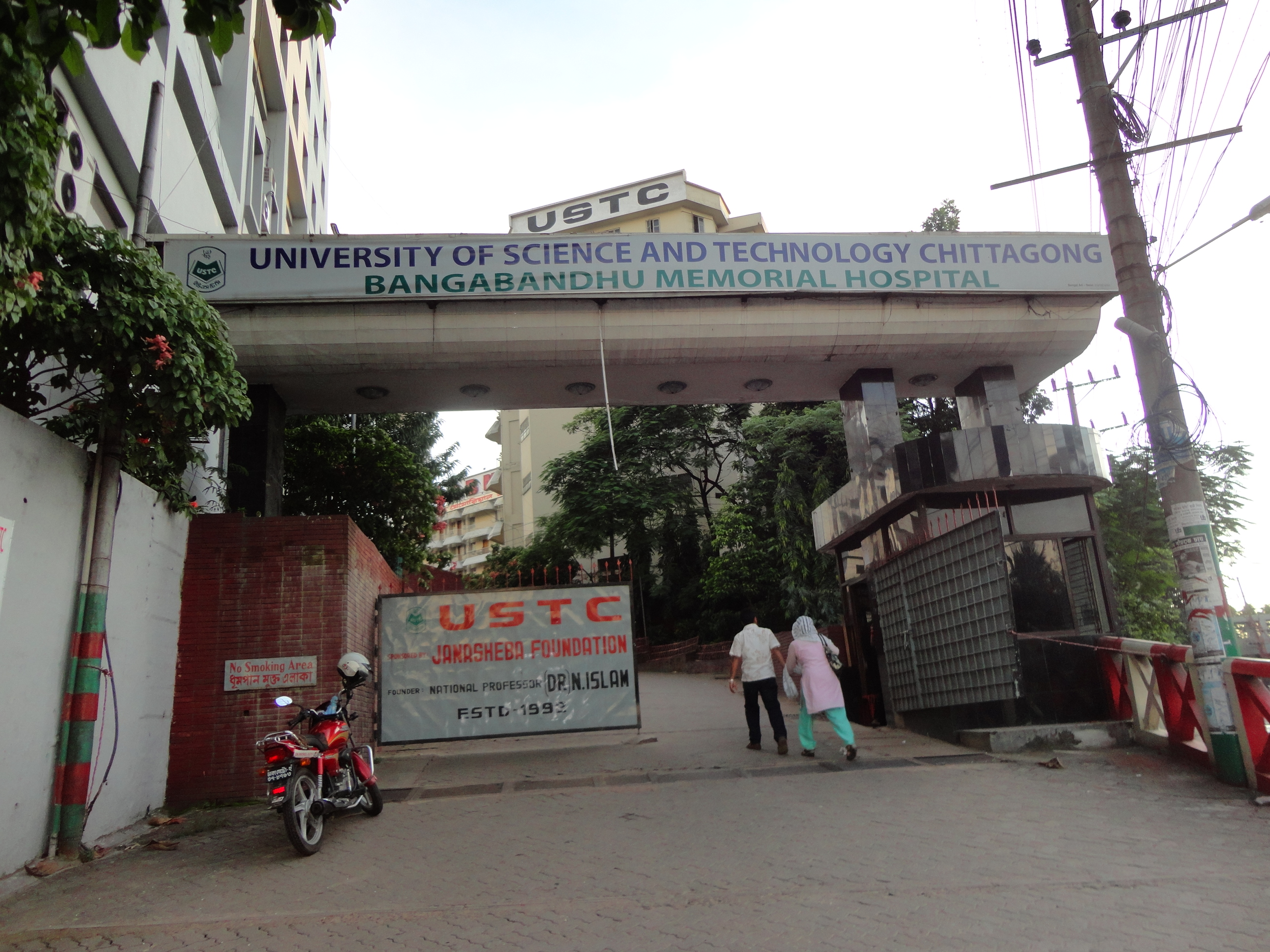
Entrance of the university

University of Science & Technology Chittagong (USTC) (Bengali: বিজ্ঞান ও প্রযুক্তি বিশ্ববিদ্যালয় চট্টগ্রাম) is the first private Research university in Chattogram, Bangladesh along with the first certified private university by University Grants Commission in Bangladesh. At first, it was established with the sponsorship of a private charity on 13 May 1989. Later, it was upgraded to USTC as a full-phased university under the Private University Act of 1992.

== History ==
When USTC was founded in 1989, it had only two professors and nine lecturers. Now, the number of full-time teachers is 285. USTC has 4,200 students. Among these, over 30% are foreign students from India, Nepal, Malaysia, Sri Lanka, Bhutan, Jordan, and Palestine, among others.

== Administration ==
=== List of vice-chancellors ===
- Mohammad Solaiman
- Md. Jahangir Alam
- Nurul Islam

== Academic faculties and departments ==
=== Faculty of Science, Engineering & Technology (FSET) ===
- Department of Computer Science & Engineering
- Department of Electrical & Electronics Engineering
- Department of Electric & Telecommunication Engineering
- Allied Science

=== Faculty of Basic Medical and Pharmaceutical Sciences ===
- Department of Medicine MBBS
- Department of Pharmacy

=== Faculty Life Sciences ===
- Department of Public Health
- Department of Biochemistry and Biotechnology

=== Faculty Business and Entrepreneurial Sciences(FBES) ===
- Department of Business Administration
- Finance and Banking

=== Faculty of Social Science and Humanities ===
- Department of English Language & Literature

== Ranking ==
Indexed	Ranking	Field
Nature	#19(BD) #1(Chittagong)	Health Sciences

== Memberships ==
- Association of the Universities of Asia and the Pacific

== Academic and research collaborations ==
- Universiti Teknologi Petronas
- Universiti Sains Islam Malaysia
- National University of Malaysia
- University of Technology Malaysia
- Taylor's University
- Multimedia University
- Chittagong Veterinary and Animal Sciences University

== Campus ==
=== Medical School - USTC ===
==== Institute of Applied Health Sciences Hospital (IAHS H) ====
The Institute of Applied Health Sciences Hospital (IAHS) was founded on 13 May 1989 with 42 students by Nurul Islam. It got affiliated with Chittagong Medical University in 2017.

===== Approved and recognized =====
- Bangladesh Medical and Dental Council(BMDC)
- Recognized by WHO
- Approved by Medical Council of India & Nepal Medical Council

=== "D" Block Building USTC ===
It is other campus building of USTC, Where taught:

- Faculty of Science, Engineering & Technology (FSET).
- Department of Computer Science & Engineering
- Department of Electrical & Electronics Engineering
- Department of Electric & Telecommunication Engineering
- Faculty of Basic Medical and Pharmaceutical Sciences
- Department of Pharmacy
- Department of Biochemistry and Biotechnology.
- Department of Public Health.
- Faculty of Business Administration.
- Faculty of Social Science and Humanities.
- Department of English Language & Literature.

=== Hospital ===
The university's 220-bed teaching hospital, Institute of Applied Health Science Hospital (IAHS-H)(USTC), is the largest private hospital in Chittagong.

=== Library ===
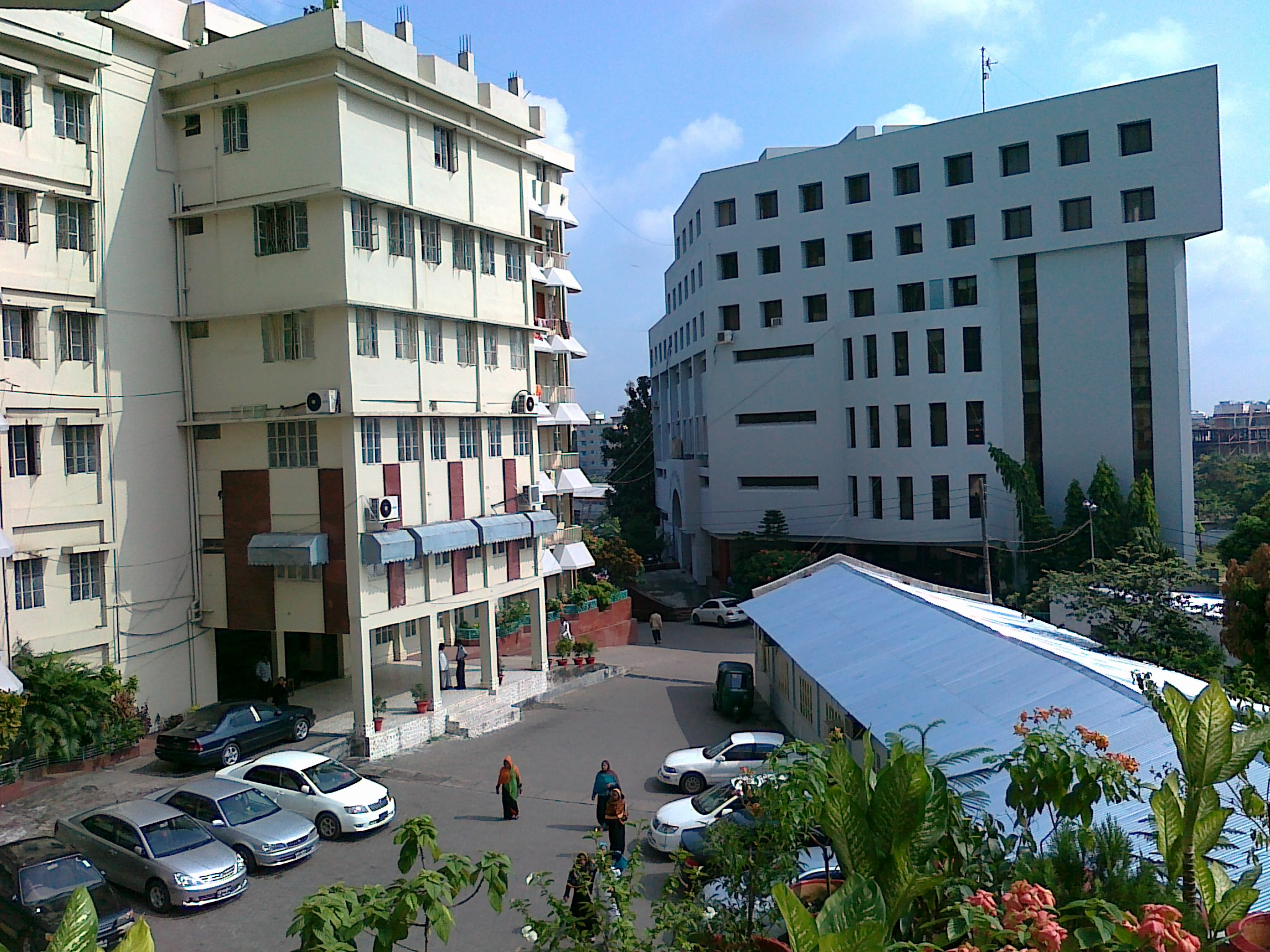
View of the Academic Block (to the left) and Central Library (to the right) from the Old Hospital Building

USTC owns seven-storied library building. The library has three sections comprised by modern technology and has accommodation for 150 readers at a time. USTC provides well-stocked resources for its students in the library. They are as follows:

- Books: 16739
- Journals: 5021
- Books supplied by the British council Library on long-term loan, Chittagong: 50 copies (renewable).
- Audio and Video Cassettes: 100
- Reference resources: 190+
- 4.5 million documents
- Access to 194,000 journals and books in the fields of health, agriculture, environment, applied sciences and legal information

They Have Faculty and Department Wise Seminar Library.

=== Accommodation ===
The university has hostels for male and female students:

- Gulmeher Hall for female students

It can accommodate both foreign and non-local female students. There is one hostel available for male students:

- Syedur Rahman International Hall

It is for foreign students which is located within the campus grounds.

=== Auditorium ===
One of the feature of USTC is its auditorium called Mawlana Bhashani Ausitorium. There is a gallery available for 1,000 audience members.

== Laboratories ==
Each department of the university has laboratories under the specific department.

=== Department of Biochemistry and Biotechnology ===
The only private university in Chittagong that offers Biochemistry and Biotechnology at the University of Science and Technology Chittagong (USTC).

Labs:

1. Laboratory of Biochemistry and Food Science (BFS)
2. Laboratory of Environmental and Marine Biotechnology (EMB)
3. Laboratory of Molecular Biology and Cancer Research (MBC)
4. Laboratory of Microbiology and Immunology (MI)

=== Department of Pharmacy ===
The Pharmacy Department at the University of Science and Technology Chittagong (USTC). There are 15 Labs in the Pharmacy Department:

- Pharmacy Core Laboratory:
  - Inorganic and Physical Pharmacy Laboratory
  - Pharmacognosy and Phytochemistry Laboratory
  - Organic Pharmacy and Medicinal Chemistry Laboratory
  - Pharmaceutical Analysis Laboratory
  - Physiology and Pharmacology Laboratory
  - Pharmaceutical Microbiology Laboratory
  - Pharmaceutical Technology and Cosmetology Laboratory
  - Biopharmaceutics and Pharmacokinetics Laboratory
- Research Laboratory:
  - Centre for Advanced Biomedical Research Laboratory
  - Bio-informatics & Molecular Dynamics Simulation Laboratory
  - Animal Experimental Lab
- Additional Labs:
  - Medicinal Plant Garden and Herbarium Corner
  - Pharmaceutical Industrial Corner
  - Model Pharmacy display center

=== Department of Electrical and Electronic Engineering ===
- Space Technology Laboratory

=== Computer Laboratory ===
The University of Science and Technology Chittagong (USTC) supports research activities through advanced computing infrastructure, including supercomputing resources, and specialized laboratory facilities, enabling faculty and students to conduct scientific and engineering research.

== List of clubs ==
=== Academic Clubs (Co-Curricular) ===
==== Science, Research & Pharmacy ====
- USTC BBTech Science Club
- USTC BBTech Debate Club
- USTC FLS Sports CLUB
- USTC BBTech Blood Donation Club "Roktodhara"
- USTC BBTech Journal Club
- USTC Pharma Science Club
- BBTech Bioinformatics Club USTC - BBCU

==== Technology, Programming & Robotics ====
- FSET Robotics Society
- Programming Club USTC

==== Business, Entrepreneurship, Environment & Sustainability ====
- USTC Business Club
- USTC Green Club

=== Cultural & Literary ===
- USTC Pharma Cultural Club
- USTC Pharma Literary Club
- DoE Cultural Club, USTC
- USTC Cultural Club

=== Debate & Communication ===
- USTC Pharma Debating Club
- USTC BBTech Debate Club
- FSET Debate Club, USTC-FDCU
- DoE Debate Club, USTC
- DoE Language Club, USTC

=== Community Service & Humanitarian ===
- Unite Progress Foundation
- Roktodhara BBTech Blood Donation Club

=== Publications & Journalism ===
- DoE Publications Club, USTC

== Students ==
Out of 1,642 foreign students in Bangladesh in 2012, 1459 students are University of Science and Technology Chittagong (USTC)

Students	Percentage	Country
Local	70%	Bangladesh
Foreign	30%	India, Nepal, Malaysia, Sri Lanka, Bhutan among others.

== Notable alumni ==
- Amir Hamja, photojournalist, The New York Times
- AFM Solaiman Chowdhury, secretary, Ministry of Textiles and Jute
- Md. Noorul Karim, chairman, Chattogram Development Authority
