= Nurul Islam (physician) =

Bangladeshi physician and educator

- নুরুল ইসলাম
- Born: April 1, 1928; Mohammadpur village, Chandanaish Upazila, Chittagong District, Bengal Presidency, British India
- Died: January 24, 2013 (aged 84); Dhaka, Bangladesh
- Resting place: USTC campus
- Education: Calcutta Medical College; University of Wales
- Occupations: Physician, educator
- Spouse: Anwara Islam (m. 1962; died 2012)
- Children: Nur-E-Jannat Ayesha Dina; Neena Islam; Ahmed Iftekharul Islam
- Parents: Syedur Rahman (father); Gulmeher Begum (mother)

Nurul Islam (April 1, 1928 – January 24, 2013) was a Bangladeshi physician and educator. In 1987, he was selected as the National Professor of Bangladesh. He founded and served as the vice-chancellor of University of Science and Technology Chittagong. He was a Founding Fellow of Bangladesh Academy of Sciences since 1973. He served as the personal physician of Bangladeshi President Sheikh Mujibur Rahman.

== Early life and education ==
Islam was born on April 1, 1928, in Mohammadpur village, Chandanaish Upazila, Chittagong to Syedur Rahman and Gulmeher Begum. Rahman was a school teacher. Islam was the youngest of eight siblings. He passed SSC from Gachbaria Nityananda Gourachandra Model Govt secondary School and ISc from Calcutta Islamia Science College in 1943 and 1945 respectively. He then earned his bachelor's in medicine from Calcutta Medical College in 1951. He completed MRCP in 1954 and TDD (Diploma in Tuberculosis Diseases) in 1955 from University of Wales.

== Career ==
Islam joined Mitford Hospital and then Dhaka Medical College as an associate professor in 1958, and Chittagong Medical College as a professor in 1962. With Nuffield scholarship, he worked as visiting professor in London during 1963–1964. He was the founder and director of the Institute of Postgraduate Medicine Research (IPGMR) which is later renamed to Bangabandhu Sheikh Mujib Medical University (BSMMU) for 24 years.

He served as the Founding Dean of Faculty of Postgraduate Medicine at the University of Dhaka.

In May 1989, Islam established the Institute of Applied Health and Sciences (IAHS) which was later renamed University of Science and Technology Chittagong (USTC).

== Social activism ==
Islam founded Islamic Medical Mission, Janasheba Foundation and ADHUNIK, an anti-tobacco organization recognized by the World Health Organization. He formulated "The Bangladesh National Drug Policy 1982". He served as the Chairman of Bangladesh First National AIDS Committee and National Drug Administration Committee.

== Personal life ==
Islam was married to Anwara Islam from December 26, 1962, until her death in December 2012. She was a professor at Dhaka Education Extension Center. They had two daughters, Nur-E-Jannat Ayesha Dina, a BUET and IBA graduate serving as the Deputy Program Director of USTC Business Faculty, and Neena Islam, an MBBS, BCS (Health), FCPS and MBA, serving as an associate professor in the Family Medicine Department in USTC. Their son, Ahmed Iftekharul Islam, is serving as the Vice President of the board of trustees of the Janasheba Foundation.

Islam died on January 24, 2013, at the LabAid Hospital in Dhaka. He was buried in the USTC campus.

== Awards ==
A partial list of Islam's awards:

- President's Gold Medal (1963)
- Sitara-i-Imtiaz (1970)
- Fazlul Haque Memorial Award (1982)
- Academy Gold Medal by Bangladesh Academy of Sciences (1982)
- Daymi Award for Religion and Social work (1986)
- Rangdhanu Academy Award for Social Service (1986)
- WHO Commemorative Medal (1990,1992)
- Bhashani Memorial Gold Medal (1993)
- Ibn Sina Medal (1995)
- Independence Day Award (1997)
- Gold Medal-RCP Edin (1999)
- Social Service Award by the Government of Bangladesh (2000)
- Bangladesh Nutrition Society Award (2002)
- Bangla Academy Award (2003)
- Hussain Shahid Suhrawardi Award for tobacco-free society (2003)
- Dr BC Roy Gold Medal and 'Chikitsa Ratna' Award for Medical Science, Kolkata (2003)
- Enriching Communal Harmony & Human Rights Award, Kolkata University, India (2004)
- WHO, DG's Special Award for outstanding work in the field of tobacco control in the South East Asia Region (2005)
- Marie Curie Award for Medical Science (2006)

== Books ==
Islam wrote total 27 books and over 100 articles in international medical journals.

- Tobacco Smoking : Opinions, Questions & Answers
- Medical Diagnosis & Treatment
- Tropical Eosinophilia
- Essential Drugs for Village Practice
- Prescription and Professionals
- Something About Health
- Some Thoughts
- Jibon Srotay (In the stream of life)
- History of IPGMR
- Bangabandhu (in the eyes of his personal physician)
- Thoughts on Complementary Medicine
