= Hasina: A Daughter's Tale =

Bangladeshi historical docudrama film

- Theatrical release poster
- Directed by: Piplu Khan
- Written by: Piplu Khan
- Produced by: Centre for Research and Information; Applebox Films
- Starring: Sheikh Hasina; Sheikh Rehana
- Narrated by: Sheikh Hasina as herself; Sheikh Rehana as herself
- Cinematography: Sadik Ahmed
- Edited by: Navnita Sen
- Music by: Debojyoti Mishra
- Production company: Applebox Films
- Distributed by: CRI
- Release date: 16 November 2018 (Bangladesh)
- Running time: 70 minute
- Country: Bangladesh
- Language: Bengali

Hasina: A Daughter's Tale is a 2018 Bangladeshi independent historical docudrama directed by Piplu Khan, based on the life of Sheikh Hasina, the tenth Prime Minister of Bangladesh. The film was jointly produced by the Centre for Research and Information and Applebox Films. It stars Sheikh Hasina as herself in the title role, and her younger sister Sheikh Rehana as herself.

The film covers and refers to the assassination of Hasina's father, Sheikh Mujibur Rahman, along with most of her family in 1975.

== Cast ==
- Sheikh Hasina as herself and narrator
- Sheikh Rehana as herself and narrator

== Production ==
The film is an Applebox Films project. The cinematography of the film has been done by Sadik Ahmed, and editing by Navnita Sen. The camera and electrical departments were led by Amir Hamja.

== Music ==
The music was scored by Debojyoti Mishra. The film has two more tracks, one of them sung by Piplu himself.

== Release ==
The premiere of Hasina: A Daughter's Tale, a docudrama on the life of Bangladeshi Prime Minister Sheikh Hasina, was held at Star Cineplex located at Bashundhara City Shopping Complex in Dhaka on 15 November 2018 and the film was internationally released at Star Cineplex on 16 November 2018. The trailer of the film was released on all social media platforms on the 71st birthday of Sheikh Hasina on 28 September 2018.
