= Tanju Miah =

- Directed by: Sadik Ahmed
- Written by: Sadik Ahmed
- Produced by: Tamsin Lyons
- Starring: Tanju Miah
- Cinematography: Sadik Ahmed
- Edited by: Michael Ho
- Music by: Birger Clausen
- Production company: National Film and Television School
- Distributed by: National Film and Television School
- Release date: 2006 (Toronto)
- Running time: 13 minutes
- Country: United Kingdom
- Language: Bengali

Tanju Miah (Bengali: তানজু মিয়া) is a 2006 British short documentary film directed and written by Sadik Ahmed. The film is about the eponymous Tanju Miah who after the disappearance of his mother is forced to fend for himself while waiting for her to return.

== Summary ==
The documentary follows the day-to-day life of a boy growing up in rural Bangladesh. Seven-year-old Tanju Miah has been forced to fend for himself after his mother abandoned him – apparently, she was badly shaken up after getting beaten by her husband. Miah works to earn a living while waiting for the day that his mother returns.

In a roadside café, Miah clears off tables and mops the floor. He dreams of one day becoming very rich by begging of someday becoming a famous singer, so his mother could hear his song.

== Production ==
Sadik Ahmed found Tanju's story while working on another documentary project in Bengal. The film was funded by the National Lottery.

== Release ==
Tanju Miah received its North American premiere at the Toronto International Film Festival in September 2006. It was also screened at the 2006 Sundance Film Festival and the International Documentary Film Festival Amsterdam. The film was also screened for two months at the Curzon Cinemas in 2007.

== Reception ==
Mark Dening of The New York Times said of Tanju Miah, "the uncharitable realities of his existence are never far away as he struggles to hold on to his hope and his dignity in the face of long odds." British Council Film said, "Director Sadik Ahmed uses a series of graceful scenes to build a psychologically complex portrait of a child who might otherwise disappear into statistics."

== The Last Thakur ==
In Sadik's following film The Last Thakur, Tanju Miah, narrated and played the role of the young orphan Waris who earns a living serving in a tea hut.

== Awards and nominations ==
Year	Award	Category	Recipient(s)	Result
2006	Encounters International Film Festival	Kodak/NAHEMI Cinematography	Sadik Ahmed	Won
2006	Grierson Awards	Bloomberg Award For Best Newcomer		Runner-up
2006	Kodak Student Commercial Awards	Best Cinematography		Won
2007	Royal Television Society Student Television Awards	Best Factual Film	Sadik Ahmed, Michael Ho, Kieron Wolfson, Dilip Harris, Birger Clausen	Won
