= The Confession (2010 film) =

- Film poster
- Directed by: Tanel Toom
- Written by: Caroline Bruckner; Tanel Toom
- Produced by: Emily Williams
- Starring: Lewis Howlett; Joe Eales
- Cinematography: Davide Cinzi
- Edited by: Marianne Kuopanportti
- Music by: Paul Lambert
- Production company: National Film and Television School
- Release date: 12 June 2010
- Running time: 26 minutes
- Country: United Kingdom
- Language: English

The Confession is a 2010 British melodramatic short film. It was directed by Tanel Toom, and written by Caroline Bruckner and Tanel Toom. The film follows a boy named Sam who can't think of any sins to tell the priest at his first confession. He worries that he won't be a real Catholic if the priest doesn't absolve him of some misdeed. Jacob, Sam's friend, devises a solution in the form of a prank, but the result is tragic.

== Plot ==
Sam, an eight-year-old attending a Catholic school, and his trouble making friend Jacob prepare for their first confession. Their class is given a list of sins that children can confess. These include "bullying" and "swearing" among others. Sam pours over the list but is unable to come up with a sin he has done. Sam asks Jacob what he will confess. Jacob states that he would mention not listening to his mother and locking his sister in the closet. Sam feels like he will not be a true Catholic if he cannot be absolved, so he turns to Jacob to suggest a sin Sam could commit and then confess to.

Jacob and Sam decide to steal Farmer Collins’ Scarecrow and leave it in the middle of the road for him to find while he is driving his tractor to town, committing the sin of "stealing." The plan backfires when Farmer Collins pulls off the main road before he sees the stolen scarecrow. As soon as the farmer leaves, however, another car speeds down the twisted and deserted street and, believing the scarecrow to be a dead body, swerves to avoid it and crashes into a tree. Sam walks up to the steaming car and sees a woman and a little girl alive, but severely dazed and bleeding from the head. The car bursts into flames, while Sam and Jacob flee the scene with the scarecrow. As they are running through the woods, the vehicle explodes in the distance.

Sam and Jacob dump the scarecrow off the cliff by the tree they play by every day. Jacob makes Sam swear never to tell anyone because "it was an accident." Sam is full of guilt. That night he dreams the dead woman, the farmer and his father all know. He is haunted by what he has done.

In school the next day Sam runs out of his class into the bathroom, unable to deal with what he has done. Jacob runs after him and tells him that no one knows that he has to keep it together. Jacob tells Sam to meet him at the tree where they hid the scarecrow after dinner.

During dinner that night Sam’s father mentions that Collins’ scarecrow was missing, leading guilt striven Sam to believe that his father knows what he has done. After dinner he meets Jacob by the tree. Sam wants to tell someone what has happened. Jacob states that if he does Jacob will deny everything because it was Sam’s fault. The two boys start pushing each other, while Sam yells over and over again "it’s not my fault, it’s not my fault." During the fight Sam accidentally pushes Jacob into the same cliff they dumped the scarecrow the day before, killing him.

The next day Sam goes to church early in the morning in his robes to have his first confession. While the Priest states that confession does not start until later, Sam insists that he confess his sins now. The Priest, seeing that something is clearly troubling Sam, agrees.

Sam states "Bless me father for I have sinned, this is my first confession." The Priest gently asks Sam to name his sins. With tears streaming down his face Sam, unable to say all he has done, confesses not listening to his mother and locking his sister in the closet, the same sins his now deceased friend Jacob was going to confess. The Priest declares Sam’s sins to be absolved. The scene changes to the empty cross in the field and then fades to black.

== Cast ==
- Lewis Howlett as Sam, an 8-year-old, Catholic schoolboy, Sam is a good kid with a conscience who prefers to follow the rules. However, his friend Jacob often leads him astray.
- Joe Eales as Jacob, Sam's friend and classmate, Jacob questions conventions. He has a mischievous streak, and ultimately, he lacks a conscience.
- James Simmons as the priest
- Gemma Atkins as the teacher
- Aran Bell as Sam's father

== Awards and nominations ==
Year	Ceremony	Award	Result	Category
2011	Academy Awards	Oscar	Nominated	Short Film (Live Action)
2011	MPSE Golden Reels Awards	Verna Fields Award	Nominated	Best Sound Editing in a Student Film
2010	Student Academy Awards	Student Oscar	Won	Honorary Foreign Film
