= Synchronoff =

- Directed by: Catia Peres
- Written by: András Gerevich
- Produced by: Jules Powell
- Cinematography: Bjørn Ståle Bratberg
- Edited by: Herbert Hunger
- Music by: Mat Davidson
- Production company: National Film and Television School
- Distributed by: National Film and Television School
- Release date: 2006
- Running time: 9 minutes
- Country: United Kingdom
- Language: English

Synchronoff is a 2006 romantic animated short film directed by Catia Peres. The plot follows two characters named Eleanora and Bert who become unsynchronized while dancing and must endeavour to return to the same rhythm. The film was screened at the Bimini Animation Festival, as well as at the Karlovy Vary International Film Festival. The film was nominated for Outstanding Achievement in Sound Editing – Student Film (Verna Fields Award) in 2007.
