= Learning on Screen - The British Universities and Colleges Film and Video Council =

UK nonprofit organization

Learning on Screen - The British Universities Film & Video Council (BUFVC) is a representative body promoting the production, study and use of moving image, sound and related media for learning and research. It is a company limited by guarantee, with charity status, serving schools, colleges and post compulsory education interests in the UK.

== History ==
Founded in 1948 as the British Universities Film Council, the BUFC was established by a group of academic staff from various subject disciplines across the arts, humanities and sciences. In the 1960s the BUFC was allocated core funding from government as a grant-in-aid body of the British Film Institute (BFI). In 1982 the Council left the BFI with the remit to engage with UK higher education, changed its title to British Universities Film & Video Council and obtained recurrent core grant direct from the Department for Education and Science. In the early 1990s, with the re-organisation of UK higher education funding, the BUFVC's PES line was moved to the Higher Education Funding Council for England (HEFCE) and was paid over via The Open University. Since 2015, the BUFVC became known as Learning on Screen.

== Governance ==
Learning on Screen is governed by a board of Trustees who are, largely, elected from the membership.

Learning on Screen has a small staff team and is based in offices in central London. A not-for-profit independent organisation, Learning on Screen is mainly funded by membership fees and subscriptions.

== Learning on Screen's Services and Databases ==
Learning on Screen offers a range of specialist services and aims to know more about moving image and sound content, its meaning, context and scholarly value, than any other UK-based educational body. Some of Learning on Screen's services are delivered online worldwide without charge, whereas other services are only offered under authenticated access to users in the UK or to staff in Learning on Screen member institutions.

At the heart of Learning on Screen is a specialist Information Service. This is the source of much of Learning on Screen's information which is published online. Learning on Screen's termly magazine ViewFinder.

The main online databases/online resources currently delivered by Learning on Screen are:

TRILT–Television and Radio Index for Learning and Teaching which offers the best online information describing broadcast content received from over 500 channels of radio and television and delivered in the UK since 1923. The service currently carries some 36 million records and accumulates data at a rate of 1.3 million records per year. Data is delivered 10 days in advance of transmission and TRILT offers a customisable alert service for users. Users from UK licensed educational establishments which are Learning on Screen members, may also order copies of programmes on DVD or CD post-transmission. (under authenticated access only). You may also try the Demonstration version, which is in open access.

The Researcher's Guide to Screen Heritage is an online directory to UK archives and collections of artefacts relating to the history of moving image and sound. This resource is delivered in open access.

News On Screen contains the world's leading resource for the study of newsreels and cinemagazines. The British Universities Newsreel Database (BUND) carries information on more than 180,000 cinema newsreel stories released into British cinemas between 1911 and 1979. This resource is delivered in open access.

Three large-scale online resources, which are archive collections of Independent Local Radio recordings, are delivered to bona fide users in UK higher and further education in collaboration with Bournemouth University.

== Learning on Screen Television and Radio Services ==
Learning on Screen Off-Air Recording Back-Up Service - Learning on Screen records and retains, under licence and copyright exception, some 44,000 hours per year of UK television and radio content. Nearly two decades of these recordings are held from June 1998 onwards. The channels recorded are: BBC One, BBC Two, BBC Three (Note: Up to February 2016, when it moved online, and recorded again when it returned to terrestrial in February 2022), BBC Four, ITV1, Channel 4, More4, Channel 5, Sky News and BBC News. BBC Radio 4 and BBC Radio 4 Extra are also now recorded and retained. Copies may only be supplied to staff in subscribing member institutions which also hold an Educational Recording Agency (ERA) licence.

BoB (Box of Broadcasts) this is a shared online service for universities and colleges in the UK which also have current ERA licences. It offers staff and students the opportunity to record and retain streamed copies of programmes (and extracts from programmes) in their own personal online play-lists. It is a form of scholarly 'see it again/hear it again' service which retains programme copies as long as the users require them to be retained (unlike most broadcasters' equivalent online services which retain copies for a relatively short time only). As of July 2022 it contained over 3 million broadcasts.

TV Times Index (TVTip) provides a unique searchable index to the London edition of the TVTimes, the listings magazine for ITV broadcasts, from September 1955 to March 1985. TVTiP allows users to search for programmes, production staff and performers. It contains approximately 250,000 records.

This Week was a leading ITV current affairs series, running from January 1956 to December 1992. From 1978 to 1986 it was known as TVEye. The This Week database is a record of the entire production history of the series. It has been enhanced by the contributions of expert researchers and information shared with the project by FremantleMedia and used with their permission. This Week is accessed via the Learning on Screen website and is authenticated by Athens jointly with the TV Times Project database (TVTiP). It is free at point of access to all staff and students in further and higher education institutions in the United Kingdom and to Learning on Screen members.

== News on Screen ==
Learning on Screen is responsible for the world's leading resource for the study of newsreels and cinemagazines, at the heard of which is a central database holding over 180,000 records. Associated with these records are 80,000 downloadable documents offered as PDFs taken from original documentation (scripts, running orders, dope sheets and ephemera) from the original news production files. Additionally, the database can be used to access some 40,000 British Pathe newsreel items online. The BUND also carries information on content delivered as Cinemagazines - longer form single subject items included in British cinema programmes and some which were only shown to overseas audiences. This resource is delivered open access as part of the News On Screen section of the website.

Learning on Screen has also published several books related to this area including Yesterday's News: The British Cinema Newsreel Reader (2002, ISBN 0-901299-73-1) edited by Luke Mckernan; Filming History: The memoirs of John Turner, newsreel cameraman (2001, ISBN 0-901299-72-3) and Projecting Britain: The Guide to British Cinemagazines (2008, ISBN 978-0-901299-78-9) edited by Emily Crosby and Linda Kaye.

== Shakespeare in Film, Television, Radio and Online ==

One of Learning on Screen's main educational resources is its International Database of Shakespeare on Film, Television and Radio. This authoritative online database of Shakespeare-related content is continually growing and is international in scope. It holds over 9,600 records dating from the 1890s to the present day. Learning on Screen has also published two books on the subject: As You Like It: Audiovisual Shakespeare (ISBN 0901299634) edited by Cathy Grant (1992) and Shakespeare on Film, Television and Radio: The Researcher's Guide (ISBN 978 0901299796) edited by Olwen Terris, Eve-Marie Oesterlen and Luke McKernan (2009).

== Learning on Screen Publishing ==
Learning on Screen publishes the termly journal ViewFinder online.

== Learning on Screen Events ==
Annually, Learning on Screen holds the Learning on Screen Awards. Learning on Screen also organises a range of courses on need-to-know topics for university staff and researchers.
