= Verna Fields Award =

Film sound editing award for students

The Verna Fields Award is the Golden Reel Award which is annually presented by Motion Picture Sound Editors to a filmmaking student in order to recognize the excellence of their sound editing work. Luke Dunn Gielmuda of the Australian Film Television and Radio School won the 1998 award for his work on Preoccupied. At the 2004 Golden Reel Awards held at Century Plaza Hotel, Manny Holihan won the Verna Fields Award.

== 2006 ==
Winner: Crooked Mick

Nominees:

- Afterlife
- Below the Silence
- Danya
- The Resurrectionist

== 2007 ==
Winner: Temerario

Nominees:

- Bio Rhythm
- Dalton Jones
- Flapwing and the Last Work of Ezekiel Crumb
- Synchronoff

== 2008 ==
Winner: Shot Open

Nominees:

- For the Love of God
- The Hollow Tree
- Procrastination
- Sea of Tranquility

== 2009 ==
Winner: Mummy's Boy

Nominees:

- Cupid
- Elephants
- Four
- Joyets
- Street Angel

== 2010 ==
Winner: Scarecrow

Nominees:

- The End of the Line
- The GodMother
- The Incredible Story of My Great Grandmother Olive
- Yellow Belly End

== 2011 ==
Winner: Stanley Pickle

Nominees:

- The Confession
- En Route
- Psychosis
- Zbigniev's Cupboard

== 2012 ==
Winner: The Pride of Wade Ellison

Nominees:

- Damned
- Inferno
- The Maiden and the Princess
- The Pride of Wade Ellison
- The Secret Numbers

== 2013 ==
Winner: Head Over Heels

Nominees:

- Dawn
- Elie's Overcoat
- Exedia Nation
- Fragments
- Head Over Heels
- In Aeternam
- My Face is in Space
- Stumble

== 2014 ==
Winner: Robomax

Nominees:

- Anamnesis
- First Light
- If You're Serious
- The Magnificent Lion Boy
- Miss Todd
- Robomax
- Sleeping With The Fishes

== 2015 ==
Winner: Sea Odyssey

Nominees:

- Sin Frontera
- The Night Guardian
- Hominid
- Sea Odyssey
- Posthumous

== 2021 ==
Winner: Build Me Up (Supervising Sound Editor: Wong Hui Grace)

Nominees:

- Cocon (Supervising Sound Editor: Freija Hogenboom, Sound Effects Editor: Camiel Povel, Foley Artist: Annika Epker)
- Build Me Up (Supervising Sound Editor: Wong Hui Grace)
- Do Not Feed the Pigeons (Supervising Sound Editor: Joe De-Vine)
- The Many Faces of Ava (Supervising Sound Editor: Dominika Latusek)
- Other Half (Supervising Sound Editor: Zoltán Kadnár)
- Night of the Living Dread (Supervising Sound Editor: Miles Sullivan)
- Pressure (Supervising Sound Editor: Antek Rutczynski)
- Échale Ganas, The Villa’s Tacos Story (Supervising Sound Editor: Mingxin Qiguan)

== 2022 ==
Winner: Brutal (Supervising Sound Editor: Dan Hibbert)

Nominees:

- Ascent (Supervising Sound Editor: Guldem Masa)
- Brutal (Supervising Sound Editor: Dan Hibbert)
- Enemy Alien (Supervising Sound Editor: Jonathan Mendolicchio)
- Entertain Me (Supervising Sound Editor: Sam Titshof, Foley Artists: Nancy Konijn, Levi Cuijpers)
- Key of See (Supervising Sound Editor: Manuel Simon, Foley Artists: Conor Van Slyke, George Allan)
- Spring Roll Dream (Supervising Sound Editor: Carlos Eligio San Juan Juanchi)
- This Is Your Captain Speaking (Supervising Sound Editor: Zoé Beekes, Dialogue Editor: Felicia Koolhoven, Sound Effects Editors: Teun Beumer, Jurriaan Kruithof)
- Whiteboy (Supervising Sound Editor: Oliver Mapp)

== 2023 ==
Nominees:

- Buyers Beware (Supervising Sound Editor: Matt Lemberger)
- Canary (Supervising Sound Editor: Mengchen Sun)
- Dive (Supervising Sound Editor: Simon Panayi)
- From The Top (Supervising Sound Editor: Etienne Kompis)
- Gossip (Supervising Sound Editor: Itzel Gonzalez Estrada)
- Heimen (Supervising Sound Editor: Eran Brinkman, Sound Effects Editor: Sam Titshof)
- The Tornado Outside (Supervising Sound Editor: Marios Themistokleous)
- Tree of Many Faces (Supervising Sound Editor: Siim Skepast)
