= PHP Family =

Bangladeshi conglomerate

- Type: Private
- Industry: Steel; Automobiles; Textile manufacturing; Electric power; Cement; Ship breaking; Galvanizing; Agriculture; Fisheries
- Founded: 1969; 57 years ago
- Founder: Sufi Mohamed Mizanur Rahman
- Headquarters: PHP Centre, 40/1, Zakir Hossain Road, Khulshi, Chittagong, Bangladesh
- Area served: Worldwide
- Key people: Sufi Mohammed Mizanur Rahman (Chairman); Mohammed Mohsin (Vice-Chairman)
- Website: phpfamily.com

PHP Family (previously known as PHP Group of Industries) is a Bangladeshi conglomerate based in Chittagong. It was founded in 1969 by Sufi Mohammed Mizanur Rahman who is the chairman of the group as of 2018.

== Controversies ==
On 4 March 2022, Department of Environment filed a case against PHP Float Glass Industries Limited for blocking a waterfall by building dams and razing hills at Barabkunda of Sitakunda upazila in Chattogram in order to water their mango orchard. The lawsuit accused the managing director of PHP Family, manager of the company's mango orchard project, and head of human resources of the company. A summon was issued against them instructing to remove the dam within 7 days. However it was found that the dam was not removed even after 14 days after it was issued.
