= Sitakund Degree College =

Sitakunda Degree College
- সীতাকুন্ড ডিগ্রি কলেজ
- Type: Private College
- Established: 1968; 58 years ago
- Founders: Mrs. Nirupoma Mukharji
- Location: Sitakunda, Chittagong District, 4310, Bangladesh
- Website: sitakundacollege.edu.bd

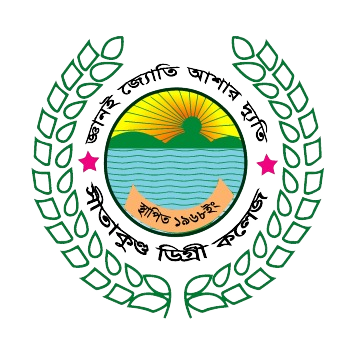

Sitakunda Degree College (Bengali: সীতাকুন্ড ডিগ্রি কলেজ) is a non-government degree college in Sitakunda, Chittagong District, Bangladesh, established in 1968. The college was founded by Mrs. Nirupoma Mukharji. The college stands on her own property.

== See also ==
- List of colleges in Chittagong
