= Sufi Mohammed Mizanur Rahman =

Bangladeshi industrialist

- সুফি মুহাম্মদ মিজানুর রহমান
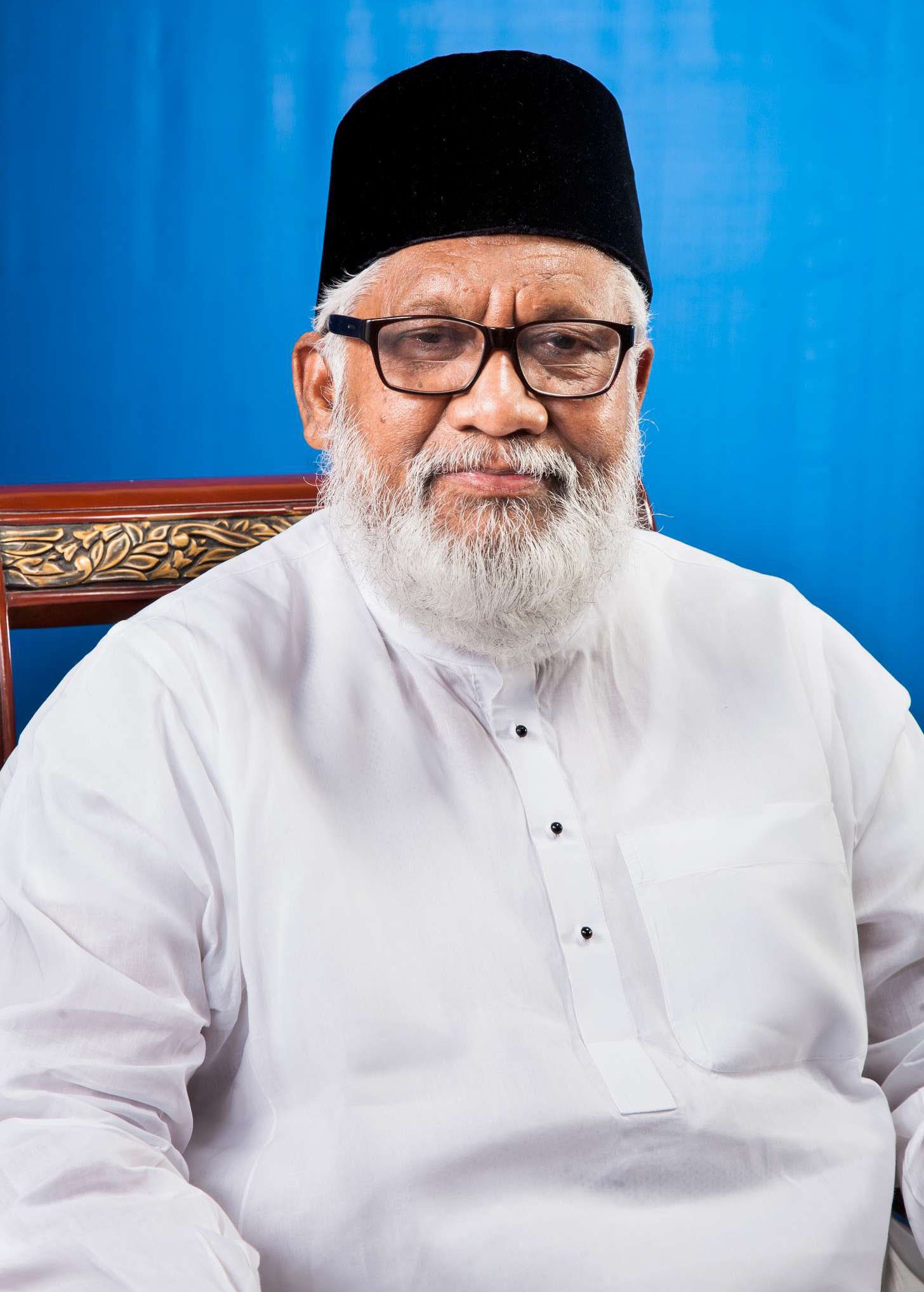
- Education: Government Tolaram College
- Occupation: Industrialist
- Organization: PHP Family
- Awards: Ekushey Padak (2020)

Sufi Mohamed Mizanur Rahman is a Bangladeshi industrialist known as the founding chairman of the PHP Group of Industries, a Bangladeshi conglomerate. In 2020, in recognition of his contributions to social welfare and industrial development, the government of Bangladesh conferred upon him the Ekushey Padak, the nation's second-highest civilian honor.
