= Piplu Khan =

Bangladeshi filmmaker

Piplu R Khan
- Born: Rezaur Rahman Khan; Chittagong, Bangladesh
- Citizenship: Bangladesh
- Education: Graduated
- Alma mater: National University
- Occupations: Filmmaker, writer
- Years active: 2010s-present
- Known for: Hasina: A Daughter's Tale (2018)

Rezaur Rahman Khan, popularly known as Piplu R Khan, Piplu Khan, or simply Piplu is a Bangladeshi filmmaker. After making several television advertisements, he found major success after directing the historical docudrama Hasina: A Daughter's Tale in 2018. The directorial debut film was based on the life of Sheikh Hasina, former and 10th Prime Minister of Bangladesh. In his commercials making career, he has worked with some of the brands like Grameenphone, Unilever in Bangladesh as well as in the Mumbai, India. He also sung a song in Hasina: A Daughter's Tale.

== Early life and education ==
Rezaur Rahman Khan was born in Chittagong, Bangladesh. He currently lives in Dhaka.

Piplu received almost all his academic education from Chittagong. He studied at Government Muslim High School for secondary education. Then he got into Government College of Commerce. After completed Higher Secondary School Certificate, he got into University of Dhaka. Though he could not complete the degree due to family and personal reasons. After a year Piplu went back to Chittagong for completing graduation .

== Filmography ==
=== Feature films ===
Year	Title	Credits as	Notes	Ref.
2018	Hasina: A Daughter's Tale	Director, screenplay writer and producer	Documentary drama; based on Sheikh Hasina's family story	
2022	Ei Muhurte	Director	Anthology film on Chorki; segment of 'Kolpona'	
2025	Boli – The Wrestler	Producer	Won — The Best Film Award at the 28th Busan International Film Festival	
2025	Jaya Aar Sharmin	Director, screenplay writer and producer	Won – Meril-Prothom Alo Awards for Best Film Director	

=== TVCs ===
Year	Title	Brand/Company
2016	"Neel Jama"	Grameenphone
2016	"Spark"	Grameenphone
2016	"Nestle Alpino"	Nestlé
2016	Hero HF Deluxe	Hero
2016	"Landlord"	Pepperfry
2016	"Tanishq"	Tanishq
2016	"Smile"	Symphony
2016	"FIFA"	Coca-Cola
2016	Bengal Classical Music Festival	Bengal Foundation
2016	"Joya Sanetery Napkin"	Joya
2016	"Doctor and Patient"	Bloop
2016	"Father and Daughter"	Bloop
2016	"Friends"	Bloop
2016	"Purnava"	Renata Limited
2016	"Friends"	Ispahani
2016	"uPVC Pipe"	Navana Engineering Limited
2016	"Mega Offer"	Banglalink
2016	"Anniversary"	Robi
2016	"Proposal"	Robi
2016	"Honesty"	Robi
