= List of Debaters radio episodes =

The Debaters is a Canadian radio comedy show currently hosted by Steve Patterson. It airs on CBC Radio One.

Each episode typically features two debates between two pairs of debaters. The topics are deliberately comedic, with the winner chosen by audience reaction at the end of the debate.

== Series overview ==
The Debaters seasons
Season	Episodes		Originally released		Rank	Ratings
Season	Episodes		First released	Last released	Rank	Ratings
1	32 (+2 re-edits)		September 9, 2006	June 30, 2007	TBC	TBC
2	32 (+8 re-edits)		September 8, 2007	June 21, 2008	TBC	TBC
3	33		September 6, 2008	June 27, 2009	TBC	TBC
4	33		September 12, 2009	August 7, 2010	TBC	TBC
5	34		July 3, 2010	July 16, 2011	TBC	TBC
6	33		September 10, 2011	July 7, 2012	TBC	TBC
7	33		September 8, 2012	July 27, 2013	TBC	TBC
8	31 (+4 extended cuts)		August 31, 2013	August 30, 2014	TBC	TBC
9	33		September 6, 2014	July 11, 2015	TBC	TBC
10	33	12	September 12, 2015	December 19, 2015	TBC	TBC
10	33	21	January 16, 2016	July 9, 2016	TBC	TBC
11	33	12	September 9, 2016	December 16, 2016	TBC	TBC
11	33	21	January 14, 2017	June 30, 2017	TBC	TBC
12	33	13	September 9, 2017	December 26, 2017	TBC	TBC
12	33	20	January 11, 2018	June 29, 2018	TBC	TBC
13	33	11	September 14, 2018	December 14, 2018	TBC	TBC
13	33	22	January 11, 2019	June 21, 2019	TBC	TBC
14	33	13	September 6, 2019	December 17, 2019	TBC	TBC
14	33	20	January 10, 2020	June 27, 2020	TBC	TBC
15	33	13	September 11, 2020	December 23, 2020	TBC	TBC
15	33	20	January 8, 2021	June 25, 2021	TBC	TBC
16	33	13	September 10, 2021	December 17, 2021	TBC	TBC
16	33	20	January 7, 2022	July 1, 2022	TBC	TBC
17	33 (+40 extended cuts)	13	September 8, 2022	December 23, 2022	TBC	TBC
17	33 (+40 extended cuts)	20	January 12, 2023	July 29, 2023	TBC	TBC
18	33	13	September 7, 2023	December 13, 2023	TBC	TBC
18	33	20	January 3, 2024	June 20, 2024	TBC	TBC
19	33	13	September 5, 2024	December 12, 2024	TBC	TBC
19	33	20	January 2, 2025	TBC	TBC	TBC

== Season 1 (2006-07) ==
This is a list of episodes from season one of The Debaters on CBC Radio. All 32 episodes were hosted by Shaun Majumder, and the full season was released to iTunes on May 15, 2007.

No. in season	No. in series	Title	Host	Debaters	Original air date	Production code
1	1	"Immigration & Prostitution"	Shaun Majumder	Al Rae vs. Paul Bae (Immigration) & Gary Jones vs. Deb Kimmett (Prostitution)	September 9, 2006	101
2	2	"Free Speech & The Internet"	Shaun Majumder	Glen Foster vs. Trevor Boris (Free Speech) & Bruce Clark vs. Brad Muise (The Internet)	September 16, 2006	102
3	3	"Same Sex Marriage & The Military"	Shaun Majumder	Deb Kimmett vs. Al Rae (Same Sex Marriage) & Irwin Barker vs. Simon Rakoff (The Military)	September 23, 2006	103
4	4	"Cosmetic Surgery & Spanking"	Shaun Majumder	Deborah Williams vs. Diana Frances (Cosmetic Surgery) & Erica Sigurdson vs. Ian Boothby (Spanking)	September 30, 2006	104
5	5	"Health Care & Space"	Shaun Majumder	Deb Kimmett vs. Irwin Barker (Health Care) & Bruce Clark vs. Gary Jones (Space)	October 7, 2006	105
6	6	"Don Cherry & Psychotherapy"	Shaun Majumder	Peter Kelamis vs. Dan Licoppe (Don Cherry) & Erica Sigurdson vs. Jeff Rothpan (Psychotherapy)	October 14, 2006	106
7	7	"Celebrities & Smoking"	Shaun Majumder	Elvira Kurt vs. Scott Thompson (Celebrities) & Al Rae vs. J.P. Mass (Smoking)	October 21, 2006	107
8	8	"Toronto vs. Vancouver & Old Folks"	Shaun Majumder	Gary Jones vs. Tim Rykert (Toronto vs. Vancouver) & Deb Williams vs. Jeff Rothpan (Old Folks)	October 28, 2006	108
9	9	"The Olympics & Mixed Marriages"	Shaun Majumder	Paul Bae vs. Charlie Demers (Olympics) & Simon Rakoff vs. Simon Rakoff (Mixed Marriages)	November 4, 2006	109
--	--	"Free Speech & Same Sex Marriage (RE-EDIT)"	Shaun Majumder	Trevor Boris vs. Glen Foster (Free Speech) & Deborah Kimmett vs. Al Rae (Same Sex Marriage)	November 11, 2006	---
10	10	"Arranged Marriage & Marijuana"	Shaun Majumder	Diana Frances vs. "The Maharani" Veena Sood (Arranged Marriages) & Irwin Barker vs. Sean Proudlove (Marijuana)	November 18, 2006	110
11	11	"U.S. Foreign Policy & U.S./Canada Merger"	Shaun Majumder	Danny Bevins vs. Al Rae (U.S. Foreign Policy) & Marc Maron vs. Simon Rakoff (U.S./Canada Merger)	November 25, 2006	111
12	12	"Christmas & Fur"	Shaun Majumder	Dan Redican vs. Simon Rakoff (Christmas) & Carrie Gaetz vs. Steve Patterson (Fur)	December 9, 2006	112
13	13	"Global Warming & Religion"	Shaun Majumder	Glen Foster vs. Albert Howell (Global Warming) & Deb Kimmett vs. Greg Malone (Religion)	December 16, 2006	113
--	--	"Health Care & Spanking (RE-EDIT)"	Shaun Majumder	Unknown	December 30, 2006	---
14	14	"Hip Hop & School Uniforms"	Shaun Majumder	Jonny Harris vs. Irwin Barker (Hip Hop) & Cathy Jones vs. Jan Whalen (School Uniforms)	January 6, 2007	114
15	15	"Three Strikes & Food Liability"	Shaun Majumder	Mary Walsh vs. "That Canadian Guy" Glen Foster (Three Strikes) & Ed Macdonald vs. Gavin Crawford (Food Liability)	January 13, 2007	115
16	16	"Bilingualism & The Monarchy"	Shaun Majumder	Dan Redican vs. Derek Seguin (Bilingualism) & Deb McGrath vs. Rick Currie (The Monarchy)	January 27, 2007	116
17	17	"Adult Kids & Native Rights"	Shaun Majumder	Pat McKenna vs. Deb Kimmett (Adult Kids) & Simon Rakoff vs. Don Kelly (Native Rights)	February 3, 2007	117
18	18	"Customer Service & Protective Parents"	Shaun Majumder	Carrie Gaetz vs. Pat McKenna (Customer Service) & Irwin Barker vs. Elvira Kurt (Protective Parents)	February 10, 2007	118
19	19	"Panhandling & Technological Innovation"	Shaun Majumder	Dave Nystrom vs. Irwin Barker (Panhandling) & Elvira Kurt vs. Albert Howell (Technological Innovation)	February 17, 2007	119
20	20	"Alberta is Good & Calgary vs. Edmonton"	Elvira Kurt	Andrew Grose vs. Al Rae (Alberta is Good) & Cris Nannarone vs. Lars Callieou (Calgary as Capital)	March 3, 2007	120
21	21	"Racial Tolerance & Metrosexuals"	Shaun Majumder	Pat McKenna vs. Kenny Robinson (Racial Tolerance) & Tom Rubins vs. Carrie Gaetz (Metrosexuals)	March 10, 2007	121
22	22	"Telephones & High School Reunions"	Elvira Kurt	Roman Danylo vs. Neil Grahn (Telephones) & Brad Muise vs. Cory Mack (High School Reunions)	March 17, 2007	122
23	23	"Lies in Marriage & Gambling"	Elvira Kurt	Ellie Harvie vs. Andrew Grose (Lies in Marriage) & Jebb Fink vs. Erica Sigurdson (Gambling)	March 24, 2007	123
24	24	"Winnipeg the Capital & Dating Rules"	Shaun Majumder	Irwin Barker vs. Rick Currie (Winnipeg as Capital) & Laurie Elliott vs. Sugar Sammy (Dating Rules)	April 7, 2007	124
25	25	"Opera & YouTube"	Patrick McKenna	Sean Cullen vs. Mary Lou Fallis (Opera) & Debra DiGiovanni vs. Trevor Boris (YouTube)	April 14, 2007	125
26	26	"Louis Riel & Assimilation"	Shaun Majumder	Lorne Cardinal vs. Al Rae (Louis Riel) & Veena Sood vs. Sabrina Jalees (Assimilation)	April 28, 2007	126
27	27	"Family Farm & Toplessness"	Patrick McKenna	Big Daddy Tazz vs. Dean Jenkinson (Family Farms) & Dan Licoppe vs. Erica Sigurdson (Toplessness)	May 5, 2007	127
28	28	"Women's Lives & English"	Shaun Majumder	Tim Steeves vs. Deb Kimmett (Women's Lives) & John Wing vs. Derek Seguin (English)	May 12, 2007	128
29	29	"Cars & Post-9/11"	Patrick McKenna	George Westerholm vs. Steve Patterson (Cars) & Leigh Ann Lord vs. Simon Rakoff (Post-9/11)	May 26, 2007	129
30	30	"Hockey Nation & Prenuptial Agreements"	Shaun Majumder	Gary Jones vs. Peter Kelamis (Hockey Nation) & Erica Sigurdson vs. Ellie Harvie (Prenuptial Agreements)	June 2, 2007	130
31	31	"Advertising & Handguns"	Shaun Majumder	Steve Patterson vs. Winston Spear (Advertising) & Lawrence Morgenstern vs. Erica Sigurdson (Handguns)	June 16, 2007	131
32	32	"Canada's Image & Quebec the Nation"	Shaun Majumder	Ryan Belleville vs. Tim Nutt (Canada's Image) & Derek Seguin vs. Joey Elias (Quebec the Nation)	June 30, 2007	132

== Season 2 (2007-08) ==
This is a list of episodes from season two of The Debaters on CBC Radio. The full season was released on iTunes on December 15, 2009. The season featured a revolving door of guest hosts, including Sean Cullen, Roman Danylo, Patrick McKenna and future regular host Steve Patterson.

No. in season	No. in series	Title	Host	Debaters	Original air date	Production code
1	33	"Camping & Canadian Talent Moving to the U.S."	Sean Cullen	Deb Kimmett vs. Mike Wilmot (Camping) & Tim Steeves vs. Al Rae (Canadian Content)	September 8, 2007	201
2	34	"Teachers & Creationism"	Shaun Majumder	Paul Bae vs. Jeffrey Yu (Teachers) & Leland Klassen vs. Bruce Clark (Creationism)	September 15, 2007	202
3	35	"Vegetarianism & Middle-Aged White Guys"	Sean Cullen	Tim Steeves vs. Laurie Elliott (Vegetarianism) & Glen Foster vs. Kenny Robinson (Middle-Aged White Guys)	September 22, 2007	203
4	36	"U.S.A. Needs Canadian Leadership & Online Dating"	Sean Cullen	Mike MacDonald vs. John Wing (Canadian Leadership) & Jamie Ollivier vs. Allyson Smith (Online Dating)	October 6, 2007	204
5	37	"Cameras and Privacy & Adoption"	Roman Danylo	Greg Proops vs. Elvira Kurt (Cameras and Privacy) & Diana Frances vs. Ian Boothby (Adoption)	October 13, 2007	205
6	38	"Delivery Room Dads & Cloning"	Steve Patterson	Mike Wilmot vs. Kate Davis (Delivery Room Dads) & The Doo Wops (John Catucci and David Mesiano) vs. George Westerholm (Cloning)	October 20, 2007	206
7	39	"Halloween & Aliens"	Steve Patterson	Erica Sigurdson vs. Jon Dore (Hallowe'en) & J.P. Mass vs. Irwin Barker (Aliens)	October 27, 2007	201
8	40	"Technology & Fitness"	Roman Danylo	Marc Maron vs. Darryl Lenox (Technology) & John Wing vs. Erica Sigurdson (Fitness)	November 10, 2007	208
9	41	"Middle Years & Pro Wrestling"	Shaun Majumder	Mike Wilmot vs. Deb Kimmett (Middle Years) & Jeff McEnery vs. Trevor Boris (Pro Wrestling)	November 17, 2007	209
--	--	"Winnipeg the Capital & Advertising (RE-EDIT)"	Shaun Majumder	Irwin Barker vs. Rick Currie (Winnipeg as Capital) & Steve Patterson vs. Winston Spear (Advertising)	November 26, 2007	---
10	42	"Polygamy & Military Service"	Roman Danylo	Mrs. Gupta (Veena Sood) vs. Drew McCreadie (Polygamy) & Damonde Tschritter vs. Derek Seguin (Military Service)	December 1, 2007	210
11	43	"Racial Stereotypes & Flirting"	Sean Cullen	Paul Bae vs. Jeffrey Yu (Racial Stereotypes) & Derek Seguin vs. Erica Sigurdson (Flirting)	December 15, 2007	211
12	44	"Athlete Role Models & Atheism"	Sean Cullen	Darryl Lenox vs. Elvira Kurt (Athletes) & Tim Reichert vs. Charlie Demers (Atheism)	January 5, 2007	212
13	45	"Celebrity Activists & The Death Penalty"	Sean Cullen	Daryn Jones vs. Trevor Boris (Celebrity Activists) & Judy Croon vs. Simon Rakoff (Deathy Penalty)	January 12, 2008	213
14	46	"China & Pets"	Steve Patterson	Alan Park vs. Peter Kelamis (China) & Debra DiGiovanni vs. Kristeen von Hagen (Pets)	January 19, 2008	214
15	47	"Mulroney vs. Trudeau & The Friendly Giant vs. Mr. Dressup"	Steve Patterson	Carrie Gaetz vs. Simon Rakoff (Mulroney vs. Trudeau) & Neil Grahn vs. Dan Redican (Mr. Dressup vs. The Friendly Giant)	January 26, 2008	215
16	48	"Canadian History & Franken Foods"	Steve Patterson	Al Rae vs. Manoj Sood (Canadian History) & Carrie Gaetz vs. Big Daddy Taz (Franken Foods)	February 2, 2008	216
17	49	"Valentine's Day & 'Til Death Do Us Part"	Steve Patterson	Judy Croon vs. "Humble" Howard Glassman (Valentine's Day) & Al Rae vs. Deborah Kimmett ('Til Death)	February 9, 2008	217
18	50	"Reasonable Accommodation & Children of Immigrants"	Steve Patterson	Derek Seguin vs. Sugar Sammy (Reasonable Accommodation) & Angelo Tsarouchas vs. Rodney Ramsey (Children of Immigrants)	February 23, 2008	218
19	51	"Reality TV & Conrad Black"	Steve Patterson	Patrick McKenna vs. Debra DiGiovanni (Reality TV) & Carrie Gaetz vs. Don Kelly (Conrad Black)	March 1, 2008	219
20	52	"St. Patrick's Day & Foul Language"	Steve Patterson	Mike Paterson vs. Derek Seguin (St. Patrick's Day) & David Pryde vs. Scott Faulconbridge (Foul Language)	March 15, 2008	220
21	53	"Colbert and Mercer as News Sources & Gossip"	Steve Patterson	Barry Julien vs. Tim Steeves (Colbert and Mercer) & Heidi Foss vs. Deb Kimmett (Gossip)	March 22, 2008	221
22	54	"Teen Sex & Minor Hockey"	Steve Patterson	Deb Kimmett vs. Elvira Kurt (Teen Sex) & Jocko Alston vs. Denis Grignon (Minor Hockey)	March 29, 2008	222
23	55	"Celebrity Adoption & Big Box Stores"	Steve Patterson	Debra DiGiovanni vs. Sabrina Jalees (Celebrity Adoption) & Elvira Kurt vs. Don Kelly (Big Box Stores)	April 12, 2008	223
24	56	"Steroids in Baseball & Corporate Sponsorship"	Steve Patterson	Harry Doupe vs. Tim Steeves (Steroids) & Brian Stollery vs. Dean Jenkinson (Corporate Sponsorship)	April 19, 2008	224
--	--	"Steroids in Baseball & Lawns (RE-EDIT)"	Steve Patterson	Harry Doupe vs. Tim Steeves (Steroids) & Al Rae vs. Rick Currie (Lawns)	April 21, 2008	---
25	57	"Reserves & Arctic Sovereignty"	Steve Patterson	Dawn Dumont vs. Darrell Dennis (Reserves) & Alan Park vs. Carrie Gaetz (Arctic Sovereignty)	April 26, 2008	225
26	58	"Motherhood & Fashion"	Steve Patterson	John Wing vs. Teresa Pavlinek (Motherhood) & Sabrina Jalees vs. Erica Sigurdson (Fashion)	May 10, 2008	226
27	59	"Pitbulls & The 1980s"	Steve Patterson	Irwin Barker vs. Jonny Harris (Pitbulls) & Mark Forward vs. Debra DiGiovanni (The 1980s)	May 19, 2008	227
28	60	"Scotland & Star Wars vs. Lord of the Rings"	Steve Patterson	Fred MacAuley vs. Al Rae (Scotland) & Greg Morton vs. Ron Sparks (Star Wars vs. The Lord of the Rings)	May 26, 2008	228
29	61	"Small Towns & Palestine"	Steve Patterson	Derek Edwards vs. Mike Wilmot (Small Towns) & Ray Hanania vs. Simon Rakoff (Palestine)	May 31, 2008	229
30	62	"Bottled Water & Showbiz Kids"	Steve Patterson	Graham Clark (comedian)	June 7, 2008	230
31	63	"Summer Camps & Workplace Romance"	Steve Patterson	Toby Hargrave vs. Damonde Tschritter (Summer Camps) & Laurie Elliott vs. Kristeen von Hagen (Workplace Romances)	June 14, 2008	231
32	64	"Lawns & Zoos"	Steve Patterson	Al Rae vs. Rick Currie (Lawns) & Dan Licoppe (as Mel Silverback) vs. Bruce Clark (Zoos)	June 21, 2008	232
--	--	"Colbert and Mercer as News Sources & U.S.A. Needs Canadian Leadership (RE-EDIT)"	Steve Patterson (Colbert) & Sean Cullen (Canadian Leadership)	Barry Julien vs. Tim Steeves (Colbert/Mercer) & Mike MacDonald vs. John Wing (Canadian Leadership)	July 5, 2008	---
--	--	"Reality TV & Polygamy (RE-EDIT)"	Steve Patterson (Reality TV) & Roman Danylo (Polygamy)	Patrick McKenna vs. Debra DiGiovanni (Reality TV) & Veena Sood vs. Drew McCreadie	July 12, 2008	---
--	--	"Big Box Stores & Camping (RE-EDIT)"	Steve Patterson (Box Stores) & Sean Cullen (Camping)	Don Kelly vs. Elvira Kurt (Big Box Stores) & Mike Wilmot vs. Deborah Kimmett (Camping)	July 19, 2008	---
--	--	"Star Wars vs. Lord of the Rings & The 1980s (RE-EDIT)"	Steve Patterson	Greg Morton vs. Ron Sparks (Star Wars vs. Lord of the Rings) & Mark Forward vs. Debra DiGiovanni (The 1980s)	July 26, 2008	---
--	--	"Summer Camps & Cameras and Privacy (RE-EDIT)"	Steve Patterson (Summer Camps) & Roman Danylo (Cameras & Privacy)	Damonde Tschritter vs. Toby Hargrave (Summer Camps) & Greg Proops vs. Elvira Kurt (Cameras and Privacy)	August 2, 2008	---
--	--	"Bottled Water & Athlete Role Models (RE-EDIT)"	Steve Patterson (Bottled Water) & Sean Cullen (Athlete Role Models)	Graham Clark vs. John Buehler (Bottled Water) & Elvira Kurt vs. Darryl Lenox (Athlete Role Models)	August 9, 2008	---

== Season 3 (2008-09) ==
This is a list of episodes from season three of The Debaters on CBC Radio. The full season was released on iTunes on April 4, 2009. The third season was hosted by Steve Patterson.

No. in season	No. in series	Title	Host	Debaters	Original air date	Production code
1	65	"Comic Book Superheroes & Nuclear Energy"	Steve Patterson	Ian Boothby vs. David Pryde (Comic Book Superheroes) & Charlie Demers vs. "That Canadian Guy" Glen Foster (Nuclear Energy)	September 6, 2008	301
2	66	"Awards for Kids & Higher Education"	Steve Patterson	Mike Wilmot vs. Kate Davis (Awards for Kids) & Bruce Clark vs. Irwin Barker (Higher Education)	September 13, 2008	302
3	67	"Green Shift & Filipino vs. Korean Canadians"	Steve Patterson	Debra Kimmett vs. Billy Mitchell (Green Shift) & Ron Josol vs. Paul Bae (Filipino vs. Korean Canadians)	September 20, 2008	303
4	68	"Adult Kids at Home & Che Guevara"	Steve Patterson	Phil Hanley vs. Erica Sigurdson (Adult Kids) & Martha Chaves vs. Charlie Demers (Che Guevara)	September 27, 2008	304
5	69	"Second Hand Shopping & Seniors in the Workplace"	Steve Patterson	John Beuhler vs. Graham Clark (Second Hand Shopping) & Deborah Kimmett vs. Todd Butler (Seniors in the Workplace)	October 4, 2008	305
6	70	"Harper vs. Dion & Minority Governments"	Steve Patterson	Derek Seguin vs. Al Rae (Harper vs. Dion) & Tim Steeves vs. Harry Doupe (Minority Governments)	October 11, 2008	306
7	71	"Hunting & Germs"	Steve Patterson	Pete Zedlacher vs. Erica Sigurdson (Hunting) & Roman Danylo vs. Rebecca Northan (Germs)	October 18, 2008	307
8	72	"Obama and Change & Beauty Pageants"	Steve Patterson	Bruce Clark vs. Darryl Lenox (Change) & Derek Seguin vs. Debra DiGiovanni (Pageants)	November 1, 2008	308
9	73	"Women in Comedy & Human Rights Commissions"	Steve Patterson	Al Rae vs. Erica Sigurdson (Women in Comedy) & Alan Park vs. Simon Rakoff (Human Rights)	November 8, 2008	309
10	74	"NFL vs. CFL & Mom and Pop Restaurants vs. Chains TAPING DATE: TBC "	Steve Patterson	Darryl Lenox vs. Tim Steeves (NFL vs. CFL) & Mike MacDonald vs. Nick Beaton (Restaurants)	November 22, 2008	310
11	75	"Marketing to Kids & The Plastic Bag"	Steve Patterson	Jennifer Robertson vs. George Westerholm (Marketing to Kids) & Steve Levine vs. Glen Foster (Plastic Bags)	November 29, 2008	311
12	76	"Country Music & Tipping"	Steve Patterson	Kenny Robinson vs. Sean Cullen (Country Music) & Irwin Barker vs. Jennifer Grant (Tipping)	December 13, 2008	312
13	77	"Santa Claus & Home Theatre vs. Cinema"	Steve Patterson	Kevin Foxx vs. Mrs. Gupta (Veena Sood) (Santa) & Graham Clark vs. Patrick Maliha (Home Theatres)	December 20, 2008	313
14	78	"The Penny & Age Difference in Relationships"	Steve Patterson	Carrie Gaetz vs. Mark Forward (Pennies) & Debra DiGiovanni vs. Diana Frances (Age Difference)	January 10, 2009	314
15	79	"Letters vs. E-mail & Can Exes be Friends?"	Steve Patterson	Derek Edwards vs. Pat Thornton (Letters) & The Doo Wops (John Catucci and Dave Mesiano) vs. Laurie Elliott (Can Exes be Friends?)	January 17, 2009	315
16	80	"Baby Boomers & Body Building"	Steve Patterson	Bob Robertson vs. Linda Cullen (Baby Boomers) & Aaron Berg vs. Charlie Demers (Body Building)	January 24, 2009	316
17	81	"Growing Up Mixed-Race & Celine Dion"	Steve Patterson	Shaun Majumder vs. Nile Séguin (Growing Up Mixed Race) & Laura Landauer (as Celine Dion) vs. Trevor Boris (Celine Dion)	February 7, 2009	317
18	82	"Economic Downturn & License to Have Kids"	Steve Patterson	Scott Faulconbridge vs. Harry Doupe (Downturn) & Glen Foster vs. Kate Davis (Kid Licenses)	February 21, 2009	318
19	83	"Governors General & Tourism in Developing Nations"	Steve Patterson	Alan Park vs. Don Kelly (Governors General) & David Pryde vs. Martha Chaves (Tourism)	February 28, 2009	319
20	84	"Blogging & Gays in the Media"	Steve Patterson	Harry Doupe vs. Andrew Grose (Blogs) & Darcy Michael vs. Morgan Brayton (Gays in the Media)	March 7, 2009	320
21	85	"Classical Music & Private Schools"	Steve Patterson	Bill Richardson vs. Dan Redican (Classical Music) & Glen Foster vs. Jo-Anna Downey (Private Schools)	March 21, 2009	321
22	86	"Hockey vs. Lacrosse & A Good Man is Hard to Find"	Steve Patterson	Rick Currie vs. Mike Beatty (Hockey vs. Lacrosse) & Jenn Grant vs. Nile Seguin (Good Men)	March 28, 2009	322
23	87	"Symbols: Canada vs. U.S.A. & Censorship"	Steve Patterson	DeAnne Smith vs. Pete Zedlacher (Symbols) & Dan Redican vs. Darren Frost (Censorship)	April 4, 2009	323
24	88	"Do England and France Make Canada Stronger? & Celebrities' Private Lives"	Steve Patterson	Derek Seguin vs. Al Rae (Founding Cultures) & Craig Lauzon vs. Teresa Pavlinek (Celebrities)	April 11, 2009	324
25	89	"Newspapers & Self-Help Books"	Steve Patterson	Al Rae vs. Marc Maron (Newspapers) & Allyson Smith vs. Dan Licoppe (Self Help)	April 25, 2009	325
26	90	"Thrift & Extinction"	Steve Patterson	Andrew Grose vs. Nathan Macintosh (Thrift) & Jen Grant vs. John Beuhler	May 2, 2009	326
27	91	"Tall Women & Visible Minorities"	Steve Patterson	Karen O'Keefe vs. Scott Faulconbridge (Tall Women) & Gilson Lubin vs. Ali Rizvi (Visible Minorities)	May 9, 2009	327
28	92	"Cycling & Facebook"	Steve Patterson	Glen Foster vs. Peter Wildman (Bicycles) & Sabrina Jalees vs. Jebb Fink (Facebook)	May 16, 2009	328
29	93	"Aging & Video Games"	Steve Patterson	Teresa Pavlinek vs. John Wing (Aging) & Dean Jenkinson vs. Tim Nutt (Video Games)	May 23, 2009	329
30	94	"CanCon & Kids and Marriage"	Steve Patterson	Mark Critch vs. Derek Seguin (CanCon) & John Wing vs. Cory Kahaney (Kids and Marriage)	June 6, 2009	330
31	95	"One God or Many? & Do We Spoil Our Kids?"	Steve Patterson	Ron Sparks vs. Sean Cullen (Monotheism) & George Westerholm vs. Maryellen Hooper (Spoiled Kids)	June 13, 2009	331
32	96	"Fist Fights & Young Offenders"	Steve Patterson	Rob Pue vs. Bruce Clark (Disputes) & Mike Bullard vs. Irwin Barker (Crime)	June 20, 2009	332
33	97	"Sexy Newfoundlanders & Car Salespeople"	Steve Patterson	Cathy Jones vs. Jonny Harris (Sexy Newfoundland) & Carrie Gaetz vs. Chuck Byrn (Car Salespeople)	June 27, 2009	333

== Season 4 (2009-10) ==
This is a list of episodes from season four of The Debaters on CBC Radio. The full season was released on iTunes on June 6, 2011. All season four episodes were hosted by Steve Patterson.

No. in season	No. in series	Title	Host	Debaters	Original air date	Production code
1	98	"Swine Flu Hysteria & Making it in the U.S.A."	Steve Patterson	Alonzo Bodden vs. Scott Faulconbridge (H1N1) & Debra DiGiovanni vs. Judy Gold (Making it in the U.S.)	September 12, 2009	401
2	99	"Barbie & Respect"	Steve Patterson	Debra DiGiovanni vs. Elvira Kurt (Barbie) & The Williamson Playboys (Paul Bates and Doug Morency) vs. White Cheddah (Sam Easton)	September 19, 2009	402
3	100	"N Word & Pirates"	Steve Patterson	Shaun Majumder vs. Snook (N Word) & John Ki vs. Darren Frost (Pirates)	September 26, 2009	403
4	101	"Are All Men a Bit Gay? & Class Clowns"	Steve Patterson	Charlie Demers vs. Mike Wilmot (Men are Gay) & Al Rae vs. Mike Paterson and Tim Rabnett (Class Clowns)	October 3, 2009	404
5	102	"Is Alberta Good for Newfoundland? & Tim Horton's vs. Starbucks"	Steve Patterson	John Sheehan vs. Trent McClellan (Alberta/Newfoundland) & Damonde Tschritter vs. Rebecca Kohler (Coffee)	October 10, 2009	405
6	103	"Hecklers & Digital Piracy"	Steve Patterson	Ed Byrne vs. Andy Kindler (Hecklers) & David Pryde vs. Bob Marley (Digital Piracy)	October 17, 2010	406
7	104	"Alberta's Time & Elder Wisdom"	Steve Patterson	Peter Brown vs. Alan Park (Alberta's Time) & Dawn Dumont vs. Andrew Grose (Elder Wisdom)	October 24, 2009	407
8	105	"Karaoke & Air Canada"	Steve Patterson	Paul Bae vs. Neil Grahn (Karaoke) & Al Rae vs. Graham Clark (Air Canada)	November 7, 2009	408
9	106	"Surnames & Robots"	Steve Patterson	Sean Lecomber vs. Erica Sigurdson (Surnames) & Mark Meer vs. Donovan Workun (Robots)	November 14, 2009	409
10	107	"Africentric Schools & Chick Flicks"	Steve Patterson	Jean Paul vs. Arthur Simeon (Africentric Schools) & Laurie Elliott vs. Nile Seguin (Chick Flicks)	November 28, 2009	410
11	108	"Shakespeare & UFC vs. Boxing"	Steve Patterson	Teresa Pavlinek vs. Raoul Bhaneja (Shakespeare) & Harry Doupe vs. Tim Steeves (UFC vs. Boxing)	December 5, 2009	411
12	109	"Snowmobiles & Anger"	Steve Patterson	Pete Zedlacher vs. Irwin Barker (Snowmobiles) & Darren Frost vs. Rebecca Kohler (Anger)	December 12, 2009	412
13	110	"Recycling & Pie vs. Cake"	Steve Patterson	Glen Foster vs. Deborah Kimmet (Recycling) & Sean Cullen vs. Dave Hemstad (Pie vs. Cake)	January 16, 2010	413
14	111	"Older Men with Younger Women & The End of the World"	Steve Patterson	John Wing vs. Teresa Pavlinek (Older Men with Younger Women) & J.P. Mass vs. Barry Kennedy (The End of the World)	January 23, 2010	414
15	112	"Gym Class & Time Machines"	Steve Patterson	Kristeen von Hagen vs. Debra DiGiovanni (Gym Class) & John Ki vs. Mark Forward (Time Machines)	January 30, 2010	415
16	113	"Backcountry & Sweden"	Steve Patterson	Graham Clark vs. Paul Bae (Backcountry) & Morgan Brayton vs. Gary Jones (Sweden)	February 6, 2010	416
17	114	"Vancouver Olympics & Positive Thinking"	Steve Patterson	Peter Kelamis vs. Charlie Demers (Vancouver Olympics) & "It's Good to Know People" (Jason Bryden and David Milchard) vs. Marc Maron (Positive Thinking)	February 13, 2010	417
18	115	"North American Union & Guilt Trips"	Steve Patterson	Ali Rizvi vs. Alan Park (North American Union) & Simon Rakoff vs. Derek Seguin (Guilt Trips)	February 20, 2010	418
19	116	"Aboriginal Olympics & Winter vs. Summer Olympics"	Steve Patterson	Alonzo Bodden vs. Sean Cullen (Winter vs. Summer Olympics) & Don Kelly vs. Charlie Demers (Aboriginal Olympics)	February 27, 2010	419
20	117	"Texting & Airport Screening"	Steve Patterson	Ivan Decker vs. Erica Sigurdson (Texting) & Graham Clark vs. Bill Richardson (Airport Screening)	March 13, 2010	420
21	118	"Cruise Ships & Sushi"	Steve Patterson	Darcy Michael vs. Diana Frances (Cruise Ships) & Tetsuro Shigematsu vs. Ian Boothby (Sushi)	March 27, 2010	421
22	119	"Golf & King Charles"	Steve Patterson	Derek Edwards vs. Dave Hemstad (Golf) & Arthur Simeon vs. Elvira Kurt (King Charles)	April 3, 2010	422
23	120	"Teenage Sons vs. Teenage Daughters & The Auto Industry"	Steve Patterson	"Humble" Howard Glassman vs. Patrick McKenna (Teens) & Harry Doupe vs. Glen "That Canadian Guy" Foster (Auto Industry)	April 10, 2010	423
24	121	"Garage Sales & Medical Checkups"	Steve Patterson	Carrie Gaetz vs. Graham Chittenden (Garage Sales) & Evan Carter vs. Deborah Kimmett (Medical Checkups)	April 24, 2010	424
25	122	"Curling & Aliens"	Steve Patterson	John Wing vs. Derek Seguin (Curling) & Kevin McDonald vs. Elvira Kurt (Aliens)	May 1, 2010	425
26	123	"P.E.I.'s Symbol & Long Distance Relationships"	Steve Patterson	Mark Little vs. Patrick Ledwell (P.E.I.'s Symbol) & Phil Hanley vs. Erica Sigurdson (Long Distance Relationships)	May 8, 2010	426
27	124	"British Cuisine & Hippies"	Steve Patterson	John Moloney vs. Rebecca Kohler (British Cuisine) & Bruce Clark vs. Paul Krassner (Hippies)	May 15, 2010	427
28	125	"Cottages & Singles"	Steve Patterson	Gilson Lubin vs. Derek Edwards (Cottages) & Karen O'Keefe vs. Scott Faulconbridge (Singles)	May 22, 2010	428
29	126	"Google & Italians"	Steve Patterson	Franco Taddeo vs. Tammy Pescatelli (Italians) & Al Rae vs. Ali Rizvi-Badshah (Google)	May 29, 2010	429
30	127	"Arts vs. Science & Cats vs. Dogs"	Steve Patterson	Dylan Mandlsohn vs. Ryan Belleville (Arts vs. Science) & Debra DiGiovanni vs. Nikki Payne (Cats vs. Dogs)	June 5, 2010	430
31	128	"Tattoos & Dictatorships"	Steve Patterson	Aaron Berg vs. Charlie Demers (Tattoos) & Ron Vaudry vs. Don Kelly (Dictatorships)	June 12, 2010	431
32	129	"Darth Vader & Stay at Home Dads"	Steve Patterson	David Pryde vs. Greg Morton (Darth Vader) & Tim Nutt vs. Dave Hemstad (Stay at Home Dads)	June 19, 2010	432
33	130	"Gender Success & Rural Immigration"	Steve Patterson	Al Rae vs. Maureen Langan (Gender Success) & Pardis Parker vs. Arthur Simeon (Rural Immigration)	August 7, 2010	433

== Season 5 (2010-11) ==
This is a list of episodes from season five of The Debaters on CBC Radio. The full season was released to iTunes on July 16, 2011. All season five episodes were hosted by Steve Patterson.

No. in season	No. in series	Title	Debaters	Original air date	Production code
1	131	"G8 & The Moon Landing"	Derek Seguin vs. Alan Park (G8) & Matt Billon vs. Albert Howell (Moon Landing)	July 3, 2010	501
2	132	"Big Oil & Hollywood"	Pete Johansson vs. Dave Hemstad (Big Oil) & Andrew Maxwell vs. Michael Mittermeier (Hollywood)	September 11, 2010	502
3	133	"Home Schooling & Animal Rights"	Allyson Smith vs. Al Rae (Home Schooling) & Jeff McEnery vs. Tyler Morrison (Animal Rights)	September 18, 2010	503
4	134	"Everything is Better in 3D & Zombies vs. Vampires"	Graham Clark vs. Ron Sparks (3D Movies) & Kristeen von Hagen vs. Pete Zedlacher (Zombies vs. Vampires)	September 25, 2010	504
5	135	"Scrabble vs. Monopoly & Drinking"	Simon Rakoff vs. Rebecca Kohler (Scrabble vs. Monopoly) & Mike Wilmot vs. Glenn Wool (Drinking)	October 2, 2010	505
6	136	"Moustaches & Stand-up Comedy is Dead"	DeAnne Smith vs. Mark Little (Moustaches) & Andy Kindler vs. Harland Williams (Stand-up is Dead)	October 9, 2010	506
7	137	"True Yukon & Gold"	"Jim from Dawson" (Al Macleod) vs. Anthony Trombetta (True Yukon) & Charlie Demers vs. Graham Clark (Gold)	October 16, 2010	507
8	138	"Survival & Diaries"	Barry Kennedy vs. Graham Clark (Survival) & Jane Stanton vs. Darcy Michael (Diaries)	November 6, 2010	508
9	139	"Math & Fanaticism"	Ivan Decker vs. Erica Sigurdson (Math) & Dave Shumka vs. Simon King (Fanaticism)	November 13, 2010	509
10	140	"Musicals & Obama or Oprah?"	Sean Cullen vs. Scott Thompson (Musicals) & Kenny Robinson vs. Dana Alexander (Obama vs. Oprah)	November 20, 2010	510
11	141	"Women Irrational & Handshake"	Nikki Payne vs. Simon Rakoff (Women Irrational) & Ron Josol vs. Darrin Rose (Handshake)	December 4, 2011	511
12	142	"Roommates & Civil Disobedience"	Rob Pue vs. Sam Easton (Roommates) & Alan Park vs. Dave Hemstad (Civil Disobedience)	December 11, 2011	512
13	143	"Shower vs. Bath & Books vs. Movies"	Dave Hemstad vs. Debra DiGiovanni (Shower vs. Bath) & Al Rae vs. John Beuhler (Movies vs. Books)	December 18, 2011	513
14	144	"Credit Cards & Smokers"	Paul Bae vs. Sean Masterston (Credit Cards) & Mike Wilmot vs. Rebecca Kohler	January 22, 2011	514
15	145	"Walt Disney & Tax Motorists"	Jeffery Yu vs. Glen Foster (Tax Motorists) & Sean Cullen vs. Elvira Kurt (Walt Disney)	January 29, 2011	515
16	146	"Bears vs. Sharks & Drug Companies"	Peter Kelamis vs. Mark Little (Bears vs. Sharks) & Alan Park vs. Paul Bae (Drug Companies)	February 5, 2011	516
17	147	"Golden Years & Batman vs. Spiderman"	John Wing vs. Nathan Macintosh (Golden Years) & Baber Siddiqui (Manoj Sood) vs. Reverend William Thorne (Brandon Firla) (Batman vs. Spiderman)	February 19, 2011	517
18	148	"GPS & Pride Parades"	Patrick McKenna vs. Dave Hemstad (GPS) & Elvira Kurt vs. Trevor Boris (Pride Parades)	February 26, 2011	518
19	149	"Government Secrets & Common Law"	Dylan Rhymer vs. David Pryde (Government Secrets) & Derek Seguin vs. Erica Sigurdson (Common Law)	March 5, 2011	519
20	150	"Child to Work Day & Manners"	Big Daddy Tazz vs. Scott Faulconbridge (Child to Work Day) & Adam Growe vs. Rebecca Kohler (Manners)	March 12, 2011	520
21	151	"Urban Chickens & Hitchhiking"	Simon Rakoff vs. Trevor Boris (Urban Chickens) & Rob Pue vs. Jon Steinberg (Hitchhiking)	March 19, 2011	521
22	152	"Anthems & Poetry"	Paul Myrehaug vs. Pete Zedlacher (Anthems) & Patrick Ledwell vs. John Wing (Poetry)	April 2, 2011	522
23	153	"French vs. English & Hugh Hefner"	Derek Seguin vs. Charlie Demers (French vs. English) & Deborah Kimmett vs. Morgan Brayton (Hugh Hefner)	April 9, 2011	523
24	154	"Scientology & Bald is Beautiful"	Paul Bae vs. Erica Sigurdson (Scientology) & Dave Hemstad vs. Scott Faulconbridge (Bald is Beautiful)	April 16, 2011	524
25	155	"Fast Food & Successful Women"	Ron Sparks vs. Alan Park (Fast Food) & Arlene Dickinson vs. John Wing (Successful Women)	April 23, 2011	525
26	156	"Fur & Weddings are a Waste of Money"	Scott Thompson vs. Elvira Kurt (Weddings are a Waste) & Don Kelly vs. Graham Clark (Fur)	April 30, 2011	526
27	157	"Social Networks & Extinct Animals"	Elvira Kurt vs. Charlie Demers (Social Networks) & Sean Cullen vs. David Pryde (Extinct Animals)	May 7, 2011	527
28	158	"Breaking Up & Rome vs. America"	Phil Hanley vs. Laurie Elliott (Breaking Up) & Don Kelly vs. Rick Green (Empires)	May 14, 2011	528
29	159	"Old Rockers & Revenge"	Pete Zedlacher vs. Glen Foster (Old Rockers) & Nikki Payne vs. Dave Hemstad (Revenge)	May 21, 2011	529
30	160	"Lower Expectations & Rise of China"	Roman Danylo vs. Ellie Harvie (Lower Expectations) & Charlie Demers vs. Jeffery Yu (Rise of China)	June 4, 2011	530
31	161	"Tea vs. Coffee & Fewer Channels"	Derek Edwards vs. Nathan Macintosh (TV Channels) & Sean Cullen vs. Pete Johannson (Coffee vs. Tea)	June 25, 2011	531
32	162	"Cirque du Soleil & DIY"	David Pryde vs. Andrew Younghusband (DIY) & Derek Seguin vs. Rebecca Kohler (Cirque du Soleil)	July 2, 2011	532
33	163	"Walmart & Beauty vs. Brains"	Darcy Michael vs. Alan Park (Walmart) & Jon Steinberg vs. Darren Frost (Beauty vs. Brains)	July 9, 2011	533
34	164	"Cheating & Soccer"	Pete Johansson vs. Charlie Demers (Cheating) & Harry Doupe vs. Tim Steeves (Soccer)	July 16, 2011	534

== Season 6 (2011-12) ==
This is a list of episodes from season six of The Debaters on CBC Radio. The full season was released to iTunes on July 10, 2012. All season six episodes were hosted by Steve Patterson.

No. in season	No. in series	Title	Debaters	Original air date	Production code
1	165	"Driving Age & Newfoundland Cuisine"	John Sheehan vs. Nathan Macintosh (Driving Age) & Bill MacIntosh vs. Pete "Snook" Soucy (Newfoundland Cuisine)	September 10, 2011	601
2	166	"Digital Cameras & Master Debater"	Trent McClellan vs. Erica Sigurdson (Digital Cameras) & Derek Seguin vs. Sean Cullen (Master Debater)	September 17, 2011	602
3	167	"Canada vs. Australia & Showbiz Crazy"	Tom Gleeson vs. Joey Elias (Canada vs. Australia) & Maria Bamford vs. Debra DiGiovanni (Showbiz Crazy)	September 24, 2011	603
4	168	"Too Much News & Haggling"	Andy Kindler vs. Marc Maron (Too Much News) & Scott Faulconbridge vs. Hannibal Burress (Haggling)	October 1, 2011	604
5	169	"Bachelor Parties & Comic Book Movies"	Tammy Pescatelli vs. Darrin Rose (Bachelor Parties) & David Pryde vs. Pat Thornton (Comic Book Movies)	October 5, 2011	605
6	170	"Marxism & Video Stores"	Charlie Demers vs. Al Rae (Marxism) & Graham Clark vs. Erica Sigurdson (Video Stores)	October 22, 2011	606
7	171	"Ogopogo vs. Sasquatch & All Men are Projects"	Tim Nutt vs. Roman Danylo (Ogopogo vs. Sasquatch) & Rebecca Kohler vs. Ivan Decker (Project Men)	October 29, 2011	607
8	172	"News vs. Sports & Suzuki vs. Cherry"	Rebecca Kohler vs. Dave Hemstad (News vs. Sports) & Charlie Demers vs. Sean Cullen (David Suzuki vs. Don Cherry)	November 2, 2011	608
9	173	"Seal Hunt & Playing Hard to Get"	Jonny Harris vs. Mark Critch (Seal Hunt) & Derek Seguin vs. Nikki Payne (Playing Hard to Get)	November 19, 2011	609
10	174	"Beer vs. Wine & Kids on the Internet"	Charlie Demers vs. Paul Myrehaug (Beer vs. Wine) & Darcy Michael vs. Jeffery Yu (Kids Online)	November 26, 2011	610
11	175	"The Debaters Christmas Show (Christmas Trees & Christmas Music)"	Darcy Michael vs. Damonde Tschritter (Christmas Trees) & Sean Cullen vs. Jonny Harris (Christmas Music)	December 10, 2011	611
12	176	"Fairy Tales & Toronto Bashing"	Dylan Mandlsohn vs. Nikki Payne (Fairy Tales) & Tim Steeves vs. Derek Seguin (Toronto Bashing)	December 17, 2011	612
13	177	"Waffles vs. Pancakes & Lotteries"	Sean Cullen vs. Dave Hemstad (Waffles vs. Pancakes) & Dave Merheje vs. Simon Rakoff (Lotteries)	January 14, 2012	613
14	178	"Clothes Make the Man & Older Men"	Paul F. Tompkins vs. Dave Shumka (Clothes Make the Man) & Sam Easton vs. Lori Gibbs (Older Men)	January 21, 2012	614
15	179	"Handwriting & Only Children"	Debra DiGiovanni vs. Trevor Boris (Handwriting) & Elvira Kurt vs. Ryan Belleville (Only Children)	January 28, 2012	615
16	180	"Robots vs. Apes & Wait Staff"	Sean Cullen vs. Dan Redican (Robots vs. Apes) & Laurie Elliott vs. Terry McGurrin (Wait Staff)	February 4, 2012	616
17	181	"War of 1812 & Gay Best Friend"	Darryl Lenox vs. Don Kelly (War of 1812) & Darcy Michael vs. Debra DiGiovanni (Gay Best Friends)	February 18, 2012	617
18	182	"Home Ownership & Menopause"	Charlie Demers vs. Paul Bae (Home Ownership) & John Wing vs. Deb Kimmet (Menopause)	February 25, 2012	618
19	183	"Order of Canada & Muppets"	Al Rae vs. Patrick Ledwell (Order of Canada) & David Pryde vs. Jon Steinberg (Muppets)	March 3, 2012	619
20	184	"Taxes & Mystery in Relationships"	Charlie Demers vs. Glen Foster (Taxes) & Mike Wilmot vs. Kate Davis (Mystery in Relationships)	March 10, 2012	620
21	185	"Act Your Age & Mad Men"	Nathan Macintosh vs. Dave Hemstad (Act Your Age) & Nile Seguin vs. Derek Seguin (Mad Men)	March 24, 2012	621
22	186	"Libraries & Energy Drinks"	Ron Sparks vs. Alan Park (Libraries) & Jon Steinberg vs. Rebecca Kohler (Energy Drinks)	March 31, 2012	622
23	187	"One NHL Team & All Inclusive"	Paul Myrehaug vs. Derek Seguin (One NHL Team) & Erica Sigurdson vs. Trent McClellan (All Inclusive)	April 7, 2012	623
24	188	"Rodeos & Kids at Home"	Graham Clark vs. Neil Grahn (Rodeos) & Lori Gibbs vs. Brian Stollery (Kids at Home)	April 21, 2012	624
25	189	"Accents & Alberta's Oil or Celebs?"	Howie Miller vs. Charlie Demers (Accents) & Ryan Belleville vs. Sean Lecomber (Oil vs. Celebs)	April 28, 2012	625
26	190	"Diamonds & Museums"	Fraser Young vs. Jen Grant (Diamonds) & John Wing vs. Derek Seguin (Museums)	May 5, 2012	626
27	191	"Young Moms vs. Old Moms & Is Theatre Relevant?"	Elvira Kurt vs. Judy Gold (Young Moms vs. Old Moms) & Pat Kelly vs. Peter Oldring (Is Theatre Relevant?)	May 12, 2012	627
28	192	"Purebreds & Polite Canadians"	Scott Thompson (as Queen Elizabeth) vs. Sean Cullen (as Adele) & Matt Kirshen vs. Charlie Demers (Polite Canadians)	May 19, 2012	628
29	193	"Farmers' Markets & Star Trek vs. Star Wars"	Darcy Michael vs. Terry McGurrin (Farmers' Markets) & Patrick Maliha vs. Evany Rosen (Star Trek vs. Star Wars)	May 26, 2012	629
30	194	"First Nations Culture & Metric"	Don Kelly vs. Bruce Clark (First Nations) & Jon Steinberg vs. John Wing (Metric)	June 16, 2012	630
31	195	"Handmade & Hugs"	Graham Clark vs. Cory Mack (Handmade) & Lori Gibbs vs. David Pryde (Hugs)	June 23, 2012	631
32	196	"BBQ vs. Picnic & Canadian Flag"	Patrick McKenna vs. Graham Chittenden (BBQ vs. Picnic) & Pete Zedlacher vs. Rebecca Kohler (Canadian Flag)	June 30, 2012	632
33	197	"Oldest vs. Youngest Child & Boring Saskatchewan"	Kelly Taylor vs. Howard Glassman (Oldest vs. Youngest Child) & Dean Jenkinson vs. James O'Shea (Boring Saskatchewan)	July 7, 2012	633

== Season 7 (2012-13) ==
This is a list of the 33 episodes from season seven of The Debaters on CBC Radio. The full season was released to iTunes on July 29, 2013. All season seven episodes were hosted by Steve Patterson.

No. in season	No. in series	Title	Debaters	Original air date	Production code
1	198	"Storage & Hamilton in GTA"	Jon Steinberg vs. Dan Redican (Storage) & Kyle Radke vs. Peter Anthony (Hamilton)	September 8, 2012	701
2	199	"PC vs. Mac & Diefenbaker vs. Douglas"	Ivan Decker vs. Toby Hargrave (PC vs. Mac) & Al Rae vs. Charles Demers (Diefenbaker vs. Douglas)	September 15, 2012	702
3	200	"Gossip & Muslims in Canada"	Debra DiGiovanni vs. Dave Hemstad (Gossip) & Eman El Husseini vs. Ali Hassan (Muslims in Canada)	September 22, 2012	603
4	201	"Early to Bed & Baseball vs. Cricket"	Mike Wilmot vs. Nikki Glaser (Early to Bed) & Sam Simmons vs. John Wing (Baseball vs. Cricket)	September 29, 2012	704
5	202	"Vegas & Nerds vs. Jocks"	Andy Kindler vs. James Adomian (Vegas) & Nathan Macintosh vs. Scott Faulconbridge (Nerds vs. Jocks)	October 6, 2012	705
6	203	"Jaws & Men in Charge"	Sean Cullen vs. Mark Little (Jaws) & Iliza Shlesinger vs. Mo Mandel (Men in Charge)	October 13, 2012	706
7	204	"Over Parenting & Ghosts"	Elvira Kurt vs. Francois Weber (Over Parenting) & Jonny Harris vs. Jon Steinberg (Ghosts)	October 27, 2012	707
8	205	"Plagiarism & Burton Cummings"	Jeff Rothpan vs. Rebecca Kohler (Plagiarism) & Dean Jenkinson vs. Al Rae (Burton Cummings)	November 3, 2012	708
9	206	"The Old Testament & Ancestry"	K. Trevor Wilson vs. Simon Rakoff (The Old Testament) & Charlie Demers vs. Patrick Ledwell (Ancestry)	November 10, 2012	709
10	207	"East vs. West Coast & Gender Communications"	Charlie Demers vs. Patrick Ledwell (East vs. West Coast) & Derek Edwards vs. Kristeen von Hagen (Gender Communication)	November 24, 2012	710
11	208	"Mars & Surprise Parties"	Ron Sparks vs. Sean Cullen (Mars) & Naomi Snieckus vs. Pat Thornton (Surprise Parties)	December 1, 2012	711
12	209	"Nicknames & Parents' Money"	Pete Zedlacher vs. Scott Faulconbridge (Nicknames) & Christina Walkinshaw vs. Kristeen von Hagen (Parents' Money)	December 15, 2012	712
13	210	"Chocolate & Men Dancing"	Nile Seguin vs. Arthur Simeon (Chocolate) & David Pryde vs. Ward Anderson (Men Dancing)	January 12, 2013	713
14	211	"Smartphones & Pet Clothing"	Darcy Michael vs. Ivan Decker (Smartphones) & Graham Clark vs. Michelle Shaughnessy (Pet Clothing)	January 19, 2013	714
15	212	"Bagpipes & Ethnic P.M."	Derek Seguin vs. Johnny 'Bagpipes' Johnston (Bagpipes) & Sunee Dhaliwal vs. Paul Bae (Ethnic P.M.)	January 26, 2013	715
16	213	"Boredom & Women in Hip Hop"	Jon Steinberg vs. Terry McGurrin (Boredom) & Evany Rosen vs. Dave Merheje (Women in Hip Hop)	February 2, 2013	716
17	214	"Ignorance is Bliss & Civilization's Peak"	DeAnne Smith vs. Dave Hemstad (Ignorance) & Darren Frost vs. Darrin Rose (Peak of Civilization)	February 16, 2013	717
18	215	"Puns & Love at First Sight"	Gary Jones vs. Charlie Demers (Puns) & Erica Sigurdson vs. Julie Kim (Love at First Sight)	February 23, 2013	718
19	216	"Jet Fighters & Trust Your Gut"	Ali Hassan vs. Alan Park (Jets) & Rebecca Kohler vs. Graham Chittenden (Trust Your Gut)	March 2, 2013	719
20	217	"Debates are Irrelevant & Living in Residence"	Scott Faulconbridge vs. Jon Steinberg (Debate Irrelevant) & Ali Hassan vs. Evany Rosen (Residence)	March 9, 2013	720
21	218	"Disposable Products & Men and Women Can't Just be Friends"	Alan Park vs. Graham Chittenden (Disposable Products) & Mark Little vs. Christina Walkinshaw (Men and Women Can't Just be Friends)	March 23, 2013	721
22	219	"Free University & Hobbits"	Patrick Ledwell vs. Derek Seguin (Free University) & Ron Sparks vs. David Pryde (Hobbits)	March 30, 2013	722
23	220	"Gateway Pipeline & Dr. Seuss"	Trent McClellan vs. Alan Park (Pipeline) & Dean Jenkinson vs. Ian Boothby (Dr. Seuss)	April 6, 2013	723
24	221	"Wedding Proposals & Basketball"	Charlie Demers vs. Erica Sigurdson (Proposals) & Graham Clark vs. Sunee Dhaliwal (Basketball)	April 20, 2013	724
25	222	"Bikes vs. Cars & Buskers"	Ivan Decker vs. Sean Proudlove (Bikes vs. Cars) & Kristeen von Hagen vs. Wes Borg (Buskers)	April 27, 2013	725
26	223	"CGI & Downton Abbey"	John Wing vs. Ivan Decker (CGI) & Al Rae vs. Deb Kimmett (Downton Abbey)	May 4, 2013	726
27	224	"No Bad Kids & James Bond"	Derek Seguin vs. Michael Gelbart (No Bad Kids) & Sean Cullen vs. Kate Davis (James Bond)	May 12, 2013	727
28	225	"Online Dating & Climate Change"	Trent McClellan vs. Kathleen McGee (Online Dating) & Charlie Demers vs. Mark Forward (Climate Change)	May 18, 2013	728
29	226	"Government Pot & Leftovers"	Darren Frost vs. Dave Martin (Government Pot) & Pat Thornton vs. Elvira Kurt (Leftovers)	May 25, 2013	729
30	227	"Family Vacations & Fireworks"	David Pryde vs. Scott Faulconbridge (Family Vacations) & Patrick McKenna vs. Diane Francis (Fireworks)	June 29, 2013	730
31	228	"Flight vs. Fight & Traditional Medicine"	Erica Sigurdson vs. David Pryde (Fight or Flight) & Darcy Michael vs. K. Trevor Wilson (Traditional Medicine)	July 13, 2013	731
32	229	"Spelling & Sexy Canucks"	John Wing vs. Dave Merheje (Spelling) & Debra DiGiovanni vs. Jonny Harris (Sexy Canucks)	July 20, 2013	732
33	230	"Honesty & Pets"	Terry McGurrin vs. Simon Rakoff (Honesty) & Nikki Payne vs. Ted Morris (Pets)	July 27, 2013	733

== Season 8 (2013-14) ==
This is a list of episodes from season eight of The Debaters on CBC Radio. The full season was released on iTunes on September 10, 2014. All season eight episodes were hosted by Steve Patterson. This season also includes four "extended play" debates - longer edits of previously aired debates including more of the content that had been cut out previously.

No. in season	No. in series	Title	Debaters	Original air date	Production code
1	231	"Unions & Insects"	Dave Hemstad vs. Don Kelly (Unions) & Ron Sparks vs. Arthur Simeon (Insects)	August 31, 2013	801
2	232	"2nd Language & Parking"	Simon Cotter vs. Rebecca Kohler (Parking) & Martha Chaves vs. Glen Foster (2nd Language)	September 7, 2013	802
3	233	"Innovation & Parents/Kids as Friends"	Dave Hemstad vs. Mark DeBonis (Innovation) & Kate Davis vs. Amanda Brooke Perrin (Parents/Kids)	September 28, 2013	803
4	234	"Classic Rock & Oktoberfest"	Graham Chittenden vs. Pete Zedlacher (Classic Rock) & Derek Seguin vs. Kristeen von Hagen (Oktoberfest)	October 12, 2013	804
5	235	"Personal Brands & Cowtown"	Andy Kindler vs. Charlie Demers (Branding) & Allyson Smith vs. Trent McClellan (Cowtown)	October 19, 2013	805
6	236	"Pirates vs. Cowboys & Can Exes be Friends?"	Ron Sparks vs. Trent McClellan (Pirates vs. Cowboys) & Lori Gibbs vs. Ryan Belleville (Exes)	October 26, 2013	806
7	237	"Meat & RV's"	Derek Edwards vs. Graham Clark (Meat) & Cory Mack vs. Brian Stollery (RVs)	November 2, 2013	807
8	238	"Punctuality & Retirement"	Ron Sparks vs. Nathan Macintosh (Punctuality) & Cathy Jones vs. Ali Hassan (Retirement)	November 16, 2013	808
9	239	"Romance Needs Work & Baby Names"	Scott Faulconbridge vs. Laurie Elliott (Romance) & Patrick Ledwell vs. Brian Aylward (Baby Names)	November 23, 2013	809
10	240	"World Class Halifax & Dreams"	Mark Farrell vs. Evany Rosen (Halifax) & Sean Cullen vs. Graham Chittenden (Dreams)	November 30, 2013	810
11	241	"Quebec Charter of Values & Money the Root of All Evil"	Al Rae vs. Eman El-Husseini (Charter of Values) & Scott Faulconbridge vs. Dave Hemstad (Money is Evil)	December 7, 2013	811
12	242	"Clowns vs. Magicians & Dating Better Looking People"	David Acer vs. Pat Thornton (Clowns vs. Magicians) & Amanda Brooke Perrin vs. Rob Pue (Dating)	December 14, 2013	812
13	243	"Reality vs. Scripted TV & Cavemen"	Alan Park vs. Trevor Boris (Reality TV) & Chuck Byrn vs. Chris Locke (Cavemen)	January 18, 2014	813
14	244	"Time Travel & Soulmates"	Evany Rosen vs. Rodney Ramsey (Time Travel) & Derek Seguin vs. Erica Sigurdson (Soulmates)	January 25, 2014	814
15	245	"Small Talk & Internet Anonymity"	Jonny Harris vs. Mark DeBonis (Small Talk) & Nile Seguin vs. Elvira Kurt (Anonymity)	TBA	815
16	246	"Rain vs. Snow & Going to the Gym"	David Pryde vs. Ron Sparks (Rain vs. Snow) & Aaron Berg vs. Jean Paul (Gyms)	March 1, 2014	816
17	247	"The Senate & Living with Kids in Old Age"	Alan Park vs. Charlie Demers (The Senate) & Deb Kimmett vs. Kate Davis (Old Age)	March 8, 2014	817
18	248	"Apples vs. Oranges & Ban Perfume"	Jon Steinberg vs. David Pryde (Apples vs. Oranges) & Christina Walkinshaw vs. Peter Anthony (Perfume)	March 15, 2014	818
19	249	"Books vs. E-Books & Bribery"	Diana Frances vs. Patrick Ledwell (E-Books) & Franco Taddeo vs. Derek Seguin (Bribery)	March 22, 2014	819
20	250	"Hot vs. Cold Cereal & Too Many Nations"	DeAnne Smith vs. Patrick Thornton (Cereals) & Al Rae vs. Don Kelly (Nations)	March 29, 2014	820
21	251	"Are Kids Smarter Today? & The Bomb"	Scott Faulconbridge vs. Nathan Macintosh (Smarter Kids) & Terry McGurrin vs. K. Trevor Wilson (A-Bombs)	April 5, 2014	821
22	252	"Urban Wildlife & Bike Lanes"	Ivan Decker vs. Erica Sigurdson (Urban Wildlife) & Peter Kelamis vs. Toby Hargrave (Bike Lanes)	May 3, 2014	822
23	253	"Heels vs. Flats & Kids Keep Us Young"	Debra DiGiovanni vs. Julie Kim (Heels vs. Flats) & John Wing vs. Howie Miller (Kids Keep Us Young)	May 10, 2014	823
24	254	"Hockey Fighting & Picky Eaters"	Graham Clark vs. Dan Quinn (Hockey Fights) & Rebecca Kohler vs. Charlie Demers (Picky Eaters)	May 17, 2014	824
25	255	"Farming & Folk Music"	Big Daddy Taz vs. Phil Hanley (Farming) & John Wing vs. Dean Jenkinson (Folk Music)	May 24, 2014	825
26	256	"Team Sports & Psychic Powers"	Dave Hemstad vs. Ted Morris (Team Sports) & Jen Grant vs. Rebecca Kohler (Psychic Powers)	June 7, 2014	826
27	257	"Spy vs. Astronaut & Winnipeg is a Gem"	Ivan Decker vs. DeAnne Smith (Spy vs. Astronaut) & Derek Edwards vs. Bruce Clark (Winnipeg)	June 14, 2014	827
28	258	"Tall vs. Short & Street Smarts vs. Book Smarts"	Sunee Dhaliwal vs. Tanyalee Davis (Tall vs. Short) & Evany Rosen vs. Jon Steinberg (Street vs. Book Smarts)	June 21, 2014	828
29	259	"Polar Bears vs. Beavers & Awards Shows"	Graham Clark vs. Peter Brown (Polar Bears vs. Beavers) & Ron Sparks vs. Elvira Kurt (Awards Shows)	June 28, 2014	829
30	260	"Billionaires & Divorcees"	Ali Hassan vs. Graham Chittenden (Billionaires) & Christina Walkinshaw vs. Darryl Orr (Divorcees)	July 5, 2014	830
31	261	"William Shatner & Breakups"	Sean Cullen vs. Eric Peterson (Shatner) & Rebecca Kohler vs. Phil Hanley (Breakups)	August 30, 2014	831
SP–1	--	"Apples vs. Oranges (extended cut)"	Jon Steinberg vs. David Pryde	February 8, 2014	SP-801
SP–2	--	"Dreams (extended cut)"	Sean Cullen vs. Graham Chittenden	February 15, 2014	SP-802
SP–3	--	"Meat (extended cut)"	Derek Edwards vs. Graham Clark	N/A	SP-803
SP–4	--	"William Shatner (extended cut)"	Sean Cullen vs. Eric Peterson	April 19, 2014	SP-804

== Season 9 (2014-15) ==
This is a list of episodes from season nine of The Debaters on CBC Radio. The full season was released to iTunes on July 21, 2015. All season nine episodes were hosted by Steve Patterson. At the close of season nine, a total of 294 episodes (plus four extended debates) had aired. Season 9 was, to date, the last season to be released as a full, complete season. Starting with season 10, the seasons have been split up into two parts.

No. in season	No. in series	Title	Debaters	Original air date	Production code
1	262	"Postal Service & Pitching Woo"	Graham Clark vs. Charlie Demers (Postal Service) & Ivan Decker vs. Kathleen McGee (Pitching Woo)	September 6, 2014	901
2	263	"Cutting CBC & Separate Beds"	Glenn Foster vs. Pat McKenna (Cutting CBC) & Rob Pue vs. Kristeen von Hagen (Separate Beds)	September 13, 2014	902
3	264	"Fishing & Motorcycles"	Trent McClellan vs. Howie Miller (Fishing) & Ivan Decker vs. Herb Dixon (Motorcycles)	September 20, 2014	903
4	265	"House vs. Condo & Food Trucks"	Peter Anthony vs. Faulconbridge (House vs. Condo) & Ron Sparks vs. James Cunningham (Food Trucks)	September 27, 2014	904
5	266	"Zombies vs. Aliens & Proms"	Jon Steinberg vs. Mike Wilmot (Zombies vs. Aliens) & Dave Hemstad vs. Deb Kimmett (Proms)	October 11, 2014	905
6	267	"Don't Worry be Happy & B&Bs"	Derek Seguin vs. Charlie Demers (Don't Worry be Happy) & Lori Gibbs vs. Tim Nutt (B&Bs)	October 18, 2014	906
7	268	"B.C. Ferry vs. Bridge & Is Canada More Like the U.S. or U.K.?"	Ivan Decker vs. Todd Butler (Ferry vs. Bridge) & Dana Alexander vs. Charlie Demers (US vs. UK)	October 25, 2014	907
8	269	"Gardening & Syrup vs. Oil"	Sean Lecomber vs. Laurie Gibbs (Gardening) & Derek Seguin vs. Graham Clark (Oil vs. Syrup)	November 8, 2014	908
9	270	"Winning vs. Losing & Selfies"	Erica Sigurdson vs. Derek Seguin (Winning vs. Losing) & Bruce Clark vs. Peter Oldring (Selfies)	November 15, 2014	909
10	271	"Justin Bieber & Scientists"	Gavin Stephens vs. Rebecca Kohler (Justin Bieber) & Ron Sparks vs. Pete Zedlacher (Scientists)	November 22, 2014	910
11	272	"Dragons vs. Unicorns & Neighbours"	DeAnne Smith vs. Mark Forward (Dragons vs. Unicorns) & Scott Faulconbridge vs. Patrick Ledwell (Neighbours)	December 6, 2014	911
12	273	"Legos & Re-Gifting"	Ivan Decker vs. Howie Miller (Legos) & Erica Sigurdson vs. Julie Kim (Re-Gifting)	December 20, 2014	912
13	274	"Limericks vs. Haikus & Practical Jokes"	Evany Rosen vs. David Pryde (Limerick vs. Haiku) & Darryl Orr vs. Mark Little (Practical Jokes)	January 17, 2015	913
14	275	"The Beatles are Overrated & Marriage is Bad"	Nathan Macintosh vs. Dean Jenkinson (The Beatles) & Dave Hemstad vs. Kate Davis (Marriage is Bad)	January 24, 2015	914
15	276	"Wayne Gretzky & Bearded Men"	Trent McClellan vs. Paul Myrehaug (Wayne Gretzky) & Graham Clark vs. Sean Lecomber (Bearded Men)	January 31, 2014	915
16	277	"Work Sucks & Shouting"	Ali Hassan vs. Jon Steinberg (Work Sucks) & Nikki Payne vs. Simon Rakoff (Shouting)	February 7, 2015	916
17	278	"Salt vs. Sugar & Curly Hair"	Ryan Belleville vs. Sean Cullen (Salt vs. Sugar) & Nile Seguin vs. Aisha Alfa (Curly Hair)	February 21, 2015	917
18	279	"Toddlers vs. Teens & Calgary as Capital"	John Wing vs. Kelly Taylor (Toddlers vs. Teens) & Peter Brown vs. Al Rae (Calgary as Capital)	February 28, 2015	918
19	280	"Old Action Stars & The Best Audience Ever"	Jen Grant vs. Don Kelly (Old Action Stars) & Mike Wilmot vs. Terry McGurrin (Best Audience Ever)	March 7, 2015	919
20	281	"Bacon Obsession & Can Men be Feminists?"	David Acer vs. Dave Hemstad (Bacon Obsession) & Derek Seguin vs. DeAnne Smith (Male Feminists)	March 14, 2015	920
21	282	"Are Grandparents a Bad Influence? & Oversharing"	Patrick Ledwell vs. David Pryde (Grandparents) & Evany Rosen vs. Christina Walkinshaw (Oversharing)	March 21, 2015	921
22	283	"English Speakers in Montreal & Pet Fish"	Rebecca Kohler vs. Derek Seguin (English Speakers) & Jon Steinberg vs. Joey Elias (Pet Fish)	April 4, 2015	922
23	284	"16 Year Old Voters & Cat Videos"	Graham Chittenden vs. Chris Locke (16 Year Olds) & Mike Paterson vs. Aisha Alfa (Cat Videos)	April 18, 2015	923
24	285	"Famous Parents & Drones"	Ron Sparks vs. Graham Chittenden (Famous Parents) & Alan Park vs. Pat Thornton (Drones)	April 25, 2015	924
25	286	"Driverless Cars & Vancouver Men"	Ivan Decker vs. Sean Lecomber (Driverless Cars) & Julie Kim vs. Graham Clark (Vancouver Men)	May 2, 2015	925
26	287	"Comic Books are for Kids & Body Hair"	Kyle Bottom vs. Paul Bae (Comic Books are for Kids) & Toby Hargrave vs. Darcy Michael (Body Hair)	May 9, 2015	926
27	288	"Protests & Tarzan vs. King Kong"	Charlie Demers vs. Erica Sigurdson (Protests) & Jackie Kashian vs. Trent McClellan (King Kong)	May 16, 2015	927
28	289	"Watching Golf & Pigeons vs. Crows"	Erica Sigurdson vs. John Wing (Watching Golf) & Ivan Decker vs. Pete Johansson (Pigeons vs. Crows)	May 23, 2015	928
29	290	"Ads on CBC Radio One & Air Travel"	Charlie Demers vs. Al Rae (Ads on CBC Radio) & Danish Anwar vs. Rebecca Kohler (Air Travel)	June 6, 2015	929
30	291	"Kids Clothing & Bingo"	Wes Borg vs. Derek Seguin (Kids Clothing) & Paul Rabliauskas vs. Bruce Clark (Bingo)	June 13, 2015	930
31	292	"Helping Friends Move & Couples Dressed Alike"	D.J. Demers vs. Tim Nutt (Moving) & Chanty Marostica and Amber Daniels vs. Darcy Michael (Couples Dressed Alike)	June 27, 2015	931
32	293	"Bugs vs. Bears & Canoes"	Peter Wildman vs. Pete Zedlacher (Bugs vs. Bears) & Derek Seguin vs. Don Kelly (Canoes)	July 4, 2015	932
33	294	"Roadside Attractions & -40 vs. +40 Celsius"	Howie Miller vs. Sean Lecomber (Roadside Attractions) & Kelly Taylor vs. Dean Jenkinson (-40 vs. +40)	July 11, 2015	933

== Season 10 (2015-16) ==
This is a list of episodes from season ten of The Debaters on CBC Radio. All season ten episodes were hosted by Steve Patterson. At the close of season ten, a total of 327 episodes (plus four extended debates) had aired. Season 10 is the first season broken into two parts by CBC. All subsequent seasons have also been split into two parts.

=== Part I (2015) ===
Part one aired in 2015 (and was released on iTunes December 21, 2015) and consisted of 12 episodes (episodes 1–12).

No. in season	No. in series	Title	Debaters	Original air date	Production code
1	295	"Millennials & Romance Novels"	John Wing vs. Ivan Decker (Millennials) & Graham Clark vs. Lori Gibbs (Romance Novels)	September 12, 2015	TBA
2	296	"Paying Kids for Good Grades & Is Lake Superior the Greatest Lake?"	Patrick McKenna vs. Rebecca Kohler (Paying for Grades) & Pete Zedlacher vs. Tyler Morrison (Lake Superior)	September 19, 2015	TBA
3	297	"Mountains vs. Prairies & Daylight Savings?"	Eric Peterson vs. Neil Grahn (Mountains vs. Prairies) & Jon Steinberg vs. Erica Sigurdson (Daylight Saving Time)	October 10, 2015	TBA
4	298	"Are There Too Many Movie Sequels? & Do First Impressions Matter?"	Dean Jenkinson vs. David Pryde (Movie Sequels) & Darryl Orr vs. Tanyalee Davis (First Impressions)	October 17, 2015	TBA
5	299	"Are Dollar Stores The Best? & Should Couples Take Separate Vacations?"	Jen Grant vs. Ron Sparks (Dollar Stores) & Scott Faulconbridge vs. Laurie Elliott (Separate Vacations)	October 24, 2015	TBA
6	300	"Hallowe'en Costumes & The Citizenship Test"	Darcy Michael vs. Jen Grant (Halloween Costumes) & Danish Anwar vs. Ron Sparks (Citizenship Tests)	October 28, 2015	TBA
7	301	"Forks vs. Spoons & Should We Welcome Engineered Animals?"	Ryan Belleville vs. Derek Edwards (Fork vs. Spoon) & Big Daddy Tazz vs. Shazia Mirza (Engineered Animals)	November 7, 2015	TBA
8	302	"Bad Boys & Saxophones"	Sean Cullen vs. Debra DiGiovanni (Bad Boys) & Darryl Orr vs. Chris Locke (Saxophones)	November 14, 2015	TBA
9	303	"Friendly Newfoundlanders & Cat Calling"	Cathy Jones vs. Jen Grant (Friendly Newfoundlanders) & John Sheehan vs. Matt Wright (Cat Calling)	November 21, 2015	TBA
10	304	"Movie Remakes & Bird Watching"	Jon Steinberg vs. David Pryde (Movie Remakes) & Pete Soucy (as Snook) vs. Brian Aylward (Birdwatching)	December 5, 2015	TBA
11	305	"Invisibility vs. Flight & Not a Real Debate"	Sean Cullen vs. DeAnne Smith (Invisibility vs. Flight) & Ron Sparks vs. Mark Farrell (This is Not a Real Debate)	December 12, 2015	TBA
12	306	"Soup vs. Salad & Having Servants"	Laurie Elliott vs. Derek Seguin (Soup vs. Salad) & Ali Hassan vs. David Pryde (Servants)	December 19, 2015	TBA

=== Part II (2016) ===
Part two of season ten aired in 2016 (released on iTunes July 23, 2016) and consisted of 21 episodes (episodes 13–33).

No. in season	No. in series	Title	Debaters	Original air date	Production code
13	307	"Yoga & Political Correctness"	Darcy Michael vs. DeAnne Smith (Yoga) & Charlie Demers vs. Derek Seguin (Political Correctness)	January 16, 2016	TBA
14	308	"Laundry vs. Groceries & B.C. Environmentalism"	Glen Foster vs. Wes Borg (Laundry vs. Groceries) & Ivan Decker vs. Erica Sigurdson (Environmentalism)	January 23, 2016	TBA
15	309	"Competitive Kids & Video Games"	Dave Hemstad vs. Katie-Ellen Humphries (Talented Kids) & Kyle Bottom vs. Ivan Decker (Video Games)	January 30, 2016	TBA
16	310	"Vancouver: Live or Visit? & Cash Bars at Weddings"	Peter Brown vs. Charlie Demers (Movie Sequels) & Paul Bae vs. Julie Kim (Cash Bars at Weddings)	February 6, 2016	TBA
17	311	"Backseat Drivers & Phone Books"	Erica Sigurdson vs. Derek Seguin (Backseat Drivers) & Tim Nutt vs. Graham Clark (Phone Books)	February 20, 2016	TBA
18	312	"Gravity & Binge Watching"	Scott Faulconbridge vs. David Acer (Gravity) & Kristeen von Hagen vs. Graham Chittenden (Binge Watching)	February 27, 2016	TBA
19	313	"Pizza & Plain People on TV"	Paul Myrehaug vs. Graham Clark (Pizza) & Sean Lecomber vs. Rebecca Kohler (Plain Looking People in TV and Films)	March 5, 2016	TBA
20	314	"Cats Are Smarter Than Dogs & Messy People"	Derek Seguin vs. Derek Edwards (Cats Smarter Than Dogs) & Elvira Kurt vs. Ryan Belleville (Messy People)	March 12, 2016	TBA
21	315	"Is Toronto the True Capital & Public Displays of Affection"	Peter Anthony vs. Jon Steinberg (Toronto as Capital) & Laurie Elliott vs. Peter Wildman (PDAs)	March 26, 2016	TBA
22	316	"Is Superman the Greatest? & Buttons vs. Zippers"	Ian Boothby vs. Ivan Decker (Superman) & Katie-Ellen Humphries vs. Graham Clark (Buttons vs. Zippers)	April 2, 2016	TBA
23	317	"Everyone Should Sing & Text vs. Phone"	Fred Penner vs. Ron Sparks (Everyone Should Sing) & Amanda Brooke Perrin vs. Patrick Ledwell (Text vs. Phone)	April 16, 2016	TBA
24	318	"Taxi vs. Uber & UK vs. US Spelling"	Sunee Dhaliwal vs. Sean Proudlove (Taxi vs. Uber) & Charlie Demers vs. John Wing (UK vs. US Spelling)	April 23, 2016	TBA
25	319	"Good Looking PM & Carry On vs Checked Luggage"	Evany Rosen vs. Arthur Simeon (Good Looking PM) & David Pryde vs. Pete Zedlacher (Carry On vs Checked Luggage)	April 30, 2016	TBA
26	320	"Can People Change? & Pencils vs. Pens"	Lara Rae vs. Bruce Clark (Can People Change?) & Andy Kindler vs. DeAnne Smith (Pencils vs. Pens)	May 6, 2016	TBA
27	321	"Craft Beer & Fitting In"	Kyle Bottom vs. Mike Delamont (Craft Beer) & Jon Steinberg vs. Lori Gibbs (Fitting In)	May 14, 2016	TBA
28	322	"Men Raising Babies & Dinosaurs"	Faisal Butt vs. Dave Hemstad (Men Raising Babies) & Pat Thornton vs. DeAnne Smith (Dinosaurs)	May 7, 2016	TBA
29	323	"The Man Bun & Friends vs. Family"	Sean Cullen vs. Simon King (The Man Bun) & Dave Merheje vs. Sean Lecomber (Friends vs. Family)	June 4, 2016	TBA
30	324	"Remaining Childless & ESL"	Phil Hanley vs. Big Daddy Tazz (Remaining Childless) & Martha Chaves vs. Derek Seguin (ESL)	June 11, 2016	TBA
31	325	"Anniversaries & TV Theme Songs"	Erica Sigurdson vs. Pete Johanson (Anniversaries) & Graham Clark vs. Dean Jenkinson (TV Theme Songs)	June 18, 2016	TBA
32	326	"Summer Jobs & Nothing Beats the Fair"	Jon Steinberg vs. Kate Davis (Teenagers Should Get Summer Jobs) & Sean Cullen vs. Matt O'Brien (Nothing Beats the Fair)	January 1, 1	TBA
33	327	"Lakes vs. Rivers & Mixed Marriages"	Pat Thornton vs. John Wing (Lakes vs. Rivers) & Jess Salomon vs. Darryl Lenox (Mixed Marriages)	July 9, 2016	TBA

== Season 11 (2016-17) ==
This is a list of episodes from season eleven of The Debaters on CBC Radio. All season ten episodes were hosted by Steve Patterson. At the close of season ten, a total of 360 episodes (plus four extended debates) had aired. Season 11 was split into two parts, 12 episodes in 2016, and 21 episodes in 2017.

=== Part I (2016) ===
Part one of season eleven aired in 2016 (released on iTunes December 24, 2016) and consisted of 12 episodes.

No. in season	No. in series	Title	Debaters	Original air date	Production code
1	328	"Hot Dogs vs. Hamburgers & Northern Tourists"	Howie Miller vs. Derek Seguin (Hotdogs vs. Hamburgers) & Jenny Hamilton vs. Anthony Trombetta (Northern Tourists)	September 9, 2016	TBA
2	329	"Commonplace Names & Classic Toys"	Kyle Bottom vs. Mayce Galoni (Commonplace Names) & Greg Morton vs. Nikki Payne (Classic Toys)	September 17, 2016	TBA
3	330	"Rejection Is Good & Potlucks Suck"	Dave Hemstad vs. David Pryde (Rejection Is Good) & Laurie Elliott vs. Arthur Simeon (Potlucks Suck)	September 24, 2016	TBA
4	331	"White Men & Chicken or Egg"	Don Kelly vs. Glen Foster (White Men) & Ryan Belleville vs. Denis Grignon (Chicken vs. Egg)	September 30, 2016	TBA
5	332	"Comfort vs. Style & Vinyl"	Ivan Decker vs. Katie-Ellen Humphries (Comfort vs. Style) & Graham Clark vs. Sean Lecomber (Vinyl)	TBA	TBA
6	333	"Bragging & Day vs. Night"	Darcy Michael vs. Charlie Demers (Bragging) & Kyle Bottom vs. Erica Sigurdson (Day vs. Night)	October 22, 2016	TBA
7	334	"Superstition & Eavesdropping"	DeAnne Smith vs. Arthur Simeon (Superstition) & Jon Steinberg vs. DJ Demers (Eavesdropping)	October 28, 2016	TBA
8	335	"Fall vs. Spring & The 90s"	Sean Cullen vs. David Pryde () & Ron Sparks vs. Rebecca Kohler (The 90s)	November 10, 2016	TBA
9	336	"Job Interviews & Beauty"	Dave Hemstad vs. Nour Hadidi (Job Interviews) & Derek Edwards vs. Peter Anthony (Beauty)	December 17, 2016	TBA
10	337	"Indoors vs. Outdoors & Delete Facebook"	Don Kelly vs. Dean Jenkinson (Indoors vs. Outdoors) & Paul Myrehaug vs. Kathleen McGee (Delete Facebook)	November 25, 2016	TBA
11	338	"Share Our Water & NHL in Vegas"	Lara Rae vs. Charlie Demers (Share Our Water) & Damonde Tschritter vs. Trent Mclellan (NHL in Vegas)	December 9, 2016	TBA
12	339	"Board Games & Office Holiday Parties"	Tim Steeves vs. Mayce Galoni (Board Games) & Laurie Elliott vs. Scott Faulconbridge (Office Holiday Parties)	December 16, 2016	TBA

=== Part II (2017) ===
Part two of season eleven aired in 2017 (released on iTunes July 20, 2017) and consisted of 21 episodes.

No. in season	No. in series	Title	Debaters	Original air date	Production code
13	340	"Ambition & Online Reviews"	Kyle Bottom vs. John Wing (Ambition) & Erica Sigurdson vs. Derek Seguin (Online Reviews)	January 14, 2017	TBA
14	341	"Pub Crawl vs. Wine Tour & Cashless Society"	vs. () & vs. ()	January 23, 2016	TBA
15	342	"Drive-Thrus & Hot Tubs"	vs. () & vs. ()	January 23, 2016	TBA
16	343	"Hunters vs. Gatherers & University"	vs. () & vs. ()	January 23, 2016	TBA
17	344	"Microwaves & Multitasking"	vs. () & vs. ()	January 23, 2016	TBA
18	345	"Kingston Penitentiary & Second-Generation Canadians"	vs. () & vs. ()	January 23, 2016	TBA
19	346	"Skating & The Five-Second Rule"	vs. () & vs. ()	January 23, 2016	TBA
20	347	"Mittens vs. Gloves & Government Jobs"	vs. () & vs. ()	January 23, 2016	TBA
21	348	"News Anchors & Pet vs. Child"	vs. () & vs. ()	January 23, 2016	TBA
22	349	"Sorry & Living to 150"	vs. () & vs. ()	January 23, 2016	TBA
23	350	"Vocabulary & Heaven vs. Hell"	vs. () & vs. ()	January 23, 2016	TBA
24	351	"Couples Fight & Jeopardy vs. Wheel of Fortune"	vs. () & vs. ()	January 23, 2016	TBA
25	352	"Stealing a Kiss & Virtual Reality"	vs. () & vs. ()	January 23, 2016	TBA
26	353	"Napping & Peanut Butter vs. Jam"	vs. () & vs. ()	January 23, 2016	TBA
27	354	"Wheat & Redheads"	vs. () & vs. ()	January 23, 2016	TBA
28	355	"Fitbits & Hollywood Whitewashing"	vs. () & vs. ()	January 23, 2016	TBA
29	356	"Testosterone & Stand-up Comedy"	vs. () & vs. ()	January 23, 2016	TBA
30	357	"Personal Trainers & Family Dinners"	vs. () & vs. ()	January 23, 2016	TBA
31	358	"Dowries & Emojis"	vs. () & vs. ()	January 23, 2016	TBA
32	359	"Exaggeration & Horoscopes"	Dave Hemstad vs. John Wing (Exaggeration) & Derek Seguin vs. Jackie Kashian (Horoscopes)	August 9, 2017	TBA
33	360	"Screening for Canadian Values & The CN Tower"	Nour Hadidi vs. Arthur Simeon (Screening for Canadian Values) & Ali Hassan vs. Pat Thornton (The CN Tower)	June 30, 2017	TBA

== Season 12 (2017-18) ==
This is a list of episodes from season twelve of The Debaters on CBC Radio. All season 12 episodes were hosted by Steve Patterson. At the close of season 12, a total of 360 episodes (plus four extended debates) had aired. Season 12 was split into two parts, 13 episodes in 2017, and 20 episodes in 2018.

=== Part I (2017) ===
Part one of season twelve aired in 2017 (released on iTunes January 16, 2018) and consisted of 13 episodes.

No. in season	No. in series	Title	Debaters	Original air date	Production code
1	361	"Moose vs. Beaver & Mani-Pedis"	Lorne Cardinal vs. Craig Lauzon (Moose vs. Beaver) & Graham Clark vs. Lori Gibbs (Mani-Pedis)	September 9, 2017	TBA
2	362	"Americans Moving to the Maritimes & Trips to the Dentist"	vs. () & vs. ()	January 23, 2016	TBA
3	363	"Lobster & Cliches"	vs. () & vs. ()	January 23, 2016	TBA
4	364	"Prince George vs. Prince George & Mascots"	vs. () & vs. ()	January 23, 2016	TBA
5	365	"Off-Road vs. On-Road & Introverts vs. Extroverts"	vs. () & vs. ()	January 23, 2016	TBA
6	366	"Fog & Cans vs. Bottles"	vs. () & vs. ()	January 23, 2016	TBA
7	367	"Salespeople & The Fiddle"	vs. () & vs. ()	January 23, 2016	TBA
8	368	"Minimum Wage & The Sun vs. The Moon"	vs. () & vs. ()	January 23, 2016	TBA
9	369	"Nickleback & Question Mark vs. Exclamation Mark"	vs. () & vs. ()	January 23, 2016	TBA
10	370	"Cows vs. Chickens & French Fries"	vs. () & vs. ()	January 23, 2016	TBA
11	371	"Money Can Buy Happiness & Newfoundlanders Leaving Alberta"	vs. () & vs. ()	January 23, 2016	TBA
12	372	"Christmas Cuisine & Peanuts"	Ali Hassan vs. Sean Cullen (Holiday Food) & Graham Clark vs. Jenny Hamilton (Peanuts)	December 18, 2018	TBA
13	373	"No More Grades & New Year's Eve"	John Cullen vs. Derek Seguin (No More Grades) & Ivan Decker vs. Katie-Ellen Humphries (New Year's Eve)	December 26, 2017	TBA

=== Part II (2018) ===
Part two of season twelve aired in 2018 (released on iTunes July 10, 2018) and consisted of 20 episodes.

No. in season	No. in series	Title	Debaters	Original air date	Production code
14	374	"More Parking & High School Sweethearts"	Sean Lecomber vs. Erica Sigurdson (More Parking) & Kathleen McGee vs. Howie Miller (High School Sweethearts)	January 11, 2018	TBA
15	375	"It Ain't Easy Being Big & Small Roles"	vs. () & vs. ()	January 23, 2016	TBA
16	376	"No Dogs Allowed & Never Give Advice"	vs. () & vs. ()	January 23, 2016	TBA
17	377	"Relationship Boss & Whales"	vs. () & vs. ()	January 23, 2016	TBA
18	378	"Nanny vs. Daycare & Stop and Smell the Roses"	vs. () & vs. ()	January 23, 2016	TBA
19	379	"Gender Neutral Awards & Aisle vs. Window"	vs. () & vs. ()	January 23, 2016	TBA
20	380	"No More Grey Hair & Sneakers"	vs. () & vs. ()	January 23, 2016	TBA
21	381	"Heavy Metal & Writing Memoirs"	vs. () & vs. ()	January 23, 2016	TBA
22	382	"The End Is Near & Sports Interviews"	vs. () & vs. ()	January 23, 2016	TBA
23	383	"Brunch & We Don't Exist"	vs. () & vs. ()	January 23, 2016	TBA
24	384	"Punching Up & Raccoon Mayor"	vs. () & vs. ()	January 23, 2016	TBA
25	385	"No More Royals & Abbreviations"	vs. () & vs. ()	January 23, 2016	TBA
26	386	"Every Comic Needs a Gimmick & Should They Marry?"	Simon King vs. Ivan Decker (Comic Gimmicks) & Tim Gray vs. Dana Smith (Should We Marry?)	May 5, 2018	TBA
27	387	"Women Tougher Than Men & Chess vs. Checkers"	vs. () & vs. ()	January 23, 2016	TBA
28	388	"Talking About the Weather & Crowdfunding"	vs. () & vs. ()	January 23, 2016	TBA
29	389	"Robot Lovers & Statues"	vs. () & vs. ()	January 23, 2016	TBA
30	390	"Parades & Realtors"	vs. () & vs. ()	January 23, 2016	TBA
31	391	"Food Courts & Nails vs. Screws"	vs. () & vs. ()	January 23, 2016	TBA
32	392	"Indigenous Place Names & Bees vs. Butterflies"	vs. () & vs. ()	January 23, 2016	TBA
33	393	"Ketchup vs. Mustard & Children of Divorce"	Wes Borg vs. Sean Proudlove (Ketchup vs. Mustard) & Fatima Dhowre vs. Sophie Buddle (Children of Divorce)	June 29, 2018	TBA

== Season 13 (2018-19) ==
This is a list of episodes from season thirteen of The Debaters on CBC Radio. All season 13 episodes were hosted by Steve Patterson. Season 13 was split into two parts, 11 episodes in 2018, and 22 episodes in 2019.

=== Part I (2018) ===
Part one of season thirteen aired in 2018 (released on iTunes December 18, 2018) and consisted of 11 episodes.

No. in season	No. in series	Title	Debaters	Original air date	Production code
1	394	"Fire vs. Wheel & House Party vs. Bush Party"	Don Kelly vs. Derek Seguin (Fire vs. Wheel) & Kathleen McGee vs. Alex Sparling (House Party vs. Bush Party)	September 14, 2018	TBA
2	395	"E-Sports & Victoria Capital"	vs. () & vs. ()	January 23, 2016	TBA
3	396	"Birds as Pets & Love Songs Suck"	vs. () & vs. ()	January 23, 2016	TBA
4	397	"Antiques Roadshow & Aquafit"	vs. () & vs. ()	January 23, 2016	TBA
5	398	"Northern Lights & The Dump"	vs. () & vs. ()	January 23, 2016	TBA
6	399	"Yellowknife Bucket List & Wild Meat"	Karen O’Keefe vs. Derek Seguin (Yellowknife Bucket List) & vs. ()	January 23, 2016	TBA
7	400	"The Birds and the Bees & Red Wine vs. White Wine"	vs. () & vs. ()	January 23, 2016	TBA
8	401	"Buy Canadian & TV Reboots"	vs. () & vs. ()	January 23, 2016	TBA
9	402	"Dairy & 60s Music vs. 80s Music"	Katie-Ellen Humphries vs. Big Daddy Tazz (Dairy) & John Wing vs. Dean Jenkinson (60s vs. 80s Music)	December 1, 2018	TBA
10	403	"Repair vs. Replace & Small Towns"	Charlie Demers vs. Lara Rae (Repair vs. Replace) & Paul Rabliauskas vs. Erica Sigurdson (Small Towns)	December 7, 2018	TBA
11	404	"The Earth Is Flat & Saskatoon Tourist Destination"	Ivan Decker vs. Sean Lecomber (Earth Is Flat) & Cory Mack vs. Kelly Taylor (Saskatoon Tourist Destination)	December 14, 2018	TBA

=== Part II (2019) ===
Part two of season 13 aired in 2019 (released on iTunes June 26, 2019) and consisted of 22 episodes.

No. in season	No. in series	Title	Debaters	Original air date	Production code
12	405	"Niagara Falls & First Dates"	Ron Sparks vs. Sean Cullen (Niagara Falls) & Kate Davis vs. Graham Clark (First Dates)	January 11, 2019	TBA
13	406	"Canceling Plans & AirBNB"	Jacob Samuel vs. Wes Borg (Canceling Plans) & Abdul Butt vs. Erica Sigurdson (AirBNB)	January 19, 2019	TBA
14	407	"Fad Diets & In-Laws"	Sean Proudlove vs. Steph Tolev (Fad Diets) & Gavin Clarkson vs. Sterling Scott (In-Laws)	January 26, 2019	TBA
15	408	"Don't Try Marijuana & Go Viral"	Lara Rae vs. Dave Hemstad (Don't Try Marijuana) & Fatima Dhowre vs. Graham Clark (Go Viral)	February 2, 2019	TBA
16	409	"Flowers as Gifts & Internet vs. Doctor"	Katie-Ellen Humphries vs. Tim Nutt (Flowers as Gifts) & Julie Kim vs. Mayce Galoni (Internet vs. Doctor)	February 9, 2019	TBA
17	410	"Toronto vs. Vancouver & Travel with Parents"	Sean Cullen vs. Charlie Demers (Toronto vs. Vancouver) & Jane Stanton vs. Sophie Buddle (Travel with Parents)	February 16, 2019	TBA
18	411	"Movie Trailers & Japan"	Howie Miller vs. Simon King (Movie Trailers) & Kyle Bottom vs. Yumi Nagashima (Japan)	February 23, 2019	TBA
19	412	"Trudeau vs. Trudeau & Sharing Food"	Glen Foster vs. Elvira Kurt (Trudeau vs. Trudeau) & Ali Hassan vs. Patrick Ledwell (Sharing Food)	March 2, 2019	TBA
20	413	"Snowball Fights & 60 Is the New 40"	Derek Edwards vs. Dave Hemstad (Snowball Fights) & Deborah Kimmett vs. Mike Wilmot (60 is the New 40)	March 16, 2019	TBA
21	414	"Poutine & Jury Duty"	Laurie Elliott vs. Derek Seguin (Poutine) & David Pryde vs. Ron Sparks (Jury Duty)	March 23, 2019	TBA
22	415	"Ottawa Nightlife & Never Take Back an Ex"	Don Kelly vs. Jen Grant (Ottawa Nightlife) & Arthur Simeon vs. Adrienne Fish (Never Take Back an Ex)	March 30, 2019	TBA
23	416	"Toronto Maple Leafs & Don't Let Yourself Go"	Hunter Collins vs. Ryan Belleville (Maple Leafs) & Carol Zoccoli vs. Dave Hemstad (Let Yourself Go)	January 23, 2019	TBA
24	417	"Easter & Second Place"	Lara Rae vs. Derek Seguin (Easter) & Jon Steinberg vs. Bruce Clark (Second Place)	April 20, 2019	TBA
25	418	"Opinion on Everything & Horror Movies"	Peter Anthony vs. Aisha Brown (Opinion on Everything) & Allyson Smith vs. Don Kelly (Horror Movies)	April 27, 2019	TBA
26	419	"Table vs. Booth & Stupid Questions"	Laurie Elliott vs. Graham Chittenden (Table vs. Booth) & Courtney Gilmour vs. Chris Locke (Stupid Questions)	May 4, 2019	TBA
27	420	"Hockey Parents & Travelling to USA"	Kelly Taylor vs. Sean Lecomber (Hockey Parents) & Martha Chaves vs. Rob Bebenek (Travelling to USA)	May 11, 2019	TBA
28	421	"Political Parties & Gum vs. Mints"	Simon Rakoff vs. Jon Steinberg (Political Parties) & Pat Thornton vs. Elvira Kurt (Gum vs. Mints)	May 18, 2019	1328
29	422	"Slurpees & Honeymoons"	Graham Clark (comedian)	May 25, 2019	TBA
30	423	"Denim vs. Leather & Stadiums"	Lorne Cardinal vs. DeAnne Smith (Denim vs. Leather) & Dean Jenkinson vs. Trent McClellan (Stadiums)	June 1, 2019	TBA
31	424	"Alberta Should Secede & The Bachelor"	Peter Brown vs. Derek Seguin (Alberta Should Secede) & Nour Hadidi vs. Erica Sigurdson (The Bachelor)	June 8, 2019	TBA
32	425	"Public Art & Blue Collar Jobs Recorded in Calgary, Alberta."	Charlie Demers vs. Lori Gibbs (Public Art) & Brittany Lyseng vs. Sean Lecomber (Blue Collar Jobs)	June 14, 2019	TBA
33	426	"Nature Programs & Public Transit"	Eric Peterson vs. Gavin Crawford (Nature Programs) & Debra DiGiovanni vs. Arthur Simeon (Public Transit)	June 21, 2019	TBA

== Season 14 (2019-20) ==
This is a list of episodes from season 14 of The Debaters on CBC Radio. All season 14 episodes were hosted by Steve Patterson. Season 12 was split into two parts, 13 episodes in 2019, and 20 episodes in 2020.

=== Part I (2019) ===
Part one of season 14 aired in 2019 (released on iTunes December 16, 2019) and consisted of 13 episodes.

No. in season	No. in series	Title	Debaters	Original air date	Production code
1	427	"Oysters & Alexander Graham Bell vs. Alexander Keith"	Lara Rae vs. Katie-Ellen Humphries (Oysters) & Mark Farrell vs. Trent McClellan (Bell vs. Keith)	September 6, 2019	TBA
2	428	"Cashier vs. Self-Checkout & Own a Boat"	Nikki Payne vs. Patrick Ledwell (Cashier vs. Self-Checkout) & Sean Cullen vs. Graham Chittenden (Own a Boat)	September 14, 2019	TBA
3	429	"Visit Cape Breton & Weatherpeople"	Ed Macdonald vs. Patrick Ledwell (Cape Breton) & Jay Malone vs. Matt Wright (Forecasters)	September 28, 2019	TBA
4	430	"Pumpkin & English vs. French Culture"	Laurie Elliott vs. Kyle Brownrigg (Pumpkin) & Derek Seguin vs. James Mullinger (English vs. French Culture)	October 5, 2019	TBA
5	431	"Ghosts & Pie vs. Cake (RE-EDIT/REPEAT)"	Jon Steinberg vs. Jonny Harris (Ghosts) & Sean Cullen vs. Dave Hemstad (Pie vs. Cake)	October 12, 2019	TBA
6	432	"Call Ahead vs. Drop-in & Canada Food Guide"	Nathan Macintosh vs. Tim Steeves (Call Ahead vs. Drop-in) & David Pryde vs. Elvira Kurt (Canada's Food Guide)	October 19, 2019	TBA
7	433	"New Brunswick Is Ugly & Parks"	Peter Anthony vs. James Mullinger (New Brunswick Is Ugly) & Nikki Payne vs. Jon Steinberg (Parks)	November 2, 2019	TBA
8	434	"Fake Meat & Scuba Diving"	Rob Bebenek vs. Dave Hemstad (Fake Meat) & Hunter Collins vs. Elvira Kurt (Scuba Diving)	November 9, 2019	TBA
9	435	"Carbon Tax & City Slogans"	Charlie Demers vs. Glen Foster (Carbon Tax) & Todd Graham vs. Evany Rosen (City Slogans)	November 16, 2019	TBA
10	436	"Plate vs. Bowl & Soap Operas"	Simon Rakoff vs. Sean Cullen (Plate vs. Bowl) & Deborah Kimmett vs. Michelle Shaughnessy (Soap Operas)	November 22, 2019	TBA
11	437	"Correcting Grammar & A Day on the Slopes"	Erica Sigurdson vs. Sterling Scoctt (Correcting Grammar) & Tim Nutt vs. Ryan Williams (A Day on the Slopes)	November 29, 2019	TBA
12	438	"Festivals & Best Friends Forever"	Don Kelly vs. Ali Hassan (Festivals) & Nour Hadidi vs. Courtney Gilmour (Best Friends Forever)	December 6, 2019	TBA
13	439	"Home for the Holidays & Telemarketers"	Lara Rae vs. Rob Pue (Home for the Holidays) & John Hastings vs. Derek Seguin (Telemarketers)	December 17, 2019	TBA

=== Part II (2020) ===
Part two of season 14 aired in 2020 (released on iTunes September 16, 2019) and consisted of 20 episodes.

No. in season	No. in series	Title	Debaters	Original air date	Production code
14	440	"William Shatner (REPEAT)"	Eric Petersen vs. Sean Cullen (William Shatner)	January 10, 2020	TBA
15	441	"Chair vs. Couch & News on Social Media"	vs. () & vs. ()	January 23, 2016	TBA
16	442	"The Rock vs. Hulk Hogan & Study Abroad"	vs. () & vs. ()	January 23, 2016	TBA
17	443	"Take the Train & Kids Change Everything"	vs. () & vs. ()	January 23, 2016	TBA
18	444	"Millenials & Romance Novels"	vs. () & vs. ()	January 23, 2016	TBA
19	445	"Play in a Band & Universal Health Care"	vs. () & vs. ()	January 23, 2016	TBA
20	446	"Raisins & Rom-Coms"	vs. () & vs. ()	January 23, 2016	TBA
21	447	"Spoken Word & Marathons"	vs. () & vs. ()	January 23, 2016	TBA
22	448	"Everyone Should Sing & Text vs. Phone"	vs. () & vs. ()	January 23, 2016	TBA
23	449	"Nickelback & Question Mark vs. Exclamation Mark"	vs. () & vs. ()	January 23, 2016	TBA
24	450	"No More Grey Hair & Sneakers"	vs. () & vs. ()	January 23, 2016	TBA
25	451	"Comfort vs. Style & Vinyl"	vs. () & vs. ()	January 23, 2016	TBA
26	452	"Cricket vs. Baseball & Early to Bed (REPEAT)"	Sam Simmons vs. John Wing (Cricket vs. Baseball) & Mike Wilmot vs. Nikki Glaser (Early to Bed)	April 25, 2020	TBA
27	453	"Write a Memoir & Heavy Metal (REPEAT)"	Arthur Simeon vs. Martha Chaves (Write a Memoir) & Don Kelly vs. Mike Paterson (Heavy Metal)	May 2, 2020	TBA
28	454	"Family Time & Haircuts at Home"	Charlie Demers vs. Derek Seguin (Family Time) & Don Kelly vs. Erica Sigurdson (Haircuts at Home)	May 9, 2020	TBA
29	455	"Rejection & Potlucks (REPEAT)"	Dave Hemstad vs. David Pryde (Rejection) & Laurie Elliott vs. Arthur Simeon (Potlucks)	May 16, 2020	TBA
30	456	"Can People Change & Pencil vs. Pen (REPEAT)"	Lara Rae vs. Bruce Clark (Can People Change) & DeAnne Smith vs. Andy Kindler (Pencil vs. Pen)	May 30, 2020	TBA
31	457	"Working from Home & Baking"	Katie-Ellen Humphries vs. Ivan Decker (Working from Home) & Dean Jenkinson vs. Elvira Kurt (Baking)	June 6, 2020	TBA
32	458	"Moose vs. Beaver & No More Royals"	Lorne Cardinal vs. Craig Lauzon (Moose vs. Beaver) & Graham Clark vs. Lori Gibbs (Mani-Pedis)	June 13, 2020 or June 20?	TBA
33	459	"Social Distance Dating & Drive-Ins"	DeAnne Smith vs. Arthur Simeon (Social Distance Dating) & Sean Cullen vs. Ryan Belleville (Drive-Ins)	June 27, 2020	TBA

== Season 15 (2020-21) ==
This is a list of episodes from season 15 of The Debaters on CBC Radio. All season 15 episodes were hosted by Steve Patterson. Season 15 was split into two parts, with 13 episodes airing in 2020–2021, and 20 episodes later in 2021.

=== Part I (2020-21) ===
Part one of season 15 aired in 2020-21 (released on iTunes February 5, 2021) and consisted of 13 episodes.

No. in season	No. in series	Title	Debaters	Original air date	Production code
1	460	"Best Man vs. Maid of Honour & Basements"	Arthur Simeon vs. Carolyn Taylor (Best Man vs. Maid of Honour) & Jon Steinberg vs. Laurie Elliott (Basement)	September 11, 2020	TBA
2	461	"Home Births & Vancouver Grizzlies"	Chris Locke vs. Julie Kim (Home Births) & Graham Clark vs. John Cullen (Vancouver Grizzlies)	September 18, 2020	TBA
3	462	"Vaping & Honour"	vs. () & vs. ()	January 23, 2016	TBA
4	463	"Casinos & Can't Complain"	vs. () & vs. ()	January 23, 2016	TBA
5	464	"Stop Making Bond & Rescue Animals"	vs. () & vs. ()	January 23, 2016	TBA
6	465	"Leave the Big City & Young Activists"	vs. () & vs. ()	January 23, 2016	TBA
7	466	"Bad Audience & Keep Calm and Carry On"	vs. () & vs. ()	January 23, 2016	TBA
8	467	"E-Learning & NASCAR"	vs. () & vs. ()	January 23, 2016	TBA
9	468	"Turkey vs. Ham & Buy in Bulk"	Ivan Decker vs. Jacob Samuel (Turkey vs. Ham) & Sean Lecomber vs. Andrea Jin (Buy in Bulk)	November 27, 2020	TBA
10	469	"Horses & Public vs. Commercial Radio"	Tim Nutt vs. Sophie Buddle (Horses) & Myles Anderson vs. Simon King (Public vs. Commercial Radio)	December 4, 2020	TBA
11	470	"Snow Days & Wonder Woman vs. Superman"	Julie Kim vs. Kelly Taylor (Wonder Woman vs. Superman) & Lisa Baker vs. Damonde Tschritter (Snow Days)	December 11, 2020	TBA
12	471	"Gift Bags vs. Wrapping Paper & Duets"	Ivan Decker vs. Charlie Demers (Gift Bags vs. Wrap) & Wes Borg vs. Shirley Gnome (Duets)	December 18, 2020	TBA
13	472	"Christmas Cuisine & Peanuts Comics (REPEAT)"	Ali Hassan vs. Sean Cullen (Christmas Cuisine) & Graham Clark vs. Jenny Hamilton (Peanuts Comics)	December 23, 2020	TBA

=== Part II (2021) ===
Part two of season 15 aired in 2021 (released on iTunes December 17, 2021) and consisted of 20 episodes.

No. in season	No. in series	Title	Debaters	Original air date	Production code
14	473	"Skating & Five-Second Rule (REPEAT)"	Ron Sparks vs. Jon Steinberg (Skating) & Ron Josol vs. Steph Tolev (Five-Second Rule)	January 8, 2021	TBA
15	474	"Exercise at Home & Community Theatre"	vs. () & vs. ()	January 23, 2016	TBA
16	475	"Hobbies & Skin Care Routine"	vs. () & vs. ()	January 23, 2016	TBA
17	476	"Listening to Scientists & Whistling"	vs. () & vs. ()	January 23, 2016	TBA
18	477	"Relationship Boss & Whales"	vs. () & vs. ()	January 23, 2016	TBA
19	478	"Vacuum vs. Broom & Handshakes"	vs. () & vs. ()	January 23, 2016	TBA
20	479	"Home Cooked Meals & Truth or Dare"	vs. () & vs. ()	January 23, 2016	TBA
21	480	"Lobster & Cliches"	vs. () & vs. ()	January 23, 2016	TBA
22	481	"Popcorn vs. Chips & Jazz"	vs. () & vs. ()	January 23, 2016	TBA
23	482	"Punching Up vs. Punching Down & Raccoon Mayor"	vs. () & vs. ()	January 23, 2016	TBA
24	483	"Rabbits & Rogers Centre"	vs. () & vs. ()	January 23, 2016	TBA
25	484	"Birthdays Suck & Fasting"	vs. () & vs. ()	January 23, 2016	TBA
26	485	"Personal Voice Assistants & Celebrity Advice"	vs. () & vs. ()	January 23, 2016	TBA
27	486	"Actual Temperature vs. Feels Like & Walks"	vs. () & vs. ()	January 23, 2016	TBA
28	487	"Space Vacations & Love Thy Neighbour"	vs. () & vs. ()	January 23, 2016	TBA
29	488	"Puzzles & Statutory Holidays"	vs. () & vs. ()	January 23, 2016	TBA
30	489	"Family Feud vs. Price Is Right & Investing"	Ali Hassan vs. Derek Seguin (Family Feud vs. Price Is Right) & Nour Hadidi vs. Ron Sparks (Investing)	June 4, 2021	TBA
31	490	"Cup vs. Cone & Pool vs. Trampoline"	Tim Steeves vs. Jon Steinberg (Cup vs. Cone) & Laurie Elliott vs. Hunter Collins (Pool vs. Trampoline)	June 11, 2021	TBA
32	491	"Northern Lights & The Dump (REPEAT)"	Sean Lecomber vs. Yumi Nagashima (Northern Lights) & Don Kelly vs. Kate Davis (The Dump)	June 18, 2021	TBA
33	492	"Replacing vs. Repairing & Small Towns (REPEAT)"	Charlie Demers vs. Lara Rae (Replacing vs. Repairing) & Paul Rabliauskas vs. Erica Sigurdson (Small Towns)	June 25, 2021	TBA

== Season 16 (2021-22) ==
This is a list of episodes from season 16 of The Debaters on CBC Radio. All season 16 episodes were hosted by Steve Patterson. The season was split into two parts, of 12 episodes in 2021, and 21 episodes in 2022. Season sixteen saw the airing of the series' 500th episode. At season's end 525 Debaters episodes had aired.

=== Part I (2021) ===
Part one of season 16 aired in 2021 (released on iTunes December 18, 2021) and consisted of 12 episodes.

No. in season	No. in series	Title	Debaters	Original air date	Production code
1	493	"Family Road Trips & Peaches vs. Cherries"	Lori Gibbs vs. Maddy Kelly (Family Road Trips) & Ivan Decker vs. Tim Nutt (Peaches vs. Cherries)	September 10, 2021	TBA
2	494	"E-Bikes & Wine Appreciation"	vs. () & vs. ()	January 23, 2016	TBA
3	495	"Beef vs. Salmon & Tech Careers"	vs. () & vs. ()	January 23, 2016	TBA
4	496	"Big Family vs. Small Family & Golf Courses"	vs. () & vs. ()	January 23, 2016	TBA
5	497	"Theme Parties & Clean Jokes vs. Dirty Jokes"	vs. () & vs. ()	January 23, 2016	TBA
6	498	"Opinion on Everything & Horror Movies"	vs. () & vs. ()	January 23, 2016	TBA
7	499	"Spicy Food & Disneyland"	vs. () & vs. ()	January 23, 2016	TBA
8	500	"Canadian vs. U.S. Elections & Kids TV"	Ryan Belleville vs. Charlie Demers (Canadian vs. U.S. Elections) & Kristeen von Hagen vs. Chris Locke (Kids TV)	November 12, 2021	TBA
9	501	"Online Comments & Shootouts and Penalty Kicks"	vs. () & vs. ()	January 23, 2016	TBA
10	502	"Competitive Food Shows & Turtleneck vs. V-Neck"	Alan Shane Lewis vs. Mike Delamont (Competitive Food TV) & Sean Cullen vs. Steph Tolev (Turtleneck vs. V-Neck)	November 26, 2021	TBA
11	503	"Movie Musicals & Small Dogs vs. Big Dogs"	Dean Jenkinson vs. Matt Falk (Movie Musicals) & Carole Cunningham vs. Ted Morris (Small Dogs vs. Big Dogs)	December 3, 2021	TBA
12	504	"Home for the Holidays & Telemarketers (REPEAT)"	Lara Rae vs. Rob Pue (Home for the Holidays) & John Hastings vs. Derek Seguin (Telemarketers)	December 17, 2021	TBA

=== Part II (2022) ===
Part two of season 16 aired in 2022 (released on iTunes October 15, 2022) and consisted of 20 episodes.

No. in season	No. in series	Title	Debaters	Original air date	Production code
13	505	"Antiques Roadshow & Aquafit (REPEAT)"	Myles Anderson vs. Ivan Decker (Antiques Roadshow) & Mayce Galoni vs. Deborah Kimmett (Aquafit)	January 7, 2022	TBA
14	506	"Retro Video Games & Express Your Emotions"	vs. () & vs. ()	January 23, 2016	TBA
15	507	"The Middle & Petitions"	vs. () & vs. ()	January 23, 2016	TBA
16	508	"Home Improvement vs. Self-Improvement & Patience"	vs. () & vs. ()	January 23, 2016	TBA
17	509	"Ambition & Online Reviews"	vs. () & vs. ()	January 23, 2016	TBA
18	510	"Canada Goose & Destination Weddings"	Sean Cullen vs. Pete Zedlacher (Destination Weddings) & Paul Myrehaug vs. Allie Pearse (Canada Goose)	February 18, 2022	TBA
19	511	"Stop Feeding Animals & Crushes"	Sean Lecomber vs. Jacob Samuel (Stop Feeding Animals) & Katie-Ellen Humphries vs. Wes Borg (Crushes)	February 25, 2016	TBA
20	512	"Mid-Life Crisis vs. Quarter-Life Crisis & All-Day Breakfast"	Maddy Kelly vs. Charlie Demers (Mid-Life Crisis vs. Quarter-Life Crisis) & Graham Clark vs. Kathleen McGee (All-Day Breakfast)	March 4, 2022	TBA
21	513	"Braces vs. Glasses & Live in a Van"	Erica Sigurdson vs. Ivan Decker (Glasses vs. Braces) & Lachlan Patterson vs. Wes Borg (Live in a Van)	March 11, 2022	TBA
22	514	"Denim vs. Leather & Stadiums"	Lorne Cardinal vs. DeAnne Smith (Denim vs. Leather) & Dean Jenkinson vs. Trent McClellan (Stadiums)	March 18, 2022	TBA
23	515	"Cancel the Oscars & Pick-Up Lines"	Simon King vs. Julie Kim (Cancel the Oscars) & Yumi Nagashima vs. Mayce Galoni (Pick-Up Lines)	March 25, 2022	TBA
24	516	"April Fool's Day & Vancouver Worst Dressed"	Myles Anderson vs. Abdul Aziz (April Fool's Day) & Sophie Buddle vs. Jacob Samuel (Vancouver Worst Dressed)	April 1, 2022	TBA
25	517	"Music vs. Poetry & Family Portraits"	John Wing vs. Dan Mangan (Music vs. Poetry) & Lachlan Patterson vs. Katie-Ellen Humphries (Family Portraits)	April 8, 2022	TBA
26	518	"Word Games & Immigrate to Toronto"	Sean Cullen vs. Graham Chittenden (Word Games) & Nour Hadidi vs. Hisham Kelati (Immigrate to Toronto)	April 22, 2022	TBA
27	519	"Budget Airlines & Lie to Your Kids"	Laurie Elliott vs. Dave Hemstad (Budget Airlines) & Ian Sirota vs. Kate Davis (Lie to Your Kids)	April 29, 2022	TBA
28	520	"Smarties vs. M&Ms & Fate"	Ron Sparks vs. Elvira Kurt (Smarties vs. M&Ms) & Jon Steinberg vs. Ali Hassan (Fate)	May 13, 2022	TBA
29	521	"Bucket Lists & NHL Players Most Attractive"	Deborah Kimmett vs. Simon Rakoff (Bucket Lists) & Hunter Collins vs. Kyle Brownrigg (NHL Players)	May 20, 2022	TBA
30	522	"Unfriendly Manitoba & Boredom"	Bruce Clark vs. Matt Falk (Unfriendly Manitoba) & David Pryde vs. Martha Chaves (Boredom)	May 27, 2022	TBA
31	523	"Lemonade vs. Iced Tea & Winnie the Pooh"	Dean Jenkinson vs. Katie-Ellen Humphries (Lemonade vs. Iced Tea) & Big Daddy Tazz vs. Todd Graham (Winnie the Pooh)	June 10, 2022	TBA
32	524	"Adult Skateboarders & Share Your Culture"	Tim Gray vs. Dana Smith (Adult Skateboarders) & Don Kelly vs. Chad Anderson (Share Your Culture)	June 17, 2022	TBA
--	---	"Adult Skateboarders (Extended Cut)"	Tim Gray vs. Dana Smith	June 16, 2022	1632a
--	---	"Share Your Culture (Extended Cut)"	Tim Gray vs. Dana Smith	June 16, 2022	1632b
33	525	"Zed vs. Zee & Cool Moms"	Lara Rae vs. DeAnne Smith (Zed vs. Zee) & Lori Gibbs vs. Bree Parsons (Cool Moms)	July 1, 2022	TBA

== Season 17 (2022-23) ==
This is a list of episodes from season 17 of The Debaters on CBC Radio. All season 17 episodes were hosted by Steve Patterson. Season 17 was split into two parts, 13 episodes in 2022, and 20 episodes in 2023.

=== Part I (2022) ===
Part one of season 17 aired in 2022 (released on iTunes January 6, 2023) and consisted of 13 episodes.

No. in season	No. in series	Title	Debaters	Original air date	Production code
1	526	"Free Dental Care & Twins"	Deborah Kimmett vs. Charlie Demers (Free Dental Care) & Graham Clark vs. Dylan & Dusty Williamson (Twins)	September 8, 2022	TBA
2	527	"Purses & Cryptocurrency"	Derek Seguin vs. DeAnne Smith (Purses) & John Hastings vs. Joe Vu (Cryptocurrency)	September 16, 2022	TBA
3	528	"Joni Mitchell vs. Bob Dylan & UFOs"	Peter Brown vs. Dean Jenkinson (Joni Mitchell vs. Bob Dylan) & Matt O'Brien vs. Nour Hadidi (UFOs)	September 23, 2022	TBA
4	529	"Cheerleading & Hobby Farms"	Katie-Ellen Humphries vs. Erica Sigurdson (Cheerleaders) & Kathleen McGee vs. Kelly Taylor (Hobby Farms)	September 30, 2022	TBA
5	530	"Corn & Crying"	Ivan Decker vs. Lara Rae (Corn) & Chad Anderson vs. Sean Lecomber (Crying)	October 7, 2022	TBA
6	531	"Open Marriages & Roughriders Fans"	Charlie Demers vs. Kathleen McGee (Open Marriages) & Peter Brown vs. Myles Morrison (Roughriders Fans)	October 14, 2022	TBA
7	532	"Witches vs. Wizards"	Ron Sparks vs. Nikki Payne	October 28, 2022	TBA
8	533	"Call Ahead vs. Drop-In & Canada Food Guide (REPEAT)"	Tim Steeves vs. Nathan Macintosh (Call Ahead vs. Drop-In) & David Pryde vs. Elvira Kurt (Canada Food Guide)	November 4, 2022	TBA
9	534	"Multi-Level Marketing & Beautiful Towns"	Matt Falk vs. Jon Steinberg (Multi-Level Marketing) & Lara Rae vs. Graham Chittenden (Beautiful Towns)	November 12, 2022	TBA
--	---	"Multi-Level Marketing (Extended Cut)"	Matt Falk vs. Jon Steinberg	November 10, 2022	1709a
--	---	"Beautiful Towns (Extended Cut)"	Lara Rae vs. Graham Chittenden	November 10, 2022	1709b
10	535	"Curtains vs. Blinds & The World Cup"	Derek Seguin vs. Dave Hemstad (Curtains vs. Blinds) & Sean Cullen vs. Nour Hadidi (The World Cup)	November 25, 2022	TBA
--	---	"Curtains vs. Blinds (Extended Cut)"	Derek Seguin vs. Dave Hemstad	November 24, 2022	1710a
--	---	"The World Cup (Extended Cut)"	Sean Cullen vs. Nour Hadidi	November 24, 2022	1710b
11	536	"Newfoundland PM & Secrets"	Lisa Baker vs. Hisham Kelati (Newfoundland PM) & Deborah Kimmett vs. Jon Steinberg (Secrets)	December 2, 2022	TBA
--	---	"Newfoundland PM (Extended Cut)"	Lisa Baker vs. Hisham Kelati	December 1, 2022	1711a
--	---	"Secrets (Extended Cut)"	Deborah Kimmett vs. Jon Steinberg	December 1, 2022	1711b
12	537	"Bieber vs. Shakespeare & Internet Dependence"	Courtney Gilmour vs. Rebecca Northan (Bieber vs. Shakespeare) & Abdul Butt vs. Derek Seguin (Internet Dependence)	December 9, 2022	TBA
--	--	"Bieber vs. Shakespeare (Extended Cut)"	Courtney Gilmour vs. Rebecca Northan	December 8, 2022	1712a
--	--	"Internet Dependence (Extended Cut)"	Abdul Butt vs. Derek Seguin	December 8, 2022	1712b
13	538	"Holiday Decorations & Trivia."	David Pryde vs. Elvira Kurt (Holiday Decorations) & Hisham Kelati vs. Courtney Gilmour (Trivia)	December 23, 2022	TBA
--	--	"Holiday Decorations (Extended Cut)"	David Pryde vs. Elvira Kurt	December 22, 2022	1713a
--	--	"Trivia (Extended Cut)"	Hisham Kelati vs. Courtney Gilmour	December 22, 2022	1713b

=== Part II (2023) ===
Part two of season 17 aired in 2023 (released on iTunes July 7, 2023) and consisted of 20 episodes, with 40 extended cut versions of those debates posted on CBC's website.

No. in season	No. in series	Title	Debaters	Original air date	Production code
14	539	"Theatre Actors & Lefties"	Bruce McCulloch vs. Sean Cullen (Theatre Actors) & Elvira Kurt vs. Kaitlin Shuvera (Lefties)	January 13, 2023	TBA
--	--	"Theatre Actors (Extended Cut)"	Bruce McCulloch vs. Sean Cullen	January 12, 2023	1714a
--	--	"Lefties (Extended Cut)"	Elvira Kurt vs. Kaitlin Shuvera	January 12, 2023	1714b
15	540	"Eating Insects & Don't Quit Your Dayjob"	Dave Hemstad vs. Nikki Payne (Eating Insects) & Kate Davis vs. Abbas Wahab (Quit Your Day Job)	January 20, 2023	TBA
--	---	"Eating Insects (Extended Cut)"	Dave Hemstad vs. Nikki Payne	January 19, 2023	1715a
--	---	"Don't Quit Your Dayjob (Extended Cut)"	Kate Davis vs. Abbas Wahab	January 19, 2023	1715b
16	541	"Table vs. Booth & Stupid Questions (REPEAT)"	Laurie Elliott vs. Graham Chittenden (Table vs. Booth) & Courtney Gilmour vs. Chris Locke (Stupid Questions)	January 27, 2023	TBA
--	---	"Table vs. Booth (Extended Cut)"	Laurie Elliott vs. Graham Chittenden	January 26, 2023	1716a
--	---	"Stupid Questions (Extended Cut)"	Courtney Gilmour vs. Chris Locke	January 26, 2023	1716b
17	542	"Hand-Me-Downs Suck & Adventure Tourism"	Patrick Ledwell vs. Rebecca Reeds (Hand-Me-Downs) & Derek Seguin vs. Kyle Brownrigg (Adventure Tourism)	February 2, 2023	TBA
--	--	"Hand-Me-Downs Suck (Extended Cut)"	Patrick Ledwell vs. Rebecca Reeds	February 2, 2023	1717a
--	--	"Adventure Tourism (Extended Cut)"	Kyle Brownrigg vs. Derek Seguin	February 2, 2023	1717b
18	543	"The Caesar & Housing Affordability"	Sean Cullen vs. DeAnne Smith (The Caesar) & Abdul Butt vs. Vishal Ramesh (Housing Affordability)	February 17, 2023	TBA
--	--	"The Caesar (Extended Cut)"	Sean Cullen vs. DeAnne Smith	February 16, 2023	1718a
--	--	"Housing Affordability (Extended Cut)"	Abdul Butt vs. Vishal Ramesh	February 16, 2023	1718b
19	544	"Umbrella vs. Rainjacket & Giving Compliments"	Graham Clark vs. Maddy Kelly (Umbrella vs. Rainjacket) & Charlie Demers vs. Lori Gibbs (Giving Compliments)	February 24, 2023	TBA
--	--	"Umbrella vs. Rainjacket (Extended Cut)"	Graham Clark vs. Maddy Kelly	February 23, 2023	1719a
--	--	"Giving Compliments (Extended Cut)"	Charlie Demers vs. Lori Gibbs	February 23, 2023	1719b
20	545	"Donut vs. Muffin & Seniors Discount"	Ivan Decker vs. Don Kelly (Donut vs. Muffin) & John Wing vs. Deborah Kimmett (Seniors Discount)	March 3, 2016	TBA
--	--	"Donut vs. Muffin (Extended Cut)"	Ivan Decker vs. Don Kelly	March 2, 2023	1720a
--	--	"Seniors Discounts (Extended Cut)"	John Wing vs. Deborah Kimmett	March 2, 2023	1720b
21	546	"Movie Trailers & Japan (REPEAT)"	Howie Miller vs. Simon King (Movie Trailers) & Kyle Bottom vs. Yumi Nagashima (Japan)	March 10, 2023	TBA
--	--	"Movie Trailers (Extended Cut)"	Howie Miller vs. Simon King	March 9, 2023	1721a
--	--	"Japan (Extended Cut)"	Kyle Bottom vs. Yumi Nagashima	March 9, 2023	1721b
22	547	"Live Music & Fine Dining"	Dean Jenkinson vs. David Milchard and Ken Lawson (Live Music) & Wes Borg vs. Julie Kim (Fine Dining)	March 17, 2023	TBA
--	--	"Live Music (Extended Cut)"	Dean Jenkinson vs. David Milchard	March 16, 2023	1722a
--	--	"Fine Dining (Extended Cut)"	Wes Borg vs. Julie Kim	March 16, 2023	1722b
23	548	"Stop Complaining About Construction & Rollercoasters"	Ryan Williams vs. Brittany Lyseng (Construction Complaints) & Marito Lopez vs. Myles Anderson (Rollercoasters)	March 24, 2023	TBA
--	---	"Stop Complaining About Construction (Extended Cut)"	Ryan Williams vs. Brittany Lyseng	March 23, 2023	1723a
--	---	"Roller Coasters (Extended Cut)"	Marito Lopez vs. Myles Anderson	March 23, 2023	1723b
24	549	"Samosas vs. Spring Rolls & Teachers' Strikes"	Ali Hassan vs. Andrew Phung (Samosas vs. Spring Rolls) & Allyson Smith vs. Ron Sparks (Teachers' Strikes)	April 7, 2023	TBA
--	---	"Samosas vs. Spring Rolls (Extended Cut)"	Ali Hassan vs. Andrew Phung	April 6, 2023	1724a
--	--	"Teachers' Strikes (Extended Cut)"	Allyson Smith vs. Ron Sparks	April 6, 2023	1724b
25	550	"Everyone Isn't Unique & Tree Planters vs. Lumberjacks"	Lisa Baker vs. Yumi Nagashima (Everyone Isn’t Unique) & Katie-Ellen Humphries vs. Kevin Banner (Tree Planters vs. Lumberjacks)	April 13, 2023	TBA
--	--	"Everyone Isn't Unique (Extended Cut)"	Lisa Baker vs. Yumi Nagashima	April 13, 2023	1725a
--	--	"Tree Planters vs. Lumberjacks (Extended Cut)"	Katie-Ellen Humphries vs. Kevin Banner	April 13, 2023	1725b
26	551	"Ban Exotic Pets & No More Highways"	Laurie Elliott vs. Nathan Macintosh (Ban Exotic Pets) & Elvira Kurt vs. Jon Steinberg (No More Highways)	April 27, 2023	TBA
--	--	"Ban Exotic Pets (Extended Cut)"	Laurie Elliott vs. Nathan Macintosh	April 27, 2023	1726a
--	--	"No More Highways (Extended Cut)"	Elvira Kurt vs. Jon Steinberg	April 27, 2023	1726b
27	552	"Coronations & Lucky Numbers"	Don Kelly vs. James Mullinger (Coronations) & Leonard Chan vs. Zabrina Douglas (Lucky Numbers)	May 5, 2023	TBA
--	--	"Coronations (Extended Cut)"	Don Kelly vs. James Mullinger	May 4, 2023	1727a
--	--	"Lucky Numbers (Extended Cut)"	Leonard Chan vs. Zabrina Douglas	May 4, 2023	1727b
28	553	"End Nepotism & A Day at the Spa"	Rebecca Northan vs. Arthur Simeon (End Nepotism) & Chris Locke vs. Juliana Rodrigues (Spa Days)	May 18, 2023	TBA
--	--	"End Nepotism (Extended Cut)"	Rebecca Northan vs. Arthur Simeon	May 18, 2023	1728a
--	--	"A Day at the Spa (Extended Cut)"	Chris Locke vs. Juliana Rodrigues	May 18, 2023	1728b
29	554	"Hometown Heroes & Competitiveness"	Matt Falk vs. Pete Zedlacher (Hometown Heroes) & Jenn Labelle vs. Myles Anderson (Competitiveness)	June 1, 2023	TBA
--	--	"Hometown Heroes (Extended Cut)"	Matt Falk vs. Pete Zedlacher	June 1, 2023	1729a
--	--	"Competitiveness (Extended Cut)"	Jenn Labelle vs. Myles Anderson	June 1, 2023	1729b
30	555	"Glue vs. Tape & No More Exams"	Arthur Simeon vs. Derek Seguin (Glue vs. Tape) & Ashwyn Singh vs. Lisa Baker (No More Exams)	June 8, 2023	TBA
--	--	"Glue vs. Tape (Extended Cut)"	Arthur Simeon vs. Derek Seguin	June 8, 2023	1730a
--	--	"No More Exams (Extended Cut)"	Ashwyn Singh vs. Lisa Baker	June 8, 2023	1730b
31	556	"Dad Jokes & Shopping Malls"	Big Daddy Tazz vs. Maddy Kelly (Dad Jokes) & Graham Clark vs. Don Kelly (Shopping Malls)	June 15, 2023	TBA
--	--	"Dad Jokes (Extended Cut)"	Big Daddy Tazz vs. Maddy Kelly	June 15, 2023	1731a
--	--	"Shopping Malls (Extended Cut)"	Graham Clark vs. Don Kelly	June 15, 2023	1731b
32	557	"Barbie Comeback & Talk About Money"	Yumi Nagashima vs. Lara Rae (Barbie Comeback) & Jacob Samuel vs. Martha Chaves (Talk About Money)	June 23, 2023	TBA
--	--	"Barbie Comeback (Extended Cut)"	Yumi Nagashima vs. Lara Rae	June 22, 2023	1732a
--	--	"Talk About Money (Extended Cut)"	Jacob Samuel vs. Martha Chaves	June 22, 2023	1732b
33	558	"Pretzels vs. Peanuts & Fake Plants"	Eric Peterson vs. Lorne Cardinal (Pretzels vs. Peanuts) & Courtney Gilmour vs. Kate Davis (Fake Plants)	June 30, 2023	TBA
--	--	"Pretzels vs. Peanuts (Extended Cut)"	Eric Peterson vs. Lorne Cardinal	June 29, 2023	1733a
--	--	"Fake Plants (Extended Cut)"	Courtney Gilmour vs. Kate Davis	June 29, 2023	1733b

== Season 18 (2023-24) ==
This is a list of episodes from season 18 of The Debaters on CBC Radio. All season 18 episodes were hosted by Steve Patterson. Season 18 was split into two parts, 13 episodes in 2023, and 20 episodes in 2024.

=== Part I (2023) ===
Part one of season 18 aired in 2023 (released on iTunes TBC) and consisted of 13 episodes.

No. in season	No. in series	Title	Debaters	Original air date	Production code
1	559	"Big Weddings vs. Small Weddings & Back-to-School"	Patrick Ledwell vs. Nour Hadidi (Big Weddings vs. Small Weddings) & Nikki Payne vs. Derek Seguin (Back-to-School)	September 7, 2023	TBA
2	560	"McDonald’s & Football"	Mayce Galoni vs. Erica Sigurdson (McDonald's) & Rob Pue vs. Ryan Williams (Football)	September 14, 2023	TBA
3	561	"Lighthouse Keepers & Local Newspapers"	Sean Cullen vs. Jon Steinberg (Lighthouse Keepers) & James Mullinger vs. Heidi Brander (Local Newspapers)	September 21, 2023	TBA
4	562	"Living with Grandparents & Graphic Novels"	Myles Anderson vs. Clifton Cremo (Living with Grandparents) & Simon Rakoff vs. Deborah Kimmett (Graphic Novels)	September 28, 2023	TBA
5	563	"Hosting a Holiday Meal & Sad Country Music"	Erica Sigurdson vs. Sean Lecomber (Hosting a Holiday Meal) & Simon King vs. Shirley Gnome (Sad Country Music)	October 5, 2023	TBA
6	564	"Fruit Picking & Electricians vs. Plumbers"	Nikki Payne vs. Peter Anthony (Fruit Picking) & Shane Ogden vs. Chad Anderson (Electricians vs. Plumbers)	October 13, 2023	TBA
7	565	"Non-Alcoholic Drinks & Fear of Clowns"	Brittany Lyseng vs. Kelly Taylor (Non-Alcoholic Drinks) & Graham Clark (comedian)	October 27, 2023	TBA
8	566	"The Kilt & Deep Sea vs. Outer Space"	Lara Rae vs. Patrick Ledwell (Kilts) & Arthur Simeon vs. Peter White (Deep Sea vs. Outer Space)	November 2, 2023	TBA
9	567	"Expiry Dates & Leave Fossils in the Ground"	Charlie Demers vs. Charles Haycock (Expiry Dates) & Kathleen McGee vs. Gavin Clarkson (Fossils)	November 9, 2023	TBA
10	568	"Nature Programs & Public Transit (REPEAT)"	Eric Peterson vs. Gavin Crawford (Nature Programs) & Debra DiGiovanni vs. Arthur Simeon (Public Transit)	November 16, 2023	TBA
11	569	"Rats & The Cowboy Hat"	Katie-Ellen Humphries vs. Aaron Read (Rats) & Dakota Ray Hebert vs. Peter Brown (The Cowboy Hat)	November 29, 2023	TBA
12	570	"Pork vs Chicken & Home vs Away"	Lisa Baker vs. Malik Elassal (Pork vs Chicken) & John Cullen vs. Sunee Dhaliwal (Home vs Away)	December 6, 2023	TBA
13	571	"Secret Santa & Parliament Hill"	Jen Grant vs. Hisham Kelati (Secret Santa) & Arthur Simeon vs. Don Kelly (Parliament Hill)	December 13, 2023	TBA

=== Part II (2024) ===
Part two of season 18 aired in 2024 (released on iTunes TBC) and consisted of 20 episodes.

No. in season	No. in series	Title	Debaters	Original air date	Production code
14	572	"High-speed Rail & Favourite Child"	Ron Sparks vs. Leonard Chan (High-speed Rail) & Hoodo Hersi vs. Deborah Kimmett (Favourite Child)	January 3, 2024	TBA
15	573	"Coins vs Bills & Anxiety is Your Friend"	DeAnne Smith vs. David Pryde (Coins vs Bills) & Tracy Hamilton vs. Kyle Brownrigg (Anxiety is Your Friend)	January 11, 2024	TBA
16	574	"Correcting Grammar & A Day on the Slopes"	Erica Sigurdson vs.Sterling Scott (Correcting Grammar) & Tim Nutt vs. Ryan Williams (A Day on the Slopes)	January 18, 2024	TBA
17	575	"Artificial Intelligence & Themed Accommodation"	Courtney Gilmour vs. Hunter Collins (Artificial Intelligence) & Laurie Elliott vs.Kristeen von Hagen (Themed Accommodation)	February 1, 2024	TBA
18	576	"A Good Night's Sleep & Sandwiches vs. Wraps"	Ivan Decker vs. Jon Steinberg (A Good Night's Sleep) & Jan Caruana vs. Graham Chittenden (Sandwiches vs Wraps)	February 15, 2024	TBA
19	577	"Hiking vs. Gondola & Don't Break Up with Friends"	Gavin Clarkson vs. Abdul Aziz (Hiking vs. Gondola) & Maddy Kelly vs. Yumi Nagashima (Don't Break Up with Friends)	February 22, 2024	TBA
20	578	"Feared vs. Loved & Dress Up Your Pets"	Lisa Baker vs. Lara Rae (Feared vs. Loved) & Kathleen McGee vs. Sean Devlin (Dress Up Your Pets)	February 29, 2024	TBA
21	579	"Step-Parents & Talking to Strangers"	Jon Dore vs. Charlie Demers (Step-Parents) & Ivan Decker vs. Julie Kim (Talking to Strangers)	March 7, 2024	TBA
22	580	"Vancouver No Fun City & Be Yourself"	Graham Clark vs. Katie-Ellen Humphries (Vancouver No Fun City) & Mikey Dubs vs. Simon King (Be Yourself)	March 14, 2024	TBA
23	581	"Piano vs. Guitar & Brand Names"	Myles Anderson vs. Jacob Samuel (Piano vs. Guitar) & Sean Lecomber vs. Robby Hoffman (Brand Names)	March 28, 2024	TBA
24	582	"Cashier vs. Self-Checkout & Own a Boat"	Nikki Payne vs. Patrick Ledwell (Cashier vs. Self-Checkout) & Sean Cullen vs. Graham Chittenden (Own a Boat)	April 4, 2024	TBA
25	583	"Movies are Too Long & Pickleball"	Greg Morton vs. Kyle Brownrigg (Movies are Too Long) & Deborah Kimmett vs. Ali Hassan (Pickleball)	April 11, 2024	TBA
26	584	"Spending vs. Saving & Taylor Swift Fans"	Dave Hemstad vs. Jon Steinberg (Spending vs. Saving) & Nour Hadidi vs. Don Kelly (Taylor Swift Fans)	April 18, 2024	TBA
27	585	"Law and Order & Learn a New Language"	Kate Davis vs. Sean Cullen (Law and Order) & Hunter Collins vs. Marito Lopez (Learn a New Language)	April 25, 2024	TBA
28	586	"After-School Jobs & Cousins"	Joe Pillitteri vs. Courtney Gilmour (After-School Jobs) & Arthur Simeon vs. Jackie Pirico (Cousins)	May 9, 2024	TBA
29	587	"Belts vs. Suspenders & Move to Hamilton"	Elvira Kurt vs. Graham Chittenden (Belts vs. Suspenders) & Gavin Stephens vs. Ron Sparks (Move to Hamilton)	May 16, 2024	TBA
30	588	"Generation X & Angels vs. Ghosts"	Derek Seguin vs. Chad Anderson (Generation X) & Hisham Kelati vs. Kathleen McGee (Angels vs. Ghosts)	May 23, 2024	TBA
31	589	"Never Too Late to Get Divorced & Convenience Stores"	Bruce Clark vs. Claire Belford (Never Too Late to Get Divorced) & Graham Clark vs. Julie Kim (Convenience Stores)	June 6, 2024	TBA
32	590	"Day at the Beach & Mosquitoes"	Deborah Kimmett vs. Myles Anderson (Day at the Beach) & Pete Zedlacher vs. Rob Bebenek (Mosquitoes)	June 13, 2024	TBA
33	591	"Maple Syrup vs. Honey & Sleepovers"	Charlie Demers vs. Derek Seguin (Maple Syrup vs. Honey) & Henry Sir vs. Erica Sigurdson (Sleepovers)	June 20, 2024	TBA

== Season 19 (2024-25) ==
This is a list of episodes from season 19 of The Debaters on CBC Radio. All season 19 episodes were hosted by Steve Patterson.

=== Part I (2024) ===
Part one of season 19 aired in 2024 and consisted of 13 episodes.

No. in season	No. in series	Title	Debaters	Original air date	Production code
1	592	"Coke vs. Pepsi & Family Doctors"	Dave Hemstad vs. Lisa Baker (Coke vs. Pepsi) & Clifton Cremo vs. Martha Chaves (Family Doctors)	September 5, 2024	TBA
2	593	"Altlantic Ocean vs. Pacific Ocean & Growing Up Poor"	Matt Wright vs. Charlie Demers (Altlantic Ocean vs. Pacific Ocean) & Bree Parsons vs. Nikki Payne (Growing Up Poor)	September 12, 2024	TBA
3	594	"Audiobooks vs. Books & The Ballet"	Matt Falke vs. Lara Rae (Audiobooks vs. Books) & DeAnne Smith vs. Courtney Gilmour (The Ballet)	September 19, 2024	TBA
4	595	"Staycations & Partner with More Success"	Patrick Ledwell vs. John Sheehan (Staycations) & Chris Wilson vs. Stacey McGunnigle (Partner with More Success )	September 26, 2024	TBA
5	596	"Kids on Socia Media & Stripes vs. Polka Dots"	Myles Anderson vs. Sean Lecomber (Kids on Socia Media) & Rob Pue vs. Kathleen McGee (Stripes vs. Polka Dots)	October 3, 2024	TBA
6	597	"Boston Pizza & Long Weekends"	Ivan Decker vs. Maddy Kelly (Boston Pizza) & Abdul Aziz vs. John Hastings (Long Weekends)	October 10, 2024	TBA
7	598	"Butter vs. Margarine & Newfoundland Time Zone"	Derek Seguin vs. Matt Wright (Butter vs. Margarine) & Nour Hadidi vs. Hisham Kelati (Newfoundland Time Zone)	October 17, 2024	TBA
8	599	"It's Not Okay to Ignore the News & Windows vs. Doors"	Charlie Demers vs. Lisa Baker (It's Not Okay to Ignore the News) & Graham Clark vs. Charles Haycock (Windows vs. Doors)	October 31, 2024	TBA
9	600	"Wine Appreciation & E-Bikes and E-Scooters (Re-Airing)"	Kathleen McGee vs. Erica Sigurdson (Wine Appreciation) & Peter Brown vs. Ryan Williams (E-Bikes and E-Scooters)	November 7, 2024	TBA
10	601	"Never Hold a Grudge & Kitchen Party Vs. Shed Party"	Elvira Kurt vs. Arthur Simeon (Never Hold a Grudge) & Ryan Dillon vs. Nikki Payne (Kitchen Party Vs. Shed Party)	November 21, 2024	TBA
11	602	"Move for Love & Jack of All Trades vs. Master of One"	Isabel Zaw-Tun vs. Paul Myrehaug (Move for Love) & Chad Anderson vs. Graham Chittenden (Jack of All Trades vs. Master of One)	November 28, 2024	TBA
12	603	"Pickup Trucks & The Customer is Always Right"	Katie Ellen-Humphries vs. Dan Taylor (Pickup Trucks) & Yumi Nagashima vs. Faris Hytiaa (The Customer is Always Right)	December 5, 2024	TBA
13	604	"Left vs. Right & Christmas Markets"	David Pryde vs. Derek Sequin (Left vs. Right) & Kate Davis vs. Ron Sparks (Christmas Markets)	December 12, 2024	TBA

=== Part II (2025) ===
Part two of season 19 aired in 2025 and consisted of 13 episodes.

No. in season	No. in series	Title	Debaters	Original air date	Production code
14	605	"Baby Showers & Winter in Alberta"	Erica Sigurdson vs. Dakota Ray Herbert (Baby Showers) & Brittany Lyseng vs. Ola Dada (Winter in Alberta)	January 9, 2025	TBA
15	606	"Fake Meat & Scuba Diving"	Rob Bebenek vs. Dave Hemstad (Fake Meat) & Elvira Kurt vs. Hunter Collins (Scuba Diving)	January 23, 2025	TBA
16	607	"Hawkins Cheezies & Conspiracy Theories"	Deborah Kimmett vs. Sean Cullen (Hawkins Cheezies) & Nathan Macintosh vs. Chris Locke (Conspiracy Theories)	January 30, 2025	TBA
17	608	"Breakup Songs & Hard Rock Cafe"	Anesti Danelis vs. Jan Caruana (Breakup Songs) & Elvira Kurt vs. Kyle Brownrigg (Hard Rock Cafe)	February 13, 2025	TBA
18	609	"Children vs. Parents: Who is Smarter? & Talent Shows"	Ivan Decker vs. Syd Bosel (Children vs. Parents: Who is Smarter?) & Sean Lecomber vs. Sterling Scott (Talent Shows)	February 20, 2025	TBA
19	610	"Virtual Meetings vs. In-Person Meetings & Volunteering"	Peter Brown vs. Julie Kim (Virtual Meetings vs. In-Person Meetings) & Maddy Kelly vs. Charlie Demers (Volunteering)	February 27, 2025	TBA
20	611	"Should we all do pottery? And love lineups?"	Jacob Samuel vs. Brittany Lyseng (Should we all do pottery?) & Abdul Aziz vs. Ryan Williams (Love lineups?)	March 6, 2025	TBA
21	612	"Should Americans move to the Maritimes? And does going to the dentist rule?"	Jay Malone vs. Nikki Payne (Should Americans move to the Maritimes?) & Mayce Galoni vs. Matt Wright (Does going to the dentist rule?)	March 13, 2025	TBA
22	613	"Are rings better than bracelets? And is it always great to be a trailblazer?"	Graham Clark vs. Heidi Brander (Are rings better than bracelets?) & Faris Hytiaa vs. Lara Rae (Is it always great to be a trailblazer?)	March 27, 2025	TBA
23	614	"Gulp, we're going there -- should Canada be the 51st state?"	Eric Peterson vs. Arthur Simeon (Should Canada be the 51st state?)	April 3, 2025	TBA
24	615	"Do billionaires have it harder than millionaires? And is there always something happening in Barrie, Ontario?"	Dave Hemstad vs. Don Kelly (Do billionaires have it harder than millionaires?) & Chris Quigley vs. Courtney Gilmour (Is there always something happening in Barrie, Ontario?)	April 10, 2025	TBA
25	616	"Shh! Is silence golden? Does a smoothie make a meal?"	Yumi Nagashima vs. Charlie Demers (Shh! Is silence golden?) & Katie-Ellen Humphries vs. Gavin Clarkson (Does a smoothie make a meal?)	April 17, 2025	TBA
26	617	"Do butter tarts beat Nanaimo bars? And is there no shame in quitting?"	Deborah Kimmett vs. Jon Steinberg (Do butter tarts beat Nanaimo bars?) & Graham Chittenden vs. Leonard Chan (Is there no shame in quitting?)	April 24, 2025	TBA
27	618	"Does nothing beat a day at the ballpark? And is Toronto the worst city in Canada to commute in?"	Patrick Dussault vs. Simon Rakoff (Does nothing beat a day at the ballpark?) & Isabel Zaw-Tun vs. Don Kelly (Is Toronto the worst city in Canada to commute in?)	May 8, 2025	TBA
28	619	"Should you raise your family in Winnipeg? And is compromise the best solution?"	Chad Anderson vs. Lara Rae (Should you raise your family in Winnipeg?) & Courtney Gilmour vs. Jon Dore (Is compromise the best solution?)	May 15, 2025	TBA
29	620	"Which is better: Plastic or Paper? And are you nobody until somebody hates you?"	Ivan Decker vs. Martha Chaves (Which is better: Plastic or Paper?) & Nikki Payne vs. Bruce Clark (Is compromise the best solution?)	May 22, 2025	TBA
30	621	"Are jeans the best pants? And is food delivery easier than ever?"	Stacey McGunnigle vs. Myles Anderson (Are jeans the best pants?) & Graham Clark vs. Lachlan Patterson (Is food delivery easier than ever?)	June 5, 2025	TBA
31	622	"Which is better: Mother's Day or Father's Day? And do coaches matter?"	Dave Hemstad vs. Elvira Kurt (Which is better: Mother's Day or Father's Day?) & Emmanuel Lomuro vs. Patrick Dussault (Do coaches matter?)	June 12, 2025	TBA

== Total (605 episodes + 4 extended debates) ==
605 total episodes have aired through nineteen seasons, plus four extended debates aired in season eight. Also a number of "re-edits" have aired, combining debates from different episodes into new episodes.
