= Dylan Mandlsohn =

Canadian stand-up comedian

- Born: 1979 or 1980 (age 45–46); Toronto, Canada
- Education: University of Windsor
- Occupations: Stand-up comedian, actor
- Years active: 1998-present

Dylan Mandlsohn is a Canadian stand-up comedian, impressionist, and actor. He is known for appearances on TV series, including 12 Monkeys and Nikita, and released a 2019 album produced by Grammy winner Dan Schlissel for his label Stand Up! Records, A Date With the Devil.

== Early life ==
Mandlsohn was raised in Toronto and was fascinated by comedy at an early age, inspired by Jim Carrey, Dana Carvey, and Rich Little. He studied drama at the University of Windsor.

== Career ==
Mandlsohn began performing in clubs at 17 and began touring the U.S. and Canada during college. He was a substitute teacher before moving into stand-up full-time. He is known for his family-friendly comedy that, in the words of one reviewer, "reins it in before it becomes too naughty". He was a member of Los Angeles improv troupe the Groundlings. He had his own half-hour special in 2007 on the Canadian series Comedy Now!.

He was a guest on two episodes of Canadian radio comedy show The Debaters. Mandlsohn has also had acting roles in several television series, including a CIA staffer in a 2010 episode of Nikita, a guard in a 2016 episode of 12 Monkeys, and a landlord in Leslie Nielsen's final film, 2010's Stonerville.

He is currently (March 2025) performing on Royal Caribbean's Icon of the Seas.
