= Kathleen McGee =

Canadian stand-up comedian (1981–2024)

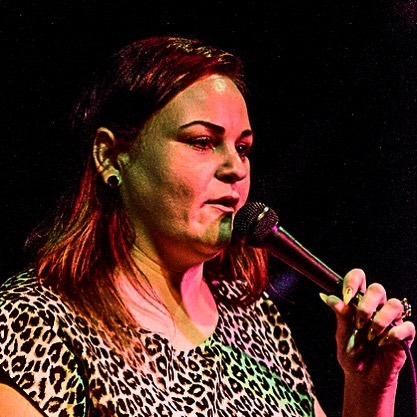
- McGee in 2017
- Born: April 5, 1981; Edmonton, Alberta, Canada
- Died: November 3, 2024 (aged 43)
- Occupation: Stand-up comedian
- Years active: 2005–2024

Kathleen McGee (April 5, 1981 – November 3, 2024) was a Canadian stand-up comedian from Edmonton, Alberta. Her performance at the Winnipeg Comedy Festival was nominated for a 2019 Canadian Comedy Award. Her debut full-length album, 2019's Deliciously Vulgar, was produced by Grammy winner Dan Schlissel for his label Stand Up! Records.

== Career ==
=== Stand-up comedy ===
McGee started performing stand-up comedy in Edmonton in 2005 after a bad break-up, and quickly became known for her provocative, bawdy and sometimes sexually explicit material, winning the annual Funniest Person With a Day Job competition in 2008 at Edmonton club The Comic Strip. She lived for several years in Vancouver, Toronto, and Los Angeles to advance her career, but by 2018 had settled back in Edmonton.

In 2017, she was a finalist in the SiriusXM competition Canada's Top Comic.

She was a regular columnist for Canadian magazine BeatRoute in 2015-16, writing the series Been There Done That: Questionable Advice From a Comedian.

In 2016, she was a headliner in the touring show Rape Is Real and Everywhere, in which all the comedians were also survivors of sexual abuse.

She was a guest panellist twice on the CBC Radio comedy series The Debaters.

=== Albums ===
McGee's Stand Up! Records debut Deliciously Vulgar, was released in 2019. Reviewer Richard Lanoie of The Serious Comedy Site called the album "clever, explicit, and extremely funny," and said he felt that McGee's likeable charm helped make her more intense material palatable and funny.

=== Podcasts ===
From 2019, she co-hosted The Dead Baby Bear Podcast with Canadian comic Sean Lecomber. Previously, she hosted Kathleen McGee is a Hot Mess, which ran for 89 episodes and ended in 2018.

== Personal life and death ==
McGee had a tattoo on her arm celebrating February 21, 2017, the day McDonald's began serving all-day breakfast in Canada, and another on her thigh of Cheers actress Shelley Long.

McGee was diagnosed with colorectal cancer in 2022. While she was considered cleared at one point, the cancer later spread to her liver, abdomen and behind her aorta. She died on November 3, 2024, at the age of 43.

== Awards and nominations ==
McGee was nominated for a 2019 Canadian Comedy Award, in the "Best Taped Live Performance" category, for her show "Hot Mess," recorded at the Winnipeg Comedy Festival.

== Discography ==
- Deliciously Vulgar (Stand Up! Records, 2019)
