= Case File 13 =

Book series by J. Scott Savage

- Zombie Kid (2012); Making the Team (2013); Evil Twins (2014); Curse of the Mummy's Uncle (2015)
- Author: J. Scott Savage
- Illustrator: Douglas Holgate
- Country: United States
- Language: English
- Genre: Children's fiction; Horror; Humor
- Publisher: HarperCollins
- Published: 2012–2015
- Website: jscottsavage.com

Case File 13 is a children's book series authored by American writer J. Scott Savage and illustrated by Australian artist Douglas Holgate.

The series combines elements of horror and humor, following three friends—Nick, Carter, and Angelo—as they encounter supernatural adventures.

== Books ==
1. Zombie Kid (2012)
2. Making the Team (2013)
3. Evil Twins (2014)
4. Curse of the Mummy's Uncle (2015)

== Synopsis ==
The series begins with Zombie Kid, where the protagonists' fascination with monsters leads them into real-life encounters with the undead. Each subsequent book presents a new supernatural challenge, blending comedy with spooky elements.

== Reception ==
Critics have noted the series' appeal to young readers who enjoy a mix of scares and laughs. The dynamic between the three main characters adds depth to the adventurous plots.
