= Gurcharan Singh Gill =

Indian genealogist (born c. 1935)

- Born: c. 1935; Moga, Punjab, India
- Website: http://myindiafamilyhistory.com/ (defunct)

Gurcharan Singh Gill (born c. 1935) is a genealogist and mathematician who is claimed to be the first Sikh convert to Mormonism. He served as the first mission president of the Bangalore India Mission. Gill is a retired (emeritus) math professor at Brigham Young University.

== Family ==
Gill was born into an agricultural Sikh family in present-day Moga, Moga district in Punjab, India. His father was Ram Singh and mother was Basant Kaur Sidhu of Dhudike village. Early in his life, a brother (Ajaib Singh) and sister (Nasib) of his died due to illness, which had a lasting impact on the young Gill. Gill married Vilo Pratt, with the couple having seven children. After his marriage, his Mormon family-in-law assisted Gill with bringing his seven surviving brothers in India to the United States. Gill's grandson is James Goldberg.

== Mormonism ==
After the death of Gill's two siblings, he became preoccupied with questions regarding what happens after death, feeling that the religions he was familiar with, namely Sikhism, Hinduism, and Islam, did not give satisfactory answers on the nature of the after-life. After arriving in the Fresno, California, the United States for his studies at Fresno State College, he began researching what Christian groups had to say about the matter and eventually came to discover the Church of Jesus Christ of Latter-day Saints. Gill did not agree with the Catholic and Protestant beliefs that people who had not been baptized in their lifetime would not be in heaven. However, Gill was convinced by the Mormon beliefs of the plan of salvation, premortal life, life after death, temples, and temple work, and the eternal link within a family, and became baptized as a Mormon. He also felt that the Mormon teachings complimented the Sikh beliefs he was raised with. He was baptized on January 7, 1956. In 1993, Gill returned to India, where he served as the first mission president of the Bangalore India Mission in Bangalore, India. In 2018, Gill reached out to Church leaders in Bengaluru, New Delhi, and Hyderabad to propose commemorating the mission's silver jubilee with discussions relating to family history and temple service. At the time, the closest Mormon temple was in Hong Kong. President Russell M. Nelson would later announce the plan for a proposed temple in Bengaluru. Approximately 10,000 Latter-day Saints live in India.

== Genealogical research ==
After becoming a Mormon, Gill returned to his native India to conduct genealogical research into his family by scouring and locating native-sources. At the time, genealogical research was not very emphasized or promoted by Indian Latter-day saints members. The local, traditional genealogists of Gill's village had left for Pakistan during the 1947 partition, thus Gill had to at-first rely on oral-history narrated by his relatives to document his genealogy.

Gill discovered in 1986 that tax-records in the Moga district were attached to a genealogical pedigree going back four generations, with records dating back to the 1850s. These records have been described as being one of the few surviving records of Punjabi genealogy, as census records in India (specifically enumeration data) were rarely preserved. The more recent records were written in Punjabi using Gurmukhi script and the older records were written in Urdu in Nastaliq script. The names of more than 250,000 individuals have been extracted from the records by Gill. The genealogical importance of such records for the purpose of family history research was raised by Gurcharan Singh Gill. The Shajjra Nasb (also known as Kursee Nama (Note: Also spelt as 'Shajra Nasab'. Kursee Nama is also spelt as 'Kurseenama' or 'Kursinama'.)) records of villages of Moga district and partly of Firozpur district from 1887 to 1958 have been digitized by the Church of Jesus Christ of Latter-day Saints via FamilySearch and are available for online viewing. These records detail land ownership pedigrees for families of the village.

On July 17, 2010, Gill held a workshop at the University of the Fraser Valley, Abbotsford, which touched-upon the objective of gaining permission from Deputy Commissioners and the Punjab government to preserve thee records electronically through the means of digitization and indexing at no cost to the districts or the Punjab government. Furthermore, he stressed upon the importance of translating the records into English.

== Education and career ==
Gill left India to pursue studies in USA in 1954. Gill earned a bachelor's degree (B.Sc.) in Mathematics and Physics from BYU in 1958 and a master's degree (M.Sc., 1960) and doctorate (PhD, 1965) from the University of Utah, both in mathematics. Gill worked as a professor of mathematics at Brigham Young University from 1960 to 1963 and again from 1965 to 1999. After retiring in 1999, he dedicated himself to genealogical research, with an emphasis on the land records of Moga district.

== Bibliography ==
- Deeper Roots of the Gill, Bhatti, Sidhu, Brar, Tur, and Related Jat and Rajput Clans (2008)
- Extraction of Pedigrees from Revenue Records of Punjab, India (2016)
