= The Bent Sword =

2010 novel by Stephen Gashler

- The Bent Sword cover art by Tanya Quinlan.
- Author: Stephen Gashler
- Country: United States
- Language: English
- Genre: Fantasy, Young adult fiction
- Publisher: Boneville Books, an imprint of Cedar Fort, Inc. (US)
- Published: 7 July 2010
- Media type: Print (paperback)

The Bent Sword is a young adult fantasy novel written and illustrated by Stephen Gashler, published by Cedar Fort, Inc. in 2010. Gashler adapted the book into a stage musical for New Play Project by the same name, having composed the lyrics and music.

== Synopsis ==
In medieval England, a daydreaming peasant named Steffin wants to pursue his imaginary quest, but he feels trapped by society. When an eccentric storyteller insists that Steffin's quest is real, Steffin is forced to take his destiny into his own hands and seek out his arch nemesis, the dark Lord of Boredom. Through a reckless chain of Don Quixote-like adventures, colorful friends catch Steffin's dream, and the powers that oppose them begin to unveil themselves. But when reality kicks in and his friends have had enough, will Steffin be able to pull them back together and complete their quest, or will Lord Bore succeed in quelling the greatest of all adventures?

== Musical ==
The musical version of The Bent Sword was first produced at the Provo Theater in Utah by New Play Project in November 2010. It is available for performance in the public domain. Stephen Gashler played the leading role of Steffin, and his friend since middle school, Andrew Whittaker, played Sir Him. Before playing their characters on stage, Gashler and Whittaker had invented Steffin and Sir Him about fourteen years prior, thus patterning the story of the novel and musical in which imaginary characters are made real. The show was directed by Teresa Gashler, Stephen's wife.
