= Charles Demers =

Canadian comedian, activist, voice actor, and writer (born 1980)

- Born: July 1, 1980 (age 46); Vancouver, British Columbia, Canada
- Other name: Charlie Demers
- Occupations: Comedian; political activist; voice actor; writer
- Political party: New Democratic Party; OneCity Vancouver
- Website: charliedemers.com

Charles Demers (/dəˈmɛərz/; born 1980), sometimes credited as Charlie Demers, is a Canadian comedian, political activist, voice actor, and writer. He was born in Vancouver, British Columbia, and self-identifies as Québécois based on his family descent.

== Writing ==
Demers has published four books and two collections of essays. His first essay collection, Vancouver Special, was nominated for a Hubert Evans Non-Fiction Prize. He has also co-written a book of letters.

== Stand-up comedy and voice acting ==
He frequently performs stand-up comedy at live venues across Canada and on CBC Radio One, where he often appears on the comedy panel show The Debaters. Demers was one of the hosts of the CityNews show The List.

Demers has provided voices for several episodes of CBC Radio show and podcast This Is That.

He is the voice of Walter from the 2016 Netflix original series Beat Bugs. Demers also voices Night Light in the My Little Pony: Friendship Is Magic season seven episode "Once Upon a Zeppelin" and provides the voice of former bully Dirk Savage in another Netflix series, The Last Kids on Earth.

In 2017, he released the comedy album Fatherland. At the Juno Awards of 2018, the album was nominated for the Juno Award for Comedy Album of the Year.

In 2025 he had a voice acting role in the animated comedy series Super Team Canada.

== Political views and activism ==
Demers used to be the membership secretary for the Coalition of Progressive Electors. In more recent municipal elections, he has been a supporter of OneCity Vancouver, a progressive civic party of which his wife is a founding member.

On 8 October 2018, Demers was the guest on the popular interview based podcast WTF with Marc Maron. Maron mentioned that Demers has opened for him at stand-up comedy shows in Canada.

In the Marc Maron podcast Demers talks about his political beliefs and his early affiliation as a teenager with a small Marxist activist group in Vancouver. His commitment to the group was such that he initially decided to forgo going to university and instead get a job in a lighting factory where he hoped to increase the political consciousness of his fellow workers. He admitted however that the aims of the organization were somewhat vague and that the efforts to raise the consciousness of fellow workers were mostly met with bemusement. Nevertheless, Demers retains left-wing political views and hosts the monthly podcast Well Reds A Left Book Podcast.

In Maron's interview with Demers, Maron describes himself politically as "a Lefty to a degree" and suggests that Demers is further to the left. Maron notes the struggle in the US Democratic Party between the more leftist section of the party and the centrist section, with the latter considering the Leftists to be in danger of making the party unelectable. Demers responds by stating that "the problem is that the Left and the centre often have to work together but the Left understands the anger that is on the Right and the centre just doesn't understand anger, they think that anger always has to be ugly."

Demers lost his mother to cancer when he was ten years old. He describes the trauma of the experience in the Maron podcast but also describes it as "an early political lesson" in the importance of free healthcare that was embedded in him by that experience and by his father's words at the time. Another such lesson in the benefit of living in Canada came with the experience of Demers' mother-in-law who is originally from Hong Kong and moved to Canada from Chicago as a result of Pierre Trudeau's stated policy of multiculturalism. Demers recounts that on his wedding night his mother-in-law demanded that he acknowledge the part that Pierre Trudeau played in bringing Demers and his wife together. Despite these Canadian advantages however Demers suggests "in Canada in general there is a tendency towards smugness" because Canadians believe their country has far fewer problems than the US but that this leads to "people putting off dealing with Canada's very real problems." He goes on to mention environmental issues, inequality and unclean drinking water on indigenous reserves as examples.

In March 2019, Demers wrote about the rebranding of the SiriusXM Canada satellite radio station "Canada Laughs" as "Just for Laughs Radio and the station's shelved plan to sideline independently produced Canadian content in favour of audio recordings of sets from the Just for Laughs comedy festival from mostly American comedians, in an article published in the socialist magazine Jacobin.

== Personal life ==
Demers is married and has a daughter and a son. His experience as a father with his first child inspired his co-writing the book The Dad Dialogues.

Demers is a practising Anglican.

== Bibliography ==
=== Fiction ===
- The Prescription Errors (2009)
- Property Values (2018)
- Primary Obsessions (2020)
- Noonday Dark (2022)
- I Sure Do (2026) (illustrated by Dorothy Leung)

=== Essays ===
- Vancouver Special (2009)
- The Horrors: An A to Z of Funny Thoughts on Awful Things (2015)
- The Dad Dialogues: A Correspondence on Fatherhood (and the Universe) (2016) (Co-written with George Bowering)
- The Eh Team (2025)
