= Cedar Fort, Inc. =

Publisher

- Status: Active
- Founded: 1986
- Founders: Lee Nelson, Lyle Mortimer
- Country of origin: United States
- Headquarters location: 2373 W. 700 S. Springville, UT.
- Distribution: Worldwide
- Imprints: Front Table Books, Bonneville Books, Sweetwater Books, Hobble Creek Press, CFI, Plain Sight Publishing, Council Press, Pioneer Plus, Horizon Publishers
- Official website: www.cedarfortbooks.com

Cedar Fort, Inc. is a large to mid-sized publisher based in Utah, USA. Founded in 1986 by Lyle Mortimer and Lee Nelson, Cedar Fort has evolved from a niche Latter-day Saints book publisher, to a national multimedia company, with offerings in film, audiobooks, art and gifts alongside its book catalog. In 2015, Publishers Weekly named Cedar Fort one of its top ten fastest growing publishers.

== Imprints ==
- Front Table Books - cookbooks and outdoors. Titles include:
  - Artisan Caramels
  - A to Z Cookbook for Kids
- Bonneville Books - Latter-Day Saint themed fiction, including romance and young adult fantasy. Titles include:
  - Mile 21
  - My Loving Vigil Keeping
- Sweetwater Books
  - Mrs. Drew Plays Her Hand
- Hobble Creek Press - outdoors, preparedness and gardening.
- CFI - LDS doctrinal titles for youth and adults.
- Plain Sight Publishing - national non-fiction.
- Council Press - one of the oldest imprints of Cedar Fort; primarily historical fiction, near death experiences and the works of Lee Nelson.
- Pioneer Plus - gifts and journals.
- Horizon Publishers - titles from the acquisition of the former publishing house of the same name; primarily LDS-themed imprint. Titles:
  - Prophecy: Key to the Future

== History ==
=== Founding ===
Cedar Fort, Inc was founded in May 1986 and initially produced LDS Books for other publishers. The company's first book, Beyond the Veil by Lee Nelson (author of the Storm Testament Series), was published in September 1987. Beyond the Veil became an instant bestseller leading to an extended series which has sold more than 250,000 books.

=== Merges/acquisitions ===
Over the years, Cedar Fort has merged with companies and acquired others. Most notable of these are Lee Nelson's Council Press (1998), Horizon Publishers (2004), Pioneer Plus (2004) and Books & Things Catalog (2012)

==== Pioneer Plus ====
Pioneer Plus created and sold LDS products for over 30 years before becoming a part of Cedar Fort, Inc. Cedar Fort continues to produce over 150 Pioneer Plus products every year.

=== Current operations ===
Cedar Fort began publishing for a national audience in 1998. The company currently produces and sells around 165 books, various CDs, DVDs and ebooks every year.

In recent years, it has increased distribution with distributors and national chains such as Ingram, Baker & Taylor, Books a Million, Anderson, Costco, Barnes & Noble, Sam's Club and Brodart.

== Film distribution ==
=== The Saratov Approach ===
In 2014, Cedar Fort launched its LDS DVD & Blu-ray distribution with the film The Saratov Approach. The movie grossed more than $2.1 million at the box office. The DVD and Blu-ray distribution began on March 11, 2015.

=== Wayward ===
The only other film project that Cedar Fort has taken on was Wayward, which re-tells the Parable of the Prodigal Son from the Bible set in modern times.

The film was released in theatres on November 7, 2015, and is available on DVD.

List of feature releases

- More Than the Tattooed Mormon (2018)
- The Book of Mormon Made Easier, Part 1: 1 Nephi to Words of Mormon (The Gospel Studies Series) (2007)
- Is He Nuts?: Why a Gay Man Would Become a Member of the Church of Jesus Christ (2019)

== Controversy ==
=== Gay author biography dispute ===
In August 2013, Cedar Fort was involved in a dispute over the content of the author biography for the book Woven, a young adult fantasy novel. The author, Michael Jensen, wanted his biography to include the fact that he lived "in Salt Lake City with his boyfriend" — just as his co-author's biography included reference to the co-author's wife. Cedar Fort's acquisitions editor, Angie Workman, sent Jensen an email citing concerns that including the reference would harm Cedar Fort's relationship with LDS-owned bookstores, an assertion that Seagull Book officials said was "speculation". Jensen offered to change "boyfriend" to the non-gender-specific "partner", but Cedar Fort declined. When Jensen persisted with his biography request, Cedar Fort's founder and publisher Lyle Mortimer refused and, according to Jensen, became belligerent and offensive, allegedly accusing Jensen of trying to destroy families and telling him that "God gave you a penis for a reason". In a media interview about the controversy, Cedar Fort's then-president, Bryce Mortimer, did not address Jensen's allegations about Lyle Mortimer's behavior, but did say that Jensen was merely using "our company as a springboard for supporting [homosexuality]".

The ensuing media furore eventually resulted in Cedar Fort returning publishing rights to Jensen and his co-author, who, thanks to the international attention, sold Woven at auction to Scholastic Press. The controversy also triggered a petition from Utah authors (including Carla Kelly and Jeffrey Scott Savage), most of them LDS and many signed by Cedar Fort, criticizing Mortimer for his alleged actions. Further confusing the issue, Cedar Fort had just published The Reluctant Blogger, which includes a sympathetic gay supporting character, leading several of the authors to complain about Cedar Fort's inconsistent approach to homosexuality.

=== Religious book ===
In 2014, Cedar Fort published The Lost Teachings of Jesus on the Sacred Place of Women by the Brigham Young University professor Alonzo L. Gaskill. The book is based on the findings of the late 19th century Russian scholar Nicholas Notovitch, which contain the purported "lost teachings of Jesus Christ" from an ancient manuscript housed at a Buddhist monastery in India. Both Notovitch's and Alonzo's works have been challenged over the veracity of the source material. "It's absolutely fraudulent," said University of Utah professor Dr. David Bokovoy in his opinion as to the book's source or accuracy.
