= Super Team Canada =

- Genre: Adult animation; Comedy; Satire; Superhero
- Created by: Joel H. Cohen
- Directed by: Gary Ye
- Voices of: Will Arnett; Cobie Smulders; Charles Demers; Veena Sood; Ceara Morgana; Brian Drummond; Kevin McDonald
- Opening theme: "Super Team Canada!" by Bryan Adams
- Ending theme: "Super Team Canada!" (instrumental)
- Country of origin: Canada
- Original language: English
- No. of seasons: 1
- No. of episodes: 10 (20 segments)

Production
- Executive producers: Will Arnett; Alex Cichon; Joel H. Cohen; Kristin Cummings; Marc Forman; Jennifer Twiner McCarron
- Running time: 22 minutes (11 minutes per segment)
- Production companies: Atomic Cartoons; Pure Canadian Evil, Inc.; Electric Avenue; Bell Media

Original release
- Network: Crave (Canada); Peacock/Tubi (United States)
- Release: May 16, 2025

Super Team Canada is a Canadian adult animated television series created by Joel H. Cohen that premiered on May 16, 2025 on Crave as the streamer's first original animated series. The series is produced by Atomic Cartoons, Bell Media, and Electric Avenue. The series stars Will Arnett (who also served as an executive producer), Cobie Smulders, Charles Demers, Veena Sood, Ceara Morgana, Brian Drummond, and Kevin McDonald.

== Plot ==
The series follows a group of Canadian superheroes who are tasked with protecting Earth after the alien villain Ted Zorg Sr. kills the Righteousness Club, the premiere superhero team.

== Cast ==
The series' cast includes:

- Will Arnett as Breakaway, a former hockey player and the leader of Super Team Canada.
- Cobie Smulders as Niagara Falls / Joan Shoop, a blue-skinned woman who can manipulate water.
- Charles Demers as Poutine, a French Canadian lumberjack who wields arm-mounted guns that shoot his namesake.
- Veena Sood as RCM-PC (Robotic Crime Management Polite Computer), a multi-purpose robot created from a Canada Post mailbox.
- Ceara Morgana as Chinook, a 12-year-old First Nations girl who can manipulate ice.
- Brian Drummond as Sasquatchewan, a sasquatch from the Canadian Prairies.
  - Drummond also voices the series' narrator.
- Kevin McDonald as the Prime Minister of Canada, who oversees Super Team Canada.

Guest voice actors, voicing minor or one-off characters, include Jay Baruchel, Bryan Adams and Dhirendra Miyanger.

== Episodes ==
Gary Ye directed all of the episodes.

No.	Title	Written by	Original release date	United States air date
1a	"And So It Begins…"			
1b	"Do You Mind If We Continue?"			
2a	"The Boys from Brantford"			
2b	"Patch Me If You Can"			
3a	"Who Wants To Kill a Windmillionaire?"			
3b	"P.E.(a)I."			
4a	"Wed on Arrival"			
4b	"Brine Never Pays"			
5a	"Shy Noon"			
5b	"High School Abuse-ical"			
6a	"The Pooch Pack Goes Wack"			
6b	"Permission Impossible"			
7a	"From Dork To Dawn"			
7b	"Polite Raiders of The Lost Temple of Doom"			
8a	"One Hit Blunder"			
8b	"Careful What You Task For"			
9a	"A Sticky Situation"			
9b	"Back to the Present"			
10a	"Uh Oh!"			
10b	"Uh Oh 2: The Heretic"			

== Production ==
Super Team Canada is produced by Atomic Cartoons, Bell Media, and Electric Avenue. Series creator Joel H. Cohen, who is Canadian, created the series to represent Canada and its culture after spending years working in the United States, drawing influence from Super Friends and Rocket Robin Hood. Canadian musician Bryan Adams performed the series' opening theme.

== Broadcast ==
Super Team Canada premiered on Crave on May 16, 2025 with new episodes being added. In the United Kingdom, it is available on ITVX. In the United States, the series was added to Tubi, The Roku Channel and Peacock in July 2025.

== Awards ==
Award / Film Festival	Date of ceremony	Category	Recipient(s)	Result	Ref.
Canadian Screen Awards	2026	Best Animated Program or Series	Alex Cichon, Joel Bradley, Will Arnett, Joel H. Cohen, Robert Cohen, Jennifer Twiner McCarron	Won	
Canadian Screen Awards	2026	Best Voice Performance	Will Arnett	Won	
Canadian Screen Awards	2026	Best Voice Performance	Dhirendra	Nominated	
