= The Last Kids on Earth =

2015 children's graphic novel and series

- Author: Max Brallier
- Illustrator: Douglas Holgate
- Country: United States
- Language: English
- Genre: Children's novel; Middle-Grade Literature; Action & Adventure Literature; Comedy; Apocalyptic fiction
- Publisher: Viking Books for Young Readers (US); Egmont Books Ltd (UK)
- Published: October 13, 2015 – present
- Media type: Print (hardcover and paperback), Audiobook

The Last Kids on Earth is a children's illustrated novel and subsequent book series by American author Max Brallier, illustrated by Douglas Holgate, with audiobook format narrated by Robbie Daymond. Novels in the series have been recognized on Best Seller lists of both The New York Times and USA Today. This book is recommended for teens/pre-teens in the "middle school" demographic. The series currently includes 10 books and has been adapted into an animated series by Netflix.

In the initial story, a foster child and an optimistic loner named Jack Sullivan finds himself abandoned in a cartoonish end-of-the-world apocalypse. He thrives on freedom, junk food, and video games while building a team of his classmates to fight off zombies as well as a trove of campy monsters who have also somehow appeared. The series treats its subject matter with lighthearted humor rather than adult horror.

Subsequent books continue the same comic dystopian scenario with the team of mismatched school kids facing new antagonists, new monsters and new challenges.

== List of novels ==
- The Last Kids on Earth (2015) #1
- The Last Kids on Earth and the Zombie Parade (2016) #2
- The Last Kids on Earth and the Nightmare King (2017) #3
- The Last Kids on Earth and the Cosmic Beyond (2018) #4
- The Last Kids on Earth and the Midnight Blade (2019) #5
- The Last Kids on Earth Survival Guide (2019) (Standalone)
- The Last Kids on Earth: June's Wild Flight (2020) (Standalone)
- The Last Kids on Earth and the Skeleton Road (2020) #6
- The Last Kids on Earth: Thrilling Tales From the Tree House (2021) (Standalone)
- The Last Kids on Earth and the Doomsday Race (2021) #7
- The Last Kids on Earth: Quint and Dirk's Hero Quest (2022) (Standalone)
- The Last Kids on Earth and the Forbidden Fortress (2022) #8
- The Last Kids on Earth and the Monster Dimension (2023) #9
- The Last Kids on Earth Book 1 Graphic Novel (2024) (standalone)
- The Last Kids on Earth and the Destructor’s Lair (2025) #10

== Summary ==
The ten books (excluding standalones) follow a thirteen-year-old boy named Jack Sullivan, who lives in his foster brother's tree house after a zombie outbreak hits his hometown, Wakefield, Massachusetts. He is accompanied by his best friend Quint Baker, who loves experimenting; June Del Toro, a strong, brave girl who used to be the school newspaper's editor-in-chief; and Dirk Savage, the local bully with exceptional fighting skills. The friends fight one monster in each book, while trying to stay alive, and stop an entity named Rezzoch, who wants to take over Earth.

== Reception ==
The series is recognized as a best–seller on both The New York Times and USA Today book lists, with the publisher boasting seven million copies in print.

== Adaptations ==
=== Animated series ===
On February 26, 2018, it was announced that Netflix had a series order to an animated television adaptation of the book series. The first season, a single hour–long special covering the plot of the first book, was released in September 2019 to coincide with the release of the fifth novel. The second season, covering the plot of the second book, was released in April 2020 and consists of ten episodes. Production companies involved in the series include Thunderbird Entertainment's animation studio Atomic Cartoons. Season 3 was released on October 16, 2020.

=== Live-action series ===
On June 30, 2026, Disney+ and Disney Channel received a pilot order to a live-action adaptation of the Netflix series under Blue Ant Studios, helmed by Chad Fiveash, James Stoteraux, and Kevin Tancharoen.
