= The Last Kids on Earth (TV series) =

Children's animation streaming television series

- Book 1 promotional poster
- Genre: Apocalyptic fiction; Adventure; Comedy
- Created by: Max Brallier
- Based on: The Last Kids on Earth by Max Brallier
- Directed by: William Lau (1); Steve Rolston (2–3)
- Voices of: Nick Wolfhard; Charles Demers; Montserrat Hernandez; Garland Whitt
- Theme music composer: Mike Shields
- Composer: Marcelo Trevino
- Countries of origin: United States; Canada
- Original language: English
- No. of seasons: 3
- No. of episodes: 21 (+ 1 special)

Production
- Executive producers: Max Brallier; Matthew Berkowitz; Jennifer McCarron; Scott Peterson
- Editor: Darren Bachynski
- Running time: 23–60 minutes 27 minutes (special)
- Production companies: Atomic Cartoons; Netflix Animation Studios

Original release
- Network: Netflix
- Release: September 17, 2019 – April 6, 2021

The Last Kids on Earth is a children's animated television series, based on the book series of the same name by Max Brallier, that premiered on Netflix on September 17, 2019, with an hour-long special. A ten-episode second season, or "Book 2", titled The Last Kids on Earth and the Zombie Parade, premiered on April 17, 2020. The third and final season, also known as "Book 3", was released on October 16, 2020. An interactive special, subtitled Happy Apocalypse to You, was released on April 6, 2021.

== Voice cast and characters ==
Character	Voiced by	Appearances			
Character	Voiced by	Book 1	Book 2	Book 3	Book 4
Jack Sullivan	Nick Wolfhard	Main	Main	Main	Main
Dirk Savage	Charles Demers	Main	Main	Main	Main
June Del Toro	Montserrat Hernandez	Main	Main	Main	Main
Quint Baker	Garland Whitt	Main	Main	Main	Main
Rover	Brian Drummond	Main	Main	Main	Main
Bardle	Mark Hamill			Main	Main
Skaelka	Catherine O'Hara			Main	Main
Thrull	Keith David	Guest		Main	
Chef	Bruce Campbell		Main	Main	Main
Rezzoch	Rosario Dawson		Main (Note: Dawson is credited as main cast from Book 2, Episode 9 onwards.)	Main	Main

=== Main ===
- Nick Wolfhard as Jack Sullivan, a 13-year-old orphan and gamer turned hero thanks to the apocalypse.
- Charles Demers as Dirk Savage, a former school bully turned strongman and monster fighter on Jack's team. He likes cooking and gardening.
- Montserrat Hernandez as June Del Toro, a tomboyish 13-year-old girl who is Jack's crush but did not reciprocate his feelings, but starts to develop some in Book 2. She was trying to survive on her own until her parents come back for her with a rescue party; but she joins Jack's team and learns to have fun during the apocalypse. She was editor-in-chief of the school's paper.
- Garland Whitt as Quint Baker, Jack's nerdy best friend who invents most of the gadgets the kids use to survive in their post-apocalyptic environment.
- Brian Drummond as the vocal effects for Rover, a blue-furred mountain lion monster who befriends Jack in Book 1 and becomes the team's pet and mascot.

=== Villains ===
- Keith David as Thrull, the main antagonist in Book 2. He is a rhinoceros-like monster that acts as an ally of the group at first before betraying them and his fellow monsters near the end of the season.
- Rosario Dawson as Rezzoch, A sinister member of the Cosmic Terror race that acts as the main antagonist of the series as revealed in Book 2, episode 2; has her first lines and first full appearance in Book 2, episode 8 before becoming a series regular as of the 9th and Book 2 finale episodes.

=== Supporting ===
- Mark Hamill as Bardle, a wise troll-like monster that acts as a wizard that lives in Joe's Pizza who, like June, has been investigating the most recent phenomena and paranormal events.
- Catherine O'Hara as Skaelka, a female, orange reptilie monster warrior that takes up residence in Joe's Pizza and becomes a friend of June's.
- Bruce Campbell as Chef, a green four-armed monster that lives in Joe´s Pizza.

== Episodes ==
=== Series overview ===
Series overview
Season	Episodes	Originally released
Book 1	1	September 17, 2019
Book 2	10	April 17, 2020
Book 3	10	October 16, 2020
Special		April 6, 2021

=== Book 1 (2019) ===
No. overall	No. in season	Title	Directed by	Written by	Original release date
1	1	"The Last Kids on Earth"	Will Lau	Max Brallier & Scott Peterson	September 17, 2019
Living solo in his recently-monster-infested town, 13-year-old Jack will have to think fast, find friends, and get creative if he wants to survive.

=== Book 2 (2020) ===
No. overall	No. in season	Title	Directed by	Written by	Original release date
2	1	"Mall Quest"	Steve Rolston	Max Brallier	April 17, 2020
Fed up with his friends' bickering, Jack hopes a quest to the mall will get the buds back on good terms — because this is getting annoying.
3	2	"Jack the Slayer"	Steve Rolston	Jennifer Muro	April 17, 2020
Jack's attempts to impress his monstrous new pals with his uprising tale upsets June, Quint and Dirk, who feel like he's taking all the credit.
4	3	"Bestiary Master"	Steve Rolston	Scott D. Peterson	April 17, 2020
Feeling useless when it comes to the fine art of fighting monsters, Quint sets out to prove himself to his friends.
5	4	"The Zombie Parade"	Steve Rolston	Haley Mancini	April 17, 2020
While exploring a graveyard, Jack and Quint get emotional — really emotional — as they face a deadly venomous monster. Meanwhile, June and Dirk find they have a lot in common.
6	5	"The Thrull of Victory"	Steve Rolston	Joshua Pruett	April 17, 2020
While Thrull trains Jack to go after monsters and zombies with a new attitude, Quint and Dirk dig through trash — and June follows a hunch.
7	6	"Stay on Target"	Steve Rolston	Joshua Pruett	April 17, 2020
Quint, Dirk and June are pumped for their up-all-night zombie stakeout. But Jack's running late... and he's supposed to bring the snacks.
8	7	"June Gloom"	Steve Rolston	Haley Mancini	April 17, 2020
When the gang visits June's old house, Jack assumes it'll be a fun walk down memory lane. But the crew instead learns an important lesson: Never assume.
9	8	"Follow That Butler"	Steve Rolston	Max Brallier	April 17, 2020
After adding another monster to the bestiary, Jack, June, Quint and Dirk learn a troubling truth: Their work is far from over.
10	9	"Always Darkest"	Steve Rolston	Scott D. Peterson	April 17, 2020
Jack's vow to never trust another monster is put to the test. Quint, Dirk and June look to acquire a little — well, actually a lot — of weed killer.
11	10	"Dawn of Rezzoch"	Steve Rolston	Jennifer Muro	April 17, 2020
Quint's been captured, Thrull's on a rampage and Jack's got a wish: to put an end to all of this mayhem, once and for all.

=== Book 3 (2020) ===
No. overall	No. in season	Title	Directed by	Written by	Original release date
12	1	"Energy Crisis"	Steve Rolston	Jennifer Muro	October 16, 2020
Desperate for a reliable energy source, Jack, June, Quint and Dirk head to the planetarium, where a generator awaits — along with something else.
13	2	"Zombies Killed the Radio Star"	Steve Rolston	Jalysa Conway	October 16, 2020
The gang makes a stunning discovery at a fire station, Jack falls head over heels for a video game, and June has an urge to communicate.
14	3	"Tournament of the Dead"	Steve Rolston	Joshua Pruett	October 16, 2020
Feeling June, Quint and Dirk need to stop working so hard, Jack convinces his pals to take part in an over-the-top tournament with the monsters.
15	4	"Nightmare King"	Steve Rolston	Haley Mancini	October 16, 2020
Jack and the gang close in on a much-needed antenna for their radio. Meanwhile, all four of the kids experience odd visions of a dark future.
16	5	"Junkyard Jack"	Steve Rolston	Jalysa Conway	October 16, 2020
As Jack's anxiety about the future continues to grow, he and the team scramble to find the antenna for the radio.
17	6	"Tunnel Vision"	Steve Rolston	Scott D. Peterson	October 16, 2020
Jack sets out to confront the Wretch, June gets on Quint's nerves, and Dirk learns of an unappetizing third test to become an honorary monster.
18	7	"Zom-B-Goners"	Steve Rolston	Max Brallier	October 16, 2020
Everyone leaps into action when an exhausted Quint discovers that his zom-b-gone torches are offline. Meanwhile, Dirk is forced to team up with Chef.
19	8	"Funland"	Steve Rolston	Jennifer Muro	October 16, 2020
Jack convinces June, Quint and Dirk to go to an amusement park, where the friends quickly discover they aren't the only ones there.
20	9	"Belly of the Beast"	Steve Rolston	Joshua Pruett	October 16, 2020
After Rezzoch pulls Jack into an alternate realm, Bardle transports June, Quint and Dirk in hopes they can save him before it's too late.
21	10	"Stay Tuned"	Steve Rolston	Scott D. Peterson	October 16, 2020
Finally free from Jack's head, the weary gang reinhabits their bodies only to learn that — surprise, surprise — the battle is far from over.

=== Special (2021) ===
No. overall	No. in season	Title	Directed by	Original release date
—	—	"Happy Apocalypse to You"	Steve Rolston	April 6, 2021
It's June's birthday so she, Jack, Quint and Dirk go search around Wakefield to gather supplies for the party while making choices they come across.

== Production ==
On September 26, 2017, it was announced that the Vancouver-based Thunderbird Entertainment's animation studio Atomic Cartoons had optioned the screen rights on Max Brallier's book series The Last Kids on Earth with the intention of producing an animated television series.

On February 26, 2018, it was announced that Netflix had given the production a series order. Executive producers include Brallier, Scott Peterson, Jennifer McCarron, and Matthew Berkowitz. Brallier and Peterson are also expected to write the series as well. Production companies involved in the series include Thunderbird Entertainment's animation studio Atomic Cartoons.

On March 13, 2019, the series cast was announced, including Mark Hamill, Rosario Dawson, Catherine O'Hara, Keith David, Bruce Campbell, Garland Whitt, Montserrat Hernandez, Charles Demers, and Nick Wolfhard as the lead character Jack Sullivan.

It was initially reported that the series would be released on May 30, 2019, but it instead premiered on September 17, 2019.

== Merchandise ==
Jakks Pacific launched a toyline based on the series in early 2020. Outright Games published a video game tie-in The Last Kids on Earth and the Staff of Doom, for across consoles and PC in 2021. A graphic novel, subtitled Thrilling Tales from the Tree House, is currently released as of April 6, 2021.

== Reception ==
The series received a mixed reception. Ashley Moulton of Common Sense Media reviewed the interactive special, "The Last Kids on Earth: Happy Apocalypse to You," describing it a "fun interactive episode" with scary scenes and cartoon violence. She stated that because of the special's format, some elements from the original series are lacking, but that the special is "very fun nonetheless."

=== Awards ===
Year	Award	Category	Nominee(s)	Result
2020	Daytime Emmy Awards	Outstanding Special Class Animated Program	Max Brallier, Matthew Berkowitz, Jennifer McCarron, Scott Peterson	Won
