= New Play Project =

Defunct non-profit organization

- Formation: 2006
- Founders: James Goldberg, Arisael Rivera, Bianca Dillard, Julie Saunders, Jennefer Franklin
- Legal status: 501(c)(3)
- Purpose: To develop and produce local playwrights
- Headquarters: Provo, Utah
- Location: United States
- Website: newplayproject.org Defunct

New Play Project was a non-profit organization founded in Provo, Utah, by four Brigham Young University students. As of 2024, it is no longer a functional organization. NPP was dedicated to writing and producing new plays to give emerging Latter-day Saint writers a place to produce their work while maintaining their standards and values. It primarily produced short play festivals (several short plays bound together by one theme), but occasionally took on larger projects (as in Really Cool and Smart and Better Than You and Swallow the Sun). It is the first such organization to flourish in the area (which is known for theater performance), and produced more than 70 original plays (and workshopped more than 200) since its inception in 2006.

== Origins ==
New Play Project was founded April 2006 by Brigham Young University students James Goldberg, Arisael Rivera, Julie Saunders and Jennefer Franklin as an attempt to produce new play scripts they developed. Bianca Dillard almost immediately joined the group and developed the continuing workshop program.

In August 2006, sponsored by the BYU Experimental Theatre Group, it held its first production, a 10-minute play festival titled Love Songs and Negotiations. In October 2006 it held another play festival titled Palms, which featured plays revolving around religious themes. At the beginning of December 2006, it held its last play festival of the year titled In Progress.

In 2007, New Play Project officially separated itself from BYU and was incorporated with the state of Utah as a 501(c)3 non-profit organization. The next seven shows were performed in Provo City Library's Bullock Room. In December 2007, New Play Project moved to the old Provo Theatre Company building at 105 N. 100 East.

== Core programs ==
Playwright workshop
NPP held a weekly program where any playwright could submit plays to be "workshopped." These plays were read out loud, discussed and critiqued for the playwright's benefit. The workshop functioned as a classroom for the attending writers and actors to explore and understand the principles of writing a good story.

Themed short play festivals
Approximately every ten weeks, New Play Project produced a collection of short plays centered on a theme. A script selection committee chose the best plays submitted for the production, directors and actors were found and the plays rehearsed and performed. Playwrights were allowed to make improvements to their scripts during the rehearsal process.

Religious plays program
Twice a year, New Play Project accepted submissions of religious-themed plays, most of which are LDS. NPP felt it was very important there is a place for Mormon playwrights to write their own religious experiences using their own religious terminology.

== Recognition ==
The goal of New Play Project was to not only create positive, uplifting media for local audiences, but to create great writers who can make a difference in the mass media. In 2007, two NPP writers' works were chosen for Specific Gravity Ensemble's Elevator Plays. SGE was a Louisville, Kentucky–based theater company.

== Development ==
Part of New Play Project's goal was education. They worked to develop new writers, actors, and directors, and hone their skills. They did this both through play writing workshops and through their short play productions.

Writing

Writing was the most important aspect of New Play Project, and its heart new work. NPP welcomed submissions from anyone for their themed productions. If submitted early before deadlines, the directors were willing to give feedback, and even had a workshop program for playwrights trying to develop both their short and full-length scripts.

Acting

Because NPP generally produced short plays, actors sometimes only needed to spend 2–5 hours per week in rehearsal and have a much lower memorization burden than in most plays. No previous acting experience was required, and directors worked with actors to develop good acting skills.

Directing

As with acting, the ten-minute play format provides opportunities for many beginning and experienced directors without the time-consumption of managing and blocking a full-length production. Previous directing or acting experience is required for directors, and NPP generally gives preference to those who have worked on previous NPP production (in any capacity).

Dramaturgy

NPP also included dramaturgs in its productions. In NPP, dramaturgs helped find additional information and images that help the director and actors better understand the script in terms of its larger context. They also created written and visual aids to help audience members connect the script to issues in their own lives and the world around them. Dramaturgs also helped during the script development process to give articulate feedback on scripts to improve them. They were heavily utilized in the play writing workshop program.

== Past shows ==
=== 2006 ===
- Love Songs & Negotiations
- Palms
- In Progress

=== 2007 ===
- A New Leaf
- Beneath the Surface
- That They Might Have Joy
- Really Cool and Smart and Better Than You by Arisael Rivera
- All's Fair
- On the Road
- Roots
- Thorns & Thistles
- America

=== 2008 ===
- Eccentricities
- Lost and Found
- Swallow the Sun by Mahonri Stewart
- Long Ago and Far Away
- Bread of Affliction with BYU experimental theater club
- Fire & Rain
- God for President by Katherine Gee
- Uneaten Cantaloupe by Mahonri Stewart
- Games We Play
- Persuasion (staged reading)

=== 2009 ===
- Do You Love Me?
- Little Happy Secrets by Melissa Leilani Larson
- Reaching
- Bad Play Project
- The Fading Flower
- Mixed Up!
- Fishes in the Sea (staged reading)

=== 2010 ===
- The Bent Sword Musical by Stephen Gashler
- The Best of New Play Project

=== 2011 ===
- He & She Fighting by Eric Samuelson
- WWJD by Anna Lewis

== Out of the Mount ==
In 2010, Davey Morrison edited a collection of NPP's work, Out of the Mount: 19 from New Play Project, published by Peculiar Pages. The book allowed NPP's work to travel outside of Utah; it "ably makes its claim as one of the most ambitious and vibrant going concerns in the world of LDS culture."

== TV and Film ==
To date, there has been one TV web series and one feature-length film released based on plays originally performed as New Play Project productions.

WWJD was a feature-length film released in 2022. Starring William McAllister, Jason Jensen, and Jessamyn Svensson, it was originally filmed in 2012, but was finally released 10 years later. Written by Anna Lewis, it was originally performed as a stage play by NPP in 2011. The only returning cast member from the original play was Thomas Gray. The film was played at the LDS Film Festival in 2022 and won 2nd place in the Audience Choice category.

Adam & Eve was an eight-episode mini-series by Davey Morrison and Bianca Dillard, based on the play by Davey Morrison and released in 2016. Starring Davey Morrison as Adam and Becca Ingram as Eve, the first season (4 episodes) of the series played at several film festivals and received awards nominations.

== See also ==
- Eric Samuelsen
- Melissa Leilani Larson
- James Goldberg
