= My Little Pony: Friendship Is Magic season 7 =

My Little Pony: Friendship Is Magic
- Season 7
- DVD cover
- No. of episodes: 26

Release
- Original network: Discovery Family
- Original release: April 15 – October 28, 2017

Season chronology
- ← Previous; Season 6 Next → Season 8

The seventh season of the animated television series My Little Pony: Friendship Is Magic, developed by Lauren Faust, originally aired on the Discovery Family channel in the United States. The series is based on Hasbro's My Little Pony line of toys and animated works and is often referred by collectors to be the fourth generation, or "G4", of the My Little Pony franchise. Season 7 of the series premiered on April 15, 2017, on Discovery Family, an American pay television channel partly owned by Hasbro, and concluded on October 28, twenty-two days after My Little Pony: The Movie was released in theaters.

== Cast ==
=== Main ===
- Tara Strong as Twilight Sparkle
  - Rebecca Shoichet as Twilight Sparkle (singing voice)
- Tabitha St. Germain as Rarity
  - Kazumi Evans as Rarity (singing voice)
- Ashleigh Ball as Applejack and Rainbow Dash
- Andrea Libman as Fluttershy and Pinkie Pie
  - Shannon Chan-Kent as Pinkie Pie (singing voice)
- Cathy Weseluck as Spike

=== Recurring ===
- Kelly Sheridan as Starlight Glimmer
- Nicole Oliver as Princess Celestia
- Tabitha St. Germain as Princess Luna
- The Cutie Mark Crusaders
  - Michelle Creber as Apple Bloom
  - Madeleine Peters as Scootaloo
  - Claire Corlett as Sweetie Belle

=== Minor ===
==== Single role ====
- John de Lancie as Discord
- Kathleen Barr as Trixie Lulamoon
- Kyle Rideout as Thorax
- Ian Hanlin as Sunburst
- Ali Milner as Princess Ember
- Andrew Francis as Shining Armor
- Britt McKillip as Princess Cadance
- Ingrid Nilson as Maud Pie
- Peter Kelamis as Big Daddy McColt
- Kelly Sheridan as Sassy Saddles
- Kelly Metzger as Spitfire
- Rebecca Shoichet as Sugar Belle
- Garry Chalk as Prince Rutherford
- Chiara Zanni as A.K. Yearling/Daring Do
- Brenda Crichlow as Zecora
- Richard Ian Cox as Mr. Breezy

==== Multiple roles ====
- Michael Dobson as Bulk Biceps and Dr. Caballeron
- Graham Verchere as Chipcutter and Pipsqueak
- Vincent Tong as Garble, Feather Bangs, and Rumble
- Peter New as Big McIntosh and Goldie Delicious
- Tabitha St. Germain as Flurry Heart, Granny Smith, Pound Cake, Zipporwhill, Photo Finish, Pearly Stitch, and Mrs. Cake
- Nicole Oliver as Miss Cheerilee and Dr. Fauna
- Andrea Libman as Pumpkin Cake, Fleetfoot, Lily Lace, and Bon Bon
- Ashleigh Ball as Nurse Redheart, Lyra Heartstrings, and Daisy
- Kazumi Evans as Wrangler and Rose
- Trevor Devall as Hoity Toity, Thunderlane, and Iron Will
- Cathy Weseluck as Mayor Mare and Lily Valley
- Brian Drummond as Filthy Rich, Davenport, and Dr. Horse

=== Guest stars ===
==== Single role ====
- Jason Simpson as Spearhead
- Russell Roberts as Rusty Tenure
- Mark Gibbon as Hard Hat
- Mackenzie Gray as Dandy Grandeur
- Jason Deline as Bow Hothoof
- Sarah Edmondson as Windy Whistles
- Michael Antonakos as Starstreak
- Caitriona Murphy as Inky Rose
- Maggie Blue O'Hara as Strawberry Sunrise
- Tony Alcantar as Mayor of Fillydelphia
- Scott Underwood as Mayor of Baltimare
- William Shatner as Grand Pear
- Felicia Day as Pear Butter
- Bill Mondy as Burnt Oak
- Alyssya Swales as Toola Roola
- Áine Sunderland as Coconut Cream
- Ellen-Ray Hennessy as Mistmane
- Elysia Rotaru as Sable Spirit
- Giles Panton as Flash Magnus
- Paul Dobson as Commander Ironhead
- Janyse Jaud as Mrs. Trotsworth
- Doron Bell as Cattail
- Mariee Devereux as Mage Meadowbrook
- Lili Beaudoin as Kettle Corn
- Patricia Drake as Twilight Velvet
- Charles Demers as Night Light
- Chris Britton as Star Swirl the Bearded
- Murry Peeters as Somnambula
- Matt Cowlrick as Rockhoof
- Kelli Ogmundson as Professor Fossil

==== Multiple roles ====
- Bill Newton as Bright Mac, Pharynx, and the Pony of Shadows/Stygian
- Zach LeBlanc as Skeedaddle and Star Tracker

== Episodes ==
Denny Lu directs each episode, although there are different co-directors.

No. overall	No. in season	Title	Co-directed by	Written by	Original release date	Prod. code	US viewers (millions)
144	1	"Celestial Advice"	Tim Stuby	Joanna Lewis & Kristine Songco	April 15, 2017	701	0.25
Starlight, Trixie, Thorax, and Discord are awarded medals for defeating Queen Chrysalis and bringing harmony to the Changeling Kingdom. During the celebration reception, Discord makes Twilight realize that she has nothing left to teach Starlight, and she turns to Princess Celestia for advice. Twilight considers following Celestia's example by sending Starlight to study away from Ponyville, and she becomes fraught with worry as she shows Celestia various scenarios of Starlight's studies all ending in a disaster. Celestia breaks into laughter and admits that she had the same anxieties over sending Twilight away out of fear of growing distant from her. Twilight feels assured and announces Starlight's graduation to the party goers. To Twilight's joy, Starlight decides to stay in Ponyville until she feels ready to leave.
145	2	"All Bottled Up"	Tim Stuby	Joanna Lewis & Kristine Songco	April 15, 2017	702	0.21
While Twilight and her friends are away on a friendship retreat, Starlight remains at the castle to help Trixie practice her magic. Trixie carelessly uses a teleportation spell on Twilight's map table, sending it to an unknown location. Starlight's rage causes a red cloud of magic to spew from her horn, which she contains in a glass bottle before it causes her to drive Trixie away. During their search for the map, Starlight's anger at Trixie continues to mount until the bottle accidentally breaks and releases the cloud, which infects Granny Smith, Bulk Biceps, and a jeweler pony, and makes them attack Trixie. Starlight is able to dispel the cloud by venting her anger to Trixie, who apologizes and Starlight apologizes for bottling up her anger. They find the map at the spa where they first met, and returns it to the castle just as Twilight and her friends came back.
146	3	"A Flurry of Emotions"	Tim Stuby	Sammie Crowley & Whitney Wetta	April 22, 2017	703	0.22
Shining Armor and Princess Cadance ask Twilight to babysit Flurry Heart while they attend an art show. Twilight gladly accepts the chance to spend time with her niece, despite her commitment to visiting sick foals at the hospital. When Twilight runs late for her appointment, she takes Flurry along to remain on schedule, proving to be too busy to give Flurry necessary attention. This causes Flurry to act out and cause problems everywhere they go, culminating with her wreaking havoc around the hospital while searching for her stuffed snail toy. Twilight scolds and frightens Flurry, but recognizes her negligence towards her niece and apologizes to her. Meanwhile, Shining Armor and Cadance begin to miss Flurry Heart and leave the art show early. They return to the castle to find Twilight spending quality time with her while Spike takes Twilight's place at the hospital. Twilight learns that she should not have agree to watch over her niece with a jam pack schedule and Shining Armor and Cadance learns that they should give Twilight notice ahead of time in case they need her to do foaling duties again.
147	4	"Rock Solid Friendship"	Tim Stuby	Nick Confalone	April 29, 2017	704	N/A
After Maud earns her "rocktorate" in rock science, Pinkie Pie takes her on a tour of Ponyville, hoping she will move in with her. Unimpressed with Ponyville's selection of rocks and minerals, Maud agrees to stay if she can make a friend who understands her passion for rocks. She meets Starlight, and they become fast friends as they unearth a beautiful grotto near Ponyville. However, Pinkie fails to notice their friendship and constantly tries forcing them to get along. Maud becomes annoyed with Pinkie's interference and inconsideration, and decides to move to Ghastly Gorge instead. Starlight scolds Pinkie for her inhospitality, causing her to realize her folly, so she apologizes to Maud for her behavior and selfishness and promises to never interfere again. This convinces Maud to give Ponyville a second chance, where she reunites with Starlight and sets up her new home in the grotto.
148	5	"Fluttershy Leans In"	Tim Stuby	Gillian M. Berrow	May 6, 2017 (Note: This episode aired on April 30, 2017 in Canada (Treehouse TV).)	705	N/A
When Ponyville's animal clinic is overrun with injured animals, Fluttershy decides to help by following her dream of building a wildlife sanctuary. Her friends recommend three experts to assist with the project: Wrangler, an animal handler; Hard Hat, a construction worker; and Dandy Grandeur, an interior decorator. However, each expert disagrees with Fluttershy's vision, and they begin work on a different structure without her consent, which proves to be unfit for the animals. Outraged at the experts for ignoring her directions, Fluttershy sends them away. After her friends apologize on behalf of the experts, she conspires with her friend, Big Daddy McColt, to complete the sanctuary her way, which is named "Sweet Feather Sanctuary".
149	6	"Forever Filly"	Tim Stuby	Michael P. Fox & Wil Fox	May 13, 2017 (Note: This episode aired on May 6, 2017 in Canada (Treehouse TV).)	706	N/A
Rarity feels nostalgic for her sisterly bonding with Sweetie Belle, so she decides to spend the day together with her. However, all of Rarity's planned activities are things Sweetie Belle has outgrown, which she fails to notice. After finally growing annoyed with Rarity and leaving her, Sweetie Belle joins Apple Bloom and Scootaloo in helping another filly, Zipporwhill, reconnect with her pet dog, Ripley who has similarly grown disinterested in playing with her. Sweetie Belle figures out that Zipporwhill has been treating Ripley like a puppy, and encourages her to find new ways to play. Rarity overhears this and apologizes to Sweetie Belle for not thinking about and treating her like her age. They agree to try new activities together.
150	7	"Parental Glideance"	Tim Stuby	Josh Hamilton	May 20, 2017 (Note: This episode aired on May 7, 2017 in Canada (Treehouse TV).)	707	N/A
Scootaloo is assigned to write a school report about her most inspirational hero, so she slingshots herself up to Cloudsdale to interview Rainbow Dash, but instead meets her parents, Bow Hothoof and Windy Whistles, who are just as big fans of their daughter as she is. They are delighted when Scootaloo tells them that Rainbow Dash is now a Wonderbolt, and visit their daughter to cheer for her. However, Rainbow Dash is mortified by her parents' overenthusiastic support, confiding in Scootaloo that she deliberately hid her induction from them for this reason. When her parents begin celebrating every mundane thing she does, Rainbow Dash angrily snaps and sends them away. Shocked and disappointed in her behavior, Scootaloo shows Rainbow Dash her report and helps her realize that her parents' support has built her into the confident and talented pony she is now, and she took them for granted, so she apologizes to her parents by performing a private Wonderbolts show for them to express her newfound appreciation.
151	8	"Hard to Say Anything"	Mike Myhre	Becky Wangberg	May 27, 2017 (Note: This episode aired on May 13, 2017 in Canada (Treehouse TV).)	708	0.19
While Big Mac delivers another load of apples to Starlight’s old village, the Cutie Mark Crusaders stowed away and discovers that he has a crush on Sugar Belle, the unicorn who runs the bakery. They encourage Big Mac to confess his feelings, but he is interrupted by Feather Bangs, a suave stallion who also has affections for Sugar Belle. The Crusaders help Big Mac compete against Feather using grand, romantic gestures, but Sugar Belle is overwhelmed by their advances and rejects them both. The Crusaders decide to help Big Mac prepare a more meaningful gift for Sugar Belle by building her a new display case like she always wanted. Sugar Belle is delighted and accepts Big Mac's feelings, while the Crusaders decide to help Feather find new love with his own admirers.
152	9	"Honest Apple"	Mike Myhre	Kevin Lappin	June 3, 2017 (Note: This episode aired on May 14, 2017 in Canada (Treehouse TV).)	709	N/A
Rarity selects Applejack to serve as a judge for an upcoming fashion show. Applejack accepts, figuring that she simply needs to give her honest opinion. Before the show, Applejack is mystified by the other judges and stylists' fashion sense and criticizes their design choices, telling them her belief that fashion is ridiculous. The offended fashion ponies storm out, forcing the show to be cancelled. When Applejack tries defending her actions by saying that she's giving her honest opinion, Rarity decides to show Applejack how honesty can be hurtful and gives her a taste of her own medicine by taking her to a pony who disregards apples, despite the hard work Applejack and her family put in the apples they make, which makes Applejack realize how mean she was with her hurtful comments about fashion. Gathering the fashion ponies, Applejack apologizes for almost ruining the show with her honesty and manages to get the show uncancelled. When given the deciding vote during the show, Applejack finds new admiration in the stylists' hard work and names all of them the winner.
153	10	"A Royal Problem"	Mike Myhre	Joanna Lewis & Kristine Songco	June 10, 2017 (Note: This episode aired on May 20, 2017 in Canada (Treehouse TV).)	710	0.15
When the map sends Starlight on a friendship mission to Canterlot Castle, she discovers that Princess Celestia and Princess Luna are feuding because they feel unappreciated by each other. When the sisters argue over whose royal duties are more difficult, Starlight casts a spell that temporarily switches their cutie marks and abilities, intending to make them swap roles to change their perspective. They agree to Starlight's idea before quickly discovering their respective hardships: Luna finding it hard to keep up public appearances, and Celestia realizing the loneliness of guarding Equestria at night. While observing her subjects' dreams, Celestia finds Starlight suffering from a nightmare where the sisters' feud has escalated into a battle between Nightmare Moon and Celestia's evil alter-ego, Daybreaker. With both sisters admitting their jobs are equally challenging, Celestia dispels Starlight's nightmare with Luna's support. The sisters finally reconcile, ending their feud.
154	11	"Not Asking for Trouble"	Mike Myhre	May Chan	June 17, 2017 (Note: This episode aired on May 21, 2017 in Canada (Treehouse TV).)	711	N/A
Pinkie Pie is invited to the rustic village of Yakyakistan, where she partakes in the yak holiday of Yikslurbertfest to prove her understanding of yak culture. During their customary stomping ritual, Pinkie and the yaks accidentally cause an avalanche that buries the village in snow, leaving them without food or shelter. Unable to dig the snow away on their own, Pinkie offers to gather her friends to assist the yaks, but Prince Rutherford stubbornly rejects any outside help and chooses to wait for the snow to melt instead. Pinkie disregards Rutherford and rallies her friends to remove the snow while they sleep. Awakening the next morning to find the snow gone, Rutherford and the yaks commend Pinkie for helping them without their asking, and make her an honorary yak.
155	12	"Discordant Harmony"	Mike Myhre	Michael P. Fox & Wil Fox	August 5, 2017	712	N/A
After joining Fluttershy for a tea party, Discord realizes he has never invited her for tea before and takes it upon himself to change himself and his realm to be more normal in appeal to Fluttershy. When Fluttershy arrives, she sees that Discord is fading away, unable to make chaos. She rectifies the situation by creating chaos for him, which helps to restore him to normal. She reminds him that they get along so well because they are so different, and she was hoping to have a tea party under Discord's chaotic setting rather than one like her own.
156	13	"The Perfect Pear"	Mike Myhre	Joanna Lewis & Kristine Songco	August 5, 2017	713	N/A
Apple Bloom encounters a kindly old pear merchant named Grand Pear in the market. When she tells Applejack and Big Mac about it, they tell her about a feud between the Apple and Pear families that Granny Smith refuses to talk about. Visiting Goldie Delicious for more information, the siblings discover that their mother, Buttercup, was Grand Pear's daughter Pear Butter. Through stories told by friends of their parents, the siblings learn about the romance between their mother and their father, Bright Mac, which is complicated by Grand Pear's plans to move away from Ponyville. Bright Mac and Pear Butter hold a secret wedding ceremony that is discovered by their parents as soon as they are married. Pear Butter asserts her place with the Apple family and cuts ties with her father when he refuses to accept their love. In the present, the Apple siblings arrange a meeting between Granny Smith and Grand Pear, allowing their estranged grandparents to apologize to them for hurting the family. After the reconciliation, the family gathers to honor their parents.
157	14	"Fame and Misfortune"	Mike Myhre	M.A. Larson	August 12, 2017	714	N/A
After encountering two feuding fillies, Twilight decides to publish her and her friends' friendship journal to teach ponies the lessons written inside. The journal becomes a success but draws unintended reactions from the readers: Rarity loses popularity for her supposed selfishness; Pinkie Pie is laughed at for her every word; Rainbow Dash is followed by fans who fixate solely on her entries; Fluttershy is criticized for her inconsistent assertiveness; Applejack is swamped by admirers who consider themselves a part of the Apple family; and Twilight is regarded as less interesting due to her princesshood. Confronted by a mob of critics who bicker over which pony is the best, Twilight and her friends try to convince them that their flaws are what make their friendship strong, but the mob only continue to argue. Twilight laments the journal's misinterpretation until Starlight finds the two fillies from before, who tell Twilight that the journal was able to help them become better friends, which satisfies the group, allowing them to embrace.
158	15	"Triple Threat"	Mike Myhre	Josh Hamilton	August 19, 2017	715	N/A
Spike invites Ember to Ponyville for an official friendship meeting, but forgot that he invited Thorax for a get-together on the same day. When both guests arrive, Spike fears they will not get along and decides to keep them separate. After this happens, the map sends Spike on a friendship mission in town, and he begins avoiding Ember and Thorax to find it. Ember confronts Spike for his suspicious behavior, causing Thorax to threaten her in Spike's defense. Spike is forced to reveal his deception to both of his friends, which upsets them. Eventually, they help each other work out their respective leadership problems. In the end, Ember and Thorax become friends and forgive Spike after he apologizes, fulfilling his friendship mission.
159	16	"Campfire Tales"	Mike Myhre	Barry Safchik & Michael Platt	August 26, 2017	716	N/A
While the Cutie Mark Crusaders are starting their annual camping trip with Applejack, Rarity, and Rainbow Dash, a swarm of ravenous fly-ders infest the camp. Taking refuge in a cave, they decide to pass the time by telling folktales about their favorite legendary heroes.: Applejack tells the story of Rockhoof, a scrawny earth pony stallion who magically grew into a big and strong brawny stallion while digging a trench to save his village from a volcanic eruption.; Rarity tells the story of Mistmane, a unicorn sorceress who sacrificed her own beauty to lift a curse of ugliness on her embittered friend who became empress.; Rainbow Dash tells the story of Flash Magnus, a pegasus soldier who bravely fought terrifying dragons with a fireproof shield to rescue his comrades.; After the fly-ders leave, the Crusaders are inspired by the tales to make the best of their camping trip.
160	17	"To Change a Changeling"	Mike Myhre	Kevin Lappin	September 2, 2017	717	N/A
On their way to visit to the Changeling Kingdom, Starlight and Trixie are attacked by Thorax's brother, Pharynx, who refuses to adopt the hive's new, peaceful ways. The other changelings feel uneasy around Pharynx and elect that he should be banished from the hive for his ceaseless bullying. Failing to reason with Pharynx, Starlight and Trixie agree that he must leave, but when they confront Thorax over the issue, he is reluctant because Pharynx would always defend him from being teased by the other changelings. Starlight is inspired to lure a maulwurf, a giant bear-mole creature, to the hive, expecting Pharynx to come to Thorax's rescue, only to find that he has already left willingly. Starlight, Trixie, and Thorax find him fending off the maulwurf to protect the hive, proving that he still cares for the changelings' safety. After working together to defeat the maulwurf, Pharynx is accepted by the other changelings and transforms.
161	18	"Daring Done?"	Mike Myhre	Gillian M. Berrow	September 9, 2017 (Note: This episode was published on YouTube on September 3, 2017.)	718	N/A
Rainbow Dash is distressed when she and Pinkie Pie discover that A.K. Yearling has announced her retirement from writing the Daring Do book series, thus ending her adventures as the titular hero. When they confront her, Yearling explains she has grown disheartened over the collateral damage her heroics have caused in the city of the legendary hero Somnambula, resulting in her being despised by the townsfolk. They take Yearling to make amends, only to discover that Dr. Caballeron has been taking advantage of Daring Do's tarnished reputation to commit thefts and blame them on her. When Rainbow Dash speaks in Daring Do's defense, Caballeron kidnaps her, and lures Daring Do into a trap. Encouraged by Pinkie not to lose hope, Daring Do rescues Rainbow Dash and ends her retirement, regaining public support by exposing Caballeron's deception and using her wealth to repair the city damages.
162	19	"It Isn't the Mane Thing About You"	Mike Myhre	Josh Haber	September 16, 2017	719	N/A
While Rarity prepares for an important photo shoot, she gets her mane ruined by Pinkie Pie's sticky party string. Zecora gives a specially made shampoo to Rarity, but she accidentally takes a remover potion intended for Pinkie's mess instead and loses most of her mane. While Zecora works on a remedy, Rarity is devastated when other ponies fail to notice her as she hides her mane out of shame. Zecora later tells Rarity that a magical fix for her mane is impossible, and her friends cannot make her a suitable wig in time, so she reluctantly cancels the shoot. Reminded by her friends that her mane does not define who she is, Rarity refashions her thinned mane into a punk-inspired look and confidently returns to her daily routine. Months later, after Rarity's mane grew back, she is delighted to discover that her friends had arranged a paparazzi shoot with her in her punk style, starting a new fashion trend.
163	20	"A Health of Information"	Mike Myhre	Sammie Crowley & Whitney Wetta	September 23, 2017	720	N/A
While helping Fluttershy gather supplies in a swamp, Zecora contracts a disease called swamp fever that threatens to eventually turn her into a tree, for which no cure is known. Holding herself responsible for Zecora's condition, Fluttershy vows to heal her as quickly as possible. After much sleepless research, Fluttershy finds a special honey first discovered by her legendary idol, Mage Meadowbrook. By this time, Fluttershy contracts swamp fever as well, but continues to push herself for Zecora's sake until she passes out due to extreme exhaustion during a confrontation with the flash bees. Fluttershy reflects that her careless determination has only endangered Zecora, so she enacts a careful plan to extract the honey using Meadowbrook's mask as a disguise. After successfully treating Zecora and herself, Fluttershy apologizes for her impulsiveness, and has learned to do things carefully and logically.
164	21	"Marks and Recreation"	Mike Myhre	May Chan	September 30, 2017	721	N/A
The Cutie Mark Crusaders open a day camp where "blank flank" foals may try new activities and discover their special talents. Rumble, the younger brother of Wonderbolt Thunderlane, refuses to participate and reveals his desire to remain a blank flank, as he is convinced that cutie marks limit ponies to only performing their talents. He quickly rallies the other campers to his side, splitting off into a new camp where they avoid doing anything that would produce a cutie mark, which quickly bores the campers. The Crusaders learn from Thunderlane that Rumble does not fear being labeled, but rather getting a cutie mark that could potentially keep him from achieving his dream of becoming a Wonderbolt. They invite Thunderlane to participate in the camp's activities with the campers and prove how he excels in other things besides flying, helping Rumble overcome his fear of trying different things.
165	22	"Once Upon a Zeppelin"	Mike Myhre	Brittany Jo Flores	October 7, 2017	722	N/A
Twilight learns that her parents have won a free zeppelin cruise and joins them to take a break from her royal duties. Shortly upon boarding, Twilight discovers the cruise to be a themed vacation experience hosted by Iron Will where the other passengers pay to spend time with her, invading her family's privacy. Not wanting to disappoint anypony, Twilight agrees to personally attend to the passengers so the rest of her family can enjoy their planned activities. In doing so, however, she misses a rare celestial event she had planned to see and is heartbroken, and she hurts Star Tracker, a colt who won a day of being an honorary member of her family, in the process. Cadance consoles Twilight, telling her the importance of setting time aside for herself. After Twilight apologizes to the passengers and Star Tracker, they agree to respect her boundaries and turn against Iron Will for manipulating them and almost ruining their time together, forcing him to abandon the cruise and allowing Twilight to spend the rest of her vacation in peace with her family.
166	23	"Secrets and Pies"	Mike Myhre	Josh Hamilton	October 14, 2017	723	N/A
Pinkie Pie has been giving homemade pies to Rainbow Dash for years and is shocked to find that she has apparently thrown her latest one away. After investigating around Ponyville and Wonderbolt headquarters, Pinkie realizes that Rainbow Dash has never actually eaten any of her pies and has been lying about enjoying them. After several attempts to get Rainbow Dash to eat a pie, Pinkie finally catches her getting rid of one and publicly accuses her of deception. Rainbow Dash admits to Twilight and Applejack that she dislikes all pies, and has only been lying to spare Pinkie's feelings, but they tell her that she did hurt her. Rainbow Dash bakes a huge, disgusting pie and prepares to eat it in front of Pinkie as an apology, but Pinkie forgives her before she can finish, now understanding the lengths to which Rainbow Dash would go to make her happy. She tells Rainbow Dash that in the future, she can always be honest with her, no matter what.
167	24	"Uncommon Bond"	Mike Myhre	Josh Haber & Kevin Lappin	October 21, 2017 (Note: This episode aired on October 15, 2017 in Canada (Treehouse TV).)	724	N/A
Sunburst comes to visit Ponyville, exciting Starlight with the opportunity to spend time with him for the first time since their childhood. To her dismay, Sunburst has little interest in their old activities and finds more in common with her other friends, bonding with Twilight over antiquing, Trixie over stage magic, and Maud over geology. Starlight attempts to reach out to him through their shared interest in magic by casting a spell to recreate their childhood, but her effort only makes Sunburst feel uncomfortable, convincing Starlight that they have nothing in common anymore. After Sunburst fails to find what he and Starlight still have in common, he decides to make it up to her by creating a new variation of their favorite board game, showing her that they can still enjoy each other's company without common interests. With their friendship reaffirmed, Sunburst leaves Ponyville with an antique barrel containing a journal marked with Star Swirl the Bearded's insignia.
168	25	"Shadow Play" (Parts 1 & 2)	Mike Myhre	Story by : Josh Haber; Teleplay by : Josh Haber & Nicole Dubuc (Note: Josh Haber was credited as the sole writer during this episode's early airing in Canada. During the original airing on Discovery Family and on subsequent airings, the credit was to both Josh Haber and Nicole Dubuc.)	October 28, 2017 (Note: This episode aired on October 21, 2017 in Canada (Treehouse TV).)	725	N/A
169	26	"Shadow Play" (Parts 1 & 2)	Mike Myhre	Story by : Josh Haber; Teleplay by : Josh Haber & Nicole Dubuc	October 28, 2017	726	N/A
Part 1: Sunburst shares his discovery of Star Swirl the Bearded's journal with Twilight and her friends, which reveals how the sorcerer and Equestria's other legendary heroes, known as the Pillars of Old Equestria, sacrificed themselves to defeat the Pony of Shadows a thousand years ago. While researching the six heroes' disappearance, Twilight and the group deduce that the Pillars are still alive in limbo, where they have imprisoned themselves alongside the Pony of Shadows for the past millennium. Against Starlight's reservations, Twilight is convinced that freeing Star Swirl would benefit Equestria with his knowledge. To do this, each of Twilight's friends obtains one of the Pillars' artifacts scattered across the land and gathers them to the site of the sealing ritual. Although they succeed in releasing the Pillars, doing so inadvertently brings the Pony of Shadows back as well. Part 2: With his newfound freedom, the Pony of Shadows retreats to the darkest corners of Equestria to recover his lost strength. Scolded by Star Swirl for breaking his spell, Twilight resolves to redeem herself by helping him and the Pillars return the Pony of Shadows to limbo, this time by sacrificing the Elements of Harmony in their place. The map directs them to the monster's location in the Hollow Shades, but Starlight believes this is a friendship problem and learns from the Pillars that the Pony of Shadows was once their friend named Stygian, whom they cast out for attempting to steal their artifacts. When the group arrives at the Hollow Shades, they use the Elements on the Pony of Shadows, but Twilight and Starlight see Stygian and reach out to him, learning that his supposed betrayal was actually an attempt to help the Pillars protect Equestria. The Pillars realize their mistake and help Twilight and her friends use the Elements to separate Stygian from the shadow entity, which is reimprisoned. Star Swirl apologizes for all the trouble he caused with his arrogance. With their friendship restored, Stygian and the Pillars remain in the present era to explore Equestria.

== DVD release ==
My Little Pony: Friendship Is Magic: Season Seven
Set details	Special features
26 episodes; 4-disc set; 16:9 aspect ratio; Subtitles: English	2017 San Diego Comic Con Panel; Sing-Alongs ("Best Friends Until the End of Time", "You're in My Head Like a Catchy Song" and "Flawless")
Release dates
Region 1
October 9, 2018
