= Douglas Holgate =

Australian illustrator

- Occupations: Illustrator, comic book artist
- Notable work: The Last Kids on Earth

Douglas Holgate is an Australian freelance illustrator and comic book artist, best known for illustrating The Last Kids on Earth series by Max Brallier. He has been a freelance comic book artist and illustrator based in Melbourne, Australia, for more than ten years.
