= The Perfect Pear =

- My Little Pony: Friendship Is Magic episode
- Pear Butter (left) and Bright Mac (right) stand in front of their carved rock.
- Episode no.: Season 7 Episode 13
- Directed by: Denny Lu; Mike Myhre
- Written by: Joanna Lewis; Kristine Songco
- Original air dates: June 21, 2017 (Australia); August 5, 2017 (United States)
- Running time: 22 minutes

Guest appearances
- Bill Newton as Bright Mac; Felicia Day as Pear Butter; William Shatner as Grand Pear

Episode chronology
← Previous "Discordant Harmony"	Next → "Fame and Misfortune"
- My Little Pony: Friendship Is Magic (season 7)

"The Perfect Pear" is the thirteenth episode of the seventh season of animated television series My Little Pony: Friendship Is Magic as well as the one hundred and fifty sixth overall. Written by Joanna Lewis and Kristine Songco, and directed by Denny Lu and Mike Myhre, the episode saw the guest-starring of William Shatner and Felicia Day. The plot of the episode centers around Applejack, Big McIntosh and Apple Bloom, who find out how their now deceased parents met and gather information about their extensive background. "The Perfect Pear" was released early on June 21, 2017, in Australia, before being released on August 5, in the United States. The episode received praise from critics and the show's fanbase.

== Plot ==
Apple Bloom encounters a kind old pear merchant named Grand Pear while walking through the busy Ponyville marketplace. Grand Pear explains that he moved from Vanhoover back to Ponyville, and gives her a jar of pear jam for free. When Apple Bloom comes home with pear jam, Applejack and Big McIntosh start to panic and immediately try to hide it. They tell Apple Bloom that there is a feud between the Apple and Pear families and that Granny Smith refuses to talk about it.

In fear of Granny Smith becoming upset, the Apple siblings visit Goldie Delicious for more information. Goldie explains that a long time ago, the Apple and Pear families lived near each other and were constantly arguing about who was the better farmer, especially Granny Smith and Grand Pear. Despite this, the daughter of Grand Pear, Pear Butter, and the son of Granny Smith, Bright Mac, got along well and eventually fell in love. Applejack is shocked, as she realises that the ponies in the story are actually her and her sibling’s now dead parents. Goldie says that she can't tell them more, and tells them to talk with their father's friend, Burnt Oak.

Visiting Burnt Oak, the Apple siblings learn that their father was an honest pony. They later visit their mother's friend, Mrs. Cup Cake, who tells them that their mother convinced her to pursue baking. However, Grand Pear decided to move from Ponyville to Vanhoover in order to expand his business and move away from the Apple family. In response to this, Bright Mac and Pear Butter held a secret wedding ceremony that was discovered by their parents as soon as they were married. Pear Butter asserted her place with the Apple family and was abandoned by her father when he refused to accept their love.

After hearing the story of their parents, the Apple siblings arrange a meeting between Granny Smith and a now remorseful Grand Pear, allowing them to make up. After the reconciliation, the family gathers to honour their late parents at the tree that grew from two seeds planted by the late parents on their wedding night.

== Production and promotion ==
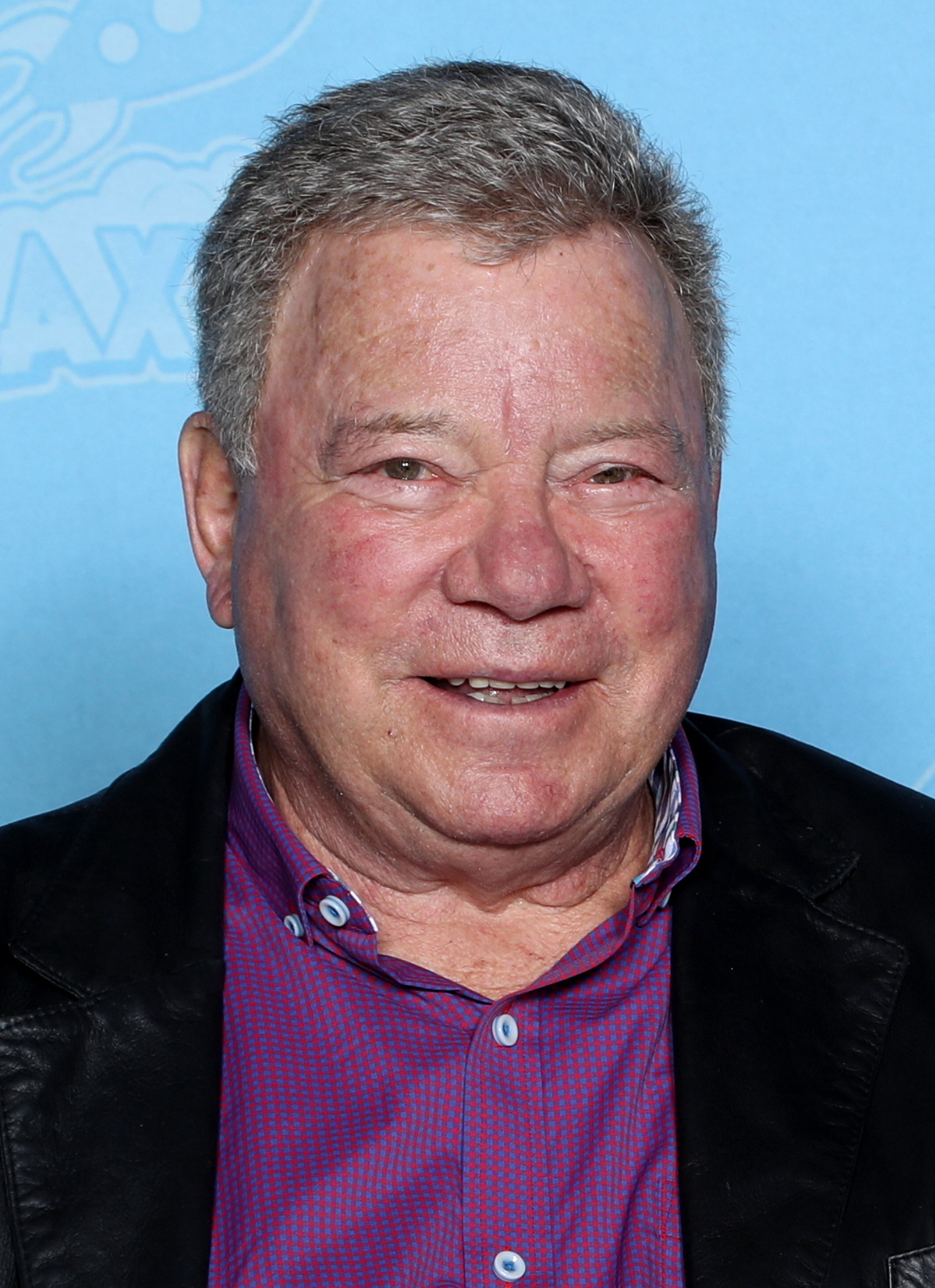
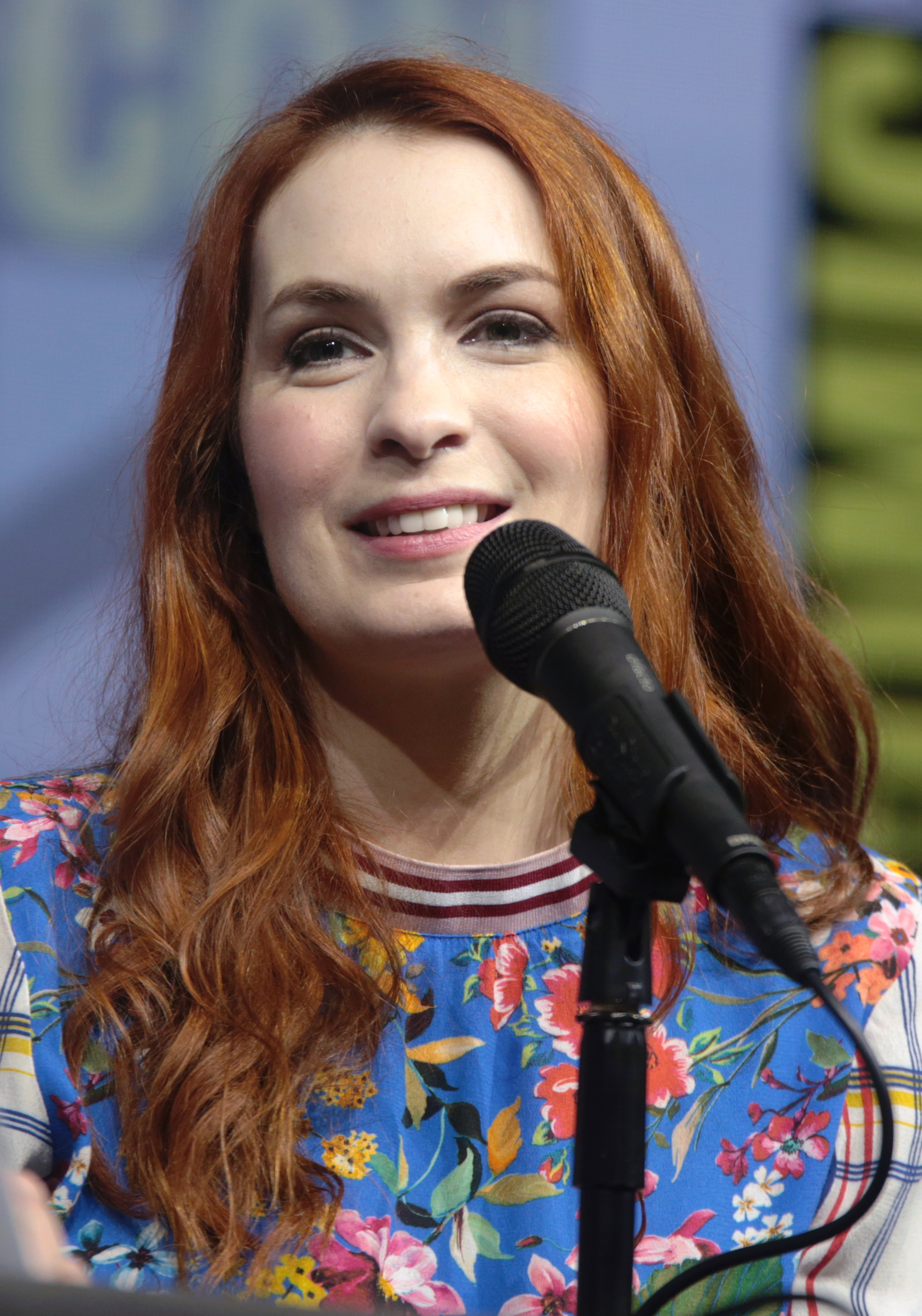
William Shatner (left) and Felicia Day (right) guest-starred in the episode

In the episode, William Shatner, who played James T. Kirk in the Star Trek franchise, and Felicia Day, who played Charlie Bradbury in Supernatural, guest-starred to voice Grand Pear and Pear Butter respectively. Shatner had previously revealed that he was a "brony", an enjoyer of the show, in January 2017. Bright Mac was voiced by Australian actor Bill Newton. In a Twitter post after the series finale, writer Michael Vogel explained that the feud between the Apple and Pear family came from a long-running joke among the show's staff "that Applejack should have a nemesis named Pear Steve".

An animatic of the episode featuring Bright Mac and Pear Butter was shown in the Hasbro Toy Fair 2017. The involvement of William Shatner and Felicia Day was announced on March 15, 2017, together with an announcement about the season seven premiere. Shatner had already teased his involvement in the show with a tweet made a month prior to the announcement. A day before the broadcast, on August 4, 2017, Yahoo released a preview of the episode.

== Broadcast and reception ==
The episode aired early on Australia's Boomerang on June 21, 2017. On August 5, 2017, preceded by "Discordant Harmony", the episode aired on Discovery Family. The episode was not viewed enough to be included in the Top 150 ratings of the day, and so the exact number of viewers is not known.

The episode received some critical acclaim. Screen Rant ranked the episode best of the entire series according to IMDb, with a rating of 9.5 out of 10. Carly Olsen from the same website listed Bright Mac and Pear Butter as the tenth best pairing of the show, calling it a "Romeo and Juliet-type romance, [...] with a slightly happier ending." The episode also received positive comments from the show's fanbase. According to a poll by fan-website Equestria Daily, "The Perfect Pear" was the most liked episode of season seven among fans.

== Home media ==
The episode is part of the "Hearts and Hooves" Region 1 DVD by Shout! Factory which was made available in stores on January 1, 2019. It was also available complete Season 7 DVD Set released on October 9, 2018.
