= The Church of Jesus Christ of Latter-day Saints in India =

LDS Church in India

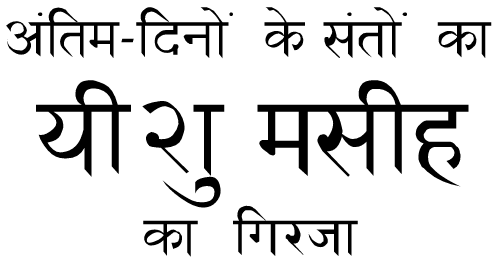
- (Logo in Hindi)

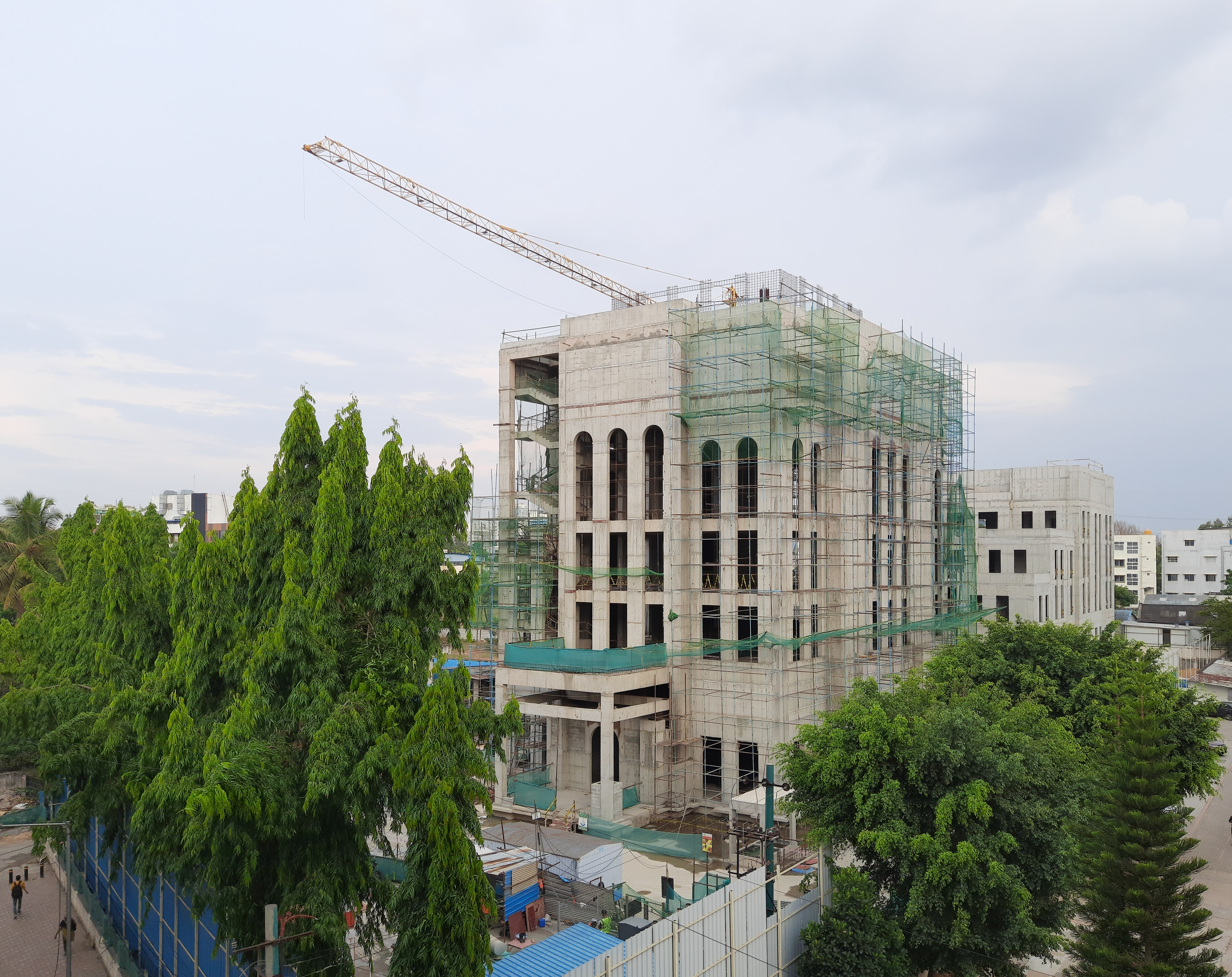
- The Bengaluru India Temple under construction
- Area: Asia
- Members: 15,664 (2025)
- Stakes: 4
- Districts: 3
- Wards: 21
- Branches: 26
- Total congregations: 47
- Missions: 2
- Temples: 1 under construction
- FamilySearch Centers: 22

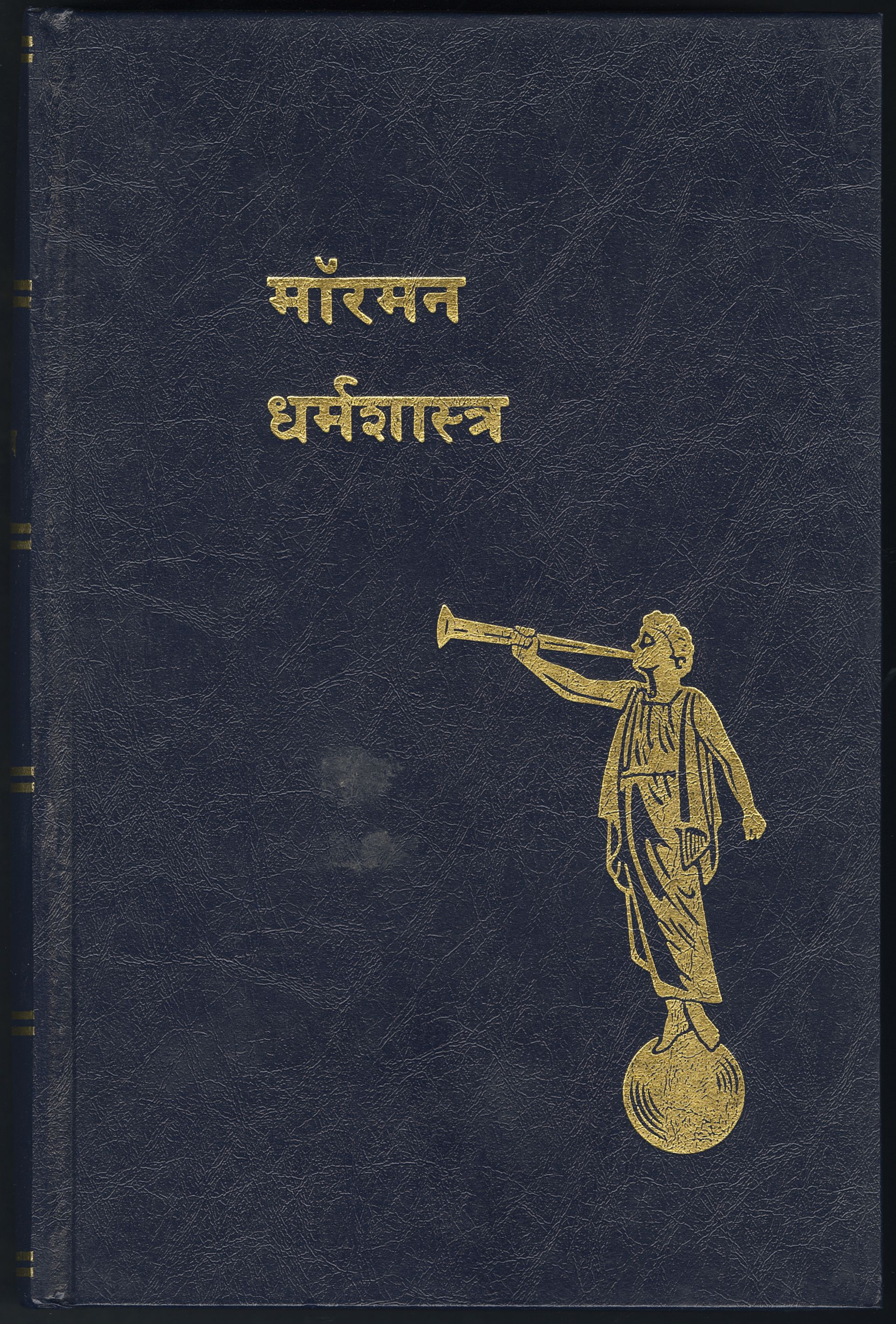
The Book of Mormon in Hindi.

The Church of Jesus Christ of Latter-day Saints (LDS Church) has been present in India since the 19th century. As of 2019, there were local members, missionaries and multiple meetinghouses of the LDS Church in the country. The church stated in 2025, that there are 15,664 members from India.

== History ==
Membership In India
Year	Membership
1977	189
1979	215
1989*	800
1999	2,435
2009	8,289
2019	14,528
2025	15,664
*Published as a rounded number Source: Jim M. Wall, Deseret News, various years, Church Almanac Country Information: India, Windall J. Ashton

Joseph Richards introduced the LDS Church to India in 1851, when he arrived in Calcutta. A small branch was organized in Calcutta, but most of the members migrated to the United States. As per the church's policy, all members were invited to gather in one place, the main reason being that they wanted to build the church and strengthen the priesthood leadership. Though many members of the branch migrated to the US, a small group of members continued to have meetings in Calcutta, which still exists there even today.

In the church's history in India, there were early missionaries who visited Madras (present day Chennai), Bombay (preset day Mumbai), and other places in India, who spread their religion. In fact, there were missionaries visiting Taj Mahal in Agra and teaching the tourists, which was filmed in one of the videos, "The Ancient America Speaks," produced by the church in 1974. There were many events in church history in Coimbatore, Tamil Nadu, India. The golden history started in 1963 at Coimbatore. This was revealed by John Aki, then president of the Hong Kong China Temple during the year 2011. Some of the first families were sealed in the Hong Kong China Temple by Anthony D. Perkins, a general authority who was the president of the church's Asia Area at that time. Perkins anticipated that church membership in that part of India would grow. The movement increased in India by 1993, when missionaries began proselytizing in Bangalore.

By the beginning of 2000, there were 2,435 members in four districts and eighteen branches, and in 2005, there were 5,951. The church holds All India Young Single Adults (YSA) conferences with the goal of helping young members of the church find a spouse.

By 2013, there were about 10,000 members of the LDS Church in India. This number rose to 15,454 in 2024.

During the church's April 2018 general conference, church president Russell M. Nelson announced that a temple would be built in Bengaluru, India. This was one of seven new temples announced at the time, and the first to be built in India.

On December 2, 2020, the groundbreaking ceremony was done, in order to signify the beginning of construction of the Bengaluru India Temple by Robert K. William, a native of India serving as an area seventy.

== Stakes & districts ==
Stake Centers in India (November 2025)
Green = Stake
Orange = District
Purple = meetinghouse not part of stake or district

As of November 2025, the following stakes and districts were located in India:

Stake/District	Organized	Mission
Bengaluru India Stake	12 Dec 1980	India Bengaluru
Chennai India District	11 Oct 2009	India Bengaluru
Coimbatore India District	11 Oct 2009	India Bengaluru
Hyderabad India Stake	1 Mar 1988	India Bengaluru
New Delhi India Stake	19 Aug 1986	India New Delhi
Rajahmundry India Stake	20 Mar 2011	India New Delhi
Visakhapatnam India District	11 Oct 2009	India New Delhi

In addition to these stakes & districts, branches with meetinghouses that are not part of a stake or district are located in Dehradun, Goa, Kolkata and Mumbai and are part of the India New Delhi Mission. The India South Branch (Located in the India Bengaluru Mission) and the India New Delhi Dispersed Members Unit serves individuals and families not in proximity to a church meetinghouse.

== Missions ==
Mission	Organized
India Bengaluru Mission	1 Jan 1993
India New Delhi Mission	1 Nov 2007

The India Bengaluru Mission covers Southern India, the Maldives, and British Indian Ocean Territory. India New Delhi Mission covers Northern India, Bangladesh, and Nepal.

== Temples ==
India was included in the Bangkok Thailand Temple upon its completion on 22 October 2023. On 1 April 2018, the Bengaluru India Temple was announced to be constructed, and ground was broken in December 2020. In addition to the temple, a two-level meetinghouse, administrative offices, a distribution center, and a patron housing facility will be built on the site.

236. Bengaluru India Temple (Under construction); Official website; News & images	
Location: Announced: Groundbreaking: Size: Notes:	Bengaluru, India; 1 April 2018 by Russell M. Nelson; 2 December 2020 by Robert K. William; 38,670 sq ft (3,593 m^{2}) on a 1.62-acre (0.66 ha) site A two-level meetinghouse, administrative offices, a distribution center, and a patron housing facility will also be built on the site.

== See also ==
- Christianity in India

== Additional reading ==
- Britsch, R. Lanier (1998), From the East: The History of the Latter-day Saints in Asia, 1851-1996, Salt Lake City: Deseret Book, pp. 8–33, 506–55, ISBN 1573452688, OCLC 37606249.
