= Bengaluru India Temple =

Mormon temple in India

- Under construction
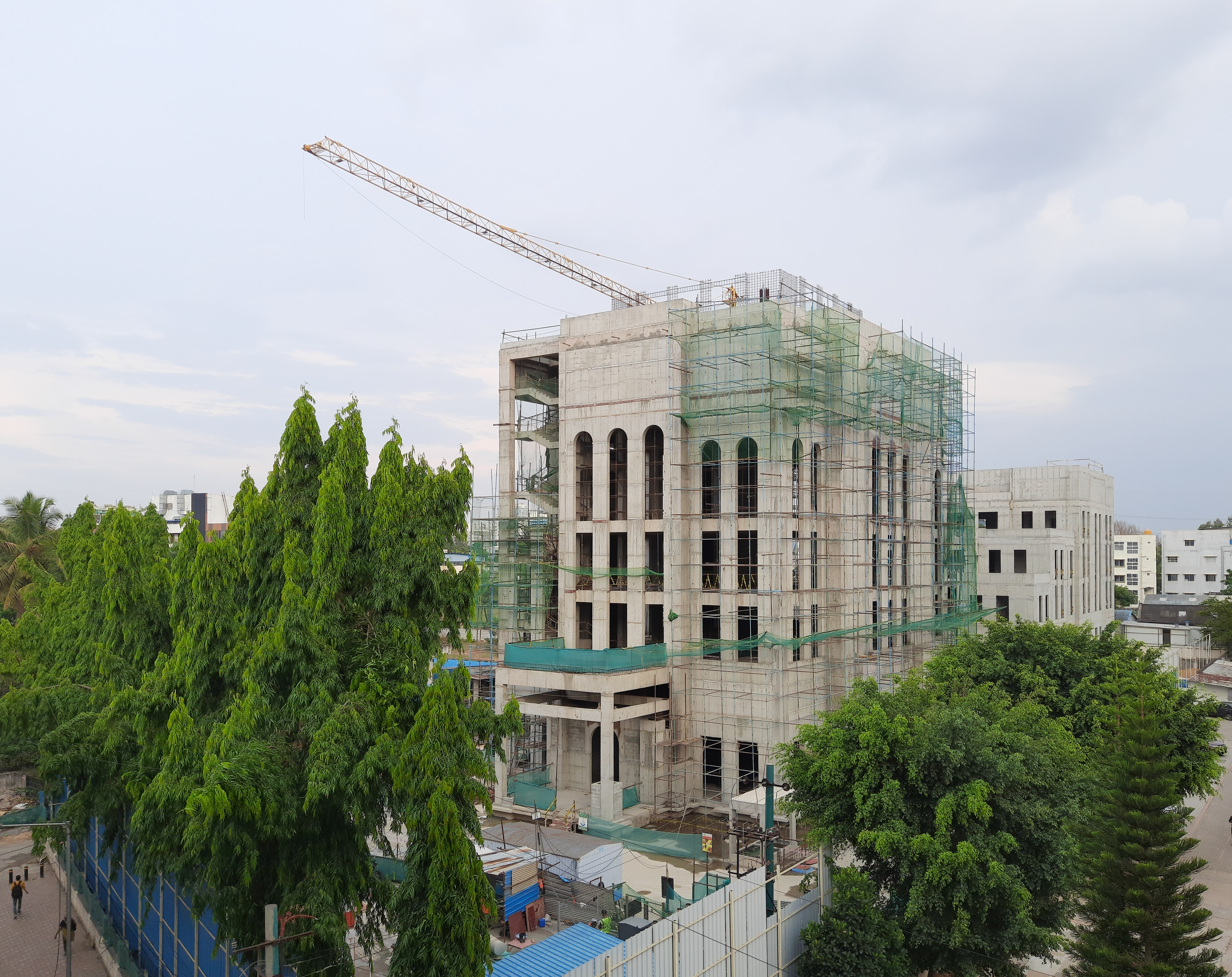
- The temple under construction as of May 2024
- Interactive map of Bengaluru India Temple
- Number: 234
- Site: 1.62 acres (0.66 ha)
- Floor area: 38,670 ft^{2} (3,593 m^{2})
- Official website • News & images

Additional information
- Announced: 1 April 2018, by Russell M. Nelson
- Groundbreaking: 2 December 2020, by Robert K. William
- Location: Bengaluru, India
- Coordinates: 12°59′32″N 77°42′17″E
- Notes: A two-level meetinghouse, administrative offices, a distribution center, and a patron housing facility will also be built on the site.

The Bengaluru India Temple is a temple of the Church of Jesus Christ of Latter-day Saints under construction in Bengaluru, Karnataka, India. It will be the church's first temple in India. The intent to construct the temple was announced on April 1, 2018, by church president Russell M. Nelson during general conference. Located on a 1.62-acre site in the Whitefield area of Bengaluru, the temple complex will include the 38,670-square-foot temple, a two-level meetinghouse, administrative offices, a distribution center, and housing for patron use. The rendering depicts a white structure with tall arched windows and five spires, centered around a taller main spire.

Ground was broken for the temple on December 2, 2020, with area seventy Robert K. William presiding. Attendance was limited due to COVID-19 restrictions. As of 2025, construction continues, with open house and dedication dates yet to be announced. When completed, it is expected to serve nearly 15,000 church members across India, reducing the need for members to travel abroad to attend temple worship.

== History ==
The temple was announced by church president Russell M. Nelson on April 1, 2018, during general conference, along with six other locations. In the same month, Nelson traveled to Bengaluru during his global ministry tour, where he told Latter-day Saints that the decision to include a temple in India had come the night before conference: “The Lord told me on the eve of conference: ‘Announce a temple in India.’”.

The temple announcement in 2018 was notable in India, marking the first time a Latter-day Saint temple was planned for the country. During church president Russell M. Nelson’s 2018 visit to Bengaluru, he visited potential sites, and discussed the temple with church members and missionaries.

On January 15, 2020, the church released the temple’s site location and exterior rendering. Plans called for a 38,670-square-foot structure on a 1.62-acre parcel at 2-B, Garudachar Palya, Mahadevapura, Bengaluru, in the Whitefield district. The temple’s design has a white exterior, arched windows, and five spires—a tall central spire flanked by four smaller ones. It will be approximately 38,670 square feet. The temple campus was designed to include a two-level meetinghouse, administrative offices, a distribution center, and patron housing. At the time, existing church offices and a meetinghouse on the property were removed to make space for the temple complex.

The groundbreaking ceremony took place on December 2, 2020, and was presided over by Robert K. William, an area seventy. Attendance was limited due to COVID-19 restrictions, and a broadcast of the event was shared with members throughout India. In the dedicatory prayer, William expressed comfort for those who had lost loved ones to COVID-19 and emphasized the temple’s role in eternal family doctrine.

At the time of the groundbreaking, the church reported 14,528 members in 46 congregations in India. Church leaders anticipated the temple would serve nearly 15,000 members across the country, marking a milestone in the church’s growth in South Asia.

As of August 27, 2025, the temple remains under construction, with no open house or dedication dates announced.

== Temple leadership and admittance ==
The church's temples are directed by a temple president and matron, each typically serving for a term of three years. The president and matron oversee the administration of temple operations and provide guidance and training for both temple patrons and staff. A president and matron have yet to be announced.

Like all the church's temples, it is not used for Sunday worship services. To members of the church, temples are regarded as sacred houses of the Lord. Once dedicated, only church members with a current temple recommend can enter for worship.

== See also ==
- The Church of Jesus Christ of Latter-day Saints in India
- Comparison of temples of The Church of Jesus Christ of Latter-day Saints
- List of temples of The Church of Jesus Christ of Latter-day Saints
- List of temples of The Church of Jesus Christ of Latter-day Saints by geographic region
- Temple architecture (Latter-day Saints)
