= Garudacharpalya =

- Neighbourhood
- Location in Bangalore, India
- Coordinates: 12.993826°N 77.701792°E
- Country: India
- State: Karnataka
- District: Bangalore
- Metro: Bangalore

Languages
  - Official: Kannada
- Time zone: UTC+5:30 (IST)

Garudacharpalya is a locality in the eastern part of Bangalore, India. It is located along the Whitefield road (ITPL Main road). It is part of the Mahadevapura Assembly constituency.

As per BBMP 2015 electoral rolls, there are 36154 voters in Ward No. 82 (which encompasses Garudacharpalya), of whom 20,317 were male, 15,823 were female, and 14 of the third gender.

== Metro Station ==
As part of the Phase II extension plan of the Purple Line (Namma Metro), Garudacharpalya will also have a Metro Station.

== Important spots of the locality ==
- Fire Station
- ITI Industrial Estate
- Decathlon
- Phoenix Market City
- Godrej United
- Brigade Metropolis
- Purva Parkridge
- ABB
- VST Tractors
- Goushala - This is a shelter for cows, buffaloes and even camels
