= Jeffrey Scott Savage =

American writer (born 1963)

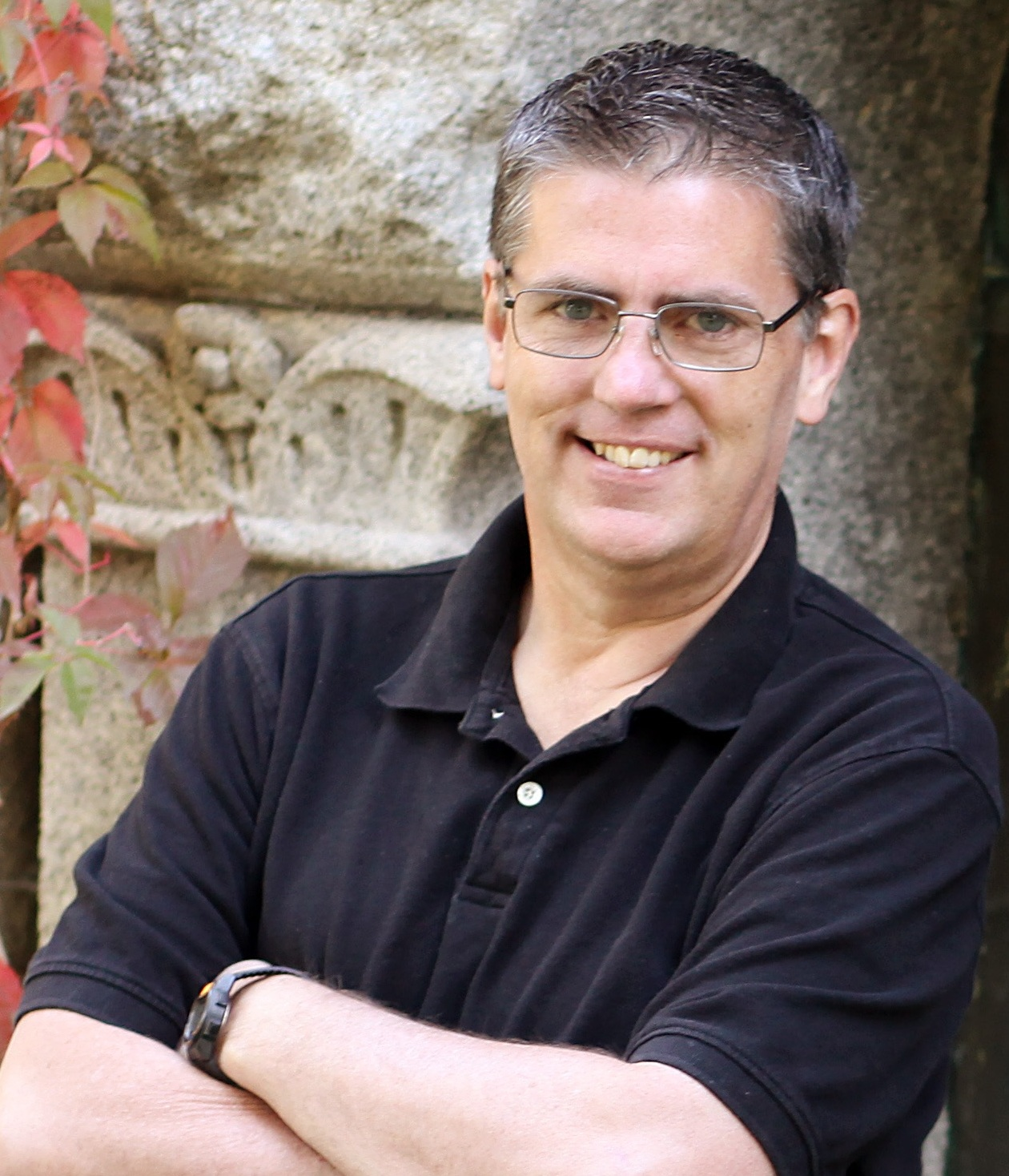
- Savage in 2012
- Born: January 31, 1963 (age 63); Oakland, California, U.S.
- Education: Sierra College; West Valley College; Utah Valley University
- Occupation: Author
- Spouse: Jennifer Savage
- Children: 4
- Writing career
- Pen name: J. Scott Savage; Jeffrey S. Savage
- Period: 2001–present
- Genres: Middle grade fiction Fantasy
- Notable works: Water Keep; Land Keep; Zombie Kid; Dark Memories
- Website: JScottSavage.com; JeffreySavage.com

Jeffrey Scott Savage (born January 31, 1963) is an American author of fantasy, horror, mystery, and suspense. As of 2020, he has published 19 novels, including the FarWorld fantasy series, the Case File 13 series, the Mysteries of Cove series, and the Shandra Covington series, as well as several stand-alone titles. Savage was born and raised in northern California and studied computer science at Sierra College and West Valley College in California and Utah Valley University in Utah. He worked in the software industry before deciding to write full-time. He writes middle grade and young adult fiction under the pen name J. Scott Savage and works intended for adult readers as Jeffrey S. Savage. He won the 2013 Whitney Award for Best Speculative Novel for Dark Memories.

== Early life ==
Jeffrey Scott Savage was born in Oakland, California, on January 31, 1963. He grew up in northern California, and enjoyed readings books such as A Wrinkle in Time, The Outsiders, and The Lord of the Rings. Savage has said that he was "the kid who would cut school and go to the library." Savage would make up stories to tell to his cousins during his childhood years. One of his first storytelling memories took place while fishing in the Sierra Nevada mountains, when he made up a tale about "a superhero hot dog known as Capt. Weenie and his arch villain, a little purple man" that his relatives loved. In high school, Savage wrote a story for his final project in psychology class instead of completing the suggested assignment, but earned an A.

Savage attended Sierra College, West Valley College, and Utah Valley University, studying computer science. During the Great Recession, he lost his job in a software company. Though he was offered another job in the software industry, Savage decided to write full-time and be an author.

== Career ==
At the most base level, I write because it makes me happy. It's like a spigot I can open up to release all the creativity that has been building up inside my brain. But I also write because there's a specific story I need to tell. —J. Scott Savage

=== Middle grade fiction ===
Savage originally decided to write middle grade fantasy after an idea kept him awake one night. After writing for five hours, he felt convinced that he could write for children. He has said that he enjoys writing for middle grade readers because "between the ages of 8-13, everything around you is magic." He wrote the middle-grade fantasy series FarWorld, comprising Water Keep (2008), Land Keep (2009), Air Keep (2013), and Fire Keep (2015). The series follows the fantastical adventures of Marcus, a boy in a wheelchair who dreams of a magical world that is actually a reality, and Kyja, a girl who can't perform magic like everyone else around her. Savage visited over 300 schools to promote Water Keep after its release. Sharon Haddock at Deseret News mentioned that Air Keep "requires suspension of reality" but was "fine for its audience."

On December 26, 2012, Savage's first book in the Case File 13 series, titled Zombie Kid, was released. The series follows a group of kids who love Halloween and all things spooky who encounter zombies, mad scientists, and curses. Kirkus Reviews wrote that the book was "the perfect balance between rib-tickling humor and bone-chilling adventure". Kirkus later called Zombie Kid's sequel, Making the Team (2013), "another thoroughly satisfying thrill ride." The Case File 13 series expanded to include Evil Twins (2014) and Curse of the Mummy's Uncle (2015).

His idea for Fires of Invention originated from the mechanical dragon that appears in the musical Wicked. The novel follows two thirteen-year-old characters as they undertake a secret project to build a mechanical dragon in a town where creativity is against the law. It was a 2015 AML Award finalist in the middle grade novel category. Savage expanded Fires of Invention into his Mysteries of Cove series with Gears of Revolution (2016) and Embers of Destruction (2017). John Carlisle for the Deseret News called Gears of Revolution "an inspiring piece of literature for the middle-grade reader." Both Fires of Invention and Fire Keep (part of the Farworld series) were Whitney Award finalists in 2015. In 2020, Savage released The Lost Wonderland Diaries, a book about two kids who discover Lewis Carroll's long-forgotten diaries documenting his trip to Wonderland.

Savage has visited multiple elementary schools, speaking to kids about the main themes of his books and story writing techniques. Of his school visits, Savage said that he usually leaves teachers with a creative writing exercise to use in the classroom. Savage has also participated in the Writing and Illustrating for Young Readers Workshop.

=== Adult fiction ===
Savage has also authored additional works under the name Jeffrey S. Savage, the majority of which are mystery or suspense novels for adults. They include Cutting Edge (2001), Into the Fire (2002), House of Secrets (2005), Dead on Arrival (2006), A Time to Die (2010), The Fourth Nephite (2010), and Dark Memories (2013). The "techno-thriller" Cutting Edge, Savage's debut novel, follows a Latter-day Saint (LDS) programmer from Utah whose new job in Silicon Valley turns out to be more dangerous than expected. House of Secrets, Dead on Arrival, and Time to Die are the three books that compose his Shandra Covington mystery series. In a review for Meridian Magazine, Jennie Hansen applauded Savage's ability to write from the perspective of a female main character in his Shandra Covington series. Savage's The Fourth Nephite is a Mormon fiction novel about a boy who finds himself in Palmyra, New York in 1827 and encounters Joseph Smith as he tries to protect the golden plates from robbers. In an article about The Fourth Nephite, the Deseret News reported that "Savage said combining fantasy elements and the LDS Church into a novel is a tricky process, but he is satisfied with the result of his efforts."

Savage first began drafting Dark Memories while he was working as a CEO during his many hours travelling. Dark Memories was the first novel in the horror genre to be published by an LDS publishing house. Kirk Shaw, an editor at Covenant Communications, encouraged Savage to send in his manuscript for Dark Memories, even though the company had never published a horror novel before. Covenant agreed to publish Dark Memories. Savage fought to preserve the novel's more horrific elements as it went through the editing process, though he learned how to "let the scary stuff happen in the reader's head," imitating the style of filmmaker Alfred Hitchcock. He described Dark Memories as "a kind of high-tech thriller." A KSL.com report on the book called it "a fast-paced, well-written novel" with characters that "have real depth and are instantly likeable." Dark Memories won the 2013 Whitney Award for Best Speculative Novel.

== Personal life ==
Savage and his wife, Jennifer, have four children and nine grandchildren. He is a member of the Church of Jesus Christ of Latter-day Saints. As of 2013, he lived in Spanish Fork, Utah. Savage has held numerous job in his life, including CEO of an internet company, plumber, French chef, mall Santa and radio talk show host. On his website, he cites "reading, watching movies, camping, traveling, and spending time with his family" as his favorite activities.

== Works ==
=== As J. Scott Savage ===
Farworld series

- Water Keep (2008), ISBN 978-1590389621
- Land Keep (2009), ISBN 978-1606411643
- Air Keep (2013), ISBN 978-1609073251
- Fire Keep (2014), ISBN 978-1609077914

Case File 13 series

- Zombie Kid (2012), ISBN 978-0-06-213325-0
- Making the Team (2013), ISBN 978-0062133311
- Evil Twins (2014), ISBN 978-0062133373
- Curse of the Mummy's Uncle (2015) [forthcoming], ISBN 978-0062324061

Mysteries of Cove series

- Fires of Invention (2015)
- Gears of Revolution (2016)
- Embers of Destruction (2017)

Stand-alone works

- The Lost Wonderland Diaries (2020)

=== As Jeffrey S. Savage ===
Shandra Covington series

- House of Secrets (2005), ISBN 1598110063
- Dead on Arrival (2006), ISBN 978-1598112221
- A Time To Die (2010), ISBN 978-1598116236

Stand-alone works

- Cutting Edge (2001), ISBN 1577348443
- Into the Fire (2002), ISBN 159156042X
- The Fourth Nephite (2010), ISBN 978-1606416570
- Dark Memories (2013), ISBN 978-1621080558

== Awards and nominations ==
- Nominated for the 2008 Cybils Award for middle grade Fantasy and Science Fiction – Water Keep
- Nominated for the 2009 Cybils Award for elementary/middle Fantasy and Science Fiction – Land Keep
- 2013 Whitney Award for Best Speculative Novel – Dark Memories
- Finalist for the 2015 AML Award for Middle Grade Novel – Fires of Invention
- Nominated for the 2015–2016 Louisiana Young Readers' Choice Award – Zombie Kid
- Nominated for the 2018–2018 Young Hoosier Book Award for Middle Grades – Fires of Invention
- 2020 Foreword Reviews INDIE Bronze Winner for Juvenile Fiction – The Lost Wonderland Diaries
