= Max Brallier =

Children's book author

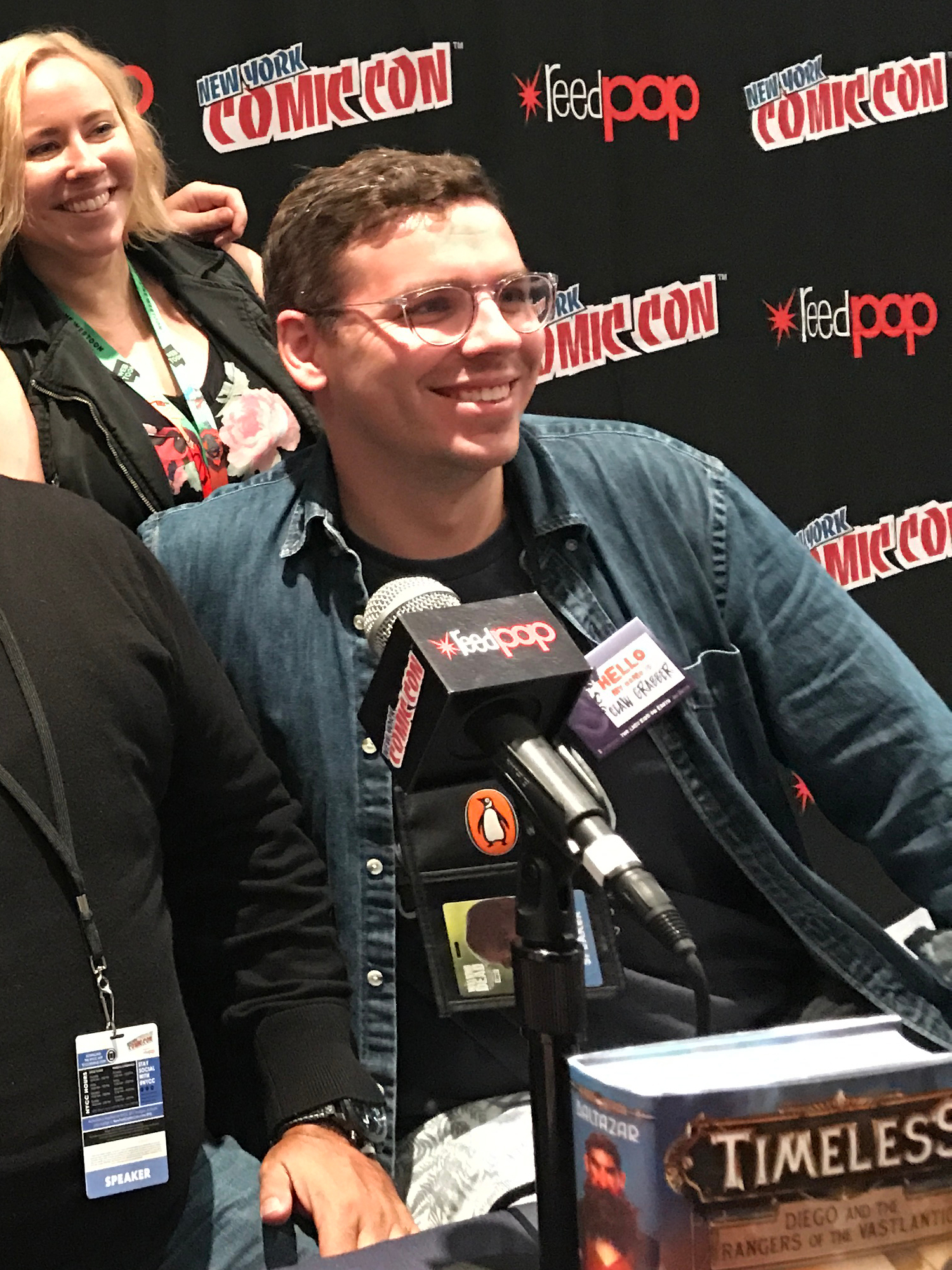
- Brallier in 2017 at the New York Comic Con
- Born: September 8, 1983 (age 43); Belmont, Massachusetts, U.S.
- Occupation: Author
- Writing career
- Pen name: Jack Chabert
- Website: maxbrallier.com

Max Brallier (born September 8, 1983) is an American children's book author and has written more than 15 books. He is best known for his New York Times bestselling series The Last Kids on Earth, which has been made into a TV series by Netflix.

== Personal life and education ==
Max Brallier was born on September 8, 1983 in Belmont, Massachusetts. He moved to Pittsburgh, Pennsylvania when he was 4. He moved to Reading, Massachusetts in third grade in 1991, where he attended Joshua Eaton Elementary School. He then attended Parker Middle School, on which the middle school in The Last Kids on Earth is based. He graduated from Reading Memorial High School in 2001 and then Ithaca College in 2005 with a degree in film.

As a child he liked David Macaulay and Where's Waldo books. His favorite book of all time is Bart Simpson's Guide to Life.

He has one daughter, Lila, with his wife, Alyse.

== Career ==
Brallier previously worked in marketing at St. Martin's Press and as a game designer for the virtual world Poptropica. He says he first knew he wanted to be writer after he published his first book, a coffee table book written for adults called Reasons to Smoke (2007), although in other sources he says he wanted to write stories from the age of 14. He began writing children's books under the pen name Jack Chabert in 2014, starting with the book series Eerie Elementary, and the graphic novel Poptropica: Mystery of the Map (2016). He also has written books under his own name for LEGO, Adventure Time, and Steven Universe, among others.

In 2015 he published the first in his series Galactic Hot Dogs as well as the first book in the Last Kids on Earth series.

In 2019, he co-wrote and produced the film VFW for Fangoria.

== Bibliography ==
- Can You Survive the Zombie Apocalypse? (2011)
- Highway to Hell (2016)
- Poptropica: Mystery of the Map (2016) (as Jack Chabert)

=== Non-fiction ===
- Reasons To Smoke (2007)
- Reasons to Drink (2009)
- Toilet Trivia (2009)
- Man Enough? (2012)

=== The Last Kids on Earth ===
- The Last Kids on Earth (2015) #1
- The Last Kids on Earth and the Zombie Parade (2016) #2
- The Last Kids on Earth and the Nightmare King (2017) #3
- The Last Kids on Earth and the Cosmic Beyond (2018) #4
- The Last Kids on Earth and the Midnight Blade (2019) #5
- The Last Kids on Earth Survival Guide (2019) (standalone)
- The Last Kids on Earth: June's Wild Flight (2020) (standalone)
- The Last Kids on Earth and the Skeleton Road (2020) #6
- The Last Kids on Earth: Thrilling Tales from the Tree House (2021) (standalone)
- The Last Kids on Earth and the Doomsday Race (2021) #7
- The Last Kids on Earth: Quint and Dirk's Hero Quest (2022) (standalone)
- The Last Kids on Earth and the Forbidden Fortress (2022) #8
- The Last Kids on Earth and the Monster Dimension (2023) #9
- The Last Kids on Earth Book 1 Graphic Novel (2024) (standalone)
- The Last Kids on Earth and the Destructor's Lair (2025) #10

=== Galactic Hot Dogs ===
1. Cosmoe's Wiener Getaway (2015)
2. The Wiener Strikes Back (2016)
3. Revenge of the Space Pirates (2017)

=== Eerie Elementary (as Jack Chabert) ===
1. The School Is Alive! (2014)
2. The Locker Ate Lucy! (2014)
3. Recess Is a Jungle! (2016)
4. The Science Fair is Freaky! (2016)
5. School Freezes Over! (2016)
6. Sam Battles the Machine! (2017)
7. Classes Are Canceled! (2017)
8. The Hall Monitors Are Fired! (2018)
9. The Art Show Attacks! (2018)
10. The End of Orson Eerie? (2019)
