= Dave Shumka =

Canadian podcaster, comedian, and writer (born 1980)

- Born: David Shumka; November 30, 1980 (age 45); Vancouver, British Columbia
- Education: Bachelor of Arts; Radio and Television Broadcasting
- Alma mater: University of Victoria; British Columbia Institute of Technology
- Occupations: Comedian; writer; blogger; podcaster
- Years active: 2005–present
- Organization: Maximum Fun
- Spouse(s): Abby Shumka, 2011–Present
- Awards: 2012 – Canadian Comedy Awards Best Podcast – Stop Podcasting Yourself 2013 – Canadian Comedy Awards Best Podcast – Stop Podcasting Yourself; 2014 – Canadian Comedy Awards Best Audio Show or Series – Stop Podcasting Yourself; 2020 – Rockie Awards Podcast of the Year – This Sounds Serious 2023 – Webby Awards Best Limited Series – Let's Make A Sci-Fi
- Website: daveshumka.com

David Shumka (born November 30, 1980) is a Vancouver writer, podcaster, blogger, and former stand-up comedian. He is known for pioneering podcasting.

In 2008, he co-created Stop Podcasting Yourself, which he co-hosts with Graham Clark.

== Personal life ==
Shumka grew up in Kitsilano, Vancouver. He performed improv in high school, coached by Taz VanRassel.

He married his high school sweetheart, Abby Shumka (née Campbell), in 2011. They have two daughters and two dogs.

Shumka is known for his love of ice cream and voracious appetite for music. His favourite restaurant is Dairy Queen.

== Podcasting ==
=== Stop Podcasting Yourself ===
In 2008, Shumka had the idea to create a weekly talk podcast, built a podcasting studio in his basement, and enlisted his friend Graham Clark to join him. On March 2, 2008, Shumka and Clark released the first episode of Stop Podcasting Yourself. The show has a new comedian guest each week, and accidentally invented the chat show format.

He and Clark met Jesse Thorn and joined the Maximum Fun network in 2011.

Shumka and Clark were nominated for, and won Best Podcast twice at the Canadian Comedy Awards, in 2012 and 2013, in recognition of Stop Podcasting Yourself. They also won the Canadian Comedy Award for Best Audio Show or Series in 2014.

The podcast has been recorded live at festivals such as Just for Laughs.

Stop Podcasting Yourself celebrated 500 episodes in 2017, and its 10th anniversary in 2018. The show is still recorded at Shumka's home studio.

Guests have included Paul F. Tompkins Brent Butt, Nikki Glaser, and Tom Scharpling.

==== Our Debut Album ====
On May 4, 2016, Shumka and Clark debuted Our Debut Album, a podcast in which the two comedians had just one hour to write a song, all of which would be produced by Jay Arner and compiled into an album of the same name. The show was 13 weeks long, and the duo produced 12 tracks for their album, which was released on July 12, 2017.

=== CBC ===
Shumka was a producer and host in various capacities for CBC Radio from 2010 to 2015, working at CBC Music and CBC Radio 3. He also contributed articles in his work at CBC Music, including pieces attributed to staff writers.

=== Kelly & Kelly ===
At CBC, Shumka met Chris Kelly and Pat Kelly. They worked together to produce Slack's corporate podcast.

In 2018, Shumka officially joined Kelly & Kelly as a writer and producer. He edited their show, Dexter Guff is Smarter Than You from 2017 to 2019.

Shumka is also the producer and editor of Here We Go Again with Kal Penn on IHeartMedia.

==== This Sounds Serious ====
In 2018, Shumka co-created This Sounds Serious, a Castbox original satirical true crime comedy podcast with Kelly & Kelly and Peter Oldring. It ran for three seasons. With the This Sounds Serious team, Shumka won the 2020 Rockie Award for Podcast of the Year at the Banff World Media Festival.

==== Let's Make ====
On March 1, 2022, Shumka introduced a new podcast from the team who made This Sounds Serious in partnership with CBC Radio. Let's Make A Sci-Fi starred Ryan Beil, Maddy Kelly, and Mark Chavez, who aimed to write a sci-fi TV pilot over the course of eight episodes. The season won a 2023 Webby Award for Best Limited Series.

Season 2 of Let's Make switched genres to Let's Make a Rom-Com, which premiered on Valentine's Day 2023 and was also eight episodes long. The third and final season, Let's Make a Horror, took place over 10 episodes.

=== Other podcasts ===
Shumka has appeared as a guest on numerous podcasts, including Never Not Funny, Utopia To Me? With Chris Locke, Jordan, Jesse, Go!, Retail Nightmares, Jordan, Jesse, Go!, The Dollop, Doug Loves Movies, Blocked Party, and Evil Men.

== Other writing ==
Shumka created his Tumblr blog Kid Casting in 2008. Shumka also gained notoriety on Twitter.

In 2020, he did punch-up on an episode of Corner Gas Animated.

== Stand-up comedy ==
Shumka performed stand-up comedy from 2005 to 2013. In 2008, he opened for Louis C.K..

In 2009, he was featured alongside Maria Bamford on XM Radio Canada's Maple Leaf All Stars show.

== Shooting ==
At 11:15pm on July 4, 2013, Shumka survived a shooting outside Little Mountain Gallery in Mount Pleasant, Vancouver. A random gunman exiting a vehicle approached Shumka and his friend, who were leaving a comedy show. The gunman fired at Shumka at point-blank range. Shumka ducked and ran, his scalp only grazed by the bullet. He didn't witness when the shooter then shot twice more, once at the crowd and once to suicide.

The shooting resulted in the rupture of Shumka's eardrum, but he was not taken to hospital. The incident was discussed on the next episode of Stop Podcasting Yourself with Shumka's co-host Graham Clark and guest Colt Cabana (both of whom were present at Little Mountain Gallery, but did not witness Shumka being shot). Shumka called attention to the importance of education on mental illness and suggested his sympathizers donate to mental health resources.
