= Couples Clownselling =

Vancouver live comedy show

Couples Clownselling is a live comedy show in Vancouver, British Columbia inspired by couples therapy. The show is hosted by comedians Cass Furman and Aaron Campbell, a real-life engaged couple who are openly unqualified to "counsel" comedians and their non-comedian partners. Couples Clownselling is focused on giving stand-up comedians' romantic partners the opportunity to share their perspectives. The alternative comedy show takes on a panel format, as the hosts and guests answer anonymous audience questions about relationships.

Past guests include Ivan Decker, Ola Dada, and Graham Clark. In 2026, Couples Clownselling was featured at Just For Laughs Vancouver comedy festival as a part of their "Best of the West" series.

The show currently takes place at Little Mountain Gallery.

== Radio and podcast appearances ==
| Show | Episode title | Publisher | Notes | Ref |
|---|---|---|---|---|
| OHdio | Le spectacle d'humour Couples Clownselling | Radio-Canada | French | |
| On the Coast | Comedians and their partners participate in 'Couples Clownselling' | CBC Radio One | | |
