= Taz VanRassel =

Canadian comedian and actor

Taz VanRassel is a Canadian comedian and actor primarily known for his work in improv theatre. He was nominated as Best Male Improviser in Canada at the Canadian Comedy Awards from 2007 to 2015, is a founding member of The Sunday Service improv troupe (Winners of best improv troupe 2012 Canadian Comedy Awards), of Instant Theatre Company, 9-year member of the Vancouver TheatreSports League and is a member and co-creator of the sketch comedy group Titmouse! with Eisner Award-winning comic book writer/comedian Ian Boothby.

Working as an improviser for over twelve years VanRassel was a featured performer in Canadian Comedian and Comedy Inc. star Roman Danylo's weekly live show Urban Improv for several years, and was a featured performer at the Vancouver Fringe Festival, the Combustion Festival, the Toronto International Improv Festival, the Chicago International Improv Festival, the Berlin Improv Festival, Improvaganza in Edmonton and the Vancouver Comedy Fest where he has performed with Bob Odenkirk and David Cross, Scott Adsit, Oscar Nunez and Paul F. Tompkins. Taz has also performed special shows with Ryan Stiles and Colin Mochrie on separate occasions.

He has appeared in several commercials, most recently in the New Balance commercial C-Store Clerk in which VanRassel plays an "ethnic" shopkeeper who objects to a customer's bare foot but loves his shoed foot with the tagline "Hey! That foot must go! But that foot, super A plus bro-guy." He also appeared in a commercial for The Harris Group (Real Estate Advisors) as inept realtor Gary Shlitz.

He was a repeat guest on the podcast Stop Podcasting Yourself, hosted by Graham Clark and Dave Shumka.

VanRassel co-founded The Sunday Service with Jessie Award-winning actor Ryan Beil. They present a weekly show at The Fox Cabaret in Vancouver, B.C. and were nominated for Best Improv Troupe at The Canadian Comedy Awards in 2011, 2012 (winners), 2013, 2014, and 2015.

VanRassel is the voice of Victor in the short film Animal Behaviour.
