= Ryan Beil =

Canadian actor, comedian, and podcaster

- Born: Vancouver, British Columbia, Canada
- Education: University of British Columbia
- Occupations: Actor; comedian; podcaster
- Years active: 2005–present
- Agent: Trisko Talent Management
- Partner: Lili Beaudoin

Ryan Beil is a Canadian actor, comedian, improviser, and podcaster. He is best known for his improv group The Sunday Service, running Little Mountain Gallery, and co-starring in A&W Canada commercials.

== Early life ==
Beil was born in Vancouver.

He attended the University of British Columbia, where he received his Bachelor of Fine Arts in theatre acting in 2005.

== Comedy ==
=== The Sunday Service ===
In 2005, Beil and his friends started The Sunday Service, an improv group consisting of Taz VanRassel, Kevin Lee, Mark Chavez, Aaron Read, and Caitlin Howden with musical director Emmett Hall. They performed every Sunday at the Kozmik Zoo in Mount Pleasant, Vancouver. The group would soon find international success. By 2014, The Sunday Service moved to The Fox Cabaret, where they are still performing every Sunday night, and were nominated for Best Improv Troupe at the Canadian Comedy Awards from 2011 to 2015 (and won in 2012).

=== Little Mountain Gallery ===
When the future of community comedy venue Little Mountain Gallery was uncertain, Beil stepped up to run the Mount Pleasant not-for-profit venue.

=== Blind Tiger ===
In 2018, The Sunday Service joined forces with comedy duo Hip.Bang! to open Blind Tiger Comedy, a comedy school operating out of the original Little Mountain Gallery in Mount Pleasant.

=== Podcasts ===
On May 7, 2010, Beil appeared on Stop Podcasting Yourself for the first time. He has since appeared on the show more than 10 times.

Beil also appeared on Blocked Party, Retail Nightmares, Spontaneanation with Paul F. Tompkins, Sexy Unique Podcast, Improv4humans, and This Sounds Serious.

==== Let's Make ====
Beil co-hosted all 3 seasons of the Kelly & Kelly/CBC Radio podcast Let's Make a Sci-Fi with Mark Chavez and Maddy Kelly. The first season premiered March 1, 2022, and followed the hosts as they took a sci-fi show from pitch to pilot over 8 episodes. The season won a 2023 Webby Award for Best Limited Series.

Season 2 premiered on February 14, 2023, when Let's Make became Let's Make a Rom-Com. It ran for 8 episodes.

The third and final season, Let's Make a Horror, launched on October 11, 2023. It ran over the course of 10 episodes.

He and Chavez now host The Town Show, an improv podcast from the same team.

== Acting ==
=== A&W commercials ===
Beil was the co-star in a series of commercials for A&W Canada from 2009 until 2012, in which he played "A&W manager Allen" Lulu's sidekick and trainee. In 2015, he created a social media campaign, #WhereHasRyanBeen, to try to reconnect with the company, who acknowledged the hashtag on Twitter.

On August 8, 2015, Beil reprised his trainee character for one live-experience ad, handing out Teen Burgers to tubers floating down the Okanogan River at a prop drive-through in Penticton.

=== Film ===
Year	Title	Role	Ref.
2005	Time Helmet	Gilfoyle	
2005	Underclassman	Warren Williams	
2007	Kodiak	Red	
2010	Pancake Breakfast	Mark	
2010	A Family Thanksgiving	Coffee Shop Employee	
2013	That Burning Feeling	Duane	
2013	The Dry Spell	Terry Bottom	
2014	Golden Mean	Ryan	
2014	The Town That Came A-Courtin'	Pepper Waiter	
2014	Focus	Conley	
2014	In My Dreams	Skinny Man	
2014	The Prime Minister Challenge	Himself	
2014	A Fairly Odd Summer	Crazy Guy #3	
2014	Anxious Oswald Green	Oswald Green	
2014	Big Eyes	Nosy Gallery Guy	
2014	Grumpy Cat's Worst Christmas Ever	Corbin	
2014	Hipster Brunch	Manager	
2015	Fatal Memories	Luke Conner	
2015	Air	Male Reporter	
2016	Grocery Store Action Movie	Cashier	
2016	Army of One	US Customs Agent	
2017	Bigger Fatter Liar	Mr. Hogg	
2017	Bob the Builder: Mega Machines	Tread (US version)	
2018	Animal Behaviour	Dr Clement - dog	
2018	Freaks	Leo the Cook	
2018	When the Storm Fades	Jerry	
2019	My Little Pony: Equestria Girls – Holidays Unwrapped	Zephyr Breeze	
2019	Come to Daddy	Danny	
2020	The Main Event	Lyft Passenger	
2021	Four Walls	Mark	
2021	There's Someone Inside Your House	Dave the Uber Driver	
2021	Making Spirits Bright	Wade Edwards	
2022	Quarantine Fling	Todd	
2023	With Love and a Major Organ	Mr. Mann	
2023	Blessings of Christmas	Chef Louie	
2023	Holiday Road	Agent	
2024	Kryptic	Tour Guide	
2024	Tip Line	Ardie	
2024	The Santa Class	Isaac	
2025	Eternity	Fenwick	
2026	All Night Wrong	Toby	

=== Television ===
Year	Title	Role	Notes	Ref.
2011	Supernatural	Set Guy	Season 6, Episode 15, "The French Mistake"	
2011	The Party	Stu		
2011	Hellcats	Technician	Season 1, Episode 22, "I'm Sick Y'all"	
2011	Hiccups	Duncan	Season 2, Episode 9, "Home Swapping"	
2012	Level Up	Ranger John	Season 2, Episode 4, "Intelligence Potion #9"	
2012–2013	Mr. Young	Balloon Operator/Alien 2	4 episodes	
2013	How to Be an Actor	Casting Director	Season 1, Episode 4, "Lesson 4: Auditioning"	
2013	Psych	Fielding Mellish	Season 7, Episode 2, "Juliet Takes a Luvvah"	
2013	Everyone's Famous	Donald	Season 1, Episode 1, one-hour special	
2014	Some Assembly Required	Todd	Season 1, Episode 2, "Philharmonica"	
2014	The Tomorrow People	Avery	Season 1, Episode 16, "Superhero"	
2015	Proof	Dr. Phillip Ames	Season 1, Episode 4, "Redemption"	
2015	The X-Files	The Werelizard	Season 10, Episode 3, "Mulder & Scully Meet the Were-Monster"	
2015–2019	iZombie	Jimmy/Jimmy Hahn	10 episodes	
2016	The Magicians	Robert	Season 1, Episode 3, "Consequences of Advanced Spellcasting"	
2016	Second Chance	Alan Zedmore	Season 1_{,} Episode 5, "Scratch That Glitch"	
2016	Roadies	Dale the Room Service Guy	Season 1, Episode 1, "Life Is a Carnival"	
2016	Motive	Devin		
2016	No Tomorrow	Charity Worker		
2016–2018	Mech-X4	Leo Mendel	19 episodes	
2016–2019	My Little Pony: Friendship Is Magic	Zephyr Breeze		
2017	Chuck's Choice	U-Decide 3000	20 episodes	
2017	Hit the Road	Robert Kushmn		
2017–2018	Android Employed	Derek	5 episodes	
2017–2019	My Little Pony: Equestria Girls – Better Together	Zephyr Breeze	3 episodes	
2018	UnREAL	Editor	4 episodes	
2018	Trial & Error	Associate Mayor	4 episodes	
2018	Littlest Pet Shop: A World of Our Own	Manny Mouser/Bulldog Janitor	4 episodes	
2018–2019	Mega Man: Fully Charged	Mega Mini/Wayne	52 episodes	
2019	The Twilight Zone	Ventriloquist		
2019–2020	You Me Her	Coach Remi	3 episodes	
2020	A Million Little Things	Louis		
2020	My Little Pony: Pony Life	Finn Tastic/Producer Pony		
2020–2023	Upload	Craig Munthers	6 episodes	
2021	Are You Afraid of the Dark?	Sardo	5 episodes	
2021	The Slowest Slow	Beast		
2021	Legends of Tomorrow	DJ S'more Money		
2021	Turner & Hooch	Larry Gluck		
2021	Scaredy Cats	Claws	2 episodes	
2021	Gabby Duran & the Unsittables	Blurt	5 episodes	
2022	Charmed	Donnie		
2022	Ninjago	Teal Ninja	5 episodes	
2022	Alaska Daily	Steve		
2022	The Guava Juice Show	Jay	3 episodes	
2023	Gary and His Demons	Larry/Demons	6 episodes	
2023	Animal Control	Booth Operator		
2023	Psi Cops	Jakes/Player 2/King Killer	5 episodes	
2023	Creepshow	Jay		
2023	Zokie of Planet Ruby	King Pootywinkle		
2024	So Help Me Todd	Mr. Purple		
2024	Reginald the Vampire	Santos		
2024–2025	Ninjago: Dragons Rising	Roby	15 episodes	
2025	Family Law			
2025	Super Team Canada	Shy Ken		
2025–2026	Percy Jackson and the Olympians	Assistant Satyr	4 episodes	
