= Cass Furman =

Canadian actress and comedian

- Born: Cassidy Furman; Toronto, Canada
- Education: York University
- Occupations: Actress; comedian
- Years active: 2017–present
- Partner: Aaron Campbell (2023–present)

Cassidy Furman (born March 31) is a Canadian actor and comedian. She is best known for her stand-up comedy, as well as hosting live comedy shows Pillow Talk and Couples Clownselling. In 2026, she will be featured on season 7 of CBC's The New Wave of Standup.

== Early life ==
Furman is originally from Toronto, where she studied drama at York University. She later moved to Vancouver, where she began her comedy career, inspired by SCTV (especially Catherine O'Hara) and Saturday Night Live.

She is bisexual.

== Career ==
Furman performed live comedy for the first time in 2022. By 2023, she was hosting The Weekly, a live drop-in show at The Motn and had started her podcast, The Podcass.

Furman was featured on Just for Laughs Originals Album in 2024. In 2025, she filmed her first special with Comedy Here Often. She also appeared on Jokers Canada and Stop Podcasting Yourself. Furman is a member of Jane Stanton's comedy group The Queens of Comedy alongside Niki Mohrdar and Sophia Johnson.

In 2024, she started Pillow Talk, a monthly slumber party-themed stand-up showcase co-produced with Niki Mohrdar, at Little Mountain Gallery. The show was featured in the 2025 Vancouver Fringe Festival and Just for Laughs Vancouver in 2026.

Also at Little Mountain Gallery, Furman has co-hosted Couples Clownselling with her fiancé, Aaron Campbell, since 2024. The show was featured in Just For Laughs' "Best of the West" series in 2026. On Valentine's Day 2026, Campbell proposed onstage as the show's surprise finale.
