= All Night Wrong (film) =

2026 film by Jason James

- Theatrical release poster
- Directed by: Jason James
- Written by: Jason Filiatrault
- Produced by: Amber Ripley; Jason James; Richard Kondal
- Starring: Maria Bakalova; Zach Cherry; Tyler Labine; Preston Vanderslice; Ryan Beil; Devon Kenzo; Grace Dove; Nisreen Slim; Shaw Madson; Emily Hampshire
- Cinematography: Byron Kopman
- Edited by: Jim Hampton; Christopher Watson
- Music by: Adiescar Chase
- Production companies: Resonance Films; Goodbye Productions; Big Safari
- Distributed by: Mongrel Media (Canada)
- Release dates: June 2, 2026 (SXSW London); August 14, 2026 (digital)
- Running time: 93 minutes
- Countries: Canada; United Kingdom
- Language: English

All Night Wrong is a 2026 comedy film directed and produced by Jason James and written by Jason Filiatrault. It stars Zach Cherry, Maria Bakalova, Emily Hampshire, Tyler Labine, and Ryan Beil.

The film premiered at the South by Southwest London on June 2, 2026, and on August 14 via digital platforms. It was given a limited theatrical release in Canada on August 22, 2026.

== Cast ==
- Maria Bakalova as Ell
- Zach Cherry as Gary
- Tyler Labine as Burke
- Preston Vanderslice as Chad
- Ryan Beil as Toby
- Devon Kenzo as Asam
- Grace Dove as Alice
- Nisreen Slim as Officer Parnham
- Shaw Madson as Officer Jacobs
- Emily Hampshire as Laura

== Production ==
In September 2024, it was reported that a comedy film directed by Jason James was in development, with Zach Cherry and Maria Bakalova cast as the leads. The Canada-UK co-production began principal photography in October 2024 in British Columbia. Emily Hampshire, Tyler Labine, and Ryan Beil joined the cast. Anamorphic Media helped finance the film.

== Release ==
All Night Wrong premiered at the South by Southwest London on June 2, 2026. The film was released theatrically by Voltage Pictures in the United States and on digital platforms on August 14, 2026. It was released in Canadian theatres on August 22, 2026.
