= Niki Mohrdar =

Iranian-Canadian comedian

- Born: Niki Mohrdar; Iran
- Citizenship: Canadian
- Education: Bachelor of Journalism; Master's of Communications
- Alma mater: Concordia University; Toronto Metropolitan University; York University
- Occupation: Comedian
- Employer: Little Mountain Gallery
- Title: Comedian - Actor - Programming Manager

Niki Mohrdar is a Vancouver-based Canadian comedian and podcaster best known for her stand-up comedy, hosting live comedy shows such as Pillow Talk, her appearance on OutTv's Killjoy Comedy, and her work as Booking Manager at Little Mountain Gallery.

In 2026, she will be featured on season 7 of CBC Gem's The New Wave of Standup.

== Early life ==
Mohrdar was born in Iran, and moved to Canada at the age of 3. She is fluent in Farsi.

She studied journalism and communication and cultural studies at Concordia University in Montreal, Quebec and got her Master's in Communications from a Toronto Metropolitan University/York University program in Toronto, Ontario.

She is bisexual.

== Career ==
In 2023, Mohrdar started Soft For Us, a podcast with fellow Vancouver comedians Amy Walsh and Danielle Florence that placed second in the podcast category of The Georgia Straight's 2024 Best of Vancouver awards. She also appeared on Jokers Canada, Blocked Party, and Stop Podcasting Yourself. Mohrdar is a member of Jane Stanton's comedy group The Queens of Comedy alongside Cass Furman and Sophia Johnson.

She is the programming manager at Little Mountain Gallery.

In 2024, she started Pillow Talk, a monthly slumber party-themed stand-up showcase co-produced with Cass Furman, at Little Mountain Gallery. The show was featured in the 2025 Vancouver Fringe Festival and Just for Laughs Vancouver in 2026. In 2024, she was featured on the Just for Laughs Originals Album.

In 2025, Mohrdar was featured on season 2 of Killjoy Comedy on OutTv.

Mohrdar is the political correspondent on the Calgary talk show, The Tomorrow Show with Faris Hytiaa.
