= Jane Stanton =

Canadian actress and comedian

- Born: June 30, 1974 (age 51); North Vancouver, Canada
- Occupations: Actress; comedian
- Years active: 2004–present
- Website: thejanestanton.com

Jane Stanton (born June 30, 1974) is a Vancouver actor and comedian best known for her comedy.

== Early life ==
Stanton is originally from North Vancouver, British Columbia.

== Career ==
Stanton started her career in stand-up comedy in 2004.

In 2006, she was voted Vancouver's funniest female comedian.

In 2010, she started a weekly stand-up comedy show at Raw Canvas with Darcy Michael. On November 6, 2010, Stanton appeared on CBC Radio's The Debaters for the first time, opposite Michael.

Stanton opened for Ali Wong on February 13, 2015.

In 2015, she joined the group Rape is Real and Everywhere, a sexual assault-education comedy group that reimagined rape jokes.

Stanton recorded her album on November 10, 2017. Date Night was released August 8, 2018. It reached No. 1 on the iTunes comedy charts.

In June 2019, she quit her day job to focus on comedy full time.

On February 10, 2021, Stanton launched High School Sucked, her podcast co-created with Darcy Michael. The show consistently placed in Apple Podcasts top 100 shows.

Stanton is the founder of the comedy group The Queens of Comedy, headlining shows with Cass Furman, Niki Mohrdar, and Sophia Johnson. She also hosts Swipe Right: A Comedy Show About Dating.

Stanton executive produced Time Bandits, an Apple TV series that premiered on July 24, 2024. It was nominated for 6 awards at the 2026 Emmy Awards.

Stanton also appeared as herself in the Crave documentary film Happily Ever Laughter: The Darcy & Jer Story, which premiered on November 4, 2024.

== Acting ==
Year	Title	Type	Role	Notes	Ref.
2007; 2010	Psych	TV series	Slob; Female Patron	Episode: "Rob-a-Bye Baby"; Episode: "Mr. Yin Presents"	
2010	The Staff Room	TV series	Mrs. Jane Stanton	Episode: "Coach Bletz"	
2011	The Acting Class	Web series	Jane	11 episodes	
2012	A Christmas Story 2	Film	Shoe Lady		
2013	Arctic Air	TV series	Waitress	Episode: "Hell Hath No Fury"	
2014	Recipe for Love	TV movie	Cafeteria Lady		
2015	The Returned	TV series	Tanya	Episode: "Victor"	
2015	Halifax Comedy Festival 2015	TV series	Jane (self)		
2017	Somewhere Between	TV series	Freemont Nurse	Episode: "Madness"	
2019	The Magicians	TV series	Waitress	Episode: "Lost, Found, Fucked"	
2019	Fast Layne	TV series	Glady	Episode: "Mile 7: On the Run"	
2019	Winnipeg Comedy Festival	TV series	Jane Stanton	Episode: "Just My Luck"	
2021	Big Sky	TV series	Peg	Episode: "Bitter Roots"	
2021	The Mighty Ducks: Game Changers	TV series	Sherri Andrews	4 episodes	
2021	Maid	TV series	Janice	Episode: "M"	
2022	So Help Me Todd	TV series	Betty Hogenson	Episode: "Pilot"	
2024	Kryptic	Film	Maggie		
