= Tyler Labine =

Canadian-American actor (born 1978)

- Labine at the 2026 Rose City Comic Con
- Born: April 29, 1978 (age 48); Brampton, Ontario, Canada
- Occupations: Actor; comedian
- Years active: 1991–present
- Spouse: Carrie Ruscheinsky (m. 2007) (separated)

Tyler Labine (born April 29, 1978) is a Canadian actor. He is best known for starring in the film Tucker & Dale vs. Evil, the television series Breaker High, Invasion, Reaper, Deadbeat and as Dr. Iggy Frome, head of psychiatry, in the NBC medical drama New Amsterdam.

== Life and career ==
Labine grew up in Maple Ridge, British Columbia. He is the brother of actors Kyle Labine and Cameron Labine. He played the role of Dave Groves in Invasion, and Bert "Sock" Wysocki in Reaper, and Dale in the comedy-horror film Tucker & Dale vs. Evil. He played the lead character in the 2010 Fox comedy series Sons of Tucson, but the show was cancelled after four episodes (the remaining nine episodes that were shot aired that summer).

He also played Jimmy Mortimor Farrell on YTV's Breaker High from 1997 to 1998. In 2011, he co-starred in the CBS comedy Mad Love as Larry Munsch. He starred in the NBC comedy series Animal Practice alongside Justin Kirk and Bobby Lee, which premiered in September 2012. He also starred in the Hulu show Deadbeat. In 2017, he played Sherlock Hobbs in the second season of Dirk Gently's Holistic Detective Agency.

From 2018 to 2023, he was part of the main cast of New Amsterdam where he played Head of Psychiatry, Dr. Iggy Frome.

== Personal life ==
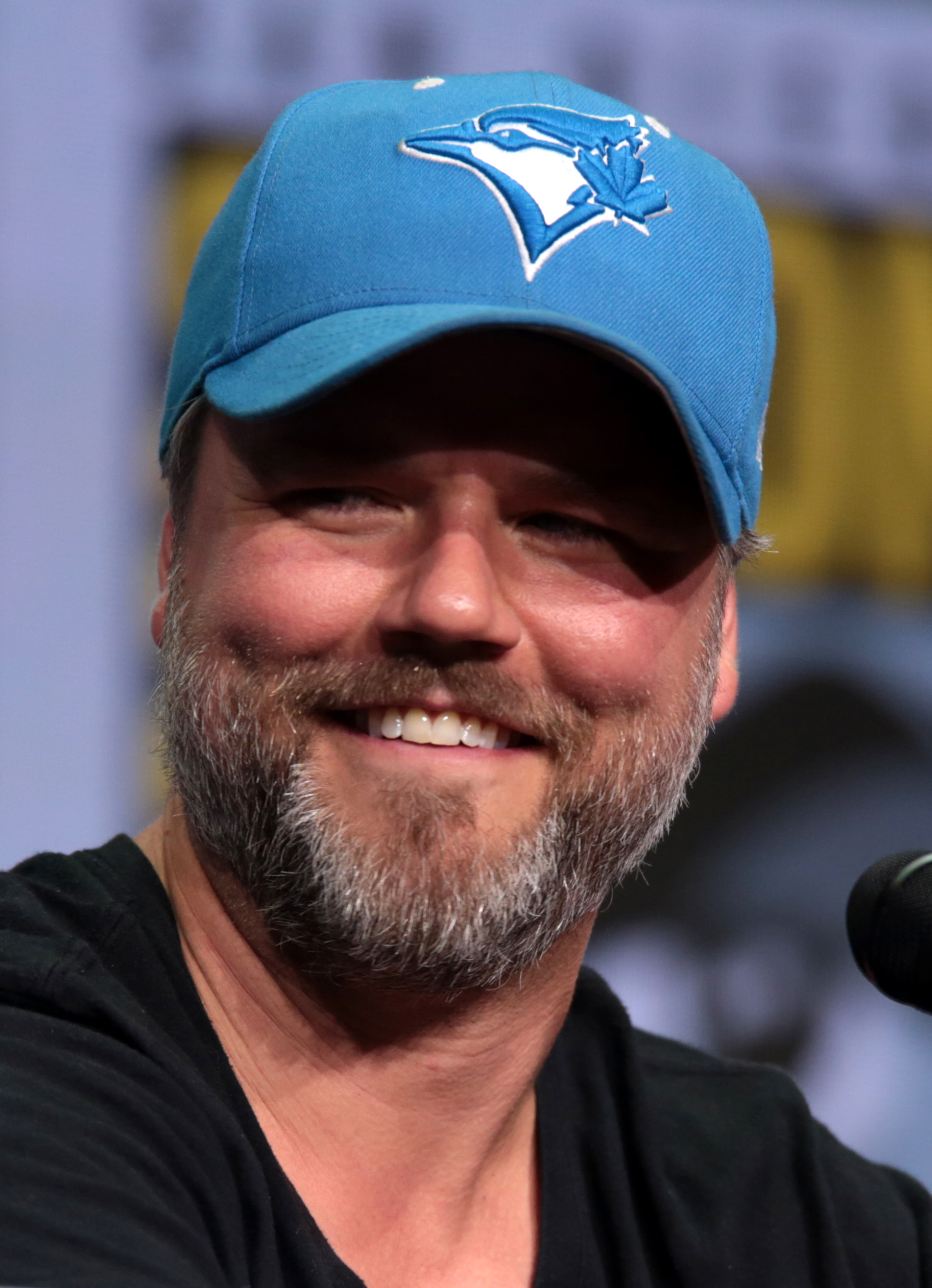
Labine at the 2017 San Diego Comic-Con to promote Dirk Gently's Holistic Detective Agency

Labine married Carrie Ruscheinsky on June 2, 2007. In 2022, Labine stated during an Instagram Live that he identifies as heteroflexible. He was hospitalized in July 2023 for a potentially fatal blood clot in his stomach.

== Filmography ==
=== Film ===
Year	Title	Role	Notes
1999	Tail Lights Fade	Grower Brian	
2000	Mr. Rice's Secret	Percival "Percy" McConnell	
2000	Marine Life	Ray	
2000	Here's to Life!	Malcolm	
2001	Antitrust	Redmond	
2002	Lone Hero	Tim	
2002	Canadian Zombie	Trent	Short film
2003	My Boss's Daughter	Spike	
2003	Evil Alien Conquerors	Croker	
2004	Pursued	Wade Steiner	
2005	Aurora Borealis	Finn	
2006	Flyboys	Briggs Lowry	
2006	Extreme Walking	Crunk Styles	
2008	Control Alt Delete	Lewis	
2008	Zack and Miri Make a Porno	Drunk Customer	
2009	The Zero Sum	Chris	
2010	Tucker & Dale vs. Evil	Dale Dobson	
2010	Badass Thieves	Max	Short film
2010	Fathers & Sons	Sean	
2011	A Good Old Fashioned Orgy	Mike McCrudden	
2011	Rise of the Planet of the Apes	Robert Franklin	
2011	Sisters & Brothers	Sean	
2012	Best Man Down	Lumpy	
2013	Monsters University	Brock Pearson	Voice
2013	Rapture-Palooza	Shorter Wraith	
2013	Cottage Country	Todd Chipowski	
2013	That Burning Feeling	Frank Purdy	
2014	Someone Marry Barry	Barry Burke	
2014	Killing Winston Jones	Doug Beaudin	
2014	Mountain Men	Toph	
2015	Weepah Way for Now	Record Executive	
2015	Zoom	Bob	
2016	The Boss	Mike	
2017	Little Evil	Karl C. Miller	
2017	Big Bear	Nick	
2018	Super Troopers 2	Mountie Christophe Bellefuille	
2018	Broken Star	Daryl	
2019	Escape Room	Mike Nolan	
2021	Escape Room: Tournament of Champions	Flashback - Mike Nolan	
2025	Egghead Republic	Dino Davis, the magazine owner	
2026	All Night Wrong	Burke	Completed
2027	Air Bud Returns	Walter	Completed

=== Television ===
Year	Title	Role	Notes
1991	Street Legal	Aaron Wineberg	Episode: "Eye of the Beholder"
1992	The Odyssey	Eagle	Episode: "Checkpoint Eagle"
1992–1993	Road to Avonlea	Alphie Bugle	2 episodes
1993	Madison	Bobby Devries	Episode: "Last Pick"
1994	Are You Afraid of the Dark?	Mark Peterson	Episode: "The Tale of the Silent Servant"
1995	The Commish	Eddie	Episode: "The Johnny Club"
1996	The X-Files	Stoner	Episodes: "War of the Coprophages", "Quagmire"
1996	Robin of Locksley	Little John	Television film
1996	Sabrina the Teenage Witch	Mark	Television film
1997	Millennium	Gavin	Episode: "Loin Like a Hunting Flame"
1997–1998	Breaker High	Jimmy Farrell	44 episodes
1998	Honey, I Shrunk the Kids: The TV Show	Elderbob	Episode: "Honey, It's No Fun Being an Illegal Alien"
1999	First Wave	Billy	Episode: "Melody"
1999	Cold Squad	Eddie	Episode: "Death, a Love Story"
1999	H-E Double Hockey Sticks	Mark	Television film
1999	In a Class of His Own	Charles "Charlie" Zaken	Television film
2000	The Immortal	Byron	Episode: "Studio D"
2000	By Dawn's Early Light	Ox	Television film
2000	2gether	Noel Andrew Davies	Television film
2000–2001	Action Man	Brandon Caine	8 episodes
2001	Dark Angel	Cyril the Biochemist	Episode: "Radar Love"
2001	Dead Last	Scotty Sallback	13 episodes
2002	That Was Then	Donnie Pinkus	4 episodes
2003	The Twilight Zone	Wesley	Episode: "Sunrise"
2003	Da Vinci's Inquest	Hector	Episode: "Iffy Areas Around the Edges"
2003–2004	Jake 2.0	Seymour	2 episodes
2004	Like Cats and Dogs	Alex	Television film
2004–2005	Kevin Hill	Lukas Shapiro	2 episodes
2005	Into the West	Larkin	Episode: "Dreams and Schemes"
2005	Behind the Camera: The Unauthorized Story of Mork and Mindy	John Belushi	Television film
2005–2006	Invasion	Dave Groves	22 episodes
2006	Saved	Kent Fembley	Episode: "Code Zero"
2006	Boston Legal	A.D.A. Jonathan Winant	5 episodes
2007	Traveler	Eddie Hahn	Episode: "The Trader"
2007–2009	Reaper	Bert "Sock" Wysocki	31 episodes
2010	Sons of Tucson	Ron Snuffkin	13 episodes
2010	True Love	Larry	Television film
2011	Mad Love	Larry Munsch	13 episodes
2012–2013	Animal Practice	Dr. Doug Jackson	9 episodes
2013	Super Clyde	Duke	Television film
2014–2016	Deadbeat	Kevin Pacalioglu	36 episodes
2014	Royal Pains	Executive Chef Franklin Scott	Episode: "Everybody Loves Ray, Man"
2016	The X-Files	Stoner	Episode: "Mulder and Scully Meet the Were-Monster"
2016–2018	Voltron: Legendary Defender	Hunk	Voice; 72 episodes
2017	Dirk Gently's Holistic Detective Agency	Sherlock Hobbs	7 episodes
2017	Kevin (Probably) Saves the World	Bert "Sock" Wysocki	Episode: "Old Friends"
2018–2023	New Amsterdam	Dr. Iggy Frome	Main Cast
2018	It's Always Sunny in Philadelphia	Shawn Dumont	Episode: "The Gang Gets New Wheels"
2026	For All Mankind	Fred Stanislaus	7 episodes

=== Video games ===
Year	Title	Role	Notes
2017	DreamWorks Voltron VR Chronicles	Hunk (voice)	
