= Marcha Nerd =

Brazilian Carnival street band

Marcha Nerd is a Carnival street band from the city of Rio de Janeiro, Brazil. Founded in 2012 by students from the Federal University of the State of Rio de Janeiro (UNIRIO), it was conceived by Hector Gomes and Kirk Russo. Marcha Nerd was created with the aim of bringing the nerd community into the Carnival festivities, a scene traditionally dominated by other musical and thematic styles. The street band made its debut in 2013 at Varnhagen Square, in the Tijuca neighborhood. In 2016, it was awarded the Serpentina de Ouro Popular Jury Prize by O Globo newspaper. As of 2018, Clara Salim shared vocal duties with Bruno Dias, while Pedro Prata led a percussion section featuring instruments like the tamborim, snare drum, and surdo. Over the years, the street band began parading in more central areas of the city due to its growing popularity; in 2018, it drew around 10,000 revelers.
