= Mad Love (TV series) =

- Also known as: True Love
- Genre: Sitcom
- Created by: Matt Tarses
- Starring: Jason Biggs; Sarah Chalke; Judy Greer; Tyler Labine
- Narrated by: Tyler Labine
- Music by: John Swihart
- Country of origin: United States
- Original language: English
- No. of seasons: 1
- No. of episodes: 13

Production
- Executive producers: Jamie Tarses; Matt Tarses
- Camera setup: Multi-camera
- Running time: 22 minutes
- Production companies: Two Soups Productions; FanFare Productions; CBS Television Studios; Sony Pictures Television

Original release
- Network: CBS
- Release: February 14 – May 16, 2011

Mad Love is an American sitcom television series created by Matt Tarses that premiered on CBS on February 14, 2011. This multi-camera sitcom starred Jason Biggs, Sarah Chalke, Judy Greer and Tyler Labine, who also is the show's narrator. It was planned as a mid-season replacement during the 2010–11 television season.

On May 15, 2011, CBS canceled the series after one season, and the series finale aired the following day, May 16.

== Premise ==
Kate, Connie, Larry, and Ben are New Yorker thirtysomethings searching for love in the city. When Kate and Ben meet and fall for each other, their friends remain cynical about the relationship. Each episode ends with some of the characters in a bar which they frequent, discussing the events of the day.

The cast describes the show as one about two couples falling in love in very different ways.

== Cast and characters ==
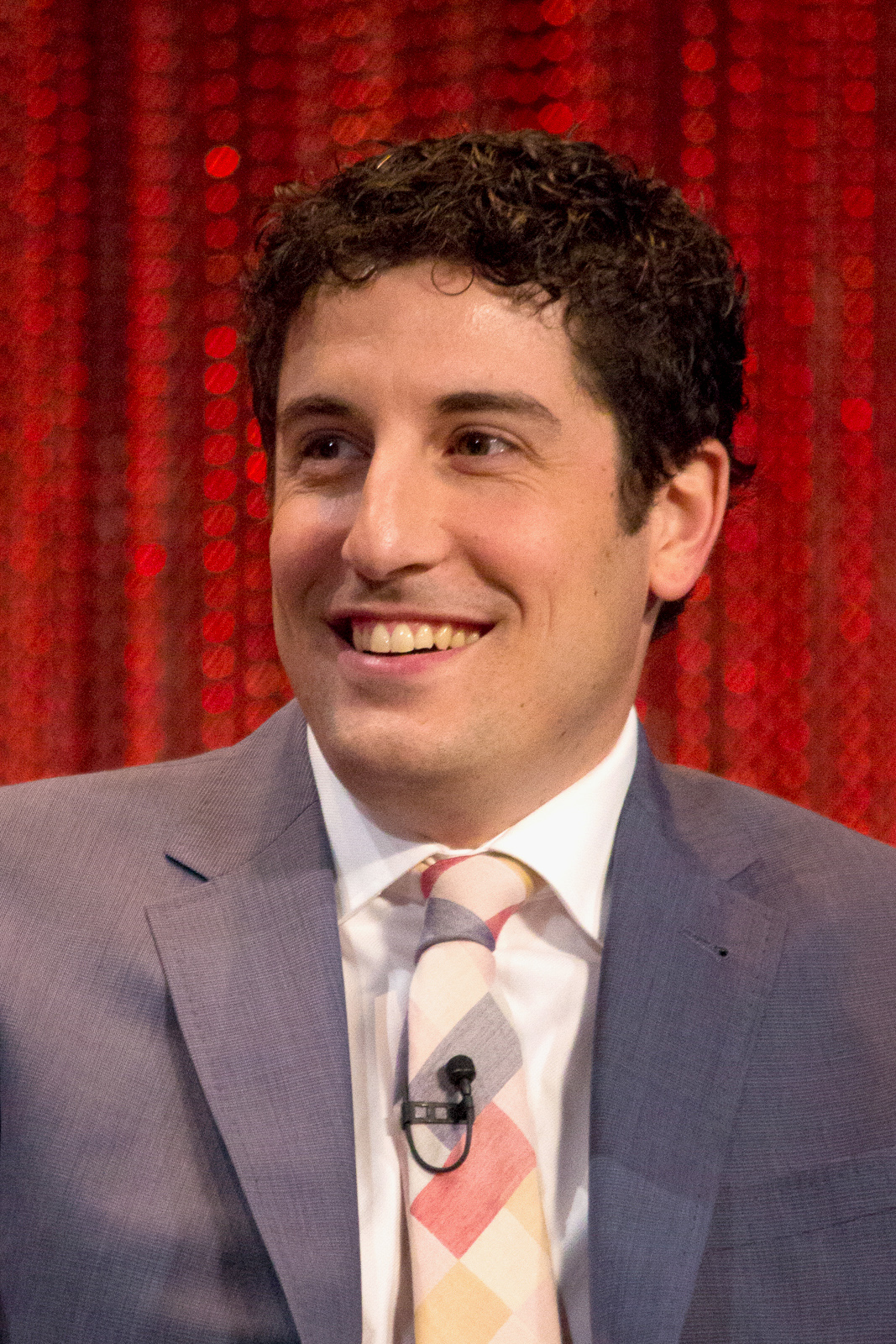
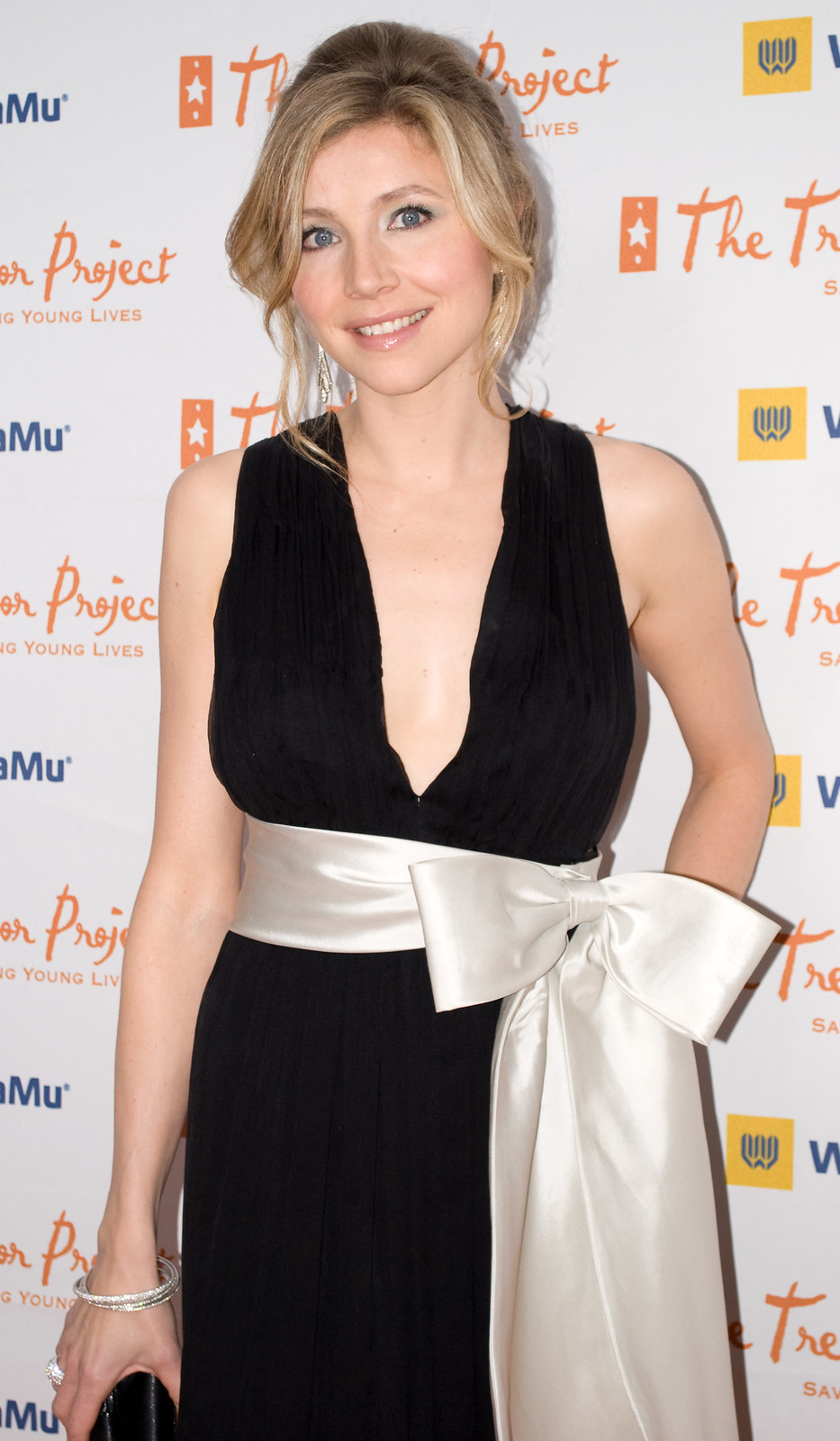
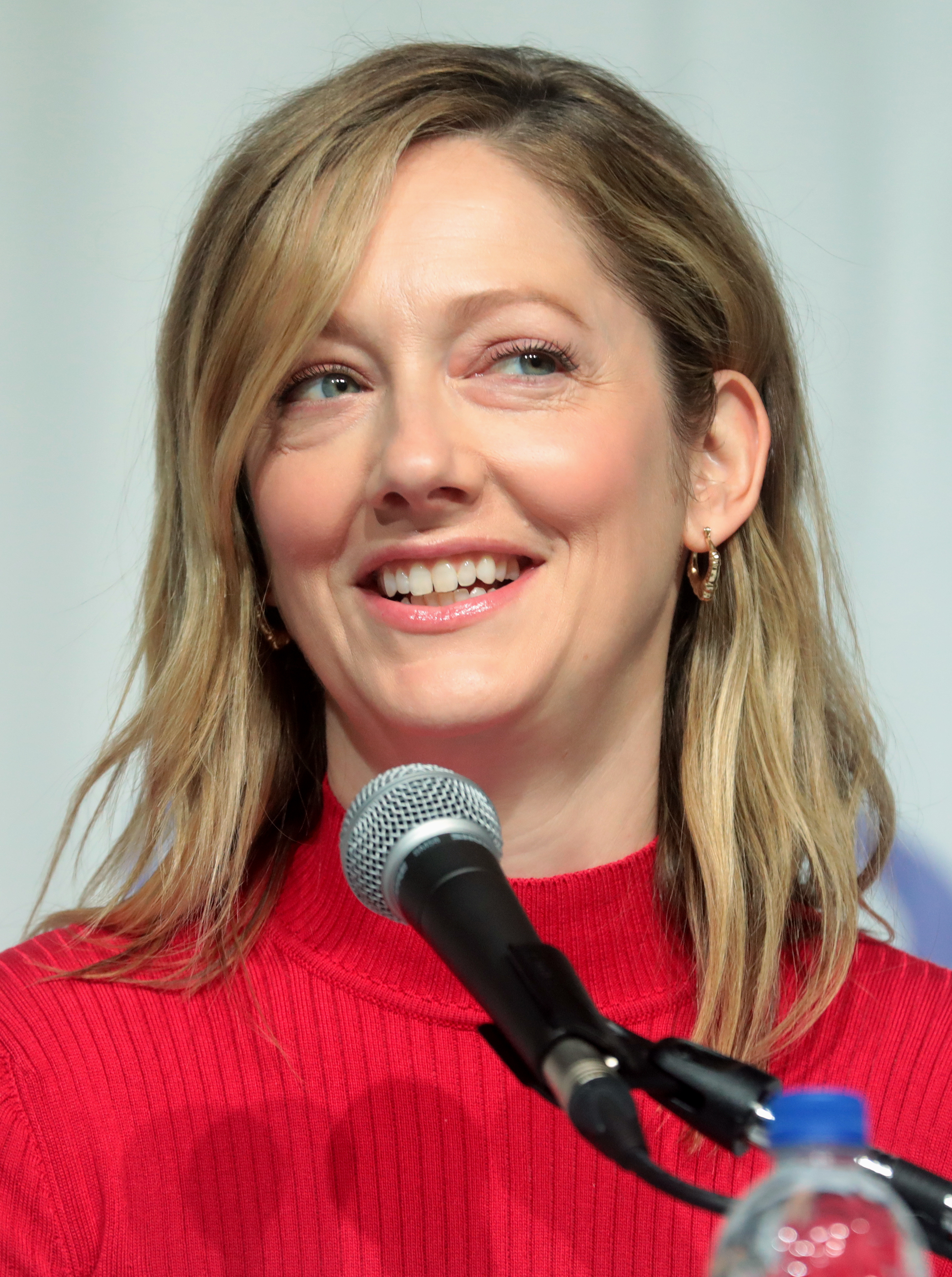
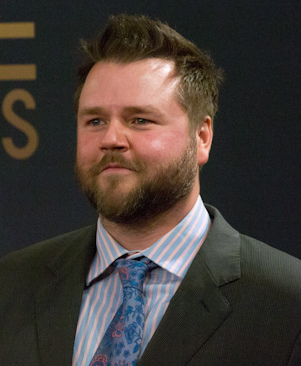
The series starred Jason Biggs (Ben), Sarah Chalke (Kate), Judy Greer (Connie) and Tyler Labine (Larry).

=== Main ===
- Jason Biggs as Ben Parr
- Sarah Chalke as Kate Swanson
- Judy Greer as Connie Grabowski
- Tyler Labine as Larry Munsch

=== Recurring ===
- Sarah Wright as Tiffany McDermott, a rich trophy wife and Connie's employer
- Martin Starr as Clyde, Connie's creepy neighbor
- Chris Parnell as Dennis Barrett, a state trooper and Connie's short-term boyfriend

== Development and production ==
In September 2009, creator Matt Tarses received a new pilot commitment from CBS, and the network green-lit the pilot in January 2010 under the original title True Love. Initial casting announcements begin in February. Minka Kelly was the first actor cast, to play the role of Kate. Ashley Austin Morris joined the cast a few days later as Connie, Kate's cousin and best friend.

In March, Jason Biggs committed to the series to portray Ben. Other casting announcements included Hal Williams, who signed on in early March to play Earl, who works in the observation deck of the Empire State Building where Ben and Kate meet. He was expected to narrate the series, but Tyler Labine ultimately performed that function. Dan Fogler and Sarah Wright were cast a week later. Fogler was added to portray Larry, who is Ben's best friend, with Wright playing Tiffany, a woman who hires Connie to work as a nanny for her children.

Prior to filming the pilot, there were several casting changes. At the end of March, Fogler was replaced by Tyler Labine, who was originally offered the role of Larry but turned it down. In early April, Lizzy Caplan signed on to replace Morris as Connie. The pilot episode was directed by Pamela Fryman.

More casting changes were announced in June. Sarah Chalke joined the cast in the role of Kate, replacing Kelly. A few days later, CBS placed a 13-episode series order. The order was contingent on producers finding a replacement for Caplan, who had only agreed to guest star in the pilot. Caplan described filming the Mad Love pilot as a positive experience, but decided that she preferred and wanted to look for work on shows more similar to her previous series, Party Down. Judy Greer came on board in late June to portray Connie, finalizing the series cast.

== Episodes ==
No.	Title	Directed by	Written by	Original release date	Prod. code	U.S. viewers (millions)
1	"Fireworks"	Pamela Fryman	Matt Tarses	February 14, 2011	001	8.74
Ben and Kate, two single New Yorkers, accidentally meet each other at the top of the Empire State Building and decide to make a date for later that night. Before the date Kate and Ben decide to bring their best friends, Connie and Larry to try and see if they could fall in love too, but after they meet for the first time, they instantly despise each other.
2	"Friends and Other Obstacles"	Scott Ellis	Rob DesHotel	February 21, 2011	002	7.99
Ben and Kate go on their first official date, but Larry and Connie keep getting in the way.
3	"The Kate Gatsby"	Rob Schiller	Adrian Wenner	February 28, 2011	005	7.90
It's Kate's birthday and Ben tries to find the perfect birthday present.
4	"Little Sister, Big City"	Mark Cendrowski	Jared Miller	March 7, 2011	007	7.27
An overprotective Kate seems to forget that her younger sister Julia (Brittany Snow) is no longer a kid. Larry and Connie decide to be each other's wingmen.
5	"To Munsch or Not to Munsch"	Beth McCarthy-Miller	Corey Nickerson	March 14, 2011	004	6.45
Ben helps Connie with her nanny job in an attempt to befriend his girlfriend's best friend. Larry breaks up with women by avoiding them until they leave him, and Kate is determined to change his ways.
6	"The Spy Who Loved Me"	Rob Schiller	Josh Malmuth	March 21, 2011	006	6.53
Kate spies on Ben with the building's security cameras when he's forced to work late nights with an ex-girlfriend, while Larry uses the cameras to track the movements of a mysterious woman.
7	"Baby, You Can Drive My Car"	Beth McCarthy-Miller	Corey Nickerson	March 28, 2011	003	5.54
While on a road trip to sell Ben's car, Kate accidentally crashes the car, forcing everyone to share a room for the night.
8	"Paw and Order"	Beth McCarthy-Miller	Leila Strachan	April 11, 2011	009	5.48
Connie dates a police officer in an attempt to get out of a traffic ticket. Kate accidentally loses her boss's dog.
9	"Pub Quiz"	Lee Shallat-Chemel	Rob Sheridan	April 18, 2011	008	5.62
Ben and Larry are forced to jump through hoops by an obnoxious client. Larry choose to participate in an annual pub quiz instead, risking both the account and his friendship with Ben.
10	"The Young and The Reckless"	Scott Ellis	Rob Sheridan	April 25, 2011	010	5.53
Ben and Kate try to be more spontaneous on a day that Ben has to make an important speech. One thing leads to another and eventually Ben loses his pants, has to wear Larry's suit, and has no copy of his speech. Kate gives Ben his speech but Ben discovers that he doesn't need it. Meanwhile Connie has a book idea which does not go well. She then uses Larry's idea which allows her to come back for another interview. The episode ends with her trying to thank Larry.
11	"The Secret Life of Larry"	Gail Mancuso	Peter Begler	May 2, 2011	011	5.71
When Larry loses Connie's camera they go over the entire city looking for it. Connie is very mad at Larry in the beginning of the day, but soon realizes that he is not all bad.
12	"Friends"	Gail Mancuso	Rob DesHotel	May 9, 2011	012	5.11
When Tiffany decides to leave New York because of her divorce, it means Connie must find a new job.
13	"After The Fireworks"	Gail Mancuso	Adrian Wenner	May 16, 2011	013	5.73
Kate's ex-boyfriend reveals some shocking information that could put her relationship with Ben in jeopardy, and Connie and Larry's fake date takes a very real turn.
