= Zokie of Planet Ruby =

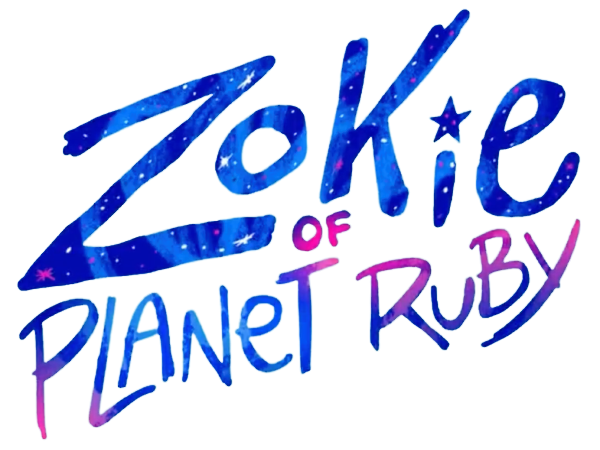
- Genre: Musical comedy
- Created by: Brian Morante
- Directed by: Mike Geiger
- Voices of: Zach Reino; Bahia Watson; Cory Doran; Sabryn Rock; Joshua Graham; Alana Bridgewater; Melissa Altro; Ryan Beil; Sharron Matthews
- Theme music composer: DJ Vekked; Rob Melamed; Ryan McLarnon
- Composers: Liam Clarke; Adrien Gough
- Country of origin: Canada
- Original language: English
- No. of seasons: 1
- No. of episodes: 26 (46 segments)

Production
- Executive producers: Brian Morante; Colin Bohm; Doug Murphy; Pam Westman
- Producers: Tia Menich; Christine Davis
- Editor: Collen McAllister
- Running time: 22 minutes
- Production companies: Nelvana; Corus Entertainment

Original release
- Network: YTV (Canada); Amazon Prime Video (United States)
- Release: December 31, 2023

Zokie of Planet Ruby is a Canadian musical animated comedy television series created by Brian Morante that premiered on Amazon Prime Video on December 31, 2023. The series is directed by Mike Geiger and is produced by Nelvana. The first (and only) season consists of 26 episodes.

== Premise ==
The series is about a 10-year-old vlogger named Ruby who starts a video channel called Planet Ruby. When she discovers that her first follower is a space alien named Zokie Sparkleby, the two become best friends who film their everyday adventures.

== Characters ==
=== Main ===
- Zokie Sparkleby (voiced by Zach Reino) is a short blue alien from Planet Pudge. He decides to stay on Earth with Ruby. He is very outgoing, optimistic, and helpful, but he is also naïve and clueless about Earth.
- Ruby Studebaker (voiced by Bahia Watson) is an excitable young video vlogger who lives in an apartment building. Her channel is called Planet Ruby. When she discovers that Zokie is her only follower, the two become best friends.

=== Recurring ===
- Earl (voiced by Cory Doran) is a cranky, accident-prone red squirrel. He has a selfish and sarcastic demeanor, and finds Zokie and Ruby greatly annoying due to their naïve and childish antics, as well as inadvertently gifting him the ability to talk. He has a habit of eating disgusting things and pulling off cons to get money, which usually painfully backfire on him. He begins dating Konko as of "Love Nuts".
- Dee (voice by Sabryn Rock) and Stan (voiced by Joshua Graham) are Ruby's parents. Both of them work gig jobs that change from episode to episode.
- Grandma Pearl (voiced by Alana Bridgewater) is Ruby's maternal grandmother who loves going to the gym. She is also more tech-savvy than most seniors.
- Tweenkle (voiced by Melissa Altro) is a bratty 15-year-old teenage girl with an extremely popular channel on MeScreen. In "Tweenkle Rebrands", she, as the title suggests, rebrands into Teenkle upon turning 16, eventually becoming the leader of a pack of wolves and leaving her civilized life behind to start anew with them, though she makes one final appearance in "The End Times". Her name is a portmanteau of "tweenager" and "twinkle".
- King Pootywinkle (voiced by Ryan Beil) is the tyrannical, dangerously immature Pomeranian dog king of Zokie's home planet, and the show's primary antagonist.
  - Konko (voiced by Sharron Matthews) is King Pootywinkle's assistant, a seemingly brutish, yet sensitive and soft pink dog-like alien. As of "Love Nuts", she has begun dating Earl.

== Production ==
On March 19, 2021, the series was announced during the 2021 Nickelodeon Upfront under the original title ZJ Sparkleton, which would have debuted in 2022. In January 2022, it was retitled Zokie Sparkleby. In May 2022, the series was once again retitled Zokie of Planet Ruby, and premiered on Amazon Prime Video in the United States on December 31, 2023 with 26 episodes being ordered for the first season. The series made its linear premiere on Nickelodeon on May 10, 2025.

== Episodes ==
No.	Title	Written by	Storyboarded by	Original release date	Nickelodeon air date
1	"The Beginning Times"	Colleen McAllister	Nick Lauer, Brian Morante, Scott O'Brien & Zoë Moss	December 31, 2023	May 10, 2025
When Zokie crashes his spaceship in Ruby's apartment complex, Ruby finally finds her BAF (Best Alien Friend).
2	"More Than a Sandwich"	Colleen McAllister	Kaitlyn Graziano	December 31, 2023	May 17, 2025
2	"Pigeon Enemy #1"	Janae Hall	Tahir Rana	December 31, 2023	May 17, 2025
More Than a Sandwich: Ruby helps Zokie find his true value on Earth when her parents challenge him to do anything but make sandwiches. Pigeon Enemy #1: Ruby and Zokie try to help Earl overcome the pigeon mafia for a dumpster taco.
3	"Extreme Bakeover"	Elliott Maya	Greg Collinson	December 31, 2023	May 24, 2025
3	"The 2nd Follower"	Grant Jossi	Nick Lauer	December 31, 2023	May 24, 2025
Extreme Bakeover: Inspired by Ruby and Zokie to take creative risks, Stan bakes the world's most flavorful cake for a food contest. The 2nd Follower: Ruby tries to impress her mysterious second follower while Tweenkle kidnaps Zokie to eliminate the competition.
4	"Responsible Sleepover"	Janae Hall	Kaitlyn Graziano	December 31, 2023	TBA
4	"The Bolt Strikes Back"	Elliott Maya	Jared Morgan	December 31, 2023	TBA
Responsible Sleepover: Ruby goes to any length to prove to her parents that Zokie is responsible enough to host their first sleepover. The Bolt Strikes Back: Ruby and Zokie inspire the Bolt, a washed-up wrestler, to become king of the ring again.
5	"Entrepren-Earl"	Gloria Shen	Tahir Rana	December 31, 2023	TBA
5	"Lucky Charms"	Elliott Maya	Greg Collinson & Agnes Salek	December 31, 2023	TBA
Entrepren-Earl: Ruby and Zokie use lemonade to boost Ruby's channel...but Earl gets involved. Lucky Charms: Zokie is convinced Ruby's "bad luck" will be the end of her and tries to fix it by capturing a leprechaun.
6	"The Great Tangle"	Janae Hall	Nick Lauer	December 31, 2023	TBA
Zokie zaps Ruby's hair with sparkle magic and they find themselves trapped in a world of tangles.
7	"Toxic Positivity"	Colleen McAllister	Tahir Rana	December 31, 2023	TBA
7	"Lima Bean Farmulator"	Janae Hall	Kaitlyn Graziano	December 31, 2023	TBA
Toxic Positivity: Ruby and Zokie want to help Tweenkle's video director have fun again, but their creative visions are not in sync. Lima Bean Farmulator: Ruby has to overcome her fear of talking to Jeremiah to save Zokie from his addiction to a new video game.
8	"Bedbugs & Breakfast"	Elliott Maya	Nic Parris	December 31, 2023	TBA
8	"Tweenkle Is Cancelled"	Kyle Dooley	Agnes Salek	December 31, 2023	TBA
Bedbugs & Breakfast: Zokie practices hosting by being a perfect host to an insect swarm so he can have the Studebakers over for dinner. Tweenkle Is Cancelled: When Tweenkle's image is tarnished by a bird pooping on her, Ruby and Zokie try in vain to teach her how to be nice.
9	"Horselord"	Sam Ruano	Agnes Salek	December 31, 2023	TBA
9	"Earl Scouts"	Janae Hall	Kaitlyn Graziano & Jared Morgan	December 31, 2023	TBA
Horselord: To avoid being sent back to Pudge, Zokie turns Ruby's landlord's pet Chihuahua into a Pudgian sparkle horse. Earl Scouts: Ruby wants to earn her first Scoutie Scout badge but Earl steps in as her scoutmaster with ZERO survival skills.
10	"Ramp It Up!"	Elliott Maya	Nic Parris	December 31, 2023	TBA
10	"Sponsor Surprise"	Philippa Marvin	Nick Lauer	December 31, 2023	TBA
Ramp It Up!: Ruby tries to impress her cool cousin Kiki while Zokie tries to match Ruby's relatives' way of showing affection. Sponsor Surprise: Ruby and Zokie accidentally get a sponsor package meant for Tweenkle.
11	"A Brox Tale"	Grant Jossi	Agnes Salek	December 31, 2023	TBA
11	"The Motherloaf"	Elliott Maya	Jared Morgan	December 31, 2023	TBA
A Brox Tale: Trying to prove that they're ready to care for an Earth pet, Ruby and Zokie decide to care for Brox's shed skin. The Motherloaf: Ruby and Zokie's messiness creates the MOTHERLOAF, an insatiable dough-monster who feeds on their messes.
12	"Full Shade"	Janae Hall	Nic Parris	December 31, 2023	TBA
12	"Who's Your Daddy?"	Cheryl Meyer & Kara Harun	Danny Ducker	December 31, 2023	TBA
Full Shade: Worried Grandma Pearl is a murderous horticulturist, Ruby and Zokie try to discover what shady business she's actually into. Who's Your Daddy?: Zokie tortures Earl in his idiotic attempts to make father-son bonding memories with him.
13	"Dough-Not"	Janae Hall	Agnes Salek	December 31, 2023	TBA
13	"Jurassic Prank"	Colleen McAllister	Jared Morgan	December 31, 2023	TBA
Dough-Not: Ruby and Zokie's friendship is strained when they discover that they disagree on certain things. Jurassic Prank: Ruby, Zokie and Dee come together to prank Stan, who claims if dinosaurs came back to life, he wouldn't be scared.
14	"The Closet of Doom"	Elliott Maya	Nic Parris	December 31, 2023	TBA
14	"Ghost Encounters"	Janae Hall	Amie Sanchez	December 31, 2023	TBA
The Closet of Doom: Ruby and Zokie accidentally shrink themselves while hunting for Dee's lost earring in Ruby's messy closet. Ghost Encounters: Ruby and Zokie try to de-haunt the haunted laundry room when Ruby loses yet another sock to it.
15	"Turkeydactyl"	Elliott Maya	Nic Parris & Jared Morgan	December 31, 2023	TBA
Ruby wants Zokie to try both her favorite Thanksgiving desserts, causing her grandmothers to fight for pie dominance.
16	"Power Suit"	Kyle Dooley	David Bluestein	December 31, 2023	TBA
16	"What's Kraken on Pudge?"	Colleen McAllister	Agnes Salek	December 31, 2023	TBA
Power Suit: Ruby loses herself when Zokie zaps her Power Suit to make her feel more confident at Jeremiah's pool party. What's Kraken on Pudge?: Sentinel Gorp goes on an epic quest to find a cute and angry leader for the Pudgian throne to replace King Pootywinkle.
17	"Deus Ex Broxina"	Janae Hall	Greg Collinson, Alice Liu & Roxanne Matrix	December 31, 2023	TBA
17	"Virtually Reality"	Jeff Sager	Julien Dufour	December 31, 2023	TBA
Deus Ex Broxina: Ruby and Zokie unintentionally turn a deadly space parasite into a new fad, causing havoc at the local mall. Virtually Reality: Ruby and Zokie have to sacrifice a good review from Caldwell in order to save Planet Pudge from destruction.
18	"Oddly Satisfying"	Michelle McGee	Amie Sanchez	December 31, 2023	TBA
18	"Mayor CATastrophe"	Philippa Marvin	Amie Sanchez	December 31, 2023	TBA
Oddly Satisfying: Ruby and Zokie find the most satisfying sound in the universe, but it's too satisfying and puts everyone to sleep. Mayor CATastrophe: While filming an investigative piece on the election, Ruby and Zokie accidentally turn the mayor into a cat.
19	"Hot Pudge Sludge Day"	Elliott Maya	Mike Geiger, Greg Collinson & Alice Liu	December 31, 2023	TBA
19	"Love Nuts"	Sam Ruano	Jessica Borutski	December 31, 2023	TBA
Hot Pudge Sludge Day: Ruby and Zokie try to recreate a Pudgian holiday on Earth, without putting anyone at risk in the process. Love Nuts: Ruby and Zokie set up a blind date for Earl and Konko, who thinks the date is with Zokie.
20	"Los Muchos Amores de Earl"	Dan Dillabough	Nic Parris	December 31, 2023	TBA
20	"Tweenkle Rebrands"	Philippa Marvin	Julien Dufour	December 31, 2023	TBA
Los Muchos Amores de Earl: Ruby and Zokie take advantage of Earl's lucid dreaming by making him star in a soap-opera show for the neighbors. Tweenkle Rebrands: Tweenkle turns 16 and decides to rebrand her image, while Ruby and Zokie try to return her lost cellphone.
21	"Holiday Humbug"	Janae Hall & Elliott Maya	Amie Sanchez & Nic Parris	December 31, 2023	TBA
In a spin on A Christmas Carol, Ruby and Zokie try and reinvigorate Earl's holiday spirit when they find out he hates the holidays.
22	"Dazzling Dee"	Elliott Maya	Jeff Barker	December 31, 2023	TBA
22	"Anti-Scooper" "All-American Anti-Scooper"	Lauren Shell	Julien Dufour	December 31, 2023	TBA
Dazzling Dee: Dee, who is now a magician, is working on disappearing mid-act, so Ruby and Zokie help find her inner magic to save the show. Anti-Scooper: Ruby and Zokie make a true crime documentary, ready to do what it takes to expose an anti-poop-scooping pet owner.
23	"Unboxing"	Brian Morante	Brian Morante	December 31, 2023	TBA
23	"Zokie Sparkleby: The Most Perfect Earthling"	Philippa Marvin	Sarah Jane Kinney	December 31, 2023	TBA
Unboxing: Ruby and Zokie make an unboxing video to get the people of Earth to appreciate Ruby's creative genius. Zokie Sparkleby: The Most Perfect Earthling: Zokie sets out to become normal when he thinks his alienness might be causing problems for the Studebakers. It works, but Ruby isn't happy with the results.
24	"RadicalCon"	Johnny LaZebnik	Amie Sanchez & Nic Parris	December 31, 2023	TBA
When they get separated from one another at RadicalCon, Ruby must embark on a quest to find Zokie (and prove that their friendship is epic), while Zokie is mistaken for a popular celebrity.
25	"Shut This Ship Down"	Janae Hall	Greg Collinson, Alice Liu & Heather Shanahan	December 31, 2023	TBA
25	"The Tooth Taker"	Elliott Maya	Jeff Barker	December 31, 2023	TBA
Shut This Ship Down: Ruby and Zokie team up with an unlikely duo to stop Zokie's ship from destroying all things imperfect on Earth. The Tooth Taker: While Earl finds his next big con, Ruby and Zokie attempt to capture Ruby's worst enemy: the Tooth Fairy.
26	"The End Times"	Colleen McAllister	Mike Geiger & Brian Morante	December 31, 2023	TBA
On the night Ruby gets the chance to trick-or-treat with Jeremiah and Zokie, Halloween festivities in Tres Leches come to a sudden halt when government agents descend on the town, hunting for a dangerous alien, powerful enough to destroy Earth.
