= This Sounds Serious =

Satirical crime podcast

- Genre: Fictional Comedy True Crime
- Running time: 10 - 40 minutes
- Country of origin: Canada
- Language: English
- Hosted by: Pat Kelly; Peter Oldring
- Created by: Kelly & Kelly; Peter Oldring; Dave Shumka
- Executive producers: Kelly & Kelly; Peter Oldring; Dave Shumka
- Recording studio: Vancouver, Canada
- Original release: April 1, 2018
- Website: www.thissoundsserious.com
- Podcast: castbox.fm/..

This Sounds Serious is a Castbox original fictional, comedic true crime podcast that debuted on April 1, 2018. The podcast, now in its third season, is a "parody anthology of sorts" that follows a different fake, satirical crime every season through investigative radio journalist Gwen Radford (voiced by Carly Pope).

Created and produced by Kelly & Kelly, an award-winning studio founded by Chris Kelly and Pat Kelly, the podcast was rated by Apple Podcasts as one of the 'Best Podcasts of 2018'.

== Content ==
The podcast pays homage to true crime storytelling through its use of familiar styles, tones and tropes of popular crime podcasts and Netflix documentaries.

=== Season 1: The Case of Chuck Bronstadt ===
In Season 1, Gwen tackles the complicated and bizarre story of Chuck Bronstadt, a famous local weather man in Florida that was found dead in his water bed.

=== Season 2: Missing Melissa ===
Gwen searches for Melissa Turner, the country's most missing person, who has disappeared under extremely strange circumstances. Meanwhile, 400 miles away, Jimmy Kline is staging the longest bank robbery in Oregon history. In this second season, Gwen spots a connection between these two seemingly isolated incidents—uncovering a mystery that appears to end in murder.

=== Season 3: Grand Casino ===
Starting with a 911 call about a heart attack at a film premiere, Gwen investigates Hollywood producer and conman Kirk Todd and his 1991 film Grand Casino, "the greatest movie never made". She talks with reporters and Todd's colleagues and victims to uncover the truth three decades later.

== In the media ==
In 2018, Vulture recommended that This Sounds Serious be added to the top of summer podcast binge list. Vulture further described the production team of Kelly & Kelly as "really [having] an ear for parody". Sarah Berman of Vice commended the This Sounds Serious crew for "blending [the] absurd and [the] believable in their own strange and Canadian way". While Sarah Griffin of The Irish Times praised the authenticity of This Sounds Serious production, citing its convincing archival footage, "earnest" and "committed" performances by cast members, "considered audio design" and its "subtle soundscape". Exclaim magazine further praised This Sounds Serious, stating that "the creators nail every nuance of this genre. It got so real, some people honestly thought this ridiculous story was true."

In 2019, IndieWire reported on This Sounds Serious, as part of Podcast Week—a week dedicated to taking a deeper look at some of the best podcasts of 2019. Steve Greene of IndieWire praised This Sounds Serious for getting "about as close to the "real thing" as a scripted series can get", stating that "none of those [podcast-specific parody] shows have tapped into the sounds and rhythms of true crime quite like This Sounds Serious".
