= Jay Arner =

Canadian musician, producer, and singer-songwriter

- Origin: Vancouver, British Columbia, Canada
- Genres: Indie pop; synth-pop; indie rock
- Occupations: Musician; singer-songwriter; record producer
- Instruments: Vocals; guitar; synthesizer; multi-instrumentalist
- Years active: 2013–present
- Labels: Mint Records, We Are Time Records
- Member of: Energy Slime
- Website: jayarner.bandcamp.com

Jay Arner is a Canadian multi-instrumentalist, singer-songwriter, and record producer based in Vancouver, British Columbia. She is known for her solo work on Mint Records and as one half of the synth-pop duo Energy Slime alongside wife Jessica Delisle. She has also worked extensively as a producer and engineer at Hive Studios in Vancouver, recording artists such as Mount Eerie, Apollo Ghosts, and Rose Melberg.

== Music career ==
Arner spent years as a sought-after producer and collaborator, including playing and producing for indie music groups like International Falls, The Poison Dart, Bleeding Hearts, and Fine Mist, before releasing her self-titled debut solo album in June 2013 on Mint Records. This followed signing for the record label in April 2013. The album was recorded entirely by Arner in a 72-square-foot practice space using a home desktop computer and DIY recording gear, and was described as showcasing her abilities as a multi-instrumentalist and established her as one of Vancouver's most distinctive indie-pop voices. She told Exclaim! that the album was a "pretty good document" of her identity, and how she interpreted herself through music, while hoping that listeners gained "a sense of Jay-ness...[and] understanding". She later toured Canada in summer 2024 and released a 13-minute song named "New Dimensional" in early 2015. Prior to this, Arner went on a tour across North America from February to March 2014.

Her second solo album, Jay II, was released on June 17, 2016, via Mint Records and received a 7.0 rating from Pitchfork. The record was described as "sophisticated synth-pop for sensitive types, existential glam rock for the unsettled." The release of this album followed traveling across Canada with the band, Supermoon, and then a North American tour in the fall of 2016.

Following Jay II, Arner shifted her primary musical output to Energy Slime, the duo she formed with partner Jessica Delisle. This included the release of new songs, such as a single entitled "It's Cold" in 2017, and a music tour across Canada in fall 2017.

In November 2019, Arner released Jay III, on cassette and in digital form, and said to be a departure from the "hook-loaded pop" of her previous album. The following year, Arner and Delisle released a music video for a pop song entitled "Bongo Dance."

In 2023, Arner did the production for Dan Colussi's jazz rock album, "Eight Waves in Search of an Ocean."

In the summer of 2025, Arner removed all her music from Spotify despite receiving "A-list royalties" from the music streaming service. In October 2025, Arner told Exclaim! that she did this due to the platform's involvement with Helsing, a German defence technology company that uses artificial intelligence software designed to enhance weapons systems and improve battlefield decision-making. She described the boycott of the platform as a "good use of what little power working-class musicians have" while hoping that listeners would "move on to something more supportive of artists."

In 2026, it was noted that Arner did work on the EP, "Star of the Show", of music artist Future Star.

== Energy Slime ==
Energy Slime is a minimal synth and indie-pop duo composed of Jay Arner and Jessica Delisle, both based in Vancouver. The project began in 2014 with the release of an EP, followed by further releases on Mint Records. Their debut full-length album, Planet Perfect, was released on August 9, 2024, via We Are Time Records, and was praised for its sophisticated production and musical composition. The album was shaped in part by the couple spending the pandemic period layering overdubs and synthesizer sounds in their Vancouver apartment, where they also live, write, and shoot music videos.

== Personal life ==
Arner is a trans woman who publicly came out as transgender around the time of Planet Perfect's 2024 release. She began her transition several months before the album came out, and has described the experience positively: "I love it. I've been taking estrogen." Arner has reflected that her sense of gender identity had persisted since childhood, but that growing up in the 1980s and 1990s, "it wasn't really part of the conversation at that time." She is married to Jessica Delisle, her bandmate in Energy Slime, who has publicly identified as bisexual. In March 2025, Delisle launched a crowdfunding campaign on GoFundMe to raise money to cover the financial costs Arner's gender-affirming care, with other music artists later holding a benefit concert for Arner in October 2025 to raise more money to support this campaign.

== Critical reception ==
Arner's debut solo album was reviewed by Exclaim!, Canada's leading independent music magazine, which praised it as the work of a "pop savant" delivering "Kevin Barnes-indebted wails" and "Beach Boys-inspired harmonies." CBC music critic Andrea Warner called Arner "a fantastic musician, songwriter, and producer," noting her singles were receiving attention from SPIN and Exclaim! and charting on CBC Radio 3. Jay II received a 7.0 rating from Pitchfork and was described as "sophisticated synth-pop for sensitive types, existential glam rock for the unsettled." Exclaim! also profiled Energy Slime's debut full-length Planet Perfect (2024), featuring an in-depth interview with Arner and Delisle about the album's creation and Arner's gender transition.

== Discography ==
=== Solo ===
| Year | Title | Label |
|---|---|---|
| 2013 | Jay Arner | Mint Records |
| 2016 | Jay II | Mint Records |
| 2019 | Jay III | Mint Records |

=== Energy Slime ===
| Year | Title | Label |
|---|---|---|
| 2014 | New Dimensional (EP) | Mint Records |
| 2024 | Planet Perfect | We Are Time Records |
