= Little Mountain Gallery =

Comedy club in Vancouver, British Columbia

Coordinates: 49.2838772°N 123.10687°W

- Interactive map of Little Mountain Gallery
- Address: 110 Water Street; Vancouver; Canada
- Location: Vancouver, British Columbia, Canada
- Operator: Ehren Salazar (2006–2013); Ryan Beil (2013–2017); Brent Constantine (2017–present)
- Type: Comedy club

Construction
- Opened: 2006 (20 years ago)
- Closed: 2021-12-31
- Reopened: 2023-02-18
- Years active: 2006–2021 2023–present

Website
- littlemountaingallery.ca

Little Mountain Gallery is a community not-for-profit comedy club in Gastown, Vancouver where comedians perform stand-up, improv, and sketch comedy.

The venue was originally established in 2006 by Ehren Salazar in Mount Pleasant.

It is known its unique showcasing of alternative comedy and full community programming and operation. Notable shows at Little Mountain Gallery include 24-hour long charity shows by Graham Clark.

== History ==
=== Founding and Mount Pleasant location ===
Ehren Salazar established Little Mountain Gallery in 2006 in a former auto garage at 26th Avenue and Main Street in Vancouver's Little Mountain neighbourhood.

=== Eviction ===
It was located between residential and commercial buildings. In 2010, the venue faced threats of closure due to zoning issues and noise complaints.

In 2019, Matthew Cheng Development Inc announced its application to redevelop the space. In November 2021, Little Mountain Gallery announced its resulting eviction, which took place on December 31, 2021.

The renoviction prompted community discussion about the future of comedy in the city amidst concerns regarding the viability of reopening the space. Fundraising efforts were quickly set in motion for its relocation, including a 24-hour stand-up comedy "marathon" fundraiser by Graham Clark.

=== Reopening in Gastown ===
The venue received its licence to sell alcohol just before its reopening. On February 18, 2023, Little Mountain Gallery reopened in Gastown following another 24-hour stand-up show by Clark to raise awareness and funds for the new location.

It is now located in Gastown at 110 Water Street between Cambie Street and Abbott Street.

== Operations ==
In 2013, Ryan Beil took over from Salazar and ran the space until 2017. Brent Constantine has been the executive director since 2016. It is being booked by Niki Mohrdar.

== Notable performances ==
=== Graham Clark's 24 Hours of Stand-Up ===
Comedian Graham Clark has done four 24-hour stand-up comedy marathons at Little Mountain Gallery to raise money for local causes and the space itself. At the original Little Mountain location in 2019, Clark performed 24 hours of stand-up comedy to fundraise for the Stephen Lewis Foundation for young people living with HIV and AIDS. When Little Mountain Gallery announced its eviction in 2021, Clark returned to raise money for their reestablishment at a new location.

On April 12 2024, when Little Mountain Gallery reopened, Clark performed another 24 Hours of Stand-Up to fund its reopening and spread awareness of the Gastown location. In 2025, the venue hosted another of Clark's stand-up comedy marathons, raising funds for Vancouver's Filipino community following the Lapu Lapu festival attack.

=== Other notable performers ===
Popular established comedians frequently perform at Little Mountain Gallery, including Brent Butt, Charlie Demers, Ivan Decker, Sophie Buddle, Jon Dore, Cass Furman, and Chris Locke.

Andrea Jin's Juno Award-winning 2020 album Grandma's Girl was recorded at Little Mountain Gallery on January 31, 2020.
