= South by Southwest London =

Film, music and tech festival in London, England

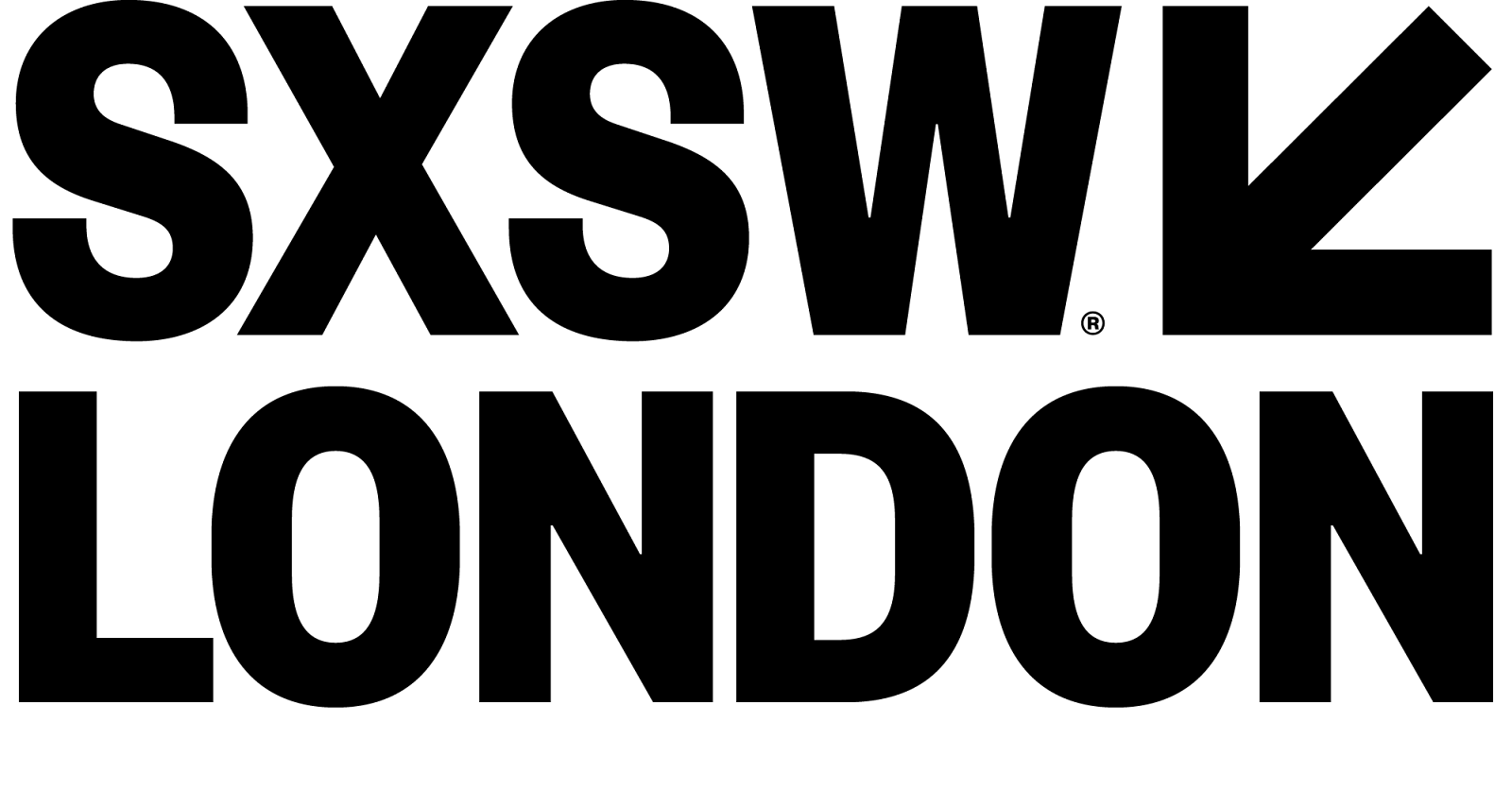
- Logo since 2025.

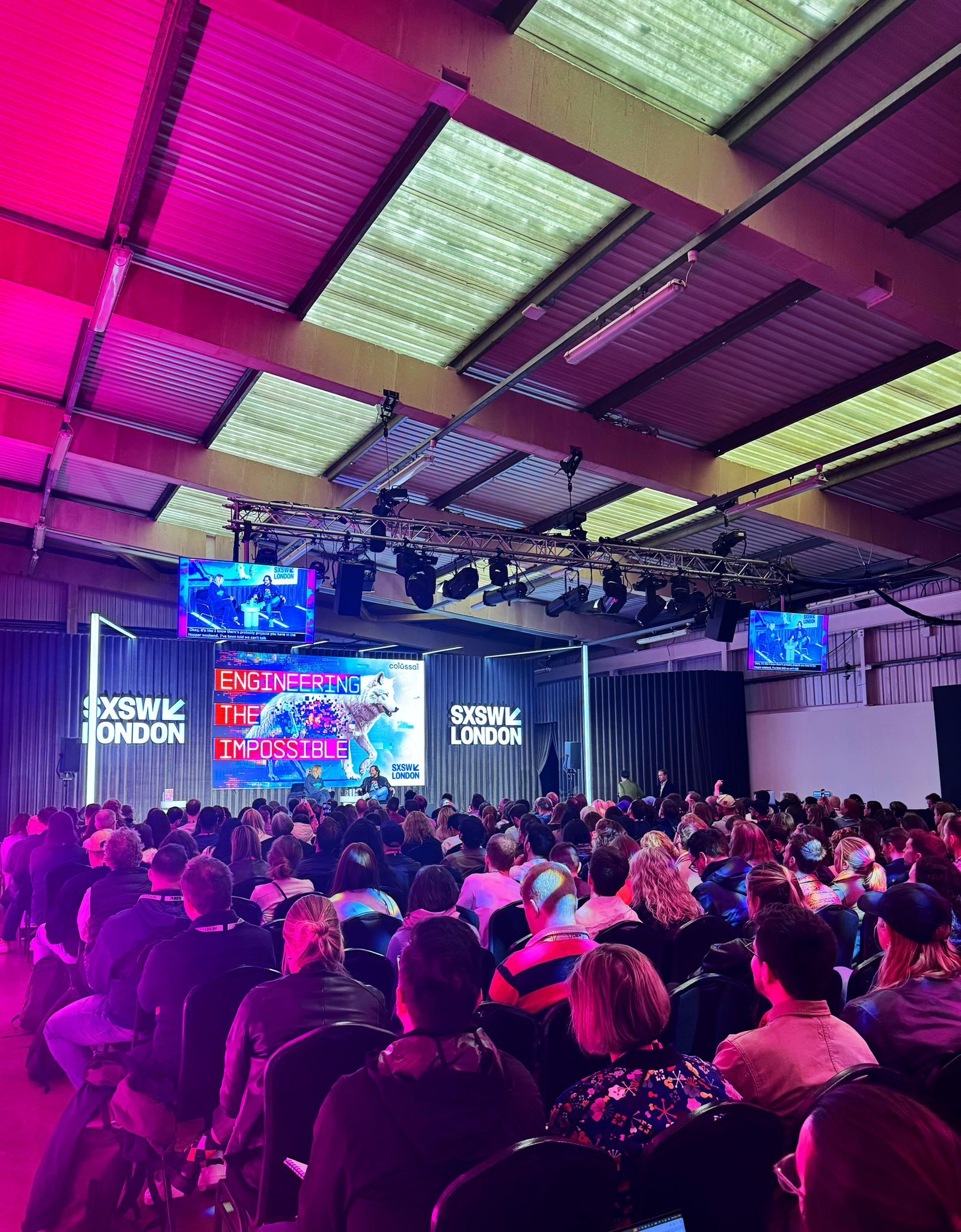
- Crowd at SXSW London 2025.
- Genre: Conference and festival
- Dates: June (dates vary)
- Frequency: Annual
- Locations: London, England
- Years active: 1
- Inaugurated: 2 June 2025
- Organizer: SXSW, LLC
- Website: sxswlondon.com

South by Southwest London (SXSW London) is a music, film and technology festival hosted in Shoreditch and Hoxton areas of London, England. Its programming includes live music, keynote speeches, panel discussions and other kinds of events.

Inaugurated in 2025 with a specific emphasis on artificial intelligence, SXSW London is the first European iteration of the South by Southwest festival annually hosted in Austin, Texas, United States.

== History ==
SXSW first began in Austin, Texas, United States, in 1987 as a multimedia festival with music, film and technology programming. Since then, the festival has been restructured and managed by the Penske Media Corporation, with festival offshoots, like SXSW Sydney, being operated in order to help "the bottom line" following financial difficulties during and after the COVID-19 pandemic.

SXSW executive vice president Darin Klein stated that "The U.K. has a huge creator economy" as a reason for expanding the festival to London. The first SXSW London festival was launched in 2025 and was scheduled to run from 2–7 June. On the first day, London mayor Sadiq Khan delivered a kickoff speech, and guest speakers included Sir Demis Hassabis, Beeple, Katherine Ryan, Peter Kyle, Dan Clancy and Sir Tony Blair. Films, such as the Eminem documentary Stans, were due to premiere at the Barbican Centre. Musical acts like Tems, Alice Glass and Mabel headlined the music programme. Over 25 venues across East London, with hundreds of events total, were tapped for festival programming. King Charles attended on 3 June 2025.

The inaugural 2025 event was marred with boycotts from artists LVRA, Sam Akpro, Blood of Azra and other due to the participation of former Prime Ministers David Cameron and Tony Blair, alongside complaints from attendees on the event management with regards to queues, the number of sessions available to attend and the event app.

In June 2026 Hasan Piker and Cenk Uygur were scheduled to speak at SXSW London but were prevented from traveling by the UK government. SXSW released a statement stating that the issue was "a matter for the Home Office", which Piker described as "disgusting". Ash Sarkar, who was due to chair the discussion, withdrew from the festival and criticised its lack of "defence of lawful free expression".
