= Graham Clark (comedian) =

Canadian comedian, podcaster, and philanthropist

- Born: 1980 or 1981; Calgary, Alberta
- Occupations: Comedian; writer; podcaster
- Years active: 2005–present
- Organization: Maximum Fun
- Agent: Paquin Entertainment
- Spouse(s): Sally White, 2023–present
- Awards: 2012 Canadian Comedy Awards Best Podcast - Stop Podcasting Yourself; 2013 Canadian Comedy Awards Best Podcast - Stop Podcasting Yourself; 2014 Canadian Comedy Awards Best Audio Show or Series - Stop Podcasting Yourself; 2019 Vancouver Comedy Awards Best Headliner - Best Crowd Work - Best Twitter Account
- Website: beardpaintings.tumblr.com

Graham Clark (born 1980 or 1981) is a Canadian stand-up comedian and philanthropist from Vancouver, British Columbia. He is best known for pioneering podcasting as the co-host of Stop Podcasting Yourself and his 24-hour charity fundraisers, Graham Clark's 24 Hours of Stand-Up.

Clark is also a producer and regular guest on the CBC Radio One's comedy program The Debaters.

== Early life ==
Clark grew up in Calgary before moving to Vancouver in 2000.

He was an independent candidate in the 2009 British Columbia general election, running in Vancouver-Fairview.

== Comedy career ==
In 2001, Clark started hosting The Laugh Gallery, a weekly stand-up show at El Cocal restaurant in East Vancouver. The Laugh Gallery moved across the street in 2006 to Rime, then down Commercial Drive to Havana, and finally relocated to its current home at Little Mountain Gallery following the venue's reopening in Gastown.

On June 7, 2008, Clark appeared on The Debaters for the first time.

Tragedy Plus Time, his comedy blog column for Vancouver Is Awesome, ran from July 7, 2010 until March 24, 2011.

On April 12, 2016, Clark was named one of the National Post's "Eight Extraordinary Canadians."

At the 2019 Vancouver Comedy Awards. Clark received Best Crowd Work, Best Twitter Account, Best Comedy Parent, Best Local Headliner, Best Local Host / MC, as well as Best Comedy Podcast for SPY.

He released his album, Never Was, on October 31st 2023, and received a nomination for Comedy Album of the Year at the Juno Awards of 2024.

=== Television ===
In 2008, Clark won Yuk Yuk's Great Canadian Laugh Off. He was a host of Citytv's satirical news show The CityNews List from 2009 until its cancellation in the 2010 Rogers Media layoffs. He appeared in season 1, episode 6 of HBO Canada's Funny as Hell in 2011.

Clark did punch-up writing on the first three seasons of Corner Gas Animated, from 2018 to 2020.

From 2018-2019, Clark was a West Coast correspondent on season 26 of This Hour Has 22 Minutes.

==== Writing ====
| Year | Title | Notes | Ref |
|---|---|---|---|
| 2018-2020 | Corner Gas Animated | punch-up writer and creative consultant | |
| 2018 | This Hour Has 22 Minutes | | |
| 2013 | The Stand-Up Comedians | | |
| 2011 | The Debaters (TV Show) | | |
| 2011 | Funny As Hell | | |
| 2006 | Comedy Now! | | |

=== Fringe festivals ===
Clark has premiered multiple shows at various fringe festivals. In 2015, he performed Graham Clark Reads the Phone Book at the Toronto Fringe Festival and the Edinburgh Festival Fringe. In 2016, he returned to the Toronto Fringe with his show Instagraham. In 2018, he brought his show Graham Clark's Not Here to the Winnipeg Fringe Theatre Festival.

== Stop Podcasting Yourself ==
In 2008, Clark was invited by his friend Dave Shumka to start a podcast in Shumka's basement studio. Stop Podcasting Yourself accidentally invented the chat show format, and was a quick success.

He and Shumka met Jesse Thorn and joined the Maximum Fun network in 2011.

Shumka and Clark were nominated for, and won Best Podcast twice at the Canadian Comedy Awards, in 2012 and 2013 in recognition of Stop Podcasting Yourself. They also won the Canadian Comedy Award for Best Audio Show or Series in 2014.

The podcast has been recorded live at festivals such as Just for Laughs.

Stop Podcasting Yourself celebrated 500 episodes in 2017, and its 10th anniversary in 2018.

== Philanthropy ==
=== Beard paintings ===
In 2011, Clark began selling "beard paintings" painted using his iconic beard as a brush, for various causes. His original beard paintings raised $5000 for a friend battling cancer. His beard paintings have since benefitted earthquake relief efforts by GlobalMedic, Oxfam’s East Africa famine relief, Adsum for Women and Children, the Vancouver Food Bank, the Save the Rio Theatre Campaign, Charitable Impact, Alberta flood relief, Megaphone Magazine, the Downtown Eastside Women’s Emergency Shelter, Small Talk, and to purchase a new wheelchair for fellow Vancouver comedian Ryan Lachance.

=== Graham Clark's 24 Hours of Stand-Up ===
Clark has done four 24-hour stand-up comedy marathons to raise money for local causes and the arts. In 2019, he did 24 hours of stand-up at Little Mountain Gallery to raise money for the Stephen Lewis Foundation for young people living with HIV and AIDS. When the local comedy venue announced its eviction later in 2021, Clark returned to raise money for their relocation.

When Little Mountain Gallery reopened April 12 2024, Clark did another 24-hour fundraiser to fund its opening and build awareness of the new location. In 2025, his stand-up comedy marathon raised funds for Vancouver's Filipino community following the Lapu Lapu festival attack.

=== Other charity shows ===
May 21, 2021, Clark raised money for global vaccine equity in a virtual comedy show for Partners In Health.

In July 2024, Clark participated in Erica Sigurdson's "Feed Our Neighbours" comedy fundraiser.

On February 6, 2026, Clark performed "Comedy for a Cause" at the Queen's Theatre in Nanaimo, British Columbia, with partial proceeds benefiting the Billon Foundation.

== Personal life ==
Clark is allergic to peanuts, gluten, and dairy. He is a vegetarian.

He eloped with journalist Sally White in Las Vegas in 2023.
