= Let's Make =

Canadian podcast about screenwriting

Let's Make (stylized as Let's Make a...) is a podcast hosted by comedians Ryan Beil, Maddy Kelly, and Mark Chavez with production by Kelly & Kelly and the CBC. In each season, the hosts attempt to write a script for a specific genre of television show or film.

== Background ==
=== Let's Make a Sci-fi ===
Season one was called Let's Make a Sci-fi and was produced by Vancouver-based production studio Kelly & Kelly with the CBC. The first season is composed of eight episodes. Each episode is 30 minutes in length. The show is hosted by comedians Ryan Beil, Maddy Kelly, and Mark Chavez. The hosts record themselves as they try to create a script for a sci-fi television show or film. The season won a Webby Award for best Limited Series in 2023.

=== Let's Make a Rom Com ===
The second season was called Let's Make a Rom Com and followed the same hosts as they attempted to write a Rom Com. The season debuted on Valentine's day 2023. The show includes discussions between the hosts as they write a Rom Com as well as interviews with people who have experience with the genre. The second season also contained eight 30-minute episodes.

=== Let's Make a Horror ===
The third season was called Let's Make a Horror. The season follows the hosts as they attempt to write a script for a horror film. The third season was 10 episodes long.
