= Whistle & Trick =

Australian children's music group

Whistle & Trick are an ARIA Award nominated Australian children's music group composed of childhood friends Esther Holt and Maddy Kelly, based in Melbourne, Australia.

== Biography ==
Holt and Kelly's initial connection was forged during their time together in their high school choir, laying the early foundations for their future musical partnership. Years later, their shared passion for music and a desire to create something special for children led them to reunite and form Whistle & Trick.

Signed with ABC Music, Whistle & Trick have released two albums supported by music video clips. Their debut album, 'Bananas and Other Delicious Things', released in June 2023, showcased collaborations with notable Australian artists such as Allday, Vika and Linda, Paul Kelly (Maddy Kelly's father) and Memphis LK (Maddy Kelly's sister).

Their second album, 'Space Fish', released in November 2024, features guest vocals from Brian Nankervis, Alex Lahey, and Andrea and Valunga Khoza, continuing their tradition of collaboration and imaginative storytelling through music.

== Discography ==
=== Albums ===
Title	Info
Bananas and Other Delicious Things	Released: 18 June 2023; Label: ABC Music
Space Fish	Released: 14 November 2024; Label: ABC Music

=== Singles ===
Title	Year
"Shiver Me Timbers"	2023
"Thinking About the Things"	2023
"Bananas and Other Delicious Things"	2023
"Just a Song About Cats" (with The Quokkas)	2024
"Rain Rain"	2024
"Morning Song"	2024
"I Love My Family"	2024
"Bubbles"	2024

=== Music Videos ===
Whistle & Trick have released two series of music videos in conjunction with the ABC which support the songs on their albums.

== Awards and nominations ==
=== AIR Awards ===
The Australian Independent Record Awards (commonly known informally as AIR Awards) is an annual awards night to recognise, promote and celebrate the success of Australia's Independent Music sector.

Year	Nominee / work	Award	Result	Ref.
2024	Bananas And Other Delicious Things	Best Independent Children's Album or EP	Nominated	

=== ARIA Music Awards ===
The ARIA Music Awards is an annual awards ceremony that recognises excellence, innovation, and achievement across all genres of Australian music.

Year	Nominee / work	Award	Result	Ref.
2023	Bananas And Other Delicious Things	Best Children's Album	Nominated	
