= Castbox =

Hong Kong–based podcast company

- Type: Private
- Industry: Podcasting
- Founded: 2016
- Founder: Renee Wang
- Headquarters: San Francisco
- Website: castbox.fm

Castbox (Chinese: 鑄造箱) is a Hong Kong–based podcast company. The company both hosts and produces its own podcasts.

== Founding ==
Castbox was founded in 2016 by company CEO Renee Wang in Beijing, China. It also has offices in San Francisco and Hong Kong.

== App ==
Castbox is an app that distributes free podcasts. By 2019, one million podcasts had been made available through Castbox, including about fifty million podcast episodes. Castbox also has a premium platform. In June 2019, Castbox integrated with Waze, allowing playback controls to pause, skip, or restart episodes.

== Podcasts ==
In addition to its library of podcasts from other distributors, Castbox also produces its own shows. In 2018, Castbox partnered with Heard Well on the podcast series Heard Well Now, which highlights early career musical artists. As of 2018, Castbox produced 25 different original podcasts, with This Sounds Serious being released in 2019.

== Funding ==
In 2017, the company raised $16 million, and an additional $13.5 million in 2018.
