= 2025 Vancouver car attack =

Vehicle ramming attack in British Columbia, Canada

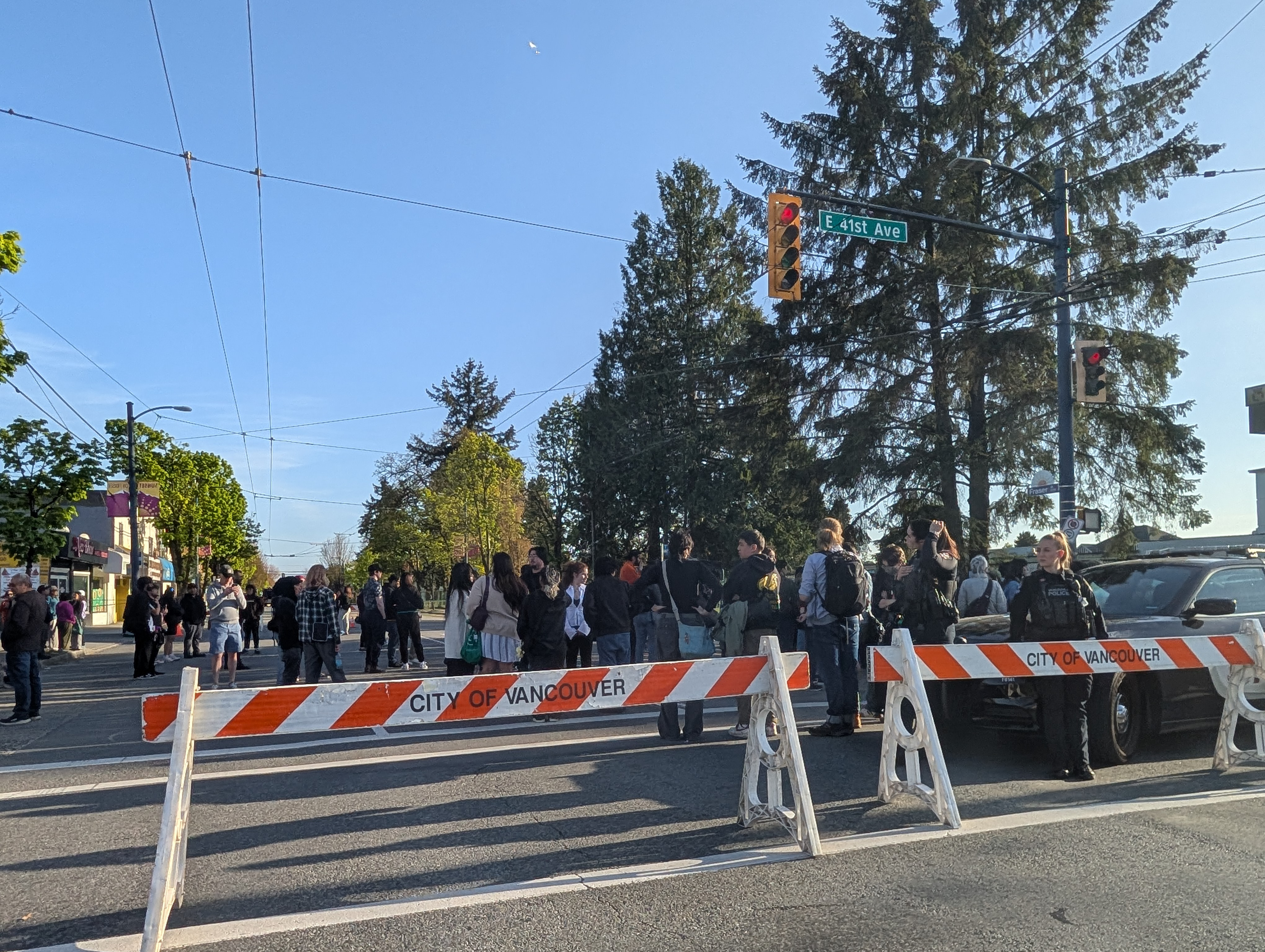
- Fraser Street south of East 41st Avenue on April 27, 2025, the day after the attack

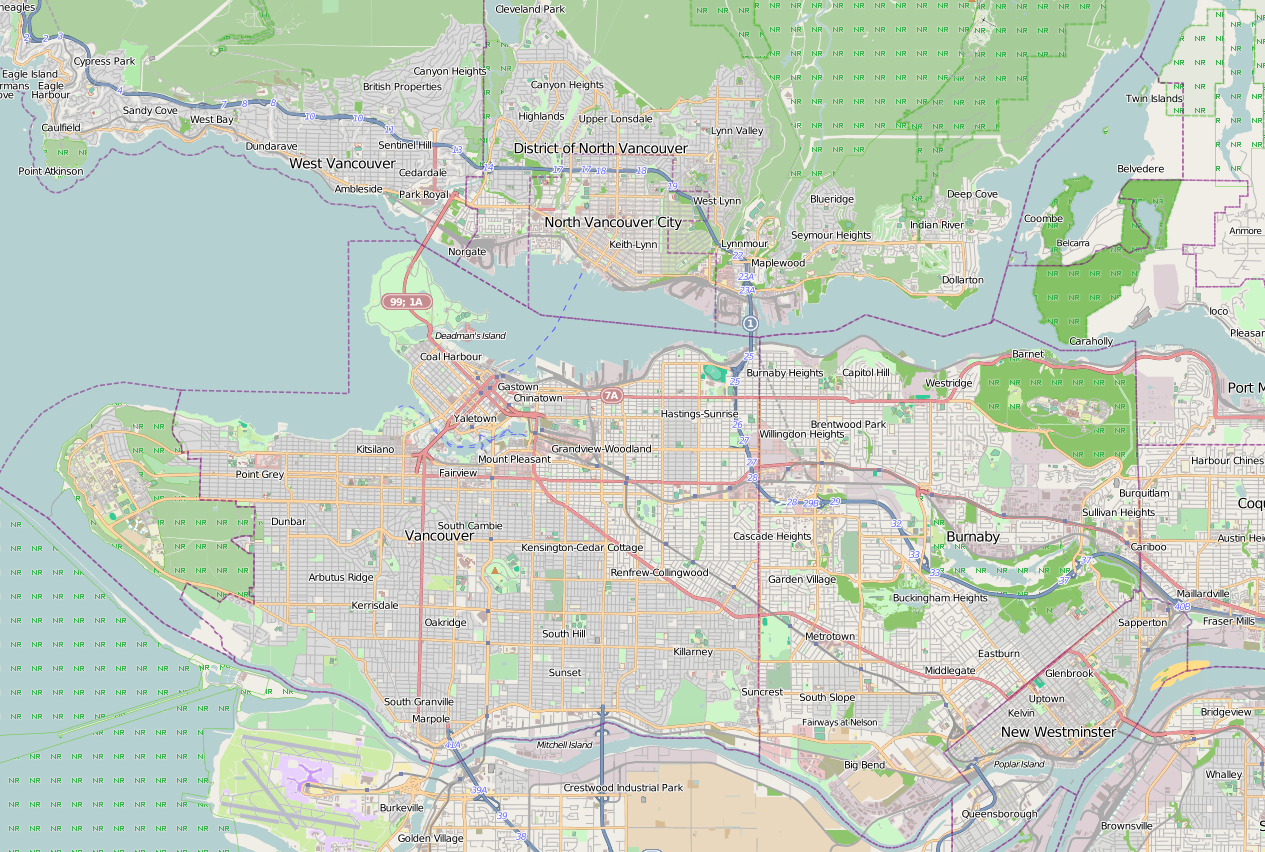
- 2025 Vancouver car attack (Vancouver City)
- Location: 49°13′52″N 123°05′28″W; East 43rd Avenue adjacent to Fraser Street; Vancouver, British Columbia, Canada
- Date: April 26, 2025; 18 months ago 8:14 p.m. PDT (UTC−07:00)
- Attack type: Vehicle-ramming attack
- Weapon: Audi Q7 sports utility vehicle
- Deaths: 11
- Injuries: 32+
- Motive: Under investigation
- Accused: Kai-Ji Adam Lo
- Charges: Second-degree murder (11 counts); Attempted murder (31 counts)

On April 26, 2025, a vehicle-ramming attack took place shortly after the Lapu-Lapu Day festival, a public celebration of Filipino heritage in Vancouver, British Columbia, Canada. The attack left 11 people dead and at least 32 more injured, making it the deadliest attack in Vancouver's history. It stands as the deadliest vehicle-ramming incident in Canadian history, alongside the 2018 Toronto van attack. According to the Vancouver Police Department, the car attack was not an act of terrorism.

== Background ==
Lapu-Lapu Day is a Filipino celebration named for Lapulapu, a Mactan chief who fought against Spanish colonization, and commemorates the victory of the chieftain and his allies against Ferdinand Magellan and his forces at the Battle of Mactan in 1521. British Columbia officially recognized the event in 2023, and an annual festival for Filipino Canadians—who hold a strong presence in Vancouver—has been held in the city since the day was recognized in the province.

According to two Vancouver City Council members, the venue was not cordoned off by city dump trucks as previous city festivals had been. According to VPD interim chief Steve Rai, police had conducted a security assessment of the festival with the City of Vancouver and festival organizers, determining there were no threats to the event or Filipino community, noting the previous year's festival had "zero issues." The Vancouver Sun Run scheduled for the next morning proceeded with increased police presence after the Vancouver Police Department determined there was no ongoing threat to public safety.

The attack occurred two days before the 2025 Canadian federal election. New Democratic Party leader Jagmeet Singh attended the festival, leaving only minutes before the attack.

== Attack ==
The car, a black Audi Q7 SUV, was speeding recklessly in the neighbourhood before turning onto the site of the attack. A minute or two before the attack, the car made a U-turn and was pulled over to the roadside as if to park.

At approximately 8:14 p.m. PDT (UTC−7), the car was driven at high speed through a section of East 43rd Avenue west of Fraser Street. The street had been converted into a food truck zone to serve the Lapu-Lapu Day Block Party held at the adjacent John Oliver Secondary School. Witnesses described bodies sent flying on impact with the car, and videos showed wreckage and victims scattered across a long stretch of road after the attack.

One eyewitness, Kris Pangilinan, said "the vehicle started slowly making its way past the first two or three booths... he started to pick up speed, and... before I knew it, it went right into the crowd."

== Victims ==
Eleven people, ranging in age from 5 to 65, were killed and more than twenty-four others were injured, some critically. Nine of those killed were female and two were male. Vancouver General Hospital received several victims and announced a code orange, a mass casualty incident. On the following day, the Ministry of Health confirmed that 32 people (including the 11 dead) had been hospitalized, and that 17 remained in hospital. As of July 23, 6 remain hospitalized in stable condition. One of the hospitalized victims is a 22-month-old boy while the rest are adults.

Those killed were Maria Victoria Bjarnason (55); Jenifer Darbellay (50); parents Richard Le (47) and Linh Hoang (30), and their daughter Katie Le (5); Nerissa Pagkanlungan (46); Kira Salim (34), a founder of the band Marcha Nerd; Glitza Daniela Samper (30) and her parents, Glitza María Caicedo (60) and Daniel Samper (65); and Jendhel May Sico (27). Three of the victims were Filipino citizens, while the Le family was Vietnamese-Canadian, and the Samper family was Colombian.

== Aftermath ==
The attack occurred in the final days of the Canadian federal election campaign. Following the attack, Mark Carney cancelled election events by the Liberal Party in Calgary and Richmond and went to the site of the attack on April 27 before meeting with relatives of the victims and participating in a church vigil. Conservative leader Pierre Poilievre made an unscheduled visit at a church in Mississauga to meet members of the Filipino community. New Democrat leader Jagmeet Singh cancelled his scheduled appearances on April 27.

The roads surrounding where the attack took place, namely Fraser Street and East 43rd Avenue, remained closed in the days after. A large roadside memorial was set up at the corner of Fraser Street and East 41st by John Oliver Secondary School.

On May 22, the City of Vancouver moved the temporary memorials on the corner of East 41st Avenue and Fraser Street, along East 43rd Avenue near St George Street, and East 44th Avenue and Fraser Street. Items from the memorial have been moved to another temporary memorial at Mountain View Cemetery. In August 2025, the memorial at East 43rd Avenue and Fraser Street was moved to the memorial at Mountain View Cemetery.

=== Government actions ===
The government of British Columbia designated May 2, 2025 as an official day of remembrance and mourning. Public books of condolence were set up at Vancouver City Hall and the British Columbia Parliament Buildings. Vancouver mayor Ken Sim ordered the city to review event-safety practices and called on the provincial government to take further action on mental health and increasing the amount of secure beds for the detainment and mandatory care of the severely mentally ill. Premier David Eby launched an independent commission to examine how to increase safety at public events, in part by looking to other jurisdictions' best practices for risk minimization.

== Accused ==
The driver, Kai-Ji Adam Lo (Chinese: 羅凱基), a 30-year-old individual residing in Vancouver, was apprehended by bystanders after attempting to flee, and taken into custody by police. He is believed to have acted alone and was the sole occupant of the car. The Vancouver Police confirmed that Lo has a significant history of interactions with police and healthcare professionals "related to mental health", but no prior criminal record. Lo was diagnosed with schizophrenia some time before the attack. The police rejected terrorism as a motive.

On January 28, 2024, Lo's 31-year-old older brother, Alexander, had been found dead in a Kensington-Cedar Cottage area home in East Vancouver. Dwight Kematch was charged with second-degree murder in connection to the killing, pleading not guilty in October 2024. In January 2026, Kematch was sentenced to life imprisonment with no possibility of parole for 11 years. Kai-Ji Lo attended the sentencing virtually from a forensic hospital.

Lo's mother attempted suicide a few months after Alexander's death, and remained in hospital for a month.

In the weeks before the attack, Lo requested to have his antipsychotic medication reduced, even as his mental health was deteriorating. Three months prior to the attack, Lo spent 1,000 dollars on a device to identify chemical warfare agents. In a day before the attack, he called the Richmond RCMP to say someone spilled chemicals in his SUV and that a virus had been installed in his dashcam. Hours before the attack, a family member had contacted a psychiatric ward about Lo's deteriorating mental health. He appeared to suffer from delusions and paranoia. It is currently unknown whether any action was taken. Vancouver Coastal Health confirmed that at the time of the attack, Lo was under the care of a mental health team and on extended leave from hospital in accordance with the Mental Health Act. They also said there was no indication Lo was a public safety risk.

On May 2, 2025, a judge ordered Lo to undergo a mental health assessment. Lo attended a two-day hearing on his mental fitness to stand trial in July. A judge imposed a publication ban on the hearing.

On September 10, 2025, Lo was considered mentally fit to stand trial.

== Criminal proceedings ==
Lo was charged with eleven counts of second-degree murder under section 235 of the Criminal Code and made a court appearance for a bail hearing on April 27. Lo will remain in police custody after not requesting bail during the appearance. Vancouver Police charged Lo with three more counts of second-degree murder on July 22. On May 30, Lo appeared by video in the Vancouver Provincial Court. His next appearance was on June 6 and a fitness for trial hearing proceeded in September. After being considered mentally fit to stand trial, Lo was charged with an additional 31 counts of attempted murder. Lo was due back in court on October 30, where a fix date hearing was scheduled for January 15, 2026, where an arraignment date will be set. A survivor of the attack filed a class-action civil lawsuit for damages on October 23.

== Responses ==
Numerous local and national political figures offered their condolences, including Prime Minister Mark Carney, federal Conservative Party leader Pierre Poilievre, federal New Democratic Party leader Jagmeet Singh (who had attended the festival earlier in the day), Governor General Mary Simon, British Columbia premier David Eby, Vancouver mayor Ken Sim, federal Green Party co-leader Elizabeth May, and King Charles III. Vancouver Police Department interim chief Steve Rai described the attack as "the darkest day in our city's history".

The Philippine Consulate General in Vancouver expressed sympathy. In the Philippines, President Bongbong Marcos, Vice President Sara Duterte, and several senators expressed sadness and outrage over the attack as well as sympathy for the victims. Professional tennis player Leylah Fernandez offered condolences to the victims saying she was "absolutely devastated to hear about the death of my fellow Canadian-Filipinos". Vancouver Whitecaps FC held a moment of silence for the victims of the attack and held a Philippine flag prior to their game against Minnesota United FC on April 27.

The prime minister of Spain, Pedro Sánchez, reported being "deeply dismayed" through his personal X account. The Ministry of Foreign Affairs of Peru issued a statement expressing "deep sorrow and solidarity with the Canadian government and people."
