= Stop Podcasting Yourself =

Canadian comedy podcast

- Genre: Comedy
- Language: English

Cast and voices
- Hosted by: Graham Clark; Dave Shumka

Production
- Length: 90 minutes

Publication
- No. of episodes: 974 (as of 17 November 2026) plus 109 bonus episodes
- Original release: March 3, 2008
- Provider: Maximum Fun
- Updates: Weekly

Reception
- Cited for: 3 Canadian Comedy Awards

Related
- Website: www.maximumfun.org/shows/stop-podcasting-yourself

Stop Podcasting Yourself is a Canadian comedy podcast distributed on the Maximum Fun network hosted by Graham Clark and Dave Shumka. Each week the comedy duo invites a guest (usually a fellow comedian) onto the program for a conversational interview. It is sometimes referred to by its acronym, SPY. The podcast is a three-time Canadian Comedy Award Winner for Best Podcast/Best Audio Show or Series, winning the award in 2012, 2013 and 2014.

== History ==
Stop Podcasting Yourself started independently on March 2, 2008, being distributed through iTunes and its blog. At the time, podcasting had not "sorted itself out yet". Originally, Clark and Shumka intended to do sketches on the show. Due to its early start in the world of podcasting, the show is considered a pioneer for comedy podcast chat shows.

On March 22, 2010, it was announced that the Vancouver-based podcast would join Maximum Fun.

On April 15, 2016, the hosts went on to sprout the podcast and album Our Debut Album.

== Format ==
The podcast's segments include "Get to Know Us" (where they get to know the guest) and "Overheard", where they discuss humorous things they've overheard (or sometimes overseen) in their day-to-day lives. The podcast is released every Monday and is the only Canadian show on the Maximum Fun network. Other than those two segments, the show has "little in the way of format". Despite this, the show has been described as having a consistent "tone, and speed ... whether the guest is a famous LA comedian, or a smaller local one". The show is also consistent in releasing episodes. As of 2016, the show had only missed two weeks since debuting.

The show is usually recorded at Shumka's home studio in Vancouver. Its listeners are referred to as "bumpers" after Shumka mistakenly referred to the audience that way in episode 1.
