= Dave Lawrence =

Canadian actor/producer (born 1976)

- Born: April 20, 1976 (age 50); Calgary, Alberta, Canada
- Occupations: Actor; writer; producer; director
- Years active: 2002–present
- Website: giverterry.com

David (Dave) Lawrence is a Canadian actor, improviser, and producer. He most recently played Terry on the Trailer Park Boys: Jail series, during its first season. He is best known for his role as the writer, creator and star of the FUBAR franchise.

== Background ==
Dave Lawrence was born and raised in Calgary, Alberta and attended Saint Mary's High School. He joined the Loose Moose Theatre Company when he was 15 years old and is currently a senior ensemble performer and instructor with the theatre. He studied at Mount Royal College (now Mount Royal University) and travelled to Japan and Australia to perform as a busker and puppeteer.

== Career ==
In 2000, Lawrence, with Michael Dowse and Paul Spence, created the mockumentary film FUBAR, which was produced on Lawrence's credit card with a $10,000 shooting budget and the film was an official entry into the 2002 Sundance Film Festival.

Lawrence's character, Terry Cahill, was created and conceptualized before the film, in the mid-nineties at the Loose Moose Theatre. Lawrence approached Michael Dowse on the set of his first film Static with an idea to create an improvised Mockumentary film based on the character.

Along with a team, Lawrence wrote, produced and created the FUBAR film, playing Terry, a central character of the FUBAR franchise. Lawrence continues to play in the role of Terry today. The film was shot in and around Calgary, Alberta, and the entirety of the film dialogue was improvised, with only the outline of the scene predetermined.

In 2004, Lawrence won a Bessie Craft Award for his work with the Nova Scotia government in an anti-smoking campaign.

In 2007, Lawrence starred opposite Leslie Nielsen in the Discovery Channel series Doctor*Ology.

In 2010 the sequel to FUBAR, FUBAR 2: Balls to the Wall, made its world premiere by opening the Midnight Madness program at the Toronto International Film Festival and premiered at the South by Southwest. This film was a runner-up for the People's Choice Award.

In 2011 Lawrence was named one of Calgary's Top 40 under 40 by Avenue Magazine in 2011.

Lawrence is the co-creator of the television series FUBAR: Age of Computer which aired on City TV and Viceland in 2017. Lawrence recently played Terry on the Trailer Park Boys: Jail which is aired through the streaming site Swearnet.

== Filmography ==
Film performances
Year	Title	Role
2000	Waydowntown	Smoker
2002	The Investigation	Teenage Victim
2003	A Problem with Fear	Backpack Guy
2002	FUBAR	Terry Cahill
2004	It's All Gone Pete Tong	Horst
2008	Freezer Burn: The Invasion of Laxdale	Randy
2008	Who is KK Downey?	Cavan
2010	FUBAR 2	Terry Cahill
2011	Goon	Richard
2011	Western Confidential	William
2011	Lloyd the Conqueror	Jorgen

Television performances
Year	Title	Role
2006	Northern Town	Bernie
2007	Doctor*Ology	Robert
2017	Fubar Age of Computer	Terry Cahill
2021	Trailer Park Boys: Jail	Terry Cahill
