= Service record =

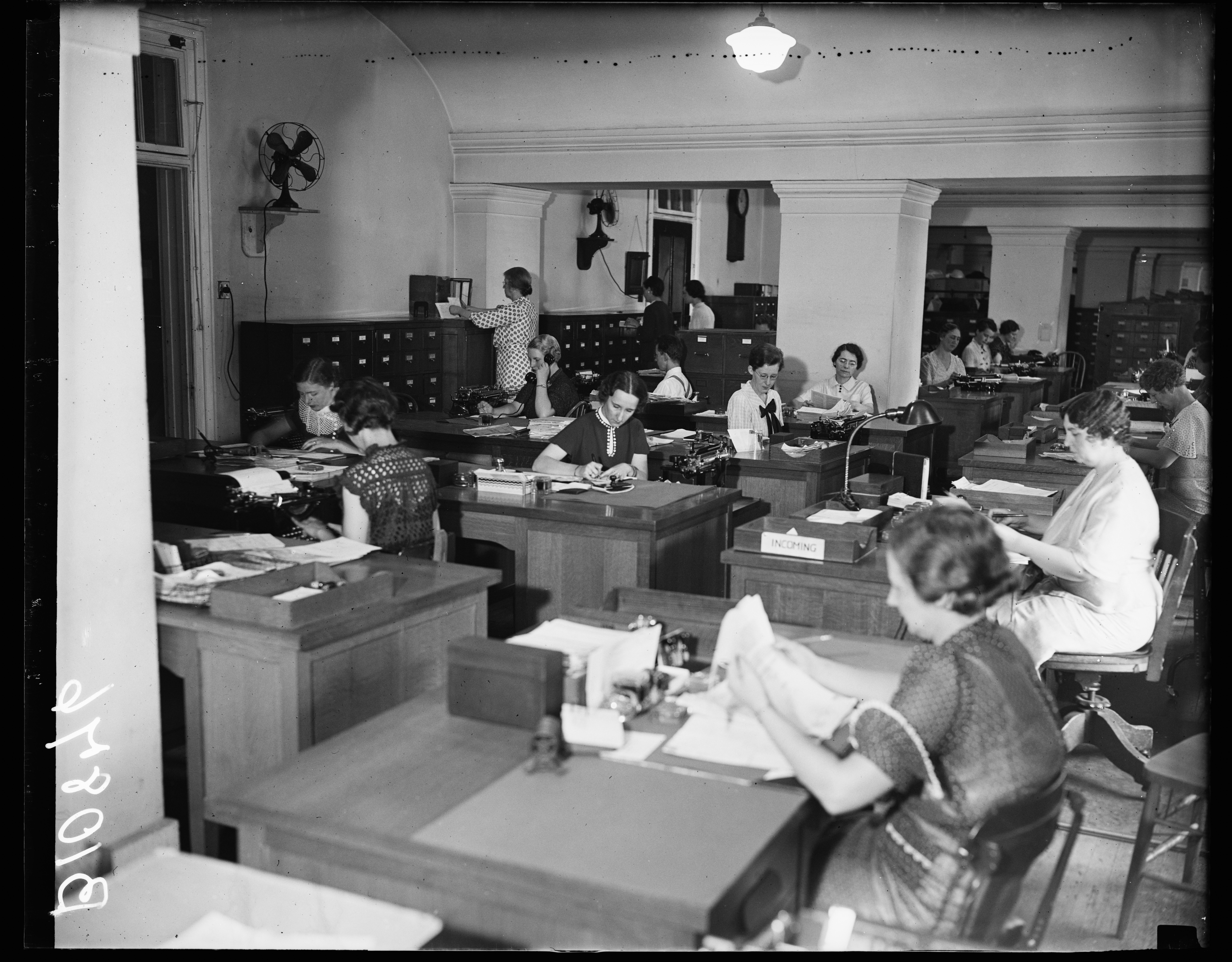
Workers maintaining service records at the United States Civil Service Commission in 1933

A service record is a collection of either electronic or printed material which provides a documentary history of a person's activities and accomplishments while serving as a member of a given organization. Service records are most often associated with the military, but are commonly found in other groups, such as large corporations or for use by employees of a civilian government.

== Australian armed forces ==
Service records for the Australian Army, are available at the National Archives of Australia website. The service records of the Royal Australian Navy and Royal Australian Air Force are also available.

World War I service records provide the dates when the person was "in the field", that is with his unit on active service, if and when they embarked for oversea service, and the names of the units in which the person served. The service record also documents other changes—promotions, transfers, time at base, the date and place of sickness or wounding, and the names of hospital or clearing station where the person was treated.

== Canada ==
Canadian military service records are held by either the Department of National Defence or Library and Archives Canada depending on the age of the file. The Library and Archives Canada is responsible for with acquiring, preserving, and providing accessibility for military service files.

Library and Archives Canada holds publicly open military service records are available for personnel serving before 1914, personnel in the First World War, personnel who died in service in the Second World War, and records relating to medals, honours and awards. Library and Archives Canada holds restricted records for regular service members between 1919–1997, reserve members between 1919–2007, and Newfoundland Militia serving in the Second World War.

== Pakistan ==
Pakistan Military maintains the service records in the official "Digest of Service".

== Nazi Germany ==
The records of Nazi Germany are extensive and the record keeping ability of the Nazi Party was generally considered to be extremely meticulous. Service records of Nazi organizations are maintained at the Berlin Document Center, in Berlin, Germany, with several microfiche copies of these records available at the National Archives and Records Administration in College Park, Maryland.

Records of the Wehrmacht, that is the regular armed forces of Germany during World War II, are maintained at the Bundesarchiv, also in Berlin.

== United States ==
Service records of the United States armed forces are considered vital documents both for historical reasons and also to help secure veteran benefits for discharged or retired service members. In addition, service records of the U.S. military provide a chronology of a service member's career and thus ensure accurate tracking of accomplishments, activities, and promotions.

Military service records of active duty personnel are maintained by the various branches of the U.S. armed forces. Service records of retired and discharged personnel are maintained at the Military Personnel Records Center in St. Louis, Missouri; after 2005, most U.S. military service records are retained by the military branch since most such records are electronically stored.

Typical makeup of a United States military paper service record

- DD Form 214
- Master personnel folder (201 File, Service Record Book, AF Form 7, etc.)
- Officer Qualification Record (OQR) (if commissioned)
- Evaluations and fitness reports
- Awards and citations
- Disciplinary data and court martial records
- Dependent and emergency contact records
- Clothing allowance and leave records
- Letters and various correspondence
- Security clearance information
- Reserve points and reserve service history (if applicable)
- Discharge Data
