= Paul Spence =

Canadian actor

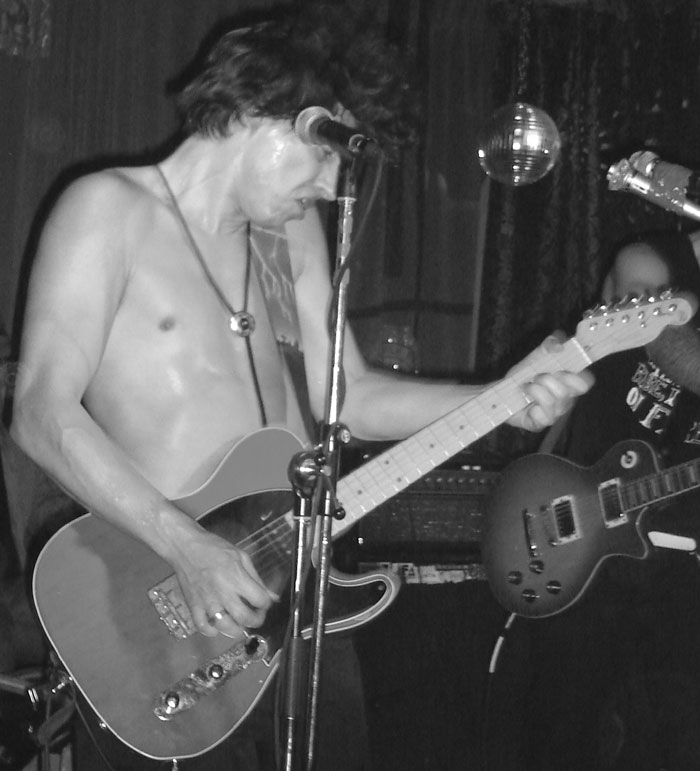
- Paul Spence playing live with CPC Gangbangs in 2005.
- Born: January 29, 1976 (age 50); Calgary, Alberta, Canada
- Occupations: Actor, musician

Paul Spence is a Canadian actor, author and musician. He is best known for his portrayal of headbanger Dean Murdoch in the 2002 mockumentary film FUBAR: The Movie, which he co-wrote with friends Dave Lawrence and Michael Dowse. He also reprised the character in the sequel film FUBAR 2, and the television series Fubar Age of Computer.

In 2005, he appeared in the film It's All Gone Pete Tong, and in 2007, he had a supporting role in I'm Not There.

As a musician he has played in bands such as The Infernos, Lyle Sheraton and the Daylight Lovers, and CPC Gangbangs. He also later launched Night Seeker, a parody heavy metal band in which he played in character as Dean Murdoch. In 2018, Night Seeker released the album 3069: A Space-Rock Sex Odyssey. Around the same time, Harry Shearer was releasing the album Smalls Change in character as Derek Smalls from This Is Spinal Tap, and Spence interviewed Shearer as Smalls for Vice.

Spence received a Vancouver Film Critics Circle nomination for Best Actor in a Canadian Film at the Vancouver Film Critics Circle Awards 2010 for FUBAR 2, and a Genie Award nomination for Best Original Song at the 31st Genie Awards in 2011 for the film's song "There's No Place Like Christmas".

== Filmography ==
=== Film ===
Year	Title	Role	Notes
2002	FUBAR	Dean Murdoch	Also writer, producer, and composer
2005	It's All Gone Pete Tong	Alfonse	
2005	The Recommendations	Janos	
2005	These Girls	Lenny	
2007	Beth	Paul	
2007	I'm Not There	Homer	
2008	Freezer Burn: The Invasion of Laxdale	Dwayne	
2008	Sunday Afternoon	Claude	
2008	Who Is KK Downey?	Brett	
2009	The Trotsky	History teacher	
2010	FUBAR 2	Dean Murdoch	Also producer and writer
2010	Peepers	Peter	
2011	Western Confidential	Luther	Also writer
2013	Goin Ape	Cow Punk	
2015	The Saver	David	
2017	Sir John A. and the Curse of the Anti-Quenched	Depressed Strip Club DJ	
2024	Deaner '89	Dean Murdoch	Also writer, producer, and composer

=== Television ===
Year	Title	Role	Notes
2001	Anatomy of a Hate Crime	Man on Bike	
2009	The Foundation	Apollo	Five episodes
2017	Fubar Age of Computer	Dean Murdoch	Series lead; eight episodes
2017	There Is Something in Slough Lake	Howard	Television film
