= Marine Corps Total Force System =

Pay and personnel management system employed by the U.S. Marine Corps

Marine Corps Total Force System (MCTFS) is the integrated pay and personnel system for active duty and reserve Marines, and the authoritative source of data for all Marine Corps (MC) pay and personnel information consisting of over 550,000 records. MCTFS has been successfully fielded and is currently in the post-deployment system support phase of its lifecycle. MCTFS supports centralized business-critical pay functions for the Marine Corps Enterprise on time and accurately, including computation and payment of net pay to individual Marines, while accommodating all necessary system change requests to meet current legislative, regulatory, mission essential, force reset, and contingency change requirements. MCTFS is maintained in an audit compliant state to ensure accurate financial transactions and reporting. MCTFS includes a comprehensive history of pay entitlements, deductions, and payments for each active duty and reserve Marine. The principal advocate within the Marine Corps is the Deputy Commandant, Manpower and Reserve Affairs.

== Mission ==
The mission of the MCTFS is to provide integrated personnel and pay functionality for all active and reserve Marines within a single system and personnel management for retirees, by using a single, logical database which incorporates the records of all active, reserve and retired Marines. Additionally, the MCTFS will provide limited functionality for training and security management matters that pertain to personnel and pay management.

== Purpose ==
The system provides for recording, processing, and maintaining of military personnel and pay data on a continuing basis within the Marine Corps. It provides information for pay, personnel administration, and manpower management. It uses an integrated, single logical data base to process transactions, at one central location at the Defense Enterprise Computing Center (DECC) in Mechanicsburg. This supports all operating forces and supporting establishment organizations, which total over 800 reporting units (RU's). Use of this information facilitates:

- Planning and execution of manpower personnel functions, including:
  - Personnel Management/Accountability/Security
  - Military pay
  - Training
  - Distribution
  - Assignment/Mobilization
  - Promotion
  - Classification
  - Separation
  - Preparation of budgets
  - Development of improved manpower management techniques
  - Recruiting
- Recording historical data of the United States Marine Corps

== Reporting purposes ==
The data collection of the MCTFS is based on the principle of singular reporting. Whenever practical, an event is reported when and where it occurs to ensure accuracy and timeliness of reporting. An item of information is entered into the system only once; thereafter, only changes, deletions, or corrections to this information are reported. MCTFS uses a centralized strategy and management style with decentralized execution at the lowest reporting level. The information maintained within the MCTFS is used for the functions described above. Additionally, the purposes for which information is maintained within the MCTFS are adequately described per the requirements of the Privacy Act of 1974 and manpower Life Cycle Management (LCM) documentation maintained by the Deputy Commandant Manpower and Reserve Affairs (Code MI) and Deputy Commandant Programs & Resources (Code RFF). Data maintained in MCTFS on Marines is categorized as the Official Electronic Military File (OEMF) for that individual. As such, the OEMF is subordinate in precedence to the Official Military Personnel File (OMPF) maintained by the Commandant of the Marine Corps (Code MMSB). The data contained in the OEMF must be carefully safeguarded under the provisions of the Privacy Act of 1974. Commanders who fail to do so may be held personally accountable.

== Reporting feedback ==
Prompt and complete feedback is essential in the MCTFS. Reporting Units (RU) are provided access to several files holding cyclic data retrievable by the unit as desired. This feedback results in the reentry of corrected data if required. Usage of the information contained in the data files depicted in the MCTFS Input/Output Model Figure 1-1 of the MCTFS PRIUM is encouraged by all levels of command and management. Feedback to these levels of command and management via reports and to the RU's via online files is critical to the quality control of information within the MCTFS.

== MCTFS database ==
The MCTFS central database is maintained by TSO - Indianapolis, IN (though it is physically resident at the Defense Enterprise Computing Center (DECC), Mechanicsburg) and contains all data elements resident in the MCTFS. Information concerning the overall security parameters of the MCTFS is contained in the MCTFS Decision Paper IV as well as within other chapters of the MCTFSPRIUM. Records containing specified data elements for all military personnel (Active and Reserve components, to include retirees) comprise the Central Master File (CMF). The central database contains all data elements resident in the MCTFS.

== See also ==
- Unit Deployment Program
- Officer Qualification Record (OQR)
- DIMHRS
