= Kenny Powers (stuntman) =

American stuntman (1947–2009)

- Born: Kenneth Marion Powers; July 9, 1947; Landrum, South Carolina
- Died: February 28, 2009 (aged 61); Hampton, Virginia
- Occupation: Stuntman

Kenneth Marion Powers (July 9, 1947 – February 28, 2009) was an American stuntman. Powers was born to Edward Lee and Florence Pauline Powers in Landrum, South Carolina, on July 9, 1947. He grew up in Landrum, and after high school, he joined the U.S. Navy and served as a barber according to his DD 214. He died at the Hampton Veterans Center in Hampton, Virginia on February 28, 2009. He was married to Beverly Powers at the time of his death.

== St. Lawrence River jump ==
He is best known today for his unsuccessful October 1979 attempt to jump the Saint Lawrence River in a rocket-powered Lincoln Continental, where he took the place of stuntman Ken Carter. He suffered significant injuries including a broken back, but survived.

Carter's years of planning for the "Superjump", and Powers's failed attempt were the subject of a 1981 documentary called The Devil at Your Heels, directed by Robert Fortier and produced by the National Film Board of Canada. According to some sources, Powers was substituted at the last minute for Carter, without Carter's knowledge, because the jump's backers feared Carter had decided the jump would not work. However, Kenny Powers and Donna Ray Powers have stated that Carter still wanted to do the jump, but the backers were concerned about Carter's health. This is the account in the official documentary of the jump. Ken Carter and Kenny Powers remained friends until his death.

Video of the stunt also appeared on the American television show That's Incredible!, as well as the 1981 film Faces of Death II. A four-minute clip of the stunt taken from Faces of Death II was uploaded to YouTube in 2006, causing renewed popularity.

The stunt has been featured in the Heavyweight Podcast by Jonathan Goldstein titled "Kenny" and the Dollop Podcast. In addition, the stunt has inspired a musical film titled Aim for the Roses, scored by Mark Haney.

== Other work ==
Powers worked for and with Carter for many years, and also claimed to have performed stunts for Hollywood, including in the 1970s films Smokey and the Bandit, Vanishing Point, and Hooper. However, he is not listed in any movie credits. Kenny did stunt work for the Ken Carter team during the time that Smokey and the Bandit was filmed as the team prepared for the 1979 Super Jump. According to Butch Carter, Ken Carter's brother who also did stunt work for the team, the team was considered for the stunt work in Smokey and the Bandit, but another team was selected. According to Butch Carter and other team members, Kenny worked for the Ken Carter team the whole time of the filming of Smokey and the Bandit.

He continued to perform stunts until at least 2005. Kenny did two stunts in August 2004. One was in Dothan, Alabama and the other stunt was done in Greenville, Alabama. Kenny did his next to last stunt in Timmonsville, South Carolina on August 19, 2006. His last stunt was in Greenville, Alabama on August 26, 2006.
