= Specialist (rank) =

Military rank

Specialist is a military rank in some countries' armed forces. Two branches of the United States Armed Forces use the rank. It is one of the four junior enlisted ranks in the United States Army, above private (PVT), private (PV2), and private first class and is equivalent in pay grade to corporal; in the United States Space Force, four grades of specialist comprise the four junior enlisted ranks below the rank of sergeant.

== Denmark ==
=== Regular forces ===
In the Royal Danish Navy and Royal Danish Air Force, the rank of specialist is branch-specific; "Naval specialist" and "Air force specialist" (Danish: Marinespecialist, Flyverspecialist) respectively. The ranks are placed below corporal and above private first class (Overkonstabel). They are rated OR-3 within NATO and the rank has the grade of M112 within the Ministry of Defence's pay structure.

NATO code	OR-3
Royal Danish Navy
Royal Danish Navy	Marinespecialist
Royal Danish Air Force
Royal Danish Air Force	Flyverspecialist
Danish pay grade	M112

=== Home guard ===
In 2018, new specialist ranks were introduced to the Danish Home Guard. These new ranks were created to remove the need for leadership training at the lower ranks, as the selected functions no longer require actual leadership.

Rank group	Home guard specialists
Army
Navy
Air Force
Danish	Hjemmeværnsspecialist 1	Hjemmeværnsspecialist 2
English	Home guard specialist 1st class	Home guard specialist 2nd class

== United States ==
=== United States Army ===
==== Trades and specialties (1902–1920) ====
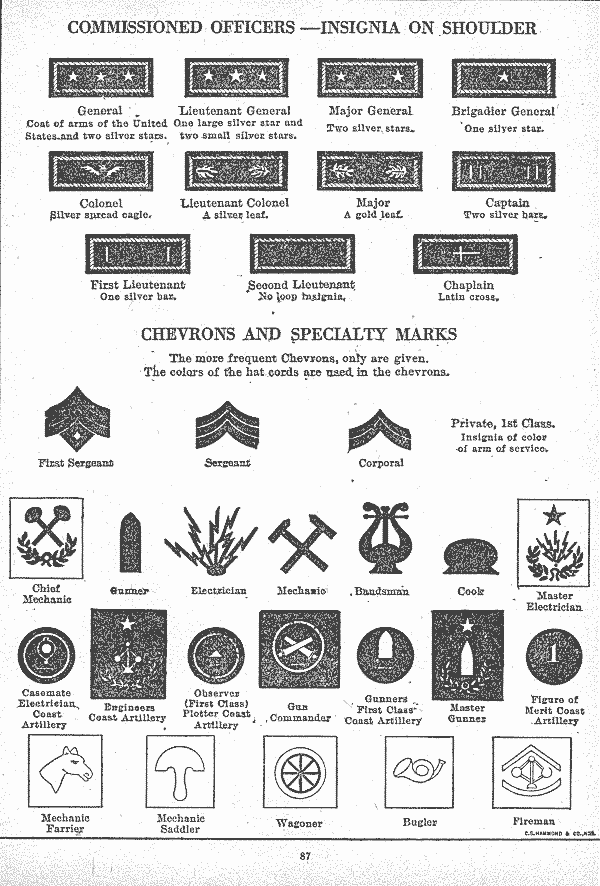

In 1920, the Army rank and pay system received a major overhaul and consolidation. All enlisted and non-commissioned ranks were reduced from 128 different insignias and several pay grades to only Seven Rank Insignias and seven pay grades, which were numbered in seniority from seventh grade (lowest) to first grade (highest). The wearing of specialist badges inset in rank insignia was abolished, and a generic system of chevrons and arcs replaced them.

==== Private/specialist (1920–1942) ====
From 1920 to 1942, there was a rating (not a rank) for men of the sixth and seventh grades designated "private first class, specialist", or "private, specialist," that was graded in six classes (the lowest being sixth class and the highest being first class). They were considered the equal of a private first class or private in authority, but drew additional pay in relationship to the specialist level possessed on top of their base pay. The classes only indicated competency, not authority, and a specialist did not outrank another man of his respective non-specialist rank.

Officially, specialists wore the single chevron of a private first class because no special insignia was authorized to indicate their rank. Unofficially, a specialist could be authorized, at his commander's discretion, to wear one to six additional rockers (one rocker for sixth class, and a maximum of six rockers for first class) under their rank chevron to denote specialty level. Such insignia was commercially available through catalogs or the base Post Exchange (PX) and could also be ordered with inset trade badges.

==== Technician (1942–1948) ====
1st grade		2nd grade	3rd grade		4th grade		5th grade		6th grade	7th grade
										No Insignia
Master sergeant	First sergeant	Technical sergeant	Staff sergeant	Technician Third Grade	Sergeant	Technician Fourth Grade	Corporal	Technician Fifth Grade	Private first class	Private
M/Sgt.	1st Sgt.	T/Sgt.	S/Sgt.	T/3.	Sgt.	T/4.	Cpl.	T/5.	Pfc.	Pvt.

On 8 January 1942, the rank of technician was introduced to replace the private/specialist rank, which was discontinued by 30 June 1942. Initially, this gave technical specialists more authority by grading them as non-commissioned officers. However, confusion and lowered morale among senior NCOs led to the Army reversing this stance in late 1943, after which technicians no longer held non-commissioned officer status. Beginning 4 September 1942, technicians wore a block "T" insignia under their chevrons for easier identification.

Technicians were considered superior in rank to all NCOs and Enlisted of a lower pay grade, but inferior in rank to an NCO of equal or senior pay grade. For example, Technicians Third Grade (Grade 3) outranked Sergeants/Technicians Fourth Grade (Grade 4) and below, but were outranked themselves by Staff Sergeants (Grade 3) and above.

Technicians were addressed the same as the corresponding non-commissioned officer at the same pay grade: a technician fifth grade was addressed as corporal, a technician fourth grade as sergeant, and a technician third grade as staff sergeant. The technician ranks were discontinued in 1948.

==== Specialist (1955–present) ====
E9	E8	E7	E6	E5	E4
Specialist 9 rank insignia (U.S. Army)	Specialist 8 rank insignia (U.S. Army)	Master Specialist / Specialist 7 rank insignia (U.S. Army)	Specialist 1st Class / Specialist 6 rank insignia (U.S. Army)	Specialist 2nd Class / Specialist 5 rank insignia (U.S. Army)	Specialist 3rd Class / Specialist 4 / Specialist rank insignia (U.S. Army)
Spec/9 (1959–1968)	Spec/8 (1959–1968)	MSP (1955–1959); Spec/7 (1959–1978)	SP1 (1955–1959); Spec/6 (1959–1985)	SP2 (1955–1959); Spec/5 (1959–1985)	SP3 (1955–1959); Spec/4 (1959–1985); SPC (1985–present)

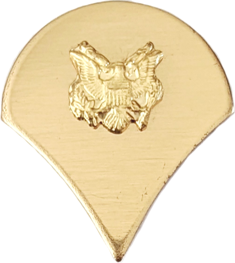
Example: Spec/4 or SPC brass collar rank insignia (worn from 1975–present)

Specialist
- US Army Specialist (E-4)
- Country: United States
- Service branch: United States Army
- Abbreviation: SPC
- Rank group: Enlisted
- NATO rank code: OR-4 (Army SPC)
- Pay grade: E-4 (Army SPC)
- Next higher rank: Corporal (Army) or Sergeant (Army)
- Next lower rank: Private first class (Army)
- Equivalent ranks: Petty officer third class (Navy/Coast Guard); Senior airman (Air Force); Specialist 4 (Space Force); Corporal (USMC)

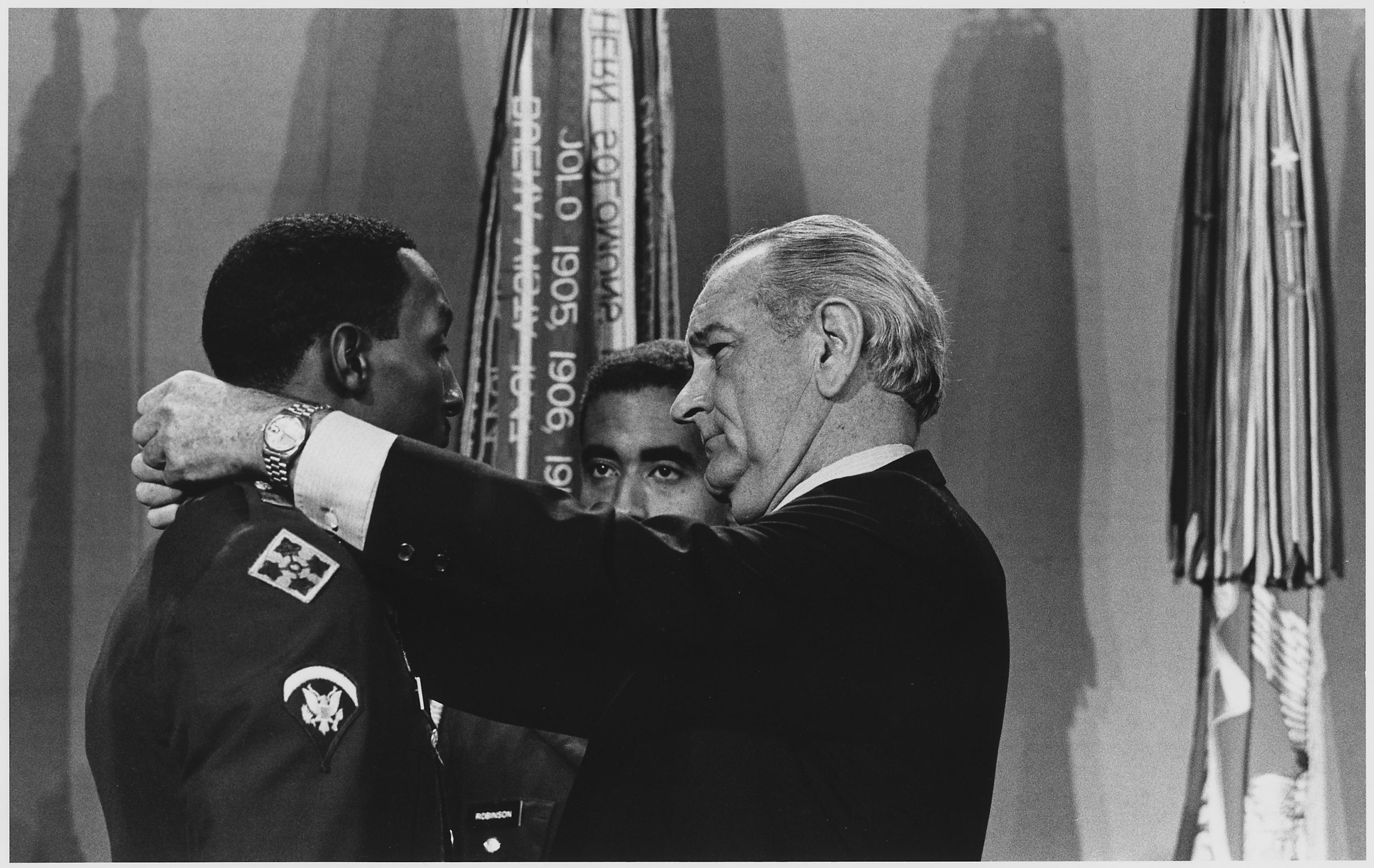
Specialist 5 Dwight H. Johnson receiving the Medal of Honor from President Johnson

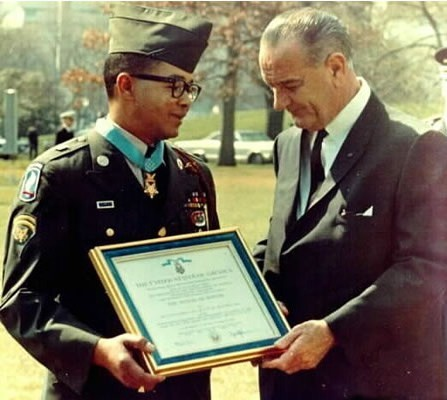
President Johnson presenting a then-Specialist 6 Lawrence Joel with Medal of Honor and Certificate

On 1 July 1955, four grades of specialist were established: Specialist third class (E-4 or SP3), specialist second class (E-5 or SP2), specialist first class (E-6 or SP1), and master specialist (E-7 or MSP). The insignia was yellow on a dark blue background, with the General Service Army Eagle set in the center. It was the same smaller 2-inch wide size as women's NCO stripes. To differentiate specialists from NCOs, the stripes were the same shape as NCO stripes—but were inverted to distinguish them. The senior specialist ranks of SP2 (E5), SP1 (E6), and MSP (E7) were indicated by one, two, or three yellow arcs over the eagle respectively.

In 1956 the Army Green uniform was adopted. The specialist insignia was redesigned in 1958 to be larger, broader, and more rounded. The enlisted stripes were changed in 1961 from yellow on a blue backing to Goldenlite Yellow on a green backing.

In 1958 the DoD added two pay grades to give enlisted soldiers more opportunities to progress through a full career with additional opportunities for promotion. Thus the recognition was changed to six specialist ranks, and the pay grade was tied into the rank designation: specialist four (E-4), specialist five (E-5), specialist six (E-6), specialist seven (E-7), specialist eight (E-8), and specialist nine (E-9). The "Super Grades" of Spec./8 and Spec./9 were respectively given one and two Goldenlite chevrons below the eagle.

CSM Daniel K. Elder goes on to explain, "In 1968 when the Army added the rank of command sergeant major, the specialist ranks at E-8 and E-9 were abolished", because they were notional rather than actual. "In 1978 the specialist rank at E-7 was discontinued and in 1985, the specialist ranks at E-5 and E-6 were discontinued."

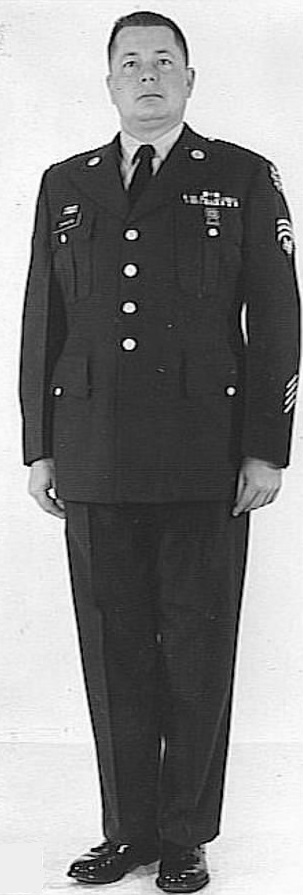
Photo of a U.S. Army Specialist 7

These specialist ranks were created to reward personnel with higher degrees of experience and technical knowledge. Appointment to either specialist or non-commissioned officer status was determined by military occupational specialty (MOS). Different military occupational specialties had various transition points. For example, in the band career field (excluding special bands at D.C. and West Point), a bandsman could not achieve non-commissioned officer status until pay grade E-6 was attained. In some military occupational specialties, a soldier was appointed either a specialist or non-commissioned officer depending on which particular position or "slot" that he filled in his organization. A cook was a specialist, while a mess steward held the rank of sergeant (E-5 through E-7).

Specialist grades paralleled the corresponding grades of non-commissioned officer (E-4 through E-7) only in terms of pay. The specialist grades, although they outranked the enlisted grades (E-1 to E-3), were outranked by all non-commissioned officers (E-4 to E-9) and lacked the authority conferred on an NCO. This was the major differentiation between a specialist and a "hard striper".

The Medal of Honor was awarded to SP4 Michael J. Fitzmaurice by President Richard Nixon at the White House, 15 October 1973.

Only the lowest specialist grade remains, with the rank of specialist 4 known simply as "specialist". While the official abbreviation was changed from "SP4" to "SPC" upon the elimination of the SP5 and SP6 ranks, the SIDPERS database was authorized to continue using SP4 until the change could be made at little or no additional expense in conjunction with other system upgrades. The continued use of SP4 on automatically produced documents (transfer orders, leave and earnings statements, unit manning reports, inter alia) hampered the adoption of the new abbreviation (and, to a lesser extent, the absence of "-4" in the non-abbreviated rank) by individual soldiers who viewed the computer-produced documents as the final word on the proper term.

The rank of specialist (E-4) is the typical rank to which privates first class are promoted after two years of service, although PFCs may be waived into the rank of specialist after 18 months' time in service and 6 months' time in grade. It is granted far more often than corporal (also E-4). Those specialists who are graduates of the Basic Leader Course (BLC) and who have been recommended for promotion become corporals before further promotion. This change in Army culture applied to the Active Army and the National Guard as of 1 July 2021, and to the Army Reserve; the Army Reserve change was scheduled to take place on 1 October 2021. The rank of corporal is reserved for personnel who have passed the BLC.

Specialists were informally called "specs" (pronunciation IPA: /ˈspɛk/ ) plus the numerical grade of their rank. Thus, a specialist 4 was called "spec 4". As of July 2016 the rank of Specialist is the most common rank in the U.S. Army, being held by 115,033 of the Army's 473,844 soldiers.

==== Recruits with college degrees and Officer Candidates ====
New recruits enlisting into the United States Army who have earned a four-year degree, and as of 2006 those with civilian-acquired job skills, will enter as a specialist (pay grade E-4). Typically, newly recruited officer candidates hold the rank of specialist when enlisted and during BCT (basic combat training) prior to their official enrollment into OCS (Officer Candidate School) where they will be administratively promoted to the pay grade of E-5 but are referred to as "officer candidate" (OC) as opposed to sergeant (SGT).

=== United States Navy (1941–1974) ===
==== Specialists (1941–1948) ====
Between 1941 and 1948, the United States Navy maintained an enlisted rate of Specialist in the petty officer pay grade structure. This was to absorb directly appointed civilian experts needed in the rapidly expanding Navy. A seaman would typically be known as a specialist followed by a letter indicating what field the specialty was held. For instance, a Specialist (C) served as a "classification interviewer", while a Specialist (T) was a "navy teacher", among several other specialist designations.

The concept was proposed in late 1941 and was approved by the Secretary of the Navy sometime in November or December of that year. The Navy started with four specialties in February 1942, expanding to twenty-two specialties and their associated sub-specialties by the war's end in 1945. The Coast Guard added an additional five exclusive specialties in 1943 (D, CW, PR, PS and TR); four were awarded double letters to avoid duplication. The WAVES added Specialist (U) for "Utility"—a general purpose title that was abolished in 1944 and merged with the similar Specialist (X), for "Specialist (Not Elsewhere Classified)".

The trade badge was an embroidered diamond-shaped border inset with the specialty letter and set between the US Navy Eagle and the rank chevrons. Specialists 3rd, 2nd, and 1st Class (Grades 4, 3, and 2; equivalent to Petty Officers 3rd, 2nd and 1st Class) had 1 to 3 downward red chevrons. A Chief Specialist (Grade 1; equivalent to a Chief Petty Officer) had the US Navy Eagle perched on a red rocker over three red chevrons, with the diamond trade badge inset between the stripes.

===== Specialties (1942–1948) =====
- Specialist A: Athletic Instructor, Physical Training Instructor
- Specialist C: Classification Interviewer
- Specialist CW: Chemical Warfareman (USCG)
- Specialist D: Dog Handler (USCG), Horse Handler (USCG), Dog Patrol (USCG)
- Specialist E: Recreation and Welfare Assistant, Motion Picture Service Booker
- Specialist F: Fire Fighter
- Specialist G: Gunnery Instructor, Aviation Free Gunnery Instructor, Anti-Aircraft Gunnery Instructor
- Specialist I: I.B.M. Operator, Punch Card Accounting Machine Operator
- Specialist M: Mail Clerk
- Specialist O: Inspector of Naval Material
- Specialist P: Photographic Specialist, Motion Picture Technician, Photo Laboratory Specialist, Photogrammetry Specialist
- Specialist PR: Public Relations (USCG)
- Specialist PS: Port Security Patrolman (USCG)
- Specialist Q: Communications Specialist, Cryptologist, Cryptanalyst, Radio Intelligence Technician, Registered Publications Clerk
- Specialist R: Recruiter
- Specialist S: Entertainer [1942], Shore Patrol and Security [1943–1948], Master-at-Arms (WAVE), Personnel Supervisor (WAVE)
- Specialist T : Teacher, Instructor
- Specialist TR: Transportationman (USCG)
- Specialist U: Utility (WAVE) [1943], Stewardess (WAVE) [1943]
- Specialist V: Transport Airman
- Specialist W: Chaplain's Assistant
- Specialist X: Specialist (Not Elsewhere Classified) [1943–1948]. Air Station Operations, Artist, Cartographer, Intelligence, Key Punch Operator, Pigeon Trainer, Plastics Expert, Public Information, Special Projects, Strategic Services (OSS), Switchboard Operator, Topographic Draftsman, Visual Training Aids.
- Specialist Y: Control Tower Operator

==== Emergency Service ratings (1948–1974) ====
The Navy's use of the specialist grade was reorganized in 1948 to integrate them into the petty officer structure. The assigned letters and job titles changed several times in the rank's history.

Some positions were reclassified as Emergency Service Ratings (ESRs) from 1948 to 1957 and Emergency Ratings (ERs) from 1957 to 1965. All personnel holding an Emergency Service rating were members of the Naval Reserve subject to activation only in time of war or national emergency. Their specialty letters had a prefix of "ES" added and were different than that of those in regular service.

A pruning and absorption or discontinuing of specialty ratings commenced between 1957 and 1964 and nearly all of the remaining specialties were discontinued in 1965. The sole remaining specialty was ESK (ES Specialty (K) – "Telecommunications Censorship Technician"). It was renamed "Information Security Specialist" in 1972 and disestablished in 1974.

=== United States Space Force ===
On 1 February 2021, the United States Space Force established the rank of specialist for pay grades E-1 to E-4. Specifically, the rank of specialist 1 replaced airman basic (E-1), the rank of specialist 2 replaced airman (E-2), the rank of specialist 3 replaced airman first class (E-3), and the rank of specialist 4 replaced senior airman (E-4). Specialist 4 ranks below sergeant. Verbal address for all four grades is just Specialist. On 20 September 2021, new rank insignias for all enlisted guardians, including the specialists, were revealed. These new insignias replaced the U.S. Air Force enlisted rank insignias that had been worn by enlisted guardians since the foundation of the Space Force on 20 December 2019.

Uniformed services pay grade	E-4		E-3	E-2	E-1
United States Space Force					
United States Space Force	Specialist 4 (Spc4)		Specialist 3 (Spc3)	Specialist 2 (Spc2)	Specialist 1 (Spc1)
Army	Corporal	Specialist	Private first class	Private	Private
USMC	Corporal		Lance corporal	Private first class	Private
USN & USCG	Petty officer third class		Seaman	Seaman apprentice	Seaman recruit
USAF	Senior airman		Airman first class	Airman	Airman basic
NATO code	OR-4		OR-3	OR-2	OR-1

== See also ==
- Specialist officer, military rank in Sweden
