= Unit Deployment Program =

Military assignment system

The Unit Deployment Program (UDP) is a system for assigning deployments of the United States Marine Corps. To reduce the number of unaccompanied tours and improve unit continuity, the Commandant of the Marine Corps, (CMC) established it to provide for the deployment of units to the Western Pacific (WESTPAC) for periods of approximately six months. The initial program was a six-phased evolution that sequenced infantry battalions and aircraft squadrons/detachments into WESTPAC deployments, thus eliminating the 12-month permanent change of station assignments for personnel assigned to these units. The program commenced in October 1977 and has proceeded through the six phases. In August 1985, tank companies began phasing into the program but following Southwest Asia, were discontinued. In Fiscal Year 1987 (FY87) and FY88, Amphibious Assault Vehicle (AAV) companies and direct support artillery batteries were phased in and later, Light Armored Reconnaissance (LAR) companies were also included in the program. The Marine Corps’ objective is to adhere as closely as possible to a six-month period of deployment away from a unit's Continental United States (CONUS) home base. In the case of Hawaii-based infantry battalions, which employ a three-battalion rotation base, a seven-month period of deployment is executed to support the Unit Cohesion Program and efficient staffing of first term Marines. It must be understood, however, that shipping or airlift schedule variations, and exercise or contingency operations will occasionally necessitate longer or shorter deployments for participating units. It is imperative that all personnel involved in these deployments be kept fully informed of planned deployment duration and subsequent deployment schedule changes.

== Assignment and distribution ==
The UDP is an alternate method of meeting the Marine Corps’ manpower commitment. CMC has directed that the Deputy Commandant for Manpower and Reserve Affairs is responsible for the assignment of company grade officer and enlisted personnel into all units participating in the UDP. This responsibility is exercised through a series of monitored command codes (MCCs). This centralized control of assignments is in keeping with U.S. Department of Defense (DoD) directives concerning individual assignments for Marines and the operational requirement for uniform staffing. Concurrent with the assumption of this responsibility is the requirement to establish standing operating procedures to provide coordination between Headquarters, U. S. Marine Corps (HQMC) and operational force commands concerning manpower-related matters in deploying units.

=== Staffing ===
A key difference between command staffing and unit deployment staffing is the requirement to stabilize a unit's personnel for the duration of the deployment. Assignment efforts must identify replacements for Marines who cannot participate in the deployment either because of expiration of active service (EAS), permanent change of station (PCS) orders, or other circumstances. The important difference for the deploying unit is that, while these Marines are chargeable, they are non-deployable and therefore, must be replaced. The point at which the deployable versus chargeable distinction is made occurs, at a minimum, six months prior to embarkation; however, most assignments are initiated six months prior to the estimated date of arrival. Consequently, assignment monitors at HQMC will begin to measure unit deployment strengths as early as one year prior to deployment. Even though most assignments will be identified closer, commanders must recognize that deployment-related Marine Corps Total Force System (MCTFS) entries have a critical impact on unit staffing during the predeployment period. Erroneous or missing information will result in an excessive administrative workload and may contribute to reduced personnel readiness or key billet shortages.

In addition to the MCTFS data, Deployment Staffing Reports (DSRs) are used to facilitate proper assignment of deployable Marines. DSRs are addressed in detail via message traffic to deploying units possessing a dedicated MCC. A year prior to the scheduled deployment, HQMC (MMEA) issues an implementation message. This message explains the DSRs, establishes staffing targets, sets "lock-on," identifies predicted entry-level school graduate arrivals, and directs submission of a monthly DSR to HQMC (MMEA-12). This report establishes a dialogue that ensures staffing of the unit by lock-on, a date when a unit has received full staffing with deployable Marines. Synchronized unit cohesion units receive staffing of their deployable Marines on a varied schedule (between 8–12 months prior to deployment) based on their fill window.

== Pay entitlements while on UDP ==
While Marines are deployed, they could be entitled to several monetary entitlements to help in offset the expense of being deployed, especially for those with families.

=== Career Sea Pay ===
Career sea pay is payable to Marines in the grade of corporal or above upon permanent or temporary assignment to sea duty. Rates are based on the amount of sea duty accumulated by the Marine. Instructions concerning entitlement conditions are contained in Volume 7A, Chapter 18 of the Department of Defense Financial Management Regulation (DoDFMR). Career sea pay is composed of two elements, history and pay, which are computed on a 30-day month basis. MCO P1080.40 outlines the unit diary reporting requirements for career sea duty history and career sea duty pay.

=== Deployed Per Diem ===
The Joint Travel Regulations (JTR) authorizes payment of standard or flat rate per diem, commonly referred to as deployed per diem, for members of units deployed overseas. The authority to determine rates for deployed per diem and the mechanics of their use has been delegated to the CMC by the Secretary of the Navy. MCO 7220.39, Standard/Flat Rate Per Diem Allowances, implements the deployed per diem allowances for UDP units. Deployed per diem rates are published by HQMC semiannually via MARADMIN message (MCBul 7220). Funding responsibility for deployed per diem resides with HQMC(MP). MCO P1080.40 contains procedures and MCTFS reporting requirements for commencement, termination, and adjusting the entitlement to deployed per diem.

=== Family Separation Allowance (FSA) ===
FSA-Type II provides compensation for added expenses incurred because of enforced family separation due to a Marine's assignment. Volume 7A, Chapter 27 of the DoDFMR defines FSA-Type II eligibility requirements. MCO P1080.40 contains unit diary reporting requirements for the FSA-Type II allowance.

== Navy personnel ==
Since the Marine Corps does not have any chaplains or medical personnel, it relies on the Navy to provide this support. Navy personnel selected for assignment shall have an end of active obligated service (EOS) sufficient to complete the unit deployment plus one month for transition. All enlisted personnel assigned must be physically qualified to perform their required duties prior to deployment.

== See also ==
- Officer Qualification Record (OQR)
- Unit cohesion
