= CPC Gangbangs =

Garage rock band from Montreal

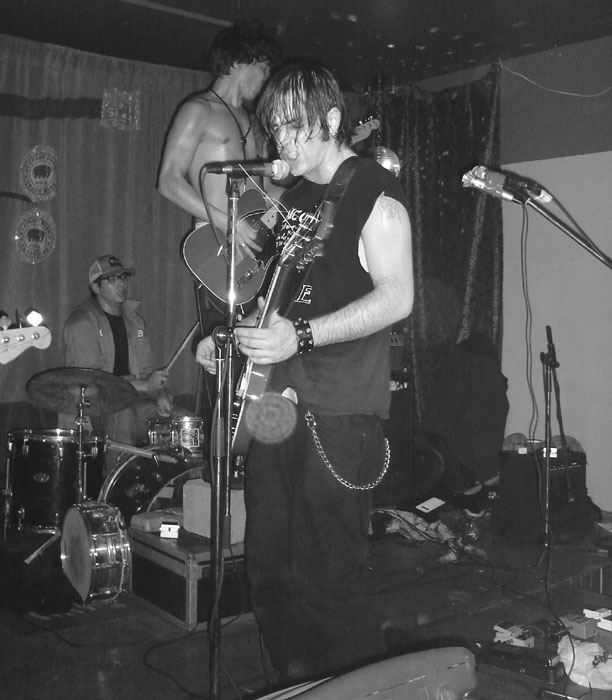
- CPC Gangbangs playing live in 2005

Background information
- Origin: Montreal, Quebec, Canada
- Genres: Garage punk Garage rock Rock 'n' Roll
- Years active: 2001–2008
- Labels: Swami Records; P.Trash Records; Die Slaughterhaus Records; Seeing Eye Records; Profet Records
- Members: Paul Spence; Choyce; Danny Marks; Tommy Kitsos; Riccardo Lucchesi

CPC Gangbangs were a Montreal, Quebec-based garage punk band, composed of former members of bands Les Sexareenos (1999–2002), The Spaceshits (1995–1999), Lyle Sheraton and the Daylight Lovers (1997–1999), Grime, and Milky Ways.

== History ==
CPC Gangbangs was established in 2001 as The Gangbangs by Daylight Lovers bassist Roy Vucino who used the stage name Choyce. It was originally intended as a punk band influenced by the likes of Black Flag. Its first single was released in 2002 by High School Refuse Records, titled "When All Turns To Shit."

In early 2003, the band was renamed CPC Gangbangs, and guitarist and vocalist Paul Spence, (previously a member of the punk rock band Lyle Sheraton and the Daylight Lovers, and co-star of the mockumentary cult classic FUBAR: The Movie), joined the band. Spence and Choyce shared songwriting duties and stage presence evenly. After entering and completing a drug detoxification program, Choyce returned to the band with renewed health and incorporated experiences of crime and hard drug-related experiences in the lyrics of songs for the band. He also included imagery and lyrical content influenced by Aleister Crowley and Austin Osman Spare. While playing mainly garage punk, CPC Gangbangs incorporated elements of space rock and thrash metal into their music. With this lineup, the CPC Gangbangs performed live shows regularly in Montreal and later in Toronto.

The group's debut LP Mutilation Nation was released in 2007 on Swami Records. The band then went out on tour in support of the album. That year the band released a single, "The Broken Glass".

Following the departure of key members and the arrest of another in the US, Choyce released a statement declaring the band's dissolution in 2008. Some of the members formed a new outfit under the name Red Mass, and continued to use the imagery and Crowley influences of the previous band.

== Discography ==
=== Albums ===
Year	Title	Label	Other information
2007	Mutilation Nation	Swami	First full-length LP.

=== EPs & singles ===
Year	Title	Label	Other information
2007	World War III 7"	Profet Records	Limited run of 500 copies; Catalog No. PR10
2007	The Broken Glass 7"	Seeing Eye Records	Picture disc; Catalog No. SE005; B-side: "Rich Rich Rich"
2007	Teenage Crimewave 7"	Die Slaughterhaus Records	Limited run of 500 copies; Catalog No. DSH015b; B-side: "Blood on the Wall"
