= The Stunt Driver =

2026 Canadian historical comedy film

- American theatrical release poster
- Directed by: Michael Dowse
- Written by: Michael Dowse
- Produced by: Jennifer Wilson; Michael Dowse; Macdara Kelleher; Eoin Egan
- Starring: Jay Baruchel; Ed Helms; Ben Foster; Laurence Leboeuf; Dan Bakkedahl
- Cinematography: Sara Mishara
- Edited by: Reginald Harkema
- Music by: Cristobal Tapia de Veer
- Production companies: Cardinal Films; Wild Atlantic Pictures
- Distributed by: Mongrel Media
- Release dates: September 11, 2026 (TIFF); September 25, 2026 (Canada)
- Running time: 99 minutes
- Country: Canada
- Language: English
- Box office: $178,476

The Stunt Driver is a 2026 Canadian historical comedy film written and directed by Michael Dowse, based on the life of Canadian daredevil stuntman Ken Carter. The cast is led by Jay Baruchel, Ed Helms, Ben Foster, Laurence Leboeuf, and Dan Bakkedahl.

== Premise ==
In the 1970s, stuntman Ken Carter, known as "The Mad Canadian" due to his daredevil stunts, plans to drive a rocket car across the Saint-Laurent river, from a 90-foot-high ramp.

== Cast ==
- Jay Baruchel as Ken Carter
- Ed Helms as Dick Keller
- Ben Foster as Evel Knievel
- Laurence Leboeuf as Gloria
- Dan Bakkedahl as Bill Wilkins
- Joe Cobden as Bob Fortier
- Marc Beaupré as Danny Lafortune
- Jonathan Cherry as Ricky

== Production ==
The film is written and directed by Michael Dowse and is based on the true story of the "Mad Canadian" stunt driver who had fame with his daredevil stunts, and the National Film Board of Canada's 1981 documentary The Devil at Your Heels. It is produced by Dowse and Jennifer Wilson through Cardinal Films with Macdara Kelleher and Eoin Egan for Wild Atlantic Pictures.

The cast is led by Jay Baruchel. Ed Helms, Ben Foster, Laurence Leboeuf and Dan Bakkedahl, Joe Cobden and Marc Beaupré, joined the cast in October 2025.

Principal photography was underway in Montreal in September 2025. Filming locations included the St. Lawrence River between Boucherville and Varennes, Quebec in Canada, the following month.

== Release ==
The film premiered at the 2026 Toronto International Film Festival, and was theatrically released on September 25, 2026.

== Reception ==
On the review aggregator website Rotten Tomatoes, 73% of 41 critics' reviews are positive, with an average rating of 6.4/10. Metacritic, which uses a weighted average, assigned the film a score of 60 out of 100, based on 10 critics, indicating "mixed or average" reviews.
