= RLAS =

RLAS may refer to:

- Rancho Los Amigos Scale, a medical scale used to assess individuals after a closed head injury
- Regional-Level Application System, a US Army personnel database is a successor to SIDPERS
- Royal Lancashire Agricultural Society, organizers of the Royal Lancashire Show
