= Vancouver Film Critics Circle Awards 2010 =

Annual Canadian film awards ceremony

The winners of the 11th Vancouver Film Critics Circle Awards, honoring the best in filmmaking in 2010, were announced on January 11, 2011.

== Winners and nominees ==
=== International ===
Category	Winners and nominees	Films
Best Film	David Fincher	The Social Network
Best Film	Darren Aronofsky	Black Swan
Best Film	Joel Coen and Ethan Coen	True Grit
Best Actor	Colin Firth	The King's Speech
Best Actor	Jesse Eisenberg	The Social Network
Best Actor	James Franco	127 Hours
Best Actress	Jennifer Lawrence	Winter's Bone
Best Actress	Annette Bening	The Kids Are All Right
Best Actress	Natalie Portman	Black Swan
Best Supporting Actor	Christian Bale	The Fighter
Best Supporting Actor	John Hawkes	Winter's Bone
Best Supporting Actor	Geoffrey Rush	The King's Speech
Best Supporting Actress	Hailee Steinfeld	True Grit
Best Supporting Actress	Amy Adams	The Fighter
Best Supporting Actress	Melissa Leo	The Fighter
Best Director	David Fincher	The Social Network
Best Director	Darren Aronofsky	Black Swan
Best Director	Joel Coen and Ethan Coen	True Grit
Best Screenplay	Aaron Sorkin	The Social Network
Best Screenplay	Joel Coen and Ethan Coen	True Grit
Best Screenplay	Christopher Nolan	Inception
Best Documentary	Banksy	Exit Through the Gift Shop
Best Documentary	Charles Ferguson	Inside Job
Best Documentary	Davis Guggenheim	Waiting for "Superman"
Best Foreign Language Film	Olivier Assayas	Carlos
Best Foreign Language Film	Jacques Audiard	A Prophet
Best Foreign Language Film	Bong Joon-ho	Mother
Best Foreign Language Film	Juan José Campanella	The Secret in Their Eyes

=== Canadian ===
Category	Winners and nominees	Films
Best Film	Denis Villeneuve	Incendies
Best Film	Lixin Fan	Last Train Home
Best Film	Bruce McDonald	Trigger
Best Actor	Paul Giamatti	Barney's Version
Best Actor	Jay Baruchel	The Trotsky
Best Actor	Paul Spence	FUBAR 2
Best Actress	Lubna Azabal	Incendies
Best Actress	Molly Parker	Trigger
Best Actress	Tracy Wright	Trigger
Best Supporting Actor	Dustin Hoffman	Barney's Version
Best Supporting Actor	Jay Brazeau	Fathers & Sons
Best Supporting Actor	Maxim Gaudette	Incendies
Best Supporting Actress	Delphine Chanéac	Splice
Best Supporting Actress	Mélissa Désormeaux-Poulin	Incendies
Best Supporting Actress	Minnie Driver	Barney's Version
Best Director	Denis Villeneuve	Incendies
Best Director	Denis Côté	Curling
Best Director	Bruce McDonald	Trigger
Best British Columbia Film	Carl Bessai	Fathers & Sons
Best British Columbia Film	Sturla Gunnarsson	Force of Nature: The David Suzuki Movie
Best British Columbia Film	Charles Officer	Mighty Jerome
