= Business Transformation Agency =

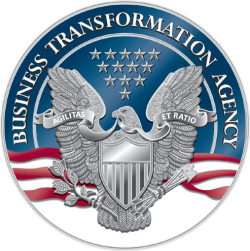

Agency overview
- Formed: October 7, 2005
- Dissolved: September 2011
- Superseding agency: Functions absorbed by various DoD components
- Jurisdiction: United States Department of Defense
- Headquarters: The Pentagon, Arlington, Virginia, U.S.
- Agency executive: Paul A. Brinkley, Director (2006–2007)
- Parent agency: Office of the Deputy Secretary of Defense

Footnotes
- Established by directive issued by Gordon R. England, Deputy Secretary of Defense, on 7 Oct 2005. Disestablishment announced 9 Aug 2010; completed by September 2011.

The Business Transformation Agency (BTA) was an organization of the United States Department of Defense responsible for guiding the department's business operations modernization. The BTA was active from 2005 until its closure in 2011.

The agency aimed to foster business operations support for the American warfighter and sought to provide accountability to the American taxpayer by systematically improving DoD's business processes, ERP systems and investment governance. Aiming to provide consistency, consolidation and coordination across the Department of Defense, the BTA produced the Enterprise Transition Plan (ETP)—an integrated and executable roadmap that observed the standards laid out in the Business Enterprise Architecture (BEA). The ETP and the BEA aimed to transform DoD business operations to achieve improved warfighter support while enabling financial accountability across the Department of Defense.

The Business Transformation Agency was established by Deputy Secretary of Defense Gordon R. England on October 7, 2005. The founding executives of the BTA were Co-directors Thomas Modly, Deputy Under Secretary of Defense for Financial Management, and Paul Brinkley, Deputy Under Secretary of Defense for Business Transformation; Director of Transformation Planning and Performance, David Fisher; Director of Transformation Priorities and Requirements, Radha Sekar; Director of Investment Management, Paul Ketrick; Director of Warfighter Support, Bob Love; Director of Information and Federation Management, David Scantling; and Director of Agency Operations, Navy Captain Michael Murphy.

In August 2010, Secretary of Defense Robert Gates announced that the BTA would be disbanded as part of a broader initiative to cut costs and streamline the Department of Defense. Gates explained that the agency’s functions would be absorbed by other parts of the department and that the BTA, along with other offices, would be closed. This decision was part of a campaign to reduce service support contractors and eliminate redundancy across the defense enterprise.

The formal disestablishment of the Business Transformation Agency was completed by September 2011.

Directors and senior leadership
Tenure	Leader	Role/Notes
Oct 2005 – Nov 2006	Paul A. Brinkley; Thomas Modly	Founding co-directors
Nov 2006 – Feb 2007	David M. Fisher	Acting Director
Feb 2007 – 2010	David M. Fisher	Director (first official)
Jan 2011 – Sep 2011	David M. Wennergren	Director (final; oversaw closure)

== Business transformation ==
In the last decades of the 20th century, the Department of Defense business model was configured to support a military dependent on large-scale weapons systems and prepared for sustained, predictable battlefield engagements in specific parts of the world. With the challenges that face the U.S. military in the 21st century, the DoD established the Business Transformation Agency to allow the defense business enterprise to adapt, flex, and react effectively to the needs of its modern joint warfighter. Transformation seeks to make DoD business operations more agile, lean and rapid. The department called its approach to this need for transformation “federated”—meaning that uniformed and civilian leadership at all levels in the DoD were considered accountable for transformation progress. This effort was announced to be structured to support four strategic objectives:

- Develop and provide support for U.S. joint warfighting capability
- Enable rapid access to information for strategic decisions by fostering the development of interoperable and efficient ERP systems
- Reduce the cost of Defense Business operations
- Improve financial stewardship to the American people

The Defense Business Systems Management Committee, chaired by the Deputy Secretary of Defense, led the Transformation endeavor. The BTA was intended to serve as a catalyst for transformation by coordinating and integrating transformation activity at the DoD enterprise level. As of 2020, the Defense Business Systems Management Committee still functions to oversee development and management of business systems within the DoD.

== Organization ==
The BTA was divided into 8 directorates organized around the functions of supporting defense business transformation. Overseeing these directorates was Director David M. Fisher, author of Optimize Now (or else!) (ISBN 0-595-29837-0), a guide to successful organizational transformation.

=== Defense Business Systems Acquisition Executive ===
The DBSAE provided direct oversight of 27 department-wide ERP programs. Notable among these programs are the Defense Travel System (DTS), the Defense Integrated Military Human Resources System (DIMHRS) and the Federal Voting Assistance Program (FVAP).

=== Enterprise Integration ===
EI worked to ensure fast adoption of DoD-wide information and process standards as defined in the BEA. They sought to eliminate burdensome processes that hinder successful, speedy deployment of ERP capabilities within the DoD components.

=== Enterprise Planning and Investment ===
EP&I provided investment management leadership for DoD Enterprise-level business systems. It coordinates the efforts of DoD's acquisition policy as outlined in the DoD 5000 series pertaining to business systems. The Directorate also provides input for the Quadrennial Defense Review. EP&I is responsible for the Business Enterprise Architecture (BEA), the Enterprise Transition Plan (ETP), and the March Congressional Report (MCR). EP&I was the result of a merger of the former directorates Transformation Priorities & Requirements and Investment Management.

=== Priorities & Requirements – Financial Management ===
P&R-FM was the primary link to the Principal Staff Assistants within the Office of the Secretary of Defense (OSD) and other DoD-level organizations; in particular the Defense Finance and Accounting Service (DFAS) and Office of the Secretary of Defense (Comptroller). They ensured that the financial visibility priorities and requirements of these client organizations are reflected in the BEA and ETP, and in the guidance for business system investment management.

=== Priorities & Requirements – Human Resource Management ===
P&R-HRM was the primary link to the Office of the Under Secretary of Defense (Personnel and Readiness) regarding all human resource management related transformation activities. They aligned functional priorities and requirements of these client organizations in the BEA and ETP, and in the guidance for business system investment management.

=== Priorities & Requirements – Supply Chain Management ===
P&R-SCM served as the primary link to the Principal Staff Assistants within the Office of the Secretary of Defense and other DoD-level organizations as they relate to Supply Chain Management. They ensure that functional priorities Material Visibility, Common Supplier Engagement, Acquisition Visibility, and Real Property Accountability are reflected in the BEA and the ETP, and in the guidance for business system investment management.

=== Warfighter Requirements ===
WR identified and resolved urgent DoD business issues that are directly affecting the troops. The WR also serves as an advocate for soldiers within the BTA. WR projects included economic roundtables that brought together organizations responsible for Mideast economic redevelopment with personnel who are about to be deployed to Iraq and Afghanistan. These roundtables established a working relationship that can be continued once they are deployed.

=== Chief of Staff ===
The office of the Chief of Staff provided operational support for the employees at the BTA. This included sections managing personnel, pay, planning, budgeting, infrastructure, IT, and internal management activities.

== Closure ==
In August 2010, Secretary of Defense Robert Gates announced a series of cost-saving measures that included the planned closure of the Business Transformation Agency (BTA). The move was part of a broader initiative to reduce overhead, eliminate redundancy, and reallocate funding toward direct warfighter support. Gates cited unsatisfactory progress in the Department of Defense’s insourcing efforts and the failure to achieve expected savings as primary drivers behind the restructuring. Under the plan, the BTA, along with several other Defense offices—including the Office of the Assistant Secretary of Defense for Networks and Information Integration and the Joint Staff’s Command, Control, Communications and Computer Systems directorate—was slated for closure. He stated that the agency’s functions would be absorbed by other components within the department.

The BTA, which employed approximately 360 personnel and operated with an annual budget of US$340 million, was officially designated for elimination during Gates’s press briefing at the Pentagon on August 9, 2010. Gates explained that the agency’s responsibilities would be redistributed to other DoD offices in order to streamline IT infrastructure, eliminate redundant management structures, and reprioritize resources toward operational readiness and modernization.

The decision to close the BTA was widely interpreted as part of a broader strategy to protect the defense budget from future Congressional cuts amid growing national deficits. According to the Washington Post, Gates framed the closures as necessary to replace a “culture of endless money” with one of “savings and restraint,” stating that the moves would help stave off deeper, more disruptive reductions in future defense appropriations.

Although the BTA was deactivated as part of what some described as a “short-term budget drill,” its founding leaders later reflected on the agency’s establishment and purpose as a bold experiment in driving business reform within the Department of Defense. Writing in 2016, former BTA executives described the agency as a deliberate attempt to create a “permanent change agent” that would outlast changes in leadership and serve as a disruptive force to challenge bureaucratic inefficiency. The BTA had been seeded with private-sector talent under special congressional hiring authorities and designed to serve as a temporary assignment hub for high-performing individuals—emphasizing innovation, collaboration, and customer focus.

A 2016 retrospective by former BTA leaders stated that the agency’s mission faced internal resistance due to its cultural demands for accountability and operational reform, noting that the agency was “a petri dish” meant to cultivate a new DoD business culture. Despite its short operational lifespan, proponents argued that the BTA demonstrated the importance of top-level leadership support, aligned incentives, and persistent cultural change in achieving meaningful transformation within government institutions. They also warned that the agency’s dissolution should serve as a cautionary tale for future efforts to reform large public-sector organizations.

== See also ==
- Business Transformation
