= Fubar Age of Computer =

Canadian mockumentary television series

- Created by: North Darling; Michael Dowse; David Lawrence; Immanuela Lawrence; Paul J. Spence
- Starring: David Lawrence; Paul Spence; North Darling; Maxime D. Pomerleau; Terra Hazelton
- Country of origin: Canada
- No. of seasons: 1
- No. of episodes: 8 (list of episodes)

Production
- Executive producers: Michael Dowse; David Lawrence; Paul Spence
- Running time: 22 minutes
- Production companies: Busted Tranny Productions; Rogers Media; Vice Media

Original release
- Network: Viceland; Citytv
- Release: November 3 – December 22, 2017

Fubar Age of Computer is a Canadian mockumentary television series based on the films of the same name. Starring David Lawrence and Paul Spence, the series premiered on Viceland on November 3, 2017 and on Citytv on November 5, 2017.

== Premise ==
After fleeing wildfires in Fort McMurray, Alberta, Terry and Dean discover the Internet for the first time.

== Cast and characters ==
- David Lawrence as Terry Cahill
- Paul Spence as Dean Murdoch
- North Darling as Shank
- Maxime D. Pomerleau as Jacinthe Ouellette
- Terra Hazelton as Trish Cahill
- Andrew Sparacino as Tron

== Series overview ==
Season	Episodes	Originally released	
Season	Episodes	First released	Last released
1	8	November 3, 2017	December 22, 2017

=== Season 1 (2017) ===
No.	Title	Directed by	Written by	Original release date	US viewers (millions)
1	"Afterbirth"	Michael Dowse	North Darling, Michael Dowse, David Lawrence, Immanuela Lawrence & Paul J. Spence	November 3, 2017	N/A
Terry leaves Trish for good, and Dean vows to finally record his concept album. Terry and Dean find refuge in cousin Shank's basement after fleeing wildfires in Fort McMurray.
2	"Blindin' Love"	Michael Dowse	Immanuela Lawrence	November 10, 2017	N/A
Terry catfishes his wife Trish online. Dean holds band auditions while Shank reunites with his disabled daughter Wheels.
3	"D.I.Y.'er Done"	Michael Dowse	Michael Dowse & David Lawrence	November 17, 2017	N/A
While Shank is away, Terry hosts the basement's first international Airbnb guest while helping Dean's band record in their DIY studio.
4	"High Rollers"	Michael Dowse	North Darling & David Lawrence	November 24, 2017	N/A
Night Seeker books a gig but Dean's lyrics clashes with feminists; Terry launches a marijuana drone delivery service.
5	"Power"	Michael Dowse	Matt Silver & Paul J. Spence	December 1, 2017	N/A
Terry's antics in a self defense video. Dean goes to extremes to get his voice back in time for a morning talk show.
6	"War"	Michael Dowse	Dan Dillabough & Michael Dowse	December 8, 2017	N/A
Tron stops by fresh out of rehab to collaborate on a track with Night Seeker; War ensues in the basement when Shank cuts the Internet.
7	"Bye Bye BeerBot"	Michael Dowse	North Darling & Paul J. Spence	December 15, 2017	N/A
Trish wants in on Terry's BeerBot business. Dean makes a low budget music video for his band Night Seeker.
8	"All You Can Give'r"	Michael Dowse	Michael Dowse & David Lawrence	December 22, 2017	N/A
Dean stays in Calgary while everyone else travels to the Dominican Republic to save Terry's dying Nigerian business partner.

== Reception ==
John Semley of The Globe and Mail said "Much of Age of Computer's humour – from its jokes about real-world wildfires to sight gags about way-too-steep wheelchair ramps – may strike many people as galling. But as in the previous, big screen Fubar adventures, Terry and Dean's beautiful obliviousness produces a genuine sympathy."

According to Google, 91% of its users liked Fubar Age of Computer.
