= It's All Gone Pete Tong =

- Film poster
- Directed by: Michael Dowse
- Written by: Michael Dowse
- Produced by: James Richardson; Allan Niblo; Elizabeth Yake
- Starring: Paul Kaye; Beatriz Batarda; Kate Magowan; Mike Wilmot
- Cinematography: Balazs Bolygo
- Edited by: Stuart Gazzard
- Music by: Graham Massey
- Production companies: Vertigo Films; True West Films
- Distributed by: Alliance Atlantis; Odeon Films (Canada); Redbus Film Distribution (United Kingdom); HanWay Films (International)
- Release dates: 12 September 2004 (TIFF); 26 May 2005 (United Kingdom)
- Running time: 90 minutes
- Countries: Canada; United Kingdom
- Language: English
- Budget: $2 million
- Box office: $2.2 million

It's All Gone Pete Tong is a 2004 British-Canadian mockumentary-drama film about a DJ (Paul Kaye) who goes completely deaf. The title uses a British cockney rhyming slang phrase from the 1990s and 2000s known as (Pete Tong = "wrong"), referring to the BBC Radio 1 DJ Pete Tong who cameos in the film. English singer Gary Haisman was behind the popular clubbing phrase "It's all gone Pete Tong," which later inspired the title of the film.

It won two awards at the US Comedy Arts Festival for Best Feature and Best Actor (Kaye) and swept the Gen Art Film Festival awards (Grand Jury and Audience). It was filmed on location in Ibiza and shot entirely in HD.

Ibiza locations used in the movie include the music venues Pacha, Amnesia, Privilege, DC10 and the historic Pike's Hotel and Cala Llonga beach.

== Plot ==
Frankie Wilde is a British music producer and DJ based in Ibiza. After years of playing in nightclubs he loses his hearing, first apparent when he hears a high-pitched whine during an Arsenal football match on TV. At this time, Frankie is making his next album with his "two Austrian mates" Alfonse and Horst, but his hearing degrades rapidly and progress stagnates. Frankie refuses to acknowledge his problem until a gig in Amnesia, when he cannot hear the second channel in his headphones and crossfades songs without first beatmatching them. When the crowd boos him, he throws the turntable and the mixer onto the dance floor, and is forcibly removed from the club.

Frankie agrees to see a doctor, who tells him he has lost hearing in one ear and has 20% remaining in the other. Frankie is warned that unless he stops abusing drugs and listening to loud noises, he will soon be completely deaf, and that the use of a hearing aid is for emergencies only as it will further degrade his hearing. During a recording session, Frankie confesses the full nature of his hearing loss to Alfonse. He inserts his hearing aid to demonstrate and, overwhelmed by the sudden sound exposure, leans close to one of the monitor speakers. A frustrated Horst then smashes a guitar into an amplifier whose volume Frankie has maximized. The noise is excruciating and the feedback bursts his eardrum, knocking Frankie unconscious and leaving him permanently deaf.

Without his hearing, Frankie cannot complete his album. He loses his recording contract and his manager Max abandons him. Soon after, his wife Sonya leaves him. Frankie shuts himself into his home, which he has "soundproofed" with pillows in a desperate bid to recover his hearing, and his drug use intensifies. He sinks into a heavy depression, repeatedly throwing his body against the walls, and wrapping Roman candles around his head, either an attempt at suicide or a drastic way to recover his hearing, but dives into his swimming pool before they could ignite. Frankie flushes all his drugs down a toilet and is confronted by a recurring vision of a menacing cocaine badger. When he fights and kills it, he learns that the badger is, in fact, himself.

Frankie finds a deaf organization and meets Penelope, who coaches him in lip-reading. They become close, and eventually intimate. He confides his unhappiness at losing music, and she helps him perceive sound through visual and tactile methods instead. Frankie manages to devise a system for mixing songs, in which he watches an oscilloscope trace while resting his feet on the pulsating speakers. Using this system, he manages to produce a new mix CD (Hear No Evil) entirely by himself. He delivers it to Max, who is wildly pleased – particularly by the potential of exploiting Frankie's disability to increase record sales. He has Frankie take part in promotions that are increasingly offensive and insensitive to deaf people, of which Penelope disapproves.

Max convinces Frankie to play live at Pacha as a career comeback, despite Frankie's insistence that he has nothing to prove to his critics. The gig goes exceedingly well, and many claim it shows even greater talent than his early work. After the show, Frankie and Penelope disappear from Max and the music scene altogether. In a talking heads sequence, characters speculate on where he is now, if alive. As the film ends, we see Frankie disguised as a homeless street musician, who is met by Penelope carrying their child. They affectionately walk together down a street, unrecognised. Frankie is shown teaching a group of deaf children how to perceive sound and enjoy music.

== Characters and cast ==
- Frankie Wilde (Paul Kaye) is the king of DJs, slowly losing his hearing, and soon to lose everything he thinks is important to him: his job, his fame and his trophy wife.
- Penelope (Beatriz Batarda) is the deaf lip-reading instructor who gives Frankie the tough love he never had and always needed.
- Sonya (Kate Magowan) is Frankie's supermodel wife. Her days are filled with deciding on what theme is more appropriate for their garden: Japanese or Spanish?
- Max Haggar (Mike Wilmot) is Frankie's agent. Overweight, balding and brashly obnoxious, Max is all about money and his mobile phone is his lifeline.
- Jack Stoddart (Neil Maskell) is the ruthless CEO of Motor Records who has no sympathy for Frankie. He says, "I didn't want a deaf DJ on the label. I didn't want the company to be touched with the deaf stamp. Well, business is tough and sometimes you have to make awkward decisions and I've made harder decisions than dropping the deaf DJ."

=== Cameos ===
Several actual professional DJs appear in the film, lending the film a sense of authenticity, like Carl Cox, Fatboy Slim and Pete Tong himself, who also executive produced the film. Others include Tiësto, Sarah Main, Barry Ashworth, Paul van Dyk and Lol Hammond.

Fubar rockers Paul Spence and David Lawrence, from Dowse's earlier film, also have cameos as Austrian hangers-on.

== Music ==
=== Soundtrack ===
The film's soundtrack was released by EMI on 4 October 2005 as a double disc soundtrack for the film. The 'Night' & 'Day' concept for the soundtrack album was conceived and compiled by Ben Cherrill, who was, at the time, A&R manager for Positiva Records/EMI. Additional production and mixing was by James Doman.

It's all gone pete tong: original soundtrack recording

Soundtrack album by Various Artists
- Released: 4 October 2005
- Genres: Soundtrack; House; Balearic house Electronic music Chill out Trance; Big beat Techno; Alternative rock Drum and bass
- Label: EMI
- Producer: Executive album producer – Ben Cherrill for Positiva Records

Track listing
CD 1

1. "Pacific State" – 808 State (exclusive mix)
2. "Cloud Watch" – Lol Hammond
3. "Dry Pool Suicide" – Graham Massey
4. "Moonlight Sonata" – Graham Massey
5. "Baby Piano" – Lol Hammond
6. "Ku Da Ta" – Pete Tong (Jay & Dylan McHugh Re-Work)
7. "Mirage" – Moroccan Blonde (Ben Cherrill, James Doman and Lol Hammond)
8. "Troubles" – Beta Band
9. "Parlez Moi D'Amour" – Lucienne Boyer
10. "Need To Feel Loved (Horizontal Mix)" – Reflekt
11. "It's Over" – Beta Band
12. "Halo (Goldfrapp Remix)" – Depeche Mode
13. "How Does It Feel?" – Afterlife
14. "Holdin' On" – Ferry Corsten
15. "Four-Four-Four" – Fragile State
16. "Music for a Found Harmonium" – Penguin Café Orchestra
17. "Learning to Lip-Read" – Graham Massey
18. "Good Vibrations" – The Beach Boys
19. "Interlude" – Ben Cherrill and James Doman
20. "White Lines" – Barefoot

CD 2

1. "Intro"
2. "DJs in a Row" – Schwab
3. "Flashdance (Raul Rincon Mix)" – Deep Dish
4. "Good 2 Go" – Juggernaut (Ben Cherrill and James Doman) Mixed With "Rock That House Musiq" – Christophe Monier and DJ Pascal feat. Impulsion
5. "Blue Water" – Black Rock
6. "Back to Basics" – Shapeshifters
7. "Up & Down" – Scent
8. "Serendipity" – Steve Mac & Pete Tong Presents Lingua Franca
9. "Plastic Dreams (Radio Edit)" – Jaydee
10. "Rock Your Body Rock" – Ferry Corsten
11. "Can You Hear Me Now" – Double Funk feat. Paul Kaye (Ben Cherrill and James Doman)
12. "Musak (Steve Lawler Mix)" – Trisco
13. "Yimanya" – Filterheadz
14. "Need To Feel Loved (Seb Fontaine and Jay P's Mix)" – Reflekt feat. Delline Bass
15. "More Intensity" – Pete Tong and Chris Cox
16. "Frenetic (Short Mix)" – Orbital

=== Score ===
Songs used in film but not included in the soundtrack:

1. "Al Sharp" – The Beta Band
2. "Flamenco" – Flamenco Ibiza
3. "Get On" – Moguai
4. "G-Spot" – Lol Hammond
5. "Hear No Evil" – Lol Hammond
6. "I Like It (Sinewave Surfer Mix)" – Narcotic Thrust
7. "Messa da Requiem" – Riccardo Muti/La Scala Milan
8. "Electronika" – Vada
9. "Rise Again" – DJ Sammy
10. "Ritcher Scale Madness" – ...And You Will Know Us by the Trail of Dead
11. "The Aviator" – Michael McCann
12. "Up & Down (Super Dub)" – Scent
13. "You Can't Hurry Love" – The Concretes
14. "Rock That House Musiq" – Impulsion

== Release ==
The film was premiered at the 2004 Toronto International Film Festival. It was released in the United States on 15 April 2005 and on 26 May in the United Kingdom.

=== Home media ===
The DVD was released on 20 September 2005. The U.S. version of the DVD includes 5.1 Dolby Digital, subtitles and several extras that were part of the online/web marketing campaign: Frankie Wilde: The Rise, Frankie Wilde: The Fall and Frankie Wilde: The Redemption.

== Reception ==
=== Commercial performance ===
The film made $2,226,603, a little under a quarter million above its $2 million budget.

=== Critical response ===
The film has a rating of 76% based on 71 reviews on the review aggregator website Rotten Tomatoes, the critical consensus stating, "Part raucous mockumentary, part drama-filled biopic, It's All Gone Pete Tong amuses and warms hearts with its touching, comic, and candid look at a musician faced with a career-ending handicap." On Metacritic, it has a score of 56 based on 22 reviews, indicating "mixed or average reviews".

Giving the film three stars, Roger Ebert says the film works because of its "heedless comic intensity", chronicling the rise and fall of Frankie Wilde in the film's first two acts "as other directors have dealt with emperors and kings".

Frankie may not be living the most significant life of our times, but tell that to Frankie. There is a kind of desperation in any club scene (as 24-Hour Party People memorably demonstrated); it can be exhausting, having a good time, and the relentless pursuit of happiness becomes an effort to recapture remembered bliss from the past.

Melissa Mohaupt writing in Exclaim! noted "resemblances to various hipster films about music, drugs, excess and failure" such as Trainspotting, Boogie Nights, yet it "never feels stale". There are plenty of quotable quips, and even Frankie's attempted suicide is "high-larious". She says the film manages to be "uplifting without being preachy or cheesy. There are important life lessons to be learned here, or you could just ignore them and enjoy some clever comedy."

Ken Eisner of The Georgia Straight liked the film's "zippy visual style, with sun-dappled primary colours and whirlwind editing to go with the hip pop tunes and block-rockin' beats". He appreciated the fact that Dowse does not milk the many cameos, though the two Fubar actors may have been a bit much. Dennis Harvey, writing for Variety, found those first two acts depressing and decidedly not as advertised (the film was hyped as another This is Spinal Tap), but Michael Dowse rescues the film with "a particularly deft transitional montage that begins with Frankie discovering the musical properties of vibration... segues into lead duo's first lovemaking, and goes on as Frankie re-connects with the dance rhythms he'd thought were lost to him".

Nick De Semlyen, writing for Empire, gave the film two stars, noting there were powerful moments in the film, but thought it was "too dark for casual viewers (or fans of Tong), too blunt to succeed as cult viewing". The Guardian's Peter Bradshaw gave the film one star, panning it as "breathtakingly charmless and humourless", writing that "Paul Kaye gives a frazzled, one-note performance", while the "appearances by real-life DJs should tip you off that any satire involved is of an essentially celebratory and sycophantic sort; the comedy is leaden, the drama is flat and the attitude to deaf people is Neanderthal".

=== Accolades ===
==== Awards ====
- Toronto International Film Festival, Best Canadian Feature – 2004
- US Comedy Arts Festival, Best Feature, Best Actor (Paul Kaye) – 2005
- Gen Art Film Festival, Grand Jury Award, Audience Award – 2005
- Vancouver Film Critics Circle, Best British Columbian Film – 2005
- Canadian Comedy Awards, Best Performance by a Male - Film (Mike Wilmot) – 2005
- Leo Awards Best Overall Sound, Best Sound Editing, Best Feature-Length Drama – 2005

==== Nominations ====
- Method Fest, Best Actor, Best Feature
- BIFA, Best Achievement in Production
- Genie Awards (8)

== Adaptations ==
The film was remade in Hindi by the Indian film director Neerav Ghosh, titled Soundtrack and was released in 2011.

== See also ==
- List of films featuring the deaf and hard of hearing
