= Jenny Wynter =

Female Australian Comedian

- Born: 1979 (age 46–47); Toowoomba, Queensland, Australia
- Occupations: Comedian, cabaret performer, writer, keynote speaker
- Years active: 2000s–present
- Notable work: Viking Mama, Unexpected Variety Show, Fully Made Up, How Me Parent Good, Funny Mummies
- Awards: United Solo Theatre Festival Best Variety Show Award, Pitch Perfect Award at Melbourne WebFest
- Website: jennywynter.com

Jenny Wynter (born 1979) is an Australian comedian, writer, cabaret performer, clown doctor, and keynote speaker. She is best known for her improvised solo shows, her touring organisation Funny Mummies, and her award-winning web series work.

== Early life and education ==
Wynter was born in Toowoomba, Queensland. She attended Fairholme College in Toowoomba and is an alumna of the Fairholme Old Girls’ Association (FOGA).

She experienced the death of her mother during early childhood and was subsequently raised by her grandmother. These experiences have influenced her professional focus on resilience, wellbeing, and mental health. In a 2015 ABC Radio National segment titled "Jenny’s Story", Wynter reflected on how the loss shaped her creative path and personal resilience.

== Career ==
Wynter trained in improvisational theatre with The Second City (USA), Loose Moose Theatre (Canada), and The Groundlings (USA). She has performed in comedy and cabaret festivals in Australia and internationally, including the Melbourne International Comedy Festival, Adelaide Fringe, the Museum of Comedy in London, and the Brighton Fringe. She has been featured in AussieTheatre’s “Fringe Fever” roundup of notable festival shows.

In 2016, Wynter won the Best Variety Show Award at the United Solo Theatre Festival in New York for her solo cabaret show An Unexpected Variety Show, directed by Gary Austin, founder of The Groundlings. She was also a finalist in the International Cabaret Contest.

In 2018, she created and starred in the comedy web series How Me Parent Good, a satirical take on parenting.

Wynter created and performed the solo cabaret show Viking Mama, which explores motherhood through a humorous, Viking-themed lens. The show premiered in Melbourne and received positive critical attention from Aussie Theatre, Concrete Playground, and Scenestr. The show won the inaugural Pitch Perfect Award at Melbourne WebFest.

Wynter runs the organisation and touring company Funny Mummies, which presents live comedy shows featuring mother‑comedians in regional and rural Australia.

She has appeared on ABC Television's Australian Story as part of a feature on clown doctors, and was profiled by The Saturday Paper and ABC News for her work entertaining children in hospitals.

Wynter has also performed at fundraising concerts including Rock the Recovery, broadcast on ABC Radio Brisbane.

== Recognition and media ==
Wynter has been interviewed in The Courier Mail on topics ranging from cabaret to life in regional Australia. She has spoken publicly about women in comedy.

Her radio appearances include interviews on ABC Radio National's Now Hear This program and Editor’s Choice.

Wynter has also been recognised in the screen industry: she was selected for the AACTA Pitch: Regional Landscapes program in partnership with Screenworks, and took part in Screen Queensland’s Writers’ Room initiative.

As a keynote speaker and MC, Wynter has worked with community groups and peak bodies including the Queensland Youth Housing Coalition, PeakCare Queensland and the Queensland Mental Health Week Awards
