= SIDPERS =

Standard Installation and Division Personnel Reporting System (SIDPERS) was the main database or, rather, databases for personnel accounting by the United States Army. The Active Army, US Army Reserve, and Army National Guard each had separate, largely incompatible databases, each bearing the name SIDPERS or a variation thereof. RC-SIDPERS was nominally designed for both reserve components (Army Reserve and Army National Guard), but was further adapted for use by the National Guard, to create NG-SIDPERS.

Until 1988, RC-SIDPERS was not accessible at the unit level, and unit administrators would mail database correction documents up their chain of command to their respective general officer command in order to update and/or correct SIDPERS. A separate, unconnected database, Unit Level Application System (ULAS, pronounced "you-lass") was available for unit administrators to maintain local personnel information. A PC-based application, built in PC-FOCUS, was fielded for beta testing in late 1988 within the 63rd Army Reserve Command and was expanded USAR-wide the following year. A bridge connected each unit's PC-SIDPERS database with its respective Center Level Application System (CLAS, pronounced "class") database. CLAS, also built in PC-FOCUS, was the successor to ULAS, and offered extensive additional data categories beyond that centrally maintained by RC-SIDPERS, including training data, weapon serial number assignment, protective mask tag number assignment, OER/NCOER rating chain, inter alia.

== Platform ==
SIDPERS had two basic platform flavors in the mid 1980s and through most of the 1990s. The first was a standalone TACCS (Tactical Army Combat Computer System) and the second was a sort of mainframe/dumb terminal flavor. Generally, TDA units received the "dumb terminal" version, since they did not generally deploy) and TO&E units received the deployable "TACCS boxes" as they were referred to. As late as 1993, the Army commands at some TDA locations were still using punch cards to run their daily reports. Installation MILPO's held local commands to a strict code of accuracy. Both MILPO and unit level SIDPERS clerks had to maintain accuracy percentages. Most installations required 95 percent Transaction accuracy percentages.

With the advent of SIPERS-3, the Army moved to using SCO UNIX servers in place of both TACCS and mainframes. The underlying database was INFORMIX. The SIDPERS-3 project was hailed as both a success and a failure. Primary reasons for rating the software poorly were related to the software's inability to improve accurate or processing speed. Primary reasons for citing the success of the software were related to the way the software developed, remaining mute on the subject of the ability of the software to successfully solve the problems it was intended to solve.

SIDPERS-3 was worked on from 1982 until 1994.

At its end, SIDPERS' platform was a Microsoft SQL Server database.

== Interfacing applications ==
Other applications that directly interfaced with the SIDPERS database:

- iPERMS

AITS Applications which include:

- MILPO Orders
- UPS/CMS
- MPDV II
- IDV Personnel
- SOH
- ETrans Manager
- OER Application
- NCOER Application
- 2-1 Application
- MILPO Admin

== Successors ==
SIDPERS' successor, Regional-Level Application System (RLAS, pronounced "are-lass"), is theoretically a Total-Army system, and essentially meshes with DEERS.

RLAS is, itself, one of more than seventy obsolete and redundant systems slated for replacement by the Defense Integrated Military Human Resources System (DIMHRS, pronounced "dime-hurz"), beginning in 2009. RLAS has been updated to RLAS8 due to DIMHRS being shelved. Various functions of it have been removed however, such as recording APFT and HT/WT Data. In 2022-2023, RLAS was largely replaced by IPPS-A
