= Lol Hammond =

- Origin: London, England
- Genres: Electronica, ambient
- Occupations: Musician, producer, DJ
- Instruments: Keyboards, mixer, synthesizer
- Years active: 1991–present
- Label: Big Chill Recordings

Lol Hammond (born 1965 in Stoke Newington, London) is an English musician, producer and DJ.

Hammond's career in electronic music started in the sound system Spiral Tribe in 1991. Simultaneously he created the production/remix act Drum Club together with London DJ Charlie Hall. Drum Club toured with Orbital in 1993 and released the studio albums Everything is Now and Drums Are Dangerous. In 1995, Hammond and Nina Walsh formed the Brithop group Slab. He has also remixed artists such as Killing Joke, The Fall, Lush, Republica, Brian Eno, Chapterhouse, Curve, Jah Wobble, experimental keyboardist Brian Graves, and Alabama 3.

Hammond released the 1998 album Thrilled By Velocity & Distortion with Matt Rowlands and vocalist Mandy Wall under the alias Girl Eats Boy.

Hammond has released records under his own name, most notably the album All This is Bliss in 2001, and together with Roger Eno the album Damage in 1999. Lol Hammond is interested in film and filmmaking and has worked as a music supervisor for several feature films. He has also had his music featured in movies such as The World Is Not Enough and It's All Gone Pete Tong. Hammond has also worked for the British music festival The Big Chill.

His Film Music Supervisor credits include: South West Nine, The Football Factory, It's All Gone Pete Tong, Sparkle, The Escapist, The Business, London to Brighton, Dirty Sanchez: The Movie, Heroes and Villains, Faintheart, Bronson, Pusher II, WAZ, The Children, Summer, The Firm, and Monsters.

He has recently worked on 3D dance movie StreetDance, writing and recording "Live for the Moment" with Pixie Lott for its soundtrack.
