= Ken Carter (stuntman) =

Canadian stunt driver (1938–1983)

- Born: Kenneth Gordon Poleschuk; 1938; Montreal, Quebec, Canada
- Died: September 5, 1983 (aged 44–45); Peterborough, Ontario, Canada
- Cause of death: Car crash
- Other name: The Mad Canadian

Kenneth Gordon Poleschuk (1938 – September 5, 1983), known professionally as Ken Carter, was a Canadian stunt driver.

== Early years ==
Carter was born in Montreal, Quebec and grew up in a working-class neighbourhood. With little education, he dropped out of school to perform car stunts with a team of travelling daredevils. Subsequently, he began performing as a solo act, and he jumped at racetracks all over North America. He became a notorious showman, nicknamed "The Mad Canadian" for his death-defying antics.

== St. Lawrence River jump ==
In 1976, after 20 years of car jumps, Carter launched his most ambitious project: an attempt to jump over the St Lawrence River—a distance of over 1 mile (1.6 km)—in a rocket-powered Lincoln Continental. The preparations for the jump were the subject of a documentary called The Devil at Your Heels, directed by Robert Fortier and produced by the National Film Board of Canada.

For months, Carter prepared his car and looked for sponsors. Eventually, U.S. broadcaster ABC gave him $250,000 ($1.41 million in 2025) to air the stunt on the episode of Wide World of Sports scheduled for September 25, 1976. Carter anticipated a live audience of 100,000. Construction of a 1,400-foot (430 m) takeoff ramp began on 50 acres (20 ha) of farmland near Morrisburg, Ontario. Evel Knievel visited the site as a special correspondent for ABC and concluded that there was little chance of success. Delays in finishing the car and completing the ramp caused Carter to miss the broadcast date and ABC withdrew its support.

Carter resumed preparations the following year and again in 1978, but the jump was cancelled both times. On September 26, 1979, Carter got to within five seconds of takeoff before aborting the jump following a mechanical failure. The planned jump had been sponsored by a film producer in exchange for exclusive film rights. Believing that Carter had lost his nerve, the film crew secretly arranged for another stunt driver, American Kenny Powers, to perform the jump while Carter was in his hotel room in Ottawa, Ontario. The Powers jump was a failure, with the car travelling only 506 feet (154 m) in the air and breaking apart in flight before crash-landing in the water. Powers broke eight vertebrae, three ribs, and a wrist. Interviewed after the jump, Carter said that Powers was unprepared to do the jump and could have been killed.

According to The Devil at Your Heels, Powers was chosen to do the jump at the last minute due to health concerns about Carter. Powers and Donna Boyle Powers Ray also verified this story to Beverly Plumley Powers. Carter still wanted to do the jump. Powers carried an 8-by-10-inch (20 by 25 cm) photograph of Carter in a portfolio at all times; the two were friends until Carter's death.

== Peterborough jump and death ==
Carter returned to stunt driving and on July 1, 1983, attempted to jump a pond in Peterborough, Ontario. The jump failed when the car began to fishtail on the runway and ramp, which ultimately put him in the water. Carter vowed to try the jump again and on September 5, 1983, made another attempt. His car, a 1982 Pontiac Firebird bodied car fitted with a homemade rocket, overshot its target landing ramp and landed on its roof. Carter was killed instantly. He is buried in Montreal.

== Legacy ==
A 2016 musical docudrama by John Bolton, Aim for the Roses, documents an album created by Mark Haney that was inspired by Ken Carter. It includes scenes from The Devil at Your Heels, and also shows footage from events after the St. Lawrence jump including Carter's fatal crash at Peterborough.

The 2026 film The Stunt Driver is a comedy film about Carter's exploits directed by Michael Dowse and starring Jay Baruchel as Carter. The film premiered at the 2026 Toronto International Film Festival, and was released in theaters on September 25, 2026.
