= The Foundation (Canadian TV series) =

Canadian television sitcom

The Foundation is a Canadian television sitcom that aired on Showcase in 2009.

Created and produced by Michael Dowse, the show stars Mike Wilmot as Michael Valmont-Selkirk, the crooked and corrupt director of a philanthropic foundation. The cast also includes Martin Sims, Rebecca Northan, Yvan Ponton, Paul Spence, Michael Sinelnikoff and Martha Burns.

The series premiered September 13, 2009.
