= FUBAR 2 =

- Film poster
- Directed by: Michael Dowse
- Written by: Michael Dowse; David Lawrence; Paul Spence
- Produced by: George Baptist; Michael Dowse; David Lawrence; Paul Spence; Shirley Vercruysse; Jennifer Wilson
- Starring: David Lawrence; Paul Spence
- Cinematography: Bobby Shore
- Edited by: Reginald Harkema
- Distributed by: Alliance Films
- Release dates: September 10, 2010 (TIFF); October 1, 2010
- Country: Canada
- Language: English

FUBAR 2 (also known as FUBAR: Balls to the Wall or FUBAR: Gods of Blunder) is a 2010 Canadian comedy film produced, co-written, and directed by Michael Dowse. It is the sequel to the 2002 cult film FUBAR. It made its world premiere by opening the Midnight Madness program at the Toronto International Film Festival. It was released on October 1, 2010.

== Plot ==
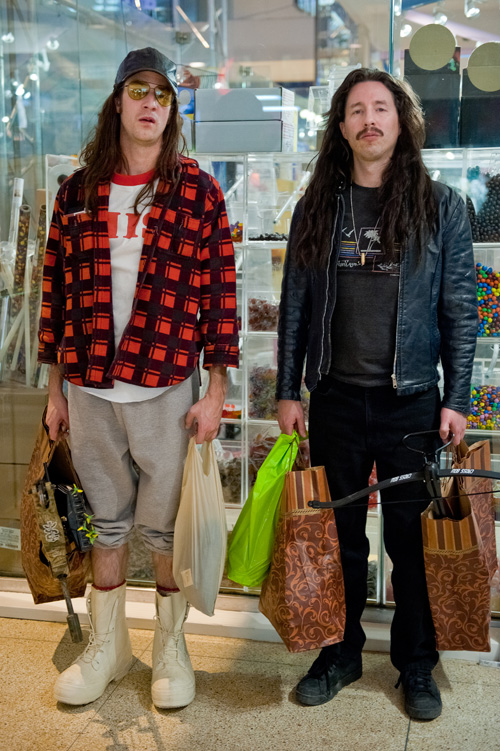
Terry and Dean

In Calgary, Terry (David Lawrence) and Dean (Paul Spence) are tired of barely scraping by on menial jobs. Recently evicted from their rented house, they are out of options until their old buddy and "party leader", Troy (better known as Tron) (Andrew Sparacino) gets them high-paying jobs laying oil pipeline in Fort McMurray.

While Terry quickly becomes a welcome member of the pipeline crew, Dean cannot take the pace of work and decides to injure himself for the Workers’ compensation money with Tron's help, however he quickly finds that the money offered is much less than he desired. Flush with money and confidence, Terry starts dating Trish (Terra Hazelton), a waitress at the local strip bar who has slept with every member of the pipeline crew at one time or another. When Terry quickly moves in with Trish, Dean does his best to save his friend from fading into a domestic lifestyle.

When layoffs hit the pipeline crew, Terry's fast-spending lifestyle quickly catches up with him, putting heavy strain on his relationship with Trish, who soon reveals she is pregnant. This only makes things worse, as it was revealed that Terry is infertile, meaning that the father is likely Dean, who had drunkenly slept with Trish while on a trip to the West Edmonton Mall. Meanwhile, Dean's latest medical checkup for his Workers' compensation claim reveals that his cancer has returned in more aggressive form, due to his heavy drinking and failure to attend a single follow-up treatment over the past five years. Terry, upset that Dean had vandalized his new truck and defecated in his dryer while drunk, ends their friendship, adding insult to injury. Dean reveals his condition only to Tron, who since being laid off has developed a serious crack habit. Each despondent for his own reason, Dean and Tron form a suicide pact, planning to end their lives the day after Christmas.

As Christmas fast approaches, Terry finds out from another member of the pipeline crew that Dean has lost his other testicle due to cancer. Terry rethinks his decision and goes to pick Dean up from a Hobo colony, where he has been living out of his car. Terry welcomes Dean into his home for Christmas. On Christmas Eve, Dean's family arrives, attempting to show him there are things worth living for. While singing karaoke, Dean discovers that his complete lack of testicles has allowed him to sing higher notes than ever before however, and decides not to commit suicide. However, after the group has gone to sleep, Tron shows up at Terry's house, intent on fulfilling the pact. Tron attempts to smother Dean with a pillow, but Dean fights back and ends up in a scuffle with Tron, in which Tron soils himself. Dean's daughter Chastity is awakened by the whole ordeal, and walks into the living room finding Tron dressed in a red suit and a Santa hat. Believing him to be Santa, she gives Tron a hug.

The film ends with Dean performing as the wedding singer for Terry and Trish. The two leave the reception and are showered by friends and family, including Tron, who also decided not to commit suicide. The film ends with a family photo of Terry, Dean, Trish and the new baby, who bears a striking resemblance to Dean.

== Cast ==
- David Lawrence as Terry Cahill
- Paul Spence as Dean Murdoch
- Andrew Sparacino as Troy (Tron) McRae
- Terra Hazelton as Trish
- Dr. S.C. Lim as Dr. S.C. Lim
- Tracey Lawrence as Trixie Anderson

== Production ==
Filming began in November 2009. Early plot ideas regarding Terry and Dean trying to conquer Hollywood were scrapped, in favour of the Fort McMurray storyline. Once again the dialogue was heavily improvised, and the budget was "a lot more" than the first film, according to Dowse.

== Awards ==
Spence received a Vancouver Film Critics Circle nomination for Best Actor in a Canadian Film at the Vancouver Film Critics Circle Awards 2010.

The film received three Genie Award nominations at the 31st Genie Awards in 2011, for Best Supporting Actress (Hazelton), Best Art Direction/Production Design (Myron Hyrak) and Best Original Song (Spence for "There's No Place Like Christmas").
