= Black Rock (band) =

Black Rock is a dance production duo from France, consisting of DJ/remixers, André Schmid and Dimitri Derisiotis.

In 2005, the duo scored one of their biggest dance hits with the song, "Blue Water". The track, also featured in the 2004 film It's All Gone Pete Tong, made the Top 20 on Billboard's Hot Dance Airplay and Hot Dance Club Play charts, featured Debra Andrew-Cowen on vocals. It also reached #36 in the UK Singles Chart in May 2005 and #76 on the Australian ARIA Charts in September 2005.
