= Defense Integrated Military Human Resources System =

The Defense Integrated Military Human Resources System was an enterprise program of the Business Transformation Agency's Defense Business Systems Acquisition Executive, within the United States Department of Defense (DoD). As the largest enterprise resource planning program ever implemented for human resources, DIMHRS (pronounced dime-ers) was to subsume or replace over 90 legacy systems. The first phase of DIMHRS was expected to roll out first to the U.S. Army in 2009 and bring all payroll and personnel functions for the Army into one integrated web-based system. The U.S. Air Force, United States Navy and the Marines were expected to roll out in that order after the Army had implemented it. On January 16, 2009, the Deputy Secretary of Defense issued a memorandum directing the Military Departments (MILDEPS) and the Defense Finance Accounting Service (DFAS), to confirm the "core" enterprise requirements of the capability at that time. Once, confirmed, the BTA was to transition the solution to the individual MILDEPS to build out and deploy their own required personnel and pay solutions using the "core" to the maximum extent possible..(Memorandum, Deputy Secretary of Defense, January 16, 2009, Subject: Acquisition Decision Memorandum for the Defense Integrated Military Human Resources System). The solution was transitioned to the MILDEPS on September 30, 2009. After numerous delays, technical problems, and other issues, in February 2010, the DoD completed the transition of the program, after 11 years and $850 million. (DoD: Integrated pay system is not total loss, 15 March 2010, Air Force Times)

== Background ==
"In late 1995, the Under Secretary of Defense for Personnel and Readiness, the USD Comptroller, and the Assistant Secretary of Defense Command, Control, Communications, and Intelligence asked the USD for Acquisition and Technology to convene a Defense Science Board Task Force on Military Personnel Information Management to advise the Secretary of Defense on the best strategy for supporting military personnel and pay functions. In a report published in August 1996, the Task Force concluded that the Department of Defense’s (DoD) multiple Service-unique military personnel and pay systems caused significant functional shortcomings (particularly in the joint arena) and excessive development and maintenance costs. Their central recommendation was that," “...the DoD should move to a single all-Service and all-component, fully integrated personnel and pay system, with common core software...”.

Development and Integration efforts began in September 2003 when DoD awarded Northrop Grumman a $281 million contract. In September 2005, An Office of the Secretary of Defense review of the program found the validated the objectives of the program and found the DIMHRS system to be a viable solution to meet these objectives with additional development and supported by a restructuring of the program acquisition. In October 2005, the DoD's newly formed Business Transformation Agency acquired responsibility for DIMHRS as well as 17 other DoD business system programs.

== What Service Members Could Have Expected from DIMHRS ==
DIMHRS was being designed to provide more accurate and timely pay. In DIMHRS, personnel changes would automatically update pay information in a single integrated system. Rather than separate systems performing two functions (as is currently the case for all services except the Marine Corps), a personnel change would trigger a series of automatic payroll changes based on the rules of each Service. DIMHRS would also provide more self-service features to monitor and take control of the Service member's own human resource information. Service members would be able to update information, record direct deposit choices and request other personnel and pay actions directly online via the Internet rather than having to go stand in line at the personnel office on their local base.

== Key Features of DIMHRS ==
There were four key features that DIMHRS was supposed to bring to military human resource management:

One Record of Service: For each Service member in the Army, Air Force, Navy and Marine Corps to have one record in DIMHRS that would follow them should they change services or components of Service throughout their career. This feature was to make it easier to move from one Service to another, and for a seamless transition for Reserve personnel and National Guard members to move to active duty. Currently only the Marine Corps has a system with this capability via the MCTFS.

Integrated System: Once a Service member is moved to active duty, the personnel data and payroll data would have been integrated, so with a status change, the Service member would have been given the benefits and pay that they should have. Currently the Marine Corps is the only service with this capability via the MCTFS.

Self-Service: The self-service functionality within DIMHRS would have enabled a Service member to view and update his/her record of service. Each member would have been able to view and update their designated personal information without assistance from a personnel/pay specialist. Self-service items that were set to be available through DIMHRS would have been categorized as being either personnel or pay related.

Joint System Helps Joint Commands: Leadership would have had real-time information to track troops regardless of location or Service branch. A joint system would have given the DoD more ability to deploy resources where they were most needed because they would have been working with real-time information.

== Issues and cancellation ==
DIMHRS was being developed through the use of a commercial-off-the-shelf (or COTS) based enterprise system. The DoD procured PeopleSoft as the COTS solution to provide the basic database software for DIMHRS. The DIMHRS Enterprise Program Management Office (EPMO) under the oversight and direction of the Business Transformation Agency (BTA) will oversee the developer implementor, Northrop Grumman Information Technology, through the key phases of the DIMHRS lifecycle, to include: design and build, system development and demonstration, developmental test and evaluation, operational test and evaluation, fielding decision, deployment and training. EPMO will work closely with the Office of the Under Secretary of Defense for Personnel and Readiness, the Services, Defense Manpower and Data Center (DMDC) and Defense Finance and Accounting Service (DFAS) representatives regarding data and deployment information, as well as coordinate program operations, cost, business, integrated logistics support, system engineering, testing and training. The deployment schedule will be solidified once Northrop Grumman provides the program's implementation plan. Under the current roll out strategy, the Army is the first to implement DIMHRS, followed by the Air Force, Navy and Marines. Once fully implemented, DIMHRS will provide a comprehensive, integrated military personnel and pay system to all Services and their Components within DoD.

In September 2008 the General Accounting Office (GAO) released a report identifying concerns by the Army that DIMHRS may not meet their requirements and outlining problems with its design and implementation. DoD planned for the Army to deploy DIMHRS and has postponed deployment four times with deployment then scheduled for March 2009. Several problems were encountered during the development process. 1. The conversion of Army data into DIMHRS (PeopleSoft) fields - Years of "home-grown" systems built up a myriad of data elements that in many cases did not match similar fields in different systems. The problem was further compounded when data updates fell out of sync due to this exact problem. 2. The failure of properly documenting program specifications. - Fault for this lies on everyone involved in the program with the Army's incredibly intricate processes being generalize too much and the contractor unable or unwilling to make changes to the overall PeopleSoft platform. 3. The requirement to keep the "PeopleSoft" backend system as unchanged as possible. - This began a struggle of trying to make the system conform to normal military business processes and military business processes modified to meet a commercial application's built-in procedures. Simple concepts, such as personnel movement became a challenge to replicate using PeopleSoft built-in procedures. A comment during a meeting from NGIT developers, "you guys (Army SMEs) just don't know how to properly manage people..." 4. DoD lack of efficient requirements communication to the Army. - Although DoD has taken steps to improve its communication of DIMHRS requirements to the Army, the Army continued to have concerns, including a lack of (1) assurance that Army requirements are covered in DIMHRS and (2) timely access to summary information on system requirements changes. Without effective communication, the Army has difficulty performing the gap analyses needed to determine which business processes to develop or adjust as it prepares for deployment of DIMHRS. If the Army does not have system information in time to adjust its business processes, the Army may not be prepared to deploy the system or may deploy it prematurely, which could affect servicemembers’ pay. DOD's efforts to improve its communications with the Army regarding the DIMHRS program's system capabilities does not include clearly defining and documenting a process that maintains effective communications of the differences between DIMHRS's capabilities and Army requirements. DOD has committed the Army to deploy DIMHRS in March 2009 as a result of postponing its October 2008 date. However, without DOD establishing a clearly defined process for maintaining effective, timely communications, the Army may not be prepared to deploy the system when scheduled, and DOD may deliver a system that will require extensive and expensive investments. In a recent development, announced 25 Nov 2008, the IOC date of 1 Mar 2009 has been officially rescinded. No new IOC date has been announced.

As of May 2009 the determination from the Department of Defense is that DIMHRS will no longer be implemented as a total force capability. At that time the Army and Air Force were still working over possible use of the system in the future, but the DOD (Department of Defense) announced that the Navy and the Marine Corps will not be required to implement it.

The Army DIMHRS project was eventually shelved as the Army moved on to the Integrated Personnel and Pay System - Army (IPPS-A) using the transitioned solution to handle many of the personnel management programs that were slated for management under DIMHRS.

In February 2010 Secretary of Defense Robert Gates and Chairman of the Joint Chiefs of Staff Michael Mullen announced the cancellation of the program following successful transition of the technical solution to each of the MILDEPS. Said Mullen, "This program has been a disaster." Added Gates, "Many of the programs that I have made decisions to cut have been controversial within the Department of Defense. This one was not. I would say that what we've gotten for a half billion dollars is an unpronounceable acronym."

== List of systems that were to be replaced by DIMHRS ==
Over 100 systems across DOD had been scheduled to be replaced with the implementation of DIMHRS. This table represents the systems that would have been subsumed by DIMHRS if it had been fully implemented.

System name	System name abbreviation	Service	Purpose	Notes
Defense Civilian Intelligence Personnel System	DCIPS	Joint	the human resources management system for the Department of Defense (DoD) intelligence components and other intelligence positions as designated by the Under Secretary of Defense for Intelligence.	DIMHRS will not replace all functionality
Marine Corps Total Force System	MCTFS	Marine Corps	Pay and personnel system	DIMHRS will not replace all functionality; MCTFS is currently the only integrated pay and personnel system within the United States Department of Defense

== See also ==
- Human resources information systems
