= Lewis & Clark: Great Journey West =

- Narrated by: Jeff Bridges
- Country of origin: United States

Production
- Running time: 40 minutes

Lewis & Clark: Great Journey West is a 40-minute documentary film released by National Geographic, produced by "Simon and Goodman Picture Company", recapping the Lewis and Clark Expedition. It was first released in theaters across the country on May 1, 2002 and was last shown in theaters May 28, 2007, before being released on VHS and DVD.

Actors recreate the experiences of Meriwether Lewis (Kelly Boulware), William Clark (Sonny Surowiec) and Sacagawea (Alex Rice) on the "Corps of Discovery Expedition" (1804–1806) as they make the first crossing of what would later become the United States. The film is narrated by Jeff Bridges.
