= Officer Qualification Record =

The Officer Qualification Record (OQR), NAVMC 123a, is one of the best sources of information concerning US Marine officers. It is similar to the enlisted Service Record Book (SRB) with only minor differences. This "record presents a cumulative and concise summary of basic events in the officer's career from the time of acceptance of appointment to separation. The OQR also serves as the basis for reporting information into the Marine Corps Total Force System and provides commanders with background information to assist them in officer personnel planning and assignment."

An officer's OQR contains, at a minimum, his NAVMC 763 Appointment Acceptance, (essentially their acceptance of the commission), NAVMC 118(3) (Chronological Record), NAVMC 118(11) (Administrative Remarks), Record of Emergency Data (RED), and Servicemembers Group Life Insurance (SGLI) Beneficiary Election Form. In addition to this, if the officer is a "mustang" (prior enlisted), their enlistment contract(s), and DD Form 214. A NAVMC 10922 (Dependency Affidavit) is also included for married officers.

== Standard Side of the SRB/OQR ==
The documents located on the right hand side of the folder are in every record and can serve as a basis for comparison. A standard page may consist of more than one page and is often identified by its NAVMC form number rather than its title or actual position in the sequence.

=== DD Form 4 enlistment/reenlistment contract ===
The first standard page is the basic agreement which establishes the legal relationship between the servicemember and the United States government. An officer will have an Appointment Acceptance and Record page (NAVMC 763) in place of an enlistment contract. This document represents the legal relationship between an officer and the Government.

=== NAVMC 118 (3) ===
The Chronological record page is a historical record of a servicemember's career listing all significant billets held and all units with whom they served. Periods of TAD as well as nonduty (UA, confinement, and hospitalization) will be reflected. Proceed, travel and leave are not recorded.

=== Record of service ===
This page is a printout of the manpower management data base and lists all sets of proficiency and conduct marks that a Marine received while serving in the rank of corporal or below. The computer will figure and present the average marks in service and the average marks in grade. On this page you will also find a Marine's current composite score, which is used in calculating a Marine's eligibility for each promotion through the grade of sergeant. Officers/sergeants and above are not given pro/con marks, therefore this is not a standard page in an OQR. This recommendation is a portion of your participation in the enlisted promotion process. Guidelines from the IRAM are provided in Appendix A.

=== NAVMC 118 (8a) ===
The Military and civilian occupational specialties page is used in both SRBs and OQRs. In addition to specialties a Marine's education, both civil and military, is recorded here. The civilian education portion is not updated after initial entry. The page was automated and moved to the document side. All changes are now done electronically in the Marine Corps Total Force System (MCTFS).

=== NAVMC 118 (9) ===
The Combat history, expeditions and awards page (page nine) is used to record this important information in both SRBs and OQRs. This page was automated for the Marine Corps and moved to the document side of the SRB/OQR. All changes to the page 9 are now done through Unit Diary transactions into the Marine Corps Total Force System(MCTFS).

=== NAVMC 118 (11) ===
The Administrative remarks page is used in both SRBs and OQRs. The overall intent is to record any matter forming an essential and permanent part of a Marine's military history which is not recorded elsewhere in the SRB or OQR. There are more than thirty specific entries which can be made. Use the guidance offered in the IRAM for when and how entries must be made, especially when recording the results of a counseling session or a negative recommendation for promotion or reenlistment.

=== NAVMC 118 (12) ===
The Offenses and punishment page is used in both records to record VA, declaration of desertion, the results of non-judicial punishment (NJP) and to record good conduct, selected marine corps reserve (SMCR), and armed forces reserve medal periods. Officers will not have NAVMC 118 (12) in the field OQR.

Record of conviction by court-martial (NAVMC 118 (13)). This page is used in both records to record this information. If a Marine has never been convicted at a court martial he will not have a page thirteen.

Record of emergency data (RED). This page is next in both records. It contains the most current information on a Marine's next-of-kin and any insurance companies that the Marine wishes to have notified in the event of death or serious injury.

=== Serviceman's group life insurance election document ===
This page follows the RED, and it must always be kept up-to-date because it designates to whom this insurance will be awarded in the event of the Marine's death. Permanent record of enlisted flight time (OPNAV form 1326/2). This page is maintained as the last document on the standard pages side of an SRB for those Marines who have performed duty as naval aircrewmen.

Document Side of the SRB/OQR. This half of the record is reserved for inserting superseded standard pages, official letters, certificates, and various other documents. The IRAM lists more than fifty examples of documents which may be filed on this side of the record. Any document placed here must be of permanent value. The order in which they will be placed will be determined by the local command.

The commanding officer's copy(s) of a Marine's leave and earnings statement (LES) will normally be kept as the first document(s) on this side. These will be retained until the annual LES verification is completed; this takes place during the month which coincides with the last digit of a Marine's social security number. Until a period of leave or delay is reflected on a Marine's LES, a copy of the orders which authorized the leave period will be retained here.

=== Basic training record (BTR) ===
For the Marine Corps this is a computer generated printout of the Marine Corps Total Force System(MCTFS). The local admin section produces the record using the on-line diary system. The printout is now a permanent part of the SRB/OQR and should be updated at least once a year. The BTR contains the following information on a Marine:

- Date and score of the last PFT
- Rifle, pistol and swim qualifications
- Dates of the last drug and annual security lectures
- Assignment to weight control and military appearance programs
- Service school attendance
- Test scores such as the GCT and ASVAB

=== Basic individual record (BIR) ===
This document is also computer generated printout of the Marine Corps Total Force System(MCTFS). organized in the following manner:

- Contract information which includes EAS, EOS, ECC and extensions in effect
- Service information such as grade, date of rank, MOS and deployment status
- Personal/military information including decorations, duty preference codes, home of record, religion, race, and citizenship
- Dependent information including marital status, BAQ, location, and number

State and federal tax filing forms such as the IRS W-4 form will be located on the document side along with a State of Legal Residence Certificate.

=== NAVMC 10922 ===
The dependency application form, located on the document side, certifies a servicemembers right to Basic Allowance for Housing at the "with dependents rate."

=== DD Form 1172 ===
An Application for uniformed services ID card-DEERS enrollment, when completed, certified, and keyed into the unit diary system will enter a Marine's dependents on the DEERS program. Failure to enroll one's dependents in DEERS can result in the denial of medical or other benefits. Marines may also enroll their families in the dependents dental plan with DD form 2494.

=== NAVMC 11051 ===
Assignment to government quarters, is completed when a Marine accepts government quarters in lieu of BAQ.

Official letters authorizing alternate body weight standards must be filed on the document side of the record. It is essential for Marines granted a waiver to have this letter as part of their permanent record. Failure could result in lost promotions or duty assignments for the Marine concerned.

=== DD Form 1561 ===
Statement to substantiate payment of family separation allowance, when completed and filed in a service members record entitles them to FSA. The form must be completed every time a service member is deployed for thirty or more consecutive days.

As part of their record, dual service parents and single parents must file a special power of attorney on the document side of their OQR/SRB. This special power of attorney will detail the Marine's care plans for minor children in the event of deployment.

When a Marine is given special authority for reenlistment or extension of enlistment or when awarded a remedial promotion, the appropriate documentation must be retained on the document side of the SRB. A career planning contact record should be filed on the document side of the SRB of first term Marines to document counseling with the command's career planner.

For Marines who work with classified material a number of important documents may be retained. These include the record of personnel reliability program (PRP), the PRP screening and evaluation record, security termination statements, national agency check requests, requests for personnel security investigations, and personal history statements.

Punitive and non-punitive letters of reprimand as well as page 11 entry rebuttals will be filed near the end of the document side.

As the last document retained, there will be a record of disclosure, OPNAV FORM 5511/14, to record to whom and on what date information from the record has been released Summary. This handout has examined the most common and useful personnel records available in the Marine Corps. Take care of your Marines and yourself by ensuring their accuracy and completeness at all times.

== See also ==
- Defense Department Form 214
