= Official Military Personnel File =

U.S. military service record

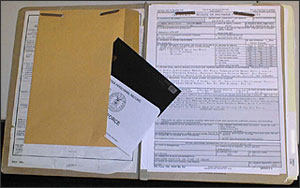
Typical Air Force OMPF from the late 20th century

The Official Military Personnel File (OMPF), known as a 201 File in the U.S. Army, is an Armed Forces administrative record containing information about a service member's history, such as:

- Promotion Orders
- Mobilization Orders
- DA1059s – Service School Academic Evaluation Reports
- MOS Orders
- Awards and decorations
- Transcripts
- SGLV 8286 – Servicemembers’ Group Life Insurance Election and Certificate)
- NCOERs and OERs (Evaluation Documents)
- DD Form 214 Certificate of Release or Discharge from Active Duty

== Contents ==
The OMPF is an important document for service members to maintain, as the documents it contains are important for access to benefits such as the VA loan and the G.I. Bill. Copies may be requested from the National Archives by service members and their families. The OMPF further contains demotions, forfeiture of pay as a de facto record of non-judicial disciplinary action (Article 15). Court Martial and judicial action are recorded. Weapons qualification is included in the OMPF.

== Other uses ==
The Central Intelligence Agency (CIA) also uses the term "201 file" to refer to their employees' personnel records used for analogous purposes.
