= Doctor*Ology =

Doctor*Ology is a documentary television series which premiered its first five episodes on March 2, 2007 on the Discovery Channel. It is a comedic documentary, starring actor David Lawrence as the narrator Robert and Leslie Nielsen as his goofy uncle. The series describes the type of work done in various medical specialties.

== Episodes ==
- Episode 1: Traumatology. Original air date: Fri, March 2, 2007 at 8:30 PM (ET)/9 PM (PT)
- Episode 2: Cardiology. Original air date: Fri, March 2, 2007 at 9:00 PM (ET)/9:00 PM (PT)
- Episode 3: Neurology. Original air date: Fri, March 2, 2007 at 9:30 PM (ET)/10 PM (PT)
- Episode 4: Anesthesiology. Original air date: Fri, March 2, 2007 at 10:00 PM (ET)/10:30 PM (PT)
- Episode 5: Urology/Gynecology. Original air date: Fri, March 2, 2007 at 10:30 PM (ET)/11 PM (PT)
- Episode 6: Ophthalmology. Original air date: Fri, March 9, 2007 at 8:30 PM (ET)/5:30 PM (PT)
- Episode 7: Immunology. Original air date: Fri, March 16, 2007 at 8:30 PM (ET)/5:30 PM (PT)
- Episode 8: Dermatology. Original air date: Fri, March 23, 2007 at 8:30 PM (ET)/5:30 PM (PT)
- Episode 9: Hematology. Original air date: Fri, March 30, 2007 at 8:30 PM (ET)/5:30 PM (PT)
- Episode 10: Gastroenterology. Original air date: Fri, April 6, 2007 at 8:30 PM (ET)/5:30 PM (PT)
- Episode 11: Hepatology. Original air date: Fri, April 13, 2007 at 8:30 PM (ET)/5:30 PM (PT)
- Episode 12: Otolaryngology. Original air date: Fri, April 20, 2007 at 8:30 PM (ET)/5:30 PM (PT)
- Episode 13: Pulmonology. Original air date: Fri, April 27, 2007 at 8:30 PM (ET)/5:30 PM (PT)

== Reception ==
Ahead of the series debut on the Discovery Health channel, Entertainment Weekly expressed apprehension over the fact that comedian Leslie Nielsen was hosting a show about serious medical issues. Describing it as "a peppy mockumentary", Alex Strachan wrote in The Leader-Post that "the result is a little like Scrubs crossed with It's Your Health".
