= Terra Hazelton =

Canadian jazz musician, broadcaster and actress

Terra Hazelton is a Canadian jazz musician, broadcaster and actress.

Raised in Calgary, Hazelton began studying theatre with the Loose Moose Theatre Company as a teenager. She later moved to Toronto to pursue opportunities in theatre, discovering her skills as a musician when she was asked to write a comedic song for an improv show. She has since released two solo albums as a jazz singer, as well as appearing on Jeff Healey's 2006 album It's Tight Like That. She performs regularly at Toronto jazz clubs and has performed at various jazz festivals across Canada, and also formerly hosted Timeless, a program on Toronto's jazz radio station CJRT-FM devoted to early 20th century jazz recordings.

As an actor, she made her first film appearance in the 2010 film FUBAR 2. She garnered a Genie Award nomination for Best Supporting Actress at the 31st Genie Awards.

== Discography ==
- Anybody's Baby (HealeyOphonic, 2004)
- Gimme Whatcha Got (2009)

== Filmography ==
- Anybody's Baby, 2008
- Fubar II, 2010
- Paranormal Witness, 2013
- Orphan Black, 2014
- Whatever, Linda, 2014
