= Loose Moose Theatre =

Loose Moose Theatre Company
- Company type: Not-for-profit arts organization
- Industry: Theatre|Comedy|Entertainment
- Founded: 1977 in Calgary, Canada
- Founder: Keith Johnstone and Mel Tonken
- Headquarters: Calgary, Canada
- Key people: Dennis Cahill (Artistic Director)
- Number of employees: 2+
- Website: http://www.loosemoose.com

The Loose Moose Theatre Company (LMTC), is a theater company based in Calgary, Alberta, Canada. It was co-founded in 1977, by Keith Johnstone and Mel Tonken. LMTC has an international reputation for developing the theatrical style of improvisation and specifically the work of Keith Johnstone. LMTC is the birthplace of such improvisation shows as Theatresports, Maestro, Gorilla Theatre, and Life Game.

== History ==
The Loose Moose is an active theatre company producing in house and touring, plus it offers a training centre for individuals interested in improvisational theatre. They have continued a long-standing tradition of producing a weekend-afternoon series of children's theatre, and an evening series of improvisational comedic theatre as well as various improvised based plays and special events such as the International Improvisation Summit in March 2010 and Improvisation marathons (the longest of which lasted 52 hours of sleepless improvisation). It also was an early adopter and supporter of gay content in the late 1970s to draw attention to social injustice.

Loose Moose has existed in a few venues since its inception. Originally in the Pumphouse theatre, Loose Moose moved to a space within an industrial complex in the northeast area of Calgary (near the airport). After space-use and lease negotiations with a neighbouring Christian academy failed to be resolved, LMTC took up in the historic Garry Theatre in the Inglewood district. In 2005, LMTC moved into a new performance space in the Calgary Crossroads Market.

From 1988-2019, the Loose Moose hosted the Loose Moose International Improvisation Summer School, a two-week school in the summer drawing people all over the world to Calgary, which was long recognized as a hub of narrative improvisation inspiration and education in the world.

Many LMTC alumni are now working in the areas of film, television, stage and still use their improvisational skills as a foundation for their work. Loose Moose alumni include Michael Rohl, Roman Danylo, Rebecca Northan, Albert Howell, Ryan Belleville, Tony Totino, Rick Hilton, Dave Duncan, Mark McKinney, Bruce McCulloch, Norm Hiscock, Veena Sood, Clem Martini, Patti Stiles, Derek Flores, Terra Hazelton, Eric Amber, Roger Fredericks, Jan Derbyshire, Roderick Crawford, Chris Cline, Frank Totino, Pat Kelly, Shawn Kinley, Bruce Horak, Peter Oldring, Dave Lawrence, Rob Mitchelson, Dave Ware, A.J. Demers, Renee Amber, Andrew Phung, Steve Jarand, Immanuela Lawrence, Graeme Davies and Jenny Wynter.

In 1998, Dennis Cahill became the Artistic Director of Loose Moose.
