= The Devil at Your Heels =

1981 documentary film by Robert Fortier

- Directed by: Robert Fortier
- Produced by: Bill Brind, Robert Fortier, Barrie Howells and Adam Symansky
- Starring: Ken Carter
- Narrated by: Gordon Pinsent
- Edited by: Robert Fortier and David Wilson
- Distributed by: Visionsmiths, Inc.
- Release date: 1981
- Running time: 103 minutes
- Country: Canada
- Language: English

The Devil at Your Heels is a 1981 documentary that chronicles the attempt of the stuntman and daredevil Ken Carter to jump a rocket-powered car over the Saint Lawrence River, a distance of one mile.

== Synopsis ==
The documentary opens with some quick framing of the task, including footage of the ramp and the car to be used for the jump, and then chronicles how Carter became a daredevil, including footage of some early jumps. It then follows the ups and downs he experienced in his five-year journey to jump the river. He has a series of financial and technical obstacles. Technical problems included difficulties with the car (the fuel tank kept blowing up) and the ramp he was planning to jump off (it was bumpy and not structurally sound). The financial problems were simpler; he kept running out of money and his backers were unhappy.

In the fifth year, everything was ready, but two attempts were called off — one because of a short strike by the ground crew, and one because of weather. The backers, desperate to finish, believed that Carter had lost his nerve and called him to a meeting in another city, and then brought in another driver, American Kenny Powers, to attempt the jump.

The bumps in the ramp had not been fixed, and as the car accelerated, it started to shake itself to pieces and fell apart in midair. The parachutes deployed and the car landed in shallow water. Powers survived with eight broken vertebrae (he later recovered fully). The effort to make the jump was abandoned.

== Notes ==
The film closes with Carter vowing to continue trying. However, a few years after the movie was made, the ramp was demolished, and then Carter was killed in 1983 in Peterborough, Ontario, while attempting another stunt.

The runway and ramp were built in a field west of Hanes Road and south of county road 2 in Morrisburg, Ontario, Canada. The ramp has been demolished, but as of 2020, the asphalt runway remains.

The title song was performed by the blues performer Long John Baldry.

Produced by the National Film Board of Canada, The Devil at Your Heels won the Genie Award for Best Theatrical Documentary.

On 16 October 1993, The Devil at Your Heels was screened on Australian television as part of a special hosted by the cast of the ABC comedy series The Late Show. The film was subsequently released on VHS in Australia under the title The Late Show Presents The Devil at Your Heels, with the introductory and closing Late Show material bookending the documentary.

A 2016 musical docudrama by John Bolton, Aim for the Roses, documents an album created by Mark Haney that was inspired by Ken Carter. It includes scenes from The Devil at Your Heels, and also shows footage from events after the St. Lawrence jump including Carter's fatal crash at Peterborough.

The podcast Heavyweight by Johnathan Goldstein references the movie several times in the episode "#13 Kenny".
