= FUBAR (film) =

2002 Canadian comedy film by Michael Dowse

- Theatrical release poster
- Directed by: Michael Dowse
- Written by: Michael Dowse; Dave Lawrence; Paul Spence
- Produced by: Michael Dowse; Dave Lawrence; Paul Spence; Melanie Owen; Marguerite Pigott; Mark Slone
- Starring: Dave Lawrence; Paul Spence; Gordon Skilling
- Cinematography: Michael Dowse
- Music by: English Teeth; Paul J. Spence
- Distributed by: Odeon Films
- Release date: May 24, 2002
- Running time: 79 minutes
- Country: Canada
- Language: English
- Budget: Shooting budget $10,000 CAD Final budget $350,000 CAD

FUBAR is a 2002 Canadian comedy film directed by Michael Dowse and written by Dave Lawrence, Dowse and Paul Spence, following the lives of two lifelong friends and head-bangers, Terry Cahill and Dean Murdoch. It debuted at the Sundance Film Festival. Since its release, it has gained a cult status in North America, particularly in Western Canada.

Filmed and set in and around Calgary, Alberta, it was shot on a Canon XL1, on a shoestring budget; Lawrence maxed out his credit card, and his father refinanced their family home, to complete it.

The film features characters created by Lawrence and Paul Spence that they developed based on the head-banger subculture. Terry Cahill, one of the main characters, played by Lawrence, was based on a character he created at Loose Moose Theatre in the mid-'90s. Many people who appear in the movie (including the fist-fighters) were bystanders who thought that the filmmakers were shooting a documentary on the common man. FUBAR did not have a fully-written script, only a rough outline from which the actors improvised.

== Plot ==
FUBAR is the story of two lifelong friends, Terry Cahill (Dave Lawrence) and Dean Murdoch (Paul Spence), who have grown up together: shotgunning their first beers, forming their first garage band, and growing the great Canadian mullet known as "Hockey Hair". The lives of these Alberta everymen are brought to the big screen by documentarian Farrel Mitchner (Gordon Skilling), a young director who decides to take a look at Terry and Dean through a lens, exploring the depths of their friendship, the fragility of life, growing up gracefully, and the art and science of drinking beer "like a man".

Their lives are complicated when they’re snubbed by their "party leader" Troy, better known as Tron (Andrew Sparacino). When Farrel discovers that Dean is hiding a serious case of testicular cancer, the wheels are set in motion for Dean to seek treatment from Dr. S. C. Lim (who plays himself). With Dean's last weekend before surgery approaching, Terry decides to take Dean, Farrel and the film crew camping. Things take an unexpected turn by the third day, and Terry and Dean must cope with further tragedy.

== Cast ==
- Dave Lawrence as Terry Cahill
- Paul Spence as Dean Murdoch
- Gordon Skilling as Farrel Mitchner
- Tracey Lawrence as Trixie Anderson
- Rose Martin as Rose Murdoch
- Sage Lawrence as Chastity Murdoch
- Dr. S.C. Lim as Dr. S.C. Lim
- Jim Lawrence as Ron Miller
- Andrew Sparacino as Troy (Tron) McRae
- Laurie D'Amour as Laurie D'Amour
- Cameron Swirka as Fist Fighter #1
- Peter N. Cipriano as Fist Fighter #2

== Reception ==
FUBAR received mixed reviews. On Rotten Tomatoes, it has an approval rating of 55% based on reviews from 11 critics, with an average rating of 6.0/10.

Paul Dale of The List gave it 3 out of 5 and wrote: "The gloriously stupid levels of debauchery reached in this film will have a strange resonance for anyone who lived through the Thatcherite bedsit stinkfest that was pre-Acid House Britain." Kevin N. Laforest of the Montreal Film Journal compared the film to This is Spinal Tap "only with more pathetic protagonists – and funnier!" Empire gave it 2 out of 5.

In 2023, Barry Hertz of The Globe and Mail named the film one of the 23 best Canadian comedy films ever made.

== Soundtrack ==
A soundtrack album, FUBAR: The Album, was released in 2003. The album includes songs from The New Pornographers, Chixdiggit and Sloan.

== Sequel film ==
After the success of FUBAR, its sequel, FUBAR 2: Balls to the Wall, secured a $4-million budget based only on the scriptment marking the first time ever Telefilm Canada green lit a film without a complete script.

Filmed in Edmonton and Fort Saskatchewan, Alberta, the plot involves Terry and Dean moving to Fort McMurray to earn easy money in the oil patch. Similar to the first FUBAR film, the dialogue was improvised but the budget was significantly larger than the first film. The sequel was the first Canadian film to premier at the Midnight Madness slot at the 2010 Toronto International Film Festival on September 9, 2010. The film was released throughout Canada on October 1, 2010.

The sequel was well received. On Rotten Tomatoes, it has a 90% rating based on reviews from 10 critics.

== Television series ==
On February 10, 2017, Rogers Media and VICE Studios Canada announced an eight-episode television series, FUBAR: Age of Computer, that continued the legacy of the original FUBAR films. The series captured the experiences of Terry Cahill, played by Dave Lawrence, and Dean Murdoch, played by Paul Spence, exploring the internet for the first time. The show features real-life interactions with various experts and influencers online. FUBAR: Age of Computer was inspired by Dave Lawrence's character, Terry.

The series was filmed in Montreal, Quebec, and premiered on November 3, 2017, and aired on Viceland and CityTV

In 2022, TNT FUBAR was released and is aired through the streaming site Swearnet. This series showcases Terry Cahill, played by Dave Lawrence, as he is living back home in Calgary, Alberta. He is joined by his cousin Shank played by North Darling and his wife Trish, played by Terra Hazelton. The series shows Terry renting out Shank’s basement, his attempted divorce from his wife Trish and a misunderstanding with a multi-level marketing scheme that leads Terry to Bret Hart, played by Bret Hart.

== Mobile game ==
On January 8, 2020, Kano Applications Inc. announced the worldwide launch of new mobile game, Fubar: Just Give'r, developed in collaboration with East Side Games and BT Productions. This narrative clicker idle game available on iOS and Android picks up where the movies left off with all new storylines and exciting weekly events. Players will join the iconic FUBAR (film) duo, Terry and Deaner, and help them as they embark on a quest to beat the World Record for Longest Party Streak.
