= Michael Dowse =

Canadian director

- Dowse in 2026
- Born: April 19, 1973 (age 53); London, Ontario, Canada
- Occupation: Film director

Michael Dowse (born April 19, 1973) is a Canadian film director.

== Life and career ==
Born in London, Ontario, to Irish parents, he was trained as a film editor. His first full-length movie, FUBAR was shot on a digital camera with a tiny budget, but was selected by the Sundance Film Festival and screened on the prestigious midnight slot, which had launched the revolutionary film The Blair Witch Project. Though it failed to get picked up by any major American theatrical distributors, FUBAR subsequently became a cult hit in Canada. Following the success of FUBAR, Dowse went on to direct the higher-budget British film It's All Gone Pete Tong, the story of a deaf DJ in Ibiza.

Dowse's next production, the 1980s retro comedy Take Me Home Tonight, started shooting in Phoenix, Arizona on the week beginning 19 February 2007, and was released to theaters on March 4, 2011.

Dowse directed The F Word, starring Daniel Radcliffe, Zoe Kazan, and Adam Driver.

He has also directed Stuber, starring Dave Bautista, Kumail Nanjiani, and Iko Uwais. A film about an encounter between an Uber driver and an almost-blind cop.

In 2025, he began filming on The Stunt Driver, a historical fact-based film based on stuntman Ken Carter.

He currently resides in Montreal with his wife and children.

== Filmography ==
=== Film ===
Year	Title	Director	Writer	Producer	Notes
2002	FUBAR	Yes	Yes	Yes	Also cinematographer and editor
2004	It's All Gone Pete Tong	Yes	Yes	No	
2010	Fubar 2	Yes	Yes	Yes	Also known as FUBAR: Balls to the Wall or FUBAR: Gods of Blunder; Also editor
2011	Take Me Home Tonight	Yes	No	No	
2011	Goon	Yes	No	No	
2013	The F Word	Yes	No	Executive	Also released as What If?
2013	The Grand Seduction	No	Yes	No	
2019	Stuber	Yes	No	No	
2020	Coffee & Kareem	Yes	No	No	
2021	8-Bit Christmas	Yes	No	No	
2025	Trap House	Yes	No	No	
2026	The Stunt Driver	Yes	Yes	Yes	

=== Short films ===
Year	Title	Director	Writer
2000	237	Yes	Yes
2017	Robot Bullies	Yes	No

=== Television ===
Year	Title	Director	Writer	Producer	Creator	Notes
2009	The Foundation	Yes	Yes	Yes	Yes	Produced 1 episode
2016–2017	Man Seeking Woman	Yes	Yes	No	No	Directed 6 episodes; Produced 10 episodes
2017	Preacher	Yes	No	No	No	Episode "Puzzle Piece"
2017	Fubar Age of Computer	Yes	Yes	Executive	Yes	Also composed opening theme
2017	Future Man	Yes	No	No	No	Episodes "Prelude to an Apocalypse" and "A Date with Destiny"

=== Music videos ===
Year	Title	Artist
1998	"Chupacabras"	Chixdiggit
2000	"Slow Descent into Alcoholism"	The New Pornographers
2000	"Letter from an Occupant"	The New Pornographers
2003	"Your Daddy Don't Know"	The New Pornographers
2003	"The Kid Is Hot Tonight"	Chixdiggit
2003	"In the Mood"	Sloan
2003	"FUBAR Is a Super Rocker"	Thor
—N/a	"Diamond Head"	The New Pornographers

=== Other credits ===
Year	Title	Role
1999	Bad Money	Editor
2000	waydowntown	Assistant editor
2001	Mile Zero	Assistant editor
2002	Looking for Leonard	Editor
2009	You Might as Well Live	Executive producer

== Awards and nominations ==
Russell Peters awards and nominations
Awards and nominations
Award	Wins	Nominations
Totals
Canadian Screen Awards	0	3
Directors Guild of Canada Awards	0	3
Gen Art Film Festival Awards	2	2
Genie Awards	0	3
SXSW Film Festival Awards	0	1
Toronto Film Critics Association Awards	0	2
Toronto International Film Festival Awards	1	2
US Comedy Arts Festival Awards	1	1
Wins	4
Nominations	17

Year	Nominated work	Award	Category	Result
2003	FUBAR	Genie Awards	Best Achievement in Editing	Nominated
2004	It's All Gone Pete Tong	Toronto International Film Festival Awards	Best Canadian Film	Won
2005	It's All Gone Pete Tong	Gen Art Film Festival Awards	Audience Award - Best Feature	Won
2005	It's All Gone Pete Tong	Gen Art Film Festival Awards	Best Feature	Won
2005	It's All Gone Pete Tong	US Comedy Arts Festival Awards	Film Discovery Jury Award - Best Feature	Won
2006	It's All Gone Pete Tong	Genie Awards	Best Achievement in Direction	Nominated
2006	It's All Gone Pete Tong	Genie Awards	Best Original Screenplay	Nominated
2010	FUBAR 2	Toronto International Film Festival Awards	People's Choice Award: Midnight Madness	Nominated
2011	FUBAR 2	SXSW Film Festival Awards	Audience Award - Spotlight Premiere	Nominated
2012	Goon	Directors Guild of Canada Awards	Outstanding Directorial Achievement in a Feature Film	Nominated
2012	Goon	Toronto Film Critics Association Awards	Rogers Best Canadian Film Award	Nominated
2012	Goon	Canadian Screen Awards	Best Director	Nominated
2014	The Grand Seduction	Canadian Screen Awards	Best Adapted Screenplay	Nominated
2014	The F Word	Canadian Screen Awards	Best Director	Nominated
2014	The F Word	Directors Guild of Canada Awards	Best Direction in a Feature Film	Nominated
2014	The F Word	Directors Guild of Canada Awards	Best Feature Film	Nominated
2014	The F Word	Toronto Film Critics Association Awards	Rogers Best Canadian Film Award	Nominated
