= Integrated Personnel and Pay System - Army =

US Army human resources system

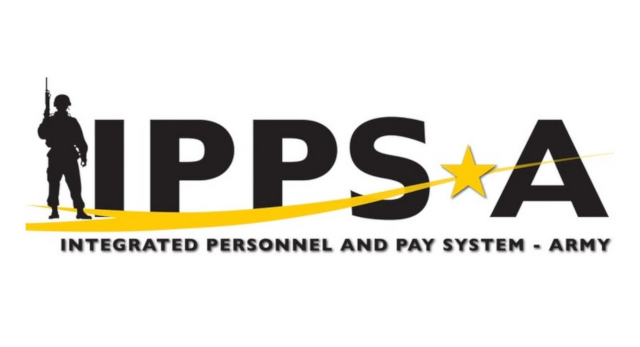
IPPS-A logo

The Integrated Personnel and Pay System - Army (IPPS-A) is a United States Army acquisition program that seeks to integrate human resources and pay for all Army soldiers. It provides online tools and replaces older human resource systems. It has successfully fielded to the Army National Guard and was scheduled to field to active and reserve components by December 2021; however, fielding was delayed due to issues importing data from existing personnel systems.

== Organization ==
The IPPS-A is a partnership between the Assistant Secretary of the Army for Acquisition, Logistics, and Technology and the Army G-1.

As part of the IPPS-A, the Army switched to a semimonthly payday for long-term active-duty soldiers.

== See also ==
- Defense Finance and Accounting Service
