= DD Form 214 =

Document for discharged US military personnel

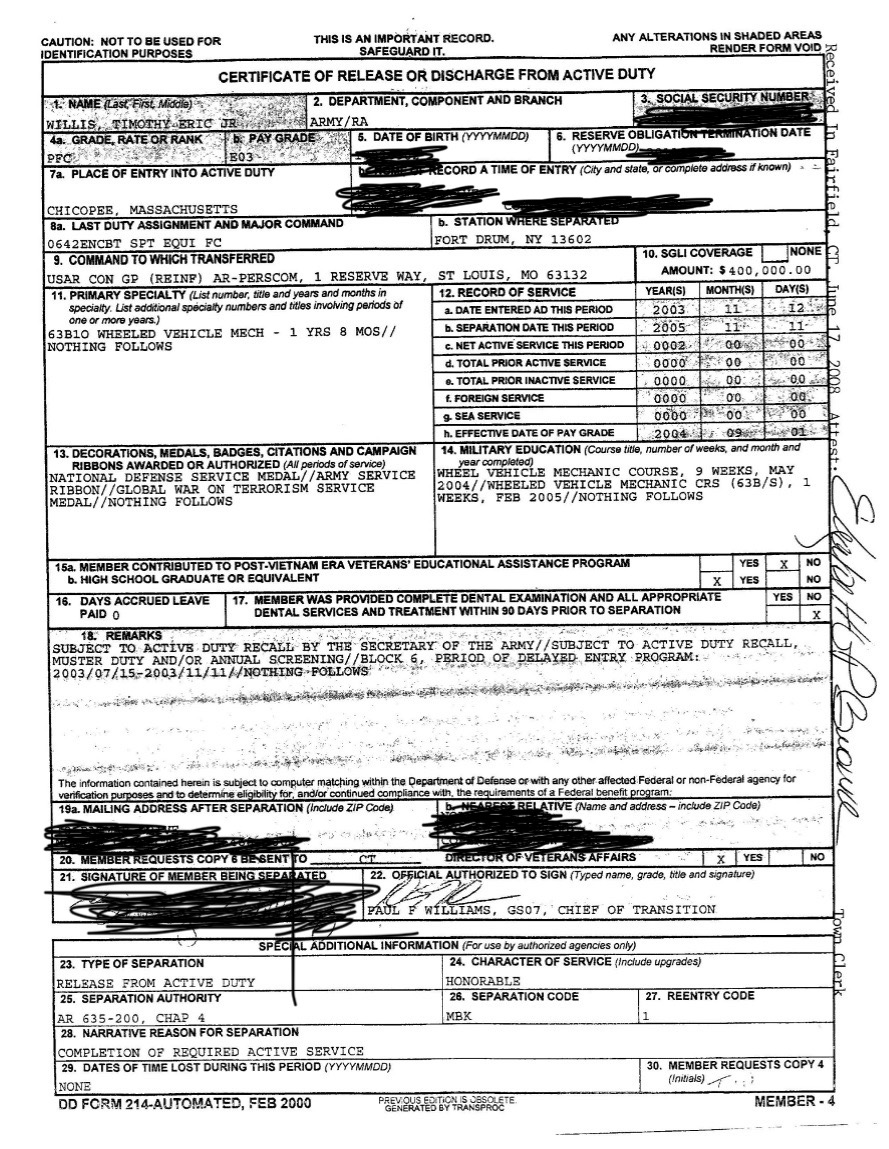
Sample DD214 for Timothy Eric Willis Jr (10th Mountain)

The DD Form 214, Certificate of Release or Discharge from Active Duty, generally referred to as a "DD 214", is a document of the United States Department of Defense, issued upon a military service member's retirement, separation, or discharge from active duty in the Armed Forces of the United States (i.e., U.S. Army, U.S. Navy, U.S. Marine Corps, U.S. Air Force, U.S. Space Force, U.S. Coast Guard).

== History ==
The DD Form 214 was introduced in 1950 following the standardization of military separation documents by the United States Department of Defense. It replaced several earlier discharge and separation forms used by the individual military branches, including the WD AGO series issued by the War Department and naval separation documents such as NAVPERS 553.

In earlier revisions, including the version issued on 1 November 1972, the document was titled Report of Separation from Active Duty. The current title, Certificate of Release or Discharge from Active Duty, was adopted on 1 July 1979.

== Usage ==
The DD Form 214 serves as the primary official record of a service member's separation from active duty military service. The form contains information including dates of service, military education and training, awards and decorations, duty assignments, overseas service, and separation status.

One of the most significant entries on the form is the characterization of service, such as Honorable, General (Under Honorable Conditions), Other Than Honorable, Bad Conduct, or Dishonorable discharge. Characterization of service may affect eligibility for veterans' benefits and employment preferences.

The form also documents military occupational qualifications, including Military Occupational Specialty (MOS), Air Force Specialty Code (AFSC), Navy Enlisted Classification (NEC), and related qualification identifiers.

DD Form 214 is commonly required to establish eligibility for benefits administered by the United States Department of Veterans Affairs, including education assistance, disability compensation, burial benefits, and home loan programs. Employers may also request the form to verify military service and determine eligibility for veterans' hiring preferences.

The document additionally includes Separation Program Designator (SPD) codes and Reenlistment Eligibility (RE) codes, which identify the reason for separation and determine eligibility for reenlistment.

Funeral directors frequently use DD Form 214 to verify eligibility for burial in a Department of Veterans Affairs national cemetery, military funeral honors, or government-issued grave markers.

Individuals who served exclusively in the Army National Guard or Air National Guard without activation into federal active duty service generally receive NGB Form 22 instead of DD Form 214.

Copies of DD Form 214 are typically maintained by the government as part of a service member's Official Military Personnel File (OMPF). The OMPF file generally contains additional personnel-related forms.

== Available versions ==
DD Form 214 is issued in both edited and unedited versions, commonly referred to as the "short form" and "long form", respectively. The edited version omits certain information, including characterization of service, separation authority, and reason for separation.

At separation from military service, service members may elect to receive either the edited Member 1 copy, the unedited Member 4 copy, or both. The unedited copy is generally required to establish eligibility for veterans' benefits, employment preferences, and reenlistment determinations.

Eight original copies of DD Form 214 are prepared and distributed to the service member and various governmental agencies. Copies distributed to agencies may include the Department of Veterans Affairs, the Department of Labor, and state veterans affairs agencies.

== Replacement copies ==
Veterans may request replacement copies of DD Form 214 through the National Personnel Records Center (NPRC), operated by the National Archives and Records Administration. Requests may be submitted online, by mail using Standard Form 180, or in person.

If an original DD Form 214 cannot be reproduced, the National Personnel Records Center may issue NA Form 13038, Certification of Military Service, as an official substitute document.

Electronic copies of DD Form 214 may also be obtained through online veteran records systems operated by the Department of Veterans Affairs and Department of Defense.

== Corrections ==
Corrections or additions to DD Form 214 are issued on DD Form 215, titled Correction to DD Form 214, Certificate of Release or Discharge from Active Duty. DD Form 215 is distributed in the same manner as the original DD Form 214.

== In popular culture ==
American rapper JPEGMAFIA released a song titled "DD Form 214" on his 2018 album Veteran. He previously served in the United States Air Force for four years.

== See also ==
- Military discharge
