= No Trace Camping =

Entertainment financier

- Type: Privately held company
- Industry: Motion pictures and television
- Founded: 2008
- Headquarters: Toronto, Los Angeles
- Key people: Jesse Shapira, David Gross, Jeff Arkuss
- Website: notracecamping.com

No Trace Camping is a Canadian–American independent feature film and television financier and production company based in Toronto and Los Angeles. Its principals are Jesse Shapira, David Gross and Jeff Arkuss. Founded in 2008, the company produced the films Goon, The F Word (a.k.a. What If) and Room, as well as Goon: Last of the Enforcers.

The company's first film was Goon in 2011 starring Seann William Scott, Liev Schreiber, Alison Pill, Jay Baruchel and Eugene Levy. The film is an adaptation of the book Goon: The True Story of an Unlikely Journey Into Minor League Hockey by Adam Frattasio and Doug Smith. Footage from Smith's career as an enforcer is shown during the film's credits, and Smith said in an interview with Grantland.com that he is happy with the finished film. The book was discovered by Jesse Shapira and his producing partner David Gross. Along with Baruchel and Evan Goldberg, they developed the script and then proceeded to package and independently finance the movie. It was the first film under their No Trace Camping banner. The film debuted at TIFF in September 2011 where it was sold to US distributor Magnolia.

Next, the company produced The F Word in 2013. The script, based on a play by T.J. Dawe and Michael Rinaldi, was included in the Black List's 2008 survey of Hollywood's best un-produced screenplays. The film starred Daniel Radcliffe, Zoe Kazan, Mackenzie Davis, Rafe Spall and Adam Driver. The film was acquired by CBS Films at TIFF in 2013.

Most recently, No Trace Camping co-financed and produced the 2015 adaptation of the New York Times best-selling novel, Room, by Emma Donoghue, starring Brie Larson, Jacob Tremblay, William H. Macy and Joan Allen. The film premiered at the 2015 Telluride Film Festival and won the prestigious People's Choice Award at TIFF. The film has since been shortlisted for numerous award-season honors.

The latest film from the company is Goon: Last of the Enforcers. In addition to bringing back the original cast, including Seann William Scott, Liev Scrieber, Allison Pill, Marc-André Grondin and Jay Baruchel, the sequel also adds Wyatt Russell to the mix. It marks the directorial debut of Jay Baruchel, who also returns in a writing capacity, with co-writer Jesse Chabot.

== Filmography ==
Year	Title	Director	Writer
2012	Goon	Michael Dowse	Jay Baruchel; Evan Goldberg
2014	The F Word	Michael Dowse	Elan Mastai
2015	Room	Lenny Abrahamson	Emma Donoghue
2016	Goon: Last of the Enforcers	Jay Baruchel	Jesse Chabot; Jay Baruchel
2018	Kin	Jonathan Baker & Josh Baker	Daniel Casey
2020	The Broken Hearts Gallery	Natalie Krinsky	Natalie Krinsky
2025	Whistle	Corin Hardy	Owen Egerton
