= All Our Wrong Todays =

2017 novel by Elan Mastai

- First US edition cover
- Author: Elan Mastai
- Language: English
- Genre: Science fiction
- Publisher: Dutton (US); Doubleday Canada (CA)
- Publication date: February 7, 2017
- Publication place: United States; Canada
- Media type: Hardback
- Pages: 373 (US); 384 (CA)
- Award: Prix Bob Morane
- ISBN: 978-1-101-98513-7 (US); 978-0-385-68684-6 (CA)

All Our Wrong Todays is a 2017 science fiction novel by Canadian screenwriter Elan Mastai. It is Mastai's debut novel and was first published in February 2017 in the United States by Dutton, in Canada by Doubleday Canada, and in the United Kingdom in March 2017 by Michael Joseph. The novel is about a man from a utopia in an alternate reality who finds himself stuck in our reality after a time travel accident.

All Our Wrong Todays was nominated for the 2018 Sidewise Award for Alternate History, and the 2018 Sunburst Award for Canadian Literature of the Fantastic. It was also longlisted for the 2019 Canadian Broadcasting Corporation's Canada Reads competition. The book has been translated into 24 languages, including French by Jean Bonnefoy as Tous nos contretemps, published by Bragelonne in September 2017, and German by Rainer Schmidt as Die beste meiner Welten, published by Goldmann in April 2018. Tous nos contretemps won the 2018 Prix Bob Morane for Best Foreign Novel.

== Background ==
Mastai started writing at 26 after his mother died. He said she had motivated him to make the most of the time he had, and to stop erecting barriers that prevented him from pursuing his goals. "I started writing because of that. I started going from wanting to be a writer to actually writing." Mastai worked in the Hollywood film industry for a decade writing screenplays for several films, including Alone in the Dark, The Samaritan and The F Word (also released as What If). Then he began working on a story about a man struck in an alternate reality, and realized that it was a novel, not a screenplay. Mastai saw this as a new challenge, and an opportunity to write about his mother. "I had never really written too much about that experience of losing my mom. I didn’t want to write some sort of grim and depressing memoir about it either … So on one level I was writing about my mother’s death, but I used time machines ... to do it." Writing All Our Wrong Todays was also an opportunity for Mastai to free himself from the limitations of screenplays, and to experiment.

Some of the ideas for All Our Wrong Todays came from Mastai's grandfather. Mastai explained that his grandfather had an extensive collection of 1950s and 1960s science fiction magazines with "wild, weird stories and ... garishly painted covers of robots and rocket ships, mad scientists and nifty technology." As a youngster, Mastai often wondered why the future dreamt up by those artists and writers was not happening. Years later, the premise for the novel occurred to him: what if that future did happen, but Tom Barren travelled back in time and wiped it out? Mastai started writing All Our Wrong Todays in July 2014. He secured a $1.25 million book deal with US publisher, Dutton in 2015, and finished writing the novel in May 2016.

== Plot summary ==
Tom Barren wakes up in 2016 in a reality that is not his own. He comes from an alternate reality where, thanks to Lionel Goettreider's 1965 invention of the Goettreider Engine, the world has unlimited free energy. In 2016, Tom's world became a techno-utopia with jet packs, hovercars and space colonization. Tom's domineering father, Victor Barren invents the time machine and wants to send someone back to 1965 to witness Lionel turning on his engine. Penelope Weschler, a no-nonsense high flyer, is chosen to be the first "chrononaut", and Tom is named her understudy. But Tom falls in love with Penelope and accidentally gets her pregnant, which disqualifies her from the program. Victor cancels the time travel experiment and Penelope kills herself. A distraught Tom secretly commandeers the time machine and sends himself back to 1965, where he watches Lionel turn his machine on. But things go wrong with the time machine's cloaking device, and Tom materializes in the room. A startled Lionel turns his engine off again, and this erases Tom's utopian timeline and he finds himself in 2016 in our present-day technologically-stunted realty.

In this timeline, Tom is John, a successful architect. His father is kind and understanding, his mother (who had died in Tom's alternate reality) is alive, and he has a sister. Tom also meets and falls in love with Penny, a mild-mannered book store owner. Tom/John tries to convince Penny and his family that this reality is "wrong", but they do not believe him. Tom realizes that the only way to prove his story is to track down Lionel Goettreider. Tom finds out that after the Goettreider Engine mishap in 1965, Lionel became a recluse and moved to Hong Kong, taking his engine with him. He discovers that Lionel secretly turned the engine back on again, but did not show it to the world. Tom also learns that Lionel has invented his own time machine, and wants to send Tom back to 1965 to correct the mistake Tom made and restore the timeline.

== Critical reception ==
In a review in Locus magazine, American science fiction author Paul Di Filippo called All Our Wrong Todays "a great and exceptional find". He said that for a mainstream writer to choose science fiction for his debut novel, Mastai has proved himself to be quite capable. Di Filippo said Mastai handles the genre with "playful fluency" and "does not make a single misstep with his speculations or language". The protagonist's admiration of Kurt Vonnegut early in the book led Di Filippo to state, "its punchy, demotic, self-denigrating prose ... and its general fascination with the ways humans can screw up" makes All Our Wrong Todays "pure Vonnegut". Di Filippo added that the book's "elaborate paradoxes and causal loops that any great time travel novel must offer" puts it alongside "classics such as Heinlei's By His Bootstraps".

Kayti Burt called All Our Wrong Todays "a fun, fast-paced, thought-provoking ride". In a review of the book at Den of Geek Burt wrote that it has some "grand [and] insightful things" to say about our reality and the possible alternates. She found the structure of the book "unusual" for a time travel story: it is a science fiction novel presented as a "memoir" with a literary feel that makes it closer to Niffenegger's The Time Traveler's Wife than Wells's Time Machine. Burt also found the book clever in the way it describes our reality as the "wrong" one, and how the protagonist is an unreliable narrator who is "often unlikable ... self-indulgent [and] thoughtless".

American novelist Keith Donohue described All Our Wrong Todays as a "dazzling and complex novel". In a review in The Washington Post, he said the book has an "ingenuous plot" that winds its way through alternate realities, and tackles the familiar problems of time travel "in fascinating new ways". Donohue added that readers who sometimes wish they could turn back the clock may find comfort "in the masochistic pleasures of this trippy and ultimately touching novel."

Reviewing All Our Wrong Todays in Quill & Quire, August C. Bourré wrote that much of the book is taken up by Tom reminiscing the world he has lost, and Mastai uses Tom's nostalgia to examine both his world and the "wrong" world he finds himself stuck in. Bourré said that as the book progresses, Mastai's "metaphors or insights [become] more sophisticated than the chatty tone in which the novel is narrated", but felt it would have been better to have them start at the beginning. Bourré concluded that this "is a clever book with a lot of potential", but complained that some of the Mastai's philosophizing tends to get "in his own way [and] prevents the full realization of that potential."

== Adaptation ==
All Our Wrong Todays was published in February 2017, and a month later, Paramount Pictures and Amy Pascal secured the screen rights to the book for $1.25 million. Mastai signed a contract with Paramount to write the screenplay for a potential film, and he submitted a draft before the book tour began in March 2017.

In January 2021, Peacock announced that Seth MacFarlane and Pascal will produce an adaptation of All Our Wrong Todays for a TV series. Mastai will write the script.
