= Random Acts of Violence =

Random Acts of Violence may refer to:

- Random Acts of Violence (comics), a 2010 graphic novel
- Random Acts of Violence (film), a Canadian slasher horror film
- "Random Acts of Violence" (CSI)
