= The Broken Hearts Gallery =

2020 romantic comedy film

- Theatrical release poster
- Directed by: Natalie Krinsky
- Written by: Natalie Krinsky
- Produced by: David Gross
- Starring: Geraldine Viswanathan; Dacre Montgomery; Utkarsh Ambudkar; Molly Gordon; Phillipa Soo; Bernadette Peters
- Cinematography: Alar Kivilo
- Edited by: Shawn Paper
- Music by: Genevieve Vincent
- Production companies: TriStar Pictures; Stage 6 Films; No Trace Camping; Telefilm Canada; Ontario Creates
- Distributed by: Sony Pictures Releasing (International); Elevation Pictures (Canada)
- Release dates: September 3, 2020 (Sony Pictures Studios); September 11, 2020 (United States)
- Running time: 108 minutes
- Countries: Canada; United States
- Language: English
- Budget: $8 million
- Box office: $4.8 million

The Broken Hearts Gallery is a 2020 romantic comedy film written and directed by Natalie Krinsky, in her directorial debut. Executive produced by Selena Gomez, the film stars Geraldine Viswanathan, Dacre Montgomery, Utkarsh Ambudkar, Molly Gordon, Phillipa Soo and Bernadette Peters. The plot follows a 26-year-old in New York City who gets dumped by her latest boyfriend and creates an art gallery to display items from people's previous relationships. Theatrically released in the United States on September 11, 2020 amid the COVID-19 pandemic, the film grossed $4 million and received generally positive reviews from critics.

== Plot ==
Lucy is a young assistant at the Woolf Gallery in New York City. Idolizing her boss, Eva Woolf, she readily provides info about her to her boyfriend and colleague, Max. Her friends and roommates, law student Amanda and model Nadine, hear her talking non-stop about him. At the gallery opening, instead of Max asking her to move in, she is both dumped for his ex Amelia and fired.

Drunk and despondent, Lucy climbs into Nick's car, believing it is her Lyft. The kind Nick takes her home while she describes the gallery fiasco. For weeks, she wallows in her room, with her roommates' support. Finally, they urge her to clear out her cave of memorabilia from past relationships. Unable to sell her mementos, Lucy follows Max and Amelia into a restaurant. Nick sees her and steers her outside before she can cause a scene.

Lucy and Nick end up at the Chloe hotel, an old YMCA. Renovating his dream boutique hotel for five years, he is out of money and needs help to keep the project going. He encourages her to hang Max's tie on an old nail. Inspired, she writes a caption, and they jointly come up with the concept of a Broken Heart Gallery.

Nick shows up at Lucy's, inviting her to see something added to the wall. Excited, she envisions a chance for New Yorkers to connect over shared loss and humanity. Meeting and bonding with Marcos, Nick's friend on the building project, they convince Nick to give her gallery space in exchange for work.

Lucy shares photos with their stories on social media #BROKENHEARTGALLERY, then posts short videos of people parting with their memorabilia. She sees first-hand how freeing it is for people to give up their baggage.

Seeking furniture and decorations for the gallery-hotel, they pound the streets, reclaiming pieces as they go. On the way, they chat about themselves. The money to start the hotel came from his grandmother's inheritance. Lucy's mother sees art everywhere. Browsing in a secondhand-book shop, Lucy sees Max, follows him to a café, and meets Amelia. Nick rescues her again, saying they are off to a meeting about their hot new gallery. They leave, Max looking intrigued.

While Lucy is alone one day in the hotel-gallery, a cold, blonde woman arrives looking for Nick, and declines to leave a message. Shortly thereafter, the three roommates invite Nick, Marco and his wife to a karaoke night birthday bash. Lucy shows Nick New York magazine mentioning their project, and she tells him about her idea for a ball opening. They sing a "Don't Go Breaking My Heart" duet. Marco (like her roommates) suggests Nick ask her out.

Arriving home at 3 am, they find Max out front. After railing on him in Lucy's defense, Amanda and Nadine head up. Max is telling her he wants her back when Nick shows up with birthday cake and the men butt heads. She and Max stay out, talking, and she agrees to a lunch.

As Nick's loan falls through, he tells her to rehome her exhibit, so Lucy approaches every gallery she knows. At lunch with Max, he suggests Eva Woolf, who surprisingly offers gallery space. Seemingly about to take it, as she and Max leave together, she has an epiphany. She asks Nadine for help in breaking up with him. He tells her Amelia dumped him, and she concludes that they were not meant to be together, as she is the hero in his love story, and he is the villain in hers. She tells Nick, who informs her that now he has a mystery backer providing the finance to complete the venue. They all work to get the opening ready.

Lucy opens up to Nick, introducing him to her mother, Cheryl, who is in a home due to dementia. Later on, Nick and Lucy make love. Then Chloe appears (the cold woman from weeks ago). Lucy leaves, hurt. Finding her, Nick tries to explain that it is over with Chloe, and he only kept Chloe's name on the hotel because changing it would be too expensive. He says he will stay away from the gallery opening, so as not to distract Lucy from her triumph.

Eva Woolf unexpectedly contributes an item to Lucy's exhibition, donating the box of the wedding ring used to fund her own gallery, saying, "Pain is inevitable. It's what you do with it that matters."

Before the opening, Marco and his wife find Nick, who claims to be ill. Marco tells him it is heartbreak, and that Lucy organized his mystery backer (who is Eva Woolf). During Lucy's opening speech, Nick bursts in with a neon sign, with the new name, The Broken Hearts Hotel. As he professes his love for her, she descends from the balcony and tells him she reciprocates his love.

== Cast ==
- Geraldine Viswanathan as Lucy Gulliver
- Dacre Montgomery as Nick Danielson
- Utkarsh Ambudkar as Max Vora
- Molly Gordon as Amanda
- Phillipa Soo as Nadine
- Bernadette Peters as Eva Woolf
- Arturo Castro as Marcos
- Suki Waterhouse as Chloe
- Ego Nwodim as Harvard
- Taylor Hill as Taylor
- Roy Choi as himself
- Megan Ferguson as Randy
- Tattiawna Jones as Dr. Amelia Black
- Nathan Dales as Jeff

== Production ==
In May 2019, it was announced that Geraldine Viswanathan, Dacre Montgomery and Utkarsh Ambudkar had joined the cast of the film, then titled The Broken Heart Gallery, with Natalie Krinsky directing from a screenplay she wrote. Selena Gomez serves as an executive producer under her July Moon Productions banner. In September 2019, it was announced Molly Gordon, Suki Waterhouse, Phillipa Soo, Arturo Castro and Bernadette Peters had joined the cast of the film.

Principal photography began in Toronto, Canada in July 2019. Filming also took place in New York City and wrapped in late-August.

== Release ==
In June 2020, TriStar Pictures and Stage 6 Films acquired distribution rights to the film, and set it for a July 10, 2020, release. It was then delayed to July 17, and then again to August 7, 2020, due to the COVID-19 pandemic. However, it was later pulled from the schedule, eventually being scheduled for a September 11, 2020, release. On September 3, 2020, the film premiered at Sony Pictures Studios' drive-in on its Culver City lot as part of the company's "Drive-In Experience" event.

== Reception ==
=== Box office ===
In its opening weekend, The Broken Hearts Gallery grossed $1.1 million from 2,024 theaters, finishing fourth. The film fell 30% in its second weekend, grossing $800,000, then made $470,000 its third weekend.

=== Critical response ===
On review aggregator Rotten Tomatoes, the film has an approval rating of 80% based on 117 reviews, with an average rating of 6.6/10. The website's critics consensus reads: "The Broken Hearts Gallery is a rom-com with few surprises, but plenty of charm – led by a performance from Geraldine Viswanathan that's easy to love." On Metacritic, the film has a weighted average score of 57 out of 100, based on 21 critics, indicating "mixed or average" reviews. Audiences polled by CinemaScore gave the film an average grade of "B" on an A+ to F scale, while PostTrak reported 77% of filmgoers gave it a positive score.

Ryan Lattanzio of IndieWire gave the film a "B−" grade praised Viswanathan's performance as "totally winning" and wrote: "The Broken Hearts Gallery is pure glossy fantasy, though Viswanathan's puckish and self-deprecating performance suggests a greater mess waiting to break out of this slick offering. (For all its sleekness, Alar Kivilo's cinematography deftly captures the patchwork textures of Brooklyn.)"
