= Doug Smith (author) =

American ice hockey player and author

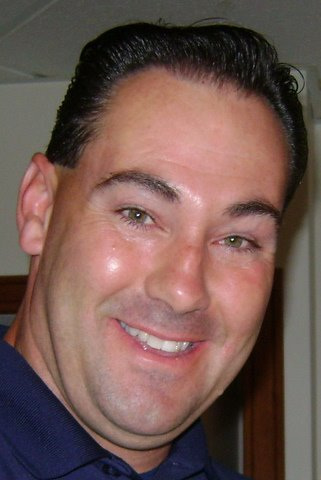
- Smith in 2012
- Born: December 27, 1964 (age 61) Hanover, Massachusetts, U.S.
- Height: 6 ft 2 in (188 cm)
- Weight: 220 lb (100 kg; 15 st 10 lb)
- Position: Right wing
- Shot: Right
- Played for: Carolina Thunderbirds; Johnstown Chiefs; Miramichi Gagnon Packers; Moncton Hawks; Phoenix Roadrunners (IHL); Springfield Falcons; Louisiana IceGators
- Playing career: 1988–1998

Doug "The Thug" Smith (born December 27, 1964) is an American retired minor-league ice hockey player who co-authored a biography about his time spent playing professional hockey, Goon: The True Story of an Unlikely Journey into Minor League Hockey, with Adam Frattasio. Smith's role on the teams he played for was that of the enforcer, which led the Hanover, Massachusetts, native to average 6.73 penalty minutes per game over his 60-game career.

Smith's book was later adapted into the comedy film Goon (2011), starring Seann William Scott in the role based on Smith. A sequel followed, entitled Goon: Last of the Enforcers (2017). Smith made a cameo appearance in the sequel.

== Biography ==
Smith's athletic career started with boxing, which culminated in a split-decision loss in the Massachusetts heavyweight Golden Gloves final in 1984. While training at the Hanover Police Boys' Club, his friend, Adam Frattasio, encouraged him to try hockey fighting. He first laced up skates at the age of 19, played in amateur leagues at 21, and made his first minor-league hockey team at 24 when he won a championship with the Carolina Thunderbirds of the first-year East Coast Hockey League during the 1988–89 season. It was in the East Coast League where an Erie, Pennsylvania sportswriter gave Smith the moniker "The Thug" when describing Smith's role initiating a period-ending, bench-clearing brawl against the hometown Erie Panthers. Smith went on to play for six other teams in three leagues, his most productive tour being with the Miramichi Gagnon Packers of the New Brunswick Senior Hockey League. Smith received additional invitations to continue playing in the States, particularly to finish out seasons for teams in various lower minor-leagues, but his new job as a police officer in Massachusetts limited his opportunities to participate in sporadic games with the intention of fighting the opponent's toughest player(s).

After retiring from hockey, Smith has worked as a coach within the Boston Bruins organization, showing their players how to defend themselves. He enjoyed a 20-year stint as an assistant coach for the three-time state-champion Hanover High School hockey team, and has logged significant time as an on-ice official, including two years patrolling the ice in the professional Federal Hockey League. He continues to work as an on-ice hockey-fight trainer, working with such NHL heavyweights as Steve MacIntyre and John Scott.

Additionally, Smith is a police officer, currently with the Hanson police department since 1999. Smith has two children with his wife, Sharon.

== Awards and accomplishments ==
- 1988-89, Riley Cup Champion (Carolina Thunderbirds)
- 2012, Hanover High School Hockey Hall of Fame inductee

== Career statistics ==
			Regular season						Playoffs
Season	Team	League	GP	G	A	Pts	+/-	PIM	GP	G	A	Pts	PIM
1988–89	Carolina Thunderbirds	ECHL	28	0	1	1	10	179		--	--	--	--	--
1989–90	Johnstown Chiefs	ECHL	3	0	1	1	1	29		--	--	--	--	--
1990–91	Miramichi Packers	NBSHL	23	0	3	3	0	170		--	--	--	--	--
1993–94	Moncton Hawks	AHL	1	0	0	0	0	5	--	--	--	--	--
1994–95	Phoenix Roadrunners	IHL	1	0	0	0	0	0	--	--	--	--	--
1994–95	Springfield Falcons	AHL	1	0	0	0	1	14	--	--	--	--	--
1997–98	Springfield Falcons	AHL	1	0	0	0	0	0	--	--	--	--	--
1997–98	Louisiana IceGators	ECHL	2	0	0	0	0	7	--	--	--	--	--
