= The Successor (2023 film) =

2023 thriller drama film

- French: Le Successeur
- Directed by: Xavier Legrand
- Written by: Xavier Legrand
- Based on: L'Ascendant by Alexandre Postel
- Produced by: Alexandre Gavras
- Starring: Marc-André Grondin; Yves Jacques; Anne-Élisabeth Bossé
- Cinematography: Nathalie Durand
- Edited by: Yorgos Lamprinos; Julie Wuillai
- Music by: Sébastian Akchoté
- Production companies: KG Productions; Metafilms; Stenola Productions
- Distributed by: Haut et Court; MK2 Films
- Release date: 27 September 2023 (San Sebastian)
- Running time: 118 minutes
- Countries: France; Belgium; Canada
- Language: French

The Successor (French: Le Successeur) is a 2023 thriller drama film directed by Xavier Legrand. Adapted from Alexandre Postel's 2015 novel L'Ascendant, the film stars Marc-André Grondin as Ellias Barnes, a Canadian man who has become head of a major fashion house in Paris, but must face up to his past when his father unexpectedly dies.

The cast also includes Yves Jacques, Laetitia Isambert-Denis, Anne-Élisabeth Bossé, Blandine Bury, Vincent Leclerc, Louis Champagne, Mireille Naggar, Marie-France Lambert, Thierry Harcourt, Florence Janas, Anne Loiret, Sarah Desjeunes Rico, Ted Pluviose, Jin Xuan Mao, Cindy Doutres, Nine d'Urso and Veronika Vasilyeva Rije.
