= Already Gone (film) =

- Film poster
- Directed by: Christopher Kenneally
- Written by: Christopher Kenneally
- Produced by: Jordan Beckerman; Robyn K. Bennett; Shruti Ganguly; Russell Geyser; Jordan Yale Levine
- Starring: Tyler Dean Flores; Justine Skye; Seann William Scott; Shiloh Fernandez
- Cinematography: Spenser T. Nottage
- Edited by: Ron Dulin
- Music by: Brendan Ryan
- Production companies: RainMaker Films; Yale Productions
- Distributed by: Gravitas Ventures
- Release date: August 16, 2019
- Running time: 92 minutes
- Country: United States
- Language: English

Already Gone is a 2019 American thriller drama film written and directed by Christopher Kenneally and starring Tyler Dean Flores, Justine Skye, Seann William Scott and Shiloh Fernandez. It is Kenneally's feature narrative directorial debut. Keanu Reeves served as an executive producer of the film.

== Synopsis ==
Robinson is a teenager who escapes his abusive stepfather and rescues Martin's girlfriend, Keesha, who is an exotic dancer. They run from Brooklyn, with Martin hunting them down, and meet an aspiring artist for whom Keesha begins to have feelings.

== Cast ==
- Tyler Dean Flores as Robinson
- Justine Skye as Keesha
- Shiloh Fernandez as Edwin
- Seann William Scott as Martin
- Raquel Castro as Carmen
- Maga Uzo as Alma

== Reception ==
John Defore of The Hollywood Reporter gave the film a positive review, praising Kenneally's direction and writing.
