= Goon: Last of the Enforcers =

- Theatrical release poster
- Directed by: Jay Baruchel
- Written by: Jay Baruchel; Jesse Chabot
- Produced by: David Gross; Jesse Shapira; Jeff Arkuss; Andre Rouleau
- Starring: Seann William Scott; Alison Pill; Marc-André Grondin; Wyatt Russell; Callum Keith Rennie; Jason Jones; Jay Baruchel; Elisha Cuthbert; Kim Coates; Liev Schreiber
- Cinematography: Paul Sarossy
- Edited by: Jason Eisener
- Music by: Trevor Morris; Wade MacNeil
- Production companies: No Trace Camping; Caramel Films
- Distributed by: Entertainment One
- Release dates: March 17, 2017 (Canada); September 1, 2017 (United States)
- Running time: 101 minutes
- Country: Canada
- Language: English
- Box office: CAD$1.2 million

Goon: Last of the Enforcers is a 2017 Canadian sports comedy film directed by Jay Baruchel in his directorial debut and written by Baruchel and Jesse Chabot. A sequel to Goon (2011), the film stars Seann William Scott, Baruchel, Liev Schreiber, Alison Pill, Elisha Cuthbert, Wyatt Russell, Marc-André Grondin and Kim Coates.

Principal photography began in Toronto on June 22, 2015. The film was released in Canada on March 17, 2017, and on September 1, 2017, in the United States.

== Plot ==
During an NHL lockout, Doug "The Thug" Glatt's minor-league team, the Halifax Highlanders, receive increased media coverage. Their owner, Hyrum Cain, seeks to capitalize on the attention. For the opening game, Doug is promoted to captain, but loses a fight with the rival team's enforcer, Anders Cain, the son of the Highlanders' owner.

Badly injured, Doug retires to a more stable job as an insurance salesman, while he and his pregnant wife Eva make preparations for their child. Without Doug, the Highlanders embark on a long losing streak which prompts the owner to push for changes. He signs several overseas players and his son. Doug finds no joy in his new job, and tries to find a way back into hockey. His old rival, Ross "The Boss" Rhea, agrees to train him in fighting with his left hand, to offset his weakened right. Ross has been competing in a hockey fighting league, and when that league has a match scheduled in Halifax, where it will likely be viewed by Hyrum, he convinces Doug to compete as a demonstration that he is fit to play. Doug wins a ten-man battle royale, observed by Hyrum.

Anders has not been performing well for the Highlanders, and gets suspended for violence. Hyrum adds Doug back to the roster as competition for his son. Before Doug's first game back, Eva makes him promise not to fight, for the sake of their future child. Doug reluctantly agrees, and the team goes on a winning streak, but when Anders returns from suspension, he goads Doug into being more aggressive.

Doug and Anders interrupt a game during a dispute, and they are both suspended for the next one. During the game's afterparty, Anders provokes Doug into a fight and, when his back is turned, breaks a beer bottle over his skull. When Eva sees that Doug has been fighting again, she kicks him out of the house.

The Highlanders must win the last two games of the season to get into the playoffs. Hyrum signs Ross, at the expense of firing Anders. While Ross helps the Highlanders to win the first of their last two games, Eva goes into labor, and Doug reconciles with her as they head to the hospital. After having her baby, Eva realizes that the same drive that led Doug to be with her during the birth, is what pushes him to want to defend his teammates on the ice, and she gives Doug her blessing to continue fighting.

Anders rejoins his old team, who will play the Highlanders in the last game of the season with a playoff spot on the line. Anders gravely injures Ross, so Doug enters the rink in retaliation.

Doug beats Anders, but when showing mercy at the end of the fight, Anders vengefully threatens him, declaring he will never stop coming for him until they end up like Ross, being carried out on stretchers. Realizing that his new family is more important to him than hockey, Doug uses his weakened right arm to level Anders in the face just as he was about to strike again, throwing his arm out and being helped off the ice.

Hyrum rushes to his son's aid, Anders tells him that he hates hockey, and they seem to make amends. Knowing that further injury to his right arm would be career-ending, Doug realizes that his hockey days are behind him. He watches as the Highlanders win the game in the final seconds, and during the celebration, he sets his stick down and goes home.

In a post-credits scene, a female reporter talks about the Hockey Story. Doug doesn't know if he's a Gretzky and steals her microphone.

== Cast ==
- Seann William Scott as Douglass Menachem "Doug The Thug" Glatt
- Alison Pill as Eva Glatt, Doug's wife
- Wyatt Russell as Anders Cain, a volatile young captain of the Halifax Highlanders
- Liev Schreiber as Ross "The Boss" Rhea
- Marc-André Grondin as Xavier LaFlamme
- Kim Coates as Ronnie Hortense, Highlanders coach
- Jay Baruchel as Patrick "Pat" Hoolihan
- Elisha Cuthbert as Mary, Eva's outlandish sister
- Callum Keith Rennie, as Hyrum Cain, Highlanders owner and father of Anders
- Jonathan Cherry as Goalie Marco "Belchie" Belchior
- Trent Pardy as Stevenson
- Karl Graboshas as Oleg Yakovlena
- George Tchortov as Evgeni Yakovlena
- Richard Clarkin as Gord Ogilvey
- Jason Jones as Bob Forbes
- T.J. Miller as Chad Bailey
- David Paetkau as Ira Glatt
- Ellen David as Mrs. Glatt
- Larry C. Woo as Park Kim
- Boomer Phillips as Jared Walters
- Nathan Dales as Petr
- James Duthie as Himself
- Tessa Bonhomme as Female Reporter

Current and former hockey players Tyler Seguin, Michael Del Zotto, Brandon Prust, George Parros, Colton Orr, Georges Laraque, Mel Angelstad and Nathan Bastian make appearances in the film.

Doug "The Hammer" Smith, whom Doug Glatt is based on, has a cameo in the "Bruised and Battered" sequence. He is head-butted by Seann William Scott in the square-off between the two Dougs.

== Production ==
On September 24, 2012, it was announced that Jay Baruchel would be returning to write the sequel to Goon along with Jesse Chabot, while Michael Dowse was set to return to direct the film, and Evan Goldberg to produce. On May 15, 2015, it was announced that Baruchel would make his directorial debut on the film, titled Goon: Last of the Enforcers, and would also return in the role of Pat, while Seann William Scott would also return to play the role of the hockey enforcer, Doug "The Thug" Glatt. Goldberg would be executive producer, while David Gross, Jesse Shapira, Jeff Arkuss and Andre Rouleau would be producers on the film. On June 8, 2015 Elisha Cuthbert joined the cast of the film along with the returning cast of Liev Schreiber and Alison Pill from the first film.

On June 10, 2015, the complete cast of the film was announced by Entertainment One, Wyatt Russell was set to play Anders Cain, a volatile young captain of the Halifax Highlanders, Marc-André Grondin to play a superstar Xavier LaFlamme, Kim Coates as Highlanders coach Ronnie Hortense, Pill would star as Glatt's love interest Eva and Schreiber as Ross "The Boss" Rhea, while Cuthbert would play Mary, the outlandish sister of Pill's character Eva, who is now married to Doug the Thug. In a tweet on July 7, 2015 from the set of the film, TSN's Sportscaster James Duthie revealed that he and T.J. Miller were cast to play the sportscasters in the film. On July 23, 2015, real NHL players Tyler Seguin and Michael Del Zotto were spotted on the set during filming along with Scott. On August 7, 2015, a tweet by Georges Laraque stated that he was headed to the set with Colton Orr and George Parros.

=== Filming ===
Principal photography on the film began on June 22, 2015, in Toronto, Ontario. Baruchel also tweeted the photo of the cast from the set. Late-June, filming was taking place in Hamilton, Ontario's Corktown area, the Barrie Molson Centre in Barrie in July until August 13, 2015 and near Bayfront Park in Hamilton.

== Reception ==
On review aggregator Rotten Tomatoes, the film has an approval rating of 42% based on 62 reviews, with an average rating of 5/10. The site's critical consensus reads, "Seann William Scott remains as watchable as ever in the title role, but Goon: Last of the Enforcers repeats its predecessor's violent and profane formula to diminishing effect." On Metacritic, which assigns a normalized rating to reviews, the film has a weighted average score of 48 out of 100, based on 17 critics, indicating "mixed or average" reviews.

Barry Hertz from The Globe and Mail gave the film 3 out of 4 and wrote "Baruchel's sequel is everything Dowse's original film was, amped up a degree or three: The fights involving dim-bulb hero Doug (Seann William Scott) and his various rivals are bloodier, the locker-room talk is dirtier and the on-ice action is slicker. The unlikely project – how many made-in-Canada films spark a franchise? – doesn't quite reach the heights of the original film, which found surprising pathos in Doug's tale of sweet good guy to brutal goon. But it delivers on nearly every other scale, including standout performances from returning players Scott, Alison Pill and Liev Schreiber, as well as some bits of comic gold courtesy of series rookies Wyatt Russell, T.J. Miller and Jason Jones." Toronto Sun gave the film 3.5 out of 5, and stated "Violent, crude and really funny, Goon: Last of The Enforcers, works for the same reason the original Goon worked — you will love the characters." National Post gave the film a 1 out of 4.

== See also ==
- List of films about ice hockey
