= Goon (film) =

2011 sports comedy film

- Theatrical release poster
- Directed by: Michael Dowse
- Written by: Jay Baruchel; Evan Goldberg
- Based on: Goon: The True Story of an Unlikely Journey into the Minor League Hockey by Adam Frattasio and Douglas Smith
- Produced by: Hartley Gorenstein: Don Carmody; David Gross; Jesse Shapira; André Rouleau; Jay Baruchel; Ian Dimerman
- Starring: Seann William Scott; Liev Schreiber; Jay Baruchel; Alison Pill; Marc-André Grondin; Kim Coates; Eugene Levy
- Cinematography: Bobby Shore
- Edited by: Reginald Harkema
- Music by: Ramachandra Borcar
- Production companies: No Trace Camping; Caramel Films; Myriad Pictures; Don Carmody Productions; Inferno Pictures
- Distributed by: Alliance Films (Canada); Magnet Releasing (United States)
- Release dates: September 10, 2011 (Toronto); February 24, 2012 (Canada)
- Running time: 92 minutes
- Countries: Canada; United States
- Language: English
- Budget: $12 million
- Box office: $7 million

Goon is a 2011 Canadian-American sports comedy film directed by Michael Dowse and written by Jay Baruchel and Evan Goldberg, based on the autobiography Goon: The True Story of an Unlikely Journey into Minor League Hockey by Adam Frattasio and Douglas Smith. Starring Seann William Scott, Liev Schreiber, Jay Baruchel, Alison Pill, Marc-André Grondin, Kim Coates, and Eugene Levy, the film follows Doug "The Thug" Glatt (Scott), an exceedingly nice but slightly dimwitted bouncer who unexpectedly finds personal and professional fulfillment after becoming the enforcer for the Halifax Highlanders, a minor league ice hockey team, as he prepares to face off against Ross "The Boss" Rhea (Schreiber), the legendary enforcer for the St. John's Shamrocks.

Goon premiered at the Toronto International Film Festival on September 10, 2011, and was theatrically released in Canada on February 24, 2012. Despite largely positive reviews from critics, the film was a box office failure, grossing $7 million against its $12 million production budget. It received six nominations at the 1st Canadian Screen Awards, including Best Director for Dowse and Best Cinematography for Bobby Shore.

The film became a sleeper hit following its premiere on Netflix, leading to an increase in DVD sales and VOD downloads. This unexpected success ultimately resulted in a sequel, Goon: Last of the Enforcers, which was released in 2017. Goon has developed cult following in the years since its release, and Scott and Baruchel have expressed interest in the possibility of a third film.

== Plot ==
Doug Glatt is a polite, kind-hearted, but dim-witted bouncer at a local dive bar in the fictional hockey crazed town of Orangetown, Massachusetts. He feels ostracized from society, especially since his father and brother are both highly educated wealthy and successful physicians.

Doug attends a local minor league hockey game with his best friend, Pat, who hosts a public broadcast show recapping weekly hockey highlights called Hot Ice. Pat taunts the visiting team during a fight and one of their players climbs into the stands while shouting out a homophobic slur. Doug, whose brother is gay, steps in and easily beats up the opposing player. The next day, he gets a phone call from the coach of his hometown team Orangetown Assassins, who offers him a tryout to be an enforcer. He gets the position despite being a hilariously bad skater, and trains relentlessly to bring his skills up to par.

Meanwhile, legendary veteran enforcer, Ross "The Boss" Rhea is demoted to the minors after serving a 20-game suspension for slashing an opponent in the head from behind. Three years prior, he hit and concussed the highly skilled prospect Xavier Laflamme, who has had trouble recovering from the incident due to his fear of being hit again.

As a result, Laflamme is still stuck in the minors, playing for the Halifax Highlanders. As Doug's reputation grows, he earns the nickname "Doug the Thug". The head coach of the Assassins tells Doug that his brother, Highlanders' coach Ronnie, wants to hire him to protect Laflamme and be his roommate.

The Highlanders experience success with Doug as their enforcer, and he quickly becomes popular among fans and teammates, much to the disapproval of his parents and Laflamme, who loses ice time and the alternate-captaincy to him. Doug meets Eva, a hockey fan with a penchant for sleeping with players at a bar in Halifax and the two become romantically involved.

With four games left on their schedule, the Highlanders need two wins to secure a playoff spot. On a road game in Quebec, after an opposing player concusses Laflamme with a heavy hit, Doug savagely beats the player unconscious and is suspended for the next game against Rhea and the St. John's Shamrocks.

Doug encounters Rhea at a diner, where Rhea dismisses his belief that he is a hockey player, insisting that they are both "goons", and asserts that fans just want to see them bleed. Though Rhea acknowledges Doug's physical prowess and gives Doug his respect, he warns him that if they ever meet on the ice, he will not hold back. The Highlanders, with Doug suspended and Laflamme hospitalized, lose to the Shamrocks. The aging captain of the Highlanders, an inexperienced fighter, challenges Ross to a fight. Ross offers him a chance to back out but the player declines and quickly loses.

Doug reaches out to Laflamme and promises to always protect him on the ice; the incident touches Laflamme, who reconsiders his animosity towards him. In their next game, the Highlanders lead 2-1 thanks to strong teamwork between Doug and Laflamme. In the final seconds, Doug blocks a slapshot with his face and his ankle is injured in the ensuing scramble. The Highlanders win, but still need a win in a rematch with Rhea and the Shamrocks in their last game for a playoff spot.

Eva breaks up with her boyfriend to be with Doug, declaring that she loves him. Doug later allows her now-ex-boyfriend to beat him up, believing that he deserves it for coming between them.

After two periods, the Shamrocks are beating the Highlanders 2–0. Rhea and Doug mutually agree to fight in the third period. Although Rhea manages to knock him down and Doug re-breaks his recently injured ankle, Doug refuses to back down and eventually emerges victorious, leaving Rhea incapacitated on the ice, and knocking his tooth out. Ross smiles at seeing his tooth, satisfied that he lost to someone he considers a worthy opponent.

Eva and his teammates help a seriously injured Doug off the ice and Laflamme, inspired by Rhea's defeat, scores a natural hat trick, giving the Highlanders a 3–2 lead. As the game enters its final minute, Eva comforts Doug in the locker room as he comments, "I think I nailed him."

== Cast ==
- Seann William Scott as Douglass Menachem "Doug The Thug" Glatt
- Liev Schreiber as Ross "The Boss" Rhea
- Alison Pill as Eva
- Jay Baruchel as Pat
- Marc-André Grondin as Xavier Laflamme
- Eugene Levy as Dr. Glatt
- David Paetkau as Ira Glatt
- Kim Coates as Coach Ronnie Hortense
- Richard Clarkin as Gord Ogilvey
- Jonathan Cherry as Goalie Marco "Belchie" Belchior
- Ricky Mabe as John Stevenson
- Georges Laraque as Huntington
- Curt Keilback as Rod McCaudry
- Larry Woo as Park Kim
- Robb Wells (uncredited) as Production Assistant #1
- Mike Smith (uncredited) as Production Assistant #2
- John Paul Tremblay (uncredited) as Production Assistant #3
- Nicholas Campbell as Rollie Hortense

== Production notes ==
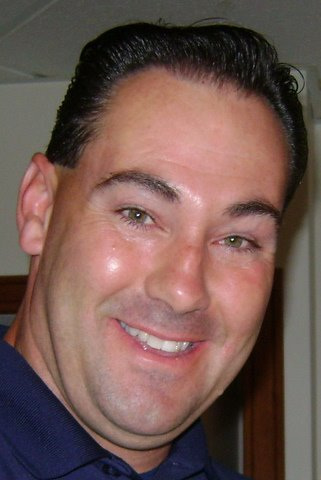
The film is an adaptation of the autobiography of Doug Smith

The film is an adaptation of the book Goon: The True Story of an Unlikely Journey into Minor League Hockey by Adam Frattasio and Doug Smith. Footage from Smith's career as an enforcer is shown during the film's credits, and Smith said in an interview with Grantland.com that he is happy with the finished film. The book was discovered by Jesse Shapira and his producing partner David Gross. Along with Baruchel and Goldberg, they developed the script and then proceeded to package and independently finance the movie. It was the first film under their No Trace Camping banner.

Some scenes are based on actual incidents, such as Glatt scoring a goal off his butt. "Dangerous" Doug Mann of the Columbus Cottonmouths scored a goal in overtime of Game 5 of the Central Hockey League Eastern Conference Finals against the Huntsville Channel Cats, when the puck deflected off his butt scoring the game's winning goal, sending Columbus to the Finals.

Former NHL enforcer Georges Laraque has a small role as an enforcer for the Albany Patriots. His character fights both Glatt and Rhea over the course of the film. He draws with Glatt and the outcome of his fight with Rhea is not shown. When Laraque's character fights Glatt, the dialogue closely resembles the dialogue used by Georges Laraque in a fight against Raitis Ivanāns in December 2006.

Goon was filmed in Brandon, Portage la Prairie and Winnipeg, Manitoba. Most of the hockey scenes were filmed at Stride Place (Portage Credit Union Centre at the time of filming), in Portage la Prairie, which substituted for the Halifax Metro Centre, the home arena for the Halifax Highlanders. Other hockey scenes were filmed at the St. James Civic Centre in Winnipeg and Westoba Place (the former Keystone Centre) in Brandon. Canada Life Centre (MTS Centre at the time) was used for the home arena of the Quebec Victoires. The Hot Ice public access TV show was filmed inside Tec Voc High School's Broadcasting Media Arts department. It also featured actors Robb Wells, Mike Smith, and John Paul Tremblay who play characters Ricky, Bubbles and Julian from Trailer Park Boys, as control room staff.

== Release ==
A red-band trailer for the film was released on IGN.

In Toronto and Montreal, prior to its premiere, posters for the film were removed from city bus shelters after several complaints from the public due to Baruchel making a "sexually suggestive gesture with his tongue and fingers." Publicity campaigns in the English Canada market focused on William Scott and Schreiber, while another catered for Quebec tastes amplified French-Canada actor Marc-Andre Grondin, then known best in the region for his role in “C.R.A.Z.Y.”

Alliance crafted dual publicity campaigns for “Goon,” one that featured Hollywood actors Seann William Scott and Liev Schreiber, which rolled out in most of the country, while another catered to Quebec tastes and focused on Francophone star Marc-Andre Grondin (“C.R.A.Z.Y.”).

The timing of the film's release was considered controversial by some as the previous summer featured the deaths of three NHL enforcers – Derek Boogaard, Rick Rypien and Wade Belak – all three of whom suffered from depression and head trauma that are believed to be factors in their deaths.

In Canada, "Goon" opened simultaneously in its original English-language version and a dubbed French translation for the Quebec market. It scored almost double the average market share in Quebec on its opening weekend, and nationwide ranked No. 1 at the box office, above several new Hollywood titles, including "Hall Pass." "Goon" brought in an estimated $1.2 million from 251 screens on its first three days of screening, as of Feb. 26. 2012.

== Reception ==
=== Critical response ===
On Rotten Tomatoes, the film has an approval rating of 81% based on 106 reviews, with an average rating of 6.5/10. The website's critics consensus reads: "Goon is a crude slapstick comedy with well-formed characters and a surprising amount of heart." On Metacritic the film has a weighted average score of 64 out of 100 based on 24 critics, indicating "generally favorable reviews".

Roger Ebert of the Chicago Sun-Times gave the film 3 out of 4 stars, and wrote: "The charm of Goon is that Doug Glatt (Scott) is a genial guy from a nice family. Just because he hands out concussions doesn't mean he dislikes anybody. He's just happy to be wearing a uniform." Robert Koehler of Variety magazine praised the performances: "The picture has a first-rate team of actors who visibly enjoy their roles and the sharp dialogue by Baruchel and Goldberg." Stephen Holden, writing for The New York Times, gave a positive review that credits all the major performances.

In 2023, Barry Hertz of The Globe and Mail named the film as one of the 23 best Canadian comedy films ever made.

=== Accolades ===
Goon was nominated in six categories at the 1st Canadian Screen Awards: Michael Dowse for Best Director, Jay Baruchel and Evan Goldberg for Best Adapted Screenplay, Bobby Shore for Best Cinematography, Lori Caputi and Brenda Magalas for Best Makeup, and Jay Baruchel and Kim Coates, both for Best Supporting Actor.

== Sequel ==
Baruchel wrote a sequel with Jesse Chabot. Michael Dowse was slated to return to direct but it was Baruchel who directed the film, making it his directorial debut. Evan Goldberg produced the sequel. The title of the film is Goon: Last of the Enforcers.

Baruchel expressed interest in the possibility of a third film, "I don’'t want to get into trouble, and I'm not saying there's going to be a Goon 3," Baruchel says, "but there's more than one way to skin a cat. We're not done in this universe yet."

== See also ==
- List of films about ice hockey
