= Random Acts of Violence (comics) =

2010 graphic novel

- Cover of the Random Acts of Violence trade paperback. Artwork by Giancarlo Caracuzzo and Paul Mounts.

Publication information
- Publisher: Image Comics
- Schedule: Irregular
- Format: Limited series
- Publication date: 2010
- No. of issues: 1

Creative team
- Written by: Justin Gray; Jimmy Palmiotti
- Artist(s): Giancarlo Caracuzzo; Paul Mounts

Random Acts of Violence is the one shot graphic novel from Image Comics by writer Justin Gray and Jimmy Palmiotti, and artists Giancarlo Caracuzzo and Paul Mounts in 2010.

== Plot ==
The story focuses on comic book creators Ezra and Todd and their first major published work, a horror character called Slasherman. Success starts flowing like a river, but when that river turns bloody and people start dying in the midst of a signing tour, it becomes clear that Ezra and Todd's creation has taken on a life of its own.

== Film adaptation ==
Writing partners Jay Baruchel and Jesse Chabot were hired by Kickstart Comics to write the film adaptation in May 2011. Jimmy Palmiotti praised the hiring, and also said that "having Baruchel also star in it would be a super bonus." By August 2018, principal photography had begun in Toronto and lasted until September 2018. The film debuted at the 2019 Fantastic Fest on September 19, 2019, by Elevation Pictures, who released the film in Canada on July 31, 2020, before debuting it on Shudder in the United States on August 20, 2020.
