= Kim Coates =

Canadian-American actor (born 1958)

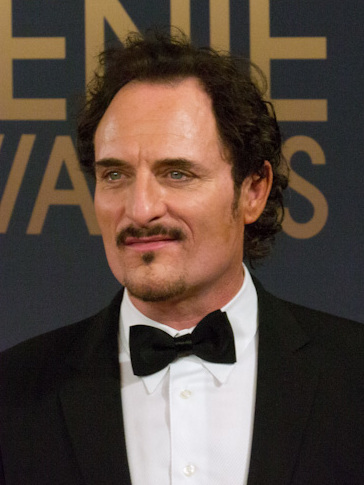
- Coates in 2012
- Born: February 21, 1958 (age 68); Saskatoon, Saskatchewan, Canada
- Citizenship: Canada; United States (since 2010)
- Education: University of Saskatchewan
- Occupation: Actor
- Years active: 1985–present
- Spouse: Diana Chappell (m. 1984)
- Children: 2

Kim Frederick Coates (born February 21, 1958) is a Canadian and American actor and producer. He is known for his starring roles as Alexander "Tig" Trager on the FX television series Sons of Anarchy (2008–14) and as Declan Gardiner on the Citytv series Bad Blood (2017–18). He has also had notable roles on Prison Break, CSI: Miami, Ghost Wars, Godless, Van Helsing, and as Brigham Young on American Primeval, and played Ronnie Hortense in the cult hockey comedy Goon (2011) and its sequel Goon: Last of the Enforcers (2017).

Coates has been nominated for five Canadian Screen Awards, winning Best Actor in a Continuing Leading Dramatic Role for Bad Blood. He won a Dora Mavor Moore Award for Outstanding Performance by a Male in a Principal Role – Play for his role in Jez Butterworth's play Jerusalem.

== Early life and education ==
Coates was born in Saskatoon, Saskatchewan, Canada, to Frederick and Joyce Coates. He first saw a play while attending the University of Saskatchewan, where he enrolled in a drama course as an elective. This experience inspired him to pursue an acting career.

== Career ==
=== Theatre ===
Coates joined the Stratford Festival during its 1985–86 season and, at 28 years old, was the youngest-ever actor to play the title character in Macbeth at the festival. He made his Broadway debut as Stanley Kowalski in the 1988 revival of A Streetcar Named Desire. In 1989, he starred in Les Liaisons Dangereuses at the Actors Theatre of Louisville.

In 2018 he had his first stage role in almost thirty years, playing Johnny "Rooster" Byron in the Outside the March production of Jez Butterworth's play Jerusalem. He won the Dora Mavor Moore Award for Outstanding Performance by a Male in a Principal Role – Play at the 2018 Dora Awards.

=== Film and television ===
Coates has appeared in over 100 film and television titles to date. He made his screen acting debut in the Canadian sports biopic The Boy in Blue (1986). He appeared in a number of Canadian TV shows and films before making his Hollywood debut as a memorable henchman in the Bruce Willis-Damon Wayans action comedy The Last Boy Scout (1991).

He appeared in the films Innocent Blood (1992), The Client (1994), Waterworld (1995), Bad Boys (1995), Battlefield Earth (2000), Pearl Harbor (2001), Black Hawk Down (2001), Open Range (2003), Assault on Precinct 13 (2005), The Island (2005), Silent Hill (2006), Resident Evil: Afterlife (2010), Goon (2011), Goon: Last of the Enforcers (2016), and Fantasy Island (2020).

Coates starred as Alexander "Tig" Trager in the FX crime drama series Sons of Anarchy (2008-14). He also appeared in the television series Prison Break, CSI: Miami, Ghost Wars, Godless, Van Helsing, and American Primeval.

At the 7th Canadian Screen Awards, Coates won the award for Best Actor in a Continuing Leading Dramatic Role for his performance as gangster Declan Gardiner in the television series Bad Blood, and was also nominated for Best Dramatic Series. He was previously nominated for two Gemini Awards.

In 2024, Coates joined the cast of The Walking Dead: Dead City's second season as Bruegel, the leader of his own gang, the Silk Stockings. Coates' performance was critically acclaimed, with some deeming him as one of the best villains The Walking Dead has ever had.

Coates played a supporting role with Kevin James in the 2026 romantic comedy film Solo Mio.

== Honours ==
On June 6, 2017, Coates received an honorary doctorate at the University of Saskatchewan. He received the Queen Elizabeth II Platinum Jubilee Medal (Saskatchewan) on March 28, 2023.

== Philanthropy ==
Coates supports the One Heart Source, a non profit organization aiming at ending poverty by designing high quality global initiatives focused on education and health.

Coates participates in Rally for Kids events in support for The Pinball Clemons Foundation.

== Personal life ==
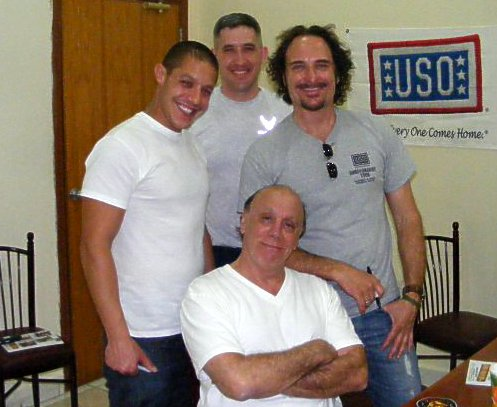
Coates (right) joins Theo Rossi and Dayton Callie on a USO visit to Southwest Asia.

Coates splits his time between Los Angeles and Toronto. He lives with his wife and two children. He is known to be good friends with Prison Break co-star William Fichtner, as well as Kevin Costner and Sons of Anarchy co-star Theo Rossi.

Coates is a dual citizen of Canada and the United States; he received his American citizenship in 2010.

== Stage credits ==
Year	Title	Role	Venue	Notes
1985	The Two Noble Kinsmen	Theseus	Festival Theatre, Stratford	
1986	Shakespeare's Lovers	Mercutio	Festival Theatre, Stratford	
1986	Macbeth	Macbeth / Macduff / Bleeding Sergeant	Festival Theatre, Stratford	Alternating performances
1987	The Passion of Dracula	Count Dracula	Alliance Theatre, Atlanta	
1988	A Streetcar Named Desire	Stanley Kowalski	Circle in the Square Theatre, New York	Standby
1989	Les Liaisons Dangereuses	Vicomte de Valmont	Actors Theatre of Louisville, Louisville	
2018	Jerusalem	Johnny "Rooster" Byron	Crow's Theatre, Toronto	

== Filmography ==
=== Film ===
Year	Title	Role	Notes
1986	The Boy in Blue	McCoy Man #2	
1987	Last Man Standing	Mr. Regan	
1988	Palais Royale	Tony DiCarlo	
1989	Cold Front	Mantha	
1989	Blind Fear	Ed	
1990	The Amityville Curse	Frank	
1990	Red Blooded American Girl	Dennis	
1991	The Last Boy Scout	Chet	
1992	Under Cover of Darkness	Ray Murdoch	
1992	Innocent Blood	Ray	
1993	Harmony Cats	Graham Braithwaite	
1994	The Club	Mr. Carver	
1994	The Client	Paul Gronke	
1995	Waterworld	The Drifter	
1995	Bad Boys	White Carjacker	
1995	Breach of Trust	Palmer Davis	
1996	Unforgettable	Eddie Dutton	
1996	Carpool	Lieutenant Erdman	
1997	Lethal Tender	Montessi	
1998	Airborne	Bob Murdoch	
1999	Killing Moon	Clayton Durrell	
2000	Battlefield Earth	Carlo	
2000	Auggie Rose	Auggie Rose	
2000	Ghost Hunter D	Ghost Hunter X	
2000	XChange	Toffler / Fisk 2	
2001	Pearl Harbor	Jack Richards	
2001	Black Hawk Down	MSG Tim "Griz" Martin	
2001	Full Disclosure	Dave Lewis	
2002	Tunnel	Geary	
2003	Hollywood North	Scott DiMarco	
2003	Open Range	Butler	
2004	Unstoppable	Peterson	
2004	Bandido	Beno	
2004	Caught in the Headlights	Harry Eden	
2005	Assault on Precinct 13	Deputy Rosen	
2005	Hostage	The Watchman	
2005	The Island	Charles Whitman	
2006	Silent Hill	Officer Thomas Gucci	
2006	King of Sorrow	Steve Serrano	
2006	Skinwalkers	Zo	
2006	Grilled	Tony	
2007	The Poet	General Koenig	
2007	Alien Agent	Carl Roderick	
2007	Late Fragment	Hank	
2008	Hero Wanted	Skinner McGraw	
2008	45 R.P.M.	Constable Able Taft	
2010	Blood: A Butcher's Tale	Andris	
2010	Sinners & Saints	Detective Dave Besson	
2010	A Little Help	Mel Kaminsky	
2010	Resident Evil: Afterlife	Bennett Sinclair	
2011	Sacrifice	Arment	
2011	Goon	Ronnie Hortense	
2012	A Dark Truth	Bruce Swinton	
2012	Rufus	Aaron Van Dusen	
2013	Robosapien: Rebooted	Porter	
2014	Last Days Here	Bobby Liebling	
2014	A Fighting Man	Father Brennan	
2014	Mutant World	Marcus King	
2016	The Land	Uncle Steve	
2016	Strange Weather	Clayton Watson	
2016	Officer Downe	Officer Downe	
2016	Stagecoach: The Texas Jack Story	Marshall / Woody Calhoun	
2016	True Memoirs of an International Assassin	President Cueto	
2016	The Adventure Club	Ozzie	
2016	Goon: Last of the Enforcers	Ronnie Hortense	
2016	Bodyguards: Secret Lives from the Watchtower	The Narrator	
2018	Cold Brook	George Hildebrandt	
2020	Fantasy Island	Devil Face	
2021	See for Me	Rico	
2021	Donkeyhead	Brent Maloney	
2022	Double Down South	Nick	
2026	Solo Mio	Julian	
2026	Remnant	Nikolai	

=== Television ===
Year	Title	Role	Notes
1987	Miami Vice	Gang Member	Episode: "Viking Bikers from Hell"
1988	Katts and Dog	Garrett	Episode: "Birds of a Feather"
1988	War of the Worlds	Scott	Episode: "To Heal the Leper"
1991	Counterstrike	Lance	Episode: "Survival Instinct"
1992	Scales of Justice	George Pappajohn	Episode "Regina v Pappajohn"
1993	Dead Before Dawn	Zack	TV movie
1993	Street Justice	Joe Cannon	Episode: "On My Honor"
1993	Counterstrike	Michael	Episode: "Muerte"
1993	Kung Fu: The Legend Continues	Marty Stramm	Episode: "Force of Habit"
1994	I Know My Son Is Alive	Detective Griffi	TV movie
1994	RoboCop	Tim Malloy	Episode: "The Tin Man"
1995	The Shamrock Conspiracy	Sean Nolan	TV movie
1995	Black Fox: Good Men and Bad	Natchez John Dunn	TV miniseries
1995–2002	The Outer Limits	Colonel Sage / Dave Stockley	2 episodes
1996	Kung Fu: The Legend Continues	Salitin	Episode: "Time Prisoners"
1997	Dead Silence	Ted Handy	TV movie
1997	Poltergeist: The Legacy	Steven Romero	Episode: "Transference"
1997	Married to a Stranger	Dr. Jesse Bethan	TV movie
1998–99	Night Man	Kieran Keyes	6 episodes
1999	Total Recall 2070	Rogue Android	2 episodes
2000	Killing Moon	Clayton Durrell	TV movie
2002	Earth: Final Conflict	"Smoke" McBride	Episode: "Deportation"
2002	The Scream Team	Zachariah Kull	TV movie
2003	Thoughtcrimes	Lars Etsen	TV movie
2004	CSI: Crime Scene Investigation	Drake Snow	Episode: "Early Rollout"
2005	A Friend of the Family	David Snow	TV movie
2005	CSI: NY	Detective Vicaro	Episode: "Hush"
2005	Hercules	Tiresias	TV movie
2006	12 Hours to Live	Jack Bryant	TV movie
2006–09	Prison Break	Richard Sullins	6 episodes
2007	Smallville	Special Agent Carter	3 episodes
2007	The Dresden Files	Sirota	Episode: "Rules of Engagement"
2008	Cold Case	Alessandro Rossilini	Episode: "Sabotage"
2008	A Gunfighter's Pledge	Tate	TV movie
2008–11	Entourage	Carl Ertz	2 episodes
2008–09	CSI: Miami	Ron Saris	6 episodes
2008–14	Sons of Anarchy	Alexander "Tig" Trager	Main role
2010	Human Target	Bertram	Episode: "Salvage & Reclamation"
2013	Crossing Lines	Genovese	5 episodes
2017	Godless	Ed Logan	TV Miniseries (5 episodes)
2017	Kevin Can Wait	Terry Labasco	Episode: "Unholy War"
2017–18	Ghost Wars	Billy McGrath	Main role
2017–18	Bad Blood	Declan Gardiner	Main role
2019–20	Rapunzel's Tangled Adventure	Hector (voice)	2 episodes
2021	The Crew	Rob Walton	Episode: "My Name's Kevin And I Care About Feelings"
2021	Pretty Hard Cases	Bill Misiano	5 episodes
2021	Van Helsing	Count Dalibor	Main role (season 5)
2021	Corner Gas Animated	Biker (voice)	Episode: "Plots and Plans"
2022	Mayans M.C.	Alexander "Tig" Trager	Episode: "When the Breakdown Hit at Midnight"
2023	White House Plumbers	Frank Sturgis	5 episodes
2025	American Primeval	Brigham Young	4 episodes
2025	The Walking Dead: Dead City	Bruegel	5 episodes
2026	Anna Pigeon	Jeremiah Paulson	Regular role

== Awards and nominations ==
Award	Year	Category	Work	Outcome
Canadian Screen Award	2013	Best Supporting Actor	Goon	Nominated
Canadian Screen Award	2018	Best Actor in a Continuing Leading Dramatic Role	Bad Blood	Nominated
Canadian Screen Award	2019	Best Actor in a Continuing Leading Dramatic Role	Bad Blood	Won
Canadian Screen Award	2019	Best Dramatic Series	Bad Blood	Nominated
Canadian Screen Award	2022	Best Guest Performance in a Comedy Series	Pretty Hard Cases	Nominated
Dora Mavor Moore Award	2018	Outstanding Performance by a Male in a Principal Role – Play	Jerusalem	Won
Gemini Award	1998	Best Guest Performance in a Dramatic Series	Poltergeist: The Legacy ("Transference")	Nominated
Gemini Award	1998	Best Supporting Actor in a Drama Program or Series	Dead Silence	Nominated
Leo Award	2022	Best Supporting Male Performance in a Motion Picture	Donkeyhead	Nominated
PAAFTJ Television Award	2013	Best Cast in a Drama Series	Sons of Anarchy	Nominated
