= Random Acts of Violence (film) =

2019 film by Jay Baruchel

- Theatrical release poster
- Directed by: Jay Baruchel
- Written by: Jay Baruchel; Jesse Chabot
- Based on: Random Acts of Violence by: Justin Gray; Jimmy Palmiotti; Giancarlo Caracuzzo
- Produced by: Jay Baruchel; Randy Manis; Noah Segal
- Starring: Jesse Williams; Jordana Brewster; Jay Baruchel
- Cinematography: Karim Hussain
- Edited by: Andrew Gordon Macpherson
- Music by: Wade MacNeil; Andrew Gordon Macpherson
- Production companies: Elevation Pictures; SND Films; Wicked Rig; Manis Film; JoBro Productions; Kickstart Comics
- Distributed by: Telefilm Canada (Canada); Shudder (United States)
- Release dates: September 19, 2019 (Fantastic Fest); July 31, 2020 (Canada); August 20, 2020 (United States)
- Running time: 80 minutes
- Countries: Canada; United States
- Language: English
- Budget: $3.5 million

Random Acts of Violence is a 2019 slasher film directed and produced by Jay Baruchel, who wrote the screenplay with Jesse Chabot. An adaptation of the 2010 graphic novel, the film follows a comic book creator (portrayed by Jesse Williams) whose works are used as inspiration for a string of real-life murders. Jordana Brewster and Baruchel also star.

The film entered development in 2011 when Baruchel and Chabot were first hired to adapt the screenplay. Attempts to begin production failed several times in subsequent years; principal photography took place between August 2018 and September 2018.

Random Acts of Violence debuted at the 2019 Fantastic Fest, and was released theatrically by Telefilm Canada in Canada on July 31, 2020, followed by a release in the United States on August 20 via streaming by Shudder. The film received mixed reviews from critics, who were polarized over the film's message but generally praised the special effects and gore.

== Premise ==
Todd Walkley and his publisher Ezra made their careers crafting a comic book based on a real-life serial killer called Slasherman. On a press tour to announce the launch of their final issue, they visit the town where Slasherman wreaked havoc twenty years earlier. Upon their arrival, a series of new murders unfold… murders that look eerily familiar to imagery in Todd's Slasherman comics. Speculation and paranoia build regarding the identity of the mysterious killer.

— Elevation Pictures

== Cast ==
- Jesse Williams as Todd Walkley, a comic book writer and the creator of Slasherman. Isaiah Rockcliffe portrays young Todd.
- Jordana Brewster as Kathy, Todd's girlfriend.
- Jay Baruchel as Ezra, Todd's best friend and the owner of Hard Calibre Comics.
- Simon Northwood as The Man
- Niamh Wilson as Aurora, Todd's assistant.
- Clark Backo as Todd's mother
- Victoria Snow as Borden
- Eric Osborne as Adam
- Nia Roam as Megan
- Aviva Mongillo as Hannah
- Wade MacNeil as Gary Reston

== Production ==
=== Development ===
Writing partners Jay Baruchel and Jesse Chabot were provided a copy of the one-shot comic Random Acts of Violence in 2010. They met with publisher Kickstart Comics about a separate project, and were later hired to write the film adaptation in May 2011. Comic co-writer Jimmy Palmiotti praised the hiring, and also said that "having [Baruchel] also star in it would be a super bonus", suggesting him for either of the lead roles.

The project was not discussed publicly again until a January 2015 interview, where Baruchel revealed that financing and casting had been completed and that he was attempting to film the project that year. He also said that he "might get to direct that this year as well" and announced various crew members, including editor Jason Eisener, cinematographer Bobby Shore, make-up artist Paul Jones, and composer Matthew Good. In a 2019 interview, Baruchel credited Eisener for pushing him to direct the film.

=== Filming ===
In July 2018, Jesse Williams, Jordana Brewster, and Niamh Wilson were announced to lead the cast. Williams was cast as Todd Walkley, the creator of the fictional comic character Slasherman. Brewster will portray his girlfriend Kathy, Wilson will play his assistant Aurora, and Baruchel was also confirmed to be starring as Todd's best friend Ezra. By August 2018, principal photography had begun in Toronto and lasted until September 2018. According to Baruchel, filming lasted for "technically 20, but really 19 days" and included shoots in Hamilton, Ontario.

=== Post-production ===
By October 2018, Baruchel was working on editing the film, balancing his time between an editing suite set up in his basement and promotion of How to Train Your Dragon: The Hidden World (2019). In a February 2019 interview, Baruchel gave more insight on the film by stating, "We're trying our best to give the world something interesting and unique and legitimately scary. So it goes very hard and hopefully, if we've done our jobs, it'll have something to say about the genre itself. It's a horror flick that has as much of a brain as a set of fangs to it. I think it should f**k people up, but also leave them thinking about a bunch of sh*t – that's the goal." In a May 2019 interview, Baruchel said "[he is] currently in post-production on the film; hopefully its scary and ruins people's ability to dream normally." Post-production concluded on August 13, 2019.

== Release ==
Random Acts of Violence premiered at the 2019 Fantastic Fest on September 19, 2019. Elevation Pictures released the film in Canada on July 31, 2020, before debuting it on Shudder in the United States on August 20, 2020.

=== Reception ===
On review aggregator website Rotten Tomatoes, the film holds an approval rating of 58% based on 78 reviews, and an average rating of 5.8/10. The website's critics consensus reads, "Random Acts of Violence falls short as an intelligent analysis of its themes, but viewers looking for chance instances of brutality won't be let down." At Metacritic, the film has a weighted average score of 39 out of 100, based on eight critics, indicating "generally unfavorable reviews".

After its premiere at the 2019 Fantastic Fest, the film garnered positive reviews. Hazem Fahmy, of Film Inquiry, praised "the timely message" and the way the film delivers its central theme. Amelia Emberwing, of Birth.Movies.Death., praised the film as "quick, bloody and brimming with some genuinely solid special effects". Matthew Monagle, of The Playlist, gave the film a grade B−, also praising the violence and the film's commentary on the media. Michael Gingold, of Rue Morgue, praised the film's "potent meta look at the genre".

Conversely, Chris Knight, of National Post, gave a negative review, criticizing the violence and "the lack of humor". Roger Moore, of Movie Nation, also gave a negative review, criticizing the film for "not doing much more than stumble and angst-out from one killing to the next". Josh Bell, of Comic Book Resources, felt that the film "seems contemptuous of horror fans". Cath Clarke, of The Guardian, described it as an "exasperating serial killer-slasher". Brian Tallerico, of RogerEbert.com, took issue with the film thinking "it's saying something about gratuitous violence and exploitation of real tragedy but is even more hypocritically hollow than the films it purports to criticize".
