= TJ Dawe =

Ti-Jon David "TJ" Dawe (born August 22, 1974) is a Canadian playwright and director.

== Early life ==
Dawe was born in Vancouver, British Columbia. He studied theatre at the University of Victoria, graduating with a Bachelor of Fine Arts in 1997.

== Career ==
Dawe has worked extensively in fringe theatre festivals in Canada and the US. Other festival appearances include the Montreal Just for Laughs Festival, Piccolo Spoleto, the Edinburgh Fringe and the Adelaide Fringe. He wrote and performed the monologues Tired Cliches, Labrador, The Slipknot, Tracks (adapted from Jack London's memoir The Road), A Canadian Bartender at Butlin's, The Curse of the Trickster, Maxim and Cosmo, Totem Figures, Lucky 9, Medicine, Marathon, Burn Job, Roller Coaster and Operatic Panic Attack. He co-wrote the plays 52 Pick-up (with Rita Bozi), Toothpaste and Cigars (with Mike Rinaldi), The Power of Ignorance (with Chris Gibbs), and Dishpig (with Greg Landucci). He adapted The Doctor is Sick from the novel by Anthony Burgess. He dramaturged and/or directed many one person shows, including The One Man Star Wars Trilogy, One Man Lord of the Rings, One Man Dark Knight: A Batman Parody, Teaching As You Like It, Teaching the Fringe, Rant Demon, Local Celebrity, Mr Fox, The Big Oops, Sev, Elephant, Never Shoot a Stampede Queen, Greener Than Thou, Bookworm, The Great Canadian Tire Money Caper, Richard Lett: Sober But Never Clean, Richard Lett: One Nut Only, Ten Tips for a Collapsed Uterus, The Mirror Test, Tragedy + Time Served = Comedy, Not Enough, Periscope, Awkward Hug, Razor and Didn't Hurt.

He teaches a course on creating solo shows at Langara College in Vancouver.

A Canadian Bartender at Butlin's was broadcast on Bravo Canada and CBC Radio. The Slipknot, Labrador, and The Power of Ignorance have been published by Brindle and Glass, as well as a Power of Ignorance humor book (also co-written with Chris Gibbs). Toothpaste and Cigars, A Canadian Bartender at Butlin's, and Tracks were published by 13th Tiger Press. Totem Figures was published in the Winter 2010 issue of Canadian Theatre Review, and has been used as the text in an English class at Stetson University in DeLand, Florida.

Dawe has written extensively for the group ideas blog BeamsandStruts.com, and delivered a talk at TEDx Manitoba on the subject in February 2012. He has also released numerous podcasts on the subject of personal influence (Totem Figures).

Dawe co-created, directed and performed in PostSecret: the Show, a stage adaptation of the blog PostSecret, co-created by founder Frank Warren, Justin Sudds and Kahlil Ashanti. PostSecret: the Show was workshopped in Vancouver, Silver Spring, MD, Saginaw, MI and Cincinnati, OH. It debuted at the Blumenthal Centre for the Performing Arts in Charlotte, North Carolina, in April 2014, and has done two US tours, in 2016 and 2018.

Dawe directed Musical Thrones: a Parody of Ice and Fire which toured the US in 2018.

His show Medicine chronicles his experiences with Dr. Gabor Mate and the psychotropic shamanic plant medicine ayahuasca. He has been joined onstage by Dr. Mate for talkbacks after some performances. A recording of the show and some talkbacks can be found on YouTube.

His play Toothpaste and Cigars (co-written with Mike Rinaldi) was adapted into the feature film The F Word (2013), directed by Michael Dowse, starring Daniel Radcliffe and Zoe Kazan. Dawe and Rinaldi have also written historical comedies for the Wildhorse Theatre in Fort Steele, a spoof history of the city of Vancouver, and the Christmas play Old Nick for the Caravan Farm Theatre.

He maintains a strong interest in the Enneagram of Personality, earning his teacher's certification from the Enneagram Institute. He gave the closing address at the International Enneagram Association's conference in Cincinnati, July 2018, titled Star Wars and the Kingdom of Heaven.
