= Elan Mastai =

Canadian screenwriter and novelist

- Born: Vancouver, British Columbia, Canada
- Occupations: writer, producer
- Writing career
- Genres: screenwriting, novels
- Notable works: The F Word (screenplay), All Our Wrong Todays (novel)
- Website: elanmastai.com

Elan Mastai is a Canadian screenwriter and novelist. He is best known for The F Word, for which he won the Canadian Screen Award for Best Adapted Screenplay at the 2nd Canadian Screen Awards in 2014.

His other screenwriting credits include MVP: Most Vertical Primate and Fury. He has described The F Word as the first time he wrote a screenplay in his own voice, rather than to the commercial demands of a mass-audience film.

He was born and raised in Vancouver, British Columbia, to a Canadian mother and an Israeli immigrant father. Both his parents are Jewish, and they met in Jerusalem. He studied film at Queen's University and Concordia University.

In 2015, Mastai secured a $1.25 million deal for his debut novel, All Our Wrong Todays. A science fiction novel, the book concerns a man from an alternate history utopia who, while part of a time travel experiment, causes a drastic alteration of his history, and regains consciousness in our society. The novel was published on February 7, 2017. In 2017 he was described as working on a screenplay for All Our Wrong Todays, and working on a second novel.

Mastai was the supervising producer and staff writer of NBC's This Is Us.
