= The Samaritan =

Film by David Weaver

- DVD cover
- Directed by: David Weaver
- Written by: David Weaver; Elan Mastai
- Produced by: Elan Mastai; Andras Hamori; Suzanne Cheriton; Tony Wosk
- Starring: Samuel L. Jackson; Luke Kirby; Ruth Negga; Tom Wilkinson; Gil Bellows; Aaron Poole
- Cinematography: François Dagenais
- Edited by: Geoff Ashenhurst
- Music by: Todor Kobakov
- Distributed by: H2O Motion Pictures EntertainmentOne
- Release dates: March 3, 2012 (Kingston Canadian Film Festival); May 18, 2012 (Canada)
- Running time: 90 minutes
- Country: Canada
- Language: English

The Samaritan, known as Fury in the United Kingdom, is a 2012 Canadian crime drama film co-written and directed by David Weaver, and starring Samuel L. Jackson. A trailer was released on its website.

== Plot ==
Foley gets out of prison after 25 years, for killing his best friend and grifting partner. His partner's son, Ethan, takes him to Xavier's nightclub and tries to recruit him into a grift he's planning, and Foley turns it down, saying he wants to go straight. Ethan goes to the kitchen area where Xavier is dealing with someone who has been caught stealing from him. Xavier leaves it with Ethan to recover the stolen money.

When his initial efforts fail, Ethan sets in motion a plan that leads Foley to come to the aid of Iris, a young addict being harassed in a bar. Foley and Iris eventually enter into a relationship, and she reveals that she is in financial debt to Ethan.

After Foley and Iris have started sleeping together, Ethan reveals to Foley that Iris is his daughter. He uses her as leverage to force Foley to do the job. Ethan has sent Jake to Iris's apartment to kill her, and Foley races to save her. Foley sends a battered Jake back to Xavier.

Foley visits Iris's grandmother who confirms Iris's identity and is sickened by the unintended incest.

The grift is put into place, and it's revealed that Xavier is the mark.

Foley's female accomplice is found hanging having committed suicide, Iris takes her place in the scam.

During the grift to con Xavier out of $8 million, and after a series of altercations between Foley, Xavier, Ethan and Iris, Iris is wounded by Ethan, and she reveals that she had eventually deduced that Foley is her father. Ethan is shot and wounded, Xavier tries to escape but is killed by Foley. Foley returns to Iris who is again shot and mortally wounded by Ethan, Foley then kills Ethan. Foley rushes away to a doctor with his daughter who is desperate for a blood transfusion to save her life. Foley volunteers as he is a compatible blood type, but dies during the procedure. Iris flees to a far away land, she visits a bank and checks that the money from the grift is in her account.

== Cast ==
- Samuel L. Jackson as Foley
- Luke Kirby as Ethan
- Ruth Negga as Iris
- Deborah Kara Unger as Helena
- Martha Burns as Gretchen
- Alan C. Peterson as Miro
- Aaron Poole as Jake
- Tom McCamus as Deacon
- Tom Wilkinson as Xavier
- Gil Bellows as Bartender Bill

== Release ==
DVD cover with the UK title Fury

The film was released as Fury on April 20, 2012 in the United Kingdom. The film was released as The Samaritan in a "pre-theatrical release" through Time Warner Cable's on-demand channel.

== Reception ==
Roger Ebert gave it three stars out of four saying "One difference between film noir and more straightforward crime pictures is that noir is more open to human flaws and likes to embed them in twisty plot lines. "The Samaritan" isn't a great noir, but it's true to the tradition and gives Samuel L. Jackson one of his best recent roles."

The Hollywood Reporter similarly praised the film saying "A rock solid Samuel L. Jackson adeptly anchors the twists and turns of this noir crime thriller."

Despite these top critic reviews, on Rotten Tomatoes, the film has an approval rating of 26% based on 35 reviews, with an average rating of 4.3/10. The site's consensus reads, "The Samaritan is a ludicrous neo-noir starring a seemingly bored Samuel L. Jackson." On Metacritic, the film has a weighted average score of 37 out of 100, based on 15 critics, indicating "generally unfavorable reviews".

== See also ==
- Oldboy, 2013 film with a similar reveal
- An Awfully Big Adventure, a 1995 film with a similar reveal
