= Marc-André Grondin =

Canadian actor

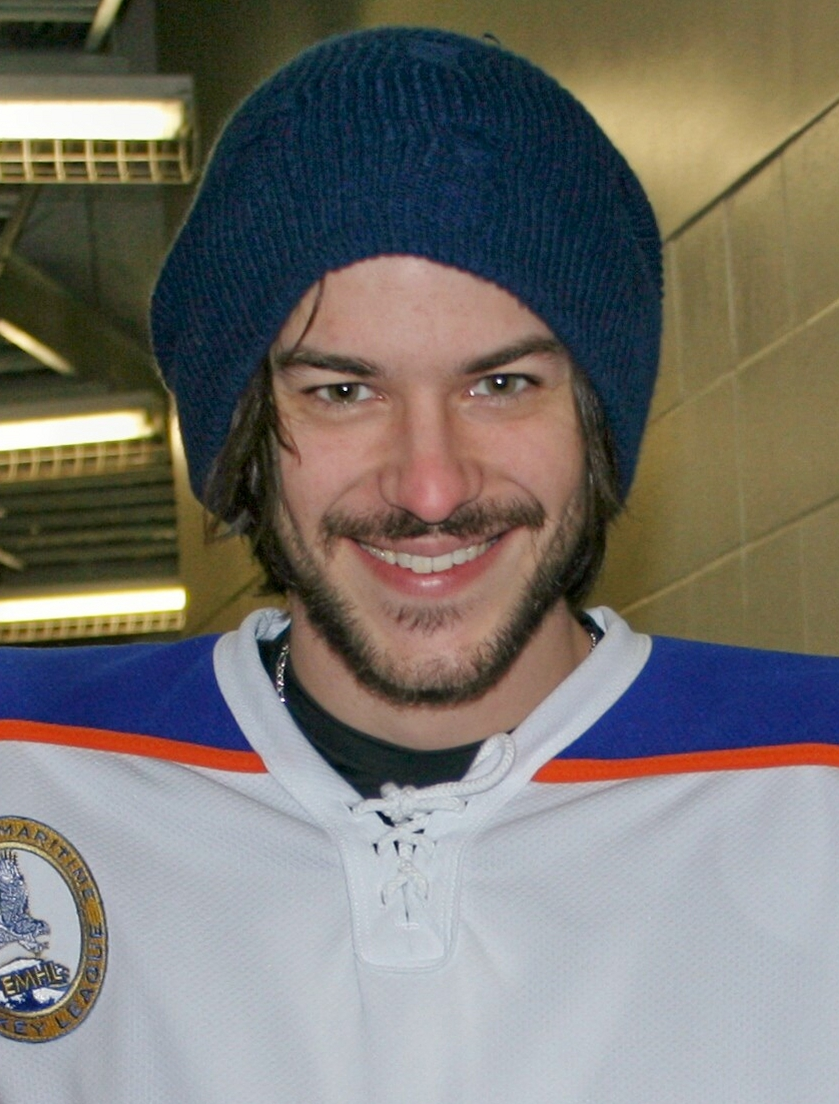
- Grondin in November 2010
- Born: March 11, 1984 (age 42); Montreal, Quebec, Canada
- Occupation: Actor
- Years active: 1989–present
- Children: 4

Marc-André Grondin (born March 11, 1984) is a Canadian actor, known for his role as Xavier Laflamme in the 2011 ice hockey film Goon. He also played Zachary Beaulieu in Jean-Marc Vallée's film C.R.A.Z.Y. (2005), for which he won a Jutra Award for best actor.

== Early life ==
Marc-André Grondin was born March 11, 1984 in Montreal, Quebec.

== Career ==
Grondin is known for his work in the film Les fleurs magiques, La belle bête, 5150 Elm's Way, Che and the television series Les super mamies, Sous un ciel variable and Nos étés. Grondin received a César in 2009 for his performance as Raphael in Le Premier Jour du Reste de ta Vie directed by Rémi Bezançon.

He played Frederic Bourdin, a French serial impostor, in the 2010 film The Chameleon, as well as French-Canadian hockey player Xavier LaFlamme in Goon (2011).

He was nominated for Best Actor at the 8th Canadian Screen Awards for his performance in Mafia Inc.

In other work, Grondin has served as a judge at the 2010 Festival du Nouveau Cinéma awards.

== Personal life ==
Marc-André Grondin is in a relationship with actress Sarah-Jeanne Labrosse. The couple have two children, born in 2022 and 2023. Grondin is also the father of a child born during a previous relationship.

== Filmography ==
=== Film ===
Year	Title	Role	Notes
1991	Nelligan	Child (cathedral)	
1992	Ma sœur, mon amour	Gaétan (child) / Jérôme	
1992	La fenêtre	Alain	
1994	La fête des rois	Benjamin	
1995	Magical Flowers	DJ	French: Les fleurs magiques; Short film
2005	C.R.A.Z.Y.	Zachary Beaulieu (age 15 to 21)	
2006	The Beautiful Beast	Patrice	French: La Belle bête
2008	Che: Part Two	Régis Debray	
2008	The First Day of the Rest of Your Life	Raphaël Duval	
2008	Bouquet final	Gabriel	
2009	5150 Elm's Way	Yannick Bérubé	French: 5150, rue des Ormes
2010	Bus Palladium	Lucas	
2010	The Chameleon	Frédéric Fortin / Nicholas Mark Randall	
2010	Insoupçonnable	Sam	
2011	Mike	Mike	
2011	Goon	Xavier LaFlamme	
2011	The Happiness of Others	Sylvain	French: Le Bonheur des autres
2012	The Man Who Laughs	Gwynplaine	French: L'Homme qui rit
2012	L'Affaire Dumont	Michel Dumont	
2013	Vic and Flo Saw a Bear	Guillaume Perreira-Leduc	French: Vic+Flo ont vu un ours
2013	The End of Pinky	French narration	Short film
2014	You're Sleeping Nicole	Rémi Gagnon	French: Tu dors Nicole
2015	After the Ball	Daniel	
2015	April and the Extraordinary World	Julius (voice)	French: Avril et le Monde truqué
2017	Goon: Last of the Enforcers	Xavier LaFlamme	
2017	Ravenous	Bonin	French: Les Affamés
2019	Mafia Inc.	Vincent "Vince" Gamache	
2020	The Decline	François	French: Jusqu'au déclin
2022	Very Nice Day		French: Très belle journée
2023	Richelieu	Stéphane	
2023	The Successor	Ellias	French: Le Successeur
2024	Mercenaire	David	Short film

=== Television ===
Year	Title	Role	Notes
1989	Un signe de feu	Guillaume Poliquin	
1993	The Intrepids	Nellito	
1993	Au nom du père et du fils	Jérôme Villeneuve	Season 1, episode 6
1995	Sous un ciel variable	Simon Egger-Tanguay	
2002	Les super mamies	Martin Lafond-Cloutier	
2003	Watatatow	Karl Godin	
2006	Nos étés	André-Jules Belzile	4 episodes
2007	Les Cerfs-volants	Ludo	Television film
2014	Sensitive Skin	Greg	2 episodes
2015	Spotless	Jean Bastière	Main role
2016–2017	L'Imposteur	Philippe Bouchard	Main role
2019	Les Invisibles	Marc-André Grondin	Episode: "Jeux de trahison"
2019	Fragile	Félix Bachand	Miniseries; 10 episodes
2021	Club Soly	Participation spéciale	Episode: "Gastronomie et citoyenneté"
2021–2024	Doute raisonnable	Frédéric Masson	Main role
2022	Bye-Bye		Episode: "Bye-Bye 2022"
2024	IXE-13 et la course à l'uranium	IXE-13 / Jean Thibault	8 episodes
2024	Bellefleur	Yann	10 episodes

== Awards and nominations ==
Year	Award	Category	Work	Result
2006	Vancouver Film Critics Circle Awards 2006	Best Actor in a Canadian Film	C.R.A.Z.Y.	Won
2006	26th Genie Awards	Best Performance by an Actor in a Leading Role	C.R.A.Z.Y.	Nominated
2006	8th Jutra Awards	Best Actor	C.R.A.Z.Y.	Won
2009	34th César Awards	Most Promising Actor	The First Day of the Rest of Your Life	Won
2013	1st Canadian Screen Awards	Best Actor	L'Affaire Dumont	Nominated
2013	15th Jutra Awards	Best Actor	L'Affaire Dumont	Nominated
2015	Vancouver Film Critics Circle Awards 2015	Best Supporting Actor in a Canadian Film	You're Sleeping Nicole	Won
2015	3rd Canadian Screen Awards	Canadian Screen Award for Performance by an Actor in a Supporting Role	You're Sleeping Nicole	Nominated
2020	8th Canadian Screen Awards	Performance by an Actor in a Leading Role	Mafia Inc.	Nominated
2020	22nd Quebec Cinema Awards	Best Actor	Mafia Inc.	Nominated
2024	26th Quebec Cinema Awards	Best Actor	The Successor (Le Successeur)	Nominated
2024	26th Quebec Cinema Awards	Best Supporting Actor	Richelieu	Won
