= Alexandre Postel =

French writer (born 1982)

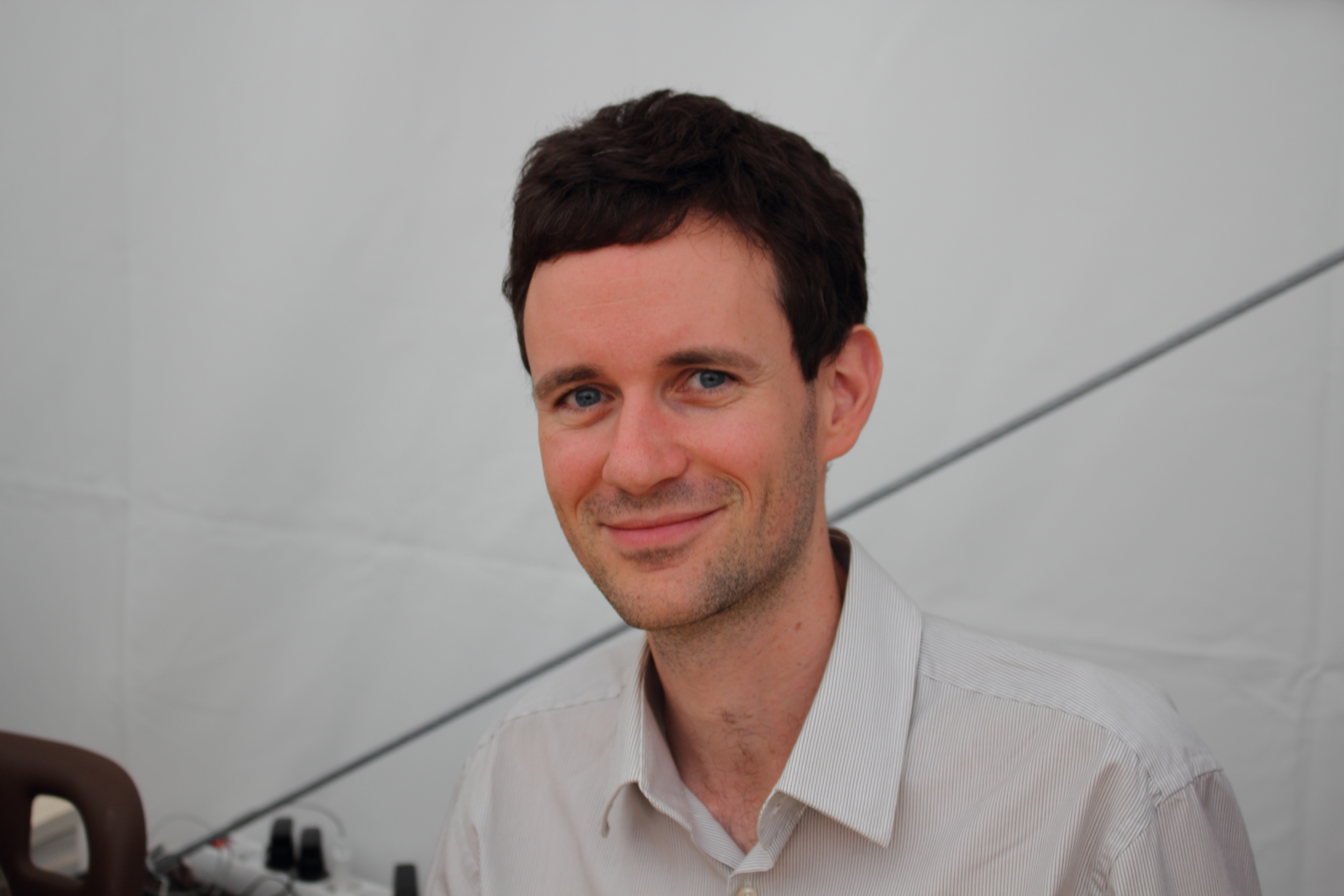
Image of Alexandre Postel

Alexandre Postel (born 29 April 1982 in Colombes, Paris) is a French writer.

In 2013 he was awarded the prix Landerneau as well as the Prix Goncourt du premier roman for Un homme effacé, published by éditions Gallimard.

A former student at the École normale supérieure de Lyon, Alexandre Postel is currently a professor of letters in classe préparatoire in Paris.

== Bibliography ==
- 2013: Un homme effacé, Gallimard, series "Blanche"
- 2015: L'Ascendant, Gallimard, series "Blanche"
- 2016: Les Deux Pigeons, Gallimard, series "Blanche"
