= Jesse Chabot =

Canadian screenwriter and producer

- Occupations: Screenwriter; Producer
- Years active: 2011–present
- Notable work: Goon: Last of the Enforcers; Random Acts of Violence

Jesse Chabot is a Canadian screenwriter and producer best known for his work on Goon: Last of the Enforcers and Random Acts of Violence.

== Career ==
Chabot began writing scripts for Goon: Last of the Enforcers (2017) and Random Acts of Violence (2019), both directed by Jay Baruchel. He was hired to co-write the scripts for Exorcism Diaries and Baseballissimo, alongside Baruchel.

== Filmography ==
Year	Title	Credited as		Notes
Year	Title	Writer	Producer	Notes
2011	Goon	No	Associate	
2014	Just for Laughs: All-Access	Yes	No	13 episodes
2017	Goon: Last of the Enforcers	Yes	Yes	
2019	Random Acts of Violence	Yes	No	
TBA	Exorcism Diaries	Yes	No	In development
TBA	Baseballissimo	Yes	No	In development
