= The F Word (2013 film) =

Film by Michael Dowse

- Theatrical release poster
- Directed by: Michael Dowse
- Screenplay by: Elan Mastai
- Based on: Toothpaste and Cigars by: TJ Dawe; Michael Rinaldi
- Produced by: David Gross; Macdara Kelleher; André Rouleau; Jesse Shapira; Jeff Arkuss
- Starring: Daniel Radcliffe; Zoe Kazan; Megan Park; Adam Driver; Mackenzie Davis; Rafe Spall
- Cinematography: Rogier Stoffers
- Edited by: Yvann Thibaudeau
- Music by: A. C. Newman
- Production companies: No Trace Camping; Caramel Film; Fastnet Films
- Distributed by: Entertainment One
- Release dates: 7 September 2013 (TIFF); 20 August 2014 (Ireland); 22 August 2014 (Canada)
- Running time: 102 minutes
- Countries: Canada; Ireland
- Language: English
- Budget: $11 million
- Box office: $9.8 million

The F Word (released in some countries as What If) is a 2013 romantic comedy film directed by Michael Dowse from a screenplay by Elan Mastai, based on the play Toothpaste and Cigars by TJ Dawe and Michael Rinaldi, starring Daniel Radcliffe, Zoe Kazan, Megan Park, Adam Driver, Mackenzie Davis, and Rafe Spall. It focuses on two young people (Radcliffe and Kazan) who meet for the first time and, since she has a boyfriend, decide to be "friends."

An international co-production between Canada and Ireland, The F Word premiered at the 2013 Toronto International Film Festival on September 7 and was released theatrically in Ireland on August 20, 2014, and in Canada on August 22. The film received several nominations at the 2nd Canadian Screen Awards, including Best Picture, and won Best Adapted Screenplay.

== Plot ==
Wallace is a young Englishman in Toronto, working a dead-end job and living with his sister and nephew. He dropped out of medical school a year earlier after catching his then-girlfriend making out with their professor and has since not been social. He is convinced to attend his best friend Allan's party, where he meets Allan's cousin Chantry. That same night, Allan meets Nicole, and they become enamored with one another.

Wallace and Chantry leave the party, and he walks her home, where he learns she has been in a relationship for years. Nevertheless, she gives him her phone number, but he decides against calling her. They later run into each other at a film theater and end up dining together. The two form an instant connection, discussing various topics, such as the Fool's Gold sandwich. They decide to become friends, and Wallace is soon invited to meet Chantry's boyfriend, Ben, a lawyer working for the United Nations. Ben winds up in the hospital after Wallace accidentally knocks him out of a window. At the hospital, Wallace and Chantry encounter Megan, his ex-girlfriend. Ben later moves to Dublin for six months for work, and Chantry continues her work as an animator. While Ben is gone, Wallace and Chantry's relationship continues to develop. Wallace struggles with his desire to tell Chantry how he feels, much to Allan's dismay.

Allan and Nicole get married. After the reception, Chantry's younger sister, Dalia, tries to seduce Wallace in her car, but he does not reciprocate. Later, Wallace and Chantry join Allan and Nicole for a bonfire on the beach, and they decide to go skinny dipping. Allan and Nicole steal their clothes, forcing them to sleep naked together in a single sleeping bag. Feeling forced into an uncomfortable, intimate situation, they express anger with their friends.

Feeling guilty, Chantry travels to Dublin to see Ben. She discovers Ben has accepted more work commitments that require him to travel frequently, and she decides to break up with him. Meanwhile, Wallace decides to go to Dublin to express his true feelings. He encounters Ben, who punches him in the face. He learns that Chantry has returned to Toronto and wants to meet. At a diner, Wallace tells Chantry about the trip and his feelings for her, and she responds unfavorably, informing him that she has accepted a work promotion and will be moving to Taiwan.

Heartbroken, Wallace considers returning to medical school and moving on with his life; however, he decides to attend Chantry's farewell party, and they have a tearful goodbye. They finally admit to their mutual feelings after gifting each other Fool's Gold, and they kiss.

Eighteen months later, Wallace and Chantry return home from Taiwan after becoming engaged. They marry and contemplate the rest of their lives while sitting on Wallace's rooftop.

== Cast ==
- Daniel Radcliffe as Wallace
- Zoe Kazan as Chantry
- Megan Park as Dalia
- Adam Driver as Allan
- Mackenzie Davis as Nicole
- Rafe Spall as Ben
- Jemima Rooper as Ellie
- Jordan Hayes as Becky
- Meghan Heffern as Tabby
- Jonathan Cherry as Josh
- Sarah Gadon as Megan
- Tommie-Amber Pirie as Gretchen
- Adam Fergus as Rolf
- Lucius Hoyos as Felix
- Rebecca Northan as Holly
- Oona Chaplin as Julianne
- Ennis Esmer as Paramedic

== Production ==
Elan Mastai's script was included in the Black List's 2008 survey. Principal photography began mid-August 2012, in Toronto. A six-week shoot occurred in Ontario, and ended with a three day shoot in Dublin, Ireland. The scene where Wallace runs into Chantry at a movie theater was filmed at the Royal Cinema. Most of the Toronto filming was within the East Chinatown, Leslieville and Riverdale districts; however, other downtown regions were used in Toronto and Scarborough. The scene where Wallace and Chantry skinny dip was filmed at the Scarborough Bluffs. Producer Michael Dowse felt it was important to film in Toronto since the city hadn't been featured in many classic romantic comedies.

Additional filming for a new ending took place in Toronto in November 2013. After testing the film with different focus groups, the filmmakers realized audiences wanted a more conclusive ending, so new scenes set 18 months later were shot. Radcliffe initially had reservations about changing the ending but later felt "really happy with it".

Casey Affleck was originally attached to play the lead, but he was replaced by Radcliffe. Radcliffe said it was important for him to have a role in the film as he had never starred in a contemporary movie and it was something he wanted to try. In an interview with Cineplex, Radcliffe said he and co-star Zoe Kazan improvised many lines to create a natural atmosphere between them.

== Release ==
The film's worldwide distribution rights were acquired by Entertainment One and they handled the theatrical release in Canada and the United Kingdom. North American sales of distribution were obtained by United Talent Agency.

=== Title change ===
CBS Films acquired the U.S. distribution rights to the film following its world premiere at the 2013 Toronto International Film Festival. They changed its U.S. release title to What If when the Motion Picture Association of America (MPAA) took issue with the implied foul word (fuck) in The F Word. The MPAA also strove for a PG-13 rating, according to producer David Gross, causing the name change in the United States. It was also retitled by Entertainment One for the United Kingdom, but the original title was retained for the Canadian release.

=== Home media ===
The film was released on DVD and streaming services on November 25, 2014.

== Music ==
The F Word's soundtrack was scored by A. C. Newman and features artists such as Edward Sharpe and the Magnetic Zeroes, Patrick Watson, Marsha Hunt, and the Parting Gifts. The album has 17 tracks, 13 of which were written by A. C. Newman.

Track listing

No.	Title	Artist(s)	Length
1.	"(Walkin' Through the) Sleepy City ft. The Parting Gifts"	The Parting Gifts	1:58
2.	"The Ballad of Wallace and Chantry"	A. C. Newman	2:28
3.	"At the Movies, in the Changing Room"	A. C. Newman	2:10
4.	"Just Walking to the Dress Shop"	A. C. Newman	2:49
5.	"Hospital Happiness"	A. C. Newman	1:17
6.	"Into Giants ft. Patrick Watson"	Patrick Watson	4:28
7.	"Dropping Chantry Off"	A. C. Newman	1:29
8.	"Beach Bummer"	A. C. Newman	2:07
9.	"Chantry's Ticket"	A. C. Newman	1:23
10.	"(Oh No! Not) the Beast Day ft. Marsha Hunt"	Marsha Hunt	3:14
11.	"Making a List"	A. C. Newman	1:34
12.	"Last Minute Travel Plans"	A. C. Newman	0:59
13.	"Punched out in Dublin"	A. C. Newman	1:21
14.	"Booking It Back"	A. C. Newman	2:51
15.	"Diner Drag"	A. C. Newman	1:33
16.	"Packing with Dalia"	A. C. Newman	1:08
17.	"Let's Get High [Explicit] ft. Edward Sharpe & The Magnetic Zeros"	Edward Sharpe and the Magnetic Zeroes	6:30
Total length:			36:08

== Reception ==
=== Critical response ===
The F Word was considered "one of the hottest films" at TIFF, who named it one of Canada's top ten films of the year.

On Rotten Tomatoes the film has an approval rating of 74% based on 133 reviews, with an average rating of 6.3/10. The site's critical consensus states: "Its narrative framework may be familiar, but What If transcends its derivative elements with sharp dialogue and the effervescent chemistry of stars Daniel Radcliffe and Zoe Kazan." On Metacritic, the film has a score of 59 out of 100, based on reviews from 36 critics, indicating "mixed or average reviews". Audiences surveyed by CinemaScore gave the film an average grade of "A–" on an A+ to F scale.

John DeFore of The Hollywood Reporter gave a positive review of the film, remarking, "Hitting all the rom-com notes with wit and some charm, it'll be a crowd-pleaser in theaters and help moviegoers move on from seeing co-star Daniel Radcliffe only as the world's favorite wizard". Justin Chang of Variety wrote, "Roughly three parts charming to one part cloying, 'The F Word' attempts and largely succeeds at pulling off a smart, self-aware riff on romantic-comedy conventions while maintaining a core of earnest feeling". Film.com gave it a 7.2 out of 10, noting it was "elevated from an above-average romantic comedy to a movie worthy of being embraced by a generation of twenty somethings because it refuses to let its characters off the hook". JoBlo.com's Chris Bumbray said the film "feels like it could be the Toronto answer to the Sundance breakout hit 500 Days of Summer. Like that movie, it takes a stale genre, and gives it a hip indie twist. It is director Michael Dowse's follow-up to GOON, and just like that film, its hilariously foul script disguises a surprisingly soft, big-hearted centre". Betsy Sharkey of the Los Angeles Times thought it was "the best, and sweetest, of the filmmaker's work yet".

The Guardian initially scored the film two out of five stars, saying it was "really hard to finish" and "liable to leave you queasy" but a later review by a different reviewer scored the film four out of five stars, calling it a "light, delightful movie". Katherine Monk of Postmedia News reported that "It's a competent genre piece, but it's still a bland burger of a movie." and adding it is a movie that audiences have "...seen a hundred times before." Eric Kohn of IndieWire wrote, "The movie primarily frustrates by doing nothing fresh. Careening toward an overly neat and tender resolution, "The F Word" lacks the gall to let its uncoordinated characters wind up victims of their situation". Peter Travers of Rolling Stone remarked that "What If doesn't break new ground. But it has charm to spare, and Radcliffe and Kazan are irresistible. No ifs about it", giving it an overall positive review.

The film has been criticized for its repetitive attempts at humor through ableism. Kathryn Bromwich, writing for The Guardian, remarked: 'I recently had to switch off a seemingly inoffensive mid-2010s romcom (which has been described as a "light, delightful movie" with a "hip indie twist") after its fourth joke at the expense of disabled people in under an hour.'

Susan Wloszczyna, writing for RogerEbert.com, gave the film two and a half stars out of four, describing it as "sweet, charming and sincere".

In 2023, Barry Hertz of The Globe and Mail named the film as one of the 23 best Canadian comedy films ever made.

=== Accolades ===
Year	Award	Recipient	Result
2014	Canadian Screen Award for Best Picture	The F Word	Nominated
2014	Canadian Screen Award for Best Director	Michael Dowse	Nominated
2014	Canadian Screen Award for Best Actor in a Leading Role	Daniel Radcliffe	Nominated
2014	Canadian Screen Award for Best Actress in a Supporting Role	Mackenzie Davis	Nominated
2014	Canadian Screen Award for Best Motion Picture	André Rouleau David Gross Macdara Kelleher	Nominated
2014	Canadian Screen Award for Best Adapted Screenplay	Elan Mastai	Won
2014	Directors Guild of Canada Craft Award for Direction – Feature Film	Michael Dowse	Nominated
2014	Directors Guild of Canada Team Award for Feature Film	Michael Dowse Regina Robb and team	Nominated
2014	Rogers Award for Best Canadian Film	Michael Dowse	Nominated
2014	Writers Guild of Canada Award for Movies & Miniseries	Elan Mastai	Won
2015	Vancouver Film Critics Circle Award for Best Screenplay for a Canadian Film	Elan Mastai	Nominated
