= Seann William Scott =

American actor (born 1976)

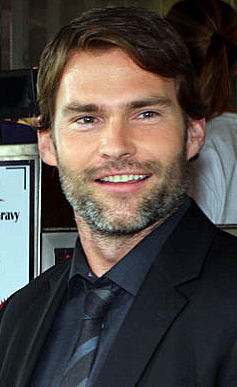
- Scott in 2012
- Born: October 3, 1976 (age 50); Cottage Grove, Minnesota, U.S.
- Occupation: Actor
- Years active: 1996–present
- Spouse: Olivia Korenberg (m. 2019; div. 2024)
- Partner: Lindsay Frimodt (2012–2013)
- Children: 1

Seann William Scott (born October 3, 1976) is an American actor. In film, Scott is best known for his breakout role as Steve Stifler in the American Pie film series (1999–2012). He also starred in a lead role as Doug Glatt in Goon (2011) and its sequel, Goon: Last of the Enforcers (2017). His other notable lead film credits include Dude, Where's My Car? (2000), Road Trip (2000), Final Destination (2000), Evolution (2001), The Rundown (2003), The Dukes of Hazzard (2005), Mr. Woodcock (2007), Role Models (2008), and The Wrath of Becky (2023). Scott had a supporting voice role as Crash in the Ice Age film series (2006–2016).

In television, Scott was a main cast member on the Fox series Lethal Weapon (2018–2019) and Welcome to Flatch (2022–2023), as well as the ABC sitcom Shifting Gears (2025–present). He also reprised his film voice role as Crash in two Ice Age television specials: A Mammoth Christmas (2011) and The Great Egg-Scapade (2016).

== Early life ==
Scott was born and raised in Cottage Grove, Minnesota, the son of Patricia Anne Simons and William Frank Scott. Scott's father died in 2007. He is the youngest of his seven siblings. He graduated from Park High School, where he was part of the varsity football and basketball teams. He has attended the University of Wisconsin and Glendale Community College. Scott dedicated himself to acting and relocated to Los Angeles.

== Career ==
=== 1996–2013: Breakthrough with American Pie films ===
Early in his career, Scott worked at The Home Depot and the Los Angeles Zoo to support himself between acting jobs. He also appeared in the Aerosmith music video, "Hole in my Soul." In 1996, Scott made his first on-screen appearance as Moondoggie on The WB sitcom Unhappily Ever After, in the episode "Beach Party." He later landed the role of Steve Stifler in the comedy film American Pie (1999). Scott revealed that he was paid $8,000 for his supporting role in the film, which ultimately grossed over $235 million worldwide. He reprised the role in the film's three sequels: American Pie 2 (2001), American Wedding (2003), and American Reunion (2012). For his performance in American Reunion, Scott reportedly received a $5 million salary and a share of the profits.

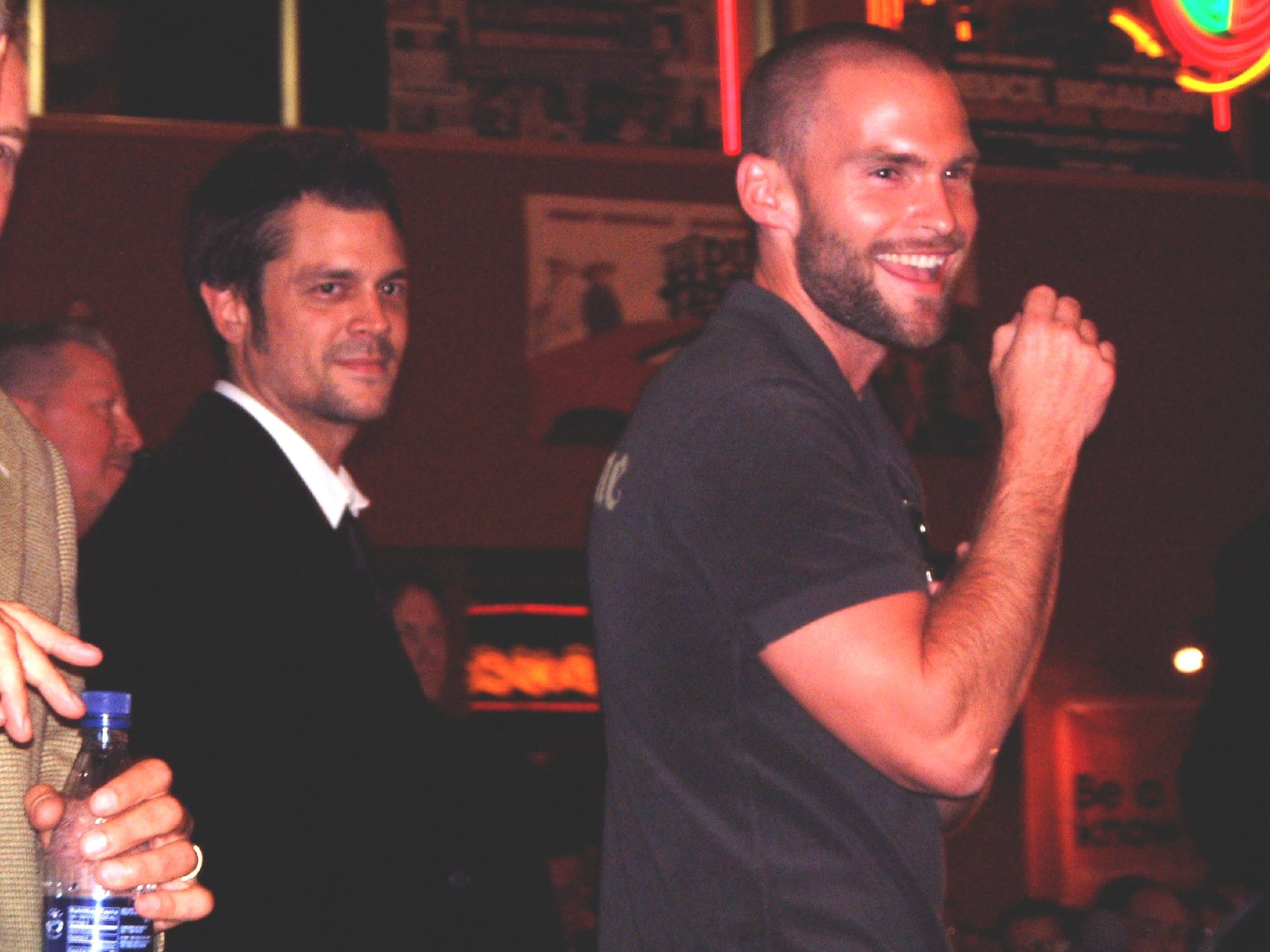
Scott (right) with co-star Johnny Knoxville at The Dukes of Hazzard premiere in 2005.

Scott won two Teen Choice Awards for Choice Sleazebag for his portrayal of Steve Stifler in American Pie and American Pie 2, and received an MTV Movie Award for Best Dance Sequence for American Wedding. He also shared an MTV Movie Award for Best Kiss with Jason Biggs for American Pie 2.

Following the American Pie series, Scott appeared in a range of roles, including Billy Hitchcock in the horror film Final Destination (2000) and Chester Greenburg in Dude, Where's My Car? (2000), with the latter film emerging as a box office success, earning $73.2 million worldwide against a $13 million budget. He also appeared in Road Trip (2000), Jay and Silent Bob Strike Back (2001), Evolution (2001), Stark Raving Mad (2002) and Bulletproof Monk (2003). He played Peppers in Old School (2003), which emerged as a moderate commercial success. That same year, Scott co-hosted the 2003 MTV Movie Awards alongside Justin Timberlake.[12]

In 2005, Scott portrayed Bo Duke in The Dukes of Hazzard (2005), which despite negative critical reception, grossed $111 million worldwide. In 2006, he was nominated for the MTV Movie Award for Best On-Screen Team, alongside Jessica Simpson and Johnny Knoxville, for their performances in The Dukes of Hazzard.

He voiced the character Crash in Ice Age: The Meltdown (2006) and reprised the role in its sequels, Ice Age: Dawn of the Dinosaurs (2009) and Ice Age: Continental Drift (2012).

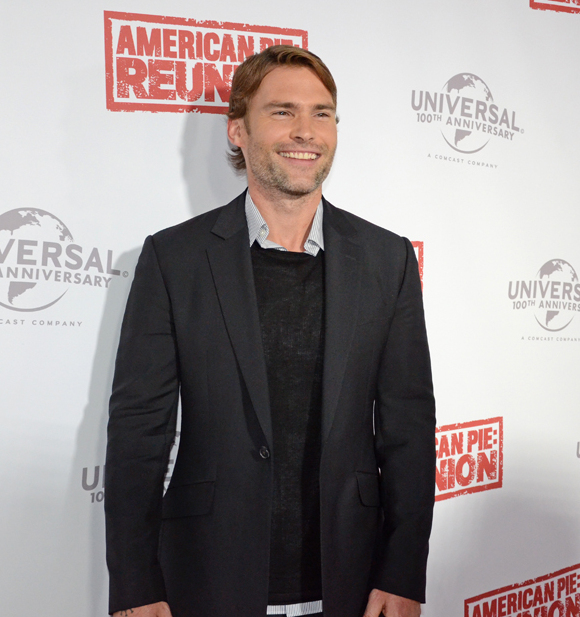
Scott at a media event for American Reunion at Harry's Cafe de Wheels in Melbourne.

In 2007, Scott played a police officer in Southland Tales, reuniting with Dwayne "The Rock" Johnson, his co-star from The Rundown (2003). The two also appeared in parody skits, including scenes from The Matrix Reloaded (2003), which were featured on The Matrix Reloaded DVD. Scott later hosted Saturday Night Live and was a guest co-host on Live with Regis and Kelly. He appeared as John Farley in Mr. Woodcock (2007) and as Jeff Nichols in Trainwreck: My Life as an Idiot (2007). His next film, Role Models (2008), received generally positive reviews and was a commercial success, earning over $92 million worldwide.

He appeared in the action-comedy Cop Out (2010) alongside Bruce Willis, Tracy Morgan, and Kevin Pollak. To prepare for the role, Scott gained weight and refrained from exercising for six months. In 2011, he starred as Doug "The Thug" Glatt in the Canadian sports comedy Goon, which emerged as a critical success and grossed $6.7 million worldwide. In 2012, he appeared in the ensemble film Movie 43, in the segment titled "Happy Birthday." That same year, Scott received an honorary medal from the Philosophical Society at Trinity College. In October 2013, he guest-starred in an episode of the FX sitcom It's Always Sunny in Philadelphia, playing Mac’s cousin, Country Mac.

=== 2014–present: Continued film work and transition to television ===
Scott portrayed Ted Morgan in the comedy-drama film Just Before I Go (2015). He reprised his role as Crash in Ice Age: Collision Course (2016) and returned as Doug "The Thug" Glatt in Goon: Last of the Enforcers (2017). In 2018, he made a cameo appearance as a Vermont State Trooper in Super Troopers 2.

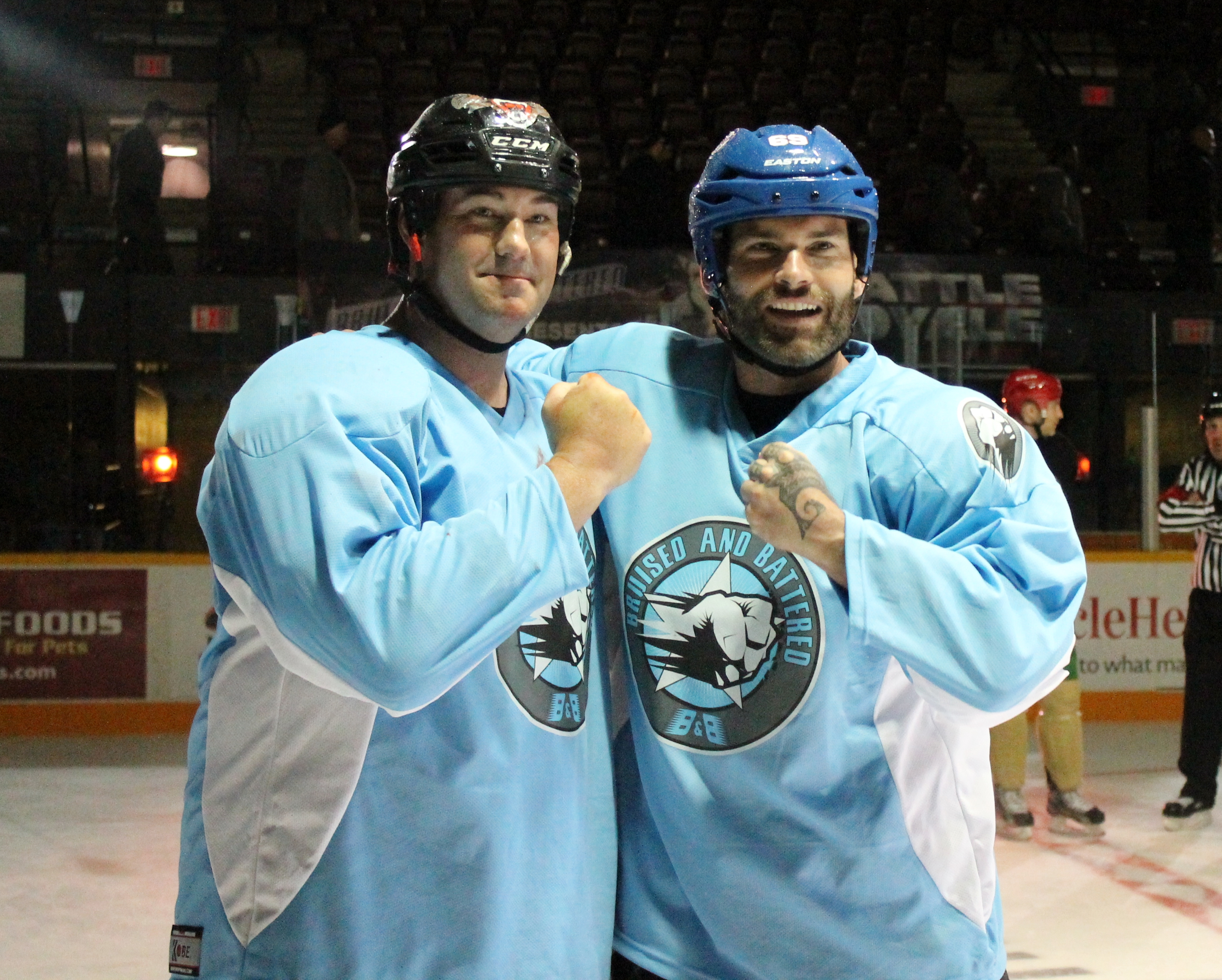
Doug Smith (left) and Scott on the set of Goon: Last of the Enforcers (2017).

Scott starred as Evan in the horror film Bloodline (2018). In May 2018, he was cast as the new series lead in the Fox television series Lethal Weapon, portraying a new character, Wesley Cole. He replaced Clayne Crawford, who was removed from the series following reports of on-set misconduct and hostile behavior. Lethal Weapon was canceled by Fox on May 10, 2019, after three seasons. That same year, Scott played Martin, an abusive stepfather, in the coming-of-age road film Already Gone.

In February 2020, Scott was cast as Father Joe in the Fox comedy series Welcome to Flatch (2022–2023), created by Jenny Bicks and based on the British television series This Country. The series was canceled after two seasons, with its final episode airing on February 2, 2023.

From June to July 2023, Scott appeared alongside American Pie co-star Jason Biggs for DoorDash's “Summer of DashPass” campaign, which featured television commercials and promotional content. In 2024, he appeared in the opening sequence of the action comedy film Jackpot!, playing a lottery winner who must fend off attackers in a dystopian version of California.

== Personal life ==
Media reports indicated that Scott dated former Victoria's Secret model Deanna Miller from 2005 to 2008.

In March 2011, Scott voluntarily checked into a treatment center to address unspecified "health and personal issues."

In March 2012, Scott confirmed that he had proposed on Valentine's Day and became engaged to fashion model Lindsay Frimodt. However, in January 2013, Us Weekly reported that the engagement had ended and that the two had amicably separated but remained friends.

Scott married interior designer Olivia Korenberg on September 2, 2019, welcoming daughter Frankie Rose Scott, in June 2020. On February 13, 2024, Scott filed for divorce, citing "irreconcilable differences" as the reason for their split. The couple agreed to share joint legal and physical custody of their daughter, with Scott agreeing to pay $6,000 per month in child support.

== Filmography ==
=== Film ===
Key
†	Denotes films that have not yet been released

Year	Title	Role	Notes
1999	American Pie	Steve Stifler	
2000	Final Destination	Billy Hitchcock	
2000	Road Trip	E.L. Faldt	Also performer: "I Wanna Rock"
2000	Dude, Where's My Car?	Chester Greenburg	
2001	Evolution	Wayne Grey	Also performer: "You Are So Beautiful"
2001	American Pie 2	Steve Stifler	
2001	Jay and Silent Bob Strike Back	Brent	
2002	Stark Raving Mad	Ben McGewan	
2003	Old School	Peppers	
2003	Bulletproof Monk	Kar	
2003	American Wedding	Steve Stifler	
2003	The Rundown	Travis Alfred Walker	
2005	The Dukes of Hazzard	Bo Duke	
2006	Ice Age: The Meltdown	Crash	Voice
2006	Southland Tales	Roland / Ronald Taverner	
2007	Trainwreck: My Life as an Idiot	Jeff Nichols	
2007	Mr. Woodcock	John Farley	
2008	The Promotion	Doug Stauber	
2008	Role Models	Wheeler	
2009	Ice Age: Dawn of the Dinosaurs	Crash	Voice
2009	Balls Out: Gary the Tennis Coach	Gary Houseman	Also producer
2009	Planet 51	Skiff	Voice
2010	Cop Out	Dave	
2010	Under the Boardwalk: The Monopoly Story	Wheeler	Documentary; archive footage - uncredited
2010	Jackass 3D	Himself	Guest appearance
2011	Goon	Doug "The Thug" Glatt	
2011	Final Destination 5	Billy Hitchcock	Archive footage
2012	American Reunion	Steve Stifler	Also executive producer
2012	Ice Age: Continental Drift	Crash	Voice
2013	Movie 43	Brian	Segment: "Happy Birthday"
2014	Just Before I Go	Ted Morgan	
2016	Ice Age: Collision Course	Crash	Voice
2017	Goon: Last of the Enforcers	Doug "The Thug" Glatt	Also executive producer
2018	Super Troopers 2	Trooper Callaghan	Cameo
2018	Bloodline	Evan Cole	
2019	Already Gone	Martin	
2023	The Wrath of Becky	Darryl	Also executive producer
2024	Jackpot!	Rugged Man	
2025	Bad Man	Bobby Gaines	
2025	Dolly	Chase	
2027

=== Television ===
Year	Title	Role	Notes
1996	Unhappily Ever After	Moondoggie	Episode: "Beach Party"
1997	Born Into Exile	Derek	Television film
1998	Something So Right	Preston	Episode: "Something About a Double Standard"
2001	Saturday Night Live	Various roles	Episode: "Seann William Scott/Sum 41"
2011	Ice Age: A Mammoth Christmas	Crash (voice)	Television special
2013	It's Always Sunny in Philadelphia	Country Mac	Episode: "Mac Day"
2013	Timms Valley	U.S. Marshal Kev	Pilot
2016	Ice Age: The Great Egg-Scapade	Crash (voice)	Television special
2018–2019	Lethal Weapon	Wesley Cole	Main role
2022–2023	Welcome to Flatch	Joseph "Father Joe" Binghoffer	Main role
2025–present	Shifting Gears	Gabriel	Main role
2025	The Righteous Gemstones	Corey	5 episodes

=== Music videos ===
Year	Artist	Title	Role
1997	Aerosmith	"Hole in My Soul"	Quarterback

=== Video games ===
Year	Title	Voice role	Notes
2000	Nox	Jack Mower	

=== Web series ===
Year	Title	Role	Notes
1998	Chad's World	Jim	Episode: "I Lost My Friend"

== Awards and nominations ==
Year	Award	Category	Nominated work	Result
2000	Young Hollywood Awards	Best Ensemble Cast (shared with the cast)	American Pie	Won
2000	Teen Choice Awards	Choice Movie Sleazebag	American Pie	Nominated
2001	Teen Choice Awards	Choice Chemistry (shared with Ashton Kutcher)	Dude, Where's My Car?	Nominated
2002	MTV Movie & TV Awards	Best Comedic Performance	American Pie 2	Nominated
2002	MTV Movie & TV Awards	Best Kiss (shared with Jason Biggs)	American Pie 2	Won
2002	Teen Choice Awards	Choice Movie Sleazebag	American Pie 2	Won
2004	MTV Movie & TV Awards	Best Dance Sequence	American Wedding	Won
2004	Teen Choice Awards	Choice Movie Actor – Comedy	American Wedding	Nominated
2004	Teen Choice Awards	Choice Movie Blush	American Wedding	Nominated
2004	Teen Choice Awards	Choice Movie Sleazebag	American Wedding	Won
2005	Stinkers Bad Movie Awards	Less Than Dynamic Duo (shared with Johnny Knoxville)	The Dukes of Hazzard	Nominated
2006	MTV Movie & TV Awards	Best On-Screen Team (shared with Johnny Knoxville and Jessica Simpson)	The Dukes of Hazzard	Nominated
2013	Behind the Voice Actors Awards	Best Vocal Ensemble in a Feature Film (shared with the cast)	Ice Age: Continental Drift	Nominated
2013	34th Golden Raspberry Awards	Worst Screen Combo (shared with the cast)	Movie 43	Nominated

Preceded by Sarah Michelle Gellar and Jack Black	MTV Movie Awards host 2003 (with Justin Timberlake)	Succeeded by Lindsay Lohan
