= Jay Baruchel =

Canadian actor (born 1982)

- Baruchel in 2026
- Born: Jonathan Adam Saunders Baruchel; April 9, 1982 (age 44); Ottawa, Ontario, Canada
- Occupations: Actor, director, producer, writer
- Years active: 1995–present
- Spouse: Rebecca-Jo Dunham (m. 2019)

Jonathan Adam Saunders "Jay" Baruchel (/ˈbærəʃɛl/; born April 9, 1982) is a Canadian actor and filmmaker. He voiced Hiccup Haddock in the How to Train Your Dragon franchise (2010–2019) and had lead roles in the comedies Fanboys (2009), She's Out of My League (2010), and This Is the End (2013). Baruchel was the co-lead in the Disney action-fantasy film The Sorcerer's Apprentice (2010). Films in which Baruchel has had a starring role have grossed over $1.28 billion at the worldwide box office as of 2024.

Baruchel has also had supporting roles in comedy movies such as Knocked Up (2007), Tropic Thunder (2008), Goon (2011), and The Art of the Steal (2013). In television, he had lead roles as Steven Karp in Judd Apatow's comedy series Undeclared (2001–2002) and Josh Greenberg in the FXX comedy series Man Seeking Woman (2015–2017), both of which received praise from critics.

Baruchel had a lead role as BlackBerry co-founder Mike Lazaridis in the film BlackBerry (2023). He has also had non-comedic lead roles in films such as Good Neighbours (2010), The Kindness of Strangers (2019), and Humane (2024), and supporting roles in Million Dollar Baby (2004), Cosmopolis (2012), and RoboCop (2014).

Baruchel has directed the films Goon: Last of the Enforcers (2017) and Random Acts of Violence (2019), both of which he also acted in.

== Early life ==
Baruchel was born in Ottawa, Ontario, the son of Robyne (née Ropell), a freelance writer, and Serge Baruchel, an antiques dealer. He grew up in the Notre-Dame-de-Grâce neighbourhood of Montréal, Quebec, and has a younger sister. His father was born in Paris, France. Baruchel is of one-quarter Jewish descent, with the rest of his ancestry being French and Irish-Catholic. He has stated that he believes his Irish roots are from County Mayo.

== Career ==
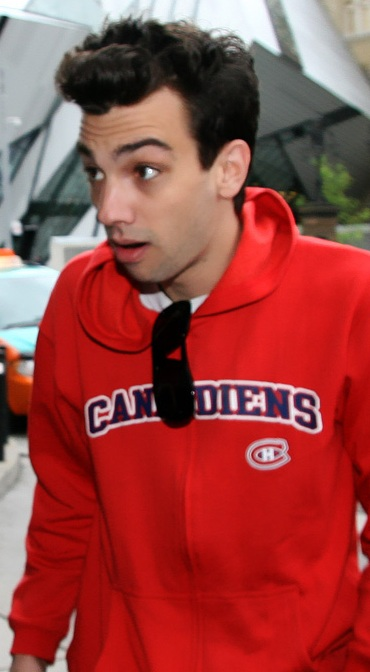
Baruchel pictured at the 2008 Toronto International Film Festival

Baruchel got his first acting job when he was just 12. One of his first major acting roles was on the local television series My Hometown in 1996. From 1997 to 1998, he co-hosted Popular Mechanics for Kids with Elisha Cuthbert. After appearing briefly in Cameron Crowe's Oscar winning film Almost Famous, Baruchel won the role of Steven Karp on Judd Apatow's acclaimed yet short-lived television series Undeclared, where he starred alongside Seth Rogen, Carla Gallo, Charlie Hunnam, and Monica Keena. He then appeared with James Van Der Beek in Roger Avary's The Rules of Attraction.

In 2004, Baruchel played boxing hopeful Danger Barch in Clint Eastwood's Million Dollar Baby. Baruchel then starred in Nemesis Game and Fetching Cody, before appearing opposite Don Johnson on the WB's Just Legal in 2005, and guest-starring on the CBS drama Numb3rs in 2006.

Baruchel appeared in the films Knocked Up (which reunited him with Judd Apatow, Jason Segel, and Seth Rogen), I'm Reed Fish, Just Buried, and the Ben Stiller-directed Tropic Thunder, alongside Jack Black, Nick Nolte, Steve Coogan, and Robert Downey Jr. He co-starred with Seth Rogen in the 2007 trailer for Jay and Seth versus the Apocalypse, created by Rogen and Evan Goldberg as a strategy to garner interest and funding for a similar, larger-scale project (later made in 2013 as This Is the End). In 2008, he appeared in Nick and Norah's Infinite Playlist. He also made a brief appearance in Night at the Museum 2: Battle of the Smithsonian.

In 2010, Baruchel starred in the films The Trotsky, DreamWorks' She's Out of My League (opposite Alice Eve), and the live-action Disney adaptation of The Sorcerer's Apprentice. He also voiced the starring role in the acclaimed animated feature, How to Train Your Dragon, a role he has subsequently continued throughout the franchise, including its television series. Also in 2010, he played two supporting characters in the Canadian comedy series The Drunk and On Drugs Happy Fun Time Hour. He developed the screenplay for Goon, with Evan Goldberg, playing Johnny Klutz, a character of his own creation. Goon co-stars Seann William Scott and fellow Canadian actor Eugene Levy.

Baruchel also appeared in the 2010 Adidas Originals ad campaign, "Cantina", in conjunction with the FIFA World Cup and in video clips for Canadian prog-rockers Rush's 2012–13 Clockwork Angels tour.

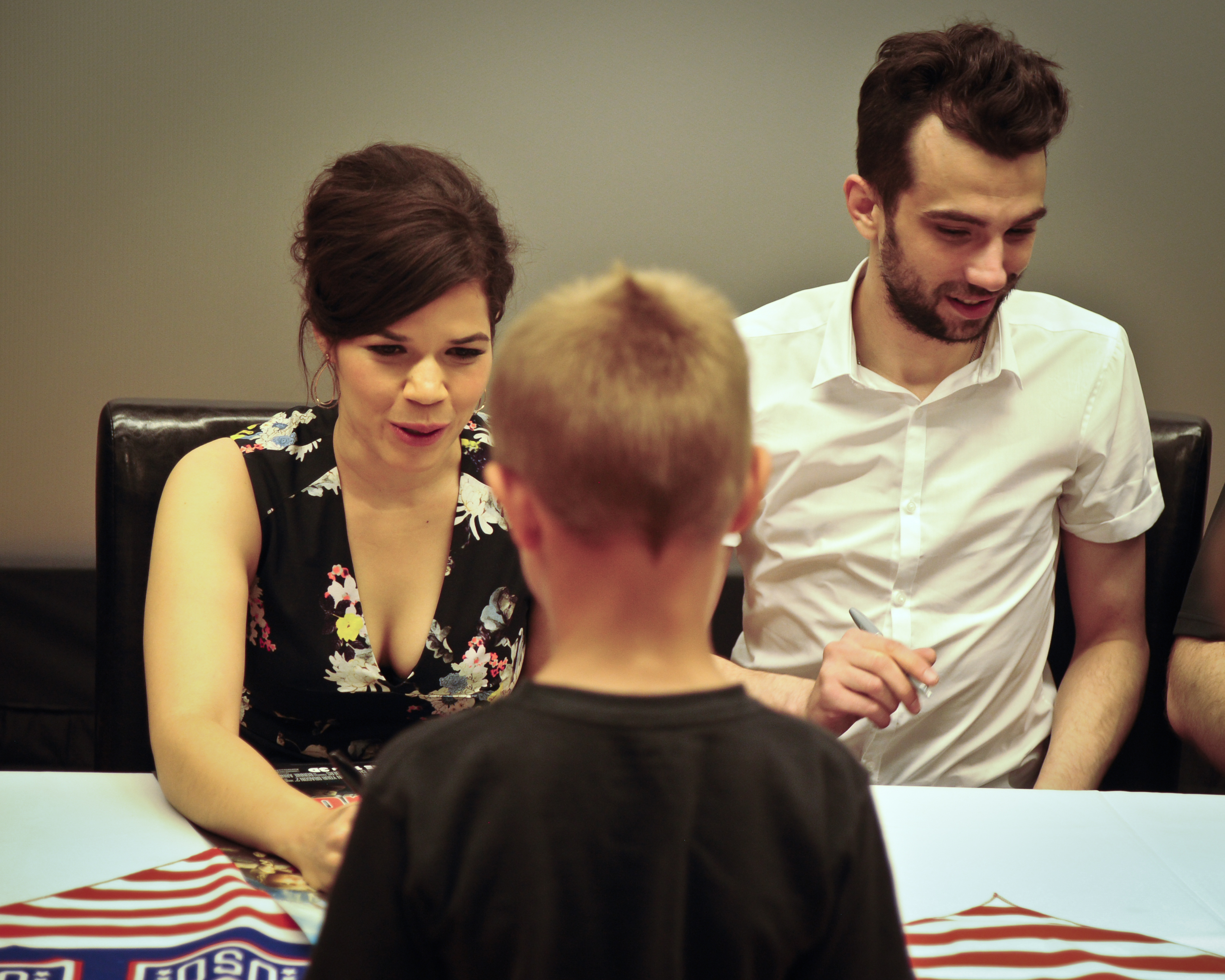
Baruchel and his How to Train Your Dragon co-star America Ferrera signing autographs during a USO tour on June 4, 2014, at Joint Base McGuire-Dix-Lakehurst

In July 2012, he appeared in the music video for the song "Toxsik Waltz" by rapper Necro. In the summer of 2013, he starred in the hit apocalyptic comedy This Is the End and in 2014, he appeared in the RoboCop remake and reprised his role as Hiccup in How to Train Your Dragon 2.

In July 2014, it was announced that Baruchel would be starring in the FXX comedy Man Seeking Woman which premiered in January 2015. He also appeared in the 2015 music video for the song "Every Little Means Trust" by Idlewild.

Baruchel was also involved in writing the Chapterhouse comic book series Captain Canuck.

Baruchel wrote, directed, and starred in the 2017 sports comedy film Goon: Last of the Enforcers, the sequel to the 2011 film Goon.

In 2018, he made his debut as an author, with Born Into It: A Fan's Life, released on Harper Collins. The book explored his love of the Montreal Canadiens with anecdotes, childhood memories, and heartfelt tales about his life as a fan of the team.

After the release of How to Train Your Dragon: The Hidden World, 2019 saw Baruchel star in the Danish film The Kindness of Strangers and the Canadian horror film Random Acts of Violence, which was his second film as a director.

In 2021, Baruchel hosted the original audio podcast documentary series for Audible.ca, Highly Legal, that explored the political and economic history and aftermath of Canada's legalization of marijuana. In the same year, Baruchel and his wife, Rebecca-Jo Dunham, both appeared in the music video for "Ouch", the lead single from The Tragically Hip's archival EP Saskadelphia. He was also named host of LOL: Last One Laughing Canada, which premiered on February 18, 2022 on Amazon Prime Video. He appears in the seventh episode of The Kids in the Hall revival.

In 2022, Baruchel hosted the Crave original series We're All Gonna Die (Even Jay Baruchel), a six-episode docuseries about the end of the world that explored potential world-ending risks. Baruchel, as host, met with scientists and other experts to discuss the feasibility of the risks and the potential solutions and innovations to counter the issues.

Baruchel had a lead role as BlackBerry co-founder Mike Lazaridis in the biographical comedy-drama film BlackBerry (2023), for which he won a Canadian Screen Award for Best Lead Performance in a Comedy Film.

In November 2024, Baruchel joined the cast of the romcom film Mile End Kicks. He is also set to play Ken Carter in The Stunt Driver, a comedy film about the Canadian stunt driver's exploits.

== Personal life ==
Baruchel was engaged to actress Alison Pill from 2011 to 2013. He alluded to their break-up in a Twitter post on February 16, 2013. In September 2019, Baruchel married Rebecca-Jo Dunham. In September 2026, Baruchel announced that they are expecting their first child.

Baruchel has said that he is "probably agnostic". He has several tattoos including a Celtic cross on his upper right arm to honour his Irish heritage and a red maple leaf on his left pectoral.

Baruchel has been a supporter of Scottish football club Celtic F.C. since the early 2000s; in 2016, he co-produced a documentary detailing his journey towards falling in love with the club.

== Filmography ==
=== Film ===
Year	Title	Role	Notes
1999	Running Home	Kid #2	
1999	Who Gets the House?	Jonathan	
2000	Almost Famous	Victor "Vic" Munoz	
2002	Edgar and Jane	—N/a	Short film; director, writer and producer
2002	The Rules of Attraction	Harry	
2003	Nemesis Game	Jeremy Curran	
2004	Million Dollar Baby	"Danger" Barch	
2005	Fetching Cody	Art Frankel	
2006	I'm Reed Fish	Reed Fish	
2007	Knocked Up	Jay	
2007	Jay and Seth versus the Apocalypse	Himself	Short film; also writer
2007	Just Buried	Oliver Whynacht	
2008	Real Time	Andy Hayes	
2008	Tropic Thunder	Kevin Sandusky	
2008	Nick and Norah's Infinite Playlist	Tal Hanson	
2009	Fanboys	Windows	
2009	Night at the Museum: Battle of the Smithsonian	Sailor Joey Motorola	
2009	The Trotsky	Leon Bronstein	
2010	She's Out of My League	Kirk Kettner	
2010	How to Train Your Dragon	Hiccup Horrendous Haddock III	Voice
2010	The Sorcerer's Apprentice	Dave Stutler	
2010	Good Neighbours	Victor	
2010	Legend of the Boneknapper Dragon	Hiccup Horrendous Haddock III	Voice; short film
2011	Goon	Patrick "Pat" Hoolihan	Also writer and producer
2011	Book of Dragons	Hiccup Horrendous Haddock III	Voice; short film
2011	Gift of the Night Fury	Hiccup Horrendous Haddock III	Voice; short film
2012	Cosmopolis	Shiner	
2012	The Watchmaker	Tax Man	Short film
2013	This Is the End	Himself	Co-producer
2013	The Art of the Steal	Francie Tobin	
2014	RoboCop	Tom Pope	
2014	Don Peyote	Bates	
2014	How to Train Your Dragon 2	Hiccup Horrendous Haddock III	Voice
2014	Dawn of the Dragon Racers	Hiccup Horrendous Haddock III	Voice; short film
2016	Ice Guardians	Himself	Hockey, Commentator
2016	Lovesick	Mark	
2017	Goon: Last of the Enforcers	Patrick "Pat" Hoolihan	Also director and writer
2019	The Kindness of Strangers	John Peter	
2019	Random Acts of Violence	Ezra	Also director, writer and producer
2019	How to Train Your Dragon: The Hidden World	Hiccup Horrendous Haddock III	Voice
2023	BlackBerry	Mike Lazaridis	
2024	Humane	Jared York	
2025	Mile End Kicks	Jeff	
2025	Nirvanna the Band the Show the Movie	—N/a	Special thanks
2025	Bread Will Walk	All Characters	Voice
2026	I, Object	TBA	
2026	The Stunt Driver	Ken Carter	
2026	Tiny Fugitives	Mark	

=== Television ===
Year	Title	Role	Notes
1995, 1999–2000	Are You Afraid of the Dark?	Joe / Alex / Ross Doyle / Jason Midas	4 episodes
1996–1998	My Hometown	Thomas Thompson	Main role
1997–1998	Popular Mechanics for Kids	Himself	
1998	The Worst Witch	Bean Pole	Episode: "The Great Outdoors"
2001–2002	Undeclared	Steven Karp	Main role
2002	Matthew Blackheart: Monster Smasher	Jimmy Fleming	Television film
2004	The Stones	Winston Stone	6 episodes
2005–2006	Just Legal	Skip Ross	8 episodes
2006–2007	Numb3rs	Oswald Kittner	2 episodes
2011	The Drunk and On Drugs Happy Fun Time Hour	Private Prosciutto / Falcon	2 episodes
2012–2018	DreamWorks Dragons	Hiccup Horrendous Haddock III	Voice; main role
2012	Being Human	Stu	Episode: "When I Think About You I Shred Myself"
2014	Trailer Park Boys	—N/a	Director; episode: "Crawling Through the Shitpipe"
2015–2017	Man Seeking Woman	Josh Greenberg	Main role
2018	Letterkenny	"Hard Right" Jay	2 episodes
2018	The Magic School Bus Rides Again	Dr. Tillage	Voice; episode: "Ghost Farm"
2019	The Moodys	Sean Moody Jr.	Main role
2019	How to Train Your Dragon: Homecoming	Hiccup Horrendous Haddock III	Voice; short film
2019–2020	Trailer Park Boys: The Animated Series	Fucknel	Voice; 2 episodes
2022	LOL: Last One Laughing Canada	Host	
2022	Son of a Critch	—N/a	Director; 2 episodes
2022	The Kids in the Hall	Smoker	Episode 7
2022	We're All Gonna Die (Even Jay Baruchel)	Himself	Main role
2023	Son of a Critch	Scott Howell	Episode: "Pope Visit"
2023–2025	FUBAR	Carter Perlmutter	Main role
TBA	Reacher	Chief Buck Bauer	Main role (season 5)

=== Music videos ===
Year	Band	Song	Notes	Ref
2015	Idlewild	"Every Little Means Trust"	Actor	
2021	Tragically hip	“OUCH”	Actor	
2022	Alexisonfire	"Sweet Dreams of Otherness"	Director	

== Awards and nominations ==
Year	Award	Category	Nominated work	Result	Ref.
2007	US Comedy Arts Festival	Best Actor Award	I'm Reed Fish	Won	
2010	Canadian Comedy Awards	Best Performance by a Male – Film	The Trotsky	Won	
2011	Annie Awards	Best Voice Acting in an Animated Feature Production	How to Train Your Dragon	Won	
2011	Genie Awards	Best Performance by an Actor in a Leading Role	The Trotsky	Nominated	
2011	Jutra Awards	Best Actor (Meilleur Acteur)	The Trotsky	Won	
2011	Vancouver Film Critics Circle	Best Actor in a Canadian Film	The Trotsky	Nominated	
2013	Canadian Screen Awards	Adapted Screenplay (shared with Evan Goldberg)	Goon	Nominated	
2013	Vancouver Film Critics Circle	Best Supporting Actor in a Canadian Film	Goon	Nominated	
2014	Canadian Screen Awards	Performance by an Actor in a Supporting Role	The Art of the Steal	Nominated	
2014	MTV Movie Awards	Best Musical Moment	This Is the End	Won	
2019	ACTRA Award	Award of Excellence		Won	
2019	Daytime Emmy Awards	Outstanding Performer in an Animated Program	Dragons: Race to the Edge: Season 6	Won	
2024	Canadian Screen Awards	Best Lead Performance in a Comedy Film	BlackBerry	Won	
2024	Canadian Screen Awards	Performance in a guest role in a comedy series	Son of a Critch	Nominated	
