= David Gross (producer) =

Canadian film producer

- Education: American Film Institute
- Occupation: Film producer
- Awards: Canadian Screen Award for Best Motion Picture

David Gross is a Canadian film producer who has served as a key member in the company No Trace Camping, and as president of David Gross Productions Inc., based in Ontario.

== Early life and education ==
Gross is from Toronto, and graduated from the American Film Institute in 2007.

== Career ==
With Jesse Shapira finding the book Goon: The True Story of an Unlikely Journey Into a Minor Hockey League and envisioning a film adaptation, Shapira, Gross and No Trace Camping partners co-produced the 2011 film Goon. David Gross Productions Inc. later co-produced The F Word (2013) and Room (2015). Gross advocated for keeping the title The F Word for its Canadian release, although the Motion Picture Association of America found issues with it.

With Room, Gross persuaded his Irish co-producers to shoot in Canada rather than the United States, saying they could have a longer schedule and more money in Canada. He accepted the Canadian Screen Award for Best Motion Picture for Room in 2016.
