= Eddington (film) =

2025 film by Ari Aster

- Theatrical release poster
- Directed by: Ari Aster
- Written by: Ari Aster
- Produced by: Lars Knudsen; Ari Aster; Ann Ruark
- Starring: Joaquin Phoenix; Pedro Pascal; Luke Grimes; Deirdre O'Connell; Micheal Ward; Austin Butler; Emma Stone
- Cinematography: Darius Khondji
- Edited by: Lucian Johnston
- Music by: Daniel Pemberton; Bobby Krlic
- Production companies: A24; Square Peg; 828 Productions
- Distributed by: A24 (United States); Focus Features (United Kingdom; through Universal Pictures); Nordisk Film (Finland)
- Release dates: May 16, 2025 (Cannes); July 18, 2025 (United States); August 22, 2025 (United Kingdom and Finland)
- Running time: 149 minutes
- Countries: United States; United Kingdom; Finland
- Language: English
- Budget: $25 million
- Box office: $13.7 million

Eddington is a 2025 satirical neo-Western thriller film written and directed by Ari Aster, and starring Joaquin Phoenix, Pedro Pascal, Luke Grimes, Deirdre O'Connell, Micheal Ward, Austin Butler, and Emma Stone. Set in 2020 during the COVID-19 pandemic and George Floyd protests, the film examines the political and social turmoil in the fictional town of Eddington, New Mexico caused by the contested mayoral election fought between Sheriff Joe Cross (Phoenix) and Mayor Ted Garcia (Pascal).

The film had its world premiere at the main competition of the 2025 Cannes Film Festival on May 16, 2025, and was released in theaters by A24 on July 18, 2025. The film polarized critics, and was a box office bomb, grossing only $13.7 million worldwide.

== Plot ==
In late May 2020, as a result of the COVID-19 pandemic, Ted Garcia, mayor of the small town of Eddington, New Mexico, implements a lockdown and mask mandate based on the governor's orders. Conservative Sevilla County Sheriff Joe Cross publicly protests the measures, worsening his already-poor relationship with Garcia. Joe lives with his emotionally unstable and distant wife, Louise, and her mother, Dawn, an avid follower of QAnon-like conspiracy theories.

Joe decides to run for mayor against Garcia, who is running on a liberal, "tech-positive" platform which supports the construction of a massive data center near Eddington. He enlists his two deputies, Guy and Michael, as campaign aides. Angered by Joe's campaign announcement, his wife and mother-in-law invite conspiracist cult leader Vernon Jefferson Peak to dinner; Joe is skeptical of Peak's stories of child trafficking and ritual abuse, but his wife suggests that she was a victim of similar abuse.

Meanwhile, Garcia's high school-aged son Eric and his friend Brian get involved in Black Lives Matter protests, in part because they are competing for the affections of the social-justice minded Sarah. As the sheriff's office struggles to respond to escalating protests, Joe publicly claims that Garcia raped Louise as a teenager in order to sway the election in his favor. Louise releases a video denying Joe's claims and leaves town with Vernon.

Joe is embarrassed by his wife's denial, and further humiliated when, while responding to a noise complaint at Garcia's house during a fundraiser, Garcia slaps him. That night, he murders a local vagrant and dumps his body in a nearby river. Joe then kills Garcia and Eric in their home with a scoped rifle, staging the scene as an Antifa attack. Meanwhile, a mysterious private jet carrying heavily armed men and a collection of left-wing protest signs heads towards Eddington.

Joe's claims are doubted by Butterfly Jimenez, a tribal deputy from the adjacent Pueblo reservation who becomes involved in the investigation and correctly suspects the increasingly ill (presumably with COVID) Joe as the perpetrator. Joe, with the assistance of Guy, obstructs the investigation and frames Michael for the Garcias' deaths. Mere hours later, the armed men descend on Eddington, where they initiate several political false flag attacks and kidnap Michael from jail, killing Guy in the process. After wounding one of the assailants, who drops his phone, Joe realizes that he and others have been fed misinformation in order to aggravate tensions in Eddington. The men pursue Joe into the town, where he breaks into a gun store and begins firing a machine gun wildly in their direction. In doing so, he accidentally wounds Jimenez, who is killed by a sniper moments later. He then makes his way through the streets of the town, eventually dropping his machine gun and switching to an automatic rifle, which he uses to take out most of the other assailants. When the last attacker runs towards him, Joe's gun jams. The attacker stabs him twice in the top of his head, severely injuring him. Moments before Joe is killed, however, Brian appears, filming himself shooting and killing the attacker while also saving Joe's life.

A year later, Brian is a prominent conservative influencer, having capitalized on his filmed rescue of Joe from the purported Antifa terrorists, and also spouts now having a new girlfriend. Joe, left brain-damaged by the attack, has finally been elected Mayor of Eddington, but Dawn speaks on his behalf. Under Dawn's watch, the data center is opened, with the implication that the center's developers might have orchestrated the events of the preceding year. After returning from the center's grand opening, Joe and Dawn watch news coverage of Vernon and a pregnant Louise at a rally. Michael, who also survived and is now sheriff, practices target shooting on the outskirts of town. Dawn and a caregiver maneuver Joe into a bed, then she and the caregiver join Joe in the same bed.

== Cast ==
- Joaquin Phoenix as Joe Cross, Sevilla County sheriff and a mayoral candidate
- Pedro Pascal as Ted Garcia, Eddington's incumbent mayor who is running for re-election
- Emma Stone as Louise Cross, Joe's wife
- Austin Butler as Vernon Jefferson Peak, a radical cult leader
- Luke Grimes as Guy Tooley, a deputy at the Sevilla County Sheriff's Office in Eddington.
- Deirdre O'Connell as Dawn, Louise's mother
- Micheal Ward as Michael Cooke, a deputy at the Sevilla County Sheriff's Office in Eddington.
- Amélie Hoeferle as Sarah Allen, a social justice influencer
- Clifton Collins Jr. as Lodge, a mentally ill vagrant
- William Belleau as Officer Butterfly Jimenez, an intrepid Pueblo policeman
- Matt Gomez Hidaka as Eric Garcia, Mayor Garcia's son
- Cameron Mann as Brian, Eric's best friend
- Rachel de la Torre as Paula, a local restaurant owner
- Amadeo Arzola as Laird, a vocal protester
- Landall Goolsby as Will
- Robyn Reede as The Irate Woman
- Elise Falanga as Nicolette, a follower of Vernon
- King Orba as Warren, the New Mexico governor's economic advisor
- David Pinter as Antifa Terrorist 1 (Note: Aster said, Everything that's there would tell us that those people are Antifa, whether that means that they're being sent in by the GOP to make it look like Antifa is dangerous, or whether you're on the other side and you believe that George Soros is sending them in. He additionally used "anonymous shooters emerging from the dark" to describe the shooters.)
- Keith Jardine as Antifa Terrorist 2
- Sam Quinn as Protest Leader
- Keith Jardine as Muscular Man
- Daniel Clowes as Frankie Salmone
- Ari Aster as Radio Journalist (uncredited)

== Production ==
"I feel that I've, like... I've lost the dimensions of the bigger world outside of me, and [that] I can only see the dimensions of the smaller world that I believe in. And I think that's a really dangerous thing. And I wanted to make a film about what happens when people who... you know, when nobody can agree on what is fundamentally real, what is happening. What happens when those people come into conflict with each other – you know, a new logic comes out of that."

— Ari Aster, 2025

Aster wrote a script for a contemporary Western film that he had at one point considered making as his directorial debut. He tried to make it for about five years before deciding to make Hereditary and Midsommar first. While promoting his third film, Beau Is Afraid, Aster indicated that his next film would likely be a Western and that he had updated it to take place during the COVID-19 pandemic.

Emma Stone and Christopher Abbott were attached to star in the film in January 2023, and Aster also planned to collaborate with Joaquin Phoenix again for the film. Aster and Phoenix were scouting New Mexico shooting locations in August 2023. In March 2024, Phoenix, Stone, Austin Butler, Pedro Pascal, Luke Grimes, Deirdre O'Connell, Micheal Ward, and Clifton Collins Jr. were added to the cast, and Abbott was no longer attached. The film was produced by Square Peg and A24, who also financed the film with Access Entertainment and IPR.VC.

Filming took place from March through May 2024 in Albuquerque and Truth or Consequences, New Mexico. The water tower with the mural that is shown toward the beginning of the film is the Las Cruces Water Tank.

== Music ==
On April 9, 2025, it was announced that Bobby Krlic would compose the film's score, after previously collaborating with Aster on Midsommar and Beau Is Afraid. On May 7, it was announced that Daniel Pemberton would also be composing the film's score alongside Krlic.

== Release ==
Eddington premiered at the Cannes Film Festival on May 16, 2025. The film also played in Australia at the Sydney Film Festival on June 12, 2025, and at Revelation Perth International Film Festival on July 5, 2025. It also opened 29th Fantasia International Film Festival on July 16, 2025.

Eddington was released in the United States on July 18, 2025. Universal Pictures, through Focus Features, released the film in the United Kingdom on August 22, as well as Nordisk Film releasing the film in Finland on the same day.

It was screened in the 'Best of 2025' section of the 20th Rome Film Festival in October 2025.

On October 30, 2025, the film was showcased at the 38th Tokyo International Film Festival in 'Gala Selection' section.

== Reception ==
=== Box office ===
In the United States and Canada, Eddington was released alongside Smurfs and I Know What You Did Last Summer, and was projected to gross $3–5 million from 2,111 theaters in its opening weekend. The film debuted to $4.3 million and opened in sixth place at the domestic box office. In its second weekend the film made $1.6 million, dropping to eighth place.

=== Critical response ===
On the review aggregator website Rotten Tomatoes, 69% of 286 critics' reviews are positive, with an average rating of 6.5/10. The website's consensus reads: "Eddington carries a stellar cast, fearless direction by Ari Aster and an off-kilter story, but its tonal misdirection will often leave viewers wanting." Metacritic, which uses a weighted average, assigned the film a score of 65 out of 100, based on 50 critics, indicating "generally favorable" reviews. Audiences polled by CinemaScore gave the film an average grade of "C+" on an A+ to F scale.

Brian Tallerico of RogerEbert.com gave the film two and a half stars out of four, saying that the film was "not just about the divisiveness of 2020; it's designed to be divisive itself in 2025. To that end, even if you hate it, it's kind of done its job." David Ehrlich of IndieWire gave the film an A−, praising the film for "vividly" and "uncomfortably" capturing "the day-to-day extent to which our digital future has stripped people of their ability to self-identify their own truths." Justin Chang of The New Yorker wrote that the movie was "a slog, but with ambitions", and criticized the satire and characters, writing that Aster "barely finds them interesting enough to judge, and his boredom proves infectious." Also writing for the New Yorker, Richard Brody sharply criticized film's politics as a mere screen for Aster's interest in sexual humiliation and embarrassment, adding that Aster's treatment of the George Floyd protests was "repellent and sneering". Owen Gleiberman of Variety praised the film's audacity and genre fusion, calling it "a brazenly provocative Western thriller" and highlighting Phoenix's performance as "among his most layered since Joker." Peter Howell of Toronto Star wrote, "It's a satire without laughs. A fright movie without jump scares. A western without an obvious villain. A social commentary minus a moral compass." Kevin Maher of The Times wrote, "The film seems unsure of what it wants to say, if anything, about its central subject. Aster pores over the quirks and waymarks of the pandemic but leaves the actual business of drama and character notably undernourished."

Filmmaker John Waters selected Eddington as the best movie of 2025. Writing for Vulture, he said "My favorite movie of the year is a disagreeable but highly entertaining tale as exhausting as today’s politics with characters nobody could possibly root for. Yet it’s so terrifyingly funny, so confusingly chaste and kinky that you’ll feel coo-coo crazy and oh-so-cultural after watching." Acclaim from other filmmakers includes Derek Cianfrance, Andrew DeYoung, Óliver Laxe, Michael Mann, Joachim Rønning, Sophia Takal, and Adam Wingard.

=== Accolades ===
| Award | Date of ceremony | Category | Recipient(s) | Result | Ref. |
|---|---|---|---|---|---|
| Cannes Film Festival | 24 May 2025 | Palme d'Or | Ari Aster | Nominated | |

== Themes ==
Several critics have noted that Eddington uses the Western genre to explore contemporary American political divisions, conspiracy theories, and pandemic-era paranoia. David Ehrlich of IndieWire described it as "a bleak and brilliant look at post-COVID America."

Aster himself stated, "If I had to boil it down, I’d say Eddington is really just about a data center being built." He elaborated:

From my perspective, a common enemy in the film is the 'distraction.' We’re living in a collapsing system where political battles mesmerize us as big tech and capital seizes everything. What has really happened, which Covid [sic] pushed even further, is that people are powerless in this system and they've been taken away from having any access to changing the world. Control over data and information is the privilege of power, and that works even better if your suspicions and your anger can be displaced onto your neighbor. The old idea of democracy, which is that it would be a countervailing force against power run amok, is gone completely. COVID cut the last link. The pandemic did. And out there is power - big power - and we haven't found the way to deal with it yet. But we're going to have to. And that’s what the characters in Eddington are driving themselves mad trying to do — whether they know it or not.

== Future ==
Aster has stated that a "sort-of" sequel to Eddington is currently in development, called Scapegoat (definition of the word). He later clarified that it's "not a sequel, but there are returning characters."

== See also ==
Political context

- American Left
- Impact of the COVID-19 pandemic
  - COVID-19 pandemic in popular culture
  - Political impact of the COVID-19 pandemic
  - Social impact of the COVID-19 pandemic
- Political polarization in the United States
- Radical right
- Seventh Party System
- United States racial unrest (2020–2023)
- List of changes made due to the George Floyd protests

Related media

- Hemet, or the Landlady Don't Drink Tea, a 2023 film with satirical COVID-19 messaging leading to paranoia between neighbors.
