= Hereditary (soundtrack) =

Hereditary (Original Motion Picture Soundtrack)

Film score by Colin Stetson
- Released: June 8, 2018
- Recorded: 2017–2018
- Genre: Film score
- Length: 71:05
- Label: Milan
- Producer: Colin Stetson; Rob Kleiner

Colin Stetson chronology
Age Out (2018)	Hereditary (2018)	We (2018)

Singles from Hereditary (Original Motion Picture Soundtrack)
- 1. "Funeral" Released: April 5, 2018

Hereditary (Original Motion Picture Soundtrack) is the soundtrack album to the 2018 film Hereditary, directed by Ari Aster. The film score is composed by Canadian-American saxophonist and musician Colin Stetson, who produced the score with singer-songwriter and record producer Rob Kleiner.

Aster contacted Stetson three years before the film's script was under development and intimidated him several times considering his involvement, which was then officially confirmed before early 2017. To set the mood for the film, Stetson wrote much of the cues, so that it could be used as temp tracks while editing the film. Stetson refrained from the conventional writing of horror scores, which involved strings, synths and percussions, and used clarinets and vocals instead, to evoke suspension and tension.

Milan Records released the score album on June 8, 2018, through digital and physical formats. The score was acclaimed by critics, praising Stetson for its experimental and unconventional approach.

== Background ==
Aster contacted Stetson three years prior, telling him that he had been largely influenced by several of Stetson's solo records, while drafting the script, which served him as the muse for the score, and openly contacted him about his involvement. They discussed about the concept and sent him the first draft, which Stetson summarized: "between just Ari's outlook, the concepts he was dealing with, and the way he talks about his work, and the way the script reads, it's just brilliant." This immediately gravitated him to be a part of the film, but was not clear, whether the film would be conceptualized, with Aster intimidating him about the proceedings.

Later, Aster confirmed Stetson's involvement when the film was set to begin production in early 2017. Stetson described Aster as a passionate and clear person on knowing what he wants and has a musical sense to his vocabulary, which had ensured him a smooth working process on the score.

== Composition ==
Stetson began scoring the film during December 2016–January 2017. (Note: as said by Stetson in an interview to Zach Schonfeld of Stereogum.) Since the film's production began during February, Stetson had written most of the music for the script and developing the character of the score, which was ideal for the film. This helped him to establish the mood of the film musically, even before the shooting. Stetson also admitted on replacing temp score as a challenge, where it would be difficult for the editor to replace something that aesthetically contrasts their views. As a result, these pieces were used specifically for the film, as temp tracks that included some orchestral pieces from other albums. This provided him to make it a "concise, cohesive entity of the score" over catering it to different bits and pieces and feel it as a slowly assembled collage. Stetson had written around 85 minutes of music and had spent 16-hours per day for the sessions.

== Recording and production ==
Through their early discussions, Aster wanted the score to feel evil devoid of sentiment and nostalgia, while establishing the character of events and actions that affects the family and refrain from writing conventional themes for particular characters, with the score itself a supporting cast and character in the narrative that interacts with the other characters. It also had to be "tied intrinsically to picture to a degree that it never attracts attention to itself" therefore avoiding themes that were "too conventionally thematic or melodic" as it would deviate from the narrative. Another move he tried to make throughout was to amplify the silence until the sonic character becoming apparent, with the idea of these musical spaces being amplifications of the dread and silence was apparent. Thus, blurring the lines between sound design and music was the key.

Stetson tried to avoid certain ubiquitous tropes and instrumentations which were common while scoring horror films. He avoided the conventional use of strings, synths and creepy percussions, which were utilized to evoke suspension and tension. But as those instruments were commonly used in horror films, he found them to be less effective. As a result, Stetson decided to go ahead with different instruments for developing the soundscape. Stetson admitted that most of the sounds heard were not strings, but instead different instruments being played to sound like strings. He then assembled a big clarinet choir ensemble for the score, as clarinet and voices were the prominent instruments on the score and had obscured to be unrecognizable for new listeners. Much of the clarinets included normal, bass clarinet and b-flat clarinet. He further used brass extensively, along with percussive sounds amplified from woodwinds with keys equipped from microphone. Contrabass clarinets were used to sound like synths and low strings.

== Release ==
The soundtrack was announced by Stetson on April 5, 2018, with the song "Funeral" was released. Milan Records released the album in digital, CD and vinyl LP formats on June 8, 2018. A remix of Stetson's theme "Mourning" by Justin Walker was released on June 22.

== Reception ==
Aggregator Metacritic, which uses a weighted average, assigned Hereditary (Original Motion Picture Soundtrack) a score of 81 out of 100 based on 6 critics, indicating "universal acclaim".

Pieter J Macmillan of Drowned in Sound gave 7/10 and wrote "Hereditary is well worth a listen for a Colin Stetson fan who isn't really into horror films though as it showcases something that his solo releases lack: overdubbing. Stetson's solo releases tend to have the proud disclaimer 'all songs recorded live (no overdubs/loops)' appended to them. Whilst this makes you applaud his amazing chops as he rings several contrasting sounds out of his sax at once, it might make you wish that he'd loosen up a bit and show what he could do with more in the way of overdubs and electronic manipulation. Hereditary shows that when he does loosen up his approach and dabbles in more electronic manipulation he is capable of producing some amazing (and terrifying) sounds." Paul Blinov of Exclaim! also gave the same score and wrote "Plenty of tracks here end abruptly, which likely works well for their use in the film itself, and maybe less so in an independent listen. But even removed from visual and narrative components of Hereditary, Stetson's compositions still manage to conjure a deeply unsettling, unrelentingly tense mood."

Zach Kelly of Pitchfork wrote "Where Stetson's solo albums use dread and paranoia to undercut his careful attention to post-rock's sense of limitless possibility, Hereditary feeds off of his darkest impulses." Thom Jurek of AllMusic wrote "This score is wonderfully effective in its role as a genuinely creepy, even dreadful collection of music for a horror film. But more than this, it's another compelling example of Stetson's seemingly limitless musical vocabulary." A review from The Wire stated, "While visually hereditary is fatally flawed by its failure to frighten, sonically it is as scary as hell." Jonathan Broxton of Movie Music UK wrote "there's something weirdly fascinating about what Stetson is doing here, and as an intellectual exercise it's interesting to actually sit and listen to how he works his clarinets, how he uses his voice to create a multitude of unearthly sounds, and how it all comes together in the end to form a twisted hymn, worshipping at the altar of a vile and corrupted church."

Nick Allen of The Hollywood Reporter noted that the score incorporates trumpets during the film's climax, in reference to the mythology of Paimon being heralded by the sounds of trumpets.

== Track listing ==
Hereditary (Original Motion Picture Soundtrack) track listing
No.	Title	Length
1.	"Funeral"	6:06
2.	"Mothers & Daughters"	3:00
3.	"Brother & Sister"	2:26
4.	"Charlie"	2:56
5.	"Party, Crash"	4:45
6.	"Mourning"	4:45
7.	"Aftermath"	4:22
8.	"Séance Sleepwalking"	4:56
9.	"Second Séance, Pt. 1"	0:57
10.	"Second Séance, Pt. 2"	0:40
11.	"Second Séance, Pt. 3"	1:16
12.	"Classroom"	2:05
13.	"Dreaming"	2:29
14.	"Book Burning"	1:47
15.	"Joanie"	1:47
16.	"Get Out"	1:21
17.	"Leigh's Things"	5:42
18.	"Steve"	8:17
19.	"Peter"	3:40
20.	"Chasing Peter"	0:37
21.	"The Attic"	2:25
22.	"Reborn"	3:51
23.	"Hail, Paimon!"	0:55
Total length:		71:05

== Accolades ==
Award	Date of ceremony	Category	Recipients	Result	Ref.
Fangoria Chainsaw Awards	January 22, 2019	Best Score	Colin Stetson	Nominated	
