= Hereditary (film) =

2018 film by Ari Aster

- Theatrical release poster
- Directed by: Ari Aster
- Written by: Ari Aster
- Produced by: Kevin Frakes; Lars Knudsen; Buddy Patrick
- Starring: Toni Collette; Alex Wolff; Milly Shapiro; Ann Dowd; Gabriel Byrne
- Cinematography: Pawel Pogorzelski
- Edited by: Jennifer Lame; Lucian Johnston
- Music by: Colin Stetson
- Production companies: A24; PalmStar Media; Finch Entertainment; Windy Hill Pictures
- Distributed by: A24
- Release dates: January 21, 2018 (Sundance); June 8, 2018 (United States)
- Running time: 127 minutes
- Country: United States
- Language: English
- Budget: $10 million
- Box office: $90.2 million

Hereditary is a 2018 American supernatural psychological horror film written and directed by Ari Aster in his feature directorial debut. Starring Toni Collette, Alex Wolff, Milly Shapiro, Ann Dowd, and Gabriel Byrne, the film follows Annie Graham (Collette), a grieving miniature artist who uncovers disturbing secrets about her recently deceased mother. She is subsequently tormented by sinister paranormal occurrences, along with her husband Steve (Byrne) and their children, Peter (Wolff) and Charlie (Shapiro).

Aster's work on short horror films, most notably The Strange Thing About the Johnsons, attracted the attention of A24, who greenlit Hereditary as his first feature film. Aster conceived it as primarily a family drama consisting of two distinct halves. Principal photography commenced in Salt Lake City in February 2017, with most of the indoor scenes shot on custom built sets on a soundstage to give the film a dollhouse aesthetic.

Hereditary premiered at the Sundance Film Festival on January 21, 2018, and was theatrically released in the United States on June 8. The film received critical acclaim, with particular praise for Collette's performance, and was a commercial success, grossing $90 million against its $10 million production budget. It is frequently listed as one of the scariest movies ever made.

== Plot ==
Miniatures artist Annie Graham lives in Utah with her psychiatrist husband Steve and their two children, 16-year-old son Peter and 13-year-old daughter Charlie. The family attends the funeral of Annie's estranged mother, Ellen. Annie is surprised by the number of mourners in attendance. After the funeral, Charlie becomes withdrawn and sullen; at school, she beheads a dead bird with scissors and pockets the head. At a bereavement support group, Annie reveals that she and her mother had a strained relationship, though Ellen largely raised Charlie. Meanwhile, Steve learns that Ellen's gravesite has been desecrated, a fact he keeps from Annie.

Peter is invited to a party, and Annie insists that Charlie accompany him. Left unattended, Charlie eats a piece of cake containing walnuts, triggering her severe nut allergy and sending her into anaphylactic shock. As Peter drives Charlie to the hospital, she leans out of the window to gasp for air. Peter swerves to avoid a dead deer in the road, and Charlie is decapitated by a telephone pole. In shock, Peter drives home and leaves Charlie's headless body in Annie's car, which she discovers the next morning.

Following Charlie's funeral, Peter becomes reclusive and guilt-stricken, Annie becomes bitter and resentful toward Peter, and Steve tries to mediate between them. Annie befriends fellow support group member Joan and reveals to her that, while sleepwalking, she once nearly set her children on fire. Joan encourages her to communicate with Charlie's spirit via séance. Annie reacts with skepticism, but Joan demonstrates her own ability to contact her deceased grandson Louie. Joan explains that all members of the family must be present during the séance.

That night, Annie dreams of Peter's head swarming with ants, as Charlie’s was after she died. During the dream, she confesses that her mother pressured her into giving birth to Peter but that she tried to miscarry. She wakes up, then wakes Peter and Steve to conduct the séance. Objects move and Annie speaks in Charlie's voice until Steve throws water on her. As supernatural forces start haunting Peter, Annie suspects Charlie's spirit has become vengeful and demonic. She sees threatening images manifest in Charlie's sketchbook, all involving Peter. When she throws the sketchbook into the fireplace, her clothes catch fire, only to stop burning when she extinguishes the fire.

Annie goes through Ellen's belongings and finds a photo album showing Ellen as "Queen Leigh", the leader of a coven, and Joan as one of her acolytes. Another book describes the demon king Paimon, who brings wealth and knowledge when summoned, but who prefers to inhabit a male host. In the attic, Annie finds Ellen's rotting, headless corpse and occult runes drawn in blood.

While Peter is at school, Joan appears across the street and attempts to expel his spirit from his body for Paimon. In class, Peter is taken over by an unseen force and slams his head against his desk, breaking his nose. Steve brings Peter home and Annie tells Steve about the body in the attic and about Charlie's sketchbook. She begs him to burn it, unable to take her own life. When he refuses, believing Annie has gone insane, she snatches the book and flings it into the fire, only for Steve to burst into flames. Annie watches in horror but is then possessed by the same force that possessed Peter.

As naked coven members gather in and around the house, Peter wakes after dark and finds his father's charred corpse. A possessed Annie pursues Peter through the house, and he takes refuge in the attic. Annie follows him, crawling on walls and floating in the air, then beheads herself with piano wire. Horrified, Peter jumps out of the attic window and hits the ground. A light enters his body, reviving him.

Now displaying Charlie's mannerisms, Peter follows Annie's floating corpse into Charlie's treehouse, where Joan and the other coven members, as well as the headless corpses of his mother and grandmother, are worshipping Charlie's crowned, severed head atop a mannequin. Joan removes the crown, places it on Peter's head, and proclaims him Paimon, telling him the coven has "corrected his female body" and given him his preferred male host. The coven hails Peter as King Paimon.

== Cast ==
- Toni Collette as Annie Graham, a miniature artist
- Gabriel Byrne as Steve Graham, a psychiatrist and Annie's husband
- Alex Wolff as Peter Graham, Annie and Steve's 16-year-old son
- Milly Shapiro as Charlie Graham, Annie and Steve's 13-year-old daughter
- Ann Dowd as Joan, a support group member who befriends Annie
- Mallory Bechtel as Bridget, Peter's schoolmate and love interest

Ari Aster has an uncredited voice cameo as Annie's art dealer, who calls to offer support after the tragedy she has been experiencing. Pat Barnett Carr makes an uncredited appearance as Ellen Leigh, Annie's deceased mother. Aster refers to her as "the sweetest person in the world".

== Production ==
=== Development ===
While studying at the AFI Conservatory, Ari Aster wrote and directed the provocative short horror films The Strange Thing About the Johnsons (2011) and Munchausen (2013), garnering the attention of the production company PalmStar Media when the former film leaked online. He originally pitched Hereditary as a family tragedy, careful not to call it a horror film outright as he worried that it may not be approved for funding if he did so. A fan of domestic dramas, he incorporated themes of the genre into his script as he envisioned a film rooted in family dynamics, trauma, and grief; he named the films Carrie (1976) and The Cook, the Thief, His Wife and Her Lover (1989) as influences on Hereditary. He interpreted the film as two halves which are "completely inextricable from each other" and that the film "begins as a family tragedy and then continues down that path, but gradually curdles into a full-bore nightmare".

The demon king Paimon originates from numerous grimoires, including The Lesser Key of Solomon, Pseudomonarchia Daemonum, Dictionnaire Infernal, Livre des Esperitz, Liber Officiorum Spirituum, and The Book of Abramelin. According to The Lesser Key of Solomon, Paimon is a king of Hell who commands 200 legions of spirits or angels. Paimon is obedient to Lucifer and manifests with a crown on his head, heralded by a "host of spirits, like men with trumpets and well sounding cymbals, and all other sorts of musical instruments".

=== Casting ===
Toni Collette was one of the first actresses Aster sought for the role of Annie Graham. Though she was reluctant to work on a horror film, the script's grounded approach to the genre convinced her to commit to the project and she later said that Aster "just really understood the dynamics in the family, has such an understanding of what it is to be human, what it is to experience loss". Gabriel Byrne agreed to play Steve while Alex Wolff, who previously collaborated with Byrne in the HBO series In Treatment, was cast as Peter. Cast in her cinema debut, 14-year-old Broadway actress Milly Shapiro earned the role of Charlie. After watching Shapiro's audition, Aster was immediately relieved because he had left Charlie's personality more ambiguous than other characters in the script and knew the "chances were slim" that he would find the right actress. Ann Dowd portrays Joan.

=== Filming ===
The film began shooting in Utah in February 2017; the exteriors of the Graham family house and the tree house were shot in Summit County, and the cemetery scene was filmed at Larkin Sunset Gardens in Sandy. The school scenes were shot at West High School and Utah State Fairpark, but all other interiors (including both versions of the treehouse) were built from scratch on a sound stage. Since each room was built on a stage, walls could be removed to shoot scenes at a much greater distance than a practical location would allow, creating the dollhouse aesthetic of the film. Aster later recalled during a Reddit AMA, "Alex Wolff told me not to say the name of William Shakespeare's Scottish play out loud [during filming] because of some superstitious theater legend. I smugly announced the name, and then one of our lights burst during the shooting of the following scene."

=== Editing controversy ===
Discussing the film in an April 2023 interview, producer Lars Knudsen claimed that Aster had intense disagreements with an unnamed financier (later revealed to be producer Kevin Frakes) over final cut privileges: "The experience of making that movie with that financier was really just not pleasant at all. [...] Ari did not have the rights to his own script, right? Like, he didn't have final cut. I came on after all those things happened, so when you have a financier who has final cut, we go out and make the movie, but he's just going to sit back and wait until he gets a director's cut, and then he's going to pounce on it. [...] If I could undo it, I would. But I guess something good came out of it." Aster and Knudsen later co-founded the production company Square Peg.

=== Music ===
The soundtrack was produced by Colin Stetson and Rob Kleiner. Nick Allen of The Hollywood Reporter noted that the score incorporates trumpets during the film's climax, in reference to the mythology of Paimon being heralded by the sounds of trumpets. Judy Collins' 1967 version of Joni Mitchell's "Both Sides, Now" plays during the end credits.

== Release ==
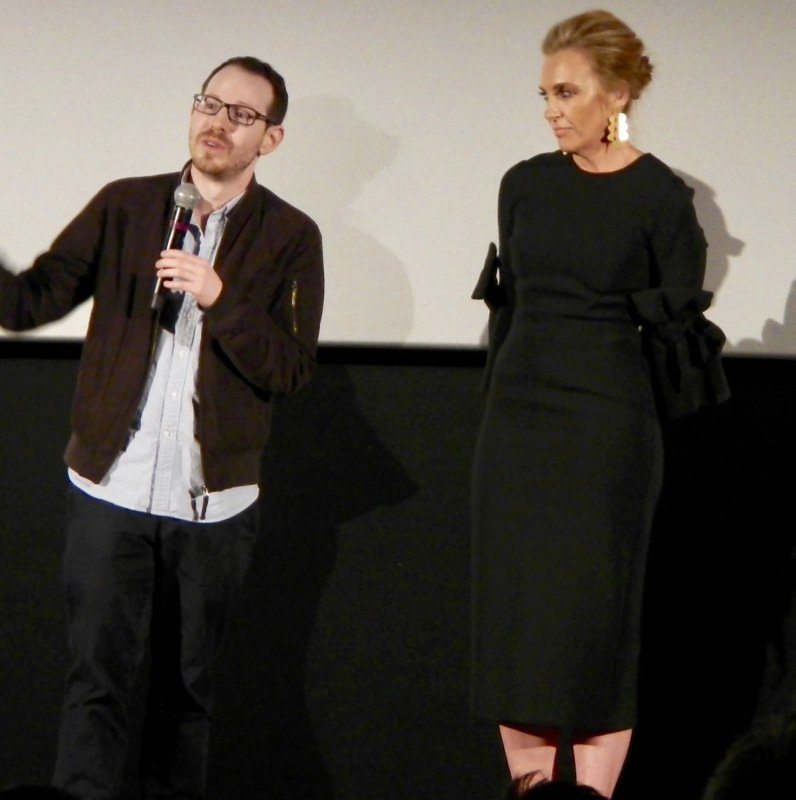
Aster and Collette at Sundance UK, 2018

Hereditary premiered at the Sundance Film Festival on January 21, 2018. The trailer for the film was released on January 30, 2018. On Anzac Day in 2018, the trailer for Hereditary played before the PG-rated family film Peter Rabbit in a cinema in Innaloo, Western Australia. According to a report in The Sydney Morning Herald, the Hereditary preview was accidentally shown to family audiences and created a small panic in the theater. The theater was apparently full of families including "at least 40 children".

The film was released in the United States by A24 on June 8, 2018, and released in the United Kingdom by Entertainment Film Distributors on June 15, 2018.

== Reception ==
=== Box office ===
Hereditary grossed $44 million in the United States and Canada, and $38.8 million in other countries, for a total worldwide gross of $82.8 million, against a production budget of $10 million.

In the United States and Canada, Hereditary was released alongside Ocean's 8 and Hotel Artemis, and was originally projected to gross $5–9 million in its opening weekend, similar to the debuts of previous A24 horror films The Witch ($8.8 million in 2016) and It Comes at Night ($6 million in 2017). It was also the widest-ever release for an A24 film with 2,964 theaters, besting the 2,553 of It Comes at Night. After making $5.2 million on its first day, including $1.3 million from Thursday night previews, weekend estimates were increased to $12 million. It went on to debut to $13.6 million, finishing fourth at the box office, behind Ocean's 8, Solo: A Star Wars Story, and Deadpool 2, and marking the best-ever opening for an A24 title until Civil War surpassed it in 2024. In its second weekend the film dropped just 49.5% to $6.9 million (compared to the 60–70% fall many horror films see in their sophomore frame), finishing sixth. On July 29, 2018, the film became A24's highest-grossing film worldwide at $80 million, beating Lady Bird ($78.5 million); it held the record until June 2022 when it was surpassed by Everything Everywhere All at Once.

=== Critical response ===
On the review aggregator website Rotten Tomatoes, the film holds an approval rating of 90% based on 385 reviews, and an average rating of 8.3/10. The site's critical consensus reads, "Hereditary uses its classic setup as the framework for a harrowing, uncommonly unsettling horror film whose cold touch lingers long beyond the closing credits." On Metacritic, the film has a weighted average score of 87 out of 100, based on 49 critics, indicating "universal acclaim".

Writing for Rolling Stone, Peter Travers gave the film three and a half stars out of four and called it the scariest movie of 2018, saying, "it's Collette, giving the performance of her career, who takes us inside Annie's breakdown in flesh and spirit and shatters what's left of our nerves. Her tour de force bristles with provocations that for sure will keep you up nights. But first, you'll scream your bloody head off." For The A.V. Club, A.A. Dowd gave the film an A−, stating that, "In its seriousness and hair-raising craftsmanship, Hereditary belongs to a proud genre lineage, a legacy that stretches back to the towering touchstones of American horror, unholy prestige-zeitgeist classics like The Exorcist and Rosemary's Baby. Remarkably, it's a first feature, the auspicious debut of writer-director Ari Aster, whose acclaimed, disturbing short films were all leading, like a tunnel into the underworld, to this bleak vision." Common Sense Media gave the film four out of five and advised that it was suitable for viewers aged 17 or older.

In July 2025, it ranked number 83 on Rolling Stone's list of "The 100 Best Movies of the 21st Century" and number 10 on The Hollywood Reporter's list of the "25 Best Horror Movies of the 21st Century."

=== Audience reception ===
Audiences polled by CinemaScore gave the film an average grade of "D+" on an A+ to F scale. Some publications noted the critics-to-audience discrepancy, comparing it to Drive, The Witch, and It Comes at Night, all of which had positive critical reviews, but failed to impress mainstream moviegoers.

=== Accolades ===
Year	Organizations	Category	Nominee(s)	Result	Ref.
2019	AACTA International Awards	Best Actress - International	Toni Collette	Nominated	
2019	Alliance of Women Film Journalists	Bravest Performance	Toni Collette	Nominated	
2018	Boston Society of Film Critics	Best New Filmmaker	Ari Aster	Runner-up	
2018	Chicago Film Critics Association Awards	Best Actress	Toni Collette	Won	
2018	Chicago Film Critics Association Awards	Best Film	Hereditary	Nominated	
2018	Chicago Film Critics Association Awards	Most Promising Filmmaker	Ari Aster	Won	
2019	Critics' Choice Movie Awards	Best Actress	Toni Collette	Nominated	
2019	Critics' Choice Movie Awards	Best Sci-Fi/Horror Movie	Hereditary	Nominated	
2018	Detroit Film Critics Society Awards	Best Actress	Toni Collette	Won	
2019	Fangoria Chainsaw Awards	Best Wide Release	Hereditary	Won	
2019	Fangoria Chainsaw Awards	Best Director	Ari Aster	Won	
2019	Fangoria Chainsaw Awards	Best Actress	Toni Collette	Won	
2019	Fangoria Chainsaw Awards	Best Supporting Actor	Alex Wolff	Won	
2019	Fangoria Chainsaw Awards	Best Supporting Actress	Milly Shapiro	Nominated	
2019	Fangoria Chainsaw Awards	Best Screenplay	Ari Aster	Won	
2019	Fangoria Chainsaw Awards	Best Score	Colin Stetson	Nominated	
2019	Fangoria Chainsaw Awards	Best Kill	"Charlie Meets Telephone Pole"	Won	
2018	Golden Trailer Awards	Best Horror	Hereditary	Nominated	
2018	Golden Trailer Awards	Most Original Trailer	Hereditary	Nominated	
2018	Gotham Awards	Best Actress	Toni Collette	Won	
2018	Gotham Awards	Breakthrough Director	Ari Aster	Nominated	
2018	Gotham Awards	Audience Award	Hereditary	Nominated	
2019	Independent Spirit Awards	Best Female Lead	Toni Collette	Nominated	
2019	Independent Spirit Awards	Best First Feature	Ari Aster, Kevin Frakes, Lars Knudsen and Buddy Patrick	Nominated	
2018	Los Angeles Film Critics Association	Best Actress	Toni Collette	Runner-up	
2018	Neuchâtel International Fantastic Film Festival	Narcisse Award for Best Feature Film	Hereditary	Nominated	
2018	St. Louis Gateway Film Critics Association	Best Actress	Toni Collette	Won	
2018	Washington D.C. Area Film Critics Association Awards	Best Actress	Toni Collette	Nominated	
2018	Washington D.C. Area Film Critics Association Awards	Best Youth Performance	Milly Shapiro	Nominated	

== Future ==
In 2026, Ari Aster revealed that he has a completed script for a prequel but has not found the time to produce the film, stating, "It never feels like the right time. It's a prequel, not a sequel, so I don't know where this goes."
