= Pawel Pogorzelski =

Canadian cinematographer

- Born: 1979 (age 46–47); Włocławek
- Education: Concordia University; American Film Institute Conservatory
- Occupation: Cinematographer

Pawel Pogorzelski (born 1979) is a Polish-Canadian cinematographer, known for his work with director Ari Aster.

Pogorzelski was born in 1979 in Włocławek, Poland but moved to Montreal with his family when he was 2. He studied at Concordia University, receiving an undergraduate degree in media communication. He moved to Los Angeles in 2008, where he studied at the American Film Institute Conservatory.

Pogorzelski garnered critical acclaim for his work on the 2018 psychological horror film Hereditary, directed by Ari Aster. They would work together again on the 2019 film Midsommar, for which he received a nomination for the Independent Spirit Award for Best Cinematography at the 35th Independent Spirit Awards. In 2021, he was the director of photography for the action film Nobody and the Hulu horror film False Positive. In 2023, he served as cinematographer for the DC Comics film Blue Beetle and once again worked with Ari Aster on his surrealist tragicomedy horror film Beau Is Afraid.

== Filmography ==
=== Feature films ===
Year	Title	Director	Notes
2015	Patchwork	Tyler MacIntyre	
2016	We're Still Together	Jesse Noah Klein	
2016	Boost	Darren Curtis	
2017	Tragedy Girls	Tyler MacIntyre	
2018	Hereditary	Ari Aster	
2019	Midsommar	Ari Aster	Nominated - Independent Spirit Award for Best Cinematography
2021	Nobody	Ilya Naishuller	
2021	False Positive	John Lee	
2021	Mona Lisa and the Blood Moon	Ana Lily Amirpour	
2022	Fresh	Mimi Cave	
2023	Beau Is Afraid	Ari Aster	
2023	Blue Beetle	Ángel Manuel Soto	
2025	Holland	Mimi Cave	
2025	The Woman in the Yard	Jaume Collet-Serra	
2027	Karoshi †	Takashi Doscher	Post-production

=== Television ===
Year	Title	Director	Notes
2020	Homemade	Ana Lily Amirpour	Episode "Ride It Out"

=== Short films ===
Year	Title	Director	Notes
2011	The Strange Thing About the Johnsons	Ari Aster	
2013	Munchausen	Ari Aster	
