= Critics' Choice Movie Award for Best Sci-Fi/Horror Movie =

Award given by the Broadcast Film Critics Association

The Critics' Choice Movie Award for Best Sci-Fi/Horror Movie is one of the awards given to people working in the motion picture industry by the Broadcast Film Critics Association at their annual Critics' Choice Movie Awards. It was first given out in 2012 and retired in 2019.

== List of winners and nominees ==
=== 2010s ===
Year	Winner	Director(s)
2012	Looper	Rian Johnson
2012	The Cabin in the Woods	Drew Goddard
2012	Prometheus	Ridley Scott
2013	Gravity	Alfonso Cuarón
2013	Carrie	Kimberly Peirce
2013	The Conjuring	James Wan
2013	Star Trek Into Darkness	J. J. Abrams
2013	World War Z	Marc Forster
2014	Interstellar	Christopher Nolan
2014	The Babadook	Jennifer Kent
2014	Dawn of the Planet of the Apes	Matt Reeves
2014	Snowpiercer	Bong Joon-ho
2014	Under the Skin	Jonathan Glazer
2015	Ex Machina	Alex Garland
2015	It Follows	David Robert Mitchell
2015	Jurassic World	Colin Trevorrow
2015	Mad Max: Fury Road	George Miller
2015	The Martian	Ridley Scott
2016	Arrival	Denis Villeneuve
2016	10 Cloverfield Lane	Dan Trachtenberg
2016	Doctor Strange	Scott Derrickson
2016	Don't Breathe	Fede Álvarez
2016	Star Trek Beyond	Justin Lin
2016	The Witch	Robert Eggers
2017	Get Out	Jordan Peele
2017	Blade Runner 2049	Denis Villeneuve
2017	It	Andy Muschietti
2017	The Shape of Water	Guillermo del Toro
2018	A Quiet Place	John Krasinski
2018	Annihilation	Alex Garland
2018	Halloween	David Gordon Green
2018	Hereditary	Ari Aster
2018	Suspiria	Luca Guadagnino
2019	Us	Jordan Peele
2019	Ad Astra	James Gray
2019	Avengers: Endgame	Joe and Anthony Russo
2019	Midsommar	Ari Aster
