= Danièle Watts =

American actress

- Born: California
- Occupation: Actress

Danièle Watts is an American actress best known for her appearances in the television show Weeds, and as a main cast member on the FX television series Partners.

== Early life and education ==
Danièle Watts was born in California. In middle school, she lived in Orlando, Florida, and in high school, she lived in Atlanta, where she attended the North Springs Charter School of Arts and Sciences. She later attended the University of Southern California in Los Angeles and the British American Drama Academy in London.

== Career ==
On television, she has appeared in singular episodes of How I Met Your Mother, Greek, Cold Case, Detroit 1-8-7, Criminal Minds, Private Practice, 90210, Castle, Melissa & Joey, as well as episodes of Weeds. In 2014, she appeared as a main cast member of the TV series Partners, acting as Martin Lawrence's daughter.

== Controversy ==
In September 2014, Watts and boyfriend Brian Lucas were accused of having sex in a car on a public street. The police were called for a "citizen complaint of indecent exposure" and loud noises. During and after her arrest, Watts claimed she was the subject of racial profiling, due to her boyfriend being white, as she was accused of being a prostitute, and handcuffs leaving her wrist bloodied. The police initially did not charge the couple, but following social media complaints by the couple and the release of audio of the arrest by the police, witnesses stepped forward, alleging lewd conduct. In May 2015, the couple pled no contest to charges of disturbing the peace in exchange for the lewd conduct charges being dropped, and were sentenced to fifteen days of community labor and ordered to write apology letters to the police officers involved in the stop, and to office workers who witnessed a fully clothed Watts sitting on Lucas' lap. After Los Angeles Superior Court Judge Christine Ewell found Watts' letter to the arresting officer to be "insincere", Watts was ordered to write a second letter.

== Filmography ==
=== Films ===
- Magic Al and the Mind Factory (2000, as Ruth)
- Something Like a Business (2010, as Chlamydia)
- Starter Home (2010, as Adalie)
- All Ages (2010, as Jodi)
- Before Dawn Breaks (2011)
- The Strange Thing About the Johnsons (2011, as Marianne)
- Biggz (2011, as Megan)
- The Rhythm Is Gonna Get You (2012, as Danielle)
- Dulce (2012, as Homeless Woman)
- Django Unchained (2012, as Coco)
- You Are What I Want (2012, as Whitney Hinds)
- Straight Down Low (2013, as Amber Adams)
- 420 Gentleman: Rastafari Jamaican (2013)
- Room in LA (2013, as Daniele)
- Wingman Inc. (2013, as Amy)
- The Bloody Indulgent (2014, as Drugged Girl #2)
- ColorLines (2014, as Terri)
- Wave (2014, as Gemma)
- Muted (2014, as Crystal Gladwell)
- Untitled Morgan Krantz Project (2015, filming)
- We Are Family (2015, announced)
- Babysitter (2016 as Anjelika Day)
- Scratch (2017, as Samantha)

=== Television ===
- How I Met Your Mother (2008, 1 episode, as Lori)
- Greek (2009, 1 episode, as Girl)
- Cold Case (2009, 1 episode, as Donalyn Sullivan '91)
- Detroit 1-8-7 (2010, 1 episode, as Shawna Johnson)
- Criminal Minds (2010, 1 episode, as Tracy Anderson)
- Private Practice (2010, 1 episode, as Lola)
- Conan (2011, 1 episode, as Hubbard Daughter in the segment "Tyler Perry's Row 11")
- 90210 (2011, 1 episode, as Hannah)
- Castle (2011, 1 episode, as Rebecca Montgomery)
- Melissa & Joey (2011, 1 episode, as Jessie)
- Weeds (2012, 8 episodes, as Angela Mullen)
- Film Lab Presents (2014, 1 episode, as Mrs. Parks)
- Partners (2014, 10 episodes, as Laura Jackson)
