= Boston Society of Film Critics Awards 2018 =

Annual US film awards ceremony

39th BSFC Awards

December 16, 2018

Best Film:
If Beale Street Could Talk

The 39th Boston Society of Film Critics Awards, honoring the best in filmmaking in 2018, were given on December 16, 2018.

== Winners ==
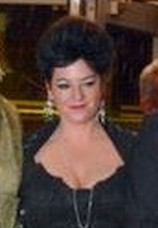
Lynne Ramsay, Best Director winner

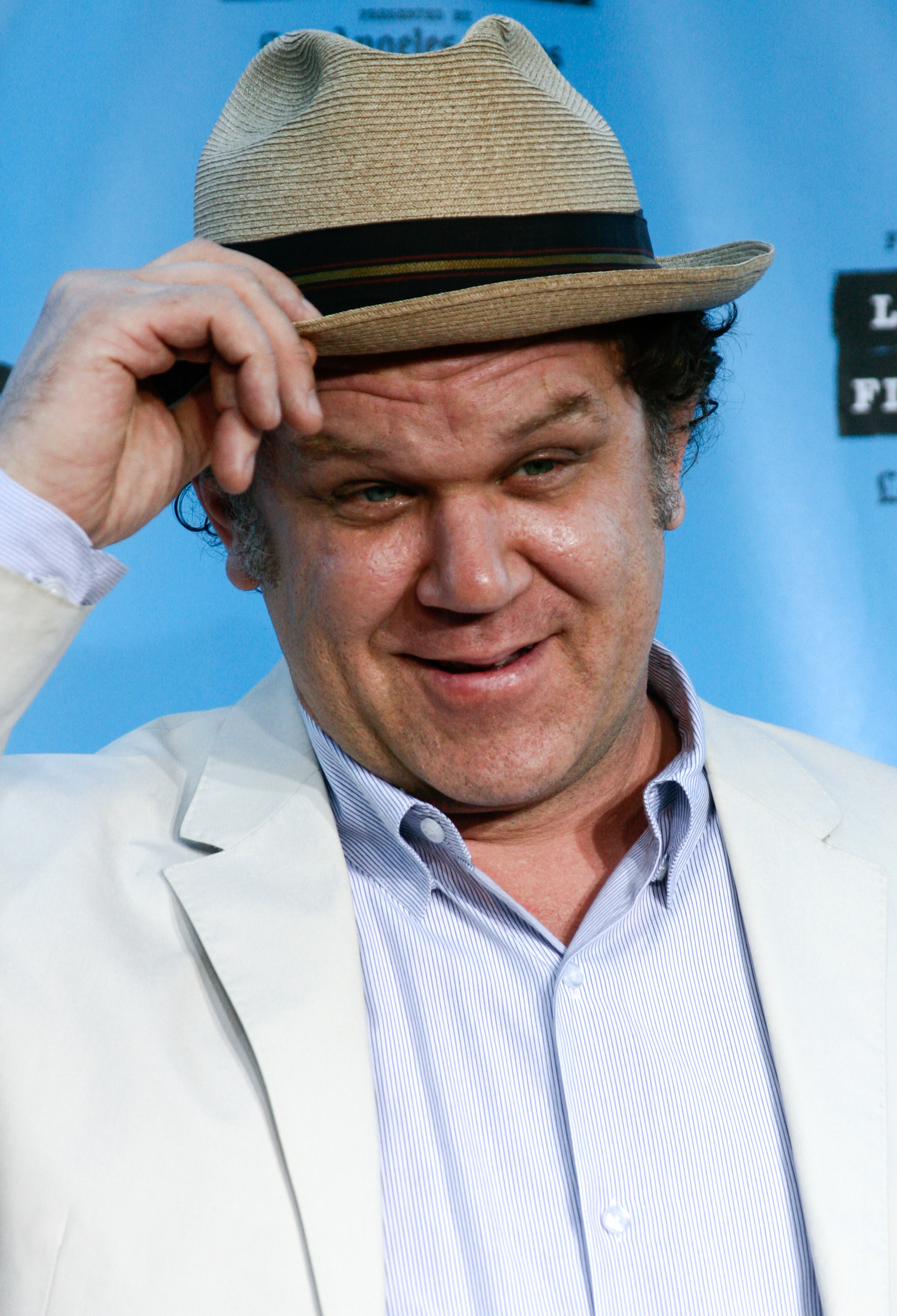
John C. Reilly, Best Actor winner

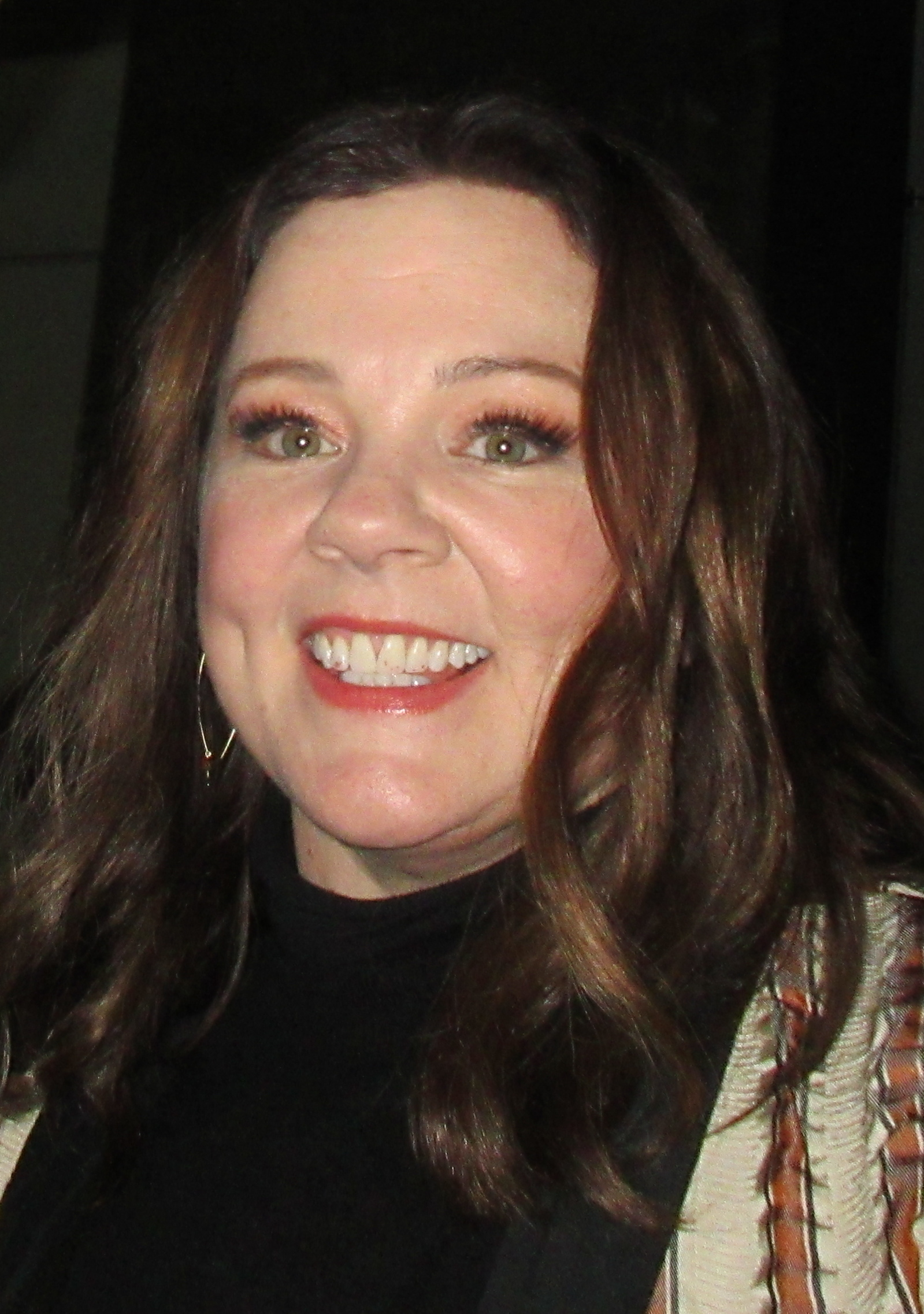
Melissa McCarthy, Best Actress winner

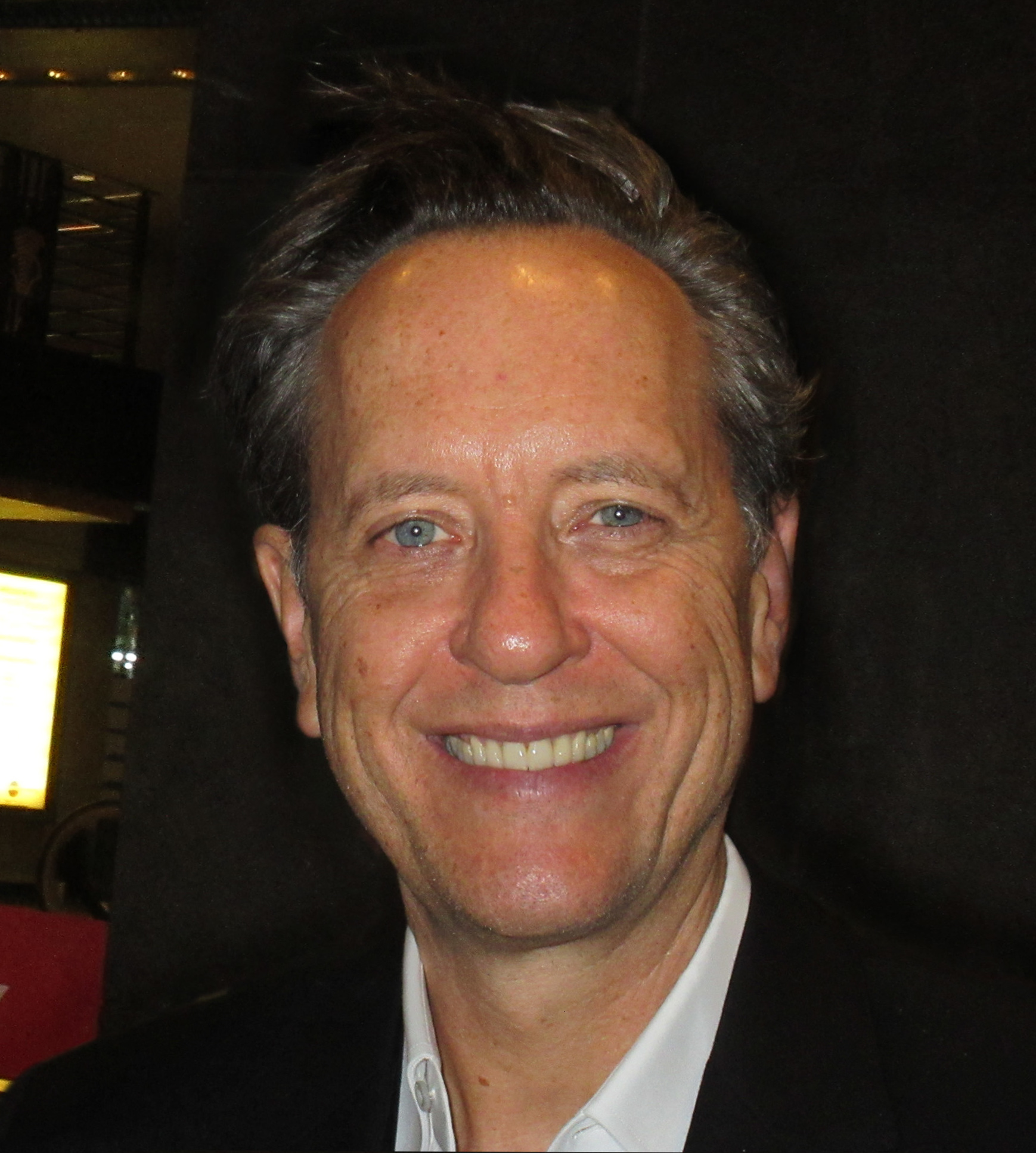
Richard E. Grant, Best Supporting Actor winner

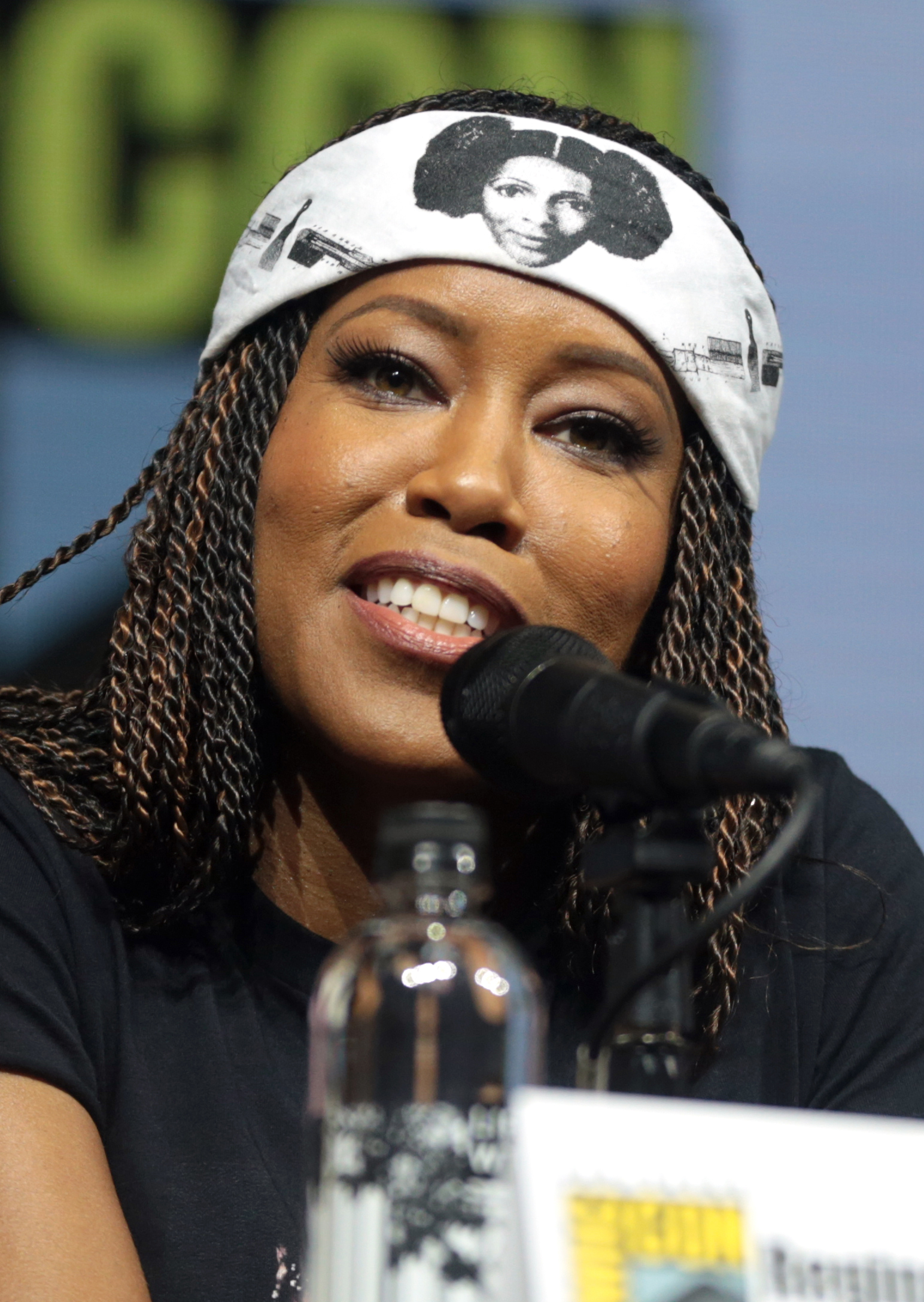
Regina King, Best Supporting Actress winner

- Best Film:
  - If Beale Street Could Talk
  - Runner-up: Shoplifters
- Best Director:
  - Lynne Ramsay – You Were Never Really Here
  - Runner-up: Yorgos Lanthimos – The Favourite
- Best Actor:
  - John C. Reilly – Stan & Ollie
  - Runner-up: Ethan Hawke – First Reformed
- Best Actress:
  - Melissa McCarthy – Can You Ever Forgive Me?
  - Runner-up: Sakura Ando – Shoplifters
- Best Supporting Actor:
  - Richard E. Grant – Can You Ever Forgive Me?
  - Runner-up: Brian Tyree Henry – If Beale Street Could Talk
  - Runner-up: Steven Yeun – Burning
- Best Supporting Actress:
  - Regina King – If Beale Street Could Talk
  - Runner-up: J. Smith-Cameron – Nancy
- Best Screenplay:
  - Nicole Holofcener and Jeff Whitty – Can You Ever Forgive Me?
  - Runner-up: Tamara Jenkins – Private Life
- Best Original Score:
  - Nicholas Britell – If Beale Street Could Talk
  - Runner-up: Justin Hurwitz – First Man
  - Runner-up: Jonny Greenwood – You Were Never Really Here
- Best Animated Film:
  - Isle of Dogs
  - Runner-up: Ralph Breaks the Internet
- Best Foreign Language Film:
  - Shoplifters
  - Runner-up: Cold War
- Best Documentary:
  - Won't You Be My Neighbor?
  - Runner-up: Three Identical Strangers
- Best Cinematography:
  - Alfonso Cuarón – Roma
  - Runner-up: Łukasz Żal – Cold War
- Best Editing:
  - Tom Cross – First Man
  - Runner-up: Bob Murawski and Orson Welles – The Other Side of the Wind
- Best New Filmmaker:
  - Bo Burnham – Eighth Grade
  - Runner-up: Ari Aster – Hereditary
- Best Ensemble:
  - Shoplifters
  - Runner-up: The Favourite
