= Lars Knudsen (producer) =

Danish film producer

- Born: Lars Knudsen; Aarhus, Denmark
- Occupation: Producer
- Years active: 2001–present
- Spouse: Amy BonFleur (m. 2018)
- Children: 4

Lars Knudsen (born January 1, 1986) is a Danish film producer. He is the co-founder of Parts & Labor with Jay Van Hoy and the co-founder of Square Peg with Ari Aster. He is best known for producing the films Ain't Them Bodies Saints, Frank & Lola, The Witch, American Honey and Hereditary.

== Career ==
In 2004, Lars Knudsen and Jay Van Hoy founded the production company Parts & Labor which produced the films Beginners, Ain't Them Bodies Saints, The Witch and Frank & Lola. In 2016, Knudsen and Van Hoy decided to part ways.

On June 20, 2019, Knudsen and director Ari Aster launched their production company Square Peg after their collaboration on the film Hereditary. The company produced Midsommar, Resurrection, The Northman, Beau Is Afraid, Dream Scenario and Sasquatch Sunset.

In May 2026, it was announced that Knudsen and Aster will produce Aster's upcoming film, Scapegoat, through Square Peg, with A24 distributing.

== Filmography ==
Producer

- Gretchen (2005)
- Old Joy (2006)
- Treeless Mountain (2008)
- Lovely, Still (2008)
- I'll Come Running (2008)
- Don't Let Me Drown (2009)
- Stages (2009) (Co-producer) (Documentary film)
- Cold Weather (2010)
- Shit Year (2010) (Role as Colleen's Agent)
- Daylight (2010)
- Beginners (2010)
- Here (2011)
- The Loneliest Planet (2011)
- Intercourses (2013) (Short film)
- Mother of George (2013)
- Ain't Them Bodies Saints (2013)
- Narco Cultura (2013) (Documentary)
- Love Is Strange (2014)
- Loitering with Intent (2014)
- The Witch (2015)
- Scenes from Car 11 (2015) (Miniseries)
- One More Time (2015)
- Klown Forever (2015) (Co-producer)
- Complete Unknown (2016)
- Frank & Lola (2016)
- American Honey (2016)
- Backstabbing for Beginners (2018)
- Hereditary (2018)
- A Vigilante (2018)
- Crossmaglen (2018) (Short film)
- Midsommar (2019)
- Resurrection (2022)
- The Northman (2022)
- Beau Is Afraid (2023)
- Dream Scenario (2023)
- Sasquatch Sunset (2024)
- Rumours (2024)
- Death of a Unicorn (2025)
- Eddington (2025)
- Bugonia (2025)
- The Drama (2026)
- Primetime (2026)
- Untitled Arkasha Stevenson film (TBA)

Executive producer

- Wild Tigers I Have Known (2006)
- The Exploding Girl (2009)
- I Am Secretly an Important Man (2010) (Documentary)
- Exhume (2011) (Short film)
- The Light in the Night (2012) (Short film)
- Keep the Lights On (2012)
- The Heart Machine (2014)
- Brothers (2015) (Short film)
- Little Men (2016)
- Trophy (2017) (Documentary)
- Love After Love (2017)
- From Paradise with Love (2024) (TV movie)
