= Crows Are White =

American Documentary

- Directed by: Ahsen Nadeem
- Written by: Ahsen Nadeem; Matt H. Mayes; Dawn Light Blackman
- Produced by: Ahsen Nadeem; Riel Roch Dector; Sebastian Pardo; Jill Ahrens; Ryan Ahrens; Ben Renzo
- Starring: Ahsen Nadeem
- Cinematography: Matthew Nauser
- Edited by: Weston Currie; Kimberley Hassett
- Music by: Logan Nelson
- Production companies: Argent Pictures; Memory; Square Peg; Family Recipe
- Distributed by: Memory
- Release date: March 11, 2022 (SXSW)
- Running time: 97 minutes
- Countries: United States; Ireland; Japan
- Languages: English; Japanese

Crows Are White is a 2022 documentary film directed by Ahsen Nadeem. It follows Nadeem traveling to a secretive Japanese Buddhist monastery, only to be rejected. The only monk who will help him is a heavy metal loving misfit who prefers ice cream to meditation.

Crows Are White had its world premiere at SXSW on March 11, 2022.

== Synopsis ==
The film tells the story of Ahsen Nadeem, who visits a monastery outside Kyoto in order to film a high-ranking monk perform a dangerous practice that requires practitioners to perform a thousand marathons or commit a ritual suicide.

When he's banned after a mishap, Nadeem breaks the fourth wall and tells the audience about his childhood in Saudi Arabia, where he was raised in a conservative Muslim home. When his family is forced to flee the Gulf War, they uproot to Cavan, Ireland. There, he begins to stray from his Muslim roots and his parents inflict a new code of religious orders, leading to Nadeem lying to his parents and developing a fear of going to hell. He tells the audience that he has a secret that he's kept from his parents for years, and if they found out, would lead to them never speaking again.

At the gift shop, he meets the lowest ranking monk on the mountain, who shares Nadeem's love of music (particularly heavy metal), and dessert. Together, they form an unlikely, years long friendship, which leads to Nadeem confronting his secret, set behind the backdrop of the seven years it takes to complete the Kaihōgyō.

== Release ==
Crows Are White had its premiere at SXSW on March 11, 2022. It was originally set to release in theaters on August 26, 2026 by Memory, but was pulled off the release schedule the day of release.

== Reception ==
On Rotten Tomatoes, it has an approval rating of 100% based on 16 reviews.

David Ehrlich of IndieWire gave it a positive review, while noting that the close perspective invites skepticism about the film's framing, writing: "the last third of Nadeem’s film couldn’t be more dramatic if it were scripted in advance, and yet its Hollywood-worthy ending convincingly validates whatever Nadeem had to do in order to arrange it." Brittany Dennison of Screen Slate was more critical of Nadeem's self-insertion, writing that the film "awkwardly teeters between audacious entitlement and tenderness," and that his "self-interest dominates the film." Kimberley Jones of the Austin Chronicle considered it a ... "sometimes-irritating, often-enthralling picture of faith and the messy ways humans try to reconcile the pursuit of holiness with our pesky earthly desires." Peter Debruge of Variety wrote: "Throughout, the filmmaker presents himself as lazy and undisciplined, awestruck by the monks. But think about what this film represents: years of borderline-obsessive dedication to chronicling a closed religious community, plus the commitment and humility to return after making a fool of himself early on."
