= Breaking the Girls =

- Film poster
- Directed by: Jamie Babbit
- Written by: Mark Distefano; Guinevere Turner
- Produced by: Kirk D'Amico; Andrea Sperling
- Starring: Agnes Bruckner; Madeline Zima
- Cinematography: Jeffrey Waldron
- Edited by: Michael Darrow
- Music by: Mateo Messina
- Production company: Myriad Pictures
- Distributed by: IFC Films
- Release date: November 7, 2012
- Running time: 83 minutes
- Country: United States
- Language: English

Breaking the Girls is a 2012 American crime thriller film directed by Jamie Babbit and starring Agnes Bruckner and Madeline Zima.

== Plot ==
Two college women, Sara and Alex, make a twisted agreement after stress in their personal lives: they will kill each other's archenemies and not be suspected of the murders. As they grow closer, the tension between them turns sexual, and then to something deeper. However, when only one of them goes through with it and begins to set the other up to be framed for murder, she realizes that to stay out of jail, she will have to come up with a plot just as twisted of her own.

== Cast ==
- Agnes Bruckner as Sara Ryan
- Madeline Zima as Alex Layton
- Shawn Ashmore as Eric Nolan
- Kate Levering as Nina Layton
- Shanna Collins as Brooke Potter
- Davenia McFadden as Detective Ross
- Tiya Sircar as Piper Sperling
- Melanie Mayron as Annie
- Manish Dayal as Tim
- Billy Mayo as Jones
- Sam Anderson as Professor Nolan
- John Stockwell as David Layton

== Reception ==
On review aggregator Rotten Tomatoes, the film holds an approval rating of 10% based on 10 reviews, with an average rating of 4.74/10. On Metacritic, the film has a weighted average score of 42 out of 100, based on 8 critics, indicating "mixed or average" reviews. Steven Boone of RogerEbert.com gave the film two and a half stars. Andrew Schenker of Slant Magazine gave the film one and a half stars out of four.
