= Dream Scenario =

2023 film by Kristoffer Borgli

- Theatrical release poster
- Directed by: Kristoffer Borgli
- Written by: Kristoffer Borgli
- Produced by: Lars Knudsen; Ari Aster; Tyler Campellone; Jacob Jaffke; Nicolas Cage
- Starring: Nicolas Cage; Julianne Nicholson; Michael Cera; Tim Meadows; Dylan Gelula; Dylan Baker
- Cinematography: Benjamin Loeb
- Edited by: Kristoffer Borgli
- Music by: Owen Pallett
- Production companies: A24; Square Peg; Saturn Films
- Distributed by: A24
- Release dates: September 9, 2023 (TIFF); November 10, 2023 (United States)
- Running time: 102 minutes
- Country: United States
- Language: English
- Box office: $12.4 million

Dream Scenario is a 2023 American surreal satirical comedy drama film written, directed, and edited by Kristoffer Borgli. It stars Nicolas Cage as a mild-mannered university professor whose life is thrown into turmoil when people begin telling him that he keeps appearing in their dreams. Julianne Nicholson, Michael Cera, Tim Meadows, Dylan Gelula, and Dylan Baker also star. The film was produced by Ari Aster, Lars Knudsen, Cage, Jacob Jaffke, and Tyler Campellone.

Dream Scenario premiered at the Toronto International Film Festival on September 9, 2023, and began a limited theatrical release by A24 on November 10 before expanding on November 22. It grossed $12.4 million at the box office and received positive reviews, being nominated for awards such as a Golden Globe Award for Best Actor – Motion Picture Musical or Comedy for Cage.

== Plot ==
Sophie, a teenage girl, has a dream in which she sees a man raking leaves by a swimming pool. She suddenly starts floating up to the sky and cries out to the man for help, revealing that he is her father Paul, a professor of evolutionary biology at a local university.

When Paul learns that a former colleague is writing an article on a topic he had discussed with her many years earlier, he seeks to confront her but instead begs her for some recognition. Paul's journalist ex-girlfriend Claire spots him with his wife Janet and tells him he appears in her dreams. With his permission, she writes an article about the experience. Soon, hundreds of strangers come forward to name Paul as the man they see in their dreams. Paul enjoys the media coverage this brings, but is frustrated by consistently being depicted in the dreams as passive and uninteresting. In interviews with some of his students, he learns that their dreams sometimes feature disasters occurring or the dreamers asking Paul for help, only for him to remain emotionless and unhelpful.

Janet asks Paul why he does not appear in her dreams, and describes her fantasy of Paul rescuing her while wearing the oversized suit worn by David Byrne in the 1984 Talking Heads concert film Stop Making Sense. Later that evening, a mentally ill man who has seen Paul in his dreams breaks into their house with a knife, raising concerns about the risks of his fame. Paul meets with a PR firm in the hopes of securing a book deal, but they instead attempt to convince him to advertise Sprite on social media. Molly, a young assistant at the firm, tells Paul that she has erotic dreams about him; he attempts to re-enact them for her, but prematurely ejaculates and leaves her apartment in shame.

Paul is enraged to learn that his former colleague has published a high-profile paper on the subject about which he was thinking of writing his book. His presence in people's dreams becomes violent and sadistic, and he becomes vilified, being placed on leave after students refuse to attend his classes. Bystanders are bothered by his presence in public, resulting in a brawl at a diner. After Janet's career is affected, she asks Paul to issue a public apology, but he angrily refuses. Paul has a nightmare in which he is hunted and killed by a version of himself wielding a crossbow and subsequently releases a self-pitying apology video. Humiliated, Janet throws him out of the house. Paul forces his way into his daughter's school play but accidentally injures a teacher in the process and is restrained, becoming further vilified.

Some time later, Paul ceases to appear in people's dreams. His own dream experience is revealed to have led to the discovery of a shared subconsciousness, and dreams have become an advertising space through the use of technology. Janet separates from Paul and is dating a co-worker. Paul travels to France for a book tour to promote his book Dream Scenario, which he learns has been retitled Je suis ton cauchemar (I Am Your Nightmare) without his consent. The book is pitifully thin in the translated volume and his signing event has been moved to the dingy basement of the bookstore. Nevertheless, fans line up for his signed copies. Paul uses "dream travel" technology to enter one of Janet's dreams and rescue her while wearing an oversized suit. As he floats away, much like Sophie did in her first dream, Paul declares that he wishes the dream were reality.

== Cast ==
- Nicolas Cage as Paul Matthews, a meek college professor
- Julianne Nicholson as Janet Matthews, Paul's wife
- Michael Cera as Trent, the head of a viral marketing firm
- Tim Meadows as Brett, the dean of Paul's college
- Dylan Gelula as Molly, Trent's assistant
- Dylan Baker as Richard, a colleague of Paul
- Kate Berlant as Mary, Trent's business partner
- Marnie McPhail as Claire, a journalist and Paul's ex-girlfriend
- Lily Bird as Sophie Matthews, Paul's daughter
- Jessica Clement as Hannah Matthews, Paul's daughter
- David Klein as Andy, Paul's student
- Cara Volchoff as Candice, a therapist
- Noah Centineo as Dylan
- Nicholas Braun as Brian Berg
- Amber Midthunder as Haley
- Lily Gao as a realtor

== Production ==
A24 announced the film in August 2022, with Nicolas Cage, Julianne Nicholson, Michael Cera, Tim Meadows, Kate Berlant, Dylan Baker and Dylan Gelula to be included in the cast.

Principal photography commenced in Toronto in October 2022 and wrapped that November.

The movie was shot on analogue 16 mm (Super 16) film with the Arriflex 416 Plus camera before being transferred to a 4k digital intermediate in postproduction.

== Release ==
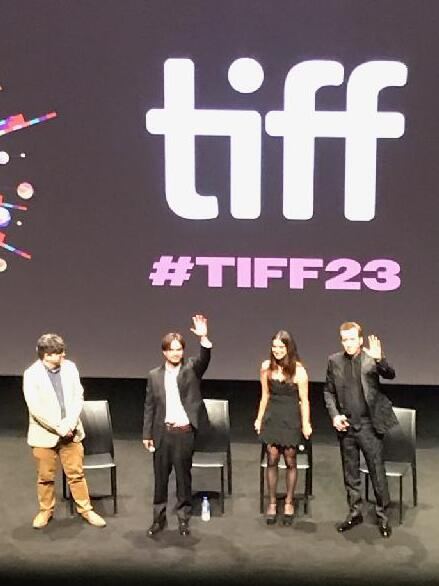
Dream Scenario premiering at the 2023 Toronto International Film Festival

Dream Scenario premiered as the opening film in the Platform Prize program at the Toronto International Film Festival on September 9, 2023. A24 distributed it in the United States with a limited release on November 10, 2023, followed by an expanded release on November 22. Distribution in Canada, New Zealand and Australia was handled by VVS Films.

== Reception ==
On the review aggregator website Rotten Tomatoes, 91% of 233 critics' reviews are positive, with an average rating of 7.5/10. The website's consensus reads: "Come to Dream Scenario for career-highlight work from Nicolas Cage—and leave mulling over everything it has to say about pop culture's fickle whims." Metacritic, which uses a weighted average, assigned the film a score of 74 out of 100, based on 47 critics, indicating "generally favorable" reviews.

Kyle Smith of The Wall Street Journal called the film "a bold statement that is bound to make a name" for Borgli. Peter Bradshaw, in his review of the film in The Guardian, called it "very enjoyable" and a "smart film about the uncanny experience of fame." Peter Debruge of Variety noted that "Borgli shoots the dreams no different from the waking moments, creating a kind of mind game for audiences, who must determine at any given moment whether the scene in question is real or imagined."

Jeannette Catsoulis of The New York Times wrote that the film is "often funny and frequently surreal" but said that Borgli had "more ideas than space to execute them," leading to a third act that feels "overloaded and indecisive of where it wants to land." Catsoulis also wrote that the erotic scene between Paul and Molly "could make you want to put your eyes out."

Ann Hornaday of The Washington Post wrote that the film was a “clever, adroitly executed taxonomy of contemporary fame.” Yet, Hornaday followed up with some criticism of the film's screenwriting. “The more far-out Dream Scenario gets, the more viewers might wish that Borgli would simply keep his focus on the warp and woof of the Matthewses' marriage."

Filmmakers Joe Dante, Chloe Domont, Chad Hartigan, Matt Johnson and Karyn Kusama all cited Dream Scenario as among their favorite films of 2023.

== Accolades ==
Awards and nominations for Dream Scenario
Award	Date of ceremony	Category	Nominee(s)	Result	Ref.
Critics' Choice Super Awards	April 4, 2024	Best Actor in a Horror Movie	Nicolas Cage	Won	
Golden Globe Awards	January 7, 2024	Best Actor in a Motion Picture – Musical or Comedy	Nicolas Cage	Nominated	
Satellite Awards	February 18, 2024	Best Motion Picture – Comedy or Musical	Dream Scenario	Nominated	
Satellite Awards	February 18, 2024	Best Actor in a Motion Picture – Comedy or Musical	Nicolas Cage	Nominated	
Saturn Awards	February 2, 2025	Best Independent Film	Dream Scenario	Nominated	
Saturn Awards	February 2, 2025	Best Actor in a Film	Nicolas Cage	Won	
