= Munchausen (2014 film) =

Short film by Ari Aster

- Film poster
- Directed by: Ari Aster
- Written by: Ari Aster
- Produced by: Alejandro De Leon
- Starring: Bonnie Bedelia; Liam Aiken; Rachel Brosnahan
- Cinematography: Pawel Pogorzelski
- Edited by: Arndt Peemoeller
- Music by: Daniel Walter
- Release date: June 27, 2014 (American Film Institute)
- Running time: 16 minutes
- Country: United States
- Language: Silent film

Munchausen is a 2014 American silent short horror film written and directed by Ari Aster. The film stars Liam Aiken as a boy about to go off to college, and Bonnie Bedelia as his overprotective mother who goes to great lengths to keep him from leaving her.

The film is named for the phenomenon of Munchausen syndrome by proxy, "a behavior pattern in which a caregiver deliberately exaggerates, fabricates, and/or induces physical, psychological, behavioral, and/or mental health problems in those who are in their care."

== Plot ==
A boy is packing his things for college as his mother looks on, imagining his future away from home. She imagines herself running after the boy's car as he leaves for college. In her imagination, the boy becomes an ace student and a champion of his school's debate team, where he meets a girl who falls for him. After he graduates, he proposes to the girl. The mother imagines herself tending her bright, colorful garden, and finding a superhero figure her son used to play with, reminding her that she misses him very much. The film then returns to the present as the son packs his boxes.

To keep her son from leaving her too soon, the mother poisons his food with a substance called "Feel-Bad Sickness Prompter". The boy eats his food without any problems, and falls very ill that night. However, the substance works too well, and the son wakes his mother up moaning from horrible cramps. A doctor comes to examine the sick boy, but cannot determine exactly what's wrong. The mother attempts to cure her son by putting "Feel-Good Again Miracle Antidote" in his soup, but the son is unable to eat it. The doctor visits again, and the son has only gotten worse; his body is wracked by horrific spasms as his mother cries, but the boy tries to reassure her before suddenly collapsing and dying.

At the boy's funeral, the mother chases after her son's casket in much the same fashion as she imagined herself chasing his car. The film closes on a shot of the mother's garden, now withered and dead, with the superhero figure in the center.

== Cast ==
- Bonnie Bedelia as Mother
- Liam Aiken as Boy
- Rachel Brosnahan as Girl
- Richard Riehle as Doctor
- David Purdham as Father

== Production ==
After making The Strange Thing About the Johnsons and Beau in 2011, writer-director Aster and producer De Leon were inspired by the films of Pixar, especially the poignant opening montage of Up. The duo re-teamed with cinematographer Pawel Pogorzelski to make Munchausen, and started a successful crowdfunding campaign for the film in 2012 with the help of several collaborators at AFI, which raised $16,175.

== Release ==
The film premiered unfinished at Fantastic Fest on September 23, 2013, before being released in a limited screening at the American Film Institute on June 27, 2014. It was then released globally by Vice Shorts on February 21, 2015.
