= Partners (2014 TV series) =

- Genre: Sitcom
- Created by: Robert L. Boyett; Robert Horn
- Starring: Kelsey Grammer; Martin Lawrence; Rory O'Malley; Edi Patterson; Telma Hopkins; Danièle Watts; McKaley Miller
- Theme music composer: Jared Gutstadt
- Opening theme: "Mama Said She Didn't Raise No Fool" by Jingle Punks
- Composer: Bennett Salvay
- Country of origin: United States
- Original language: English
- No. of seasons: 1
- No. of episodes: 10

Production
- Executive producers: Robert L. Boyett; Brian Sher; Kelsey Grammer; Martin Lawrence; Michael Green; Robert Horn; Sam Maydew; Stella Bulochnikov
- Camera setup: Multi-camera
- Running time: 21-22 minutes
- Production companies: Robert L. Boyett Productions; Robert Horn Productions; Runteldat Productions; Grammnet Productions; Lionsgate Television

Original release
- Network: FX
- Release: August 4 – September 1, 2014

Partners is an American sitcom starring Kelsey Grammer and Martin Lawrence that aired on FX. The show centers on two Chicago lawyers from vastly different backgrounds who develop a partnership after they unexpectedly meet in court on the worst day of their lives. This was Lawrence's first TV series since his eponymous Fox series ended its five-season run in 1997.

FX ordered 10 episodes of the sitcom and, if the series had done well over its first 10-episode run, the network would have ordered an additional 90 episodes. The sitcom premiered on August 4, 2014, and was cancelled after its one season.

== Cast ==
- Kelsey Grammer as Allen Braddock: a hotshot lawyer fired from his own father's firm
- Martin Lawrence as Marcus Jackson: a community activist going through a divorce
- Rory O'Malley as Michael: Marcus's ambivalent gay assistant
- Edi Patterson as Veronica: investigator for Allen and Marcus's law firm
- Telma Hopkins as Ruth Jackson: Marcus's mother
- Danièle Watts as Laura Jackson: Marcus's daughter
- McKaley Miller as Lizzie Braddock: Allen's step-daughter

== Production ==
It was announced that the series would be filmed in Los Angeles. The original working titles were The Partnership and Braddock & Jackson.

== Episodes ==
No.	Title	Directed by	Written by	Original release date	Production code	US viewers (millions)
1	"They Come Together"	Kelsey Grammer	Robert L. Boyett & Robert Horn	August 4, 2014	1003	1.12
2	"Let's Have a Simple Gwedding"	Joe Regalbuto	Robert Horn	August 4, 2014	1006	1.01
3	"Another Man's Wingtips"	Joe Regalbuto	Bob Keyes & Doug Keyes	August 11, 2014	1007	0.862
4	"Who's Your Mama?"	Steve Zuckerman	Jeanette Collins & Mimi Friedman	August 11, 2014	1004	0.669
5	"Jurist Prudence"	Steve Zuckerman	Warren Hutcherson	August 18, 2014	1005	0.446
6	"Paralegal Activity"	Rich Correll	David Love	August 18, 2014	1002	0.384
7	"The Curious Case of Benjamin Butt-Ugly"	Rich Correll	Allan Rice	August 25, 2014	1001	0.648
8	"The Law School Reunion"	Kelsey Grammer	David Arnold	August 25, 2014	1010	0.555
9	"Doug Day Afternoon"	Rich Correll	Larry Mintz & Bob Griffard	September 1, 2014	1008	0.779
10	"How to Get a Head in Advertising"	Rich Correll	Les Firestein	September 1, 2014	1009	0.749
