= The Strange Thing About the Johnsons =

2011 short film by Ari Aster

- Promotional poster
- Directed by: Ari Aster
- Written by: Ari Aster
- Produced by: Alejandro De Leon
- Starring: Billy Mayo; Brandon Greenhouse; Angela Bullock
- Cinematography: Pawel Pogorzelski
- Edited by: Brady Hallongren
- Music by: Brendan Eder
- Release date: January 22, 2011
- Running time: 29 minutes
- Country: United States
- Language: English

The Strange Thing About the Johnsons is a 2011 American psychological horror short film written and directed by Ari Aster. The film stars Billy Mayo, Brandon Greenhouse, and Angela Bullock as members of a suburban family in which the father is trapped in a one-sided incestuous relationship with his abusive son.

The short was Aster's thesis film while studying at the AFI Conservatory, and later screened at film festivals in 2011, premiering at the Slamdance Film Festival in Utah on January 22, before it leaked online in November and went viral. Aster conceived the story while discussing taboos with his friends, including Greenhouse, before his first year at AFI. He worked on the production with fellow students from the school.

The Strange Thing About the Johnsons received polarized reviews from critics and audiences. Many were divided on the film's controversial themes, although Mayo and Bullock received widespread acclaim for their performances.

== Plot ==
In 1995, acclaimed poet Sidney Johnson accidentally interrupts his 12-year-old son Isaiah masturbating. He apologizes and reassures Isaiah that the act is natural, unaware that Isaiah was masturbating to a photograph of Sidney as a young man.

In 2009, during Isaiah's wedding to his wife Marianne, Sidney's wife, Isaiah's mother Joan, discovers Isaiah secretly performing oral sex on a distressed Sidney. Despite being disturbed, Joan tries to regain her composure. That night, while Joan is in the shower, Sidney leaves a typed memoir underneath Joan's pillow called Cocoon Man: Confessions by Sidney Johnson. The memoir chronicles Sidney's experience of being incestuously abused by his son. Isaiah discovers it and threatens him not to print any more copies. After a New Year's Eve party in 2010, Isaiah lashes out at Marianne.

That night, while Sidney is listening to a self-help tape in the bath, Isaiah breaks down the door and rapes him. Joan hears Sidney's screams but ignores them. The next day, Sidney attempts to leave the house with a secret copy of Cocoon Man but is led into another confrontation with Isaiah, who gaslights him about their relationship. Sidney runs out into the street, where he is struck and killed by an oncoming van.

After Sidney's funeral, Joan decides to confront Isaiah, speculating that the abuse began 10 years ago during his prom night as she remembers Sidney crying for hours after it. Isaiah tells Joan that she is delusional and she calls him Sidney's killer, causing him to lash out and tell Joan that he loved Sidney better than she ever did. Isaiah attempts to strangle Joan, only for her to stab him with a knife. He then tries forcing her head into the fireplace but she stabs him to death with a fire iron, throws the copy of Cocoon Man into the fire, and sobs as she watches it burn.

== Cast ==
- Billy Mayo as Sidney Johnson, an acclaimed poet and Joan's husband
- Brandon Greenhouse as Isaiah Johnson, the son of Sidney and Joan
  - Carlon Jeffery as Young Isaiah
- Angela Bullock as Joan Johnson, Sidney's wife and Isaiah's mother
- Stanley Bennett Clay as Howard
- Connie Jackson as Grace
- Danièle Watts as Marianne, Isaiah's wife

== Production ==
Work on the project began during Aster's time at the AFI Conservatory film school, where he made it his thesis film. The idea behind the film had arisen from a discussion with some friends about taboo topics during the summer preceding his first year at AFI. Greenhouse, who plays Isaiah, had previously worked on projects with Aster and was there since the idea's conception. He said, "We were talking about topics that are too taboo to be explored, and so we arrived at taboos that weren't even taboos because they were so unfathomable, and the most popular was that of a son molesting his father."

The film was shot on 35 mm. Aster called the screenplay "a bit of an uphill battle to make it there politically". He said, "I was at AFI, which is a kind of industry school. They're very Hollywood-oriented and they want to train you to become a Hollywood filmmaker, and the films they show the incoming fellows are very politically correct ... Oscar movies. And I just thought, what's the worst thing I can make at AFI? ... To ask, what can't I do? And why can't I do it? Oh, a son raping his dad, we should make that a movie. And then to figure out what makes that palatable and how to make that work."

== Reception ==
After the short film was released online, it went viral, garnering a polarized reaction due to its controversial themes. Ivan Kander of the website Short of the Week wrote that the comments on YouTube had "everything from effusive acclaim to disgusted vitriol" which "in terms of the internet, means it's a hit".

The film also garnered controversy for its portrayal of an African-American family by a white filmmaker. Aster responded, "The color of the family isn't important. We certainly assumed that casting black actors in a film that tackles such transgressive themes would create something of a stir, and it would be a lie to say that we weren't hesitant, especially as many people were advising us against the decision."

Malcolm Harris, an African-American survivor of incest and child sexual abuse, wrote in The Huffington Post that Mayo's performance was "brilliant". He wrote, "We should be applauding the fact that someone has finally shown true courage in proposing the question, 'What if? What if these strange events were happening behind the closed doors of the Smiths, the Rosenbergs, the Mortimers, the Herreras? What if these strange things were happening to me?'"
