= Square Peg (production company) =

American film and television production company

- Type: Private
- Industry: Film; Television
- Founded: June 20, 2019; 7 years ago
- Founder: Ari Aster; Lars Knudsen
- Headquarters: New York City, New York, United States
- Key people: Ari Aster; Lars Knudsen; Emily Hildner (Head of TV); Tyler Campellone (producer)

Square Peg (stylized in all caps) is an American production company co-founded by American filmmaker Ari Aster and Danish film producer Lars Knudsen. The company formed in 2019 and has produced over a dozen films and television shows. Square Peg primarily focuses on auteur-driven projects, including most of Aster's movies and those of Kristoffer Borgli (Dream Scenario and The Drama), Robert Eggers (The Northman), and Yorgos Lanthimos (Bugonia).

== History ==
Aster and Knudsen first met to collaborate on Aster's 2018 directorial debut, Hereditary, with Knudsen producing. The two then launched Square Peg in 2019, just before the July release of Midsommar (2019), which Aster wrote and directed and Knudsen produced. At that time, the duo had "already begun putting together a slate with emerging artists" and were working toward Aster's next film, Beau Is Afraid (2023), along with plans to eventually branch into television.

In March 2021, it was announced that Square Peg had entered a two-year, first-look television deal with entertainment company A24, with Emily Hildner joining Square Peg as Head of TV.

While Beau Is Afraid was in theaters, Square Peg also had two other projects in post-production. The company planned to develop three to four feature films per year. At that time, Square Peg was also moving into the TV space, developing several adaptations, including those for J. G. Ballard's The Drowned World, the Japanese horror anime Uzumaki, and Nick Dranso's novel Acting Class.

In April 2023, Square Peg was made up of a five-person staff.

In February 2024, it was reported that Square Peg would produce James M. Johnston's feature directorial debut, a Ultimate Fighting Championship (UFC)-inspired drama called Strawweight. Lupita Nyong'o and Chloë Grace Moretz were attached to star in the film.

In May 2024, it was reported that Focus Features had acquired the film rights to Yorgos Lanthimos' Bugonia (2025), a film produced by Lanthimos, along with Square Peg and several other production companies: Element Pictures, Fruit Tree, and CJ ENM. The film would go on to receive four Oscar nominations: Best Picture, Best Actress (for Emma Stone), Best Adapted Screenplay, and Best Original Score.

In August 2024, it was announced that Square Peg would produce The Drama (2026) in another collaboration with Norwegian filmmaker Kristoffer Borgli and A24. The film would star Zendaya and Robert Pattinson.

In October 2024, it was announced that documentary filmmaker Lance Oppenheim was moving into fiction for his next project, Primetime (2026), through A24. Robert Pattinson would star in and produce the film, along with Square Peg and Range.

In March 2026, it was reported that Square Peg had signed a two-year, first-look deal with independent studio Media Res to develop and produce series projects.

In July 2026, it was reported that Square Peg would produce Ahsen Nadeem's debut film, Crows Are White, marking the company's first documentary film.

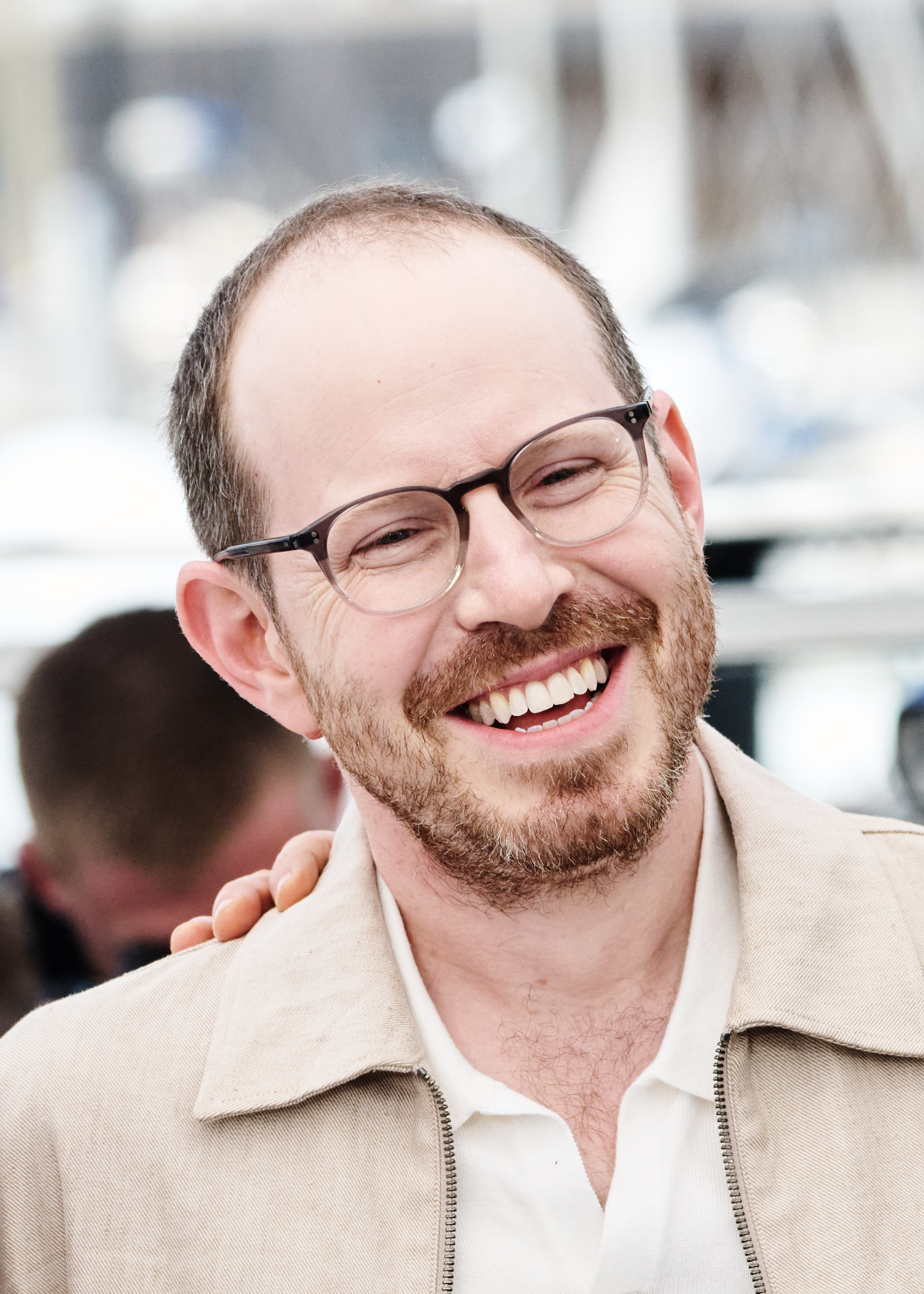
Ari Aster in 2025

=== Square Peg Social ===
In May 2025, Aster and Knudsen unveiled Square Peg Social (SPS), a mentorship initiative to bring together "seasoned filmmakers and industry professionals to help and nurture a new generation of filmmakers". From October 23 to 26, 2025, the inaugural Square Peg Social event took place in Austin, Texas. In attendance were 26 writer-directors, 9 producers, and 27 industry mentors.

In May 2026, it was announced that a second edition of SPS would be held in Austin from September 17 to 21, 2026. Submissions opened in June 2026 via FilmFreeway.

== Filmography ==
Key
†	Denotes a film currently showing in theatres

=== Released ===
Release date	Title	Director(s)	Distributor(s)	Ref.
July 3, 2019	Midsommar	Ari Aster	A24	
April 22, 2022	The Northman	Robert Eggers	Focus Features	
July 29, 2022	Resurrection	Andrew Seamans	IFC Films; Shudder	
April 14, 2023	Beau Is Afraid	Ari Aster	A24	
November 10, 2023	Dream Scenario	Kristoffer Borgli	A24	
April 12, 2024	Sasquatch Sunset	Nathan Zellner, David Zellner	Bleecker Street	
October 18, 2024	Rumours	Guy Maddin, Evan Johnson, Galen Johnson	Bleecker Street	
March 28, 2025	Death of a Unicorn	Alex Scharfman	A24	
July 18, 2025	Eddington	Ari Aster	A24	
October 24, 2025	Bugonia	Yorgos Lanthimos	Focus Features	
April 3, 2026	The Drama	Kristoffer Borgli	A24	
September 25, 2026	Primetime	Lance Oppenheim	A24	

=== Undated films ===
Title	Director(s)	Distributor(s)	Ref.
Crows Are White	Ahsen Nadeem	Memory	
Enemies	Henry Dunham	A24	
The Guest	Lorene Scafaria	A24	
Jonty	Lorene Scafaria	A24	
Schiller Park	Conner O'Malley	—N/a	
Strawweight	James M. Johnston (feature directorial debut)	—N/a	
Gummy	Michael Cera	—N/a	
Untitled horror film	Arkasha Stevenson	A24	
Antarctica	Don Hertzfeldt	A24	
Bushido	Hiro Murai (feature directorial debut)	A24	
Untitled Death Stranding film	Michael Sarnoski	A24	
Hansel & Gretel	Cristobal León, Joaquín Cociña	A24	
The Looming	Masha Ko	A24	
The Confessions	Guy Maddin, Galen Johnson, Evan Johnson	—N/a	
The Week of Pain	Kristoffer Borgli	A24	

=== Highest-grossing films ===
The highest-grossing film Square Peg produced was The Drama, which made $48,102,144 domestically (U.S. and Canada) and $86,568,036 internationally for a total box office gross of $134,670,180. The movie made $6.3 million on its first day and went on to debut to $14.3 million.

Highest-grossing films in North America
Rank	Title	Year	Domestic gross
1	The Drama	2026	$48,062,006
2	Primetime	2026	$45,337,119
3	Hereditary	2018	$44,069,456
4	The Northman	2022	$34,233,110
5	Bugonia	2025	$17,692,390

Highest-grossing films worldwide
Rank	Title	Year	Box office gross
1	The Drama	2026	$134,670,180
2	Hereditary	2018	$90,431,327
3	The Northman	2022	$75,880,603
4	Primetime	2026	$48,816,922
5	Midsommar	2019	$48,582,493
