= Billy Mayo =

American film, stage and television actor

- Born: William Everett Mayo; December 31, 1957; Washington, D.C., U.S.
- Died: June 4, 2019 (aged 61)
- Occupations: Film, stage and television actor

William Everett Mayo (December 31, 1957 – June 4, 2019) was an American film, stage and television actor. He was best known for playing the recurring role of Detective Lyons in the fourth and fifth season of the American soap opera television series Desperate Housewives.

== Life and career ==
Mayo was born in Washington, D.C., the son of William H. and Barbara Mayo. He played college football at Southern University, and served in the United States Marine Corps. He began his stage career in the 1990s, and in 1993, he starred as the title character in the stage play Othello at the Hillside Repertory Theatre in Occidental College. He appeared in such stage plays as Fences and As You Like It. He then began his screen career in 1994, appearing in the CBS crime drama television series Murder, She Wrote. In 1995, he played a police officer in two episodes of the NBC soap opera television series Days of Our Lives.

Later in his career, Mayo guest-starred in numerous television programs including Malcolm in the Middle, Everybody Loves Raymond, Lost, Boston Legal, CSI: Crime Scene Investigation, Dr. Quinn, Medicine Woman, 7th Heaven, Star Trek: Enterprise, Everybody Hates Chris and My Name Is Earl, and played the recurring role of Detective Lyons in the fourth and fifth season of the ABC soap opera television series Desperate Housewives. He also appeared in films such as The Perfect Storm, The Green Hornet, American Violence, Double Bang, Clockstoppers and Breaking the Girls.

Mayo last appeared in an episode of the television series Etheria; the episode was released after his death.

== Death ==
Mayo died on June 4, 2019, at the age of 61.

== Filmography ==
=== Film ===
Year	Title	Role	Notes
1994	Murder at Midnight	Melvin Childs	Direct-to-video film
1996	Vendetta	Sgt. Billy Bilko	
2000	The Perfect Storm	C-130 Pilot	
2001	Double Bang	McKracken	
2001	Maple	Uncle	Short film
2002	Clockstoppers	Q.T. Agent	
2005	Feigning Indifference	Sgt. Rainer	Video
2009	Square	Mr. Jacobs	Short film
2009	The Nation	Muslim Student	
2010	Anger Has a Secret	Mentor	
2011	The Green Hornet	Police Officer	
2011	The Strange Thing About the Johnsons	Sidney	Short film
2011	Manifesto	Jacob	Short film
2011	Beau	Beau	Short film
2011	Hunch	Byron Clemens	Video
2012	For the Lovers Only	Tristan	Short film
2012	Breaking the Girls	Jones	
2012	Jingle All the Way	Frank Bell	Short film
2012	Goodbye L.A.	Boris	Short film
2013	The Coffers	Raymond Farnsworth	Short film
2013	Red Rider	Bruce	Short film
2013	The Oath	Anesthesiologist	Short film
2013	Home	Leo Osman	Short film
2013	The Marking	Gunnery Sgt David Miles	Short film
2014	#ThisCouldBeUs	Old Doug	Short film
2014	Five	Joe Williams	Short film
2015	Broken Nails	Delonte	Short film
2015	A Bitter Lime	Joe	
2016	The Guest House	Detective Mason	
2016	Killing Lazarus	Baxter	
2016	Bedeviled	Cop	
2017	The Evil Within	Monsoon Host	
2017	American Violence	Wilder	
2018	Bones	Doc	Short film
2019	Check It Up: To Whom It May Concern	Lt. Maxwell	Short film
2020	CainAbel	Joseph Billups	Posthumous release
2023	Junction	Salesman	Posthumous release

=== Television ===
Year	Title	Role	Notes
1994	Murder, She Wrote	Sergeant Nutley	1 episode
1995	Lois & Clark: The New Adventures of Superman	Cop	1 episode
1995	Days of Our Lives	Cop	2 episodes
1995	Space: Above and Beyond	Webb	2 episodes
1995–1999	ER	Sheriff / Detective Brannigan	2 episodes
1996	Beverly Hills, 90210	Motorcycle Cop	1 episode
1996	High Incident	Detective	1 episode
1996	Animated Hero Classics	Henry Tubman	Voice role; 1 episode
1996	Dr. Quinn, Medicine Woman	Joe	1 episode
1997	Prison of Secrets	Guard	Television film
1997–1999	7th Heaven	Parent #2 / Guard	2 episodes
1998	Profiler	Dirkson	1 episode
1999	Introducing Dorothy Dandridge	Sergeant	Television film
2000	City of Angels	Dwayne / Frank Adams / Calvin	3 episodes
2001	The District	Father	1 episode
2001	Stranger Inside	Clayton	Television film
2001	The Geena Davis Show	Coach	1 episode
2001	JAG	Embarkation Officer	1 episode
2002	Malcolm in the Middle	Referee	1 episode
2002	The Practice	Sgt. George Gilman	1 episode
2002	CSI: Crime Scene Investigation	Fire Chief James Walker	1 episode
2002	Dharma & Greg	Policeman	1 episode
2002	Judging Amy	Marshal Wilkins	1 episode
2002	24	Agent Rosser	1 episode
2002	The Jersey	Coach Clifford	1 episode
2003	A.U.S.A.	ATF Agent	1 episode
2003	Crossing Jordan	Cop	1 episode
2003	Everybody Loves Raymond	Police Officer	1 episode
2003	Joan of Arcadia	Desk Sgt. Drake	1 episode
2003	The Lyon's Den	Security Guard	1 episode
2003	The West Wing	Secret Service Agent	1 episode
2003	Star Trek: Enterprise	Officer #1	1 episode
2004	The Guardian	Detective Harold Jonas	2 episodes
2004	Nip/Tuck	Cop #2	1 episode
2004	Lost	Kilo	1 episode
2005	Everybody Hates Chris	Mr. Jenkins	1 episode
2005–2007	Boston Legal	Detective Sean Wilkins	2 episodes
2006	Monk	Mechanic	1 episode
2006	Sons & Daughters	Cop	1 episode
2007	Grey's Anatomy	Rick	2 episodes
2007	Smith	Carl	1 episode
2007	Without a Trace	Mario Stubbs	1 episode
2007	Traveler	The Porter	5 episodes
2007–2009	Desperate Housewives	Detective Lyons	5 episodes
2008	Back to You	Policeman	1 episode
2008	Californication	Cop #1	1 episode
2008	My Name Is Earl	Motel Father	1 episode
2009	Southland	Officer #2	1 episode
2009	Mental	Quentin Morris	1 episode
2009	Operating Instructions	General Reynolds	Television film
2010	Crowne Royale Street King	Dr. Parker	1 episode
2011	Shameless	Dispatch	1 episode
2011	Castle	Senior Officer	2 episodes
2011	Cursed	Rusty Leonard	1 episode
2011	Mr. Sunshine	Russel	1 episode
2012	The Closer	Lt. Bobby Towne	1 episode
2012	Rizzoli & Isles	Sam Jackson	1 episode
2013	Scandal		1 episode
2013	Body of Proof	Paul Foster	1 episode
2013	Criminal Minds	Captain Marcus Jackson	1 episode
2013–2015	Roomieloverfriends	Sheldon	10 episodes
2014	Yellow	Sheldon	1 episode
2014	The Knight Crew	Alphton Jools	2 episodes
2014	Murder in the First	Bailiff	1 episode
2014	Murder Book	Detective Paul Thomas	Uncredited; 1 episode
2015	Dog with a Blog	General	1 episode
2015	NCIS: Los Angeles	Campus Police Officer #2	1 episode
2015–2016	Sexless	Sheldon	2 episodes
2016	The Fosters	Security Guard	1 episode
2016	Future You	Future Grant	1 episode
2017	Doubt	Judge Kenneth Desmond	2 episodes
2020	Etheria	Bruce	1 episode (Posthumous release)
