= Beau Is Afraid =

2023 film by Ari Aster

- Theatrical release poster
- Directed by: Ari Aster
- Written by: Ari Aster
- Produced by: Lars Knudsen; Ari Aster
- Starring: Joaquin Phoenix; Nathan Lane; Amy Ryan; Stephen McKinley Henderson; Hayley Squires; Denis Ménochet; Kylie Rogers; Parker Posey; Patti LuPone
- Cinematography: Pawel Pogorzelski
- Edited by: Lucian Johnston
- Music by: Bobby Krlic
- Production companies: A24; Square Peg
- Distributed by: A24
- Release dates: April 1, 2023 (Alamo Drafthouse Cinema); April 14, 2023 (United States)
- Running time: 179 minutes
- Country: United States
- Language: English
- Budget: $35 million (net); $50 million (gross)
- Box office: $12.3 million

Beau Is Afraid is a 2023 American surrealist tragicomedy film written, directed, and co-produced by Ari Aster. The film stars Joaquin Phoenix as the title character, and also includes a supporting cast consisting of Patti LuPone, Nathan Lane, Amy Ryan, Kylie Rogers, Parker Posey, Stephen McKinley Henderson, Hayley Squires, Michael Gandolfini, Zoe Lister-Jones, Armen Nahapetian, and Richard Kind. Its plot follows the mild-mannered but paranoia-ridden Beau as he embarks on a surreal odyssey to get home to his mother's house, realizing his greatest fears along the way.

Distributed by A24, Beau Is Afraid premiered at the Alamo Drafthouse Cinema on April 1, 2023, and began a limited theatrical release in the United States on April 14, 2023, before a wide release the following week. The film received generally positive reviews from critics but was a box-office bomb, grossing $12 million against a net production cost of $35 million. Phoenix received a Golden Globe nomination for his performance.

== Plot ==
Beau Wassermann, the son of Mona, a wealthy businesswoman, grows up without a father, who his mother claims died the night Beau was conceived due to a hereditary heart murmur during orgasm. Beau struggles with a recurring dream in which he watches as an identical version of himself demands to know what really happened; in response, his mother locks him in the attic. While on a cruise trip, a teenage Beau falls in love with a girl named Elaine Bray. The two kiss and promise to remain virgins until they meet again.

Now middle-aged, Beau suffers from extreme anxiety and lives alone in a crime-ridden city. He prepares to visit his mother for the anniversary of his father's death, but misses his flight after his suitcase and keys are stolen. Beau calls his mother to explain the situation, but she dismisses him. After having been locked out of his house by deranged homeless people, he attempts to call his mother again, only to have it answered by a UPS driver. The driver has discovered an unidentified body at the residence, leading Beau to believe his mother is dead. After confrontations with a home intruder and a police officer, Beau is hit by a food truck and stabbed to near-death by a serial killer.

Two days later, Beau awakens in the house of a married couple, Grace and Roger, who live with their angsty daughter Toni and an unstable veteran named Jeeves. He calls Mona's attorney, Dr. Cohen, who informs him that despite the Jewish custom to lay the body to rest as soon as possible, her last wish was not to be buried until Beau was present. Roger promises to take Beau to his mother's estate as soon as possible but insists he rest until he is healed. On the day of Beau's release, Toni, who has grown to resent Beau for seemingly replacing her deceased brother, attempts to force him to drink a can of paint, before doing it herself, committing suicide. Grace discovers Beau standing over Toni's body and violently blames him for her death. As Beau flees into the woods, Grace sends Jeeves after him.

Lost in the wilderness, Beau comes upon a group of traveling actors named "The Orphans of the Forest". He is invited to their rehearsal and becomes entranced by the play, imagining himself as the protagonist who searches for his family after being separated by a flood. A man approaches him, claiming he knows his father, who is still alive. Jeeves ambushes the troupe, slaughtering several actors. Beau flees deeper into the woods but is knocked unconscious when Jeeves triggers a taser device within Beau's ankle monitor, placed on him by Roger.

Beau hitchhikes to his mother's estate, only to find that he has just missed her funeral. A woman arrives late for the service; Beau realizes it is Elaine. They reconnect before having sex. Beau, terrified that he is going to die upon climaxing, is relieved when he survives. Elaine, however, dies mid-orgasm. Mona then appears and reveals that she has been alive and spying on him throughout his journey. She guilt-trips Beau for supposedly not loving her enough with audio recordings of his therapy sessions. Upon Beau's demand to know the truth about his father, Mona takes him to the locked attic. Imprisoned inside is his previously-unknown twin brother and his father, who is actually a giant penis-shaped monster. At that moment, Jeeves breaks into the house and is killed by Beau's father. Beau begs his mother for forgiveness, but Mona berates him, declaring her hatred. An enraged Beau briefly attempts to strangle her before she collapses.

In shock, Beau leaves the estate by motorboat. After entering a cave, the boat's motor begins to stall, and he suddenly finds himself in a crowded arena. He is put on trial for perceived slights against his mother, with Mona and Dr. Cohen acting as prosecutors; a cheap lawyer attempts to defend Beau from the absurd accusations, but is ultimately thrown to his death by Mona's employees. His feet glued to the boat, Beau tries to defend himself and appeal to his mother, but she is unresponsive. Realizing the futility of his situation, he decides to accept his fate. The motor explodes, capsizing the boat and drowning Beau. The credits roll as the crowd silently leaves the arena; Mona exits, sobbing uncontrollably.

== Cast ==
- Joaquin Phoenix as Beau Wassermann
  - Armen Nahapetian as young Beau
- Patti LuPone as Mona Wassermann
  - Zoe Lister-Jones as young Mona
- Amy Ryan as Grace
- Nathan Lane as Roger
- Kylie Rogers as Toni
- Denis Ménochet as Jeeves
- Parker Posey as Elaine Bray
  - Julia Antonelli as young Elaine
- Stephen McKinley Henderson as Jeremy Friel, Beau's therapist
- Richard Kind as Dr. Cohen
- Hayley Squires as Penelope
- Julian Richings as Strange Man
- Bill Hader as UPS Guy
- Michael Esper as Officer Johnson
- Michael Gandolfini, Théodore Pellerin and Mike Taylor as Beau's sons
- Manuel Tadros as Cheapo Depot Cashier
- Archie Madekwe as Laughing Man

Alicia Rosario appears as Toni's friend Liz. Patrick Kwok-Choon, Maev Beaty, and Arthur Holden appear as members of the forest theater troupe. David Mamet has a vocal cameo as a rabbi.

== Production ==
=== Development ===
The film had been in development by Ari Aster for some time, with a 2011 short film entitled Beau, that would later serve as the basis for a sequence in the feature film, and a 2014 draft of the script that circulated on the internet. Aster has described the film in many ways, including initially as a "nightmare comedy," "a Jewish Lord of the Rings, but [Beau's] just going to his mom's house," and as "if you pumped a 10-year-old full of Zoloft, and [had] him get your groceries."

=== Influences ===
For an IndieWire Filmmaker Toolkit podcast, Aster and his regular cinematographer Pawel Pogorzelski discussed three key films that influenced their approach for Beau Is Afraid: Jacques Tati's playful, dense comedy Playtime (1967); Alfred Hitchcock's voyeuristic thriller Rear Window (1954); and Albert Brooks' allegorical comedy-fantasy Defending Your Life (1991).

Mark Kermode reviewing Beau Is Afraid for The Guardian said the film had "narrative echoes of Tristram Shandy (both Sterne's novel and Michael Winterbottom's film) and an everything-but-the-kitchen-sink aesthetic reminiscent of the chaotic Cinerama comedy It's a Mad, Mad, Mad, Mad World" (1963). Kermode compared Beau Is Afraid to "Todd Solondz-style urban sickness", the "body horror of David Cronenberg's Shivers" (1975), "Voltaire goes to hell via Darren Aronofsky's Mother!" (2017), the "exuberantly manic energy of Paul Thomas Anderson's Punch-Drunk Love" (2002), the "nightmare logic of David Lynch's Eraserhead (1977), "Charlie Kaufman's painfully contrived Synecdoche, New York" (2008), and "slipping on a Buñuelian banana skin". Another critic wrote: "The film also tries building to a profound conclusion, but it plays out like a much less interesting version of Pink Floyd - The Wall."

Sight and Sound also found Charlie Kaufman influences, and said various moments in Beau Is Afraid recalled Franz Kafka, Mark Twain, and the Book of Job.

=== Filming ===
In February 2021, A24 announced the film, then titled Disappointment Blvd., (Note: Aster later said in a 2023 Reddit AMA that the title was a cover-up, meant to be a distraction from the early draft of script of the film that circulated online.) with Joaquin Phoenix on board to star in the leading role. The film's ensemble cast was announced in June and July.

Co-star Stephen McKinley Henderson described Aster and Phoenix as "so simpatico ... their way of working together was like they were really old friends. They could get upset and make up in the span of seconds, it seemed. But the work was always the better for it." During a Q&A session on April 1, 2023 with actress Emma Stone, Aster recounted an incident in which, during the shooting of a "very intense" scene involving Phoenix's co-star Patti LuPone, Phoenix suddenly collapsed and lost consciousness as a result of the physical intensity of his stunts, which included breaking through glass. Initially annoyed because "it was a really good take", Aster realized it was serious as "[Phoenix] was letting people touch him and people were tending to him and he was allowing it".

Principal photography began on June 28, 2021, and concluded that October. The film was shot in Downtown Montreal, and Saint-Bruno-de-Montarville, an off-island suburb of Montreal in Quebec, with cinematographer Pogorzelski and production designer Fiona Crombie. Animation for the film was done by Cristobal León & Joaquín Cociña, who were personally chosen by Aster for their work on the 2018 stop-motion film The Wolf House. With a net budget of $35 million, Beau Is Afraid was A24's most expensive film until it was surpassed by Civil War.

=== Music ===
The film's score was produced by Katherine Miller and composed by British electronic musician Bobby Krlic, who performs under the name the Haxan Cloak. With the score, Krlic stated that "every step of the way [in the film, in relation to the score], you're with Joaquin, you're with Beau", adding that the score is meant to be a representation of Beau's mental state throughout the events of the film.

The score was released on April 14, 2023, a week before the film's wide theatrical release, through A24's music division, and is separated into five parts, corresponding with the five acts of the film in which the songs appear.

== Release ==
=== Theatrical ===
Beau Is Afraid officially premiered in Los Angeles on April 10, 2023, at the Directors Guild of America, with Aster and the cast in attendance. The film initially had a sneak premiere with a Q&A moderated by Emma Stone at the Alamo Drafthouse Cinema in Brooklyn, New York, as part of an April Fools' Day event with livestream screenings provided at Alamo theaters in select cities, as the audience attending was originally scheduled to watch the director's cut of Aster's Midsommar (2019). Further exclusive Q&A screenings were conducted, with moderators such as Martin Scorsese, Nathan Fielder and Rachel Sennott. The film was released theatrically in the United States by A24 on April 21, 2023, following a delay from its original 2022 schedule.

The film was shown a week early in select IMAX theaters in Los Angeles and New York on April 14, before being released in select North American IMAX theaters on April 21.

=== Home media ===
The film was released digitally on June 13, 2023. A Blu-ray and DVD release followed on July 11, 2023.

== Reception ==
=== Box office ===
In its opening weekend the film grossed $320,396 (an average of $80,099) from four theaters, finishing 14th at the box office. Expanding to 965 theaters in its second weekend, the film made $2.7 million, finishing ninth. In its third weekend the film made $1.4 million from 2,125 theaters, finishing 13th. In October 2023, TheWrap reported that the film took a $35 million loss.

=== Critical response ===
On the review aggregator website Rotten Tomatoes, 67% of 272 critics' reviews are positive, with an average rating of 6.8/10. The website's consensus reads: "Beau Is Afraid is overstuffed to the point of erasing the line between self-flagellation and self-indulgence, but Ari Aster's bravura and Joaquin Phoenix's sheer commitment give this neurotic odyssey undeniable power." Metacritic, which uses a weighted average, assigned the film a score of 63 out of 100, based on 51 critics, indicating "generally favorable" reviews.

Writing for RogerEbert.com, Nick Allen gave the film three and a half out of four stars, calling it "gobsmacking, sometimes exhausting, always beguiling," and wrote that it was Aster's "funniest movie yet." He praised Phoenix's performance as "fascinating," and concluded that "the ambition is the point." Mark Kermode's review for The Guardian found the film was "sprawlingly picaresque" and "a rambling, labyrinthine, navel-gazing romp." He gave it three out of five stars. However, Peter Bradshaw's Guardian review found the film was an "epically pointless odyssey of hipster non-horror" and a "colossal recovered memory of mock Oedipal agony which is scary, boring and sad." He gave the film two out of five stars.

Manohla Dargis of the New York Times wrote that the film was "a supersized, fitfully amusing, self-important tale of fear and loathing," and chastised the run-time by saying, "It's a journey; midway, it becomes a slog." Anthony Lane of The New Yorker also found the film's "nervous wreckage" and excesses were "wearisome", noting that the "movie is laid out in ontological order, as it were, from being to nonbeing. If there is a plot, it's more like a plot of earth than a narrative; back and forth Aster goes through the years." But Lane found the middle animated sequence had an "oddly antiquated beauty" that owed a nod to The Wizard of Oz (1939). David Sims of The Atlantic also praised the film's "impressionistic animated visuals".

Filmmaker John Waters selected Beau Is Afraid as the best movie of 2023. Writing for Vulture he said, "A superlong, super-crazy, super-funny movie about one man's mental breakdown with a cast better than Around the World in 80 Days: Joaquin Phoenix, Patti LuPone, Parker Posey, Nathan Lane, and Amy Ryan. It's a laugh riot from hell you'll never forget, even if you want to." Martin Scorsese was similarly enthusiastic about the film, citing Aster as "one of the most extraordinary new voices in world cinema" and praising Aster for subverting the traditional three-act structure. Other filmmakers have voiced their appreciation for the film, including Robert Eggers, Ciro Guerra, Bill Hader, Don Hertzfeldt, Zoe Lister-Jones, James Ponsoldt, Jeff Rowe and Adam Wingard. The film ranked number 26 on Sight and Sound's annual poll for the "best 50 films of the year," in a five-way tie with The Beast, The Fabelmans, The Delinquents and Rotting in the Sun. In June 2025, IndieWire ranked the film at number 82 on its list of "The 100 Best Movies of the 2020s (So Far)."

=== Accolades ===
Award	Date of ceremony	Category	Nominee(s)	Result	Ref.
Golden Trailer Awards	June 29, 2023	Most Original Trailer	"Beyond" (AV Squad)	Nominated	
Golden Trailer Awards	June 29, 2023	Best Drama Poster	"Payoff" (AV Print)	Nominated	
Hollywood Critics Association Midseason Film Awards	June 30, 2023	Best Actor	Joaquin Phoenix	Nominated	
Hollywood Critics Association Midseason Film Awards	June 30, 2023	Best Supporting Actress	Patti LuPone	Nominated	
Indiana Film Journalists Association	December 17, 2023	Best Film	Beau Is Afraid	Longlisted	
Indiana Film Journalists Association	December 17, 2023	Best Lead Performance	Joaquin Phoenix	Nominated	
Indiana Film Journalists Association	December 17, 2023	Best Adapted Screenplay	Ari Aster	Nominated	
Indiana Film Journalists Association	December 17, 2023	Best Cinematography	Pawel Pogorzelski	Nominated	
Indiana Film Journalists Association	December 17, 2023	Best Ensemble Acting	Beau Is Afraid	Nominated	
Indiana Film Journalists Association	December 17, 2023	Original Vision	Beau Is Afraid	Nominated	
Golden Globe Awards	January 7, 2024	Best Actor in a Motion Picture – Musical or Comedy	Joaquin Phoenix	Nominated	
Satellite Awards	February 18, 2024	Best Actor in a Motion Picture – Comedy or Musical	Joaquin Phoenix	Nominated	
ADG Excellence in Production Design Awards	February 10, 2024	Excellence in Production Design for a Contemporary Film	Fiona Crombie	Nominated	
Critics' Choice Super Awards	April 4, 2024	Best Actor in a Horror Movie	Joaquin Phoenix	Nominated	
