= Ari Aster =

American filmmaker (born 1986)

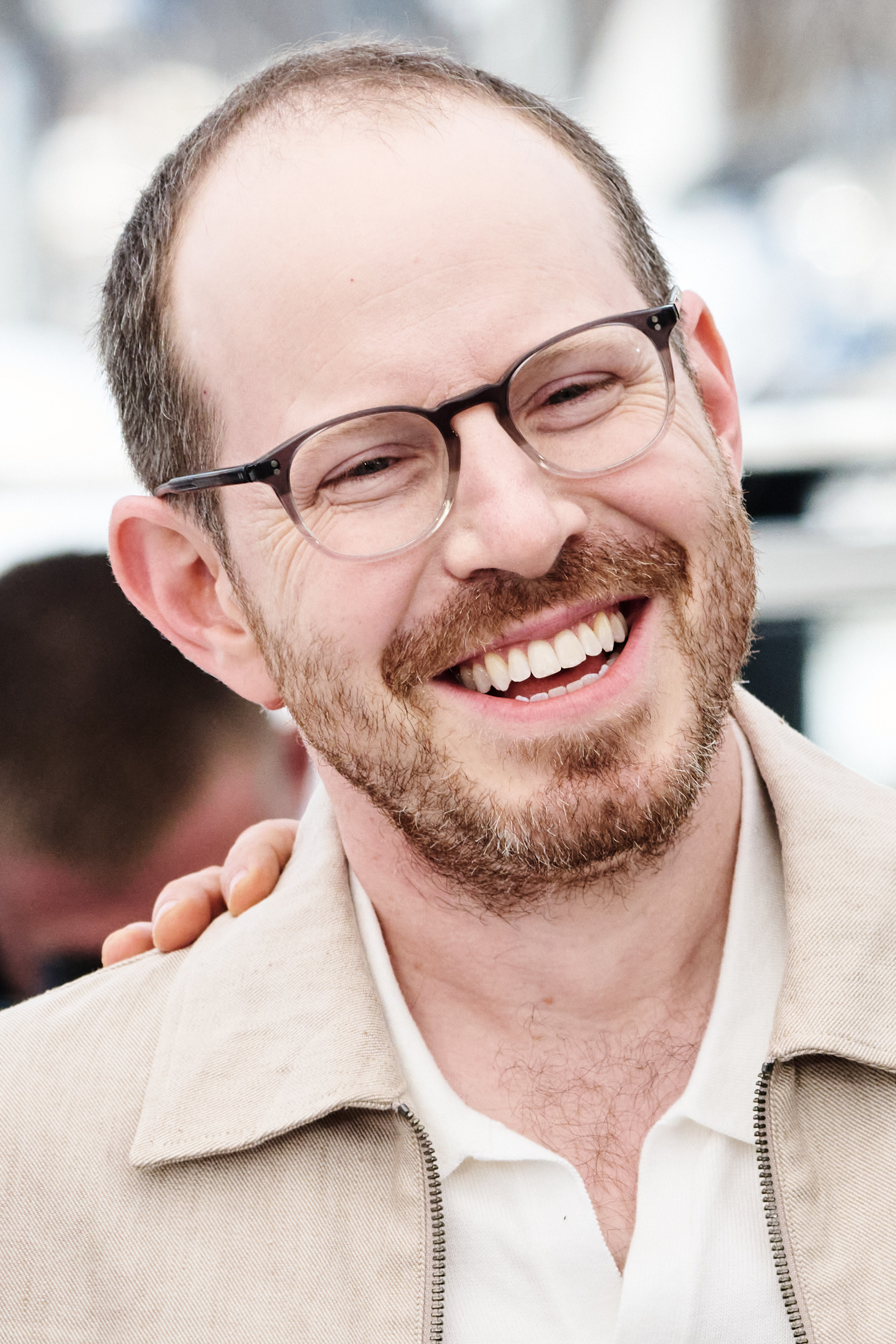
- Aster in 2025
- Born: July 15, 1986 (age 40); Princeton, New Jersey, U.S.
- Occupation: Filmmaker
- Years active: 2008–present

Ari Aster (born July 15, 1986) is an American filmmaker. His films are noted for their unsettling combination of dark humor, horror, and graphic violence. After garnering some recognition for writing and directing the short horror film The Strange Thing About the Johnsons (2011) as part of his studies at the AFI Conservatory, he became widely known for writing and directing the horror films Hereditary (2018) and Midsommar (2019), establishing himself in the genre of elevated horror.

Aster co-founded the production company Square Peg with Danish producer Lars Knudsen in 2019. He pivoted away from horror by writing, directing, and producing the surrealist comedy-drama film Beau Is Afraid (2023) and the satirical neo-Western thriller film Eddington (2025), both of which starred Joaquin Phoenix and which received generally positive critical reception but performed poorly at the box office.

== Early life ==
Ari Aster was born to Jewish parents in Princeton, New Jersey on July 15, 1986. The family moved to New York City when Ari was about a week old. His mother was a poet and his father was a jazz musician. He has a younger brother. He saw Dick Tracy (1990) when he was four years old, later recalling that he jumped from his seat and ran "six New York City blocks" while his mother chased him after seeing the scene in which Warren Beatty's titular protagonist fired a machine gun in front of a wall of fire. He spent some of his childhood in England, where his father opened a jazz nightclub in Chester. The family returned to the U.S. when he was 10 years old and settled in Santa Fe, New Mexico, where he spent the rest of his childhood. He described himself as a "fat kid with a stutter" who felt alienated and was kicked out of Santa Fe Preparatory School. He was obsessed with films, Leonard Maltin's Movie Guide, and Hastings Video Store.

Originally aspiring to become an author, Aster became interested in filmmaking through screenwriting, and wrote six feature-length screenplays during high school even though he would not begin actually making films until college. As a child, he became obsessed with horror films and frequently rented them from local video stores: "I just exhausted the horror section of every video store I could find. I didn't know how to assemble people who would cooperate on something like that [so] I found myself just writing screenplays." In 2004, he began studying film at the College of Santa Fe, where he made several short films and wrote for the local Weekly Alibi arts magazine. He graduated in 2008 and debuted as the writer and director of the short film Tale of Two Tims, which he submitted to the American Film Institute (AFI). This led to him being accepted into the 2010 class of the AFI Conservatory's graduate program, where he earned an MFA with a focus in directing.

== Career ==
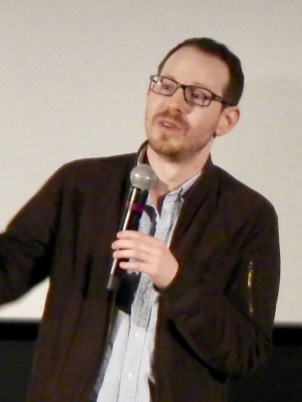
Aster in 2018

After graduating from the AFI Conservatory, Aster wrote and directed several more short films between 2011 and 2018, often teaming with his AFI Conservatory friends Alejandro de Leon and Pawel Pogorzelski. The most notable project was the short psychological horror film The Strange Thing About the Johnsons (2011), which follows the members of a suburban family in which the father finds himself trapped in an incestuous relationship with his abusive son. The film was Aster's thesis film while studying at the AFI Conservatory, and was later screened at film festivals; it premiered at the Slamdance Film Festival in Utah on January 22 before leaking online in November, where it went viral. Film website Short of the Week wrote that the comments on the film's YouTube page had "everything from effusive acclaim to disgusted vitriol [...] in terms of the internet, that means it's a hit". Aster worked on the film with fellow AFI students. He first conceived the story while discussing taboos with his friends, including the film's star Brandon Greenhouse, before starting his first year at AFI.

Aster made his feature-length directorial debut when he wrote and directed the supernatural horror film Hereditary (2018), which follows a family haunted by a mysterious presence after the death of their secretive grandmother. The film premiered in the Midnight section at that year's Sundance Film Festival, and was theatrically released in the United States on June 8. It was acclaimed by critics, with Toni Collette's performance receiving particular praise, and was a commercial success; it grossed over $90 million on a $10 million budget, becoming A24's highest-grossing film worldwide at the time of its release. Peter Travers of Rolling Stone named it the scariest film of 2018.

Aster next wrote and directed the folk horror film Midsommar (2019), which was also produced by A24. It follows a group of American university students who travel to Sweden for a festival that occurs once every 90 years and find themselves in the clutches of a cult claiming to practise paganism. Midsommar was theatrically released in the United States on July 3. The film received positive reviews from critics, with many praising Aster's direction and Florence Pugh's performance. Aster's original 171-minute cut of the film, which A24 asked him to trim down for a wide theatrical release, had its world premiere at the Film Society of Lincoln Center in New York City as part of its Scary Movies XII lineup on August 20. For his work on the film, Aster received a nomination for Best Screenplay at the 29th Gotham Independent Film Awards.

In June 2019, Aster and Danish producer Lars Knudsen announced that they had launched a new production company called Square Peg. In June 2020, Aster said his next film would be a "nightmare comedy" that lasts for four hours. In February 2021, A24 announced that Aster would write and direct Beau Is Afraid (2023) as its third partnership with him. The film follows an anxiety-fueled and paranoid middle-aged man who must venture out on a surreal odyssey to visit his mother's home. It was originally titled Disappointment Blvd. It was released in theaters on April 21. The film received mixed reviews, with some critics and viewers praising Aster's direction and Joaquin Phoenix's performance while deriding its length and story, but the film was not a commercial success as it earned around $10 million at the box office against a budget of $35 million. It ultimately lost the studio over $35 million. Speaking about the film's critical and commercial shortcomings, Aster said in 2025: "I was pretty sad that it was so maligned […] it was a bummer. It lost money. Critically, I wouldn’t say it was reviled, there’s just no consensus whatsoever... There are things that I would do differently if I did it now... I think I ejected a number of people from the theater with that [last hour]."

In 2021, Aster signed a first-look TV deal with A24. In August 2022, it was announced that Aster would reteam with A24 to produce Kristoffer Borgli's third feature film Dream Scenario, with Nicolas Cage attached to star. The film would be produced by Square Peg, which also expanded its slate to include films by Kantemir Balagov, Guy Maddin, Don Hertzfeldt, and Sebastián Silva, as well as television adaptations of J. G. Ballard's The Drowned World, Nick Drnaso's Acting Class, and Junji Ito's Uzumaki.

Aster wrote and directed the neo-Western political satire film Eddington (2025), which was co-produced by A24 and Square Peg. Set in 2020 during the COVID-19 pandemic and George Floyd protests, the film examines the political and social turmoil in the fictional town of Eddington, New Mexico caused by the contested mayoral election fought between the county sheriff and the town's mayor. The film debuted on May 16, 2025, in competition at the Cannes Film Festival. It was released in theaters on July 18. It received mixed reviews from critics, who praised its ambition but found its satirical elements lacking.

His next film, Scapegoat, is slated to begin production in November 2026. Scarlett Johansson, Jacob Elordi, Jude Law, Caleb Landry Jones, Ella Purnell, Samba Schutte, and Cory Michael Smith are attached to star.

== Upcoming and unfinished projects ==
- Untitled "portrait short" scripts (2018)
- Untitled "Sirkian melodrama" (2019)
- Untitled big-budget sci-fi satire adaptation (2019)
- Untitled musical film (2019)
- Untitled gangster saga epic (2019)
- Don't Wake Daddy adaptation (2023)
- Eddington sequel (2025)
- Untitled horror film (2025)
- Scapegoat (2026)
- Hereditary prequel (2026)

Aster and Hertzfeldt are collaborating on an animated feature film called Antarctica, described by Hertzfeldt as "big" and "very expensive".

== Filmmaking style ==
While as violently bloody as many of his peers, Aster tends to focus on the horror of the unraveling of self. His films often explore unresolved grief, familial trauma, the loss of personal identity, and deep psychological deterioration. In Aster's films, vividly bright imagery and symbols of childhood are frequently juxtaposed with visceral, bloody violence. Beau Is Afraid, for example, featured numerous child-like animation sequences, Midsommar was set in the idyllic Swedish mountains, and Hereditary was filmed as if it was inside a dollhouse.

== Filmography ==
=== Feature film ===
Year	Title	Director	Writer	Producer	Ref.
2018	Hereditary	Yes	Yes	No	
2019	Midsommar	Yes	Yes	No	
2023	Beau Is Afraid	Yes	Yes	Yes	
2025	Eddington	Yes	Yes	Yes	

Executive producer

Year	Title	Director	Ref.
2021	Los Huesos	Cristobal León; Joaquín Cociña	
2023	El Padre Bueno	Jorge Canada Escorihuela	
2024	Sasquatch Sunset	Nathan Zellner; David Zellner	
2024	Rumours	Guy Maddin; Evan Johnson; Galen Johnson	
2025	Death of a Unicorn	Alex Scharfman	
TBA	Untitled Arkasha Stevenson film	Arkasha Stevenson	

Producer

Year	Title	Director	Ref.
2023	Dream Scenario	Kristoffer Borgli	
2025	Bugonia	Yorgos Lanthimos	
2026	The Drama	Kristoffer Borgli	
2026	Primetime	Lance Oppenheim	
TBA	Enemies	Henry Dunham	

=== Short film ===
Year	Title	Director	Writer	Editor	Actor	Ref.
2008	Herman's Cure-All Tonic	Yes	No	No	No	
2011	The Strange Thing About the Johnsons	Yes	Yes	No	Yes	
2011	TDF Really Works	Yes	Yes	Yes	Yes	
2011	Beau	Yes	Yes	Yes	Yes	
2013	Munchausen	Yes	Yes	No	No	
2013	C'est la vie	Yes	Yes	Yes	Yes	
2014	Basically	Yes	Yes	No	No	
2014	The Turtle's Head	Yes	Yes	Yes	No	

== Reception ==
Year	Film	Rotten Tomatoes	Metacritic	Budget	Box office
2018	Hereditary	90% (384 ratings)	87 (49 reviews)	$10 million	$90 million
2019	Midsommar	83% (411 ratings)	72 (54 reviews)	$9 million	$48 million
2023	Beau Is Afraid	68% (271 ratings)	63 (51 reviews)	$35 million	$12 million
2025	Eddington	68% (221 ratings)	64 (44 reviews)	$25 million	$13 million

== Awards and nominations ==
Award	Date of ceremony	Category	Work	Result	Ref.
Chicago Film Critics Association Awards	December 8, 2018	Most Promising Filmmaker	Hereditary	Won	
Boston Society of Film Critics	December 16, 2018	Best New Filmmaker	Hereditary	Runner-up	
Gotham Awards	November 26, 2018	Breakthrough Director	Hereditary	Nominated	
Independent Spirit Awards	February 23, 2019	Best First Feature	Hereditary	Nominated	
Fangoria Chainsaw Awards	February 25, 2019	Best Director	Hereditary	Won	
Fangoria Chainsaw Awards	February 25, 2019	Best Screenplay	Hereditary	Won	
Gotham Awards	December 2, 2019	Best Screenplay	Midsommar	Nominated	
Indiana Film Journalists Association	December 17, 2023	Best Adapted Screenplay	Beau is Afraid	Nominated	
Cannes Film Festival	24 May 2025	Palme d'Or	Eddington	Nominated	

== Bibliography ==
- Gmelch, Adrian (2023). Art-Horror: The Films of Ari Aster and Robert Eggers. Create Space. ISBN 9798364720719.
