= AFI Conservatory =

Private film school in Los Angeles, California

- Type: Private non-profit school
- Established: 1969
- Affiliations: American Film Institute
- Dean: Susan Ruskin
- Location: Hollywood Hills, Los Angeles, California, U.S.
- Campus: Urban, 8 acres (3.2 ha)
- Website: afi.edu

The AFI Conservatory is a private non-profit graduate film school in the Hollywood Hills district of Los Angeles. Students (called "Fellows") learn from the masters in a collaborative, hands-on production environment with an emphasis on storytelling. The Conservatory is a program of the American Film Institute founded in 1969.

== History ==
The Center for Advanced Film Studies (later the AFI Conservatory) opened its doors at Greystone Mansion on September 23, 1969. Harold Lloyd screened his film The Freshman and spoke with AFI Fellows on the school's first day. The first class included Terrence Malick, Caleb Deschanel, and Paul Schrader.

In 1973, filmmaker John Cassavetes was the first filmmaker-in-residence while editing A Woman Under the Influence. In 1975, filmmaker Ján Kadár, director of the Oscar-winning film The Shop on Main Street, became the Conservatory's second filmmaker-in-residence.

In 2013, Emmy and Oscar-winning director, producer and screenwriter James L. Brooks (As Good as It Gets, Broadcast News, Terms of Endearment) joined the AFI Conservatory as artistic director, where he provides leadership for the film program. Brooks' artistic role at the AFI Conservatory has a rich legacy that includes Daniel Petrie, Jr., Robert Wise and Frank Pierson. Former deans of the AFI Conservatory include Robert Mandel, Jan Schuette and Richard Gladstein. Susan Ruskin is the current dean of the AFI Conservatory and executive vice president of AFI.

Among those AFI has bestowed honorary degrees upon during its annual commencement ceremony are Maya Angelou, John Williams, Ken Burns, Sherry Lansing, Sydney Pollack, Clint Eastwood, Jeffrey Katzenberg, Kathleen Kennedy, Spike Lee, Rita Moreno, and Quentin Tarantino.

AFI Conservatory thesis films have been nominated for 10 Academy Awards and earned 2 wins.

== Academics ==
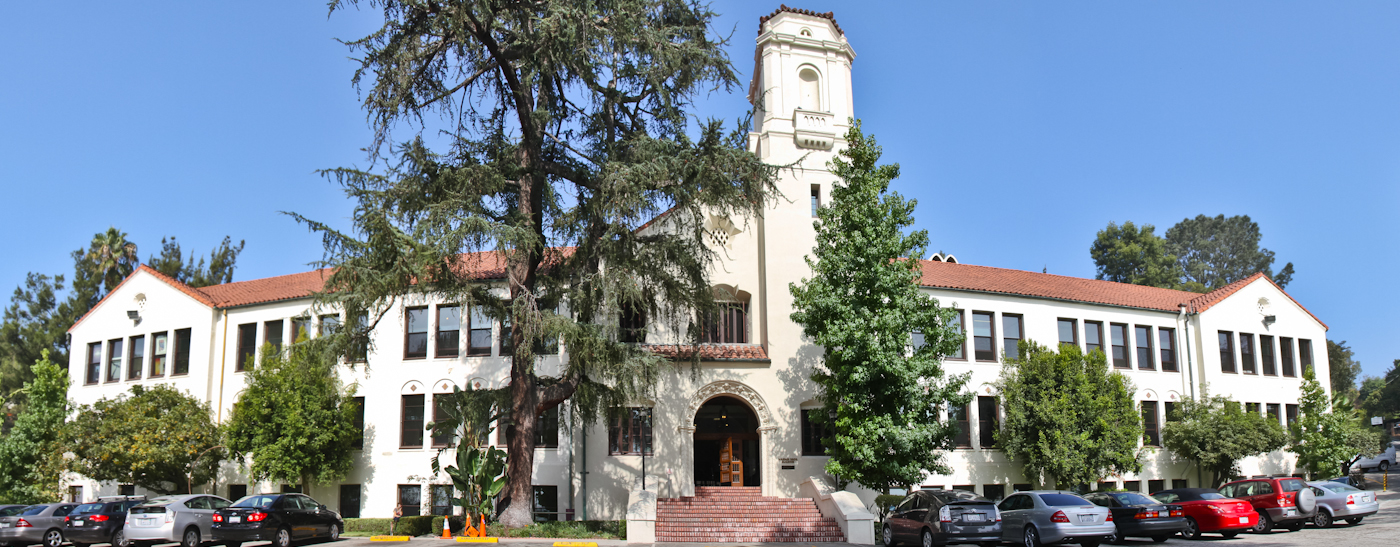
The Warner Bros. building on the AFI campus.

=== Rankings ===
In 2023, The Hollywood Reporter ranked AFI as the #1 film school in the United States.

=== Conservatory Program ===
AFI Conservatory is a five-term Master of Fine Arts program in six disciplines:

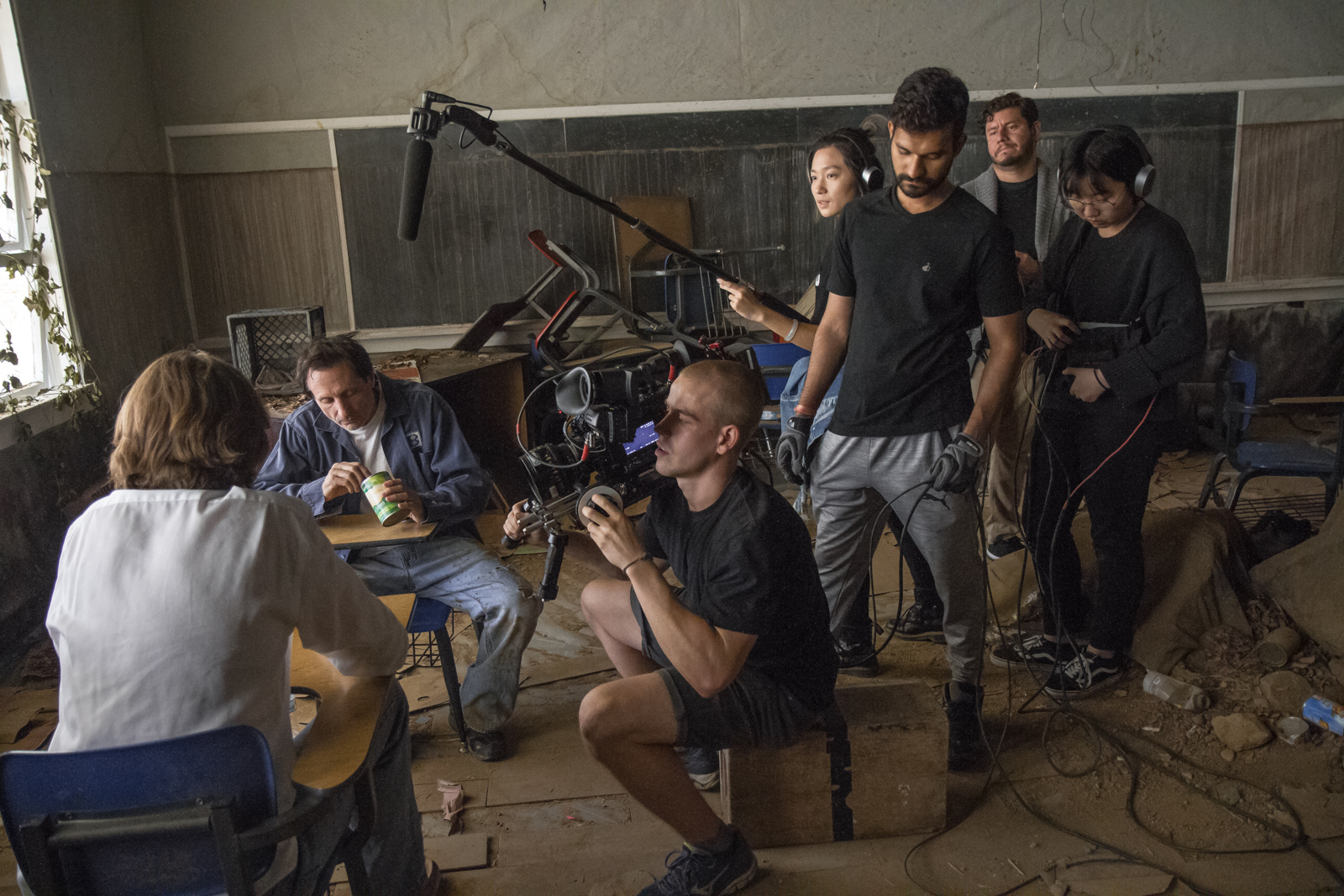
AFI Conservatory Fellows filming on the AFI campus

Cinematography - Encompasses training from pre-visualization to advanced image manipulation and control, Cinematography Fellows develop their storytelling skills using formats ranging from digital video to 16mm and 35mm film cameras.

Directing - This area of narrative filmmaking covers areas like directing styles, techniques, and strategies. It includes an overview of the production process and the methods used to translate a written screenplay into a film.

Editing - Editing Fellows master the skills needed to be editors, assistant editors and post-production producers while learning the technical, aesthetic and collaborative aspects of post-production with a primary focus on storytelling.

Producing - Producing Fellows study all aspects of creative, entrepreneurial production while developing and producing a minimum of three short films in their first year and a thesis film in their second year.

Production Design - Attracting artists from architecture, interior design, theater design and other related fields, the Production Design curriculum focuses on the creative process of visually and physically developing cinematic environments.

Screenwriting - Screenwriting Fellows conceive and write multiple projects in features, short films, long and short-form TV drama and comedy as well as webisodes and other Internet innovations. Fellows learn to collaborate with Directing and Producing classmates.

=== Faculty ===
The AFI Conservatory has a faculty of working professionals including Todd Cherniawsky (art director, Star Wars: The Last Jedi), Stan Chervin (writer, Moneyball), Destin Daniel Cretton, (director, Short Term 12), Matthew Friedman (editor, The Farewell), Joe Garrity (production designer, Best in Show), Susan Littenberg (editor Easy A), Stephen Lighthill (recipient 2018 ASC President's Award), Elvis Mitchell (film critic), Michele Mulroney (writer, Sherlock Holmes: A Game of Shadows), Martin Nicholson (editor, The Alienist), Lauren Polizzi (art director, The Hunger Games: Mockingjay – Part 1 & The Hunger Games: Mockingjay – Part 2), Louis Provost (VP Production, Walt Disney Studios), Patricia Riggen (director The 33), Russell Schwartz (marketing executive on films including Chappaquiddick), Anna Thomas (co-writer El Norte), Jennie Tugend, (producer, Free Willy), Janet Yang (producer, The Joy Luck Club).

=== Seminars ===
The Harold Lloyd Master Seminar series, named after the silent film star who gave the first seminar, takes place on campus and runs throughout the academic year. It brings AFI Conservatory Fellows together with artists to share their work and experiences in an informal setting.

== Alumni ==
The program has graduated more than 5,000 Fellows. AFI Conservatory alumni include:

- Andrea Arnold, (American Honey, Fish Tank, Big Little Lies),
- Darren Aronofsky (Requiem for a Dream, Black Swan, mother!),
- Ari Aster (Hereditary, Midsommar),
- John Cassavetes (A Woman Under the Influence) ,
- Julie Dash (Daughters of the Dust),
- Todd Field (In the Bedroom, Little Children, Tár),
- Jack Fisk (Badlands, Days of Heaven, There Will Be Blood),
- Scott Frank, (Out of Sight, Logan),
- Carl Franklin (One False Move, Devil in a Blue Dress, House of Cards),
- Amy Heckerling (Clueless, Fast Times at Ridgemont High),
- Patty Jenkins (Monster, Wonder Woman),
- Janusz Kamiński (Lincoln, Schindler's List, Saving Private Ryan),
- Matthew Libatique (Noah, Black Swan),
- David Lynch (Mulholland Drive, Blue Velvet),
- Terrence Malick (Days of Heaven, The Thin Red Line, The Tree of Life),
- Rachel Morrison (Mudbound, Black Panther),
- Victor Nuñez (Ruby in Paradise, Ulee's Gold),
- Wally Pfister (Memento, The Dark Knight, Inception),
- Robert Richardson (Platoon, JFK, Django Unchained),
- Paul Schrader (Taxi Driver, Raging Bull).
