= List of black-and-white films produced since 1966 =

American film and television studios terminated production of black-and-white output in 1966 and, during the following two years, the rest of the world followed suit. At the start of the 1960s, transition to color proceeded slowly, with major studios continuing to release black-and-white films through 1965 and into 1966. Among the five Best Picture nominees at the 33rd Academy Awards in April 1961, two — Sons and Lovers and the winner, The Apartment — were black-and white. Two of the nominees in 1962, The Hustler and Judgment at Nuremberg, were likewise black-and white. The pattern continued into 1963, with The Longest Day and To Kill a Mockingbird; 1964, with America America and Lilies of the Field; and into 1965, with Dr. Strangelove and Zorba the Greek.

At the 38th Academy Awards, held on April 18, 1966, the Best Picture winner (The Sound of Music) and one other nominee (Doctor Zhivago) were in color, but the remaining three nominees (Darling, Ship of Fools and A Thousand Clowns) were in black-and-white. However, at the 39th Academy Awards, held on April 10, 1967, the winner (A Man for All Seasons) and three other nominees (Alfie, The Russians Are Coming the Russians Are Coming and The Sand Pebbles) were in color. Only one nominee (Who's Afraid of Virginia Woolf?) was in black-and-white.

By the 40th Academy Awards, held on April 10, 1968, not only were the winner (In the Heat of the Night) and all four of the other nominees (Bonnie and Clyde, Doctor Dolittle, The Graduate and Guess Who's Coming to Dinner) in color but, because studios had almost entirely stopped making black-and-white films, the awards for Best Cinematography, Best Art Direction and Best Costume Design were merged into single categories rather than having a distinction between color and monochrome.

== Transition ==
The transition to color started in earnest when NBC announced in May 1963 that a large majority of its 1964–65 TV season would be in color. By late September 1964, the move to potential all-color programming was being seen as successful and, on March 8, 1965, NBC confirmed that its 1965–66 season would be almost entirely in color. Three months later, on June 17, CBS, which had been limiting its color programming to only occasional specials, sent out a bulletin that it was preparing to broadcast at least 50 percent of its 1965–66 primetime programming in color.

The move of American TV to color reached its final phase in February 1966 when the third network, ABC, announced plans for its 1966–67 season to be almost entirely in color. Since the premiere of NBC Saturday Night at the Movies in September 1961, post-1948 major studio feature films gained a dominant foothold in primetime American TV and, by the mid-1960s, feature films were being broadcast by all three networks in prime time on a nearly-daily basis. Although many of those films were in black-and-white, the ones that were presented in color on NBC had been singled out for special promotion as "broadcast in living color".

In the aftermath of ABC's announcement, studios quickly surmised that only the color features in their film library would have TV broadcast value and stopped production of black-and-white films. Other than a very small number of major films that the studios were willing to publicize — The Fortune Cookie, Is Paris Burning?, Who's Afraid of Virginia Woolf? — completed or nearly completed black-and-white features were put into perfunctory release, but features that had been only partially completed were halted and ordered to restart in color. A similar situation had occurred 37 years earlier, in 1929, when studios stopped production on mid-completion silent films and ordered the addition of dialogue.

Since the 1970s, fiction feature films around the world have been filmed almost exclusively in color. Some films after the transition to color are occasionally presented in black-and-white for budgetary or stylistic reasons. This is a list of notable feature films made after the 1960s that have a significant amount of their running time in black-and-white or monochrome/sepia tone. Many modern black-and-white films are shot in color and converted in post-production.

== Black-and-white films ==
Note: This list does not include short films, documentaries, or films with less than 50% black-and-white footage.

=== 1966–1969 ===
Film	Year	Exclusively B/W
Alice in Wonderland	1966	Yes
Andrei Rublev	1966	No
Au hasard Balthazar	1966	Yes
The Battle of Algiers	1966	Yes
Blood Bath	1966	Yes
Chelsea Girls	1966	No
Chimes at Midnight	1966	Yes
The Christmas Tree	1966	Yes
Cul-de-sac	1966	Yes
Daisies	1966	No
Don't Let It Get You	1966	Yes
Don't Worry, We'll Think of a Title	1966	Yes
Eye of the Devil	1966	Yes
The Fortune Cookie	1966	Yes
Georgy Girl	1966	Yes
I Was Happy Here	1966	Yes
The Idol	1966	Yes
Is Paris Burning?	1966	Yes
Kid Rodelo	1966	Yes
Lord Love a Duck	1966	Yes
Mademoiselle	1966	Yes
A Man and a Woman	1966	No
A Man Called Adam	1966	Yes
Mister Buddwing	1966	Yes
Morgan – A Suitable Case for Treatment	1966	Yes
Naked Evil	1966	Yes
Red Zone Cuba	1966	Yes
Seconds	1966	Yes
The Three Sisters	1966	Yes
The Undertaker and His Pals	1966	No
Who Killed the Cat?	1966	Yes
Who's Afraid of Virginia Woolf?	1966	Yes
The Girl with the Hungry Eyes	1967	Yes
In Cold Blood	1967	Yes
The Incident	1967	Yes
Who's That Knocking at My Door	1967	Yes
Cuckoo Patrol	1967	Yes
Mouchette	1967	Yes
The Sailor from Gibraltar	1967	Yes
Ulysses	1967	No
Bedazzled	1967	No
The Vulture	1967	Yes
Warrendale	1967	Yes
The Whisperers	1967	Yes
The White Bus	1967	No
Beyond the Law	1968	Yes
Confessions of a Psycho Cat	1968	Yes
Faces	1968	Yes
If....	1968	No
Night of the Living Dead	1968	Yes
Wild 90	1968	Yes
The Birthday Party	1968	No
Moss on the Stones	1968	No
The Committee	1968	Yes
Inadmissible Evidence	1968	Yes
Tell Me Lies	1968	Yes
Bronco Bullfrog	1969	Yes
Everything for Sale	1969	No
Love Is Colder Than Death	1969	Yes
Mondo Trasho	1969	Yes
Out of It	1969	Yes
Putney Swope	1969	No
The Cremator	1969	Yes
The Graduation	1969	Yes
The Wedding Party	1969	Yes

=== 1970s ===
Film	Year	Exclusively B/W
Awakening of the Beast	1970	No
Even Dwarfs Started Small	1970	Yes
Evil Spirits of Japan	1970	Yes
Gods of the Plague	1970	Yes
Heroic Purgatory	1970	Yes
How I Unleashed World War II	1970	Yes
King Lear	1970	Yes
Live Today, Die Tomorrow!	1970	Yes
Multiple Maniacs	1970	Yes
Quiet Days in Clichy	1970	Yes
Reconstruction	1970	Yes
The American Soldier	1970	Yes
The Honeymoon Killers	1970	Yes
The Man Who Left His Will on Film	1970	Yes
The Wild Child	1970	Yes
This Transient Life	1970	Yes
Wow	1970	No
A Bee in the Rain	1971	Yes
Blood Thirst	1971	Yes
Demons	1971	Yes
Emperor Tomato Ketchup	1971	Yes
Hydrozagadka	1971	Yes
Johnny Got His Gun	1971	No
Love	1971	Yes
Summer in the City	1971	Yes
The Last Picture Show	1971	Yes
The Salamander	1971	Yes
What Did You Do in the War, Thanassi?	1971	Yes
The Morning Schedule	1972	No
Nathalie Granger	1972	Yes
Savages	1972	No
The Goat Horn	1972	Yes
Tomorrow	1972	Yes
The Stone Wedding	1972	Yes
Coup d'Etat	1973	Yes
John the Violent	1973	Yes
Noël and Juliette	1973	Yes
Old Walls	1973	Yes
Paper Moon	1973	Yes
The Mother and the Whore	1973	Yes
You Are Warm... You Are Warm...	1973	Yes
Alice in the Cities	1974	Yes
Effi Briest	1974	Yes
Je Tu Il Elle	1974	Yes
Lenny	1974	Yes
Lust for Gold	1974	Yes
Pastoral: To Die in the Country	1974	No
Secret Chronicle: She Beast Market	1974	No
The Man Who Sleeps	1974	Yes
The Time of the Beginning	1974	Yes
The Traveler	1974	Yes
Vase de Noces	1974	Yes
Young Frankenstein	1974	Yes
Adoption	1975	Yes
Beni Walks by Himself	1975	Yes
Cinema Paithiyam	1975	Yes
Companion	1975	No
Deafula	1975	Yes
Eiszeit	1975	Yes
Euridice BA 2037	1975	Yes
Hester Street	1975	Yes
John Glückstadt	1975	Yes
Mirror	1975	No
Overlord	1975	Yes
Seasons of the Year	1975	Yes
The Daughter of the Railroad Crossing Guard	1975	Yes
The Noah	1975	Yes
The Other Francisco	1975	Yes
Throne of Capricorn	1975	Yes
Thundercrack!	1975	Yes
Under the Pavement Lies the Strand	1975	Yes
Coup de Grâce	1976	Yes
Kings of the Road	1976	Yes
Agraharathil Kazhutai	1977	Yes
The Ascent	1977	Yes
The Consequence	1977	Yes
Hot Tomorrows	1977	Yes
Eraserhead	1977	Yes
Hitler: A Film from Germany	1977	No
Northern Lights	1978	Yes
The Whole Shootin' Match	1978	Yes
The Hypothesis of the Stolen Painting	1978	Yes
Killer of Sheep	1978	Yes
Stalker	1979	No
Family Nest	1979	Yes
J-Men Forever	1979	Yes
Manhattan	1979	Yes
Radio On	1979	Yes

=== 1980s ===
Film	Year	Exclusively B/W
Forbidden Zone	1980	Yes
Stardust Memories	1980	Yes
The Elephant Man	1980	Yes
Raging Bull	1980	No
Sir Henry at Rawlinson End	1980	Yes
Angels of Iron	1981	Yes
Looks and Smiles	1981	Yes
Muddy River	1981	Yes
Travelling Warrior	1981	Yes
The Rhythm of Crime	1981	Yes
You Are Not I	1981	Yes
Züri Brännt	1981	Yes
The State of Things	1982	Yes
Dead Men Don't Wear Plaid	1982	Yes
Konopielka	1982	Yes
Veronika Voss	1982	Yes
Chassé-croisé	1982	Yes
Chan Is Missing	1982	Yes
Strasek, der Vampir	1982	Yes
Taking Tiger Mountain	1983	Yes
Zelig	1983	No
Rumble Fish	1983	No
Confidentially Yours	1983	Yes
The Gold Diggers	1983	Yes
Le Dernier Combat	1983	Yes
Klassenverhältnisse	1984	Yes
Calamari Union	1984	Yes
Boy Meets Girl	1984	Yes
Bless Their Little Hearts	1984	Yes
Broadway Danny Rose	1984	Yes
Screamplay	1984	Yes
Stranger Than Paradise	1984	Yes
Nothing Lasts Forever	1984	No
The Angelic Conversation	1985	No
Mala Noche	1985	No
Noir et Blanc	1986	Yes
Tree Without Leaves	1986	Yes
Under the Cherry Moon	1986	Yes
She's Gotta Have It	1986	No
To Sleep So as to Dream	1986	Yes
Down by Law	1986	Yes
Wings of Desire	1987	No
Epidemic	1987	Yes
Heat and Sunlight	1987	Yes
My Best Friend's Birthday	1987	Yes
A Hungarian Fairy Tale	1987	Yes
Border Radio	1987	Yes
The Noisy Requiem	1988	Yes
Damnation	1988	Yes
Heart of a Dog	1988	Yes
Hard Times	1988	Yes
L'imperatore di Roma	1988	Yes
Tales from the Gimli Hospital	1988	Yes
Begotten	1989	Yes
Black Rain	1989	Yes
It	1989	No
Roadkill	1989	Yes
The Asthenic Syndrome	1989	No
My 20th Century	1989	Yes
Circus Boys	1989	Yes
O Sangue	1989	Yes
The Pregnant Laddie	1989	Yes
Sidewalk Stories	1989	Yes
Tetsuo: The Iron Man	1989	Yes

=== 1990s ===
Film	Year	Exclusively B/W
Pervyy etazh	1990	Yes
Singapore Sling	1990	Yes
Freeze Die Come to Life	1990	Yes
Twilight	1990	Yes
Archangel	1990	Yes
Korczak	1990	Yes
Ucho	1990	Yes
The Hours and Times	1991	Yes
Night of the Day of the Dawn Part 2	1991	Yes
Europa	1991	No
Kafka	1991	No
A Little Stiff	1991	Yes
Medusa: Dare to Be Truthful	1991	No
Madonna: Truth or Dare	1991	No
No Skin Off My Ass	1991	Yes
Swoon	1992	Yes
La Vie de Bohème	1992	Yes
In the Soup	1992	Yes
Life According to Agfa	1992	Yes
Shadows and Fog	1992	Yes
Man Bites Dog	1992	Yes
The Days	1993	Yes
Anchoress	1993	Yes
En compagnie d'Antonin Artaud	1993	Yes
Suture	1993	Yes
Schindler's List	1993	No
Go Fish	1994	Yes
Ladoni	1994	Yes
Nadja	1994	Yes
Woyzeck	1994	Yes
Sátántangó	1994	Yes
Rhythm Thief	1994	Yes
Federal Hill	1994	Yes
Eclipse	1994	No
Ed Wood	1994	Yes
Clerks	1994	Yes
The Corridor	1995	Yes
Dead Man	1995	Yes
Institute Benjamenta	1995	Yes
La Haine	1995	Yes
Living in Oblivion	1995	No
The Addiction	1995	Yes
A Midwinter's Tale	1995	Yes
Dream for an Insomniac	1996	No
Rubber's Lover	1996	Yes
The Toilers and the Wayfarers	1996	Yes
Bitter Sugar	1996	Yes
Foreign Land	1996	Yes
Growing Artichokes in Mimongo	1996	Yes
Drawing Flies	1996	Yes
Color of a Brisk and Leaping Day	1996	Yes
House of the Damned	1996	Yes
Labyrinth of Dreams	1997	Yes
The Tango Lesson	1997	No
Desert Sky	1997	Yes
Leather Jacket Love Story	1997	Yes
Kasaba	1997	Yes
How to Cheat in the Leaving Certificate	1997	Yes
Happy Together	1997	No
24 7: Twenty Four Seven	1997	Yes
The Cruise	1998	Yes
Pleasantville	1998	No
Khrustalyov, mashinu!	1998	Yes
Pi	1998	Yes
Bullet Ballet	1998	Yes
The Red Dwarf	1998	Yes
Samurai Fiction	1998	Yes
The General	1998	Yes
The City	1998	Yes
Celebrity	1998	Yes
Capuccino	1998	Yes
Following	1998	Yes
Of Freaks and Men	1998	No
Okraina	1998	Yes
The Miracle of P. Tinto	1998	No
Man of the Century	1999	Yes
Judy Berlin	1999	Yes
Juha	1999	Yes
Wisconsin Death Trip	1999	No
Chi Girl	1999	Yes
Tuvalu	1999	No
Zombie! vs. Mardi Gras	1999	Yes
The Woman Chaser	1999	Yes
Girl on the Bridge	1999	Yes

=== 2000s ===
Film	Year	Exclusively B/W
Mysterious Object at Noon	2000	Yes
Devils on the Doorstep	2000	No
Eureka	2000	No
La Commune (Paris, 1871)	2000	Yes
A Snake of June	2000	Yes
Werckmeister Harmonies	2000	Yes
Acne	2000	Yes
Memento	2000	No
The Lost Skeleton of Cadavra	2001	Yes
25 Watts	2001	Yes
Makibefo	2001	Yes
Electric Dragon 80.000 V	2001	Yes
Return to Innocence	2001	No
Bolivia	2001	Yes
The American Astronaut	2001	Yes
Don's Plum	2001	Yes
Planet of the Cannibals	2001	Yes
In Praise of Love	2001	No
The Man Who Wasn't There	2001	Yes
Mongoland	2001	No
Box Head Revolution	2002	Yes
Dracula: Pages from a Virgin's Diary	2002	No
Tamala 2010: A Punk Cat in Space	2002	No
Back Against the Wall	2002	Yes
The Last Letter	2002	Yes
Don't Ask Don't Tell	2002	Yes
Sin Destino	2002	No
Aro Tolbukhin. En la mente del asesino	2002	No
Woodenhead	2003	Yes
The Saddest Music in the World	2003	No
Cowards Bend the Knee	2003	Yes
A Thousand Clouds of Peace	2003	Yes
Coffee and Cigarettes	2003	Yes
Temporada de patos	2004	Yes
I Always Wanted to Be a Gangster	2004	Yes
Late Bloomer	2004	Yes
Evolution of a Filipino Family	2004	Yes
After the Apocalypse	2004	Yes
À tout de suite	2004	Yes
Aaltra	2004	Yes
Sin City	2005	No
Regular Lovers	2005	Yes
I'm Going to Tell You a Secret	2005	No
The Notorious Bettie Page	2005	No
Good Night, and Good Luck	2005	Yes
Dark Horse	2005	No
The Cabinet of Dr. Caligari	2005	Yes
Ashes and Snow	2005	Yes
Angel-A	2005	Yes
The Call of Cthulhu	2005	Yes
Night of the Day of the Dawn Part 3	2005	Yes
Mutual Appreciation	2005	Yes
Mother of Mine	2005	No
Frankenstein vs. the Creature from Blood Cove	2005	Yes
13 Tzameti	2005	Yes
A Short Film About the Indio Nacional (or The Prolonged Sorrow of Filipinos)	2005	Yes
Renaissance	2006	No
Ten Canoes	2006	No
The Bridge	2006	No
Slow Days	2006	Yes
Automatons	2006	Yes
Brand Upon the Brain!	2006	No
Asudem	2006	Yes
Avida	2006	Yes
The Good German	2006	Yes
Destination Mars	2006	Yes
Ten Canoes	2006	No
Factory Girl	2006	No
Clerks II	2006	No
Vermilion Souls	2007	Yes
Persepolis	2007	No
The Mist (Black and white version)	2007	No
The Man from London	2007	Yes
La León	2007	Yes
La Antena	2007	Yes
Life Kills Me	2007	Yes
Dreamscape	2007	Yes
J'ai toujours rêvé d'être un gangster	2007	Yes
Tin Can Man	2007	Yes
...a bude hůř	2007	Yes
In Search of a Midnight Kiss	2007	Yes
Dr. Plonk	2007	Yes
Control	2007	Yes
Honor Guard	2007	Yes
Peščanik	2007	Yes
Zift	2008	Yes
Aegri Somnia	2008	No
Somers Town	2008	No
Frontier of the Dawn	2008	Yes
Fear(s) of the Dark	2008	No
Melancholia	2008	Yes
The White Ribbon	2009	Yes
Tetro	2009	No
Stingray Sam	2009	Yes
Rewers	2009	No
Polytechnique	2009	Yes
City of Life and Death	2009	Yes
Antichrist	2009	No
Dark and Stormy Night	2009	Yes
Guy and Madeline on a Park Bench	2009	Yes
Only Human	2009	Yes
The Lost Skeleton Returns Again	2009	No

=== 2010s ===
Film	Year	Exclusively B/W
A Useful Life	2010	Yes
Dharma Guns	2010	No
Gandu	2010	No
Promises Written in Water	2010	Yes
Lotus Eaters	2011	Yes
For Lovers Only	2011	Yes
The Human Centipede 2 (Full Sequence)	2011	Yes
The Turin Horse	2011	Yes
Keyhole	2011	Yes
The Whisperer in Darkness	2011	Yes
Heleno	2011	Yes
The Day He Arrives	2011	Yes
Manila Kingpin: The Asiong Salonga Story	2011	Yes
Century of Birthing	2011	Yes
Codependent Lesbian Space Alien Seeks Same	2011	Yes
The Color Wheel	2011	Yes
The Artist	2011	Yes
Alois Nebel	2011	Yes
Tabu	2012	Yes
A Coffee in Berlin	2012	Yes
Much Ado About Nothing	2012	Yes
Frankenweenie	2012	Yes
Frances Ha	2012	Yes
Caesar Must Die	2012	No
Blancanieves	2012	Yes
Florentina Hubaldo, CTE	2012	Yes
Artémis, cœur d'artichaut	2013	No
Quod Erat Demonstrandum	2013	Yes
Nebraska	2013	Yes
A Field in England	2013	Yes
Ida	2013	Yes
Escape from Tomorrow	2013	Yes
Computer Chess	2013	No
Hard to Be a God	2013	Yes
L'arbitro	2013	Yes
Village of Hope	2013	Yes
Jealousy	2013	Yes
Thou Gild'st the Even	2013	No
Weekend	2013	Yes
Quatre nuits d'un étranger	2013	Yes
Wolf	2013	Yes
The Role	2013	Yes
From What Is Before	2014	Yes
The Better Angels	2014	Yes
In the Crosswind	2014	Yes
O Fim de uma Era	2014	Yes
Sin City: A Dame to Kill For	2014	No
You're Sleeping Nicole	2014	Yes
A Girl Walks Home Alone at Night	2014	Yes
Güeros	2014	Yes
The Sea Is Behind	2014	Yes
Embrace of the Serpent	2015	No
Chorus	2015	Yes
Bleak Street	2015	Yes
Aferim!	2015	Yes
The Assassin	2015	No
Ausma	2015	Yes
In the Shadow of Women	2015	Yes
Thane of East County	2015	No
Tharlo	2015	Yes
Tikkun	2015	Yes
Darling	2015	Yes
Dongju: The Portrait of a Poet	2016	Yes
The Chronicles of Melanie	2016	Yes
A Lullaby to the Sorrowful Mystery	2016	Yes
The Happiest Day in the Life of Olli Mäki	2016	Yes
Weirdos	2016	Yes
Frantz	2016	No
The Woman Who Left	2016	Yes
The Eyes of My Mother	2016	Yes
Blue Jay	2016	Yes
Cartas da Guerra	2016	Yes
Death by Death	2016	Yes
The Summer Is Gone	2016	No
The Tesla World Light	2017	Yes
The Party	2017	Yes
The Day After	2017	Yes
The Great Buddha+	2017	Yes
I Love You, Daddy	2017	Yes
November	2017	Yes
The Wild Boys	2017	No
Infinity Baby	2017	Yes
3 Days in Quiberon	2018	Yes
Grass	2018	Yes
Cold War	2018	Yes
Empathy, Inc.	2018	Yes
Hotel by the River	2018	Yes
Season of the Devil	2018	Yes
Trouble Is My Business	2018	No
Roma	2018	Yes
The Other Side of the Wind	2018	No
The Divide	2018	Yes
Lake Michigan Monster	2018	Yes
Leto	2018	No
1956, Central Travancore	2019	Yes
The Halt	2019	Yes
The Lighthouse	2019	Yes
The Painted Bird	2019	Yes
Bait	2019	Yes
Beats	2019	No
Kalel, 15	2019	Yes
Saturday Fiction	2019	Yes

=== 2020s ===
Film	Year	Exclusively B/W
Dear Comrades!	2020	Yes
The Forty-Year-Old Version	2020	No
Friend of the World	2020	No
History of the Occult	2020	Yes
Genus Pan	2020	Yes
Mank	2020	Yes
Some Southern Waters	2020	Yes
Služobníci	2020	Yes
Malcolm & Marie	2021	Yes
Guilt	2021	Yes
Belfast	2021	No
C'mon C'mon	2021	Yes
Passing	2021	Yes
The Tragedy of Macbeth	2021	Yes
Limbo	2021	Yes
The Afterlight	2021	Yes
Paris, 13th District	2021	No
Werewolf by Night	2022	No
X=Prem	2022	Yes
8/12 Binay Badal Dinesh	2022	Yes
Vindication Swim	2022	No
Blonde	2022	No
Hundreds of Beavers	2022	Yes
SHTTL	2022	No
Do Not Expect Too Much from the End of the World	2023	No
Fremont	2023	Yes
Life's a Bitch	2023	Yes
Maestro	2023	No
Divinity	2023	Yes
El Conde	2023	No
She Is Conann	2023	No
Farewell Column	2023	Yes
Green Border	2023	Yes
Bheed	2023	Yes
Falling in Love Like in Movies	2023	No
There's Still Tomorrow	2023	Yes
Mami Wata	2023	Yes
Oppenheimer	2023	No
Bramayugam	2024	Yes
Olavum Theeravum	2024	Yes
Samsara	2024	Yes
Sincerely Saul	2024	Yes
La Cocina	2024	Yes
The Girl with the Needle	2024	Yes
Grand Tour	2024	No
In the Hand of Dante	2025	No
Nouvelle Vague	2025	Yes
The Stranger	2025	Yes
The Disappearance of Josef Mengele	2025	Yes
Everybody Digs Bill Evans	2026	Yes
Fatherland	2026	Yes
Flies	2026	Yes
Let Us Through, Dear Ancestors	2026	Yes
Rose	2026	Yes
Tangles	2026	No
The Projectionist	2026	Yes
Ulya	2026	Yes
The Three Incestuous Sisters	TBD	Yes
Wormwood: A German Expressionistic Dystopia	TBD	Yes

== Films with notable black-and-white scenes ==
The following films are less than 50% black-and-white footage, but contain notable scenes in black-and-white.

Film	Year	Notes
The Birthday Party	1968	
Solaris	1972	Numerous black-and-white scenes
The Hindenburg	1975	Final Act in black-and-white
Mishima: A Life in Four Chapters	1985	Flashbacks are black-and-white
They Live	1988	While wearing sunglasses
Center Stage	1991	
Natural Born Killers	1994	Flashbacks are black-and-white
Malena	2000	Dream Sequences are in black-and-white
Kill Bill: Volume 1	2003	
Kill Bill: Volume 2	2004	
Casino Royale	2006	
Oz the Great and Powerful	2013	First 20 minutes are black-and-white
Ek Je Chhilo Raja	2018	Courtroom drama sequences are black-and-white
The French Dispatch	2021	Numerous black-and-white scenes
Thor: Love and Thunder	2022	Fight scene between Gorr and Thor is black-and-white
Asteroid City	2023	Select scenes throughout are black-and-white
Poor Things	2023	First 40 minutes are black-and-white
Dune: Part Two	2024	Harkonnen homeworld scenes are black-and-white
The Phoenician Scheme	2025	Numerous black-and-white sequences
Silent Friend	2025	One of the three main stories are in black-and-white

== Black-and-white versions of color films ==
The following are color films that were also released in black-and-white.

Film	Year	Notes
Nickelodeon	1976	B&W director's cut released in 2009
Trancers	1984	Trancers Noir released in 2025
Puppet Master III: Toulon's Revenge	1991	Puppet Master III: Toulon's Revenge Noir released in 2025
Johnny Mnemonic	1995	Johnny Mnemonic: In Black and White released 2022
Hideous!	1997	Hideous Noir released in 2025
The Creeps	1997	The Creeps Noir released in 2025
Blood Dolls	1999	Blood Dolls Noir version released in 2025
Dr. Moreau's House of Pain	2004	"Noir Version" released in 2025
Doll Graveyard	2005	Doll Graveyard Noir released in 2025
The Mist	2007	B&W version released in 2008
The Haunted Casino	2007	The Haunted Casino Noir released in 2025
Puppet Master: Axis of Evil	2010	Puppet Master: Axis of Evil Noir released in 2025
Puppet Master: Axis Rising	2012	Puppet Master: Axis Rising Noir released in 2025
Mad Max: Fury Road	2015	Mad Max: Black & Chrome released 2016
Shin Godzilla	2016	Shin Godzilla: Orthochromatic released 2023
Puppet Master: Axis Termination	2017	Puppet Master: Axis Termination Noir version released 2025
Logan	2017	Logan Noir released 2017
Parasite	2019	
Zack Snyder's Justice League	2021	Zack Snyder's Justice League: Justice Is Gray released 2021
Nightmare Alley	2021	Nightmare Alley: Vision in Darkness and Light released 2022
Godzilla Minus One	2023	Godzilla Minus One/Minus Color released 2024
Furiosa: A Mad Max Saga	2024	Furiosa: A Mad Max Saga Black & Chrome Edition released 2024
Quadrant	2024	Noir version released in September 2024

== See also ==
- Silent film § Later homages
