= Bratislava International Film Festival =

Annual film festival in Slovakia

Coordinates: 48°08′38″N 17°06′35″E

- Location: Bratislava, Slovakia
- Established: 1999

The Bratislava International Film Festival (also known as Bratislava IFF) is an international film festival held annually in Bratislava, Slovakia. It was established in 1999.

Apart from the international competition programme, it also regularly features renowned authors' film retrospectives, a European film program, independent film programmes and various theme programmes.

== Awards ==
Awards are presented in the following categories:

- Grand Prix for best film in the international competition
- Best Director
- Best Actress
- Best Actor
- FIPRESCI Award for best film, as determined by a jury of film critics

== Award winners ==
=== Grand Prix ===
Year	English title	Original title	Director(s)	Country
1999	The Red Dwarf	Le nain rouge	Yvan Le Moine	Belgium
2000	Ratcatcher	—N/a	Lynne Ramsay	Great Britain
2001	Daughters of the Sun	دختران خورشید	Maryam Shahriar	Iran
2002	Japan	Japón	Carlos Reygadas	Mexico
2003	Bored in Brno	Nuda v Brně	Vladimír Morávek	Czech Republic
2004	Or (My Treasure)	Or (Mon trésor)	Keren Yedaya	Israel
2005	The Cave of the Yellow Dog	Die Höhle des gelben Hundes	Byambasuren Davaa	Mongolia, Germany
2006	4:30	—N/a	Royston Tan	Singapore
2007	Blind Mountain	Mang shan	Li Yang	China
2008	Mid-August Lunch	Pranzo di ferragosto	Gianni Di Gregorio	Italy
2009	The Day God Walked Away	Le jour où Dieu est parti en voyage	Philippe Van Leeuw	Belgium
2010	The Four Times	Le Quattro Volte	Michelangelo Frammartino	Italy
2011	Las Acacias		Pablo Giorgelli	Argentina
2012	The Towrope	La Sirga	William Vega	Colombia
2013	Class Enemy	Razredni sovražnik	Rok Biček	Slovenia
2014	Party Girl		Marie Amachoukeli, Claire Burger, Samuel Theis	France
2015	Land and Shade	La tierra y la sombra	César Augusto Acevedo	Colombia
2016	Tramontane		Vatche Boulghourjian	Lebanon,France,Qatar,United Arab Emirates
2017	Men Don't Cry	Muškarci ne plaču	Alen Drljević	Bosnia and Herzegovina,Slovenia,Croatia,Germany

=== 2003 IFF Bratislava ===
- Grand Prix – Bored in Brno (directed by Vladimír Morávek, Czech Republic)
- Best Director – Li Yang (Blind Shaft, China)
- Best Actress – Kateřina Holánová (Bored in Brno, Czech Republic)
- Best Actor – Maruf Pulodzoda (Angel on the Right, Tajikistan)
- FIPRESCI Award – The Island (directed by Constanza Quatriglio, Italy)

=== 2004 IFF Bratislava ===
- Grand Prix – Or (My Treasure) (directed by Keren Yedaya, Israel)
- Best Director – Atiq Rahimi (Earth and Ashes, Afghanistan)
- Best Actress – Lindsay Duncan and Paula Sage (AfterLife, United Kingdom)
- Best Actor – Pietro Sibille (Days of Santiago, Peru)
- FIPRESCI Award – Private Madness (directed by Joachim Lafosse, Belgium)

=== 2005 IFF Bratislava ===
- Grand Prix – The Cave of the Yellow Dog (directed by Byambasuren Davaa, Mongolia)
- Best Director – George Clooney (Good Night, and Good Luck., United States)
- Best Actress – Stephanie James (A Way of Life, United Kingdom)
- Best Actor – Pavel Liška (Something Like Happiness, Czech Republic)
- FIPRESCI Award – Everything Is Illuminated (directed by Liev Schreiber, United States)

=== 2006 IFF Bratislava ===
- Grand Prix – 4:30 (directed by Royston Tan, Singapore)
- Best Director – Amat Escalante (Blood, Mexico)
- Best Actress – Hermila Guedes (Suely in the Sky, Brazil)
- Best Actor – Antoni Pawlicki (Retrieval, Poland)
- FIPRESCI Award – Retrieval (directed by Slawomir Fabicki, Poland)

=== 2007 IFF Bratislava ===
- Grand Prix – Blind Mountain (directed by Li Yang, China)
- Best Director – Veiko Õunpuu (The Autumn Ball, Estonia)
- Best Actress – Julie Kolbeck (The Art of Crying, Denmark)
- Best Actor – Sam Riley (Control, United Kingdom)
- FIPRESCI Award – Tricks (directed by Andrzej Jakimowski, Poland)

=== 2008 IFF Bratislava ===
- Grand Prix – Mid–August Lunch (directed by Gianni Di Gregorio, Italy)
- Best Director – Amat Escalante (The Bastards, Mexico, France, United States)
- Best Actress – Nada Abou Farhat (Under the Bombs, Lebanon, France, United Kingdom, Belgium)
- Best Actor – Zsolt Anger (The Investigator, Hungary, Sweden, Ireland)
- FIPRESCI Award – Under the Bombs (directed by Philippe Aractingi, Lebanon, France, United Kingdom, Belgium)

=== 2009 IFF Bratislava ===
- Grand Prix – The Day God Walked Away (directed by Philippe Van Leeuw, Belgium, France)
- Best Director – Kamen Kalev (Eastern Plays, Bulgaria, Sweden)
- Best Actress – Ruth Nirere (The Day God Walked Away, France, Belgium)
- Best Actor – Christo Christov (Eastern Plays, Bulgaria, Sweden)– Ex-aequo / Post-mortem
- Best Actor – Harold Torres (Northless, Mexico, Spain)– Ex-aequo
- FIPRESCI Award – Northless (directed by Rigoberto Perezcano, Mexico, Spain)
- Special mention – Northless (directed by Rigoberto Perezcano, Mexico, Spain)
- Ecumenical Jury Award – Kamen Kalev (Eastern Plays, Bulgaria, Sweden)
- Ecumenical Jury Award special mention – Optical Illusions (directed by Cristian Jiménez, Chile, France)
- Student Jury Award – Whisper With the Wind (directed by Shahram Alidi, Iraq)
- Best Documentary Film – Petition (directed by Zhao Liang, France, China)
- Best Short Film – Rita (directed by Zhao Liang, Italy)
- Shorts Jury special mention – A Man Overboard (directed by Fabien Gorgeart, France)
- Shorts Jury special mention – Party (directed by Dalibor Matanić, Croatia)
- The IFF Bratislava Award for Artistic Excellence in World Cinematography – Juraj Herz (director)

=== 2010 IFF Bratislava ===
- Grand Prix – The Four Times (directed by Michelangelo Frammartino, Italy, Germany, Switzerland)
- Best Director
  - Dragomir Sholev (Shelter, Bulgaria)
  - Constantine Popescu (Portrait of the Fighter As A Young Man)
- Best Actress – Charlotte Gainsbourg (The Tree, France, Australia)
- Best Actor – Robert Naylor (10½, Canada)

=== 2011 IFF Bratislava ===
- Grand Prix – Las Acacias (directed by Pablo Giorgelli, Argentina, Spain)
- Best Director – Vincent Garenq (Guilty, France)
- Best Actress – Iben Hjejle (Stockholm East, Sweden)
- Best Actor – Ivan Trojan (Visible World, Czech Republic)
