= Li Yixiang =

Chinese actor

Li Yixiang (Chinese: 李易祥), also known as Li Qiang (李强), is a Chinese actor. He appeared in movies such as Ji Quan Bu Ning, Crazy Lottery. In 2002, he starred as one of the two murderous con men in director Li Yang's Blind Shaft, opposite Wang Baoqiang as his naive and young would-be victim. Li shared the Golden Kinnaree for Best Actor at the 2004 Bangkok International Film Festival along with Wang, and fellow Blind Shaft co-star, Wang Shuangbao.

Li went on to star in Lost and Found, Ma Liwen's black comedy about a migrant worker in Beijing.

== Selected filmography ==
Year	Title	Role	Notes
2001	Bus 44 车四十四	Short bandit	
2003	Blind Shaft 盲井	Song Jinming	
2006	One Foot Off the Ground 鸡犬不宁	Ma San	
2007	Crazy Lottery	Wang Wei	
2008	Lost and Found 我叫刘跃进	Liu Yuejin	
2009	Lao Wu's Oscar	Lao Wu	
2009	Invisible Killer		
2010	No Kidding		
2010	The Myth	Liu Bang	TV series
2012	Just for Fun		
2019	The Last Judgement		
2019	Rolling Steel Eggs		
