= Dagon (short story) =

1919 short story by H. P. Lovecraft

- Short story by H. P. Lovecraft
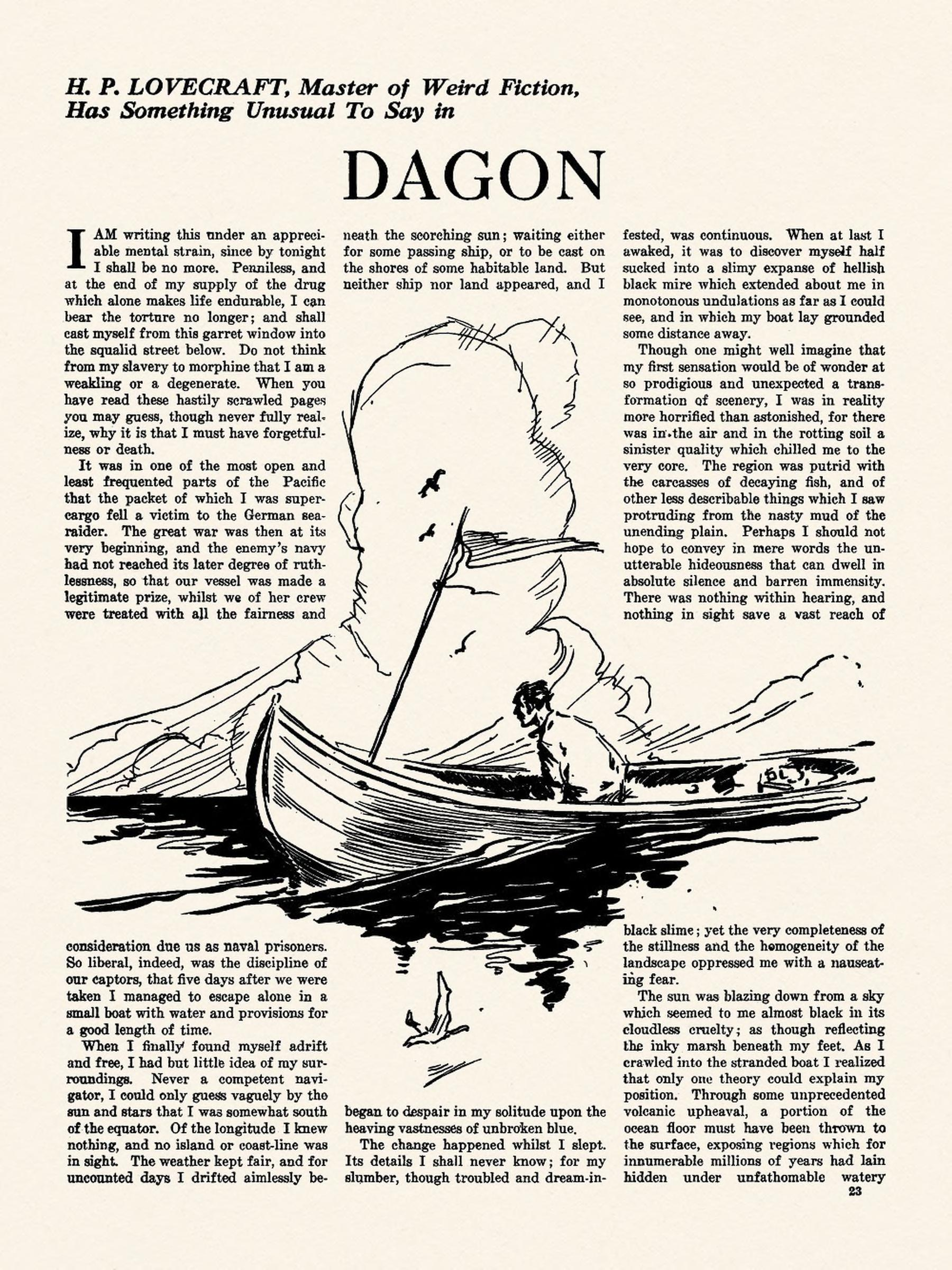
- Title page of "Dagon" as it appeared in Weird Tales, October 1923, where it was published for the second time. Illustration by William Heitman

Text available at Wikisource
- Country: United States
- Language: English
- Genre: Horror

Publication
- Published in: The Vagrant
- Publication date: November, 1919

"Dagon" is a short story by American author H. P. Lovecraft. It was written in July 1917 and is one of the first stories that Lovecraft wrote as an adult. It was first published in the November 1919 edition of The Vagrant (issue #11). Dagon was later published in Weird Tales in October 1923. It is considered by many to be one of Lovecraft's most forward-looking stories.

== Plot ==
The story is the testament of a tortured, morphine-addicted man who relates an incident that occurred during his service as an officer during World War I. In the unnamed narrator's account, his cargo ship is captured by an Imperial German sea-raider in "one of the most open and least frequented parts of the broad Pacific". He escapes on a lifeboat and drifts aimlessly, south of the equator, until he eventually finds himself stranded on "a slimy expanse of hellish black mire which extended about [him] in monotonous undulations as far as [he] could see.... The region was putrid with the carcasses of decaying fish and less describable things which [he] saw protruding from the nasty mud of the unending plain." He theorizes that this area was formerly a portion of the ocean floor thrown to the surface by volcanic activity, "exposing regions which for innumerable millions of years had lain hidden under unfathomable watery depths."

After waiting three days for the seafloor to dry out sufficiently to walk on, he ventures out on foot to find the sea and possible rescue. After two days of walking, he reaches his goal, a hill which turns out to be a mound on the edge of an "immeasurable pit or canyon". Descending the slope, he sees a gigantic white stone object that he soon perceives to be a "well-shaped monolith whose massive bulk had known the workmanship and perhaps the worship of living and thinking creatures." The monolith, situated next to a channel of water in the bottom of the chasm, is covered in unfamiliar hieroglyphs "consisting for the most part of conventionalized aquatic symbols such as fishes, eels, octopuses, crustaceans, mollusks, whales, and the like." There are also "crude sculptures" depicting:

men—at least, a certain sort of men; though the creatures were shewn disporting like fishes in the waters of some marine grotto, or paying homage at some monolithic shrine which appeared to be under the waves as well... [T]hey were damnably human in general outline despite webbed hands and feet, shockingly wide and flabby lips, glassy, bulging eyes, and other features less pleasant to recall. Curiously enough, they seemed to have been chiseled badly out of proportion with their scenic background; for one of the creatures was shewn in the act of killing a whale represented as but little larger than himself.

As the narrator looks at the monolith, a creature emerges from the water:

With only a slight churning to mark its rise to the surface, the thing slid into view above the dark waters. Vast, Polyphemus-like, and loathsome, it darted like a stupendous monster of nightmares to the monolith, about which it flung its gigantic scaly arms, the while it bowed its hideous head and gave vent to certain measured sounds.

Horrified, the mariner flees back to his stranded boat and vaguely recalls a "great storm". His next memory is of a San Francisco hospital, where he was taken after being rescued in mid-ocean by a U.S. ship. There are no reports of any Pacific upheavals, and he does not expect anyone to believe his incredible story. He mentions one abortive attempt to gain understanding of his experience:

Once I sought out a celebrated ethnologist, and amused him with peculiar questions regarding the ancient Philistine legend of Dagon, the Fish-God; but soon perceiving that he was hopelessly conventional, I did not press my inquiries.

Haunted by visions of the creature, "especially when the moon is gibbous and waning", he describes his fears for the future of humanity:

I cannot think of the deep sea without shuddering at the nameless things that may at this very moment be crawling and floundering on its slimy bed, worshipping their ancient stone idols and carving their own detestable likenesses on submarine obelisks of water-soaked granite. I dream of a day when they may rise above the billows to drag down in their reeking talons the remnants of puny, war-exhausted mankind—of a day when the land shall sink, and the dark ocean floor shall ascend amidst universal pandemonium.

With the drug that has given him "transient surcease" running out, he declares himself ready to do himself in; the narrative is revealed to be a suicide note. The story ends with the narrator hearing "a noise at the door, as of some immense slippery body lumbering against it" before shouting "God, that hand! The window! The window!"

== Inspiration ==
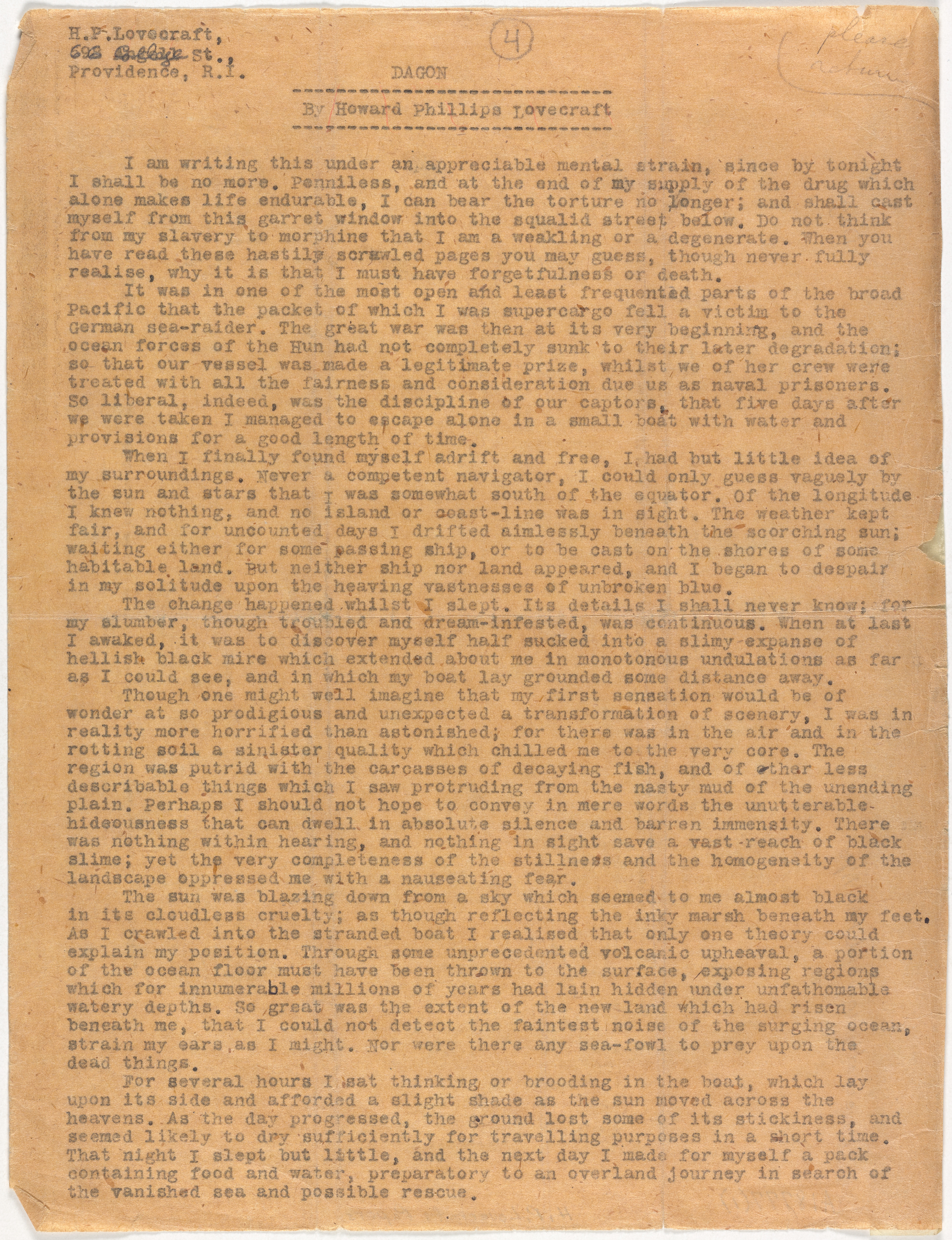
First page of the typescript.

After reading Lovecraft's juvenilia in 1917, W. Paul Cook, editor of the amateur press journal The Vagrant, encouraged him to resume writing fiction. That summer, Lovecraft wrote two stories: "The Tomb" and "Dagon". The story was inspired in part by a dream he had. "I dreamed that whole hideous crawl, and can yet feel the ooze sucking me down!" he later wrote.

The story mentions the Piltdown Man, which had not been exposed by the scientific community as an alleged fraud and hoax at the time of writing.

As to the name of the story, Lovecraft seems to be referring to the ancient Sumerian god named Dagon who is the fertility god of grains and fish, because in the story, the main character makes inquiries "....regarding the ancient Philistine legend of Dagon, the Fish-God."

== Cthulhu Mythos ==
Dagon is the first of Lovecraft's stories to introduce a Cthulhu Mythos element—the sea deity Dagon itself. Worship of Dagon later appeared in Lovecraft's tale "The Shadow over Innsmouth".

The creature that appears in the story is often identified with the deity Dagon, but the creature is not identified by that name in the story "Dagon", and seems to be depicted as a typical member of his species, a worshipper rather than an object of worship. It's unlikely that Lovecraft intended "Dagon" to be the name used by the deity's nonhuman worshippers, as Robert M. Price points out: "When Lovecraft wanted to convey something like the indigenous name of one of the Old Ones, he coined some unpronounceable jumble".

Price suggests that readers of "The Shadow Over Innsmouth" may be mistaken as to the identity of the "Dagon" worshipped by that story's Deep Ones: in contrast to the Old Ones' alien-sounding names, "the name 'Dagon' is a direct borrowing from familiar sources, and implies that [Obed] Marsh and his confederates had chosen the closest biblical analogy to the real object of worship of the deep ones, namely Great Cthulhu."

Lin Carter, who thought "Dagon" an "excellent" story, remarked that it was "an interesting prefiguring of themes later to emerge in [Lovecraft's] Cthulhu stories. The volcanic upheaval that temporarily exposes long-drowned horrors above the waves, for example, reappears in "The Call of Cthulhu" (1926)". Other parallels between the two stories include a horrifying tale told by a sailor rescued at sea; a gigantic, sea-dwelling monster (compared to Polyphemus in each tale); an apocalyptic vision of humanity's destruction at the hands of ancient nonhuman intelligences; and a narrator who fears he is doomed to die because of the knowledge he has gained. S. T. Joshi and David E. Schultz call the latter story "manifestly an exhaustive reworking of 'Dagon'".

In "The Call of Cthulhu", one of the newspaper clippings collected by the late Professor Angell mentions a suicide from a window that may correspond to the death of the narrator of "Dagon".

== Adaptations ==
- Director Stuart Gordon and screenwriter Dennis Paoli, who worked together on Re-Animator, created a film titled Dagon in 2001. Though the film credits both Lovecraft's "Dagon" and his "The Shadow Over Innsmouth," much more of the plot is (loosely) adapted from the latter story.
- The H. P. Lovecraft Historical Society released an audio adaptation of "Dagon" in 2015, as part of their Dark Adventure Radio Theatre series. Titled Dagon: War of Worlds, the audio drama is an original drama that both adapts "Dagon" and serves as a sequel to their earlier adaptation of "The Shadow Over Innsmouth", as well as included characters from their film version of The Whisperer in Darkness and parodies of the 1938 The War of the Worlds broadcast.
- Gou Tanabe adapted the story into a manga in 2016.

== Other appearances ==
- A reference to Dagon appears in "The Shadow Over Innsmouth" (1936), one of Lovecraft's best-known stories. The tale concerns a town in Massachusetts that has been taken over by the Deep Ones, a race of water-dwelling humanoids. A center of the Deep Ones' power in Innsmouth is the Esoteric Order of Dagon, ostensibly a Masonic-style fraternal order. Other Cthulhu Mythos stories refer to the creature as Father Dagon, depicting him as having a similar being, Mother Hydra, as a mate.
- Fred Chappell, considered a literary writer, wrote a novel called Dagon, which attempted to tell a Cthulhu Mythos story as a psychologically realistic Southern Gothic novel. The novel was awarded the Best Foreign Novel Prize by the French Academy in 1972.
- In Mahou Sentai Magiranger, the leader of the Infershia Pantheon Gods is named Dagon, who is based on the Lovecraft character and the Creature from the Black Lagoon.
- In the roleplaying game Dungeons & Dragons, Dagon is the name shared by both a demon prince of the Abyss and an outcast devil. The former maintains a similar flavor to the Lovecraftian version.
- A song by symphonic metal band Therion, "Call of Dagon", includes the lyric "Call of Dagon!/The Deep One is calling you".
- In Terry Pratchett's humorous science fiction novel The Dark Side of the Sun, the Dagon are large, aquatic bivalve-like creatures which are the focus of a rural fishing industry.
- Terry Pratchett's Discworld series have recurring references to an unexplained and disturbing incident that took place at Mr Hong's fish shop on Dagon Street. This is particularly linked to 'Dagon' in the novel Jingo which concerns the sudden resurfacing of the long-sunken and Cyclopean ruins of alien Leshp.
- The experimental industrial group Dead Man's Hill released a CD in 2005 entitled Esoterica Orde De Dagon.
- In 2008, Marvel Comics revived the horror series Haunt of Horror, this time focusing on the works of H.P. Lovecraft. The first issue presented an illustrated version of "Dagon", as well as a reproduction of the original text. The adaptation was written and illustrated by Richard Corben.
- Karl Sanders of the death metal band Nile released a solo album entitled Saurian Meditation which uses a quote from the fictional Unaussprechlichen Kulten on the back cover which is a reworking of the final sentences of Dagon. In addition, Dagon is referenced in Nile's album Those Whom the Gods Detest, with the title track entitled "4th Arra of Dagon."
- In The Illuminatus! Trilogy, Lovecraft (as character in the novel) says that he wrote the story after doing research on Dagon at the Miskatonic University library. The publishing of the story leads to him being drawn to the attention of the Illuminati.
- The 32nd issue of The Brave and the Bold is heavily based on the works of Lovecraft, and features a scene where a shipwrecked sailor finds refuge upon a black mire similar to the one depicted in "Dagon".
- In the video game Call of Cthulhu: Dark Corners of the Earth, Dagon appears from the depth of the sea while the main protagonist, Jack Walters, is travelling with the coast guard on the cutter USS Urania. The ship is wrecked by Dagon, but not before Jack manages to seriously wound (possibly kill) Dagon with several shots from the ship's main gun. As it sinks, Jack Walters is washed ashore on a reef close by (referred to in-game as the Devil's Reef). A tunnel rests near this reef, leading down to the underwater city Y'ha-nthlei, where Walters also stumbles upon the Temple of Dagon itself. The overall story of the game seems heavily influenced by the original "Dagon" short story, as well as The Shadow Over Innsmouth and "The Call of Cthulhu".
- In Shadows over Innsmouth by Fedogan & Bremer 1994, Brian Lumley published the story "Dagon's Bell". This involves the narrator, William Trafford, and his dealing with a colony of Deep Ones at Kettlethorpe Farm in England.
- In Ben 10: Ultimate Alien, the character Dagon is an interdimensional entity with a tentacled appearance akin to Cthulhu.
- In Arcana Studio's 2017 animated feature Howard Lovecraft and the Undersea Kingdom, Dagon is featured as the ruler of the Undersea Kingdom (Y'ha-nthlei).
- In the anime and manga series Jujutsu Kaisen, Dagon is a curse, a monster born from the fear humans feel about the ocean. The character's humanoid octopus-like appearance bears some resemblance to Cthulhu's description present in "The Call of Cthulhu".
- In The Elder Scrolls IV: Oblivion, antagonist Mehrunes Dagon is a Daedric deity that threatens all planetary life, named in part as a reference to Dagon, although he bears more resemblance to humanoid Hindu gods than to any Great One.

== Sources ==
- Lovecraft, Howard P. [1923] (1986). "Dagon". In S. T. Joshi (ed.). Dagon and Other Macabre Tales (9th corrected printing ed.). Sauk City, WI: Arkham House. ISBN 0-87054-039-4. Definitive version.
