= Rebecca Lord =

French pornographic actress

- Born: February 16, 1973 (age 53); Paris, France
- Other names: Rebecca Carre; Rebecca Bruns; Rebecca Lords
- Occupation: Pornographic actress
- Years active: 1993–present
- Height: 5 ft 6 in (1.68 m)
- Website: rebeccalord.com

Rebecca Lord (born in 1973) is a French pornographic actress, director, and producer who has been active since 1993. Soon after her first experience in the porn industry, she moved U.S., where she achieved popularity, appearing in over 200 porn movies (as of 2007). She is the owner of Rebecca Lord Productions. In 2013, Rebecca Lord was inducted into the AVN Hall of Fame.

== Early years ==
Originally from Paris, France, Lord attended parochial school while growing up, an experience she says led her to become a resolute atheist. As a young adult, she was a make-up artist, until 1993, when she answered a newspaper ad seeking a model for a pornographic movie directed by Patrice Cabanel. In her earliest movies, she appeared under the names "Rebecca Carre" and "Rebecca Bruns". In 1994, French director David Caroll gave her the stage name "Rebecca Lords" as a reference to Traci Lords. While listing her name in the credits, however, he mistakenly omitted the "S", and her name became "Rebecca Lord", which she has used ever since.

== Career rise ==
In 1994, Lord was discovered by Swedish porn director Nic Cramer and appeared in two of his videos, Euro-max 2 and Euro-max 3. This introduced her to the American porn industry. She soon left France for Los Angeles and quickly established herself in the porn industry there. She has since appeared in over 200 porn movies (as of 2007). Lord has directed and produced several of the videos she has starred in, through her company, Rebecca Lord Productions, as well as actively maintaining an internet paysite. She became much less active in porn movies after 2003, though, in several posts on her website (in July 2004, November 2005, and March 2007), Lord denied rumors that she had retired.

She has used condoms in some of her sex scenes with men and has noted that the pressure on actresses to work without condoms has caused her some difficulty in the industry. Throughout her porn career she has been married to the same man, who she has been with since the age of 17.

In 2013, Rebecca Lord was inducted into the AVN Hall of Fame.

== Other work ==
In 1998, Lord appeared in the music video for the George Michael song "Outside". She has also appeared on The Howard Stern Show twice in November 1999 and once in June 2001. The last appearance was particularly notable for comments Lord and Stern made about the Catholic Church, which led the Catholic League for Religious and Civil Rights to call for Miller Brewing to drop its sponsorship of the show. (Miller chose not to drop its advertising from the show.)

In 2005, she made a breakthrough into non-pornographic cinema, co-starring in the 2005 independent film I Am a Sex Addict. Lord plays the first wife of director and star Caveh Zahedi, whom Zahedi claims bore a striking resemblance to Lord. In one scene where Zahedi breaks from the narrative and addresses the audience directly, he announces his discovery over an internet site that co-star Rebecca Lord was a porn actress and escort, something he claims not to have known when he first hired Lord for the role. (The subject of the film was Zahedi's addiction to prostitutes).

During her time in the US, Lord has lived in Los Angeles, Las Vegas, San Francisco, and New York City. As of 2007, she has lived in France. She has stated that Las Vegas and New York are her two favorite cities and that she plans to move back to one or the other city in the future.

She published her autobiography, To My Dear Civilians, With Love, (co-authored by Brian Whitney) in February 2016.
