= I Am a Sex Addict =

2005 film by Caveh Zahedi

- theatrical poster
- Directed by: Caveh Zahedi
- Written by: Caveh Zahedi
- Produced by: Thomas Logoreci; Greg Watkins; Caveh Zahedi
- Starring: Caveh Zahedi; Rebecca Lord
- Cinematography: Greg Watkins
- Edited by: Thomas Logoreci; Caveh Zahedi
- Music by: Hilary Soldati
- Distributed by: IFC Films
- Release date: October 14, 2005
- Running time: 98 minutes
- Country: United States
- Language: English
- Box office: $120,790

I Am a Sex Addict is a 2005 autobiographical comedy film by American independent director and screenwriter Caveh Zahedi. Presented in semi-documentary style, the film chronicles Zahedi's own sex addiction and its impact on his life, relationships, and film making. His addiction was manifested by visiting prostitutes, and being open about this with his successive partners.

The film premiered at the International Film Festival Rotterdam and was subsequently picked up for distribution by IFC Films. It aired on The Movie Channel and Showtime in 2007, and subsequently has been shown on the Sundance Channel in the United States.

Though not formal sequels, but in chronological order; his 2001 film In the Bathtub of the World documents his life from where I Am a Sex Addict ends and his 2015 web series The Show About The Show continues 15 year later from where the latter ends.

== Cast ==
- Caveh Zahedi as Caveh
- Rebecca Lord as Caroline
- Emily Morse as Christa
- Amanda Henderson as Devin
- Greg Watkins as Greg
- Olia Natasha as French prostitute
- Corinna Chan as Asian prostitute
- Stephanie Carwin as Italian prostitute
- Monika Hoyt as German prostitute
- Kat Voldal as German prostitute
- Natalia Tikhonova as German prostitute
- Katarina Fabic as L.A. prostitute
- Susan Shah as New York prostitute
- Alexandra Guerineaud as French prostitute
- Mara Luthane as Newscaster
- Bruna Matsin as French prostitute
- Anastasia Gershman as Oscar presenter
- Jasmine Raff as German brothel prostitute
- Vicca as German brothel prostitute
