= Blind Mountain =

- Film poster
- Directed by: Li Yang
- Written by: Li Yang
- Produced by: Li Yang
- Starring: Huang Lu
- Cinematography: Jong Lin
- Edited by: Li Yang; Mary Stephen
- Distributed by: StudioCanal; Tang Splendour Films
- Release date: May 2, 2007 (Cannes)
- Running time: 95 minutes
- Country: China
- Languages: Shaanxi dialect Sichuan dialect
- Budget: €600,000 ($809,000)

Blind Mountain (Chinese: 盲山; pinyin: Máng shān) is a 2007 Chinese film directed by Li Yang. It was Li's first feature film since his 2003 debut Blind Shaft. The film is also known as Road Home. (Note: Not to be confused with Zhang Yimou's 1999 film, The Road Home.)

Like Li's previous film, Blind Shaft, which dealt with the notoriously dangerous mining industry, Blind Mountain turns a sharply critical eye towards the issue of women being sold for marriage in China.

== Plot ==
Blind Mountain follows a young woman, Bai Xuemei, in the early 1990s who is looking for work to fund her brother's education and pay off her parents' debts after they paid for her to go through college. After a month of fruitless searching, some people offer her a well paid job; however, this is a trick and instead they drug her and then pretend to be her family and sell her as a bride to a villager in the Qin Mountains of China's Shaanxi province.

Trapped in the fiercely traditional village, where her documents have been taken away and she is physically restrained at times, the young woman finds her avenues of escape are blocked. As she searches for allies, including a boy, a school teacher and a mailman, she experiences rape by her "husband" and beatings at the hands of the villagers, her husband, and his parents.

== Cast ==
- Huang Lu as Bai Xuemei, the heroine, a young college graduate
- Yang You'an as Huang Degui, a villager who purchases Bai Xuemei
- Zhang Yuling as Ding Xiuying, Huang Degui's mother
- He Yunle as Huang Decheng, a local teacher and Huang Degui's cousin
- Jia Yinggao as Huang Changyi, Huang Degui's father
- Zhang Youping as Li Qingshan, a local boy who befriends Bai Xuemei

== Production history ==
The film was primarily funded by private, overseas Chinese donors. The cast was primarily non-professional actors with the notable exception of the lead, Huang Lu, who was cast from the Beijing Film Academy before she had even graduated.

Before its release, Blind Mountain suffered from nearly 20 state-imposed cuts. This was done for the film to be allowed into the Un Certain Regard competition at Cannes by Chinese officials, as several of the cuts were of scenes that were critical of certain aspects of Chinese society. The Chinese Film Bureau policy also led to Li filming alternate versions of the film's ending including a more upbeat one specifically for a possible video or DVD release in China.

The actor who acted as the abducted woman Zheng Xiaolan in the film was actually cajoled into that village from a county in Sichuan. Li Yang said: "We only found out when we were filming... She came to the production team every day, and we let her act later. Her husband disagreed and beat her, then she said to him: If you beat me again, I will leave with the production team! Her husband didn't dare to beat her again, and then I told the assistant director to let the husband also play a role. Anyway, it was the slack season, and the crew manages 3 meals a day, and even paid for the baby she held.”

== Reception ==
Along with Diao Yi'nan's Night Train, Blind Mountain was one of only two Chinese films in competition in the 2007 Cannes Film Festival, both for the Prix Un Certain Regard. A third Chinese film, Fengming, a Chinese Memoir by Wang Bing was a documentary and was a "Special Screening" not in competition. Blind Mountain ultimately failed to win anything at Cannes, with the Prix Un Certain Regard going instead to Cristian Nemescu's California Dreamin'.

While the audience at Cannes gave a standing ovation to Blind Mountain when it was screened, the critics were mixed in their reaction. Ray Bennett of The Hollywood Reporter, for example, was generous in his praise of the film's social message and visual beauty, claiming that the Li "draws wonderful performances from a cast that includes local amateurs and professionals, including the utterly credible Huang Lu." In contrast, Derek Elley of Variety was far more subdued in his reaction, and in particular criticized the thin story and poorly drawn characters, such that "there's little emotional underpinning to the rote story." What both critics agreed was above par, however, was the photography of the Taiwanese cinematographer Jong Lin. Other critics expressed sentiments similar to Elley but nevertheless found the performances effective, particularly by the lead actress.

Reception was more positive with the Chinese press. Writing in Hong Kong cultural magazine, Muse, Perry Lam observed, "What makes this film so heartbreaking and so hard to watch sometimes is its determination to let us experience without varnish the depths of the heroine's despair and meet all the wretched characters who have a role to play in her tragedy."

On April 19, 2008, Blind Mountain won the Film Award of the Council of Europe (FACE), which is presented at the Istanbul International Film Festival by the Council of Europe to a film that raises public awareness and interest in human rights issues and promotes a better understanding of their significance.

=== Awards and nominations ===
- 2007 International Film Festival Bratislava
  - Grand Prix (describing the film as "masterful")
  - Special Mention of the Ecumenical Jury
- 2008 Istanbul International Film Festival
  - Film Award of the Council of Europe (FACE), for raising public awareness and interest in human rights issues and promoting a better understanding of their significance.

== Alternate version ==
Blind Mountain was filmed with several endings to satisfy the Chinese film censorship board. The rather short and abrupt ending in the international DVD has the main character of Bai Xuemei stabbing the "husband," who forcefully married and raped her, during a personal brawl with Xuemei's father after the police leave the village.

The ending that appears on the Chinese DVD is more of a "happy" yet ironic ending when the police show up at Bai Xuemei's house days later, drug and fend off the husband and rescue her. At the same time, other girls who were sold into marriage in the village are rescued, but her best friend (who was also sold into marriage) suddenly decides to stay for her child and gets out of the police car. Bai Xuemei's child is left without a mother, and the family of her "husband" is left with no daughter-in-law. The ending concludes with text about the ongoing problem of human trafficking in modern-day China. More than 30 cuts were required by Chinese censors for it be approved for exhibition.
