= Dav Dralleon =

French music project

- Born: David
- Origin: Nevers, France
- Genres: Synthwave, Metalsynth, Darksynth
- Years active: 2016-present
- Label: Playmaker Media
- Website: https://davdralleon.bandcamp.com/

Dav Dralleon is a French single artist music project originating from Nevers, with instrumental musical style focusing on synthwave, and its metal leaning subgenres metalsynth and darksynth.

== Biography ==
The name "Dav Dralleon" is a pseudonym for a French darksynth artist David, who transitioned into synthwave subgenres after playing guitar for the metalcore band Pangora. The project originates from a "2d indie platformer game" soundtrack with 4 songs, which later evolved into its own independent musical entity when the game never launched. The solo artist behind the project has largely remained anonymous, and was influenced by other French synthwave artists such as Perturbator to shift to electro synth music with metal influences.

The music of Dav Dralleon has common themes of a world-ending apocalypse as well as Lovecraftian horror, with direct references to such creatures as Dagon or Cthulhu. Following a series of EPs and singles with these themes over the years, the 2021 debut album Fall Ov Men was well received. The 2022 album Kthullu has similarly been favorably received. Physical copies of Dav Dralleon's music and merchandise have been distributed under the Belgian label Playmaker Media.

Dav Dralleon has no plans for live performances based on a 2020 interview with Nightride FM.

The dystopian and dark tone in the musical works of Dav Dralleon are inspired by real-life phenomena such as natural disasters, over-consumption, and pollution, sci-fi works such as the movies Terminator and Blade Runner, and his personal stances for environmental protection and animal rights.

== Discography ==
Adapted from Bandcamp, and Spotify.

=== Albums ===
- Fall Ov Men (April 2021, Playmaker Media)
- Kthullu (November 2022, Playmaker Media)
- STREET KRVZADER (February 2024)
- GODSLAYER (November 2025)

=== Singles ===
- Alteredeath (November 2018)
- Wolvesquad (March 2019)
- Horizon Set Ablaze (April 2019)
- Arkangel Firespawn (July 2020)
- Vulkandeth (October 2020)
- Metatron (November 2020)
- Vampyr Golgotha (January 2021)
- Annihilation Dogma (May 2021), feat. Void Stare
- Death May Die (December 2021)
- The Frozen Lake (March 2022)
- A Cosmic Sacrifice to Dagon (April 2022)
- Voodoo Shub-Niggurath (June 2022)
- Final Ascent (July 2022)
- Dungeon Xoth Octoterror (October 2022)
- Street Krvzader (April 2023)
- Zantetsuken (June 2023)
- Vulkan Force (September 2023)
- Ryu Cyberblade (October 2023)

=== EPs ===
- Depths (June 2018)
- Holywrath (September 2019)
- Everflame (February 2020)
