= 2004 Bangkok International Film Festival =

Edition of film festival

Official poster for the 2004 Bangkok International Film Festival

The 2004 Bangkok International Film Festival started on January 22 and ran until February 2. The Golden Kinnaree Awards were announced on January 31.

== Awards ==
=== Golden Kinnaree International Competition ===
- Best Film: The Barbarian Invasions (Canada)
- Best Director: Jim Sheridan (In America, Ireland)
- Best Actor: Li Yixiang, Wang Shungbao and Wang Baoqiang (Blind Shaft, China)
- Best Actress: Giovanna Mezzogiorno (Facing Windows, Italy)
- Best ASEAN film: Last Life in the Universe (Thailand)

=== Asian Shorts and Documentary ===
- Best Short Documentary: Broken Blossom (Japan)
- Best Live Action: The Anniversary (Vietnam)
- Best Animation: 3 Feet Apart (Singapore)
- Jameson Short Film Award: Mekong Interior (France)

=== Special awards ===
- Lifetime Achievement Award: Rattana Pestonji
- Career Achievement Award: Oliver Stone
- Crystal Lens Award: Christopher Doyle
