= Film Award of the Council of Europe =

Human rights filmmaking award

The Council of Europe Film Award (FACE) is presented at the Istanbul International Film Festival by the Council of Europe to the director whose entry to the festival raises public awareness and interest in human rights issues and promotes a better understanding of their significance.

== Context ==
Between 1950 and 1970, Turkey was among the world's top most prolific film industries. Those films reflected the changes in Turkish society, addressing domestic violence, the role of women, problems of rural exodus and urban poverty, contributing to develop inclusiveness and respect for human rights within the country lines. Turkey's movie industry was severely hit when the international competition and modern production techniques changed the cinema industry.

The FACE award has been established as an annual collaboration between the International Istanbul Film Festival and the Council of Europe. Maud de Boer-Buquicchio, Deputy Secretary-General of the Council of Europe, said during the 2010 edition "The reason why we decided to team up with the prestigious Istanbul Film Festival is simple: while we believe that films cannot change the world, they can make us reflect and challenge us to change the world ourselves. This is all the more true when human rights are at stake". The FACE considers cinema as not only an important expression of European culture, but also a compass that can help to map out a route towards the Europe of the future – one that celebrates diversity and difference, that promotes equal opportunities for all its citizens, and that challenges abuse and intolerance.

== Procedure and prize ==
The Council of Europe manages Eurimages, the body that funds the co-production and distribution of films and fosters co-operation between professionals. It is also home to the European Audiovisual Observatory, the only centre of its kind to gather and circulate information on the audiovisual industry in Europe, including cinema, television, and radio.

The presentation of the FACE award is destined to honor an artistic or documentary film that raises the profile of human rights in accordance with the values of the Council of Europe and the principles it stands for: individual freedom, political liberty and the rule of law.

The contribution winning the FACE award is selected by a jury from the entries in the "Human Rights in Cinema" section of the festival. This includes both documentaries and feature films investigating social change and individual dramas.

The FACE award consists of a sculpture in bronze (created by Freddy Ruhlman, entitled "Spirale de l'élévation") and a cash prize of 10000 €, which is offered in association with Eurimages, the Council of Europe fund for the co-production, distribution, and exhibition of European cinematographic works.

== Award holders ==
- 2017: Félicité by Alain Gomis
- 2010: Ajami by Scandar Copti and Yaron Shani.
  - Jury Special Mention went to Philippe Van Leeuw for The Day God Walked Away
  - Presented by Maud de Boer-Buquicchio, Deputy Secretary General of the Council of Europe
- 2009: Birdwatchers by Marco Bechis
  - Special Jury Prize went to Nandita Das for Firaaq
  - Presented by Maud de Boer-Buquicchio, Deputy Secretary General of the Council of Europe.
- 2008: Mang Shan / Blind Mountain by Li Yang
  - Presented by Maud de Boer-Buquicchio, Deputy Secretary General of the Council of Europe.
- 2007: Bamako / The Court by Abderrahmane Sissako
  - Presented by Thomas Hammarberg, the Council of Europe Human Rights Commissioner, in the name of the Secretary General of the Council of Europe, Terry Davis.
