= Jin Yaqin =

Chinese actress

- 金雅琴
- Born: 1925; Yimianpo Town, Shangzhi, Heilongjiang, China
- Died: 23 June 2016 (aged 91); Beijing, China
- Education: North China University; Central Academy of Drama
- Occupation: Actor
- Years active: 1952–2016
- Organization: Beijing People's Art Theatre
- Notable work: You and Me
- Spouse: Niu Xingli (1950s–2009)
- Awards: 25th Golden Rooster Award for Best Actress; 2005 You and Me; 18th Tokyo International Film Festival - Best Actress; 2005 You and Me; 7th Chinese Film Media Award for Best Actress; 2007 You and Me

Jin Yaqin (Chinese: 金雅琴; pinyin: Jīn Yǎqín; 1925 – 23 June 2016), also known by her stage name Bai Wei (Chinese: 白微; pinyin: Baí Weī), was a Chinese actress.

Jin won the 25th Golden Rooster Award for Best Actress, 18th Tokyo International Film Festival - Best Actress and 7th Chinese Film Media Award for Best Actress for her role in 2005 film You and Me.

== Life ==
Jin was born in Yimianpo Town of Shangzhi city, Heilongjiang province, during the Republic of China in 1925.

Jin worked in Home Troupe (祖国剧团) between 1943 and 1945, she appeared in The Thunderstorm and The Sunrise as Si Feng and Chen Bailu respectively, both were Cao Yu's writings.

In 1949, Jin attended North China University and she was transferred to Central Academy of Drama in 1950. After graduating in 1952 she was assigned to Beijing People's Art Theatre as an actress. During Jin worked in Beijing People's Art Theatre, she starred in many dramas, such as Zhao Xiaolan, Teahouse, Rickshaw Boy and Dragon Beard Ditch, which were written by Lao She. Jin retired in 1988.

After the reform and opening up, Jin acted in the historical film Du Shiniang, adapted from Feng Menglong's classical novel Stories to Caution the World.

In 1987, Jin played the character Zhao Momo in Dream of the Red Chamber, a historical television series starring Chen Xiaoxu, Deng Jie and Ouyang Fenqiang, based on the novel by the same name by Cao Xueqin.

Jin participated in Idler: Sister Ma (1999) and Chinese Communist Party Member: Sister Ma (2002) as Grandmother Liu, sitcoms directed by Ying Da, the former husband of Song Dandan.

In 2005, Jin played the role of grandmother in Ma Liwen's film You and Me, for which she won the Best Actress at the 25th Golden Rooster Awards, Best Actress Award at the 18th Tokyo International Film Festival and Best Actress Award at the 7th Chinese Film Media Awards.

In 2008, Jin filmed in Wheat, a historical film starring Fan Bingbing, Wang Xueqi and Wang Zhiwen.

In 2010, Jin was employed as the choreographer of the film The Flowers of War by Zhang Yimou.

Jin died on 23 June 2016.

== Personal life ==
Jin met and married Niu Xingli (牛星丽; 牛星麗; Niú Xīnglì); January 1928–December 31, 2009) in 1950s, he was also an actor from Beijing People's Art Theatre.

== Works ==
=== Film ===
Year	English title	Chinese title	Role	Notes
1981	Du Shiniang	杜十娘	Procuress	
2005	You and Me	我们俩	Grandmother	
2008	Wheat	麦田	guest	
2009	King of Eaters	大胃王	mother	
2009	Glittering Days	万家灯火	Grandmother He	

=== Television ===
Year	English title	Chinese title	Role	Notes
1987	Dream of the Red Chamber	红楼梦	Zhao Momo	
1993	I Love My Home	我爱我家	Aunt Yu	
1999	Idler: Sister Ma	闲人马大姐	Liu-Wei Yumei	
2002	Ten Years of Marriage	结婚十年	Grandmother Ye	
2002	Chinese Communist Party Member: Sister Ma	党员马大姐	Liu-Wei Yumei	
2009	The Story of Yuanyuan	圆圆的故事	Aunt Yu	
2010	Man and Wife	一日夫妻百日恩	Grandmother	

=== Drama ===
- The Thunderstorm (Chinese: 雷雨)
- The Sunrise (Chinese: 日出)
- Zhao Xiaolan (Chinese: 赵小兰)
- Teahouse (Chinese: 茶馆)
- Rickshaw Boy (Chinese: 骆驼祥子)
- Dragon Beard Ditch (Chinese: 龙须沟)

== Awards ==
Year	Work	Award	Result	Notes
2005	You and Me	25th Golden Rooster Award for Best Actress	Won	
2005	You and Me	18th Tokyo International Film Festival - Best Actress	Won	
2007	You and Me	7th Chinese Film Media Award for Best Actress	Won	
