= A Little Stiff =

- Directed by: Caveh Zahedi; Greg Watkins
- Written by: Caveh Zahedi; Greg Watkins
- Starring: Caveh Zahedi; Erin McKim
- Cinematography: Greg Watkins
- Edited by: Caveh Zahedi; Greg Watkins
- Release date: 1991
- Running time: 86 minutes
- Country: United States
- Language: English

A Little Stiff is a 1991 minimalist comedy directed by Caveh Zahedi and Greg Watkins based on true events and re-enacted by the actual participants. Caveh Zahedi plays himself as a neurotic film student who develops a crush on art student Erin McKim after a brief encounter in an elevator.

The film premiered at the Sundance Film Festival in 1991, aired on the Sundance Channel and German Television Station WDR, and was released on home video by World Artists.

The film was issued on DVD in 2015 as part of a box set of Zahedi's collected works called Digging My Own Grave: The Films of Caveh Zahedi.

== Cast ==
- Caveh Zahedi as Caveh
- Erin McKim as Erin
- Patrick Park as Patrick
- Greg Watkins as Greg
- Mike McKim as Erin's Father
