= Daughters of the Sun =

- Directed by: Mariam Shahriar
- Written by: Maryam Shahriar
- Produced by: Jahangir Kosari
- Starring: Altinay Ghelich Taghani; Soghra Karimi; Zahra Mohammadi; Habib Haddad
- Music by: Hossein Alizadeh
- Release date: 29 August 2000
- Running time: 92 minutes
- Country: Iran
- Language: Persian

Daughters of the Sun (Persian: دختران خورشید Dokhtaran-e khorshid) a 2000 Iranian drama film written and directed by Mariam Shahriar, with Altinay Ghelich Taghani and Soghra Karimi in the lead. The movie was noted for successfully depicting the hardships faced by women in the rural economic conditions of Iran.

== Synopsis ==
The film opens with the father of Amangol (Altinay Ghelich Taghani) shaving her head. He disguises her as a boy named Aman and sends her to a carpet workshop in a distant village to become an apprentice to a rug weaver and send money to the family back home. The employer, known for his harsh treatment of his employees, beats Aman for small infractions, withholds her mother's letters she receives, and keeps her locked in the workshop during evenings. Overcome with despair, Aman finds comfort and solace in one of her co-workers, Belkies (Soghra Karimi), who, thinking she is a boy, has fallen in love with her. A deep friendship blossoms between the two, but things take a turn when Belkies asks Aman to marry her before her parents marry her off to a man 30 years her senior.

== Cast ==
- Altinay Ghelich Taghani as Amangol/Aman
- Soghra Karimi as Belghies
- Zahra Mohammadi
- Habib Haddad

== Reception ==
Daughters of the Sun was met with great reviews. David Sterritt of Christian Science Monitor wrote that it is "[a]cted as a drama, paced like a ritual, filmed as a slice of rural Iranian life. Even though some critics billed it as an Iranian Boys Don't Cry and found it similar to Osama and Baran - two films released during the same time, Daughters of the Sun was a very different film. Mariam Shahriar was appreciated for developing a highly haunting and poetic mood for the movie with effective use of imageries and with minimum use of dialogues. The New York Times said of Altinay Ghelich Taghani's performance, With her shaved head and staring eyes, Aman actually looks as if she had been stripped entirely of her sexuality, like a Holocaust victim. Chicago Reader said that Taghani's passive and powerful performance as Amangol reminded them of the title character in Carl Dreyer's The Passion of Joan of Arc. Variety applauded the technical aspects of the film, especially Homayoun Payvar's cinematography that beautifully conveyed the hardships of the characters. The movie currently holds a score of 65/100 in Metacritic.

== Awards ==
- Montréal First Film Prize in Montréal World Film Festival (2000)
- ''Graine de Cinéphage Award - Special Mention in Créteil International Women's Film Festival (2001)
- Grand Jury Award for Outstanding International Narrative Feature in L.A. Outfest (2002)
- Netpac Award in Rotterdam International Film Festival (2001)
- Grand Prix Award in Bratislava International Film Festival (2001)
