= Lost and Found (2008 film) =

- Film poster
- Directed by: Ma Liwen
- Written by: Liu Zhenyun
- Produced by: Han Sanping; Wu Kebo
- Starring: Li Yixiang; Liu Xinyi; Chen Jin; Li Qiang
- Cinematography: Wu Di
- Edited by: Zhan Haihong
- Music by: Chen Yufan
- Distributed by: China Film Promotion International
- Release date: 18 January 2008
- Running time: 89 minutes
- Country: China
- Language: Mandarin

Lost and Found (simplified Chinese: 我叫刘跃进; traditional Chinese: 我叫劉躍進; pinyin: Wǒ jiào Liù Yùejìn) is a 2008 Chinese black comedy film and the third feature film directed by Ma Liwen. The film was based on the novel, I am Liu Yuejin by Liu Zhenyun and tells the story of a down-on-his-luck migrant cook who loses his life savings while in Beijing. The film is also known by the original Chinese title I am Liu Yuejin. The novel was published a mere three months before the film was released.

The film received a domestic opening in China in January 2008 before making limited appearances at various film festivals and screening events.

Lost and Found stars Li Yixiang, as the main role of Liu Yuejin though the film also boasts several cameos by Chinese filmmakers including Chen Daming (the director of Manhole) and Gao Qunshu (the director of The Tokyo Trial). It was partially produced by the state-subsidized China Film Group.

== Plot ==
Liu Yuejin (Li Yixiang), is a migrant worker from Henan eking out and existence in Beijing as a cook at a construction site. One day, he is asked by his boss, Yan (Liu Xinyi) to help concoct a fake alibi for him regarding a potential scandal with an actress. Things take a turn for the worse however, when his reward along with the rest of his money is stolen. Also stolen is an IOU for ¥60,000 owed to a man who has taken Liu's wife. When the thief ends up breaking into the home of Yan and his wife (Chen Jin), he steals a disc full of compromising material. This brings down upon Liuy private investigators, mobsters, and others. Into this mess, Liu's son and girlfriend (Zhang Zhiwei and Wang Man) come asking for money...

== Cast ==
- Li Yixiang as the titular (in the Chinese title) Liu Yuejin, a migrant cook from Henan working in Beijing.
- Liu Xinyi as Yan, a real-estate tycoon and the boss of Liu Yuejin.
- Chen Jin as Yan's wife.
- Zhang Zhiwei as Liu's son.
- Wang Man as Liu's daughter-in-law.
