= I Don't Hate Las Vegas Anymore =

- Directed by: Caveh Zahedi
- Produced by: Henry S. Rosenthal
- Starring: Caveh Zahedi; George Zahedi; Amin Zahedi
- Cinematography: Greg Watkins
- Edited by: Caveh Zahedi; Molly Fitzjarrald; Amanda Field; Thomas Logoreci
- Release date: 1994
- Running time: 70 minutes
- Country: United States
- Language: English

I Don't Hate Las Vegas Anymore is a 1994 documentary directed by Caveh Zahedi.

== Plot ==
The film follows Caveh Zahedi on a road trip to Las Vegas with his father and half-brother in an attempt to prove the existence of God. He suggests that if God exists, and if God is indeed omniscient, omnipotent and omnibenevolent, then all the filmmaker has to do is roll the camera and let God direct the movie. In an attempt "to force God's hand" and change the direction of the film, Zahedi tries to persuade his father and half-brother to take ecstasy with him. When they refuse, things quickly start to unravel.

== Release and reception ==
The film won the Critics' Award at the Rotterdam Film Festival, and was distributed on home video by World Artists. The film was issued on DVD as part of a box set of Zahedi's collected works (through 2015) called Digging My Own Grave: The Films of Caveh Zahedi.
