= Gone Is the One Who Held Me Dearest in the World =

- Film poster
- Directed by: Ma Liwen
- Written by: Ma Liwen
- Produced by: Wang Jian-Qiu; Yang Jin-Sheng; Yu Po; Song Zhenshan; Gang Tong; Lu Ying; Zheng Zhen-Xiu
- Starring: Siqin Gaowa; Shi Wei-Jian; Huang Su-ying
- Cinematography: Gao Fei
- Production companies: Beijing Forbidden City Film; Beijing Hebang Film & TV Culture Development Co., Ltd.; Beijing Kunlun Culture Communication Co., Ltd.; Beijing Film Studio
- Release date: 1 August 2002
- Running time: 95 minutes
- Country: China
- Language: Chinese

Gone Is the One Who Held Me the Dearest in the World is a 2002 Chinese drama film directed by Ma Liwen. The movie is a mature and artful drama that depicts a writer's experience caring for her aging mother, exploring themes of love, memory, and guilt through flashbacks and luminous cinematography.

== Plot ==
The story follows a middle-aged writer as she reflects on her relationship with her mother, particularly during the mother's final illness, through a series of flashbacks.

== Cast ==
- Siqin Gaowa as Aunt He
- Shi Wei-Jian as Aunt He's husband (Weijian Shi)
- Huang Suying as Aunt He's mother
- Zhang Sheng-Xian as Xiao Yue
- Jian Liu as Director Luo
- Liu Jin-Xi as Sister Yu
- Meng Qing-Guo as Director Zhao
- Beibi Gong as Gong Bei-bi
- Li Yan-Ping
- Gu Guan-Ying
- Ding Yu
- Wang Li
- Hei De-Kun

== Awards ==
Nation	Award	Year
(China)	Huabiao Award	2003
(North Korea)	Pyongyang International Film Festival	2004

== See also ==
- Chinese drama
