= You and Me (2005 film) =

- DVD cover for You and Me
- Traditional Chinese: 我們倆
- Simplified Chinese: 我们俩
- Hanyu Pinyin: Wǒmen liǎ
- Directed by: Ma Liwen
- Written by: Ma Liwen
- Produced by: Han Sanping; Jiang Tao; Lu Hongshi; Wang Daqing; Zhao Haicheng; Wu Yakang
- Starring: Jin Yaqin; Gong Zhe
- Cinematography: Wu Di; Wu Wai
- Edited by: Zhan Haihong
- Music by: Dou Wei
- Distributed by: China Film Group
- Release date: October 26, 2005 (Tokyo)
- Running time: 83 minutes
- Country: China
- Language: Mandarin

You and Me (simplified Chinese: 我们俩; traditional Chinese: 我們倆; pinyin: Wǒmen liǎ; lit. 'The Two of Us') is a 2005 Chinese film by writer-director Ma Liwen. The film, shot on a shoe-string budget, tells the story of a young woman who moves into an apartment run by a tough elderly woman. Their relationship, initially cold and hostile, soon develops into friendship over the course of four seasons. The film premiered at numerous international festivals, notably the 2005 Tokyo International Film Festival (where it picked up an award for actress Jin Yaqin) and the 2006 Berlin International Film Festival. The film was produced through the China Film Group and the Beijing Film Studio.

== Plot ==
Xiaoma is a young woman who has recently moved to Beijing where she finds an apartment in an old courtyard apartment complex owned by Grandma, an elderly woman. Xiaoma and Grandma's relationship almost immediately becomes strained. After trying to tidy up the courtyard, Grandma insists that Xiaoma turn over her share of the profits. Tightfisted, the elderly landlady resists even allowing Xiaoma to install a telephone. At the same time the older woman becomes increasingly interested in Xiaoma's personal (and romantic) life. Grandma, for example, tries to pass off her grandson to the younger woman. Annoyed, Xiaoma nevertheless is flattered at the older woman's concern. Over the course of four seasons, Xiaoma begins to learn from her landlady of the old world that the modern city of Beijing has left behind, while Grandma begins to enjoy the youth and vitality of her tenant. The two women become closer and eventually develop a deep friendship.

== Production ==
=== Story ===
The film's story is based in part on director Ma Liwen's own experiences upon moving from Jiangxi to Beijing in the 1990s. Like the protagonist, Ma also moved into an old siheyuan style apartment owned by an elderly woman. Also like the film, Ma and her landlady initially clashed, though they eventually became friends. When her landlady died, Ma was filled with remorse leading eventually to her making You and Me.

Ma Liwen said this of her film:

I used probably the most thickheaded method to shoot the four seasons. Meanwhile, the

story may be one of my own but it also has a universal theme. I aimed at showing the grandeur that arises from the trivial, instead of showing the trivial that arises from grandeur. This film was the result of my own experiences, yet it's still not so easy to

emphasize the emotional changes between two people.

=== Casting ===
The two main leads, Gong Zhe as the young woman and Jin Yaqin as Grandma, were both first-time film actresses. Gong, a photography student, was cast in the lead role after literally being "discovered" by the director outside the cafeteria at the China Central University of Fine Arts. Gong, however, has stated that the film production was strictly a one-time diversion from her stated career goals of photography.

Jin Yaqin, meanwhile, was already 81 when the shoot first began. While You and Me was her first feature film, she had a nearly sixty-year career in theater and Chinese opera behind her.

== Cast ==
- Jin Yaqin as Grandma, the landlady of a decaying Beijing courtyard building.
- Gong Zhe as Xiaoma, the young college student who moves into Grandma's building as a tenant.
- Zhang Shufang as Grandma Yin
- Luo Zhongxue as Grandson
- Qiang Shuang as Daughter
- Liu Zhengliang as Son-in-law
- Sun Jie as the Boyfriend

== Awards and nominations ==
Years	Awards	Categories	Recipients	Results	Citation(s)
2005	25th Golden Rooster Awards	Best Director	Ma Liwen	Won	
2005	25th Golden Rooster Awards	Best Actress	Jin Yaqin	Won	
2005	25th Golden Rooster Awards	Best Film		Nominated	
2005	25th Golden Rooster Awards	Best Supporting Actress	Gong Zhe	Nominated	
2005	25th Golden Rooster Awards	Best Screenplay	Ma Liwen	Nominated	
2005	18th Tokyo International Film Festival	Best Actress	Jin Yaqin (Tied with Helena Bonham Carter for Conversations with other women)	Won	
2005	18th Tokyo International Film Festival	Tokyo Grand Prix	Ma Liwen	Nominated	
2006	Beijing Student Film Festival (Jury Award)	Best Newcomer	Gong Zhe	Won	
2006	Beijing Student Film Festival (Special Jury Award)		Ma Liwen	Won	
2007	7th Chinese Film Media Award	Best Actress	Jin Yaqin	Won	
2007	7th Chinese Film Media Award	Best Supporting Actress	Gong Zhe	Won	
2007	7th Chinese Film Media Award	Best Screenplay	Ma Liwen	Nominated	
2007	Huabiao Film Awards	Outstanding Film		Nominated	
