= Matija Kluković =

Croatian film director

- Born: 4 May 1982 (age 42); Zagreb, Croatia
- Occupation: Film director

Matija Kluković (born 4 May 1982 in Zagreb, Croatia) is a Croatian independent film director. In 2006 he finished his debut feature Slow Days (Ajde, dan... prođi...) that has received much critical acclaim from Croatian film critics, won Golden Pram award at Zagreb Film Festival and internationally premiered at Rotterdam. In 2008, Slow Days placed 15th in the list of the best Croatian films since 1990, compiled by Jutarnji list.

== Filmography ==
=== As director ===
- 2006 Slow Days (Original title Ajde, dan... prođi...)
- 2009 Film Gorana Odvorčića i Matije Klukovića za Asju Jovanović i Andreu Rumenjak (Zagrebačke priče)

=== As writer ===
- 2006 Slow Days (Original title Ajde, dan... prođi...)
- 2009 Film Gorana Odvorčića i Matije Klukovića za Asju Jovanović i Andreu Rumenjak (Zagrebačke priče)
- 2009 Ciao mama

=== As actor ===
- 2006 Slow Days (Original title Ajde, dan... prođi...)
