= Wang Binyu =

Chinese murderer (1977–2005)

Wang Binyu (Chinese: 王斌余; pinyin: Wáng Bīnyú, April 30, 1977 – October 19, 2005), was a Chinese migrant worker executed for murder in 2005. His case attracted some sympathy within China and raised inequality issues.

== History ==
Born in a poor family in Gansu, Wang Binyu went to work at a factory in the neighboring Ningxia Hui Autonomous Region. These two regions are in a dry climate that is in the thinly-populated interior of China, sometimes referred to as "China's Wild West", though geographically they are north-central.

Wang Binyu needed money to pay for an operation for his father. He was working for a subcontractor, who withheld some money and claimed some was owed as expenses. While trying to force the subcontractor to pay him, Wang got into a fight with some coworkers and killed four people. Despite this, his case has attracted some sympathy within China.

In the jailhouse, Mr. Wang said that he wanted to die so that he could no longer be exploited, and expressed remorse for his murders. Wang hoped that the CPC and the country would value migrant workers. He was executed in October 2005, aged 28.
