= In the Bathtub of the World =

2001 film by Caveh Zahedi

- Directed by: Caveh Zahedi
- Cinematography: Caveh Zahedi; Amanda Field; Thomas Logoreci
- Edited by: Caveh Zahedi; Molly Fitzjarrald; Amanda Field; Thomas Logoreci
- Release date: 2001
- Running time: 73 minutes
- Country: United States
- Language: English

In the Bathtub of the World is a video diary directed by Caveh Zahedi. It covers a year in Zahedi's life. The film was released in 2001.

The director's idea was to shoot one minute each day and edit the footage down to ninety minutes.

The film aired on the Independent Film Channel, and was released on DVD by World Artists.

The film was issued on DVD in 2002 and again in 2015 as part of a box set of Zahedi's collected works called Digging My Own Grave: The Films of Caveh Zahedi.
