= Ma Liwen =

Chinese film director (born 1971)

- Born: Ma Xiaoying; 1971 (age 54–55); Jiangxi, China
- Years active: 1990s– present
- Awards: Golden Rooster Awards – Best Director; 2005 You and Me

Chinese name
- Traditional Chinese: 馬儷文
- Simplified Chinese: 马俪文
Transcriptions
Standard Mandarin
- Hanyu Pinyin: Mǎ Lìwén

Ma Liwen (born 1971) is a female Chinese film director. She has directed a handful of films during the 2000s, including 2005's You and Me, and two films in 2008, Lost and Found and Desires of the Heart.

== Biography ==
Born Ma Xiaoying in 1971 in Jiangxi province, Ma would move to Beijing in the early 1990s. She graduated from the Central Academy of Drama in 1994, and is one of Fifth Generation director Tian Zhuangzhuang's protégés along with Ning Hao. Her debut film, Gone Is the One Who Held Me Dearest in the World, was shot on a small budget.

In 2005, Ma Liwen directed You and Me, which drew on her own experiences living in a small courtyard apartment in Beijing. The film won the Ma a Golden Rooster for Best Director in 2005 and Best Actress award for actress Jin Yaqin.

== Filmography ==
Year	English Title	Chinese Title	Notes
2002	Gone Is the One Who Held Me Dearest in the World	世界上最疼我的那个人走了	Also known as She Departs from Me
2005	You and Me	我们俩	
2008	Lost and Found	我叫刘跃进	Also known as I am Liu Yuejin
2008	Desires of the Heart	桃花运	
