= Caveh Zahedi =

American film director and actor (born 1960)

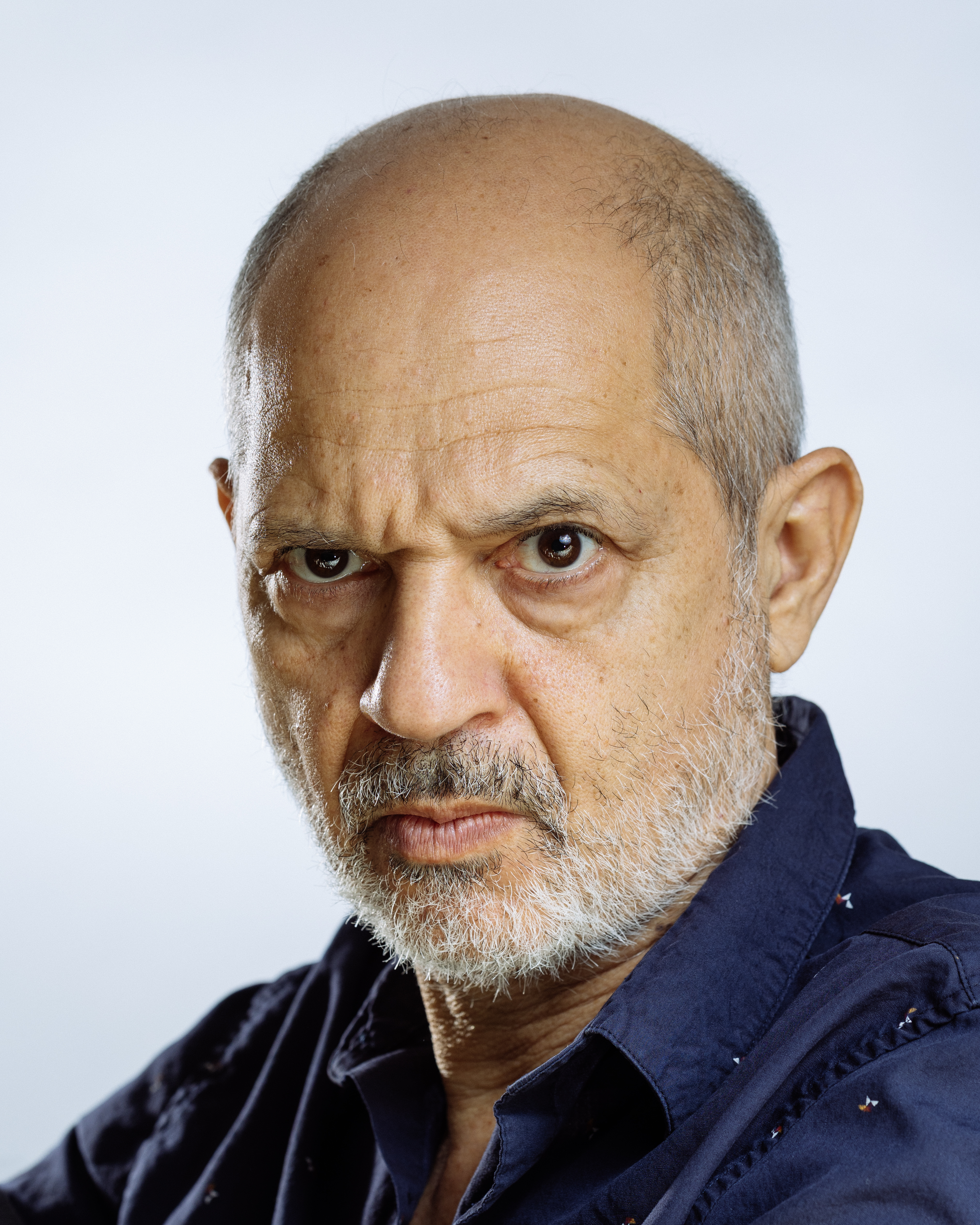
- Zahedi in 2026
- Born: 1960 (age 65–66); Washington, D.C., U.S.
- Education: UCLA School of Theater, Film and Television
- Occupations: Film director, actor, educator

Caveh Zahedi (/ˈkɑːveɪ zəˈhɛdi/; born 1960) is an American film director, actor, and educator. He teaches filmmaking at The New School in New York City.

== Early life and education ==
Zahedi was born in Washington, D.C., to Iranian immigrant parents and raised in Los Angeles. He studied philosophy at Yale University.

== Career ==
=== Los Angeles ===
Zahedi returned to Los Angeles to attend UCLA film school. There he made his first feature film, A Little Stiff (1991). The film is an experimental narrative in which he reenacts his unrequited love for a UCLA art student, using real-life participants.

His 1994 feature film I Don't Hate Las Vegas Anymore documents his attempt to bond with his estranged father and half-brother on a road trip to Las Vegas.

=== San Francisco ===
In 1998, Zahedi moved to San Francisco, where he made his next feature, In the Bathtub of the World (2001). The film was a year-long video diary, with the premise of capturing one minute of footage daily for an entire year, and editing the footage down to 90 minutes. The film premiered on the Independent Film Channel. In 2004, Zahedi released Tripping with Caveh, a 30‑minute film originally intended as a pilot episode for a television show that did not eventuate. It documents a mushroom trip with indie-folk star Will Oldham.

Starting in 2001, Zahedi taught film at the San Francisco Art Institute.

=== Recent work ===
In 2005, Caveh's film I Am a Sex Addict was released. It took 15 years to make due to financial and production difficulties. Through reenactments, the film recounts Zahedi's struggle with his addiction to prostitutes and the havoc it wreaked on his marriages and romantic relationships. When the completed project was rejected by Sundance, Zahedi tried to distribute the film himself. Only after he won the Gotham Award for "Best Film Not Playing in a Theater Near You" did IFC Films pick up the film. Zahedi has since made several short films, including "Dada", published by Focus Features, and "The Unmaking of I Am a Sex Addict", released on the DVD magazine Wholphin.

Caveh's film The Sheik and I, released in 2012, is a feature-length version of a shorter film commissioned by the Sharjah Biennial. It was banned in Sharjah.

In 2015, the Factory 25 label released an anthology 6-DVD box set, Digging My Own Grave: The Films of Caveh Zahedi, that collects all of Zahedi's works to date.

In 2016, Zahedi began working on a television series for BRIC TV called The Show About The Show. It is a show about its own making, with each episode detailing the making of the previous episode.

Zahedi teaches filmmaking at The New School in New York City.

== Awards ==
- 1997: Guggenheim Fellowship
- 2005: Gotham Awards "Best Film Not Playing in a Theater Near You"
- 2008: Rome Prize
