= Blind Shaft =

- Film poster
- Directed by: Li Yang
- Screenplay by: Li Yang
- Based on: Shen Mu by Liu Qingbang
- Produced by: Li Yang
- Starring: Li Yixiang; Wang Shuangbao; Wang Baoqiang
- Cinematography: Liu Yonghong
- Edited by: Li Yang; Karl Riedl
- Music by: Zhang Yadong
- Distributed by: United States: Kino International
- Release dates: 12 February 2003 (Berlin); 7 November 2003 (United Kingdom); 4 February 2004 (United States)
- Running time: 92 minutes
- Language: Henanese

Blind Shaft (Chinese: 盲井; pinyin: Mángjǐng) is a 2003 film about a pair of brutal con artists operating in the illegal coal mines of present-day northern China. The film was written and directed by Li Yang (李杨), and is based on Chinese writer Liu Qingbang's short novel Shen Mu (Sacred Wood).

== Plot ==
Most coal mines in China are worked by migrant workers who are forced to endure back-breaking, dangerous work in order to send money home. Some of them have additional schemes of their own.

Song Jinming (played by Li Yixiang) and Tang Zhaoyang (Wang Shuangbao) are professional con artists, running an intricate scam they have perfected through repeated practice. They find a naive young man looking for work, and convince him that they have arranged three lucrative coal mining jobs for themselves and a relative. The relative has not arrived in time, leaving a gap which they generously offer to the future victim, on the condition that he pretend to be the missing relative. After a few days of working in the mine, they murder the victim, and by making the murder look like an accident, they use his death to extort compensation money from the mine's management.

After introducing the scam, the film follows the pair as they repeat it on a new victim, sixteen-year-old Yuan Fengming (played by Wang Baoqiang). Tensions arise as Song begins to have reservations, touched by the victim's youth and innocence and the uncanny resemblance of Yuan's father to their first victim of the film, while Tang remains focused on making money for himself and his own family.

== Production history ==
Most of the filming took place 700 meters underground on the border between the Hebei and Shanxi provinces of northern China. Li and his crew were harassed and threatened during the filming.

== Reception ==
Blind Shaft has won at least twelve awards, including a Silver Bear for Outstanding Artistic Contribution at 53rd Berlin International Film Festival in 2003.

=== Ban in China ===
Blind Shaft has not been approved for release in China. The Economist noted how "directors are eager to comment on the rapid changes in Chinese society. But films such as Li Yang's Blind Shaft (a bleak, compelling picture about life in China's illegal coal mines)... were not shown to local audiences even though they had been acclaimed abroad."

The director has stated that although he is not sure exactly why the film was banned in China, he believes the film's content has "no political stigma" attached to it, noting that the novel received China's highest literary award, the Lao She Literary Prize.

Discussing the film's themes, Li emphasizes the universal, humane elements:

Economic disparity is a common problem of all humanity. Man’s desire for money and other attractions is boundless and this is how he loses his humanity. My film is set in China but the story could have occurred in Germany, the US or in Australia. I made it in China simply because I am Chinese and familiar with the country. The basic theme is universal.

== See also ==
- Wang Binyu (a Chinese migrant worker)
- Chinese New Left
- Labor relations in China
