= The Call of Cthulhu (film) =

- Theatrical release poster
- Directed by: Andrew Leman
- Screenplay by: Sean Branney
- Based on: "The Call of Cthulhu" by H. P. Lovecraft
- Produced by: Sean Branney; Andrew Leman
- Starring: John Bolen; Ralph Lucas; Chad Fifer; John Klemantaski; Jason Owens; D. Grigsby Poland; David Mersault
- Narrated by: Matt Foyer
- Cinematography: David Robertson
- Edited by: David Robertson
- Music by: Troy Sterling Nies; Ben Holbrook; Nicholas Pavkovic; Chad Fifer
- Distributed by: H. P. Lovecraft Historical Society
- Release date: June 6, 2005
- Running time: 47 minutes
- Country: United States
- Language: English

The Call of Cthulhu is a 2005 independent silent horror film adaptation of H. P. Lovecraft's short story of the same name, produced by Sean Branney and Andrew Leman and distributed by the H. P. Lovecraft Historical Society. It is the first film adaptation of the famous Lovecraft story, and uses Mythoscope, a blend of vintage and modern filming techniques intended to produce the look of a 1920s-era film. The film is the length of a featurette.

The original story had long been considered unfilmable, but the concept of making it a silent film and the enthusiasm that the creators had for their project earned it good reviews and several awards.

== Production ==
For the first fourteen months of shooting the film, Sean Branney kept an online journal, which talks about some of the struggles they had to deal with during shooting and information on how Cthulhu was created for this film. He discusses how miserably hot it was to shoot the movie during the summer. He also talks about shooting on the beaches of Los Angeles where innovative lighting was used to create different scenes at the same place. For some of the action shots in the film, the camera was put in the ocean for better effects. Additionally, the swamp used in the film was a miniature set built at a 1/24th scale and took six weeks to build.

The filmmakers used a puppet for the Cthulhu monster, the skeleton had almost one hundred points of articulation, not counting the tentacles which were all made of wire. The head, hands, and wings were made of latex while the rest of Cthulhu's body was made of fabric. The gills made of silicone and cast in latex and the eyes were two battery powered light bulbs. The light bulbs for eyes helped with the animation of the puppet since the scenes consisted of such dark lighting.

== Plot ==
The film begins with a dying professor who leaves his great-nephew a collection of documents pertaining to the Cthulhu Cult. The nephew (Matt Foyer) begins to learn why the study of the cult so fascinated his great-uncle. Bit-by-bit he begins piecing together the dread implications of his great-uncle's inquiries, and soon he takes on investigating the Cthulhu cult as a crusade of his own. Sailors aboard the Emma encounter the Alert abandoned at sea. The nephew notes that Inspector Legrasse, who had directed the raid on cultists in backwoods Louisiana, died before the nephew's investigation began. As he pieces together the dreadful and disturbing reality of the situation, his own sanity begins to crumble. In the end, he passes the torch to his psychiatrist, who in turn hears Cthulhu's call.

== Cast ==
- Matt Foyer as Francis Wayland Thurston
- John Bolen as The Listener
- Ralph Lucas as Professor Angell
- Chad Fifer as Henry Wilcox
- David Mersault as Inspector Legrasse
- Barry Lynch as Professor Webb

== Release ==
The Call of Cthulhu was selected to appear at numerous film festivals, including the 2006 Slamdance Film Festival and North America's largest, the 2006 Seattle International Film Festival, where it sold out both screenings thanks in part to a glowing review from The Stranger, a local paper.

== Reception ==
Despite the long-standing conventional wisdom that the story was inherently "unfilmable", The Call of Cthulhu garnered mostly positive reception from critics. It holds 100% approval rating on Rotten Tomatoes with an average rating of 7.1/10 based on 6 reviews.

Dennis Schwartz from Ozus' World Movie Reviews rated the film a grade B, writing, "[a] haunting labor of love tribute", praising the film's style, and score. Paul di Filippo of Science Fiction Weekly called it "the best HPL adaptation to date", labeling the decision to adapt it as a silent film "a brilliant conceit". Daniel Siwek from DVD Talk gave the film 4.5 out of 5 stars, calling it "very eerie and enjoyable", and "A true testament to what can be accomplished with a lot of work and passion, but with limited funds." DW Bostaph Jr from Dread Central awarded the film a score of 4/5, writing, "Ambitious in its own right, The Call of Cthulhu is indeed a step forward for the world of H. P. Lovecraft cinema. It is one of a handful of new films made by fans of the late great authors work, who not only see the prospect in the mines, but are able to understand the rock they are hidden within". David Cornelius from eFilmCritic gave the film 4 out of 5 stars, praising the film's soundtrack, writing, "What's truly great about Cthulhu is that it not only sets out to impress the hardcore Lovecraft fanatic, but fans of classic and/or experimental independent film as well. While it stumbles in places, both in terms of storytelling and presentation of its gimmick, it's such a unique project, and the love for the project by all involved is so contagious, that it becomes one of those special hidden secrets that you can't wait to introduce to your friends."

In their book Lurker in the Lobby: The Guide to the Cinema of H. P. Lovecraft, Andrew Migliore and John Strysik write: "The Call of Cthulhu is a landmark adaptation that calls out to all Lovecraftian film fanatics—from its silent film form, its excellent cast, its direction, and its wonderful musical score... this is Cthulhuian cinema that Howard would have loved."

== History ==
Lovecraft's story of Cthulhu impacted the 20th century's culture. He inspired bands, video games, and even comics. He also influenced politics with things such as parody campaigns. With his story Lovecraft creates cross-references, he uses real places while also combining them fictional places. In doing so he is blurring the lines between what is reality and what is fiction.

After Lovecraft's death, The Cthulhu Mythos was created. Which is a collection of stories by Lovecraft and suggested that it was his works that created the concept. Although his understanding of what he created was different, he never intended for to take the mythology of Cthulhu seriously. The Cthulhu Mythos has a massive impact on contemporary popular culture.

Lovecraft's short story has some elements of modern occultism. The use of human sacrifice and Anthony Wilcox's (a character in the story) figurine of Cthulhu without having any knowledge of the creature is an example of occultism in the story. The portrayals of cultists in the story were well-respected by the public. In the story, the Cthulhu cult is secretive they are this way due to their harmful intention to resurrect the creature which involves human sacrifice. The story influenced modern occultism beliefs due to its elements and traditional occultism values.

=== Awards ===
The Call of Cthulhu received various awards, including:

- Best Feature at Eerie Horror Film Festival (2006)
- Prix Tournage for the Best American Movie at 23rd Avignon Film Festival (2006)
- Audience Choice at Another Hole in the Head (2006)
- Vuze Audience Favorites Winner (2007/2008)
