= Gregory H. Watkins =

American sound engineer

- Occupation: Sound engineer
- Years active: 1982 – present

Gregory H. Watkins is an American sound engineer. He won an Academy Award for Best Sound and has been nominated for two more in the same category. He has worked on over 150 films since 1982.

== Selected filmography ==
Watkins won an Academy Award for Best Sound and has been nominated for another two:

Won

- Dances with Wolves (1990)

Nominated

- Born on the Fourth of July (1989)
- Crimson Tide (1995)
