= H. P. Lovecraft Historical Society =

Historical society

The H. P. Lovecraft Historical Society or HPLHS is the organization that hosts Cthulhu Lives!, a group of live-action roleplayers for the Cthulhu Live version of Call of Cthulhu. Founded in Colorado in 1984, it is now based in Glendale, California. Their motto is Ludo Fore Putavimus ("We thought it would be fun").

HPLHS produces a number of Cthulhu Mythos films, including the eponymous The Call of Cthulhu (horror film adaptation of H. P. Lovecraft's short story of the same name), as well as sound recordings, under its Mythoscope and Mythophone labels, respectively. They also offer props, both for sale and for free download.

Originally a hobbyist group, HPLHS has become a for-profit company dedicated to creating content faithful to the spirit of the Gothic 1920s source material but leavening it with some humour.

The HPLHS is the world's largest organization of Lovecraft enthusiasts, with members in more than fifty countries.

== Productions ==
=== Printed work ===
- Strange Eons** (1986-1990)
- The Spirit of Revision - Lovecraft's Letters to Zealia Brown Reed Bishop (2015)
- Miskatonic Missives
- A Shoggoth on the Roof Libretto (2005)
- Miskatonic University Monographs
  - Archeological Interpretations of Myth Patterns in the Iconography of the Codex Beltrán-Escavy
  - The Curious Sea Shanty Variants of Innsmouth, Mass.
  - The Discovery of Fragments of Kitab Al-Azif at Harran

=== Audio ===
The H.P. Lovecraft Historical Society has created music based on the writings of HP Lovecraft.

- A Shoggoth on the Roof (2005)
- A Very Scary Solstice (2003)
  - "Carol of the Old Ones"
- An Even Scarier Solstice (2006)
- Live at the Gilman House (2011)
- Dreams in the Witch House: A Lovecraftian Rock Opera (2013)
- The Curious Sea Shanties of Innsmouth Massachusetts (2016)

==== Dark Adventure Radio Theatre ====
The H.P. Lovecraft Historical Society has produced a series of Mercury Theatre-style radio dramas entitled "Dark Adventure Radio Theatre".

Currently produced episodes:

- Dark Adventure Radio Theatre: At the Mountains of Madness (2006)
- Dark Adventure Radio Theatre: The Dunwich Horror (2008)
- Dark Adventure Radio Theatre: The Shadow Out of Time (2008)
- Dark Adventure Radio Theatre: The Shadow Over Innsmouth (2008)
- Dark Adventure Radio Theatre: The Call of Cthulhu (2012)
- Dark Adventure Radio Theatre: The Case of Charles Dexter Ward (2013)
- Dark Adventure Radio Theatre: The Colour Out of Space (2013)
- Dark Adventure Radio Theatre: Herbert West - Reanimator (2013)
- Dark Adventure Radio Theatre: The Dreams in the Witch House (2014)
- Dark Adventure Radio Theatre: Imprisoned with the Pharaohs (2014)
- Dark Adventure Radio Theatre: The Horror at Red Hook (2015)
- Dark Adventure Radio Theatre: Dagon - War of Worlds (2015)
- Dark Adventure Radio Theatre: A Solstice Carol (2015)
- Dark Adventure Radio Theatre: The White Tree (2016)
- Dark Adventure Radio Theatre: The Thing on the Doorstep (2016)
- Dark Adventure Radio Theatre: The Brotherhood of the Beast (2016)
- Dark Adventure Radio Theatre: The Haunter of the Dark (2017)
- Dark Adventure Radio Theatre: The Rats in the Walls (2018)
- Dark Adventure Radio Theatre: Bad Medicine (2018)
- Dark Adventure Radio Theatre: Masks of Nyarlathotep (2018)
- Dark Adventure Radio Theatre: The Lurking Fear (2019)
- Dark Adventure Radio Theatre: Mad Science (2019)
- Dark Adventure Radio Theatre: The Whisperer in Darkness (2020)
- Dark Adventure Radio Theatre: The Curse of Yig (2020)
- Dark Adventure Radio Theatre: The Horror in the Museum (2021)
- Dark Adventure Radio Theatre: The Black Stone (2023)
- Dark Adventure Radio Theatre: The Shunned House (2023)
- Dark Adventure Radio Theatre: The Temple of Jupiter Ammon (2023)
- Dark Adventure Radio Theatre: The Iron Maiden (2024)
- Dark Adventure Radio Theatre: The Temple (2025)
- Dark Adventure Radio Theatre: Purgatory Chasm (2025)
- Dark Adventure Radio Theatre: Blood Red Sphinx (2026)

=== Film ===
- The Testimony of Randolph Carter
- A Shoggoth on the Roof - a short mockumentary film about a failed attempt to stage a musical that set the works of Lovecraft to the music of Fiddler on the Roof (2001).
- The Call of Cthulhu (2005) – Directed by Andrew Leman and described by one reviewer as the most successful adaptation of this story, this silent movie was filmed in black and white. It was created over the course of two years on a very small budget. The DVD version allowed the viewer to watch the movie with the intertitle cards translated into any one of 24 languages.
- The Whisperer in Darkness (2011) – Some filming for this production was undertaken at Mount Holyoke College in Massachusetts.

== See also ==
- H. P. Lovecraft
