= Slow Days =

Slow Days (Ajde, dan... prođi...)
- Directed by: Matija Kluković
- Written by: Matija Kluković
- Produced by: Irena Marković
- Starring: Višnja Pešić; Filip Šuster; Marija Kohn; Petra Težak; Nina Benović
- Cinematography: Bojana Burnać
- Music by: Darko Marković; Blamaž Electroniq
- Release date: 2006
- Running time: 102 minutes
- Country: Croatia
- Language: Croatian
- Budget: 250,000 HRK

Slow Days (Croatian: Ajde, dan... prođi...) is a 2006 black and white Croatian indie film. Set in the Croatian capital Zagreb and its satellite town, Velika Gorica, it follows the lives of over twenty individuals. It was directed, written, and edited over a period of three years by the young Matija Kluković and starred, among others, Višnja Pešić, Filip Šuster, Marija Kohn, Petra Težak, and Nina Benović.

In Croatia, the film received critical acclaim for its independent style of film-making, terrific cast of non-actors combined with professional actors, and black and white cinematography by Bojana Burnać, the first female cinematographer in Croatian film history. It won the Golden Pram award at Zagreb Film Festival and internationally premiered at the International Film Festival Rotterdam in 2007.
