= After the Apocalypse =

2004 film directed by Yasuaki Nakajima

- Directed by: Yasuaki Nakajima
- Written by: Yasuaki Nakajima
- Starring: Jacqueline Bowman, Velina Georgi, Zorikh Lequidre, Oscar Lowe, Moises Morales, Yasuaki Nakajima
- Cinematography: Carolyn Macartney
- Edited by: Yasuaki Nakajima
- Music by: Hiro Ota
- Release date: 2004
- Running time: 72 minutes
- Language: N/A

After the Apocalypse is a 2004 science fiction black-and-white film about five survivors after World War III. A single woman and four men are forced to communicate without words because of destructive gasses from the war. They are forced to recreate their lives both individually and collectively. The film does not have any dialogue.

== Production ==
The film was filmed in Brooklyn and Queens, New York.

== Reception ==
On the film review aggregation website Rotten Tomatoes, After the Apocalypse received a 90% approval rating, based on 9 reviews, with an average rating of 6.8/10. On the website Metacritic, the film has received a score of 53 out of 100 based on 6 reviews.

== See also ==
- Apocalyptic and post-apocalyptic fiction
