= Zombie! vs. Mardi Gras =

- Directed by: Mike Lyddon; Will Frank; Karl DeMolay
- Written by: Mike Lyddon; Will Frank; Karl DeMolay
- Produced by: Mike Lyddon; Will Frank; Karl DeMolay
- Starring: Dale Ashmun; Loreli Fuller; John Sinclair; Jeanette Hauser; Veronica Russell
- Production company: Carnivale Productions
- Release date: 1999
- Running time: 75 minutes
- Country: United States
- Language: English
- Budget: $5,000

Zombie! vs. Mardi Gras is a 1999 independently produced comedy horror film directed by Karl DeMolay, Will Frank, and Mike Lyddon. It stars Dale Ashmun, Loreli Fuller, John Sinclair, Jeanette Hauser, and Veronica Russell.

In the film, an unnamed Sumerian goddess empowers an occultist with the ability to raise zombies from the grave. The occultist starts a killing spree in New Orleans during Mardi Gras. But Galileo Galilei gets resurrected and attempts to save the city.

== Synopsis ==
The opening scenes of the film center on MacGuffin, a deranged occultist whose life has been dedicated to vengeance after being trampled and rendered a paraplegic as a child by overzealous Mardi Gras revelers in the throes of bead-catching madness.

With the help of a Sumerian Goddess, MacGuffin performs a ritual that raises Zombie! (exclamation point mandatory) from his grave. Zombie! embarks on a killing spree in New Orleans during the Mardi Gras festivities. A trio of filmmakers get word of this and hasten to capture Zombie! on film.

Renaissance genius Galileo, newly pardoned by Pope John Paul II and thus released from Purgatory, also chases Zombie! through New Orleans' crowded streets. Meanwhile, a zaftig ninja vows to take down the undead menace.

The film is peppered with comedy sketches and sight gags more or less unrelated to the plot, including numerous shots of bare-breasted women flashing the Mardi Gras crowds.

== Cast ==
- Dale Ashmun
- Lorelei Fuller
- John Sinclair
- Jeanette Hauser
- Veronica Russell

== Release ==
Zombie! vs. Mardi Gras was originally direct-to-video. It received a theatrical release in New York in April 2001. The film mainly played in non-theatrical venues after its initial release.

The film was re-mastered, with noticeable improvements to sound quality, and released on DVD in February 2006 by the filmmakers.

== Reception ==
The film was negatively reviewed by many online sites, which called it "the worst film ever made," but it had a positive reception at the New York Underground Film Festival. Rotten Tomatoes, a review aggregator, reports that 20% of ten surveyed critics gave the film a positive review; the average rating is 2.5/10. Metacritic rated it 12/100 based on five reviews. James Berardinelli proclaimed it "the worst professionally produced film I have had the displeasure of sitting through." Berardinelli goes on to mention that "after enduring 'Zombie! Vs. Mardi Gras,' you will have a clear appreciation of which films are truly bad and which ones are just unimaginative and lifeless." David Sterritt of The Christian Science Monitor wrote, "Fans of unregenerate underground moviemaking will have a ball, and there's a creepy charm to the picture's proudly homemade quality." Lawrence Van Gelder of The New York Times called it "amateurish and incoherent." Brian Bertoldo of Film Threat rated it 3/5 stars and wrote, "There’s not much of a plot here, just sheer absurdity. In a way the film is amusing for what it is, once I figured that out." Maitland McDonagh of TV Guide called it a parody of horror comedy films that has pre-fabricated cult appeal. Writing in The Zombie Movie Encyclopedia, academic Peter Dendle called it "a postmodern Art Zombie movie" that is "little more than an excuse for a bunch of film school students to hit New Orleans."
