= Mariam Shahriar =

Iranian film director and scriptwriter

- مریم شهریار

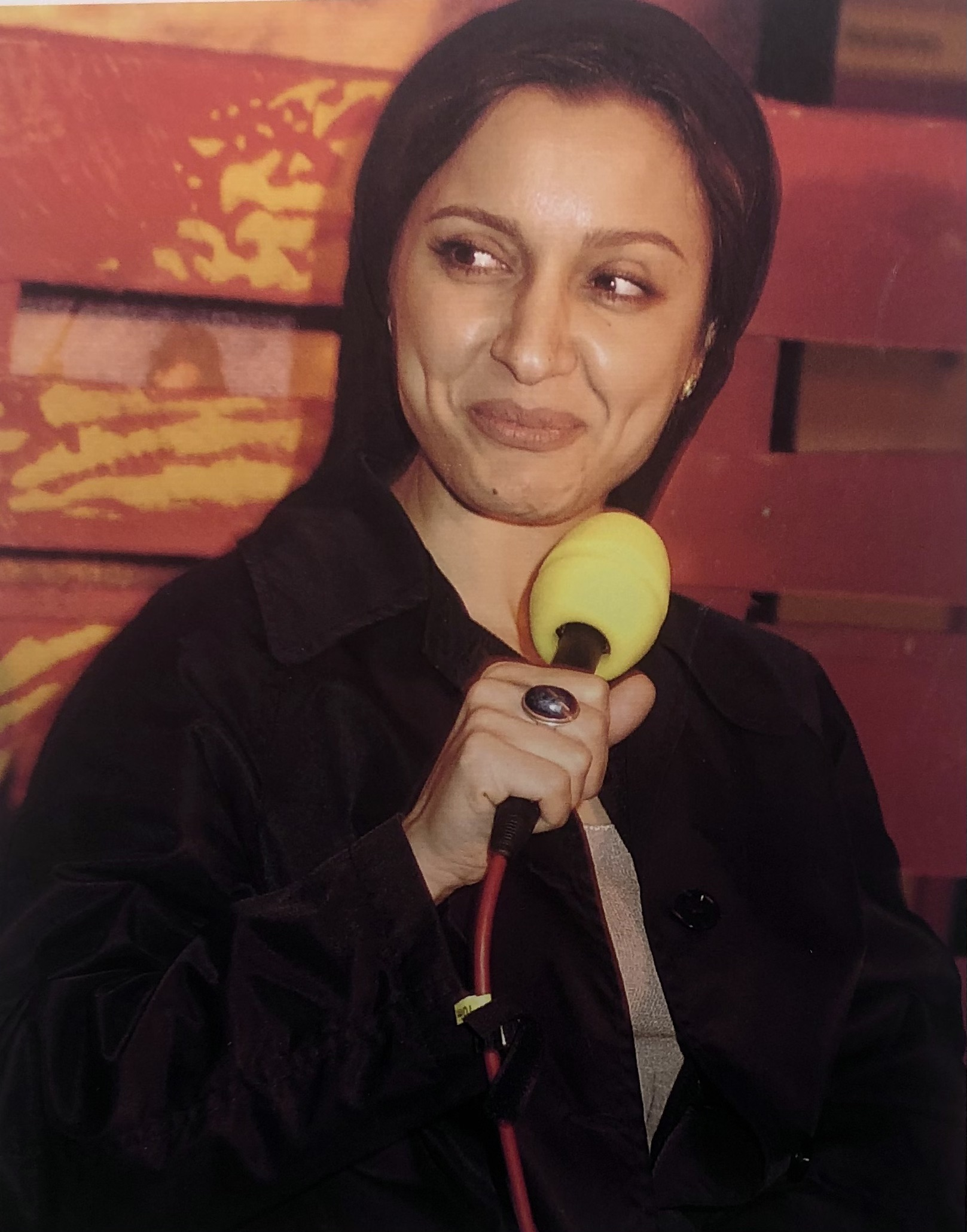

Mariam Shahriar is an American/Iranian film director and scriptwriter who achieved critical acclaim with her first feature film Daughters of the Sun.

== Biography ==
Shahriar was born in Tehran, Iran. Originally intending to study architecture in Italy, she instead travelled to the United States during the Iran–Iraq War. She studied cinema at California State University, Northridge after watching Fellini's 8½. After graduating, she moved to Rome, Italy and continued studying for her MFA at American University. She worked in the Italian film industry as assistant director and editor.

She returned to Iran when her mother became gravely ill. There she was encouraged by famed Iranian director Abbas Kiarostami to write a story for a film project and apply to become a member of the Directors Guild. The first script could not be filmed in time so she came up with the concept for her first feature film Daughters of the Sun.

Daughters of the Sun, marks Mariam Shahriar's debut feature film. The story centers around Aman, a rural girl whose father, in a desperate bid to make ends meet, shaves her head and disguises her as a boy, sending her to toil in a rug-making workshop. In this workshop, she crosses paths with a female colleague who mistakenly believes Aman is a boy. This colleague soon finds herself falling in love with Aman and proposes they run away together to avoid being forcibly married off to a significantly older man. Aman now faces a critical decision, with little time to save either herself or her friend from the grim fate that looms.

Daughters of the Sun won several major festival awards including Best Film at Montreal International Film Festival and Best Film at Bratislava International Film Festival. David Sterritt wrote that it is "[a]cted as a drama, paced like a ritual, filmed as a slice of rural Iranian life." Sheri Whatley regarded the film as a courageous political act: "This portray of a woman with not only her head uncovered, but shaved is quite a brazen act for a director."

== Filmography ==
- All My Dreams Come True (1986, short)
- In Search of a Lost Dream (1986, short)
- Mommy, Don't Cry (1987, short)
- Lost Love (1990, short)
- Angelica é una brava ragazza (1997, short)
- Dokhtaran Khorshid / Daughters of the Sun
