= Li Yang (director) =

Chinese writer-director (born 1959)

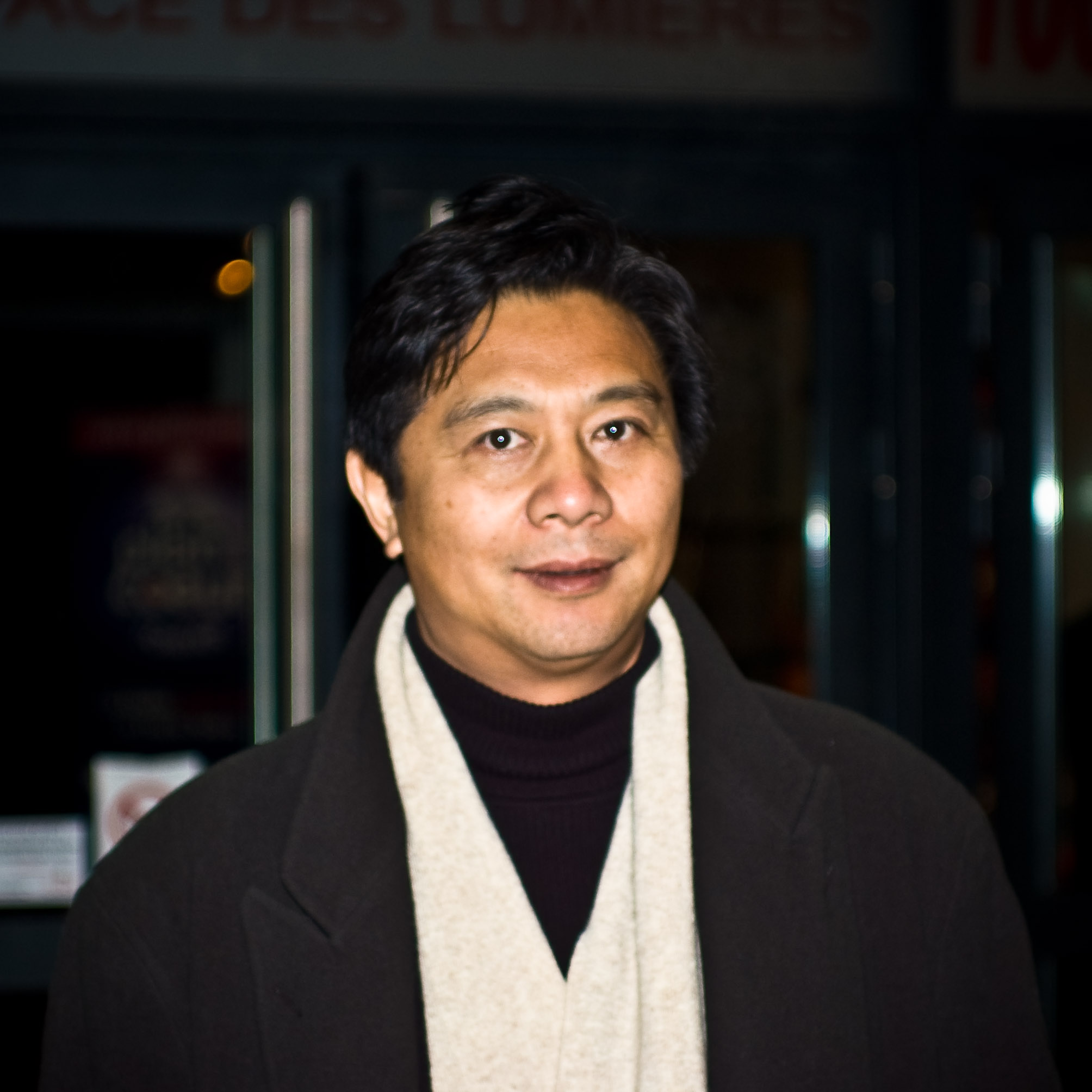
- Born: 1959 (age 66–67); Xi'an, Shaanxi, China
- Occupations: Film director, Screenwriter
- Years active: 1990s-present
- Awards: Silver Berlin Bear - Outstanding Artistic Achievement; 2003 Blind Shaft; Deauville Golden Lotus; 2003 Blind Shaft; Hong Kong Silver Firebird; 2003 Blind Shaft; Bratislava Grand Prix; 2007 Blind MountainGolden Horse Awards – Best Adapted Screenplay; 2003 Blind Shaft

Chinese name
- Traditional Chinese: 李楊
- Simplified Chinese: 李杨
Transcriptions
Standard Mandarin
- Hanyu Pinyin: Lǐ Yáng

Li Yang (simplified Chinese: 李杨; traditional Chinese: 李楊; pinyin: Lǐ Yáng; born 1959) is a Chinese writer-director. Though often grouped with the so-called Sixth Generation of Chinese filmmakers, he is in fact closer in age to the Fifth Generation and in interviews has denied membership with either group, claiming that such labels are only artificial differentiations.

Born in Xi'an, China in 1959, Li studied at the Beijing Broadcasting Institute from 1985 to 1987, after which he moved to Germany. There he made several documentary films and spent some time acting on German television before eventually enrolling and graduating from the Academy of Media Arts in Cologne in 1995.

== Directing career ==
Upon his return to China, Li made his first non-documentary film, the critically acclaimed Blind Shaft (2003). The film's bleak story of two murderous con-men plying their trade in China's dangerous mines proved a major success in the international film festival circuit. Critics particularly noted how Li’s background in documentaries showed through in the film's Cinéma vérité and Italian neorealist style, in particular Li's use of handheld cameras and an ambient sound soundtrack. In China, however, the film’s critical eye toward the notoriously dangerous mining industry proved controversial and Blind Shaft was banned by the Beijing Film Bureau. However, neither the precise reasoning nor the length of the ban was made known to Li.

After his ban, Li Yang split his time between Hong Kong and Germany and gave at least one interview where he claimed,

I don't think I have a future in China. They don't have a very good impression of me there.

Despite his worries, the ban was eventually lifted and Li was allowed to begin work on his follow up to Blind Shaft. Entitled Blind Mountain (2007), it debuted at the 2007 Cannes Film Festival in the Prix un certain regard competition and was one of only three Asian films vying for an award at the prestigious event. Like Li's previous film, Blind Mountain turns a sharply critical eye towards another one of China's continuing social problems, this time the illegal selling of women for marriage. Blind Mountain also shares the same realistic style as Blind Shaft as seen in the latter film's cast of mostly non-professional actors and its use of diegetic music.

== Awards and nominations ==
- Berlin International Film Festival, 2003
  - Silver Bear for Outstanding Artistic Achievement – Blind Shaft (as screenwriter and director)
- Golden Horse Awards, 2003
  - Best Screenplay Adapted from Another Source – Blind Shaft
- Tribeca Film Festival, 2003
  - Best Narrative Feature – Blind Shaft
- Edinburgh International Film Festival, 2003
  - New Director's Award - Blind Shaft
- Hawaii International Film Festival, 2003
  - Best Film - Blind Shaft
- Hong Kong International Film Festival, 2003
  - Silver Firebird - Blind Shaft
- International Film Festival Bratislava, 2007
  - Grand Prix - Blind Mountain
  - Special Mention of the Ecumenical Jury - Blind Mountain

== Filmography ==
| Year | English Title | Chinese Title | Pinyin | Notes |
|---|---|---|---|---|
| 2003 | Blind Shaft | 盲井 | Máng jǐng | Silver Bear for Outstanding Artistic Achievement at the 2003 Berlin International Film Festival |
| 2007 | Blind Mountain | 盲山 | Máng shān | |
| 2018 | Blind Way | 盲道 | Máng dao | Planned conclusion to an informal trilogy |
