= The Whisperer in Darkness (film) =

- Film poster
- Directed by: Sean Branney
- Written by: Sean Branney; Andrew Leman
- Based on: The Whisperer in Darkness by H.P. Lovecraft
- Produced by: Sean Branney; Andrew Leman; David Robertson
- Edited by: David Robertson
- Music by: Troy Sterling Nies
- Distributed by: H. P. Lovecraft Historical Society
- Release dates: March 12, 2011 (Athens Film Festival); May 19, 2011 (United States)
- Running time: 104 minutes
- Country: United States
- Language: English

The Whisperer in Darkness is a 2011 independent horror film directed and produced by Sean Branney, Andrew Leman, and David Robertson and distributed by the H.P. Lovecraft Historical Society. Based on the H. P. Lovecraft short story of the same name, it was shot using Mythoscope, a blend of vintage and modern filming techniques intended to produce the look of a 1930s-era film. According to the film's website, the filmmakers intended to capture the look of "classic horror films of the 1930s like Dracula, Frankenstein and King Kong".

== Plot ==
For the first two acts, the plot largely follows the short story, which begins with the Great Vermont Flood of 1927. The third act consists of entirely new material in which the Mi-Go are revealed to worship Shub-Niggurath, and the protagonist, Wilmarth, uncovers an attempt by cultists to open a gateway between Yuggoth (Pluto) and Earth. He foils the plot with the help of Hannah, the child of one of the collaborators. His escape is unsuccessful and at the end of the film the audience discovers that Wilmarth has been narrating from a machine attached to the cylinder in which his brain now resides. This differs from the original story in which Wilmarth flees in the middle of the night and safely returns to Arkham.

According to Sean Branney on the making-of featurette "The Whisperer Behind the Scenes," Lovecraft was better at set-ups than endings. From a dramatic standpoint, Lovecraft's story brought the writers through what would be "Act Two" of a standard movie structure and felt incomplete. The character of Hannah and opening of gate to Yuggoth were introduced in order to "[make it] a good movie". Branney and Leman intended to make Wilmarth's world "more emotionally complicated" because Hannah's future caused him to be "invested in more than just himself". The characters of Wilmarth's three friends at Miskatonic University were developed from Call of Cthulhu role-playing characters created years before by Branney, Leman, and a friend. Regarding the introduction of a biplane, Leman commented, "If you have monsters that fly, you have to have a dogfight with a biplane."

== Cast ==
In order of appearance:

- Paul Ita as Farmer
- Matt Foyer as Albert Wilmarth
- Matt Lagan as Nathaniel Ward
- Lance J. Holt as Davis Bradbury
- Andrew Leman as Charles Fort
- Stephen Blackehart as Charlie Tower
- David Pavao as Jordan Lowell
- Don Martin as Dean Hayes
- Joe Sofranko as George Akeley
- Barry Lynch as Henry Akeley
- Martin Wately as Walter Brown
- Daniel Kaemon as P.F. Noyes
- Caspar Marsh as Will Masterson
- Autumn Wendel as Hannah Masterson
- Sean Branney as B-67
- Annie Abrams as Aviatrix
- Zack Gold as Astronomer
- John Jabaley as Superintendent

== Production ==
The filmmakers used Mount Holyoke College to represent Miskatonic University. Pasadena City College is used for interior scenes of the school.

Sandy Petersen, author of the Call of Cthulhu role-playing game, contributed financially to the film in order to finish its production.

== Release ==
The Whisperer in Darkness did not have a theatrical release but appeared at dozens of film festivals in over a dozen countries. It was then released on DVD and Blu-ray in early 2012.

== Reception ==
The Whisperer in Darkness received highly positive reviews. It holds 86% approval rating on Rotten Tomatoes. On the Internet Movie Database it has 6.6 out of 10 stars. John J. Puccio of Movie Metropolis said "The atmospherics are in place, and the filmmakers catch the essence of Lovecraft's expansive horror with efficiency. The film is entertaining without attaining greatness." Andrew O'Hehir of Salon.com said "'Whisperer in Darkness' has a chiller-diller conclusion and some moments of real terror."

== Awards ==
The Whisperer in Darkness was nominated at Oaxaca Film Fest.

- Gold Hugo—Nominated
- Free Spirit Award—Nominated
