= The Red Dwarf (film) =

1998 film by Yvan Le Moine

The Red Dwarf is a Belgian comedy drama directed by Yvan Le Moine released in 1998. It is based on Le nain rouge, a story by Michel Tournier.

== Synopsis ==
Lucien L'Hotte, a dwarf becomes enamoured and begins an affair with the singer Paola Bendoni. Lucien excuses himself from her company and, in a dramatic scene, indulges in her luxurious bathtub and emerges and boldly pursues an affair with the singer, who is in the midst of divorce. After some time her problems with her husband subside and the two make amends, and Lucien is driven mad, proclaiming, "If you do not love me, I love you. And if I love you beware". Lucien then contrives her murder and frames her husband successfully, and disappears shortly after to live as a carnie. There he falls in platonic love with the carnival director's pre-pubescent daughter which arouses the suspicion of paedophilic motivations by the director, who forbids his daughter to see or perform with L'Hotte.

On the verge of being ostracised from the carnival, L'Hotte creates a show of his own that becomes wildly popular—and in the process profitable to the director. L'Hotte then stages a homosexual relationship with his partner in his carnival act to settle suspicions of unwanted interest in the young girl.
