= Mingong =

Migrant workers in China

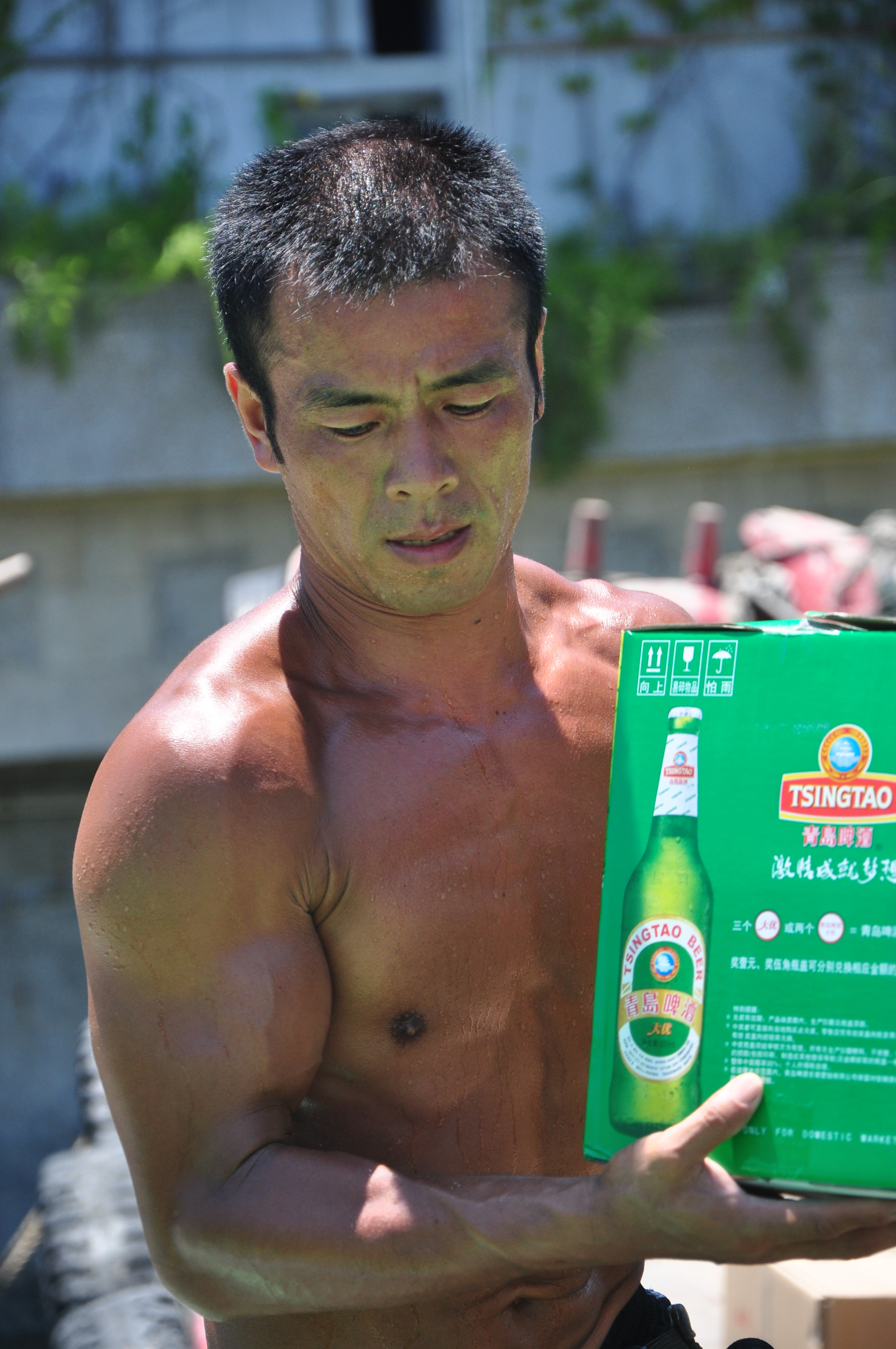
A Mingong working

Mingong (Chinese: 民工) are migrant workers in the People's Republic of China, who, starting in the last decades of the 20th century, have been travelling from the countryside to the cities to work. It is a recent phase of migration in China.

== History ==
The existence of these migrant workers is connected to the Hukou system of the People's Republic of China, with which the government sought to limit the ratio of urbanization of the population. The Hukou system is a system of residence and household registration, which provides citizens with permits for residency, which are required for the use of schools, hospitals and other public facilities. This system prohibits people without a permit from permanently residing in a municipality. Without a permit, none of the aforementioned public services can be utilized.

With the political and economical opening of the People's Republic of China in the 1970s, the need for workers in the urban areas grew. Unschooled labourers were put to work in factories, the construction industry and in big public infrastructure projects, such as rail and roadway construction, as well as the construction of hydroelectric dams. This led to a massive influx of labourers leaving from the countryside. These couldn't officially settle near their workplace, due to the Hukou system, which led to their family staying in the countryside on their farms, while the workers leave home to work. This allows them to return to their plot of farm land once the work is finished.

== Numbers and conditions ==
The word mingong is constructed from the Chinese words "min" (民), short for "nong min" (农民), which means peasant, farmer, or rural resident; and "gong" (工), which means worker. Since these "peasant workers" are not registered, it is unknown exactly how many of these migrant workers exist. According to data from the National Bureau of Statistic of China (NBS), the number of mingong was 290.77 million in 2019.

Some mingong are able to work in the city and live in simple but healthy conditions, that are safer than those they lived in on the countryside. However, most mingong live in slums (urban villages) and don't have long-term contracts. The growing number of workers are forced to settle for low wages, work without contracts and uncertain conditions. If they become unemployed, they have the choice between going back to the countryside or looking for a new job in another urban area.

Familial Effects

Migrant workers often leave children with grandparents or other relatives in rural areas to pursue work in larger metropolitan areas. Studies have shown effects on left-behind children. A longitudinal study by Yao Lu found this separation did not provide children with the educational advantages their parents hoped for, with younger children especially vulnerable to its effects. Zhou, Murphy, and Tao found that children whose parents had both migrated scored significantly lower in Chinese and mathematics, with longer parental absences associated with poorer educational performance particularly among boys.

== Future of the system ==
A reform of the Hukou system is planned, but the realization has yet to be started. Meanwhile, the businesses profit from these developments, which provides them with a flexible and mobile workforce with low wages. This fact, combined with the undervaluation of the Yuan, is at the core of the rapid development and growth of the Chinese economy.

== Literature ==
- Behzad Yaghmaian: The Accidental Capitalist: a People's Story of the New China. Pluto Press, London 2012, ISBN 978-0-7453-3230-7.
- Bettina Gransow: Migrants and Health. LIT-Verlag, Berlin 2010, ISBN 978-3-643-10912-5.
