= Jason Staczek =

- Born: December 4, 1965 (age 60); Washington, D.C.
- Genres: Film scores, orchestral, electronic music
- Occupation: Composer
- Instruments: Hammond organ, piano, cello
- Years active: 1999–present
- Label: Milan Records
- Website: https://staczek.net/

Jason Staczek (born December 4, 1965) is an American composer, record producer and keyboardist.

== Life and career ==
Staczek was born in Washington, D.C., attended high school in Miami and studied physics at the University of Michigan. He played the Hammond organ in Seattle bands and sessions beginning in the 1990s. From 2002 to 2008 Staczek co-owned Chroma Sound, a music and film post-production studio and record label in Seattle. Clients of Chroma Sound included Presidents of the United States of America and Robyn Hitchcock. In 2003 Staczek was hired as staff composer for The Film Company, a Seattle film production studio, through which he met and developed a working relationship with Canadian director Guy Maddin.

Staczek has composed music for the soundtracks to the films Brand Upon the Brain! (2006), My Winnipeg (2008), Keyhole (2011), Jobriath A.D. (2012), The Roper (2013) and Song of the New Earth (2014). Brand Upon the Brain! premiered at the 2006 Toronto International Film Festival, where the silent film was accompanied by a live orchestra conducted by Staczek, narrated by Louis Negin, with sound provided by three live Foley artists and a castrato-style singer. Staczek went on to conduct orchestras accompanying the film's live performances in Berlin, Buenos Aires, New York, Mexico City, San Francisco and Los Angeles.

Staczek was named a Sundance Composer Lab Fellow in 2012. His concert work for cimbalom and orchestra premiered at Benaroya Hall in Seattle in March 2013. The piece was released on the album Celebrate World Music which won the 2014 Independent Music Awards Vox Pop Award for Best Contemporary Classical Album.

== Partial filmography ==
Year	Film	Director	Studio / Developer	Notable Mentions
2006	Brand Upon the Brain!	Guy Maddin	The Film Company	Manohla Dargis (New York Times) Best of 2006. Staczek to conduct orchestral performance of live show presented by Basel Sinfonietta, June 2015.
2008	My Winnipeg	Guy Maddin	Buffalo Gal Pictures, Documentary Channel, Everyday Pictures	#3, Time Magazine's Top 10 Movies of 2008.
2008	Holding This for You	Marissa Rae Niederhauser	Marissa Rae Niederhauser	Official Selection, Dreamscapes 2009, Seattle International Film Festival.
2009	Night Mayor	Guy Maddin	National Film Board of Canada	Won Best Experimental Short at South by Southwest in 2010.
2011	Keyhole	Guy Maddin	Everyday Pictures, Buffalo Gal Pictures	Won Best Canadian Film award at Whistler Film Festival 2011.
2012	Jobriath A.D.	Kieran Turner	Eight Track Tape Productions	Critic's Pick, The Village Voice April, 2014.
2012	The Roper	Ewan McNicol, Anna Sandilands	Lucid	Official Selection, Sundance Film Festival 2013.
2014	Song of the New Earth	Ward Serrill	Woody Creek Pictures	Nominee, Documentary Award Seattle International Film Festival 2014.
Filming	And We Were Young (Work in progress.)	Andy Smetanka	Andy Smetanka	

== TV Series ==
Year	Title	Director	Producers	Notable Mentions
2014	Rocketmen (Work in progress.)	Webster Crowell	Alycia Delmore, Mel Eslyn	

== Partial Discography ==
Year	Album	Artist	Label	Credit
1999	Trad Arr Jones	John Wesley Harding	Appleseed Recordings	Hammond organ, accordion, harpsichord, piano
2000	Rock Star God	The Makers	Sub Pop	Hammond organ, piano
2002	What It Is And How to Get It	Shuggie	Good Ink Records	Hammond organ, piano, Clavinet, Wurlitzer
2003	Only With Laughter Can You Win	Rosie Thomas	Sub Pop	Hammond organ
2003	Motherfuckers Be Trippin'	Supersuckers	Mid Fi	Hammond organ, piano
2005	Live Seattle 12/03/04	Goodness	Kufala	Hammond organ
2005	Alive Without Control	The Black Halos	Century Media Records	Hammond organ, piano, Mellotron
2006	Nothing but Time	Garth Reeves	Chroma Records	Producer, engineer, Hammond organ, piano, accordion, guitar, percussion, tambourine, backing vocals
2011	Keyhole	Jason Staczek	Milan Records	Primary artist
2011	El Sonido Nuevo	Ian Moore and The Lossy Coils	Hablador Records	Piano, Hammond organ
2011	Marble Son	Jesse Sykes & the Sweet Hereafter	Fargo	Piano
2012	You, Anniversary	Lindsay Fuller	ATO Records	Audio engineer, Hammond organ
2012	Pull It Together	Shannon Stephens	Asthmatic Kitty	Fender Rhodes, Hammond organ
2012	Lung of Love	Amy Ray	Daemon Records	Vocal engineer
2013	Imitations	Mark Lanegan	ATO Records	Harpsichord
2013	Celebrate World Music	Various Artists	Burmer Music	Composer of "Lila Sziv"
