= Caelum Vatnsdal =

Canadian writer and filmmaker (born 1970)

Caelum Vatnsdal (born 1970) is a Canadian writer and filmmaker. He is most noted for his books They Came From Within: A History of Canadian Horror Cinema (2004), a comprehensive study of Canadian horror films, and You Don’t Know Me, But You Love Me: The Lives of Dick Miller (2018), a biography of character actor Dick Miller.

As a filmmaker he directed the feature film Black as Hell, Strong as Death, Sweet as Love (1998) and the Weakerthans documentary film We're the Weakerthans, We're from Winnipeg (2010), as well as numerous short films. He has also acted in the films of Guy Maddin, including Careful, Odilon Redon, or The Eye Like a Strange Balloon Mounts Toward Infinity, Sissy Boy Slap Party, Maldoror: Tygers, The Heart of the World and Cowards Bend the Knee.

He worked from 2008 to 2010 as editor of the Icelandic Canadian community newspaper Lögberg-Heimskringla. In 1992 he officially started his career in the film industry working under Guy Maddin on the film Careful, where he filled a small acting role and worked in the art and camera department.
