= Independent Film Festival Boston =

The Independent Film Festival Boston is a not for profit film festival in Boston, Massachusetts.

== History ==
The Independent Film Festival Boston (also known as IFFBoston) was created in 2003 by the non-profit organization the Independent Film Society of Boston. The festival takes place each April in the Boston area's finest art-house cinemas. Over 1,200 films are submitted to the festival each year and roughly the best 90-100 of those are shown. Over 120 screenings take place, most with director Q&A sessions following them. There are also nightly parties for guest filmmakers and passholders as well as weekend panel discussions.

The Independent Film Festival Boston was named "one of the top five film series in Boston" by the Boston Society of Film Critics in the festival's inaugural year of 2003 and was the only film festival on that list. The book The Ultimate Film Festival Survival Guide named the festival "the premier film festival in Boston" and the festival has since been recognized by the Boston Globe, Boston Herald, Boston Phoenix, Boston Magazine, Indiewire, and countless filmmakers as "the premier film festival in Boston". In 2008, MovieMaker Magazine named IFFBoston among "The Top 25 Film Festivals Worth The Entry Fee".

The festival debuted in 2003 with an audience of 10,000 people and has grown in size each year since (2004–15,000 people, 2005–18,000 people, 2006–22,000 people, 2007–23,000 people, 2008–23,400) making it the largest film festival in New England.

== Special guests ==
Special guests of the festival in its first six years included Steve Buscemi, Chris Cooper, Sir Ben Kingsley, John Waters, Will Arnett, Lili Taylor, Illeana Douglas, Melvin Van Peebles, Noam Chomsky, Michael Almereyda, Robert Vaughn, Bill Pullman, Dylan Baker, Famke Janssen, Mary Stuart Masterson, Project Runway's Jay McCarroll, Todd Graff, Congresswoman Cynthia McKinney, Ted Hope, Bob Odenkirk, Bernie Worrell, Ryan Fleck, Anna Boden, Alexandre Rockwell, Eliza Dushku, Danny Huston, Jesse Eisenberg, Doug Pray, Albert Maysles, Saturday Night Live's Fred Armisen, the Daily Show's Rob Corddry and Michael Cera.

== Notable films ==
Films shown at the festival in the first six years included Half Nelson, Murderball, The Corporation, The Proposition, The Saddest Music in the World, Ivans XTC, Lonesome Jim, The Puffy Chair, Fay Grim, Hannah Takes the Stairs, Mutual Appreciation, Me and You and Everyone We Know, Transsiberian, My Winnipeg, Medicine for Melancholy, Ballast, Encounters at the End of the World, The Story of the Weeping Camel and Metallica: Some Kind of Monster as well as the U.S. premier of Azumi.

The festival shows narrative features, documentary features, short films, animation, and experimental works.

== Judging ==
The Independent Film Festival Boston awards Grand Jury, Special Jury prizes, and Audience Awards in the categories of narrative feature, documentary feature and short film. The juries are composed of top film industry professionals.

== Year-round activities ==
The Independent Film Festival Boston also holds monthly screenings throughout the year. The main hub of the festival is the Somerville Theatre in Davis Square, Somerville, Massachusetts. Other venues used by the festival in its first seven years include the Coolidge Corner Theatre , the Brattle Theatre, the Museum of Fine Arts, the Institute of Contemporary Art, and the Jimmy Tingle Theatre.

== IFFBoston testimonials ==
"Yet in only its third year, the Independent Film Festival of Boston has become the major game in town: a smartly programmed and risk-taking festival that balances 'big' indie films with the best in local filmmaking." - Ty Burr, Boston Globe

"IFFBoston has redefined the term 'filmmaker friendly' for every producer, director, editor, cinematographer, composer and actor that has been lucky enough to experience the festival. The audiences are passionate and intelligent, which is every filmmaker's dream." - Joe Swanberg, director of Hannah Takes the Stairs

"[T]he annual Independent Film Festival Boston (IFFB) has accomplished more in its five-year history, than some festivals do with twice as much time and resources. - Matt Dentler, Indiewire

"Definitely one of the best-run film festivals I have been to." - Bob Odenkirk, director of Melvin Goes to Dinner

"Though the word 'independent' sometimes connotes 'small', it's clear that the Independent Film Festival of Boston is THE premiere film festival in the Boston area. From a distributor's standpoint, it's important that a festival handle a film with a certain degree of professionalism and attention to detail. IFFBoston's focus on presenting dynamic, quality films and treating each screening as an event both meets and exceeds those expectations." - Brad Westcott, Magnolia Pictures
