= Night mayor =

- Night mayor (municipal title)

== Films ==
- Night Mayor
- The Night Mayor
