= Twilight of the Ice Nymphs =

- Directed by: Guy Maddin
- Written by: George Toles
- Produced by: Richard Findlay
- Starring: Pascale Bussières; Nigel Whitmey (uncredited); Shelley Duvall; Frank Gorshin; Alice Krige
- Cinematography: Michael Marshall
- Edited by: Reginald Harkema
- Music by: John McCulloch
- Release date: 1997
- Running time: 95 minutes
- Country: Canada
- Language: English
- Budget: $1.5 million

Twilight of the Ice Nymphs is a 1997 fantasy romance film directed by Guy Maddin. The screenplay was written by George Toles and inspired by the novel Pan (1894) by Knut Hamsun, with an additional literary touchstones being the short story "La Vénus d'Ille" (1837) by Prosper Mérimée. Twilight of the Ice Nymphs was Maddin's second feature film in colour and his first shot in 35 mm, on a budget of $1.5 million. As seen in Noam Gonick's documentary Waiting for Twilight, Maddin was dissatisfied with the filmmaking process due to creative interference from his producers.

== Plot ==
A newly released prisoner, Peter Glahn, returns home to the land of Mandragora, where the sun never sets. Aboard the ship, Glahn has a romantic encounter with Juliana Kossel, then proceeds to the family ostrich farm, which is run by his sister Amelia. Amelia is in love with Dr. Isaac Solti, a manipulative gentleman scientist/mesmerist. Cain Ball, Amelia's hired hand, quarrels with her about her promise to sell him the ostrich farm. Peter heads into the forest to go hunting and meets the pregnant Zephyr, who despite her fisherman husband falls for Peter. Zephyr prays to a stone statue of the goddess Venus that stands in the forest that Peter will be hers, and gives the statue her wedding ring as a gift. Zephyr meets Peter again and Venus appears to have worked her magic, since the two embrace, although Peter notes that he is in love with Juliana and Zephyr notes her marriage.

Dr. Solti has likewise been talking to the statue of Venus, which fell over and crushed his leg, causing its amputation. During a picnic, Amelia and Peter meet Solti and Juliana (revealed to be Solti's companion) causing both Glahns to become quite jealous. Solti has mesmerized Juliana and reveals that he orchestrated her affection for Peter as part of his everyday manipulative sadism. Peter assaults Solti and ineffectively attacks his artificial leg. Amelia, meanwhile, has concluded that Cain Ball is trying to kill her and so hammers a giant nail into his skull, sets him on fire, and stuffs his face with live flies, before entering into a semi-catatonic madness herself. Zephyr reveals that she has murdered her husband by leading him into a pit of snakes.

Peter and Juliana reignite their romance briefly, before it sours due to Peter's jealousy. He calls upon the spirits of the forest trees to descend on his tormentors, but they only droop a little. Zephyr attempts to take her ring back from the statue of Venus but it falls over to crush her. Cain, nail in head, hallucinates that the cast has piled into a boat, then dies. Solti leaves Mandragora and Juliana follows. She asks Peter for his dog Aesop as a memento, and he agrees but first kills the dog. Peter retreats with Amelia to a wintry cave.

== Cast ==
- Nigel Whitmey as Peter Glahn (uncredited)
  - Ross McMillan provides the overdubbed voice of Peter Glahn, also uncredited
- Pascale Bussières as Juliana Kossel
- Shelley Duvall as Amelia Glahn
- Frank Gorshin as Cain Ball
- Alice Krige as Zephyr Eccles
- R.H. Thomson as Dr. Isaac Solti
- Ross McMillan as Matthew Eccles

The film's star is not credited: Nigel Whitmey plays the lead role of Peter Glahn, but had his name removed after the producers pressured director Maddin to remove Whitmey's voice from the film and replace it with Ross McMillan's. McMillan is not credited as the voice of Peter Glahn, meaning that the lead role is not credited on-screen.

== Release ==
Twilight of the Ice Nymphs was released to home video on a three-film disc titled The Guy Maddin Collection, which also includes Maddin's short film The Heart of the World and his feature film Archangel. Twilight of the Ice Nymphs is also included on the DVD boxed set The Quintessential Guy Maddin: 5 Films from the Heart of Winnipeg, released by Zeitgeist Video, alongside Archangel, Dracula: Pages from a Virgin's Diary, Careful, and Cowards Bend the Knee.

== Critical reception ==
Twilight of the Ice Nymphs received mixed reviews, and Maddin himself expressed displeasure while working on the film, and disapproval afterwards. Review aggregator Rotten Tomatoes reported a 67% approval rating based on 9 reviews.

Generally, critics considered Twilight a film for Maddin's core fans, although Lisa Alspector of the Chicago Reader noted that Maddin's "overwhelming stylization unexpectedly produces an emotional and psychological authenticity."
