= Neighbors from Hell =

- Created by: Pam Brady
- Written by: Pam Brady; Paul Alexander; Paul Mendelson
- Directed by: John Rice; Raymond S. Persi
- Starring: Will Sasso; Molly Shannon; Patton Oswalt; David Soren; Tracey Fairaway; Kyle McCulloch; Kurtwood Smith; Steve Coogan
- Composer: James Dooley
- Country of origin: United States
- Original language: English
- No. of seasons: 1
- No. of episodes: 10

Production
- Executive producers: Pam Brady; Mireille Soria; Jeffrey Katzenberg
- Running time: 30 minutes
- Production companies: Wounded Poodle; MoonBoy Animation; 20th Century Fox Television

Original release
- Network: TBS; Adult Swim (pilot episode only)
- Release: June 7 – July 26, 2010

Neighbors from Hell is an American adult animated urban fantasy sitcom created by Pam Brady for the cable channel TBS. The series stars Will Sasso, Molly Shannon, Patton Oswalt, David Soren, Tracey Fairaway and Kyle McCulloch and follows a family of demons called the Hellmans, and his pet goblin dog named Pazuzu in order to destroy a drill that could reach the Center of the earth. The series ran from June 7 to July 26, 2010, with the first episode being showed only twice Adult Swim on June 13, labeled as a "sneak peek". 10 episodes were produced.

The series is produced by 20th Century Fox Television, Wounded Poodle and MoonBoy Animation, a short-lived division of DreamWorks Animation, as its second adult animated series after Father of the Pride. The majority of the animation is produced by Bardel Entertainment in Vancouver, with retake animation work handled mostly in-house at Bento Box Entertainment.

== Plot ==
The Hellman family of demons from Hell is sent by Satan to Houston, Texas on a mission to destroy a drill that can dig to the Earth's core. Satan fears that the humans will invade Hell if the drill reaches it. The Hellmans face a culture shock trying to fit in with humans. They also realize that the humans can be as bad as the demons, and that Earth is almost no different from hell.

== Characters ==
=== Main ===
- Balthazor Hellman (voiced by Will Sasso) – The family's patriarch. He is a bit naive but is a very kind-hearted demon. He has a vast knowledge of human behavior from watching much human television in Hell. He almost faced punishment from Satan because of that. He is constantly trying to either get promoted or demoted at work in order to get closer to the drill, the target of which he was sent to destroy. Balthazor is shown to have an evil side too, as he almost drowned Tina's father Zebulon when he insulted his father and tried to get him fired. He appears self-conscious about being overweight, as he gets offended when others make fun of his weight. Despite being a demon, he is overall a nice guy. He actually cares for his friends and deeply loves his family, usually ending each episode having a group hug with his family as well as stating "I love you all". He has the power to breathe fire out of all his cavities such as his mouth, nostrils and once farted fire.
- Tina Hellman (voiced by Molly Shannon) – Balthazor's physically attractive and strong-willed wife. She is the mother of Josh and Mandy. She has a short temper and stubborn streak. She is a bad driver. She is very protective over her family. She is an alcoholic and has an obsession with gossip as she is constantly seen with an alcoholic beverage in one hand and a gossip magazine in the other. Tina is bitter about her abrupt transition from a hardworking employee to an average housewife. She and Balthazor have a passionate and sexually charged marriage.
- Pazuzu (voiced by Patton Oswalt) – The family's helpful goblin dog that pretends to be a regular dog while on Earth. He is shown to have the ability to freeze and unfreeze time in specific situations. He is deeply fond of many pop-culture sensations which explains his love for pop stars like Lady Gaga and the Jonas Brothers. Pazuzu and Vlaartark are often found together, generally up to some sort of mischief.
- Vlaartark Mimlark (voiced by Kyle McCulloch) – The eccentric, possibly schizophrenic, uncle of Josh and Mandy. He enjoys eating cats. He also considers himself of a higher standard, judging by his voice and general knowledge. It's never stated if he's Balthazor or Tina's brother, though they both called him "uncle" as well. He also has gerontophilia.
- Mandy Hellman (voiced by Tracey Fairaway) – Balthazor and Tina's attractive yet materialistic teenage daughter. She speaks with a Valley girl accent. She appears as vain, shallow and obsessed with her cell phone. She is usually texting. She can erase people's memories from their minds. Despite her shallow tendencies, she broke up with Killbride's son Wayne when he showed cruelty to disabled or unpopular kids. She is 15 years old and shown to be ambidextrous.
- Josh Hellman (voiced by David Soren) – Balthazor and Tina's preteen son. A chubby, immature and mischievous young demon boy. He has the ability to emit lasers from his eyes, can talk with animals, and has re-animation powers (only on animals thus far). He is shown to enjoy playing video games. He also likes annoying and fighting with his sister. He also had a crush on a neighborhood girl named Bethany. He is 12 years old.

=== Secondary ===
- Don Killbride (voiced by Kurtwood Smith) – Balthazor's boss and head of Petromundo. He is very ruthless, corrupt, cynical and somewhat of a sadist. He takes a liking towards Balthazar and treats him with the littlest of respect. He is often seen with an oversize golf club. His several vices include bribery, inflicting physical harm, "dog golf", exploiting cheap labor and beating and cheating on his wives. Balthazor sees Killbride as more evil than Satan. He also has a physical attraction to Tina. Overall he is a businessman, and promotes Balthazor when he does his job well. He is a polygamist as he said he has six wives, and only two were shown.
- Marjoe Saint Sparks (voiced by Dina Waters) – The crazy, talkative, annoying and stereotypical Southern Belle next-door neighbor. She engages in bestiality with her dog Champers and annoys Tina to no end. She has a tendency to pop out at random times. Champers often tries to kill himself. She loves to chat about her sex life and family. In the first episode, she is oblivious that Tina is deliberately trying to strangle her to death.
- Chevdet Tevetoglu (voiced by Kyle McCulloch) – Chevdet is Balthazor's best friend and the chief engineer behind the drill project at Petromundo. As a recent immigrant, Chevdet works hard to make a better life for his large Turkish family. When he is not working on the drill or enduring Killbride's constant ethnic slurs, he is often hanging out with Balthazor.
- Satan (voiced by Steve Coogan) – He is the one who sent the Hellmans to Earth to destroy the drill that would enable the humans to invade Hell. He seems to be fond of Tina's looks, but he is not particularly fond of Balthazor. He seems to always have a little monkey-like demon assistant on his shoulder, which is implied to be his sexual lover. Satan once called the servant "a nasty little bitch" then claimed that he loves him that way. He is often sarcastic and witty, appearing at the end of each episode to inquire about the Hellman's progress toward destroying the drill. In the season finale, he finally sees Killbride, and says "Woah, that was Killbride? He is scary. Not a nice person.", hinting some fear of him. Before disappearing in a puff of smoke he usually leaves the room with the comment, "Satan, out!". He is also lactose intolerant.

=== Recurring ===
- Champers – Marjoe's pet poodle. He is suicidal as he is forced into sexual relations with his owner. Throughout the series, he tries to kill himself in different ways, but ends up in failure due to random things (usually caused by the main characters).
- Lorelai Killbride (voiced by Mimi Rogers) – The supposed sixth wife of Don Killbride. A typical snobby trophy wife. She is shown to be as cynical and evil as Tina, with the exception of being a racist. The two initially become friends rather quickly, When Lorelai derides Josh, Tina is annoyed. Lorelai gets drunk often, and was the target of demon possession after willingly abiding by Tina's supposed want for a sexual encounter. She also once did a donkey show.
- Wayne Killbride (voiced by Eric Christian Olsen) – The 21-year-old son of Don Killbride. It is unknown whether he is also Lorelai's son or from a previous marriage. He is attractive but very immature, obnoxious and somewhat intellectually challenged as he is still in the 10th grade. Despite this, he is shown to have true feelings for Mandy as he was willing to partake in a makeover to become a "gay Mexican vampire" which is Mandy's type. He listens to alternative rock music (such as Coldplay) and Dane Cook and shops at Don Ed Hardy brand stores.
The main cast at the Neighbors from Hell panel at the 2010 San Diego Comic-Con

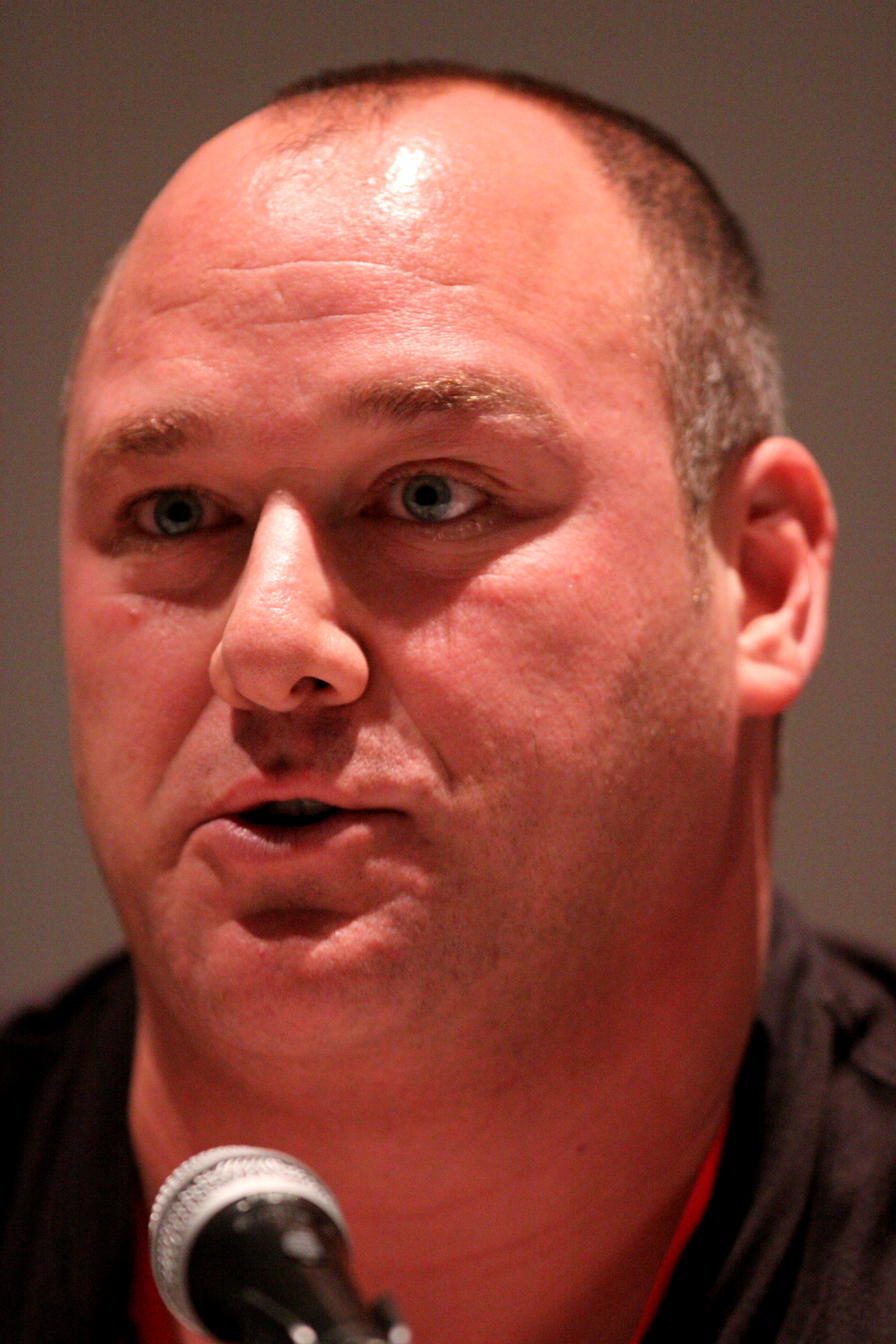
Will Sasso
(Balthazor Hellman)

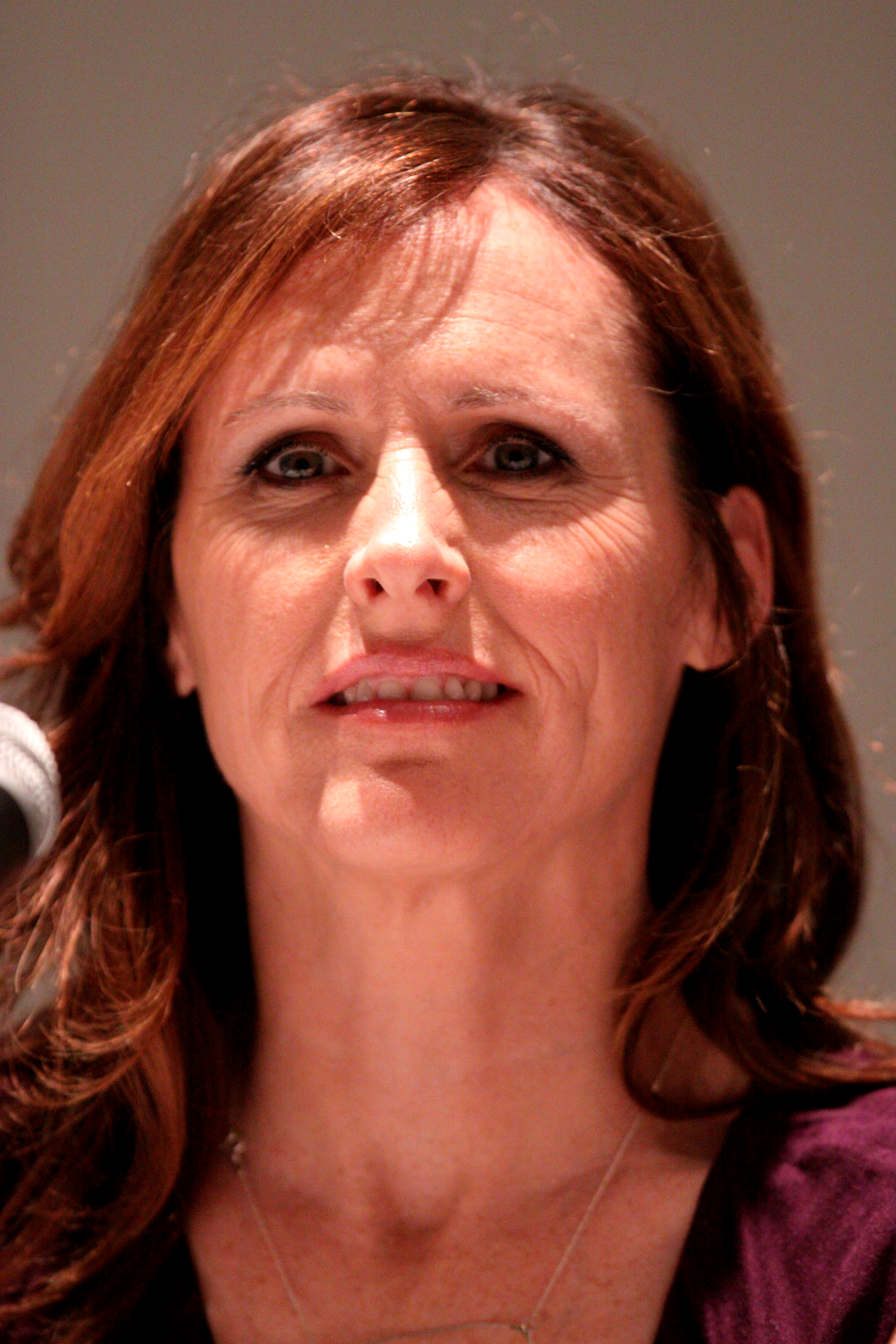
Molly Shannon
(Tina Hellman)

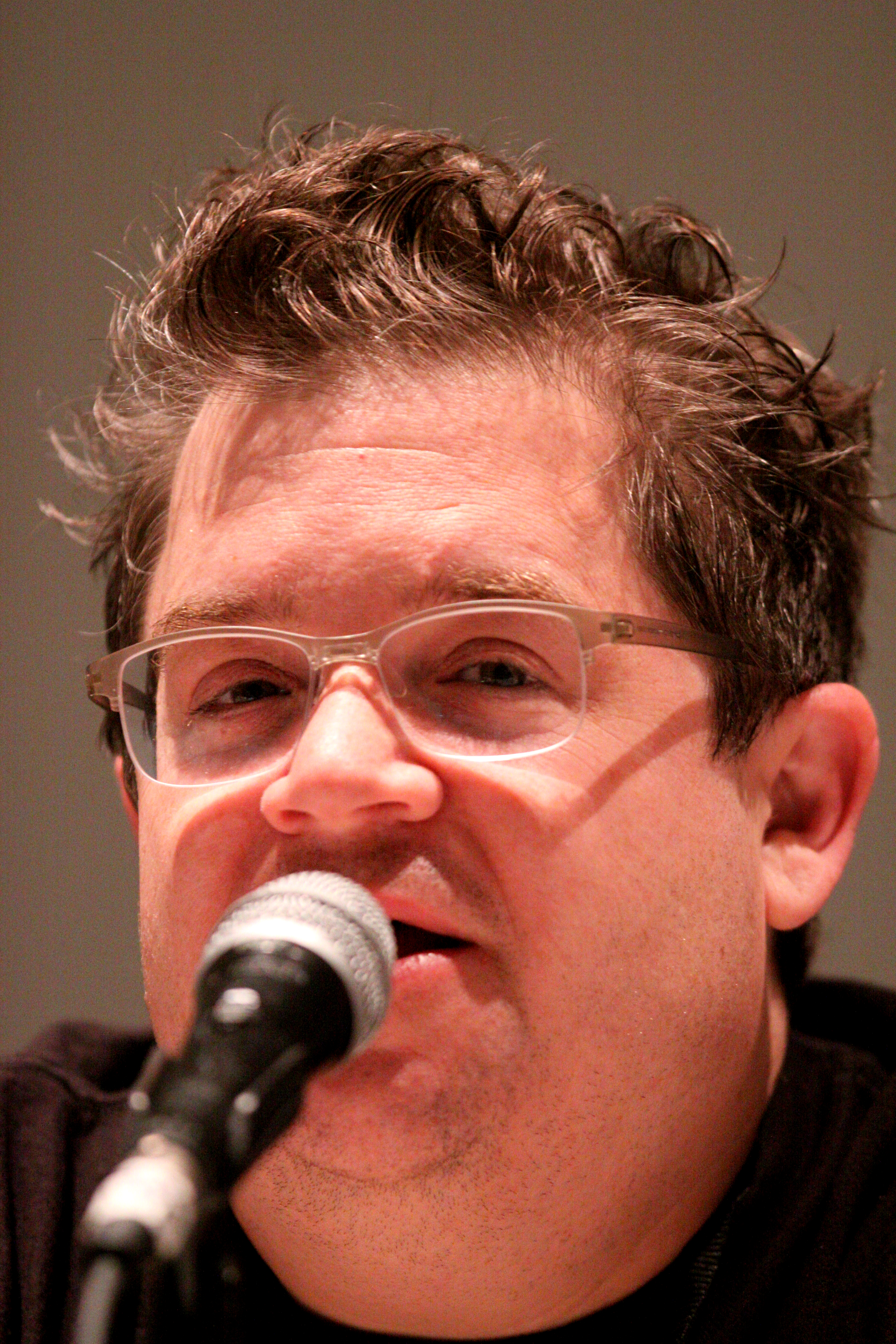
Patton Oswalt
(Pazuzu)

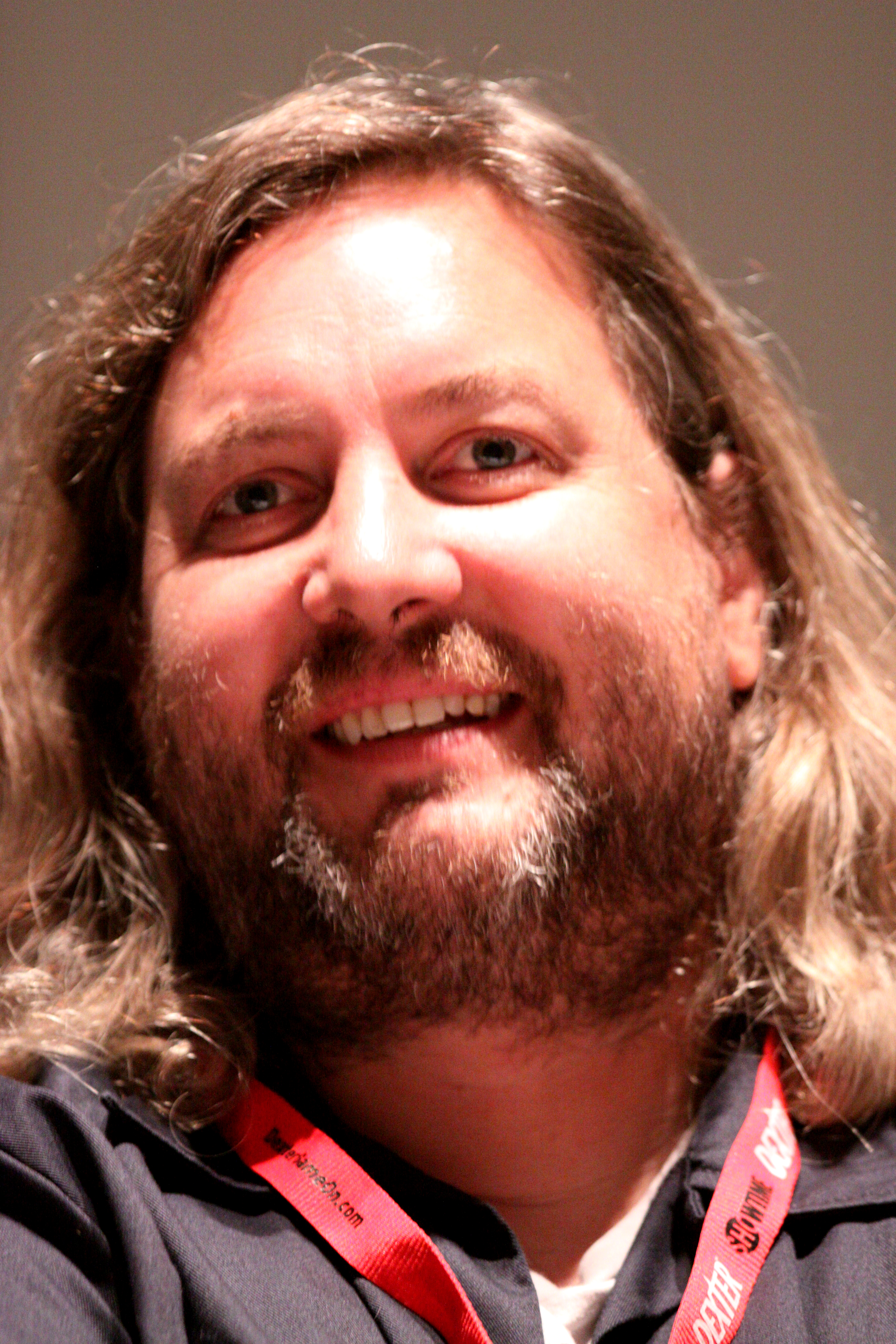
Kyle McCulloch
(Vlaartark Mimlark)

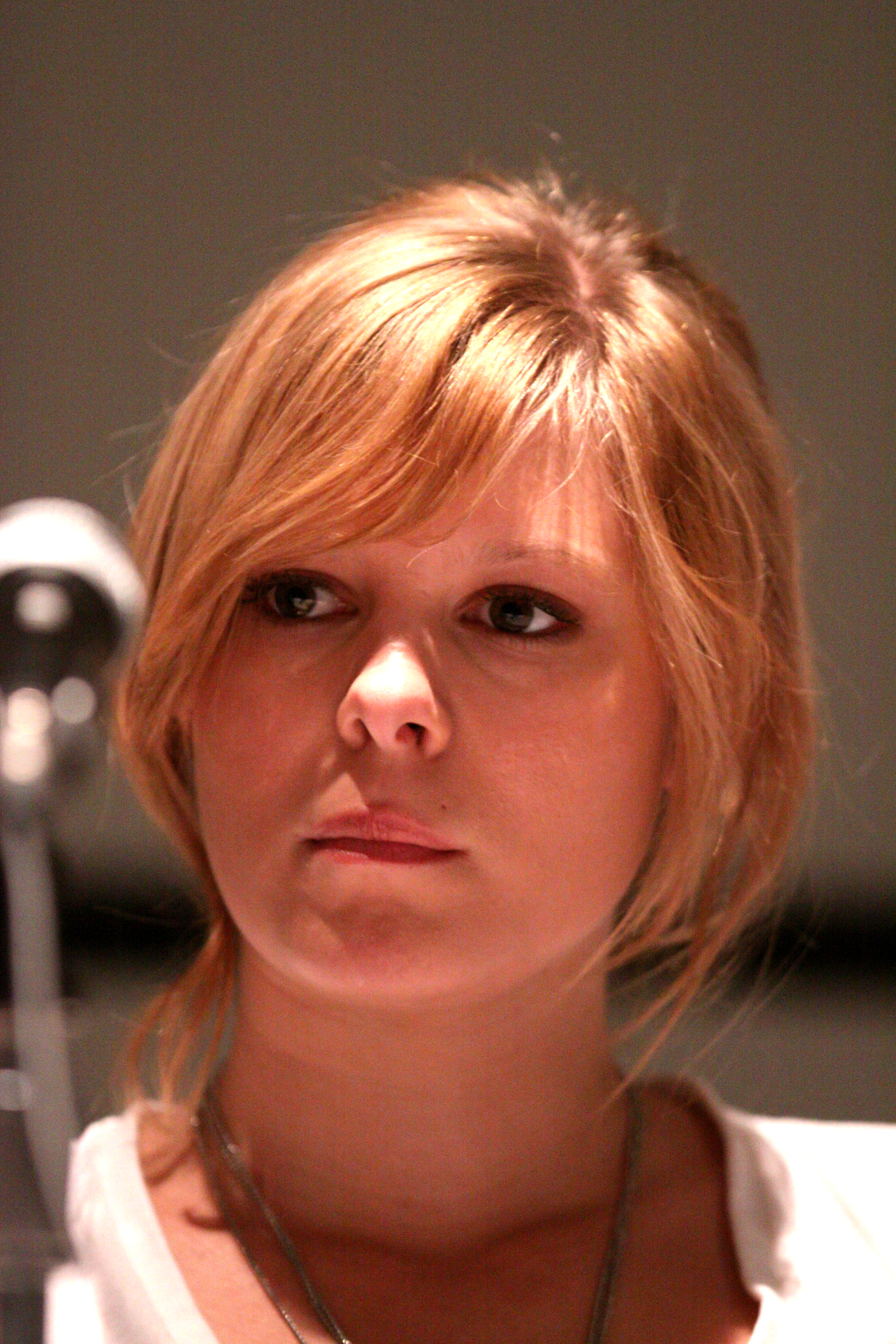
Tracey Fairaway
(Mandy Hellman)

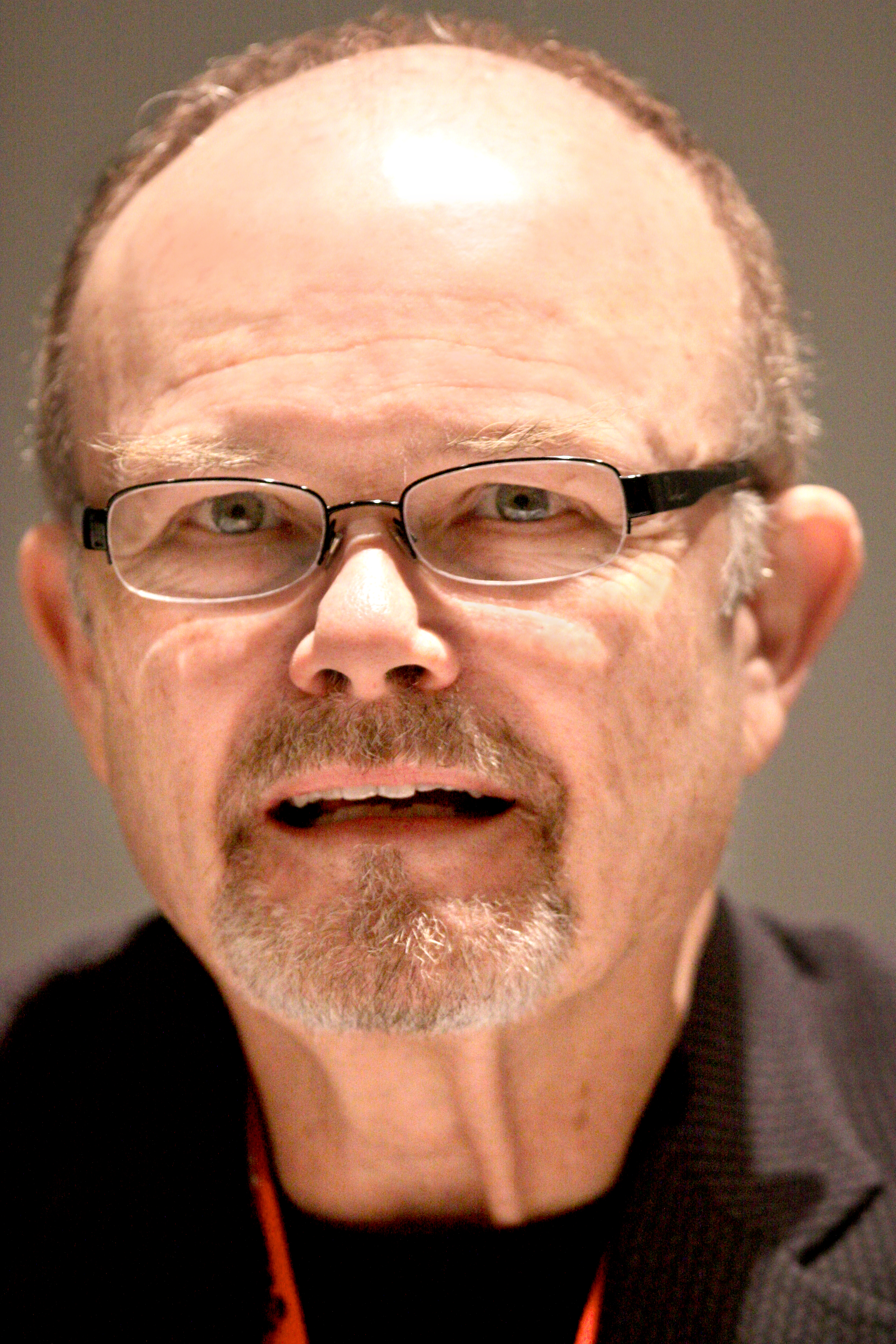
Kurtwood Smith
(Don Killbride)

== Episodes ==
No.	Title	Original release date	Prod. code
1	"Snorfindesdrillsalgoho"	June 7, 2010	1ARV01
The Hellmans, a family of demons, are sent by Satan to the surface of the Earth on a vital mission: Destroy a massive drill that will invade their underworld home. But first they must blend into a suburban Texas neighborhood where the neighbors give a new meaning to the term Hell.
2	"Country Club Hell"	June 14, 2010	1ARV02
Looking for a bonding moment with his boss Killbride, Balthazor scores himself a golf outing at his boss' elite country club. His family accompanies him and struggle to fit in with the humans whose bad behavior both thrills and bewilders the Hellmans.
3	"Gay Vampire Mexican"	June 21, 2010	1ARV03
When Mandy starts to date Killbride's son Wayne, Balthazor uses this opportunity to get closer to Killbride and the drill.
4	"Screw the EPA"	June 28, 2010	1ARV07
Tina and Balthazor try to celebrate their wedding anniversary but are finding it difficult to find time to do so. Meanwhile, Killbride is trying to get a new business plan passed by the EPA and when he learns that the female EPA executive is enamored with Balthazor, Killbride uses him to his advantage.
5	"Family from Hell"	July 5, 2010	1ARV04
Tina's parents from Hell make a visit to Earth, Balthazor makes an extra effort to impress Tina's father. Concerned that their daughter and grandkids will assimilate too well into human culture, the in-laws arrive with a plan to bring the family back to Hell.
6	"Guns for Mutts"	July 12, 2010	1ARV05
When Petromundo hires a British Scientist to speed up the drill process, Josh and the Scientist's "Son" discover a secret within the bowels of Petromundo. This turns the time tables of the Hellman's mission up dramatically leaving Balthazor a choice to save his son or save hell.
7	"Robert the Insult Weight Loss Robot"	July 12, 2010	1ARV06
Balthazor is forced to test out a new weight-loss device, a robot that insults its owner into diet submission. But that is just the beginning of the mechanical being’s reign of terror.
8	"Wolf Power"	July 19, 2010	1ARV08
Tina is responsible for showing the town to the wife of a Japanese businessman doing business with Balthazor's boss, but a case of switched personalities threatens to put the end to the Hellman's mission.
9	"Attila the Rascal"	July 19, 2010	1ARV09
Killbride decides to unfreeze the head of Atilla the Hun to handle some personnel cuts. Unfortunately, the legendary conqueror has some past business to settle with Uncle Vlaartark.
10	"Fantastic 15"	July 26, 2010	1ARV10
Balthazor is recruited by a mysterious man who shares his desire to destroy the drill. But their plan will likely ruin Mandy's 15th birthday Blaargmitvah, including the eagerly anticipated mother-daughter hexagon cage match.

== International broadcast ==
The show was shown in other countries. The series premiered on FX in Brazil and Latin America as of June 2011. In Hungary, it debuted on Comedy Central On February 7, 2012. In Poland the show aired on Fox on April 25, 2012. In Russia, it was shown on 2x2. The 2010s was available on Netflix in the 2020s, and on Star+ in some Latin American countries. It is currently available on Disney+ in Latin America.
