= The Pinkertons =

2014 Canadian TV series

- Genre: Western; Period drama
- Created by: Kevin Abrams; Adam Moore
- Starring: Angus Macfadyen; Martha MacIsaac; Jacob Blair
- Composer: Shawn Pierce
- Country of origin: Canada
- Original language: English
- No. of seasons: 1
- No. of episodes: 22

Production
- Executive producers: Kevin Abrams; Adam Moore; Suzanne Berger; Phyllis Laing; Rob Heydon
- Production location: Grosse Isle, Manitoba
- Running time: 44 minutes
- Production companies: Rosetta Media; Buffalo Gal Pictures

Original release
- Network: First-run syndication
- Release: October 4, 2014 – May 23, 2015

The Pinkertons is a Canadian Western police procedural television series which features crime cases of the Pinkerton detective agency. The show is officially licensed with the Pinkerton detective agency, and features stories based on actual cases from the Pinkerton detective agency archives dating to the 1860s.

The program is produced by Rosetta Media and Buffalo Gal Pictures, in partnership with Channel Zero. Production of this first-run syndicated television show was announced in April 2014, and filming began the following August.

== Cast ==
=== Main ===
- Martha MacIsaac, as Kate Warne, a Pinkerton agent and the first female detective in US history.
- Jacob Blair, as William Pinkerton, the founder's son and also, a Pinkerton agent.

=== Recurring ===
- Angus Macfadyen as Allan Pinkerton, the founder of the detective agency.
- Jennifer Pudavick as Annalee Webb, proprietor of the Dubois Hotel and Saloon.
- David Brown as Sheriff Lawrence Logan.
- Ray Strachan as John Bell, caretaker of the farm where Kate's rented house is located
- Dean Fujioka as Kenji Harada, originally a client, and later an apprentice Pinkerton agent.

== Episodes ==
No. in season	Title	Directed by	Written by	Original release date	Prod. code
1	"Kansas City"	Paul Fox	Kevin Abrams and Adam Moore	October 4, 2014	101
Allan Pinkerton arrives in Kansas City, where his son, Will, is investigating a train robbery. Allan assigns Will to work with Kate Warne, the world's first female detective, who has been a Pinkertons agent for several years.
2	"Double Shot"	Michael DeCarlo	Kevin Abrams and Adam Moore	October 11, 2014	102
A whiskey magnate is found dead, and the investigation involves the dead man's business partner and family.
3	"The Play's The Thing"	Paul Fox	Kevin Abrams and Adam Moore	October 18, 2014	103
The death of an actor during a performance of Hamlet sends Will under cover, and reveals a secret held by another cast member.
4	"The Fourth Man"	Michael DeCarlo	Roy Sallows	November 1, 2014	104
What appears to be a murder arising from a card game turns out to be an international incident between the United States and Japan. The Pinkertons' client, a friend of the murdered man, becomes too eager to participate in the investigation.
5	"The Hero of Liberty Gap"	Don McCutcheon	Glenn Davis and William Laurin	November 8, 2014	105
A charismatic Civil War hero and mayoral candidate is attacked during a speech, and the Pinkertons are drawn into a web of political intrigue.
6	"Lines of Betrayal"	Gary Yates	Alison Lea Bingeman, Tony Elliot, Alexandra Mircheff and Christina Ray	November 22, 2014	106
Kate investigates a murder to which she is a witness. When it is revealed that the victim is an undercover Pinkertons agent, Allan returns to find possible corruption within the agency.
7	"The Case of the Dead Dog"	Jeff Beesley	Ira Parker	January 17, 2015	107
When Will offers to help a loner find the killer of his dog, he and Kate land in the middle of a feud between a railroad company and the local farmers.
8	"To the Sunset"	Gary Yates	Glenn Davis and William Laurin	January 24, 2015	108
In a case involving the murder of a member of the Chippewa Tribe, Will and Kate's only witness is a 12-year-old Chippewa boy, who doesn't speak English.
9	"In Marm's Way"	Douglas Mitchell	Alison Lea Bingeman	January 31, 2015	109
A woman arrives from the East, enlisting the Pinkertons' help to find her missing nephew. Their investigation reveals a secret about their friend, John Bell.
10	"The Sweet Science"	Douglas Mitchell	Kevin Abrams and Adam Moore	February 7, 2015	110
Kate takes an unexpected interest in a boxing match, as one of the participants is a man from her past. When one of the other pugilists is murdered, the investigation tests her ability to remain impartial..
11	"The Devil's Trade"	Gary Yates	Christina Ray and Alexandra Mircheff	February 14, 2015	111
The host of a travelling spiritualist show is murdered, and the Pinkertons become involved in a séance. A previous client returns as a detective, hired by a man who had been cheated by the show.
12	"Reunion"	Gary Yates	Avrum Jacobson and Tony Elliott	February 21, 2015	112
The Pinkertons investigate the connection between the murder of a stranger and a visiting group of four former Civil War nurses.
13	"Frontier Desperados"	Don McCutcheon	Graham Clegg	February 28, 2015	113
A young woman and her father hire the Pinkertons to investigate the abduction of her husband.
14	"Old Pap"	Don McCutcheon	Glenn Davis and William Laurin	March 7, 2015	114
The detectives encounter an enemy from Kate's past: Sterling Price, a southern General who wreaks havoc as he schemes to create a new Confederacy.
15	"On Account of Huckleberries"	Norma Bailey	Avrum Jacobson	March 14, 2015	115
Sheriff Logan gets too close to his latest case, when the remains of a woman he once loved are discovered--and he becomes a prime suspect in her murder.
16	"Mudd and Clay"	Norma Bailey	Roy Sallows	April 11, 2015	116
The Pinkertons must prevent mob violence when a snowstorm traps them, and the criminal they're bringing to trial, with the criminal's vengeful victims.
17	"Forever Free"	Douglas Mitchell	Alison Lea Bingeman	April 18, 2015	117
When a regiment of Buffalo Soldiers comes to town, their cook disappears--and the detectives' investigation uncovers some tragic secrets.
18	"Think of the Children"	Douglas Mitchell	Christina Ray	April 25, 2015	118
The detectives go undercover to investigate the murder of a children's charity administrator.
19	"Murder on the Western Express"	Douglas Mitchell	Avrum Jacobson	May 2, 2015	119
A new client travels to Kansas City, to discuss a case with the Pinkertons. When the stage coach arrives, all aboard – the client, another passenger, and the driver – have been murdered.
20	"Review"	Douglas Mitchell	Kevin Abrams and Adam Moore	May 9, 2015	120
Robert Pinkerton, Will's brother, arrives in Kansas City to evaluate the effectiveness of the agency's Kansas City operations. Will and Kate suspect Robert of having ulterior motives.
21	"The Better Angels of Our Nature"	Jeff Beesley	Kevin Abrams, Adam Moore and Angus Macfadyen	May 16, 2015	121
A biography of Confederate spy Rose O'Neal Greenhow makes nasty allegations about Allan--and when the book's publisher is murdered, Allan becomes the prime suspect.
22	"To the Death"	Jeff Beesley	Avrum Jacobson	May 23, 2015	122
A sniper is killing residents of Kansas City one by one. Will and Kate race to catch the shooter, unaware that the gunman has his sights set on the very heart of the Pinkerton agency.

== Broadcast ==
In the United States, the series was distributed by Rohrs Media Group. The 22-episode first season was made available on Netflix in November 2016 (September in the UK).

The program made its Canadian debut on January 27, 2015 on CHCH, an independent television station owned by Channel Zero.

The series premiered on UKTV's Drama channel in the United Kingdom and Ireland on 30 August 2015.

== Awards and nominations ==
Year	Award	Category	Nominee	Result	Ref
2015	Directors Guild of Canada Awards	Best Television Series - Drama	Paul Fox, Douglas Mitchell, Martin Ellis, Lesley Oswald, Tamara Mauthe, Aaron Graham, Cody McCullough, Tamara Harland, Paul Courchaine, Adriana O'Neil, Shannon Jacques, Cathie J. Edgar, Cliff Sumter, Paul Shikata, Elma Bello, Dashen Naidoo, Eric Goddard (for "Kansas City")	Nominated	
2016	ACTRA Manitoba Awards	Most Outstanding Performance by a Female Artist - Television	Rebecca Gibson	Won	
2016	ACTRA Manitoba Awards	Most Outstanding Performance by a Female Artist - Television	Lauren Cochrane	Nominated	
2016	ACTRA Manitoba Awards	Most Outstanding Performance by a Female Artist - Television	Jennifer Pudavick	Nominated	
2016	ACTRA Manitoba Awards	Most Outstanding Performance by a Female Artist - Television	Nancy Sorel	Nominated	
2016	ACTRA Manitoba Awards	Most Outstanding Performance by a Male Artist - Television	David Brown	Won	
2016	ACTRA Manitoba Awards	Most Outstanding Performance by a Male Artist - Television	John C. MacDonald	Nominated	
2016	ACTRA Manitoba Awards	Most Outstanding Performance by a Male Artist - Television	Arne MacPherson	Nominated	
2016	ACTRA Manitoba Awards	Most Outstanding Performance by a Male Artist - Television	Stephen Eric McIntyre	Nominated	
2016	ACTRA Manitoba Awards	Most Outstanding Performance by a Male Artist - Television	Ray Strachan	Nominated	
2016	ACTRA Manitoba Awards	Most Outstanding Stunt Performance	Sean Skene, Bj Verot	Won	
