= Night Mayor =

- Directed by: Guy Maddin
- Written by: Guy Maddin
- Produced by: Joe MacDonald; Lindsay Hamel
- Starring: Nihad Ademi; Mike Bell; Timna Ben Ari; Darcy Fehr; Audrey Neale; Brent Neale; Shalini Sharma
- Cinematography: Benjamin Kasulke
- Edited by: John Gurdebeke
- Music by: Jason Staczek
- Distributed by: National Film Board of Canada
- Release date: September 12, 2009
- Running time: 14 minutes
- Country: Canada

Night Mayor is a 2009 short film by Guy Maddin, about a fictional inventor in Winnipeg who uses the Aurora Borealis to broadcast images of Canada from coast to coast in 1939, until the Canadian government shuts down his illegal project.

The National Film Board of Canada, which was founded in 1939, commissioned Maddin to create a film for its 70th anniversary. In making Night Mayor, Maddin was inspired by his experience researching the NFB's film archives for his 2007 film My Winnipeg, stating:

“I lost myself for hours, days even, among those dreamy images, constantly finding shots and sequences I’d have been very proud to have created myself. So I had to content myself with including them in this new Film Board project, and hopefully magicking together a framework that was worthy of them.”

The film's main character uses a fictional device called the "Telemelodium" to broadcast his images, which is based on the Telharmonium, an early electronic musical instrument.

Night Mayor was produced by the NFB in Winnipeg and received the Best Experimental Short award at the 2010 South by Southwest festival. It premiered at the Toronto International Film Festival.
