= Archangel (1990 film) =

- VHS cover
- Directed by: Guy Maddin
- Written by: George Toles; Guy Maddin
- Produced by: Andre Bennett; Greg Klymkiw
- Starring: Kyle McCulloch; Michael Gottli; David Falkenburg; Michael O'Sullivan; Margaret Anne MacLeod; Ari Cohen; Sarah Neville; Kathy Marykuca; Victor Cowie; Robert Lougheed; Stephen Snyder
- Cinematography: Guy Maddin
- Edited by: Guy Maddin
- Production companies: Cinephile; Ordnance Pictures
- Distributed by: Zeitgeist Films
- Release date: September 1, 1990
- Running time: 83 minutes
- Country: Canada
- Language: English

Archangel is a 1990 comedy-drama film directed by Guy Maddin. The film fictionalizes, in a general sense, historical conflict related to the Bolshevik Revolution occurring in the Arkhangelsk (Archangel) region of Russia, a basic concept presented to Maddin by John Harvie. The film marks Maddin's first formal collaboration with co-screenwriter George Toles.

Maddin shot Archangel in black and white, on 16-m.m. film, on a budget of $430,000. Maddin modeled the film on the style of a part-talkie, an early cinema genre. The "basic situation" of the film's story was "suggested by Henry Green's 1946 novel Back."

== Plot ==
Archangel is set in 1919 in the northern Russian area of Archangel, during a brief historical moment of Canadian intervention in the Russian Civil War following the end of World War I. One-legged Canadian soldier Lt. John Boles sighs on the rail of a steamship over the ashes of his dead lover Iris. An officer mistakes Iris' urn for a bottle of liquor and throws it overboard into the sea. A narrator then delivers a sermon on the glories of Love and the horrors of Self-Love/Pride and how it forms the roots of War. (Maddin's daughter Jilian makes a cameo here as a young Cossack girl who orders the execution of a young boy.)

Boles arrives in the town of Archangel as an Allied trooper and billets with a local family consisting of a brave son, Geza, a cowardly father, Jannings, and mother Danchuk (who is immediately smitten with Boles) and a grandmother simply called "Baba" along with a seemingly nameless baby. Geza has a seizure as Boles arrives but Boles treats him by scrubbing the boy's torso with horsehair brushes. He then prescribes Geza horsehair to eat (to cure worms) and other folk remedies, while scoffing at the folk remedies Baba offers. Veronkha enters and Boles spies her in a mirror and faints, so affected by her resemblance to his lost love Iris. After reviving, Boles remains convinced that Veronkha in fact is Iris, forgetting that Iris has died. As coincidence would have it, Veronkha's husband Philbin also suffers amnesia, and has forgotten everything after his wedding day. He arrives with his doctor who explains that Philbin will relive his wedding day over and over without remembering what came after. Veronkha rebuffs Philbin's advances and leaves.

Boles dresses up in full regalia and Geza admires his medals, for which Danchuk decides he should be punished. Jannings is too cowardly to flog the boy, so Boles steps in to whip Geza, which makes Geza admire Boles further. The citizenry of Archangel next participates in staging various battle tableaux, posing as victorious over the Huns while a narrator provides commentary on their bravery. Soon after, a real battle takes place, after which Boles and Danchuk travel over a field of corpses that they discover are mostly just resting. However, they do raise one grave marker for a single dead soldier. Boles next follows Veronkha, hoping to learn where she lives, but instead she goes to meet with Philbin's doctor and is hypnotized so that she can recount her wedding night, during which Philbin first forgets their marriage and Veronkha finds him having sex with the front-desk girl. The doctor mentions a rumour that Veronkha has had a child and Boles somehow jumps to the conclusion that the child is his (belonging to him and Iris, who he still believes Veronkha to be) and confuses Danchuk's baby as this child, heading back to his billet to console said baby.

Boles sets out to find Veronkha's home yet again, following a treasure map that is also her marriage certificate to Philbin. The dreamlike trek ends in failure. Next another battle begins, prefaced by a flood of rabbits into the "sleepy trenches" where the soldiers have all but fallen asleep. At the last minute they realize that the rabbits have been fleeing the Bolsheviks and an attack is upon them. Some Bolsheviks break into the family's home and threaten Geza after eviscerating Jannings. However, in a final act of bravery, Jannings strangles them with his own intestines. Unfortunately, Geza's head has been covered with a burlap sack and even as his father dies a hero Geza believes him to have died a coward, believing he's been saved by Philbin.

Veronkha decides to renew her marriage to Philbin after annulling her first marriage, and they fly back to the Murmansk Hotel to repeat their honeymoon. Boles follows, and Veronkha mistakes Boles for Philbin, confessing a false love for Boles to Boles thinking she will make Philbin jealous. Veronkha is so shocked when she discovers that Boles isn't Philbin that she develops amnesia as well. Boles takes this opportunity to try to convince Veronkha that she is Iris. Veronkha disappears, and Boles follows the marriage certificate/treasure map again to find her, and does. They reunite gloriously, until Veronkha sees Philbin and remembers who she is, then rejects Boles and threatens to kill him if he touches her again. Boles, dismayed, heads back to the war, although first he begs Danchuk to take care of "his" baby (actually, already hers) if anything should happen to him.

Geza is killed in this battle, his ghost reunited with the ghost of his father and finally realizing that his father died a hero, saving him. Boles launches a final assault and is injured by a grenade marked "Gott strafe Kanada" [German for "God punish Canada"], staggering through the same treasure map route that previously took him to Veronkha—this time he arrives at the scene of her marriage (again) to Philbin. Boles then leaves Archangel to return home to Canada, destroyed.

== Cast ==
- Kyle McCulloch as Lt. John Boles
- Michael Gottli as Jannings
- David Falkenburg as Geza
- Michael O'Sullivan as Doctor
- Margaret Anne MacLeod as Baba
- Ari Cohen as Philbin
- Sarah Neville as Danchuk
- Kathy Marykuca as Veronkha
- Victor Cowie as Sea Captain
- Robert Lougheed as Kaiser Wilhelm II
- Stephen Snyder as Stage Kaiser Wilhelm II

== Release ==
Archangel premiered at the Toronto Film Festival, and was released to home video on a three-film disc titled The Guy Maddin Collection, which also includes Maddin's short film The Heart of the World and his feature film Twilight of the Ice Nymphs. Archangel is also included on the DVD boxed set The Quintessential Guy Maddin: 5 Films from the Heart of Winnipeg, released by Zeitgeist Video, alongside Careful, Dracula: Pages from a Virgin's Diary, Twilight of the Ice Nymphs, and Cowards Bend the Knee.

In Spring 2008, the Winnipeg Film Group restored the film and struck four new 35-m.m. film prints in order to re-present the film around the world. This restoration process removes some intertitles and colour tinting that had been introduced by Maddin for the D.V.D. release.

In 2023, Telefilm Canada announced that the film was one of 23 titles that will be digitally restored under its new Canadian Cinema Reignited program to preserve classic Canadian films.

== Critical reception ==
The film received generally positive reviews, with review aggregator Rotten Tomatoes reporting a 75% approval rating based on 8 reviews, and an average rating of 6.5/10.

Film critic J. Hoberman praised the film, and noted that such stylistic approaches were typical of Maddin's growing body of work: "Maddin's most distinctive trait is an uncanny ability to exhume and redeploy forgotten cinematic conventions." Jonathan Rosenbaum noted that the film was "alternately creepy and beautiful."

== Awards ==
In 1991, Archangel was awarded Best Experimental Film by the National Society of Film Critics.
