= Sissy Boy Slap Party =

- Directed by: Guy Maddin
- Written by: Guy Maddin
- Produced by: Guy Maddin
- Starring: Louis Negin
- Cinematography: Guy Maddin
- Edited by: John Gurdebeke; Guy Maddin
- Music by: Dennis Frajerman
- Production companies: IFC Productions; Manitoba Film & Sound Development Corporation; Bravo!FACT
- Release dates: 1994 (lost original version); 2004 (remake)
- Running time: 6 minutes
- Country: Canada

Sissy Boy Slap Party is a Canadian experimental short film directed by Guy Maddin. Set on an island paradise, the film depicts a group of men who become caught up in a homoerotic apparent orgy of slapping after an older man (Louis Negin) warns them not to slap each other while he is away on an errand to buy condoms.

The film's cast includes Noam Gonick, Caelum Vatnsdal, Simon Hughes, Michael Powell, John K. Samson, Leith Clark, David Lewis, Don Hewak and Kenny Omega.

The film was first created in 1994, but the original print was lost. Maddin then recreated a new version in 2004, when he was commissioned to create several short films for Bravo as an advance promotional tie-in to his forthcoming feature film The Saddest Music in the World. The film was named for a game Vatnsdal frequently played with his friends, whose rules required them to attempt to slap each other while keeping their elbows locked to their sides to limit their range of motion.

The film was included on the DVD release of The Saddest Music in the World, and was selected by John Waters for television broadcast on his film anthology series John Waters Presents Movies That Will Corrupt You in 2006. It was later added to the Vimeo platform.
