= Kyle McCulloch =

Canadian writer

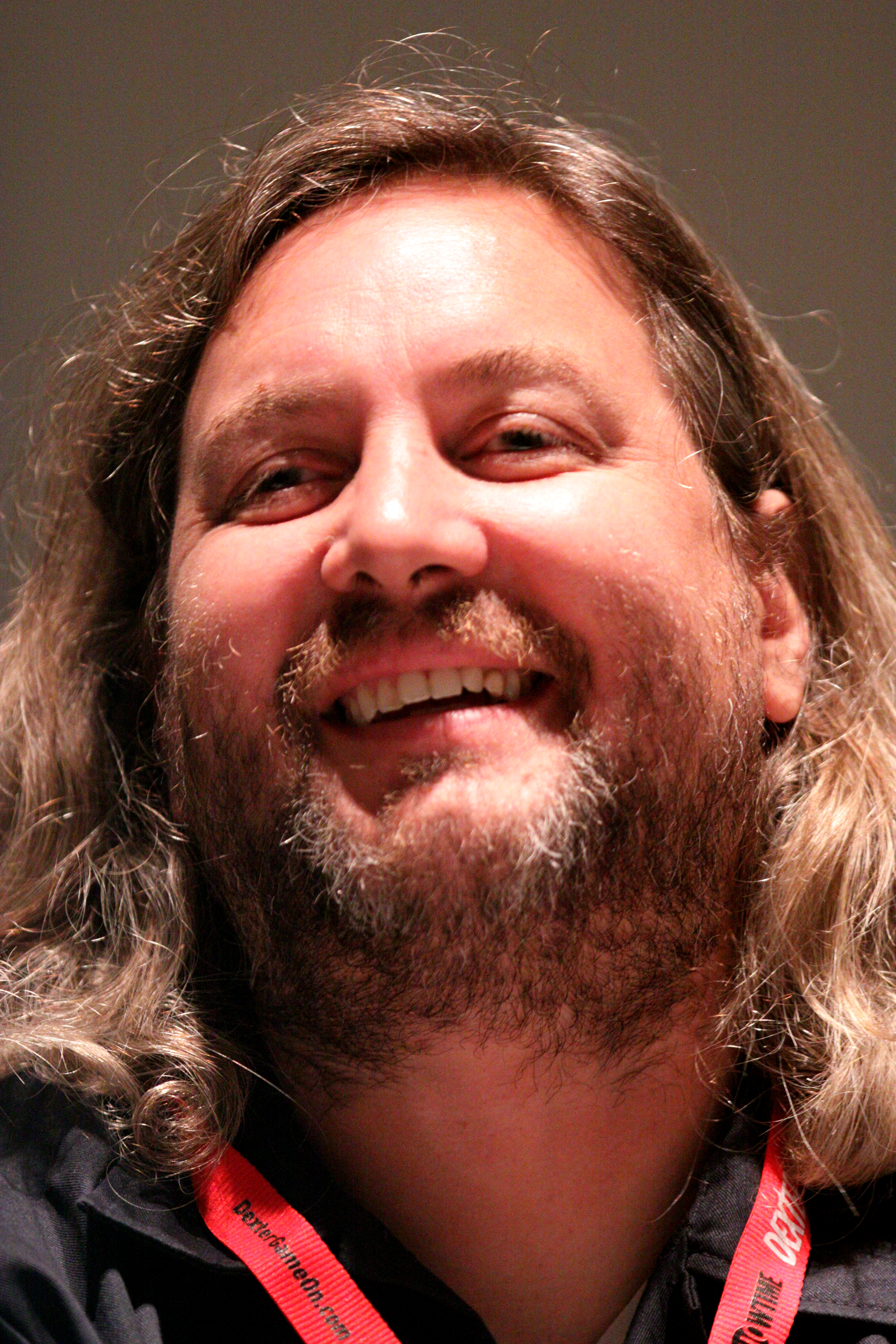
- McCulloch at San Diego Comic-Con in July 2010
- Born: November 11, 1962 (age 63); Winnipeg, Manitoba, Canada
- Occupation: Writer
- Years active: 1983–present
- Known for: Creator of Mr Wong

Kyle McCulloch (born November 11, 1962) is a Canadian writer for the TV cartoon South Park, and is largely responsible for the show's Canadian culture themes. He will also occasionally provide the voice for one-time use characters, such as Gary Harrison in "All About Mormons". He was a story editor and writer on SpongeBob SquarePants. He wrote one episode in season 4, and wrote "A Day Like This" song for the 10th anniversary special Truth or Square. He returned to work on the show in season 9, but left again to work on Lady Dynamite. He was set to make his feature film debut writing and directing The SpongeBob Movie: Sponge on the Run along with Paul Tibbitt, who was originally set to return to direct the film, but they were later replaced by The SpongeBob SquarePants Movie writer, Tim Hill.

Born in Regina, Saskatchewan, McCulloch is also the voice and creator of Mr. Wong in the online cartoon series at icebox.com. The son of retired CBC Radio announcer Tom McCulloch, Kyle grew up in Winnipeg, Manitoba, and started his career acting in Guy Maddin films such as Archangel, Careful, and Tales from the Gimli Hospital. In 1990, he performed in his own play at the Winnipeg Fringe Festival.

== Filmography ==
=== Television ===
Year	Title	Role	Notes
1999–2008	South Park	Gary Harrison, various	staff writer, actor, producer, consultant
2001	That's My Bush!	Kyle in Eenie, Meenie, Miney, MURDER!	staff writer, actor
2005; 2009; 2015–2016	SpongeBob SquarePants	Traveling Salesman	staff writer, writer, story editor, songwriter, voice actor
2010	Neighbors from Hell	Uncle Vlaartark, Chevdet Tevetoglu	actor
2013–2015	China, IL		staff writer
2016–2017	Lady Dynamite	Bert	writer, producer, actor
2018–2019	Arrested Development		consulting producer
