= Brand upon the Brain! =

- Theatrical film poster
- Directed by: Guy Maddin
- Written by: Guy Maddin; George Toles
- Produced by: Amy Jacobson
- Starring: Sullivan Brown; Gretchen Krich; Maya Lawson; Erik Steffen Maahs; Katherine E. Scharhon
- Cinematography: Benjamin Kasulke
- Edited by: John Gurdebeke
- Music by: Jason Staczek
- Production company: Seattle Classic Films
- Release dates: September 8, 2006 (TIFF); October 15, 2006 (NYFF)
- Running time: 99 minutes
- Countries: Canada; United States
- Language: Silent
- Budget: $40,000

Brand upon the Brain! is a 2006 avant-garde silent film directed by Guy Maddin and shot in Seattle with local actors. Maddin directed the film from a script co-written with George Toles, shooting over nine days and editing over three months, on an estimated budget of $40,000.

== Plot ==
Guy Maddin (played by Erik Steffen Maahs as an adult, and Sullivan Brown as a child), returns to Black Notch, a deserted island on which stands a lighthouse that was his family home, an orphanage run by his parents, to slap a fresh coat of paint on the lighthouse. The film is divided into twelve chapters, each of which is a flashback that Guy's ancestral house-painting has brought to the fore of his memory.

Guy, 12 years old in his memory, attends a secret meeting of orphans run by Savage Tom, a believer in pagan rituals. Tom says he will cut out the heart of Guy's friend Neddie but Guy's domineering mother interrupts through the use of her "aerophone," a radio/loudspeaker that she uses to communicate across the entirety of the island and so keep control of her children, whom she also spies on with the help of a telescope mounted with the lighthouse's revolving light. In the orphanage/lighthouse, mother delights in repressing the orphans' desires as fully as possible, especially the sexual yearnings of Sis. Mother relates that she herself was an orphan because Maddin's grandmother was bald and scalped her sister for her hair, while her sister was so jealous of the pregnancy that Maddin's mother was literally cut out of her own mother's stomach. Maddin's father, little-seen, spends his time in a basement laboratory while Mother oversees all else.

In the woods one day, Guy meets a young girl, Wendy Hale, a famous teen detective investigating why orphans adopted from the island all have holes bored in the backs of their heads. Guy falls for Wendy and the two join Sis and Neddie for a game of spin the bottle. Wendy falls in love with Sis and impersonates her twin brother Chance in order to pursue her. Guy develops a "Boy crush" on the disguised Wendy/Chance, who moves into the orphanage to further her/his investigation. Guy helps Wendy/Chance investigate and they discover that Father is using a sharp signet ring to drill into the skulls and draw nectar from their brains of the orphans (and his own children). The nectar is harvested and shipped to the mainland, and also used to extend Mother's youth. She becomes twenty years younger, and hopes to eventually return to infancy, but the effects are daily reversed by the age-ifying efforts of keeping Sis and the other children in line and properly repressed. Sis being the biggest problem, Mother sends her for additional nectar-harvesting, but the over-harvesting causes Sis to murder Father in self-defense.

Father is buried near the water and the orphans have to jump on the coffin so that it will sink into the flooded grave. Mother attempts suicide by dramatically taking poison and calling the orphans to her bedside to witness the lengths to which they've driven her. Sis has discovered that Chance is Wendy but nevertheless plans to marry the girl. Mother is enraged by the marriage and threatens to tell Father. To accomplish this, she exhumes the corpse and "boosts" it back to life using jumper cables connected to her own racing, nectar-infused heart. The zombie Father resumes his normal activities. Mother curses Sis further and becomes frenzied with hunger for more nectar. Guy stumbles upon Mother in the woods, eating through Neddie's skull. The crime compels Sis to force Mother, Father, and Savage Tom from the island in a rowboat. Guy, left on the island, and his Mother exchange calls of love over the water. Guy is soon sent off the island himself and into foster care.

Present-day Guy finishes painting the lighthouse, and encounters the ghost of Wendy, who tells him that Sis took over his Mother's place, to become just as tyrannical. She continued to harvest nectar from the orphans, and finally Wendy/Chance abandoned her and fled the island. This drove Sis to madness and to combusting in the lighthouse's lamp. Mother returns to the island, now blind, with the undead Father in tow. She attempts to restore her past regime, with Guy (her lone remaining child) her sole focus. Guy resists but life is less dramatic than before, until Father is murdered by sailors who were formerly orphans he victimized (they stuff him in a trash can and set him on fire). Mother soon readies to die, and Guy readies to catch her dying breath in a glass bottle. However, the ghost of Wendy/Chance distracts him and Mother dies furious with him for his inattention. Guy is left alone on the island, torn between the past and the future, contemplating suicide.

== Cast ==
- Gretchen Krich as Mother
- Cathleen O'Malley as Young Mother
- Susan Corzatte as Old Mother
- Sullivan Brown as Young Guy Maddin
- Erik Steffen Maahs as Older Guy Maddin
- Maya Lawson as Sis
- Jake Morgan-Scharhon as Chance Hale/Wendy Hale (credited as Katherine E. Scharhon)
- Todd Moore as Father
- Clayton Corzatte as Old Father
- Andrew Loviska as Savage Tom
- Kellan Larson as Neddie

== Release and reception ==
Brand Upon the Brain! premiered at the 2006 Toronto International Film Festival, where it was accompanied by a live orchestra, singer, an interlocutor (in the style of Japanese benshi), and Foley artists, Andy Malcolm, Goro Koyama and Caoimhe Doyle. The film was toured across North America in a similar fashion, with a host of celebrity narrators including Crispin Glover and John Ashbery. The film's normal theatrical run featured narration by Isabella Rossellini. At the New York Film Festival in October 2006, the film was narrated by Rossellini accompanied by the Sospeso Collective and Footsteps Studios Foley Troupe. Rossellini also narrated at the Berlin International Film Festival in February 2007, where the score was played by the Volkswagen Orchestra. All live orchestra performances were conducted by the score's composer, Jason Staczek.

Brand Upon the Brain! was released on DVD in 2008 by The Criterion Collection and features narration tracks by Rossellini, Glover, Ashbery, Laurie Anderson, Louis Negin, Eli Wallach, and Maddin himself.

Brand Upon the Brain! was well-received. On the review aggregator website Rotten Tomatoes, 91% of 57 critics' reviews are positive, with an average rating of 7.8/10. The website's consensus reads: "A bizarre, compelling spectacle that invests its absurd plot with heartfelt sincerety (sic), Brand Upon the Brain! is a unique cinematic experience." Metacritic, which uses a weighted average, assigned the film a score of 79 out of 100, based on 15 critics, indicating "generally favorable" reviews.

Roger Ebert described the film as "a phantasmagoric story that could be a collaboration between Edgar Allan Poe and Salvador Dalí", and wrote, of the film and Maddin's work in general, that "Maddin seems to penetrate to the hidden layers beneath the surface of the movies, revealing a surrealistic underworld of fears, fantasies and obsessions." Carrie Rickey emphasized the film's connection to the horror genre, calling it "a feverishly imaginative Freudian vampire film." Andrew Sarris, in the New York Observer, called the film "one of the most compelling avant-garde excursions into the narrative cinema ever."
