= Buffalo Gal Pictures =

- Industry: Canadian film and television
- Founded: 1994
- Founder: Phyllis Laing
- Headquarters: 440–112 Market Avenue, Winnipeg, MB R3B 0P4
- Key people: Phyllis Laing, President and Executive Producer
- Subsidiaries: Insidious Pictures; Kistikan Pictures Inc.
- Website: buffalogalpictures.com/

Buffalo Gal Pictures is an independent TV and film production company based in Winnipeg, Manitoba, Canada.

The company has produced 20 feature films, 10 television dramas, 8 documentaries, and over 50 hours of television series. In 2004, it premiered the Isabella Rossellini film The Saddest Music in the World at the Sundance Film Festival.

In 2013, Buffalo Gal Pictures produced Seances, a lost film project by Guy Maddin, in co-production with the National Film Board of Canada.

Its subsidiaries include Insidious Pictures, which focuses on horror; and Kistikan Pictures Inc., dedicated to Indigenous content for film and television, in partnership with actress Tina Keeper.

The company was named "Buffalo Gal" to represent Manitoba, as well as symbolizing the western with a feminine touch.

== Filmography ==
=== Television ===
- 2002. 2030 CE
- 2008–2013. Less Than Kind, seasons 1–4
- 2009–2014. Cashing In (Kistikan Pictures)
- 2014–2015. The Pinkertons
- 2015. Sunnyside

=== Film ===
- 2003. The Saddest Music in the World
- 2004. Seven Times Lucky
- 2005. Niagara Motel
- 2007. My Winnipeg
- 2007. The Stone Angel
- 2009. Amreeka
- 2009. High Life
- 2010. Locked Down
- 2010. How to Start Your Own Country
- 2011. The Year Dolly Parton Was My Mom
- 2012. ATM
- 2012. Mad Ship
- 2012. Silent Night (Insidious Pictures)
- 2013. All the Wrong Reasons
- 2014. Burt’s Buzz
- 2014. Aloft
- 2014. Heaven Is for Real
- 2015. The Forbidden Room
- 2015. Hyena Road
- 2015. Borealis
- 2016. Soul Sisters — documentary for VisionTV
- 2016. You're Killing Me Susana
- 2017. A Very Sordid Wedding
- 2018. JT LeRoy
- 2018. Night Hunter
- 2018. Siberia
- 2018. Trench 11
- 2018. Look Away
- 2018. Road of Iniquity (Kistikan Pictures)
- 2021. Seance
- 2023. Elevator Game

== Awards ==
Awards
Awards	Category	Recipient
Gemini Awards	Best Direction in a Comedy Program or Series	Less Than Kind
2009 Cannes Film Festival	Fipresci Prize	Amreeka
Toronto International Film Festival	Best Canadian Feature	My Winnipeg
Method Fest Independent Film Festival	Best Feature Best Screenplay	Seven Times Lucky
Genie Awards	Costumes, Editing & Music	Saddest Music in the World
Banff TV Festival	Rockie Award	Gabrielle Roy
