= Louis Negin =

Canadian actor (1929–2022)

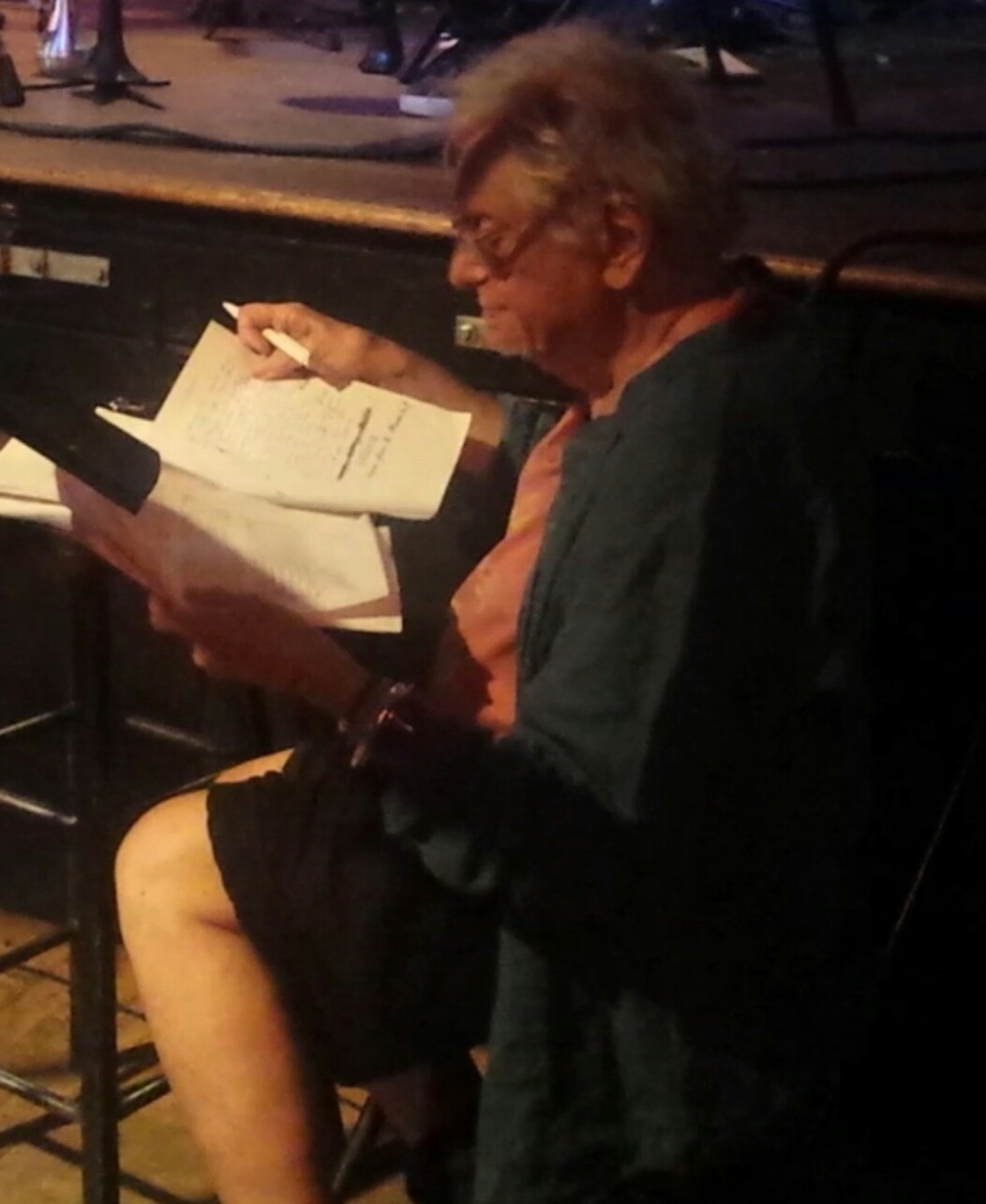
- Louis Negin photographed in Montréal, Québec, Canada at La Sala Rossa.
- Born: October 20, 1929; London, England
- Died: December 2, 2022 (aged 93); Montreal, Quebec
- Occupation: actor
- Years active: 1950s-2010s

Louis Negin (20 October 1929 – 2 December 2022) was a British-born Canadian actor, best known for his roles in the films of Guy Maddin.

== Career ==
Born in London, England, and raised in Toronto, Ontario, Negin had his earliest film and television roles in the 1950s Canadian dramatic anthology series First Performance, and as a chorus member in Tyrone Guthrie's 1957 film of the Stratford Festival production of Oedipus Rex. He appeared in the Stratford Festival production of Tamburlaine, which had a run on Broadway in 1956, and later appeared in London productions of Fortune and Men's Eyes and his own play Love and Maple Syrup; in Fortune and Men's Eyes, he became one of the first actors ever to appear fully nude on stage in England.

Negin later appeared in films including The Ernie Game, Can Heironymus Merkin Ever Forget Mercy Humppe and Find True Happiness?, Ooh… You Are Awful, Barry McKenzie Holds His Own, Rabid, Two Solitudes and Highpoint. As well as appearing in TV series such as Brett, Mousey and The Zoo Gang and episodes of King of Kensington and The Littlest Hobo. In the 1980s he had a recurring role on Seeing Things, as well as acting in the television films Overdrawn at the Memory Bank, Freddie the Freeloader's Christmas Dinner and Charlie Grant's War.

In 1994, he acted in drag as Mrs. White in a Toronto production of John Wimbs and Christopher Richards' play Molly Wood. In 1998, he played Noël Coward in a production of Linda Griffiths' play The Duchess at Theatre Passe Muraille. He played Truman Capote, both in a Toronto stage production of the play Tru in 1996 and in the film 54.

In later years, he acted in several of Guy Maddin's films, including Cowards Bend the Knee, Sissy Boy Slap Party, The Saddest Music in the World, Keyhole, and The Forbidden Room as well as narrating Maddin's semi-documentary films Brand Upon the Brain! and My Winnipeg. He also had guest roles in the television series Lord Have Mercy!, Mona the Vampire, ReGenesis and Slings and Arrows, and in Bruce McDonald's film Pontypool.

In 2008, he performed The Glass Eye, a semi-autobiographical play which he wrote in collaboration with Marie Brassard, in Montreal and Toronto.

In 2019, he appeared in Matthew Rankin's film The Twentieth Century, acting in drag as the mother of Prime Minister Mackenzie King. He received a Vancouver Film Critics Circle award nomination for Best Supporting Actor in a Canadian Film.

== Personal life and death ==
Negin, who was gay, was the partner of former television and film designer Charles Dunlop. In a 2007 interview with Xtra!, Negin described his age as "Write that I'm 95 years old, and that I've been to Hungary to have some work done."

Guy Maddin announced Negin's death on his Instagram on December 3, 2022. Negin had died the previous day, in Montreal, at the age of 93.

== Filmography ==
=== Films ===
Louis Negin film credits
Year	Title	Role	Notes
1967	The Ernie Game	Ernie's friend	
1969	Can Heironymus Merkin Ever Forget Mercy Humppe and Find True Happiness?	Producer Peter	
1972	Get Charlie Tully	Emilio Ferruchi	
1974	Barry McKenzie Holds His Own	Hugo Cretin	
1977	Rabid	Maxim	
1978	Two Solitudes	Cardinal's Canon	
1978	Blackout	Unknown	
1980	Deadline	Older Man	
1982	Highpoint	Dance Instructor	
1985	Big Deal	Eugene Leach	
1986	Keeping Track	Conductor	
1987	City of Shadows	Bamji	
1988	Last Man Standing	Cyril	
1989	Physical Evidence	Jake Farley	
1990	Love & Murder	Ginger	
1994	Sissy Boy Slap Party	Older Man	Short film
1998	54	Truman Capote	
1999	Eye of the Beholder	Bartender	
1999	The Devil's Arithmetic	Uncle Morris	
2002	Left Behind II: Tribulation Force	Witness Moishe	
2003	Cowards Bend the Knee	Dr. Fusi	
2003	The Saddest Music in the World	Blind Seer	
2006	Brand Upon the Brain!	Theatre tour narrator	
2007	My Winnipeg	Mayor Cornish	
2008	Pontypool	Conversationalist	
2011	Keyhole	Calypso / Camille	
2013	Gerontophilia	Crossing Guard	
2015	The Forbidden Room	Marv / Smithy / Mars /	
2019	The Twentieth Century	Mother (drag-role)	

=== Television ===
Louis Negin television credits
Year	Title	Role	Notes
1954-1960	Encounter	Bernie Altman	Episodes: "The Man Who Ran Away", "The Silent Partner" and "Apprenticeship of Duddy Kravitz"
1955	Folio	Unknown	Episode: "The Hand and the Mirror"
1957	First Performance	Unknown	Episode: "Seeds of Power" (credited as Louis Negan)
1957	Oedipus Rex	Chorus	TV movie (credited as Louis Negan)
1960	The Play of the Week	The Husband	Episode: "Two by Saroyan: 'Once Around the Block' and 'My Heart's in the Highlands'"
1961	The Man Born to Be King	Unknown	TV movie
1961-1966	Festival	Unknown	3 episodes
1963	Festival	First Komsomol	Episode: Ivan
1964	Twelfth Night	Unknown	TV movie
1964	Quest	Prisoner	Episode: "The Brig"
1968	Man in a Suitcase	Amin Hammoud	Episode: "The Revolutionaries"
1968	Mogul	First Official	Episode: "Not for My Friend - He's Driving"
1970	Vile Bodies	Archie Schwert	TV movie
1971	Brett	Zurkin	Episode: "The Hollow Men"
1974	The Zoo Gang	Claude	Episode: "Mindless Murder"
1974	Mousey	Couturier	TV movie
1975	On the Evidence	Unknown	Episode: "Murder: Regina Vs. Willis"
1976	Teleplay	Mouette	Episode: "The Italian Machine"
1976	The Wayne & Shuster Comedy Special	Unknown	Episodes: "Canadianization" and "Rinse the Blood Off My Toga"
1977	King of Kensington	Waiter	Episode: "The Comic"
1980-1982	The Littlest Hobo	Dr. McQuarter	Episodes: "The Pied Piper" and "Once Upon a Tyme"
1981	Standing Room Only	Louis - Maitre 'D	Episode: "Red Skelton's Christmas Dinner" (also known as Freddie the Freeloader's Christmas Dinner)
1981-1987	Seeing Things	Marlon	16 episodes
1983	A Matter of Cunning	Unknown	TV movie
1983	American Playhouse	Pierre	Episode: Overdrawn at the Memory Bank
1983	Cook & Peary: The Race to the Pole	Maitre D'	TV movie
1984	Charlie Grant's War	Otto Schmidt	TV movie
1985	In Like Flynn	Dr. Howe	TV movie
1986	Hot Shots	Goldsmith	Episode: "Tails You Lose"
1986	Philip Marlowe, Private Eye	Martin	Episode: "Red Wind"
1986-1987	Night Heat	Broffey	Episodes: "Every Picture Tells a Story" and "Limo"
1987	Check It Out	Maitre D'	Episode: "Love and Marriage"
1987	Adderly	Antoine	Episode: "A Matter of Discretion"
1987	Diamonds	Unknown	Episode: "Domestic Spirits"
1991	Tropical Heat	Mr. Charles / Jonathan	Episodes: "Hard Case" and "She"
1991	The Cutaway	Soap Opera Surgeon	TV movie
1993	Counterstrike	Art Appraiser	Episode: "French Twist"
1993	Class of '96	Professor Glick	Episode: "Midterm Madness"
1999-2000	Mona the Vampire	Reverend Gregory	15 episodes
2001	Queer as Folk	Older Gay Male #2	Episode: "Queens of the Road"
2003	Lord Have Mercy!	Father White	Episode: "Tangled Web"
2006	Slings and Arrows	Unknown	Episode: "Divided Kingdom"
2006	ReGenesis	Salvador Charringa	Episodes: "Our Men in Havana" and "Listen to Him"
