= My Winnipeg =

2007 Canadian film by Guy Maddin

- Directed by: Guy Maddin
- Written by: Guy Maddin; George Toles (dialogue)
- Produced by: Michael Burns; Phyllis Laing; Guy Maddin; Jody Shapiro
- Starring: Darcy Fehr; Ann Savage; Louis Negin; Amy Stewart; Brendan Cade; Wesley Cade
- Narrated by: Guy Maddin
- Cinematography: Jody Shapiro
- Edited by: John Gurdebeke
- Music by: Jason Staczek
- Production companies: Buffalo Gal Pictures; Documentary Channel; Everyday Pictures
- Distributed by: IFC Films
- Release dates: 7 September 2007 (Toronto Film Festival); 28 October 2008 (Canada)
- Running time: 80 minutes
- Country: Canada
- Language: English
- Budget: $500,000

My Winnipeg is a 2007 Canadian film directed and written by Guy Maddin with dialogue by George Toles. Described by Maddin as a "docu-fantasia", that melds "personal history, civic tragedy, and mystical hypothesizing", the film is a surrealist mockumentary about Winnipeg, Maddin's home town. A New York Times article described the film's unconventional take on the documentary style by noting that it "skates along an icy edge between dreams and lucidity, fact and fiction, cinema and psychotherapy".

My Winnipeg began when Maddin was commissioned by the Documentary Channel, and originally titled Love Me, Love My Winnipeg. Maddin's producer told him "Don't give me the frozen hellhole everyone knows that Winnipeg is" so Maddin cast Darcy Fehr in the role of "Guy Maddin" and structured the documentary around a metafictional plot that mythologizes the city and Maddin's autobiography.

== Plot ==
Although ostensibly a documentary, My Winnipeg contains a series of fictional episodes and an overall story trajectory concerning the author-narrator-character "Guy Maddin" and his desire to produce the film as a way to finally leave/escape the city of Winnipeg. "Guy Maddin" is played by Darcy Fehr but voiced by Maddin himself (in narration): Fehr appears groggily trying to rouse himself from sleep aboard a jostling train as Maddin wonders aloud "What if?" What if he were able to actually rouse from the sleepy life he lives in Winnipeg and escape? Maddin decides that the only possible escape would be to "film my way out", thus motivating the creation of the "docu-fantasia" already underway.

Maddin then describes Winnipeg in general terms, introducing it to the viewer, noting primarily its location at the junction of the Red and Assiniboine rivers, a place known as "the Forks". Maddin equates this Y-like junction to a woman's groin and associates it with his mother. Maddin also notes the apocryphal aboriginal myth of a secret "Forks beneath the Forks", an underground river system below the aboveground river system –the superimposition of these two sets of rivers has imbued the site and Winnipeg itself with magical/magnetic/sexual energy. Maddin also notes that Winnipeg is the geographical centre of North America, and thus these secret rivers are "the Heart of the Heart" of the continent and of Canada. Maddin regales the viewer with one of the film's many suspect historical "facts" about Winnipeg: "the Canadian Pacific Railway used to sponsor an annual treasure hunt [that] required our citizens to wander our city in a day-long combing of the streets and neighbourhoods. First prize was a one-way ticket on the next train out of town." No winners in a hundred years could bring themselves to leave the city after coming to know the city so closely over the course of the treasure hunt. Maddin then posits an alternative explanation for Winnipeggers never leaving Winnipeg: sleepiness. He notes that Winnipeg is the sleepwalking capital of the world, with ten times the normal rate of sleepwalking, and that everyone in Winnipeg carries around the keys to their former homes in case they return while asleep. Winnipeg by-laws require that sleepwalkers be allowed to sleep in their old homes by the new tenants.

Maddin rents his own childhood home at 800 Ellice Avenue for a month, hiring actors to play his family (including Ann Savage as his mother) in order to recreate scenes from his childhood memories, excluding his father and himself. The "family" gathers to watch the television show LedgeMan, a fictional drama in which "the same oversensitive man takes something said the wrong way, climbs out on a window ledge, and threatens to jump." His mother, in the next window, convinces him to live. Maddin's mother is noted as the star of the show. The film recounts the conditions of the 1919 Winnipeg General Strike, a real-world event with international significance, before returning to the family re-enactments, including Mother's suspicion of Janet Maddin, who hit a deer on the highway but is accused of covering up a sexual encounter. Maddin announces that this, like "everything that happens in [Winnipeg] is a euphemism." The film then recounts the city's history of Spiritualism, including a visit by Sir Arthur Conan Doyle in 1923. The film next examines Winnipeg architectural landmarks, including the Eaton's building and the Winnipeg Arena, both of which are demolished (while the arena is being destroyed, Maddin becomes the last person to urinate in its washroom). Maddin imagines the arena's salvation by the "Black Tuesdays", a fictional team of hockey heroes "in their 70s, 80s, 90s and beyond", then re-enacts a family scene where Mother is harassed to cook a meal.

The film recounts a racetrack fire that drove horses to perish in the Red River – the horse heads reappear, ghostly, each winter, frozen in the ice. Further Winnipeg landmarks, including the Golden Boy statue atop the provincial legislative building, the Paddle Wheel restaurant, the Hudson's Bay department store, and the Manitoba Sports Hall of Fame, make appearances in distorted versions of themselves, as does the Sherbrook Pool. The film then recalls If Day (an actual historical event when a faked Nazi invasion of the city was mounted during World War II to promote the sale of war bonds), and a buffalo stampede set off by the mating of two gay bison. Time is now running out for Guy Maddin, who fears he will never leave Winnipeg, since the family re-enactments have failed to free him fully. To accomplish this feat of leaving, Maddin imagines a pinup girl for the 1919 strike's newsletter The Citizen: dreaming up this "Citizen Girl" allows Maddin to leave Winnipeg, guilt-free. The final family re-enactment then involves Maddin's brother Cameron, who in real life committed suicide, rationalizing this death calmly in a discussion with Maddin's "Mother".

== Cast ==
- Ann Savage as Mother
- Louis Negin as Mayor Cornish
- Amy Stewart as Janet Maddin
- Darcy Fehr as Guy Maddin
- Brendan Cade as Cameron Maddin
- Wesley Cade as Ross Maddin
- Lou Profeta as Himself
- Fred Dunsmore as Himself
- Kate Yacula as Citizen Girl
- Jacelyn Lobay as Gweneth Lloyd
- Eric Nipp as Viscount Gort
- Jennifer Palichuk as Althea Cornish

== Release ==
A limited theatrical release of My Winnipeg involved live narrators, including Maddin himself, Udo Kier and "scream queen" Barbara Steele.

The DVD release of My Winnipeg by Seville Pictures, in addition to the feature film, contains a music video titled "Winnipeg" by Andy Smetanka (images) and Paul Copoe (music). The DVD also contains some documentary footage of the film's screening at the Royal Cinema in Toronto (on June 18, 2008), where it was narrated live by Maddin. The DVD also contains three of Maddin's short films: Spanky: To the Pier and Back, Berlin and Odin's Shield Maiden.

The Criterion Collection released the film on DVD and Blu-Ray in 2015.

=== Book adaptation ===
Maddin also released a book titled My Winnipeg (Coach House Books, 2009). Maddin's book contains the film's narration as a main text surrounded by annotations, including outtakes, marginal notes and digressions, production stills, family photos, and miscellaneous material. The book contains a "Winnipeg Map" by artist Marcel Dzama featuring such fictional attractions as "The Giant Squid of the Red [River]", various poster designs for the film, and short articles about working with Maddin by Andy Smetanka, Darcy Fehr, and Caelum Vatnsdal. Maddin also includes an angry e-mail from an ex-girlfriend, collages and notebooks pages, and an X-ray of the dog Spanky from the film. The book also includes an interview with Maddin's mother Herdis, conducted by Ann Savage, and an interview with Maddin conducted by Michael Ondaatje. Maddin's publisher offers the book with or without a DVD of the film, distributed by Seville Pictures.

== Critical reception ==
My Winnipeg received consistent critical praise. As of July 9, 2015, the review aggregator Rotten Tomatoes reported that 94% of critics gave the film positive reviews, based on 87 reviews. Metacritic reported "universal acclaim" based on 24 critics (scored 84 out of 100).

Roger Ebert gave the film a perfect 4/4 star rating, stating of Maddin's work generally that "If you love movies in the very sinews of your imagination, you should experience the work of Guy Maddin." Jonathan Romney began his review by stating that

This reviews section, you'll have noticed, operates a five-tier ratings system, but there are occasions when this just doesn't suffice. Once in a blue moon, you encounter a film so extraordinary that it's not enough to award the icon of a woman standing, hands raised in applause. You really need her to be levitating several feet above her armchair, body racked with the transcendental ecstasies of Saint Teresa. Such a film is My Winnipeg, by Canadian film-maker Guy Maddin.

The Hollywood Reporter stated that "'Docu-fantasia' is too mild a label for 'My Winnipeg,' Guy Maddin's simultaneously heartfelt and mocking ode to the hometown he describes as the coldest, most soporific city on Earth," also calling the film "Hilarious for those on Maddin's mad wavelength and more varied than his strictly fictional features." J. Hoberman called the film "Maddin's best filmmaking since the nono-dissimilar confessional bargain-basement phantasmagoia, Cowards Bend the Knee."

=== Top Ten lists ===
Roger Ebert named My Winnipeg the tenth best film of the decade.

The film appeared on several other critics' top ten lists of the best films of 2008.

- 3rd – Richard Corliss, Time
- 4th – Marc Savlov, The Austin Chronicle
- 5th – Rick Groen, The Globe and Mail
- 6th – Marjorie Baumgarten, The Austin Chronicle
- 7th – Liam Lacey, The Globe and Mail
- 10th – Noel Murray, The A.V. Club

In 2015, the Toronto International Film Festival placed My Winnipeg in the Top 10 Canadian Films of All Time.

=== Legacy ===
Guy Maddin's My Winnipeg by Darren Wershler

Darren Wershler, a Canadian avant-garde poet, critic, and assistant professor in the Department of English at Concordia University, has published an academic monograph on My Winnipeg. This book-length work, Guy Maddin's My Winnipeg (U of Toronto P, 2010), contextualizes the film in relation to avant-garde literature and art by drawing on media and cultural theory. In Wershler's words,

I argue that Maddin's use of techniques and media falls outside of the normal repertoire of contemporary cinema, which requires us to re-examine what we think we know about the documentary genre and even 'film' itself. Through an exploration of the film's major thematic concerns – memory, the cultural archive, and how people and objects circulate through the space of the city – I contend that My Winnipeg is intriguing because it is psychologically and affectively true without being historically accurate.

In the context of its Canadian production, My Winnipeg's difference from the documentary genre also marks the film as distinct from the work historically advanced by the National Film Board of Canada. Maddin has called My Winnipeg a "docu-fantasia" and Wershler similarly points out that the film's "truth" lies somewhere "in the irresolvable tension created by the gap between documentary and melodrama".

== Awards ==
- 2007: Toronto International Film Festival – Best Canadian Feature Film
- 2008: San Francisco Film Critics Circle Awards – Best Documentary
- 2008: Toronto Film Critics Association Awards – Best Canadian Film
- 2009: International Urban Film Festival, Tehran – Best Experimental Documentary
