= The Saddest Music in the World =

- Directed by: Guy Maddin
- Screenplay by: Guy Maddin; George Toles
- Based on: The Saddest Music in the World by Kazuo Ishiguro
- Produced by: Niv Fichman; Daniel Iron; Jody Shapiro
- Starring: Mark McKinney; Isabella Rossellini; Maria de Medeiros; David Fox; Ross McMillan
- Cinematography: Luc Montpellier
- Edited by: David Wharnsby
- Music by: Christopher Dedrick
- Distributed by: IFC Films
- Release date: September 7, 2003
- Running time: 99 minutes
- Country: Canada
- Language: English
- Budget: CAD $3.8 million (estimated)

The Saddest Music in the World is a 2003 Canadian film directed by Guy Maddin. Budgeted at $3.8-million and shot over 24 days, the film marks Maddin's first collaboration with actor Isabella Rossellini.

Maddin and co-screenwriter George Toles based the film on an original screenplay written by British novelist Kazuo Ishiguro, from which they kept "the title, the premise and the contest – to determine which country’s music was the saddest" but otherwise re-wrote. Like most of Guy Maddin's films, The Saddest Music in the World is filmed in a style that imitates late 1920s and early 1930s cinema, with grainy black-and-white photography, slightly out-of-sync sound and expressionist art design. A few scenes are filmed in colour, in a manner that imitates early two-strip Technicolor.

== Plot ==
During the Great Depression in 1933 in Winnipeg, Manitoba, Canada, beer baroness Lady Helen Port-Huntley announces a competition to find the saddest music in the world, as a publicity stunt to promote her company, Muskeg Beer, as Prohibition is about to end in the United States. The prize is $25,000 "Depression-era dollars" and musicians from all over the world pour into Winnipeg to compete. Chester Kent, a failing Broadway producer, decides to enter the contest representing America, even though he is Canadian and originally from Winnipeg. An old fortune teller predicts his doom, but Chester mocks this prediction by having his nymphomaniac amnesiac girlfriend Narcissa masturbate him. Also entering the contest are Chester's father Fyodor, representing Canada, and his brother Roderick, representing Serbia as "Gavrilo the Great" (even though he is also Canadian).

It is revealed that Fyodor is in love with Helen, who he had once hoped to marry. However, Helen and Chester had an affair, and an accident involving the three occurred when Fyodor stepped out in front of Chester's car as Helen was performing oral sex on Chester. Helen's legs were both amputated as a result, and Fyodor became an alcoholic, while Chester left for Broadway. With Chester returned, and his relationship with Helen renewed, Fyodor swears off drink and fashions prosthetic legs filled with beer in an attempt to earn Helen's love.

Roderick meanwhile discovers that Chester's girlfriend Narcissa is his missing wife, who has forgotten both their marriage and their son after the boy's death (Roderick carries the boy's heart in a jar, preserved in his own tears). Helen rigs the contest to favour Chester/America, and Fyodor/Canada quickly loses after singing "Red Maple Leaves," although Roderick/Serbia advances. Although Roderick and Narcissa have sex, she still doesn't remember their marriage, and he accidentally breaks the jar containing his son's heart (which is pierced by a glass shard), and although Helen loves her new glass beer legs, she still hates Fyodor. Fyodor then drinks a leg's worth of beer and falls through the concert hall rooftop to his death.

Helen appears in Chester's final performance, but her legs leak and explode when Roderick plays. Roderick then changes his tune to play "The Song Is You," which he had sworn not to perform until reunited with his wife. The song recovers Narcissa's memory and Chester, meanwhile, is stabbed to death by Helen (using a long shard from her glass legs). Chester refuses to let this sadden him, and staggers away, accidentally setting the building on fire with his victory cigar. Chester dies playing "The Song Is You" on the piano as the building burns.

== Cast ==
- Mark McKinney as Chester Kent
- Isabella Rossellini as Lady Helen Port-Huntley
- Maria de Medeiros as Narcissa
- David Fox as Fyodor Kent
- Ross McMillan as Roderick Kent / Gavrillo the Great
- Louis Negin as Blind Seer
- Darcy Fehr as Teddy
- Claude Dorge as Duncan Elksworth
- Talia Pura as Mary
- Jeff Sutton as Young Chester
- Graeme Valentin as Young Roderick
- Maggie Nagle as Chester's Mother

== Release ==
The Saddest Music in the World was released theatrically in Canada on September 7, 2003, to the UK on October 25, 2003, and to the US on February 14, 2004. MGM released it to home video on DVD on November 16, 2004. The DVD contains three short films: A Trip to the Orphanage, Sombra Dolorosa and Sissy Boy Slap Party.

== Awards and honors ==
Directors Guild of Canada:

- Win: Outstanding Achievement in Production Design, Feature Film - Matthew Davies
- Nominated: Outstanding Achievement in Direction, Feature Film - Guy Maddin
- Nominated: Outstanding Achievement in Picture Editing, Feature Film - David Wharnsby

Genie Awards

- Win: Best Achievement in Costume Design - Meg McMillan
- Win: Best Achievement in Editing - David Wharnsby
- Win: Best Achievement in Music, Original Score - Christopher Dedrick
- Nominated: Best Achievement in Direction - Guy Maddin

U.S. Comedy Arts Festival

- Win: Film Discovery Jury Award, Best Director - Guy Maddin

== Critical reception ==
The Saddest Music in the World was well received by critics. On review aggregator website Rotten Tomatoes, the film holds an approval rating of 79% based on 103 reviews, and an average rating of 7.1/10. The website's critical consensus reads, "Guy Maddin perfectly recreates the look and feel of a 1930s in this bizarre picture." On Metacritic, the film has a weighted average score of 78 out of 100, based on 33 critics, indicating "generally favorable reviews".

The Christian Science Monitor drew attention to "Maddin's unique style ... [which] carries old-movie nostalgia past the breaking point, making the picture look and sound like a long-ago production that's been stored under somebody's bed for the past few decades, and now reaches the screen replete with often-spliced frames and a fuzz-filled sound track. This is no mere gimmick but a core ingredient of Maddin's aesthetic, which bestows affection and regard on everything we overlook and undervalue in our daily lives."

Roger Ebert gave the film 3 1/2 out of 4 stars, calling it "entirely original" and noting that "You have never seen a film like this before, unless you have seen other films by Guy Maddin."
