= 2015 Toronto International Film Festival =

Annual Canadian film festival

Toronto International Film Festival
- Festival poster
- Opening film: Demolition
- Closing film: Mr. Right
- Location: Toronto, Ontario, Canada
- Founded: 1976
- Awards: Room (People's Choice Award)
- Festival date: 10–20 September 2015
- Website: web.archive.org/web/20150905123249/http://tiff.net/festivals/festival15

TIFF chronology
- 2016 2014

The 40th annual Toronto International Film Festival was held from 10 to 20 September 2015. On 28 July 2015 the first wave of films to be screened at the Festival was announced. Jean-Marc Vallée's Demolition starring Jake Gyllenhaal and Naomi Watts was the opening night film; Mr. Right by Paco Cabezas was the closing night film.

The year's edition included two new sections called Platform and Primetime. At Platform, twelve films will be screened in front of a jury, with the best film of the program winning the C$25,000 Platform Prize. Film directors Claire Denis, Jia Zhangke, and Agnieszka Holland were selected as the jurors for this section. At Primetime, six high-quality television programs will be presented at public screenings with Question and Answer sessions with show creators. The lineups for the TIFF Docs, Vanguard, Midnight Madness, and Masters sections were announced on 11 August 2015. More than 100 films were added to the festival's programme on 18 August. The new program titled In Conversation replaced the Maverick section.

The Festival reported that TIFF 2015 had a record high industry attendance, with 5,450 delegates from 80 countries, a 7% increase over 2014.

== Awards ==
The festival's final awards were announced on 20 September.

Award	Film	Director
People's Choice Award	Room	Lenny Abrahamson
People's Choice Award, First Runner Up	Angry Indian Goddesses	Pan Nalin
People's Choice Award, Second Runner Up	Spotlight	Tom McCarthy
People's Choice Award: Documentaries	Winter on Fire: Ukraine's Fight for Freedom	Evgeny Afineevsky
People's Choice Award: Documentaries, First Runner Up	This Changes Everything	Avi Lewis
People's Choice Award: Documentaries, Second Runner Up	Al Purdy Was Here	Brian D. Johnson
People's Choice Award: Midnight Madness	Hardcore Henry	Ilya Naishuller
People's Choice Award: Midnight Madness, First Runner Up	The Final Girls	Todd Strauss-Schulson
People's Choice Award: Midnight Madness, Second Runner Up	Green Room	Jeremy Saulnier
Platform Prize	Hurt	Alan Zweig
Best Canadian Feature Film	Closet Monster	Stephen Dunn
Best Canadian Short Film	Overpass	Patrice Laliberté
Best Canadian First Feature Film	Sleeping Giant	Andrew Cividino
Special Citation, Canadian Feature Film	My Internship in Canada	Philippe Falardeau
Dropbox Discovery Program Filmmakers Award	Black	Adil El Arbi and Bilall Fallah
FIPRESCI Discovery Prize	Eva Nová	Marko Skop
FIPRESCI Special Presentations	Desierto	Jonás Cuarón
Best International Short Film	Maman(s)	Maïmouna Doucouré
Netpac Award for World or International Asian Film Premiere	The Whispering Star	Sion Sono

=== Juries ===
Short film awards jury:

- Pascal Faure
- John Anderson
- Rizwan Manji

Canadian awards jury:

- Don McKellar
- Jacqueline Lyanga
- Ilda Santiago

FIPRESCI jury:

- Engin Ertan (president)
- Chris Alexander (film critic)
- Francisco Ferreira (film critic)
- Kerstin Gezelius
- Pierre Pageau
- Alissa Simon

NETPAC jury:

- Anne Misawa (chairperson)
- Heather Keung
- Nashen Moodley

Platform Prize jury (inaugural year):

- Jia Zhang-ke
- Claire Denis
- Agnieszka Holland

== Programme ==
=== Gala presentations ===
- Beeba Boys by Deepa Mehta
- Demolition by Jean-Marc Vallée
- Disorder by Alice Winocour
- The Dressmaker by Jocelyn Moorhouse
- Eye in the Sky by Gavin Hood
- Forsaken by Jon Cassar
- Freeheld by Peter Sollett
- Hyena Road by Paul Gross
- Lolo by Julie Delpy
- Legend by Brian Helgeland
- Man Down by Dito Montiel
- The Man Who Knew Infinity by Matt Brown (director)
- The Martian by Ridley Scott
- Miss You Already by Catherine Hardwicke
- Mississippi Grind by Ryan Fleck and Anna Boden
- Mr. Right by Paco Cabezas
- The Program by Stephen Frears
- Remember by Atom Egoyan
- Septembers of Shiraz by Wayne Blair
- Stonewall by Roland Emmerich

=== Special Presentations ===
- 45 Years by Andrew Haigh
- About Ray by Gaby Dellal
- Angry Indian Goddesses by Pan Nalin
- Anomalisa by Charlie Kaufman and Duke Johnson
- Beasts of No Nation by Cary Fukunaga
- Being Charlie by Rob Reiner
- Black Mass by Scott Cooper
- Body by Małgorzata Szumowska
- Born to Be Blue by Robert Budreau
- Brooklyn by John Crowley
- The Club by Pablo Larraín
- Colonia by Florian Gallenberger
- The Danish Girl by Tom Hooper
- The Daughter by Simon Stone
- Desierto by Jonás Cuarón
- Dheepan by Jacques Audiard
- Equals by Drake Doremus
- Families by Jean-Paul Rappeneau
- The Family Fang by Jason Bateman
- Guilty by Meghna Gulzar
- I Saw the Light by Marc Abraham
- I Smile Back by Adam Salky
- Into the Forest by Patricia Rozema
- The Idol by Hany Abu-Assad
- The Lady in the Van by Nicholas Hytner
- Len and Company by Tim Godsall
- The Lobster by Yorgos Lanthimos
- Louder Than Bombs by Joachim Trier
- Ma Ma by Julio Medem
- Maggie's Plan by Rebecca Miller
- Mia Madre by Nanni Moretti
- The Meddler by Lorene Scafaria
- Mountains May Depart by Jia Zhang-ke
- Mr. Six by Guan Hu
- Mustang by Deniz Gamze Ergüven
- Office by Johnnie To
- Our Brand Is Crisis by David Gordon Green
- Parched by Leena Yadav
- Room by Lenny Abrahamson
- Sicario by Denis Villeneuve
- Son of Saul by László Nemes
- Spotlight by Tom McCarthy
- Summertime by Catherine Corsini
- Sunset Song by Terence Davies
- A Tale of Love and Darkness by Natalie Portman
- A Tale of Three Cities by Mabel Cheung
- Trumbo by Jay Roach
- Truth by James Vanderbilt
- Un plus une by Claude Lelouch
- Victoria by Sebastian Schipper
- Ville-Marie by Guy Édoin
- The Wave by Roar Uthaug
- Where to Invade Next by Michael Moore
- The Witch by Robert Eggers
- Youth by Paolo Sorrentino

=== Vanguard ===
- Collective Invention by Kwon Oh-kwang
- Demon by Marcin Wrona
- Endorphine by André Turpin
- Evolution by Lucile Hadžihalilović
- February by Oz Perkins
- Hellions by Bruce McDonald
- Lace Crater by Harrison Atkins
- Love by Gaspar Noé
- Men & Chicken by Anders Thomas Jensen
- The Missing Girl by A.D. Calvo
- My Big Night by Álex de la Iglesia
- The Nightmare by Achim Bornhak
- No Men Beyond This Point by Mark Sawers
- Veteran by Ryoo Seung-wan
- Zoom by Pedro Morelli

=== TIFF Docs ===
- Al Purdy Was Here by Brian D. Johnson
- A Flickering Truth by Pietra Brettkelly
- Being AP by Anthony Wonke
- Bolshoi Babylon by Nick Read
- Dark Horse by Louise Osmond
- Guantanamo's Child: Omar Khadr by Patrick Reed, Michelle Shephard
- He Named Me Malala by Davis Guggenheim
- Heart of a Dog by Laurie Anderson
- Hitchcock/Truffaut by Kent Jones
- Horizon by Bergur Bernburg, Friðrik Þór Friðriksson
- In Jackson Heights by Frederick Wiseman
- It All Started at the End by Luis Ospina
- Janis: Little Girl Blue by Amy J. Berg
- Je suis Charlie by Emmanuel Leconte, Daniel Leconte
- A Journey of a Thousand Miles: Peacekeepers by Geeta Gandbhir, Sharmeen Obaid-Chinoy
- Miss Sharon Jones! by Barbara Kopple
- The Music of Strangers: Yo-Yo Ma and the Silk Road Ensemble by Morgan Neville
- Nasser by Jihan El-Tahri
- Ninth Floor by Mina Shum
- Our Last Tango by German Kral
- P.S. Jerusalem by Danae Elon
- The Reflektor Tapes by Kahlil Joseph
- Return of the Atom by Mika Taanila, Jussi Eerola
- Sherpa by Jennifer Peedom
- This Changes Everything by Avi Lewis
- Thru You Princess by Ido Haar
- Welcome to F.L. by Geneviève Dulude-De Celles
- Winter on Fire: Ukraine's Fight for Freedom by Evgeny Afineevsky
- Women He's Undressed by Gillian Armstrong
- A Young Patriot by Du Haibin

=== Short Cuts Canada ===
- 4 Quarters by Ashley McKenzie
- Bacon and God's Wrath by Sol Friedman
- The Ballad of Immortal Joe by Héctor Herrera
- BAM by Howie Shia
- Benjamin by Sherren Lee
- Beyond the Horizon by Brian J. Noth
- Boxing by Grayson Moore and Aidan Shipley
- Boy by Connor Jessup
- Bring Me the Head of Tim Horton by Guy Maddin, Evan Johnson and Galen Johnson
- Casualties of Modernity by Kent Monkman
- Clouds of Autumn by Trevor Mack and Matthew Taylor Blais
- Dogs Don't Breed Cats (Les chiens ne font pas des chats) by Cristina Martins
- Dredger by Phillip Barker
- The Guy from New York by Jean-François Leblanc
- It's Not You by Don McKellar
- Komkom by Kevin Papatie
- A New Year by Marie-Ève Juste
- Nina by Halima Elkhatabi
- O Negative by Steven McCarthy

=== Wavelengths ===
- 88:88 by Isiah Medina
- Afternoon by Tsai Ming-liang
- Arabian Nights: The Restless One by Miguel Gomes
- Arabian Nights: The Desolate One by Miguel Gomes
- Arabian Nights: The Enchanted One by Miguel Gomes
- Bunte Kuh by Ryan Ferko, Parastoo Anoushahpour and Faraz Anoushahpour
- Eva Doesn't Sleep by Pablo Agüero
- The Event by Sergei Loznitsa
- Engram of Returning by Daïchi Saïto
- The Forbidden Room by Guy Maddin and Evan Johnson
- Fugue by Kerstin Schroedinger
- Invention by Mark Lewis
- La Giubba by Corin Sworn and Tony Romano
- No Home Movie by Chantal Akerman
- The Other Side by Roberto Minervini
- The Sky Trembles and the Earth is Afraid and the Two Eyes Are Not Brothers by Ben Rivers

=== Discovery ===
- A Patch of Fog by Michael Lennox
- The Ardennes by Robin Pront
- Beast by Tom McKeith and Sam McKeith
- Black by Adil El Arbi and Bilall Fallah
- Born to Dance by Tammy Davis
- Closet Monster by Stephen Dunn
- Dégradé by Tarzan and Arab Nasser
- Desde allá by Lorenzo Vigas
- Downriver by Grant Scicluna
- Eva Nová by Marko Škop
- Fire Song by Adam Garnet Jones
- Five Nights in Maine by Maris Curran
- The Here After by Magnus von Horn
- Ixcanul by Jayro Bustamante
- James White by Josh Mond
- Keeper by Guillaume Senez
- Les Cowboys by Thomas Bidegain
- Meghmallar by Zahidur Rahim Anjan
- Mountain by Yaelle Kayam
- My Name Is Emily by Simon Fitzmaurice
- The Paradise Suite by Joost van Ginkel
- The Rainbow Kid by Kire Paputts
- River by Jamie M. Dagg
- Semana Santa by Alejandra Márquez Abella
- Sleeping Giant by Andrew Cividino
- Spear by Stephen Page
- Very Big Shot by Mir-Jean Bou Chaaya
- The Wait by Piero Messina
- We Monsters by Sebastian Ko
- Wedding Doll by Nitzan Gilady

=== Contemporary World Cinema ===
- 25 April by Leanne Pooley
- 3000 Nights by Mai Masri
- An by Naomi Kawase
- The Apostate by Federico Veiroj
- As I Open My Eyes by Leyla Bouzid
- Baba Joon by Yuval Delshad
- Box by Florin Șerban
- Campo Grande by Sandra Kogut
- Chevalier by Athina Rachel Tsangari
- A Copy of My Mind by Joko Anwar
- Cuckold by Charlie Vundla
- Embrace of the Serpent by Ciro Guerra
- The Endless River by Oliver Hermanus
- The Fear by Damien Odoul
- Frenzy by Emin Alper
- Girls Lost by Alexandra-Therese Keining
- Granny's Dancing on the Table by Hanna Sköld
- A Heavy Heart by Thomas Stuber
- Homesick by Anne Sewitsky
- Hong Kong Trilogy: Preschooled Preoccupied Preposterous by Christopher Doyle
- Honor Thy Father by Erik Matti
- How Heavy This Hammer by Kazik Radwanski
- Invisible by Lawrence Fajardo
- In the Room by Eric Khoo
- Incident Light by Ariel Rotter
- I Promise You Anarchy by Julio Hernández Cordón
- Ivy by Tolga Karaçelik
- Jack by Elisabeth Scharang
- Journey to the Shore by Kiyoshi Kurosawa
- The Kind Words by Shemi Zarhin
- Koza by Ivan Ostrochovský
- Lamb by Yared Zeleke
- Last Cab to Darwin by Jeremy Sims
- Let Them Come by Salem Brahimi
- Magallanes by Salvador del Solar
- Mekko by Sterlin Harjo
- Much Loved by Nabil Ayouch
- Murmur of the Hearts by Sylvia Chang
- My Internship in Canada by Philippe Falardeau
- One Breath by Christian Zübert
- One Floor Below by Radu Muntean
- Our Loved Ones by Anne Émond
- Parisienne by Danielle Arbid
- Paths of the Soul by Zhang Yang
- The People vs. Fritz Bauer by Lars Kraume
- Price of Love by Hermon Hailay
- Rams by Grímur Hákonarson
- Schneider vs. Bax by Alex van Warmerdam
- Song of Songs by Eva Neymann
- Sparrows by Runar Rúnarsson
- Starve Your Dog by Hicham Lasri
- The Steps by Andrew Currie
- Story of Judas by Rabah Ameur-Zaïmeche
- Stranger by Ermek Tursunov
- Thank You for Bombing by Barbara Eder
- The Treasure by Corneliu Porumboiu
- Truman by Cesc Gay
- The Waiting Room by Igor Drljaca
- The Whispering Star by Sion Sono

=== Midnight Madness ===
- Baskin by Can Evrenol
- The Chickening by Davy Force and Nick DenBoer
- The Devil's Candy by Sean Byrne
- The Final Girls by Todd Strauss-Schulson
- The Girl in the Photographs by Nick Simon
- Green Room by Jeremy Saulnier
- Hardcore by Ilya Naishuller
- The Mind's Eye by Joe Begos
- Southbound by Radio Silence, Roxanne Benjamin, David Bruckner & Patrick Horvath
- SPL II: A Time For Consequences by Soi Cheang
- Yakuza Apocalypse by Takashi Miike

=== Masters ===
- 11 Minutes by Jerzy Skolimowski
- The Assassin by Hou Hsiao-hsien
- Bleak Street by Arturo Ripstein
- Blood of My Blood by Marco Bellocchio
- Cemetery of Splendour by Apichatpong Weerasethakul
- Every Thing Will Be Fine by Wim Wenders
- Francofonia by Alexander Sokurov
- In the Shadow of Women by Philippe Garrel
- Our Little Sister by Hirokazu Kore-eda
- The Pearl Button by Patricio Guzmán
- Rabin, the Last Day by Amos Gitai
- Right Now, Wrong Then by Hong Sang-soo
- Taxi by Jafar Panahi

=== City to City: London ===
- Couple in a Hole by Tom Geens
- The Hard Stop by George Amponsah
- Kill Your Friends by Owen Harris
- Kilo Two Bravo by Paul Katis
- London Road by Rufus Norris
- Northern Soul by Elaine Constantine
- The Ones Below by David Farr
- Urban Hymn by Michael Caton-Jones

=== Cinematheque ===
- Heat by Michael Mann

=== TIFF Kids ===
- The Boy and the Beast by Mamoru Hosoda
- The Iron Giant: Signature Edition by Brad Bird
- My Skinny Sister by Sanna Lenken
- Phantom Boy by Alain Gagnol and Jean-Loup Felicioli

=== Platform ===
- Bang Gang (A Modern Love Story) by Eva Husson
- The Clan by Pablo Trapero
- French Blood by Diastème
- Full Contact by David Verbeek
- High-Rise by Ben Wheatley
- Hurt by Alan Zweig
- Land of Mine by Martin Zandvliet
- Looking for Grace by Sue Brooks
- Neon Bull by Gabriel Mascaro
- The Promised Land by He Ping
- Sky by Fabienne Berthaud
- The White Knights by Joachim Lafosse

=== Primetime ===
- Casual by Zander Lehmann
- Heroes Reborn by Tim Kring
- Cromo by Lucía Puenzo and Nicolás Puenzo
- Keith Richards: Under the Influence by Morgan Neville
- The Returned by Fabrice Gobert
- Trapped by Baltasar Kormákur

== Canada's Top Ten ==
In December, TIFF programmers released their annual Canada's Top Ten list of the films selected as the ten best Canadian films of 2015. The selected films received a follow-up screening at the TIFF Bell Lightbox as a "Canada's Top Ten" minifestival in January 2016, as well as in selected other cities including Ottawa, Montreal and Halifax.

=== Features ===
- Closet Monster, Stephen Dunn
- The Demons, Philippe Lesage
- The Forbidden Room, Guy Maddin and Evan Johnson
- Guantanamo's Child: Omar Khadr, Patrick Reed and Michelle Shephard
- Hurt, Alan Zweig
- Into the Forest, Patricia Rozema
- My Internship in Canada, Philippe Falardeau
- Ninth Floor, Mina Shum
- Our Loved Ones, Anne Émond
- Sleeping Giant, Andrew Cividino

=== Shorts ===
- Bacon & God's Wrath, Sol Friedman
- Balmoral Hotel, Wayne Wapeemukwa
- Bring Me the Head of Tim Horton, Guy Maddin, Evan Johnson and Galen Johnson
- Interview with a Free Man (Entrevue avec un homme libre), Nicolas Lévesque
- The Little Deputy, Trevor Anderson
- My Enemy, My Brother, Ann Shin
- Never Steady, Never Still, Kathleen Hepburn
- Nina, Halima Elkhatabi
- O Negative, Steven McCarthy
- Overpass (Viaduc), Patrice Laliberté
