= Mutum =

Mutum may refer to:

- Mutum (band), a Brazilian band
- Mutum (film) (2007), a Brazilian film directed by Sandra Kogut, based on the novel Campo Geral (1964) by João Guimarães Rosa
- Mutum, Minas Gerais, a city in the Brazilian state of Minas Gerais
- Mutum, one of the family names in the Indian state of Manipur
- Red-knobbed curassow, a Brazilian bird

== See also ==
- Mutum River (disambiguation)
