= Slimane Dazi =

French actor

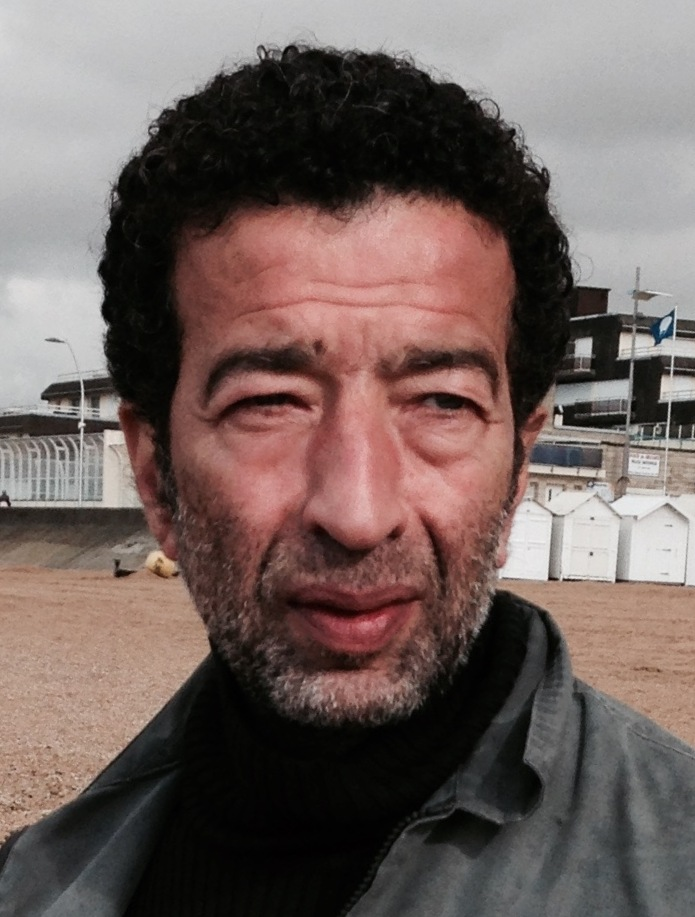
- Dazi in 2015
- Born: Nanterre, France
- Occupation: Actor
- Years active: 2007–present

Slimane Dazi is a French actor.

Born in Nanterre, he is of Algerian-Berber descent.

== Filmography ==
| Year | Title | Role | Director | Notes |
|---|---|---|---|---|
| 2007 | Gourgou | Ferryman | Sacha Chelli | Short |
| 2007 | La commune | Lakhdar Sarida | Philippe Triboit | TV series (1 episode) |
| 2008 | Sur le fil | Hichem Mokatoui | Frédéric Berthe | TV series (1 episode) |
| 2009 | A Prophet | Lattrache | Jacques Audiard | |
| 2010 | De l'encre | Areski | Ekoué & Hamé | TV movie |
| 2010 | La dernière valse | Salah | Sacha Chelli (2) | Short |
| 2011 | Free Men | Larbi | Ismaël Ferroukhi | |
| 2011 | Rabat | Dade Exporter | Victor Ponten & Jim Taihuttu | |
| 2011 | De force | Farid Boujima | Frank Henry | |
| 2011 | Et Dieu tua la Femme | | Sacha Chelli (3) | Short |
| 2012 | Ce chemin devant moi | The tug | Hamé (2) | Short |
| 2012 | Hold Back | Slimane | Rachid Djaidani | |
| 2012 | Je ne suis pas mort | Brahim | Mehdi Ben Attia | |
| 2013 | Si proche des miens | Nabil's father | Baptiste Debraux | Short |
| 2013 | Only Lovers Left Alive | Bilal | Jim Jarmusch | |
| 2013 | J'mange pas de porc | | Mohamed Belhamar & Akim Isker | Short |
| 2013 | Wolf | Weapon trader | Jim Taihuttu (2) | |
| 2013 | Fièvres | Karim Zeroubi | Hicham Ayouch | Marrakech International Film Festival - Best Actor |
| 2014 | Vos violences | The cop | Antoine Raimbault | Short |
| 2014 | 96 hours | Abdel Koudri | Frédéric Schoendoerffer | |
| 2014 | Totems | Majid | Sarah Arnold | Short |
| 2015 | The Forbidden Room | Baron Pappenheim | Guy Maddin & Evan Johnson | |
| 2015 | Dans l'ombre d'une guerre: Une histoire secrète du conflit franco-algérien | Mohamed Khider | Sallah Laddi | |
| 2015 | The Bureau | General Lefkir | Mathieu Demy and Laïla Marrakchi | TV series (season 1) |
| 2015 | Seances | | Guy Maddin (2) | |
| 2015 | Orage | Hakim | Fabrice Camoin | |
| 2015 | Home Suite Home | Receptionist | Jeroen Houben | Short |
| 2015 | Full Contact | Al Zaim | David Verbeek | |
| 2017 | The Nile Hilton Incident | "Green Eyed Man" | Tarik Saleh | |
| 2017 | Above the Law | Prison officer | François Troukens, Jean-François Hensgens | |
| 2019 | South Terminal | | | |
| 2022 | For My Country | Brahim | Rachid Hami | |
