= Accidence (film) =

2018 Canadian short film

- Directed by: Guy Maddin; Evan Johnson; Galen Johnson
- Written by: Guy Maddin; Evan Johnson; Galen Johnson
- Produced by: Juliette Hagopian
- Cinematography: Lianed Marcoleta; Ryan Simmons
- Edited by: Evan Johnson; Galen Johnson
- Music by: Ensign Broderick
- Production company: JuliJette
- Distributed by: Six Shooter Pictures
- Release date: February 19, 2018 (Berlin)
- Running time: 9 minutes
- Country: Canada
- Language: English

Accidence is a Canadian short drama film, directed by Guy Maddin, Evan Johnson and Galen Johnson, and released in 2018. The film, a continuous nine-minute shot, focuses on an apartment block and depicts the diverse events, both major and minor, taking place on balconies.

The film premiered at the 2018 Berlin Film Festival, as an accompaniment to a screening of his 2017 feature film The Green Fog. It had its North American premiere at the 2018 Toronto International Film Festival.

The film was named to TIFF's annual year-end Canada's Top Ten list for 2018.
