= Picture Day (film) =

- Official Poster
- Directed by: Kate Melville
- Written by: Kate Melville
- Produced by: Daniel Iron; Lauren Grant; Peter Harvey; Kate Melville; Aeschylus Poulos
- Starring: Tatiana Maslany; Spencer Van Wyck; Steven McCarthy; Susan Coyne; Fiona Highet; Catherine Fitch; Mark DeBonis
- Cinematography: Celiana Cárdenas
- Edited by: Dev Singh
- Music by: Danielle Holke
- Production companies: Foundry Films; Snitch Pictures
- Distributed by: Mongrel Media
- Release date: 7 September 2012 (TIFF)
- Running time: 94 minutes
- Country: Canada
- Language: English

Picture Day is a Canadian teen comedy-drama film written, directed and co-produced by Kate Melville. The film stars Tatiana Maslany, Spencer Van Wyck, Steven McCarthy, and Susan Coyne. The film had its world premiere at the 2012 Toronto International Film Festival on September 7, 2012.

== Plot ==
Claire (Tatiana Maslany) is a rebellious Toronto teen forced to repeat her senior year of high school due to her dysfunctional attitude towards academics, picks fights with other girls and indulges in sexual promiscuity with student Henry (Spencer Van Wyck) and a much older indie rocker Jim (Steven McCarthy) and pathologically slacks off on her job at a bingo hall serving senior citizens.

== Cast ==
- Tatiana Maslany as Claire
- Spencer Van Wyck as Henry
  - Troy Lebane as Young Henry
- Fiona Highet as Annie
- Steven McCarthy as Jim
- Susan Coyne as Ruth
- Fiona Highet as Annie
- Catherine Finch as Vice Principal
- Mark DeBonis as Lewis

== Production ==
The film was shot in the fall of 2011 in downtown Toronto, Ontario.

== Release ==
The film had its world premiere at the Toronto International Film Festival on September 7, 2012. The film had its United States premiere at the RiverRun Film Festival on April 14, 2013. The film was released on May 24, 2013, in Canada by Mongrel Media and on May 21, 2013, in the United States by Ketchup Entertainment.

The film was released straight to video in the United States on May 21, 2013, by Ketchup Entertainment, and in a limited release in Canada on May 24, 2013.

== Reception ==
=== Critical response ===
On the review aggregator website Rotten Tomatoes, 80% of 5 critics' reviews are positive, with an average rating of 6.3/10.

=== Awards and nominations ===
Award	Category	Recipient	Result
Hamptons International Film Festival	Breakthrough Performer (2013)	Tatiana Maslany	Won
RiverRun International Film Festival	Audience Choice Award (The Kilpatrick Townsend & Stockton LLP Audience Award for Best Narrative Feature)	Kate Melville	Won
ACTRA Awards	Outstanding Performance - Female (2013)	Tatiana Maslany	Won
Whistler Film Festival	Borsos Award for Best Canadian Feature (2012)	Kate Melville	Won
Whistler Film Festival	Borsos Award for Best Performance in a Borsos Competition Film (2012)	Tatiana Maslany	Won
WGC Canadian Screenwriting Awards	Movies and Miniseries (2013)	Kate Melville	Nominated
Canadian Cinema Editors Awards	Best Editing in a Feature Length (2012)	Dev Singh	Nominated
