= Story of Judas =

2015 film

- Theatrical release poster
- Directed by: Rabah Ameur-Zaïmeche
- Written by: Rabah Ameur-Zaïmeche
- Starring: Nabil Djedouani
- Cinematography: Irina Lubtchansky
- Edited by: Grégoire Pontécaille; Marie Loustalot
- Music by: Rodolphe Burger
- Release dates: 6 February 2015 (Berlin); 8 April 2015 (France)
- Running time: 99 minutes
- Country: France
- Language: French

Story of Judas (French: Histoire de Judas) is a 2015 French drama film directed by Rabah Ameur-Zaïmeche. It was screened in the Contemporary World Cinema section of the 2015 Toronto International Film Festival.

== Cast ==
- Nabil Djedouani as Jesus
- Mohamed Aroussi as Carabas
- Rabah Ameur-Zaïmeche as Judas Iscariot
- Marie Loustalot as Bathsheba
- Patricia Malvoisin as Susanna
- Nouari Nezzar as Caiaphas
- Eliott Khayat as the scribe
- Régis Laroche as Pontius Pilate
- Xavier Mussel as Menenius
