= Mutum River =

There are several rivers named Mutum River.

== Brazil ==
- Mutum River (Amapá)
- Mutum River (Amazonas)
- Mutum River (Espírito Santo)
- Mutum River (Mato Grosso)

== See also ==
- Mutum (disambiguation)
