= Je suis Charlie (film) =

2015 film

- Film poster
- Directed by: Emmanuel Leconte; Daniel Leconte
- Written by: Emmanuel Leconte; Daniel Leconte
- Produced by: Daniel Leconte
- Cinematography: Damien Girault; Pierre Isnardon; Edouard Kruch
- Edited by: Grégoire Chevalier-Naud
- Release dates: 13 September 2015 (TIFF); 16 December 2015 (France)
- Country: France
- Language: French

Je suis Charlie (original title: L'humour à mort) is a 2015 French documentary film directed by Emmanuel Leconte and Daniel Leconte about the 2015 Île-de-France attacks. It was shown in the TIFF Docs section of the 2015 Toronto International Film Festival.

The documentary has been nominated for the F:ACT Award at the 2015 Copenhagen International Documentary Festival and for Best Documentary at the 2016 Jerusalem Film Festival.
