= Stump the Guesser =

2020 Canadian film

- Film poster
- Directed by: Guy Maddin; Evan Johnson; Galen Johnson
- Written by: Guy Maddin; Evan Johnson; Galen Johnson
- Produced by: Juliette Hagopian
- Starring: Adam Brooks; Brent Neale; Stephanie Berrington
- Cinematography: Ryan Simmons
- Edited by: Evan Johnson; Galen Johnson
- Production company: Julijette
- Release date: February 25, 2020 (Berlinale)
- Running time: 19 minutes
- Country: Canada
- Language: English

Stump the Guesser is a Canadian short film by Guy Maddin, Evan Johnson and Galen Johnson, which was released in 2020. A silent black-and-white film based on early Soviet cinema tropes, it stars Adam Brooks as a man who works as a guesser at the fair, but whose mindreading tricks suddenly begin to fail him; simultaneously, he meets a long-lost sister he never knew he had and falls in love with her, and sets out to disprove the theory of heredity in hopes of being able to marry her.

The film premiered on February 25, 2020, at the 70th Berlin International Film Festival.

The film was named to the Toronto International Film Festival's year-end Canada's Top Ten list for short films in 2020.
