= The Forbidden Room (2015 film) =

- Directed by: Guy Maddin; Co-director: Evan Johnson
- Written by: Evan Johnson; Robert Kotyk; Guy Maddin; Additional material: John Ashbery; Story editor: Kim Morgan
- Produced by: David Christensen
- Starring: Roy Dupuis; Clara Furey; Jacques Nolot; Ariane Labed; Charlotte Rampling; Mathieu Amalric; Udo Kier; Maria de Medeiros; Sparks; Adèle Haenel; Gregory Hlady; Louis Negin; Karine Vanasse; Geraldine Chaplin
- Cinematography: Benjamin Kasulke; Stéphanie Weber Biron
- Edited by: John Gurdebeke
- Music by: Galen Johnson; Guy Maddin; Jason Staczek
- Production companies: Buffalo Gals Pictures; Phi; National Film Board of Canada
- Distributed by: Mongrel Media (Canada); Phi (Canada); Kino Lorber (United States)
- Release dates: 26 January 2015 (Sundance); 9 October 2015 (Canada)
- Running time: 119 minutes
- Country: Canada
- Language: English
- Box office: $34,404

The Forbidden Room is a 2015 Canadian experimental fantasy drama film co-directed by Guy Maddin and Evan Johnson (being latter's feature directorial debut), and written by Maddin, Johnson, and Robert Kotyk. The film stars Roy Dupuis, Clara Furey, Louis Negin, Jacques Nolot, Charlotte Rampling, Udo Kier, Gregory Hlady, Sparks, Karine Vanasse, Adele Haenel, Mathieu Amalric, Maria de Medeiros and Geraldine Chaplin.

== Plot ==
The film's frame story, and the narrative it returns to the most, concerns a submarine crew transporting a volatile substance that will explode if they ever resurface. As the crew struggle to survive with low oxygen levels, a woodsman (Roy Dupuis) mysteriously forces his way onto the vessel; the crew believe his sudden appearance may lead to an escape from their predicament. The men navigate a labyrinth of rooms and passageways while trying to access the captain's chamber. Along the way, they recount stories that lead to other stories, which unfold in a complex and layered manner. The most important of these "sub-stories" shows the woodsman and his fellow "sapling-jacks" trying to rescue a woman named Margot from depraved kidnappers. Other sub-stories involve: a surgeon kidnapped by a team of "women skeletons" who work as insurance defrauders; a madman on a train under the charge of a womanizing psychiatrist; a mustache that seeks to comfort the widow of the man whose face it used to adorn; and a doctor cursed by a bust of Janus. The submarine crew finally reach the captain's "forbidden room", only to find him incapacitated. Most of the men die of asphyxiation, but the woodsman finds that the volatile cargo has transformed into his love, Margot. A passionate kiss leads into a montage of proposed endings from "The Book of Climaxes", and an abrupt, inconclusive ending to the film itself.

== Cast ==
- Roy Dupuis as Cesare
- Clara Furey as Margot
- Louis Negin as Marv / Smithy / Mars / Organizer / Mr. Lanyon
- Udo Kier as Count Yugh / The Butler / The Dead Father / Guard / Pharmacist
- Karine Vanasse as Florence Labadie
- Gregory Hlady as Jarvis / Dr. Deane / A Husband
- Mathieu Amalric as Thadeusz M____ / Ostler
- Noel Burton as Wolf / Pilot / The Captain
- Geraldine Chaplin as The Master Passion / Nursemaid / Aunt Chance
- Paul Ahmarani as Dr. Deng / Speedy
- Caroline Dhavernas as Gong
- Jacques Nolot as Bent / Minister of the Interior
- Maria de Medeiros as The Blind Mother / Clotilde
- Charlotte Rampling as The Ostler's Mother
- Victor Andrés Trelles Turgeon as Pancho
- Sparks as the Voices of the Faceless Crooner
  - Russell Mael provides the primary voice, Ron Mael provides additional voices.
- Sophie Desmarais as Jane Lanyon
- Ariane Labed as Alicia Warlock / The Chambermaid
- Slimane Dazi as Baron Pappenheim
- André Wilms as Surgeon
- Adèle Haenel as The Mute Invalid
- Céline Bonnier as Eve
- Lewis Furey as The Skull-Faced Man
- Amira Casar as Mrs. M____
- Jean-François Stévenin as The Doctor
- Kim Morgan as Kim
- Marie Brassard as Mysterious Necklace Woman
- John Churchill as Karl Le Barron
- Arthur Holden as Auctioneer
- Anthony Lemke as Bud
- Elina Löwensohn as Sister
- Darcy Fehr as Nightclub Attendee / Climax Player

== Production ==
=== Writing ===
Many of the stories within the film's nesting doll structure were inspired by a lost film and then reimagined in an absurdist way, sometimes based only on the title. When asked how the idea for the structure came about, Johnson said he is a fan of Raymond Roussel.

=== Filming and editing ===
The film was shot on digital in public studios (where the public could visit and attend the film shoots) at the Centre Georges Pompidou in Paris, France and the Centre PHI in Montreal, Quebec, Canada.

There was so much material that did not make the final cut that the directors decided to turn it into a web series, called Seances, which Maddin calls a "companion piece" to the film. The final cut of the film is slightly shorter than it was on its world premiere at the Sundance Festival; the directors had to do some re-editing anyway, because the soundtracks on the DCP "were out of synch with each other." Maddin said: "It was a nightmare. I felt the movie didn't get its premiere there. We went back and tightened it up because it was too long even for me, and now it's the right length."

=== Music ===
Most of the film's music was composed by Galen Johnson (who was writing music since 2005) and Guy Maddin, who sometimes traded their files for mutual input. Maddin worked primarily in Audacity to create ambient soundscapes, while Johnson used software from Ableton and Reason Studios, pitch-shifting and chopping old public domain records, at times adding his own MIDI keyboard elements.

For some of the tracks Johnson baked LP records and then recorded the results and use that as a basis for some compositions.

Band Sparks contributed song "The Final Derriere" for their appearance in the film as "the Faceless Crooner". Maddin alleged that the song was recorded within a few hours of him and Johnson asking them to do it.

=== Title design ===
Galen Johnson created 500 intertitles for the film (although roughly 400 remain in the final edit), using a variety of inspirations ranging from old cards to silent films to VHS recordings of adult films. Since the movie is a Canadian production he had to redo each of them in French, as well, meaning that total work output was at least 800 intertitles.

For the end credits he initially wanted to give everyone in the crew their own card, but production was running out of time, so Johnson only did that to cast and followed with a regular end credits crawl, also underlining that silent films typically didn't have end credits.

== Release ==
The Forbidden Room premiered at the 2015 Sundance Film Festival on 26 January 2015. It also screened at the 2015 Toronto International Film Festival on 16 September 2015.

The film was theatrically released in the United States on 7 October 2015 and in Canada two days later on 9 October and was released in the United Kingdom on 11 December 2015.

=== Critical reception ===
The film received critical acclaim. On Rotten Tomatoes, the film has a 96% rating based on 67 reviews, with an average rating of 8.16/10. The site's consensus states: "The Forbidden Room may frustrate viewers looking for a linear experience, but those seeking a challenge – or already familiar with director Guy Maddin's work – will be rewarded." Metacritic reports an 81 out of 100 rating, based on 14 critics, indicating "universal acclaim".

In December, the film was announced as part of TIFF's annual Canada's Top Ten screening series of the ten best Canadian films of the year.

=== Accolades ===
The film won the Rogers Best Canadian Film Award (C$100,000, awarded by the Toronto Film Critics Association.

Galen Johnson received a Canadian Screen Award nomination for Best Art Direction/Production Design at the 4th Canadian Screen Awards in 2016. His title design for the film earned the top spot of Art of the Title Top 10 Title Sequences of 2015.

== See also ==
- The Seances project.
- Lost films
