= Seances (film) =

- Teaser poster
- Directed by: Guy Maddin; Evan Johnson; Galen Johnson
- Written by: Evan Johnson; Robert Kotyk; Guy Maddin; Kim Morgan (additional writer); John Ashbery (additional writer)
- Produced by: Olivia Cooper Hadjian; Alicia Smith; David Christensen; Dana Dansereau; Loc Dao
- Starring: Mathieu Amalric; Charlotte Rampling; Udo Kier; Geraldine Chaplin; Maria de Medeiros; Amira Casar; Adèle Haenel; Ariane Labed; Elina Löwensohn; Kim Morgan; Mathieu Demy; André Wilms; Jean-François Stévenin; Slimane Dazi; Jacques Nolot; Grégory Gadebois; Gregory Hlady; Jacques Bonnaffé; Christophe Paou; Miguel Eduardo Cueva; Victoire Du Bois; Jeanne de France; Robinson Stévenin; Jean-Baptiste Phou; Rudy Andriamimarinosy
- Cinematography: Benjamin Kasulke
- Edited by: John Gurdebeke
- Production company: National Film Board of Canada
- Release date: 2016
- Country: Canada
- Language: English

Seances is a 2016 interactive project by filmmaker and installation artist Guy Maddin, with co-creators Evan Johnson and Galen Johnson, and the National Film Board of Canada, combining Maddin's recreations of lost films with an algorithmic film generator that allows for multiple storytelling permutations. Maddin began the project in 2012 in Paris, France, shooting footage for 18 films at the Centre Georges Pompidou (this installation was titled Spiritismes, the French word for "seances", leading to press confusion about the project title) and continued shooting footage for an additional 12 films at the Phi Centre in Montreal, Quebec, Canada. The Paris and Montreal shoots each took three weeks, with Maddin completing one short film of approximately 15–20 minutes each day. The shoots were also presented as art installation projects, during which Maddin, along with the cast and crew, held a “séance” during which Maddin "invite[d] the spirit of a lost photoplay to possess them."

On December 31st, 2025, the project became inactive on the National Film Board's website, as "the technology it relied on is no longer compatible with the updated standards of [its] platform."

== Production history ==
Seances grew out of Maddin's Hauntings project. Noah Cowan, a former director of the Toronto International Film Festival, told Maddin "he didn’t think it was possible to make art on the Internet", which "reminded [Maddin] of what people said about cinema when it was starting out, when the moviolas and kinetoscopes were considered artless novelties."

Maddin began with the idea of “shooting adaptations of lost films” and originally conceived the project as making “title-for-title remakes of specific lost films” but altered this plan in favour of producing original material as the project developed. Maddin completed 11 films to show as installation loops for Noah Cowan and the Toronto International Film Festival’s Bell Lightbox theatre for this 2010 Hauntings project.

At the SXSW 2012 festival, Maddin announced that he had begun production on the Seances project, for which he would shoot one hundred short films within a hundred-day span, at locations in Canada, France, and the United States. However, Maddin abandoned this approach to the project to focus more fully on original script creation, partnering with writers Evan Johnson and Robert Kotyk, with additional writing by Maddin’s wife Kim Morgan and American poet John Ashbery.

Maddin and Johnson also co-directed and shot, concurrently, a feature film titled The Forbidden Room, with the same writers. Although often misreported as the same project, The Forbidden Room “is a feature film with its own separate story and stars” while “Seances will be an interactive Internet project.” Many of the actors in Seances also appear in The Forbidden Room.

== Algorithmic storytelling ==
Each viewer sees a unique film. Software designed by Halifax-based Nickel Media utilizes an algorithm to create the narrative from scenes shot by Maddin, to form a 10- to 13-minute film, each with a unique title. The number of films ensures "hundreds of billions of unique permutations."

== Launch ==
On April 14, 2016, Seances was launched online as part of Tribeca Film Festival's Storyscapes program.

== List of "resurrected" films ==
In addition to reimagining lost films, Maddin is also "resurrecting" projects that were planned but never filmed. Maddin has stated that he will not be parodying or otherwise mimicking the approach of the directors whose films he is reenvisioning, but rather tried to capture the imagined "spirits of the films, rather than of their directors." Films will not be shown in their entirety, but rather, offered as fragments in order to be recombined online.

=== Paris ===
The following films were filmed at Centre Pompidou, Paris, February 22 - March 12, 2012.

- Dream Woman (lost Alice Guy movie, 1914, USA)
- Thérèse Raquin [or Shadows of Fear] (lost Jacques Feyder, 1928, Germany)
- Gardener Boy Sought (lost George Schnéevoigt, 1913, Denmark)
- Poto-Poto (unrealized Erich von Stroheim project)
- Rausch [Intoxication] (lost Ernst Lubitsch, 1919, Germany)
- The Strength of a Moustache (lost Mikio Naruse, 1931, Japan)
- Lines of the Hand (unrealized Jean Vigo; his daughter Luce Vigo acted in this)
- Over Barbed Wire (unrealized Aleksandr Dovzhenko, USSR)
- Fist of a Cripple (lost Tetos Dimitriadis, 1930, Greece)
- Blue Mountains Mystery (lost Lottie Lyell, 1921, Australia)
- Idle Wives (lost Lois Weber, 1916)
- Resurrection of Love (lost Kenji Mizoguchi, 1923, Japan)
- Tararira (lost Benjamin Fondane, 1936, Argentina)
- Bits of Life (lost Lon Chaney, Sr. & Anna May Wong, 1921, USA)
- Ladies of the Mob (lost William Wellman)
- Hello Pop! (lost Jack Cummings, 1933, USA)
- Sperduto nel buio [Lost in the Dark] (lost Nino Martoglio, 1914, Italy)
- The Blind Man (Alfred Hitchcock, unrealized)

An additional film, How to Take a Bath (lost Dwain Esper sexploitation film, 1937, USA) was scripted by American poet John Ashbery and completed in 2010." Footage from this film appears in The Forbidden Room. In addition, Ashbery has given [Maddin] a copy of his collage-play The Inn of the Guardian Angel, which was produced from New York Times obituaries and 1930 Hollywood fanzines, to "strip-mine for dialogue for the lost films."

=== Montreal ===
The following works were refilmed at Centre PHI, Montreal, July 7–20, 2013.

- Saint, Devil and Woman (Frederick Sullivan, 1916)
- Tokyo’s Ginza District (Tsunekichi Shibata, 1898, Japan)
- Gabriele, the Lamplighter of the Harbour (Elvira Notari, 1919, Italy)
- Der Janus-kopf (F.W. Murnau, 1920, Germany)
- Women Skeletons (Guan Heifeng, 1922, China)
- Scout Day (Albert Tessier, 1929, Canada)
- The Scorching Flame (1918, Armand Robin, Canada)
- The Red Wolves (Joseph Roth)
- Trumpet Island
- The Forbidden Room
- Drakula Halala
- Dalagang Bukid

== Recognition ==
In April 2017, Seances received a Webby Award nomination in the Art & Experimental/Film & Video category.
