= South Terminal =

2019 film

- Film poster
- French: Terminal Sud
- Directed by: Rabah Ameur-Zaïmeche
- Written by: Rabah Ameur-Zaïmeche
- Produced by: Rabah Ameur-Zaïmeche
- Starring: Ramzy Bedia
- Cinematography: Irina Lubtchansky; Camille Clément
- Edited by: Grégoire Pontécaille
- Music by: Kraja
- Distributed by: Potemkine Films
- Release date: 12 August 2019 (Locarno)
- Running time: 96 minutes
- Country: France
- Language: French

South Terminal (French: Terminal Sud) is a 2019 French drama film directed by Rabah Ameur-Zaïmeche. It was screened in the Contemporary World Cinema section at the 2019 Toronto International Film Festival.

== Cast ==
- Ramzy Bedia
- Amel Brahim-Djelloul
- Slimane Dazi
- Vanessa Liautey
- Jacques Nolot
