= Bring Me the Head of Tim Horton =

- Directed by: Guy Maddin; Evan Johnson; Galen Johnson
- Written by: Guy Maddin; Evan Johnson; Galen Johnson
- Produced by: Niv Fichman; Jody Shapiro
- Cinematography: John Gurdebeke; Jody Shapiro
- Edited by: Evan Johnson
- Music by: Galen Johnson; Asher Lenz; Stephen Skratt
- Production companies: Rhombus Media; Triple 7 Films
- Release date: September 14, 2015 (TIFF)
- Running time: 30 minutes
- Country: Canada
- Language: English

Bring Me the Head of Tim Horton is a 2015 Canadian short documentary film, directed by Guy Maddin, Evan Johnson and Galen Johnson.

== Summary ==
Documenting the making of Paul Gross's contemporaneous feature film Hyena Road, the film also functions as a critique of the commercial excesses and glorified violence of mainstream filmmaking.

== Release ==
The film premiered at the 2015 Toronto International Film Festival, and was named to TIFF's annual year-end Canada's Top Ten list for 2015.
