= Campo Grande (film) =

2015 film

- Directed by: Sandra Kogut
- Written by: Sandra Kogut; Felipe Sholl
- Produced by: Flavio Tambellini; Laurent Lavolé
- Starring: Julia Bernat; Rayane do Amaral; Ygor Manoel; Carla Ribas
- Cinematography: Ivo Lopes
- Edited by: Sérgio Mekler
- Production company: Tambellini Filmes
- Distributed by: Imovision
- Release date: 13 September 2015 (TIFF)
- Running time: 108 minutes
- Countries: Brazil; France
- Language: Portuguese

Campo Grande is a 2015 Brazilian-French drama film directed by Sandra Kogut. The film received a production funding award in 2013 from Agência Nacional do Cinema and entered production. The film had its world premiere screening in the Contemporary World Cinema section of the 2015 Toronto International Film Festival.

== Production ==
Sandra Kogut wrote her original script for Campo Grande while spending a year in Berlin. The concept was developed from a scene from the director's first film. In 2013, Campo Grande became the only Brazilian project selected for co-production at the Co-Production Market Berlinale event held in São Paulo.

== Cast ==
- Julia Bernat as Lila
- Rayane do Amaral as Rayne
- Ygor Manoel as Ygor
- Carla Ribas as Regina
- Pedro Pauleey as Danilo
