= Full Contact (2015 film) =

2015 film

- Film poster
- Directed by: David Verbeek
- Written by: David Verbeek
- Starring: Grégoire Colin
- Production company: Lemming Film
- Distributed by: September Film Distribution
- Release date: 15 September 2015 (TIFF)
- Running time: 105 minutes
- Countries: Netherlands; Croatia
- Languages: English; French

Full Contact is a 2015 Dutch-Croatian drama film directed by David Verbeek. Shot in Croatia, it was shown in the Platform section of the 2015 Toronto International Film Festival.

== Premise ==
Presented in two chapters, a French drone pilot flies drones in the Middle East from Nevada in the United States. He carries out a drone strike on a building to kill a terrorist inside, but he discovers afterward that the building was a school for boys.

== Cast ==
- Grégoire Colin as Ivan
- Lizzie Brocheré as Cindy
- Slimane Dazi as Al Zaim
- Alain Blazevic as Colonel Hendrix
- Robert Jozinovic as Van Patton
- Zvon Munivrana as Priest

== See also ==
- List of films featuring drones
