= Rumours (2024 film) =

2024 comedy horror film

- US release poster
- Directed by: Guy Maddin; Evan Johnson Galen Johnson
- Written by: Guy Maddin; Evan Johnson Galen Johnson
- Produced by: Liz Jarvis; Lars Knudsen; Philipp Kreuzer
- Starring: Cate Blanchett; Roy Dupuis; Denis Ménochet; Nikki Amuka-Bird; Charles Dance; Rolando Ravello; Takehiro Hira; Zlatko Burić; Alicia Vikander
- Cinematography: Stefan Ciupek
- Music by: Kristian Eidnes Andersen
- Production companies: Square Peg; Buffalo Gal Pictures; Maze Pictures
- Distributed by: Elevation Pictures (Canada); Plaion Pictures and StudioCanal (Germany)
- Release dates: 18 May 2024 (Cannes); 18 October 2024 (United States)
- Running time: 104 minutes
- Countries: Canada; Germany
- Language: English
- Box office: $699,822

Rumours is a 2024 comedy horror film written and directed by Guy Maddin, Evan Johnson, and Galen Johnson. The film stars Cate Blanchett, Charles Dance, Roy Dupuis, Denis Ménochet, Nikki Amuka-Bird, Rolando Ravello, Takehiro Hira, Zlatko Burić, and Alicia Vikander.

Rumours had its world premiere at the 77th Cannes Film Festival on 18 May 2024. The film received generally positive reviews from critics.

== Plot ==
World leaders meet at the G7 at a German hotel to compose a statement about an unspecified crisis, failing to take it seriously. The Canadian Prime Minister is upset that the British Prime Minister won't allow them to rekindle a past affair and ends up trysting with the German Chancellor in the woods instead. After sunset the French President returns to the outdoor gazebo where they had been working and dining to inform them of the presence of reanimated bog bodies they had seen excavated earlier in the day, and they also realize due to the absence of their servers all other people have mysteriously vanished.

They venture out to find anyone they can but get lost in the woods beset by thick fog and puzzled by a giant brain only the suddenly Swedish-speaking President of the European Commission (whom none of them can understand) believes will be a game-changer for the world, but in her despair that none of them seem to grasp the gravity of the situation, she sets herself and the brain on fire. Attempting to get a response on the emergency phone line, they reach only an artificial intelligence apparently designed to trap child predators but play along with it in an attempt to find their way back to their hotel.

Once there they meet with the man operating the A.I. who similarly kills himself before they can get any meaningful information from him. Finally they step out onto the balcony and the Canadian Prime Minister reads their statement to an audience of a few masturbating bog bodies as the world around them goes up in flames.

== Cast ==
- Cate Blanchett as Hilda Ortmann, the Chancellor of Germany
- Roy Dupuis as Maxime Laplace, the Prime Minister of Canada
- Denis Ménochet as Sylvain Broulez, the President of France
- Nikki Amuka-Bird as Cardosa Dewindt, the Prime Minister of the United Kingdom
- Charles Dance as Edison Wolcott, the President of the United States
- Rolando Ravello as Antonio Lamorte, the Prime Minister of Italy
- Takehiro Hira as Tatsuro Iwasaki, the Prime Minister of Japan
- Zlatko Burić as Jonas Glob, the President of the European Council
- Alicia Vikander as Celestine Sproul, the President of the European Commission

== Production ==
A German-Canadian production from Square Peg. Producers on the film are Liz Jarvis for Buffalo Gal Pictures, Philipp Kreuzer for Maze Pictures, and Lars Knudsen for Square Peg. Cate Blanchett joined the cast in October 2023. In January 2024, Alicia Vikander and Charles Dance joined the cast. Principal photography took place in Hungary in October 2023. Filming locations also included Winnipeg in Canada.

== Release ==
The film was selected to be screened out of competition at the 77th Cannes Film Festival, where it had its world premiere on 18 May 2024. It was also selected for the MAMI Mumbai Film Festival 2024, where it screened under the World Cinema section.

== Reception ==
On review aggregator website Rotten Tomatoes, the film has an approval rating of 76% based on 127 reviews, with an average rating of 6.1/10. The site consensus states "A brainy satire that has a ball turning the supposed adults in the room into helpless children, Rumours spins a one-joke premise into a sophisticated riot." Metacritic, which uses a weighted average, assigned the film a score of 69 out of 100, based on 31 critics, indicating "generally favorable" reviews.

The film was named to TIFF's annual Canada's Top Ten list for 2024.

=== Accolades ===
Award	Date of ceremony	Category	Nominee(s)	Result	Ref.
Toronto Film Critics Association	2024	Rogers Best Canadian Film Award	Guy Maddin	Nominated	
Toronto Film Critics Association	2024	Outstanding Performance in a Canadian Film	Roy Dupuis	Nominated	
Canadian Screen Awards	2025	Best Lead Performance in a Comedy Film	Cate Blanchett	Won	
Canadian Screen Awards	2025	Best Supporting Performance in a Comedy Film	Roy Dupuis	Nominated	
Canadian Screen Awards	2025	Best Art Direction/Production Design	Zosia Mackenzie, John O'Regan, Márton Vörös, Rita Hetényi	Nominated	
Canadian Screen Awards	2025	Best Casting in a Film	Avy Kaufman	Nominated	
Directors Guild of Canada	2025	Best Direction in a Feature Film	Guy Maddin	Nominated	
