= The Dead Father (film) =

- Directed by: Guy Maddin
- Written by: Guy Maddin
- Starring: D.P. Snidal; Margaret Ann MacLeod; John Harvie; Angela Heck; Rachel Toles; Jill Maddin; W. Steve Snyder
- Cinematography: W. Steve snyder Kathy Driscoll; Bob Russick
- Production company: Extra Large Productions
- Release date: 1985 (Toronto International Film Festival)
- Running time: 21 minutes
- Country: Canada
- Language: English

The Dead Father is a Canadian film directed by Guy Maddin, and his debut film. The short film tells a surrealist story of a Son's feelings of anger, sadness, and inadequacy after the return of his Dead Father. The Dead Father is shot in black and white on 16mm film and features Maddin's usual use on the stylistic conventions of silent-era cinema.

== Plot ==
The narrating "Son" presents the audience with three photo albums' worth of memories, recovered from the attic. One recounts the mania of his cleanliness-obsessed neighbour and another concerns his "inexplicable loathing" for bushes. But the Son wants to focus on the episode of his Dead Father who, immediately after death, returned to haunt his family.

This development seems promising at first (the Dead Father lies motionless on the kitchen table and in his widow's bed) but it soon becomes clear, as the Son puts it, that the Dead Father does not seem to be "dead in the traditional sense," with brief recoveries during which he makes "various vague requests." The Son resists at first, but then gives up and attempts to make small talk with his Dead Father and even share a meal. The Dead Father enlists the Son in errands but is disappointed at the Son's inability to fulfill his simple requests for fish. The haunting continues in this lackadaisical manner, and it becomes clear that the Dead Father is mostly spending his days at the home of a new and better family down the street.

The Son is soon distressed to find that his Dead Father has fallen sick, and the Dead Father appears driven to death by this illness (film scholar William Beard has suggested that this section of the film is a flashback sequence).

The Dead Father sends the Son on another errand, to take his little sister to school, but in his habitual forgetfulness he doesn't and she runs off, getting lost. Finally, the Son returns home to find his mother coddling his frightened sister and is struck by the Dead Father for his irresponsibility. Angered at his sister for getting him into trouble, the Son assaults her teddy bears. The family continues to mourn and the Son discovers that his older sister's boyfriend, Cesar, has been sneaking in at night to sleep with her (due, perhaps, to the absence of the Dead Father). The Son is spurred to "reclaim [his Dead Father] once and for all" and sets out at night in search of the Dead Father.

The Son discovers that the bushes and yards in the neighbourhood are thick with corpses at night, and finally discovers his own Dead Father amongst these corpses. Taking out a spoon, the Son eats his Dead Father, digging into the flesh of his belly, until the Dead Father wakes and fixes the Son with a reproachful stare. The Son then helps his Dead Father recover from the ordeal. The Dead Father, seeing the problems he has caused for the family by his return, leads the Son to the attic. There, the two reminisce over photo albums and the Dead Father gets the Son to help pack the Dead Father away in a storage trunk as if in a coffin. The reluctant Son closes the lid.

== Cast ==
- Dr. D.P. Snidal as The Dead Father
- Margaret Ann MacLeod as The Widow
- John Harvie as The Son
- Angela Heck as The Daughter
- Rachel Toles as Little Girl I
- Jill Maddin as Little Girl II
- W. Steve Snyder as Cesar

== Release ==
The Dead Father was produced with funding from the Winnipeg Arts Council and the Manitoba Arts Council with a budget of about $5000. It was accepted into the 1985 Toronto International Film Festival.

The Dead Father was released to home video as a bonus feature on the Tales from the Gimli Hospital DVD and as one of four films featured on Isolation in the 1980s, a collection of historically significant films from the Winnipeg Film Group.
