= O Negative (2015 film) =

2015 Canadian short horror film

- Theatrical release poster
- Directed by: Steven McCarthy
- Written by: Steven McCarthy; Alyx Melone
- Produced by: Steven McCarthy; Tony Elliott; Sarah Lazarovic; Jessy Camilleri
- Starring: Steven McCarthy; Alyx Melone
- Cinematography: Cabot McNenly
- Edited by: Stéphane Lafleur
- Music by: Gordon Hyland; Sam McLellan
- Production company: Candles Are For Burning
- Distributed by: Meridian Releasing
- Release date: September 10, 2015 (TIFF)
- Running time: 15 minutes
- Country: Canada
- Language: English

O Negative is a 2015 Canadian short horror film directed by Steven McCarthy. It stars McCarthy and Alyx Melone, who also co-wrote the script with McCarthy. The film centres on a man driving through the night, seeking shelter and sustenance for his girlfriend, who is revealed to be a vampire dependent on human blood.

== Plot ==
A man (McCarthy) drives late at night with his girlfriend (Melone) asleep in the passenger seat. She appears pale and unwell. They search for a place to stay, eventually finding a remote motel. Once inside, the man's desperation becomes clear as he tries to care for the woman, whose illness is revealed to be a deep craving for human blood, identifying her as a vampire. The narrative explores the dynamic of their relationship under the strain of her addiction-like need.

== Cast ==
- Steven McCarthy as The Man
- Alyx Melone as The Woman

== Themes ==
Critics noted the film uses the vampire trope as a potential metaphor for addiction, codependency, and the extreme lengths one might go to for love within a relationship burdened by a destructive force.

== Production ==
The film was produced by McCarthy alongside Tony Elliott, Sarah Lazarovic, and Jessy Camilleri under the banner Candles Are For Burning. Stéphane Lafleur, known primarily as a director, served as the film's editor. Cabot McNenly was the cinematographer.

== Release and reception ==
O Negative premiered at the 2015 Toronto International Film Festival on September 10, 2015. It received positive attention for its atmospheric visuals, minimalist storytelling, and the performances of McCarthy and Melone.

In December 2015, the film was named to TIFF's annual year-end Canada's Top Ten list for short films. The film was later featured online by Short of the Week in October 2016.
