= Kim Morgan =

Canadian sculpture and installation artist

- Born: Saskatoon, Saskatchewan
- Known for: Installation artist, Sculptor, Video artist, Public Artist, writer
- Awards: see full list below

Kim Morgan is a Canadian sculpture and installation artist based in Nova Scotia, and a faculty member of Nova Scotia College of Art and Design University (NSCAD). Working with a wide range of materials, technologies and techniques from varying disciplines, Morgan explores "how we produce and negotiate the spaces we live in, how we move through them, and how this affect individual and collective identities." Morgan's examination of how we perceive time and space is the backbone of her art practice.

== Biography ==
Born in Saskatoon, Saskatchewan, Morgan first earned a BA in English Literature from McGill University, then moving on to earn a BFA from the School of Visual Arts, New York City, with a focus on sculpture. Morgan continued her fine art education at the University of Regina (MFA), again focusing on sculpture and additionally installation work.

== Art ==
More recently, Morgan has been working in interdisciplinary collaborations to create several public art projects. Using her public art projects to create "active cultural and social spaces", with the intent that the work will act as an impetus for dialogue about current issues.

Morgan's work has been exhibited in the United States, Canada, and in Europe. Some of her more recent awards include the Presidents Award of Excellence (2012), the Lieutenant Governor of Nova Scotia's Masterwork Award (2012), and the upcoming Rauschenberg Residency through the Rauschenberg Foundation (2014).

In 2012, Morgan created the piece Range Light (2010) for inclusion in the Oh, Canada. As an antiquated technology, range lights and light houses were once used to assist ships in their navigational courses. In Range Light, Morgan created a tribute to this dying technology by replicating a full size lighthouse in latex. The piece was exhibited in October 2010 and continues to be exhibited in Oh Canada, on display at MASS MoCA.

Window (Dis)Plays: Reality Shopping (2009) is a concept piece for the book Public Art in Canada: Critical Perspectives. The work consists of a time-based video public performance. Video of the activities of shoppers was captured during the day by video surveillance cameras, and at night a randomly selected portion of the video is projected onto the exterior windows of the store. The work considers the use of collected data (video and photographs) that is used for market research and is not accessible to the public—the relationship between public consumerism and private corporate data collecting.

== Exhibitions ==
Morgan has had a number of exhibitions, ranging from installation to sculpture. In WeakForce4 (2013), Morgan collaborated with a number of international artists on a project that focused on "transdisciplinarity", co-operative research and collaboration. The project sought to explore social, structural and creative problems with an outcome that extended beyond specific disciplines with positive social applications. The group show opened at St. Paul Street Gallery, November 2013.

In 2013, Morgan participated in Poeticizing the Urban Apparatus: Scenes of Innovation, a conference art exhibition in New York City. During the conference, Morgan showed a video of her research-driven project in pulse in collaboration with Ellen Moffat. The project considered questions of the relationship between affective urban space and the body using locative mobile technology and physical monitors.

In the extensive Oh, Canada exhibition at the Mass. Museum of Contemporary Art (May 2012-May 2013), Morgan participated in a group exhibition of over sixty artists from across Canada, representing all of the provinces and territories. The exhibition explores the range of imagery of contemporary Canadian art, and the cultural identity within it.

== Awards ==
In 2012, Morgan was nominated for, and won, the Lieutenant Governor of Nova Scotia Masterworks Arts Award for her piece Range Light (2010). The Nova Scotia Masterworks Awards Foundation presents the Lieutenant Governor award annually to recognize work that has strong ties to Nova Scotia. Morgan also received the Presidents award of Excellence in April 2012. This award was presented to Morgan by NSCAD University for her inclusion in the exhibition Oh, Canada.

Morgan has recently been chosen to participate in the Rauschenberg Residency, through the Rauschenberg foundation, which takes place in Captiva, Florida. The residency is set to begin May 18, 2014 and continue until June 14, 2014. Morgan will be accompanied by an interdisciplinary group of thirteen other artists.

== Bibliography (selected) ==
- Jenkner, Ingrid (2012). Kim Morgan: Range Light, Borden-Carleton, PEI, 2010. Halifax: MSVU Art Gallery and Confederation Centre Art. p. 33.
- Markonish, Dennis (2012). Oh, Canada: Contemporary Art from North America. Cambridge: The MIT Press. pp. 316–319.
- Dykhuis, Peter. "Place Markers: Mapping Locations and Probing Boundaries" (PDF). Dalhousie Art Gallery.
- Gérin Annie, McLean James (2011). Public Art in Canada: Critical Perspectives. Toronto: University of Toronto Press.
