= Evan Johnson (filmmaker) =

Canadian filmmaker

Evan Johnson is a Canadian filmmaker from Winnipeg, Manitoba, most noted for his frequent collaborations with Guy Maddin. He was codirector of Maddin's The Forbidden Room, which was the winner of the Toronto Film Critics Association's Rogers Best Canadian Film Award at the Toronto Film Critics Association Awards 2015.

Johnson and Maddin have also codirected the short films Puberty (2014), Elms (2014), Colours (2014), Cold (2014), Lines of the Hand (2015) and Once a Chicken (2015).

He and his brother Galen Johnson were jointly codirectors of Maddin's short films Bring Me the Head of Tim Horton (2015), Seances (2016), The Green Fog (2017), Accidence (2018), Stump the Guesser (2020) and The Rabbit Hunters (2020), as well as the feature film Rumours (2024).
