= The Green Fog =

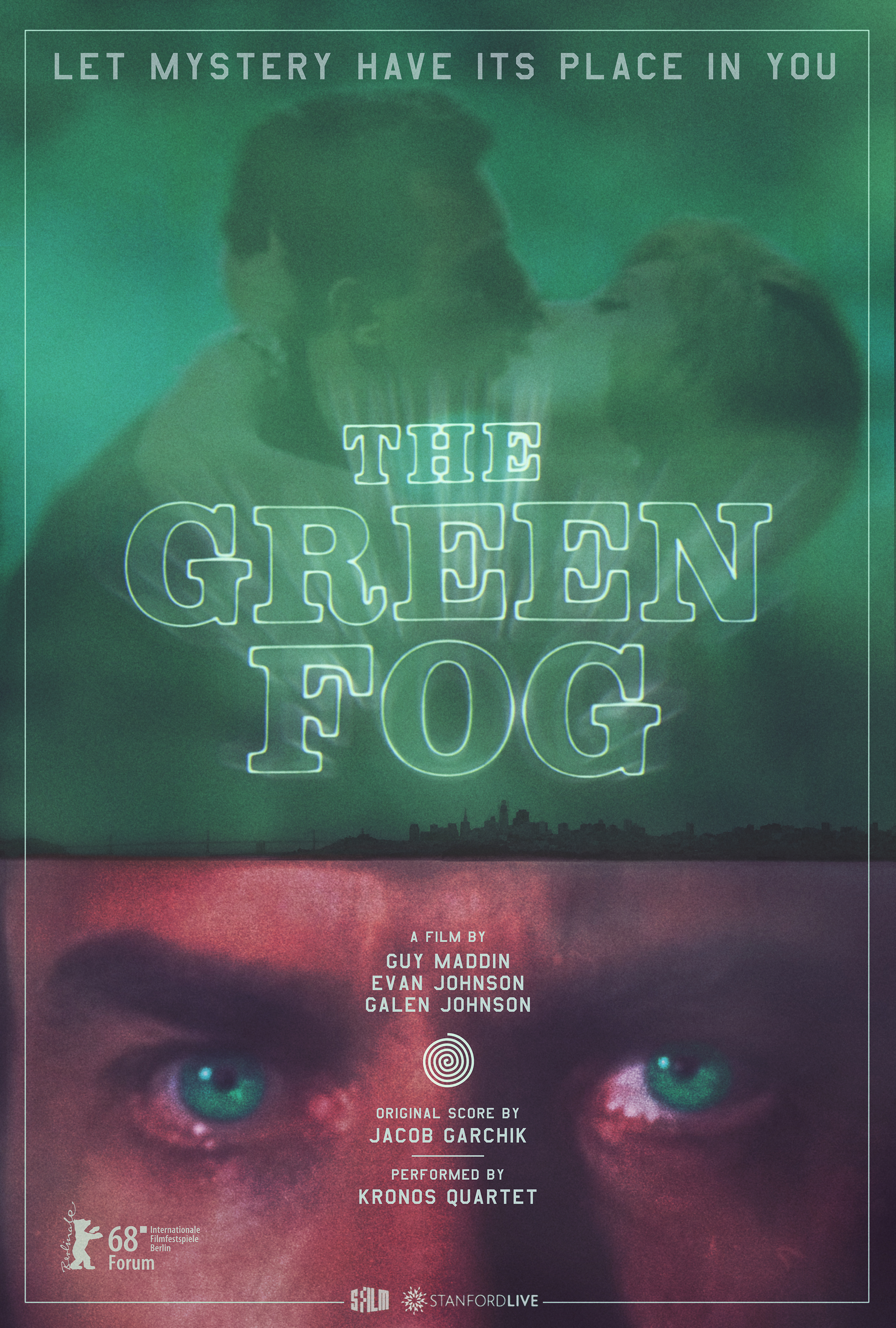
- Directed by: Guy Maddin; Evan Johnson; Galen Johnson
- Edited by: Evan Johnson; Galen Johnson
- Production company: Development Ltd.
- Distributed by: Balcony Booking (USA)
- Release date: April 16, 2017 (San Francisco International Film Festival)
- Running time: 63 minutes
- Countries: Canada; USA
- Language: English

The Green Fog is an experimental film directed by Guy Maddin, Evan Johnson and Galen Johnson, that loosely revisits the plot of Alfred Hitchcock's 1958 film Vertigo through a collage of found footage repurposed from old movies and television shows set in San Francisco. The film was commissioned by the San Francisco Film Society for the 60th San Francisco International Film Festival’s and premiered at the festival's close on April 16, 2017. It then entered limited release on January 5, 2018 and began to tour international festivals.The film features an original score by composer Jacob Garchik and Kronos Quartet.

== Festivals ==
The Green Fog was selected to screen at the following film festivals:

- 2017 San Francisco International Film Festival
- 2017 Vancouver International Film Festival
- 2018 Berlin International Film Festival
- 2018 Hong Kong International Film Festival
- 2018 France's Cinéma du Réel festival
- 2018 Buenos Aires International Festival of Independent Cinema
- 2018 Las Palmas de Gran Canaria Festival Internacional De Cine
- 2018 South Korea's Jeonju International Film Festival
- 2018 Ukraine's Molodist International Film Festival
- 2018 New Zealand International Film Festival
- 2018 Greece's Thessaloniki International Film Festival
- 2018 BFI London Film Festival

== Awards ==
The Green Fog was nominated for the C.I.C.A.E. Award at the Berlin International Film Festival in 2018, and has won the following awards:

- 2018 Golden Lady Harimaguada (Best Film), Las Palmas de Gran Canaria Festival Internacional De Cine
- 2018—Los Angeles Film Critics Association Awards, The Douglas Edwards Experimental Film Award

== Critical reception ==
On the review aggregator website Rotten Tomatoes, 96% of 25 critics' reviews are positive. The website's consensus reads: "Recreating the experience of watching Alfred Hitchcock's masterwork with patchwork collage, The Green Fog is a creative homage that will envelop audiences with its infectious love for cinema." On Metacritic, the film has a weighted average score of 78 out of 100 based on 10 critics, which the site labels as "generally favorable" reviews.

New York Times critic Ben Kenigsberg noted Maddin's "slight arrogance in presuming that one of the greatest films of all time [Hitchcock's Vertigo ...] could be approximated, even a little, using clips from lesser directors" but also notes that "if trying to recreate a lost object of obsession from the materials at hand was Hitchcock’s subject, then he couldn’t ask for a more fitting tribute" and calls the movie " a marvel of film scholarship."

Ty Burr, writing for the Boston Globe, called the film "eerie, witty, and unexpectedly moving" and compared it to Christian Marclay's installation film The Clock. Critics also noted that, in addition to serving as a tribute to Hitchcock's Vertigo and a method of deconstructing its own self-critical aspects (which Maddin has discussed in interviews), the film pays homage to the city of San Francisco and its stature in film history, serving as "a scrambled history of San Francisco told through moving pictures."
