= Ellen Moffat =

Canadian media artist (born 1954)

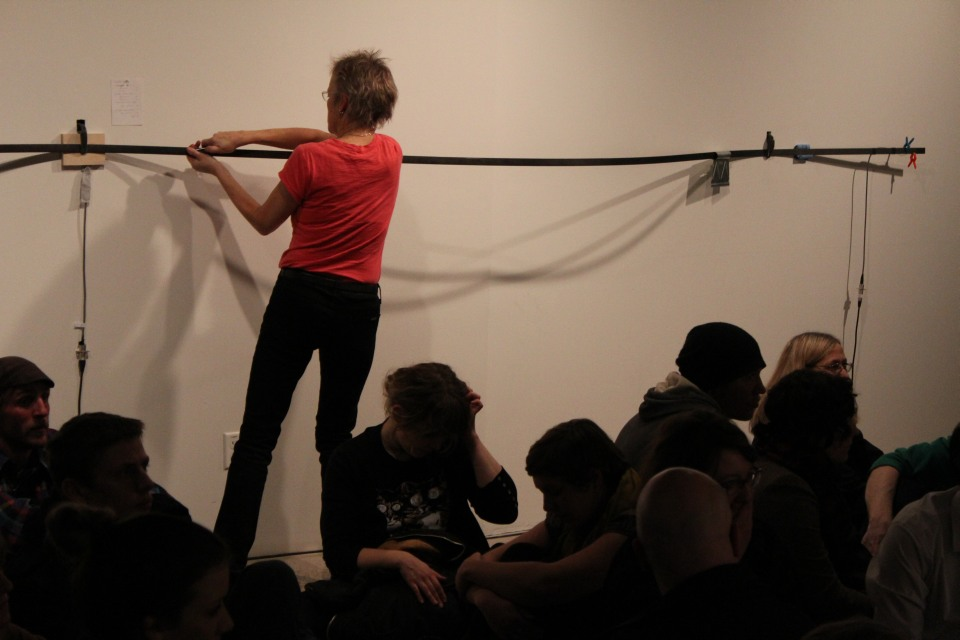
- Performance at PAVED Arts in November, 2011
- Born: 1954; Toronto, Ontario, Canada
- Education: University of Toronto; Concordia University; University of Regina
- Known for: Media Artist, Sound Artist, Installation Artist
- Website: ellenmoffat.ca

Ellen Moffat (born 1954) is a Canadian media artist who works in sound, image and text in installation and performance. Born in Toronto, Ontario, she now resides in Saskatoon, Saskatchewan.

== Education ==
Moffat obtained a BA in Anthropology from the University of Toronto, a BFA from Concordia University and an MFA from the University of Regina.

== Artwork ==
As an artist, Moffat has exhibited her work throughout Canada and internationally and has completed several artist's residencies. These include residencies at Video Vérité (now PAVED Arts) in Saskatoon, The Dunlop Gallery in Regina, CARFAC Saskatchewan in Prince Albert, and the Canada Council for the Arts' Paris Residency in 2012.

Moffat has also been involved in many art organizations as a cultural worker and board member and has worked as a sessional instructor at the University of Saskatchewan and the University of Regina.

Language and speech have been ongoing subjects of Moffat's exploration. The "COMP_OSE" installation exhibited in a national tour in 2008 and 2009 included two interactive interfaces - one creating language as sound, the other as text. These "instruments" engaged gallery goers in collaboration. These artistic concerns include the slippage in translation, as in the work "she, I, her" exhibited at The Dunlop Gallery in 2015. In 2017, she was commissioned to create Small Sonorities: Material Signals, a four-minute, multi-screen video for the Remai Modern Art Gallery web commission project.
