= Keith Richards: Under the Influence =

- Directed by: Morgan Neville
- Written by: Steve Jordan; Keith Richards; Waddy Wachtel
- Distributed by: Netflix
- Release date: September 17, 2015 (TIFF)
- Running time: 81 minutes
- Country: United States
- Language: English

Keith Richards: Under the Influence is a 2015 documentary film directed by Morgan Neville portraying Keith Richards as a songwriter, guitarist and performer as he records his first solo album in two decades. The film received its world premiere at the 2015 Toronto International Film Festival and was subsequently released via Netflix.

== Cast ==
- Steve Jordan
- Keith Richards
- Waddy Wachtel
- Tom Waits
