= Guy Maddin =

Canadian director, screenwriter and author (born 1956)

Guy Maddin CM OM
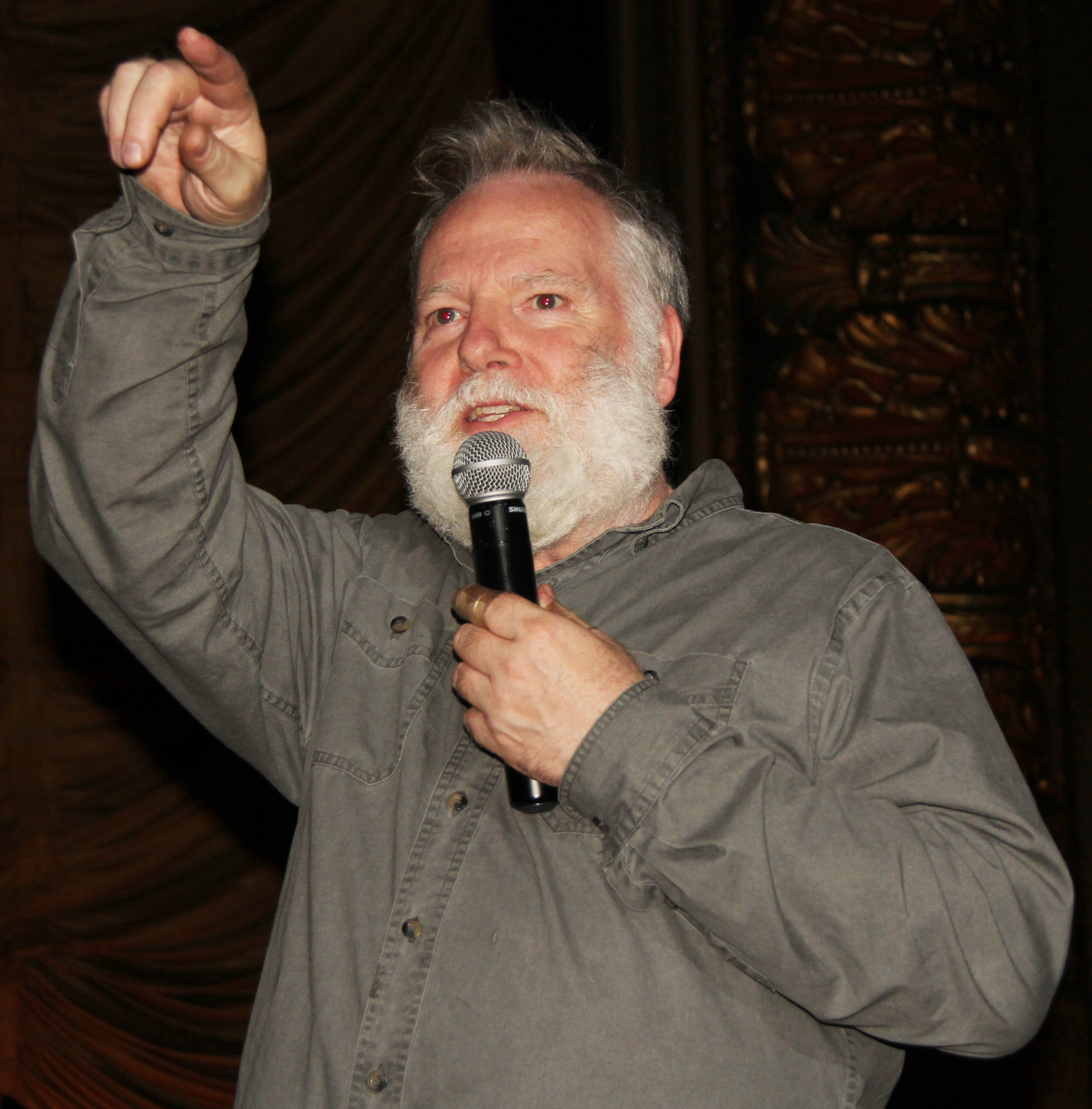
- Maddin at the 2017 James River Film Festival
- Born: February 28, 1956 (age 70); Winnipeg, Manitoba, Canada
- Education: University of Winnipeg
- Occupations: Film director; producer; screenwriter; cinematographer; film editor; installation artist; author
- Years active: 1985–present
- Notable work: Tales from the Gimli Hospital; The Heart of the World; Dracula: Pages from a Virgin's Diary; The Saddest Music in the World; My Winnipeg
- Spouses: Martha Jane Waugh (m. 1977; div. 1979) Elise Moore (m. 1995; div. 1997) Kim Morgan (m. 2010)
- Children: 1

Guy Maddin CM OM (born February 28, 1956) is a Canadian screenwriter, director, author, cinematographer, film editor, and installation artist. He is known for his incorporation of Silent-era film aesthetic into his work. Maddin was appointed to the Order of Canada in 2012.

Maddin served as a visiting lecturer at Harvard University's Department of Art, Film, and Visual Studies from 2015 to 2018.

== Early life ==
Guy Maddin was born on February 28, 1956, in Winnipeg, Manitoba.

Maddin was the youngest of four children. His elder siblings were Ross, born in 1944; Cameron, born in 1946; and Janet, born in 1949. Their mother, Herdis Maddin, was a hairdresser. Their father, Charles "Chas" Maddin, worked as a grain clerk and managed the Winnipeg Maroons hockey team.

In February 1963, when Maddin was six, his brother Cameron died by suicide on the grave of his girlfriend, who had died in a car crash. Fourteen years later, in 1977, Maddin's father died suddenly after a stroke.

Maddin attended Greenway School for elementary school, General Wolfe School for junior high and Daniel McIntyre Collegiate Institute for high school, all in Winnipeg. He then studied economics at the University of Winnipeg, graduating in 1977.

After graduating, Maddin held a variety of odd jobs, including bank manager, house painter, and photo archivist.

== Marriage and family ==
In 1977, Maddin married Martha Jane Waugh. Their daughter, Jilian, was born in 1978. The couple divorced in 1979, after about two years of marriage. Maddin married Elise Moore in 1995, and their marriage ended two years later. In December 2010, Maddin married the film critic Kim Morgan, and they separated in 2014.

== Career ==
Maddin began to take film classes at the University of Manitoba. There, Maddin met film professor Stephen Snyder, who held regular film screenings of titles from the school's film library at his home. Maddin attended, as did some early collaborators, including his friend John Boles Harvie, the future star of Maddin's first film, as well as filmmaker John Paizs. Maddin appeared as an actor in two of Paizs' short films,Oak, Ivy, and Other Dead Elms (1982) and The International Style (1983). Maddin drew early inspiration from the films of John Paizs, as well as experimental shorts by Stephen Snyder. Other early influences included L'Age d'Or by Luis Buñuel and Eraserhead by David Lynch; Maddin has cited their low budget, non-famous cast, atmospheres and ideas, and honesty. Maddin also met film professor George Toles, who became Maddin's co-writer on many of his future films. Maddin's core group of friends from this period, who played various roles in the production of his early film projects, were known as "the Drones" and included Harvie, Ian Handford, and Kyle McCulloch.

Maddin joined the Winnipeg Film Group around this time, and also became friends with producer Greg Klymkiw, with whom he began making a cable access television show, Survival (c. 1985–1987). Survival was a satirical talk show centred around "surviv[ing] the inevitable social/economic collapse and/or nuclear holocaust." The show became a cult hit in Winnipeg and excerpts were re-released on the compilation DVD Winnipeg Babysitter. Maddin plays a masked character on the show named "Concerned Citizen Stan".

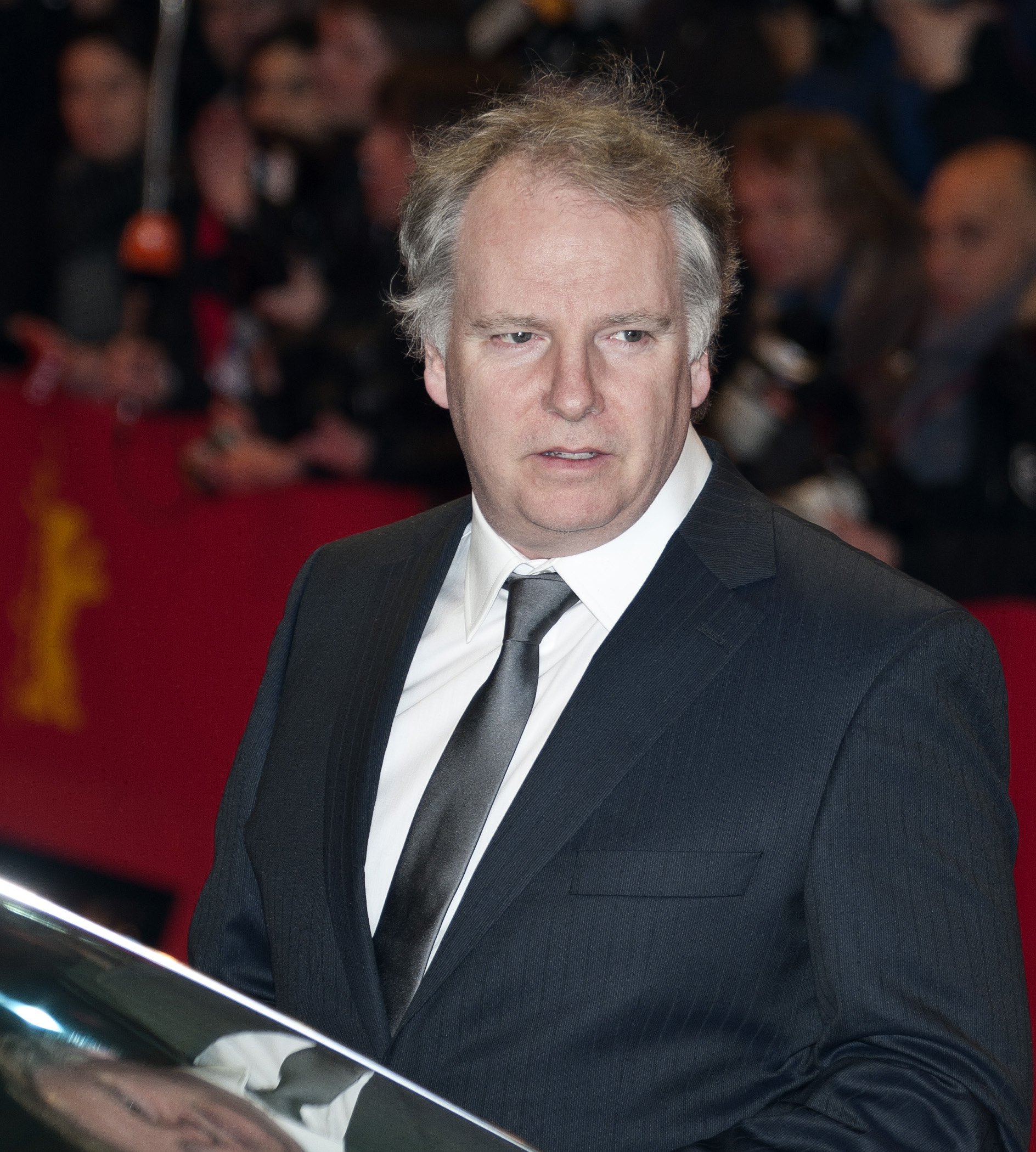
Maddin at the sixty-first Berlin International Film Festival (2011)

=== The Dead Father and Tales from the Gimli Hospital (1985–1988) ===
Maddin's first short film (as director, writer, producer, and cinematographer) was The Dead Father, a 25-minute black-and-white film about a young man whose father dies but continues to visit his family and disapprove of his son's life. Its budget is estimated at CA$5,000 (equivalent to CA$13,032 in 2025). Maddin began shooting The Dead Father in 1982 and finished the film in 1985. Spurred by the work of Snyder and Paizs, and together with Harvie and Handford, Maddin founded a film company called Extra Large Productions (they first decided on the name "Jumbo Productions" and went to get a jumbo pizza to celebrate, but changed the name when the pizzeria in Gimli, Manitoba, only served "extra large" pizzas).

Maddin cast John Harvie in the lead role as the son, and University of Manitoba medical professor Dan P. Snidal as the dead father. The Dead Father (1985) was shot in black-and-white on 16 mm film. The style of the film is inspired by Surrealism, with Maddin citing Luis Buñuel and Man Ray as its main influences. John Kozak cites as an example of Maddin's dream-like tone the climactic scene of the film, where the son attempts to resolve his relationship with his dead father by uncovering his corpse (hidden to sleep at night in some nearby brush) and attempting to devour his father using a large spoon—since the dead father awakens, the son cannot finish eating him and must instead pack his body away into a trunk in the family's attic. Although Maddin did not feel that the film's Winnipeg premiere had gone well, John Paizs convinced him to submit the film to the Toronto Film Festival and the festival accepted the film. At the festival Maddin met Atom Egoyan, Jeremy Podeswa, and Norman Jewison, and began to form connections with Canadian filmmakers across the national scene.

Maddin next began work on his feature film debut, Tales from the Gimli Hospital (1988), also shot in black-and-white on 16 mm film. Kyle McCulloch starred in the film as Einar, a lonely fisherman who contracts smallpox and begins to compete with another patient, Gunnar (played by Michael Gottli) for the attention of the young nurses. The film was originally titled Gimli Saga, after the amateur history book produced locally by various Icelandic members of the community of Gimli (Maddin himself has Icelandic ancestry).

Maddin's aunt Lil had recently retired from hairdressing, and allowed Maddin to use her beauty salon, which was also Maddin's childhood home, as a makeshift film studio. Lil appears in the film briefly as a "bedside vigil-sitter in one quick shot [taken] just a couple of days before she died" at the age of 85. After Maddin's mother sold the house, Maddin completed the remaining shots of the film at various locations, including his own home, over a period of eighteen months. Maddin received a grant from the Manitoba Arts Council for CA$20,000 (equivalent to CA$46,124 in 2025), and often cites that figure as the film's budget, although he has also estimated the actual budget to have been between CA$14,000 and CA$30,000.

Although Tales from the Gimli Hospital upset some of the residents of Gimli, who believed that the film made light of the historical smallpox epidemic that ravaged the community, and was rejected by the Toronto Film Festival, it became a cult success and established Maddin's reputation in independent film circles. The film garnered the attention of Ben Barenholtz, who had successfully distributed other cult films such as John Waters' Pink Flamingos and David Lynch's Eraserhead. Tales from the Gimli Hospital consequently succeeded on the festival circuit and screened for a year as a midnight movie at a theatre in New York's Greenwich Village. Maddin received a Genie award nomination for Best Original Screenplay.

=== Archangel, Careful, and Twilight of the Ice Nymphs (1989–1997) ===
Maddin's second feature, Archangel (1990), fictionalizes historical conflict related to the Bolshevik Revolution occurring in the Arkhangelsk region of Russia, a concept introduced to Maddin by John Harvie. In the film, Boles, a Canadian soldier suffering from amnesia, arrives in the town of Archangel as World War I is ending. Due to the Bolshevik uprising, it appears as if the townspeople have, like Boles, contracted amnesia and forgotten that the war is over. Boles confuses the warrior-woman Veronkha with his lost love Iris and pursues her throughout the fighting. Kyle McCulloch stars as Boles. The film marks Maddin's first formal collaboration with fellow screenwriter George Toles.

Maddin shot Archangel in black-and-white on 16 mm film, on a budget of CA$430,000. Maddin modeled the film on the style of the part-talkie genre. Film critic J. Hoberman praised the film, and noted that "Maddin's most distinctive trait is an uncanny ability to exhume and redeploy forgotten cinematic conventions." Archangel premiered at the Toronto Film Festival, and in 1991 was awarded Best Experimental Film by the National Society of Film Critics.

Maddin's third feature, Careful (1992), was styled after another early cinema genre, the German mountain film. Maddin was ordered by the producers to shoot in colour, and so Careful became Maddin's first colour film, shot on 16 mm film with a budget of CA$1.1 million (equivalent to CA$2,150,238 in 2025). The colour style of the film emulated the two-colour Technicolor movies of the early 1930s. Kyle McCulloch again starred, alongside Brent Neale and Ross McMillan. At one point, Martin Scorsese had agreed to act in the film as Count Knotkers, but bowed out to complete Cape Fear. Maddin pursued casting hockey player Bobby Hull, but ended up casting Paul Cox.

Careful, also co-written by George Toles, is set in the mountain town of Tolzbad, where the townspeople are forced to repress their behaviour pathologically, since the slightest expression of emotion can trigger an avalanche. Brothers Grigorss (McCulloch) and Johann (Neale) seem secure in futures as butlers, but Johann becomes incestuously obsessed with their widowed mother, which drives him away from his fiancé and towards suicide. Grigorss, who is in love with Klara, begins to work for Count Knotkers, who is also in love with Grigorss' mother. Klara convinces Grigorss to duel the Count, resulting in the death of his mother, Klara's father, Klara, and Grigorss himself. Careful premiered at the New York Film Festival and, although it was not a commercial success elsewhere, "single-handedly saved a struggling art-house cinema in Missoula, Montana," where "sell-out crowds had filled the house twice every night for two weeks."

For his next feature film, written by Toles, Maddin attempted to make an operetta called The Dikemaster's Daughter "set in a nineteenth-century Holland populated almost entirely by opera singers and dike-building navvies" about "a short-lived romance between the titular daughter and a fey opera singer." The singer is killed and the daughter is forced to marry a dike-builder, who is also killed. A local alchemist then constructs an automaton copy of the latter, which the daughter succeeds in having implanted with two hearts (of both her opera singer lover and her dike-builder husband) and a lever that switches control of the mechanical body between the two hearts. The movie was to feature Christopher Lee and Leni Riefenstahl, but Telefilm Canada "declared the project a 'lateral move'" for Maddin and the movie could not secure enough funding, so it was aborted.

Maddin consequently considered moving to Los Angeles to become a director-for-hire. He met with Claudia Lewis, who worked for Fox Searchlight, but did not like the projects he was offered. In 1995, Maddin directed the TV film The Hands of Ida (which he "later repudiated"). He also directed the short film Odilon Redon, or The Eye Like a Strange Balloon Mounts Toward Infinity (which was commissioned by the BBC and won a Special Jury Citation at the Toronto International Film Festival). In 1995, Maddin also became the youngest recipient ever of the Telluride Film Festival's Lifetime Achievement Award.

Maddin's fourth feature, also scripted by Toles and inspired by the novel Pan by Knut Hamsun, was Twilight of the Ice Nymphs (1997), his second feature film in colour and his first shot in 35 mm, on a budget of CA$1.5 million (equivalent to CA$2,724,558 in 2025). Set in the fictional land of Mandragora, where the sun does not set, a newly released convict returns to his family's ostrich farm and is embroiled in romantic complications involving a statue of Venus. Twilight of the Ice Nymphs featured Shelley Duvall and Frank Gorshin; the film's star, Nigel Whitmey, had his name removed from the film's credits after Maddin chose to remove Whitmey's voice from the film and replace it with Ross McMillan's.

As seen in Noam Gonick's documentary Waiting for Twilight, Maddin was dissatisfied with the filmmaking process due to creative interference from his producers, considering quitting making films. He continued to make short films, music videos (including the video for "It's a Wonderful Life" by Sparklehorse), and advertisements.

=== The Heart of the World, Dracula: Pages from a Virgin's Diary, The Saddest Music in the World (1998–2003) ===
During his break from making feature films, Maddin began teaching film classes at the University of Manitoba, where he met and mentored filmmaker Deco Dawson. Impressed with Dawson's short films, Maddin hired Dawson to work on a short film for the Toronto International Film Festival. Maddin was one of a number of directors commissioned to make four-minute short films that would screen prior to the various feature films at the 2000 festival. After hearing rumours that other directors were planning films with a small number of shots, Maddin decided that his film would instead contain over a hundred shots per minute, and enough plot for a feature-length film. Maddin then wrote and shot The Heart of the World (2000) in the style of Russian constructivism, taking the commission at its face value as a call to produce a propaganda film. The plot of The Heart of the World concerns two brothers, Osip and Nikolai, who compete for the love of the same woman: Anna, a state scientist studying Earth's core. Anna discovers that the heart of the world is in danger of a fatal heart attack (which would mean the end of the world). Nikolai is a mortician and tries to impress Anna with assembly-line embalming, while Osip is an actor playing Christ in the Passion Play and tries to impress Anna through his suffering. Anna is instead seduced by an evil capitalist, but has a change of heart and strangles the plutocrat, then slides down into the heart of the world, where she manages to save the world from destruction by transforming into cinema itself, the world's "new and better heart." The Heart of the World won the 2001 Genie Award for Best Short and the 2001 National Society of Film Critics Award for Best Experimental Film.

The success of The Heart of the World marked the beginning of a productive period for Maddin, who produced five feature films within the following eight years. Maddin's next feature, Dracula: Pages from a Virgin's Diary (2002), was his last collaboration with Deco Dawson, who was credited as editor and associate director. Maddin and Dawson had a falling-out in the wake of the production, although Dawson spoke kindly of Maddin's following feature, The Saddest Music in the World. Dracula: Pages from a Virgin's Diary was budgeted at $1.7-million and produced for the Canadian Broadcasting Corporation (CBC) as a dance film documenting a performance by the Royal Winnipeg Ballet adapting Bram Stoker's novel Dracula. Maddin elected to shoot the dance film in a fashion uncommon for such films, using close-ups and jump cuts. Maddin stayed close to the source material, emphasizing the xenophobia in the reactions of the main characters to Dracula (played by Zhang Wei-Qiang in Maddin's film). The resulting film was greeted with critical acclaim, with an 84% average rating on Metacritic and an 88% rating on Rotten Tomatoes. Roger Ebert gave the film 3½ stars out of 4, writing that it was "jolting to see a film that deals with a familiar story, but looks like no other." Dracula: Pages from a Virgin's Diary won first prize (Prague D'Or) at the 2002 Golden Prague Television Festival, two 2002 Gemini Awards for Best Canadian Performing Arts Show and Best Direction, and a 2002 International Emmy Award for Best Arts Programming. Originally a television feature, Dracula: Pages from a Virgin's Diary was released theatrically in 2003.

Maddin's next feature, The Saddest Music in the World (2003), was budgeted at $3.8-million and shot over 24 days. The film was Maddin's first collaboration with Isabella Rossellini, who subsequently appeared in a number of Maddin's films and co-created a film with him about her father Roberto Rossellini. The film also starred Mark McKinney, Maria de Medeiros, David Fox, and Ross McMillan. Maddin and co-writer Toles based the film on an original screenplay written by novelist Kazuo Ishiguro, from which they kept "the title, the premise and the contest – to determine which country's music was the saddest" but otherwise re-wrote. The action of The Saddest Music in the World centres around a contest run by Beer Baroness Lady Port-Huntley (Rossellini) to discover which country has the saddest music in the world. Chester Kent (McKinney), a failed Broadway producer, returns home to Winnipeg and competes with his father Fyodor (Fox) and brother Roderick (McMillan) to win the contest and its $25,000 prize. It's discovered that Chester's girlfriend, Narcissa (de Medeiros) was Roderick's wife but forgot this due to amnesia resulting from the death of their son. Chester reunites with Port-Huntley, his former lover, who lost her legs in a car accident. Fyodor, who is in love with Port-Huntley, has built prosthetic legs for her out of glass, which she loves although she spurns Fyodor, leading to his drunken death. As the contest proceeds, things end tragically. The Saddest Music in the World won a number of awards, including three Genie Awards (Best Achievement in Costume Design; Best Achievement in Editing; and Best Achievement in Music, Original Score); Maddin was also nominated for Best Achievement in Direction. Maddin a nomination for Best Direction in a Feature Film from the Directors Guild of Canada, which awarded the film Outstanding Achievement in Feature Film Production Design. Maddin won the Film Discovery Jury Award for Best Director at the U.S. Comedy Arts Festival.

=== Cowards Bend the Knee, Brand Upon the Brain!, My Winnipeg (2003–2007) ===
While in pre-production on The Saddest Music in the World, Maddin directed Cowards Bend the Knee (2003), shooting entirely on Super 8 film with a budget of $30,000. It was developed as a series of short films, commissioned as part of an installation art project by Toronto art gallery The Power Plant that was curated by Philip Monk. These 10 short films, collected together, constituted a short feature. Cowards Bend the Knee is the first in Maddin's autobiographical "Me Trilogy" of feature films starring protagonists named Guy Maddin, the others being Brand upon the Brain! (2006) and My Winnipeg (2007). Cowards Bend the Knee concerns the murderous young "Guy Maddin" (played by Darcy Fehr), a hockey player whose forgets his lover as she dies from complications during an illegal abortion. Guy starts a love affair with the daughter of the abortionist, who compels him to murder her mother to avenge the death of her father. Guy meanwhile falls in love with the ghost of his dead lover, not recognizing her, and competes with his own father for her affection. Maddin based the film's premise loosely on the Euripedes play Medea. Critic J. Hoberman of The Village Voice called the film "Maddin's masterpiece."

Maddin was next approached by the Seattle-based not-for-profit film production company The Film Company and offered a budget to make any film he wanted with complete freedom, as long as he shot it in Seattle with local actors. Maddin ended up producing Brand Upon the Brain! (2006) from a script co-written by Toles, shooting the film over nine days and editing it over three months with an estimated budget of $40,000. The plot concerns "Guy Maddin" (played by Erik Steffen Maahs as an adult, and Sullivan Brown as a child), whose domineering mother runs a lighthouse orphanage on an island where she and her husband perform scientific experiments upon the children in an effort to extend her youth. Brand Upon the Brain! was shot as a silent film, and premiered at the 2006 Toronto International Film Festival, where it was accompanied by a live orchestra, narrator, and foley artists. The film toured across North America in a similar fashion, with celebrity narrators including Crispin Glover and John Ashbery. The film's theatrical run featured narration by Isabella Rossellini.

In 2005, Maddin was presented with the Award of Distinction from the Manitoba Arts Council and in 2006, he received the Persistence of Vision Award from the San Francisco International Film Festival Roger Ebert wrote of his work: "For me, Maddin seems to penetrate to the hidden layers beneath the surface of the movies, revealing a surrealistic underworld of fears, fantasies and obsessions."

Maddin's next feature stemmed from a commission to produce a documentary film about his hometown of Winnipeg. Taking what he described as a "docufantasia" approach that melded "personal history, civic tragedy, and mystical hypothesizing," Maddin produced My Winnipeg (2008), with a budget of $500,000. Maddin again cast Darcy Fehr in the role of "Guy Maddin" and structured the documentary around a metafictional plot whereby "Guy Maddin" attempts to "film his way out" of the frozen city. Maddin rents out his former home and hires actors to play his family (including Ann Savage as his mother) in recreations of scenes from his youth. Along the way, Maddin documents facts and myths about Winnipeg, including the demolition of the Winnipeg hockey arena after the sale of the Winnipeg Jets, an epidemic of sleepwalking, the ghosts of frozen horse heads returning every winter when the rivers freeze over, and If Day (a faked Nazi invasion of the city mounted during World War II to promote war bonds). My Winnipeg received the award for Best Canadian Feature Film from the 2007 Toronto International Film Festival, Best Documentary from the 2008 San Francisco Film Critics Circle Awards, Best Canadian Film from the 2009 Toronto Film Critics Association Awards, and Best Experimental Documentary from the 2009 Tehran International Urban Film Festival. In 2007, Maddin also became the first artist-curator of the UCLA Film & Television Archive.

=== Keyhole, Hauntings, Seances, The Forbidden Room and The Green Fog (2008–2017) ===
Maddin got a commission for the opening of the Bell Lightbox cultural centre in Toronto, producing an installation series titled Hauntings based on reimaginings of known lost silent films by influential filmmakers which were destroyed or not produced.

Maddin shot his tenth feature film, Keyhole (2011), digitally. Filming began in Winnipeg on July 6, 2010. The film screened at the 2011 Toronto International Film Festival and the 2011 Whistler Film Festival, where it won the Best Canadian Film Award. In 2012, Keyhole screened at South by Southwest, the Independent Film Festival Boston, the Wisconsin Film Festival, Fantasporto, and the Berlin International Film Festival. The film was released theatrically in 2012. Keyhole stars Jason Patric as Ulysses Pick, a gangster who leads his gang to break into his former home and who journeys through the haunted house in a plot inspired by Homer's Odyssey, searching room-by-room to find his wife Hyacinth (Isabella Rossellini). The film was co-written by Maddin and Toles and also stars Udo Kier, Brooke Palsson, David Wontner, Louis Negin, and Kevin McDonald.

Also in 2011, Maddin participated in Performa 11 with Tales from the Gimli Hospital: Reframed, a live performance that re-frames the 1988 film. Maddin and composer Matthew Patton gathered a group of musicians to compose and perform the new score, which centered on Icelandic musician Kristín Anna Valtýsdóttir.

In 2012, Maddin produced an installation for the Winnipeg Art Gallery, Only Dream Things, for which he recreated his childhood bedroom and produced a short film by manipulating his family's home movies.

Maddin expanded the approach of his Hauntings installation into another film/installation project, Seances, which combines "a film shoot, an experience and an installation, which will subsequently become a film and an interactive work." Maddin started shooting Seances in 2012 in Paris, France, at the Centre Pompidou and continued shooting at the Phi Centre in Montreal, Quebec, Canada. Seances was launched online by the National Film Board of Canada in 2015 as an interactive web project that allows users to randomly generate a combination of the 100 short films.

Maddin and Evan Johnson also concurrently co-directed and shot a feature film titled The Forbidden Room with the same writers. Although often misreported as the same project, The Forbidden Room "is a feature film with its own separate story and stars." The Forbidden Room had its world premiere in January 2015 at the Sundance Film Festival.

Maddin's next feature film, The Green Fog (2017), premiered at the San Francisco International Film Festival on April 16, 2017. The film features a score by composer Jacob Garchik, performed by the Kronos Quartet, and is a collage-film, "a reimagining of the Hitchcock classic Vertigo, made entirely from archival TV and film footage shot in San Francisco."

== Installations ==
Maddin's installations generally include short films screened in unusual fashions, and draw on both his life and on the history of cinema.

=== Cowards Bend the Knee (2003) ===
Maddin was commissioned by The Power Plant gallery in Toronto and, in an installation curated by Philip Monk, produced a series of ten short films. The exhibition premiered at the 42nd International Film Festival Rotterdam from January 22 to February 2, 2003, where the catalogue described it as a "firstofitskind, tenpart peephole installation jampacked with enough kinetically photographed action to seem like a neverending cliffhanger." Each six-minute film is viewed through a peephole and together present a fictionalised autobiography, whose main character (named "Guy Maddin") is embroiled in illegal abortion, murder, sexual rivalry, and hockey. The installation was also exhibited at The Power Plant from March 22 to May 25, 2003. A literary screenplay for the film was published by the gallery and the short films were collected together as a feature film.

=== Hauntings (2010) ===
Maddin was commissioned to produce an installation for the opening of the Toronto International Film Festival's Bell Lightbox, and configured eleven screens to show a series of original short films. The films consisted of reimagined films by famous directors that have been lost, destroyed, or unrealized. The installation was also exhibited at Winnipeg's Platform Gallery from September 2 to October 2, 2011, for the WNDX Festival of Moving Image and at Concordia University's Faculty of Fine Arts Gallery from June 1–10, 2012.

=== Only Dream Things (2012) ===
For a 2012 installation at the Winnipeg Art Gallery, Maddin re-created his teenage bedroom. On the wall of the re-created bedroom plays a 19-minute short film Maddin produced by digitally distressing his family's home movies.

=== Seances (2012–2015) ===
For Maddin's film/installation project Seances, the film shoots were open to the public and streamed online, and thereby presented as live art installation projects. Other writers on the project included Evan Johnson, Robert Kotyk, Kim Morgan, and John Ashbery. In 2015, Maddin and the National Film Board of Canada released Seances as an interactive project online.

== Books ==
=== From the Atelier Tovar: Selecting Writings (2003) ===
Maddin's first book contains selected "journalism, treatments for films made and unmade and [...] selection[s] from the director's [...] personal journals" and also "candid photos and unpublished storyboards." The book is introduced by film critic Mark Peranson and published by Coach House Books.

It features reviews of a variety of films including Minority Report and Seven Samurai, an article on the making of The Saddest Music in the World, and writing on Bollywood melodramas. The book contains four film treatments, for the short films The Eye, Like a Strange Balloon, Mounts Towards Infinity; and Maldoror: Tygers; for the feature film Careful; and for an unmade film called The Child Without Qualities, an autobiographical work that reads like an experimental short story.

=== Cowards Bend the Knee (2003) ===
Maddin wrote a treatment for the feature film Cowards Bend the Knee, which he published as a book through The Power Plant, the gallery in Toronto that commissioned the installation for which Maddin produced the series of short films that collectively make up the feature film.

The book contains a foreword by Wayne Baerwaldt and an introduction by Philip Monk, who also edited the book and curated Maddin's installation. The main text is followed by an interview with Guy Maddin conducted by Robert Enright. The book also contains stills from the film and a list of credits for the film.

Most of the text is Maddin's treatment for the film, which follows the same plot. The story is a fictional "autobiography [that] features a diabolical plot surrounding a coward on a mission [named Guy Maddin] that resembles a cycle of dark spectacles dressed up as, among other things, lewd seduction, Canadian hockey, murder, amputations, hair design, general mayhem, fetish attractions and heartfelt loss." In the interview with Enright, Maddin notes that the book's genesis began with his intention to clarify the narrative of his films, and that he was inspired by Medea.

=== My Winnipeg (2009) ===
Maddin also released a book titled My Winnipeg (Coach House Books, 2009). Maddin's book contains the film's narration as a main text surrounded by annotations, including outtakes, marginal notes and digressions, production stills, family photos, and miscellaneous material.

The book contains a map of Winnipeg by artist Marcel Dzama featuring fictional attractions such as the Giant Squid of the Red; various poster designs for the film; and short articles about working with Maddin by Andy Smetanka, Darcy Fehr, and Caelum Vatnsdal. It also includes an angry e-mail from an ex-girlfriend, collages and notebooks pages, and an X-ray of the dog from the film. The book also contains an interview with Maddin's mother conducted by Ann Savage and an interview with Maddin conducted by Michael Ondaatje.

== Awards and honours ==
In 1995, Maddin became the youngest person to receive the Telluride Film Festival's Medal for Lifetime Achievement. He received the Queen Elizabeth II Golden Jubilee Medal in 2002.

Maddin was named the recipient of the Manitoba Arts Council's 2005 Award of Distinction, which recognized his artistic achievements and contribution to Manitoba's film industry. He received the $30,000 award at a ceremony in March 2006. That year, he also received the San Francisco International Film Festival's Persistence of Vision Award.

He received the Provincetown International Film Festival's Filmmaker on the Edge Award in 2009 and the Canada Council's Bell Award in Video Art in 2010.

In 2012, Maddin was appointed a Member of the Order of Canada for his contributions to film and his teaching of younger filmmakers. He is also a member of the Order of Manitoba.

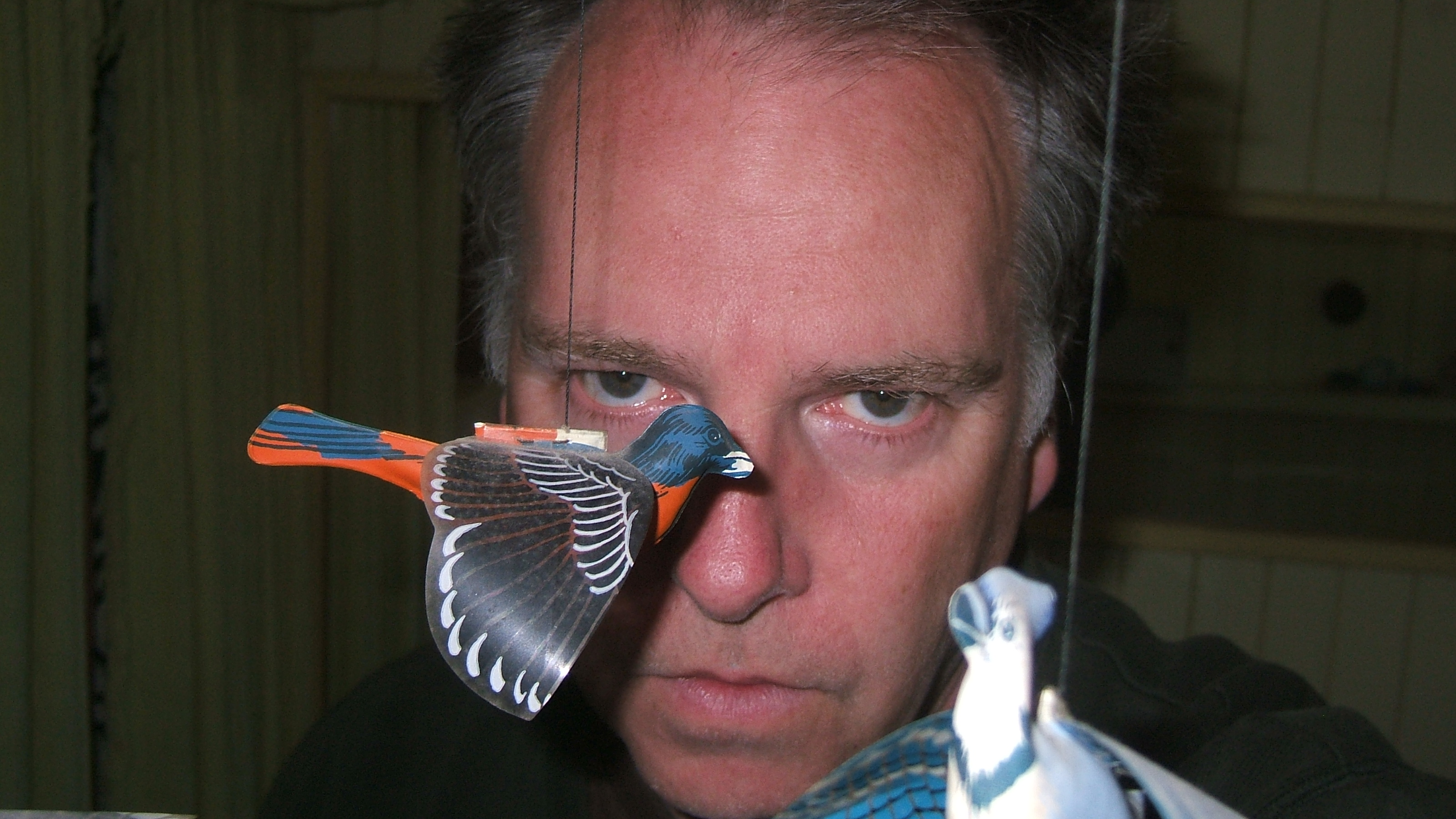
Maddin in 2008

=== Film awards ===
- 1991: Archangel won the National Society of Film Critics' award for Best Experimental Film.
- 1995: Odilon Redon, or The Eye Like a Strange Balloon Mounts Toward Infinity received a Special Jury Citation at the Toronto International Film Festival.
- 2000: The Heart of the World won the National Society of Film Critics' award for Best Experimental Film. The film also won a Genie Award for Best Live Action Short Drama.
- 2002: Dracula: Pages from a Virgin's Diary won the International Emmy Award for Best Arts Programming and the Grand Prix, the top prize at the Golden Prague Television Festival. It also won the Gemini Award for Best Performing Arts Program or Series. Maddin received a separate Gemini for directing the film.
- 2004: Maddin won the Film Discovery Jury Award for Best Director at the U.S. Comedy Arts Festival for The Saddest Music in the World.
- 2007: My Winnipeg won Best Canadian Feature Film at the Toronto International Film Festival.
- 2008: My Winnipeg won the Toronto Film Critics Association's Rogers Best Canadian Film Award, presented in January 2009. It was also named Best Documentary by the San Francisco Film Critics Circle.
- 2011: Keyhole won the Borsos Award for Best Canadian Feature Film at the Whistler Film Festival.
- 2018: The Green Fog, directed by Maddin, Evan Johnson and Galen Johnson, won the Golden Lady Harimaguada, the top prize at the Las Palmas de Gran Canaria International Film Festival. It also received the Los Angeles Film Critics Association's Douglas Edwards Experimental/Independent Film/Video Award.

== Filmography ==
=== Feature films ===
Year	Title	Notes
1988	Tales from the Gimli Hospital	
1990	Archangel	
1992	Careful	
1997	Twilight of the Ice Nymphs	
2002	Dracula, Pages From a Virgin's Diary	
2003	Cowards Bend the Knee	
2003	The Saddest Music in the World	
2006	Brand Upon the Brain!	
2007	My Winnipeg	
2011	Keyhole	
2015	The Forbidden Room	Co-directed by Evan Johnson
2017	The Green Fog	Co-directed by Evan Johnson and Galen Johnson
2024	Rumours	Co-directed by Evan Johnson and Galen Johnson

=== Short films ===
Year	Title	Notes
1985	The Dead Father	
1989	Mauve Decade	
1989	BBB	
1990	Tyro	
1991	Indigo High-Hatters	
1993	The Pomps of Satan	
1994	Sea Beggars or The Weaker Sex	
1994	Sissy Boy Slap Party	Lost film; recreated in 2004.
1995	Odilon Redon, or The Eye Like a Strange Balloon Mounts Toward Infinity	
1995	The Hands of Ida	* Maddin has since disowned this film
1996	Imperial Orgies or The Rabbi of Bacharach	
1997	Chimney Workbook	
1997	Zookeeper Workbook	
1997	Rooster Workbook	
1998	The Hoyden or Idylls of Womanhood	
1998	The Cock Crew or Love-Chaunt of the Chimney	
1998	Maldoror: Tygers	
1999	Hospital Fragment	
2000	Fleshpots of Antiquity	
2000	The Heart of the World	
2002	Fancy, Fancy Being Rich	
2004	A Trip to the Orphanage	
2004	Sombra Dolorosa	
2004	Sissy Boy Slap Party	Recreation of his lost 1994 film.
2005	FuseBoy	
2005	My Dad Is 100 Years Old	
2006	Nude Caboose	
2006	Odin's Shield Maiden	
2008	Spanky: To the Pier and Back	
2008	Berlin	
2008	It's My Mother's Birthday Today	
2008	Collage Party	
2008	Footsteps	
2008	Glorious	
2009	Send Me to the 'Lectric Chair	* Co-directed by Isabella Rossellini
2009	Night Mayor	
2009	The Little White Cloud That Cried	
2010	The Brute	
2010	The Devil Bear	
2010	Satanas Part 3	
2010	The Divine Woman	
2010	Clouds Like White Sheep	
2010	Hubby Does the Washing	
2010	Lilith & Ly	
2010	The Brian Sinclair Story	
2010	Out of College	
2010	A Woman of the Sea	
2010	Bing & Bela	
2012	How to Take a Bath	* Written by John Ashbery
2015	Bring Me the Head of Tim Horton	* Co-directed with Evan Johnson
2018	Accidence	* Co-directed with Evan Johnson and Galen Johnson
2020	Stump the Guesser	* Co-directed with Evan Johnson and Galen Johnson
2020	The Rabbit Hunters	* Co-directed with Evan Johnson and Galen Johnson
