= Emmanuel Leconte =

French actor (born 1982)

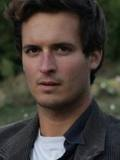
- Emmanuel Leconte, 2014
- Born: 11 October 1982 (age 43); Paris, France

Emmanuel Leconte (born 11 October 1982; Paris, France) is a French actor.

He is best known for his role as King Francis I in the television hit series The Tudors. He has also starred in: Monsieur Max (2007), La Ravisseuse (2005), and À tout de suite (2004). Emmanuel is the son of French director and producer, Daniel Leconte.

In 2008, he appeared in BBC2 comedy series The Cup, as French football coach Raymond Mercier.

In 2015 he directed the documentary film Je suis Charlie.
