= Steven McCarthy (actor) =

Canadian actor and filmmaker

Steven McCarthy is a Canadian actor and filmmaker from Sault Ste. Marie, Ontario. He is most noted for his three-time guest role as Morgan in the television series Mary Kills People, for which he won the Canadian Screen Award for Best Performance in a Guest Role in a Drama Series at the 6th Canadian Screen Awards in 2018.

He attended the National Theatre School of Canada on two occasions, studying acting in the 1990s and directing in the 2000s. His first major directing project was a production of Olivier Choinière's play Bliss for Buddies in Bad Times in 2012.

His other roles have included the films Eye of the Beholder, An Insignificant Harvey, Citizen Gangster, Picture Day, and O Negative, and episodes of the television series Degrassi: The Next Generation, Good Dog, Good God, Defiance, Copper, The Strain, Crawford, The Expanse, and Barkskins.

He was the co-writer of We Forgot to Break Up, and the writer and director of O Negative.

He and Amanda Brugel received a Canadian Screen Award nomination for Best Host in a Web Program or Series at the 10th Canadian Screen Awards in 2022, for their cohosting of the 2021 Canadian Alliance of Film and Television Costume Arts and Design awards.

== Filmography ==
Year	Title	Role	Notes
1999	Eye of the Beholder	Paul Hugo	
2000	Isn't She Great	Book Nook Clerk	
2000	The Skulls	Sweeney	
2002	Steal	Frank	
2007	Dead Mary	Baker	Credited as Steve McCarthy
2008	Eating Buccaneers	Stewart	
2011	Citizen Gangster	Jail Reporter	
2011	An Insignificant Harvey	Lucas Harold	
2012	Picture Day	Jim	
2015	The Steps	Keith	
2015	O Negative	The Man	Short film; also director, writer, executive producer, and producer
2016	Joseph & Mary	Rabbi Elijah	
2017	The Definites	Alex	
2017	We Forgot to Break Up	Angus MacQueen	Short film; also writer
2018	Rape Card	Miles	Short film
2019	Togo	Dev Burdett	
2019	Chubby	Uncle Jody	Short film
2020	Pieces of a Woman	Photographer	
2020	Dear Jesus	Priest	Short film
2021	V/H/S/94	Jimmy	Segment: "Terror"
2022	The End of Sex	Gary	
2023	Dark Harvest	Coach Nelson	
2025	The Dogs	Frank McTavish	
2025	The Well	Walter	World premiere at the 29th Fantasia International Film Festival
2025	Thin Walls	Kurt	Short film
