= Mutum (film) =

2007 film by Sandra Kogut

- Directed by: Sandra Kogut
- Screenplay by: Ana Luiza Martins Costa; Sandra Kogut
- Based on: novelCampo Geral by J. Guimarães Rosa
- Produced by: Laurent Lavolé; Isabelle Pragier; Flávio R. Tambellini
- Cinematography: Mauro Pinheiro Jr.
- Edited by: Sérgio Mekler
- Production companies: Ravina Filmes; Gloria Films
- Distributed by: VideoFilmes (Brazil); Pierre Grise Distribution (France); Global Film Initiative (North America); Teleview International (Middle East)
- Release date: May 25, 2007 (Cannes Film Festival)
- Running time: 95 minutes
- Countries: Brazil; France
- Language: Portuguese

Mutum is a 2007 joint Brazilian/French drama film directed and co-written by Sandra Kogut. The script, developed by Kogut and Ana Luísa Martins Costa, is loosely based on Guimarães Rosa's novella Campo Geral. The story takes place on an isolated farm in Mutum, in the sertão of Minas Gerais. The film represented Kogut's fiction feature debut.

== Production ==
Wishing to create a fictional storyline based upon real world experiences, "Kogut spent more than a year in the Brazilian countryside, getting to know local farmers and their families' and then chose to cast her film from those communities. As they were inexperienced, the lead child actors' own names were used was to make character identification easier for them.

== Plot ==
Thiago (Thiago da Silva Mariz) and his family live on a remote farm in the isolated backlands of Minas Gerais, Brazil. The family consists of his brutish father (João Miguel), his weak and ineffectual mother (Izadora Fernandes), his friendly Uncle Terez (Romulus Braga), his grandmother (Maria das Graças Leal Macedo), and his four siblings - Felipe (Wallison Felipe Leal Barroso), Juliana (Maria Juliana Souza de Oliveira), Brenda (Brenda Luana Rodrigues Lima), and João (João Vitor Leal Barroso). During an intense argument between his mother and father, Thiago cringes as his father accuses her of infidelity. Later, grandmother bans Uncle Terez from the family home. His brother Felipe hurts his foot, and through lacking proper medical care, he gets sick and dies. His Uncle later confides that his father has killed a neighbor. Thiago is forced to confront separations and betrayal within the home, and slowly begins to understand as he faces and lets go of his childhood innocence.

== Cast ==
- Thiago da Silva Mariz as Thiago
- Wallison Felipe Leal Barroso as Felipe
- Maria Juliana Souza de Oliveira as Juliana
- Brenda Luana Rodrigues Lima as Brenda
- João Vitor Leal Barroso as João Vitor
- João Miguel as Le père
- Izadora Fernandes as La mère
- Rômulo Braga as Oncle Terez
- Paula Regina Sampaio da Silva as Rosa
- Maria das Graças Leal Macedo as La grand-mère
- Pedro Trovão as Vacher Jé
- Flavio Bauraqui as Seu Deográcias
- Raimundo Nonato Soares da Silva as Luisaltino
- Eduardo Moreira as Homme de la ville
- Onilo José de Souza as Vacher Onilo
- Wellington Fernando de Aguiar as Fernando

With the exception of João Miguel, Izadora Fernandes, Rômulo Braga and Eduardo Moreira, the cast is composed of non-professional actors chosen by the director and scriptwriter from inhabitants of the sertão of Minas Gerais, where filming took place.

== Release ==
Mutum was well-received at multiple film festivals worldwide and was eventually released in the United States as part of the Global Lens series, a series set to showcase international cinema and promote cross-cultural understanding.

== Reception ==
Abus de Ciné felt the film captured the beauty and simplicity of childhood, and they praised Kogut's choice of using non-professionals in the roles of the children. They wrote the film Mutum was "a simple and authentic portrait of the lives of the Brazilian countryside, seen through the eyes of children, the pure vision we can take from this world to the raw beauty." Geo Euzebio of Tele Cine was positive in her review and gave the film 9 out of 10 stars. The adaptation of Campo Geral by J. Guimarães Rosa was modified by director Kogut. She found the original work sounded mechanical when recited by the actors, so she adapted the script and dialog to be based upon her own research and truer to the lives of the non-actors and the area in which they lived.

=== Awards and nominations ===
- 1995, won 'Main Prize' at International Short Film Festival Oberhausen for En français
- 1998, won 'Special mention' at Marseille Festival of Documentary Film for Adieu monde ou l'histoire de Pierre et Claire
- 1998, won 'Silver Dove for Short Footage' at Leipzig DOK Festival for Adieu monde ou l'histoire de Pierre et Claire
- 1999, won 'Prize of the Catholic Filmwork Germany' at International Short Film Festival Oberhausen for Adieu monde ou l'histoire de Pierre et Claire
- 1999, won 'Prize of the Ministry for Development, Culture and Sports' at International Short Film Festival Oberhausen for Adieu monde ou l'histoire de Pierre et Claire
- 2004, nominated for Grand Prize for 'Best Documentary' at Cinema Brazil Grand Prize for Un passeport Hongrois
- 2004, nominated for ACIE Award for 'Best Documentary' from Associação dos Correspondentes de Imprensa Estrangeira at ACIE Awards, Brazil for Un passeport Hongrois
- 2007, won Silver Precolumbian Circle for Best Feature Film at Bogota Film Festival for Mutum
- 2007, won Feisal Award at Bogota Film Festival for Mutum
- 2007, received Critics' Award at Bogota Film Festival for Mutum
- 2007, nominated for Caméra d'Or at Cannes Film Festival for Mutum
- 2007, won Prize of the Ecumenical Jury Special Mention at Molodist International Film Festival for Mutum
- 2007, won Première Brazil for "best Film' at Rio de Janeiro International Film Festival for Mutum
- 2008, nominated for Grand Prize for 'Best Screenplay' at Cinema Brazil Grand Prize for Mutum
- 2008, won Coxiponé Award for 'Best Director' at Cuiabá Film and Video Festival for Mutum
- 2008, won Dioraphte Award at Rotterdam International Film Festival for Mutum
- 2008, won Silver Daisy at Silver Daisy Awards, Brazil for Mutum
- 2008, won Coxiponé Award for 'Best Film' at Cuiabá Film and Video Festival for Mutum
- 2008, won Coxiponé Award for 'Best Screenplay' at Cuiabá Film and Video Festival for Mutum
- 2008, won Grand Coral for 'First Work' at Havana Film Festival for Mutum
- 2008, won Crystal Lens for 'Best Director' at Miami Brazilian Film Festival for Mutum
- 2008, won Jury Award for 'best Film at Paris Brazilian Film Festival for Mutum
- 2008, won 'Deutsches Kinderhilfswerk Special Mention' at Berlin International Film Festival for Mutum
- 2008, nominated for ACIE Award for 'Best Film' from Associação dos Correspondentes de Imprensa Estrangeira at ACIE Awards, Brazil for Mutum
- 2008, nominated for ACIE Award for 'Best Director' from Associação dos Correspondentes de Imprensa Estrangeira at ACIE Awards, Brazil for Mutum
