= Sandra Kogut =

Brazilian filmmaker (born 1965)

- Born: 1965 (age 60–61); Rio de Janeiro, Brazil
- Education: Catholic University of Rio de Janeiro
- Occupations: Documentarian; Filmmaker; Video artist
- Years active: 1984-present
- Known for: Paralamas do Sucesso; Campo Grande
- Notable work: Mutum
- Spouse: Thomas Levin
- Children: 2

Sandra Kogut (born 1965) is a Brazilian filmmaker whose works transition between documentary and narrative fiction. She first received international attention for her 1991 documentary Paralamas do Sucesso. Kogut has taught at universities around the world and has worked for Brazilian and European broadcasters. Her debut feature film project was Mutum in 2007. She is more recently known for Campo Grande (2015), which had its premiere in the Contemporary World Cinema section of the 2015 Toronto International Film Festival.

== Background ==
Kogut is of Hungarian descent and was born in Rio de Janeiro in 1965. She spent more than ten years living in France, before moving to the United States. She graduated in philosophy from the Catholic University of Rio de Janeiro, and began her career as a performance and installation artist in 1984. Among other venues, Her works have been shown at the Museum of Modern Art and Guggenheim Museum in New York City. Her grandparents migrated to Brazil from Hungary to avoid The Holocaust, and it was their experiences which inspired her film A Hungarian Passport.

== Filmography ==
- Paralamas do Sucesso (1988 documentary)
- Angola (1991)
- Parabolic People (1991)
- En français (1993)
- Here and There (Lá e Cá) (1995)
- Adiu monde or Pierre and Claire's Story (Adieu monde ou l'histoire de Pierre et Claire) (1998 documentary)
- Lecy e Humberto nos Campos Neutrais - Chuí - Chuy (1999)
- A Hungarian Passport (Un passeport Hongrois) (2001 documentary)
- Passengers of Orsay (Passagers d'Orsay) (2002)
- Mutum (2007)
- Campo Grande (2015)
- Three Summers (2019)

== Recognition ==
While Kogut was residing in Paris, France, Harvard Film Archive wrote of her works being archived by their Carpenter Center for the Visual Arts and stated that she "has emerged as one of the most distinctive cultural filmmakers at work today. Her films are by turns whimsical, lyrical, and finely ironic—lighthearted and playful, yet also momentous and serious."

=== Awards and nominations ===
- 1995, won 'Main Prize' at International Short Film Festival Oberhausen for En français
- 1998, won 'Special mention' at Marseille Festival of Documentary Film for Adieu monde ou l'histoire de Pierre et Claire
- 1998, won 'Silver Dove for Short Footage' at Leipzig DOK Festival for Adieu monde ou l'histoire de Pierre et Claire
- 1999, won 'Prize of the Catholic Filmwork Germany' at International Short Film Festival Oberhausen for Adieu monde ou l'histoire de Pierre et Claire
- 2007, won Silver Precolumbian Circle for Best Feature Film at Bogota Film Festival for Mutum
- 2007, won Feisal Award at Bogota Film Festival for Mutum
- 2007, received Critics' Award at Bogota Film Festival for Mutum
- 2007, won Prize of the Ecumenical Jury Special Mention at Molodist International Film Festival for Mutum
- 2007, won Première Brazil for "best Film' at Rio de Janeiro International Film Festival for Mutum
- 2008, won Coxiponé Award for 'Best Director' at Cuiabá Film and Video Festival for Mutum
- 2008, won Dioraphte Award at Rotterdam International Film Festival for Mutum
- 2008, won Silver Daisy at Silver Daisy Awards, Brazil for Mutum
- 2008, won Grand Coral for 'First Work' at Havana Film Festival for Mutum
- 2008, won Crystal Lens for 'Best Director' at Miami Brazilian Film Festival for Mutum
- 2008, won 'Deutsches Kinderhilfswerk Special Mention' at Berlin International Film Festival for Mutum
- 2008, nominated for ACIE Award for 'Best Film' from Associação dos Correspondentes de Imprensa Estrangeira at ACIE Awards, Brazil for Mutum
- 2008, nominated for ACIE Award for 'Best Director' from Associação dos Correspondentes de Imprensa Estrangeira at ACIE Awards, Brazil for Mutum
