= Galen Johnson (filmmaker) =

Canadian filmmaker

Galen Johnson is a Canadian filmmaker from Winnipeg, Manitoba, most noted for his frequent collaborations with Guy Maddin. He was a Canadian Screen Award nominee for Best Art Direction/ Production Design at the 4th Canadian Screen Awards in 2016 for his work on Maddin's The Forbidden Room.

He and his brother Evan Johnson were also codirectors of Maddin's short films Bring Me the Head of Tim Horton (2015), Seances (2016), The Green Fog (2017), Accidence (2018), Stump the Guesser (2020) and The Rabbit Hunters (2020), as well as the feature film Rumours (2024).

In 2020, Johnson released the experimental short film Thursday, which was shot entirely from his and Evan's bedroom windows during the lockdown phase of the COVID-19 pandemic in Canada.
