= WGN America =

American television network (1978–2021)

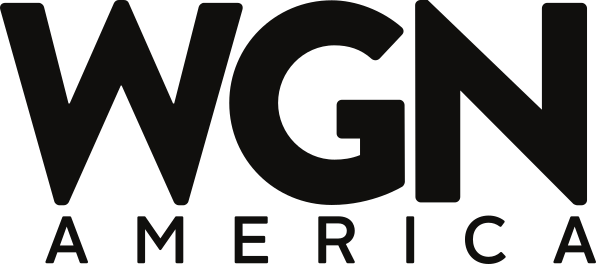
- Country: United States
- Broadcast area: Nationwide
- Network: The WB (1995–1999)
- Headquarters: WGN Studios, 2501 W Bradley Place, Chicago, Illinois

Programming
- Language: English
- Picture format: 1080i (HDTV) (downscaled to letterboxed 480i for the SDTV feed)

Ownership
- Owner: Tribune Media (1978–2019); Nexstar Media Group (2019–2021)
- Sister channels: WGN-TV; WGN (AM); Antenna TV

History
- Launched: November 9, 1978
- Closed: March 1, 2021
- Replaced by: NewsNation
- Former names: WGN (1978–2001); WGN Superstation (2001–2002); Superstation WGN (2002–2008); WGN America (2008–2021)

WGN America was an American subscription television network that operated from November 9, 1978, to February 28, 2021. The service was originally uplinked to satellite by United Video Inc. as a national feed of Chicago independent station WGN-TV, making the station's programming available to cable and satellite providers throughout the United States as the second nationally distributed "superstation" (after Atlanta station WTCG, now operating as the cable-originated TBS, which had become a national service almost two years earlier).

It maintained a nearly identical program schedule as the Chicago station, airing a variety of programming including films, syndicated series, programs intended for local broadcast in the Chicago market (including local newscasts, public affairs shows and children's programs), and sports (including Chicago Cubs and White Sox baseball, Chicago Bulls basketball, and regional collegiate events). By the 1990s, the WGN superstation feed began substituting some syndicated programs (and starting in 1996, selected sporting events) in accordance with syndication exclusivity rules implemented by the Federal Communications Commission (FCC) in January 1990 to reduce programming duplication between local and out-of-market television stations carried by local cable systems, and served as the national carrier of The WB (part-owned by WGN-TV founding owner Tribune Broadcasting, which would acquire the national feed from United Video in 2001) during the latter half of the decade.

WGN America was converted into a conventional basic cable network in December 2014, adding scripted original programs and removing WGN-TV's local programs from its schedule as well as making the network available on cable and satellite providers within the Chicago market. Nexstar Media Group acquired WGN America as part of its 2019 purchase of most of Tribune's assets, becoming the company's only wholly owned, national cable-originated network. The channel in its final form under the WGN branding ran a mixture of entertainment programs (consisting of comedy and drama series, and theatrical feature films) for most of the broadcast day and, beginning in March 2020, a straight-news format—via a daily national prime time newscast, NewsNation—during the evening and early overnight hours. Nexstar relaunched the network as NewsNation on March 1, 2021, eventually converting its entire schedule to a general news and discussion format in July 2024, as contracts for syndicated entertainment programs held over from the predecessor WGN America service (and originally purchased for the network by Tribune) expired.

== History ==
=== Early years ===
WGN America traces its origins to WGN-TV, a broadcast television station in Chicago, Illinois that began operating over VHF channel 9 on April 5, 1948, as the second commercial television station to sign on in both the Chicago market and the state of Illinois – after WBKB-TV (channel 4, now CBS owned-and-operated station WBBM-TV on channel 2), which began experimental operations as W9XBK in 1940 and converted into a commercially licensed independent station on September 6, 1946 – and the 19th commercial station to sign on in the United States. The station – which, until January 1948, had initially planned to use the call sign WGNA – was founded by WGN, Incorporated, the broadcasting subsidiary of the Chicago Tribune Company (owned by Robert R. McCormick, then the editor and publisher of the Chicago Tribune), which had also owned local radio stations WGN (720 AM) and WGNB (98.7 FM; frequency now occupied by WFMT). WGN America and its Chicago-based broadcast television and radio siblings borrow the three-letter "WGN" initialism from the "World's Greatest Newspaper" slogan used by the Tribune from August 29, 1911, until December 31, 1976. (The calls were initially obtained by the Tribune in 1924 for use on the former WDAP radio station, which it had then recently acquired from Zenith-Edgewater Beach Broadcasting, by permission of the owners of the then-under-construction SS Carl D. Bradley.)

Initial programming on WGN-TV consisted of local newscasts and various other local programs (including children's programs and music series), older feature films and sporting events from Chicago-area professional and collegiate teams (including Chicago Cubs baseball games, the only local sports franchise to have aired consistently on the station from launch until the station's broadcasting relationship with the Cubs concluded in September 2019). By the end of 1948, network programs from CBS (later shared with WBKB-TV, beginning in September 1949) and the DuMont Television Network joined the schedule; WGN served as a production hub for several DuMont programs during the late 1940s and the first half of the 1950s (including The Al Morgan Show, Chicagoland Mystery Players, The Music Show, They Stand Accused, Windy City Jamboree and Down You Go). CBS programming moved exclusively to the rechristened WBBM-TV in February 1953, upon completion of that station's sale to CBS by Balaban and Katz Broadcasting, then owned by United Paramount Theatres, which was in the process of merging with ABC and acquiring, by association, WENR-TV (channel 7, now WLS-TV). This left WGN-TV with the faltering DuMont until that network completed its operational wind-down in August 1956, at which time it became an independent station; at that time, off-network syndicated reruns (such as The Cisco Kid, Our Miss Brooks and My Little Margie) were added to the schedule.

Channel 9 originally maintained studio and transmitter facilities at the Chicago Daily News Building, on West Madison and North Canal Streets in downtown Chicago, before relocating to WGN Radio's main facility at the Centennial Building annex of the Tribune Tower on North Michigan Avenue in the city's Magnificent Mile district, which was refurbished to accommodate the television station, on January 25, 1950. The channel 9 transmitter was moved to the Prudential Building on East Randolph Street and North Michigan Avenue in January 1956. The station moved to a proprietary studio facility at the 95,000-square-foot (2.2-acre) WGN Mid-America Broadcast Center (later renamed the WGN Continental Broadcast Center and now simply referred to as WGN Studios) on West Bradley Place in Chicago's North Center community in June 1961. (It shared the Bradley Place studios with WGN Radio until the latter moved its operations to the Pioneer Court extension on North Michigan Avenue in 1986.) In May 1969, the main transmitter was moved to the west antenna tower of the John Hancock Center on North Michigan Avenue.

WGN-TV became most associated with its heavy schedule of sporting events, which, in addition to its signature Cubs telecasts, included Chicago White Sox baseball, Chicago Bulls basketball, Chicago Blackhawks hockey, and college football and basketball games from individual regional universities (including the University of Illinois, DePaul University and Notre Dame University) as well as Big Ten Conference schools, among other events in aired at various points over the years. The station was also known locally for its lineup of children's programs including Bozo's Circus (which became the most well-known iteration of the Bozo franchise through its local and, later, national popularity, featuring a mix of comedy sketches, circus acts, cartoon shorts and in-studio audience participation games), Ray Rayner and His Friends (a variety show which featured animated shorts, arts and crafts segments, animal and science segments and a viewer mail segment) and Garfield Goose and Friends (a series hosted by Frazier Thomas as the "prime minister" to the titular clacking goose who designated himself as "King of the United States," which is considered to be the longest running puppet show on local television) as well as a robust lineup of feature films (showing as many as four movies – one in the morning, and two to three films per night – each weekday, and between three and six movies per day on weekends).

Channel 9 was Chicago's leading independent station for much of the period between the early 1960s and the early 1990s, although it was briefly overtaken in this distinction from 1979 to 1981 by rival independent WFLD (channel 32, now a Fox owned-and-operated station), which forced WGN-TV parent subsidiary Tribune Broadcasting (previously known as the WGN Continental Broadcasting Company from 1956 until 1981) to initiate efforts to beef up the station's inventory of off-network syndicated programs and add product from the Tribune Company's upstart national syndication unit, Tribune Entertainment. Beginning in the mid-1970s, the WGN-TV signal began to be retransmitted via microwave relay to cable television systems in much of the central Midwestern United States, enabling the station to reach far beyond the Chicago television market and reach areas that lacked access to an entertainment-based independent station. By the fall of 1978, WGN-TV was being distributed to 574 cable systems – covering Western, Central and Southern Illinois and large swaths of Indiana, Wisconsin, Michigan, Minnesota, Iowa and Missouri – reaching an estimated 8.6 million subscribers.

=== As a superstation ===
==== WGN-TV goes national ====
On October 26, 1978, one day after the agency implemented an "open entry" policy for transponder resale carriers to feed distant television station signals to cable television systems, the Federal Communications Commission (FCC) granted authority to four common carrier satellite relay firms – Tulsa, Oklahoma-based Southern Satellite Systems and United Video Inc. (later United Video Satellite Group), Lansing, Michigan-based American Microwave & Communications and Milwaukee-based Midwestern Relay Company – to uplink the WGN-TV signal to satellite to cable television providers serving various locations throughout the 48 contiguous U.S. states. Southern Satellite Systems – founded in 1975 by Ted Turner and subsequently sold to former Western Union marketing executive Edward L. Taylor to comply with FCC rules prohibiting a common satellite carrier from having involvement in program origination – was the leading contender to uplink the WGN signal for availability to a nationwide audience, intending to make it the second independent station that the company distributed via satellite, after Turner's Atlanta, Georgia, independent station WTCG (soon WTBS), which SSS began redistributing to American cable and satellite systems in December 1976. However, in a memo released to provider clients on October 30, 1978, Taylor announced that Transponder 13 of Satcom 1 (which SSS had assigned to beam the signal to participating providers) had failed and that the communications satellite's operator, RCA American Communications (now SES after GE's sale of the former RCA Americom, purchased in the aftermath of its parent RCA, to Société Européenne des Satellites), had refused a request to assign it a new transponder unless Satellite Communications Systems (a joint venture between SSS and Holiday Inn) agreed to dismiss a lawsuit it filed against RCA on October 16 over retaining use of Satcom Transponder 18 after January 1, 1979.

On November 9, 1978, United Video Inc. – which stepped in to oversee uplink responsibilities in lieu of Southern Satellite Systems – uplinked the WGN-TV signal from a satellite relay facility in Monee, Illinois to the Satcom-3 communications satellite for redistribution to cable systems and C-band satellite providers throughout the United States. This resulted in WGN-TV joining the ranks of WTBS to become America's second national superstation and becoming the first of three independent stations to be redistributed on a national basis before the end of 1979: KTVU (now a Fox owned-and-operated station) in Oakland, California was uplinked by Satellite Communications Systems in December 1978 and WOR-TV (now MyNetworkTV owned-and-operated station WWOR-TV) in New York City was uplinked by Newhouse Newspapers subsidiary Eastern Microwave Inc. in April 1979. It was also the first Tribune-owned independent station to be distributed to a national pay television audience—United Video would later uplink WPIX (now a CW affiliate) in New York City in May 1984; Netlink began distributing KWGN-TV (now a CW affiliate) in Denver in October 1987; and Eastern Microwave began distributing KTLA (now a CW affiliate) in Los Angeles in February 1988—and the first superstation to be distributed by United Video—with WGN and WPIX being joined by Gaylord Broadcasting-owned KTVT (now a CBS owned-and-operated station) in Dallas–Fort Worth in July 1984 and, after it assumed retransmission rights from Eastern Microwave, KTLA in April 1988. (Although all three were intended for national distribution, WPIX, KTLA and KWGN have primarily been distributed within their respective regions of the United States; Dish Network made them all available nationally for those who subscribed to the provider's a la carte superstations tier prior to its decision to halt its sale to new subscribers in September 2013, while Netlink initially distributed KWGN as part of its "Denver 5" out-of-market package for C-band and 4DTV subscribers.)

By the end of its first week of national availability, the WGN-TV signal had become available to approximately 200 additional cable television systems nationwide, reaching approximately 800,000 subscribers. That cable reach would grow over the next several years: the first heaviest concentrations developed in the Central United States (where WGN's telecasts of Chicago Cubs baseball, Chicago Bulls basketball and The Bozo Show became highly popular) and gradually expanded to encompass most of the nation by the mid-1980s. United Video initially charged prospective cable systems 10¢ per subscriber to receive the WGN-TV signal, the same rate Southern Satellite Systems charged for 24-hour-a-day retransmission of WTBS. WGN Continental Broadcasting and station management originally treated WGN-TV as a "passive" superstation, asserting a neutral position over United Video's national retransmission of its signal and holding no oversight over national promotion of the WGN signal. (This was in contrast to WTBS, which handled nationalized promotional responsibilities rather than leaving those duties to its satellite carrier, as WGN had done.) This allowed WGN Continental/Tribune Broadcasting to continue paying for syndicated programming and advertising at local rates rather than those comparable to other national networks. Tribune was also not directly compensated by United Video for their retransmission or promotion of WGN's signal, though under compulsory license provisions applying to out-of-market stations through the Copyright Act of 1976 (further defined through the formation of the Copyright Royalty Tribunal in 1982), WGN-TV did receive royalty payments made by cable and satellite systems retransmitting the national WGN feed to the United States Copyright Office for retransmission of any copyrighted programming over which it held ownership (including news, public affairs, children's and sports programs).

Since United Video did not seek the Tribune Company's permission to relay the WGN-TV signal, for many years, WGN and United Video's relationship was described as being "not particularly friendly," going as far as Tribune even attempting legal challenges to stop retransmission of its signal, even though a Copyright Act exemption clause regarding "passive" carriers in the compulsory license statute of Section 111 effectively defined that satellite carriers were not required to seek direct the express permission of a television station or its licensee (such as WGN-TV/WGN Continental Broadcasting) to redistribute out-of-market broadcast signals. Publicly, Daniel T. Pecaro, president of WGN-TV at the time, opined that the station was "very honored [it was] selected" by United Video and the three other carriers granted redistribution but noted that the station would "continue to serve our Chicagoland communities." For about eleven years afterward, the national WGN-TV signal carried the same programming schedule as that seen in the Chicago area, except in instances where Chicago Bulls basketball games were prohibited from airing on the national feed due to NBA restrictions on superstation broadcasts. The national feed also used the same on-air branding as the Chicago area signal (which was referred to on-air at the time as either "Channel 9" or "WGN Channel 9") until 1997, when it became known as simply "WGN" outside Chicago (although it retained the varied forms of the WGN logo wordmark until 2008); in print and off-air promotional advertisements, however, United Video marketed the service as "WGN, The Chicago SuperChannel" (from 1982 to 1987) and later, on an alternative basis, "WGN/UV" (from 1987 to 1993).

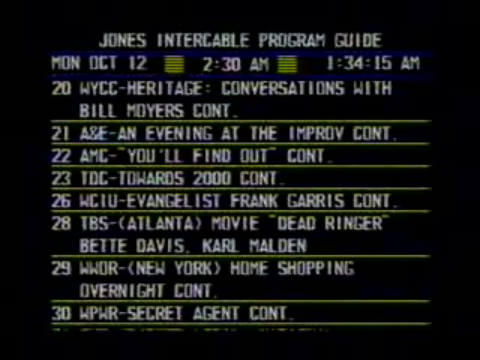
the Electronic Program Guide (EPG) service (EPG Sr. shown)

On February 10, 1981, WGN-TV began using the satellite feed's audio subcarrier signal to transmit programming schedules delivered to the Electronic Program Guide (EPG) service (later Prevue Guide and now the entertainment-based Pop, and operated by United Video's Trakker Inc. unit at the time) in a 2400 bit/s data stream over the satellite feed's vertical blanking interval (VBI) to local cable providers receiving the schedule information to the EPG's proprietary computer units. However, despite being notified that WGN would be conducting tests of the programming information teletext, United Video chose to substitute the material with teletext content from its Dow Jones business news service; its repurposing of the VBI became the subject of a copyright infringement lawsuit filed by Tribune Broadcasting against United Video in the United States District Court for the Northern District of Illinois that April, alleging that it retransmitted the station's prime time newscast, The Nine O'Clock News (now titled WGN News at Nine), as well as other WGN-TV programs in a "mutilated and altered" fashion to use profitable teletext content from the Dow Jones service in a manner which resulted in United Video exercising direct control over the content in violation of Section 111(a) (3) of the 1976 Copyright Act and in interference with an agreement between WGN-TV and Albuquerque, New Mexico, cable provider Albuquerque Cable Television Inc. to supply the EPG teletext to subscribers. United Video contended that the Copyright Act's passive carrier rules applied to how it used the VBI, also maintaining that transmitting extraneous material to cable systems did not constitute a public performance and the teletext material was a separate transmission from the copyrighted program since it required a standalone decoder to view it over television receivers.

On October 8, 1981, District Court Judge Susan Getzendanner denied injunctive relief to WGN Continental Broadcasting and dismissed the case against United Video, citing that it was not required to carry the station's teletext transmission. The U.S. Court of Appeals for the Northern District of Illinois reversed Getzendanner's decision on August 12, 1982, ordering in a narrowly defined ruling that United Video must retransmit WGN-TV's VBI Teletext where the transmission was directly related to and part of the 9:00 p.m. news simulcast. The court pointed out that "purely passive [intermediary]" carriers cannot make any changes or outright remove any part of the copyrighted transmission and that United Video had no grounds to claim exemption from copyright liability as the definition of what the Copyright Act constitutes as a public performance was broad enough to encompass indirect transmission through cable systems that received the WGN satellite feed.

In 1985, Tribune Broadcasting began providing a direct microwave relay link of the WGN-TV signal to United Video to serve as a contingency feed to allow United access to WGN programming in the event of any problems with the microwave link-up. Separate national advertising or per inquiry ads also began to be inserted over the satellite feed in place of local advertisements intended for broadcast in the Chicago market (which, with a few exceptions, became exclusively carried by channel 9 locally). This also allowed the station to increase the amount of advertising revenue it accrued by charging separate rates for the Chicago-area signal and a higher fee for advertisers purchasing airtime on the national signal, and offering advertisers exclusive commercial avails for either the Chicago-based audience or the national cable audience, or uniform avails for both the national and local audiences. Despite the feed restructuring, most of the shows viewable over WGN-TV in the Chicago area continued to air nationally over the satellite signal. In July 1987, United Video began transmitting the WGN superstation feed in stereo; all WGN-TV-produced programming was made available to participating systems in the format, while other programming was initially transmitted in synthesized stereo audio.

On May 18, 1988, the FCC reinstituted the Syndication Exclusivity Rights Rule ("SyndEx"), a rule – previously repealed by the agency in July 1980 – that allows television stations to claim local exclusivity over syndicated programs and requires cable systems to either black out or secure an agreement with the claimant station or a syndication distributor to continue carrying a claimed program through an out-of-market station. To indemnify cable systems from potential blackouts, Tribune and United Video began to secure national retransmission rights to certain programs featured on the WGN Chicago signal—particularly, local and some syndicated programs as well as sporting events not subjected to league restrictions pertaining to the number of games that could be shown on out-of-market stations annually—and substitute programs not subjected to exclusivity claims—mainly syndicated reruns of recent and older comedy and drama series, select first-run syndicated shows, and acquired theatrical feature and made-for-television films not shown on the Chicago feed—to ensure that the national feed would not face blackout issues. United Video also made contingency plans to put alternative programming on a second satellite to which it could switch to absolve any holes in the WGN-TV national feed's schedule by leasing part-time space for the affected time periods.

When the Syndex rules went into effect on January 1, 1990, United Video formally launched a separate national feed of WGN that featured the WGN-TV-transmitted and separately acquired programs cleared for "full-signal" carriage. However, it continued to run much of the same programs as the Chicago broadcast signal with limited programming differentiation from its parent station for most of the 1990s. (This feed was originally structured similarly to the concurrently launched WWOR EMI Service feed of WWOR-TV, albeit with a larger amount of shared programming.) Of the four United Video-distributed superstations, WGN was the only one to have its national coverage expand post-Syndex, adding 2.2 million households with cable or satellite service to its total reach by July 1990; some systems also began to swap out New York City-area rivals WPIX and WWOR in favor of offering the WGN superstation feed in the years immediately following that feed's launch as it offered fewer blackout-subjected programs than other affected superstations. The national feed's distribution gradually expanded further to direct broadcast satellite through agreements with DirecTV, Dish Network and Primestar throughout the 1990s. (A separate feed of WGN-TV was also uplinked in March 1989 by Netlink – a carrier firm operated by cable television provider Tele-Communications, Inc. (TCI), which began distributing WGN as part of a satellite program package to C-band dishes in October 1987 – for distribution to home satellite dish owners.) In January 1992, WGN-TV signed an agreement with A.C. Nielsen Co. to provide monthly measurements of the station's national audience (separate from its ratings tallies for its Chicago viewership) through Nielsen's cable network measurement service.

==== Affiliation with The WB; transfer from United Video to Tribune ====
Former logo as WGN Superstation, used from 2001 to 2002.

Former logo as Superstation WGN, used from 2002 to 2008.

On November 2, 1993, Time Warner announced the formation of The WB Television Network, a venture developed in partnership with the Tribune Company (which, prior to acquiring an 11% interest in August 1995, was a non-equity partner in the new network) and former Fox network executive Jamie Kellner (who would serve as the original president of and would hold a minority ownership stake in The WB). Tribune committed six of the seven independent stations it owned at the time to become the network's charter affiliates; however, it initially exempted the WGN-TV Chicago signal from the agreement, as station management had expressed concerns about how the network's plans to expand its prime time and daytime programming would affect WGN's sports broadcast rights and the impact that the potential of having to phase them out to fulfill network commitments would have on the superstation feed's appeal to cable and satellite providers elsewhere around the United States. Tribune would reverse course on December 3, 1993, reaching a separate agreement with Time Warner to allow WGN-TV to become The WB's charter affiliate for the Chicago market and allow the WGN superstation feed to serve as a de facto national network feed intended for American media markets that did not initially have a local affiliate; this would bide The WB enough time to fill remaining gaps in affiliate coverage in "white area" regions that lacked a standalone independent station following its launch. In exchange, Time Warner agreed to reduce the network's initial program offerings to one night per week (from two) to limit conflicts with WGN's sports broadcasts. The superstation feed, which reached 37% of the country by that time, would extend the network's initial coverage to 73% of all U.S. households that had at least one television set.

The WGN-TV local and superstation feeds became WB charter affiliates when the network launched on January 11, 1995. (In the case of the Chicago signal, this marked the first time that WGN-TV was affiliated with a major broadcast network since DuMont ceased operations in August 1956.) The WGN cable agreement resulted in The WB becoming the second American broadcast television network to use a cable-originated service to provide extended coverage in designated "white areas" without over-the-air affiliate clearances, and one of three network-to-cable undertakings stewarded by Jamie Kellner. As The WB was under development, Kellner was in process of developing The WeB, a proposed national WB cable feed for smaller markets based upon a service that he launched as President of the Fox Broadcasting Company, Foxnet, which operated from June 1991 until September 2006. The use of WGN as a national relay feed gave The WB an early advantage over the United Paramount Network (UPN) – another fledgling network that made its national debut on January 16, 1995, as a joint venture between Chris-Craft/United Television and Paramount Television – which declined to allow the WWOR EMI Service to act as its national carrier despite UPN having similar gaps in its broadcast affiliate coverage initially. The WGN superstation feed accounted for roughly 18% of the national coverage that The WB had at launch, with the rest of the network's initial 62% total reach coming from the 60 broadcast affiliates (including WGN-TV) that were willing to adhere to its reverse compensation plan for prospective affiliates. In some areas where cable systems did not carry the superstation feed and maintenance of a local WB affiliate was not yet possible, satellite distribution was the only way viewers could see the network's programming over WGN. (The WGN national feed served as the default WB affiliate for residents in 152 markets and the entirety of 21 U.S. states—Alaska, Arkansas, Delaware, Idaho, Iowa, Kansas, Maine, Mississippi, Montana, New Hampshire, New Mexico, North Dakota, Oklahoma, South Carolina, South Dakota, Tennessee, Vermont, Washington, West Virginia, Wisconsin and Wyoming—at varying periods of time up through the launch of The WeB.) United Video intended to provide an alternate feed of WGN with substitute programming for markets that had a WB-affiliated station; however, no such measure was taken, creating network duplication in markets where over-the-air WB affiliates were forced to compete with the WGN cable feed.

The WGN superstation feed carried The WB's prime time lineup from the latter's launch, and added the companion Kids' WB children's programming block when it debuted on September 11, 1995. Conversely, in the Chicago market, WGN-TV chose only to air the network's prime time lineup, and exercised a right of first refusal to decline Kids' WB to offer a local morning newscast and an afternoon block of syndicated sitcoms aimed at a family audience on weekdays and a mix of locally produced news, public affairs and children's programs as well as paid programs on weekend mornings; this cleared the way for Weigel Broadcasting to cut a separate deal to air Kids' WB programs locally over group flagship WCIU-TV (channel 26), an independent station that ran the block Monday through Saturdays from September 1995 until WGN-TV began clearing the entire Kids' WB lineup on its schedule in September 2004. As The WB's initial program offerings ran on Wednesdays for its first nine months of operation and its prime time schedule would not expand to six nights a week until September 1999, the superstation feed filled the 8:00 to 10:00 pm. Eastern Time slot on nights without WB network programming with either sports telecasts from WGN-TV that were cleared for national broadcast – which, as The WB expanded its programming to other nights over a four-year period beginning with the September 1995 launch of its Sunday lineup, would result in pre-emptions of the network's programs until later in the week – or, as with most over-the-air WB affiliates during the network's early years, theatrical feature films acquired via the syndication market.

By 1995, the WGN superstation feed was available to about 85% of all American cable systems, reaching approximately 35 million households; however, some distribution gaps remained well into the 2000s in parts of the Northeastern and Western United States (including in select major markets like Pittsburgh and the immediate New York City area). In May 1995, United Video shifted retransmission responsibilities for the WGN, WPIX and KTLA superstation feeds to its newly incorporated UVTV subsidiary. In 1997, Tele-Communications Inc. and Tribune discussed a proposal to sell a 50% ownership stake in the WGN superstation feed to TCI – which, in January 1996, acquired a controlling interest in United Video, eventually expanding its share in the company to an approximate 73% equity and 93% stock and voting interest by January 1998 – and convert it into a basic cable channel (similar to what WTBS had done that same year and similar to Tribune's conversion of WGN America into a basic service that began in 2014). The proposal would have also seen TCI provide additional programming (including library content from distributors through which parent company Liberty Media had held investments) and receive subscriber fees paid by participating cable systems. This proposal ultimately did not yield a deal, with Tribune and United Video maintaining stewardship of the national channel.

Into the late 1990s, The WB began to expand its local broadcast coverage in American media markets that had previously relied on the WGN national feed to receive the network's programming; it signed affiliation agreements with local broadcast stations (including UPN charter affiliates, leftover independents, former noncommercial stations adopting an entertainment format, and dual affiliations with stations already affiliated with other networks [such as UPN]) within the top-100 media markets after its launch, while coverage in the 110 smallest markets was achieved through the September 1998 launch of The WeB (subsequently renamed The WB 100+ Station Group), a packaged feed of WB network and syndicated programs provided to participating cable-based affiliates. With local availability becoming less of an issue and with exclusivity protections being granted by the network to its affiliates in specific markets by this time, on January 27, 1999, Time Warner and Tribune mutually agreed to cease the stopgap WB programming relay over the WGN superstation feed effective that fall. On October 6, when the WGN superstation feed formally stopped carrying WB network programming, Kids' WB programming on weekday mornings and afternoons and on Sunday mornings was replaced with syndicated series, while feature films replaced The WB's prime time programs, resulting in the superstation's schedule more so resembling an independent station than a general entertainment cable network due to the presence of local programming from WGN-TV. The removal of WB programs from the superstation feed reduced The WB's potential audience by 10 million households, and was cited as the reason behind an estimated 19% decline in the network's season-to-season household audience for the 1999–2000 season, which saw The WB consequently fall to sixth place (behind UPN) in the Nielsen ratings. For similar reasons to those that necessitated the channel's decision to remove WB programming, WGN America also did not carry any programming from The CW when WGN-TV became its Chicago charter affiliate upon that network's September 2006 launch, as that network is widely available throughout the United States via over-the-air broadcast stations and affiliations with digital subchannels and local cable outlets (including through The CW Plus in smaller markets) when that network launched in September 2006.

Between 1998 and 2005, the amount of common programming shown on both the Chicago signal and national superstation feeds steadily decreased, an issue that continued well after the WGN America rebrand. Comparatively, approximately 50% of the programs seen on WGN consisted of those originating on the Chicago feed that were cleared for "full-signal" carriage by the national feed; this proportion of common programming dropped to around 30% by 2005 through the prior removal of WB programming and the overall schedule beginning to rely more on programs acquired specifically for national carriage as syndicators increasingly insisted on exclusivity protection for their series and film packages and were unwilling to license the rights to higher-profile syndicated programs to the superstation feed, believing that it would be more lucrative to license those programs to individual stations.

On July 12, 2000, Gemstar International Group Limited acquired TV Guide, Inc. (which United Video Satellite Group renamed itself following its 1999 purchase of TV Guide magazine from News Corporation), subsequently changing its name to Gemstar–TV Guide International. In April 2001, Tribune Broadcasting purchased a majority interest in UVTV – one of three satellite carrier units, along with Superstar/Netlink Group and Netlink USA, that were operated by the company – from TV Guide, Inc. unit of Gemstar–TV Guide (which was refocusing its assets around TV Guide magazine, the TV Guide Interactive interactive program guide platform and the TV Guide Channel) for $106 million in cash, shifting responsibility for retransmission, distribution and promotion of the WGN superstation feed to Tribune and effectively transitioning WGN from a "passive" to an "active" superstation, as TBS had been since it was first uplinked in December 1976. (The transaction would be the subject of a 2004 Securities and Exchange Commission securities fraud investigation against co-president Peter Boylan that determined that Gemstar failed to inform investors that Tribune committed to a six-year, $100 million advertising contract with Gemstar in exchange for selling its stake in WGN to Tribune.)

On September 10, 2001, the channel's name was changed to WGN Superstation, in an effort by Tribune Broadcasting to emphasize the channel's national programming prominence; the WGN-TV Chicago signal, meanwhile, continued to use the callsign-only "WGN" branding with the "Channel 9" identification remaining as a sub-brand. On November 11, 2002, the superstation feed underwent another name change, becoming known as Superstation WGN to reflect the strong national standing of the channel; this change coincided with the introduction of the Akzidenz Grotesk "arrow G" logo introduced by WGN-TV at that time (and used until May 15, 2017), which was stylized for the superstation feed's logo design to also incorporate an oval with a die-cut "S" emblem to represent its superstation status.

On April 1, 2007, Chicago-based real estate investor Sam Zell announced plans to purchase the Tribune Company in a leveraged buyout worth $8.2 billion, under which Tribune employees were awarded stock and given effective ownership of the company. The transaction and concurring privatization of Tribune was completed upon termination of the company's stock at the close of trading on the New York Stock Exchange (NYSE) on December 20, 2007, at which time Zell formally became the company's chairman and chief executive officer (CEO).

=== Rebranding as WGN America ===
Original logo as WGN America, used from May 2008 to January 2009; the text became the sole logo from January to April 2009

Logo used from April 2009 to June 30, 2010

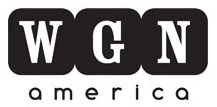
Logo used from July 1, 2010 to January 19, 2014

The "Superstation" identifier was removed from the cable channel's on-air branding and promotions on May 24, 2008, when it adopted the name WGN America. The new name as well as its accompanying slogan ("TV You Can't Ignore") and logo (an illustration of a woman's eyes, designed similarly to the "eye-and-profile" logo scheme used by premium service The Movie Channel from May 1988 until June 1997) went into full-time use on May 26, 2008. On-air promotions began identifying the channel as WGN America on a limited basis since the beginning of May 2008, although channel IDs using the "Superstation WGN" moniker remained in place during the transitional period. (The logo adopted as part of the branding overhaul marked the first time that the superstation feed used an on-air logo that did not incorporate the visual branding used by WGN-TV in some capacity, although promotional advertising logos for the national channel used prior to 1993 differed from that of the Chicago signal.)

The channel began to slowly revamp its programming lineup, acquiring additional recent and older television series and adding marathon-style blocks of acquired series on weekend mornings. A few shows were also dropped from the WGN America schedule (such as longtime staples U.S. Farm Report and Soul Train), primarily due to the Tribune Company dissolving its television production and distribution unit, Tribune Entertainment. The network's on-screen logo bug was revised in late July 2008, to feature the eye-and-profile element of the logo morphing into the "WGN America" text; the eye-and-profile element remained part of the general logo in all other uses until January 2009, when it was deemphasized in favor of using the channel's wordmark text as the primary logo. In June 2008, Zell and Tribune co-chief executive officer at the time, Randy Michaels, disclosed to the media during a nationwide tour promoting the Tribune properties that the company was interested in producing a late night talk show hosted by comedian Jay Leno, following the end of his initial run as host of NBC's The Tonight Show that year, intending to use the Tribune television stations as a major distribution arm and WGN America as a national broadcaster of the show. However, in December 2008, NBC reached a deal with Leno for him to host a new prime time talk show to fill the 10:00 p.m. Eastern Time slot on Monday through Friday evenings. (Low national viewership and concerns about its effects on late local newscasts prompted NBC to cancel The Jay Leno Show in February 2010, leading to the network's controversial decision to reinstate Leno as host of The Tonight Show one month later, after initial plans to move him to a separate Tonight lead-in led to the resignation of his replacement on that program, Conan O'Brien, and O'Brien's subsequent launch of a new late-night talk show on TBS.)

On December 8, 2008, the Tribune Company filed for Chapter 11 bankruptcy protection, citing a debt load of around $13 billion – making it the largest media bankruptcy in American corporate history – that it accrued from the Zell buyout and related privatization costs as well as a sharp downturn in revenue from newspaper advertising. In April 2009, WGN America underwent another rebrand, with a new retro-style logo (which was updated on July 1, 2010, to a more minimalistic graphic style), a new five-note sounder (based on the sound ID used by WGN Radio in Chicago), new graphics, a new slogan ("Everywhere America Calls Home"), and the introduction of some original programming to its schedule. The changes were made to increase its cable distribution outside the channel's traditional coverage area and position itself as a general entertainment network that programs to the entire nation, not just Chicago and the Midwest.

==== Separation from WGN-TV and conversion to standalone channel ====
With the Tribune Company undergoing ownership and management changes following its exit from protracted Chapter 11 bankruptcy reorganization proceedings on December 31, 2012, under the control of senior debt holders Oaktree Capital Management, JPMorgan Chase and Angelo, Gordon & Co. (a reorganization which also led to the eventual spin-off of the company's publishing division in August 2014 to focus on its broadcasting, digital media and real estate units), Tribune announced plans to convert WGN America from a superstation into a conventional cable-originated entertainment channel, similar to TBS's transition to a traditional cable channel—albeit in a hybrid form as it continued to relay its programming over its Atlanta parent station for nine years afterward—in January 1998. Ironically, it was the national TBS channel's separation from its parent Atlanta station WTBS (which was concurrently re-called WPCH-TV as part of the restructuring of the two services) on October 1, 2007, that resulted in WGN America becoming the last remaining American superstation to be distributed nationally through cable television systems as well as satellite and other types of multichannel subscription television providers.

Plans called for WGN America to incorporate scripted original programming, to migrate from "limited basic" (or "lifeline") programming tiers (where it is carried alongside local and, in some areas, non-superstation-structured out-of-market broadcast television stations and public access channels) to the "expanded basic" tiers of cable and other wired multichannel television providers, and forego its longstanding royalty payment structure to adopt a retransmission consent model in future carriage agreements in which Tribune would receive subscriber-based fees from its multichannel television distributors for carriage of the network. Matt Cherniss was appointed as the first president and general manager of WGN America and Tribune Studios, a new production unit that was formed with the intent of producing some of the network's original content, on March 19, 2013.

Salem and WGN America saw a major promotional push that commenced with Fox's broadcast of Super Bowl XLVIII on February 2, which saw part of their local advertising time on Tribune Broadcasting's fifteen Fox-affiliated stations (including those located in Seattle and Denver, the two cities whose local NFL franchises – the Seahawks and the Broncos, respectively – played in the game) being used to run an extended promotional ad for Salem, followed by further promotion on other Tribune-owned/operated local television stations in the lead-up to the show's April 20 premiere. In a May 2014 symposium at the MoffattNathanson Media & Communications Summit, Tribune President and CEO Peter Liguori – a former Fox and Discovery Communications executive who joined the Tribune Company in December 2012 – stated that with its new programming strategy, about 50% of participating American multichannel television providers would begin offering WGN America as a conventional cable-originated channel by the end of 2014, with all providers offering it on a higher-end basic programming tier by around 2016.

WGN America's conversion into a conventional cable-originated channel became formal on December 13, 2014, when simulcasts of WGN-TV's Chicago-originated local newscasts, news specials and public affairs programs, special events and sports telecasts (although a simulcast of the first hour of the station's then five-hour-long morning newscast was carried early weekday mornings during the transitional period) immediately ceased being shown on a national basis. On December 15, Tribune reached a carriage agreement with Comcast Xfinity that saw WGN America move from limited to expanded basic tiers effective the following day (December 16) on its systems in Boston, Philadelphia, Washington, D.C., Seattle and Chicago. Despite the reduction in common programming between WGN-TV and WGN America towards the end of their joint existence as a national superstation, the channel's addition to Comcast's Chicago systems marked the first time that WGN America had been available on cable television – instead of just on direct-broadcast and C-band satellite, as had been the case for about two decades – in the home market of its former parent station. The three Tribune-owned superstations that remained, WPIX, KTLA and KWGN-TV, were confined in their remaining U.S. distribution to wired subscription television services to their respective regions of the United States (the Pacific and Desert Southwest for KTLA, the Intermountain West for KWGN and the Northeast for WPIX), but remained available nationally through Dish Network, albeit restricted to existing subscribers who purchased its a la carte superstation tier before Dish halted the tier's sale to new subscribers in September 2013. (WGN-TV would regain national availability in the spring of 2015, when Channel Master included the Chicago feed among the initial offerings of its LinearTV over-the-top streaming service.)

On June 12, 2016, at 7:00 pm. Eastern Time, Dish Network removed Tribune Broadcasting's 43 television stations and WGN America from its lineup, after the two companies were unable to reconcile terms on renewing their existing carriage contract. WGN America's channel slot was replaced by a duplicate feed of TNT during the blackout. (The company's broadcast television stations, such as WGN-TV, were replaced with a repeating recorded video message prepared by Dish Network notifying viewers of their removal.) After having its television properties off the satellite provider for 1½ months, Tribune and Dish Network reached a deal to return the Tribune Broadcasting stations and WGN America to the Dish lineup on September 3, commencing hours after the announcement.

==== Nexstar Media Group ownership ====
On May 8, 2017, Hunt Valley, Maryland-based Sinclair Broadcast Group announced that it would acquire Tribune Media for $3.9 billion in cash and stock, plus the assumption of $2.7 billion in Tribune-held debt. Following the announcement of the purchase, Sinclair CEO Christopher Ripley disclosed plans to reposition WGN America around acquired series and "cost-effective" original programs in an effort to orient the network for "profitable growth," de-emphasizing high-end scripted series from WGN America's programming slate. The deal drove speculation that Sinclair would use WGN America's wide national reach to launch a conservative-leaning cable news rival to Fox News Channel and Newsmax TV over WGN's existing transponder and channel space. (Such speculation had been floated for over a year, dating to its January 2016 purchase of Tennis Channel, driven mainly because, since the implementation of the now-defunct local/national News Central hybrid format in 2003, Sinclair has produced national must-run segments for its stations that have been cited as having a noticeable conservative slant, a major concern levied by Democratic members of Congress, anti-consolidation media activist groups and even some conservatives who were opposed to the deal.) However, Variety reporter Cynthia Littleton noted that such a revamp may not be fiscally viable, as it would risk piling on additional debt on top of that which Sinclair had already accrued through the spate of station purchases it has made since the 2011 acquisition of Four Points Media Group (estimated at $3.268 billion as of March 31, 2017), and the debt it would have assumed through the Tribune deal. Former professional wrestling executive Eric Bischoff spoke in favor of the Sinclair-Tribune deal during a Q&A session on his official Periscope account on March 14, 2018, noting that Sinclair could use WGN America to expand the reach of Sinclair-owned professional wrestling promotion Ring of Honor in a similar manner that the Turner Broadcasting System used World Championship Wrestling (WCW) and its predecessors including Jim Crockett Promotions and Georgia Championship Wrestling from the 1970s until the early 2000s via TBS and TNT. Had that been the case, Ring of Honor Wrestling would have been third weekly series to be carried by the network, after WWE Superstars and Ring Warriors.

On August 9, Tribune announced it would terminate the Sinclair deal; concurrently, Tribune filed a breach of contract lawsuit in the Delaware Chancery Court, alleging that Sinclair engaged in protracted negotiations with the FCC and the DOJ over regulatory issues, refused to sell stations in markets where it already had properties, and proposed divestitures to parties with ties to Sinclair executive chair David D. Smith that were rejected or highly subject to rejection to maintain control over stations it was required to sell.

On December 3, 2018, Irving, Texas-based Nexstar Media Group announced it would acquire Tribune's assets including WGN America for $6.4 billion in cash and debt. Nexstar traditionally has structured itself as a local-specific media company, and has spun off most of the more national or extraneous assets of companies that it has acquired in the recent past. Following the Tribune purchase announcement, representatives for Nexstar stated that the company would consider the sale of certain "non-core" assets tied to the sale during or after the acquisition process, though it instead decided to wind those non-core operations down, including Zap2It and TV by the Numbers. There was a possibility that WGN America and WGN Radio (which would ultimately become the first radio property ever to be owned by the group) would have been sold off, though Nexstar eventually decided to retain and strengthen both properties. The purchase was finalized between the two groups on September 19, 2019. Upon completion of the purchase, Nexstar expanded the responsibilities of WGN America president/general manager Matt Cherniss to include oversight of WGN Radio and Antenna TV.

=== Relaunch as NewsNation; conversion into news channel ===
On September 1, 2020, WGN America launched a three-hour-long prime time newscast, NewsNation. Development of the program began in October 2019, when Nexstar management commissioned research from television subscribers that would determine that a share of survey participants were dissatisfied with opinion-based programming on cable news channels such as CNN (which had previously offered straight news programming within its evening lineup, before shifting into a personality-based programming in the mid-2010s), MSNBC (which gravitated toward liberal opinion/talk programs beginning in 2008), and Fox News (developed in 1996 with a conservative-leaning format). The program draws partly from the broadcast and digital resources of Nexstar's television stations (including those acquired by Tribune Media, in addition to WGN America, several months prior).

During December 2020 and January 2021, Nexstar reached carriage agreements that added WGN America to virtual multichannel television providers YouTube TV (reached on December 1), FuboTV (reached on December 11), Hulu (reached on December 18), Sling TV (reached on December 24, through a broader agreement with Sling parent Dish Network which ended a three-week impasse in which the satellite provider lost access to Nexstar's broadcast stations) and Vidgo (reached on January 14) to expand the channel beyond its existing wireline and satellite distribution footprint, and increase exposure for NewsNation. (AT&T TV had already carried the channel since October 2019).

On January 25, 2021, Nexstar Media Group announced it would relaunch WGN America under the NewsNation brand on March 1. The name change coincided with an initial expansion of its news programming to eight hours per day (from six): the revised news schedule was fronted by a splintered expansion of the flagship NewsNation broadcast (adding an hour-long early evening edition, alongside the existing and reduced prime time broadcast, to be reduced to two hours from three) and two host-centered news and interview programs anchored respectively by Joe Donlon (who had been co-anchoring the prime time NewsNation since its premiere and remained with the relau network until 2022) and Ashleigh Banfield; former CNN host Chris Cuomo would later join NewsNation as a prime-time host in July 2022. NewsNation continued to maintain a reduced schedule of entertainment programs acquired by the channel under the WGN America moniker in daytime and select overnight slots; beginning with the launch of the morning news program Morning in America in September 2021, additional news content has gradually been added to the lineup to replace the acquired entertainment shows as the channel's syndication contracts inherited by Nexstar through the Tribune purchase expired.

NewsNation switched to all-news programming on weekdays on April 24, 2023, and in the run-up to that year's presidential and legislative elections, formally converted its weekend schedule to a rolling news format on June 1, 2024, completing its transition to a 24/7 news network as contracts for the remaining syndicated programs acquired under the WGN America brand that were on its schedule expired. (Immediately prior to the conversion to 24/7 news, Blue Bloods was the sole remaining entertainment program airing on NewsNation.) WGN-TV's locally produced programming continues to be available through the station's website as a 24-hour livestream, accompanied by rebroadcasts of its newscasts and non-news local shows outside of live programming hours and the ability to watch on traditional televisions through digital media player apps on Apple TV, Fire TV and Roku platforms. Nexstar exempted WGN-TV—along with KTLA and KRON-TV/San Francisco—from a 2023 corporate mandate requiring most of the group's stations to begin streaming all local programming on a two-hour delay from their initial live broadcast, in an attempt to maintain leverage with pay television providers in carriage negotiations, an initiative abandoned two years later due to internal station personnel and viewer pressure.

== Programming ==
For much of its post-Syndex existence as the superstation feed of WGN-TV, many of these programs were cleared by television syndication distributors for "full-signal" rights, therefore allowing them to air on WGN America as they do not fall under syndication exclusivity regulations (for example, although How I Met Your Mother is syndicated to other television stations nationwide, including WGN-TV, it is allowed to air on WGN America due to its clearance by 20th Television for "full-signal" carriage). However, in 2013, WGN America began to acquire exclusive cable rights to programs eligible for syndication (such as Person of Interest and Parks and Recreation) as part of the channel's shift towards operating as a conventional cable network.

Movies formed much of the superstation's prime time schedule for much of its existence until the "Superstation WGN" branding era, though there have been exceptions: fewer prime time movies aired during the week during its four-year run as a cable-only affiliate of The WB from January 1995 to October 1999, particularly as that network's programming expanded to additional nights, with films airing on a nightly basis again – except on certain nights throughout the year to accommodate WGN-TV-produced sports telecasts cleared for national retransmission – once WB programming was dropped. Films were later removed from Sunday nights with the launch of the "Outta Sight Retro Night" block in August 2007, and from Thursday nights between 2009 and 2010 to accommodate original programs such as WWE Superstars. WGN America then relegated its movie telecasts to Sunday afternoons and weekend late nights from September 18, 2010, until prime time films returned on Tuesdays, Thursdays and Saturdays in May 2013.

Until 2012, the channel's morning and early afternoon schedule heavily relied on reruns of television series produced between the 1960s and the early 1990s. These programs were also prominently featured as part of the classic sitcom block "Outta Sight Retro Night," which aired Sunday nights (incorporating a one-hour breakaway within the block's designated nine-hour-long time period for the 10:00 pm. Eastern Time simulcasts of WGN News at Nine and Instant Replay) from August 26, 2007, until September 5, 2010. Some of the programs shown as part of the block – which included series such as WKRP in Cincinnati, Newhart, ALF, Barney Miller and The Honeymooners – had previously aired on WGN prior to the re-implementation of Syndex, or even after the rules went into effect on the Chicago signal or/and the superstation feed. (Tribune Broadcasting later included some of these shows on Antenna TV, a broadcast network focusing on classic television series that Tribune launched on January 1, 2011.

During the early 2000s, WGN America acquired sub-run syndication rights to series that had previously aired in their original broadcast runs during the channel's affiliation with The WB, including 7th Heaven, The Wayans Bros., Sister, Sister and The Parent 'Hood. Between 2006 and 2009, WGN America ran teen- and preteen-oriented sitcoms during mid-afternoon timeslots such as Lizzie McGuire, Even Stevens and Sister, Sister, only for these shows to quickly be moved to overnight graveyard slots (when the show's target audiences are usually not awake) and then removed from the channel entirely shortly afterward. This was likely due to the restructuring of Tribune's television division and a distribution agreement with the Disney Channel that proved too expensive to maintain.

=== Original and licensed programming ===
On August 21, 2008, WGN America announced a partnership with Indianapolis radio station WFBQ to broadcast a televised version of The Bob & Tom Show radio program, originally produced for the Tribune-owned Indianapolis duopoly of Fox affiliate WXIN (channel 59) and CW affiliate WTTV (channel 4, now a CBS affiliate). The program debuted on WGN America on November 3, 2008, originally airing in a standard late night slot, before being shifted to an overnight graveyard slot until the Bob & Tom television broadcast ended on September 13, 2010. On December 19, 2008, Tribune reached a deal with World Wrestling Entertainment to broadcast WWE Superstars as an hour-long weekly program on WGN America. The program started airing on WGN America on April 16, 2009, airing on the channel for two years until Superstars was dropped from its lineup after the April 7, 2011, telecast.

In April 2010, WGN America announced it would begin carrying Earl Pitts Uhmerikun, a television version of the radio commentary series created by Gary Burbank. Burbank – whose segments as the "middle American" archetype character began airing on the channel that same month – had long maintained a close relationship with certain executives working at that time for the Tribune Company, who approached him about bringing the segments to television. The commentary was aired in the form of a series of 90-second segments that aired on WGN America until November 2011, usually during simulcasts of WGN-TV newscasts.

As part of WGN America's restructuring, the channel began to develop original programming – some of which will be produced through Tribune Studios, a production and distribution unit formed in March 2013 to develop syndicated programs that would be seen primarily on Tribune Broadcasting's television properties. On June 4, 2013, WGN America placed a 13-episode order for its first original scripted program, the drama series Salem (which is based around the Salem witch trials), which premiered on April 20, 2014. The network debuted its first unscripted series, Wrestling with Death, on January 13, 2015.

Tribune began shifting WGN America's development slate away from scripted content under the stewardship of interim Tribune President/CEO Peter Kern, shortly after he replaced Peter Liguori as head of the company in March 2017, beginning with the cancellation of the drama series Outsiders. When Sinclair Broadcast Group announced its proposed purchase of Tribune Media, Sinclair CEO Christopher Ripley's plans for the channel to focus on "cost-effective" original programs were cited as being based on the assertion that the network's then-current original programming budget was unjustified based on the channel's ratings (while not among the top 25 highest-rated cable networks, WGN America's viewership had gradually increased since the introduction of original scripted series, posting its highest monthly ratings in March 2017, during which it total viewership averaged 446,000 viewers and viewership among adults ages 25 to 54 totaled at 157,000). Ripley's statement immediately put into question the future of the slavery-era period drama Underground, which premiered on the network in March 2016 and ended its second season two days after the announcement of Tribune acquisition on May 10, 2017. Reports stated that Underground's production company/distributor Sony Pictures Television would seek other network and streaming partners to continue the program; WGN announced its decision to cancel the series on May 30.

After the network reduced its original programming budget, WGN America focused its first-run programming efforts on scripted programs of reasonably lower production cost, including programs originally developed for international syndication, some of which would form the basis of the "Prime Crime" programming block. The first of these licensing agreements was announced on July 31, 2017, when WGN America acquired the U.S. television rights to the Anna Paquin-led Canadian drama Bellevue. This was followed on August 8, when it acquired the U.S. rights to the Canadian crime dramas Pure and Shoot the Messenger and the German-Swedish co-production 100 Code, with proposed American premieres set for the first half of 2018. Bellevue was the first of these licensed series to make their U.S. debut on WGN America, premiering on the channel on January 23, 2018. Pure would not make its U.S. debut on WGN America until January 23, 2019. The network returned to unscripted reality programming with the July 2019 premiere of Dog's Most Wanted, featuring Duane "Dog" Chapman, his wife Beth, and their team of bounty hunters dubbed "The Dirty Dozen", pursuing some of America's most wanted fugitives. In September 2018, WGN America began airing a revival of Ring Warriors, marking the first time professional wrestling aired on the network since their last broadcast of WWE Superstars on April 7, 2011.

==== Evening news programming ====
On January 15, 2020, WGN America announced it would launch a three-hour-long, nightly prime time newscast titled NewsNation, which premiered on September 1, 2020. The program, which is produced from the WGN-TV facility in Chicago, offers non-partisan coverage that is based upon the traditional, straight news style of local television newscasts; it primarily uses the journalistic resources of Nexstar Media Group's 110 television news operations, augmenting an in-house staff of anchors, correspondents and meteorologists (almost all of whom exclusively have backgrounds in local television news).

The neutral broadcast was designed to compete with mainly opinion-based news programs shown on CNN, MSNBC, and Fox News Channel during the 8:00 to 11:00 pm. Eastern Time slot and rebroadcasts shown in the three succeeding hours, replacing acquired entertainment programming and movies that occupied prime time and early late-night timeslots. NewsNation was the first national news effort to use WGN America as a platform since it carried the similarly formatted 1980–90 syndicated program Independent Network News under former parent Tribune's ownership (as the superstation feed of WGN-TV). Since the network was relaunched under the NewsNation brand in February 2021, straight news programs have gradually migrated to the daytime hours as it replaced syndicated entertainment shows to expand its news format to the rest of the schedule; early evening and prime time hours on the network have concurrently shifted towards talk and analysis programs (mirroring the scheduling format of competing cable news channels).

=== WGN-TV programming ===
From the time United Video uplinked the Chicago station's signal to satellite in November 1978 until the national channel became a conventional cable network in December 2014, WGN America carried various programs produced by WGN-TV's news and public affairs, sports and local programming departments for national broadcast.

==== Newscasts ====
When national distribution of the WGN-TV signal commenced, the national feed carried the station's two traditional long-form newscasts, Newsnine (anchored at the time of uplink by Jack Taylor, who, the following year, was shifted to the broadcast's weekend editions and replaced as lead weeknight anchor by John Drury) and Nightbeat (a half-hour, overnight news program that WGN-TV aired as a lead-out of its late night movie presentations until its cancellation in 1983); the local morning agricultural news program Top 'o' the Morning (then co-hosted by U.S. Farm Report anchor Orion Samuelson and Harold Turner); the local public affairs programs People to People (a bi-weekly public affairs program that debuted in 1973, and was then hosted by local civil rights leader Edwin C. "Bill" Berry), Issues Unlimited (a Sunday morning public affairs program moderated by Chicago Bulletin editor and columnist Hurley Green Sr. that ran from 1971 to 1987) and Charlando (a Spanish-language talk show focusing on Chicago's Hispanic and Latino community that premiered in 1964 and aired until 1999, with Peter Nuno hosting the program throughout its 35-year run); daily midday and prime time news updates; and morning sign-on news capsules. (Charlando's replacement, the bi-weekly Adelante, Chicago, was added to the national feed in January 2000.)

On October 5, 1980, the 10:00 p.m. (Central) Newsnine broadcast evolved into an hour-long newscast, originally titled The Nine O'Clock News (later retitled WGN News at Nine in May 1993). Upon its premiere in September 1983, the national feed added a simulcast of WGN-TV's midday newscast, then known as Midday Newscope and originally structured as a half-hour local version of the Gannett Broadcasting–Telepictures-produced Newscope syndicated format. (The program was later renamed Chicago's Midday News in September 1984, WGN News at Noon in May 1993 and finally to WGN Midday News upon its expansion outside its longtime 12:00 pm. Central slot into the preceding hour in October 2008.) Various morning news efforts by WGN-TV were also shown on the national feed, including a traditional half-hour morning newscast, Chicago's First Report (which aired from May to December 1984), its original weekend morning news venture (which debuted in August 1992, with a Saturday edition that ran until its cancellation in December 1998 and a Sunday edition that ran until its cancellation and displacement by The Bozo Super Sunday Show in September 1994), and the weekday WGN Morning News (which aired nationally beginning at its debut on September 7, 1994). The WGN Morning News became the first WGN-TV newscast to be denied clearance on or removed from the national feed, with its removal from the lineup following the September 13, 1996, broadcast reportedly being due to self-imposed exclusivity restrictions concerning the newscast's paid segments and rate charges that the station's sales department – which negotiates the appearance and the terms for those segments – would have to pay if the segments aired nationally. The discontinuance of the morning news simulcast also accommodated the then-newly launched Kids' WB weekday morning block, which the national feed originally intended to air alongside the block's existing weekday afternoon hour.

The national feed also served as one of two cable distributors – along with The Learning Channel, which aired the program for the final four years of its run – for the Independent Network News (INN) (later retitled INN: The Independent News in September 1984 and USA Tonight in January 1987), a Tribune-syndicated national news effort originating from then-New York sister station WPIX that premiered on June 9, 1980, as a weeknightly prime time broadcast. (INN would expand to include weekend editions beginning on October 4, 1980, followed by the launch of a Midday Edition, which ran from October 5, 1981, until September 6, 1985.) Tribune Broadcasting discontinued production of the program – by then known as USA Tonight and aired as both part of WGN-TV's hybrid local-national 9:00 p.m. news format of the period and as a standalone overnight rebroadcast – after the June 4, 1990, edition, as a byproduct of a collaborative agreement between Tribune and the Turner Broadcasting System in which the Tribune stations were granted access to CNN Newsource content and began feeding video footage to the CNN video wire service.

From the implementation of the SyndEx rules in January 1990 until September 2014, the simulcasts of WGN-TV's midday and nightly 9:00 p.m. newscasts were occasionally preempted on the WGN national feed if either clearance issues that prevented a game telecast (usually a Bulls game shown exclusively on the Chicago signal) that was scheduled to start at or run past 9:00 pm. Central Time shown locally from being aired over the national feed, a WGN-TV Cubs or White Sox game telecast started on WGN America at 1:00 pm. Eastern Time or – with the exception of a period from September 13, 2010 until May 2013, when it filled the prime time lineup with sitcom reruns – movies shown only over the national channel were scheduled to run past the 9:00 pm. Central slot.

Although WGN-TV began to adopt a news-intensive schedule in September 2008 as part of a broader local news expansion among Tribune Broadcasting's Fox and news-producing CW stations, WGN America never cleared any of the newscasts – specifically, the concurring expansion of the midday newscast to 11:30 a.m. (Central) and launch of a half-hour early-evening newscast on September 15, 2008 (the former of which would eventually be expanded to 11:00 [Central] locally on October 5, 2009, while the latter was gradually expanded into what would become a two-hour-long broadcast by September 8, 2014, and accompanied by weekend editions that premiered on July 12 of that year) and the second incarnation of its weekend morning newscast (added locally as an hour-long broadcast on October 2, 2010) – that WGN-TV added up until the start of WGN America's conversion into a conventional cable channel. From 2008 to 2014, WGN-TV anchors referenced the WGN America simulcast at the beginning of each nationally televised newscast; until the WGN News at Nine simulcast was dropped, these references were excluded from the newscast's weekend editions and in situations where it was preempted from being shown on the national feed.

As part of the channel's programming separation from WGN-TV to accommodate original and acquired programs, WGN America began removing the WGN-TV news simulcasts from its schedule over the course of 2014. The 9:00 p.m. news simulcast was discontinued after the January 30, 2014, edition, while its companion Sunday sports highlight program Instant Replay – which began airing nationally with the program's WGN-TV debut in August 1988 – last aired nationally four days prior on January 26; accordingly, the channel also ceased airing certain specials produced by the WGN-TV news department and many of chief meteorologist Tom Skilling's weather specials, which typically aired following half-hour abbreviated editions of the newscast. Although Tribune Broadcasting CEO Matt Cherniss stated that he did not expect for the newscast's removal to cause any issues with viewers, disapproval of the move by some former Chicago residents living elsewhere in the United States resulted in the creation of a Facebook page asking for the broadcast to be returned to WGN America's schedule, citing concerns about a perceived inability to stay updated on news from the Chicago area. Regular news simulcasts were dropped from WGN America with the removal of the noon hour of the WGN Midday News on December 13, 2014, although some cable providers carrying the channel on their limited basic programming tiers continued to simulcast the first two hours of the weekday morning newscast – which the channel began clearing on February 3, 2014, at with the addition of the 4:00 a.m. (Central) hour of the broadcast, with the 5:00 am. CT hour being added on December 15, 2014 – in the interim until carriage agreements were amended to allow the national WGN to move to their expanded basic tiers. (The 6:00 to 10:00 am. CT block was not cleared due to the restrictions on paid segments, though the 5:00 a.m. hour was also restricted from being shown in some markets and substituted with paid programming.)

==== Other WGN-TV programming ====
Aside from programming shared by both the local and national superstation feeds that were cleared for "full-signal" carriage, other non-news and public affairs-based local programs shared by both feeds prior to WGN America's December 2014 restructuring as a conventional cable network have included the local children's programs The Bozo Show (which debuted on WGN-TV on June 20, 1960, and aired over the national feed in its various incarnations from November 1978 until its 41-year run concluded on July 14, 2001) and Ray Rayner and His Friends (a variety series featuring animated shorts, arts and crafts, animal, science and viewer mail segments that debuted on WGN-TV in 1962 and aired on the national feed from November 1978 until it was discontinued by the Chicago signal in 1980), and the family-oriented film showcase Family Classics (which debuted on WGN-TV on September 14, 1962, and aired on the local and national feeds until the program's original run ended on December 25, 2000).

The national exposure it received through WGN-TV's superstation reach helped turn The Bozo Show into the most well-known iteration of the Bozo franchise. As a result, at the peak of its popularity, ticket reservations for the show's studio audience surpassed a ten-year backlog through reservations made by Chicago-area viewers and some viewers from outside the Chicago market.

WGN America also aired other Chicago-based programs produced by WGN's local programming department via simulcast or on a delayed basis, such as local parades, event coverage and retrospective shows on WGN-TV's past, including the McDonald's Thanksgiving Parade (which aired from 2007 to 2014), the Chicago St. Patrick's Day Parade (which aired from 1979 until 2002), the Chicago Auto Show (from 1979 to 1992 and again from 1999 to 2002), the Bud Billiken Parade (from 1979 to 2011) and Bozo, Gar and Ray: WGN TV Classics (a retrospective special chronicling WGN-TV's three signature children's programs, The Bozo Show, Garfield Goose and Friends and Ray Rayner and His Friends that premiered in 2006). The national distribution also both helped bring exposure to and complicated distribution of syndicated programs produced at the WGN-TV studios in Chicago's North Center neighborhood, including The Phil Donahue Show, the U.S. Farm Report, and At the Movies.

WGN America also formerly aired live Illinois Lottery drawing results, making it the only U.S. state lottery which had their drawings—including multi-jurisdictional games—televised nationally. Live drawings initially aired over the national feed as a half-hour Thursday night broadcast (then hosted by Ray Rayner) held at its North Center studios in Chicago beginning in November 1978, and transitioned into shorter, daily drawings with the introduction of the Daily Game (now Pick 3) in February 1980, running until the local lottery rights shifted to WFLD in December 1984; the drawings returned to the national feed upon their return to WGN-TV within the Chicago area in January 1987, continuing to air over both feeds until the lottery rights moved locally to WBBM-TV in December 1992. Citing in part the station's statewide cable distribution (which, after the SyndEx rules were implemented, would occasionally subject the evening drawings to preemption associated with that of the delayed 9:00 p.m. newscast when sports clearance restrictions applied to the WGN national feed), the Lottery moved its live evening telecasts back to the WGN local and national feeds on January 1, 1994, airing by then at 9:22 pm. CT during the prime time news simulcast; midday drawings for Pick 3 and Pick 4 were added upon their introduction on December 20, 1994. (The 12:40 p.m. drawings were shown during WGN's noon newscast on weekdays, while the Saturday drawing was usually not shown live nationally because of programming substitutions; however, if newscasts aired in the drawings' designated time periods were pre-empted or were not provided by both WGN-TV and WGN America during the scheduled draw times, the winning numbers were instead shown as either a static full-screen or lower-third graphic. The Iowa Lottery used Illinois' lottery numbers for its own daily Pick 3 and Pick 4 games as a result of the channel's widespread distribution in that state until April 2014, coinciding with the then-ongoing phaseout of WGN's national carriage of lottery drawings.)

In addition to the live drawing results, the WGN national feed carried two lottery-produced weekly game shows shown on WGN-TV: $100,000 Fortune Hunt (which aired from September 16, 1989, to December 19, 1992, and from January 8 until July 2, 1994) and its successor, Illinois Instant Riches (which would later be retitled Illinois' Luckiest in 1998, and aired on the local and national feeds from July 9, 1994, to October 21, 2000). WGN America also effectively acted as the default drawing broadcaster for Mega Millions—beginning with its September 1996 inception as The Big Game—and Powerball—beginning when Illinois became a participant in January 2010—in areas of lottery-participating states where neither multi-state lottery had their drawings televised by a local station. Both games were broadcast on their respective drawing nights (Tuesdays and Fridays for The Big Game/Mega Millions; Wednesdays and Saturdays for Powerball) at 10:59 pm. Eastern Time, except during ongoing sports telecasts. The nighttime drawings for the Pick 3, Pick 4, Lotto with Extra Shot and Lucky Day Lotto (formerly Little Lotto until 2011) as well as Powerball and Mega Millions were dropped with the removal of the 9:00 p.m. news simulcast on January 31, 2014, with the midday drawings following suit on December 15.

Through WGN-TV's longtime partnership with the Muscular Dystrophy Association (MDA) as its Chicago Love Network station, WGN America had simulcast the charity's annual Labor Day weekend telethon each September from 1979 to 2012. Through its national distribution, donations to the WGN-produced local segments of the telethon during this timeframe were also pledged by viewers in other parts of the United States and Canada that received the feed. The MDA ended the telethon's syndication distribution following the 2012 edition, simultaneously ending WGN-TV's rights to the telethon and the WGN America simulcast.

==== Sports programming ====
Beginning at its inception via United Video's uplink of the WGN-TV signal for cable and satellite distribution, WGN America carried most sporting events produced and aired by its now-former Chicago broadcast parent. From November 1978 until December 2014, the national channel aired all Major League Baseball (MLB) games involving the Chicago Cubs and Chicago White Sox, and, to varying amounts depending on the season and legal issues, regular season and preseason National Basketball Association (NBA) games involving the Chicago Bulls intended for local telecast by WGN-TV. However, its national broadcasts of professional sports events (as well as those by other national and regional superstations) resulted in conflicts with the two sports leagues during the 1980s and 1990s; commissioners with the NBA and MLB and many individual teams – except for the Cubs, the Bulls and other teams which benefited from the national exposure they received from the broadcasts – contended that superstation telecasts of sporting events diluted the value of their national television contracts with other broadcast and cable networks. Sports events shown on WGN-TV that were embargoed from national telecast over WGN America were substituted with either movies or syndicated programming, though this consequently resulted in the national preemption of the 9:00 p.m. newscast during instances when nationally embargoed prime time games overran into the timeslot and delayed the newscast within the Chicago market.

In 1982, the NBA began prohibiting WGN and other superstations with a national out-of-market reach totaling at least 5% of all cable households from airing games that conflicted with those airing on its national cable partners (at the time, ESPN and USA Network), expanding it to a set 25-game-per-season limit on the number of seasonal NBA telecasts that could be licensed to superstations (sixteen fewer than the 41-game maximum under existing NBA local broadcast rules) in June 1985. A further reduction in annual superstation-licensed NBA telecasts to 20 games in April 1990 – stemming from the concurring re-acquisitions of the Bulls rights by WGN and the Atlanta Hawks television rights by TBS – resulted in a 5½-year legal battle that began with a conspiracy and antitrust lawsuit filed by Bulls parent Chicago Professional Sports L.P. and Tribune Broadcasting in the U.S. District Court for the Northern District of Illinois on October 16, 1990, alleging that the new rules would harm the Bulls, their fans and WGN and was aimed at "phas[ing] out such superstations telecasts entirely in increments of five games each year over the next five years." Several rulings on the matter were decided upon during the course of the proceedings, beginning with a permanent injunction issued by Judge Hubert L. Will on January 26, 1991, prohibiting the league from instituting the 25-game policy upon determining the NBA's superstation licensing restrictions were "a significant restraint of trade" in violation of the Sherman Antitrust Act, a decision that was upheld on subsequent appeals heard by the Seventh Circuit Court of Appeals (on April 14, 1991) and the U.S. Supreme Court (on November 5, 1991) and by Will in the Northern Illinois District Court (on January 6, 1995), the latter of whom noted that evidence "revealed that superstation coverage of the Bulls and Hawks may actually have helped to promote greater public interest in NBA basketball."

During each of the appeals, attorneys with the NBA, WGN-TV and the Bulls agreed to allow the WGN Chicago and superstation feeds to televise at least 30 games over the between the 1992–93 and 1995–96 seasons; upon the 1995 appeal, the NBA was also allowed to impose a fee of around $40,000 (rather than the $100,000 licensing fee sought by the NBA) for each game broadcast, based on the consideration that the league received more than $2 million in annual copyright payments from WGN's Bulls broadcasts. A judiciary panel with the Seventh Circuit Court of Appeals overturned the 1992 decision on September 10, 1996; as a consequence, WGN-TV chose to relegate the 35 Bulls games it was scheduled to air during the 1996–97 season exclusively to the Chicago area signal. TCI cited the national restrictions on the Bulls, along with its own decision to make room for additional cable networks pending future upgrades to their headend infrastructures to accommodate digital cable service, for its subsequent decision to remove the national WGN channel from its U.S. systems outside the Chicago market, even though the national feed's removal would reduce access Cubs and White Sox games it would continue to air and would create holes in The WB's national coverage in many medium-sized and smaller markets. Around 3.5 million TCI subscribers nationwide lost access to the WGN national feed by March 1997, with some of the affected TCI systems not reinstating WGN onto their channel lineups until as late as 1998, through an effort by Tribune and United Video to take advantage of TBS's conversion into a hybrid basic cable network by further expanding the superstation feed's national distribution; however, criticism from some subscribers over the decision led TCI to rescind plans to remove the superstation feed from affected systems in Illinois, Indiana, Iowa, Wisconsin and Michigan. On December 12, 1996, the Bulls and WGN reached a settlement with the NBA, which conceded to allow WGN-TV to air the league's 41-game broadcast maximum during the 1996–97 season (35 games that would only air on the Chicago signal and twelve others that would be shown on both the local and superstation feeds). From the 1997–98 season thereafter, the number of games permitted to air on the superstation feed increased to 15 per year. The parties also agreed to replace the NBA's superstation tax with a revenue sharing model, under which the NBA would collect 50% of all advertising revenue accrued from the national WGN telecasts. The restrictions, however, resulted in some Bulls away games televised by the WGN national feed being unavailable to television providers within the opposing team's designated market if the game was not carried by a national network, a local television station or a regional sports network.

Similar apparent punitive efforts by MLB Commissioner Fay Vincent to curb superstation telecasts of Major League Baseball games – including petitions to the FCC to change how its non-duplication rules define a "network program" to force cable systems to blackout superstation-licensed live sports broadcasts and to Congress for the repeal the Copyright Act's compulsory license statute – resulted in his July 1992 order to relocate the Chicago Cubs and the St. Louis Cardinals to the National League West and the Atlanta Braves (then also transmitted over TBS) and the Cincinnati Reds) to the National League East starting with the 1993 season. Though the Braves' WTBS telecasts and WGN's telecasts of the American League White Sox would have experienced no major effects as both teams had already played a large number of West Coast games for years, the move was seen by some as targeting WGN directly. Tribune representatives accused Vincent of using the conference realignment in his efforts and those of some MLB team owners to weaken availability of sporting events over superstations, raising concerns of negative impacts to revenue incurred by WGN-TV from its Cubs telecasts—which the Cubs denied were part of its reasoning behind its opposition to the realignment—if the team was forced to play an increased number of games against other Pacific Time Zone-based Western Division teams that started in the late evening in the eastern half of the country and to local advertising revenue for its prime time newscast if the station had to delay it after 9:00 pm. Central Time more frequently because of the late baseball starts. Tribune responded with a breach of contract lawsuit alleging Vincent overstepped his authority in ordering the realignment. U.S. District Judge Suzanne B. Conlon sided with Tribune and the Cubs in a preliminary ruling on July 23, 1992, six weeks before Vincent was voted out as MLB Commissioner in an 18–9–1 motion of no confidence among team owners on September 4 and his subsequent resignation two days after said vote.

Due to broadcast rights restrictions imposed by the NHL to protect the league's exclusive national broadcasting contracts (in particular, its longstanding deal with ESPN that lasted until the league's 2007–08 season and a succeeding joint broadcast-cable contract with NBCUniversal that commenced with the 2008–09 season), WGN America was prohibited from carrying National Hockey League (NHL) games involving the Chicago Blackhawks – the only major professional sports franchise based in Chicago that had their WGN-TV-televised regular season games be fully embargoed from the former superstation feed – that the local Chicago signal began airing with the start of the 2007–08 season. Even prior to the decision to remove sports from WGN America's schedule entirely, the channel had chosen not to air certain sports-related programming carried on the Chicago signal such as the Blackhawks' victory parade following its 2010 Stanley Cup championship win and a half-hour special paying tribute to the late Cubs player and broadcaster Ron Santo in 2011.

As part of the network's conversion from a superstation into a general entertainment cable channel, on May 30, 2014, Tribune announced that WGN America would phase out national carriage of WGN-TV-originated Chicago Cubs, Bulls and White Sox game telecasts by the end of that year. Peter Liguori, president and CEO of Tribune Media at the time, cited the limited revenue and viewership accrued from the national simulcasts relative to their contractual expense – revenue was reportedly only covering 20% of the rights fees – behind the decision to drop the national telecasts. Several seasons of sub-par play by the Cubs after Tribune's sale of the team to Thomas S. Ricketts in late 2009 also played a factor, as the team's television package cost five times as much for rights fees alone as the revenue it brought in for the national broadcasts. Although WGN America did air the Cubs' World Series victory parade on November 4, 2016. The final WGN Sports-produced game telecast to air on WGN America was a contest between the Bulls and the Golden State Warriors, held at Chicago's United Center, on December 6, 2014.

Even after the removal of most WGN Sports-produced telecasts from its schedule, WGN America has continued to air certain sporting events with national implications, including coverage of the Los Angeles Marathon from sister station KTLA, and Illinois-based horse racing events that serve as a prep race for any Grand Slam of Thoroughbred Racing event and does not have a national television deal, such as the Arlington Million.

== Availability ==
WGN America was available on most multichannel television providers (including cable, satellite, IPTV and fiber-optic-based services) within the United States. However, the channel had somewhat scattershot coverage (outside satellite distribution) in portions of the Western United States and much of the New England region through its existence as a superstation until distribution in those areas began expanding after the 2014 conversion to a traditional entertainment cable network. Moreover, some multichannel providers in various markets where Tribune Broadcasting had owned a television station prior to the closure of the group's purchase by Nexstar did not carry WGN America. In particular, the channel was not available in portions of the New York City metropolitan area (the home market of sister station WPIX) until January 15, 2016, when Cablevision (now Optimum Communications) began to carry WGN America as part of a broader deal that also saw Cablevision's then-parent subsidiary, Cablevision Systems Corporation, acquire Tribune Media's 2.8% ownership interest in Newsday Holdings. In the Chicago metropolitan area, beginning with the 2014 transition, WGN America was carried by the three major cable television providers serving the immediate area (Comcast Xfinity, RCN and WOW!, the latter two since consolidated into Astound Broadband) and streaming providers, in addition to the WGN-TV broadcast signal. Prior to its conversion into a basic-tier channel in December 2014, Chicago-area residents could only receive WGN America through satellite providers Dish Network and DirecTV.

Since its conversion from a superstation, WGN America was targeted in Tribune Media's retransmission consent negotiations with cable and satellite providers as an extraneous asset providers would like to pay less for, noting that most of the channel's programming at the time was also syndicated to other broadcast and cable-originated networks. (Examples as of 2019 include Blue Bloods [which also airs on Ion Television], Murder, She Wrote [aired on Hallmark Movies & Mysteries], Last Man Standing [aired on CMT and in broadcast syndication], and In the Heat of the Night [aired on MeTV and This TV].) Disagreements over contractual terms resulted in Charter Communications removing WGN America and Tribune-owned television stations licensed to markets serviced by the provider from its Spectrum systems nationwide for nine days in January 2019, with Spectrum—in a looping message shown over the channels occupied by the Tribune stations during the dispute-induced blackout—referring to WGN America as a network "which very few people watch" in its defense of their position in the negotiations. Similarly, one of the sticking points in a dispute between Nexstar and Dish Network involved carrying WGN America on its satellite systems and Sling TV, which Dish owns.

=== Canadian distribution ===
In April 1985, the Canadian Radio-television and Telecommunications Commission (CRTC) approved eligibility for the signals of WGN-TV and fellow American superstations WTBS, WOR-TV and WPIX to be retransmitted as foreign services by multichannel television providers within Canada. Under CRTC linkage rules first implemented in 1983 that require providers to offer U.S.-based program services in discretionary tiers tied to Canadian services, WGN-TV/WGN America and other authorized U.S. superstations typically have been sold to prospective subscribers of one or more domestic premium services – such as Crave (formerly First Choice and The Movie Network), Starz (formerly Moviepix and The Movie Network Encore), Super Channel, Super Écran and Western Canada-based regional pay services Movie Central (the original user of the Superchannel name, now defunct) and Encore Avenue (also now defunct). However, some providers have chosen to offer WGN in a specialty tier under a related rule that allows for an eligible superstation of the provider's choice to be carried on a non-premium tier. (Although KWGN-TV has also been authorized for carriage by the CRTC since that point, the Denver sister station is not carried on any multichannel television providers within Canada.)

After United Video began offering a separate national feed of WGN upon the stateside implementation the Syndex rules in January 1990, most Canadian cable providers began to replace the Chicago signal with the superstation feed as well. (Among the country's satellite providers, Star Choice [now Shaw Direct] began carrying the national feed upon the satellite provider's 1994 launch; Bell ExpressVu! [now Bell Satellite TV] began distributing the Chicago-area signal when it commenced operations in 1996.) During its four-year tenure as the network's national feed, the WGN national feed provided WB network programs to areas of Canada (mainly those far from the Canadian–U.S. border) out of the signal reach of other American-based WB affiliates; however, simultaneous substitution rules have applied to certain WB programs that were concurrently carried by Canadian-based terrestrial networks (such as NewNet and A-Channel).

Canadian distribution of the feed then known as Superstation WGN was reduced significantly on January 17, 2007, when WGN's main Canadian uplink carrier, Shaw Broadcast Services, switched its distributed feed of the station to the Chicago signal, a decision believed to have resulted from increased licensing fees for carriage of the then-superstation feed. Despite this, some providers continued to carry the national WGN channel in lieu of or – as was the case with providers such as MTS TV and Cogeco Cable – in tandem with the Chicago feed, resulting in the duplication of CW network and many syndicated programs that are available within the country on other networks (such as fellow superstations KTLA and Boston-based WSBK-TV). While CRTC had approved the Chicago station's broadcast signal and its national cable feed for carriage on any domestic multichannel television provider, the conversion of WGN America from a superstation into an independent general-entertainment service and its resulting programming separation from WGN-TV led Tribune Broadcasting to announce on December 15, 2014, that it would terminate all Canadian distribution rights for WGN America, effective January 1, 2015, a move likely done to comply with then-CRTC-enforced genre protection rules that prohibited domestic or foreign channels from maintaining a general entertainment programming format. However, most providers across Canada – including some that lost access to WGN America – continue to receive WGN-TV (which, in addition to being available to premium channel subscribers, had also previously been available as part of the NHL Centre Ice sports package, primarily for simulcasts of Chicago Blackhawks games that WGN-TV aired until the 2018–19 season), as the station is still authorized for domestic distribution as a superstation.

== See also ==
In relation to WGN America's prior history as a cable-originated affiliate of The WB, the following articles discuss similar cable-only affiliates of broadcast television networks:

- The WB 100+ Station Group – a station group created by The WB as a sub-national network feed in September 1998, made up of mostly locally managed cable-only television outlets in small and mid-sized U.S. markets that did not have an over-the-air affiliate, which superseded WGN America's de facto WB affiliate status for these areas
- The CW Plus – successor of The WB 100+; a station group and sub-national network feed made up primarily of cable-only outlets that formerly served as affiliates of The WB 100+ Station Group and digital multicast channels
- Foxnet – a similar cable-only network for markets without a Fox affiliate, that operated from 1991 to 2006
- Univision – American Spanish-language network that offers a national cable/satellite feed for markets without a local affiliate
- UniMás – American Spanish-language network that offers a national cable/satellite feed for markets without a local affiliate
- Telemundo – American Spanish-language network that offers a national cable/satellite feed for markets without a local affiliate
- Azteca América – defunct American Spanish-language network operating from 2001 to 2022, which offered a national cable/satellite feed for markets without a local affiliate
- Estrella TV – American Spanish-language network that offers a national cable/satellite feed for markets without a local affiliate
- CTV 2 Alberta – a cable-originated affiliate of CTV 2 in the Canadian province of Alberta
- CTV 2 Atlantic – a similar cable-originated affiliate of CTV 2 in Atlantic Canada
- Citytv Saskatchewan – a similar cable-originated affiliate of the Citytv television network in the Canadian province of Saskatchewan
