= First Choice Superchannel =

First Choice Superchannel may refer to either of the following Canadian pay television services, which were jointly marketed under this name from 1984 to 1989:

- The Movie Network, a pay television service serving eastern Canada (known as First Choice 1983–1984 and 1989–1993)
- Movie Central, a pay television service serving western and northern Canada (known as Superchannel 1983–1984 and 1989–2001)
  - Not to be confused with the currently-operating Canadian service named Super Channel, which launched in 2007
