= Cinépop =

Canadian French-language TV channel

- Country: Canada
- Broadcast area: National
- Headquarters: Montreal, Quebec

Programming
- Language(s): French
- Picture format: 480i (SDTV); 1080i (HDTV)

Ownership
- Owner: Astral Media (2005–2013); Bell Media (2013–present)
- Sister channels: Crave; Starz; HBO; Super Écran; Vu! Venus

History
- Launched: November 1, 2005; 19 years ago

Links
- Website: cinepop.ca

Cinépop is a Canadian French language Category B pay television channel owned by Bell Media. Cinépop broadcasts films from the 1950s to the present without commercial interruption.

== History ==
In November 2000, Astral Media, through its subsidiary Astral Télé Réseaux inc., was granted approval by the Canadian Radio-television and Telecommunications Commission (CRTC) to launch a television channel called Cinémania, described as "a national French-language Category 2 pay television service including a diverse selection of popular Canadian and international general-interest feature-length repertory fiction movies."

The channel was launched on November 1, 2005 as Cinépop (stylized as cinépop until 2008) focusing on feature films from the 1950s to the present.

In November 2008, Cinépop introduced a new look including a new logo and on-screen graphics.

On January 28, 2011, Cinépop launched "Cinépop HD", a high definition feed simulcasting its standard definition feed. It is available through select major television providers in the country.

On March 4, 2013, the Competition Bureau approved the takeover of Astral Media by Bell Media. Bell filed a new application for the proposed takeover with the CRTC on March 6, 2013; the CRTC approved the merger on June 27, 2013, and was completed on July 5.

A new logo and branding was launched in 2016, and began to air more modern movies, most of which aired on Super Écran.

On January 21, 2020, Cinépop's sister channel's platform, Super Écran Go, which Cinépop shared its TV Everywhere features with, has been decommissioned after Super Écran has been added as an addon on the Crave streaming platform. Cinépop's video on demand and TV Everywhere features remains on the television providers' platforms.

== Logos ==
2005–2008

2008–2016

HD logo from 2011 to 2016

2016–present
