= Encore Avenue =

Former Canadian premium TV network

- Encore Avenue logo
- Country: Canada
- Broadcast area: Western Canada and Territories
- Headquarters: Toronto, Ontario

Programming
- Language: English
- Picture format: 1080i (HDTV); 480i (SDTV)

Ownership
- Owner: Corus Entertainment
- Sister channels: Movie Central; HBO Canada

History
- Launched: October 1, 1994; 32 years ago
- Closed: March 1, 2016; 10 years ago
- Replaced by: The Movie Network Encore
- Former names: MovieMax! (1994–2001)

Encore Avenue was a Canadian English language Category A premium cable and satellite television channel that was owned by Corus Entertainment. Encore Avenue was designated to operate west of the Ontario-Manitoba border, including the territories. The channel offered a variety of classic films from the 1970s to the 1990s, with films from the early 2000s interspersed within the schedule.

The service's programming was comparable to that of TMN Encore, a separately-owned pay service (and sister channel to Crave (known as The Movie Network at the time)) that was marketed to Eastern Canada, serving areas located east of the Ontario-Manitoba border. On March 1, 2016, Movie Central and Encore Avenue were shut down by Corus, with subscribers migrated to The Movie Network and TMN Encore.

== History ==
The channel was launched on October 1, 1994 as MovieMax!, operating as a sister network to premium movie service Superchannel (now Movie Central). The channel originally focused on movies from the 1960s, 1970s, and 1980s, but later expanded its film library to include films from earlier decades (as its licence allows the channel to air movies that were released up to five years from the present year). The channel was originally owned by Western International Communications. In the late 1990s, after digital cable and satellite television became available in Canada, MovieMax! launched a multiplex channel called MovieMax! 2, which was available initially on satellite only (and operated as a two-hour timeshift channel of the main MovieMax! channel).

Duelling takeover bids for, and eventual 2000 split of, WIC resulted in Superchannel and MovieMax! being acquired by Corus Entertainment. On April 1, 2001, Superchannel and MovieMax! were rebranded under the umbrella brand Movie Central, which consisted of six diverse channels utilizing a common street-themed branding scheme: Movie Central, Adrenaline Drive (focusing on action movies), Heartland Road (focusing on romance films), Shadow Lane (focusing on horror/suspense films), Encore Avenue (focusing on classic movies), and Comic Strip (focusing on comedy films).

On March 1, 2006, the sub-brands were dropped due to confusion among Movie Central subscribers regarding the meanings of the channel's names; four of the channels remained under the Movie Central brand (but using numbered names rather than a combination of the parent network's name and a sub-brand, a common naming scheme for North American premium television services), and the two remaining channels became Encore Avenue, each of which were still diverse in their schedules. The Encore Avenue channels adopted a format of films from the 1970s, 1980s, and 1990s, possibly due to the introduction of TCM in Canada.

Encore Avenue ceased operations at 6:00 A.M. Pacific Time on March 1, 2016. The reason for that is that Corus Entertainment shut down the channel and its sister network Movie Central to accommodate the national expansion of Bell Media's The Movie Network and sister channel TMN Encore.

== Channels ==
=== List of channels ===
Depending on the service provider, Encore Avenue provided up to four multiplex channels – two 24-hour multiplex channels, both of which were simulcast in both standard definition and high definition.

Sister service Movie Central operated as a separate service under a separate licence – and subscribers to one of the two services did not necessarily have to subscribe to the other. However, Encore Avenue was very frequently sold together in a package with Movie Central. Encore Avenue broadcast its primary and multiplex channels on a Pacific Time Zone schedule. Because Encore Avenue operated a singular feed and its license was restricted to broadcast solely in a geographical area covered by the Pacific, Mountain and Central time zones, this resulted in the difference in local airtimes for a particular movie or program between two geographic locations being three hours at most.

Channel	Description and programming
Encore Avenue	The flagship service; this channel mainly broadcast films from the 1970s, 1980s, 1990s and early 2000s.
Encore Avenue 2	A secondary service that also offered films from the 1970s, 1980s, 1990s and early 2000s; it was formerly named Comic Strip from April 1, 2001 to March 1, 2006. This channel aired a different schedule of movies from the main channel, but it drew from the same programming library.

=== Other services ===
==== Encore Avenue HD ====
Encore Avenue HD was a high definition simulcast feed of Encore Avenue that broadcast in the 1080i resolution format. In addition to its main channel, Encore Avenue also operated a high definition simulcast feed of its multiplex channel Encore Avenue 2. The main Encore Avenue channel originally launched its HD simulcast feed on April 24, 2008; the HD feed of Encore Avenue 2 followed on August 15, 2013. Among others, Encore Avenue HD was currently carried regionally by satellite providers Shaw Direct and Bell Satellite TV, IPTV provider MTS TV, and cable providers Shaw Cable, Novus, Access Communications, Cogeco, Telus TV and Westman Communications. These channels shut down on March 1, 2016.
