= Super Channel (Canadian TV channel) =

Canadian premium TV channel

Super Channel Entertainment Network
- Country: Canada
- Broadcast area: Nationwide
- Headquarters: Edmonton, Alberta

Programming
- Language: English
- Picture format: 1080i (HDTV); 480i (SDTV)

Ownership
- Owner: Allarco Entertainment

History
- Launched: November 2, 2007; 18 years ago

Links
- Website: www.superchannel.ca

Availability

Streaming media
- Amazon Prime Channels: Over-the-top TV
- Roku: Over-the-top TV
- RiverTV: Over-the-top TV

Super Channel Entertainment Network (formally and commonly known as Super Channel) is a Canadian English language premium cable and satellite television channel owned by Allarco Entertainment 2008 Inc. Super Channel's programming primarily includes theatrically released, first to television motion pictures and television series, along with documentaries and other niche programs.

The current Super Channel service was launched in 2007, and is not affiliated with the two pre-existing English-language premium channels which used the name at various times prior to 2001, which were later known as Movie Central (in Western Canada; defunct since March 2016) and The Movie Network (in Eastern Canada; merged with CraveTV and rebranded as Crave in 2018). The Allards were the original owners of Movie Central, and later re-acquired rights to the Superchannel trademark.

Prior to 2016, Super Channel was the first and only general-interest English-language pay television service authorized to operate nationally. Family Channel (with its multiplex channel Family Jr.) was the only other national pay television channel, though it would operate as a de facto basic tier specialty channel.

Super Channel is available on nearly all major cable, IPTV and satellite providers including Telus Optik TV, Bell Satellite TV, Shaw Direct, Access Communications, Cogeco, Rogers Cable, Shaw Cable, Eastlink, SaskTel, Westman Communications, Bell MTS, Novus, VMedia, RiverTV, Amazon Channels, Apple TV Channels and other providers. Super Channel was granted as a "must carry" service by the Canadian Radio-television and Telecommunications Commission (CRTC), meaning all television service providers must carry the service on their systems.

== History ==
=== Background and pre-launch ===
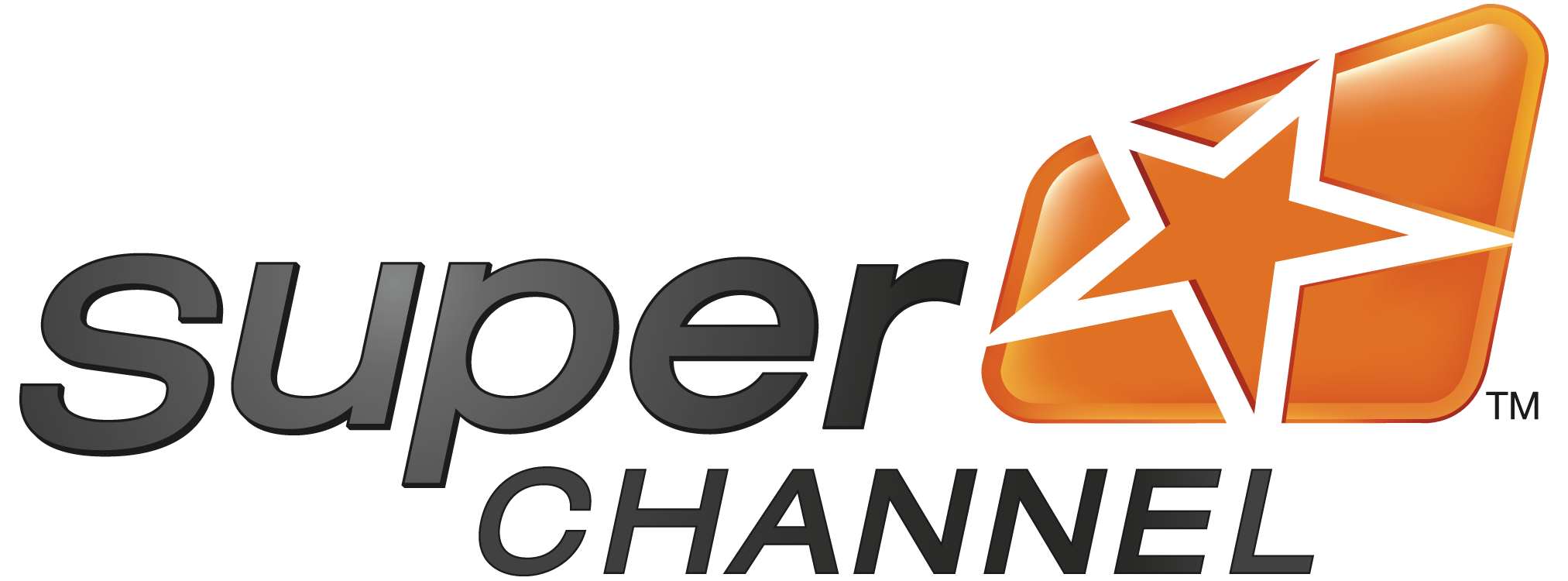
Super Channel original logo from 2007 to 2018

The Allard family were the original owners of Movie Central, which during their stewardship until 2001 was known as "Superchannel" (rendered as a single word title). For a time in the 1980s, First Choice (now the Pay TV counterpart to the Crave streaming service) had also used the "Superchannel" name under a co-branding agreement). The "Movie Central" name was adopted shortly after Corus Entertainment acquired the service, but Corus maintained ownership of the "Superchannel" trademark. Just before the new channel's launch, the Allards re-acquired the rights to the "Superchannel" name under undisclosed terms.

Allarco was one of four applicants for new pay television licences that were considered at a public hearing held by the Canadian Radio-television and Telecommunications Commission on October 24, 2005. Its competing applicants were:

- BOOMTV, to be operated by the Archambault unit of Quebecor Media. While it was expected to compete directly with the existing general-interest services – The Movie Network (now Crave) and Movie Central (TMN/MC) in English Canada and Super Écran (SE) in French Canada – Archambault indicated that its services would have regularly favoured first-run dramatic series. Archambault was also the only applicant for a French-language service, but indicated that this licence would be worthless without an English counterpart.
- The Canadian Film Channel, proposed by Channel Zero Inc. It proposed to broadcast 100% Canadian content and be funded entirely by the operators of TMN/MC, in an amount equal to 12.9% of these services' gross revenues, to be required by condition of licence. Neither incumbent indicated approval for such a use of its revenues.
- Spotlight Television, to be controlled by George Burger, a former executive at Alliance Television, and professional sports mogul Larry Tanenbaum, chairman of the private investment company Kilmer Van Nostrand, which proposed a premium service much in the same vein as The Movie Network/Movie Central. It is believed that, had Spotlight's application been successful, it would have been branded as a Canadian version of the American service HBO; an "HBO Canada" channel was launched in October 2008 under the auspices of TMN/MC.

The Allarco application was approved on May 18, 2006, while the other three applicants were rejected. Super Channel would be launched on November 2, 2007, on Bell Satellite TV.

Initially, Allarco launched two high definition feeds upon the launch of the service in November 2007: Super Channel HD 1 and Super Channel HD 2. Super Channel HD 1 simulcast the standard definition feed of the same name, while Super Channel HD 2 initially aired programming from the three remaining SD feeds. In February 2013, Allarco launched HD feeds for the two remaining channels, Super Channel 3 and Super Channel 4.

=== Bankruptcy ===
Two years after Super Channel's launch, parent company, Allarco Entertainment entered into the Companies' Creditors Arrangement Act on June 18, 2009. On August 31, 2010, its creditors unanimously approved a restructuring plan for the company under the act. The restructuring plan, which needed approval of the court, was later approved.

On May 26, 2016, Allarco filed for bankruptcy a second time. The next round of submissions to the court were due on April 21, 2017. As part of this process 96 of the 135 licensed content agreements for Super Channel were terminated.

On February 15, 2017, it was announced that a Canadian version of Ginx TV would launch as a replacement for one of Super Channel's multiplex channels. Replacing Super Channel 4, Ginx eSports TV Canada launched on May 4, 2017, with a live Canadian edition of The Bridge, a late night talk show.

On February 22, 2017, Super Channel announced it had acquired the Canadian broadcast rights to the Legends Football League, as part of a three-year deal in which Super Channel will be the exclusive Canadian broadcaster of all LFL games through the 2019 season. The LFL will be used to launch the "Super Channel Sports" sub-brand that will be used for all sporting events and sports-themed programming. Super Channel 1 debuted LFL Football Night on April 22, 2017.

On April 4, 2017, Super Channel announced that it would rebrand Super Channel 3 as Super Channel Vault on April 28, 2017. The channel is described as offering programming based on "a collection of hand-picked, fan-favourites, critically-acclaimed films."

=== Reemergence ===
In 2018, after emerging from creditor protection, Allarco announced the relaunch of Super Channel with the rebranding of SC1 and SC2 as Super Channel Fuse and Super Channel Heart & Home, and the service adopting the "Super Channel Entertainment Network" branding.

In 2020, the service announced a partnership with the Canadian Film Festival to broadcast the films that had been slated to premiere at the festival prior to its cancellation due to the COVID-19 pandemic in Canada.

In 2023, Super Channel would expand into streaming media with launch of Super Channel+ via Roku in September, and the Super Channel Uncovered and Super Channel Hearties FAST channels in October.

On September 4, 2024, Ginx eSports TV Canada was replaced by Super Channel Quest, a new channel focused primarily on documentaries and factual television; the new channel subsumes most of the docuseries that were aired by Super Channel Fuse, aside from true crime programs. Some Ginx programming will continue to air on Quest. Allarco stated that the channel would launch with a 100% Canadian content schedule.

In March 2025, the network updated its logo to include a maple leaf, and adopted the new slogan "Canadian, Always", in a move to emphasize its broadcasting of Canadian programming.

== Programming ==
Super Channel's main programming consists of and both theatrically released and made for TV movies, including domestically produced programming, shows acquired from U.S cable networks, foreign films, and international series.

From its launch until December 2015, Super Channel was the broadcaster for 20th Century Studios films from January 2007 to February 2015. The Movie Network took over the deal in January 2016 for releases starting in March 2015. These rights were shared with Disney+ in Canada, and effective 2021, sister channel Starz Canada broadcasts the entire back catalogue.

=== Channels ===
Through service providers, Super Channel provides four multiplex channels, all of which are simulcast in both standard definition and high definition – as well as a subscription video-on-demand service (Super Channel On Demand):

Channel	Description and programming
Super Channel Fuse	Focuses primarily on general interest movies, television series, true crime programming, and concerts.
Super Channel Heart & Home	Focuses on general interest movies and television series targeting family viewing.
Super Channel Vault	Focuses primarily on "fan favourite" and "critically acclaimed" films.
Super Channel Quest	Focuses primarily on documentary and docuseries programming.

==== Super Channel On Demand ====
Super Channel operates a subscription video-on-demand television service called Super Channel On Demand, which is available at no additional charge to new and existing subscribers of Super Channel. Content featured on the service includes movies, acquired foreign series and special features previously seen on the linear television network.

=== Original programs ===
- 24 Hour Rental
- Bullet in the Face
- Clay's POV
- Darknet
- Dark Rising: Warrior of Worlds
- Fight Xchange
- Forgive Me
- Hollywood & Vines
- How I Got Here
- Naked News Uncovered
- The Next Take
- Olympus
- Slasher (2017, moved to Netflix after the first season)
- Spooksville
- Tiny Plastic Men
- Too Much Information
- Versailles
- What Would Sal Do?
- When Calls the Heart

== Other services ==
=== Super Channel+ ===
On September 25, 2023, Allarco launched a standalone subscription service for Roku devices called Super Channel+. The service offers both the linear channels and their video-on-demand content.

=== FAST Channels ===
Allarco introduced two free ad-supported streaming television channels in October 2023 as part of Tubi's launch of that service in Canada. Super Channel Uncovered is themed around true crime programming, while Super Channel Hearties focuses on romance. The two channels were added to Xumo the following month.
