= Movie Central =

Former Canadian premium TV channel

- Final logo, 2009–2016
- Country: Canada
- Broadcast area: Western Canada and Territories
- Headquarters: Toronto, Ontario

Programming
- Language: English
- Picture format: 1080i (HDTV); 480i (SDTV)

Ownership
- Owner: Corus Entertainment
- Sister channels: Encore Avenue

History
- Launched: February 1, 1983; 43 years ago
- Closed: March 1, 2016; 10 years ago (33 years, 29 days)
- Replaced by: The Movie Network
- Former names: Superchannel (1983–1984 and 1989–2001); First Choice-Superchannel (1984–1989)

Movie Central (occasionally abbreviated as "MC", mostly in program guides) was a Canadian English language Category A premium cable and satellite television channel that was owned by Corus Entertainment. Movie Central was designated to operate west of the Ontario–Manitoba border, including the territories. Although the channel's name implies that it focuses solely on theatrically released motion pictures, Movie Central's programming included original and foreign television series, made-for-cable movies and documentaries.

Movie Central was carried by various Canadian cable, IPTV, and satellite television providers in Western Canada including Bell Satellite TV, Shaw Direct, Shaw Cable, Access Communications, Telus Optik TV, and Westman, among other providers. Its programming was comparable to that of The Movie Network (TMN), a separately owned pay service which was marketed to Eastern Canada, in areas located east of the Ontario-Manitoba border. Movie Central was headquartered at the Corus Quay building in Toronto, Ontario, alongside Corus's national specialty television properties, despite that city being located outside the service's territory.

Known as Superchannel (or First Choice–Superchannel) from its launch in 1983 until 2001, the service held a regional legal monopoly on movie-based premium TV service in Western and Northern Canada from 1984 until the launch of the present-day Super Channel in 2007.

On November 19, 2015, Corus announced that it would shut down Movie Central and sister service Encore Avenue in order to focus on its specialty television services. The Movie Network, which previously held a similar regional monopoly in Eastern Canada, subsequently expanded into the West to become a national service. TMN owner Bell Media made a payment of C$211 million to Corus for its services in transitioning MC subscribers to TMN, which subsequently rebranded as Crave in late 2018.

== History ==
In 1982, the CRTC licensed Canada's first national pay television services. The commission licensed one national general-interest service – First Choice – as well as a number of short-lived niche channels, and several regional general-interest channels.

Allarcom Pay Television, owned by Charles Allard, was initially granted the regional concession for Alberta. However, by the time Allarcom's service, Superchannel, launched on February 1, 1983, Allarcom had apparently also gained control of a second regional channel, Ontario Independent Pay Television.

Early version of the Superchannel logo (used from 1983 to 1984), a later version of the logo showed the words 'First Choice' in the star.

By January 1984, Superchannel had received approval to expand its service area to Saskatchewan (replacing Teletheatre, a province-wide pay-cable network that had been operating since the late 1970s), Manitoba, and what is now the Northwest Territories and Nunavut. Allarcom also took control of Aim Satellite Broadcasting (serving British Columbia and Yukon) and provided the Superchannel feed in those markets on an "interim" basis while Aim could establish its own service.

By the spring of 1984, it became clear that the remaining pay service operators were continuing to post substantial monetary losses. In August, AIM and OIPT were merged into Allarcom's operations, and the resulting channel exited the Ontario market. Meanwhile, the formerly national service First Choice agreed to serve only Ontario, Quebec and Atlantic Canada. As part of their agreement, Allarcom and First Choice agreed to jointly market their services under the name First Choice Superchannel, in which the Superchannel "star" branding was predominant. This practice continued until 1989, at which point the "First Choice" name remained in the east and "Superchannel" was restricted to the west. With the respective launches of The Sports Network and MuchMusic in September 1984, Superchannel reduced the amount of sports programming and concert specials that it broadcast, and converted to a predominantly movie-based service, as did First Choice.

Allarcom was later acquired by Western International Communications, which launched a parallel classic movie service, MovieMax!, in the Superchannel service area in October 1994. Originally featuring movies from the 1960s, 1970s, and 1980s, the channel's programming later expanded to include older movies (its licence actually allows the channel to air movies that were released more than five years from the present year). When digital cable and satellite television became available in the 1990s, Superchannel 2 and Superchannel 3 were launched (which were essentially timeshifted versions of Superchannel on respective two- and four-hour delays), along with MovieMax! 2, which was available on satellite only (operating as a two-hour delayed feed of MovieMax!). During its years under WIC ownership, there was a noticeable difference in programming quality between the WIC services and their eastern counterparts, due largely to a 1996 lawsuit against HBO for allegedly promoting the grey-market availability of U.S.-based satellite television providers. WIC was at the time also a significant shareholder in domestic satellite provider ExpressVu (now Bell Satellite TV). In retaliation, HBO refused to license any of its programs to Superchannel.

Former Movie Central logo, used from 2001 to 2009.

The duelling takeover bids for, and eventual split of, WIC resulted in Superchannel and MovieMax! being transferred to Corus Entertainment, which settled the HBO lawsuit and began to license its programs such as The Sopranos. On April 1, 2001, Superchannel and MovieMax! were rebranded under the umbrella brand Movie Central, which consisted of six diverse channels, most of which utilized a common street-themed branding scheme: Movie Central, Adrenaline Drive (focusing on action movies), Heartland Road (focusing on romance films), Shadow Lane (focusing on horror and suspense films), Encore Avenue (focusing on classic movies), and Comic Strip (focusing on comedy films).

On March 1, 2006, the sub-brands were dropped due to confusion among subscribers regarding the meanings of the channel's names; four of the channels remained under the Movie Central brand (but using numbered names rather than a combination of the parent network's name and a sub-brand, a common naming scheme for North American premium television services), and the two remaining channels became Encore Avenue, each of which were diverse in their schedules. The Encore Avenue channels adopted a format of films from the 1970s, 1980s, and 1990s, possibly due to the introduction of Turner Classic Movies in Canada.

On November 19, 2015, Corus announced that as a result of a strategic review, it decided to exit the pay TV business in order to concentrate on its national specialty channels, and would discontinue Movie Central and Encore Avenue on March 1, 2016. It was concurrently announced that the movie channels The Movie Network and TMN Encore, now owned by Bell Media as the successor to the former First Choice, would expand into the Western Canadian markets that were previously served exclusively by Movie Central, giving them wider distribution. Bell also acquired Corus's interest in HBO Canada (a jointly operated multiplex channel of both TMN and Movie Central), giving them full ownership of the channel. Although Bell did not buy the Movie Central licence, it paid Corus C$211 million in exchange for Corus's assistance in allowing TMN's national expansion, including transitioning existing Movie Central subscribers to TMN. The CRTC quietly gave administrative approval to applications to allow TMN and TMN Encore to operate nationally in July 2015, so no further regulatory approval was required.

== Channels ==
Broadcast area (in green) that Movie Central covered before its March 1, 2016, closure.

=== List of channels ===
Depending on the service provider, Movie Central provided up to six multiplex channels – four 24-hour multiplex channels; one of which (HBO Canada) was also available on a two-hour delay, two of which were simulcast in both standard definition and high definition – as well as a subscription video-on-demand service (Movie Central On Demand). Movie Central broadcast its primary and multiplex channels on a Mountain Time Zone schedule. Because Movie Central operated a singular feed and its license was restricted to broadcast solely in a geographical area covered by the Pacific, Mountain and Central time zones, it resulted in the difference in local airtimes for a particular movie or program between two geographic locations being three hours at most.

The premium classic film service Encore Avenue, also owned by Corus Entertainment, operated as a separate service under a separate licence – and subscribers to one of the two services did not necessarily have to subscribe to the other. However, Encore Avenue was very frequently sold together in a package with Movie Central.

Channel	Description and programming
Movie Central	The main "flagship" channel; Movie Central offered films (all genres), documentaries and television series, including content from the American pay service Showtime, along with Canadian programming.
Movie Central 2	This channel carried films and television series with a focus on action, thriller, horror and comedy genres.
Movie Central 3	This channel carried films and television series with a focus on drama and romance, including independent and foreign films.
HBO Canada	HBO Canada, to which Corus owned the territorial distribution rights for Western Canada, featured primarily original programming sourced from American premium service HBO.

=== HBO Canada ===
Logo of HBO Canada.

On September 22, 2008, both The Movie Network and Movie Central announced that the two channels would jointly begin offering a dedicated HBO multiplex channel (in both standard definition and high-definition formats), called HBO Canada, on October 30. For Movie Central subscribers, HBO Canada replaced Movie Central 4. For TMN subscribers, HBO Canada replaced MMore and MMore HD. The channel remains available at no additional charge to TMN and Movie Central subscribers and, moreover, is not available on a standalone basis.

The channel focuses on programming from the U.S. premium service HBO, including several HBO series, specials and sporting events not previously available in Canada; however, some programs that have aired on HBO Canada have aired in the United States on HBO's competitor Showtime. A selection of Canadian films and series also airs to satisfy Canadian content requirements. HBO programming now airs solely on HBO Canada, as opposed to any of the other TMN/Movie Central multiplex channels.

The HBO Canada schedule was common to both services, with the exception of timeshifting for the Eastern (TMN) and Mountain (MC) time zones. Although, when it launched, essentially operating as a joint venture of Corus and TMN's parent company Bell Media, the east and west feeds are technically separate channels wholly owned by the parent company of the applicable regional service. In any event, HBO's parent company Time Warner is not a shareholder, and only licenses the name, logo and programming to Corus and Bell. Unlike the other multiplex channels offered by Movie Central and The Movie Network, both the standard-definition and high-definition HBO Canada feeds (East/West) are available nationally to those television providers who wish to carry them. The Movie Network's master control acts as the hub for HBO Canada.

=== Other services ===
==== Movie Central HD ====
Movie Central HD was a high definition simulcast feed of Movie Central that broadcast in the 1080i resolution format. In addition to its main channel, Movie Central also operated high definition simulcast feeds of its two Movie Central-branded multiplex channels and HBO Canada. In December 2004, Movie Central launched its first high definition channel called Movie Central HD, which delivered simulcasted content from Movie Central's various multiplex channels, excluding Encore Avenue and Encore Avenue 2. In 2006, Movie Central launched its second HD simulcast feed, Movie Central 2 HD, which delivered an alternative schedule of HD content from Movie Central HD. In March 2012, Movie Central launched Movie Central 3 HD, a high-definition simulcast of its third multiplex channel.

==== Movie Central On Demand ====
Movie Central operated a subscription video-on-demand television service called Movie Central On Demand, which is available at no additional charge to new and existing subscribers of Movie Central. Content featured on the service included films and television series from Movie Central and its four multiplex channels, excluding the two Encore Avenue channels. HBO Canada operated as a separate SVOD service, HBO Canada On Demand, providing feature films along with series content from American premium service HBO; it was available to subscribers of Movie Central on most providers at no additional cost. Movie Central On Demand's rotating program selection incorporates select new titles that were added each Friday, alongside existing program titles held over from the previous one to two weeks.

==== TV Everywhere ====
Movie Central did not have a cross-provider TV Everywhere service for online and mobile streaming similar to HBO GO or TMN GO. However, selected service providers offered this content through their own apps: Shaw offered a dedicated "Shaw Go – Movie Central" app for this purpose, while Bell Satellite TV and Telus Optik TV made Movie Central content available through their respective omnibus TV Everywhere apps.

== Programming ==
Movie Central offered an extensive variety of first-run films and television series, most of which come from the American premium television services HBO, Cinemax and Showtime, as well as critically acclaimed original Canadian series, most of which were co-produced in partnership with The Movie Network. A selected time block on the channel called Metro, aired independent, short, festival, foreign, and subtitled films, documentaries and original programming.

Films typically debuted on Movie Central within a lag of between 10 and 12 months on average from their initial theatrical release, three to six months after their initial release on pay-per-view services and over 1½ years before their network television or basic cable debuts. Sports coverage was permitted, but in such limited amounts that it is rarely seen, in contrast to HBO and Showtime.

=== List of programs broadcast by Movie Central and HBO Canada ===
==== Original programming ====
- Call Me Fitz
- Less Than Kind
- Transporter
- Rogue
- Funny as Hell
- Sensitive Skin
- Reelside

==== Acquired programming ====
- Game of Thrones
- True Blood
- Boardwalk Empire
- Masters of Sex
- Shameless
- House of Lies
- Episodes
- Californication
- Nurse Jackie
- Ray Donovan
- Banshee
- Veep
- Girls
- Strike Back

== Duopoly issue ==
For many years, the de facto twin regional monopolies of The Movie Network and Movie Central had been criticized. At the time, no other similar premium services had broadcast within Canada. Critics argued that this limited competition and consumer choice, while proponents said that there was very little in content or functionality that was not already offered by the existing services.

In July 2005, the CRTC, the Canadian federal broadcast regulator, announced that public hearings would begin on October 24 of that year on four applications for new national pay television licences from different groups. Each applicant claimed that they would commit to invest and develop more Canadian-produced programming content. On May 18, 2006, the CRTC announced that had accepted an application by Allarco Entertainment, while the other three were rejected. This approved application effectively ended The Movie Network/Movie Central duopoly in Canada. On November 2, 2007, the new service was launched as Super Channel.

With approval for The Movie Network (now known as Crave) to go national and the discontinuation of the Movie Central service, Canada now has two full-time national premium movie services.
