= Reelside =

- Country of origin: Canada

Original release
- Network: The Movie Network
- Release: June 4, 2015

Reelside is a 2015 Canadian documentary television series about the creative process of Canadian filmmakers that premiered on The Movie Network on June 4, 2015.

Reelside's first season features Sarah Gadon, Caitlin Cronenberg, George A. Romero, Seth Rogen, Evan Goldberg, Matthew Bass, Vincenzo Natali, Michael Hogan, Graeme Manson, Don McKellar, Bruce McDonald, Matthew Hannam, Stephen Amell, David Hayter, and Lloyd Kaufman. Reelside is produced by Fifth Ground Entertainment.

Reelside marks the directorial debut of actress/model Sarah Gadon with her episode featuring her own creative relationship with photographer and frequent collaborator, Caitlin Cronenberg.

== Accolades ==
Reelside has been nominated for two 2016 Canadian Screen Awards including Best Biography or Arts Documentary Program or Series and Best Direction in a Documentary or Factual Series for "Superheroes".
