= Novus Entertainment =

Canadian telecommunications company

Novus Entertainment Inc.
- Type: Private
- Industry: Telecommunications
- Founded: 1996
- Headquarters: Vancouver, British Columbia, Canada
- Key people: Donna L. Robertson; (Co-President, CLO); Chris Marett; (Co-President, CFO)
- Products: Cable television; Broadband Internet access; Telephony
- Owner: Privately Held
- ASN: 40029
- Website: www.novusnow.ca

Novus Entertainment (commonly known simply as Novus) is a Canadian telecommunications company providing television, digital phone, and high-speed Internet services via a fibre-optic network. The company is licensed by the Canadian Radio-Television and Telecommunications Commission (the CRTC) as a Class 1 Broadcast Distribution Undertaking for both Metro Vancouver. Novus presently provides services to apartments, condominiums, and businesses in Metro Vancouver. Novus is one of the few broadband Internet carriers in Canada to offer a fibre-to-the-Building (FTTB) network. The company continues to expand its service in Metro Vancouver.

Novus is also in the business of leasing dark fibre to other communications service providers and to businesses.

== Novus TV ==
Novus TV is a locally based community channel operated by Novus Entertainment Inc.

Novus TV covers a variety of events and issues happening in and around Vancouver and the lower mainland and airs numerous locally produced shows, short films, music videos, etc. created by community members.

== See also ==
- fibre-optic communication
