= Crave (TV network) =

Canadian premium TV network

- Country: Canada
- Broadcast area: Nationwide
- Headquarters: Toronto, Ontario

Programming
- Language: English
- Picture format: 1080i HDTV wireline (SDTV version letterboxed 480i downscaled)

Ownership
- Owner: Astral Media (1993–2013); Bell Media (2013–present)
- Sister channels: HBO; Starz; Super Écran; Cinépop

History
- Launched: February 1, 1983; 43 years ago
- Replaced: Movie Central (in Western/Northern Canada, as of March 1, 2016)
- Former names: First Choice (1983–1984, 1989–1993); First Choice Superchannel (1984–1989); The Movie Network (1993–2018)

Links
- Website: crave.ca

Crave (formerly The Movie Network or TMN) is a Canadian premium television network and streaming service owned by the Bell Media subsidiary of BCE Inc.. It is the linear television component of the Crave streaming service, but for regulatory purposes, the streaming service and specialty television service are considered to be separate operations.

Launched in 1983 as the national service First Choice, early difficulties and a subsequent industry restructuring led to its operations being restricted to Eastern Canada from 1984 to 2016; it then held a regional legal monopoly on movie-based premium TV services in its territory until the launch of the present-day Super Channel in 2007. The service changed its name to The Movie Network in 1993. In 2016, when Movie Central (which previously held a similar monopoly in Western and Northern Canada) wound down its operations, TMN resumed national operations and subsumed the former service's subscribers.

In 2018, TMN merged its operations with the over-the-top (OTT) streaming service CraveTV; both services would be rebranded as Crave. With these changes, the streaming service added a premium tier, "Movies + HBO", which includes access to the premium content that was previously exclusive to the TMN and its Canadian HBO multiplex. Likewise, the television version of the service distributed by providers featured access to the on-demand library of the former CraveTV service as part of their subscription. As such, the service was often sold by providers under the name Crave + Movies + HBO, until programming from both tiers was collapsed into a single library in October 2021. Since then, the Crave service sold by TV service providers has been equivalent to the Crave Total (now Crave Premium) ad-free OTT plan.

== History ==
=== Development ===
First Choice logo, used from 1983 to 1984 and 1989 to 1992. From 1984 to 1989, the service used a variant of Superchannel's star logo.

Logo used in January 1993 as the service transitioned to using The Movie Network as its primary name. This logo was short-lived; by early 1994 it had been replaced with the first in a succession of "TMN" logos used until 2004.

In 1976, Communications Minister Jeanne Sauvé was quoted as saying "(Canadian) pay television is inevitable". During the 1970s when premium television service HBO and the then up-and-coming Atlanta, Georgia superstation WTBS (now WPCH-TV) became available via satellite in North America, some Canadians who were living in underserved rural areas, wanted access to these services. The Saskatchewan government together with Cable Regina (later Access Communications) set up a provincial pay television network called Teletheatre in 1979.

Growth of grey market television receive-only dishes by 1980 led the Canadian government under the administration of Pierre Trudeau to allow for pay television in Canada, and that there would be hearings to license pay television networks in Canada. In September 1981, the Canadian Radio-television and Telecommunications Commission (CRTC) held a hearing in Hull, Quebec to license Canada's first pay television networks. There were more than 24 applicants to start such services.

When First Choice Canadian Communications Corp. made its application to the CRTC in September 1981, the individuals and companies involved in the proposed channel included Donald Sobey (of the Sobeys supermarket chain), J. R. McCaig, Norman Keevil, television producer Riff Markowitz, Royfund Equity Ltd. (a mutual fund division of the Royal Bank of Canada), AGF Management Ltd. and Manufacturers Life Insurance Co. Together, they had $19 million in equity financing and proposed to spend $310.4 million over five years on Canadian television production. Estimated profit (over five years) would be $3.1 million. A pay television licence was issued by the CRTC to First Choice on March 18, 1982. The channel's first president was Donald MacPherson.

At the time that First Choice applied to the CRTC, it estimated that to program major American movies, entertainment specials and Canadian movies and specials, pay for satellite time, and marketing of the channel, it could sell it to the cable companies at a wholesale rate of $7.50 each month. However, by the time the channel launched, and providers received their revenue from the pay television services, the retail cost of First Choice jumped significantly to $15.95 (equivalent to $45.08 in 2025).

=== Launch and evolution ===
When First Choice was launched on February 1, 1983, it operated as a national premium service; the network's original slogan was "Look Out for Number One! Look Out for First Choice!" The network inaugurated programming with a two-hour promotional reel announcing the programming that First Choice would carry, followed by a replay of The Who's farewell tour concert special; the airing of The Who concert which had been aired live on other channels in Canada the year before, as well as the two-hour promotional ad had several critics wondering about the channel's claims that it would be commercial-free and not play reruns. These programs were followed by the first movie ever to be broadcast on First Choice, For Your Eyes Only.

At 10 a.m. Eastern/7 a.m. Pacific Time that day, First Choice aired Star Wars and continued to replay the film every other day for eight hours. The channel offered its programming for free for 14 days starting with the channel's first day of operation, before it was scrambled, except to those subscribers who wanted to pay the extra fee to continue receiving the channel. Before the advent of stereo television and home theatre systems, subscribers who paid for cable FM service could receive a stereo feed of First Choice. During its first year, First Choice aired a two-hour block of programming from the American adult-oriented pay service The Playboy Channel (now Playboy TV) as part of a late night programming block on Fridays.

The "TMN" logo (seen here in black-and-white but normally rendered in a dark red on-air), as it was used from Spring 1996 until 2001.

After a disappointing run for pay services in general, the industry was restructured in late 1983 and into 1984, and First Choice's service area was restricted to Canadian provinces east of the Ontario-Manitoba border, with competitor Superchannel (later Movie Central) taking territorial rights to the west of that border. As part of this restructuring, film production company Astral Bellevue Pathé (later known as Astral Communications, then Astral Media) took a controlling interest in First Choice, and its principal owner Harold Greenberg became the channel's new president; Astral became sole owner by 1993.

The two regional services used the First Choice-Superchannel name from 1984 to 1988, before they were split again in September 1988. Beginning in 1984 (but particularly after the split from Superchannel), First Choice also made use of the slogan "The Movie Network"; this became the name of the channel itself in 1993.

First Choice was originally granted a bilingual licence; it also operated a 24-hour French-language channel under the same licence, which was called Premier Choix. In early 1984, that service was merged with another Quebec-based pay-television network, TVEC, to form Super Écran, which continues to exist today. On October 1, 1994, The Movie Network launched a companion film service, TMN Moviepix (the channel would undergo two renamings – first to Moviepix in 1996 and then Mpix in 2001 – before eventually becoming The Movie Network Encore on September 18, 2012).

On July 5, 2013, Astral Media was acquired by Bell Media.

=== End of duopoly, further developments ===
Final logo as The Movie Network

For many years, the de facto twin regional monopolies of The Movie Network and Movie Central had been criticized. At the time, no other similar premium services had broadcast within Canada. Critics argued that this limited competition and consumer choice, while proponents said that there was very little in content or functionality that was not already offered by the existing services. In July 2005, the CRTC, the Canadian federal broadcast regulator, announced that public hearings would begin on October 24 of that year on four applications for new national pay television licences from different groups. Each applicant claimed that they would commit to invest and develop more Canadian-produced programming content. On May 18, 2006, the CRTC announced that had accepted an application by Allarco Entertainment, while the other three were rejected. This approved application effectively ended The Movie Network/Movie Central duopoly in Canada. On November 2, 2007, the new service was launched as Super Channel.

On November 19, 2015, Movie Central owner Corus Entertainment announced that as a result of a strategic review, it had decided to exit the pay TV business to concentrate on its national specialty channels, and would discontinue Movie Central along with Encore Avenue. To that end, Corus reached an agreement with Bell through which TMN became a national service once again on March 1, 2016, with Movie Central customers automatically transitioning to TMN. TMN Encore also expanded nationally for the first time, and Bell took over full operation of HBO Canada (previously a jointly-operated multiplex channel of both TMN and Movie Central). Although Bell did not buy the Movie Central licence, it paid Corus C$211 million in exchange for Corus' assistance in allowing TMN's national expansion. The CRTC had quietly given administrative approval (i.e., approved without a request for public comment) to applications to allow TMN and TMN Encore to operate nationally in July 2015, so no further regulatory approval was required. This meant that Bell was not required to fund a public benefits package worth 10% of the transaction value, as would typically be required by the CRTC in the event of a licence transfer.

On January 23, 2018, Bell Media announced that it had reached new licensing deals with Lionsgate and subsidiary company Starz Inc., under which the former held Canadian pay television window rights to the latter's releases and TMN Encore was rebranded as a Canadian Starz channel in 2019.

=== Merger with CraveTV, relaunch as a hybrid VOD service ===
In October 2018, a Rogers Cable service bulletin stated that beginning in November, The Movie Network subscribers would begin to receive Bell's over-the-top subscription service CraveTV as part of their service.

On November 1, 2018, Bell announced that CraveTV had merged with The Movie Network, with both services renamed Crave (and promotions marketing the relaunch as "The All-New Crave"). Under the service's new structure, subscribers to the existing CraveTV OTT service may upgrade their subscription to a $19.98 "Crave + Movies + HBO" tier, that adds the content formerly associated with TMN (including films and current HBO series). This marks the first time that the service formerly known as The Movie Network has been offered on a standalone basis without a television subscription. Existing TMN television subscribers are also able to access the content library of the base Crave service as part of their subscription, which includes various television series as well as new and existing Showtime programming. The original OTT-only service without films or current HBO programming remained available at its existing $9.99 price. Bell Media head Randy Lennox cited increasing competition with Netflix as a basis for the decision.

In 2021, Crave realigned its plans to be based on device support and concurrent streams rather than libraries, with the $9.99 service becoming "Crave Basic" and only offering one stream on a mobile device or web browser (but with access to the Movies + HBO content library), and the "Crave Total" tier offering up to four streams, and support for apps on connected devices.

== Channels ==
The area shaded in green is the broadcast area for Crave's "east" feeds; the remainder of Canada receives "west" feeds. (During the regional monopoly days, the then The Movie Network only broadcast in the green area, with Movie Central broadcasting on the white area.)

=== List of channels ===
Depending on the service provider, Crave provides up to six 24-hour multiplex channels (all simulcast in both standard definition and high definition) as well as a subscription video-on-demand service.

Crave broadcasts its primary channels (Crave 1, Crave 2, Crave 3, and HBO 1) on an Eastern Time Zone schedule for all viewers east of the Ontario–Manitoba border, and for all viewers regardless of region accessing the linear streams via Crave's streaming platform. Traditional TV service customers west of that border receive programming on a Mountain Time Zone schedule, being a holdover from Movie Central's scheduling practices due to its origins as an Alberta-based service also serving the Central and Pacific time zones. After replacing Movie Central in Western and Northern Canada, TMN reverted to a numbering system for its channels similar to most other premium services, after several years of using theme-based branding for its channels. These numbers are currently used within program guides and promotional material; the numbers are not used in on-air branding.

Bell's other English-language pay TV service Starz operates under a separate licence, and subscribers to one of the two services do not necessarily have to subscribe to the other. However, some service providers require customers that subscribe to the Crave linear service to also subscribe to Starz.

Channel	Description and programming
Crave 1	The main "flagship" channel, including the premiere showings of most films, documentaries and television series (excluding mainline HBO programming), along with Canadian programming. The opposite-region feed of Crave 1 (i.e., the Mountain Time feed in eastern Canada, and the Eastern Time feed in western Canada) is also available through many service providers, branded as Crave 4. For subscribers in eastern Canada, this replaced MFest, which was focused on independent and foreign films, in March 2016.
Crave 2	Various programming. Prior to March 2016, this channel was known as MFun! and focused on comedic and light-hearted films, specials and series.
Crave 3	Various programming. At some point in 2025, this channel became a three-hour timeshift channel of Crave 2; however, unlike Crave 1 and 4, there are still separate West feeds for both Crave 2 and 3 (each on a two-hour delay from the respective East feeds). Prior to March 2016, this channel was known as MExcess and focused on action-oriented movies, plus late night pornographic content. During Crave's time as Showtime's Canadian rightsholder, Crave 3 also had the first airings of selected Showtime programs conflicting with Crave's traditional weekend movie premieres.
HBO	This channel offers original programming sourced mainly from American premium service HBO and sibling streaming platform HBO Max. Some providers offer both the East and West feeds, with the in-region feed listed on Crave's website and most EPGs as HBO 1 and the opposite-region feed as HBO 2.

=== HBO multiplex channel ===
On September 22, 2008, both TMN and Movie Central announced that the two services would jointly begin offering a dedicated HBO multiplex channel (available in both standard definition and high definition), initially called "HBO Canada", on October 30. For TMN subscribers, HBO Canada replaced MMore and MMore HD. For Movie Central subscribers, HBO Canada replaced Movie Central 4. TMN ultimately assumed sole responsibility for the channel after replacing Movie Central in its service area. The channel, which was rebranded to simply "HBO" in June 2019, is available at no additional charge to TMN/Crave linear subscribers and, moreover, is not available on a standalone basis except on MTS TV.

Former logo of HBO Canada

The Canadian HBO channel focuses on programming from the U.S. premium service HBO and its sister network Cinemax, including several original series from the two channels, specials, and sporting events not previously available in Canada. A selection of Canadian films and series also airs to satisfy Canadian content requirements. HBO programming has since aired solely on this channel, as opposed to any of the other TMN multiplex channels. Since December 2022, the channel now airs more American and international films, starting with Sing 2.

Under the previous TMN / Movie Central system, HBO Canada was unique in that its schedule was common to both services, with the exception of timeshifting for the Eastern (TMN) and Mountain (MC) time zones. Although essentially operating as a joint venture of Bell and Movie Central's parent company Corus Entertainment, the east and west feeds were technically separate channels wholly owned by the parent company of the applicable regional service. In any event, HBO's parent company Warner Bros. Discovery is not (and continues to not be) a shareholder, and only licenses the name, logo and programming to Bell.

=== Other services ===
==== High definition ====
TMN launched its 1080i high definition feed in May 2005. HBO Canada began broadcasting in high definition on October 30, 2008, becoming the first TMN multiplex channel to launch its own HD simulcast feeds; followed by MFun and MExcess in 2010. The remaining TMN multiplex channel, MFest, launched its HD simulcast feed on September 18, 2012.

==== Video on-demand ====
On most service providers, subscribers are also able to access the Crave pay TV service's programming on a video on demand service/folder now generally labelled "Crave + Movies + HBO", which includes feature films, television series from Crave and outside distributors, and specials. From 2008 to 2018, HBO programming was carried in a separate HBO Canada on-demand folder; this was removed with the changeover to Crave.

If the base-level Crave VOD service is also available through set-top boxes on that provider, subscribers to the pay service are also able to access this content, usually in a separate "Crave" folder.

==== TV Everywhere ====
On February 27, 2013, The Movie Network launched The Movie Network Go (TMN Go), a TV Everywhere website and mobile app which features streaming content from the TMN service. With the rebranding as Crave, TMN Go was replaced by the Crave website and apps on mobile and digital media players, which offers similar functionality.

==== Movie Entertainment ====
Movie Entertainment (or ME), previously titled Feature, served as Crave's monthly in-house magazine for linear TV subscribers from June 1990 to April 2021, and was published by Astral (later Bell) subsidiary Feature Publishing. Prior to 1990, subscribers received PrimeTime magazine, a similar publication originated by Superchannel (later Movie Central).

The magazine contained monthly listings for the Crave, HBO, and Starz linear channels, as well as various other features related to that month's Crave programming and the entertainment industry in general. A subscription to Movie Entertainment was included by default when subscribing to the Crave linear service through some TV service providers, though by the early 2000s, subscribers were able to opt out, in some cases resulting in a monthly savings of C$2, by contacting their provider. Conversely, other service providers (including Shaw Direct) began to require subscribers to opt-in (for the same $2 charge) if they wished to receive the magazine. ME was also available for direct subscription by contacting Crave.

The magazine ceased publication after the April 2021 issue. An editor's note in the penultimate issue cited changes in home media consumption meaning the magazine was no longer necessary. The closure also came shortly after the announcement of other cost-cutting measures, including layoffs, throughout Bell Media.

Crave previously aired a segment of movie reviews called Movie Entertainment, which also aired on former sister channels Family Channel and Disney XD. This segment was discontinued in 2014, upon Steve Gow's departure from The Movie Network.

== Programming ==
Programming on Crave's linear service includes theatrically released motion pictures, original and foreign television series, made-for-cable movies, documentaries, and stand-up comedy and concert specials. Before other Canadian specialty networks like TSN and Much were licensed, First Choice prominently offered commercial-free professional sporting and concert events. Sports events featured on the channel came from such distributors as ESPN, USA Network and HBO.

=== Relationship with HBO and Showtime ===
Along with French-language sister service Super Écran, Crave owns exclusive Canadian rights to most original programming from HBO (featured on a dedicated HBO multiplex channel within the Crave service), sibling service Cinemax, and rival service Showtime.

Prior to its merger with CraveTV, The Movie Network held exclusive rights to new seasons of HBO programming, which are now included in Crave's premium tier, while CraveTV held streaming rights to past seasons of several Showtime series. First-run Showtime programming and library HBO programming (as well as past seasons of select current HBO series, such as Game of Thrones), were available on both services.

In-spite of this, the rights certain programs commissioned from outside production companies, which have retained international distribution rights, have previously been sold to other Canadian channels. For example, the Showtime series Homeland was not initially covered under Crave's output deal; producing studio Fox 21 Television Studios (now 20th Television) had sold the Canadian first-run rights to Super Channel when the series premiered. Crave would later acquire non-exclusive rights to re-air and stream past seasons of Homeland through a separate deal with Fox/Disney and the channel ultimately acquired the premiere rights for the 8th and final season of the series airing in 2020.

Conversely, while Crave held first-run rights to the Warner Bros.-produced Showtime series Shameless, its rights are more limited than for series produced by Showtime directly – only the most recent season is available, and unlike other Showtime series it is not available in Crave's base streaming/VOD tier. Previous season rights to the show were held in Canada by FXX and Netflix.

=== Movie library ===
As of 2021, Crave has first-run film licensing agreements with the Canadian film distributor Entertainment One (whose library includes the Canadian distribution rights to titles from The Weinstein Company and Lionsgate). Other American film studios providing content to the service include Universal Pictures (including Universal Animation Studios, Working Title Films, Illumination Entertainment, Focus Features, DreamWorks Animation and Legendary Pictures), and Warner Bros. (including Warner Bros. Animation, New Line Cinema—whose 1989–2010 film library is distributed in Canada by Entertainment One—Alcon Entertainment and Castle Rock Entertainment).

Crave also had a deal with Walt Disney Studios Motion Pictures giving it rights to all Disney titles (including those under the Disney, Pixar Animation Studios, Walt Disney Animation Studios, Disneynature, Marvel Studios/Entertainment, Disneytoon Studios and Touchstone Pictures brands, but not Lucasfilm since Disney's first movie from them, Strange Magic, was released in 2015 after TMN lost the rights to broadcast Disney movies) released theatrically through December 31, 2014, some of which continued to air on TMN into 2016. The equivalent rights for Disney movies released theatrically starting in 2015 were instead held by Netflix Canada from 2015 to 2018, and are now held by Disney+ in Canada since 2019. They were entirely replaced by 20th Century Fox (now 20th Century Studios) films; 20th Century Fox would eventually come under Disney's ownership, but Fox movies are still coming to Crave even after they were purchased by Disney and were renamed to its current moniker, though this content agreement may expire in the future. Two of Touchstone's titles, The Tempest and Gnomeo & Juliet, are distributed in Canada by Entertainment One. The distribution rights to three of Marvel Studios' films, The Incredible Hulk, Spider-Man: Homecoming and Spider-Man: Far From Home (the later two, of which, Columbia Pictures co-produced) are owned by Universal and Sony respectively. Since 2021, Crave also shares 20th Century Studios films with Disney+, starting with Nomadland.

After briefly losing rights to Amazon Prime Video in 2020, in December 2022, Sony Pictures signed a new agreement with Crave beginning in April 2023—which includes first window rights to theatrical releases, and rights to back catalogue titles.

=== Original programming ===
Original programming produced under the Movie Network branding included:

- Bloodletting and Miraculous Cures
- The Business
- Durham County
- G-Spot
- Less Than Kind
- The Line
- Living in Your Car
- Reelside
- ReGenesis
- Sensitive Skin
- Terminal City
- ZOS: Zone of Separation

After rebranding as Crave in 2018, the service initially scaled back on the development of ongoing television series; apart from the reality show Canada's Drag Race and the comedy series Letterkenny and New Eden, most titles branded as "Crave Originals" in the next few years were documentary films or stand-up comedy specials recorded at the Just for Laughs festival.

The service began to shift back toward series development again in 2021, with original series including 1 Queen 5 Queers, Bria Mack Gets a Life, Little Bird, Pillow Talk, Shoresy, Thunder Bay, Late Bloomer, Cocaine, Prison & Likes: Isabelle's True Story and We're All Gonna Die (Even Jay Baruchel).
