= Super Écran =

Canadian French-language premium TV network

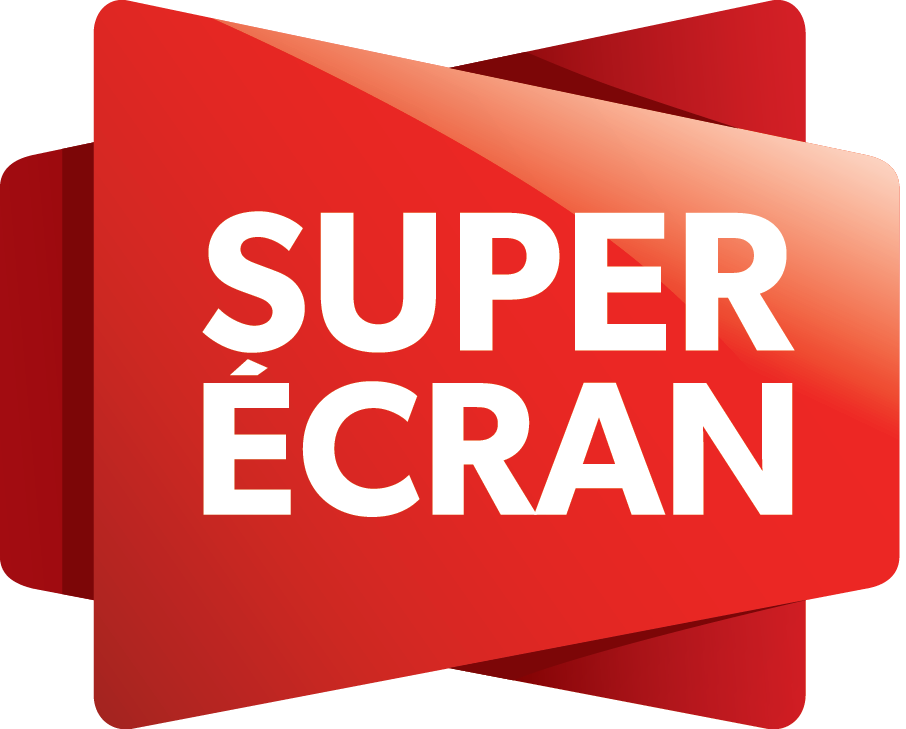
- Country: Canada
- Broadcast area: Nationwide
- Headquarters: Montreal, Quebec

Programming
- Language: French
- Picture format: 1080i HDTV (downscaled to letterboxed 480i for the SDTV feed)

Ownership
- Owner: Astral Media (1983–2013); Bell Media (2013–present)
- Sister channels: Crave; HBO; Starz; Cinépop

History
- Launched: February 1, 1983; 43 years ago
- Former names: Premier Choix; Premier Choix: TVEC

Links
- Website: crave.ca/en/super-ecran

Availability

Streaming media
- Crave: Over-the-top TV

Super Écran (French: Super Screen) is a Canadian French-language premium television network owned by Bell Media. It airs a mix of commercial-free films and television series. Films are primarily sourced from the United States and Canada, while the television series mostly consist of original series and programs from HBO and Showtime in the United States.

== History ==
Launched on February 1, 1983 under the name Premier Choix (French: First Choice), the channel was licensed by the Canadian Radio-television and Telecommunications Commission (CRTC) to provide a national 24-hour-a-day French-language pay television network. It was owned and operated by First Choice Canadian Communications.

Premier Choix had a difficult time attracting enough subscribers, as did a regional Quebec-based pay-television network called TVEC which was licensed in November 1982. Rogers Cable in Toronto couldn't add the channel until September 1983, and Videon Cable in Winnipeg didn't have the additional channel capacity to add it until its dispute with Manitoba Telecom Services (MTS) over ownership of the cable plant was settled.

In the early years, before Réseau des sports and MusiquePlus were licensed, programming consisted of 70% movies and 30% sports.

TVEC (Télévision de l'Est du Canada Inc. (French: Eastern Canada Television Inc.)) was licensed in November 1982 as a regional French-language pay-TV channel from Quebec, serving Quebec, eastern Ontario, and Atlantic Canada (New Brunswick).

In February 1984 these two channels combined to form Super Écran.

In the late 1980s, Premier Choix: TVEC was awarded licenses for three additional specialty services, including Canal D and Le Canal Famille.

The network was granted authorization for national distribution across Canada in 1996.

On October 30, 2006, Astral Media launched an HD simulcast of Super Écran. Later, Astral launched HD feeds for all three remaining channels.

On March 4, 2013, the Competition Bureau approved the takeover of Astral Media by Bell Media. Bell filed a new application for the proposed takeover with the CRTC on March 6, 2013; the CRTC approved the merger on June 27, 2013.

On January 21, 2020, Bell announced that it would expand its subscription streaming service Crave into the French-language market on January 28, adding a selection of French-language content for all subscribers, as well as a premium Super Écran tier (equivalent to the "Crave + Movies + HBO" tier tied to Crave's English-language linear service, formerly known as The Movie Network). With the changes, the Super Écran Go apps were discontinued, with subscribers being directed to the Crave app for TV Everywhere video on-demand access.

== Multiplexes and programming ==
Super Écran offers an extensive variety of Hollywood and Canadian movies, television series from HBO, Showtime and others distributors, and original content. Super Écran operates four multiplex channels, numbered from 1 to 4 in standard and high-definition. A video on demand service, "Super Écran Sur Demande", was offered for digital cable and satellite subscribers, and "Super Écran Go", a TV Everywhere platform for mobile and TV streaming set-top box, both featuring programming from the Super Écran channels. Go ceased operations on January 28, 2020, with their programming moving to the Crave platform while Sur Demande was only removed for Videotron Subscribers.

== International distribution ==
- Saint Pierre and Miquelon - distributed on SPM Telecom systems.
