= Starz (Canada) =

Canadian pay television network

- Logo used since 2022
- Country: Canada
- Broadcast area: Nationwide
- Headquarters: Toronto, Ontario

Programming
- Language: English
- Picture format: 1080i (HDTV); 480i (SDTV)

Ownership
- Owner: Astral Media (1994–2013); Bell Media (2013–present) (branding licensed from Starz Inc.)
- Sister channels: Crave; Super Écran

History
- Launched: October 1, 1994, 29 years ago
- Replaced: Encore Avenue (Western Canada; 2016)
- Former names: TMN Moviepix (1994–1996); Moviepix (1996–2003); Mpix (2003–2012); The Movie Network Encore (2012–2019)

Links
- Website: starz.ca

Availability

Streaming media
- Amazon Prime Channels: Over-the-top TV
- Apple TV Channels: Over-the-top TV
- Crave: Over-the-top TV

Starz is a Canadian English language premium television network owned by Bell Media under license from Starz Inc. and launched on October 1, 1994.

Originally launched by Astral Media as TMN Moviepix, a sister service to The Movie Network (now the Crave pay TV network) carrying classic films; it carried this format under various names including Mpix and The Movie Network Encore. Five years after Astral was acquired by Bell Media, the latter struck a partnership with Starz Entertainment (at the time known as Lionsgate) to rebrand the network as the local equivalent of the eponymous American pay television channel in March 2019 and broadcast its select original programming.

Starz is carried by various Canadian cable and satellite television providers, including Bell Satellite TV, Shaw Direct, Rogers Cable, Vidéotron, EastLink, Shaw, Telus and Cogeco; since the 2019 relaunch it has also been available on a direct-to-consumer basis as an addon to the Crave streaming service, as well as through Amazon Prime Video Channels and Apple TV Channels. Similarly to TMN/Crave, TMN Encore operated only in provinces east of the Ontario-Manitoba border until 2016, with Western Canada served by a similar service run by Movie Central known as Encore Avenue. With the shutdown of both services in 2016, Encore/Starz has since served the entirety of Canada.

== History ==
The channel was launched on October 1, 1994 as TMN Moviepix; by 1996, its name was shortened to simply Moviepix. Sometime in 2003, the channel's name was shortened for the third time to simply Mpix. The channel was originally owned by Astral Communications (later Astral Media).

In an effort to re-align Mpix with The Movie Network brand, on August 20, 2012, Astral announced that it would be rebranding Mpix as The Movie Network Encore, or TMN Encore, on September 18, 2012. On the day of the rebrand, its multiplex channel MorePix was accordingly renamed TMN Encore 2; with the change, TMN Encore 2 also launched a high definition feed, which simulcasts its standard definition counterpart.

TMN Encore was also the only private broadcaster financing film preservation in Canada through its sponsorship of the Audio-Visual Preservation Trust of Canada (now defunct), and National Archives.

On March 4, 2013, the Competition Bureau approved the takeover of Astral Media by Bell Media. Bell filed a new application for the proposed takeover with the CRTC on March 6, 2013; the CRTC approved the merger on June 27, 2013, and was completed on July 5 of that year.

On November 19, 2015, Corus Entertainment announced that as a result of a strategic review, it had decided to exit the pay-television industry in order to concentrate on its national specialty channels more, and announced that it would shut down Encore Avenue and Movie Central (which held a monopoly position in Western Canada, while TMN held a monopoly in the East), and work with Bell to transition existing subscribers to TMN Encore and The Movie Network respectively. The CRTC had quietly removed the regional restrictions from both services' licences earlier in the year.

On January 23, 2018, Bell Media announced that it had reached licensing agreements with Starz Inc. and Lionsgate, and that TMN Encore would be rebranded under the Starz brand in 2019, featuring its programming. Following TMN's rebranding as Crave on November 1, 2018, the channel rebranded as just Encore (coincidentally, the original name of Starz's sister network, Starz Encore), while keeping the same logo, as an interim name until the rebrand to Starz took place.

On February 7, 2019, Bell announced that Encore would be rebranded as "Starz", which was effective March 1. Shortly thereafter, Starz also became available on a direct-to-consumer basis as an add-on to the Crave streaming service, being priced at $5.99 per month.

== Distribution ==
Starz operates as a separate service from Bell Media's other premium TV service Crave (formerly The Movie Network) and under a separate licence, though they shared consistent branding until November 2018. Subscribers to one of the two services through a traditional TV service provider do not necessarily have to subscribe to the other; however, Crave (as TMN) was very frequently sold together in a package with Encore, and some providers continue to offer Crave and Starz only as part of a combined package.

The service is also available on a direct-to-consumer basis (currently for $5.99 per month) through the following methods:

- through the Crave OTT streaming platform (requires a subscription to the base Crave service);
- through Amazon's Prime Video Channels marketplace (requires a subscription to Amazon Prime); and
- through Apple TV Channels (only supported through the Apple TV app, which is available on Apple products and some non-Apple devices, but does not require a subscription to another service such as Apple TV+).

== Channels ==
=== List of channels ===
On most service providers, Starz provides two 24-hour multiplex channels, both of which are simulcast in both standard definition and high definition – as well as a subscription video-on-demand service (Starz on Demand).

Starz broadcasts its primary and multiplex channels on both Eastern Time Zone and Mountain Time Zone schedules, for viewers east or west of the Ontario-Manitoba border respectively. Viewers of the linear Starz channels via over-the-top streaming platforms can only access the Eastern Time feeds.

Channel	Description and programming
Starz 1	The flagship channel; Starz 1 carries films from the 1970s to the 2000s, including blockbuster and critically acclaimed imported and domestic films, as well as select original programming from Starz. This channel was formerly known as MoviePix from 1994 to 2003; Mpix from 2003 to 2012; TMN Encore from 2012 to 2018; and Encore 1 from 2018 to 2019.
Starz 2	Starz 2 is a secondary channel that provides additional movie choices, which is counterprogrammed with Encore; this channel was originally known as MoviePix 2 from 1996 to 2003, and was later renamed Mpix 2 from 2003 to 2004; MEscape from 2004 to March 31, 2008; MorePix from April 1, 2008, to September 23, 2012; TMN Encore 2 until November 1, 2018; and Encore 2 until March 1, 2019.

==== Background ====
For a time, Mpix was focused on classic thriller, suspense and action films, while MorePix focused on classic dramas and light-hearted movies. This distinction no longer seems to be in place and both channels now carry a variety of films from various genres and eras, though Starz 2 is more likely to carry older and/or less commercially successful films.

=== Related services ===
==== High-definition simulcasts ====
The high definition simulcast feeds of the Starz channels broadcast in the 1080i resolution format.

Mpix / Encore originally had only one HD simulcast channel, first known as MHD, which launched in January 2006 and alternated between simulcasts of Mpix and its multiplex channel MorePix. In September 2010, this feed began simulcasting the primary channel exclusively. A high definition simulcast of TMN Encore 2 was launched on September 23, 2012.

==== Starz on Demand ====
Starz operates a subscription video-on-demand television service called Starz on Demand, which is available at no additional charge to new and existing subscribers of Starz. The service, which launched on December 19, 2006, as Mpix on Demand, and later as TMN Encore on Demand, carries feature film content from the two linear Starz television channels. Initially, it featured a rotating program selection that incorporated select new titles that were added each Friday, alongside existing program titles held over from the previous one to two weeks; most programs are now available for a much longer period depending on Starz' term of licence for each program.

==== TMN Encore GO ====
On February 27, 2013, The Movie Network Encore launched TMN Encore GO as a section of TMN GO, TMN's website and mobile app for the iPad, iPhone and iPod Touch, which carries feature film content available for streaming in standard or high definition. TMN Encore GO was initially available to TMN Encore subscribers of Bell Satellite TV, Bell Fibe TV, Cogeco Cable and Rogers Cable.

TMN GO (including TMN Encore GO) was discontinued on November 1, 2018, in connection with the relocation of TMN programming to Crave. Encore's classic film library was not immediately migrated to Crave or its apps, but remained available through service provider-specific video-on-demand websites/apps where it was already available; some recent Starz programming had already been added to Crave's base service as a "limited-time offering". With Encore's relaunch as Starz, all of the service's programming will be accessible on-demand via the Crave platform; most of the Starz content already available as part of Crave's base level will remain there, but any new seasons or other Starz series going forward will require a subscription to the Starz addon.

== Programming ==
The majority of the program content offered by the Starz channels is in the form of classic films. For a time while under the Mpix and TMN Encore names, the channel offered a limited amount of television series in the form of pop culture-related series on the topic of films and filmmaking including:

- Moviehead, a show that takes a snapshot look at a movie and how it was made; hosted by Matt Hawkins aired every Friday before the 9 p.m. Reel Premiere (a weekly debut of a new movie to the service).
- Movie Style, a lifestyle show on TMN Encore 2, hosted by Lisa Williams and Matt Hawkins, that combines films with trends in fashion, design, beauty and entertainment.

Following the January 2018 announcement of Bell's partnership with Starz, Encore began airing selected original programming from that service in advance of a full relaunch scheduled for March 2019. Subsequent to the full relaunch, the service also began carrying other library series that were produced for other channels by Lionsgate, including the Showtime-commissioned series Nurse Jackie and Weeds.

Similar to Crave's output deals with HBO and Showtime, the Bell/Starz partnership covers new and most library series produced and fully owned by Starz and Lionsgate. The Canadian Starz channel has also reclaimed the season premiere rights to some pre-existing series such as Power, past seasons of which first aired on Super Channel, Starz' previous Canadian partner. However, Super Channel retained the premiere rights to The Spanish Princess (a sequel to The White Queen and The White Princess, both of which have since repeated on Starz in Canada). Certain other series commissioned by Starz but distributed internationally by other companies, such as Outlander (produced by Sony and carried in Canada by W Network and Netflix) and American Gods (for which Amazon Video holds worldwide rights outside the U.S.), were not affected at all by this change.

From time to time, Starz has also acquired Canadian rights to series not produced by Lionsgate or commissioned by Starz (U.S.), such as the Hulu-commissioned series The Act, High Fidelity, and Ramy.

=== Movie library ===
From December 1994 to February 2019, the channel primarily aired a rotation of classic films from Sony Pictures, 20th Century Studios, Warner Bros., Universal Pictures, and Paramount Pictures, and their sister companies.

Since the channel was relaunched as Starz, the channel continues to air classic films from the aforementioned studios, though the majority of the channel's film library now comes from the catalogue of Starz parent company Lionsgate and its sister company Summit Entertainment. Beginning in 2020, the channel also began carrying first-run movies from Lionsgate which were released theatrically from late 2019 onwards, starting with the release of Bombshell.

== See also ==
- Crave (TV network) – formerly The Movie Network
- Crave (streaming service) – formerly CraveTV
