= List of Letterkenny characters =

Letterkenny is a Canadian comedy television series created by Jared Keeso and developed by Keeso and Jacob Tierney. The series' first season premiered on CraveTV on February 7, 2016. Throughout its run, the series has featured a variety of actors in both long-term lead roles and inconsistent supporting appearances. Fifteen cast members have appeared in every season.

The pilot episode opens with the text "Letterkenny consists of hicks, skids, hockey players and Christians. These are their problems." While the latter group was phased out early on, the structure of the show revolves around the other three subcultures.

== Cast ==
=== Main cast ===
Actor	Character	Seasons											
Actor	Character	1	2	3	4	5	6	7	8	9	10	11	12
Jared Keeso	Wayne	Main	Main	Main	Main	Main	Main	Main	Main	Main	Main	Main	Main
Nathan Dales	Daryl	Main	Main	Main	Main	Main	Main	Main	Main	Main	Main	Main	Main
Michelle Mylett	Katy	Main	Main	Main	Main	Main	Main	Main	Main	Main	Main	Main	Main
K. Trevor Wilson	Squirrelly Dan	Main	Main	Main	Main	Main	Main	Main	Main	Main	Main	Main	Main
Dylan Playfair	Reilly	Main	Main	Main	Main	Main	Main	Main	Main	Main	Main	Main	Main
Andrew Herr	Jonesy	Main	Main	Main	Main	Main	Main	Main	Main	Main	Main	Main	Main
Tyler Johnston	Stewart	Main	Main	Main	Main	Main	Main	Main	Main	Main	Main	Main	Main
Alexander De Jordy	Devon	Main	Main										
Dan Petronijevic	McMurray	Main	Main	Main	Main	Main	Main	Main	Main	Main	Main	Main	Main
Melanie Scrofano	Mrs. McMurray		Main	Main	Main		Main		Main	Main	Main	Main	Main
Jacob Tierney	Glen	Recurring	Main	Main	Main	Main	Main	Main	Main	Main	Main	Main	Main
Lisa Codrington	Gail	Recurring	Main	Main	Main		Main	Main	Main	Main	Main	Main	Main
Kaniehtiio Horn	Tanis	Recurring	Main	Main	Main	Main		Main	Main	Main	Main	Main	Main
Evan Stern	Roald	Recurring	Recurring	Main	Main	Main	Main	Main	Main	Main	Main	Main	Main
Mark Forward	Coach	Recurring	Recurring	Main	Main	Main		Guest	Main	Main	Main	Main	Main
Sarah Gadon	Gae			Main		Guest	Main						
Magalie Lépine-Blondeau	Marie-Frédérique					Guest	Recurring	Recurring	Main	Guest	Guest		
Clark Backo	Rosie		Recurring	Recurring	Recurring	Guest		Recurring	Main	Main	Main	Main	Main
James Daly	Ron				Recurring	Recurring	Recurring	Recurring	Main	Main	Main	Main	Main
Gregory Waters	Dax				Recurring	Recurring	Recurring	Recurring	Main	Main	Main	Main	Main
Tyler Hynes	Dierks								Main	Recurring	Guest		

=== Recurring cast ===
Actor	Character	Seasons											
Actor	Character	1	2	3	4	5	6	7	8	9	10	11	12
Kamilla Kowal	Bonnie McMurray	Recurring	Recurring	Recurring	Recurring	Recurring	Recurring	Recurring	Recurring	Recurring	Recurring	Recurring	Recurring
Joël Roger Gagné	Joint Boy	Recurring	Recurring	Recurring	Recurring	Recurring	Recurring	Recurring	Recurring	Recurring	Recurring	Guest	
Jay Bertin	Tyson	Recurring	Guest	Recurring	Recurring	Recurring	Recurring	Recurring	Recurring	Recurring	Recurring	Guest	Recurring
Alex McCooeye	Jim Dickens	Recurring	Recurring	Recurring	Recurring	Recurring	Recurring	Recurring	Recurring	Recurring	Recurring	Recurring	Recurring
Bradley Trudeau	Axe	Recurring		Guest	Guest	Guest		Recurring	Guest	Guest	Guest		Recurring
Dylan Cook	Slash	Recurring	Guest	Guest	Recurring	Guest		Recurring	Guest	Guest	Guest		Recurring
Danny VanZandwyck	Darien	Recurring	Recurring	Recurring	Recurring	Recurring	Recurring	Recurring	Recurring	Recurring	Recurring	Recurring	Recurring
Patrick McNeil	Connor	Recurring	Recurring	Recurring	Recurring	Recurring	Recurring	Recurring	Recurring	Recurring	Recurring	Recurring	Recurring
Jeff McEnery	Alexander	Recurring						Recurring		Guest		Recurring	Recurring
Kalinka Petrie	Angie		Recurring	Recurring	Recurring					Recurring			
Alex Spencer	Barts		Recurring	Recurring				Guest	Guest				
Stephen Huszar	Yorkie		Recurring	Recurring				Guest	Guest				
Andrew Hinkson	Sholtzy		Recurring	Recurring				Guest	Guest				
Jordan Johnson-Hinds	Fisky		Recurring	Recurring				Guest	Guest				
Boomer Phillips	Boomtown		Recurring	Recurring				Guest	Guest				
Kim Cloutier	Anik			Guest		Recurring	Recurring	Guest	Guest	Guest	Guest	Guest	Guest
Ian Ronningen	Jivin' Pete			Guest	Guest							Recurring	Recurring
Jess Salgueiro	Mary-Anne					Recurring	Guest	Recurring			Recurring	Guest	Guest
Kelly McCormack	Betty-Anne					Recurring	Guest	Recurring					Guest
Jay Baruchel	Hard Right Jay					Recurring							
Sash Striga	Aly					Guest	Recurring	Guest	Recurring	Recurring	Recurring		Guest
Nadine Bhabha	Bianca						Recurring	Guest	Recurring	Recurring	Recurring		Guest
Cora Eckert	Charity Dyck						Recurring		Guest		Guest	Guest	
Brooke Bruce	Lovina Dyck						Recurring		Guest		Guest		
Olivia Colilli	Chastity Dyck						Recurring		Guest				
Jonathan Torrens	Noah Dyck						Guest		Guest		Guest	Recurring	
Sarah Wayne Callies	Anita Dyck						Guest		Guest		Guest	Recurring	
Lauren Burch	Cassie								Guest	Recurring	Guest	Recurring	
Julia Burch	Tassie								Guest	Recurring	Guest	Recurring	
Vanessa Matsui	Emma								Recurring	Guest	Recurring		
Daniel Harroch	Avi Goldstein									Guest		Recurring	
Elise Bauman	Lucy-Anne											Guest	Guest

== The Hicks ==
=== Wayne ===
Wayne (Note: The show does not definitively state Wayne and Katy's surname, but certain shots of Katy's online profile in the episode "Fartbook" display her surname as "Campbell". Other shots in the episode show no surname, and it has never been mentioned since.) (Jared Keeso) is the leader of the "Hicks", regarded as "toughest guy in Letterkenny." Wayne is protective of his sister and his best friends Daryl and Squirrelly Dan. As a "good old boy," he has a strict code of ethics and manners, but he often gets into fights to protect the community, his friends, and his farm. Even his fighting is strictly ethical: he keeps the fights at the end of the laneway, and he never fights dirty.

Wayne runs the small farm he and his sister live on, along with a produce stand on the property. He takes his work "chorin'" very seriously, sometimes too seriously to the concern of his friends. Wayne loves dogs and is not a fan of children.

Wayne's love life is a major arc in the series, as season 1 sees him getting over his breakup with his high school sweetie Angie, who convinced him to give up fighting. He has an on-off casual relationship with Tanis beginning in season 2, eventually entering into a long-term relationship with Gail's cousin Rosie after arranging for their dogs to mate. At the Great Day for Thunder Bay party celebrating a visit by the Bay brothers, Wayne resists an invitation from Tanis for a tryst in the barn, and instead drives over to Rosie's. She informs him, however, that she plans to move to Vancouver to work in pit bull rescue, and the couple part ways amicably. Although Wayne and Tanis try having a romantic relationship, they realize they are not compatible. Season 5 ends with Wayne being introduced to a Québécois woman named Marie-Fred who is similarly unlucky in love. Wayne intends to propose marriage to Marie-Fred at the end of season 6. The actual proposal never occurs on screen. Later, at the end of season 7, Wayne catches Marie-Fred cheating on him with a Québécois man, ending the relationship for good. Season 8 sees Wayne and Rosie rekindle their relationship and they steadily date from Season 9 to Series 12, until the second to last episode "Stuck" in which Wayne and Rosie are talking about moving away from Letterkenny. This conversation is present for the entirety of the episode as all the other characters talk about aging and feeling stuck in their life at Letterkenny. During the call, the phone connection begins to break up as Rosie is traveling during the final "grass is greener" conversation. Rosie is saying to Wayne that she is "breaking up cowboy" as the connection is getting worse, however it appears to Wayne as "we are breaking up" in the terms of the relationship because they both see a future in different locations.

Wayne is almost always seen in a tucked-in flannel shirt, jeans, and boots, always without a belt. He occasionally wears a turtleneck during the winter months, a clothing choice his companions consider questionable. He is usually seen with his arms crossed and eyes squinted, even when relaxing.

=== Daryl ===
Daryl (Nathan Dales), often referred to as Dary, is a dairy farmer who has been best friends with Wayne since childhood. He is relatively taciturn, speaks in a monotone, and mispronounces words like "basket." Dary is almost constantly in his barn clothes (Though his casual wear consists of checkered shirts, jeans, and cowboy boots), and has trouble communicating with women, leading to most romantic prospects fizzling out. He is often the butt of his friends' jokes. Nevertheless, he is shown to be quick-witted and intellectually curious, with a large vocabulary he can hurl at verbal opponents.

=== Katy ===
Katy (Michelle Mylett) is sister to Wayne. She is confident and well-respected in Letterkenny, although in early episodes she expresses disdain for Dan and especially Daryl. She likes to wear provocative clothing, explaining that covering up is "not my forte." Katy is bisexual and has had many partners throughout the series, including Reilly and Jonesy, and has shown interest in Bonnie McMurray and Mrs. McMurray.

Season 8 sees Katy falling for Dierks, a good-looking but enigmatic American. He accepts her proposal to remain exclusive, but is caught cheating in the season finale. In season 9, a broken-hearted Katy decides to go "scorched earth," dating as many people as possible, before coming to the conclusion that no one in Letterkenny is dateable.

=== Squirrelly Dan ===
"Squirrelly" Dan (K. Trevor Wilson) is the hicks' storyteller with a tendency to append "-s" to singular words as his trademark, e.g. "That's what I appreciates about yous Ms. Katys." Despite this vocal tic, Dan is very intelligent, at one point explaining that "sushi" and "sashimi" are irregular plurals when others mis-pluralize them. In addition, he is very modern and open-minded, taking a women's studies class at a local community college and being open to anal masturbation.

=== McMurray ===
McMurray (Dan Petronijevic) is another member of the agricultural community in Letterkenny and president of the Agricultural Hall. McMurray is of Scottish and Serbian descent, and he is a stereotypical "man's man" full of big talk and sexual machismo, despite wanting to be forward-thinking. He can be called on for any fight the hicks get into that Wayne and friends cannot personally resolve, but while Wayne gets along with him reasonably well most of the Letterkenny residents view him with scorn. McMurray speaks generally with a clenched jaw, so many of his words sound jumbled or slurred.

=== Mrs. McMurray ===
Mrs. McMurray (Melanie Scrofano) is McMurray's wife and his secretary at the Agricultural Hall. She is bisexual and a swinger, along with her husband, and often drinks gin and tonics.

=== Gail ===
Gail (Lisa Codrington) is the owner of MoDean's (and later MoDean's II and MoD3ans). She is hypersexual and highly attracted to Wayne, regularly propositioning him to his mild discomfort. She is prone to occasional outbursts of swearing. She is the cousin of Rosie and Bradley.

=== Others ===
- Bonnie McMurray (Kamilla Kowal) is the younger sister of McMurray, who harbours a crush on Wayne. He thinks she is too young for him, but practically everybody else in town is enamored of her, often speaking her name in unison when she enters a room. She is first employed at the dollar store before working as a bartender at MoDean's. She is one of few characters to have a first and last name.
- Jim Dickins (Alex McCooeye) is an agricultural auctioneer and member of the Agricultural Hall board. He has a tendency to lapse into fast-talk auctioneer speak in daily conversation, and even during sex. For unknown reasons, his name is mispronounced as "Jimmy Dickskin" by almost everyone in town. He is one of the few recurring characters with a first and last name.
- Angie (Kalinka Petrie) is Wayne's ex-girlfriend and high school sweetheart, who later becomes sexually involved with several members of the Letterkenny Irish hockey team. After going abroad, she gains a British accent, to the chagrin of everyone.
- The Ginger and Boots are two rarely seen but often talked about individuals who had sex with an ostrich, allegedly. However, this rumour has given them a fearsome reputation that the Hicks are able to use to their advantage several times.
- Rosie (Clark Backo) is one of Gail's cousins, a bookworm who begins a relationship with Wayne after their dogs mate. She moves away at the beginning of season 5 but later resumes her relationship with Wayne in season 8.
- Bradley (Adrian Holmes) is another of Gail's cousins. He works as a bouncer at MoDean's and is beloved by the Hicks.
- Seth (Seth Gagnon) is a friend of the hicks who occasionally gives them rides. He does not speak and has not been seen outside of his truck.
- Jake (Jared Abrahamson) is Wayne and Katy's American cousin from Michigan. He is a member of the U.S. military.
- Ellen (Lily Gao) is Squirrelly Dan's girlfriend. First mentioned in the episode "Relationships," she surprised Dan by suggesting he "should have some attentions paid to [his] buttshole." They begin a steady relationship in Season 8.
- Alexander (Jeff McEnery) is a "slow-learning fella" who is kicked into a pile of trash behind MoDean's by Angie's new boyfriend in the pilot, spurring Wayne to give up his vow to stop fighting. He is Joint Boy's cousin. Later in the series, he is employed as a janitor at MoDean's 3, where he bemoans the disgusting bathrooms.

== The Jocks ==
=== Reilly and Jonesy ===
Reilly (Dylan Playfair) and Jones, commonly known as "Jonesy" (Andrew Herr) are hockey players and best friends. They are inseparable, doing almost everything together, including sexual "takedowns". At the beginning of the series, they are both dating Katy, and when she decides she wants a monogamous relationship with Reilly, he ends up breaking it off rather than be separated from Jonesy.

At the start of the series, they are accused of being poseurs who enjoy the hockey lifestyle but do not take the game seriously. Through hard work, they become the top scorers on their team, although it still is not enough to keep the team from folding. In the following season, they become assistant coaches for the successful but hot-tempered Letterkenny Shamrockettes, leading them to the championship for the third time in a row. Later, they become top scorers for the Kerry County Eagles, and end up representing Ontario in the National Senior Hockey Championships. They are approached to be spokesmen for BroDude Energy, but fail to convince the company they are marketable.

=== Coach ===
Coach (Mark Forward) is the unnamed Letterkenny hockey teams' coach with anger management issues. He moves up through the local teams along with Reilly and Jonesy, often to their dismay. He is a widower, and his late spouse was named Barbara. He often romanticizes their life together in an explicit and uncomfortably sexual way. He has a tendency to kick a trash can when he gets upset, even taking one along when he's not in the locker room. In season 9, he joins a "beer league" amateur hockey team along with Reilly and Jonesy. His bursts of anger are usually punctuated by him screaming his catchphrase, "It's fucking embarrassing!"

=== Joint Boy ===
Joint Boy (Joël Roger Gagné) is a gym rat who later becomes an ally to both the hockey players and the hicks. He first challenges Wayne's title as the toughest guy in Letterkenny, but they quickly become friends and Wayne often calls him in as back up when preparing for a fight. He is later recruited by Reilly and Jonesy as an enforcer for the Letterkenny Irish. His nickname, "Joint Boy," comes from how frequently he smokes joints.

=== Tyson ===
Tyson (Jason Bertin) is another gym rat who later becomes an ally to both the hockey players and the hicks. He too challenges Wayne's title as the toughest guy in Letterkenny but fights dirty. After Wayne defeats him twice, they grow to become friends. He is later recruited with Joint Boy as an enforcer for the Letterkenny Irish.

=== Shoresy ===
Shore (Jared Keeso), commonly known as Shoresy, is a foul-mouthed hockey player with a high-pitched voice. Shoresy frequently insults Reilly and Jonesy, often alluding to his alleged sexual involvement with their mothers. He has played for the Letterkenny Shamrocks and the Irish, and he has served as a linesman for Shamrockette games. Shoresy is shown to be an extremely talented hockey player, often recruited by Coach when the team is in a tough spot. Within Letterkenny, Shoresy's face is never seen clearly; he is often seen in the shower with his back turned, in a toilet stall with the door closed, or wearing a tinted face shield on his helmet. In Shoresy, a spin-off in which Shoresy moves to Sudbury to continue playing hockey, his face is revealed and fully shown. Shoresy returns to Letterkenny in season 11 to referee beer league games, once again obscuring his face from the camera.

=== Barts, Yorkie, Sholtzy, Fisky, and Boomtown ===
Barts (Alex Spencer), Yorkie (Stephen Huszar), Sholtzy (Andrew Hinkson), Fisky (Jordan Johnson-Hinds), and Boomtown (Boomer Phillips) are five hockey players on the Letterkenny Irish senior team. They always speak in sequence, calling on the next one by name, and becoming anxious when this order is not followed. Barts often completes sentences with "you little bitch," punctuated with Sholtzy adding "pussy." They first respond antagonistically to Reilly and Jonesy, but later the five grow to respect them after they start taking the game more seriously. Initially they are all happily married, but their wives leave them after they sleep with Angie. In season 7, it is revealed that they all have varying degrees of Native heritage as they play for the Kerry County Eagles.

=== Betty-Anne and Mary-Anne ===
Betty-Anne (Kelly McCormack) and Mary-Anne (Jess Salgueiro) are two hockey players on the Letterkenny Shamrockettes. They are both very combative and initially reject Reilly and Jonesy's coaching attempts. They enter conflict over their shared romantic interest in Shoresy, but they later appear to settle into a polyamorous relationship with him.

=== Ron and Dax ===
Ron (James Daly) and Dax (Gregory Waters) are gym rats who serve as gay counterparts to Jonesy and Reilly. Initially they frequently catcall the two, but later befriend them, garnering the nicknames "Ronsy" and "Daxy." They make friends with other Letterkenny residents as well, eventually marrying in a ceremony attended by members of all of Letterkenny's social groups. They later explain to Reilly and Jonesy that it is an open marriage of convenience done for tax purposes.

=== Dierks ===
Dierks Rensburg-van-Koeverdan (Tyler Hynes) is an American friend of Jake's who immediately gets under Wayne's skin due to his slimy and sexist nature. Katy ends up falling for him, and despite Wayne's misgivings, he does not attempt to intervene. Dierks accepts Katy's proposal to make their relationship exclusive, but is caught cheating by Wayne's old flame Marie-Fred, and later by Katy herself, prompting Wayne, Dary, Dan, McMurray, Stewart, Roald, Reilly and Jonesy to beat him up. He is revealed in the season 9 finale to be a new sponsored athlete for Bro-Dude energy drink, as well as Anik's new boyfriend.

=== Others ===
- Jean-Jacques François Jacques-Jean (Max Bouffard), also known as "JJ Frankie JJ", a former NHL player who is the top scorer for the Trois Riviers hockey team. He is also acquainted with several members of Jean-Claude's friend group, who help him in a fight against Shoresy. He is later recruited by Shoresy in Season 1 of the spinoff series to play for the Sudbury Bulldogs.
- Hudson and James Bay (Mark and Craig McMorris), former Letterkenny Shamrocks and brothers now playing professional hockey in Europe. They are the pride of the town to the point that the hicks, skids, hockey players and natives all believe their group should be the one throwing them a welcome party.
- Lucy-Anne (Elise Bauman) is Mary-Anne's teammate following Betty-Anne's departure.

== The Skids ==
=== Stewart ===
Stewart (Tyler Johnston) is the dramatic leader of the skids with a passion for retro video games and electronic music. He is technically minded, has demonstrated his coding ability, and is considered an expert on methamphetamine production. He regularly dances with the rest of the skids in public, and he has performed as a disc jockey on several occasions. He is in love with Katy, much to the dismay of the other skids. They briefly date, but after he tries to use the silent treatment on Katy she breaks it off. He has a large penis which has been compared to a tube of tennis balls or a tall boy can of Red Bull, which Katy is dismayed to learn after breaking up with him without having sex.

=== Devon ===
Devon (Alexander De Jordy) is Stewart's right-hand man in the skids. When Stewart gets into a romantic relationship with Katy, Devon briefly takes over as the skids' leader, but Stewart wins the position back. Devon disappears without explanation before season 3.

=== Roald ===
Roald (Evan Stern) is a deeply insecure and openly gay member of the skids. After Devon's departure, Roald takes his place as Stewart's best friend, and second-in-command. He is somewhat in love with Stewart and is known for pronouncing his name in a monosyllabic squeak.

=== Gae ===
Gae (Sarah Gadon) is a later member of the skids, joining shortly after Devon's departure. She inspires the skids to perform acts of vandalism dressed as clowns, inspired by the 2016 clown sightings. She acts out in an attempt to be returned to her home in the city, which succeeds by the end of season 3. With her season 5 return, she aims to help Stewart sober up, and by season 6 their relationship turns romantic.

=== Others ===
- Darien (Danny VanZandwyck) and Connor (Patrick McNeil) are two silent members of the skids who are usually around when they hang out.
- Hard Right Jay (Jay Baruchel) is an alt-right activist who Stewart meets through the dark web. He travels to Letterkenny in a failed attempt to recruit like-minded people to join him.
- Aly (Sash Striga) and Bianca (Nadine Bhabha) are two drug dealers from the city who enlist help from Stewart, often in exchange for sex.

== The Christians ==
=== Glen ===
Glen (Jacob Tierney) is a flamboyant pastor. Despite having a girlfriend in early episodes (who he did not have sex with), the show hints that he is gay and he is barely able to hide his infatuation with Wayne. Not earning a full living as a preacher, he often takes up other odd jobs, including working at restaurants, at ice cream stores, and at MoDean's as a bartender. His accent suggests he is from the Southern United States.

=== Others ===
- Noah Dyck (Jonathan Torrens) is a member of the local Mennonite community who is unafraid to ask members of the "English" world for help. He remains blissfully unaware of the fact that his last name sounds like "dick," causing frequent double entendres. His wife Anita Dyck (Sarah Wayne Callies) is similar to her husband but a bit more standoffish. Their daughters Charity (Cora Eckert) and Chastity (Olivia Colilli) engage in a sexual relationship with Reilly and Jonesy during Rumspringa but eventually return to the Mennonite world. Noah's younger sister Lovina Dyck (Brooke Bruce) was the object of Squirrelly Dan's affection as a child and he still pines for her.

== The Natives ==
=== Tanis ===
Tanis (Kaniehtiio Horn) is the leader of the Native reservation's cigarette business. She admits it is not a "politically correct" market but justifies it as the proceeds go to improving the lives of people on the Rez.

Although she started out as antagonistic to the Hicks, Skids, and Hockey Players, she is an occasional ally to all three groups. She and Wayne have an on-off relationship that resulted in her pregnancy before she got an abortion.

In Season 7, Tanis seeks a role in the management of the Kerry County Eagles, hoping it will be a good influence on her young relatives. In Season 9 she starts an energy drink company called NDN NRG (pronounced "Indian Energy") that is a blatant rip-off of BroDude.

Tanis also drives the zamboni at the hockey rink.

=== Others ===
- Wally (Joseph Nakogee) is Tanis's estranged father and a marijuana dealer.
- Shyla (Cara Gee) and Shania (Ellyn Jade) are residents of the Native reservation and rivals to Tanis. They recruit Tanis's enforcers to work with them using sex, but Tanis wins them back with her superior cooking.
- Axe (Bradley Trudeau) and Slash (Dylan Cook) are Natives from the Reservation and Tanis' enforcers.
- The Kerry County Eagles is the hockey team from the Reservation. Along with their unnamed junior hockey counterpart, they are known for instilling other teams with a fear of playing against them dubbed the "Native flu." During season 7, Barts, Yorkie, Fisky, Sholtzy and Boomtown join the team as they each have varying degrees of Native heritage. Shoresy, Jonesy and Reilly join in season 8, leading the team to a national championship. Their championship status is revoked when their sponsor realizes Shoresy combined their DNA samples into one cup instead of sending three separate samples.
- The Native Coach (Brooker Muir) is the unnamed coach of the Kerry County Eagles. Tanis makes a bet with him that her reformed Letterkenny Irish can defeat the Eagles, promising him oral sex if he wins. He wins the bet but opts to forgo the terms of their deal in exchange for taking Tanis out on a proper date.

== Québécois (Les Hiques) ==
=== Anik ===
Anik (Kim Cloutier) is a member of the Québécois faction of hicks (French: ploucs) whom the Letterkenny group meet while ice fishing. Although she and Daryl have a connection, she becomes engaged to another man, Jean-Claude. She leaves Jean-Claude at their buck and doe party and begins a relationship with Daryl. Daryl becomes jealous of her racy Instagram posts, causing her to break it off with him. Jonesy and Reilly later recruit her to model with them for BroDude energy, but the company representative decides to sign Anik without the two of them. She later begins a relationship with Katy's ex Dierks.

=== Marie-Frédérique ===
Marie-Frédérique (Magalie Lépine-Blondeau), usually referred to as "Marie-Fred", is a Québécoise woman with whom Wayne begins a romantic relationship in season 6. She has a similar personality to Wayne. They are engaged in season 7 until Wayne catches her cheating on him with a French man. Despite this, Marie-Fred helps Wayne discover Dierks's true nature in season 8. In Season 10, Wayne returns the favor by helping Marie-Fred buy a car from an English dealer, proving that their relationship has grown amicable. However, it is clear she still has regretful feelings for her actions and causing her to lose him, as it references the "white whale" line used by the English dealer.

=== Others ===
- Jean-Guy (Sébastien Huberdeau) is Anik's brother and the Québécois counterpart to Wayne.
- Jean-Carl (Alexandre Landry) and Jean-Pierre (Domenic Di Rosa) are the other members of "Les Hiques." They are Québécois counterparts to Daryl and Squirrelly Dan.
- Jean-Claude (Pierre-Yves Cardinal) is Anik's fiancé and Marie-Fred's brother. He is deeply anti-English.
- Jean-Lance (François Macdonald) is Jean-Claude's best man and cousin who shares Jean-Claude's sentiments.

== Guest stars ==
- Gavin Crawford as a standup comedian ("Letterkenny Talent Show")
- Jay Onrait and Dan O'Toole as themselves ("Great Day for Thunder Bay", "Miss Fire")
- Kate Beirness and Tessa Bonhomme as themselves ("Crack N Ag", "Miss Fire")
- Scott Cozens and Sheldon Smithens as themselves ("Yard Sale Saturday")
- Nazneen Contractor as Professor Tricia ("Letterkenny Celebrates International Women's Day")
