= 17th Canadian Comedy Awards =

Awards ceremony for works of 2015–16

- Date: 6 November 2016
- Location: The Second City; Toronto, Ontario
- Country: Canada
- Presented by: Canadian Comedy Foundation for Excellence

Highlights
- Most wins: Trailer Park Boys (2)
- Most nominations: Trailer Park Boys (3)
- Website: www.canadiancomedyawards.org

The 17th Canadian Comedy Awards, presented by the Canadian Comedy Foundation for Excellence (CCFE), honoured the best live, television, film, and Internet comedy from 1 January 2015 to 30 June 2016.

This was a transitional year which saw a reorganization of the awards. Due to budgetary and time limitations, Canadian Comedy Awards, also known as Beavers, were awarded in only nine categories with all nominees and winners decided by public vote. There was no festival or gala ceremony.

Trailer Park Boys led with three nominations, for their TV show, podcast, and feature. They won Beavers for the former two categories.

== Reorganization and abbreviated awards ==
The Canadian Comedy Awards (CCA) had been put on hold when the license expired in 2015. When the separation process was completed in 2016, there had been insufficient time for the usual consultation with industry members in creating categories, selecting juries and nominees. Industry-voting categories were set aside and nine categories were made available for online public voting in two rounds. An initial round of voting from 8 to 30 September determined nominees, and a second round of voting from 3 to 16 October determined the winners.

Due to time and budgetary limitations, there was no CCA festival or awards gala for this year. Winners were announced at a nominees reception at The Second City in Toronto, Ontario, on 6 November 2016.

== Winners and nominees ==
27,062 people voted online for winners in nine categories.

Winners are listed first and highlighted in boldface:

Comedic Artist of the Year	Best Feature
**Mike Ward**; Kenny Hotz; K. Trevor Wilson; Jus Reign; Graham Clark	**Pure Pwnage**; Your Money Or Your Wife; Turbo Kid; Trailer Park Boys: Drunk, High & Unemployed; How to Plan an Orgy in a Small Town
Best Audio Show or Series	Best Short
**Trailer Park Boys Podcast**; Taggart And Torrens; Stop Podcasting Yourself; Retail Nightmares; Real Good Show	**Kenny Hotz's Getting An Election**; Thank You; Lottery; Got Your Nose; Dogs N Buns
Best Live Production	Best Live Ensemble
**The Comic Strippers**; One Night Only; Collapse; Colin Mochrie & Wayne Jones; Cannibal The Musical (Note: Cannibal! The Musical ran 10 Feb – 8 Mar 2015 at Toronto's Panasonic Theatre.)	**James & Jamesy** (Note: James and Jamesy is the comic duo of Alastair Knowles and Aaron Malkin.); The Sunday Service; The Ryan and Amy Show; Sex T Rex; Dame Judy Dench
Best Standup Comic	Best TV Show
**Brian Aylward**; Lori Gibbs; Derek Seguin; Debra DiGiovanni; Darrin Rose	**Trailer Park Boys** – season 9; Schitt's Creek; Out There with Melissa DiMarco; Letterkenny; Baroness von Sketch Show
Best Web Series
**Just Passing Through** season 2; Soft Targets; Sex and the Single Parent; Riftworld Chronicles; Larps
