= Karen Baldwin =

Karen Baldwin may refer to:

- Karen Dianne Baldwin (born 1963), Canadian actress, television host and beauty queen
- Karen Baldwin (producer) (born 1964), Canadian film producer
- Karen Baldwin (character), a character from the American science fiction web television series For All Mankind
