= Dylan Playfair =

Canadian actor (born 1992)

- Born: June 19, 1992 (age 34); Fort St. James, British Columbia, Canada
- Occupation: Actor
- Years active: 2012–present

Dylan Playfair (born June 19, 1992) is a Canadian actor. He is most noted for his starring role as Reilly in Letterkenny (2016–2023).

== Early life ==
Playfair comes from a hockey family. Before becoming an actor, Playfair played hockey as a forward for the Merritt Centennials of the BCHL. He is the son of former NHL player Jim Playfair and nephew of Larry Playfair.

== Career ==
Playfair started his acting his career in children's film and television. Beginning in 2014, he played Knox in the YTV series Some Assembly Required for all three seasons until the show was cancelled in 2016. In 2017, Playfair joined Disney's Descendants franchise playing the role of Gil, Gaston's son, in Descendants 2 and Descendants 3.

Playfair has often acted in roles involving hockey, due in part to his skating skills. In 2013 he acted, alongside his future Letterkenny co-star Andrew Herr, in Mr. Hockey: The Gordie Howe Story as Gordie Howe's son Marty Howe. In 2016, Playfair started work on the hit Canadian show Letterkenny, as Reilly, one of the town's jocks. He has also toured North America as part of the Letterkenny Live! tour. Playfair had earlier played the same character in the Letterkenny web series. This 'typecasting' has continued, as he joined the cast of The Mighty Ducks: Game Changers as Coach T.

== Filmography ==
=== Film ===
Year	Title	Role	Notes
2012	Grave Encounters 2	Trevor Thompson	
2013	If I Had Wings	Tyson	
2014	Cheat	Receptionist	
2016	It Stains the Sands Red	Robbie	
2017	Still/Born	Robbie	Uncredited
2020	The Sinners	Kit Anderson	
2020	Summerland	Shawn Walker	
2020	Odd Man Rush	Dean Hunter	
2022	Dangerous Game: The Legacy Murders	Cameron Betts	
2023	Buddy Games: Spring Awakening	Larry Lampshade	
2025	Influencers	Cameron	
2025	The Legend of Johnny Jones	Officer Davis	
2025	Above the Line	Cowboy	
2026	Mike & Nick & Nick & Alice	Stoned Cashier	
2026	Send the Rain	Finn	

=== Television ===
Year	Title	Role	Notes
2013	Mr. Hockey: The Gordie Howe Story	Marty Howe	Television film
2014	Damaged	Dylan	Television film
2014–2016	Some Assembly Required	Knox	Main role
2015	The Hollow	Toby	Television film
2016	Haters Back Off	Owen	3 episodes
2016	Gorgeous Morons	AJ	Television film
2016–2018	Travelers	Kyle	6 episodes
2016–2023	Letterkenny	Reilly	Main role
2017	Descendants 2	Gil	Television film
2019	The Order	Clay Turner	3 episodes
2019	Descendants 3	Gil	Television film
2021–2022	The Mighty Ducks: Game Changers	Coach T	9 episodes
2023	Animal Control	Cole	Episode: "Unicorns and Mountain Lions"
