= List of Letterkenny episodes =

Letterkenny is a Canadian television sitcom created by Jared Keeso and directed by Jacob Tierney, that premiered on Crave on February 7, 2016. In November 2023, it was announced that Letterkenny would conclude with its twelfth season.

During the course of the series, 81 episodes of Letterkenny aired over twelve seasons, between February 7, 2016, and December 25, 2023.

== Series overview ==
Letterkenny seasons
| Season | Episodes | Originally released |
|---|---|---|
| 1 | 6 | February 7, 2016 |
| 2 | 6 | December 25, 2016 |
| Special | | March 17, 2017 |
| 3 | 6 | July 1, 2017 |
| Special | | October 20, 2017 |
| 4 | 6 | December 25, 2017 |
| Special | | March 23, 2018 |
| 5 | 6 | June 29, 2018 |
| Special | | November 23, 2018 |
| 6 | 6 | December 25, 2018 |
| Special | | February 1, 2019 |
| 7 | 6 | October 11, 2019 |
| 8 | 7 | December 25, 2019 |
| 9 | 7 | December 25, 2020 |
| 10 | 6 | December 25, 2021 |
| Special | | March 8, 2022 |
| 11 | 6 | December 25, 2022 |
| Special | | May 19, 2023 |
| 12 | 6 | December 25, 2023 |

== Episodes ==
=== Season 1 (2016) ===
Letterkenny season 1 episodes
| No. overall | No. in season | Title | Directed by | Written by | Original release date |
|---|---|---|---|---|---|
| 1 | 1 | "Ain't No Reason to Get Excited" | Jacob Tierney | Jared Keeso & Jacob Tierney | February 7, 2016 |
Daryl and Katy try to help Wayne, while Wayne reconnects with his inner fighter.
| 2 | 2 | "Super Soft Birthday" | Jacob Tierney | Jared Keeso & Jacob Tierney | February 7, 2016 |
Wayne and Katy plan for Daryl's annual super soft birthday party.
| 3 | 3 | "Fartbook" | Jacob Tierney | Jared Keeso & Jacob Tierney | February 7, 2016 |
Dan's farting inspires a genius idea for the Hicks.
| 4 | 4 | "Wingman Wayne" | Jacob Tierney | Jared Keeso & Jacob Tierney | February 7, 2016 |
It's competition time in Letterkenny! The first Hick to score some tail gets fifty bucks off their bar tab.
| 5 | 5 | "Rave" | Jacob Tierney | Jared Keeso & Jacob Tierney | February 7, 2016 |
Daryl comes up with the idea to start a pest removal business. Stewart decides to become a superstar DJ and host his own rave.
| 6 | 6 | "A Fuss in the Back Bush" | Jacob Tierney | Jared Keeso & Jacob Tierney | February 7, 2016 |
The town descends into a revenge-fueled brawl, thanks to the Skids and their shady business practices.

=== Season 2 (2016) ===
Letterkenny season 2 episodes
| No. overall | No. in season | Title | Directed by | Written by | Original release date |
|---|---|---|---|---|---|
| 7 | 1 | "A Fuss at the Ag Hall" | Jacob Tierney | Jared Keeso & Jacob Tierney | December 25, 2016 |
The Hicks attempt to establish order at Ag Hall while Reilly and Jonesy make the jump to Senior Hockey.
| 8 | 2 | "The Election" | Jacob Tierney | Jared Keeso & Jacob Tierney | December 25, 2016 |
The Hicks, Skids, and Jocks participate in a Letterkenny election.
| 9 | 3 | "Relationships" | Jacob Tierney | Jared Keeso & Jacob Tierney | December 25, 2016 |
Wayne doubles down on finding love.
| 10 | 4 | "The Native Flu" | Jacob Tierney | Jared Keeso & Jacob Tierney | December 25, 2016 |
Riley and Jonesy have an away game on the Rez.
| 11 | 5 | "Uncle Eddie's Trust" | Jacob Tierney | Jared Keeso & Jacob Tierney | December 25, 2016 |
Wayne and Katy inherit some money. Folks from Letterkenny pitch them on why it should be theirs.
| 12 | 6 | "Finding Stormy a Stud" | Jacob Tierney | Jared Keeso & Jacob Tierney | December 25, 2016 |
Tension rises around Letterkenny while Wayne looks for a stud to breed with his beloved German Shepherd "Stormy".

=== St. Patrick's Day special (2017) ===
Letterkenny St. Patrick's Day special
| No. overall | Title | Directed by | Written by | Original release date |
|---|---|---|---|---|
| 13 | "St. Perfect's Day" | Jacob Tierney | Jared Keeso & Jacob Tierney | March 17, 2017 |
The Hicks help Daryl recall an amazing St. Patrick's Day party.

=== Season 3 (2017) ===
Letterkenny season 3 episodes
| No. overall | No. in season | Title | Directed by | Written by | Original release date |
|---|---|---|---|---|---|
| 14 | 1 | "Sled Shack" | Jacob Tierney | Jared Keeso & Jacob Tierney | July 1, 2017 |
The Hicks try to improve their sled shack.
| 15 | 2 | "Puck Bunny" | Jacob Tierney | Jared Keeso & Jacob Tierney | July 1, 2017 |
The Hicks try to lure Degens from upcountry to the sled shack. Reilly and Jonesy learn the identity of the Puck Bunny.
| 16 | 3 | "MoDeans 2" | Jacob Tierney | Jared Keeso & Jacob Tierney | July 1, 2017 |
Modean's reopens. The Hicks have a bone to pick with Jivin' Pete.
| 17 | 4 | "Les Hiques" | Jacob Tierney | Jonathan Torrens | July 1, 2017 |
The Hicks go ice fishing in Quebec and meet their French-Canadian counterparts.
| 18 | 5 | "The Battle for Bonnie McMurray" | Jacob Tierney | Jared Keeso & Jacob Tierney | July 1, 2017 |
Bonnie McMurray invites Katy and the guys to a hot tub party.
| 19 | 6 | "Bradley Is a Killer" | Jacob Tierney | Jared Keeso & Jacob Tierney | July 1, 2017 |
The Hicks are excited for Bradley's arrival. The Jocks bond.

=== Halloween special (2017) ===
Letterkenny Halloween special
| No. overall | Title | Directed by | Written by | Original release date |
|---|---|---|---|---|
| 20 | "The Haunting of MoDean's II" | Jacob Tierney | Lynne Kamm | October 20, 2017 |
The Hicks help their old pal Gail get to the bottom of a strange brew happening at the local bar.

=== Season 4 (2017) ===
Letterkenny season 4 episodes
| No. overall | No. in season | Title | Directed by | Written by | Original release date |
|---|---|---|---|---|---|
| 21 | 1 | "Never Work a Day in Your Life" | Jacob Tierney | Jared Keeso & Jacob Tierney | December 25, 2017 |
It's Gail's birthday, but in an effort to forget Rosie, Wayne is non-stop chorin'.
| 22 | 2 | "A Fuss at the Golf Course" | Jacob Tierney | Jared Keeso & Jacob Tierney | December 25, 2017 |
The Hicks and McMurrays defend the majestic Canada Goose down at the local golf course. The turf war for the Dollar Store continues.
| 23 | 3 | "Way to a Man's Heart" | Jacob Tierney | Jared Keeso & Jacob Tierney | December 25, 2017 |
Tanis recruits the Hicks, who recruit the Hockey Players, to help with a feud on the Rez.
| 24 | 4 | "Letterkenny Talent Show" | Jacob Tierney | Jared Keeso & Jacob Tierney | December 25, 2017 |
Letterkenny locals put on their special skills on display with their own talent show.
| 25 | 5 | "The Letterkenny Leave" | Jacob Tierney | Jesse McKeown | December 25, 2017 |
The Hicks attend a hot tub party at the McMurray's. The Hockey Players decide to do whatever it takes to get gains.
| 26 | 6 | "Great Day for Thunder Bay" | Jacob Tierney | Jonathan Torrens | December 25, 2017 |
The Bay Brothers return home for Hay and all of Letterkenny wants to be the one to throw them a party.

=== Easter special (2018) ===
Letterkenny Easter special
| No. overall | Title | Directed by | Written by | Original release date |
|---|---|---|---|---|
| 27 | "Super Hard Easter" | Jacob Tierney | Jared Keeso & Jacob Tierney | March 23, 2018 |
It's Easter and it's Daryl's turn to hide the eggs. Glen and his unlikely sidekicks put on a Passion Play.

=== Season 5 (2018) ===
Letterkenny season 5 episodes
| No. overall | No. in season | Title | Directed by | Written by | Original release date |
|---|---|---|---|---|---|
| 28 | 1 | "We Don't Fight at Weddings" | Jacob Tierney | Trevor Risk & Jared Keeso & Jacob Tierney | June 29, 2018 |
The Hicks, Skids, and Jocks attend a Letterkenny wedding.
| 29 | 2 | "The Ol' College Try" | Jacob Tierney | Jared Keeso & Jacob Tierney | June 29, 2018 |
Wayne tries on a new relationship. The Skids get deeper into the Dark Web. The Jocks meet their new team.
| 30 | 3 | "Hard Right Jay" | Jacob Tierney | Jesse McKeown | June 29, 2018 |
An out-of-towner causes a ruckus in Letterkenny.
| 31 | 4 | "Letterkenny Spelling Bee" | Jacob Tierney | Jared Keeso & Jacob Tierney | June 29, 2018 |
Competition heats up at Letterkenny's Adult Spelling Bee.
| 32 | 5 | "Back to Back to Back" | Jacob Tierney | Jared Keeso & Jacob Tierney | June 29, 2018 |
The Jocks try to win their first championship and Stewart is visited by some old friends.
| 33 | 6 | "Bock et Biche" | Jacob Tierney | Jonathan Torrens | June 29, 2018 |
The Hicks and Jocks travel to Quebec for Anik's pre-wedding party.

=== Christmas special (2018) ===
Letterkenny Christmas special
| No. overall | Title | Directed by | Written by | Original release date |
|---|---|---|---|---|
| 34 | "The Three Wise Men" | Jacob Tierney | Sonja Bennett | November 23, 2018 |
The Hicks throw a Christmas party.

=== Season 6 (2018) ===
Letterkenny season 6 episodes
| No. overall | No. in season | Title | Directed by | Written by | Original release date |
|---|---|---|---|---|---|
| 35 | 1 | "What Could Be So Urgent?" | Jacob Tierney | Jared Keeso & Jacob Tierney | December 25, 2018 |
Wayne and Marie Fred wonder about a stranger's urinal habits. Reilly and Jonesy begin a takedown tourney with Dax and Ron.
| 36 | 2 | "Bush Party Season" | Jacob Tierney | Jared Keeso & Jacob Tierney | December 25, 2018 |
The Hicks host a bush party. The skids make an enemy.
| 37 | 3 | "The City" | Jacob Tierney | Jared Keeso & Jacob Tierney | December 25, 2018 |
The Hicks take a trip to the City, cause when a friend asks for help, you help them.
| 38 | 4 | "Dyck's Slip Out" | Jacob Tierney | Jonathan Torrens | December 25, 2018 |
The Hicks attempt to help Noah Dyck and Anita Dyck find their daughters.
| 39 | 5 | "Different Strokes For Different Folks" | Jacob Tierney | Trevor Risk | December 25, 2018 |
It's the annual Century Club challenge at Modean's. Katy is disturbed by McMurray.
| 40 | 6 | "Yew!" | Jacob Tierney | Jared Keeso & Jacob Tierney | December 25, 2018 |
There's trouble in paradise for Anik and Dary. Wayne makes a decision about Marie Fred. As Scottie Wallis would say, "Yew!"

=== Valentine's Day special (2019) ===
Letterkenny Valentine's Day special
| No. overall | Title | Directed by | Written by | Original release date |
|---|---|---|---|---|
| 41 | "Valentimes Day" | Jacob Tierney | Trevor Risk | February 1, 2019 |
The gang tries speed-dating, and Wayne finds an unlikely friend.

=== Season 7 (2019) ===
Letterkenny season 7 episodes
| No. overall | No. in season | Title | Directed by | Written by | Original release date |
|---|---|---|---|---|---|
| 42 | 1 | "Crack N Ag" | Jacob Tierney | Trevor Risk | October 11, 2019 |
The boys start a call in show called "Crack N Ag" to help other farmers and residents of Letterkenny.
| 43 | 2 | "Red Card Yellow Card" | Jacob Tierney | Jared Keeso & Jacob Tierney | October 11, 2019 |
To help streamline and speed up the conversation, Wayne uses a soccer yellow card, red card system.
| 44 | 3 | "Nut" | Jacob Tierney | Trevor Risk | October 11, 2019 |
Dan's private viewing habits are exposed.
| 45 | 4 | "Letterkenny vs Penny" | Jacob Tierney | Jonathan Torrens | October 11, 2019 |
To help raise money for Don Cherry's Pet Rescue Foundation, Wayne and Katy go head to head to see who can collect the most pennies.
| 46 | 5 | "W's Talk, Baby" | Jacob Tierney | Jonathan Torrens | October 11, 2019 |
Tanis tries to get the Irish back together.
| 47 | 6 | "In It to Win It" | Jacob Tierney | Jared Keeso & Jacob Tierney | October 11, 2019 |
Daryl heads back to Quebec. The Jocks battle the Native team.

=== Season 8 (2019) ===
Letterkenny season 8 episodes
| No. overall | No. in season | Title | Directed by | Written by | Original release date |
|---|---|---|---|---|---|
| 48 | 1 | "Miss Fire" | Jacob Tierney | Jared Keeso & Jacob Tierney | December 25, 2019 |
The Hicks support Wayne. Reilly and Jonesy continue the hunt for the big ship. Stewart has made some changes.
| 49 | 2 | "National Senior Hockey Championship" | Jacob Tierney | Jared Keeso & Jacob Tierney | December 25, 2019 |
The Hicks continue to be there for their friend. The Jocks play Quebec. Stewart learns to fight.
| 50 | 3 | "The Rippers" | Jacob Tierney | Jared Keeso & Jacob Tierney | December 25, 2019 |
Wayne's American cousin plans a road trip south of the border.
| 51 | 4 | "Ferda" | Jacob Tierney | Trevor Risk | December 25, 2019 |
The Jocks start a club for men. The skids go to the city.
| 52 | 5 | "Yard Sale Saturday" | Jacob Tierney | Jared Keeso & Jacob Tierney | December 25, 2019 |
Everybody's dickering on Yard Sale Saturday.
| 53 | 6 | "Holy Sheet" | Jacob Tierney | Jonathan Torrens | December 25, 2019 |
The Hicks help the Mennonites with some choring.
| 54 | 7 | "Day Beers Day" | Jacob Tierney | Jared Keeso & Jacob Tierney | December 25, 2019 |
It's Day Beers Day. Katy takes a trip.

=== Season 9 (2020) ===
Letterkenny season 9 episodes
| No. overall | No. in season | Title | Directed by | Written by | Original release date |
|---|---|---|---|---|---|
| 55 | 1 | "American Buck and Doe" | Jacob Tierney | Jared Keeso & Jacob Tierney | December 25, 2020 |
Post-fight with Dierks, the Hicks, Skids, and Jocks attend an American Buck and Doe.
| 56 | 2 | "Kids with Problems" | Jacob Tierney | Jared Keeso & Mark Forward | December 25, 2020 |
Kids with problems are given important life lessons...and hot dogs.
| 57 | 3 | "Scorched Earth" | Jacob Tierney | Sonja Bennett | December 25, 2020 |
Katy takes her scorched earth strategy to Letterkenny. Gail gets some action of her own.
| 58 | 4 | "Mitzvah" | Jacob Tierney | Daniel Harroch | December 25, 2020 |
The Jocks learn about Judaism.
| 59 | 5 | "Sleepover" | Jacob Tierney | Jared Keeso & Jacob Tierney | December 25, 2020 |
Sleepover activities only; movies, board games and girl talk.
| 60 | 6 | "Breastaurant" | Jacob Tierney | Trevor Risk | December 25, 2020 |
A breastaurant opens in Letterkenny.
| 61 | 7 | "NDN NRG" | Jacob Tierney | Jared Keeso | December 25, 2020 |
Tanis starts her own energy drink.

=== Season 10 (2021) ===
Letterkenny season 10 episodes
| No. overall | No. in season | Title | Directed by | Written by | Original release date |
|---|---|---|---|---|---|
| 62 | 1 | "King of Suckers" | Jacob Tierney | Jared Keeso & Jacob Tierney | December 25, 2021 |
A new energy drink launches and finds some eager consumers in town, but the drink's introduction has some interesting consequences. The Hicks, Skids, and Jocks reminisce over their latest donnybrook with Dierks.
| 63 | 2 | "Dealership" | Jacob Tierney | Jared Keeso & Jacob Tierney | December 25, 2021 |
Wayne and McMurray help Marie-Fred buy a car from a problematic car dealer.
| 64 | 3 | "Dyck Meat" | Jacob Tierney | Jared Keeso & Jonathan Torrens | December 25, 2021 |
The Hicks attend a sausage party. A video game battle between the Jocks and Skids leads to some fierce competition.
| 65 | 4 | "Prostate" | Jacob Tierney | Jared Keeso & Jacob Tierney | December 25, 2021 |
Wayne, Daryl, Tyson, and Coach psych themselves up for their first ever prostate exam.
| 66 | 5 | "VidVok" | Jacob Tierney | Jared Keeso & Jacob Tierney | December 25, 2021 |
The Jocks and Skids compete for VidVok fame, each seeking big numbers of fans. After taking a Zamboni gig at the rink, Wayne and Shoresy finally meet face to face.
| 67 | 6 | "Sundays Are for Picking Stones" | Jacob Tierney | Jared Keeso & Jacob Tierney | December 25, 2021 |
The Hicks recruit help for the difficult task of picking stones, but find the help comes with some problems. Meanwhile, Shoresy moves to Sudbury to join a senior AAA hockey team.

=== International Women's Day special (2022) ===
Letterkenny International Women's Day special
| No. overall | Title | Directed by | Written by | Original release date |
|---|---|---|---|---|
| 68 | "Letterkenny Celebrates International Women's Day" | Jacob Tierney | Olivia Stadler & Allie Pearse & Jared Keeso | March 8, 2022 |
The women of Letterkenny host the first annual Anti-Beauty Pageant, while the men spend a productive afternoon with Professor Tricia (Nazneen Contractor).

=== Season 11 (2022) ===
Letterkenny season 11 episodes
| No. overall | No. in season | Title | Directed by | Written by | Original release date |
|---|---|---|---|---|---|
| 69 | 1 | "Chips" | Jacob Tierney | Jared Keeso & Jacob Tierney | December 25, 2022 |
The gang hosts a fishbowl to determine the best chip flavor of all time. Jonesy and Reilly help Glen get his pump on.
| 70 | 2 | "Okoya" | Jacob Tierney | Jared Keeso & Jacob Tierney | December 25, 2022 |
Glen and Tanis investigate who stole the church bake sale money. Wayne and Squirrely Dan wait for a furniture delivery.
| 71 | 3 | "Lost Dog" | Jacob Tierney | Jared Keeso & Jacob Tierney | December 25, 2022 |
Wayne and Glen lead the search for a missing dog, while Squirrely Dan and the skids seek help from a psychic. Reilly and Jonesy's sweeties crash their Beer League game, much to Shoresy's delight.
| 72 | 4 | "Nudes" | Jacob Tierney | Jared Keeso & Daniel Harroch | December 25, 2022 |
The Ladies track down who leaked Gail's nudes. The skids enlist Goldstein to push their product for them.
| 73 | 5 | "Influenzas" | Jacob Tierney | Jared Keeso & Sara Wren | December 25, 2022 |
Katy and the McMurrays rent their barns out to influencers. Coach brings his controversial methods to the Women's Hockey League. Jivin' Pete makes peace with the Hicks.
| 74 | 6 | "Degens" | Jacob Tierney | Jared Keeso & Jacob Tierney | December 25, 2022 |
The Hicks face off against the Degens after Wayne and Jivin' Pete have a falling out. Wayne becomes "that guy" after getting a pair of prescription sunglasses. Reilly celebrates his birthday week at MoDean's.

=== Victoria Day special (2023) ===
Letterkenny Victoria Day special
| No. overall | Title | Directed by | Written by | Original release date |
|---|---|---|---|---|
| 75 | "May 2–4" | Jacob Tierney | Trevor Risk | May 19, 2023 |
The Hicks and the McMurray's Victoria Day celebration turns sour when their Aussie and Kiwi cousins get into a donnybrook. Meanwhile, Glen shows off his pyrotechnic skills with a fireworks display.

=== Season 12 (2023) ===
Letterkenny season 12 episodes
| No. overall | No. in season | Title | Directed by | Written by | Original release date |
|---|---|---|---|---|---|
| 76 | 1 | "Live at MoDean's" | Jacob Tierney | Jared Keeso & Allie Pearse & Olivia Stadler | December 25, 2023 |
After Katy goes too far while roasting Daryl during a stand-up comedy night at MoDean's, Daryl finds himself being courted by the Degens. Rosie, unable to deny her desire to leave Letterkenny and explore the world, moves away again. Wayne agrees with her that they should break up.
| 77 | 2 | "Sun Darts" | Jacob Tierney | Jared Keeso & Jacob Tierney | December 25, 2023 |
The Hicks and Skids help local auctioneer Jim Dickens create a song and music video to aid his dream of becoming a country music star. Daryl continues to hang out with the Degens.
| 78 | 3 | "I'm a Degen" | Jacob Tierney | Jared Keeso & Trevor Risk | December 25, 2023 |
Daryl reluctantly goes deeper into his new friendship with the Degens, but starts making plans to leave when the Degens' Saturday night ritual proves too much. Jivin' Pete coerces Daryl into calling himself a Degen on video, which makes everyone in Letterkenny reluctant to help Wayne save him.
| 79 | 4 | "Snooters" | Jacob Tierney | Jared Keeso & Allie Pearse & Olivia Stadler | December 25, 2023 |
Terrified that they have done everything there is to do on cocaine, the Skids make a desperate final attempt to have fun by opening an after-hours club.
| 80 | 5 | "Stuck" | Jacob Tierney | Jared Keeso & Jacob Tierney | December 25, 2023 |
Wayne convinces the other Letterkenny residents to help him save Daryl from the Degens, sparking a brawl between the two groups.
| 81 | 6 | "Over and Out" | Jacob Tierney | Jared Keeso & Jacob Tierney & Sonja Bennett | December 25, 2023 |
Daryl settles back into his role with the Hicks. The Skids go back to their roots and arrange a rave for the whole town at the agriculture hall, but struggle to decide on what musical genre will attract everyone.
