= Kim Cloutier =

Canadian underwear and fashion model

- Born: March 25, 1987 (age 39); Montreal, Quebec, Canada
- Modelling information
- Height: 1.77 m (5 ft 9 1/2 in)
- Hair colour: Light brown
- Eye colour: Blue

Kim Cloutier (French: [klutje]; born March 25, 1987) is a Canadian underwear and fashion model, known for numerous lingerie, swimsuit and cosmetics campaigns.

== Career ==
Cloutier has appeared in the 2009 Sports Illustrated Swimsuit Edition. She has also appeared in the 2014 The Cobbler with Adam Sandler.

She has appeared on the cover of Flare's summer 2007 issue (Canada), in multiple spreads and features for international websites in Croatia, France, and Vietnam.

She has also appeared in Elle Accessories (Canada), Glow Magazine (Canada) and Sirene (Denmark).

Since 2010, Cloutier appeared in commercials for Soma Intimates.

She has also appeared in eight episodes of the Canadian television program Letterkenny as Anik, a Quebecoise woman and love interest of one of the main cast. Additionally, she appears in its spinoff series, Shoresy.

In August 2018, Canadian media company, Corus Entertainment announced that Cloutier would be the host of its upcoming reality TV fashion design competition series Stitched, which premiered in September 2018.

== Agencies ==
- Next Models Canada (mother agent)
- Ford Models in New York and Paris
- NEXT Model Management in Milan
- Premier Model Management in London
- Mega in Germany
- View in Barcelona
