= Christian Lopez (musician) =

American singer-songwriter (born 1995)

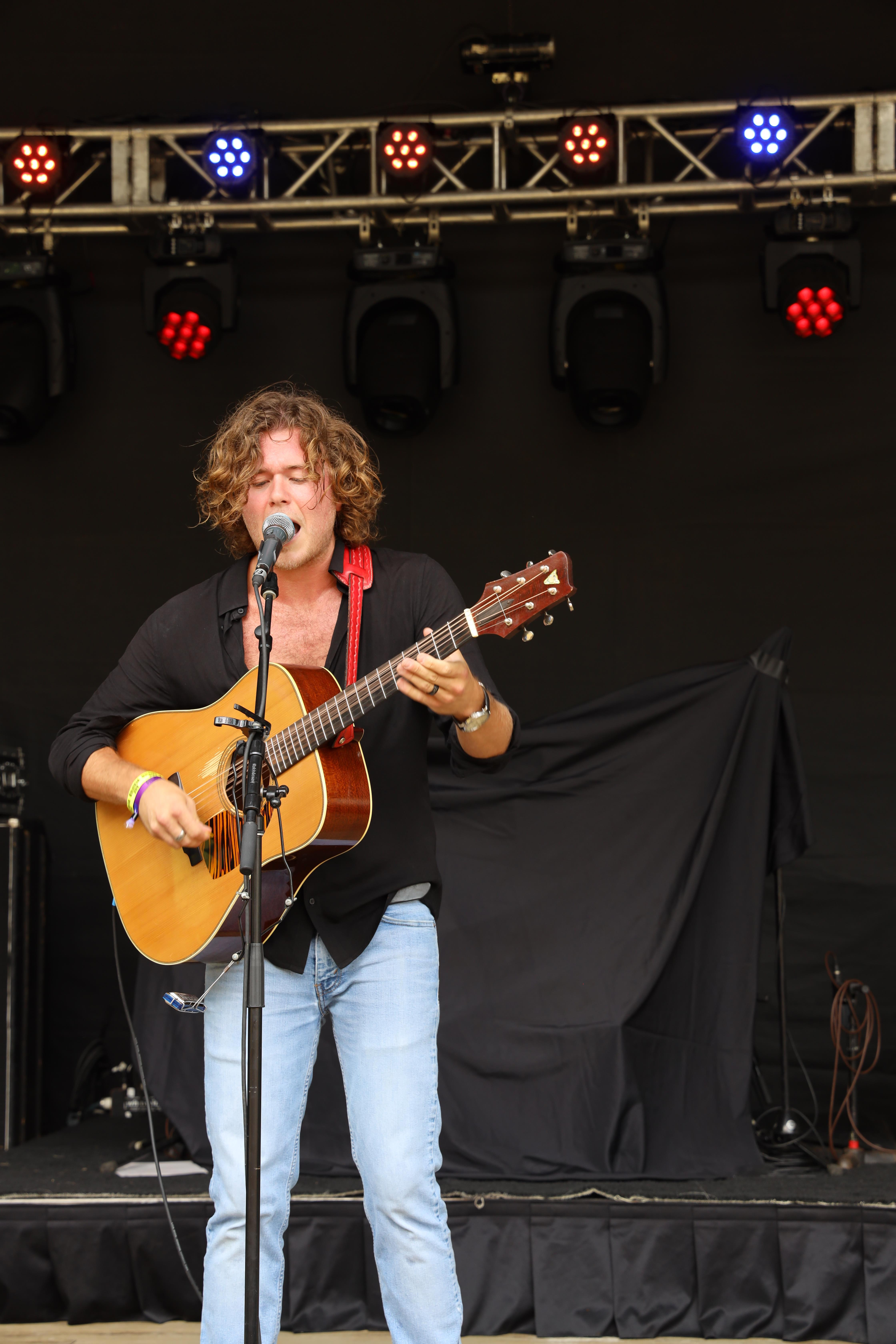

Background information
- Born: August 1, 1995 (age 31)
- Origin: Martinsburg, West Virginia
- Genres: Folk rock, Americana
- Instruments: guitar, piano, harmonica, vocals, bass
- Years active: 2014–present
- Label: Blaster Records
- Website: www.christianlopezmusic.com

Christian Lopez (born August 1, 1995) is an American singer-songwriter and multi-instrumentalist from Martinsburg, West Virginia. He was also the front man and guitarist of the Christian Lopez Band. Beyond Lopez, band members as of 2023 include Dan Gallagher on bass, and Joey Antico on drums.

Lopez has released four albums and an EP in folk rock and Americana style. Americana Music Show wrote that Lopez's lyrics and delivery have "the earnestness and wide-open view of the world that we haven't seen since the early days of Paul Simon." The band tours frequently in the United States, and in 2015 Rolling Stone named Lopez "best newcomer" at the Americana Music Festival & Conference, with the article stating that he "packed so much kinetic energy into his set, and sliced so many strings, that he had to finish on a borrowed guitar."

He married actress Skyler Shaye on 10/10/22 in Santa Barbara, CA.

== Career ==
=== Early life and Pilot EP (1995–2014) ===
Lopez is originally from Martinsburg, West Virginia, and moved to Nashville, Tennessee at 18 years old. He started playing music at an early age, learning the piano at age 5 and guitar at age 9. He began songwriting in his early teenage years, and was touring before the age of 16. He was also a contestant on American Idol on both the 11th and 12th seasons, but was eliminated in the Hollywood rounds each time.

In 2013, Lopez signed a management agreement with Rock Ridge Music, and in early 2014 he signed a record deal with Blaster Records. Shortly thereafter, he recorded his first release, the five song EP Pilot, which was released in October 2014. Dave Cobb produced the release.

In 2014, Lopez was selected as one of the winners of the Belk Modern Musician Showcase talent search and invited to join Belk's 2014 "Modern Southern Music" tour. They performed at numerous concerts including shows by Zac Brown Band, Dave Matthews Band, on the Vans Warped Tour, Miranda Lambert, Brothers Osborne, and Marty Stuart.

=== Onward and touring (2015) ===
In May 2015, Lopez released his first full-length album Onward. Like his previous EP, it was produced by Dave Cobb (Sturgill Simpson, Jason Isbell, Chris Stapleton). Popmatters streamed the album on May 12, 2015.

From Onward, the track "Will I See You Again" received over 1 million Spotify streams, and the song "Leaving It Out" remained in the CMT Pure Country "12 Pack Countdown" for a number of consecutive weeks. Rolling Stone called the album "a plucky and occasionally subdued showcase of his Appalachia roots."

In 2015, Lopez participated in West Virginia's "Real" tourism campaign and was featured in a promotional video entitled "Real WV." "Will I See You Again" was used in a second spot entitled "Real Morgantown." Additionally, he has been invited to perform at 2015's Music Hall Of Fame Induction ceremony as well as the band's inaugural appearance at Mountain Stage.

=== Red Arrow (2017) ===
On September 22, 2017, Lopez released his second album entitled, Red Arrow, this time using producer Marshall Altman, known for his work with Marc Broussard and Frankie Ballard. Guests include Vince Gill's guitar on "Still on Its Feet," and The Milk Carton Kids Kenneth Pattengale's guitar and vocals on "Caramel." Rolling Stone said that Red Arrow "flies straight through multiple eras of rock, pop and country. Organic sounds are favored over electronics, while Lopez's versatile guitar playing provides a millennial take on everything from Eighties rock to timeless folk. Sly, generation-bridging vocals are the common thread, and as interest in Americana rises, Lopez could connect the dots for many young listeners."

The music magazine also earlier named Lopez "One of the 10 New Country Artists You Need To Know".

Among the 2017 tour dates, and just before the release of Red Arrow in September 2017, Lopez joined 300 acts on the bill of AmericanaFest in Nashville, once again receiving a "Best Things We Saw" title from Rolling Stone Country.

=== The Other Side (2021) ===
In 2021, he released his third album, The Other Side, produced by Robert Adam Stevenson, with 12 tracks. Singles from the album include, “Sip Of Mine” and "Who You Really Are"

=== Magdalena (2023) ===
On June 9, 2023, he released his fourth album, Magdalena. Singles from the album include, “Girl & A Gun" and "Harpers Ferry". Lopez recorded Magdalena isolated in the small New Mexican town of Magdalena, just west of Socorro, NM. With producer, Robert Adam Stevenson again at the helm, Lopez recorded all 9 songs in his adobe casita, sharing a co-production credit. Magdalena received critical acclaim and even earned Lopez his debut at The Grand Ole Opry.

== Discography ==
Year	Title	Format	Record label
October 14, 2014	Pilot	CD, digital download	Blaster Records
May 19, 2015	Onward	CD, digital download	Blaster Records
September 22, 2017	Red Arrow	CD, digital download	Blaster Records
October 8, 2021	The Other Side	CD, digital download	Blaster Records
June 9, 2023	Magdalena	CD, digital download	Firebird Music
January 26, 2024	I'm Not Alone	digital download	Firebird Music
