= Bill Dineen =

Canadian ice hockey player and coach

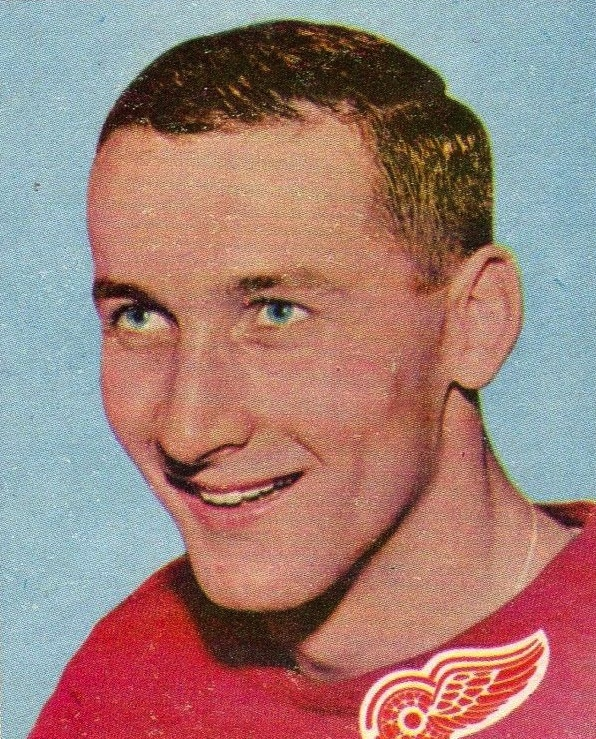
- Born: September 18, 1932 Arvida, Quebec, Canada
- Died: December 10, 2016 (aged 84) Queensbury, New York, U.S.
- Height: 5 ft 11 in (180 cm)
- Weight: 180 lb (82 kg; 12 st 12 lb)
- Position: Right wing
- Shot: Right
- Played for: Detroit Red Wings; Chicago Black Hawks
- Coached for: Houston Aeros; New England Whalers; Philadelphia Flyers
- Playing career: 1953–1971
- Coaching career: 1970–1993

William Patrick "Foxy" Dineen (September 18, 1932 – December 10, 2016) was a Canadian professional ice hockey player and head coach. He played in the National Hockey League (NHL) for the Detroit Red Wings and Chicago Black Hawks between 1953 and 1958. The rest of his career, which lasted from 1953 to 1971, was spent in the minor leagues. After his playing career Dineen became a coach and worked in the World Hockey Association from 1972 to 1979. He was the head coach for the Houston Aeros for all six seasons before coaching the New England Whalers for the 1978-79 season. The architect of a team in roster construction, Dineen's Aeros reached the playoffs in every season of their history and won the Avco World Trophy twice. Dineen won 318 games in the regular season and 44 in the playoffs, each of which being the most in WHA history.

He coached in the American Hockey League (AHL) in the 1980s, where he won two Calder Cups with the Adirondack Red Wings. He was hired to coach the Philadelphia Flyers of the NHL from 1991 to 1993. Throughout his career, Dineen was traded for Bob Bailey on three occasions.

== Playing career ==
He began his career by playing two seasons for the St. Michael's Majors of the OHL. He spent five years playing for the Detroit Red Wings from 1954-1958. He won the Stanley Cup twice with the team, in 1954 and 1955. He later played briefly for the Chicago Black Hawks. After 1958, however, he spent the rest of his playing career in the minor leagues with various teams including the Buffalo Bisons, Cleveland Barons, Rochester Americans, Quebec Aces, Seattle Totems, and the Denver Spurs.

== Coaching career ==
After his retirement as a player, Dineen went into coaching. He spent six years behind the bench of the Houston Aeros of the World Hockey Association—the entirety of the team's existence—where he coached Gordie Howe for four seasons and won two championships. After the Aeros disbanded, he was hired to coach the New England Whalers in 1978-79, but was fired late in the season. In six years with the Adirondack Red Wings he was twice named the American Hockey League's coach of the year and won two Calder Cup titles. He was later named head coach of the Philadelphia Flyers in 1992 where he got to coach his son Kevin. He was the oldest rookie coach in the history of the NHL. He was fired by the Flyers after 1993.

== Honours ==
In 2010, he was elected as an inaugural inductee into the World Hockey Association Hall of Fame.

He was portrayed by Martin Cummins in the 2013 television film Mr. Hockey: The Gordie Howe Story.

== Personal life and death ==
Three of his sons Gordon, Peter, and Kevin also played in the NHL. Bill Dineen died on December 10, 2016, in Queensbury, New York, at the age of 84.

== Career statistics ==
=== Regular season and playoffs ===
			Regular season					Playoffs
Season	Team	League	GP	G	A	Pts	PIM	GP	G	A	Pts	PIM
1948–49	Ottawa St. Pats	OCHL	—	—	—	—	—	—	—	—	—	—
1949–50	St. Michael's Majors	OHA	43	15	18	33	43	5	2	3	5	4
1950–51	St. Michael's Majors	OHA	45	25	26	51	50	—	—	—	—	—
1951–52	St. Michael's Majors	OHA	47	21	30	51	37	8	3	3	6	0
1952–53	St. Michael's Majors	OHA	55	27	20	47	63	17	13	7	20	18
1953–54	Detroit Red Wings	NHL	70	17	8	25	34	12	0	0	0	2
1954–55	Detroit Red Wings	NHL	69	10	9	19	36	11	0	1	1	8
1955–56	Detroit Red Wings	NHL	70	12	7	19	28	10	1	0	1	8
1956–57	Detroit Red Wings	NHL	51	6	7	13	12	4	0	0	0	0
1957–58	Detroit Red Wings	NHL	22	2	4	6	2	—	—	—	—	—
1957–58	Chicago Black Hawks	NHL	41	4	9	13	8	—	—	—	—	—
1958–59	Buffalo Bisons	AHL	59	8	19	27	17	11	3	5	8	10
1959–60	Buffalo Bisons	AHL	5	0	1	1	2	—	—	—	—	—
1959–60	Cleveland Barons	AHL	62	26	27	53	17	7	2	3	5	4
1960–61	Cleveland Barons	AHL	72	28	31	59	24	4	0	3	3	0
1961–62	Rochester Americans	AHL	70	19	19	38	20	2	0	0	0	2
1962–63	Quebec Aces	AHL	72	24	17	41	22	—	—	—	—	—
1963–64	Quebec Aces	AHL	61	27	25	52	26	9	3	3	6	0
1964–65	Seattle Totems	WHL	69	25	17	42	4	7	0	1	1	8
1965–66	Seattle Totems	WHL	71	23	16	39	10	—	—	—	—	—
1966–67	Seattle Totems	WHL	62	32	33	65	8	10	2	7	9	4
1967–68	Seattle Totems	WHL	72	28	33	61	10	9	3	6	9	2
1968–69	Seattle Totems	WHL	74	9	16	25	8	4	0	0	0	0
1969–70	Denver Spurs	WHL	51	10	8	18	4	—	—	—	—	—
1970–71	Denver Spurs	WHL	16	5	6	11	4	—	—	—	—	—
NHL totals			323	51	44	95	120	37	1	1	2	18

== Coaching record ==
Season	Team	League	Regular season						Post season
Season	Team	League	G	W	L	T	Pts	Division rank	Result
1972–73	Houston Aeros	WHA	78	39	35	4	82	2nd in West	Lost in Division Finals
1973–74	Houston Aeros	WHA	78	48	25	5	101	1st in West	Avco World Trophy Champions
1974–75	Houston Aeros	WHA	78	53	25	0	106	1st in West	Avco World Trophy Champions
1975–76	Houston Aeros	WHA	80	53	27	0	106	1st in West	Lost in Finals
1976–77	Houston Aeros	WHA	80	50	24	6	106	1st in West	Lost in Division Finals
1977–78	Houston Aeros	WHA	80	42	34	4	88	3rd in WHA	Lost in Semifinals
1978–79	New England Whalers	WHA	71	33	29	9	75	4th in WHA	Fired
1983–84	Adirondack Red Wings	AHL	80	37	29	14	88	2nd in Northern Division	Lost in Quarterfinals
1984–85	Adirondack Red Wings	AHL	80	35	37	8	78	5th in Northern Division	Missed Playoffs
1985–86	Adirondack Red Wings	AHL	80	41	31	8	90	1st in Northern Division	Calder Cup Champions
1986–87	Adirondack Red Wings	AHL	80	44	31	5	93	2nd in Northern Division	Lost in Semifinals
1987–88	Adirondack Red Wings	AHL	80	42	27	11	99	3rd in Southern Division	Lost in Semifinals
1988–89	Adirondack Red Wings	AHL	80	47	27	6	100	1st in Southern Division	Calder Cup Champions
1991–92	Philadelphia Flyers	NHL	56	24	23	9	57	6th in Patrick	Missed Playoffs
1992–93	Philadelphia Flyers	NHL	84	36	37	11	83	5th in Patrick	Missed Playoffs
WHA Totals			545	318	199	28	664		
NHL Totals			140	60	60	20	140		

Preceded by Paul Holmgren	Head coach of the Philadelphia Flyers; 1992–93	Succeeded by Terry Simpson
Preceded by Harry Neale	Head coach of the New England Whalers; 1978–79	Succeeded by Don Blackburn
