= Movie Night in Canada =

Replacement for Hockey Night in Canada

- Genre: Feature films
- Presented by: Ron MacLean (2004–05)
- Country of origin: Canada

Original release
- Network: CBC Television
- Release: October 16, 2004 – June 2005
- Release: March 14, 2020 – January 9, 2021

Movie Night in Canada is a film programming block that occasionally aired on CBC Television. The branding has been used on two occasions by the CBC as replacement programming for its Saturday-night lineup during major interruptions of the National Hockey League which prevented the regular broadcast of the block's namesake, Hockey Night in Canada.

The branding was first used during the 2004–05 NHL lockout, airing a lineup of three films per week. Hockey Night host Ron MacLean presented wraparound segments on location during the block, highlighting amateur and junior hockey teams across the country. In March 2020, following the suspension of the season due to the COVID-19 pandemic, CBC revived the branding with a focus on Canadian films.

== 2004–05 ==
The program first ran in 2004 during the 2004–05 NHL lockout, premiering on October 16 with a triple bill of Dinosaur, Raiders of the Lost Ark and Jaws. The programming strategy in this era was to run a family film at 7 p.m., a blockbuster film at 9 p.m. and an "edgier" film at 11 p.m. To "keep the hockey spirit alive", Hockey Night in Canada host Ron MacLean presented short introductions for each film, first taped in an empty hockey arena and later travelling across Canada to highlight and publicize amateur and junior hockey teams that were still playing. The second week included The Princess Diaries at 7, Indiana Jones and the Temple of Doom at 9, and Blazing Saddles at 11; later lineups included a golf-themed bill of The Legend of Bagger Vance, Tin Cup and Happy Gilmore on November 20.

The series attracted ratings roughly equal to regular Hockey Night in Canada broadcasts. It aired weekly until December 18, and then took a hiatus for Christmas programming, before returning in January 2005. With the lockout's lack of resolution beginning to cast doubt on whether the 2005–06 NHL season would happen, the CBC began to send signals in February 2005 that it would continue to buy and schedule movies if the next hockey season was also cancelled. By the time a deal was reached between the NHL and the players in July 2005, the CBC was also affected by a labour dispute with its own technicians, although that was resolved in time for the return of Hockey Night in Canada when the NHL season began in the fall.

The block's reliance on American films in this era was criticized by Friends of Canadian Broadcasting for significantly reducing the amount of Canadian content broadcast by the network during its run.

== 2020 ==
The brand was revived in March 2020 when the 2019–20 NHL season was suspended as a result of the COVID-19 pandemic, with a lineup focusing on Canadian films. It launched on March 14, 2020, with the double bill of Bon Cop, Bad Cop and Bon Cop, Bad Cop 2.

After June 20, the series started airing only a single film at 10 p.m. each week, with other programming taking up the first half of the former time slot. In the week of June 27, the CBC broadcast the international Global Goal: Unite for Our Future special, while in later weeks the 7-10 p.m. block was taken up by repeat broadcasts of CBC documentary programming such as The Nature of Things, CBC Docs POV and Taken.

When the NHL announced that the 2020 Stanley Cup playoffs would begin on August 1, the Movie Night in Canada block went on hiatus following the July 25 broadcast and returned on October 3 after the playoffs ended five days prior; in late November, the programming shifted to air primarily Christmas-themed films, briefly returning to general theatrical films after Christmas until ending in January 2021 to accommodate the return of Hockey Night in Canada for the 2020–21 NHL season.

The CBC has continued to air Canadian films on Saturday evenings during the summer, although the block is no longer using the Movie Night in Canada branding.

=== Films ===
Date	Films
March 14	Bon Cop, Bad Cop, Bon Cop, Bad Cop 2
March 21	Mr. Hockey: The Gordie Howe Story, Goalie
March 28	Hyena Road, The Right Kind of Wrong
April 4	Race, Across the Line
April 11	Hector and the Search for Happiness, Dr. Cabbie
April 18	The Breadwinner, Maudie
April 25	Still Mine, Brooklyn
May 2	Jean of the Joneses, Picture Day
May 9	The Adventure Club, Into the Forest
May 16	The Journey Home, Two Lovers and a Bear
May 23	Milton's Secret, Remember
May 30	Dr. Cabbie, Beeba Boys
June 6	Kayak to Klemtu, Mouthpiece
June 13	An Audience of Chairs, Octavio Is Dead!
June 20	Chaakapesh, Giant Little Ones, Rhymes for Young Ghouls
June 27	The Grizzlies
July 4	The Body Remembers When the World Broke Open
July 11	Hector and the Search for Happiness
July 18	Angelique's Isle
July 25	The Grand Seduction
October 3	Disappearance at Clifton Hill, I'll Follow You Down
October 10	Clara, The Animal Project
October 17	American Woman, Mean Dreams
October 24	Red Snow, Unclaimed
October 31	Incendies
November 7	Trouble in the Garden, I Killed My Mother
November 14	Mommy
November 21	The Man Who Invented Christmas, Window Wonderland
November 28	Christmas Stars, Country Christmas Album
December 5	Once Upon a Murdoch Christmas, A Christmas Fury
December 12	A Heartland Christmas, Rock 'n Roll Christmas
December 19	The Man Who Invented Christmas
December 26	Window Wonderland, Across the Line
January 2	Race, Milton's Secret
January 9	The Adventure Club, Dr. Cabbie
