= Andrew Herr =

Canadian actor (born 1991)

- Born: May 25, 1991 (age 35); London, Ontario, Canada
- Occupation: Actor
- Years active: 2013–present

Andrew Herr (born May 25, 1991) is a Canadian actor. He is best known for his starring role as Jonesy on the television sitcom Letterkenny (2016–2023).

== Early life ==
Herr was born in London, Ontario, but his family eventually moved to St. George, Ontario.He attend St Johns College in Brantford, Ontario before moving to Kingston, Ontario He grew up playing ice hockey, but his dreams of playing the sport professionally faded over the years. He later said that his time playing hockey had an impact on his acting career and that growing up, he knew hockey players who were similar to the character he eventually went on to play in Letterkenny. When Herr was going into his final year of high school, his father got a new job, and his family had to move to Kingston, Ontario, where he attended Regiopolis-Notre Dame Catholic Secondary School (from which he graduated). Among other activities he picked up in his new high school, he decided to try out for a role in a local production of Daniel MacIvor's play Never Swim Alone, to be performed at the Sears Drama Festival. It was through this play that he found his passion for acting.

== College and career ==
Herr sought to pursue a career in acting, and he was accepted to the theater program at Toronto Metropolitan University (then called Ryerson University). However, he instead chose to move to Vancouver to attend the University of British Columbia (UBC), where after a year, he would have the opportunity to audition for their prestigious theater program. He was not chosen for the program. While at UBC, Herr became roommates with Dylan Playfair, with whom he appeared in the television film Mr. Hockey: The Gordie Howe Story. The two of them would eventually co-star as best friends in Letterkenny. After his first year at UBC, Herr took a year off to attend the Vancouver Media Arts Institute; he auditioned for the "Mr. Hockey" biopic after that. During his time at UBC, Herr became a member of the Sigma Chi fraternity.

While living in Vancouver, Herr joined a men's league hockey team, where he met Jared Keeso. Keeso cast Herr and Playfair as the "hockey players" in the series of web skits he was creating, "Letterkenny Problems." This series eventually was picked up by Crave and became the show Letterkenny.

== Filmography ==
=== Film ===
Year	Title	Role	Notes
2015	12 Rounds 3: Lockdown	Young Kid	
2016	Mostly Ghostly: One Night in Doom House	Aaron Carmichael	Direct-to-DVD
2017	Rememory	Wendy's Male Lover	
2017	Goon: Last of the Enforcers	Finch	
2017	Bigger Fatter Liar	Highcroft	
2017	Adventures in Public School	BDC	
2018	Status Update	Oliver	

=== Television ===
Year	Title	Role	Notes
2013	Mr. Hockey: The Gordie Howe Story	Mark Howe	TV film
2013	A Sister's Nightmare	Josh	TV film
2014	Tide Waters	Andy	Episode: "Washed Up: Part 2"
2014	Zapped	Ogre Boy	TV film
2014	The Unauthorized Saved by the Bell Story	Brian Austin Green	TV film
2015	The Dollanganger Saga	Lance	Episode: "Seeds of Yesterday"
2016–2023	Letterkenny	Jonesy	81 episodes
2017	Story of a Girl	Jason	TV film
