= Nathan Dales =

Canadian actor

Nathan Dales is a Canadian actor from Calgary, Alberta. He is most noted for his starring role as Daryl in Letterkenny, for which he was a Canadian Screen Award nominee for Best Supporting Actor in a Comedy Series at the 5th Canadian Screen Awards in 2017.

A graduate of the American Academy of Dramatic Arts, he has also had roles in the television series Tower Prep and The Indian Detective, and the films Goon: Last of the Enforcers (2017), The Broken Hearts Gallery (2020), and Resident Evil: Welcome to Raccoon City (2021).

== Filmography ==
=== Film ===
Year	Title	Role	Notes
2017	Goon: Last of the Enforcers	Petr	
2020	The Broken Hearts Gallery	Jeff	
2021	Resident Evil: Welcome to Raccoon City	Vickers	

=== Television ===
Year	Title	Role	Notes
2010	Tower Prep	Security Monitor	6 episodes
2012	Fringe	Loyalist Guard #2	Episode: "The Bullet That Saved the World"
2013	King & Maxwell	Doyle Ross	Episode: "Wild Card"
2015	iZombie	EMT	Episode: "Pilot"
2015	Backstrom	Timothy Fitch	Episode: "I Like to Watch"
2015	Supernatural	Seth / Oskar	2 episodes
2016–2023	Letterkenny	Daryl	74 episodes
2017	The Indian Detective	Agent Shamansky	4 episodes
2019	Littlekenny	Young Daryl	5 episodes
2025	Revival	Deputy McCray	6 episodes
