= Dangerous Game: The Legacy Murders =

- Directed by: Sean McNamara
- Written by: Brian Buccellato
- Starring: Jonathan Rhys Meyers; Will Sasso; Jon Voight; Laura Mennell; Megan Charpentier; Kaya Coleman; Dylan Playfair; Bradley Stryker; Skyler Shaye
- Release date: October 21, 2022
- Running time: 96 minutes
- Country: Canada
- Language: English

Dangerous Game: The Legacy Murders is a 2022 Canadian mystery horror thriller film written by Brian Buccellato, directed by Sean McNamara and starring Jonathan Rhys Meyers, Will Sasso, Jon Voight, Laura Mennell, Megan Charpentier, Kaya Coleman, Dylan Playfair, Bradley Stryker and Skyler Shaye.

== Cast ==
- Jonathan Rhys Meyers as Kyle
- Will Sasso as Alec Betts
- Jon Voight as Ellison Betts
- Laura Mennell as Marie Betts
- Megan Charpentier as Livie Betts
- Skyler Shaye as Joy
- Kaya Coleman as Tara
- Dylan Playfair as Cameron Betts
- Bradley Stryker as Burnham

== Release ==
The film was released on October 21, 2022.

== Reception ==
The film has a 0% rating on Rotten Tomatoes based on seven reviews. Ronak Kotecha of The Times of India awarded the film one and a half stars out of five. Jeffrey M. Anderson of Common Sense Media awarded the film one star out of five.
