= Skyler Shaye =

American actress

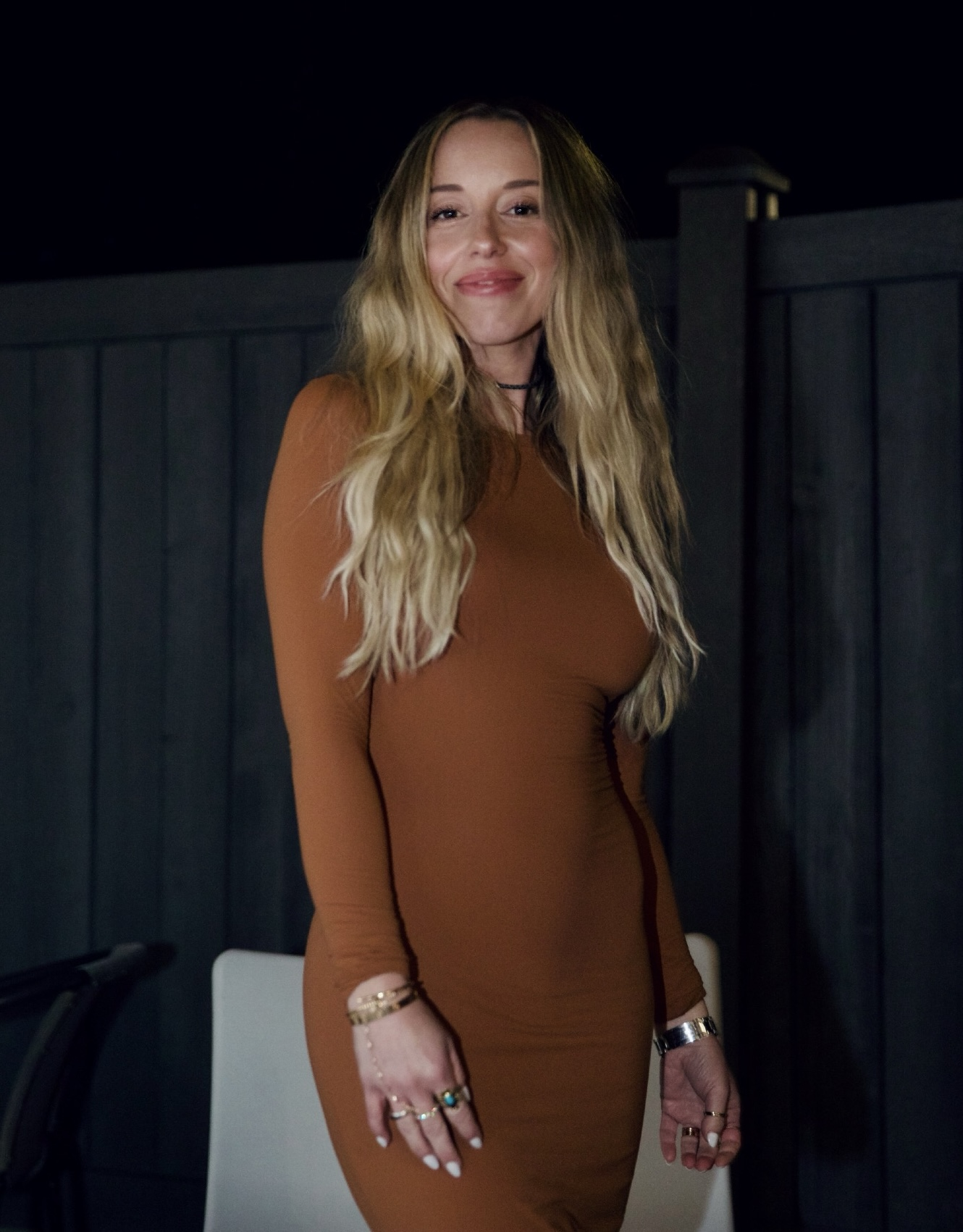
- Shaye in 2023
- Born: Skyler Anna Shuster; October 14, 1986 (age 40); Los Angeles, California, US
- Occupation: Actress
- Years active: 1994–present
- Spouse: Christian Lopez (m. 2022)

Skyler Shaye (born October 14, 1986) is an American actress. She is best known for her role as Kylie in Superbabies: Baby Geniuses 2 (2004) and as Cloe in Bratz: The Movie (2007).

== Career ==
=== Career beginnings ===
Shaye began her career as a child actress and landed her first role in The Tin Soldier (1998), a television film directed by her godfather, actor Jon Voight. She had a recurring role as Sutton Ramsey in The WB's comedy series Family Affair. In 2005, she portrayed Katie Bryce, Meredith Grey's first patient, in ABC's medical drama series Grey's Anatomy in the episode "A Hard Day's Night". She reprised her role as Katie Bryce in the series for two more episodes in 2016 and 2019. In 2006, she had guest roles in Criminal Minds and Veronica Mars. Shaye landed the role of Cloe in comedy film Bratz (2007), based on the Bratz line of dolls. She stated in an interview with American Cheerleader that "Cloe is a great soccer player, but she's doing it so that she can get a college scholarship. Deep down, she wants to be a filmmaker, and she never puts down her video camera. [In real life] I'm very athletic and love to run, hike and dance." She played one of the main roles alongside Nathalia Ramos, Logan Browning, and Janel Parrish.

Beside The Tin Soldier (1998), alongside Jon Voight she played Lulu in Deadly Lessons (2006), Megan in Beyond (2012), Cindy in Showtime original series Ray Donovan (2015), and Lynn Landsburg in two Hallmark Movies & Mysteries original films JL Ranch (2016) and JL Family Ranch: The Wedding Gift (2020).

== Personal life ==
Shaye started dating musician Christian Lopez in 2017. They married on October 10, 2022.

== Filmography ==
Film
Year	Title	Role	Notes
1994	Ava's Magical Adventure	Little Girl	
1995	The Whispering	Ghost Girl	
1998	The Modern Adventures of Tom Sawyer	Sky	
2000	The Million Dollar Kid	Girl	Uncredited
2003	Manhood	Lily	
2004	Superbabies: Baby Geniuses 2	Kylie Bobbins	
2005	Berkeley	Blonde at Library	
2006	The Legend of Simon Conjurer	Lulu	
2007	Bratz: The Movie	Cloe	Also as performer: "Bratitude" and "Open Eyes"
2011	Childhood Sweethearts	Young Dorothy	Short film
2012	It Was Love, Now it's War	The Lover	Short film
2012	Beyond	Megan	
2013	Baby Geniuses and the Mystery of the Crown Jewels	Kylie Bobbins	Direct-to-video film
2014	Baby Geniuses and the Treasures of Egypt	Kylie Bobbins	Direct-to-video film
2015	Baby Geniuses and the Space Baby	Kylie Bobbins	Direct-to-video film
2022	Dangerous Game: The Legacy Murders	Joy	

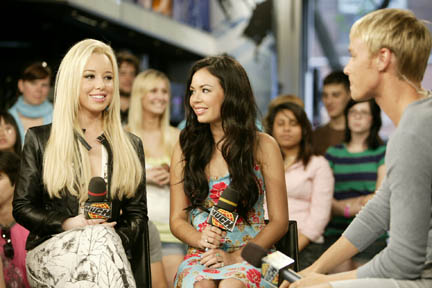
Shaye and Janel Parrish at MuchMusic in 2007.

Television
Year	Title	Role	Notes
1995	The Tin Soldier	Little Girl	Television film
1999	Boys Will Be Boys	Samantha	Television film
2002	Family Affair	Sutton Ramsey	4 episodes
2005, 2016, 2019	Grey's Anatomy	Katie Bryce	Episodes: "A Hard Day's Night", "My Next Life", "My Shot"
2006	Criminal Minds	Ingrid Greisen	Episode: "The Tribe"
2006	Veronica Mars	Natalie Landers	Episode: "I Am God"
2013–15	Baby Geniuses Television Series	Kylie	
2015	Ray Donovan	Cindy	7 episodes
2016	J.L. Family Ranch	Lynn Landsburg	Hallmark Movies & Mysteries original film
2020	J.L. Family Ranch: The Wedding Gift	Lynn Landsburg	Hallmark Movies & Mysteries original film
