= Mr. Hockey: The Gordie Howe Story =

2013 ice hockey biography film

- Film poster
- Genre: Biographical drama; Sports drama
- Written by: Malcolm MacRury
- Directed by: Andy Mikita
- Starring: Michael Shanks; Kathleen Robertson; Martin Cummins
- Music by: James Jandrisch
- Countries of origin: Canada; United States
- Original language: English

Production
- Executive producers: Howard Baldwin; Karen Baldwin; William J. Immerman; Mike Ilitch Jr.; Ian Dimerman; Karyn Edwards; Shawn Williamson; Stephen Hegyes
- Producers: Brendan Ferguson; Brendon Sawatzky
- Cinematography: James Alfred Menard
- Editor: Jason Dale
- Running time: 87 minutes
- Production companies: Brightlight Pictures; Mike Ilitch Jr Productions

Original release
- Network: CBC Television
- Release: 28 April 2013
- Network: Hallmark Channel
- Release: 4 May 2013

Mr. Hockey: The Gordie Howe Story is a 2013 biographical sports drama film. (Note: This article's sources categorize the TV movie as a biopic (biographical film), hockey or sports biography, and drama.) It was directed by Andy Mikita and written by Malcolm MacRury. The film focuses on the 1973–74 World Hockey Association (WHA) season, when ice hockey legend Gordie Howe returned from retirement to play for the Houston Aeros alongside his sons, rookies Mark and Marty Howe; his wife, Colleen, served as agent for all three.

The film stars Michael Shanks as Gordie, Kathleen Robertson as Colleen and Martin Cummins as Aeros coach Bill Dineen, with Lochlyn Munro, Dylan Playfair, Andrew Herr and Donnelly Rhodes in supporting roles. The film was a co-production between companies of Canada and the United States. It premiered on 28 April 2013 on CBC Television and 4 May on Hallmark Channel.

== Synopsis ==
Grainy black-and-white television coverage shows Gordie Howe scoring for the Detroit Red Wings of the National Hockey League (NHL), described by a commentator as "unstoppable", with numerous records for scoring and games played. He retires in 1971 after a 25-year NHL career and becomes a team executive with little authority.

Two years later, Gordie's sons Mark and Marty are playing junior hockey for the Toronto Marlboros, a former farm team for the Toronto Maple Leafs under common ownership. They help the team win the Memorial Cup and Mark is named most valuable player (MVP) of the tournament. However, they are too young to join the NHL, and Colleen suggests that the new World Hockey Association (WHA) take advantage.

At the first WHA amateur draft, Mark is selected as the first draft pick for the Houston Aeros by family friend and Aeros coach Bill "Foxy" Dineen. Marty is also drafted by the team; each is offered a $100,000 contract, which Gordie notes is more than he earned in 25 years playing for the Red Wings. (Note: In 1972, professional hockey players had average salaries of $25,000, far below baseball, basketball or football players; minor league players were paid half of that.) Harold Ballard, majority owner of the Maple Leafs, is incensed and organizes his colleagues. Bruce Norris, owner of the Red Wings, offers Gordie more involvement in the team's operations but wants him to quash his sons' WHA contracts, threatening that they will never play in the NHL.

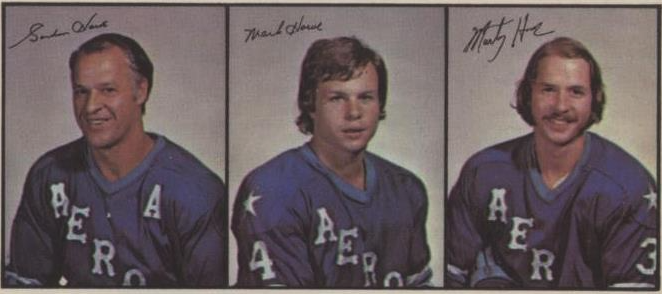
Gordie, Mark and Marty Howe in Aeros jerseys, 1974

Gordie discusses with Colleen his return to professional hockey and moving the family to Houston. She has concerns about him playing in his mid-forties, but he had always dreamed of playing professionally with the boys and "starting them off right". Colleen tells the Aeros manager that the three Howes will bring unprecedented publicity to the WHA, and insists Gordie be paid commensurate with the career he's leaving. It is a televised event when the three sign their contracts. Notably slower than the other prospects, Gordie undertakes intensive training to make the lineup.

In their first exhibition game with the Winnipeg Jets, Gordie takes the puck from Bobby Hull and scores, then acts as an enforcer when Marty is hit. The boys don't want their father fighting their battles for them, particularly as teammates haze them to test their mettle. They stand up for themselves by exploiting a teammate's phobia.

The boys are afraid that their father will become hurt while Gordie worries about the boys having so much money. Marty starts seeing girlfriend Mary James and helps assistant coach Harvey when he struggles with his sobriety. Mark makes an ill-advised comment about his father "playing dirty" which is published in a Sports Illustrated cover story on Gordie, incensing him. Mark later apologizes, explaining that he meant his father was an honourable "policeman" (Note: "Policeman" is a term used for some enforcers who police hockey's unwritten code of conduct, dealing punishment for transgressions. These punishments act as a deterrent to encourage fair play. An all-rounder, Gordie Howe was known for scoring and fighting, giving rise to the term Gordie Howe hat trick for scoring a goal, an assist, and being involved in a fight in the same game.) like Dirty Harry. (Note: Earlier in the film, a character compared Gordie to Clint Eastwood, the actor who played Dirty Harry. The third Dirty Harry movie was titled The Enforcer.)

Late in the season, Gordie suffers a hairline fracture in his leg. While Gordie recuperates at home on his forty-sixth birthday, his scoring lead for the WHA season is overtaken. He becomes dejected but Colleen encourages him with a bigger achievement: to win a championship alongside his sons. Meanwhile, Harvey loses his job due to his alcoholism and counsels Marty to seize every moment because sports careers can end suddenly. Encountering Norris at an airport, the boys say that even if they can't play in the NHL, it's been worth it to play a season with the greatest Red Wing in history.

In the WHA playoffs, the rival team in the finals attempts to unnerve Gordie by bringing in a trash-talking goon from the minor leagues and putting a rocking chair with Gordie's number on the ice. Gordie makes a rare dressing room speech, recalling his first advice about enjoying the game and thanking everyone for making the past season special and the most enjoyable one he has had. They win the championship; Gordie wins MVP, and Mark wins rookie of the year. Gordie thanks Colleen for being the best teammate he has ever had.

The film jumps to 1980 Hockey Night in Canada coverage of the NHL All-Star Game in Detroit. The NHL–WHA merger in 1979 has brought all the top players into one league. Gordie, now playing for the Hartford Whalers in his fifth decade as a professional player, skates onto the ice and receives a four-minute standing ovation.

== Cast ==
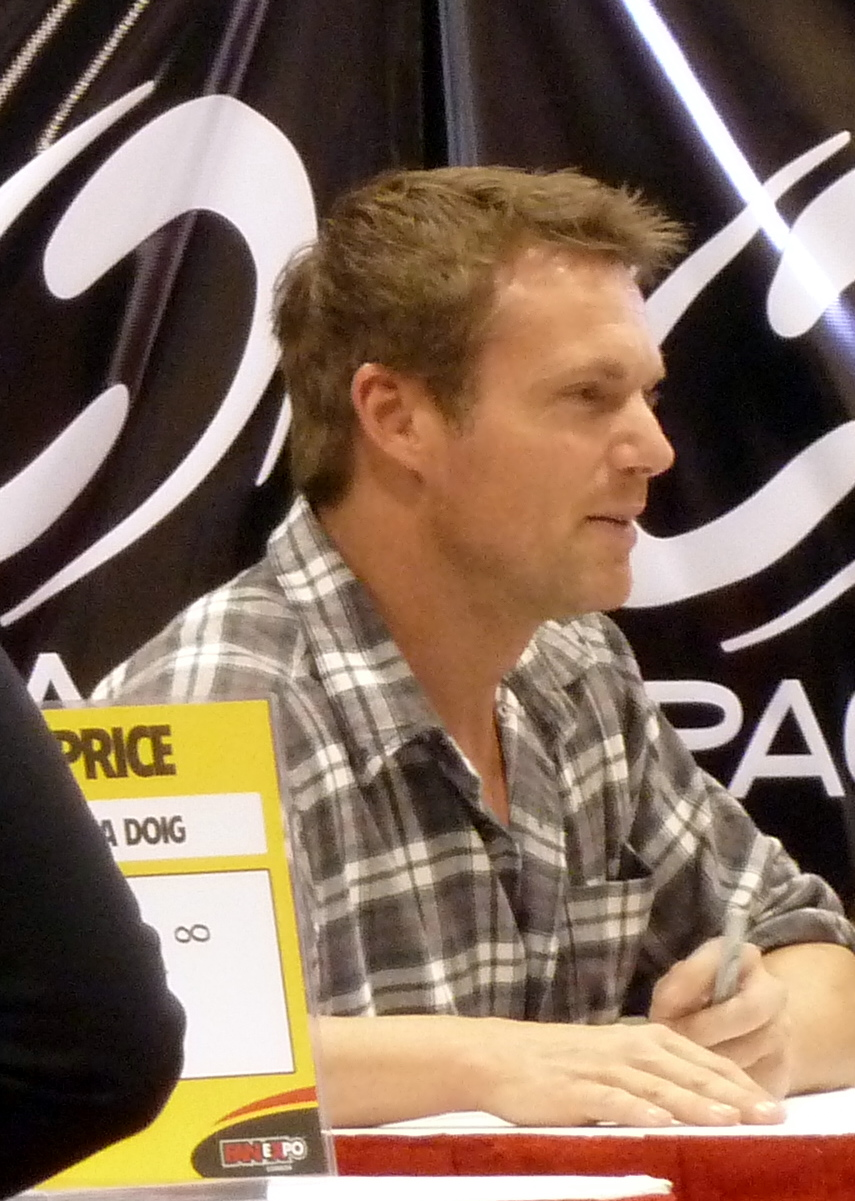
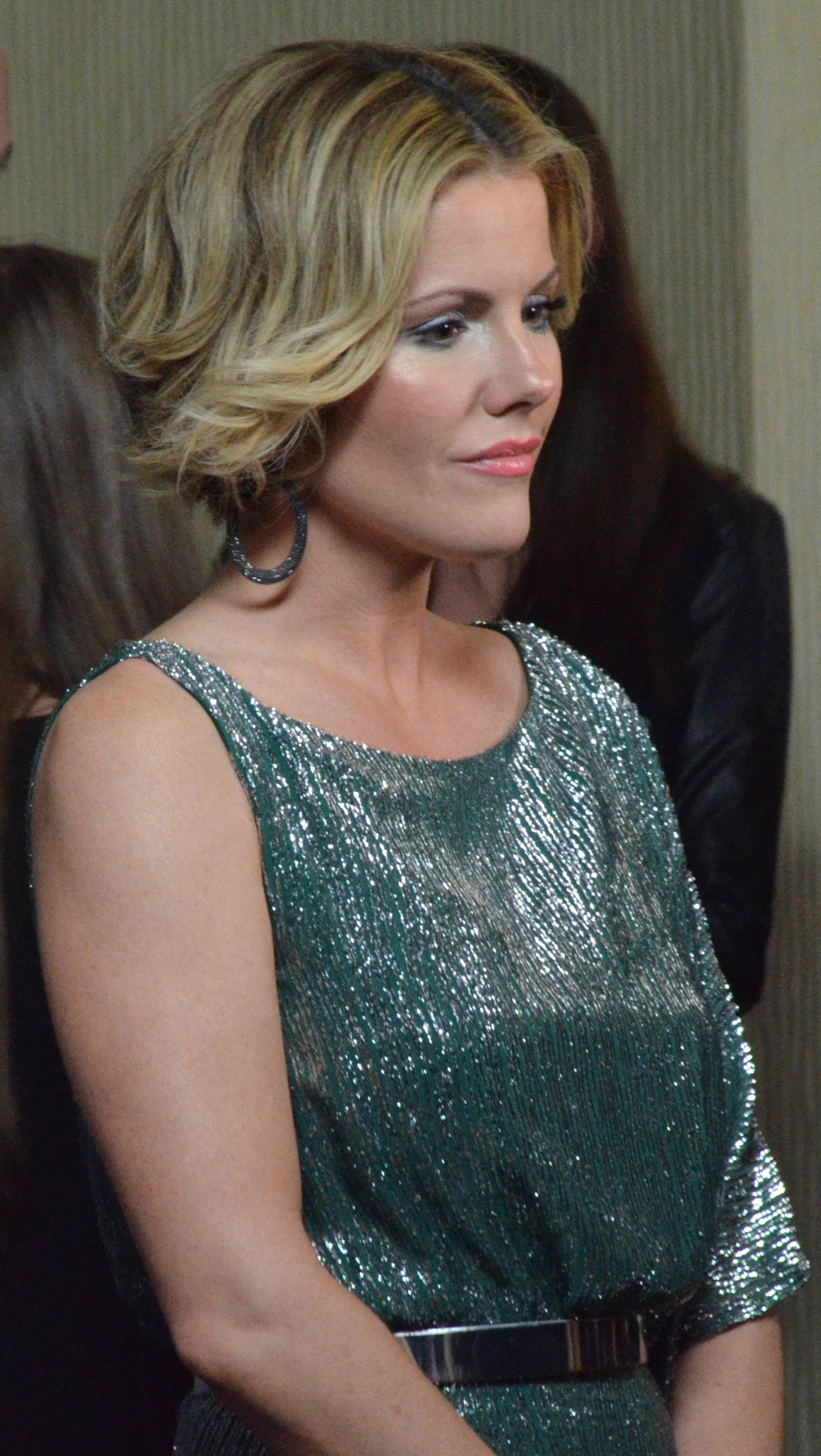
Shanks and Robertson, pictured in 2011 and 2014, respectively
- Michael Shanks as Gordie Howe
- Kathleen Robertson as Colleen Howe
- Martin Cummins as Bill "Foxy" Dineen, Aeros coach
- Dylan Playfair as Marty Howe, defenceman
- Andrew Herr as Mark Howe
- Emma Grabinsky as Cathy Howe
- Ali Tataryn as Mary James, Marty's girlfriend
- Andrew Kavadas as Doug Harvey, former NHL star and assistant coach for the Aeros
- Teach Grant as Don "Smokey" McLeod, Aeros goaltender
- Lochlyn Munro as Bobby Hull, Winnipeg Jets player
- Donnelly Rhodes as NHL Lawyer
- Graham Mayes as Murray Howe, a younger son
- Paul Magel as Ted Taylor, Aeros player
- Karl Thordarson as Jack Stanfield, Aeros player
- Brad Turner as John Schella, Aeros defenceman
- Adam Hurtig as Jim Smith
- Erik Berg as Tommy, Cathy's boyfriend
- Bryan Clark as Minnesota Enforcer
- Brock Couch as Mike Walton, centre for the Minnesota Fighting Saints
- Gordon Tanner as Ted Lindsay, a retired Red Wings player and organizer for the National Hockey League Players' Association
- Gio Tropea as Former NHL Player
- Tom Anniko as Bruce Norris, owner of the Detroit Red Wings
- R. J. Adams (uncredited) as Harold Ballard, owner of the Maple Leafs

== Development and casting ==
Mr. Hockey: The Gordie Howe Story was written by Malcolm MacRury and directed by Andy Mikita. MacRury had previously co-written the 2006 hockey miniseries Canada Russia '72. Development was supervised by Diane Boehme of Toronto-based EBTV. Gordie, Mark and Marty Howe provided guidance in the development of the film, making sure that it was accurate. Mark and Marty were more involved in this process, having more vivid recollections of events than their father.

Graham Rockingham wrote in The Hamilton Spectator that there were on-ice auditions for the actors portraying hockey players. However, Herr stated that he was only auditioned for his acting skills, noting "As soon as they found out I played junior hockey, I don't think they were too concerned." Herr, Playfair and Shanks had each played junior hockey in Canada. Shanks played as a defenceman in junior hockey until he was 20 while Herr had played a season for each of the Gananoque Islanders and the Napanee Raiders in eastern Ontario and Playfair had played in Western Canada.

Shanks sought a role in the biopic when he heard its filming would coincide with a break of his then-current series, Saving Hope. His agent initially told him that no parts were available but Shanks later received an offer from Mikita for the title role. Shanks had played hockey with Mikita on the set of Stargate: SG1 (Note: Shanks played for the Stargate hockey team in an informal celebrity league.) and MacRury was co-creator of Saving Hope.

While playing competitively, Shanks stated that he never backed down from fights and in that respect felt a connection with Gordie. (Note: Mikita apparently said Shanks was "a bit of an ass on the ice" and Herr confirmed that Shanks has "sharp elbows on the ice".) Shanks had not played hockey for five years while raising a family and had five weeks to train. He played pick-up hockey three times a week and spent four hours a day on inline skates and lifting weights. He focused on stick handling and learned to shoot with either hand. (Note: Gordie Howe was ambidextrous and could shoot from either side.) He said in an interview that he'd "rather be a pro hockey player than an actor" and that the role was a chance to experience that dream.

Prior to filming, Herr and Playfair conducted research and had conversations with Mark and Matty Howe to inform their performances. Shanks watched interviews of Howe to learn his mannerisms and wore custom dentures to help simulate Gordie's lisp. (Note: Shanks stated that he tried to hide his hands, which were much smaller than Gordie's.) However, Shanks avoided contact with the Howes so that he wouldn't feel himself under the pressure of their expectations. Robertson likewise studied Colleen and was moved by the "unbelievable marriage" full of sweetness and respect, and how involved Colleen was in the others' professional careers, as the first female agent in professional sports.

== Production ==
Shawn Williamson and Stephen Hegyes of Vancouver-based Brightlight Pictures produced the film, and Ian Dimmerman of Inferno Pictures co-produced it for the CBC. Executive producers included Howard Baldwin and Karen Baldwin of Baldwin Entertainment Group and William J. Immerman of RSVP Entertainment, alongside associate producers Mike Ilitch Jr., Brendon Sawatzky, and Brendan Ferguson. Howard Baldwin was owner of the Hartford Whalers, while Ilitch's father, Mike Ilitch, had bought the Red Wings from the Norris family in 1982.

The production received a total of $2,014,509 (Note: The Canadian Media Fund provided production incentives of $141,428 for British Columbia and $271,083 for Manitoba, and a $1,601,998 commitment for performance envelope.) in funding from the Canadian Media Fund. Additional financial assistance was provided by Manitoba Film & Music and the government of Manitoba.

Filming began in Winnipeg, Manitoba, on 28 August 2012, and concluded in September after about a month of shooting in the city. Hockey scenes were filmed in 12-hour overnight shoots overseen by production consultant Billy Keane. The sports scenes had to be rehearsed and performed at a reduced speed so that the camera could capture the action. All of the extras playing hockey were American Hockey League athletes.

Herr noted difficulty in playing hockey with 1970s equipment, particularly the long-bladed tube skates. (Note: Tube skates hold the steel blade in an aluminum tube connected to the shoe by tubular supports, invented c. 1900. These were standard until new materials available in the mid-1970s to 1980s allowed for lighter hockey skates with better ankle support.) According to Robertson, Herr's feet were left "bloody [and] ripped apart". Unwinding after the long on-ice shoots, Shanks said that they'd "just sit in the dressing room, drink beer, act like a bunch of morons and generally have fun."

Robertson stated that her trickiest scene was having to explain the offside rule, as she did not come from a hockey household and did not know the finer points of the sport.

The film begins and ends with archival footage of Gordie Howe, emphasizing that his story and accomplishments are real.

== Release ==
The film was dedicated to Colleen Howe, who had died in 2009.

The film premiered on 28 April 2013 on CBC Television in Canada and 4 May 2013 on Hallmark Channel in the United States. The hockey biography was considered an unusual choice for Hallmark, which mainly broadcasts romantic stories. The film was released on DVD and two-disc Blu-ray in October 2013.

On 21 March 2020, the film was rebroadcast on CBC's Movie Night in Canada, its temporary replacement for Hockey Night in Canada during the NHL shutdown in the COVID-19 pandemic.

== Reception ==
=== Critical response ===
John Doyle of The Globe and Mail called it "a well-told, engrossing movie that has fine performances". He found that the core of the movie was the family's dynamic and their concerns and aspirations for each other. In a review for Newsday, Diane Werts recommended it as a family-friendly sports film with a love story. The Detroit Free Press found that, while not up to the brutal realism of Slap Shot, it provided "entertaining family viewing" with liveliness and humour. David Hinckley's review for the New York Daily News called it an "inspiring [and] satisfying" story of an athlete whose focus and proficiency at his sport was overshot by his love for family, while Douglas King's review for Library Journal, found it to be a formulaic sports movie with themes of perseverance. Brad Oswald of the Winnipeg Free Press felt that the story lost its pace with characters who were nice but uninteresting people.

Werts was particularly taken with how in the film Colleen Howe manages events to give her men the opportunity to succeed. Graham Rockingham of The Hamilton Spectator likewise felt that Robertson's portrayal of Colleen drove the plot and Doyle praised the performances of both Robertson and Shanks.

Oswald found that the film's focus on a single year made it a footnote to Howe's life's story, but Hinckley felt this focus was an apt decision and a review in The Commercial Appeal stated that the film tried to tell too many stories at once. Oswald also felt the sports scenes were "cartoonish silliness" but Rockingham found them realistic and the Detroit Free Press noted them as one of the film's strengths.

The Commercial Appeal praised the production's set design, wardrobe and makeup, which captured "the shaggy end of the early 1970s". However, Oswald felt that this was "over the top ... kitsch".

=== Nominations and awards ===
The film received four nominations in the TV Movie categories at the 2nd Canadian Screen Awards: Best TV Movie, Best Lead Actor, Best Lead Actress and Best Direction. It was also nominated for 12 Leo Awards, winning 8.

The Canadian Media Fund stated that among the English-language dramas it supported, Mr. Hockey was in the top four for recognitions received in 2014–15 awards season.

Award	Category	Recipients	Result	Ref.
2nd Canadian Screen Awards	Best Dramatic Mini-Series or TV Movie	Brendon Sawatzky, Ian Dimerman, Karyn Edwards, Shawn Williamson, Stephen Hegyes	Nominated	
2nd Canadian Screen Awards	Lead actor, television film or miniseries	Michael Shanks	Nominated	
2nd Canadian Screen Awards	Lead actress, television film or miniseries	Kathleen Robertson	Nominated	
2nd Canadian Screen Awards	Best Direction, Dramatic Program or Miniseries	Andy Mikita	Nominated	
2014 Leo Awards	Best Television Movie	Mr. Hockey: The Gordie Howe Story	Won	
2014 Leo Awards	Best Lead Performance, Male, TV Movie	Michael Shanks	Won	
2014 Leo Awards	Best Lead Performance, Female, TV Movie	Kathleen Robertson	Won	
2014 Leo Awards	Best Supporting Performance, Male, TV Movie	Dylan Playfair	Won	
2014 Leo Awards	Best Direction, TV Movie	Andy Mikita	Nominated	
2014 Leo Awards	Best Screenwriting, TV Movie	Malcom MacRury	Nominated	
2014 Leo Awards	Best Cinematography, TV Movie	James Alfred Menard	Won	
2014 Leo Awards	Best Picture Editing, TV Movie	Jason Dale	Nominated	
2014 Leo Awards	Best Overall Sound, TV Movie	Kelly Cole, Bill Mellow, Chris Gilling	Nominated	
2014 Leo Awards	Best Sound Editing, TV Movie	Kirby Jinnah, Jmaes Fonnyadt, Ken Cade, Brian Campbell	Won	
2014 Leo Awards	Best Production Design, TV Movie	Gordon Wilding	Won	
2014 Leo Awards	Best Costume Design, TV Movie	Brenda Shenher	Won	
2014 ACTRA Manitoba Awards	Most Outstanding Performance by a Female Artist, TV	Ali Tataryn	Nominated	

== Memoir ==
In 2014, at age 86, Howe released his memoir, Mr. Hockey: My Story. The book covers his impoverished childhood, his five-decade hockey career through the transformation of struggling athletes to elite multi-millionaires, and his experience as part of the only father-and-sons team-up in major North American pro sports. A review in Publishers Weekly described it as "genial" and "vivid".

== See also ==
- List of films about ice hockey
