= Karen Baldwin (producer) =

Canadian film producer

Karen Elise Baldwin (born 16 June 1964) is a Canadian film producer. She is married to producer Howard Baldwin, and they have co-founded their own production firm. She won a Golden Globe for her 2004 film Ray.

== Filmography ==
- Sudden Death (1995, associate)
- The Patriot (1998, associate)
- Gideon (1998)
- The Long Kill (1999, executive)
- Resurrection (1999, co-producer)
- Mystery, Alaska (1999, co-producer)
- Joshua (2002)
- Children on Their Birthdays (2002)
- Swimming Upstream (2003)
- Where the Red Fern Grows (2003, executive)
- Danny Deckchair (2003, executive)
- Ray (2004)
- Sahara (2005)
- The Game of Their Lives (2005)
- A Sound of Thunder (2005)
- Death Sentence (2007)
- The Other Side of the Tracks (2008)
- Atlas Shrugged: Part I (2011, executive)
- Mr. Hockey: The Gordie Howe Story (2013, executive)
- Before We Go (2014)
- The Hurricane Heist (2018)
- Odd Man Rush (2020)
