= Letterkenny (TV series) =

Canadian television sitcom (2016–2023) created by Jared Keeso

- Title card
- Genre: Sitcom
- Created by: Jared Keeso
- Developed by: Jared Keeso; Jacob Tierney
- Directed by: Jacob Tierney
- Starring: Jared Keeso; Nathan Dales; Michelle Mylett; K. Trevor Wilson; Dylan Playfair; Andrew Herr; Tyler Johnston; Alexander De Jordy; Dan Petronijevic; Melanie Scrofano; Jacob Tierney; Lisa Codrington; Kaniehtiio Horn; Evan Stern; Mark Forward; Sarah Gadon; Kamilla Kowal
- Opening theme: "Who Needs a Girl Like You" by Indian Wars
- Country of origin: Canada
- Original language: English
- No. of seasons: 12
- No. of episodes: 81 (list of episodes)

Production
- Executive producers: Mark Montefiore; Patrick O'Sullivan; Jared Keeso; Jacob Tierney
- Producer: Kara Haflidson
- Production locations: Sudbury, Canada
- Cinematography: Jim Westenbrink
- Camera setup: Single-camera
- Running time: 19–30 minutes
- Production companies: New Metric Media; Bell Media; DHX Studios Toronto; WildBrain Studios; Play Fun Games Pictures

Original release
- Network: Crave
- Release: February 7, 2016 – December 25, 2023

Related
- Shoresy

Letterkenny is a Canadian television sitcom created by Jared Keeso and directed by Jacob Tierney, both of whom are also its developers and primary writers. It premiered via Crave on February 7, 2016, and concluded on December 25, 2023. The series follows the adventures of people residing in the fictional rural Ontario community of Letterkenny and stars Keeso, Nathan Dales, Michelle Mylett, and K. Trevor Wilson.

Adapted from a YouTube series called Letterkenny Problems, the show was commissioned by Crave in March 2015. It is distributed by Hulu in the United States, with the first two seasons debuting in July 2018. Subsequent seasons were added on December 27, 2018. Hulu acquired exclusive U.S. streaming rights in May 2019. The 12th and final season was released on December 25, 2023.

The show has received numerous awards and nominations, including a Canadian Screen Award for Best Comedy Series. A spin-off series created by and starring Keeso, Shoresy, debuted via Crave in 2022.

== Overview ==
Letterkenny revolves around the titular rural Ontario community, which took its name from Letterkenny in Ireland and is populated mostly by the descendants of Irish immigrants who escaped to Canada during the Great Famine. The majority of episodes open with text stating, "There are 5000 people in Letterkenny. These are their problems." The series focuses on siblings Wayne and Katy, who run a small farm and produce stand with help from Wayne's friends Daryl and Squirrely Dan.

Episodes deal with small-town life amongst different types of people: the farmers ("Hicks"), gym goers and out-of-towners who play for the local ice hockey team ("Jocks"), the town's obviously closeted Christian minister Glen, the drug addicts ("Skids"), members of the nearby First Nation reservation ("Natives"), the neighbouring Mennonites, and the Québécois. Early plots often revolved around Wayne defending his reputation as "the toughest guy in Letterkenny", the town's unsuccessful ice hockey team, the Skids' schemes to rip everyone off for drug money, and Wayne's dating life after dumping his high school sweetheart who cheated on him.

Each episode begins with a cold open presented in a mockumentary style with characters speaking directly to the camera, which is intercut with a regular sitcom format depicting the scenario the characters are describing; following the opening title sequence the mockumentary style is abandoned and the characters rarely address the camera again within the episode. The show has been praised for subverting the trope of small-town residents being portrayed as narrow-minded and unintelligent; this is most commonly exemplified by the running joke that almost all characters express sophisticated and informed views on social issues and can produce a constant flow of one-liners, puns, comebacks, and wordplay when in conversation with each other.

== Cast and characters ==
- Jared Keeso as Wayne and Shoresy (Note: Keeso's face is obscured when playing Shoresy and was only revealed in the character's own spin-off series.)
- Nathan Dales as Daryl
- Michelle Mylett as Katy
- K. Trevor Wilson as Squirrelly Dan
- Dylan Playfair as Reilly
- Andrew Herr as Jonesy
- Tyler Johnston as Stewart
- Alexander De Jordy as Devon (seasons 1–2)
- Dan Petronijevic as McMurray (seasons 2–12; recurring season 1)
- Melanie Scrofano as Mrs. McMurray (seasons 2-4; 6; 8–12)
- Jacob Tierney as Glen (seasons 2–12; recurring season 1)
- Lisa Codrington as Gail (seasons 2–12; recurring season 1)
- Kaniehtiio Horn as Tanis (seasons 2–12; recurring season 1)
- Evan Stern as Roald (seasons 3–12; recurring seasons 1–2)
- Mark Forward as Coach (seasons 3–12; recurring seasons 1–2)
- Sarah Gadon as Gae (seasons 3 and 6; guest star season 5)
- Kamilla Kowal as Bonnie McMurray (seasons 9–12; recurring seasons 1–8)

== Production ==
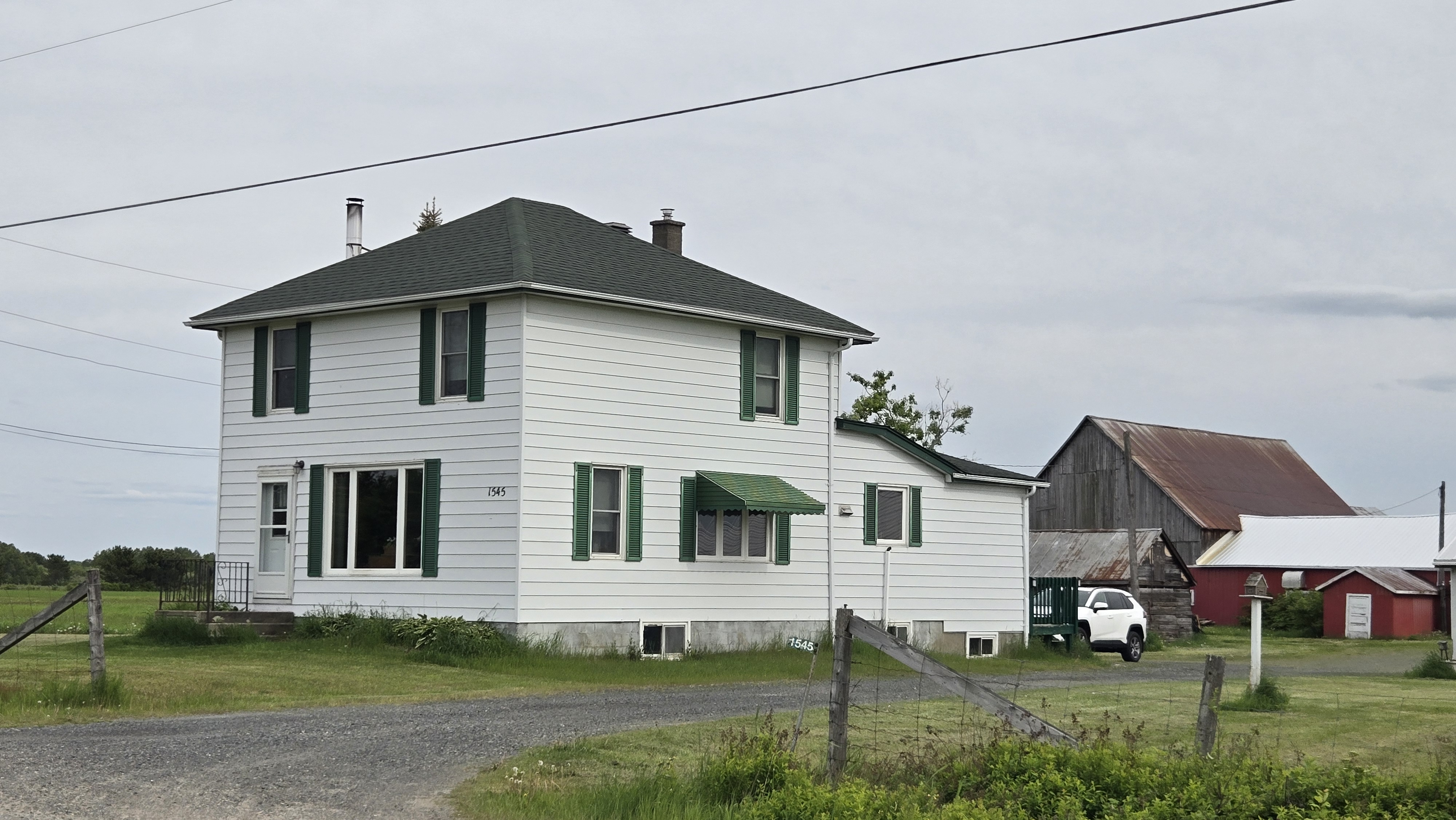
Farmhouse and barn used during the filming of the series, shown in 2025.

Letterkenny was filmed in Sudbury, Ontario. It is the first original series commissioned by Crave, and premiered on that platform on February 7, 2016. The town of Letterkenny portrayed in the series is fictional and is not based on the real Letterkenny in Ontario, which is now part of Brudenell, Lyndoch and Raglan. The town in the show is instead loosely based on Keeso's hometown of Listowel, Ontario, itself named after a town in Ireland.

The show has its roots in Letterkenny Problems, a short-form web series created by Keeso and released on YouTube in 2013. The original Letterkenny Problems consisted almost entirely of Keeso and Dales trading off comedic one-liners while simply standing in various locations, a theme that would later resurface as the intro to some Letterkenny episodes. Letterkenny Problems garnered a Canadian Screen Award nomination for Best Original Fiction Program or Series Created for Digital Media at the 2nd Canadian Screen Awards in 2014.

Tierney and Michael Dowse are also involved in the production of the series. Tierney additionally has a supporting role as Pastor Glen in the series, whose cast also includes Michelle Mylett, Dylan Playfair, Andrew Herr, Tyler Johnston, Lisa Codrington, Kaniehtiio Horn, and K. Trevor Wilson.

In March 2016, Letterkenny was renewed for a second season. In August, just weeks after production wrapped on Season 2, CraveTV announced that they had ordered a third season. A 2017 St. Patrick's Day special episode, "St. Perfect's Day", was released. The third season was released on July 1, 2017 (Canada Day). In October 2017, a Halloween episode was released, and it was announced that the series had a new media partner which agreed to a production commitment for 40 new episodes, a 26-city Letterkenny Live! tour beginning in February 2018, and Letterkenny merchandise. The fourth season was released in December 2017. The fifth season was released in June 2018.

The Letterkenny Christmas special was released in November 2018, followed by a sixth season in December. The Valentine's Day special episode was released in February 2019, followed by the seventh season in October 2019. The eighth season was released in December 2019, and the ninth season was released in December 2020. In September 2020, seasons 10 and 11 were confirmed, with filming planned to begin in August 2020 but delayed due to the COVID-19 pandemic. In June 2021, production began on seasons 10 and 11 and it was also announced that Shoresy, the hockey player voiced by Keeso but whose face was never shown in Letterkenny, would be the focus of the spin-off series Shoresy.

Letterkenny released its 12th and final season on December 25, 2023. To prepare for the final season, New Metric Media re-acquired the distribution sale rights to the series and the rest of their catalog from WildBrain and struck a streaming deal with Netflix internationally. That same month, Crave announced a content deal with Keeso and New Metric Media for at least 49 episodes of Shoresy and other potential Letterkenny spinoffs to be announced.

== Episodes ==
Letterkenny seasons
Season	Episodes	Originally released
1	6	February 7, 2016
2	6	December 25, 2016
Special		March 17, 2017
3	6	July 1, 2017
Special		October 20, 2017
4	6	December 25, 2017
Special		March 23, 2018
5	6	June 29, 2018
Special		November 23, 2018
6	6	December 25, 2018
Special		February 1, 2019
7	6	October 11, 2019
8	7	December 25, 2019
9	7	December 25, 2020
10	6	December 25, 2021
Special		March 8, 2022
11	6	December 25, 2022
Special		May 19, 2023
12	6	December 25, 2023

== Spin-offs ==
=== Littlekenny ===
Littlekenny, a six-episode animated spin-off serving as an origin story focusing on the main characters as children, premiered on June 28, 2019. Episodes more closely follow the original Letterkenny Problems format than the extended universe of Letterkenny.

Littlekenny episodes
No.	Title	Directed by	Written by	Original release date
1	"Littlekenny Problems #1"	Jared Keeso	Jared Keeso	June 28, 2019
A boy from Letterkenny tells his problems.
2	"Daryl"	Jared Keeso	Jared Keeso	June 28, 2019
Wayne makes a friend.
3	"Littlekenny Problems #2"	Jared Keeso	Jared Keeso	June 28, 2019
Two boys from Letterkenny tell their problems.
4	"Daryl's First Super Soft Birthday"	Jared Keeso	Jared Keeso	June 28, 2019
Wayne and Katy attend Daryl's birthday party.
5	"Littlekenny Problems #3"	Jared Keeso	Jared Keeso	June 28, 2019
Two boys from Letterkenny tell even more of their problems.
6	"Daniel"	Jared Keeso	Jared Keeso	June 28, 2019
Wayne and Daryl make a friend.

=== Shoresy ===
In June 2021, Bell Media announced the Letterkenny spin-off Shoresy, based on the eponymous character played by Keeso. The series was written by Keeso and directed by Tierney. It premiered on Crave on May 13, 2022.

== Home media ==
The series has been released on DVD in Canada by Elevation Pictures and in the United States by Universal Pictures Home Entertainment.

Title	Episodes	Region 1 (Canada)	Region 1 (United States)	Discs	Bonus Features
Season 1	6	November 21, 2017		1	
Season 2	7	March 13, 2018		1	Bonus Episode: "St. Perfect's Day"
Seasons 1 & 2	13		November 5, 2019	2	Bonus Episode: "St. Perfect's Day"
Season 3	6	August 7, 2018		1	
Season 4	7	October 2, 2018		1	Bonus Episode: "The Haunting of MoDean's II"
Seasons 3 & 4	13		June 9, 2020	2	Bonus Episode: "The Haunting of MoDean's II"
Season 5	7	November 27, 2018		1	Bonus Episode: "Super Hard Easter"
Seasons 1–5	33	November 27, 2018		5	Bonus Episodes: "St. Perfect's Day" "The Haunting of MoDean's II" "Super Hard Easter"
Season 6	7	August 27, 2019		1	Bonus Episode: "The Three Wise Men"
Seasons 5 & 6	14		November 10, 2020	2	Bonus Episodes: "Super Hard Easter" "The Three Wise Men"
Season 7	7	February 4, 2020		1	Bonus Episode: "Valentimes Day"
Season 8	7	August 11, 2020		1	
Seasons 1–8	54	October 13, 2020		8	Bonus Episodes: "St. Perfect's Day" "The Haunting of MoDean's II" "Super Hard Easter" "The Three Wise Men" "Valentimes Day"
Season 9	7	December 14, 2021		1	

== Reception ==
=== Critical reception ===
John Doyle of The Globe and Mail called the series "refreshing and intoxicating [...] funny, mad, droll, childish, and spiky". Focusing on the show's characteristic use of thick Ontario dialects, he wrote, "Not since Trailer Park Boys launched have we heard the flavourful, salty Canadian vernacular used with such aplomb and abandon. [...] Almost all the conversations are raw comedy and utterly plausible as small-town guy talk, not just in Canada but in villages and parishes wherever the grass grows." Alan Sepinwall of Rolling Stone called the show "marvelously goofy [...] strange, simple, [and] delightful".

The series has also been praised for its complex and fully-rounded depiction of its First Nations characters, which the producers attribute to the show's practice of involving the actors directly in the creation, writing, and costuming of their characters.

=== Ratings ===
Crave stated that Letterkenny's debut was the biggest debut of any series on their platform since it launched in 2014, and that (as of March 10, 2016) nearly one third of all its subscribers have watched the series.

=== Accolades ===
Awards and nominations received by Letterkenny
Award	Year	Category	Nominee(s)	Result	Ref.
Canadian Comedy Awards	2016	Best TV Show	Letterkenny	Nominated	
Canadian Screen Awards	2014	Best Original Fiction Program or Series Created for Digital Media	Letterkenny Problems	Nominated	
Canadian Screen Awards	2017	Best Comedy Series	Mark Montefiore, Patrick O'Sullivan, Jared Keeso, Jacob Tierney	Won	
Canadian Screen Awards	2017	Best Direction in a Comedy Program or Series	Jacob Tierney ("Super Soft Birthday")	Won	
Canadian Screen Awards	2017	Best Writing in a Comedy Program or Series	Jacob Tierney and Jared Keeso ("Super Soft Birthday")	Won	
Canadian Screen Awards	2017	Best Performance by an Actor in a Continuing Leading Comedic Role	Jared Keeso	Nominated	
Canadian Screen Awards	2017	Best Achievement in Casting	Jenny Lewis, Sara Kay ("Rave")	Nominated	
Canadian Screen Awards	2017	Best Performance by an Actor in a Featured Supporting Role or Guest Role in a Comedic Series	Nathan Dales	Nominated	
Canadian Screen Awards	2017	Best Picture Editing in a Comedy Program or Series	Erin Deck ("Super Soft Birthday")	Nominated	
Canadian Screen Awards	2017	Best Picture Editing in a Comedy Program or Series	Duncan Christie ("Ain't No Reason To Get Excited")	Nominated	
Canadian Screen Awards	2018	Best Comedy Series	Mark Montefiore, Patrick O'Sullivan, Jared Keeso, Jacob Tierney	Nominated	
Canadian Screen Awards	2018	Best Direction in a Comedy Program or Series	Jacob Tierney ("The Election")	Won	
Canadian Screen Awards	2018	Best Writing in a Comedy Program or Series	Jacob Tierney and Jared Keeso ("Relationships")	Won	
Canadian Screen Awards	2018	Best Performance by an Actor in a Continuing Leading Comedic Role	Jared Keeso	Nominated	
Canadian Screen Awards	2018	Best Performance by an Actor in a Featured Supporting Role or Guest Role in a Comedic Series	K. Trevor Wilson	Nominated	
Canadian Screen Awards	2018	Best Photography in a Comedic Series	Jim Westenbrink ("Relationships")	Nominated	
Canadian Screen Awards	2018	Best Picture Editing in a Comedic Series	Christopher Minns ("The Election")	Nominated	
Canadian Screen Awards	2018	Best Sound in a Fiction Series	Rick Penn, Jamie Sulek, Devin Doucette, Kieran Sherry, Rob Ainsley, Clive Turner ("Relationships")	Nominated	
Canadian Screen Awards	2018	Best Casting	Jenny Lewis, Sara Kay	Nominated	
Canadian Screen Awards	2019	Best Comedy Series	Letterkenny	Nominated	
Canadian Screen Awards	2019	Best Lead Actor, Comedy	Jared Keeso	Won	
Canadian Screen Awards	2019	Best Writing, Comedy	Jared Keeso, Jacob Tierney	Won	
Canadian Screen Awards	2020	Best Comedy Series	Letterkenny	Nominated	
Canadian Screen Awards	2020	Best Lead Actor in a Comedy Series	Jared Keeso	Nominated	
Canadian Screen Awards	2020	Best Lead Actress in a Comedy Series	Michelle Mylett	Nominated	
Canadian Screen Awards	2020	Best Supporting Actor in a Comedy Series	Mark Forward	Nominated	
Canadian Screen Awards	2020	Best Photography in a Comedy Series	Jim Westenbrink — "The City"	Nominated	
Canadian Screen Awards	2020	Best Picture Editing, Comedy	Drew MacLeod — "Dyck's Slip Out"	Nominated	
Canadian Screen Awards	2020	Best Picture Editing, Comedy	Kyle Martin — "Letterkenny vs. Penny"	Nominated	
Canadian Screen Awards	2020	Best Stunt Coordination	Dan Skene — "In It to Win It"	Nominated	
Canadian Screen Awards	2020	Best Direction in a Comedy Series	Jacob Tierney — "Yew!"	Won	
Canadian Screen Awards	2020	Best Writing in a Comedy Series	Jared Keeso, Jacob Tierney — "Yew!"	Won	
Canadian Screen Awards	2021	Best Comedy Series	Letterkenny	Nominated	
Canadian Screen Awards	2021	Best Lead Actor in a Comedy Series	Jared Keeso	Nominated	
Canadian Screen Awards	2021	Best Casting in a Television Series	Jenny Lewis, Sara Kay	Nominated	
Canadian Screen Awards	2021	Best Photography in a Comedy Series	Jim Westenbrink — "The Rippers"	Nominated	
Canadian Screen Awards	2021	Best Picture Editing, Comedy	Kyle Martin — "Yard Sale Saturday"	Nominated	
Canadian Screen Awards	2021	Best Stunt Coordination	Dan Skene	Nominated	
Canadian Screen Awards	2022	Best Comedy Series	Letterkenny	Nominated	
Canadian Screen Awards	2022	Best Lead Actor in a Comedy Series	Jared Keeso	Nominated	
Canadian Screen Awards	2022	Best Supporting Actress in a Comedy Series	Lisa Codrington	Nominated	
Canadian Screen Awards	2022	Best Supporting Actress in a Comedy Series	Kaniehtiio Horn	Won	
Canadian Screen Awards	2022	Best Photography in a Comedy Program or Series	Jim Westenbrink — "Sleepover"	Won	
Canadian Screen Awards	2022	Best Editing in a Comedy Program or Series	Kyle Martin — "Sleepover"	Won	
Canadian Screen Awards	2022	Best Writing in a Comedy Series	Jared Keeso, Mark Forward — "Kids with Problems"	Nominated	
WGC Screenwriting Awards	2017	Best Script From a Rookie Series	Jared Keeso & Jacob Tierney ("Ain't No Reason to Get Excited")	Nominated	
WGC Screenwriting Awards	2017	Best TV Comedy	Jared Keeso & Jacob Tierney ("Super Soft Birthday")	Won	
WGC Screenwriting Awards	2018	Best TV Comedy	Jared Keeso & Jacob Tierney ("Relationships")	Won	
