= K. Trevor Wilson =

Canadian comedian, writer and actor (born 1981)

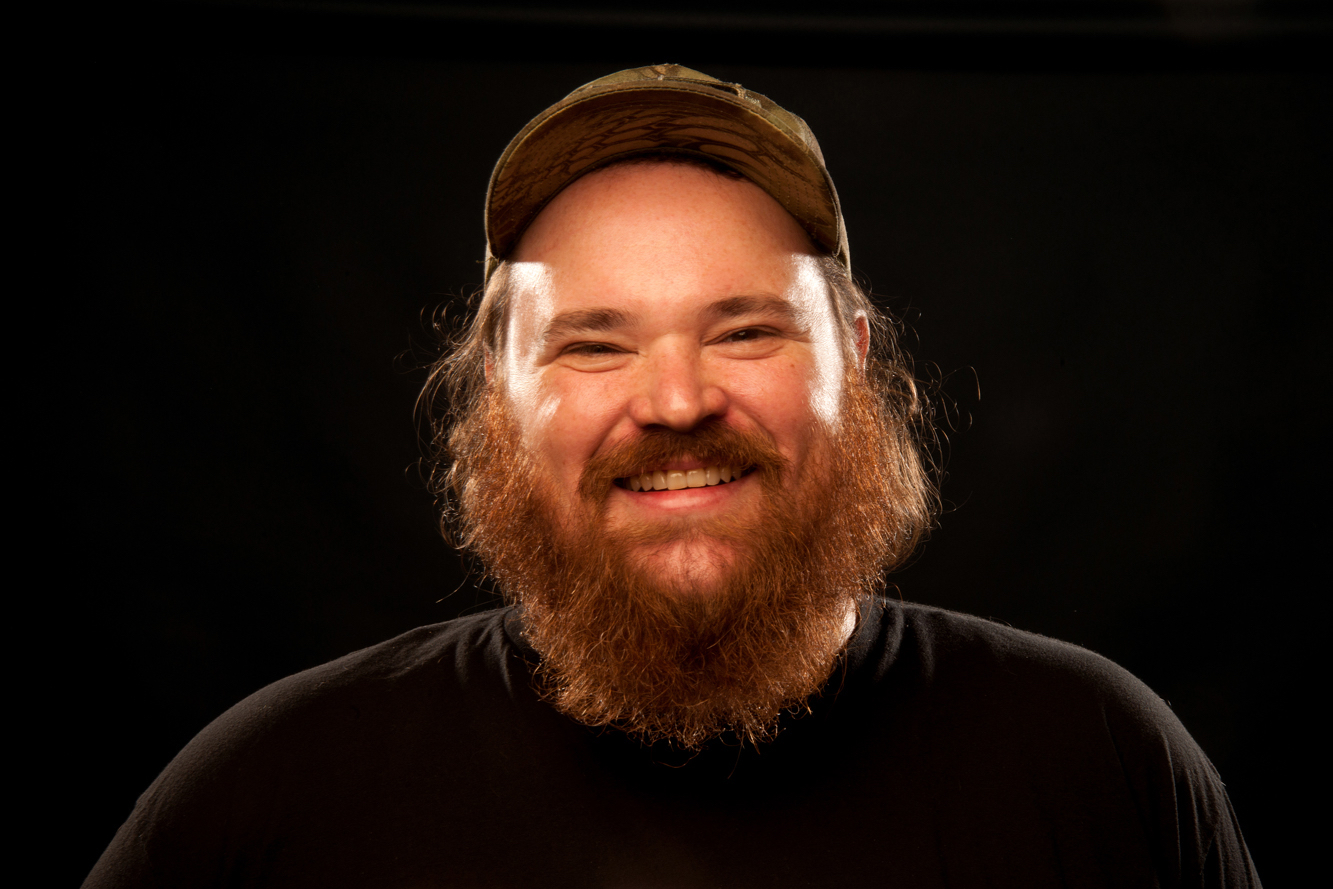
- Born: Trevor Kingsley Wilson; March 9, 1981 (age 45); Toronto, Ontario, Canada
- Education: Etobicoke School of the Arts; Humber College
- Occupations: Actor; comedian
- Years active: 1996–present
- Website: ktrevorwilson.com

Trevor Kingsley Wilson (born March 9, 1981), known professionally as K. Trevor Wilson, is a Canadian comedian, writer and actor. He grew up in Toronto, Ontario and is best known as the character Squirrely Dan in Letterkenny (2016–2023).

== Early life ==
Wilson was born in Toronto to Rod Wilson.

== Career ==
=== Standup comedy ===
In 2012, Wilson won the Irwin Barker Home Grown Award at the Just for Laughs Festival in Montreal. He has since appeared multiple times at the festival, as well as JFL 42, Winnipeg Comedy Festival, Halifax Comedy Festival and performed on Jimmy Kimmel Live and Comedy Central's Roast Battle.

His debut album SexCop Fire Penis reached the top of the iTunes Comedy Charts and won Best Taped Live Performance at the 2015 Canadian Comedy Awards. His follow up, Sorry! (A Canadian Album), debuted at the top of the iTunes Comedy Charts and was nominated for the Juno Award for Comedy Album of the Year.

In 2017, his first special, Bigger in Person, debuted on The Comedy Network. Wilson was also featured in the Netflix series, Comedians of The World that was released January 1, 2019.

Wilson is an original member of the Comedy Records Roster and was featured on the label's 10 year anniversary album.

In 2021, he was announced as one of the judges in the first season of Roast Battle Canada. In 2022, he appeared in LOL: Last One Laughing Canada.

=== Acting ===
As a child actor, Wilson was featured multiple times on the Canadian series Goosebumps. In 2010, he stood alongside Nelly Furtado in the film Score: A Hockey Musical and has since been part of multiple series including What Would Sal Do? and Man Seeking Woman.

In 2016, Wilson debuted as Squirrely Dan on Crave's Letterkenny.

At the 6th Canadian Screen Awards, Wilson received a nomination for Best Supporting Actor in a Comedy Series.

== Personal life ==
He graduated from the Etobicoke School of the Arts as well as Humber College.

Wilson chose the stage name "K. Trevor Wilson"—transposing his given name and middle initial—at the suggestion of his agent when he registered with ACTRA, because there was already another member with the name "Trevor Wilson".

Trevor Wilson is a lifelong professional wrestling fan and collector. He has said that one of his biggest regrets from childhood was the apparent loss of his original LJN wrestling ring and blue steel cage during a family move, which he believes may have been stolen by movers. Despite that loss, Wilson has maintained an extensive collection of LJN wrestling figures, which was later expanded with rare figures gifted to him by fellow comedian Hunter Collins. He keeps the collection on display in his basement and has also amassed a large collection of professional wrestling T-shirts, though he has said he is considering downsizing it due to its size.

== Filmography ==
=== Film ===
- Score: A Hockey Musical (2010), Fat Bellied Man
- Mr. Viral (2012), Ralph
- The Art of the Steal (2013), Beefy Guy #2

=== Television ===
Year	Title	Role	Notes
1996–1997	Goosebumps	First Teen / Kid #1	2 episodes
1997	Exhibit A: Secrets of Forensic Science	John Mitchell	Episode: "Splinter of Guilt"
1999	Twice in a Lifetime	Young Coach Duane	Episode: "Blood Brothers"
2000	The Loretta Claiborne Story	Teen #1	Television film
2001	Crash Course	Jock	Television film
2005–2006	Darcy's Wild Life	Deuce	3 episodes
2006	Missing	Mutt	Episode: "Spring Break"
2006	This Is Wonderland	Scott Dawson	Episode #3.10
2007–2008	Billable Hours	Computer Tech / Stacey	5 episodes
2009	The Border	Cornell	Episode: "Dark Ride"
2011	Breakout Kings	Con #1	Episode: "There Are Rules"
2011	Desperately Seeking Santa	Fat Guy at Audition	Television film
2013	Satisfaction	Pot Dealer	Episode: "The Pot and the Pirate"
2015	Last Chance for Christmas	Randy	Television film
2016	Odd Squad	The Egg King	Episode: "Extreme Cakeover/A Job Well Undone"
2016–2023	Letterkenny	Squirrelly Dan	81 episodes
2017	Man Seeking Woman	Morris	Episode: "Blood"
2017	What Would Sal Do?	Homeless Guy / Peter	2 episodes
2017	There Is Something in Slough Lake	Travis	Television film
2019	Littlekenny	Young Dan	Episode: "Daniel"
2019	Bigfoot	Bigfoot	6 episodes
2022	Hudson & Rex	Reptile Joey	Episode: "Den of Snakes"
2023	Scott Pilgrim Takes Off	Venue Bartender (voice)	Episode: "A League of Their Own"

== See also ==
- List of Canadian comedians
- Comedy Records
