= List of films about ice hockey =

The following is a list of films about ice hockey, a subset of the sports film genre.

Year	Title	Genre	Notes
1936	King of Hockey	Drama	A teammate's punch causes hockey star Gabby Dugan to go blind.
1937	Idol of the Crowds	Drama	John Wayne as a hockey player who wants to buy a chicken farm.
1937	The Game That Kills	Drama	After a player dies during a game, coach's daughter Rita Hayworth digs for the truth.
1938	The Duke of West Point	Drama	A misunderstood London-raised athlete is shunned by other cadets before game vs. Canadians.
1940	Olympic Honeymoon	Comedy	A honeymooner is mistaken for a hockey player and invited to play for England.
1946	Gay Blades	Comedy	A talent scout discovers and distracts Andy Buell, the star player of the Duluth Rustlers.
1953	White Lightning	Drama	Criminals offer bribes to the Red Devils' hockey stars to deliberately lose games.
1965	The Hockey Players	Drama	Film about the challenges of aging in professional hockey, focusing on 30-year-old team captain Anatoly Duganov, who fights against stereotypes.
1970	Love Story	Romance	A Harvard hockey player (Ryan O'Neal) loves, then loses a doomed young woman.
1971	Face-Off	Romance	A Toronto Maple Leafs rookie and his relationship with a musician.
1973	Paperback Hero	Drama	A big-time hockey star (Keir Dullea) ends up in a tiny Saskatchewan town.
1977	Slap Shot	Comedy	Starring Paul Newman as the player-coach of a rowdy, raunchy minor-league team.
1977	The Deadliest Season	Drama	TV film with Michael Moriarty and Meryl Streep about hockey's violence.
1978	Ice Castles	Drama	Alexis "Lexie" Winston is a sixteen-year-old girl from Waverly, Iowa who dreams of becoming a champion figure skater. Her boyfriend, Nick Peterson, dreams of being a hockey player.
1980	The Boy Who Drank Too Much	Drama	TV film with Scott Baio as a high school hockey player, well-liked and respected despite being an alcoholic.
1981	Miracle on Ice	Drama	A television film on the 1980 Miracle on Ice at the Lake Placid Olympics.
1983	Strange Brew	Comedy	A group of mentally insane men who are under the effects of drug induced beer, play ice hockey inside of the beer factory's freezer room.
1984	Hockey Night	Drama	Cathy Yarrow tries out for the local boys' team
1986	Youngblood	Drama	Rob Lowe is an American teen assigned to a Canada junior league.
1986	Touch and Go	Romance	A National Hockey League player (Michael Keaton) falls for a young single mom.
1992	The Mighty Ducks	Comedy	Disney family yarn about a youth team coached by Emilio Estevez.
1992	The Cutting Edge	Romance	The ultimate love/skate relationship between a figure skater and a hockey player
1993	Gross Misconduct: The Life of Brian Spencer	Drama	A look into the life of troubled former hockey player Brian Spencer
1994	D2: The Mighty Ducks	Comedy	Sequel, with Ducks players competing in Junior Goodwill Games.
1995	Net Worth	Drama	The story of the early years of the NHL and the off ice battle between the owners and players
1995	Sudden Death	Action	A lone fire marshal is pitted against extortionists who hold unsuspecting NHL players and fans for ransom during game seven of the Stanley Cup Finals.
1996	D3: The Mighty Ducks	Comedy	Ducks enroll in an elite academy, receiving a rude welcome. Second sequel.
1996	Happy Gilmore	Comedy	A rejected hockey player puts his skills to the golf course to save his grandmother's house.
1997	Les Boys	Comedy	Quebec story of boys from a low-level amateur team.
1998	Les Boys II	Comedy	Quebec sequel, story of boys from a low-level amateur team.
1998	The Ice Rink	Comedy	A film crew uses an ice hockey game as the backdrop for a love story
1999	H-E Double Hockey Sticks	Family comedy	Satan's apprentice tempts a young hockey player.
1999	Mystery, Alaska	Drama	Alaska team led by Russell Crowe plays an outdoor game against the New York Rangers.
1999	Genius	Comedy	A teen genius juggles the roles of college student and junior high bad boy while growing up in a hockey family.
2000	MVP: Most Valuable Primate	Comedy	Family fare about a hockey-playing chimp.
2001	Les Boys III	Comedy	Quebec sequel, story of boys from a low-level amateur team.
2002	Slap Shot 2: Breaking the Ice	Comedy	Direct-to-video follow-up to 1977 film, with new cast plus the Hanson Brothers.
2004	Miracle	Drama	Based on the 1980 Miracle on Ice, with Kurt Russell as coach Herb Brooks.
2004	The Chiefs	Documentary	Documentary follows the Laval Chiefs, a semi-pro team that plays in the LHSPQ
2005	The Rocket (Maurice Richard)	Drama	Biographical film on National Hockey League legend Maurice "The Rocket" Richard.
2005	Go Figure	Comedy	The Disney story of a figure skater turned hockey player
2005	Waking Up Wally	Biographical	Based on the book written by Walter Gretzky recounting his recovery from a stroke which left him without any memory of his son Wayne.
2005	Les Boys IV	Comedy	Quebec sequel, story of boys from a low-level amateur team featuring NHL all-time greats
2006	Bon Cop, Bad Cop	Comedy	Buddy cop film in which two Canadians investigate murders related to hockey.
2006	National Lampoon's Pucked	Comedy	Frank Hopper (Bon Jovi) is a former lawyer who receives a credit card in the mail and believes he's hit the jackpot. It's not long before he's working his way toward financing his dream – an all-woman hockey team. He's also put himself in debt for more than $300,000. He winds up in court when his plan backfires.
2006	In the Crease	Documentary	Documents the inspirational true story of a teenage hockey team and their quest to win a national championship.
2008	The Love Guru	Comedy	Toronto Maple Leafs owner hires a guru (Mike Myers) to advise her star player.
2008	Slap Shot 3: The Junior League	Comedy	The Hanson Brothers are back to whip a youth league team into shape
2008	Pond Hockey	Documentary	Examines the changing culture of sports through insightful interviews with hockey stars, experts, journalists and local rink rats alike.
2008	Junior	Documentary	Film chronicling a year in the life of Baie-Comeau Drakkar of the Quebec Maritime Junior Hockey League.
2010	Broad Street Bullies	Documentary	Documentary about the Philadelphia Flyers NHL team
2010	Score: A Hockey Musical	Musical comedy	A home-schooled 17-year-old becomes a pro hockey player.
2010	Tooth Fairy	Comedy	Derek Thompson (Dwayne Johnson) is a minor league hockey player nicknamed the "Tooth Fairy" who becomes a real tooth fairy
2010	Keep Your Head Up, Kid: The Don Cherry Story	Drama, comedy	Hockey player Don Cherry spends years in the minor leagues, then lands a job as coach of the Boston Bruins in the 1970s.
2010	Den Brother	Comedy	Star high school hockey player needs to help his sister with girl scouts in this Disney film
2011	Breakaway	Drama	A hockey-playing Sikh teen falls in love with coach Rob Lowe's sister.
2011	Goon	Comedy	A bar bouncer (Seann William Scott) becomes a hockey team's enforcer.
2011	Wrath of Grapes: The Don Cherry Story II	Drama Comedy	Sequel, The Don Cherry story continues
2012	The Pee-Wee 3D: The Winter That Changed My Life	Drama Comedy	The film centers on the Lynx, a junior hockey team in Mont-Saint-Hilaire, Quebec, who are preparing for their league's top tournament.
2013	Big Shot	Documentary	Made for TV as a part of ESPN's 30 for 30 series. How young businessman John Spano struck a deal to buy the New York Islanders, only to be later revealed as a fraud.
2013	Legend № 17	Drama	Based on the career of Russian legend Valery Kharlamov.
2013	Mr. Hockey: The Gordie Howe Story	Biographical	The story of the 1973 hockey season when aging legend Gordie Howe returned to the ice at the age of 44 to play on the same team with his sons Marty and Mark.
2014	Red Army	Documentary	A look at Russia's hockey dominance during the Cold War.
2015	Of Miracles and Men	Documentary	Made for TV as a part of ESPN's 30 for 30 series. Tells the story of the rise of the Soviet Union as a hockey power, leading up to an exploration of the Miracle on Ice from the Soviet team's point of view.
2016	The Swap	Comedy	A Disney hockey story following a rhythmic gymnast and an ice hockey player switching bodies.
2016	Hello Destroyer	Drama	A young junior hockey player's life is shattered by an in-game act of violence.
2016	Ice Guardians	Documentary	Documentary directed and written by Brett Harvey about ice hockey enforcers.
2016	Soul on Ice	Documentary	Documentary about the Colored Hockey League and the history of Black players in ice hockey.
2017	Indian Horse	Drama	Follows the life of Native Canadian Saul Indian Horse as he survives residential school and life amongst the racism of the 1970s. A talented hockey player, Saul must find his own path as he battles stereotypes and alcoholism.
2017	Goon: Last of the Enforcers	Comedy	Sequel to 2011 film.
2017	Major Junior (Junior Majeur)	Drama	A sequel to the 2012 film The Pee-Wee 3D: The Winter That Changed My Life (Les Pee-Wee 3d: L'hiver qui a changé ma vie), the film centres on Janeau Trudel and Joey Boulet, who are now playing for the Chicoutimi Saguenéens of the QMJHL and hopeful of getting chosen in the NHL entry draft.
2018	Ahockalypse	Comedy, Horror	After winning the championship cup, Jonsey and his team must survive the zombie apocalypse.
2018	Frozen In Love	Drama, Romance	A struggling bookshop owner and a troubled hockey player are paired together to improve their public image.
2019	Red Penguins	Documentary	
2019	Goalie	Biographical	A look at the life of goaltender Terry Sawchuk.
2020	Odd Man Rush	Drama, comedy	Coming-of-age dramedy about Harvard hockey player chasing NHL dream in the European minor leagues. Based on Bill Keenan's memoir Odd Man Rush.
2021	Nebesnaya komanda	Drama	The film tells about the fans of the Lokomotiv Yaroslavl ice hockey club, who go to Minsk to support their favorite team.
2021	Untold: Crimes & Penalties	Documentary	focuses on the now defunct United Hockey League (UHL) ice hockey team the Danbury Trashers, which was bought by James Galante, a mafia-connected trash kingpin.
2022	Hockeyland	Documentary	Hockey in the heart of Minnesota's North Country.
2022	Black Ice	Documentary	History of the Colored Hockey League.
2022	The Cannons	Documentary	Follows two Black teenage hockey players who play for the Fort Dupont Cannons in Washington, D.C., and their coach, Neal Henderson.
2023	I'm Just Here for the Riot	Documentary	Made for TV as part of ESPN's 30 for 30 series. An examination of the 2011 riot in Vancouver that followed the Canucks' loss in Game 7 of the Stanley Cup Final.
2023	Ice Queens	Documentary	The history of Black women in ice hockey.
2024	Saving Sakic	Documentary	Tells the story of how Harrison Ford helped keep Joe Sakic in Denver with the Colorado Avalanche.
2024	The Late Game	Comedy	A new guy knocks off the rust as he suits up in a late night beer league hockey game.
2024	Inside Out 2	Drama, comedy	A 13-year-old girl named Riley balances her childhood friendships and trying to succeed at Hockey Camp.
2025	Youngblood (2025 film)	Drama	An adaptation of the 1986 film of the same name, the story of Dean Youngblood, a young Black hockey player from Detroit who joins a team in Hamilton, Ontario.

== Highest grossing ice hockey films ==
The following is a list of ice hockey films that surpassed $1 million.

Inside Out 2 is the highest grossing ice hockey film of all time, the highest grossing sport film, the 3rd highest-grossing animated film and the 10th highest grossing film of all time. All of the films have had a theatrical run (including re-releases) since 1975 and films that have not played during this period do not appear on the chart because of ticket-price inflation, population size and ticket purchasing trends not being considered.

Highest grossing ice hockey films
Rank	Film	Worldwide gross	Year	Ref
1	Inside Out 2	$1,698,863,816	2024	
2	Love Story	$173,400,000	1970	
3	Tooth Fairy	$112,462,508	2010	
4	Miracle	$64,445,708	2004	
5	The Mighty Ducks	$50,755,845	1992	
6	D2: The Mighty Ducks	$45,610,410	1994	
7	The Love Guru	$40,877,556	2008	
8	Slap Shot	$28,000,000	1977	
9	The Cutting Edge	$25,105,517	1992	
10	Youngblood	$15,448,384	1986	
11	D3: The Mighty Ducks	$22,955,097	1996	
12	Bon Cop, Bad Cop	$12,735,126	2006	
13	Goon	$6,985,158	2011	
14	Indian Horse	$2,097,362	2017	
15	Touch and Go	$1,254,040	1986	
16	MVP: Most Valuable Primate	$1,248,746	2000	

== See also ==
- List of sports films
- List of highest-grossing sports films
- Ice hockey in popular culture
