= Sudden Death (1995 film) =

- Theatrical release poster
- Directed by: Peter Hyams
- Screenplay by: Gene Quintano
- Story by: Karen Baldwin
- Produced by: Howard Baldwin; Moshe Diamant
- Starring: Jean-Claude Van Damme; Powers Boothe; Raymond J. Barry; Dorian Harewood
- Cinematography: Peter Hyams
- Edited by: Steven Kemper
- Music by: John Debney
- Production company: Shattered Productions
- Distributed by: Universal Pictures
- Release date: December 22, 1995
- Running time: 110 minutes
- Country: United States
- Language: English
- Budget: $35 million
- Box office: $64.4 million

Sudden Death is a 1995 American sports action-thriller film shot and directed by Peter Hyams and starring Jean-Claude Van Damme, with Powers Boothe, Raymond J. Barry, and Dorian Harewood co-starring in supporting roles. The film pits a lone fire marshal against extortionists who hold unsuspecting NHL players and fans for ransom during game seven of the Stanley Cup Final, and set payment milestones to coincide with the game's progress. It was Hyams' second directorial collaboration with Van Damme, after Timecop (1994) and before Enemies Closer (2013).

Sudden Death was released in the United States by Universal Pictures on December 22, 1995, to mixed reviews, albeit better than most of Van Damme's earlier efforts. The film fell short of Timecop's performance, especially domestically. However, it was a minor success, grossing $64 million at the box office – on an announced budget of $35 million. The film became a popular staple for cable TV and in video rentals and sales.

== Plot ==
Darren McCord is a French Canadian-born firefighter for the Pittsburgh Bureau of Fire, now serving as the fire marshal for the Pittsburgh Civic Arena after being unable to save a young girl from a house fire two years prior. Darren has taken his son, Tyler, and daughter Emily to Game 7 of the 1995 Stanley Cup Final between the Pittsburgh Penguins and the Chicago Blackhawks (a fictional rematch of the 1992 Stanley Cup Final) as a birthday gift for Tyler. During the game, the Vice President of the United States and several other VIPs are taken hostage in the owner's box by a group of terrorists led by former Central Intelligence Agency(CIA) agent Joshua Foss. Foss has rigged the arena with explosives and plans to blow it up at the end of the game, while having hundreds of millions of dollars wired into several offshore accounts.

A spat between Tyler and Emily causes Emily to run off before getting kidnapped by Carla, who has disguised herself as the Penguin's mascot Iceburgh after killing the original performer. Carla puts Emily with the other hostages about to be executed. Darren orders Tyler to stay in his seat while he goes to search for Emily. Carla is about to kill Darren, but he evades her attacks in a fight and kills her. Afterward, Darren asks for a security guard's help, but the guard is another disguised terrorist and reveals their criminal operation before Darren kills him. Now aware of the situation, Darren finds a mobile phone in the executive offices and uses it to contact Secret Service Agent Matthew Hallmark; Hallmark advises Darren to stand by while the agents take charge. He angrily refuses, saying that he will handle this himself.

The Secret Service and the Pittsburgh Bureau of Police team up to surround the arena, and a standoff ensues. Meanwhile, Darren manages to locate and disarm several of the bombs. Foss, meanwhile, kills several hostages during the first and second intermissions. Hallmark finally makes his way inside and meets Darren, who explains where the rest of the bombs are most likely located. Hallmark is seen to be in league with Foss and tries to kidnap Tyler, but fails. Hallmark then reveals himself to Darren, who sets him on fire and ultimately kills him. Darren then uses Hallmark's phone to contact Foss, who taunts that he is holding his daughter captive.

As the third period ticks down, Darren disables more bombs but is slowed by confrontations with Foss' men. At one point, Darren, dressed as the Pittsburgh goalie to escape the thugs, enters the game and successfully defends a shot on goal. Luc Robitaille scores the game-tying goal for Pittsburgh at the last second, prompting sudden death overtime, prolonging the game. Deciding that there's no time left to find the remaining bombs, Darren climbs to the roof of the arena. He fights off two of Foss' henchmen, one of whom falls onto the scoreboard, blowing it up. As the arena erupts into chaos, Darren advances upon the owner's box from above and forces his way in, rescuing Emily, the Vice President, and the remaining hostages. Darren and Emily reunite with Tyler and set out to leave the arena.

Foss manages to escape and blends in with the panicking crowd. He sets off one of the bombs, flooding part of the arena, and recaptures Emily when she recognizes him. The pair heads toward the top of the arena, where a helicopter is waiting to lift Foss away. Darren intervenes and saves his daughter before Foss can shoot her. As Foss attempts to flee, Darren shoots the pilot, causing the helicopter to stall and then to fall into the arena where it explodes on impact with the ice, killing Foss. Darren is led to a waiting medic unit while his children tell the paramedics of his heroism.

== Cast ==
- Jean-Claude Van Damme as Darren McCord, Civic Arena fire marshal
- Powers Boothe as Joshua Foss, the leader of the terrorists formerly associated with the CIA
- Raymond J. Barry as U.S. Vice President Daniel Bender
- Dorian Harewood as Matthew Hallmark, a Secret Service agent in charge of Bender's protection
- Whittni Wright as Emily McCord, Darren's daughter
- Ross Malinger as Tyler McCord, Darren's son
- Michael Gaston as Hickey, Foss' computer hacker
- Faith Minton as Carla, Foss' henchwoman
- Paul Mochnick as Andrew Ferrara, Civic Arena chef
- Audra Lindley as Angeline Ferrara, Andrew's wife
- Jack Erdie as Scratch, one of Foss' main henchmen
- Kate McNeil as Kathi McCord, Darren's ex-wife
- Jeff Howell as Usborn
- Raymond Laine as Mullard
- Kane Hodder as Murphy
- Brian Smrz as Demsky

Penguins staff includes Ed Evanko as team owner Baldwin, and Bernard Canepari as equipment manager Jefferson. Arena personnel include Bill Dalzell as head of security George Spota, Steve Aranson as scoreboard operator Dooley and Jennifer D. Bowser as mascot entertainer Joan Cometti. Additional law enforcement personnel include Brian Delate as Secret Service agent Thomas Blair, and Milton E. Thompson as Pittsburgh Police Dispatch Sergeant Kurtz. Other members of Foss' gang include Jophery Brown as Wootton, Jeff Habberstad as Lewis, John Hateley as Briggs, Fred Mancuso as Billy Pratt, Brad Moniz as Toowey, Manny Perry as Brody, Thomas Saccio as his helicopter pilot, Fred Waugh as Bluto, and Dean E. Wells as Kloner.

=== Hockey figures ===
- Pat Brisson as an unnamed player
- Jay Caufield as Brad Tolliver, the Penguins' fictional starting goaltender
- Bill Clement as pre-game announcer
- Ian Moran as Chris Chelios
- Jeff Jimerson as himself (credited "Anthem Singer")
- Mike Lange as himself (credited "Play-by-Play Announcer")
- Luc Robitaille as himself
- Paul Steigerwald as himself (credited "Color Commentator")
- Markus Näslund as himself (uncredited)
- Bernie Nicholls as himself (uncredited)
- Ken Wregget as himself (uncredited)
- John Barbero as PA announcer (uncredited)
- Mark Kachowski as Beaumont

== Production ==
=== Development, writing and casting ===
The film's pitch came from Karen Baldwin, the spouse of Penguins owner Howard Baldwin, who also served as one of the film's producers. It was inspired by the unique architecture of Pittsburgh's Civic Arena and its retractable roof, which she thought would make a spectacular setting for an action film. One plot point—the goalie disguise—was taken from an earlier, unproduced story by the Baldwins, where the hero used such a ruse to defect from the U.S.S.R. Writer Gene Quintano was commissioned to turn the pair's ideas into a full-fledged screenplay, initially under the title Arena.

Further elements, such as McCord's fight with the Penguins' mascot and the use of sign language, were absent from early drafts and added at the suggestion of director Peter Hyams after he joined the project. Luc Robitaille had attended acting classes with Karen Baldwin while playing for the Los Angeles Kings, and he was chosen as Tyler's favorite player based on that experience. It was the first film made by Howard Baldwin for Universal, with whom he signed a two-year development deal.

Arnold Schwarzenegger, Sylvester Stallone, and Bruce Willis were considered for the role of Darren McCord, but all three turned the role down before Jean-Claude Van Damme got the part. Schwarzenegger turned down the role because he had already filmed True Lies (1994) and Junior back to back. Stallone turned the role down because he didn't like the quality of the script. Willis turned the part down because he was already working on Die Hard with a Vengeance (1995). James Woods was originally considered for the role of Joshua Foss, but he turned down the part because he didn't like the direction of the character. That same year the film was released, Woods acted alongside Boothe in Nixon (1995).

=== Filming ===
Principal photography happened in the Pittsburgh area, where the film is set, in 98 days between August 29 and December 7, 1994. The majority of the shoot took place in and around Civic Arena. Another notable location was the then-unopened and now closed Veterans Hospital in nearby Aspinwall.

Baldwin wanted to use footage from the October 1 NHL season opener between the Penguins and the Chicago Blackhawks, but it was delayed due to the 1994–95 lockout. In its place, he arranged an exhibition game between the Penguins and their IHL affiliate the Cleveland Lumberjacks, but it did not display the correct intensity. So another game was staged, this time involving players from the Johnstown Chiefs (now the Greenville Swamp Rabbits) and Wheeling Thunderbirds (now Nailers, the Penguins' real-life ECHL affiliate) of the East Coast Hockey League. These were just for general hockey footage, however. More complex scenes were enacted by a group of former players assembled for the film, and kept on call for the entire duration of the shoot. To populate the arena, production used a combination of invited Penguins fans and paid extras, typically 2,000 to 3,000 but up to 10,000 in some scenes, and complemented them with cardboard cutouts (a common technique before CGI enhancing became the norm).

The final helicopter crash was filmed with a 400 ft crane that could pick up and lower the helicopter into the arena. Nine cameras recorded the event, which was filmed several times, and hundreds of emergency vehicles were on standby in case of an accident.

All of those hundreds of emergency vehicles used during this filming were actually ambulances and fire apparatus from the neighboring communities of Pittsburgh. As such, each ambulance and many of the fire units were officially licensed through the Pennsylvania Department of Health, and each was fully staffed with a complete crew of both emergency medical technicians as well as paramedics, respectively.

== Release ==
The film was theatrically released on December 22, 1995. A home video release followed on June 11, 1996.

== Reception ==
=== Box office ===
Sudden Death opened in the United States on December 22, 1995, its relatively modest 1,681-screen release reflecting a crowded Christmas marketplace. It ended the weekend in eighth place, making $4,782,445 for a poor $2,845 per screen average. Its final domestic tally was $20,350,171. Internationally the film fared better, bringing its worldwide gross to $64.4 million (equivalent to $126 million in 2023 when adjusted for inflation).

=== Home media ===
The film made its domestic home video debut on a 1996 VHS published by MCA/Universal Home Video, with the DVD arriving the following year under the newly renamed Universal Home Video label. Universal re-issued the film on standard Blu-ray in 2013, and a 4K UHD Blu-ray released 27 August 2024 from Kino Lorber, struck from a brand new remaster.

=== Critical response ===
On Rotten Tomatoes, the film has an approval rating of 53% based on 38 reviews. The website's consensus states "Sudden Death may not be a classic, but exciting set pieces and strong work from Jean-Claude Van Damme help this action thriller pay off part of its Die Hard debt." Audiences polled by CinemaScore gave the film an average grade of "B+" on an A+ to F scale.

Sudden Death was widely praised for its action and spectacle. Mick LaSalle of the San Francisco Chronicle hailed it as "one of the best action thrillers of 1995 [and] the film Jean-Claude Van Damme has been building up to for 10 years, marking his arrival as a top-flight action star". Kevin Thomas of the Los Angeles Times called it as "A treat for Jean-Claude Van Damme fans, a superior action thriller loaded with jaw-dropping stunts and special effects, and strong in production values."

However, the film received criticism for its extravagant narrative contrivances and excessive violence. Chris Hicks of the Deseret News conceded that "Hyams [...] knows how to keep the action popping and there are some dramatically intense scenes", but complained that the picture was "far too sadistic" and that the finale "must be seen to be believed". Bruce Fretts of Entertainment Weekly thought the film wanted to be a "comical Die Hard knockoff" but criticized the director for "inept editing and a plodding pace", as well as "mindnumbing violence". He gave it a D− grade.

Among moderate reviews, TV Guide gave it 2 out of 4 and called it "Good clean fun, with just the right ratio of explosions to dialogue." Roger Ebert of the Chicago Sun-Times gave the film two and half stars out of four and stated that "Sudden Death isn't about common sense. It's about the manipulation of action and special-effects sequences to create a thriller effect, and at that it's pretty good." On At the Movies, Ebert's colleague Gene Siskel praised the film's fun set pieces, especially the fight with kitchen implements, though he wished James Woods would have been cast as the villain instead of Powers Boothe. He echoed Ebert's "thumbs up."

=== Retrospective ===
Collider and Moviefone both mentioned Sudden Death in their chronological list of the greatest action films of the 1990s. Entertainment.ie listed Sudden Death at 76 on their 2019 list of the greatest action films of all time. In a list of action films that did something better than Die Hard, Screen Rant praised Sudden Death's superior setpieces.

== Novelization ==
Sudden Death
- Author: Stephen Mertz
- Language: English
- Genre: Thriller
- Publisher: Boulevard Books
- Publication date: 1995
- Publication place: United States
- Media type: Print (Paperback)
- Pages: 218 pp
- ISBN: 1-57297-032-4
- OCLC: 33266093

The novelization of the film was written by American novelist Stephen Mertz, and published by Boulevard Books. An audiobook version was produced, which is read by the film's co-star Powers Boothe.

== Soundtrack ==
Sudden Death: Original Motion Picture Soundtrack

Film score by John Debney
- Released: 10 October 1995
- Genre: Orchestral
- Length: 30:26
- Label: Varèse Sarabande
- Producer: John Debney

John Debney chronology
Houseguest (1995)	Sudden Death (1995)	Cutthroat Island (1995)

Sudden Death's score was composed and produced by John Debney. A selection of Debney's tracks was released on CD by film music label Varèse Sarabande shortly before the film's release date, and has since become available in digital format. In 2024, Varèse Sarabande re-released the soundtrack, this time included the whole scoring session remastered from the original archives.

Track listing (1995 Original Release)
No.	Title	Length
1.	"Main Title / Kitchen Fight"	5:31
2.	"Finding The Bombs"	2:29
3.	"Seeing Tyler"	0:59
4.	"Locker Room Chase"	2:28
5.	"Choppers / Scaling The Dome"	4:01
6.	"Race Against The Clock / The Abduction"	6:36
7.	"Countdown"	0:44
8.	"Rooftop Battle"	5:26
9.	"Chopper Explodes / Resolution"	2:02
Total length:		30:26

Track listing (2024 Deluxe edition)
No.	Title	Length
1.	"Sudden Death (Main Title)"	3:06
2.	"Game Day/Roadblock/Grand Theft Auto (Suite)"	0:51
3.	"Preperations"	1:24
4.	"The Kitchen/Mrs. Ferrara Gets a Visitor/Badge Men (Suite)"	1:35
5.	"Loading Dock/Vice President Arrives/New Assistants (Suite)"	1:26
6.	"The Action/The Dome Again (Suite)"	2:11
7.	"Emergency Response"	0:59
8.	"A Killing by the Numbers"	0:48
9.	"Emily Sees"	0:43
10.	"The Abduction of Emily"	2:12
11.	"Kitchen Fight"	3:00
12.	"Fight for the Bone"	1:23
13.	"Phone's Dead/The Feone (Suite)"	1:20
14.	"Not Alone/Building Weapons (Suite)"	0:59
15.	"Vantage Point"	1:29
16.	"The Roof/The Zamboni/A Dangerous Fireman (Suite)"	2:06
17.	"The Mayor Checks Out"	2:24
18.	"The Sign/Le Dome (Suite)"	0:51
19.	"The Materials at Hand/The Meeting (Suite)"	2:55
20.	"Flame Thrower/Looking for Bombs (Suite)"	3:13
21.	"Locker Room Chase/Darren Sees Tyler (Suite)"	3:50
22.	"To Sudden Death"	4:28
23.	"A Miracle/Scaling the Dome/Roof Fight (Suite)"	4:46
24.	"Through the Dome"	3:56
25.	"Panic in the Arena"	4:29
26.	"Foss's Escape Plan/Foss Flies Away (Suite)"	1:59
27.	"Foss Eats Ice"	2:03
28.	"Sudden Death (End Credits)"	4:05
Total length:		64:17

== Legacy ==
Sudden Death was the first in an informal series of hockey-themed theatrical and television films produced by the Baldwins, which includes Mystery, Alaska, Mr. Hockey: The Gordie Howe Story, Odd Man Rush (and its less hockey-centric sequel Discussion Materials), as well as the proposed Harlem Saints.

Peter Hyams has maintained an association with producer Moshe Diamant over the years, but did not collaborate with Van Damme again until serving as cinematographer on two Universal Soldier sequels, Regeneration (2009) and Day of Reckoning (2012), which were directed by his son John. Sudden Death scribe Gene Quintano contributed extensive rewrites to the former. The elder Hyams returned to the director's chair for a third Van Damme vehicle, Enemies Closer, in 2013. While these movies did not enjoy the wide releases given to Timecop and Sudden Death, they were well received among a circle of critics, their sparse and downbeat atmosphere prompting discussions about auteurism in the largely commercial medium of direct-to-video action films.

The 2018 British film Final Score is widely considered to have been influenced by Sudden Death. In it, the hero played by Dave Bautista battles terrorists against the backdrop of a closely contested soccer game. He must neutralize them before the game's 90 minutes run out, or innocent spectators and his putative goddaughter will die. It was released on September 7, 2018, to a mostly positive reception.

=== Remake ===
A remake titled Welcome to Sudden Death was in production from both Universal 1440 and Netflix. The film stars Michael Jai White and Gary Owen in a more comedic take on the material. It was released on September 29, 2020, to mostly negative reviews.

== See also ==
- List of films about ice hockey
