= Bull Run (film) =

2024 film by Alfredo Barrios, Jr.

- Release poster
- Directed by: Alfredo Barrios, Jr.
- Written by: Alfredo Barrios, Jr. and Bill Keenan
- Based on: Discussion Materials by Bill Keenan
- Produced by: Howard Baldwin; Karen E. Baldwin; Doug Ellin; Andrew Sugerman; Bill Keenan; Bill Immerman
- Starring: Tom Blyth; Chris Diamantopoulos; Jay Mohr; Troy Garity; Zach Villa; Jordyn Denning
- Cinematography: David Newbert
- Edited by: Ethan Maniquis
- Distributed by: Vertical
- Release dates: October 19, 2024 (NBFF); November 14, 2025 (United States)
- Running time: 97 minutes
- Country: United States
- Language: English

Bull Run is a 2024 American comedy film directed by Alfredo Barrios, Jr. and produced by Doug Ellin, Howard Baldwin, Karen Baldwin and Bill Keenan. Based on Bill Keenan's 2020 bestselling memoir, Discussion Materials, the film stars Tom Blyth as Bobby Sanders, a former ice-hockey player working on Wall Street. It also stars Chris Diamantopoulos and Jay Mohr.

It premiered at the Newport Beach Film Festival on October 19, 2024. The film was released by Vertical in theaters and VOD on November 14, 2025.

Bull Run is the sequel to Odd Man Rush which was released by Hulu in 2020.

== Synopsis ==
In the wilds of Wall Street, Bobby Sanders, a junior banker, discovers that the only thing more dangerous than billion-dollar deals are the men signing them.

== Reception ==
The film received mixed reviews. Troy Anderson of AndersonVision argued that although he was initially skeptical about whether the film would have anything new to say, "What distinguishes Bull Run is its willingness to embrace genuine weirdness rather than simply documenting corruption, to suggest that beneath the aggressively masculine surface of Wall Street culture operates something closer to collective psychological illness than rational economic calculation."

Bitesize Breakdown said, "Smashing their foot on the pedal allows the cast to speed-talk through charming dialogues and monologues, have fun with not-too-vulgar schemes, and keep audiences engaged even if we can't keep up with every interweaving plotline. Ultimately feeling more like Office Space than The Wolf of Wall Street, Bull Run is a surprisingly fun little film.

James Harrison from Film Authority said, "Dry, salacious and witty, Bull Run isn't just about the finance behind...pesticides and solar panels, although it's quite educational on all these subjects, but actually has a thriller element to it."

Screen Rant said, "it almost feels like it was an assignment in a bad film class".
