= Bill Keenan =

American writer and ice hockey player

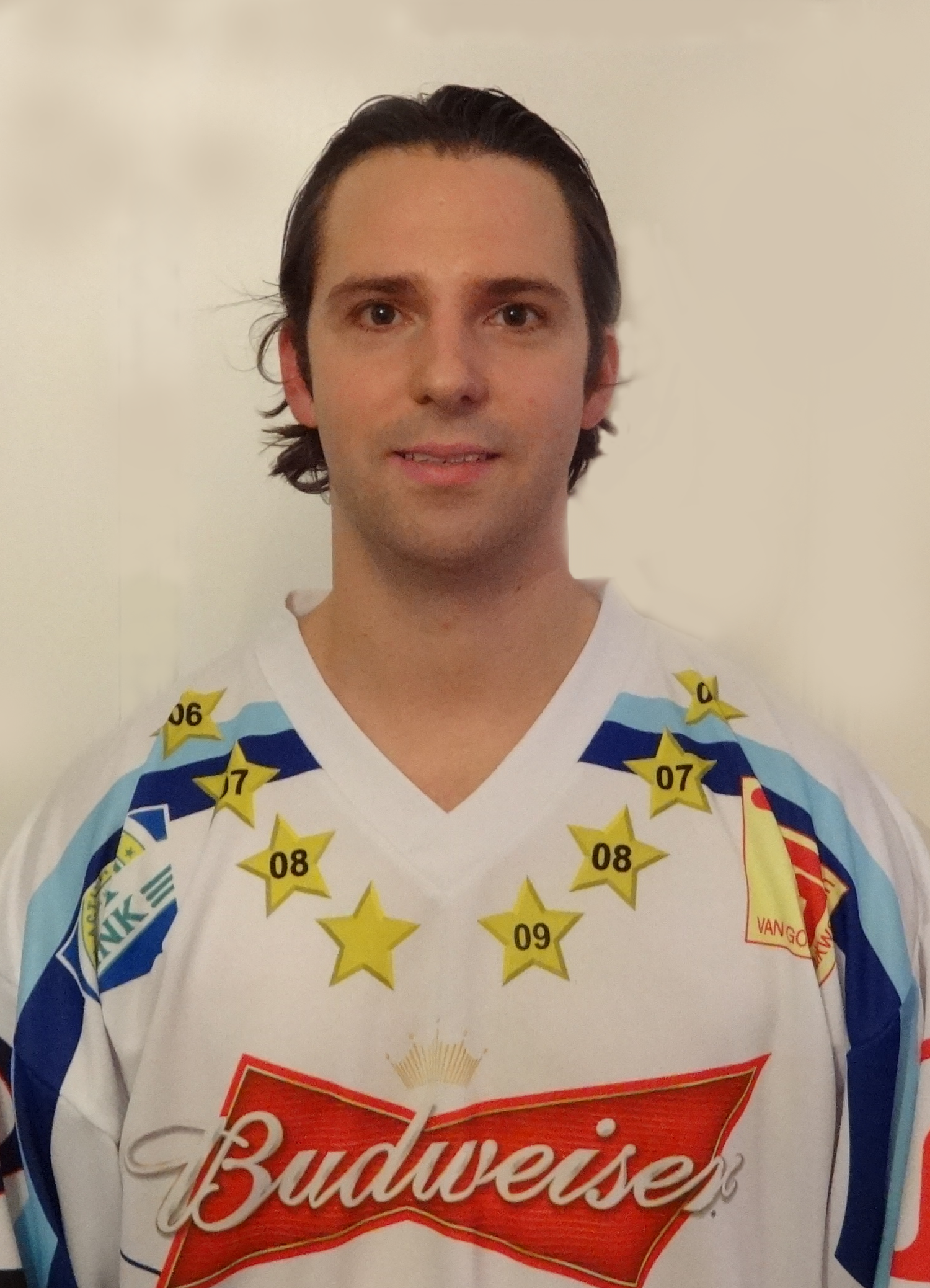
- Born: April 15, 1986 (age 40) New York, New York, U.S.
- Height: 6 ft 1 in (185 cm)
- Weight: 187 lb (85 kg; 13 st 5 lb)
- Position: Right wing
- Shot: Right
- Played for: IF Sundsvall; Kramfors-Alliansen; HC Vita Hästen; Lindlövens IF; EHC Neuwied; White Caps Turnhout
- Playing career: 2009–2012

William Howard Keenan III (born April 15, 1986 in New York, New York) is an American author, screenwriter, playwright, and former professional ice hockey player who last played for IF Sundsvall of HockeyAllsvenskan. As of February 2019, he has served as chief operating officer of Graydon Carter's Air Mail.

== Early life and education ==
Keenan was born and raised in Manhattan's Upper East Side. He is an alum of St. Bernard's School and Collegiate School. Keenan graduated from Harvard University in 2009 and received his MBA from Columbia Business School in 2016.

== Ice hockey ==
=== Early career ===
He played youth hockey for the Connecticut Yankees 1986 team which featured Jonathan Quick, Matt Lashoff, Rob Schremp, and Sean Backman. The team was coached by Sean's father, former New York Ranger Mike Backman.

Keenan played for the New York Apple Core of the Eastern Junior Hockey League from 2003-2005. He was voted an EJHL All Star during the 2004-05 season along with his Apple Core teammate Matt Gilroy. Keenan was originally drafted by the Hull Olympiques of the QMJHL but opted to forego major junior hockey and pursue the NCAA route. On December 4, 2004 he committed to play his collegiate hockey at Harvard University. He was ranked #207 among North American skaters in the 2005 NHL Central Scouting Bureau rankings.

=== College career ===
Keenan made his collegiate debut on November 5, 2005 against Princeton University at Baker Rink. He scored his first collegiate goal against St. Lawrence University on November 4, 2006 against Alex Petizian at the Bright Arena. Keenan was hampered by numerous injuries in college. He was a college roommate of professional soccer player Mike Fucito.

=== Professional career ===
After a short stint playing for the Turnhout White Caps of the Belgian first division, Keenan signed with EHC Neuwied of the German Oberliga for the remainder of the 2009-10 season. He tallied 15 goals and 14 assists in 14 games played.

Keenan began the pre-season playing with Kiekko-Laser in the Finnish Mestis. On September 11, 2010, he signed a contract with Lindlövens IF of the Swedish Division 1. He went on to record 8 goals and 2 assists in 32 games.

On August 13, 2011 Keenan reportedly signed a one-year contract with Kramfors-Alliansen of Hockeyettan. It was also rumored he had agreed on a contract with HC Vita Hästen. On October 19, 2011 in a game against Östersunds IK, Keenan delivered a check to current Frölunda HC defenseman Emil Djuse. Keenan was suspended five games for an illegal check to the head. Playing alongside forward Johan Chang, Keenan produced 22 goals, 28 assists for 50 points while racking up 117 penalty minutes in 32 games while Chang piled up 28 goals and 37 assists for 65 points in 40 games. Keenan finished second among North Americans in league scoring behind Andrew Fournier. Teammate and fellow American Dean Moore finished first among defenseman in scoring. Keenan also finished second among North Americans in penalty minutes. Following the season, Kramfors-Alliansen transferred both Keenan and Moore's rights to IF Sundsvall of HockeyAllsvenskan before signing forward Mike Danton to a one-year contract.

=== Career statistics ===
			Regular season					Playoffs
Season	Team	League	GP	G	A	Pts	PIM	GP	G	A	Pts	PIM
2009–10	White Caps Turnhout	Eredivisie	2	1	4	5	4	-	-	-	-	-
2009-10	EHC Neuwied	Oberliga	-	-	-	-	-	14	15	14	29	28
2010–11	Kiekko-Laser	Mestis	2	1	1	2	2	-	-	-	-	-
2010-11	Lindlovens IF	SWE-3	32	8	2	10	40	-	-	-	-	-
2011-12	Kramfors-Alliansen	SWE-3	34	22	28	50	117	-	-	-	-	-
2012-13	IF Sundsvall	SWE-2	-	-	-	-	-	-	-	-	-	-

== Writing ==
Keenan's first book, Odd Man Rush: A Harvard Kid's Hockey Odyssey from Central Park to Somewhere in Sweden—with Stops along the Way, was published by Skyhorse Publishing in January 2016. Vanity Fair published an excerpt from the book in December 2015 calling it "an uproarious new memoir." The Boston Globe reviewed the book, saying "Odd Man Rush is a unique item on the bookshelf...Keenan understands the culture [of hockey] and captures it well." The Buffalo News called it "Ball Four meets hockey." The New York Post called it "a bawdy, often comical chronicle of hockey and survival in far-flung places...the international version of the movie Slap Shot." SB Nation reviewed it, stating "Make no mistake. This is a funny book, but Keenan also has a gift for writing from a place of vulnerability...That being said, you will still find yourself smirking your way through most of Keenan's story."

Academy Award-nominated producer Howard Baldwin acquired the film rights to Odd Man Rush, and the project was reported to be in production in February 2019. The Athletic reported the film was in post-production in August 2019 with Creative Artists Agency representing the movie's distribution rights. The film, starring Jack Mulhern, Dylan Playfair, and Trevor Gretzky, was released on Hulu in 2020.

Post Hill Press published his second book, Discussion Materials: Tales of a Rookie Wall Street Investment Banker. In 2022, a film adaptation of Discussion Materials was announced starring Tom Blyth of The Hunger Games, Silicon Valley's Chris Diamantopoulos, and Jay Mohr.

His resignation email from Deutsche Bank went viral and was published by Dealbreaker.

His debut play, Spin Cycle, premiered Off-Broadway at the Hudson Guild Theatre in July 2025. It was subsequently produced at The Flea Theater and by the Trinity Theatre Company as part of their 2026 New Works Festival.

His first two novels, The Swan and The Sentinel and The House on Ember Row were published in 2026.

Keenan served as a producer on Alex Goyette's feature, Breeder, which will premiere at the 2026 Tribeca Film Festival.

== Business Career ==
Upon completion of his MBA in 2016, he joined Deutsche Bank's investment banking division. He then became COO of the digital media start-up Air Mail founded by Graydon Carter and Alessandra Stanley. Air Mail was backed by TPG Capital, Standard Industries, and RedBird Capital Partners. In September 2025, it was acquired by Puck.

== Personal life ==
Keenan's younger sister is American show jumping rider Lillie Keenan.

In March 2026, he married New York City Ballet soloist Olivia MacKinnon.

== Works ==
=== Film ===
Year	Title	Director	Writer	Producer
2020	Odd Man Rush	No	Yes	Yes
2024	Bull Run	No	Yes	Yes
2026	Breeder	No	No	Yes

=== Theatre ===
Year	Title	Role
2025	Spin Cycle	Playwright
2026	The Hallway	Playwright
2026	Fully Furnished	Playwright

=== Books ===
- Odd Man Rush (2016), ISBN 1613218176
- Discussion Materials (2020), ISBN 1642934089
- The Swan and The Sentinel (2026), ISBN 979-8895655474
- The House on Ember Row (2026)
- Grizz (2026), co-written with Sawyer Bennett
