= Kim Severson =

American journalist

Kim Marie Severson
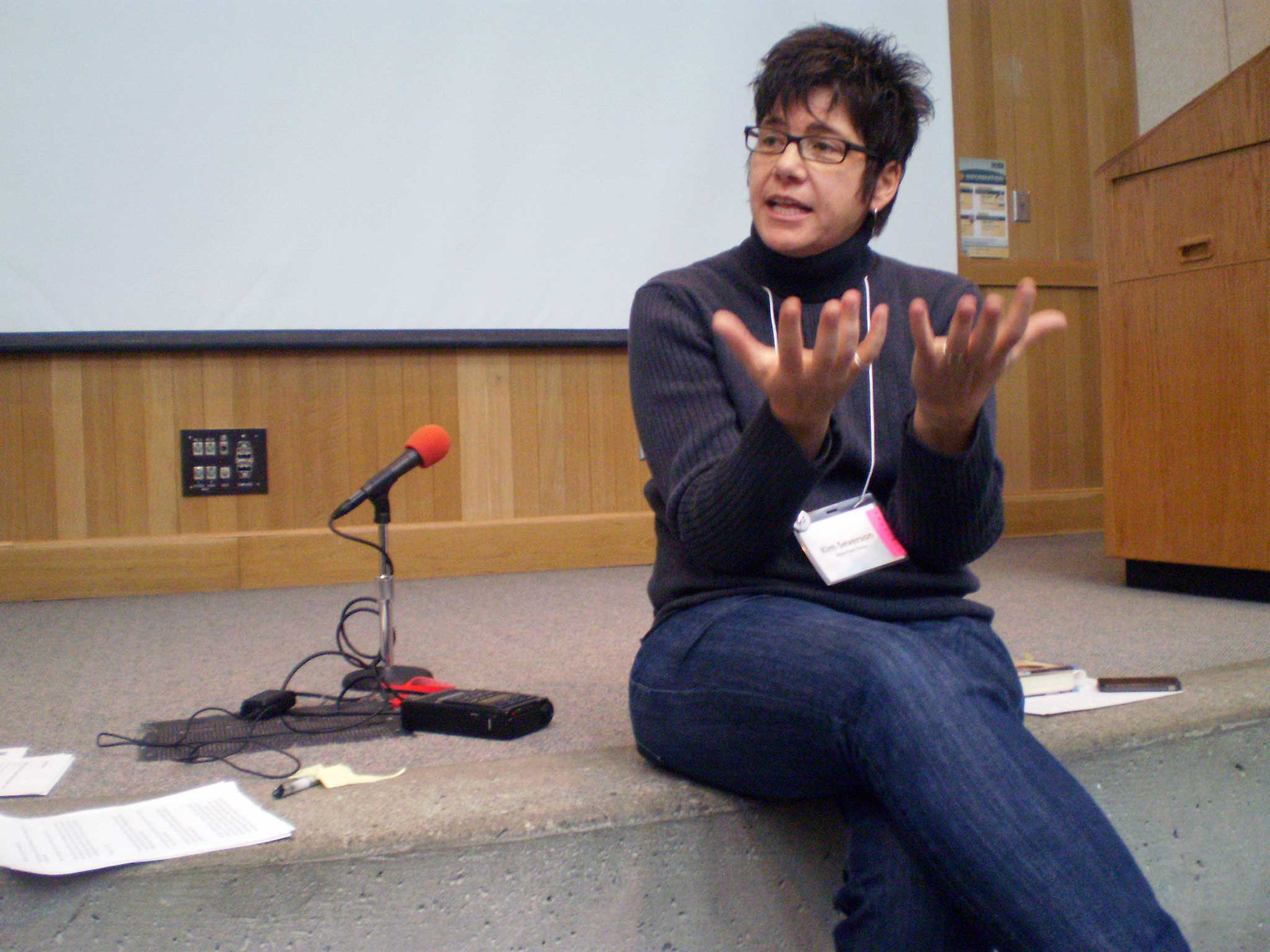
- Kim Severson speaks at the 2011 Alaska Press Club conference.
- Born: September 12, 1961 (age 65); Eau Claire, Wisconsin
- Occupation: Journalist
- Notable credit: The New York Times

Kim Marie Severson (born September 12, 1961) is a reporter for The New York Times. She won a Pulitzer Prize for Public Service in 2018 as part of The New York Times coverage of sexual harassment and abuse and is a four-time James Beard award–winner for food writing. Severson has published multiple cookbooks and a cooking themed memoir.

Severson wrote for the Anchorage Daily News 1991–1998 as a features writer. She wrote for the San Francisco Chronicle's food section from 1999 to 2004. She joined the New York Times in 2004. Severson covered sexual harassment in the restaurant industry for the New York Times; the paper received the 2018 Pulitzer Prize for Public Service for coverage on sexual harassment.

== Biography ==
Severson worked for the Anchorage Daily News from 1991 to 1998 as a features writer. Severson wrote for the San Francisco Chronicle's food section around 1999–2005. She joined The New York Times in 2004. In 2010, she became the Atlanta bureau chief for the Times. In 2014, she joined the Times's new digital cooking initiative and began reporting on national food news and trends.

At present, Severson's New York Times author profile says that Severson reports on national food news and culture, and contributes to NYT Cooking.

Severson's most recent book, Cook Fight, was co-authored with Julia Moskin, a New York Times food writer, and was published by Ecco Press, an imprint of HarperCollins, in 2012. Her memoir, Spoon Fed: How Eight Cooks Saved My Life, was published by Riverhead Press on April 15, 2010. A new edition of her first cookbook, The New Alaska Cookbook, came out in June 2009. Her first book, The Trans Fat Solution: Cooking and Shopping to Eliminate the Deadliest Fat from Your Diet, was published by Ten Speed Press in 2003.

Severson served as vice-president of the National Gay and Lesbian Journalists Association. She has written about the economic and cultural impact of being a lesbian without the benefits of legal marriage.

== Awards ==
Severson's James Beard awards are for:

1. 2000 Winner in Newspaper Feature Writing About Restaurants and/or Chefs. "The Rise and Fall of a Star: How the King of California Cuisine Lost an Empire"
2. 2003 Winner in Newspaper Series: "The Most American of Meals Draws Rookies: The Bay Area's Worst Cooks Vie for a Chance to Learn with a Pro", "The Challenge Begins: Our Winner Learns to Plan, Shop, and Prep", "Countdown to Thanksgiving: Our Training Camp Recruit Tackles the Turkey"
3. 2003 Winner: Newspaper Feature Writing Without Recipes. San Francisco Chronicle. "High Stakes: Bay Area at the Forefront of the Big-Bucks Battle Between Backers of Grass-Fed Beef and Traditional Cattlemen"
4. 2004 Winner: Newspaper Feature Writing Without Recipes. San Francisco Chronicle. "A Lot of Cooks in the MRE Kitchen"
5. 2018 Nominee in Investigative Reporting, New York Times: "Ken Friedman, Power Restaurateur, is Accused of Sexual Harassment"

Severson won a Pulitzer Prize for public service in 2018 as part of The New York Times coverage of sexual harassment and abuse in the spheres of Hollywood, politics, the media and restaurants. She has won four James Beard awards for food writing. She also won the Casey Medal for Meritorious Journalism for her San Francisco Chronicle work, along with fellow reporter Meredith May, on childhood obesity in 2002.

== Personal ==
As of 2016, Severson lives in Atlanta, Georgia, and has one child.

Severson affirmed her partnership with Katia Emilia Hetter in 2006. The two divorced in 2012.

== Bibliography ==
- (2003) The Trans Fat Solution: Cooking and Shopping to Eliminate the Deadliest Fat from Your Diet
- (2009) The New Alaska Cookbook
- (2010) Spoon Fed: How Eight Cooks Saved My Life
- (2012) CookFight, with Julia Moskin (ISBN 978-0061988387)

== See also ==
- Pulitzer Prize for Public Service
