= The Fourth Kind =

2009 science fiction thriller film directed by Olatunde Osunsanmi

- Theatrical release poster
- Directed by: Olatunde Osunsanmi
- Screenplay by: Olatunde Osunsanmi
- Story by: Olatunde Osunsanmi; Terry Lee Robbins
- Produced by: Paul Brooks; Joe Carnahan
- Starring: Milla Jovovich; Elias Koteas; Corey Johnson; Will Patton; Charlotte Milchard; Mia McKenna-Bruce; Julian Vergov
- Cinematography: Lorenzo Senatore
- Edited by: Paul Covington
- Music by: Atli Örvarsson
- Production companies: Gold Circle Films; Dead Crow Productions; Focus Films
- Distributed by: Universal Pictures (United States); Mandate Pictures (International)
- Release dates: October 24, 2009 (Screamfest); November 6, 2009 (U.S.)
- Running time: 98 minutes
- Countries: United States; United Kingdom
- Language: English
- Budget: $10 million
- Box office: $49.5 million

The Fourth Kind is a 2009 science fiction horror thriller film written and directed by Olatunde Osunsanmi and starring Milla Jovovich, Elias Koteas, Corey Johnson, Will Patton, Charlotte Milchard, Mia McKenna-Bruce, Julian Vergov, and Osunsanmi. The title is derived from the expansion of J. Allen Hynek's classification of close encounters with aliens, in which the fourth kind denotes alien abductions.

The film is a pseudodocumentary, purporting to be a dramatic re-enactment of true events that occurred in Nome, Alaska, in which a psychologist uses hypnosis to uncover memories of alien abduction from her patients and finds evidence suggesting that she may have been abducted as well. At the beginning of the film, Jovovich informs the audience this entire movie is actually real, that she will be playing a character based on a real person named Abigail Tyler, and that the film will feature archival footage of the real Tyler. The "Abigail Tyler" seen in the archival footage is played by Milchard, and at various points throughout the film, the archival footage scenes and accompanying dramatic re-enactments are presented side by side. Director Osunsanmi appears in the film himself as the interviewer of the "real" Tyler.

The Fourth Kind premiered at the Screamfest Horror Film Festival on October 24, 2009, before opening theatrically in the United States and United Kingdom on November 6, 2009. The film's marketing campaign, which featured fake news articles attributed to real Alaskan news outlets, drew notable controversy and resulted in the studio being sued, ending with a $20,000 settlement paid to the Alaska Press Club. The film received unfavorable reviews from critics but was a modest box-office success, grossing $49.5 million worldwide. The film has gone on to attain a cult following in the years since its release.

== Plot ==
Chapman University hosts a televised interview with psychologist Dr. Abigail "Abbey" Tyler, who describes a series of events that occurred in Nome, Alaska, and culminated in an alleged alien abduction in October 2000.

In a re-enactment of events occurring in August 2000, Abbey's husband, Will, is murdered, leaving her to raise their two children, Ashley and Ronnie. Abbey tapes clinical hypnotherapy sessions with patients with shared experiences of a white owl staring at them as they sleep before creatures attempt to enter their homes. That night, Abbey is called by the police because one of her patients is holding his wife and two children at gunpoint. He states that he remembers everything and asks what "Zimabu Eter" means. Despite Abbey's pleas, he murders his family and commits suicide.

Abbey suspects that these patients may have been victims of an alien abduction. There is evidence that she may have been abducted as well, when an assistant gives her a tape recorder that plays the sound of something entering her home and attacking her. The attacker speaks an unknown language, and Abbey has no memory of the incident. Abel Campos, a colleague from Anchorage, is suspicious of the claims. Abbey calls upon Dr. Awolowa Odusami, a specialist in ancient languages and a contact of her late husband, to identify the language on the tape. Odusami identifies it as Sumerian.

Another patient, Scott, wishes to communicate. He admits that there was no owl and speaks of "them", but cannot remember anything further and begs Abbey to come to his home to hypnotize him. Under hypnosis, he begins hovering above his bed, while a voice speaking through Scott orders Abbey in Sumerian to end her study. Town sheriff August later arrives, telling her that Scott is paralyzed from the neck down. Believing Abbey to be responsible, August tries to arrest her, though Campos comes to Abbey's defense and confirms her story. August instead places Abbey under guard inside her house.

A police officer watches Abbey's house when a large saucer-shaped object appears in the sky. The image distorts, but the officer is heard describing people being pulled out of the house and calling for backup. Deputies rush into the house, finding Ronnie and Abbey, who say Ashley was taken. A disbelieving and enraged August accuses Abbey of kidnapping and removes Ronnie from her custody.

Sometime later, Abbey undergoes hypnosis in an attempt to make contact with the beings responsible and reunite with her daughter. Hypnotized, Abbey recalls that she witnessed Ashley's abduction, and she was abducted as well. An alien presence communicates with Abbey, who begs for Ashley's return. It states Ashley will never come back before referring to itself as "God". When the encounter ends, Campos and Odusami rush over to the now unconscious Abbey and then notice something offscreen. The image distorts again as a voice yells "Zimabu Eter!" before resolving to show that all three are gone. Abbey wakes up in a hospital with a broken neck. August reveals that Will had taken his own life, and Abbey's belief that he was murdered was a delusion.

The re-enactment ends, and back in the present, Abbey states that she, Campos, and Odusami were abducted during the hypnosis session, but cannot recall their experiences. She is asked how anyone can take her claims of alien abduction seriously if she was proven to be delusional about her husband's death. Abbey states that she has no choice but to believe that Ashley is still alive before breaking down in tears.

Abbey is cleared of all charges against her and leaves Alaska for the East Coast, where her health deteriorates to the point of requiring constant care. Campos remains a psychologist, and Odusami becomes a professor at a Canadian university. Both men and August refuse to be involved with the interview, while Ronnie remains estranged from Abbey, still blaming her for Ashley's disappearance.

== Cast ==
- Milla Jovovich as a re-enactment of Dr. Abigail "Abbey" Tyler
  - Charlotte Milchard, credited only as "Nome resident", portrays the "real" Dr. Abigail Emily Tyler.
- Will Patton as Sheriff August
- Hakeem Kae-Kazim as Awolowa Odusami
- Corey Johnson as Tommy Fisher
- Enzo Cilenti as Scott Stracinsky
- Elias Koteas as Abel Campos
- Eric Loren as Deputy Ryan
- Mia McKenna-Bruce as Ashley Tyler, Abbey's daughter
- Raphaël Coleman as Ronnie Tyler, Abbey's son
- Alisha Seaton as Theresa

In addition, Jovovich provides opening and dialogue as herself, setting the pretext of the pseudo-documentary's "true" events; as a further pretext of the pseudo-documentary, "Dr. Abigail Emily Tyler" is shown in the closing tombstone credits as having "appeared" in the film. During the fictional "real" footage, the interviewer is played by the director-screenwriter of this entire endeavour, Olatunde Osunsanmi.

== Production ==
=== Development ===
This is the first major film by writer and director Olatunde Osunsanmi, who is a protégé of independent film director Joe Carnahan. The movie is set up as a re-enactment of allegedly original documentary footage. It also uses supposedly "never-before-seen archival footage" that is integrated into the film.

==== Basis ====
The film is loosely inspired by a series of real missing person cases on the west coast of Alaska along the Bering Strait, which did in fact prompt an investigation by the FBI. While the film suggests extraterrestrial abduction as a cause for the disappearances, the real investigation found alcohol use and frigid temperatures to be the cause of most of the reported incidents. Of the disappearances, nine individuals were never recovered.

=== Filming ===
The Fourth Kind was shot in Bulgaria and Squamish, British Columbia, Canada. The lush, mountainous setting of Nome in the film bears little resemblance to the actual Nome, Alaska, which sits amidst the fringes of the arctic tree line, where trees can only grow about 8 feet (2.4 m) tall due to the permafrost on the shore of the Bering Sea.

== Release ==
The Fourth Kind premiered at the Screamfest Horror Film Festival in Los Angeles on October 24, 2009, as the festival's closing film. It opened theatrically in the United States and United Kingdom two weeks later, on November 6, 2009.

=== Marketing ===
To promote the film, Universal Pictures created a website with fake news stories supposedly taken from real Alaska newspapers, including the Nome Nugget and the Fairbanks Daily News-Miner. The campaign drew controversy and the newspapers sued Universal, who admitted to using the names without permission. A settlement was soon reached in which Universal agreed to remove the fake stories and pay $20,000 to the Alaska Press Club and a $2,500 contribution to a scholarship fund for the Calista Corporation.

In the settlement, it was noted: "Universal agrees to the permanent disabling and removal of, and represents and warrants that it has already permanently disabled access to and removed from the Internet, all news articles."

=== Home media ===
Universal Pictures Home Entertainment released The Fourth Kind on DVD and Blu-ray on March 16, 2010. The film earned $9,626,544 in DVD sales, with an additional $974,737 in Blu-ray sales.

== Reception ==
=== Box office ===
The Fourth Kind earned $12,231,160 during its opening weekend at the U.S. box office across 2,527 theaters. In the United Kingdom, it grossed £851,000 during its opening weekend. By its second weekend, the film had grossed £1,813,458 at the British box office. The film remained in theatrical exhibition through January 2010, totaling $25,486,040 in box office receipts in the United States. The film's final worldwide gross was $49,486,874.

=== Critical response ===
The Fourth Kind received mainly negative reviews from critics. On the review aggregator website Rotten Tomatoes, 18% of 114 critics' reviews are positive, with an average rating of 3.5/10. The website's consensus reads: "While it boasts a handful of shocks, The Fourth Kind is hokey and clumsy and makes its close encounters seem eerily mundane." Metacritic, which uses a weighted average, assigned the film a score of 34 out of 100, based on 27 critics, indicating "generally unfavorable" reviews. Audiences polled by CinemaScore gave the film an average grade of "C+" on an A+ to F scale.

Critic Roger Ebert gave it one and a half stars out of four, comparing it unfavorably to Paranormal Activity and The Blair Witch Project, though he did praise Jovovich's performance. Stephen Holden of The New York Times panned the film as "a tediously dragged-out supernatural thriller with few chills, no satisfying payoff and many conceptual loose ends." Owen Gleiberman of Entertainment Weekly called the film "rote and listless," while Richard Corliss of Time wrote: "You’d do better downloading an old Art Bell show — say, the one about the guy who put an alien in his freezer — than investigating this evidence of subnormal activity."

Ian Buckwalter of NPR likened the film to a "cinematic version of a chain e-mail hoax," summarizing: "Osunsanmi makes a valiant effort to keep the ruse going, and some of his gambits... are nice touches. But The Fourth Kind's chief source of credibility is a presumably unintentional one: re-enactment dialogue so painfully stilted that the grainy "reality" video seems strikingly naturalistic in comparison." CNN reviewer Breanna Hare criticized The Fourth Kind for "marketing fiction as truth." Nome, Alaska Mayor Denise Michels called it "Hollywood hooey". According to Michels, "people need to realize that this is a science fiction thriller". Michels also compared the film to The Blair Witch Project, saying, "we're just hoping the message gets out that this is supposed to be for entertainment." According to the Anchorage Daily News, "Nomeites didn't much like the film exploiting unexplained disappearances of Northwest Alaskans, most of whom likely perished due to exposure to the harsh climate, as science fiction nonsense. The Alaska press liked even less the idea of news stories about unexplained disappearances in the Nome area being used to hype some "kind" of fake documentary".

Rick Groen of The Globe and Mail awarded the film a favorable 3 out of 4 star-rating, commending its clever construction and concluding: "When we figure it out, the solution seems thin and the puzzle disappointing. But that's the way with most puzzles and, besides, it's not really the point of The Fourth Kind. Rather, the mission here is to demonstrate how, in this explosive age of dubious information, cynicism can be quickly trumped by gullibility." Michael Gingold of Fangoria gave the film a favorable review, writing "for a viewer who walks in with the point of view that it’s all fictitious, and isn’t distracted by Osunsanmi’s editing-suite hocus-pocus, how does The Fourth Kind work on a basic creep-out level? Pretty well at a number of points." Jenna Busch of The Huffington Post also found the film effective, declaring it "one of the scariest things I've seen in years." Simon Abrams of Slant Magazine likened the film to an extended Unsolved Mysteries segment, noting that the film "let[s] your imagination run wild, just as the grainy real footage lets you see whatever monsters you want amid a blizzard of static-y snow. Osunsanmi knows that everybody secretly wants to believe and when it comes to giving the people what they want, he does not disappoint."

== Legacy ==
Despite receiving unfavorable reviews at the time of its release, The Fourth Kind has gone on to develop a cult following in the intervening years. Writer John Kenneth Muir wrote in Horror Films of 2000-2009 (2023): "Many critics [at the time] found the "dramatizations" of The Fourth Kind to be cumbersome, and the Hollywood scenes over-designed. Yet this is the crux of the issue; it's the point of the movie. It's a leitmotif."

Brendan Morrow, writing for Bloody Disgusting in 2016, commended the film's ambiguous depiction of extraterrestrial abductions, noting that the film "manages to make alien abductions terrifying, something that only a handful of movies have accomplished. It does so by applying to aliens the same principles that are usually applied to ghosts: they are kept off screen and ambiguous, and the audience never once sees a single alien."

While available for streaming on Netflix in 2023, the film went viral on social media platforms such as TikTok, with users remarking that the film had "traumatised" them and left them unable to sleep. In a 2024 list compiled by IndieWire, The Fourth Kind was ranked as the sixth-scariest alien film of all time.

== Sources ==
- Meehan, Paul (2023). Alien Abduction in the Cinema: A History from the 1950s to Today. Jefferson, North Carolina: McFarland. ISBN 978-1-476-64921-4.
- Muir, John Kenneth (2023). Horror Films of 2000-2009. Jefferson, North Carolina: McFarland. ISBN 978-1-476-64450-9.
