= Plainclothes (film) =

American drama film

- Theatrical release poster
- Directed by: Carmen Emmi
- Written by: Carmen Emmi
- Produced by: Colby Cote; Arthur Landon; Eric Podwall; Vanessa Pantley
- Starring: Tom Blyth; Russell Tovey; Maria Dizzia; Christian Cooke; Gabe Fazio; Amy Forsyth; John Bedford Lloyd; Darius Fraser; Alessandra Ford Balazs
- Cinematography: Ethan Palmer
- Edited by: Erik Vogt-Nilsen
- Music by: Emily Wells
- Production companies: Lorton Entertainment; Page 1 Entertainment; Mini Productions; Podwall Entertainment
- Distributed by: Magnolia Pictures (United States); Curzon Film (United Kingdom)
- Release dates: January 26, 2025 (Sundance); September 19, 2025 (United States); October 10, 2025 (United Kingdom)
- Running time: 96 minutes
- Countries: United States; United Kingdom
- Language: English
- Box office: $259,377

Plainclothes is a 2025 romantic thriller drama film directed by Carmen Emmi and starring Tom Blyth, Russell Tovey, Maria Dizzia, Christian Cooke, Gabe Fazio, Amy Forsyth, and John Bedford Lloyd. The film had its world premiere at the Sundance Film Festival on January 26, 2025, and was released in the United States on September 19, 2025.

== Plot ==
In 1990s upstate New York, Lucas Brennan, a plainclothes police officer, is assigned to an undercover sting operation targeting gay and bisexual men in shopping malls. He pretends to take part in public cruising, using looks and gestures to make men believe he is seeking an encounter, then leads them into restrooms where they are arrested by other officers for indecent exposure. Although this work is treated as routine policing, it increasingly troubles Lucas, who is himself struggling with his own attraction to men. His personal life is further affected by the recent death of his father, Gus, and strained family relationships.

During one operation, Lucas becomes attracted to Andrew Waters, an older man he's meant to arrest but instead lets go. Using the name "Gus", Lucas later contacts Andrew, and the two begin a secret affair that culminates in an intense sexual encounter at a plant nursery. Lucas becomes emotionally attached, while Andrew—a married pastor with children—insists their relationship remain brief and hidden.

The relationship ends when Andrew learns Lucas is a police officer and cuts off contact. Lucas then uses police records to locate Andrew and confronts him at his church, accidentally revealing the affair in front of Andrew's family and effectively outing him. The confrontation permanently ends the relationship and leaves Lucas increasingly isolated. Having quit the police force, he begins writing unsent letters to Andrew and withdraws from others, including his former fiancée Emily, who's aware of his bisexuality.

Several months later at a New Year's party, Lucas' mother Marie and his uncle Paul discover a letter Andrew wrote to "Gus", describing their relationship, and mistakenly believe it was addressed to Lucas' deceased father. Paul privately confides to Lucas his disgust to the belief that Gus was gay, resulting in an argument between the two of them: a physical altercation quickly ensues, culminating in a hysterical Lucas shoving his uncle out a window in front of all the guests. He then tearfully reveals to his mother that the letter was meant for him, thereby coming out to her.

== Cast ==
- Tom Blyth as Lucas Brennan
- Russell Tovey as Andrew Waters
- Maria Dizzia as Marie Brennan
- Christian Cooke as Ron
- Gabe Fazio as Uncle Paul
- Amy Forsyth as Emily
- John Bedford Lloyd as Lt. Sollars
- Darius Fraser as Jeff
- Alessandra Ford Balazs as Jessie
- Sam Asa Brownstein as Christian

== Production ==
The film marks the feature length directorial debut for Carmen Emmi, who also scripted the film. It is produced by Arthur Landon, Colby Cote and Eric Podwall for Page 1 Entertainment and the London-based Lorton Entertainment.

Russell Tovey and Tom Blyth were confirmed in the lead roles in March 2024. That month, Amy Forsyth and Christian Cooke also joined the cast, as well as Maria Dizzia, John Bedford Lloyd and Gabe Fazio. The film's score is by Emily Wells.

Filming began in Syracuse, New York in March 2024. First-look images from the set were released that month.

== Release ==
Plainclothes premiered in the U.S. Dramatic Competition of the Sundance Film Festival on January 26, 2025. In April 2025, Magnolia Pictures acquired distribution rights to the film. The film received a limited theatrical release in the United States on September 19, 2025. In June 2025, Curzon Film acquired the distribution rights to the film in the United Kingdom, and released it in the United Kingdom on October 10, 2025.

== Reception ==
=== Critical response ===
On the review aggregator website Rotten Tomatoes, 82% of 90 critics' reviews are positive, with an average rating of 7/10. The website's consensus reads: "This tension-filled coming out story marks a welcome debut for director Carmen Emmi, whose Plainclothes showcases the perils of love and the effects of isolation." Metacritic, which uses a weighted average, assigned the film a score of 65 out of 100, based on 13 critics, indicating "generally favorable" reviews.

=== Accolades ===
The film won the Special Jury Award for Ensemble Cast at the Sundance Film Festival.
