= Charlotte Milchard =

British actress (born 1977)

- Born: 13 December 1977 (age 48); Barking, London, England
- Education: Italia Conti Academy of Theatre Arts
- Occupation: Actress
- Years active: 2007–present
- Website: www.charlottemilchard.com

Charlotte Milchard (born 13 December 1977) is a British actress.

== Early life ==
Milchard was born in Barking, London but spent the early years of her childhood living in Asia when her father's work as a scientist led the family to travelling the majority of the world. She graduated from the Italia Conti Academy of Theatre Arts in 2000.

== Career ==
Milchard has received critical acclaim for her stage performances. She has also appeared in several films, most notably The Fourth Kind. Despite being poorly received by critics, the film was a moderate box office success, earning over US$47 million worldwide. Milchard also starred in Mindflesh, a film based on the novel White Light by William Scheinman. It won Best Horror at the Philadelphia Independent Film Festival, but failed to achieve a general release. In 2019, she won Best Supporting Actress at the National Film Awards for her role in the film Scott and Sid.

== Filmography ==
=== Film ===
Year	Title	Role
2007	Sunstroke	Mandy
2008	Mindflesh	The Guardian
2009	The Fourth Kind	Dr. Abigail Tyler
2011	Moon in Gemini	Sophie
2018	Scott and Sid	Karen

=== Television ===
Year	Title	Role
2014	That Thing That Happened	Xena

=== Awards and nominations ===
Charlotte Milchard was the winner of Best Supporting Actress for her role in the feature film Scott and Sid at the National Film Awards UK 2019.
