= John Barbero =

John Barbero (February 23, 1945 – July 26, 2010) was the longtime public address announcer for the Pittsburgh Penguins of the National Hockey League, a job he held for 36 years, Barbero also served as a principal for Waynesburg Central High School.

== Early years ==
=== Career in education ===
Barbero was a 1963 graduate of California High School, During his tenure there, he also served as president of student council, National Honor Society treasurer, and College Club vice president and homeroom president, among other things. He also was a member of Boy's Octet, Chorale and Spanish Clubs.

John went to Grove City College, where he majored in business administration. While at Grove City, he pursued a broadcasting career when he started working at the college radio station as well as a downtown FM station. In the summer of 1964, Barbero became employed by WESA radio in Charleroi, Pennsylvania. In order to continue his radio career at WESA, John transferred to Pennsylvania Western University – California.

While at WESA, Barbero served as play-by-play announcer for California Vulcans football. He also became the station's sports director and would broadcast football and basketball matchups each week throughout the Monongahela Valley Area. John then moved to WEEP radio in Pittsburgh to serve as the radio voice of the now-defunct Pittsburgh Pipers of the American Basketball Association. Due to traveling conflicts, Barbero took a hiatus from sports broadcasting. He decided to continue at Pennsylvania Western University – California, majoring in English while continuing his evening job with WESA. Soon after, Barbero hosted a weekly oldies radio show that aired on Saturdays. the show received a thousand phone calls for requests each week. Because of the show's popularity, John became host of a daily oldies show from 5 p.m. until the station signed off for the night. While his radio career grew, Barbero soon took part at valley dances at several night spots. John was honored to work with many of the day's stars.

Barbero graduated from Pennsylvania Western University – California in 1969. He was then hired by Monongahela School District as an English teacher. He also was honored with a master's degree as a reading specialist. John continued with his education when he moved to Duquesne University, where he received his elementary certifications. Barbero continued his English teaching career until 1976, when he was assigned as an acting assistant principal at Carroll Junior High School. Later that year, he accepted the position as an assistant principal at Waynesburg Central High School. In 1978, he was hired as the school's principal and remained at Waynesburg until he retired in 2003.

=== Involvement in softball ===
Barbero was also actively involved in the sport of softball. In 1963, John became the founder of the Roscoe Cairns Softball Team. During his time with the team, they captured a number of Monongahela Valley Slow Pitch championships. When the team's performance succeeded, John then formed a tournament team, which became popular throughout the nation. The team later rebranded as the California Eagles and later Lee Supply. As a manager and player, the team finished second three consecutive seasons in the world tournament and finished nine times as the top 10 team in the world. The team's success became well known throughout the world of softball and in honor of his many achievements, John became inducted into the Mid Mon Valley All Sports Hall of Fame on June 18, 2010. His father, the late Thomas Barbero, a longtime educator and sports official in the Mon Valley, was inducted into the Hall of Fame in 1958.

== Pittsburgh Penguins ==
Even though he retired from radio in 1973, Barbero remained in the announcing business. The NHL's Pittsburgh Penguins hired John as the team's public address announcer for their games at the Civic Arena. He held the position until 2009 and his voice could be heard occasionally on television promos and advertisements. Barbero also performed this duty in an uncredited role in the 1995 Jean-Claude Van Damme movie Sudden Death.

=== Brain tumor, 2009–10 season, and death ===
In February 2009, Barbero was diagnosed with Astrocytoma, an inoperable brain tumor. Even though he continued his PA announcing duties with the Penguins during the 2008–09 NHL season as well as the team's successful run in the 2009 Stanley Cup playoffs, he was unable to work during the 2009–10 season and was filled in for by voiceover specialist Ryan Mill. Barbero died on July 26, 2010, at the age of 65. Mill has succeeded Barbero as of the 2010–11 season.

=== Jágr's Jersey Retirement ===
On February 18, 2024 Barbero's voice Introduced Jaromír Jágr onto the ice during his Jersey Retirement ceremony.
