= The Fence (film) =

French drama film

- Theatrical release poster
- French: Le Cri des gardes
- Directed by: Claire Denis
- Screenplay by: Claire Denis; Suzanne Lindon; Andrew Litvack
- Based on: Black Battles with Dogs by Bernard-Marie Koltès
- Produced by: Olivier Delbosc; Gary Farkas; Clément Lepoutre; Olivier Muller; Vincent Maraval; Anthony Vaccarello
- Starring: Isaach de Bankolé; Matt Dillon; Mia McKenna-Bruce; Tom Blyth
- Cinematography: Éric Gautier
- Edited by: Guy Lecorne
- Music by: Tindersticks
- Production companies: Vixens; Curiosa Films; Saint Laurent Productions; Arte France Cinéma
- Distributed by: Les Films du Losange
- Release dates: 10 September 2025 (TIFF); 8 April 2026 (France)
- Running time: 107 minutes
- Country: France
- Languages: English; Yoruba

The Fence (French: Le Cri des gardes, lit. 'The Cry of the Guards') is a 2025 English-language French drama film directed by Claire Denis, co-written with Suzanne Lindon and Andrew Litvack, it is based on Bernard-Marie Koltès's play Black Battles with Dogs. It follows Alboury (Isaach de Bankolé), as he tries to uncover the truth about his brother's death at a mining site owned by Horn (Matt Dillon).

The film had its world premiere in the Special Presentations section of the 2025 Toronto International Film Festival on 10 September. It was theatrically released in France by Les Films du Losange on 8 April 2026.

== Cast ==
- Isaach de Bankolé as Alboury
- Matt Dillon as Horn
- Mia McKenna-Bruce as Leonie
- Tom Blyth as Cal
- Brian Begnan as Nouofia
- Moussa Thiam as Moses

== Production ==
=== Development ===
In June 2023, Denis announced she had just finished the screenplay for her next project and would be returning to Cameroon later that same month to scout for locations. In March 2024, she revealed the film would be titled The Fence. It is Denis third film set in West Africa, following Chocolat (1988) and White Material (2009).

The film is adapted from Bernard-Marie Koltès's play Black Battles with Dogs and was written by Claire Denis, Suzanne Lindon and Andrew Litvack. Denis is also director. It is produced by Vixens, Curiosa Films, Saint Laurent Productions and Arte France Cinéma.

The cast is led by Mia McKenna-Bruce, Matt Dillon, and Isaach de Bankolé, with McKenna-Bruce replacing Riley Keough in January 2025. That month, Tom Blyth joined the cast.

=== Filming ===
In September 2024, it was announced that shooting for the film, renamed The Cry of the Guards (Le Cri des gardes), would take place between January and February 2025 in Senegal. In January 2025, Variety reported that Blyth was in Senegal for filming on the project. In February 2025, Deadline Hollywood reported that filming was underway, with the film reverting back to the title The Fence.

== Release ==
The Fence had its world premiere in the Special Presentations section of the 2025 Toronto International Film Festival on 10 September 2025. It also screened at the Main Slate of the 2025 New York Film Festival.

International sales are handled by Goodfellas. Les Films du Losange distributed the film in France on 8 April 2026.

== Reception ==
=== Critical response ===
On the review aggregator website Rotten Tomatoes, 69% of 26 critics' reviews are positive, with an average rating of 5.6/10. Metacritic, which uses a weighted average, assigned the film a score of 57 out of 100, based on 12 critics, indicating "mixed or average" reviews. On AlloCiné, the film received an average rating of 3.3 out of 5 stars, based on 29 reviews from French critics.
