= Tom Blyth =

English actor (born 1995)

- Blyth in 2026
- Born: Tom Keir Blyth; 2 February 1995 (age 31); Birmingham, England
- Education: Juilliard School (BFA)
- Occupation: Actor
- Years active: 2010–present
- Father: Gavin Blyth

Tom Keir Blyth (born 2 February 1995) is an English actor. He trained at the Juilliard School.

After his first lead role in the film Scott and Sid (2018), he portrayed Glen Byam Shaw in Benediction (2021) before starring as Coriolanus Snow in The Hunger Games: The Ballad of Songbirds & Snakes (2023). For his performance in the prison film Wasteman (2025), he was nominated for a British Independent Film Award. His other films include Bull Run (2024), Plainclothes, The Fence (both 2025) and People We Meet on Vacation (2026). On television, he played the title role in the MGM+ series Billy the Kid (2022–2025).

In 2026, Blyth made his Broadway debut in a revival of A Few Good Men.

== Early life and education ==
Tom Keir Blyth was born in Birmingham on 2 February 1995 to Charlotte and Gavin Blyth. His father and paternal grandfather both worked in the media industry. Blyth has two younger siblings, a sister and a half-brother from his father's second marriage. Blyth spent his early childhood in Derbyshire. When his father was hired as a writer for the soap opera Emmerdale, the family moved to Tockwith, North Yorkshire. After his parents divorced when he was 11, Blyth moved with his mother and sister to Woodthorpe, a suburb of Nottingham, to be closer to her parents. Blyth was upset by the move; his mother tried to enroll him in an acting class, though he was initially reluctant. When he was 12, he started work on a paper round as he wanted to provide for himself. He would visit his father's house and writing studio in Leeds, two hours away. It was there that Blyth began to take an interest in storytelling; his father made it clear that he detested nepotism and would not pull any strings on Blyth's behalf.

In Nottingham, Blyth attended Arnold Hill Academy and later Bilborough College. Blyth's mother and a family friend managed to get him an audition at Nottingham's Television Workshop. At age 15, Blyth was pulled out of school and told his father had been taken into the hospital. Blyth's father died of non-Hodgkin lymphoma. After the loss of his father, Blyth returned to the Television Workshop and joined the National Youth Theatre, appearing in the productions Twelfth Night, Hay Fever, and A Clockwork Orange. Although he applied and was accepted to several drama schools, he turned them down. In 2016, after spending a summer volunteering for an on-the-move charity fundraiser, Blyth decided to pursue acting as a career. At 21, he auditioned for the Juilliard School in New York City, where he studied on a scholarship. Whilst at Juilliard, Blyth appeared in productions such as Twelfth Night and Antony and Cleopatra.

== Career ==
In 2010 Blyth began his on-screen career with small supporting roles in the films Robin Hood and Pelican Blood. In the years after graduating from college, he appeared in the short films Fibs (2014), Fluffy (2015), and Wash Club (2016), all while working odd-jobs in Nottingham.

In 2018 Blyth had his first lead role as Sid Sadowskyj opposite Richard Mason in the autobiographical coming-of-age film Scott and Sid. That same year he appeared in Hazey Eyes' music video for "Scars" featuring Yoke Lore, as well as in the television short Rise.

Upon graduating from Juilliard in 2020, Blyth was cast as Glen Byam Shaw in Terence Davies' biographical drama film Benediction, which premiered the following year.

In 2022 Blyth began starring as the titular William Bonney in the MGM+ series Billy the Kid. For the role, Blyth learned how to ride, shoot, and talk like a "proper cowboy" with an Irish-American accent. That same year, Blyth made a guest appearance in an episode of the HBO series The Gilded Age. In 2023, Blyth portrayed young Coriolanus Snow opposite Rachel Zegler in The Hunger Games: The Ballad of Songbirds & Snakes, an adaptation of The Hunger Games prequel of the same name.

Blyth starred in the 2024 film Bull Run based on Bill Keenan's bestselling memoir Discussion Materials. In 2025, Blyth starred in the drama film Plainclothes opposite Russell Tovey, the prison film Wasteman opposite David Jonsson, and Claire Denis' The Fence, based on Bernard-Marie Koltes' play Black Battles With Dogs. For his performance in Wasteman, Blyth was nominated for the British Independent Film Award for Best Supporting Performance. Also in 2025, he appeared in Paris Paloma's music video for "Good Boy".

Blyth starred opposite Emily Bader in the 2026 Netflix romance film People We Meet on Vacation, based on the novel of the same name by Emily Henry. Blyth has an upcoming role in the adaptation of Ernest Hemingway's novel A Farewell to Arms, set to film in January 2027.He made his Broadway debut as Daniel Kaffee in A Few Good Men at the Vivian Beaumont Theater.

== Personal life ==
As of 2025, Blyth is in a relationship with actress Daniela Norman. He was previously in a relationship with director Britt Berke.

== Credits ==
Key
†	Denotes films that have not yet been released

=== Film ===
Year	Title	Role	Notes
2010	Robin Hood	Feral Child	
2010	Pelican Blood	Young Nikko	
2014	Fibs	Will	Short film
2015	Fluffy	Party Clown	Short film
2016	Wash Club	Doug	Short film
2018	Scott and Sid	Sid	
2021	Benediction	Glen Byam Shaw	
2023	The Hunger Games: The Ballad of Songbirds & Snakes	Coriolanus Snow	
2024	Bull Run	Bobby Sanders	
2025	Plainclothes	Lucas Brennan	
2025	Wasteman	Dee	
2025	The Fence	Cal	
2026	People We Meet on Vacation	Alex Nilsen	
TBA	Watch Dogs †	TBA	Completed
TBA	A Farewell To Arms	Frederic Henry	Pre-Production

=== Television ===
Year	Title	Role	Notes
2018	Rise	Fred Perry	TV short
2022	The Gilded Age	Archie Baldwin	Episode: "Charity Has Two Functions"
2022–2025	Billy the Kid	Henry McCarty / William H. Bonney	24 episodes; also producer (season 3)

=== Theatre ===
Year	Title	Role	Venue	Notes
2026-2027	A Few Good Men	Daniel Kaffee	Vivian Beaumont Theater	Broadway debut

=== Audio ===
Year	Title	Role	Notes
2025	The Muse	William	Main role

=== Music Videos ===
Year	Title	Role
2018	Scars	Himself
2025	Paris Paloma: Good Boy	Good Boy

== Awards and nominations ==
Year	Association	Category	Work	Result	Ref.
2025	Saturn Awards	Best Actor in a Film	The Hunger Games: The Ballad of Songbirds and Snakes	Nominated	
2025	British Independent Film Awards	Best Supporting Performance	Wasteman	Nominated	
