= Scott and Sid =

2021 film

- British poster
- Directed by: Scott Elliott; Sid Sadowskyj
- Written by: Scott Elliott; Sid Sadowskyj
- Produced by: Scott Elliott; Sid Sadowskyj
- Starring: Tom Blyth; Richard Mason; Charlotte Milchard
- Cinematography: Will Humphris
- Edited by: Andy Morrison; Chris Gill, ACE
- Music by: Ian Arber
- Distributed by: Dreamchasers Film Ltd
- Release date: 1 March 2021
- Running time: 96 minutes
- Country: United Kingdom
- Language: English
- Budget: $2,000,000

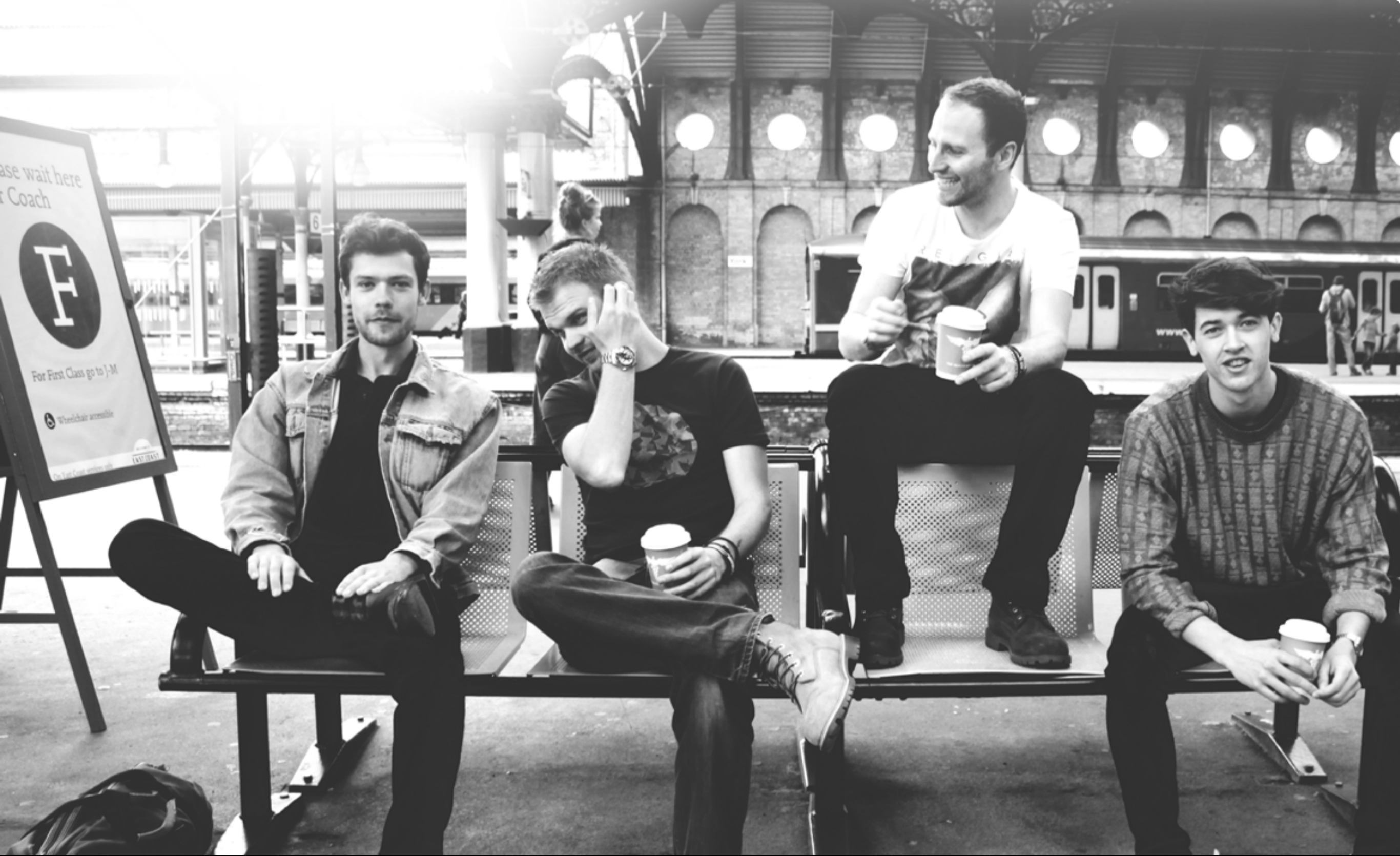

Scott and Sid is a British coming-of-age feature film directed, written and produced by Scott Elliott and Sid Sadowskyj. Based on the filmmakers’ real lives, this tale evolves around the lives of the two male protagonists as they strive to fulfill a list of ambitions made when they were 15, with the ultimate goal to make a film before they reach the age of thirty. The film stars Richard Mason and Tom Blyth, both making their debuts as the lead characters in the film, whilst Charlotte Milchard takes on the supporting role as Sid's mum. The film was made available to buy and rent in the UK on 1 March 2021, on Amazon and iTunes.

== Plot ==
Scott and Sid recount their story to a taxi driver, unfolding in flashbacks.

As schoolboys growing up in York, the pair were isolated, underachieving and a little lost. While Scott was an uncontainable and frantic youth, Sid was a more reserved and awkward teen. Both were weighed down by their chaotic lives; Scott, an unloved foster child, was expelled from multiple schools for his unruly behaviour and Sid, the son of an alcoholic Karen and an absent father, was caught buying alcohol underage and swept up in a dodgy scheme selling alcohol for gangsters. Both are ridiculed by their teacher when they contemplate what the future holds for them and despairing of the compromise and limited ambitions around them, they are united by friendship.

In defiance of the low expectations that everyone had for them, Scott and Sid wrote a list of goals and began pursuing each one in turn to create a better life. The overly serious Sid is inspired by Scott's wild and untamed spirit, while Scott draws strength from Sid's boundless work ethic and determination to get ahead. They call themselves "Dreamchasers", building their whole lifestyle and ideology around pushing themselves farther and faster than anyone expects. Fuelled by ambition and entrepreneurial spirit they launch two successful businesses while still at school. However, lies and deceit soon tarnish the friendship.

Overcoming their troubles, they continue to strive to be better. Even at the age of 24, it is not enough for them to have a successful media business--they want more. Item number one on their list of dreams remains: to make a film. Chasing their biggest dream yet, they embark on their journey.

== Cast ==
- Richard Mason as Scott
- Tom Blyth as Sid
- Charlotte Milchard as Karen
- David Summer as Mr. Olsen
- Maggie Daniels as Mrs. Finn
- Andrew Porter as Nicky Watson
- Colin Fox as Gavin Watson
- Ranj Nagra as Mr. Nanda
- Jerry Anderson as cabbie/Mike
- Laura Jean Marsh as Jade
- Danielle Brown as Tara
- Robin Colvill as Detective Russell
- Naj Modak as Omar
- Juliet Howland as Elaine

== Production ==
The film was developed and produced by Elsa Media.

=== Development ===
From an early age, both Elliott and Sadowskyj knew they wanted to make a film. At the age of 15, they wrote down a list of everything they wanted to achieve in their lives and set about accomplishing them. Fuelled by an entrepreneurial drive, they launched two successful businesses while still at school, beginning with door-to-door oven cleaning. This semi-autobiographical story began with Elliott and Sadowskyj writing down significant moments from their lives, "culled directly from their shared experiences in publishing and event management and includes the moment when Scott met with loan sharks." Sadowskyj said that the light bulb moment that changed things for [them] was at 24, when Scott came into the office, said he wanted out of the business and, after an "awkward discussion", the pair got out a marker and circled "Make a Movie" and said "What's next?". From that moment [they] sold up and started to put 100% of [their] efforts into filmmaking.

Using elements of fiction to streamline the story or emphasis certain aspects of the characters, they wanted to be honest about the lows as well as the highs of their story together. Elliott's dyslexia meant that he did not learn how to write a professional script from reading books but by watching films, focusing on the structure, character, emotional beats and filmmaking techniques used in the films.

=== Pre-production ===
Having never made a film before, Elliott and Sadowskyj began months of preparation after the script was formed. Taking advice from people in the industry, they set about finding investors for the film and after a year-long campaign, they were successful. The "gruelling" process also gave them a key piece of inspiration for the film's structure as the story unfolds in flashbacks as the pair travel in a taxi to an important meeting. Elliott and Sadowskyj always planned on making the film in the North of England. Wanting to "tell a positive story about an area too often dismissed as grim or depressing", the pair made use of many locations in Yorkshire. Making "the most of Yorkshire's spectacular natural beauty and the Northern English character", the duo used their close ties to the community to find buildings to use around York, Leeds, Bradford, and the surrounding areas.

=== Production ===
Principal photography on the film began in May 2018. Filmed on location in-and-around York, Leeds, and Bradford, Scott and Sid took over seven weeks to shoot. Sadowskyj took on the role of unit manager and location manager while on set, before settling into a more traditional role of producer. Elliott, a very actor-orientated director, worked closely with Blyth and Mason, pushing them into their characters more.

=== Post-production ===
Working with editor Andy Morrison to bring the film together and create the director's cut, Elliott and Sadowskyj focused on creating the finished film. With the use of focus groups and test audiences, they refined and re-cut the film, and when Morrison had to move on to another job, Chris Gill ACE, who previously worked on The Best Exotic Marigold Hotel and 28 Days Later, joined the crew.

== Music ==
The musical score for Scott and Sid was composed by film and television composer Ian Arber. Arber's compositional approach makes use of minimal orchestral instruments with cello-lead melodic phrases and intricate percussive and atmospheric elements throughout his scores.

== Themes ==
The film explores the theme of dreamchasing; having the ambition to chase your dreams, Scott and Sid aims to encourage people to get moving and chase their dreams, with a strong moral to the story that if you believe in yourself, you can do anything. The film, which at one point was going to be called Dreamchaser is a testament to dreaming big but living in the real world when it comes to filmmaking. Based on a true story drawn from the lives of the writer-producer-director team, it is a film about the themes of hope, ambition, and success.

== Critical response ==
The film received a range of positive reviews from film critics. Alex Clement from HeyUGuys said "This film feels more like a sense of achievement rather than your typical blockbuster movie..it brings out the personalities of the real men behind this story and they finally get to tell it to the world. It’s a powerful statement to people watching, it says you can do whatever you want if you try hard enough. There is no dream too big and anything is possible if you believe in yourself." Ed Edwards of The Upcoming said "the drive to spread their wings and prove they are made of something special – even just to themselves – is conveyed wonderfully and is certainly sufficient on its own, making Scott and Sid a gripping success story that is well worth watching." Katherine Flint-Nicol of BritFlicks said: "What is refreshing about the film, also holds the film back. Its desire to be persistently feel-good steers it away from what could have been interesting avenues to go down. However, there is creativity here. The narrative structure is played with, reminiscent of Nick Hamms’, Martha meet Frank, Daniel and Laurence. The film could have benefitted from a summer release. This upbeat film is made for sunny days." Allan Hunter of the Daily Express rated the film 4 out of 5 stars.

== Prints ==
A limited-edition print collection focused on the film has also been created. Hoping to "recapture the wildness of youth," the collection is the "brainchild" of filmmakers Scott Elliott and Sid Sadowskyj and is inspired by the "thoughts, memories and adventures of their own childhood." The images help "capture the purity of friendship between the two protagonists and reflect their shared spirit of adventure".

== Novelization ==
Based on the screenplay of Scott and Sid, and written by Ali Wright, this story of friendship and coming-of-age details how the duo broke free from their dysfunctional lives as they strived to be more than normal. The book details the highs and lows of the pair's true story and allows for readers to learn more about how Elliott and Sadowskyj progressed from their dream to raising the funds to make their first feature film. Scott and Sid: The Novel is available on iBooks and Kindle and available to buy as paperback/hardcover.

== Awards and nominations ==
Scott and Sid won two awards: Best British Film and Best Supporting Actress (for Charlotte Milchard) at the National Film Awards UK 2019 and was nominated for Best Drama but lost to Yardie.

== Trailer ==
- Scott and Sid film trailer
