= Unconformity (film) =

2022 film directed by Jonathan DiMaio

- Release poster
- Directed by: Jonathan DiMaio
- Written by: Jonathan DiMaio
- Production company: Topiary Productions
- Distributed by: Indie Rights
- Release date: June 30, 2022
- Running time: 85 minutes
- Country: United States
- Language: English

Unconformity is a 2022 drama film directed by Jonathan DiMaio starring Jack Mulhern, and Alex Oliver.

== Premise ==
A geology graduate student (Alex) misses a unique geological research opportunity, and after being challenged by her advisor, she decides to head alone towards the Nevada desert.

== Cast ==
- Alex Oliver - Alex
- Jeremy Holm - Everett
- Eddie Martinez - Jason Lowrie
- Rachel Pate - Dr. Edwina Beatty
- Jack Mulhern - Nick
- Drew Gehling - Dr. Petro Stein
- Ben Baur - Gary

== Release ==
It had a digital release by Indie Rights on June 30, 2022.

== Reception ==
On the review aggregator website Rotten Tomatoes, 100% of 7 critics' reviews are positive.

On New York Amsterdam News, Lapacazo Magrira Sandoval wrote that the film "is a character-driven drama about the uncertainty of finding what makes your life worth living." On Film Threat, Alan Ng rated the film 8 out 10, writing in his review consensus section, "i admire filmmaker DiMaio's story and his introspective feelings about the art of living."

== See also ==
- Unconformity
- List of drama films of the 2020s
