= Odd Man Out: A Year on the Mound with a Minor League Misfit =

2009 memoir by Matt McCarthy

- Author: Matt McCarthy
- Language: English
- Subject: Baseball
- Genre: Memoir
- Publisher: Viking Press
- Publication date: February 2009
- Publication place: United States
- Media type: Print (Hardcover)
- Pages: 294
- ISBN: 978-0-670-02070-6

Odd Man Out: A Year on the Mound with a Minor League Misfit (ISBN 978-0-670-02070-6) is a 2009 memoir by Matt McCarthy in which McCarthy recounts his experiences as a professional baseball player in the Anaheim Angels minor-league system during the 2002 season. Major themes include steroids, minor league living conditions, players' sexual hijinks, the crass attitudes held by players and coaches, and the clubhouse segregation between white players and "Dominicans" (a catch-all term for Latino players).

An excerpt from the book was published in the February 16, 2009 issue of Sports Illustrated; the book, published by Viking Press, was released on February 19, 2009, and at one time was ranked at #29 on the New York Times non-fiction bestseller list.

Although initially critically well-received, several people mentioned in the book have disputed its accuracy, and after extensive research, two reporters from The New York Times concluded that "many portions of the book are incorrect, embellished, or impossible."

== Synopsis ==
McCarthy, the son of two college professors, was born in North Carolina but moved to Orlando, Florida at a young age when his parents took jobs at the University of Central Florida. A left-handed pitcher, McCarthy played for Bishop Moore High School in Orlando, and subsequently played for Yale University.

McCarthy was drafted by the Anaheim Angels in the 21st round of the 2002 Major League Baseball draft. He participated in the Angels' minor league Spring Training and was assigned to the rookie-level Provo Angels of the Pioneer League.

McCarthy spent the 2002 season going back and forth between the starting rotation and the bullpen. Much of the book describes his life off the field during that season, such as long bus rides to away games, living in a hotel and subsequently with a Mormon family, altercations with teammates, and acclimating to life in predominantly Mormon Provo. He also describes several games from his own perspective on the mound or in the dugout, as well as a different perspective on games such as Joe Saunders' first start for Provo, as well as a game where Larry King was the guest of honor.

The next spring, McCarthy returned to Spring Training. He was placed on three different minor league squads, including the Triple-A squad, but was released before Spring Training ended. After his release, he enrolled in Harvard Medical School, and did work in Cameroon and Malaysia. McCarthy was a medical intern at Columbia-Presbyterian Medical Center at the time Odd Man Out was published; in April 2016, he published a new book, The Real Doctor Will See You Shortly: A Physician's First Year (ISBN 978-0804138673), about his year as an intern.

== Notable people mentioned ==
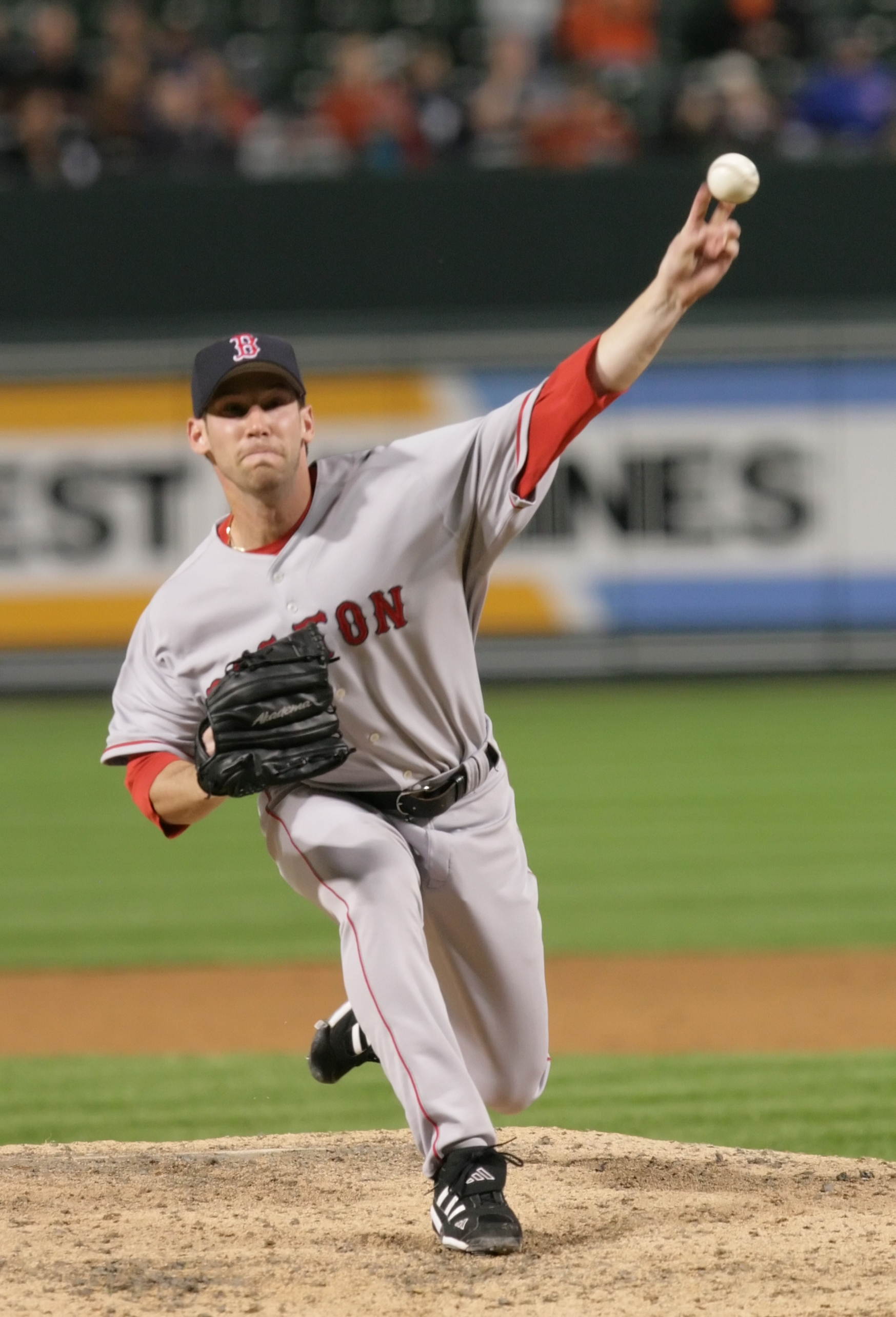
Craig Breslow

Several notable players and other personnel are prominently mentioned in Odd Man Out. The most prominent mentions include:

- Craig Breslow – McCarthy's teammate at Yale and his best friend, drafted by the Milwaukee Brewers and assigned to the Ogden Raptors, Provo's rival
- John Stuper – McCarthy's head coach at Yale
- Joe Saunders – McCarthy's teammate in Provo
- Erick Aybar – McCarthy's teammate in Provo
- Quan Cosby – McCarthy's teammate in Provo
- Alberto Callaspo – McCarthy's teammate in Provo
- Tony Reagins – the Angels' director of player development
- Tom Kotchman – McCarthy's manager in Provo
- Bill Stoneman – the Angels' general manager

Other notable personnel McCarthy mentions meeting and/or playing against include Bobby Jenks, Chris Young, Derrick Turnbow, Prince Fielder, Manny Parra, Jonathan Broxton, Brian Harper, Casey Kotchman, Howie Kendrick, Ervin Santana, Mike Napoli, Jarrod Washburn, Bengie Molina.

== Controversy ==
McCarthy has stated that much of the book's content was taken from detailed journals he kept while he was playing. However, several people mentioned in the book have criticized its factual accuracy. Two reporters from The New York Times pored over box scores and transaction listings, as well as interviews with people named in the book, and concluded that "many portions of the book are incorrect, embellished, or impossible." Examples include:

- Matt Brown denies he was involved in an incident described in the book that involved the son of CNN talk show host Larry King punching him in the groin, as he was not on the Provo roster at the time.
- Tony Reagins, the Angels' director of player development at the time the book's events took place and the team's general manager when it was published, denies two specific incidents McCarthy describes, one involving a meeting between McCarthy and Reagins where Reagins allegedly restructures McCarthy's contract, the other involving "tears streaming down [Reagins'] face" when releasing McCarthy.

== See also ==
- Moneyball: The Art of Winning an Unfair Game
- Odd Man Rush: A Harvard Kid's Hockey Odyssey from Central Park to Somewhere in Sweden—with Stops along the Way
- Ball Four
- Bull Durham
