= Jack Mulhern (actor) =

American actor

Jack Mulhern is an American actor. He is known for his role as Grizz Visser in the Netflix drama series The Society (2019), his supporting role as Dylan Hinchey in the HBO miniseries Mare of Easttown (2021), and his role as Don Hume in George Clooney's biographical sports drama The Boys in the Boat (2023).

== Personal life and education ==
Mulhern graduated from Skidmore College in 2017 with a Bachelor of Arts in Theatre. He is the son of actor Matt Mulhern.

== Career ==
His breakthrough came with his first major series role in the Netflix mystery drama The Society as Gareth "Grizz" Visser, created by Chris Keyser and produced by Marc Webb, which premiered on 10 May 2019. He played a closeted gay introverted athlete whose relationship with deaf character Sam Elliot, played by Sean Berdy, becomes one of the series' central storylines. To prepare for the role, Mulhern learned American Sign Language, something that became central to one of the series' most talked-about scenes, in which Grizz secretly teaches himself ASL before asking Sam how to sign "kiss me.". The relationship between Grizz and Sam received particular attention from LGBTQ+ press. PinkNews covered the storyline as a notable example of a gay and deaf character receiving a meaningful love story on a major streaming platform, while Out later named Sam and Grizz among the most memorable queer couples in cancelled television. Refinery29 called Mulhern "the breakout boy of Netflix's The Society," while TV Guide's review of the first season singled out Grizz, noting his "hidden vulnerabilities provide some of the most touching scenes of the season." The series also starred Kathryn Newton, Gideon Adlon, and Alex Fitzalan. Netflix renewed the series for a second season in July 2019, before cancelling it in August 2020 due to COVID-19.

In 2021, Mulhern appeared in the HBO crime drama miniseries Mare of Easttown, written by Brad Ingelsby and directed by Craig Zobel. Starring Kate Winslet as a small-town Pennsylvania detective investigating a murder. He plays Dylan Hinchey, Erin McMenamin's troubled ex-boyfriend and a prime suspect in her murder investigation. His interrogation scene opposite Winslet was highlighted by NPR's Fresh Air as an early example of the show's tense character dynamics. GQ also cited the character as central to the show's mystery, describing Dylan as one of several suspects whose motives and perspectives drive the narrative. The series received critical acclaim, winning four Primetime Emmy Awards including Outstanding Lead Actress for Winslet, and holds a 95% approval rating on Rotten Tomatoes.

He was cast in 2022 as Don Hume in George Clooney's biographical sports drama The Boys in the Boat, based on Daniel James Brown's 2013 New York Times bestselling book about the University of Washington rowing team's journey to the 1936 Summer Olympics in Berlin. The film, produced by MGM and Spyglass Entertainment, stars Joel Edgerton as coach Al Ulbrickson and Callum Turner as Joe Rantz. The Hollywood Reporter reviewed the film, noting the ensemble's work in depicting the crew's unlikely rise from working-class backgrounds to Olympic gold. The film was released on 25 December 2023.

=== Film ===
Year	Title	Role	Notes
2020	Odd Man Rush	Bobby Sanders	
2022	Unconformity	Nick	
2023	Pet Sematary: Bloodlines	Timmy Baterman	Paramount+
2023	The Boys in the Boat	Don Hume	MGM/Spyglass Entertainment
2023	I'll Be Right There	Eugene	
2026	The Only Living Pickpocket in New York	Bryce	

=== Television ===
Year	Title	Role	Notes
2017	Locke & Key	Tyler Locke	Unaired Hulu pilot
2019	The Society	Grizz Visser	Main role; 10 episodes; Netflix
2019	Wu-Tang: An American Saga	Teddy	Episodic role
2021	Mare of Easttown	Dylan Hinchey	Recurring role; 7 episodes; HBO
2023	Painkiller	Tyler Kryger	Recurring role; 6 episodes; Netflix
