= In the Crease =

- Directed by: Matthew Gannon; Michael Sarner
- Starring: Scott Niedermayer; Joe Thornton; Scott Gomez; Brendan Shanahan; Jeremy Roenick; Martin Havlát; Brian Rolston; Mike Knuble; R. J. Umberger; Derian Hatcher; Craig Conroy; Al MacInnis; Mathieu Schneider; Mike Comrie; Glen Murray; Erik Johnson
- Theme music composer: We 3 Kings
- Country of origin: United States
- Original language: English

Production
- Producers: Matthew Gannon; Michael Sarner
- Cinematography: Irving Ong; George Dougherty; Jesse Phinney
- Editors: Matthew Gannon; Michael Sarner; Marshall Lee
- Running time: 90 minutes

Original release
- Network: Versus
- Release: October 26, 2006

In the Crease (the youth hockey experience) is a feature-length documentary film that follows the real-life story of a teenage hockey team's quest to win a national championship and also stars over a dozen National Hockey League (NHL) players sharing their own hockey triumphs. The film was produced and directed by Matthew Gannon and Michael Sarner, distributed by Stickmen Pictures LLC, aired on Versus on January 20, 2008, and was released on DVD on October 26, 2006.

== Plot ==
Coach Mike Lewis assembles the California Wave Bantam AAA travel hockey team with one goal in mind: getting to the national championship. The team includes young stars like Mitchell Wahl, the team's co-captain and leading scorer, Troy Power, Steven Hoshaw, Greg Hirshland, Wayne Ravdjee, and Erick Anderson. In their final season playing together, and with only one month to prepare to face off against the best teams in the nation, each of these players is profiled as they battle against injuries and personal challenges and come together as a team for one last shot at a national title.

When the Wave reach the USA Hockey national championship in Bensenville, Illinois, they play the Dallas Alliance, TPH Thunder and Nashua Panthers. They win each of these qualifying round games, and then come up against the formidable Honeybaked team from Michigan in the playoffs. In an action packed game that goes scoreless for two periods, the Wave are denied a goal when one of their players is called in the crease. Honeybaked then take a 1–0 lead with just minutes left in the game. The Wave get a power play opportunity but fail to score, and then Honeybaked seals the victory with an empty netter when the Wave pull their goaltender. The loss is devastating for the Wave, but some of the players vow to return to nationals the next year.

Sure enough, twelve months later, Coach Lewis and the Wave do make it back to nationals in Rochester, New York. They go on to defeat the New Jersey Jr. Devils in overtime in the championship game.

Throughout the film, NHL stars such as Scott Niedermayer, Joe Thornton, Scott Gomez, Jeremy Roenick, Brendan Shanahan, Martin Havlát and Brian Rolston share their own personal stories about what it takes to be the best and what it means to win a national championship. The Wave's story also shows the passion and dedication to hockey shared by young players and hockey families around the world.

== Cast ==
- Scott Niedermayer...Himself
- Joe Thornton...Himself
- Scott Gomez...Himself
- Brendan Shanahan...Himself
- Jeremy Roenick...Himself
- Martin Havlát...Himself
- Brian Rolston...Himself
- Derian Hatcher...Himself
- R. J. Umberger...Himself
- Mike Knuble...Himself
- Mathieu Schneider...Himself
- Craig Conroy...Himself
- Mike Comrie...Himself
- Al MacInnis...Himself
- Glen Murray...Himself
- Erik Johnson...Himself

== Reception ==
In the Crease was viewed by over 200,000 households during its airings on Versus in 2008 and was the #1 bestselling sports DVD on Amazon in both the U.S. and Canada upon its release. Variety called In the Crease "the new model" for how to sell a movie without a theatrical release.

== See also ==
- List of films about ice hockey
