= Discussion Materials =

2020 memoir by Bill Keenan

Discussion Materials: Tales of a Rookie Wall Street Investment Banker
- Author: Bill Keenan
- Language: English
- Subject: Finance
- Genre: Memoir
- Publisher: Simon & Schuster
- Publication date: March 2020
- Publication place: United States
- Media type: Print (Hardcover)
- Pages: 320
- ISBN: 978-1642934083

Discussion Materials: Tales of a Rookie Wall Street Investment Banker (ISBN 978-1642934083) is a 2020 memoir by Bill Keenan in which Keenan recounts his tenure as an investment banking associate at Deutsche Bank. First published in 2020, it is considered one of the books that defined Wall Street during the post-2008 financial crisis era.

CNBC journalist Jane Wells called it an "updated Liar's Poker," and Vanity Fair journalist William D. Cohan said it was "an investment banking tragicomedy...Somewhere between Michael Lewis’ Liar's Poker and Kevin Roose's Young Money."

Air Mail published an excerpt from the book on February 29, 2020.

The book's name is taken from the title investment bankers give to the decks they prepare for clients.

== Background ==
After graduating from Columbia Business School in 2016, Keenan joined the investment banking division of Deutsche Bank. In his memoir, he recounts working in three industry groups: Financial Institutions Group, Industrials, and Natural Resources. In 2018, he quit and his resignation email quickly circulated amongst banking circles eventually getting published by Dealbreaker.

== Reception ==
Kirkus Reviews wrote,

Although Keenan’s memoir is every bit as informative as business classics like Den of Thieves, Liar’s Poker, and Barbarians at the Gate, it’s also game and accessible, coming across at all points as the most readable kind of The Firm–style fiction, complete with sharp personalities and lively dialogue. His own experiences in the trenches are far less the shark-tank glamour of Wall Street and far more the squalid desperation of Boiler Room.

== Movie adaptation ==
In March 2020, Deadline Hollywood reported a film adaptation was underway starring Tom Blyth and produced by Doug Ellin (the creator of Entourage) and Howard Baldwin.

The film was renamed Bull Run and premiered at the Newport Beach Film Festival on October 19, 2024. The film was released by Vertical in theaters and VOD on November 14, 2025.

== Notable people mentioned ==
- John Cryan – CEO of Deutsche Bank
- Donald Trump – Deutsche Bank client and President

== See also ==
- Den of Thieves by James B. Stewart
- Liar's Poker by Michael Lewis
- When Genius Failed by Roger Lowenstein
- Too Big to Fail by Andrew Ross Sorkin
- The Big Short by Michael Lewis
