= Jeff Jimerson =

American singer (born 1955)

Jeff Jimerson (born May 15, 1955 in Pittsburgh) is a Pittsburgh-based singer, best known as the national anthem singer for the Pittsburgh Penguins for over two decades. He also performs with Airborne, a Pittsburgh-based band.

In 2011, Bleacher Report named Jimerson one of the eight best national anthem singers in hockey.

Jimerson, credited as "Anthem Singer," sang the national anthem in the 1995 Jean-Claude Van Damme film, Sudden Death.

He performed on the 2004 B. E. Taylor album One Nation Under God.

As the Penguins anthem singer, he has sung the national anthem during the Stanley Cup Finals in 2008, 2009, 2016, and 2017.

He is known as "The Penguins' Own".
