= Odd Man Rush (film) =

2020 American film

- Film poster
- Directed by: Doug Dearth
- Written by: Bill Keenan
- Based on: Odd Man Rush by Bill Keenan
- Produced by: Howard Baldwin; Karen E. Baldwin; Todd Slater; Jonathan M Black; Bill Keenan
- Starring: Jack Mulhern; Elektra Kilbey; Dylan Playfair; Trevor Gretzky; Bjørn Alexander; Caspar Phillipson; Gjermund Gjesme; Sissy Sheridan
- Cinematography: Zoran Popovic
- Edited by: Thomas E. Vogt
- Music by: Josh Edmondson
- Distributed by: Hulu; Gravitas Ventures; Pacific Northwest Pictures; Myriad Pictures
- Release date: September 1, 2020 (United States)
- Countries: United States; Canada
- Language: English

Odd Man Rush is a 2020 film directed by Doug Dearth and produced by Todd Slater, Jonathan M. Black Grant Slater, Karen Baldwin, and Howard Baldwin. The film is based on Bill Keenan's 2016 memoir, Odd Man Rush, about growing up in the 1990s as a New York Rangers fan, playing college hockey for Harvard and ending up in minor pro leagues in Sweden and Germany when injuries disrupted his dreams of an NHL career. It was released on September 1, 2020.

The film's sequel, Bull Run, stars Tom Blyth and Jay Mohr and was released by Vertical in theaters and VOD on November 14, 2025.

== Plot ==
When Harvard hockey's Bobby Sanders lands in Sweden's minor leagues, his relationship with the girl at the local market forces him to confront the reality of his childhood NHL dreams.

== Critical reception ==
Odd Man Rush received generally favorable reviews. Critics noted the film "is surprisingly sweet and thoughtful for a film that revolves around hockey. It certainly deserves recognition for its nuanced portrait of a side of the hockey world that is rarely shown on screen."

The film was praised for its authenticity with Andrew Parker of TheGATE.ca declaring it "a low-key and charming blend of sports, comedy, drama, and a dash of romance, Odd Man Rush is a pleasant indie movie surprise that feels more like a character driven slice of life story instead of an endless parade of genre cliches...Odd Man Rush is the best in the genre this year." Another critic noted, "The cast provides authenticity that, when combined with the comedic and emotional aspects, creates a film that hits on all the correct notes and successfully translates Keenan’s life story from memoir to on-screen product." Barry Hertz of The Globe and Mail praised the film for "its heart...and engaging sense of irony." Sports Illustrated called it a "comical coming-of-age story."

The film was also lauded for its quirkiness as one critic wrote, "In the end it was a film which surprised me...its heart and humor won me over. That plus the fact that it does not take itself too seriously. I ended up liking the retro feel and looking forward to the times the lead character broke the 4th wall."

== See also ==
- List of films about ice hockey
