= Ahockalypse =

- Directed by: Wayne Harry Johnson Jr.
- Written by: Wayne Harry Johnson Jr.
- Produced by: Craig Patrick
- Starring: Jesse Rennicke; Squall Charlson; Alex Galick; Gabrielle Arrowsmith; Kaylee Williams
- Cinematography: Mark Kasper; Adam Natrop
- Edited by: Jeremy Wanek
- Music by: Pete Coleman
- Production company: Sparrowhawk Pictures
- Release date: 9 April 2018
- Running time: 79 minutes
- Country: United States
- Language: English

Ahockalypse is a 2018 American zombie comedy film written and directed by Wayne Harry Johnson Jr., starring Jesse Rennicke, Squall Charlson, Alex Galick, Gabrielle Arrowsmith and Kaylee Williams.

== Cast ==
- Jesse Rennicke as Jonsey
- Squall Charlson as B.J.
- Alex Galick as Wave
- Gabrielle Arrowsmith as Mrs. Johnson
- Kaylee Williams as Jenny
- Mason Hendricks as Swede
- Jonathan Goodman as Vlad Putin
- Kelly Chase as himself
- Barry Melrose as himself

== Release ==
The film was released to VOD on 17 August 2018.

== Reception ==
Matthew Solomon of PopHorror praised the performances and wrote that while the film "might not have the polish of a big-budget blockbuster" and "makes up for it with pure puck chuckles and mayhem." Daniel Wilder of HorrorFuel wrote: "The final verdict on Ahockalypse is that while there is a deficit of decent laughs and craziness in the film, it does possess plenty of zombie battlin’ action, some engaging performances, and it’s never boring so there’s that for ya."

J. Hurtado of ScreenAnarchy opined that it is "as if they couldn't decide if they wanted to make the film a series of loosely connected gags or an actual film in which the characters are meant to draw our empathy" and that it "ails on both counts, not delivering memorable enough gags, nor characters with whom we are interested in spending eighty minutes." Laura D. Girolamo of Exclaim! gave the film a score of 2/10 and wrote: "Playing off shoddy work and a lack of attention to detail with regards to not only the effects, but writing and directing, as just something genre audiences should come to expect from pulpy B-movies is downright offensive." Michael Gingold of Rue Morgue called it a "staggeringly unfunny mix of sports and zombies that qualifies only as an 80-minute foul."
