= Odd Man Rush =

2016 memoir by Bill Keenan

Odd Man Rush: A Harvard Kid's Hockey Odyssey from Central Park to Somewhere in Sweden—with Stops along the Way
- Author: Bill Keenan
- Language: English
- Subject: Ice hockey
- Genre: Memoir
- Publisher: Skyhorse Publishing
- Publication date: February 2016
- Publication place: United States
- Media type: Print (Hardcover)
- Pages: 278
- ISBN: 978-1-61321-817-4

Odd Man Rush: A Harvard Kid's Hockey Odyssey from Central Park to Somewhere in Sweden—with Stops along the Way (ISBN 978-1613218174) is a 2016 memoir by Bill Keenan in which Keenan recounts his experiences playing junior hockey, college hockey at Harvard, and professional hockey in minor leagues in Europe after injuries disrupted his dreams of an NHL career. At its publication, the book debuted as the #1 sports book on Amazon.com at which time it also broke into the top 100 books overall on the site.

Vanity Fair published an excerpt from the book on December 22, 2015.

In June 2019, Variety reported a film adaptation was underway with Howard Baldwin, once an NHL owner producing. The movie was released on September 1, 2020.

== Notable people mentioned ==
Several notable players and other personnel are prominently mentioned in the book. The most prominent mentions include:

- Jeremy Lin – Keenan's classmate at Harvard
- Sidney Crosby – Keenan's youth hockey opponent
- Ted Donato – Keenan's coach at Harvard
- Paul Stewart – assistant coach at Harvard
- Dylan Reese – Keenan's teammate at Harvard
- Alex Killorn – Keenan's teammate at Harvard
- Rob Schremp – Keenan's youth hockey teammate
- Jonathan Quick – Keenan's youth hockey teammate
- Mike Danton – Keenan's pro hockey opponent
- Sean Backman – Keenan's youth hockey teammate
- Mathias Lange – Keenan's junior hockey teammate
- Matt Gilroy – Keenan's junior hockey teammate

Other notable individuals Keenan mentions meeting and/or playing against include Wayne Gretzky, Adam Graves, Sean Avery, Evgeni Malkin, Chris Drury, Rick DiPietro and George Plimpton.

== See also ==
- Ball Four
- Odd Man Out: A Year on the Mound with a Minor League Misfit
