= Alaska Press Club =

U.S. nonprofit organization

The Alaska Press Club is a network of journalists and media in Alaska. The club holds an annual journalism conference and awards banquet in Anchorage, Alaska, known as J-Week. The organization also awards scholarships to individuals.

The club was incorporated in 1951. The club consists of several hundred members and is open to students and professional journalists in Alaska.
