= Howard Baldwin =

American entrepreneur and film producer

- Born: May 14, 1942 (age 84); New York City, New York, U.S.
- Occupations: American entrepreneur and film producer
- Known for: CEO, Baldwin Entertainment; Co-founder of New England Whalers; Former owner of the Hartford Whalers; Former co-owner of Minnesota North Stars and Pittsburgh Penguins
- Spouse: Karen Mulvihill Baldwin
- Awards: 2010 inaugural inductee into the World Hockey Association Hall of Fame in the builders category

Howard Lapsley Baldwin (born May 14, 1942) is an American entrepreneur and film producer. Baldwin founded the New England Whalers ice hockey franchise in the World Hockey Association (WHA) and retained ownership when the team became the Hartford Whalers and joined the National Hockey League (NHL). He has also owned part of the Minnesota North Stars and Pittsburgh Penguins NHL franchises. He is the CEO of Baldwin Entertainment, which has produced films such as the Academy Award-nominated Ray.

== Professional ice hockey ==
=== New England/Hartford Whalers ===
Baldwin became one of the youngest executives in professional sports when he became a founder and partner of the WHA's Boston-based New England Whalers in 1971 at the age of 28. Five years later he was president of the league. The Whalers first season in the WHA was a success both on and off the ice with coach Jack Kelley's team winning the 1973 AVCO World Cup Championship. Kelley was also the very first recipient of a trophy named after Baldwin, the WHA's coach of the year award.

In 1974, Baldwin determined that the team needed its own building as the Whalers had been sharing the Boston Garden arena with the NHL's Boston Bruins. He moved the Whalers from Boston to Hartford's new Civic Center Coliseum, a vehicle for the revitalization of downtown Hartford, with the team playing their first game there in 1975. In 1979 Baldwin guided the WHA into a historic merger with the NHL with his New England Whalers making the transition to the more established league after their identity was changed to the Hartford Whalers. Baldwin served as the managing general partner of the Whalers until the team was sold to local ownership in 1988.

=== Pittsburgh and other ventures ===
Baldwin was a founding investor in the World Football League and was to own a franchise in Boston, Massachusetts, but pulled out of the league before its inaugural 1974 season began.

Baldwin created the San Jose Sharks as an expansion team, later taking a controlling interest in the Minnesota North Stars, and before later purchasing the Pittsburgh Penguins, all of which are NHL ice hockey teams. In 1993, Baldwin, alongside Tom Ruta and a variety of investors such as Mario Lemieux and Michael J. Fox, bought 50% of Moscow Red Army team in the belief that doing so would "give us an edge in knowledge on Russian players and give us a way to get sponsorships", with a joint statement being made on June 29, 1993 between Baldwin's Pittsburgh Hockey Associates, Red Army coach Viktor Tikhonov and GM Valerii Gushin.

Various promotional tactics were used during games to attract attention that ranged from a Free beer night to raffles for Jeeps and toilet paper to even having cheerleaders (which backfired after one game). In the second season, a litany of murders (star defenseman Alexander Osadchy, team photographer Felix Solovyov, and assistant coach Vladimir Bogach) troubled the team. In June 1995, the Baldwins were approached by Russian gangsters who were becoming involved in the partnership that led to the Baldwins leaving the team. Baldwin was interviewed for the 2019 documentary Red Penguins about his tenure as owner.

He became involved with the American Hockey League, a player development league affiliated with the NHL, forming the Wilkes-Barre/Scranton Penguins in Pennsylvania, and Manchester Monarchs in New Hampshire.

Owing to his business practices of being involved in sports management without investing too much of his own money (as done by involving partners and assuming debt), Baldwin became interested in being part of the Pittsburgh Penguins, particularly since Edward DeBartolo, Sr. looking to sell. Alongside Morris Belzberg, Thomas Ruta and Spectacor Management Group, Baldwin became a part owner of the Pittsburgh Penguins in 1992. One of Baldwin's first moves was to rid the team of their iconic penguin logo (which he labeled "pathetic") for a modernized new logo that would presumably make plenty of money in merchandise (the logo, once dubbed a "pigeon", was retained until 2002).

Baldwin and his partners created the American Hockey League expansion franchise in Wilkes-Barre, Pennsylvania in 1999 as the minor league affiliate of the NHL Penguins; the Wilkes-Barre/Scranton Penguins still play in their city.

Owing to problems with long, deferred contracts far above market value for players such as Tom Barrasso that could not hold up due to lower revenues, the team went into financial disarray to the point of bankruptcy in which the debt went to $124 million that exceeded their estimated value of $75 million to $95 million. Baldwin recruited Roger Marino, a Boston investor to join the ownership. Baldwin was no longer owner in February 1998.

In 1999, he formed Manchester Hockey Group LLC, while in the process of moving a dormant AHL franchise to New Hampshire to start play in 2001. On June 14, 2000, the Los Angeles Kings bought the team from Baldwin's group; the Manchester Monarchs played in the AHL from 2001 to 2015.

As early as 2003, Baldwin wanted to have financial control of the Hartford Wolf Pack of the AHL, but the New York Rangers rejected his overtures. In 2009, Baldwin founded Hartford Hockey LLC, better known as Whalers Sports & Entertainment, to promote ice hockey throughout Connecticut. In August 2010, Whalers Sports and Entertainment was hired by the NHL's New York Rangers to manage the day-to-day business and marketing affairs for their AHL affiliate the Hartford Wolf Pack. As part of the marketing agreement, the minor league team was renamed the Connecticut Whale, as a tribute to the former Hartford Whalers team. In June 2012, after less than two years, the Rangers ended their association with Baldwin and his company after they ran up a debt of almost $3 million and had about 15 court cases against them.

Baldwin licensed the name Connecticut Whale to a franchise of the Premier Hockey Federation, a founding member of the 2015 upstart league.

==== Whalers Hockey Fest ====
In the early 2010s Baldwin organized the "Whalers Hockey Fest", an outdoor ice hockey festival which featured "up to 20 minor league, college, high school, and youth hockey games at a rink...built at Rentschler Field, the University of Connecticut's football stadium in East Hartford".

=== Honors ===
The WHA's Robert Schmertz Memorial Trophy was originally named the Howard Baldwin Trophy in his honor. In 2010, he was elected as an inaugural inductee into the World Hockey Association Hall of Fame in the builders category.

== Baldwin Entertainment Group ==
In addition to his interest in professional hockey, Baldwin has also pursued a career in film as a producer with his wife and producing partner, Karen Mulvihill Baldwin. The Baldwins produced such films as Mystery, Alaska, Odd Man Rush, Sudden Death, From the Hip, Spellbinder, and Joshua, among others. In 1999, Baldwin co-founded GoCoverage.com with Steve Tisch and Jon Avnet, but soon collapsed. In 2000, he started Crusader Entertainment, but left in 2004 to start Baldwin Entertainment Group.
