= Blair Lamora =

Canadian actress (born 1997)

- Born: September 15, 1997 (age 28); Brampton, Ontario, Canada
- Occupation: Actress
- Years active: 2020–present
- Known for: Shoresy

Blair Lamora (born September 15, 1997) is a Canadian actress known for her role as Ziigwan in the Crave comedy series Shoresy, a spinoff of Letterkenny. She has also appeared in Outlander and Paranormal Nightshift.

== Early life and education ==
Lamora was born in Brampton, Ontario, to an Argentinian mother, Marcela Monica Garro, and Canadian father, Frank Lamorandiere. She is of French Canadian, Ojibwe, and Argentinian descent. Lamora attended Westview Centennial Secondary School, where she was accepted into the school's performing arts theatre program. After graduating, she moved to Toronto to pursue a career in film and television.

== Career ==
After signing with Red Management as her talent manager, Lamora made her professional acting debut in the 2020 supernatural series Paranormal Nightshift, playing the role of a Dead Nurse. The following year, she appeared in the sixth season of the historical drama Outlander, which aired on Starz in March 2022, portraying the character Walela.

Lamora's breakthrough came when she was cast as Ziigwan in Shoresy, a comedy series created by and starring Jared Keeso. The series premiered on Crave in Canada on May 13, 2022, and on Hulu in the United States on May 27, 2022. Her character serves as an assistant to the general manager of the Sudbury Blueberry Bulldogs hockey team. She has appeared in all five seasons of the series.

In 2023, she portrayed Doris Horseknife in the film Café Daughter.

== Filmography ==
=== Film ===
Year	Title	Role	Notes
2023	Café Daughter	Doris Horseknife	

=== Television ===
Year	Title	Role	Notes
2020	Paranormal Nightshift	Dead Nurse	
2022	Outlander	Walela	
2023	Alaska Daily	Nancy	
2022-present	Shoresy	Ziigwan	
