= 2016–17 NHL transactions =

The following is a list of all team-to-team transactions that occurred in the National Hockey League during the 2016–17 NHL season. It lists which team each player has been traded to, signed by, or claimed by, and for which player(s) or draft pick (s), if applicable. Players who have retired are also listed. The 2016–17 NHL trade deadline was on March 1, 2017. Any players traded or claimed off waivers after this date were eligible to play up until, but not in the 2017 Stanley Cup playoffs.

== Retirement ==
Date	Player	Last Team	Ref
June 24, 2016	Pavel Datsyuk	Arizona Coyotes	
June 27, 2016	Louis Leblanc	New York Islanders	
July 1, 2016	Mattias Ohlund	Tampa Bay Lightning	
July 19, 2016	Jason LaBarbera	Philadelphia Flyers	
July 20, 2016	Brad Richards	Detroit Red Wings	
August 16, 2016	Tim Jackman	Chicago Blackhawks	
August 31, 2016	Scott Gomez	Ottawa Senators	
September 8, 2016	Paul Gaustad	Nashville Predators	
September 15, 2016	Matt Lindblad	New York Rangers	
September 16, 2016	Shawn Horcoff	Anaheim Ducks	
October 3, 2016	Cody Hodgson	Nashville Predators	
October 3, 2016	Mike Santorelli	Anaheim Ducks	
October 4, 2016	Barret Jackman	Nashville Predators	
October 5, 2016	Dan Boyle	New York Rangers	
October 11, 2016	Ruslan Fedotenko	Minnesota Wild	
October 27, 2016	Eric Nystrom	Nashville Predators	
October 28, 2016	Raffi Torres	Toronto Maple Leafs	
November 25, 2016	Matt Carle	Nashville Predators	
November 29, 2016	Travis Moen	Dallas Stars	
December 7, 2016	John Scott	Montreal Canadiens	
December 15, 2016	Jarret Stoll	Minnesota Wild	
December 22, 2016	David Legwand	Buffalo Sabres	
January 3, 2017	Tyler Kennedy	New Jersey Devils	
February 8, 2017	Martin Havlat	St. Louis Blues	
February 16, 2017	Alex Tanguay	Arizona Coyotes	
March 31, 2017	Patrik Elias	New Jersey Devils	
April 10, 2017	Shawn Thornton	Florida Panthers	
May 24, 2017	Craig Cunningham	Arizona Coyotes	
May 25, 2017	Steve Ott	Montreal Canadiens	
June 8, 2017	Dillon Fournier	Chicago Blackhawks	
June 9, 2017	Gregory Campbell	Columbus Blue Jackets	
June 14, 2017	Daniel Cleary	Detroit Red Wings	

== Contract terminations ==
A team and player may mutually agree to terminate a player's contract at any time.

For more details on contract terminations:

Teams may buy out player contracts (after the conclusion of a season) for a portion of the remaining value of the contract, paid over a period of twice the remaining length of the contract. This reduced number and extended period is applied to the cap hit as well.

- If the player was under the age of 26 at the time of the buyout the player's pay and cap hit will reduced by a factor of 2/3 over the extended period.
- If the player was 26 or older at the time of the buyout the player's pay and cap hit will reduced by a factor of 1/3 over the extended period.
- If the player was 35 or older at the time of signing the contract the player's pay will be reduced by a factor of 1/3, but the cap hit will not be reduced over the extended period.

All players must clear waivers before having a contract terminated. Injured players cannot be bought out.

Date	Name	Previous team	Notes	Ref
June 24, 2016	Thomas Vanek	Minnesota Wild	Buyout	
June 28, 2016	Chris Higgins	Vancouver Canucks	Buyout	
June 29, 2016	Brad Stuart	Colorado Avalanche	Buyout	
June 29, 2016	Fedor Tyutin	Columbus Blue Jackets	Buyout	
June 30, 2016	Mason Raymond	Calgary Flames	Buyout	
June 30, 2016	Eric Nystrom	Nashville Predators	Buyout	
June 30, 2016	James Wisniewski	Carolina Hurricanes	Buyout	
July 1, 2016	Dennis Seidenberg	Boston Bruins	Buyout	
July 1, 2016	Lauri Korpikoski	Edmonton Oilers	Buyout	
July 1, 2016	Matt Carle	Tampa Bay Lightning	Buyout	
July 1, 2016	Barret Jackman	Nashville Predators	Buyout	
July 1, 2016	Jared Boll	Columbus Blue Jackets	Buyout	
July 25, 2016	David Rundblad	Chicago Blackhawks	Mutual termination	
August 1, 2016	Antoine Vermette	Arizona Coyotes	Buyout	
September 1, 2016	Ben Johnson	New Jersey Devils	Termination	
October 12, 2016	Nathan Gerbe	New York Rangers	Mutual termination	
November 3, 2016	Mason Raymond	Anaheim Ducks	Mutual termination	
November 3, 2016	Calle Andersson	New York Rangers	Mutual termination	
November 13, 2016	Nicklas Grossmann	Calgary Flames	Mutual termination	
November 14, 2016	Jakub Nakladal	Carolina Hurricanes	Termination	
November 18, 2016	Axel Blomqvist	Winnipeg Jets	Mutual termination	
November 25, 2016	Matt Carle	Nashville Predators	Mutual termination	
December 8, 2016	Matia Marcantuoni	Arizona Coyotes	Mutual termination	
December 18, 2016	Gregory Campbell	Columbus Blue Jackets	Mutual termination	
April 14, 2017	Jonathan-Ismael Diaby	Nashville Predators	Mutual termination	
June 15, 2017	Dan Girardi	New York Rangers	Buyout	
June 15, 2017	Francois Beauchemin	Colorado Avalanche	Buyout	
June 16, 2017	Simon Despres	Anaheim Ducks	Buyout	

== Free agency ==
Note: This does not include players who have re-signed with their previous team as an unrestricted free agent or as a restricted free agent.

Date	Player	New team	Previous team	Ref
July 1, 2016	Milan Lucic	Edmonton Oilers	Los Angeles Kings	
July 1, 2016	James Reimer	Florida Panthers	San Jose Sharks	
July 1, 2016	Stuart Percy	Pittsburgh Penguins	Toronto Maple Leafs	
July 1, 2016	Andrew Ladd	New York Islanders	Chicago Blackhawks	
July 1, 2016	Dale Weise	Philadelphia Flyers	Chicago Blackhawks	
July 1, 2016	Colton Sceviour	Florida Panthers	Dallas Stars	
July 1, 2016	David Perron	St. Louis Blues	Anaheim Ducks	
July 1, 2016	Frans Nielsen	Detroit Red Wings	New York Islanders	
July 1, 2016	David Backes	Boston Bruins	St. Louis Blues	
July 1, 2016	Loui Eriksson	Vancouver Canucks	Boston Bruins	
July 1, 2016	Jonathan Marchessault	Florida Panthers	Tampa Bay Lightning	
July 1, 2016	Anton Khudobin	Boston Bruins	Anaheim Ducks	
July 1, 2016	Brian Campbell	Chicago Blackhawks	Florida Panthers	
July 1, 2016	Michael Bournival	Tampa Bay Lightning	Montreal Canadiens	
July 1, 2016	Troy Brouwer	Calgary Flames	St. Louis Blues	
July 1, 2016	Kyle Okposo	Buffalo Sabres	New York Islanders	
July 1, 2016	Eric Staal	Minnesota Wild	New York Rangers	
July 1, 2016	Carter Hutton	St. Louis Blues	Nashville Predators	
July 1, 2016	Tom Gilbert	Los Angeles Kings	Montreal Canadiens	
July 1, 2016	Chris Stewart	Minnesota Wild	Anaheim Ducks	
July 1, 2016	Chad Johnson	Calgary Flames	Buffalo Sabres	
July 1, 2016	Ben Lovejoy	New Jersey Devils	Pittsburgh Penguins	
July 1, 2016	Jason Chimera	New York Islanders	Washington Capitals	
July 1, 2016	Jamie McGinn	Arizona Coyotes	Anaheim Ducks	
July 1, 2016	Vernon Fiddler	New Jersey Devils	Dallas Stars	
July 1, 2016	Sam Carrick	Chicago Blackhawks	Toronto Maple Leafs	
July 1, 2016	Alex Stalock	Minnesota Wild	Toronto Maple Leafs	
July 1, 2016	David Schlemko	San Jose Sharks	New Jersey Devils	
July 1, 2016	Adam Clendening	New York Rangers	Edmonton Oilers	
July 1, 2016	David Warsofsky	Pittsburgh Penguins	New Jersey Devils	
July 1, 2016	Taylor Fedun	Buffalo Sabres	Vancouver Canucks	
July 1, 2016	Cameron Gaunce	Pittsburgh Penguins	Florida Panthers	
July 1, 2016	Jonas Gustavsson	Edmonton Oilers	Boston Bruins	
July 1, 2016	Zach Trotman	Los Angeles Kings	Boston Bruins	
July 1, 2016	Viktor Stalberg	Carolina Hurricanes	New York Rangers	
July 1, 2016	Christian Thomas	Washington Capitals	Arizona Coyotes	
July 1, 2016	Chad Ruhwedel	Pittsburgh Penguins	Buffalo Sabres	
July 1, 2016	Michael Chaput	Vancouver Canucks	Columbus Blue Jackets	
July 1, 2016	Al Montoya	Montreal Canadiens	Florida Panthers	
July 1, 2016	Yannick Weber	Nashville Predators	Vancouver Canucks	
July 1, 2016	Andy Miele	Philadelphia Flyers	Detroit Red Wings	
July 1, 2016	Jamie McBain	Arizona Coyotes	Los Angeles Kings	
July 1, 2016	Shawn Matthias	Winnipeg Jets	Colorado Avalanche	
July 1, 2016	Matt Irwin	Nashville Predators	Boston Bruins	
July 1, 2016	Jeff Zatkoff	Los Angeles Kings	Pittsburgh Penguins	
July 1, 2016	Andrew Miller	Carolina Hurricanes	Edmonton Oilers	
July 1, 2016	Dan Hamhuis	Dallas Stars	Vancouver Canucks	
July 1, 2016	Michael Grabner	New York Rangers	Toronto Maple Leafs	
July 1, 2016	Nathan Gerbe	New York Rangers	Carolina Hurricanes	
July 1, 2016	Ryan Stanton	Colorado Avalanche	Washington Capitals	
July 1, 2016	Turner Elson	Colorado Avalanche	Calgary Flames	
July 1, 2016	Michael Latta	Los Angeles Kings	Washington Capitals	
July 1, 2016	Zach Redmond	Montreal Canadiens	Colorado Avalanche	
July 1, 2016	Boyd Gordon	Philadelphia Flyers	Arizona Coyotes	
July 1, 2016	Andrew Agozzino	St. Louis Blues	Colorado Avalanche	
July 1, 2016	Lee Stempniak	Carolina Hurricanes	Boston Bruins	
July 1, 2016	Brett Connolly	Washington Capitals	Boston Bruins	
July 1, 2016	Patrick Wiercioch	Colorado Avalanche	Ottawa Senators	
July 1, 2016	Joe Colborne	Colorado Avalanche	Calgary Flames	
July 1, 2016	Justin Falk	Buffalo Sabres	Columbus Blue Jackets	
July 1, 2016	Pat Cannone	Minnesota Wild	St. Louis Blues	
July 1, 2016	Fedor Tyutin	Colorado Avalanche	Columbus Blue Jackets	
July 1, 2016	Jeremy Morin	Tampa Bay Lightning	San Jose Sharks	
July 1, 2016	Quinton Howden	Winnipeg Jets	Florida Panthers	
July 1, 2016	Will O'Neill	Philadelphia Flyers	Pittsburgh Penguins	
July 1, 2016	Gabriel Dumont	Tampa Bay Lightning	Montreal Canadiens	
July 1, 2016	Pierre-Luc Letourneau-Leblond	Tampa Bay Lightning	New Jersey Devils	
July 1, 2016	Justin Peters	Arizona Coyotes	Washington Capitals	
July 1, 2016	Matt Martin	Toronto Maple Leafs	New York Islanders	
July 1, 2016	Thomas Vanek	Detroit Red Wings	Minnesota Wild	
July 1, 2016	Mark Fraser	Edmonton Oilers	Ottawa Senators	
July 1, 2016	Joe Cannata	Washington Capitals	Vancouver Canucks	
July 1, 2016	Darren Dietz	Washington Capitals	Montreal Canadiens	
July 1, 2016	Harry Zolnierczyk	Nashville Predators	Anaheim Ducks	
July 1, 2016	Garret Ross	Arizona Coyotes	Chicago Blackhawks	
July 1, 2016	Mike Blunden	Ottawa Senators	Tampa Bay Lightning	
July 1, 2016	Victor Bartley	Minnesota Wild	Montreal Canadiens	
July 1, 2016	Ryan White	Arizona Coyotes	Philadelphia Flyers	
July 1, 2016	Steve Ott	Detroit Red Wings	St. Louis Blues	
July 1, 2016	Andrew Bodnarchuk	Dallas Stars	Colorado Avalanche	
July 1, 2016	Brian Strait	Winnipeg Jets	New York Islanders	
July 1, 2016	Michael Paliotta	New York Rangers	Columbus Blue Jackets	
July 1, 2016	Teddy Purcell	Los Angeles Kings	Florida Panthers	
July 1, 2016	Mikkel Boedker	San Jose Sharks	Colorado Avalanche	
July 1, 2016	Riley Nash	Boston Bruins	Carolina Hurricanes	
July 1, 2016	Tim Schaller	Boston Bruins	Buffalo Sabres	
July 1, 2016	Jayson Megna	Vancouver Canucks	New York Rangers	
July 1, 2016	Borna Rendulic	Vancouver Canucks	Colorado Avalanche	
July 1, 2016	Chris Mueller	Arizona Coyotes	Anaheim Ducks	
July 1, 2016	Ben Street	Detroit Red Wings	Colorado Avalanche	
July 1, 2016	Carter Camper	New Jersey Devils	Washington Capitals	
July 1, 2016	Andrew MacWilliam	New Jersey Devils	Winnipeg Jets	
July 1, 2016	Morgan Ellis	St. Louis Blues	Montreal Canadiens	
July 1, 2016	Jeremy Smith	Colorado Avalanche	Boston Bruins	
July 1, 2016	Jim O'Brien	Colorado Avalanche	New Jersey Devils	
July 1, 2016	Mike Sislo	Colorado Avalanche	New Jersey Devils	
July 1, 2016	Joe Whitney	Colorado Avalanche	New York Islanders	
July 1, 2016	Karl Stollery	New Jersey Devils	San Jose Sharks	
July 1, 2016	Kenny Agostino	St. Louis Blues	Calgary Flames	
July 2, 2016	Alex Friesen	St. Louis Blues	Vancouver Canucks	
July 2, 2016	Brad Hunt	St. Louis Blues	Edmonton Oilers	
July 2, 2016	Jason Demers	Florida Panthers	Dallas Stars	
July 2, 2016	Philip Samuelsson	Montreal Canadiens	Arizona Coyotes	
July 2, 2016	Derek Grant	Buffalo Sabres	Calgary Flames	
July 2, 2016	Chris Terry	Montreal Canadiens	Carolina Hurricanes	
July 2, 2016	Roman Polak	Toronto Maple Leafs	San Jose Sharks	
July 2, 2016	P.A. Parenteau	New York Islanders	Toronto Maple Leafs	
July 2, 2016	Brad Malone	Washington Capitals	Carolina Hurricanes	
July 2, 2016	Nate Guenin	Anaheim Ducks	Colorado Avalanche	
July 3, 2016	Matt Tennyson	Carolina Hurricanes	San Jose Sharks	
July 3, 2016	Adam Cracknell	Dallas Stars	Edmonton Oilers	
July 3, 2016	Taylor Beck	Edmonton Oilers	Colorado Avalanche	
July 3, 2016	Mike Liambas	Nashville Predators	Chicago Blackhawks	
July 4, 2016	Mason Raymond	Anaheim Ducks	Calgary Flames	
July 4, 2016	Alex Grant	Boston Bruins	Arizona Coyotes	
July 5, 2016	T.J. Brennan	Philadelphia Flyers	Toronto Maple Leafs	
July 5, 2016	Linden Vey	Calgary Flames	Vancouver Canucks	
July 5, 2016	Jordin Tootoo	Chicago Blackhawks	New Jersey Devils	
July 5, 2016	Luke Gazdic	New Jersey Devils	Edmonton Oilers	
July 5, 2016	Jared Boll	Anaheim Ducks	Columbus Blue Jackets	
July 5, 2016	Jeff Schultz	Anaheim Ducks	Los Angeles Kings	
July 7, 2016	Garrett Wilson	Pittsburgh Penguins	Florida Panthers	
July 7, 2016	Chris Kelly	Ottawa Senators	Boston Bruins	
July 8, 2016	Landon Ferraro	St. Louis Blues	Boston Bruins	
July 9, 2016	Mike Halmo	Tampa Bay Lightning	New York Islanders	
July 11, 2016	Dan Kelly	San Jose Sharks	New Jersey Devils	
July 15, 2016	Josh Jooris	New York Rangers	Calgary Flames	
July 22, 2016	Bobby Farnham	Montreal Canadiens	New Jersey Devils	
July 23, 2016	Luke Schenn	Arizona Coyotes	Los Angeles Kings	
July 27, 2016	Matt Carle	Nashville Predators	Tampa Bay Lightning	
July 28, 2016	Brandon Gormley	New Jersey Devils	Colorado Avalanche	
August 1, 2016	Sam Gagner	Columbus Blue Jackets	Philadelphia Flyers	
August 15, 2016	Antoine Vermette	Anaheim Ducks	Arizona Coyotes	
August 16, 2016	Radim Vrbata	Arizona Coyotes	Vancouver Canucks	
August 16, 2016	Ben Smith	Colorado Avalanche	Toronto Maple Leafs	
August 17, 2016	John Gilmour	New York Rangers	Calgary Flames	
August 19, 2016	Thomas Di Pauli	Pittsburgh Penguins	Washington Capitals	
August 19, 2016	Jimmy Vesey	New York Rangers	Buffalo Sabres	
August 22, 2016	Jhonas Enroth	Toronto Maple Leafs	Los Angeles Kings	
August 23, 2016	Jiri Hudler	Dallas Stars	Florida Panthers	
August 25, 2016	Brandon Pirri	New York Rangers	Anaheim Ducks	
August 27, 2016	Matt Benning	Edmonton Oilers	Boston Bruins	
August 30, 2016	Dominic Moore	Boston Bruins	New York Rangers	
September 7, 2016	Michael Leighton	Carolina Hurricanes	Chicago Blackhawks	
September 28, 2016	Kyle Quincey	New Jersey Devils	Detroit Red Wings	
September 28, 2016	Dennis Seidenberg	New York Islanders	Boston Bruins	
October 7, 2016	Kris Russell	Edmonton Oilers	Dallas Stars	
October 9, 2016	Jakub Nakladal	Carolina Hurricanes	Calgary Flames	
October 10, 2016	Lauri Korpikoski	Dallas Stars	Edmonton Oilers	
October 10, 2016	Gabriel Bourque	Colorado Avalanche	Nashville Predators	
October 10, 2016	Rene Bourque	Colorado Avalanche	Columbus Blue Jackets	
October 11, 2016	Kris Versteeg	Calgary Flames	Los Angeles Kings	
October 11, 2016	Nicklas Grossmann	Calgary Flames	Arizona Coyotes	
October 13, 2016	Jack Skille	Vancouver Canucks	Colorado Avalanche	
October 15, 2016	Justin Fontaine	New York Rangers	Minnesota Wild	
October 16, 2016	Tom McCollum	Calgary Flames	Detroit Red Wings	
November 30, 2016	Adam Pardy	Nashville Predators	Edmonton Oilers	
December 21, 2016	Stephen Gionta	New York Islanders	New Jersey Devils	
February 16, 2017	Matt Bartkowski	Calgary Flames	Vancouver Canucks	
February 28, 2017	Mike Weber	Minnesota Wild	Washington Capitals	
March 1, 2017	Ryan Mantha	Edmonton Oilers	New York Rangers	
March 6, 2017	Reid Duke	Vegas Golden Knights	Minnesota Wild	
March 12, 2017	Drew Shore	Vancouver Canucks	Calgary Flames	

=== Imports ===
This section is for players who were not previously on contract with NHL teams in the past season. Listed is their previous team and the league that they belonged to.

Date	Player	New team	Previous team	League	Ref
July 1, 2016	Pierre-Cedric Labrie	Chicago Blackhawks	Rockford IceHogs	AHL	
July 1, 2016	Spencer Abbott	Chicago Blackhawks	Frolunda HC	SHL	
July 1, 2016	Trent Vogelhuber	Colorado Avalanche	Lake Erie Monsters	AHL	
July 1, 2016	Reid Petryk	Colorado Avalanche	San Antonio Rampage	AHL	
July 1, 2016	Dante Salituro	Columbus Blue Jackets	Ottawa 67's	OHL	
July 1, 2016	Dustin Stevenson	Dallas Stars	Stockton Heat	AHL	
July 1, 2016	Matt Lorito	Detroit Red Wings	Albany Devils	AHL	
July 1, 2016	Eddie Pasquale	Detroit Red Wings	St. John's IceCaps	AHL	
July 1, 2016	Alexander Radulov	Montreal Canadiens	CSKA Moscow	KHL	
July 1, 2016	Chad Nehring	Ottawa Senators	Hartford Wolf Pack	AHL	
July 1, 2016	Greg Carey	Philadelphia Flyers	Springfield Falcons	AHL	
July 1, 2016	Chad Billins	Vancouver Canucks	Linkopings HC	SHL	
July 2, 2016	Trevor Smith	Nashville Predators	SC Bern	NLA	
July 2, 2016	Wade Megan	St. Louis Blues	Portland Pirates	AHL	
July 5, 2016	Jacob Graves	Columbus Blue Jackets	London Knights	OHL	
July 11, 2016	Roman Lyubimov	Philadelphia Flyers	CSKA Moscow	KHL	
July 13, 2016	Cory Conacher	Tampa Bay Lightning	SC Bern	NLA	
July 14, 2016	Patrick Bjorkstrand	Los Angeles Kings	KHL Medvescak Zagreb	KHL	
July 15, 2016	Michael Carcone	Vancouver Canucks	Drummondville Voltigeurs	QMJHL	
July 21, 2016	Erik Burgdoerfer	Buffalo Sabres	Hershey Bears	AHL	
July 26, 2016	Trevor Moore	Toronto Maple Leafs	Denver Pioneers	NCAA	
September 22, 2016	Matt Luff	Los Angeles Kings	Hamilton Bulldogs	OHL	
September 25, 2016	Alexandre Fortin	Chicago Blackhawks	Rouyn-Noranda Huskies	QMJHL	
September 29, 2016	Ondrej Vala	Dallas Stars	Kamloops Blazers	WHL	
October 3, 2016	Colby Sissons	New Jersey Devils	Swift Current Broncos	WHL	
October 6, 2016	Jalen Smereck	Arizona Coyotes	Flint Firebirds	OHL	
October 11, 2016	Devin Setoguchi	Los Angeles Kings	HC Davos	NLA	
October 13, 2016	Lane Pederson	Arizona Coyotes	Swift Current Broncos	WHL	
January 7, 2017	Markus Eisenschmid	Montreal Canadiens	St. John's IceCaps	AHL	
February 22, 2017	Connor Jones	New York Islanders	Bridgeport Sound Tigers	AHL	
February 23, 2017	Jeff Glass	Chicago Blackhawks	Rockford IceHogs	AHL	
February 27, 2017	Kevin Rooney	New Jersey Devils	Albany Devils	AHL	
February 28, 2017	Chris DiDomenico	Ottawa Senators	SCL Tigers	NLA	
February 28, 2017	Marc-Andre Bergeron	Columbus Blue Jackets	ZSC Lions	NLA	
March 2, 2017	Matthew Highmore	Chicago Blackhawks	Saint John Sea Dogs	QMJHL	
March 2, 2017	Mason Mitchell	Washington Capitals	Alaska Anchorage Seawolves	NCAA	
March 3, 2017	Zack MacEwen	Vancouver Canucks	Gatineau Olympiques	QMJHL	
March 7, 2017	Kristofers Bindulis	Washington Capitals	Lake Superior State Lakers	NCAA	
March 7, 2017	Hampus Gustafsson	Washington Capitals	Merrimack Warriors	NCAA	
March 10, 2017	Landon Bow	Dallas Stars	Texas Stars	AHL	
March 13, 2017	Jalen Chatfield	Vancouver Canucks	Windsor Spitfires	OHL	
March 14, 2017	Zach Aston-Reese	Pittsburgh Penguins	Northeastern Huskies	NCAA	
March 15, 2017	Gavin Bayreuther	Dallas Stars	St. Lawrence Saints	NCAA	
March 17, 2017	Miro Aaltonen	Toronto Maple Leafs	HC Vityaz	KHL	
March 19, 2017	Tim Clifton	San Jose Sharks	Quinnipiac Bobcats	NCAA	
March 19, 2017	Ryan Lomberg	Calgary Flames	Stockton Heat	AHL	
March 20, 2017	Mitch Hults	Anaheim Ducks	Lake Superior State Lakers	NCAA	
March 23, 2017	Chris Nell	New York Rangers	Bowling Green Falcons	NCAA	
March 25, 2017	Josh Healey	Calgary Flames	Ohio State Buckeyes	NCAA	
March 27, 2017	John Stevens	New York Islanders	Northeastern Huskies	NCAA	
March 27, 2017	Vinni Lettieri	New York Rangers	Minnesota Golden Gophers	NCAA	
March 28, 2017	Michael Kapla	New Jersey Devils	UMass Lowell River Hawks	NCAA	
March 28, 2017	Vince Pedrie	New York Rangers	Penn State Nittany Lions	NCAA	
March 28, 2017	Joseph Gambardella	Edmonton Oilers	UMass Lowell River Hawks	NCAA	
March 28, 2017	Griffen Molino	Vancouver Canucks	Western Michigan Broncos	NCAA	
March 29, 2017	Justin Kloos	Minnesota Wild	Minnesota Golden Gophers	NCAA	
March 29, 2017	Tanner Fritz	New York Islanders	Bridgeport Sound Tigers	AHL	
March 30, 2017	C.J. Smith	Buffalo Sabres	UMass Lowell River Hawks	NCAA	
March 30, 2017	Nick DeSimone	San Jose Sharks	Union Dutchmen	NCAA	
March 31, 2017	Mike Vecchione	Philadelphia Flyers	Union Dutchmen	NCAA	
March 31, 2017	Angus Redmond	Anaheim Ducks	Michigan Tech Huskies	NCAA	
April 10, 2017	Shane Starrett	Edmonton Oilers	Air Force Falcons	NCAA	
April 15, 2017	Hunter Miska	Arizona Coyotes	Minnesota–Duluth Bulldogs	NCAA	
April 18, 2017	Alex Iafallo	Los Angeles Kings	Minnesota–Duluth Bulldogs	NCAA	
April 18, 2017	Giovanni Fiore	Anaheim Ducks	Cape Breton Screaming Eagles	QMJHL	
April 20, 2017	Yaroslav Dyblenko	New Jersey Devils	HC Spartak Moscow	KHL	
April 21, 2017	Alexei Bereglazov	New York Rangers	Metallurg Magnitogorsk	KHL	
April 28, 2017	Antoine Waked	Montreal Canadiens	Rouyn-Noranda Huskies	QMJHL	
May 1, 2017	Jakub Jerabek	Montreal Canadiens	HC Vityaz	KHL	
May 1, 2017	Neal Pionk	New York Rangers	Minnesota–Duluth Bulldogs	NCAA	
May 1, 2017	David Kampf	Chicago Blackhawks	Pirati Chomutov	ELH	
May 2, 2017	Matej Machovsky	Detroit Red Wings	HC Plzen	ELH	
May 3, 2017	Oscar Fantenberg	Los Angeles Kings	HC Sochi	KHL	
May 4, 2017	Vadim Shipachyov	Vegas Golden Knights	SKA Saint Petersburg	KHL	
May 8, 2017	Dawson Leedahl	New York Rangers	Regina Pats	WHL	
May 15, 2017	Victor Ejdsell	Nashville Predators	HV71	SHL	
May 16, 2017	Mario Kempe	Arizona Coyotes	HC Vityaz	KHL	
May 16, 2017	Calle Rosen	Toronto Maple Leafs	Vaxjo Lakers	SHL	
May 16, 2017	Andreas Borgman	Toronto Maple Leafs	HV71	SHL	
May 23, 2017	Radim Simek	San Jose Sharks	HC Bili Tygri Liberec	ELH	
May 23, 2017	Filip Sandberg	San Jose Sharks	HV71	SHL	
May 24, 2017	Libor Sulak	Detroit Red Wings	Orli Znojmo	EBEL	
May 25, 2017	Matiss Kivlenieks	Columbus Blue Jackets	Sioux City Musketeers	USHL	
May 25, 2017	Viktor Antipin	Buffalo Sabres	Metallurg Magnitogorsk	KHL	
May 26, 2017	Philip Holm	Vancouver Canucks	Vaxjo Lakers	SHL	
June 1, 2017	Henrik Haapala	Florida Panthers	Tappara	Liiga	
June 1, 2017	Tomas Hyka	Vegas Golden Knights	BK Mlada Boleslav	ELH	
June 7, 2017	Jan Rutta	Chicago Blackhawks	Pirati Chomutov	ELH	

== Trades ==
* Retained Salary Transaction: Each team is allowed up to three contracts on their payroll where they have retained salary in a trade (i.e. the player no longer plays with Team A due to a trade to Team B, but Team A still retains some salary). Only up to 50% of a player's contract can be kept, and only up to 15% of a team's salary cap can be taken up by retained salary. A contract can only be involved in one of these trades twice.

Hover over retained salary or conditional transactions/considerations for more information.

=== June ===
June 24, 2016	To Washington Capitals Lars Eller	To Montreal Canadiens 2nd-round pick in 2017; 2nd-round pick in 2018
June 24, 2016	To Montreal Canadiens Andrew Shaw	To Chicago Blackhawks 2nd-round pick in 2016; MIN's 2nd-round pick in 2016
June 24, 2016	To Calgary Flames Brian Elliott	To St. Louis Blues 2nd-round pick in 2016 conditional 3rd-round pick in 2018
June 24, 2016	To Arizona Coyotes Pavel Datsyuk; 1st-round pick in 2016	To Detroit Red Wings Joe Vitale; NYR's 1st-round pick in 2016; 2nd-round pick in 2016
June 25, 2016	To Buffalo Sabres Dmitry Kulikov; VAN's 2nd-round pick in 2016	To Florida Panthers Mark Pysyk; 2nd-round pick in 2016; STL's 3rd-round pick in 2016
June 25, 2016	To Arizona Coyotes Tony DeAngelo	To Tampa Bay Lightning 2nd-round pick in 2016
June 25, 2016	To New Jersey Devils Beau Bennett	To Pittsburgh Penguins DET's 3rd-round pick in 2016
June 25, 2016	To Los Angeles Kings Jack Campbell	To Dallas Stars Nick Ebert
June 25, 2016	To Toronto Maple Leafs Kerby Rychel	To Columbus Blue Jackets Scott Harrington conditional 5th-round pick in 2017
June 25, 2016	To New York Rangers Nick Holden	To Colorado Avalanche 4th-round pick in 2017
June 27, 2016	To Calgary Flames Alex Chiasson	To Ottawa Senators Patrick Sieloff
June 29, 2016	To New Jersey Devils Taylor Hall	To Edmonton Oilers Adam Larsson
June 29, 2016	To Montreal Canadiens Shea Weber	To Nashville Predators P.K. Subban

Pick-only 2016 NHL entry draft trades
June 24, 2016	To Ottawa Senators 1st-round pick in 2016 (#11 overall)	To New Jersey Devils 1st-round pick in 2016 (#12 overall); NYI's 3rd-round pick in 2016 (#80 overall)
June 24, 2016	To Winnipeg Jets 1st-round pick in 2016 (#18 overall); 3rd-round pick in 2016 (#79 overall)	To Philadelphia Flyers CHI's 1st-round pick in 2016 (#22 overall); 2nd-round pick in 2016 (#36 overall)
June 24, 2016	To St. Louis Blues 1st-round pick in 2016 (#26 overall)	To Washington Capitals 1st-round pick in 2016 (#28 overall); WSH's 3rd-round pick in 2016 (#87 overall)
June 25, 2016	To New York Islanders CBJ's 4th-round pick in 2016 (#95 overall)	To Chicago Blackhawks 4th-round pick in 2016 (#110 overall); 6th-round pick in 2017
June 25, 2016	To New York Islanders SJS' 4th-round pick in 2016 (#120 overall)	To Philadelphia Flyers 4th-round pick in 2017
June 25, 2016	To St. Louis Blues FLA's 5th-round pick in 2016 (#144 overall)	To Chicago Blackhawks 5th-round pick in 2017
June 25, 2016	To Montreal Canadiens 7th-round pick in 2016 (#187 overall)	To Winnipeg Jets 7th-round pick in 2017
June 25, 2016	To Florida Panthers 7th-round pick in 2016 (#195 overall)	To Boston Bruins 7th-round pick in 2017

=== July ===
July 2, 2016	To Buffalo Sabres Anders Nilsson	To St. Louis Blues 5th-round pick in 2017
July 8, 2016	To Anaheim Ducks Jonathan Bernier	To Toronto Maple Leafs conditional 2nd-round pick in 2017 or 3rd-round pick in 2017
July 18, 2016	To Ottawa Senators Derick Brassard; 7th-round pick in 2018	To New York Rangers Mika Zibanejad; 2nd-round pick in 2018

=== August ===
August 25, 2016	To Arizona Coyotes Dave Bolland; Lawson Crouse	To Florida Panthers conditional 3rd-round pick in 2017 conditional 2nd-round pick in 2018

=== October ===
October 7, 2016	To St. Louis Blues Nail Yakupov	To Edmonton Oilers Zach Pochiro conditional 3rd-round pick in 2017 or 2nd-round pick in 2018
October 8, 2016	To Florida Panthers Tim Bozon	To Montreal Canadiens Jonathan Racine
October 11, 2016	To Florida Panthers Brody Sutter	To Carolina Hurricanes Connor Brickley

=== November ===
November 2, 2016	To Ottawa Senators Mike Condon	To Pittsburgh Penguins 5th-round pick in 2017
November 8, 2016	To Florida Panthers Dylan McIlrath	To New York Rangers Steven Kampfer conditional 7th-round pick in 2018
November 12, 2016	To New Jersey Devils Petr Straka	To Philadelphia Flyers conditional 7th-round pick in 2017 or 7th-round pick in 2018
November 16, 2016	To Anaheim Ducks Logan Shaw	To Florida Panthers Michael Sgarbossa
November 19, 2016	To Pittsburgh Penguins Danny Kristo	To St. Louis Blues Reid McNeill
November 28, 2016	To Columbus Blue Jackets Ryan Stanton	To Colorado Avalanche Cody Goloubef

=== December ===
December 9, 2016	To Arizona Coyotes Peter Holland	To Toronto Maple Leafs conditional 6th-round pick in 2018

=== January ===
January 10, 2017	To Anaheim Ducks Jhonas Enroth	To Toronto Maple Leafs 7th-round pick in 2018
January 13, 2017	To Nashville Predators Cody McLeod*	To Colorado Avalanche Felix Girard
January 19, 2017	To Nashville Predators Andrew O'Brien	To Anaheim Ducks Max Gortz
January 21, 2017	To Chicago Blackhawks Michael Latta	To Los Angeles Kings Cameron Schilling
January 24, 2017	To Ottawa Senators Tommy Wingels*	To San Jose Sharks Zack Stortini; Buddy Robinson; 7th-round pick in 2017
January 26, 2017	To Montreal Canadiens Nikita Nesterov	To Tampa Bay Lightning Jonathan Racine; 6th-round pick in 2017

=== February ===
February 1, 2017	To Ottawa Senators Marc Hagel	To Minnesota Wild future considerations
February 1, 2017	To Dallas Stars Justin Peters; Justin Hache	To Arizona Coyotes Brendan Ranford; Branden Troock
February 1, 2017	To Edmonton Oilers Henrik Samuelsson	To Arizona Coyotes Mitch Moroz
February 4, 2017	To Nashville Predators Vernon Fiddler	To New Jersey Devils 4th-round pick in 2017
February 15, 2017	To Washington Capitals Tom Gilbert*	To Los Angeles Kings conditional 5th-round pick in 2017
February 18, 2017	To Toronto Maple Leafs Sergey Kalinin	To New Jersey Devils Viktor Loov
February 20, 2017	To Calgary Flames Michael Stone*	To Arizona Coyotes 3rd-round pick in 2017 conditional 5th-round pick in 2018
February 21, 2017	To Carolina Hurricanes Philip Samuelsson	To Montreal Canadiens Keegan Lowe
February 23, 2017	To Pittsburgh Penguins Ron Hainsey*	To Carolina Hurricanes Danny Kristo; 2nd-round pick in 2017
February 24, 2017	To Anaheim Ducks Patrick Eaves	To Dallas Stars conditional 2nd-round pick in 2017
February 24, 2017	To Chicago Blackhawks Tomas Jurco	To Detroit Red Wings 3rd-round pick in 2017
February 25, 2017	To Arizona Coyotes Jeremy Morin	To Tampa Bay Lightning Stefan Fournier
February 26, 2017	To Los Angeles Kings Ben Bishop*; 5th-round pick in 2017	To Tampa Bay Lightning Peter Budaj; Erik Cernak conditional 2nd-round pick in 2017; 7th-round pick in 2017
February 26, 2017	To Minnesota Wild Martin Hanzal*; Ryan White; 4th-round pick in 2017	To Arizona Coyotes Grayson Downing; 1st-round pick in 2017; 2nd-round pick in 2018 conditional 4th-round pick in 2019
February 27, 2017	To Arizona Coyotes Teemu Pulkkinen	To Minnesota Wild future considerations
February 27, 2017	To Toronto Maple Leafs Brian Boyle	To Tampa Bay Lightning Byron Froese conditional 2nd-round pick in 2017
February 27, 2017	To Montreal Canadiens Jordie Benn	To Dallas Stars Greg Pateryn; 4th-round pick in 2017
February 27, 2017	To Ottawa Senators Alex Burrows	To Vancouver Canucks Jonathan Dahlen
February 27, 2017	To Washington Capitals Kevin Shattenkirk*; Pheonix Copley	To St. Louis Blues Zach Sanford; Brad Malone; 1st-round pick in 2017 conditional 2nd-round pick in 2019 conditional 7th-round pick
February 28, 2017	To New York Rangers Brendan Smith	To Detroit Red Wings 3rd-round pick in 2017; OTT's 2nd-round pick in 2018
February 28, 2017	To Ottawa Senators Viktor Stalberg	To Carolina Hurricanes 3rd-round pick in 2017
February 28, 2017	To New York Rangers Daniel Catenacci	To Buffalo Sabres Mat Bodie
February 28, 2017	To Chicago Blackhawks Johnny Oduya*	To Dallas Stars Mark McNeill conditional 4th-round pick in 2018
February 28, 2017	To Edmonton Oilers David Desharnais*	To Montreal Canadiens Brandon Davidson

=== March ===
March 1, 2017	To San Jose Sharks Jannik Hansen*	To Vancouver Canucks Nikolay Goldobin conditional 4th-round pick in 2017
March 1, 2017	To Montreal Canadiens Steve Ott	To Detroit Red Wings 6th-round pick in 2018
March 1, 2017	To Arizona Coyotes Joe Whitney	To Colorado Avalanche Brendan Ranford
March 1, 2017	To Colorado Avalanche Joe Cannata	To Washington Capitals Cody Corbett
March 1, 2017	To Montreal Canadiens Dwight King	To Los Angeles Kings conditional 4th-round pick in 2018
March 1, 2017	To Florida Panthers Thomas Vanek*	To Detroit Red Wings Dylan McIlrath conditional 3rd-round pick in 2017
March 1, 2017	To Los Angeles Kings Jarome Iginla*	To Colorado Avalanche conditional 4th-round pick in 2018
March 1, 2017	To Tampa Bay Lightning Mike McKenna	To Florida Panthers Adam Wilcox
March 1, 2017	To Edmonton Oilers Justin Fontaine	To New York Rangers Taylor Beck
March 1, 2017	To Columbus Blue Jackets Kyle Quincey	To New Jersey Devils Dalton Prout
March 1, 2017	To Colorado Avalanche Sven Andrighetto	To Montreal Canadiens Andreas Martinsen
March 1, 2017	To Philadelphia Flyers Valtteri Filppula; 4th-round pick in 2017 conditional 7th-round pick in 2017	To Tampa Bay Lightning Mark Streit*
March 1, 2017	To Nashville Predators P.A. Parenteau	To New Jersey Devils 6th-round pick in 2017
March 1, 2017	To Calgary Flames Curtis Lazar; Michael Kostka	To Ottawa Senators Jyrki Jokipakka; 2nd-round pick in 2017
March 1, 2017	To Toronto Maple Leafs Eric Fehr; Steven Oleksy; 4th-round pick in 2017	To Pittsburgh Penguins Frank Corrado
March 1, 2017	To Pittsburgh Penguins Mark Streit*	To Tampa Bay Lightning 4th-round pick in 2018
March 1, 2017	To Boston Bruins Drew Stafford	To Winnipeg Jets conditional 6th-round pick in 2018
March 1, 2017	To Columbus Blue Jackets Lauri Korpikoski	To Dallas Stars Dillon Heatherington
March 1, 2017	To Florida Panthers Reece Scarlett	To New Jersey Devils Shane Harper
March 1, 2017	To Anaheim Ducks Spencer Abbott; Sam Carrick	To Chicago Blackhawks Kenton Helgesen; 7th-round pick in 2019
March 6, 2017	To Ottawa Senators Brandon Gormley	To New Jersey Devils future considerations

=== April ===
April 28, 2017	To Carolina Hurricanes Scott Darling	To Chicago Blackhawks OTT's 3rd-round pick in 2017

=== May ===
May 9, 2017	To Dallas Stars Ben Bishop	To Los Angeles Kings MTL's 4th-round pick in 2017
May 31, 2017	To Los Angeles Kings Bokondji Imama	To Tampa Bay Lightning conditional 7th-round pick in 2018

=== June (2017) ===
June 14, 2017	To Washington Capitals Tyler Graovac	To Minnesota Wild 5th-round pick in 2018
June 15, 2017	To Montreal Canadiens Jonathan Drouin conditional 6th-round pick in 2018	To Tampa Bay Lightning Mikhail Sergachev conditional WSH's 2nd-round pick in 2018
June 16, 2017	To Arizona Coyotes Nick Cousins; Merrick Madsen	To Philadelphia Flyers Brendan Warren; 5th-round pick in 2018
June 17, 2017	To Buffalo Sabres Nathan Beaulieu	To Montreal Canadiens 3rd-round pick in 2017
June 17, 2017	To Calgary Flames Mike Smith*	To Arizona Coyotes Chad Johnson; Brandon Hickey conditional 2nd-round pick in 2018 or 3rd-round pick in 2018
June 17, 2017	To New Jersey Devils Mirco Mueller; 5th-round pick in 2017	To San Jose Sharks BOS' 2nd-round pick in 2017; NSH's 4th-round pick in 2017
June 21, 2017	To Vegas Golden Knights 6th-round pick in 2017	To Buffalo Sabres future considerations
June 21, 2017	To Vegas Golden Knights Reilly Smith future considerations	To Florida Panthers 4th-round pick in 2018
June 21, 2017	To Vegas Golden Knights BOS' 5th-round pick in 2017	To Carolina Hurricanes future considerations
June 21, 2017	To Vegas Golden Knights Shea Theodore	To Anaheim Ducks future considerations
June 21, 2017	To Vegas Golden Knights David Clarkson; 1st-round pick in 2017; 2nd-round pick in 2019	To Columbus Blue Jackets future considerations
June 21, 2017	To Vegas Golden Knights Mikhail Grabovski; Jake Bischoff; 1st-round pick in 2017; 2nd-round pick in 2019	To New York Islanders future considerations
June 21, 2017	To Vegas Golden Knights Alex Tuch	To Minnesota Wild conditional 3rd-round pick in 2017 or 3rd-round pick in 2018 future considerations
June 21, 2017	To Vegas Golden Knights Nikita Gusev; 2nd-round pick in 2017; PIT's 4th-round pick in 2018	To Tampa Bay Lightning future considerations
June 21, 2017	To Vegas Golden Knights 1st-round pick in 2017; 3rd-round pick in 2019	To Winnipeg Jets CBJ's 1st-round pick in 2017 future considerations
June 21, 2017	To Vegas Golden Knights 2nd-round pick in 2020	To Pittsburgh Penguins future considerations
June 22, 2017	To Carolina Hurricanes Trevor van Riemsdyk; 7th-round pick in 2018	To Vegas Golden Knights PIT's 2nd-round pick in 2017
June 22, 2017	To New York Islanders Jordan Eberle	To Edmonton Oilers Ryan Strome
June 22, 2017	To Montreal Canadiens David Schlemko	To Vegas Golden Knights 5th-round pick in 2019

== Waivers ==
Once an NHL player has played in a certain number of games or a set number of seasons has passed since the signing of his first NHL contract (see here), that player must be offered to all of the other NHL teams before he can be assigned to a minor league affiliate.

Date	Player	New team	Previous team	Ref
October 9, 2016	Martin Frk	Carolina Hurricanes	Detroit Red Wings	
October 11, 2016	Mike Condon	Pittsburgh Penguins	Montreal Canadiens	
October 11, 2016	Seth Griffith	Toronto Maple Leafs	Boston Bruins	
October 11, 2016	Klas Dahlbeck	Carolina Hurricanes	Arizona Coyotes	
October 11, 2016	Teemu Pulkkinen	Minnesota Wild	Detroit Red Wings	
October 11, 2016	P.A. Parenteau	New Jersey Devils	New York Islanders	
October 13, 2016	Emerson Etem	Anaheim Ducks	Vancouver Canucks	
October 24, 2016	Ben Smith	Toronto Maple Leafs	Colorado Avalanche	
November 1, 2016	Martin Frk	Detroit Red Wings	Carolina Hurricanes	
November 12, 2016	Seth Griffith	Florida Panthers	Toronto Maple Leafs	
November 21, 2016	Matt Puempel	New York Rangers	Ottawa Senators	
December 3, 2016	Reid Boucher	Nashville Predators	New Jersey Devils	
December 11, 2016	Josh Jooris	Arizona Coyotes	New York Rangers	
January 2, 2017	Alexander Burmistrov	Arizona Coyotes	Winnipeg Jets	
January 2, 2017	Reid Boucher	New Jersey Devils	Nashville Predators	
January 4, 2017	Ty Rattie	Carolina Hurricanes	St. Louis Blues	
January 4, 2017	Reid Boucher	Vancouver Canucks	New Jersey Devils	
January 5, 2017	Matt Nieto	Colorado Avalanche	San Jose Sharks	
January 10, 2017	Curtis McElhinney	Toronto Maple Leafs	Columbus Blue Jackets	
January 11, 2017	Derek Grant	Nashville Predators	Buffalo Sabres	
January 17, 2017	Brad Hunt	Nashville Predators	St. Louis Blues	
January 20, 2017	Seth Griffith	Toronto Maple Leafs	Florida Panthers	
January 25, 2017	Stefan Noesen	New Jersey Devils	Anaheim Ducks	
February 2, 2017	Mark Barberio	Colorado Avalanche	Montreal Canadiens	
February 4, 2017	Alexey Marchenko	Toronto Maple Leafs	Detroit Red Wings	
February 6, 2017	Derek Grant	Buffalo Sabres	Nashville Predators	
February 19, 2017	Ty Rattie	St. Louis Blues	Carolina Hurricanes	
February 27, 2017	Zac Dalpe	Columbus Blue Jackets	Minnesota Wild	
February 27, 2017	Greg McKegg	Tampa Bay Lightning	Florida Panthers	
March 1, 2017	Joseph Cramarossa	Vancouver Canucks	Anaheim Ducks	

== Expansion draft ==
The 2016–17 NHL season saw the entrance of a 31st team to the league, the Vegas Golden Knights. While the team does not begin play until the 2017–18 NHL season, the team was active and able to make trades with the other 30 teams and sign free agents starting March 1, 2017. In order to create a roster, an Expansion Draft was held June 21, 2017.

Vegas was required to select one player from each of the existing teams, for a total of 30 players selected. At least 20 of the players selected had to be on contracted for the 2017–18 NHL season and Vegas had to take a minimum of number of player at each position. Each of the thirty other teams were allowed to protect up to 11 players, but also had to expose a minimum number of players with NHL experience for Vegas to select at each position. Teams were required to protect players with No-Movement Clauses (or the player must waive it); all first- and second-year professionals, as well as all unsigned draft choices, and players determined to have career threatening injuries were exempt from selection and were not counted toward their teams' protection limits.

On June 17, 2017, a waiver and trade freeze, as well as moratorium on signing players to new contracts went into effect for all teams except for Vegas, and each team had to submit their expansion protection lists. Vegas had from June 18–21 to negotiate with all exposed free agents; if Vegas came to terms with a player in this time, that player counted as their previous team's expansion selection and Vegas was not able to select another player from that team. On June 21, 2017, Vegas' final roster was submitted, and was announced as part of the NHL Awards Ceremony that evening. Any players picked by Vegas cannot be traded back to their former team before January 1, 2018, nor can they have their contracts bought out by Vegas until after the completion of the 2017–18 season.

== See also ==
- 2016 NHL entry draft
- 2017 NHL entry draft
- 2016 in sports
- 2017 in sports
- 2015–16 NHL transactions
- 2017–18 NHL transactions
- 2017 NHL expansion draft
