= The Wrath of Grapes =

The Wrath of Grapes may refer to:

- The Wrath of Grapes, the British title for Leonard Wibberley's novel The Mouse That Roared
- The Wrath of Grapes: The Don Cherry Story II, a TV miniseries
