= I Kill the Bear =

- Created by: Jared Keeso
- Showrunner: Jared Keeso
- Written by: Jared Keeso
- Directed by: Dan Skene; Sean Skene
- Country of origin: Canada
- Original languages: English; French

Original release
- Network: Crave
- Release: November 6, 2026

I Kill the Bear is a Canadian television sitcom created and written by Jared Keeso and directed by Dan Skene and Sean Skene.

== Cast and characters ==
- Sarah-Maude Beauchesne as Andrée Thibault
- Jared Keeso as Gabby Thibault
- Georges St-Pierre as Olivier Thibault
- Jonathan Torrens as Cedric Thibault
- Dylan Playfair as Timothy
- Eliana Jones as Rose
- Scott Thompson as Edward
- Kristin Kreuk as Kathy
- Frederick Roy as Alex
- Megha Sandhu as Ricky
- Adrian Holmes as Bob
- Chad Kroeger as The Son of Grizzly Adams
- Ryan McDonell as Milloux
- Kim Cloutier as Lucy

It premiered via Crave on November 6, 2026.

== Overview ==
One family's century-long tradition of training movie bears comes to an end as changing views on animal performers reshape their future.
