= Keilani Elizabeth Rose =

Canadian actress

- Born: Keilani Elizabeth Rose; 1991 or 1992 (age 33–34); Lheidli (also known as Prince George, British Columbia, Canada)
- Other name: Keilani Jung
- Occupations: Actress, filmmaker, dancer
- Years active: 2016–present
- Known for: Shoresy; Within the Silence
- Website: keilanielizabethrose.com

Keilani Elizabeth Rose is a Canadian actress, filmmaker, dancer, and DJ. She is best known for her role as Miigwan in the hockey comedy series Shoresy. Rose made her film and choreography debut in Within the Silence (2021), for which she received an award for Best Choreography at the World Film Festival in Cannes.

== Early life ==
Rose was born and raised in Lheidli, the traditional territory of the Lheidli T'enneh First Nation, Prince George, British Columbia. Through her matrilineal lineage, she belongs to the Lheidli T'enneh nation and has intersectional Indigenous heritage with the Kanaka Maoli (Native Hawaiian) diaspora. She also carries British, Chinese, and Black ancestry. Rose is a direct descendant of Granny Seymour, known as The Matriarch of the North, and the great-granddaughter of Captain Owen Forrester Browne. Her mother was a hula dancer, which inspired her to pursue dance as an initial career with training in both traditional cultural dances and classical dance. She received the Governor General's Award for academic excellence and attended the University of Northern British Columbia.

== Career ==
Rose began her career as a dancer, performing with Disney Cruise Line and appearing in productions for Disney and ABC. She later transitioned to acting, appearing in television series including Lucifer, Once Upon a Time, Six, and A Series of Unfortunate Events. In 2020, Rose played Katie Hamilton in the thriller film The Sinners (also known as The Color Rose). In 2021, she starred in and choreographed the short film Within the Silence, which won Best Choreography for Rose at the World Film Festival in Cannes. In 2023, she won Best Actress (Short Film) at the Cine Paris Film Festival for the short film Breathe.

Rose has portrayed Miigwan (nicknamed "Miig") in the Crave/Hulu comedy series Shoresy, a spinoff of Letterkenny, since 2022. Her character serves as an assistant manager for the Sudbury Bulldogs hockey team. The show was noted for its contemporary representation of Indigenous characters. Rose worked with the production team to include Indigenous elements, including beadwork by Toronto artist Jori Brennon and displaying the Lheidli T'enneh nation's logo with permission from the band council. In Season 4, she choreographed a dance scene for the series.

Rose is also the founder and executive director of Two Rivers & a Rose Filmworks, a production company dedicated to amplifying messages of equity and diversity.

== Personal life ==
On July 4, 2022, Rose was shot in the chest outside her apartment in Hollywood, Los Angeles. After surgery and recovery, she returned to work on Shoresy in 2023. Rose advocates for Indigenous water rights and serves as president of the Northern Indigenous Arts Council.

== Filmography ==
=== Film ===
Year	Title	Role	Notes
2018	Woodland	Rene	
2020	All Joking Aside	Girl at Bus Stop	Uncredited
2020	The Sinners	Katie Hamilton	Also known as The Color Rose
2020	Within the Silence	Pixie	Short film
2021	Broken Diamonds	Party Onlooker	As Keilani Jung
2023	Been Better, Actually.	Anela	Short film
2024	Breathe		Short film; also producer
2024	BC Buds	Ava	Short film
TBA	Ex-Hale	Linda Sparks	Short film; completed

=== Television ===
Year	Title	Role	Notes
2016–2017	Once Upon a Time	Pirate Dancer / Dancer	2 episodes
2017	Lucifer	Frisky Woman #1	Episode: "Off the Record"; Credited as Keilani Jung
2018	Six	Babe #1	Episode: "Dua"; Credited as Keilani Jung
2018	A Series of Unfortunate Events	Dancer	Episode: "The Carnivorous Carnival: Part One"; Uncredited
2020	Flimsy	Cadence	Web series, 12 episodes; also director (3 episodes) and executive producer
2022	Two Sentence Horror Stories	Kala	Episode: "Erased"
2022–present	Shoresy	Miigwan	16 episodes
2022–present	SkyMed	Tyra	1 episode

=== Choreography ===
Year	Title	Notes
2021	Within the Silence	Short film
2024	Shoresy	Season 4 dance scene

=== Awards and nominations ===
Year	Award	Category	Work	Result
2021	World Film Festival in Cannes	Best Choreography	Within the Silence	Won
2023	Cine Paris Film Festival	Best Actress, Short Film	Breathe	Won
