= Shoresy =

Canadian comedy television series

- Genre: Sitcom
- Created by: Jared Keeso
- Written by: Jared Keeso
- Directed by: Jacob Tierney; Sean Skene; Dan Skene
- Starring: Jared Keeso; Tasya Teles; Blair Lamora; Keilani Elizabeth Rose; Ryan McDonell; Camille Sullivan; Jonathan-Ismaël Diaby; Terry Ryan; Harlan Blayne Kytwayhat
- Country of origin: Canada
- Original languages: English; French
- No. of seasons: 5
- No. of episodes: 30

Production
- Executive producers: Jared Keeso; Jacob Tierney; Mark Montefiore; Kara Haflidson; Sean Skene; Dan Skene
- Producers: Brendan Brady; Tiio Horn
- Production locations: Sudbury, Ontario, Canada
- Camera setup: Single-camera
- Running time: 19–33 minutes
- Production companies: New Metric Media; Bell Media; WildBrain Studios; Play Fun Games Pictures

Original release
- Network: Crave
- Release: May 13, 2022 – present

Related
- Letterkenny

Shoresy is a Canadian television comedy series created by and starring Jared Keeso that premiered on Crave on May 13, 2022. A spin-off of Letterkenny, the series focuses on the titular character of Shoresy (Keeso) as he moves to Sudbury, Ontario, to take a job with a struggling Senior AAA-level ice hockey team, the Sudbury Bulldogs.

In the United States, the series premiered on Hulu on May 27, 2022. A second season was announced in January 2023, which premiered on September 29, 2023. In October 2023, the series was renewed for a third season, which premiered on May 24, 2024. The fourth season premiered on January 24, 2025, already having been renewed for a fifth season. The fifth season premiered on December 25, 2025, with season six renewed the following month.

== Premise ==
After losing twenty straight games and running dead last in the four team Triple A-level Northern Ontario Senior Hockey Organization (NOSHO), the Sudbury Bulldogs are faced with being completely shut down. In an attempt to save the team, veteran player Shore ("Shoresy") makes a bet with team general manager Nat that the team will never lose again if he is given a chance to take control. With the help of new coach Sanguinet, a roster of new players, and the dissolution of the team on the line, Shoresy sets out to prove that the Bulldogs can play as a team, sell tickets to games, and make a name for themselves. He rebuilds the team with veteran players who share his philosophy that it is not enough to "love to win", they have to "hate to lose".

== Cast ==
=== Main ===
- Jared Keeso as Shoresy, a centre hockey player recruited to the Sudbury Bulldogs from Letterkenny, who later becomes the team's coach
- Tasya Teles as Nat, the owner and general manager of the Sudbury Bulldogs
- Harlan Blayne Kytwayhat as Sanguinet (seasons 1–3), a former hockey player and the team's assistant coach, later promoted to head coach
- Blair Lamora as Ziigwan (AKA Ziig), the assistant general manager of the team
- Keilani Elizabeth Rose as Miigwan (AKA Miig), Ziig's sister and fellow assistant general manager
- Ryan McDonell as Mark Michaels, a goaltender who serves as the Bulldogs' coach when Shoresy arrives

=== Recurring ===
- Maclean Fish as Jory Jordan, a precocious young reporter who works for the Sudbury Kids Sports Report
- Jacob Smith as Fish (seasons 1–3), a right wing player for the Bulldogs
- Camille Sullivan as Laura Mohr, a sports journalist and Shoresy's love interest
- Max Bouffard as Jean-Jacques François Jacques-Jean "JJ Frankie JJ" (seasons 1–3), a right wing player for the Bulldogs
- Andrew Antsanen as Brant "Goody" Goodleaf, a left wing player for the Bulldogs
- Jonathan-Ismaël Diaby as himself (AKA Dolo), a defenseman for the Bulldogs who only communicates in French
- Terry Ryan as Ted "Hitch" Hitchcock, a defenseman for the Bulldogs
- Laurence Leboeuf as herself (seasons 1–3), JJ Frankie JJ's on-and-off love interest
- Jon Mirasty as Jim Seesequasis, a centre for the Bulldogs
- Brandon Nolan as Jim Pine, a right wing player for the Bulldogs
- Jordan Nolan as Jim Pine (no relation), a left wing player for the Bulldogs
- Eliana Jones as Mercedes Policetri, a nightlife influencer in Sudbury
- Keegan Long as Liam, a high school hockey player
- Bourke Cazabon as Cory, a high school hockey player
- Jon Ambrose as Phil, a Sudbury local

=== Guests ===
- Scott Thompson as Shoresy's foster father
- Jonathan Torrens as Rémy Nadeau, a Québécois play-by-play hockey commentator
- Jacob Tierney as Benoit "Benny" Brodeur, Nadeau's broadcast partner and color commentator
- Kim Cloutier as Anik Archambault, a television host who often works with Shoresy
- Tessa Bonhomme as herself
- Jay Onrait as himself
- Brian "Rear Admiral" McGonagall as himself
- Lysandre Nadeau as herself
- Rêve as herself
- Wayne Gretzky as himself
- Marie-Mai as herself
- Sean Avery as himself

== Production and development ==
Shoresy is played by Jared Keeso, but within Letterkenny he was only seen in contexts that obscured his face as Keeso simultaneously played the leading role of Wayne. Justin Stockman of Bell Media explained the decision to proceed with a Shoresy spin-off by noting that he is one of the most popular characters in Letterkenny merchandising, and acknowledging the creative potential involved in building on the story of a character about whom very little is known in the original show.

Production on the series launched in November 2021 in Sudbury. Production locations have included the Sudbury Community Arena.

During the tenth-season Letterkenny episode "VidVok", Tanis explains to Wayne that she managed to get Shore a position on the Sudbury Bulldogs and will be moving soon, setting up the Shoresy series. The show's first teaser trailer was released in February 2022.

Like Letterkenny, the show has received praise for its efforts to include fully rounded and nuanced portrayals of its First Nations characters, which was accomplished in part by including actress Kaniehtiio Horn, who plays Tanis in the original Letterkenny, as a producer tasked in part with ensuring that the indigenous characters were written and portrayed realistically. The series has also received positive notice for inverting the stereotypical gender dynamics in hockey by placing women in power positions as the team's manager, her two assistants and the sports journalist who covers the team for The Sudbury Star, noting that in Letterkenny "Part of the secret ... is that although the men seem to be the focal point of the story and the women seem to be objectified in endless slo-mo walk-ups, the men are all trapped in different stages of arrested development and the women are truly in charge."

While more suburban and rural parts of Sudbury serve as a backdrop for the fictional town of Letterkenny in the series, the central urban core of the city is fully represented as itself in Shoresy. The city is featured prominently in the new series and "the dialogue is rife with quippy mentions of Sudbury landmarks". The various hockey scenes take place at the Sudbury Community Arena, complete with advertising for local businesses on the boards and the Sudbury Wolves logo can be seen in several background shots. The series also features numerous real-life downtown Sudbury food and entertainment venues, including the Coulson nightclub, Peppi Panini and the Laughing Buddha.

The show has also partnered with the real-life Sudbury Wolves on charitable fundraising initiatives, including special limited-edition Sudbury Bulldogs jerseys that would be worn by the Wolves players in an OHL game before being auctioned off to raise funds. The cast also regularly plays a series of hockey games against NHL alumni, in character as the Bulldogs, under the Shoresy Classic banner.

In June 2024, The Globe and Mail reported that season 4 was set to begin filming.

In December 2024, New Metric and Treewood Games announced that a Shoresy video game was in development. Shoresy: Legends of the North was released for Steam on November 22, 2025.

== Episodes ==
Season	Episodes	Originally released	
Season	Episodes	First released	Last released
1	6	May 13, 2022	May 27, 2022
2	6	September 29, 2023	October 27, 2023
3	6	May 24, 2024	June 21, 2024
4	6	January 24, 2025	February 21, 2025
5	6	December 25, 2025	January 22, 2026

=== Season 1 (2022) ===
No. overall	No. in season	Title	Directed by	Written by	Original release date
1	1	"Never Lose Again"	Jacob Tierney	Jared Keeso	May 13, 2022
The Sudbury Bulldogs, a hockey team in the North Ontario Senior Hockey Organisation (NOSHO) lose a game, despite having Shoresy, a player analysed on TV as the dirtiest player in hockey. Shoresy insults the teams coach Michaels after the loss. Nat the owner of the team fires Michaels and talks to Shoresy and fellow player Sanguinet about folding the team. Shoresy promises to never lose again, while Sanguinet will coach. Nat agrees, but warns them she will fold the team if they lose. Shoresy agrees and promises to find new players. Later he meets with local journalist Laura Mohr, flirting with her unsuccessfully.
2	2	"Veteran Presence"	Jacob Tierney	Jared Keeso	May 13, 2022
Shoresy provides Nat with four players he knows that will help the team. Dolo, a Quebecois player turned rapper, whose professional career ended when he fought a racist fan in the stands. Brant "Goody" Goodleaf, a Six Nations player who was drafted into the professional Lacrosse leagues. Ted "Hitch" Hitchcock, a former 1st round NHL draft pick from Newfoundland, and Jean-Jacques François Jacques Jean (JJ Franky JJ), a Quebecois player who Shoresy had injured with a dirty hit during a game previously. Nat is disappointed that she spent money on players who have not played in years or do not play hockey at all, but Shoresy reassures her that they are both good and the best available. Nat then sends Shoresy, Sanguinet and the new players to the local jail to pick up their enforcers. Three Indigenous prison guards all named Jim. Shoresy again meets with Laura, who despite reporting on the local junior game he referees, refuses to go to Bulldog games until they start being relevant. Nat manages to get the Bulldogs sponsorship with the local Blueberry Festival, changing the name of the team to the Sudbury Blueberry Bulldogs to the teams distaste. Shoresy and the new recruits attend a local bar, getting in a fight, impressing Nat.
3	3	"Know Your Role"	Jacob Tierney	Jared Keeso	May 20, 2022
Sanguinet nervous before his first game coaching, enlists Shoresy's help. Shoresy begrudgingly accepts, but only for one match. Shoresy gives the pregame speech and reads out the line up, with Dolo, Hitch, JJ and Goody all starting. He insults other players on the team, before they go out to play the Timmins Timber Kings, a team largely made up of dutch farmers, including many Apeldoorn brothers. Shoresy cries during the national anthem, before Dolo starts a fight after the puck drop. The Bulldogs win the match, thanks to the Jim's fighting and a JJ goal, seemingly inspired by his girlfriend, Quebecois actress Laurence Leboeuf arriving to watch. The team share ice cream cones after the match, although Shoresy's insults cause two of the players to give Nat an ultimatum, either Shoresy leaves or they do. One, Fish backs down, while the other quits. Nat happy at the win, although disappointed at the performance of their goaltender, visits Michaels who has sold most of his belongings after spending his money on his ex-girlfriend who had cheated on him with Sanguinet. She invites him to come back to the team as a goaltender, although he only accepts if Shoresy and Sanguinet apologise. Meanwhile, the video of Dolo's fight goes viral within Sudbury.
4	4	"If You Can't Win, Don't Play"	Jacob Tierney	Jared Keeso	May 20, 2022
Shoresey attends his family reunion, meeting his foster family, who reveal that Shoresy was overweight as a child and got his competitiveness from his brother. His foster father playfully insults his foster children, who take it lovingly. JJ, Goody, Hitch and Dolo get in a fight at the local bar with the men they had fought previously, and while Shoresy himself arrives late to the Bulldogs game against the North Bay Norsemen, the others have yet to arrive at all. Nat berates him over their absence and his lateness, before Michaels arrives. Nat orders Shoresy to apologise to him, which he does under protest, before they realise that with the star players still absent, they cannot win and so should not play. Two Quebecois commentators who have arrived to report on the game due to JJ commentate as Shoresy starts a fight with the entire Norseman team during the pre-game warm up, leading to the Jims skating out to help.
5	5	"Hockey Brings People Together"	Jacob Tierney	Jared Keeso	May 27, 2022
A wild brawl in the walkways of the arena occurs between the Bulldogs and the Norseman, with JJ, Goody, Hitch and Dolo arriving midfight. After the fight, the team shares ice cream again, and Shoresy even compliments Fish. Micheals using his connections to Sudbury's criminal world through his ex-girlfriend, gets her brothers to intimidate the men who had been fighting with the team. Later the same men dressed in humiliating costumes escort the team to their next game against the Soo Cyclones. Nat and her two assistants Miigwan and Ziigwan visit the NOSHO tribunal to attempt to get the cancelled game awarded to them, as technically the Norseman started the fight. After back and forth, they award them the win, although warn Nat to control her players. Needing to win both of their final two games against the Soo, they find that the Soo have rested their main players, leading to the Jims starting and physically overpowering the Soo. The Bulldogs win the game easily.
6	6	"Don't Poke the Bear"	Jacob Tierney	Jared Keeso	May 27, 2022
Laurence Leboeuf discovers JJ sleeping with Quebecois influencer Lysandre Nadeue, leading to her angrily leaving. Shoresy is made captain of the Bulldogs for their final game against the Soo, which causes him to cry, although JJ does not show up to the game, leading Fish to take his spot. The team is losing badly and during a period intermission, Shoresy tells the team not to focus on the score and instead be physical, leading to the Jims and the rest of the team playing for fun. The Bulldogs lose, but the stands are full and excited to see the Bulldogs play. Nat reminds Shoresy of their deal to fold the team, if they lost. But they both agree that they have made the team stronger on and off the ice, promising to do what they need to do to beat the Soo in the playoffs.

=== Season 2 (2023) ===
No. overall	No. in season	Title	Directed by	Written by	Original release date
7	1	"Get'em Focused"	Jacob Tierney	Jared Keeso	September 29, 2023
The Bulldogs win the NOSHO and go into the following season with the goal of setting a league record to go undefeated. They have won the last 20 games, and only have four to go to complete the record. Shoresy's constant pressure on the team to continue their winning streak begins to weigh thin on the team. The Bulldogs go into a game against the Timberkings and despite winning in a physical contest, Shoresy is furious that they only scored two goals. Slapping ice cream cones out of the hands of the majority of the team. After the game, the Bulldogs go to a local bar, where Nat, Miigwan and Ziigwan comment on the team beginning to lose focus, especially when they have a game against a new American team coming up.
8	2	"Skill vs Will"	Jacob Tierney	Jared Keeso	September 29, 2023
Shoresy is interviewed by Laura, flirting with her, although she continues to rebuff his advances. The Bulldogs begin to train for their upcoming game against the Hunt, an American team new to the league, although Shoresy is shocked when Nat tells him that a calendar with just JJ is in demand for the local Bear community. Despite requests from Nat for the team to focus on the Hunt game, Dolo, Goody and JJ continue to be distracted by their relationships, although Shoresy attempts to get them to focus.
9	3	"Set the Tone"	Jacob Tierney	Jared Keeso	October 6, 2023
The Bulldogs prepare to face the Hunt, with Ziigwan telling Shoresy, Nat and Miigwan that the star player for the Hunt will likely be under his best, as she saw him doing cocaine at a local strip club until the early morning. During the game, the Bulldogs are also playing below their best, losing fights and The Jims have stopped focusing on the game. Going into the final period, the team is losing, so Sanguinet gives the team a speech. Before telling Fish who has not scored a goal in the last few games, if he does not score, he is cut from the team. Fish scores and the Bulldogs win, although he tells Sanguinet and Shoresy never to threaten him like that again. After the win, Nat make Shoresy sit for an interview with local kids sports reporter Jory Jordan who insults him with quick fire questions, before Shoresy storms off. Nat, Miigwan and Ziigwan chastise Shoresy for the state of the team and his own behaviour, telling him to get it under control.
10	4	"Players Only"	Jacob Tierney	Jared Keeso	October 13, 2023
Sanguinet orders a players only meeting, where he calls out the players one by one for losing focus and not doing their best on the ice. The Jims reveal that they have been preoccupied with losing in a prison quiz tournament, after their fourth team member got stabbed. The team go for drinks and Hitch and Micheals argue about who should take the fourth member's place on the quiz team. Shoresy visits Laura, although after he professes his intentions to date her, she shuts the door on him, telling him that she does not believe his intentions are true. JJ who has been dating and cheating on multiple Quebecois actresses and influencers is called out on it by them on a TV show, where they question if he is still the pride of Quebec. Micheals having beat Hitch in a mock quiz, joins the Jims for the prison quiz tournament, helping the Jims win by setting the tone, just as they need to set the tone for the team. During the Bulldogs next game against the Norseman, one of their opponents insults JJ, leading to a brawl.
11	5	"The Man Advantage"	Jacob Tierney	Jared Keeso	October 20, 2023
The Bulldogs win their game against the Norseman, with Michaels singled out for praise due to his play keeping them undefeated. Shoresy however is called to the NOSHO tribunal for his behaviour during their last game. After originally being suspended, Nat and Shoresy manage to convince the tribunal to overturn their decision, freeing him to play. A gay night at a local bar is organised, with JJ to be the star attraction, although he has not left his room since being called out by his ex-girlfriends. After Shoresy is threatened by local mob to ensure that JJ attends the event, the Bulldogs attempt to get Frankie to attend. Although he only goes after he reunites with Laurence Labeouf. Shoresy attempts again to win over Laura, and while she originally rebuffs him, she later dances with him at the event.
12	6	"Accountability"	Jacob Tierney	Jared Keeso	October 27, 2023
The Bulldogs have an away game against the Hunt in America, with Shoresy forgoing going home with Laura to stay focused. He orders Goody, Hitch, Dolo and JJ to also abstain from sex to also focus on the team. In order to have the National Senior Tournament in Sudbury, Nat organised for a calendar of the team that has raised almost enough, although they still require $10,000 more, leading to questions about how they will raise the remaining funds. Shoresy goes against his own team order and sleeps with Laura. The Bulldogs go to America to play the Hunt, the pregame introductions are photos from the calendar, while the Canadian national anthem is poorly played by a child on a recorder, infuriating Shoresy. The Jims take out the Hunt's best players early in the game and the Bulldogs win. Additionally, because so many Hunt fans bought the calendars after seeing the photos during the introductions, the National Senior Tournament will be held in Sudbury.

=== Season 3 (2024) ===
No. overall	No. in season	Title	Directed by	Written by	Original release date
13	1	"4-6"	Sean Skene	Jared Keeso	May 24, 2024
The Bulldogs lose the NOSHO championship to the Soo Hunt, despite Shoresy playing through a concussion. The National Senior Tournament is hosted by Sudbury, with teams from Prince Edward Island, Alberta, Quebec, and Southern Ontario arriving in town, with the Hunt and Bulldogs also taking part. The Bulldogs get into a bar fight with the Hunt.
14	2	"Charlottetown Reds"	Sean Skene	Jared Keeso	May 24, 2024
The Bulldogs prepare for their first game of the National Senior Tournament against the Charlottetown Reds, a team from Prince Edward Island captained by "Gorgeous" Gord Gallant. Laura interviews Gord before the game who asks her out, although she declines. Despite JJ arriving late, the Bulldogs win, with Shoresy playing poorly. The Bulldogs host a seminar on nutrition for the local youth.
15	3	"Vaughan Canadesi"	Sean Skene	Jared Keeso	May 31, 2024
On the back of the seminar on nutrition, the Bulldogs prepare for their game against Southern Ontario team Vaughan Canadesi, a team made up largely of Italian-Canadians, by eating healthier. The Canadesi are led by Sly Sylvestri, a dirty player who injures one of the Bulldogs. The Jims get physical with the opposition, leading to a fight. The Bulldogs win the game, although JJ is missing in action as he is trying to win back his ex-fiance Marie-Mai, the owner of the Quebec team who does not want him back. While Sly injures Shoresy with a slash to the ankle.
16	4	"Brooks Barrelmen"	Dan Skene	Jared Keeso	June 7, 2024
Five weeks earlier, the Bulldogs celebrate their NOSHO record season, with Shoresy using cocaine and becoming argumentative, before being given MDMA to calm him down. The Bulldogs partially shave their heads, believing it will cool them down. They end up in a pool and at the rink. In the present day, the Bulldogs are preparing for their game against the Brooks Barrelmen, a team from Alberta. While they have lost their first two games, they have two feared enforcers who play physically in the 1st period. Shoresy asks Sanguinet to put the Jims into the game, but he refuses until they have a lead. The two continue to argue, and even after taking a 2-0 lead, Sanguinet refuses to put the Jims in, leading Shoresy to take the ice. Hitch tries to get Sanguinet to pull Shoresy from the game due his injury risk, but refuses due to his anger at Shoresy. Shoresy then takes a major hit that knocks him out.
17	5	"SOO Hunt"	Dan Skene	Jared Keeso	June 14, 2024
Shoresy suffers his second concussion in short succession, leading Nat to rule Shoresy out of the semi-finals, and telling him to look at retirement. He tries to argue with her, but she says that she has the team to look out for. JJ goes on Quebecois TV, where his ex-girlfriends share their dirty laundry about him to his face. Shoresy meets with his family, who console him about missing the semi-final against the Soo Hunt. After the Bulldogs go 3-0 down, Nat texts Shoresy asking him to find a way to contribute, which he does by starting a fight with Hunt fans in the stands.
18	6	"Les Rapides De Rawdon"	Dan Skene	Jared Keeso	June 21, 2024
Gord, Marie-Mai, Sly, Nat and players from the Barrelmen and Hunt meet to discuss if Shoresy should be suspended for the final against Les Rapides De Rawdon, the Quebec team due to his fight in the stands during the Hunt game. Nat reveals that it will be Shoresy's final game and successfully argues for him to play. Laura interviews Shoresy before his final game, the two flirting with each other. The Bulldogs begin the game losing 4-0, Shoresy gives a speech to the team, which inspires them to win 5-4. The teams all share dinner together after the tournament, eating seafood brought from Prince Edward Island by Gord. Laura and Shoresy later have dinner, where he reveals that he has been offered a job as a hockey analyst on BroDude. Nat wants him to stay and be a coach instead.

=== Season 4 (2025) ===
No. overall	No. in season	Title	Directed by	Written by	Original release date
19	1	"Summer In Sudvegas"	Dan Skene	Jared Keeso	January 24, 2025
While most of the team have left Sudbury for the summer, Shoresy, Dolo, Hitch, Goody, Michaels continue to celebrate their National title. Nat wants them to settle down and begin to focus on hockey again. The group promise to take it easy if she gets them invited to Weird Sudbury, a party that is good and weird. Shoresy is trying to adapt to life after hockey, and becomes a co-host of a webshow for BroDude, where he and Anik Archambault discuss hockey with a rotating third host. After discovering that Shoresy respects both Doug Gilmour and Marty McSorley too much to be himself, the producers bring on Sean Avery, leading to the desired result. Shoresy still feels empty about his role on the webshow, but refuses Nat's request to coach the Bulldogs. He then attempts to win over Laura Mohr, who tells him to work out if he is actually sure about settling down with her first.
20	2	"Blueberry Buddies"	Sean Skene	Jared Keeso	January 24, 2025
In exchange for invitations to Weird Sudbury, the Bulldogs agree to mentor four players from junior hockey who will be leaving to play in the Ontario Hockey League: Caleb, Carter, Jack and Mason. After discovering that there had been a complaint of a sexual nature against one of the boys from their regular coach, Shoresy and the Bulldogs discover that it was simply one of them showing his penis in the locker room to get out of training. They react angrily to learning that the boys are unable to undress in the locker room itself in order to not make anyone uncomfortable. Shoresy continues his hosting duties on the webshow, but is uncomfortable when asked to discuss women's hockey with Tessa Bonhomme, Kenzie Lalonde and Meghan Chayka, as he does not believe he has the experience to discuss it. Insulting Bonhomme when after a discussion about Olympic rink sizes, says that while her win at the 2010 Olympics was one of the greatest moments of his life, the men's win at the same Olympics was the greatest. Shoresy in his ongoing attempt to win over Laura sings Alanis Morissette at a karaoke night, with Nat and the Bulldogs cheering him on after they discover it.
21	3	"The Itch"	Dan Skene	Jared Keeso	January 31, 2025
The Bulldogs discuss what toxic masculinity is with the junior players after they got in trouble for wearing a shirt making fun of a teammate who claimed mental health concerns to get out of a team skate. Dolo, Goody and Hitch have been sleeping with the mothers of the players, and The Jims, upset at being left out of some of the cup celebrations, tell the Bulldogs casual partners this. Shoresy takes Jory Jordan to BroDude, after he ambushes him with questions. Needing a third host, Jory jumps at the opportunity. Although he spends the segment sexistly insulting Anik, who attempts to do a segment on hockey players clothes. Shoresy frustrated at the show goes to Nat for advice, who again tells him to coach. He refuses and goes to Laura's where she rebuffs his attempts, but invites him in to fix his eyebrow that he had tried to cut himself.
22	4	"Good and Weird"	Sean Skene	Jared Keeso	February 7, 2025
The Bulldogs attempt a radio ad for the local blueberry festival. After many failed attempts, Nat reminds them that the blueberry festival is the financial reason the team has got where they are, and they deliver a perfect recital in return. In response to The Jims telling their casual partners about them sleeping with the junior players' mothers. Dolo, Hitch and Goody bring The Jims to a kangaroo court, with Micheals presiding and Shoresy defending The Jims. The Jims say that they did it because they felt they were "big timed" by the rest of the team and left out. As punishment, they are told to tell the casual partners that they had lied, which they accept. Shoresy continues to try and win over Laura, doing her gardening and cleaning her windows while she is at work. The Bulldogs minus Michaels are invited to a pre-party for Weird Sudbury, due to their connection being an ex of Michaels. While on the way to the party, Shoresy pulls out, going to keep Michaels company.
23	5	"Reset the Tone"	Dan Skene	Jared Keeso	February 14, 2025
Another kangaroo court is called, after The Jims sleep with Dolo, Hitch and Goody's casual partners, after they met with them to tell them they had lied previously. The team put aside their differences, realising that they have grown apart and have a skate session together. Shoresy, still torn about what to do post hockey, is told by Nat that after her mother passed, she was told to put her love into something else, choosing the hockey team. His attempts to win over Laura continue, with her telling him, he has to be sure. After he rejects an advance from Mason's mom, Jill, Shoresy returns to Laura, telling her that he will earn her respect. Jack is infatuated with a woman named Maria, and the Bulldogs decided to help him win her over, by telling him to do something she enjoys like singing or dancing. They settle on karaoke against his protests, telling him that embarrassing himself is part of it. With the Bulldogs support, he sings for Maria, leading to her noticing him, but she slips away after.
24	6	"Go Where You're Needed"	Sean Skene	Jared Keeso	February 21, 2025
Jack and Mason drive to Laura's house and read a message from Shoresy professing his love for her; he soon arrives having run a marathon, because she had previously told him to but forgot, which his message then alludes to. After realizing that they are both sure about each other, she invites him in. Buoyed by Shoresy's success, Jack decides to dance for Maria at the Blueberry festival dance. The Bulldogs help him learn the dance and decide to perform it with him. Nat informs the Bulldogs that they have been invited to Weird Sudbury, but it is the same night of the dance. Shoresy attempts to get Dolo, Hitch and Goody to miss the party with an inspirational speech, but while they think he should coach, they will not miss Weird Sudbury. The Bulldogs then take the junior players for their final practice session, Shoresy giving them a rousing speech, which fires them up before they tell him he should coach. Shoresy eventually decides to tell Nat that he will take the coaching role. Dolo, Goody and Hitch realize on the way to Weird Sudbury that they should be at the dance and instead go there, leading to the Bulldogs and the junior players dancing, with Jack talking to Maria afterwards.

=== Season 5 (2025–26) ===
No. overall	No. in season	Title	Directed by	Written by	Original release date
25	1	"Keep It Simple"	Dan Skene	Jared Keeso	December 25, 2025
Shoresy, Dolo, Hitch and Goody get a lift from Jack's billet mother Jill to North Bay to watch Jack play Junior hockey. Jack who is homesick and has been playing poorly, has a superb game after Shoresy gives him advice. Shoresy almost starts a fight with the father of an opposing player, before apologizing and sharing a beer with him after the game. On the drive home, Jill propositions Shoresy, but he declines due to his relationship with Laura. Meanwhile, a European team is receiving national media coverage touring the US and Canada defeating NHL farm teams with physical play.
26	2	"The Great One"	Dan Skene	Jared Keeso	December 25, 2025
On his first day of coaching, Shoresy learns that the NOSHO has folded due to a lack of teams, with only the Soo Hunt and Bulldogs surviving. The Bulldogs are forced to empty their offices and locker room for the local basketball team. Shoresy travels to Toronto to appear on a new BroDude show with Anik. Wayne Gretzky is scheduled to appear, leading Shoresy to brag to his father and brother. Gretzky pulls out of the interview, although Shoresy defends him as having done enough for Canada throughout his life. During the show, Shoresy rants about the decline of physicality in hockey, arguing that the game in Canada is dying. Following the show, Shoresy receives a video call from Gretzky, where he apologizes for the sudden cancellation and praises his comments and the Bulldogs' play. After a night of partying to grieve the loss of the team, Shoresy and the Bulldogs wake up to coverage of the European team's head coach responding to Shoresy's comments.
27	3	"A Winning Culture"	Dan Skene	Jared Keeso	January 1, 2026
Shoresy and Laura have a date, where they discuss moving in together, as long as her child is comfortable with him. Nat, Miigwan, Ziigwan and Shoresy discuss forming a team made up of North American players, under the guise of the NOSHO Northstars to play against the European team. With the help of Ziig, Shoresy recruits star players from the National Senior Tournament alongside select players from the Bulldogs. Shoresy coaches and tries to create a winning culture, making sure that they all learn the names of people who work at the arena, before taking them to a local bar and strip club. At the bar, Delaney goes to the strip club instead of drinking with the team. Shoresy cuts him from the team, then tells him to start a fight with the basketball team that took the Bulldogs locker room if he wants to be on the team. A brawl ensues and Delaney is welcomed back. Shoresy calls in his brother Morris to be his assistant coach, becoming emotional when asked to talk about him during a joint interview with Jory. The Northstars then watch the European team beat an Edmonton team 11-0.
28	4	"Practice How You Play"	Sean Skene	Jared Keeso	January 8, 2026
The EU's coach Teppo Maki challenges Shoresy to test his side during an interview. Nat discovers that the only ice time the city will give them for both their warm up game against the Apeldoorn's and the game against the EU is at 6am or 10pm, due to their old times being given to the basketball team and a Avril Lavigne tribute act. Shoresy is heartbroken that the city has seemingly forgotten them so quickly. He tries to fight one of the basketball players at a bar, but eventually comes to an agreement to go to one of their games in exchange for their old changeroom for the games. The Apeldoorn game is rescheduled to 6am and Delaney arrives late with two strippers. The Apeldoorn goalie doesn't show, so Shoresy and Mo are forced to ask Teppo to lend the EU's goalie on the condition they do not hit him. The NOSHO team win 1-0. Although no one comes to watch, leading Shoresy to think they are forgotten. The Bulldogs later attend the basketball game, getting a standing ovation from the crowd, pleasing Shoresy and Nat, who has booked an outdoor rink for the EU game instead.
29	5	"Total Buy-In"	Sean Skene	Jared Keeso	January 15, 2026
The local church allows their outdoor rink to be used as long as there is no fighting during the game. Shoresy and Mo require total buy-in from the team and any issues they have should be out of their system before the game. Jill tries to organise a threesome with Laura and Shorey, Laura is supportive, but Shoresy is unsure, asking Nat for her advice, before eventually turning it down. Laura's son Ben stays with them, which Shoresy is pleased about. The team settle their issues, with Schnurr providing Delaney with as many lap dances as he wishes, to try and prevent him thinking about them during the game. Gord sleeps with Ziig, Jim #3 organises mediation between Goody, the other Jims and a woman they have been seeing separately, while Hitch helps clear the air for Michaels and Mercedes. For their roles in the mediation and clearing the air, Jim #3 and Schnurr are named Assistant Captains, while Hitch is named Captain for the game against the EU. During the pre-game line up the Northstars drop their gloves.
30	6	"Who Are We?"	Sean Skene	Jared Keeso	January 22, 2026
The North Stars and EU fight each other, until the police arrive and restrain them with zip ties. The church organisers are furious with Nat, after she promised there would be no fighting, but a police officer who Nat has previously slept with allows the game to recommence. Jory Jordan sexistly insults Anik who places him in a headlock. Shoresy has a flashback to Jack's coach asking him if he would prefer to lose honourably or win dishonourably, which he has no answer to. The EU go 2-0 up in a physical first period. Shoresy and Mo tell the team to kill more guys in the second, which they do, although they concede another goal. Going into the third period 3-0 down, Shoresy tells the team to make sure that the EU never forgets who they are, before going around the room asking each player who they are. The North Stars score three unanswered goals, before a dive from a EU player allows them to score the winning goal. Shoresy thanks Teppo for giving him the answer to Jack's coach's question. The two sides drink and chat together after the game. Nat gives the church a donation, while telling them that hockey players can do good off the ice. Meanwhile, Shoresy moves in with Laura.

== Critical response ==
In advance of the series premiere, John Doyle of The Globe and Mail praised the show, writing that "In the spirit of Letterkenny, the humour is funny, mad, droll, childish and spiky. Full of salty Canadian vernacular, it soars. There are more visual jokes than you might find in the average episode of Letterkenny, but the flavour is the familiar tone of boldly irreverent, and it is sometimes slashing satire with more puns than you can count. In an expected but delightful way, Shoresy is Letterkenny refreshed. Who knew that a series that opened some years ago with the line, 'A coupla hockey players came up the lane way the other day,' could eventually unleash this great spinoff?"

Daniel Fienberg of The Hollywood Reporter described the series as essentially an updated version of the 1977 film Slap Shot, praising it both for humanizing the character of Shoresy, and for placing women and First Nations characters in positions of strength. Michael Hollett of NEXT Magazine wrote that Shoresy is "a fast-paced show with a more linear narrative and explicit plot than Letterkenny", and praised it for lacking the stiffness and awkwardness that often plagues television series about hockey.
