= Shomi =

Canadian subscription video on demand service

- Company type: Joint venture
- Website type: Video on demand
- Available in: English, French
- Founded: August 2014
- Dissolved: November 30, 2016
- Headquarters: Toronto, Ontario, Canada
- Area served: Canada
- Owners: Rogers Communications; Shaw Communications
- Key people: David Asch (President/General Manager); Marni Shulman (Vice President, Head of Content and Programming); Ann Tebo (Senior Director, Head of Customer Experience and Insights); Rita Ferarri (Senior Director, Head Of Marketing and Communications); Dennis Kuzmar (Senior Director, Head of Technology); Keltie Neville (Senior Manager, Head of People and Culture); Mark Jarvie (Director, Head of Finance); Augusto Rosa (Director, Head of Video and Network Infrastructure)
- Registration: Required
- Launched: November 4, 2014
- Current status: Discontinued as of November 30, 2016

Shomi (pronounced "show me") was a Canadian subscription video on demand service jointly owned by Rogers Communications and Shaw Communications, in operation from 2014 to 2016 (prior to Rogers' acquisition of Shaw in 2023). The service was viewed as a Canadian-based competitor to Netflix, with a library of 1,200 films and 11,000 hours' worth of television programs available on launch. Shomi content could be accessed as an over-the-top service through the service's website and apps, or through the video-on-demand libraries of participating television providers. The service emphasized manually curated categories of content, in contrast to the algorithmic approach used by competing services.

As of its beta launch on November 4, 2014, the service was not available as a standalone product and could only be purchased by internet and television subscribers of Rogers and Shaw. After August 20, 2015, that restriction was removed, and the service was available standalone. It competed directly with other subscription-based over-the-top streaming services, such as Bell Media's Crave.

On September 26, 2016, Shomi announced the service would shut down on November 30, 2016.

== Distribution ==
Shomi was available via the video-on-demand library of subscribers' set-top boxes, and as an over-the-top service via its website, mobile apps, video game consoles, and other devices. The service was priced at $8.99 per month; for its beta phase, Shomi was only available to those who are customers of Rogers and Shaw's internet or cable television services. A Rogers representative stated that the venture was "evaluating various distribution models" and was in talks with other television providers. As of August 20, 2015, Shomi was available as a standalone service and was no longer exclusive to Rogers or Shaw customers. In October 2015, Shaw Direct added Shomi to the lineup.

== Content ==
At its initial launch, the service offered 340 television series (11,000 hours) and 1,200 movies. Rather than using computer algorithms for suggesting content that a viewer may be interested in based on past viewing habits, Shomi content was divided into manually curated categories.

In October 2014, the service announced a content deal with the American premium cable service Starz, which would see some of that channel's original series, including Power, Survivor's Remorse, Black Sails, The White Queen, Spartacus and Da Vinci's Demons, distributed through the service. The same month, Shomi announced Between, a new original drama produced in collaboration with Netflix and Rogers-owned network City. As per the co-production, the series was distributed internationally by Netflix, but was a timed exclusive to Shomi in Canada.

In 2015, the service announced its addition of Transparent, one of the first original series produced by Amazon's Prime Video service, which was not available in Canada at the time.

== Criticism ==
In February 2015, the Consumers' Association of Canada and the Public Interest Advocacy Centre filed a complaint with the Canadian Radio-television and Telecommunications Commission (CRTC) about Shomi and Bell Media's competing service CraveTV, arguing that their exclusivity primarily to those who are subscribers of their respective owners' television services was a form of tied selling that "[discriminates] against customers who wish to only view programming through an Internet service provider of their choice".

On March 12, 2015, the CRTC announced new proposed regulations for video on demand services, creating a new category for "hybrid online video-on-demand" services between unregulated digital services and licensed video on demand services offered by providers, which are not allowed to offer "exclusive" content, and are also subject to genre protection and Canadian content rules. These services would not be bound to the aforementioned rules, including the ability to offer "exclusive" content, and can be made accessible within a television provider's video on demand system, but they must be also offered over-the-top on a standalone basis without a television subscription. The CRTC did not explicitly state whether CraveTV or Shomi would be classified as a "hybrid" VOD service under its proposed regulations, which would have required them to offer their service on a standalone basis. Shomi announced in May 2015 that it would begin offering its service as a standalone product later in the year.

In June 2015, Eastlink and Telus also filed a complaint with the CRTC against Shomi, arguing that the exclusivity period to Rogers and Shaw subscribers gave the two companies an unfair advantage, as they do not operate in all areas of the country, and no other third-party provider had offered it. The complaint alleged that the partnership had purposely frustrated attempts by third-party providers to negotiate deals to offer Shomi through various means, including providing limited notice of its launch (in contrast to CraveTV, which provided more advance notice, giving time for providers to reach deals), and stalling attempts to negotiate carriage deals by refusing to send a full contract to Eastlink. The complaint concluded that the actions demonstrated Rogers and Shaw "had no intention of making Shomi available to independent [providers], and their customers, in a timely manner."

== Discontinuation ==
On September 26, 2016, Shomi announced it would shut down on November 30, 2016. David Asch, senior vice-president and general manager for Shomi, cited the changing climate of the online video marketplace in Canada and greater than anticipated challenges in operating as the reasons for the shut down. Melani Griffith, senior vice-president of content at Rogers, said that the number of subscriptions was not "big enough to be renewed for another season". This announcement came amid reports that Rogers and Shaw expect to incur a "loss on investment of approximately $100 million to $140 million in its third quarter".

Solutions Research Group conducted a study in June 2016 that indicated that 5.2 million Canadian households subscribe to Netflix. In the same study, Crave and Shomi together had fewer than 700,000 subscribers.

The discontinuation was criticized by CRTC Chairman Jean-Pierre Blais, who remarked in an address that he "can't help but be surprised when major players throw in the towel on a platform that is the future of content—just two years after it launched. I have to wonder if they are too used to receiving rents from subscribers every month in a protected ecosystem, rather than rolling up their sleeves in order to build a business without regulatory intervention and protection."

No general announcement was made regarding programming rights Shomi had at the time of shutdown. Amazon.com announced that it would expand its video service worldwide for the launch of its new original series The Grand Tour. Shomi held Canadian rights to several Amazon series including Transparent. Since the launch of Amazon's Prime Video service in Canada in December 2016, programs including Transparent and Mozart in the Jungle have appeared on that service, though Shaw Media retained premiere rights to new seasons of Transparent, airing it on Showcase.

Following the shutdown of Shomi, Rogers moved its streaming efforts to CitytvNow and FXNow Canada, both ad-supported video on demand services requiring TV Everywhere authentication through a participating provider to access most programming, but eventually launched an over-the-top service combining the programming of both, Citytv+, in 2022. Corus Entertainment, which acquired Shaw's media assets shortly after the shutdown of Shomi (but not Shaw's interest in Shomi itself), launched its own over-the-top offering, StackTV, in 2019, combining content from its linear networks. Both Citytv+ and StackTV are offered primarily through Prime Video as paid add-on channels.

In 2021, Rogers and Shaw announced plans to merge under the Rogers banner, pending regulatory approvals; the merger was completed in April 2023. There is no indication that Shomi Partnership was ever dissolved, implying that the merger consolidated ownership of the remaining Shomi intellectual property under Rogers.
