= Warrior Strong =

2023 Canadian drama film

- Directed by: Shane Belcourt
- Written by: Dan Gordon
- Produced by: Jason Ross Jallet; Leah Jaunzems; Nicholas Tabarrok
- Starring: Jordan Johnson-Hinds; Sarah Podemski; Andrew Dice Clay
- Cinematography: Daniel Everitt-Lock
- Edited by: Nick Montgomery
- Production company: Darius Films
- Release date: September 18, 2023 (Cinéfest)
- Running time: 98 minutes
- Country: Canada
- Language: English

Warrior Strong is a 2023 Canadian drama film, directed by Shane Belcourt. The film stars Jordan Johnson-Hinds as Bilal Irving, a headstrong aspiring professional basketball player who is asked by his former high school principal Jules (Sarah Podemski) to return to the school as assistant to head basketball coach Avery Schmidt (Andrew Dice Clay).

The cast also includes Stephen Kalyn, Julian Young, Rosa Blasi, Harlan Blayne Kytwayhat, Raoul Bhaneja, Rohan Mead, Dylan Cook, Macaulee Cassaday, Aidan Kalechstein, Keenan Grom and Randy Jernier.

The film entered production in summer 2022, in Northern Ontario.

The film premiered at the 2023 Cinéfest Sudbury International Film Festival.

== See also ==
- List of basketball films
