= Harlan Blayne Kytwayhat =

Cree actor from Canada

- Born: May 28, 1998 (age 28); Makwa Sahgaiehcan First Nation, Saskatchewan, Canada
- Occupations: Actor; musician
- Years active: 2021–present
- Known for: Shoresy, Prey (2022 film)

Harlan Blayne Kytwayhat (born May 28, 1998) is a Cree Canadian actor and musician. He is best known for his regular role as Coach Sanguinet in the television comedy series Shoresy (2022–2024) and for playing Itsee in the 2022 science fiction action film Prey.

A member of the Makwa Sahgaiehcan First Nation from Saskatchewan, he was bartending at the local golf club when a talent agent from Vancouver, visiting the area, invited him to audition for the role of Wendigo Donner in the television series Outlander. Although he didn't ultimately get the role, he made the shortlist and decided to pursue acting, soon landing his first role with a guest appearance in the television series Tribal.

== Early life ==
Kytwayhat was born on May 28, 1998, in Saskatchewan, Canada. He is a member of the Makwa Sahgaiehcan First Nation and grew up in the town of Meadow Lake, located approximately 30 minutes from his home community. From age 11, Kytwayhat performed as a musician, playing guitar, bass, and drums at venues throughout Meadow Lake, Loon Lake, and Saskatoon. He briefly attended college for volleyball before dropping out and working as a bartender at the golf club in Makwa Sahgaiehcan First Nation.

== Career ==
=== Early career ===
In 2019, while working as a bartender at the golf club in Makwa Sahgaiehcan First Nation, Kytwayhat was discovered by a talent agent from Vancouver and invited to audition for Outlander. His first professional role came in 2021 with an appearance in the Canadian crime drama series Tribal.

=== Prey ===
In 2022, Kytwayhat appeared in Prey, the fifth installment in the Predator franchise. He played Itsee, a Comanche hunter in the film set in 1719. He underwent a month-long training bootcamp to learn hand-to-hand combat and Comanche-style archery. The film was released on Hulu on August 5, 2022, to positive reviews.

=== Shoresy ===
Kytwayhat's most prominent role came in 2022 when he was cast as Sanguinet in Shoresy, a spinoff of Letterkenny. His character begins as a rarely-used player on the Sudbury Bulldogs hockey team before transitioning to coach when the team faces closure. Kytwayhat drew on his experience coaching his former high school volleyball team to inform the character's arc. Kytwayhat appeared in 16 episodes across three seasons.

=== Other work ===
In 2023, Kytwayhat appeared in Warrior Strong as Russell. In 2024, he appeared in the short film Nooj Goji/Anywhere, written and directed by Evelyn Pakinewatik, which won the 2025 imagineNATIVE Moon Jury Award. He also appeared in Die Alone alongside Carrie-Anne Moss and Frank Grillo. Kytwayhat continues to pursue music alongside his acting career and has plans to record original songs professionally. He is represented by Premiere Talent Management in Vancouver.

== Filmography ==
=== Film ===
Year	Title	Role	Notes
2022	Prey	Itsee	
2023	Warrior Strong	Russell	
2024	Nooj Goji / Anywhere: A Metaphysical Love Story	George	Winner of the 2025 imagineNATIVE Moon Jury Award
2024	Die Alone	The Fox	

=== Television ===
Year	Title	Role	Notes
2021	Tribal	Jonas Takosin	1 episode
2022–2024	Shoresy	Sanguinet	16 episodes
2025	Renegade Fever	Underground Fight Attendant	1 episode
2025	The Abandons	Strong Heart	3 episodes
