= Jonathan-Ismaël Diaby =

Canadian hockey player, musician and actor (born 1994)

- Born: November 16, 1994 (age 31) Blainville, Quebec, Canada
- Height: 6 ft 5 in (196 cm)
- Weight: 218 lb (99 kg; 15 st 8 lb)
- Position: Defence
- Shot: Left
- Played for: AHL; Milwaukee Admirals; ECHL; Cincinnati Cyclones; LNAH; Jonquière Marquis; QMJHL; Victoriaville Tigres
- NHL draft: 64th overall, 2013; Nashville Predators
- Playing career: 2010–2020

Jonathan-Ismaël Diaby (born November 16, 1994) is a Canadian former professional ice hockey player, rapper and actor who was drafted by the Nashville Predators in the 2013 NHL draft, who played in the AHL, ECHL and LNAH. In his post-playing career, he is a rapper under the name JoDolo, and features in the TV show Shoresy, playing a fictionalised version of himself.

== Early life ==
Diaby was born in Blainville, Quebec on 11 November 1994. His father was a professional soccer player in the Ivory Coast, who settled in Montreal.

== Playing career ==
Diaby started his career playing junior ice hockey in Quebec AAA for Collège Esther-Blondin Phénix, and the QMJHL for the Victoriaville Tigres from 2009 to 2013. Before being drafted by the Nashville Predators in the 3rd round of the 2013 NHL draft.

Diaby was signed to a 3-year deal with the Predators in January 2014. He would not be called up to the NHL during his time in Predators system, playing for their AHL and ECHL affiliates, the Milwaukee Admirals and Cincinnati Cyclones until 2017.

During his time in the Predators system, Diaby was noted for his physicality and fighting ability, getting into eight fights in his debut season.

Diaby would be released from the Predators system in April 2017. He would be selected by the Jonquière Marquis with the 1st pick in the 2018 LNAH draft.

Diaby would play with the Marquis for two seasons. He came to widespread attention for two incidents in 2019, during LNAH games against Petroliers du Nord in Saint-Jérôme, Quebec. On February 23, he was called racial slurs and shown a photo of a baboon on a phone. His family would then be similarly abused, leading to an altercation in the stands. He and his family would then leave the game.

Premier of Quebec François Legault, believed the game should have been stopped to eject the spectators, stating "...We cannot tolerate that a hockey player is insulted because he is black". The Montreal Canadiens condemned the abuse, while the LNAH later apologised to Diaby, banning two fans for life from the arena.

On November 8, after receiving a penalty, Diaby was believed to have again been targeted with racial slurs, leading to him attempting to climb over the penalty box to fight the alleged perpetrator. In the aftermath of the incident, the LNAH handed Diaby a 10-game suspension, stating “It's inconceivable that a player will attack a supporter and the LNAH will never condone that kind of behaviour."

== Music and acting career ==
After his playing career, Diaby became a rapper, under the name JoDolo. His music features in the TV show Shoresy, where he made his acting debut, playing a fictionalised version of himself. He was given creative control for which of his songs would be used in the show. His character speaks in a heavy Québécois accent, which he modelled off watching older hockey movies such as Slap Shot.
