= Jared Keeso =

Canadian actor (born 1984)

- Born: July 1, 1984 (age 42); Listowel, Ontario, Canada
- Occupations: Actor; comedian; screenwriter; producer
- Years active: 2004–present
- Spouse: Magali Brunelle (m. 2018)

Jared Keeso (/ˈkiːsoʊ/ KEE-soh; born July 1, 1984) is a Canadian actor, comedian, screenwriter, and producer. He is best known for creating and starring in the comedy series Letterkenny (2016–2023) and its spinoff Shoresy (2022–present). Letterkenny won a Canadian Screen Award for Best Comedy Series in 2017, and Keeso was also nominated for Best Performance in a Comedy.

Keeso is also known for his roles as Ben Chartier in the television series 19-2 (2014–2017), for which he won a Canadian Screen Award, as Don Cherry in the television films Keep Your Head Up, Kid: The Don Cherry Story (2010) and The Wrath of Grapes: The Don Cherry Story II (2012), for which he won a Leo Award and Gemini Award.

== Early life ==
Keeso was born in Listowel, Ontario, on July 1, 1984, the son of Anne (née Stratychuk) and Richard Keeso. His family owned and operated the Keeso and Sons Sawmill Company, which was founded in 1872, and Keeso spent several years working in the sawmill before embarking on his acting career. The sawmill was destroyed by a fire on September 9, 2018. As a youth, like many boys his age in town, Keeso played junior hockey; he played for the Strathroy Rockets of the GOHL with future two-time Stanley Cup champion Jeff Carter, and also the Listowel Cyclones of the GOHL.

== Career ==
Keeso starred as hockey coach, player, and commentator Don Cherry in two CBC television movies about Cherry's life. The first, Keep Your Head Up Kid: The Don Cherry Story, aired in early 2010, and was followed by The Wrath of Grapes: The Don Cherry Story II in 2012. For his performances, he won a Leo Award for Best Lead Performance by a Male in a Feature Length Drama and a Gemini Award for Best Performance by an Actor in a Leading Role in a Dramatic Program or Mini-Series.

In 2013, Keeso and Mike Borden created Play Fun Games Pictures on YouTube. The channel became an immediate success thanks to a series of shorts sketches depicting the quintessential Canadian farmer and the associated struggles. The series, Letterkenny Problems, has attracted over 100 million views (as of January 2022), and became the basis for the hit 2016 sitcom Letterkenny. The sketches and TV series are both shot in Sudbury, Ontario.

In 2014, Keeso starred in a Heritage Minute about the Winnipeg Falcons, a team of Icelandic-Canadian hockey players who served in the First World War, and later won the country's first Olympic gold medal in hockey.

Following the cult success of Letterkenny, in 2022 Keeso created a spin-off series Shoresy, focusing on the titular character of Shoresy which is also set and shot in Sudbury.

Keeso has had a variety of other roles in both television series and movies, including as Ben Chartier in the 2014 English-language adaptation of 19-2, for which he won a Canadian Screen Award for Best Performance by an Actor in a Continuing Leading Dramatic Role. He also has less prominent roles in a few other films, such as Nicholas in Smokin' Aces 2: Assassins' Ball; Adam in the high-school themed Lifetime original movie Seven Deadly Sins; and Simon in the drug-themed Charlie.

== Filmography ==
=== Film ===
Year	Title	Role	Notes
2006	Shock to the System	Paul Hale	
2007	White Noise: The Light	Jerry	
2009	I Love You, Beth Cooper	Dustin Klepacki	
2010	Smokin' Aces 2: Assassins' Ball	Agent Nicholas	Direct to video
2010	A Beginner's Guide to Endings	Juicebox White	
2012	Charlie	Simon	
2013	The Marine 3: Homefront	Harkin	Direct to video
2013	Elysium	Rico	
2014	Godzilla	Jump Master	
2014	Preggoland	Dr. Ted	
2018	The Death & Life of John F. Donovan	James Donovan	

=== Television ===
Year	Title	Role	Notes
2004	Life As We Know It	Hockey Player #2	Episode: "Secrets & Lies"
2004	Smallville	Nate	Episodes: "Facade" and "Devoted"
2004	Eve's Christmas	Bartender	TV movie
2005	The 4400	Roy Keith Marsden	Episode: "Hidden"
2006	Supernatural	Matt Harrison	Episode: "Children Shouldn't Play with Dead Things"
2006	Firestorm: Last Stand at Yellowstone	Sean Ellis	TV movie
2006	Shock to the System	Paul Hale	TV movie
2006	Seventeen & Missing	Curt	TV movie
2006–2007	Monster Warriors	Luke	53 episodes
2007	The Party Never Stops: Diary of a Binge Drinker	Keith	TV movie
2008	ReGenesis	Tom Wiley	Episode: "Suspicious Minds"
2008–2009	The Guard	Rob Chambers	8 episodes
2009	Caprica	Rod Jenkins	Battlestar Galactica spin-off; untitled pilot aired as TV movie
2010	A Trace of Danger	Adrian	TV movie
2010	Keep Your Head Up, Kid: The Don Cherry Story	Don Cherry	Miniseries
2010	Seven Deadly Sins	Adam Morgan	2 episodes
2010	Psych	Gabe McKinley	Episode: "Chivalry Is Not Dead... But Someone Is"
2011	Hellcats	Luke Powell	Episode: "God Must Have My Fortune Laid Away"
2012	The Secret Circle	Witch Hunter	Episode: "Family"
2012	The Wrath of Grapes: The Don Cherry Story II	Don Cherry	TV miniseries
2013	Falling Skies	Lars	Episode: "On Thin Ice"
2013	Nearlyweds	Mr. Hunky	TV movie
2014–2017	19-2	Ben Chartier	Lead role
2016–2023	Letterkenny	Wayne, Shoresy	Lead role; also creator, writer, and director
2022–present	Shoresy	Shoresy	Lead role; also creator and writer
2026–	I Kill the Bear	Gabby Thibault	Lead role; also creator, writer and producer

== Awards and nominations ==
Accolades for Jared Keeso
Year	Award	Category	Nominated work	Result	Ref.
2015	Canadian Screen Awards	Best Performance by an Actor in a Continuing Leading Dramatic Role	19-2	Won	
2015	Leo Awards	Best Lead Performance By a Male in a Dramatic Series	19-2	Nominated	
2016	Canadian Screen Awards	Best Performance by an Actor in a Continuing Leading Dramatic Role	19-2	Nominated	
2016	Leo Awards	Best Lead Performance By a Male in a Dramatic Series	19-2	Won	
2017	Canadian Screen Awards	Best Comedy Series	Letterkenny	Won	
2017	Canadian Screen Awards	Best Writing in a Comedy Program or Series	Letterkenny	Won	
2017	Canadian Screen Awards	Best Performance by an Actor in a Continuing Leading Comedic Role	Letterkenny	Nominated	
2017	Writers Guild of Canada	Best Writing in a TV Comedy	Letterkenny	Won	
2017	Writers Guild of Canada	Best Script from a Rookie Series	Letterkenny	Nominated	
2017	Leo Awards	Best Music, Comedy or Variety Program or Series	Letterkenny	Won	
