= Keep Your Head Up, Kid: The Don Cherry Story =

- Genre: Biography; Sports
- Written by: Tim Cherry
- Directed by: Jeff Woolnough
- Starring: Jared Keeso; Sarah Manninen; Stephen McHattie
- Country of origin: Canada
- Original language: English
- No. of episodes: 2

Production
- Cinematography: Glen MacPherson

Original release
- Network: CBC Television
- Release: March 28 – March 29, 2010

Related
- The Wrath of Grapes: The Don Cherry Story II

Keep Your Head Up, Kid: The Don Cherry Story is a 2010 two-part biographical television mini-series about Don Cherry.

== Details ==
The mini-series was directed by Jeff Woolnough and written by Don Cherry's son, Tim Cherry. It originally aired March 2010 on CBC Television. It took six years for Tim Cherry to get permission from his father to film the series. It covers Don Cherry's life mainly from his lengthy career as a minor-league hockey player through the end of his tenure coaching the Boston Bruins, ending with a brief montage of more recent events.

== Sequel ==
In 2011, CBC filmed a two-part mini-series, The Wrath of Grapes: The Don Cherry Story II, a sequel to Keep Your Head Up, Kid. It was also directed by Woolnough and written by Andrew Wreggitt, with all of the main cast reprising their roles. It aired in March 2012.

== Cast ==
- Jared Keeso as Don Cherry
- Sarah Manninen as Rose Cherry
- Stephen McHattie as Eddie Shore

== See also ==
- List of films about ice hockey
