= Crave (streaming service) =

Canadian video-on-demand service

- Website type: OTT platform
- Available in: 2 languages
- List of languages: English; French
- Headquarters: Toronto, Ontario
- Country of origin: Canada
- Area served: Nationwide
- Owner: Bell Media
- Key people: Sean Cohan Justin Stockman
- Services: Entertainment
- Website: www.crave.ca
- Registration: Required
- Users: 5.07 million (as of June 30, 2026)
- Launched: December 11, 2014; 11 years ago
- Current status: Active

Crave is a Canadian over-the-top streaming television service owned by the Bell Media subsidiary of BCE Inc.. It is the streaming component of the Crave premium television service, which is also available through participating Canadian television service providers and TV Everywhere. For regulatory purposes, the streaming service and specialty television service are considered to be separate operations.

Crave primarily distributes its own original programming, programs commissioned specifically for other Bell Media linear television services (such as CTV and Noovo), as well as content licensed from third-party studios and distributors. Crave is available either as a direct-to-consumer service

The service originally launched in December 2014 as CraveTV, and it was originally focused on television series. CraveTV was initially sold exclusively via participating television providers until 2015, when direct-to-consumer options were made available. In 2018, CraveTV was merged into Bell's existing pay television service The Movie Network (TMN), with both services rebranded as Crave. The service was relaunched in French-speaking Canada as well, integrating with TMN's French-language counterpart Super Écran. Crave has since been positioned as a more direct competitor to U.S.-based streaming services (such as Netflix), combining TMN's film catalogue with rights to HBO and, previously, Showtime original programming.

As of 2026, Crave's major programming suppliers are Skydance Corporation (HBO/HBO Max programming and Warner Bros. films), Sony Pictures (theatrical films from labels including Columbia), and Starz (which is available as an add-on). In 2025, Crave subsumed the streaming platforms and apps for other Bell Media properties, adding livestreaming and on-demand programming from CTV, Noovo, and their sister non-sports specialty networks, as well as free ad-supported streaming television (FAST) content from CTV.

== Service structure ==
The Crave video-on-demand service is registered with the CRTC as a licence-exempt "hybrid" VOD service, allowing its programming to be offered on-demand through cable/IPTV service providers, without an accompanying linear channel, provided that it is also available via the Internet on a direct-to-consumer basis. Regardless of subscription method, programming is available for streaming through Crave's website, mobile apps, video game consoles, smart TVs and other devices; when subscribed to through a TV provider, some or all programming may be also available through that provider's set-top boxes.

Bell's Crave (formerly TMN), Starz (formerly Encore), and Super Écran linear TV channels are offered under separate licences, however upon its relaunch in November 2018, the direct-to-consumer Crave service launched add-on tiers which includes access to the programming and linear streams of the Crave linear service, and eventually Starz and Super Écran. At the same time, subscribers to the former TMN linear service began to receive access to the former CraveTV VOD library at no additional charge, when signed into the Crave streaming platform via TV Everywhere.

On October 26, 2021, all programming previously included in the Movies + HBO and Super Écran add-ons, and access to the Crave and Super Écran linear channels, was moved into the main library, effectively eliminating the former entry-level programming tier. Direct-to-consumer packages are now divided into "Crave Mobile" and "Crave Total" plans; Crave Mobile, which has the same price as the previous entry-level tier, provides access to up to 720p quality video on a single mobile or browser-based device at a time, while Crave Total, which has approximately the same price as the previous Crave + Movies + HBO (and is marketed as simply "Crave" on most TV service providers), offers up to four simultaneous streams of video at up to 4K resolution (depending on program availability) through a maximum of five registered devices. Customers that subscribed to Crave's previous entry-level package directly through the service's website were offered Crave Total on a trial basis until March 2022.

Starz programming remains available on Crave solely through a separate paid add-on. Additionally, both Starz and Super Écran continue to be available individually through TV service providers. Such subscribers can access programming for their subscribed services through the Crave platform using TV Everywhere authentication, however in these cases they do not receive access to other Crave programming.

=== 2018–21 packaging ===
From November 1, 2018, to October 25, 2021, programming on the Crave streaming platform was divided between up to four packages:

- Crave – entry-level package including most original programming from Showtime, previously aired HBO programming, past seasons of selected current HBO and Starz programming, and other Canadian and international programming, much of which is available on Hulu in the U.S. and/or has aired previously on other Bell Media channels. Programming is available in both English and French, though not all programming in one language is available in the other. Direct-to-consumer subscribers were required to subscribe to this package to be able to purchase add-on subscriptions.
- Movies + HBO – add-on subscription providing access to the Crave linear TV channels (including the Canadian version of HBO) and on-demand access to their associated programming. This includes most first-run HBO (U.S.) programming and exclusive "first window" subscription streaming rights to recent theatrical films including those distributed by Warner Bros., 20th Century Studios, (Note: That is, films distributed by Walt Disney Studios Motion Pictures under the former labels of 21st Century Fox (also including Searchlight and Blue Sky), but not Disney's other film labels.) Universal Pictures, and Sony Pictures (theatrical releases through mid-2019), which are typically added about 8 months after theatrical release. Bell Media has stated there is no difference in the programming available to direct-to-consumer subscribers to Crave with the "Movies + HBO" addon compared to those subscribed to the Crave pay TV service via a traditional TV service provider.
- Starz – add-on subscription (launched early 2019) corresponding to the Canadian version of Starz, including most first-run Starz (U.S.) programming, certain first-run Lionsgate films, additional series from Hulu and the Lionsgate library, and older theatrical films from various distributors
- Super Écran – add-on subscription (launched early 2020) corresponding to Bell's French-language pay channel Super Écran, including original series, French-language (dubbed or subtitled) versions of programming from HBO and select acquisitions and theatrical films, with a lineup similar but not exactly the same as the films carried in English by Crave

== History and distribution ==
At some point following the launch of Netflix in Canada in 2010, several domestic media companies including the media divisions of Bell, Rogers, and Shaw, as well as cinema operator Cineplex, were reportedly in talks to launch a joint-venture Canadian streaming service. However, these talks broke down, and the companies ultimately launched separate initiatives, with Cineplex focusing on its Cineplex Store transactional video-on-demand platform, which launched in 2012, and Rogers and Shaw announcing a jointly owned streaming service named Shomi in 2014.

Shortly after the announcement of Shomi, on October 30, 2014, Bell Media revealed its own streaming and video-on-demand service focused on TV series programming, initially referring to it by the code name "Project Latte". The final name of CraveTV was revealed a few days before launch that December, as was its monthly price of $4 per month – half the monthly Canadian price of Netflix at the time, or roughly the retail price of a latte (hence the code name).

However, unlike Netflix which was sold directly to consumers via the Internet, CraveTV was only made available on launch as an add-on for subscribers of television service providers owned by Bell Canada (including Bell Satellite TV, Bell Fibe TV, and Bell Aliant), along with Eastlink and Telus. In February 2015, Access Communications, Cable Cable, Nexicom, and the cable TV division of Bell subsidiary Northwestel were added, giving the service wider availability in Saskatchewan and Northern Canada.

Former logo for CraveTV used until November 2018

At the time of launch Bell did not indicate any plans to make CraveTV available on a standalone over-the-top basis, instead stating that CraveTV would "enhance the value of the subscription television ecosystem" and would be "available to every TV provider in Canada". Kevin Crull, president of Bell Media at the time, contended that television content on any streaming service "[would not] exist if you didn't have the traditional TV system. So you really can't sustainably have one without the other." Further, he stated that the service would not "cannibalize" Bell's investment in traditional linear television services. Tying the service to a television service also counters the trend of "cord cutting", in which one drops cable or satellite television in favor of exclusively obtaining television programming over-the-air and through SVOD services.

On July 13, 2015, Bell announced that CraveTV would transition to an over-the-top service available to all users, regardless of provider, in January 2016. That month, the service when sold through TV providers increased in price from $4 to $6 per-month. On January 14, 2016, CraveTV was launched as an over-the-top service, costing $7.99 per-month. Prices were raised again in May 2018, with the direct-to-consumer price increasing to $9.99.

=== Merger with Bell Media premium services (2018–2025) ===
In October 2018, a Rogers Cable service bulletin stated that beginning in November, subscribers to The Movie Network (TMN) would begin to receive CraveTV as part of their service.

On November 1, 2018, Bell announced that CraveTV had merged with TMN as Crave (with the combined service initially promoted as "the all-new Crave"). Under the service's new structure, Crave introduced a $19.98 "Crave + Movies + HBO" tier that added access to TMN's content, including its film library, first-run HBO programming, and live streaming of the Crave and HBO Canada linear channels. The TMN Go apps would be replaced by those of Crave, with subscribers receiving access to Crave at no additional charge via TV Everywhere authentication. The existing CraveTV service without films or current HBO programming became Crave's entry-level plan, and remained available at its existing $9.99 direct-to-consumer price. Distribution of the basic Crave service through service providers (in some cases at a lower price) also continued, now including additional providers such as Rogers Cable. Bell Media head Randy Lennox cited increasing competition with Netflix as a basis for the decision. The following spring, a Canadian version of Starz (which replaced TMN Encore on linear television) was launched on the Crave platform as an add-on, with a direct-to-consumer monthly price of $5.99.

On January 21, 2020, Bell announced that Crave would expand into the French-language market on January 28 of that year. The service promoted that it would add roughly 5,000 hours of content in French to the service for all subscribers (including the new original series Pour toujours, plus un jour), and add a French-language premium tier in conjunction with Bell's Super Écran network. The Super Écran Go app was similarly replaced by Crave.

On October 26, 2021, Bell changed Crave's pricing model to be based on concurrent streams and device support. The "Crave + Movies + HBO" tier was renamed to "Crave Total (which allows up to four concurrent streams, and access via PC, mobile, and connected devices), and the existing entry-level plan was replaced by a "Crave Mobile" plan at the same $9.99 price point, which allows access to the content from the "Crave + Movies + HBO" tier on one PC or mobile device. In July 2023, Crave introduced ad-supported tiers, replacing "Crave Mobile" at its price point with an ad-supported "Basic with Ads" (one stream at up to 720p), and "Standard with Ads" at $14.99 (up to four streams at up to 1080p); both tiers carry up to five minutes of advertising per-hour, and do not include access to the Crave linear channels. "Crave Total" was renamed "Crave Premium".

In 2025, Bell began to offer bundles of Crave with TSN's OTT service. In June 2025, Bell announced an agreement with Disney Streaming to offer a bundle of Crave, TSN, and Disney+. In December 2025, Bell announced an agreement with Radio-Canada to bundle Crave with Ici TOU.TV Extra.

=== Platform update, merger with Bell Media terrestrial and FAST services (2025–present) ===
In June 2025, Bell announced that Crave would be updated by the end of 2025 to include a new free tier and subsume CTV and Noovo's free ad-supported streaming television (FAST) services, including access to the CTV Movies and CTV Throwback services and additional programming from CTV and Noovo. Updated Crave apps launched in late-November 2025, with a new user interface, the aforementioned free tier, and live streaming of CTV, Noovo, and other Bell Media networks. Head of product and experience Jerrell Jimerson (formerly of Disney Streaming) explained that the changes were meant to allow Crave users to have "one place to find everything they want to watch". The CTV website and apps initially remained active following this change, but were decommissioned on May 1, 2026, with users redirected to Crave.

== Device support and technical features ==
The Crave streaming platform supports access through most modern Web browsers, as well as apps for iOS/iPadOS, Android and Android TV devices, Apple TV, Samsung Smart TVs produced since 2014, Xbox One/Series X/Series S, Amazon Fire TV, Chromecast, Roku, and PlayStation 4/5 (since 2020). Crave's website does not support access on Linux or ChromeOS operating systems, nor in the Opera browser. However, videos can play on ChromeOS.

TV service providers that offer Crave can also offer streaming access to its library to their subscribers through the provider's own platforms; some of these platforms may support additional devices. For example, VMedia offers a Roku app which includes access to Crave programming for those subscribing through that provider, which was available before Crave's own Roku app was released.

Beginning in August 2021, select content, including recent Warner Bros. films, began to be offered in 4K resolution on compatible devices including Apple TV 4K, Android TV, Fire TV, and Chromecast. Select devices also support 5.1 surround sound. Support for AirPods spatial audio was added to the iOS app in March 2022.

In November 2025, Jimerson stated that support for HDR and Dolby Vision would be added in the future as part of the revamped Crave infrastructure.

=== Accessibility ===
Crave's website and apps support closed captioning. Although much of Crave's programming on its linear channels since fall 2019 has included described video (DV) when accessed through a TV provider set-top box under CRTC rules, support for DV in streaming video was not added until March 2022, when it began to be supported on Apple devices.

== Content agreements ==
As CraveTV, the service was oriented primarily towards television series, carrying over 10,000 hours of programming on-launch; Bell expected the library to double within a year of the service's launch. Among the programs that were exclusive to CraveTV at launch were programs broadcast by other Bell properties (such as The Big Bang Theory, Doctor Who, and Agents of S.H.I.E.L.D.) and Comedy Central original series. Some series have moved off the service or become co-exclusives with other services over time; for example, Agents of S.H.I.E.L.D. also became available on Disney+ after its launch, before later moving off Crave entirely. Other notable series that were exclusively available on CraveTV in its early years but have since had their rights acquired by other services include Seinfeld (moved to Netflix globally in 2021) and South Park (moved to Paramount+ in Canada in early 2022 as part of a longer-term global move).

In October 2014, shortly before launch, Bell announced a deal with HBO to bring the U.S. service's "off-air" programming (i.e. series no longer in production), such as The Sopranos, Sex and the City, The Wire, Crashbox, and various older HBO-produced television films, documentaries, and stand-up comedy specials, to CraveTV. At the time of launch, current HBO programming remained exclusive to HBO Canada, a multiplex channel of The Movie Network; it was added to Crave's premium tier in 2018, and became available in all Crave tiers in 2022.

On January 29, 2015, Bell announced a similar licensing deal with Showtime, which would see most of its off-air library added to CraveTV as well.

In March 2015, CraveTV announced the acquisition and production of Letterkenny, the service's first original series.

In February 2016, Bell Media announced that it had acquired exclusive rights to the current incarnation of Doctor Who, with CraveTV adding series 9 later that year, series 1 through 8 by the end of the year, and completed series added to the service following the conclusion of their first-run airings on Space (now CTV Sci-Fi Channel). In July 2016, Bell Media announced that it had acquired rights to current and past Star Trek television series for CraveTV and its cable networks (such as Space), including the then-upcoming Star Trek: Discovery. Bell subsequently announced similar deals for subsequent Star Trek series, including Picard, Lower Decks, and Strange New Worlds, despite CBS All Access (now Paramount+), which streams all of the newer Star Trek series in the United States, having launched in Canada.

On October 24, 2016, Bell announced that new and returning Showtime programming would become available on CraveTV day-and-date with their U.S. premiere, beginning with the third-season premiere of The Affair. Previously, they were only added after their seasons concluded on The Movie Network.

In June 2017, Bell reached a deal to sell Comedy Gold to Wow Unlimited Media. As part of the sale, Wow agreed to provide content for Bell Media's OTT ventures. In September 2018, CraveTV launched the "Wow! Preschool Playdate" and "Wow! World Kids" collections. The first anime title put on Crave as a result of this partnership, on September 18, 2020, was the Viz Media English dub of Sailor Moon; it was removed from the platform three years later.

In June 2019, Crave acquired streaming rights to the American and British versions of RuPaul's Drag Race, as part of a partnership with LGBT specialty network OutTV to co-commission a Canadian version of the franchise, Canada's Drag Race. Both outlets share the Canadian rights to all three series, and premiere new episodes on the same day as their domestic broadcast.

On October 30, 2019, Bell announced a further expansion to its agreement with HBO parent WarnerMedia (later Warner Bros. Discovery and now Skydance Corporation), adding rights to HBO Max original scripted programs produced by Warner Bros. Television and its subsidiaries, in addition to extending Crave's rights to HBO main channel programming and first-window pay rights to Warner Bros. films. All HBO Max programs covered by the agreement are available on the Crave streaming platform, with the option for linear television airings on Bell networks as well. This specific agreement did not cover HBO Max programming commissioned from other studios, most animated programs, or other library content which became part of the HBO Max service in the U.S. Crave already held (or later separately acquired) Canadian streaming rights to many, but not all, of the remaining programs, including library rights to Doctor Who, The Big Bang Theory, and Friends.

In December 2022, Crave announced a reactivated deal with Sony Pictures for pay-1 rights to its theatrical releases beginning in April 2023, returning to the service after a stint on Amazon Prime Video from 2020 to 2022.

In January 2023, Bell Media confirmed that Crave's overall agreement with Showtime had ended at the end of 2022, with other agreements for Comedy Central and Star Trek programming ending or being revised shortly thereafter. Future programming from these brands, all of which are owned by Paramount Global, are expected to stream in Canada on the co-owned Paramount+. New seasons of Showtime series already on Crave and still in production, such as Yellowjackets, continue to be available on the service, while some MTV programming continues to be added to the service (with other programs being hosted on Paramount+).

In October 2024, Bell Media renewed its rights to HBO and HBO Max original productions for a multi-year period of undisclosed length; the extension was to settle litigation surrounding Bell Media's loss of rights to Discovery Channel properties to Rogers in 2025, and also includes co-production and distribution pacts for Bell Media original series.

== Reception ==
=== Initial reception ===
In February 2015, the Consumers' Association of Canada and the Public Interest Advocacy Centre filed a complaint with the Canadian Radio-television and Telecommunications Commission (CRTC) against both CraveTV and the competing service Shomi, arguing that their exclusivity primarily to those who are subscribers of their respective owners' television services was a form of tied selling that "[discriminates] against customers who wish to only view programming through an Internet service provider of their choice".

On March 12, 2015, the CRTC announced new proposed regulations for video on demand services, creating a new category for "hybrid online video-on-demand" services between unregulated digital services and licensed video on demand services offered by television providers. Licensed VOD services are not allowed to offer "exclusive" content and are also subject to genre protection and Canadian content rules. Hybrid services would not be bound to the aforementioned rules, including the ability to offer "exclusive" content, and can be made accessible through a provider's set-top box, but they must be also offered over-the-top on a standalone basis without a television subscription.

The CRTC did not explicitly state whether CraveTV or Shomi would be classified as a "hybrid" VOD service under its proposed regulations, which would have required them to offer their service on a standalone basis; a Bell spokesperson argued that CraveTV would not be subject to the requirements because it is a licensed VOD provider, and its content was not "exclusive" because Bell has offered the service for other providers. Nonetheless, Bell eventually registered CraveTV with the CRTC as a hybrid VOD service, and began to offer it on a standalone basis.

Current Reception

CraveTV currently holds a rating of F with the Better Business Bureau for failure to respond to or resolve complaints filed against them, of which there are 82.

=== Subscribers ===
It has been speculated that the closure of Shomi on November 30, 2016, would benefit CraveTV, which had shortly before hit one million subscribers.

In February 2019, parent company BCE said that following the consolidation with TMN, Crave had reached 2.3 million subscriptions across all versions/levels of the service, and had become "profitable"; the user base had grown to over 3 million subscriptions by March 2022. This includes households – which totalled approximately 1.8 million in August 2020, according to CRTC records released in July 2021 – that receive this access as part of their subscription to the legacy Crave pay TV service. In comparison, main competitor Netflix reported 6.5 million subscriptions in Canada as of the end of September 2019, one of the few times Netflix has released specific data regarding Canada.

Subscribers	As of	Ref
727,000	June 30, 2015	
Over 1 million	September 30, 2016	
1.3 million	December 31, 2017	
2.3 million (Note: All subscriber counts after November 2018 include subscribers to the Crave linear pay TV channels, who can access the streaming platform at no extra charge (though not all have necessarily done so).)	December 31, 2018	
Over 2.7 million	June 30, 2019	
2.6 million	December 31, 2019	
2.7 million	March 31, 2020	
2.8 million	June 30, 2020	
Approx. 2.7-2.8 million (Note: BCE announced a 3% year-over-year increase in Crave subscribers as of September 2020 compared to September 2019, but has not announced a numeric value for either date. Value is approximated as a 3% increase over the range of subscriber counts announced for June and December 2019.)	September 30, 2020	
2.8 million	December 31, 2020	
2.9 million	March 31, 2021	
Approx. 2.97 million	June 30, 2021	
Approx. 2.94 million (Note: BCE announced a 5% year-over-year increase in Crave subscribers as of September 2021 compared to September 2020, but has not announced a numeric value for either date. Value is approximated as a 5% increase over the subscriber count of 2.8 million announced for both June and December 2020.)	September 30, 2021	
Over 2.9 million (Note: Approximated in the graph as 2.96 million, as BCE said the number of subscribers had increased 6% compared to year-end 2020 (2.8 million).)	December 31, 2021	
Over 3 million	March 31, 2022	
3.124 million	December 31, 2022	
3.1 million	December 31, 2023	
Over 3.6 million	December 31, 2024	
4.6 million	December 31, 2025	
5.07 million	June 30, 2026	

View source data.

== See also ==
- TV Everywhere
- List of streaming media services
