= Beau Is Afraid (soundtrack) =

Film score by Bobby Krlic
- Released: April 14, 2023
- Genre: Film score; dark ambient; modern classical
- Length: 38:05
- Label: A24 Music
- Producer: Bobby Krlic

Bobby Krlic chronology
Beef (2023)	Beau Is Afraid (2023)	Blue Beetle (2023)

Beau Is Afraid (Original Score) is the score album to the 2023 film of the same name directed by Ari Aster and starring Joaquin Phoenix. The film's original score is written and composed by Bobby Krlic whom he collaborated with Aster in Midsommar (2019). The score was released by A24 Music on April 14, 2023.

== Background ==
Krlic felt Beau Is Afraid as one of his difficult scores, as the film keeps changing when it jumps world to world so as the tone and rhythms, though the rhythm needed to be cohesive and felt hard to find those themes, which was "long and arduous". Aster recalled that the original ideas were smaller than the final draft. Hence, he had to collaborate with a music editor for the first time in his career. Katherine Miller, served as the music editor and score producer who helped with finding the themes and asked the suggestions to place the cues in the edit. Both Krlic and Aster praised Miller's contribution to the film, as she saved a couple of themes by placing elsewhere from the original theme as "it just did not work".

He called the mother's theme as "very strong and clear" but "Suburban Dream" was "revelatory". He also had an epiphany for the cue to be experimented with the final piece of music to bring that feeling of a "melancholy suburban dream" and mixed it with a vocal motif which appears through each act as it felt like a "siren that is a thread, unbeknownst to Beau and guiding him to the final act". The instrumentation consisted of low cellos, violas and violin, to bring a feeling of detachment and displacement. Krlic admitted that the main challenge was "having things that can be definitive, but can also, much like the film, turn on a dime and take you by surprise and be able to move fluidly between different places".

== Release ==
The track "Sail Away" from the soundtrack, preceded as the lead single on March 28, 2023. The album was released by A24 Music on April 14, 2023 in a five-disc format through digital formats. A vinyl edition in "sail away blue" followed on July, with a bonus song not featured on the digital release ("A Play Within a Play Within a Film").

== Track listing ==
=== Digital release ===
Disc 1
No.	Title	Length
1.	"Notes"	2:08
2.	"Always with Water"	2:59
3.	"Invasion"	1:21
4.	"Stuck Outside"	1:43
5.	"Back Inside"	2:29
6.	"Flight of the Birthday Boy Stab Man"	1:32

Disc 2
No.	Title	Length
1.	"Jeeves Juju"	1:23
2.	"Suburban Dream"	2:54
3.	"Three Things"	1:05

Disc 3
No.	Title	Length
1.	"The Forest"	2:54
2.	"Jeeves Attacks"	1:16

Disc 4
No.	Title	Length
1.	"Homecoming"	2:33
2.	"The Sessions"	1:33
3.	"The Attic"	3:18
4.	"Sail Away"	3:04

Disc 5
No.	Title	Length
1.	"The Trial"	4:01
2.	"The Heavens"	1:52
Total length:		38:14

=== Vinyl release ===
Side A
No.	Title	Length
1.	"Notes"	2:08
2.	"Always with Water"	2:59
3.	"Invasion"	1:21
4.	"Stuck Outside"	1:43
5.	"Back Inside"	2:29
6.	"Flight of the Birthday Boy Stab Man"	1:32
7.	"Jeeves Juju"	1:23
8.	"Suburban Dream"	2:54
9.	"Three Things"	1:06
10.	"The Forest"	2:54
11.	"Jeeves Attacks"	1:16

Side B
No.	Title	Length
1.	"A Play Within a Play Within a Film"
2.	"Homecoming"	2:33
3.	"The Sessions"	1:33
4.	"The Attic"	3:18
5.	"Sail Away"	3:04
6.	"The Trial"	4:01
7.	"The Heavens"	1:52

== Reception ==
Nick Allen of RogerEbert.com wrote "like the intense strings of Bobby Krlic’s score, its pressing atonal nature at such a high volume becomes numbing". Tim Grierson of Screen International and David Ehrlich of IndieWire complimented the score as "moaning" and "atonal". James Preston Poole of The Cosmic Circus wrote "the lush score courtesy of Bobby Krlic alternates between serene and discordant." William Stottor of Filmhounds Magazine called it as a "remarkable original score of evocative beauty and terrifying distortion".
