= Blue Beetle (soundtrack) =

Blue Beetle (Original Motion Picture Soundtrack)

Film score by Bobby Krlic
- Released: August 18, 2023
- Genre: Film score
- Length: 86:04
- Label: WaterTower
- Producer: Bobby Krlic

Bobby Krlic chronology
Beau is Afraid (2023)	Blue Beetle (2023)	Eddington (2025)

Singles from Blue Beetle (Original Motion Picture Soundtrack)
- 1. "Blue Beetle Suite" Released: August 11, 2023

Blue Beetle (Original Motion Picture Soundtrack) is the soundtrack to the 2023 film Blue Beetle directed by Ángel Manuel Soto. Based on the DC Comics character of the same name, the film is the 14th installment in the DC Extended Universe (DCEU).

== Production and release ==
Bobby Krlic was confirmed to score the film by the trailer's release in April 2023. A soundtrack album featuring his score was released by WaterTower Music on August 18, 2023; a track from the soundtrack album, "Blue Beetle Suite", was released as a single on August 11.

== Track listing ==
All music is composed by Bobby Krlic, except where noted.

Blue Beetle (Original Motion Picture Soundtrack)
No.	Title	Performer(s)	Length
1.	"The Sphere"		3:38
2.	"Victoria Kord"		1:01
3.	"Stealing the Scarab"		3:17
4.	"The Transformation"		2:35
5.	"Stratosphere Flight"		1:17
6.	"Jaime Wakes Up"		2:46
7.	"Breaking into Kord"		2:09
8.	"Kord Tower Fight"		6:06
9.	"Ted Kord's Lair"		2:52
10.	"Healing"		0:43
11.	"Jenny's Childhood"		2:19
12.	"Good News and Bad News"		2:44
13.	"Before the Raid"		1:16
14.	"Manifest Fight"		0:54
15.	"Reyes House Attack"		4:40
16.	"Heart Attack"		3:21
17.	"Activating the Bug Ship"		2:07
18.	"Dad's Gadgets"		3:28
19.	"Nana Leads"		1:19
20.	"Bug Ship to the Island"		1:05
21.	"Leaving the Bug Ship"		3:44
22.	"The Cosmic Realm"		3:59
23.	"Rebooting"		3:28
24.	"Nana's Theme"		0:54
25.	"Blue Beetle vs Carapax Pt 1"		3:20
26.	"Blue Beetle vs Carapax Pt 2"		4:20
27.	"Sacrifices for the Greater Good" (featuring Daniela Lalita)		5:43
28.	"Now We Can Cry"		2:42
29.	"Blue Beetle Suite"		4:16
30.	"Será Que No Me Amas (Blame It on the Boogie)"	Damian Castroviejo	4:10
31.	"Tú Serás Mi Baby (Be My Baby)"	Juventud Crasa	2:51
Total length:			86:04

== Additional music ==
Blue Beetle featured both American and Latino songs, including:

- "Atrévete-te-te" by Calle 13
- "La Chona" by Los Tucanes de Tijuana
- "Cumbia poder" by Celso Pina
- "Sin Ti" by Los Panchos
- Será Que No Me Amas (Blame It on the Boogie) by Damian Castroviejo
- "María la del Barrio" by Thalía
- "Cue From Cronos" written by Javier Álvarez
- "Deportivo" by Álvaro Diaz and Cazzu
- "Gracias a la vida" by Alberto Cortez
- "Nos Escapamos" by RaiNao
- "El Rey" by Vicente Fernández
- "Muchos Quieren Tumbarme" by Ivy Queen
- "Demolición" by Los Saicos
- "Cumbia Sampuesana" by Celso Piña Y Su Ronda Bogotá
- "Tú Serás Mi Baby (Be My Baby)" by Juventud Crasa
- "Al Reves" by Los Wálters
- "Armando Sanchez" by Chalino Sánchez
- "Bidi Bidi Bom Bom" by Selena
- "Solo Contigo Basta" by Alfredo Linares
- "Kickstart My Heart" by Mötley Crüe
- "I Ain't Goin' Out Like That" by Cypress Hill
- "Koonex Koonex" by Daniela Lalita
- "Sabor A Mí" by Los Panchos
- "Nada Personal" by Soda Stereo
- "All Out of Love" by Air Supply
