= Beef (soundtrack) =

2023 soundtrack album by Bobby Krlic

Beef (Original Score)

Soundtrack album by Bobby Krlic
- Released: April 6, 2023
- Recorded: 2022–2023
- Genre: Ambience; experimental; indie rock; orchestral
- Length: 45:14
- Label: A24 Music
- Producer: Bobby Krlic

Bobby Krlic chronology
Returnal (2022)	Beef (2023)	Beau Is Afraid (2023)

Beef (Original Score) is the soundtrack to the 2023 comedy-drama television series of the same name created for Netflix and produced by A24. The series' original score is composed by Bobby Krlic and released on the same date as its premiere, April 6, 2023 by A24 Music. The series' featured music from the 1990s and early 2000s, and Krlic's score threaded the featuring songs in each episode.

== Development ==
"We discovered that all the music that we listened to in our formative teenage years was pretty much the same. And a lot of that stuff would be kind of synced throughout the show and finish in a really unique way. So we were trying to find something that felt current with the score, but also something that could feel like maybe somebody's gonna Shazam the score thinking it's a needle drop. So having something that feels very now, and also kind of fits seamlessly with other musical things going on in the show as well."

— Bobby Krlic

The series' score is composed and produced by Bobby Krlic, known for his collaborations with A24—the Ari Aster-directed Midsommar (2019) and Beau Is Afraid (2023). Krlic opted for music from the 1990s to indicate the emotional expression of Danny (Steven Yeun) and Amy (Ali Wong). He told to TheWrap: "The '90s was this golden period where people just had their hearts on their sleeves with that kind of music. They just express things very matter of factly and in a really unique, emotional way." The showrunner Lee Sung Jin shared a bond with Krlic over the influences and love for the 1990s music, making it as "the most fun, musical experience of [his] life" and insisted music supervisor Timmy Anders to pick the songs that suited with the narrative, saying that "It took some personal letters to some frontman bands, but it all worked out."

He wanted the score that "didn't say too much" and sounded like a ticking clock, which Krlic admitted "Everybody inside is just so wound up and so tense, finding something kind of small, and almost irritating [was the goal]. We almost wanted to irritate the audience and be like, 'Why does this thing just keep going?'"

At IndieWire's "Consider This Event" held at Los Angeles on June 3, 2023, editor Laura Zempel, who attended the event with Krlic said that the most important thing was that "the characters feel real — they go completely off the rails, but you need to understand where they're coming from". Most of the music had been written even before the final edit. Krlic felt that for Danny, he had a jagged musical accompaniment as "from the very first frame of the show, there's all this tension all this anxiety" attributed to his life, while for Amy, "her life felt much more about the façade of things" which resulted in using a glockenspiel and piano to describe her character.

== Track listing ==
No.	Title	Length
1.	"The Beef"	2:28
2.	"Cho Bros"	2:09
3.	"Amy and George"	1:16
4.	"Hibachi Suicide"	1:14
5.	"Notifications"	0:33
6.	"On the Up"	0:37
7.	"At Cho Service"	0:44
8.	"Stress Eating"	1:11
9.	"Arena K-Town Spectre"	2:13
10.	"Breakthrough Moments"	3:43
11.	"Seven Years"	1:46
12.	"Stealing for Church"	2:00
13.	"Hotel Room Hang"	0:24
14.	"Lobster Breakfast"	1:17
15.	"Ugly Choices"	0:40
16.	"Stuck Up Bitch"	1:47
17.	"Mommy's Name Is Amy"	1:09
18.	"Like the Ground, But in Here"	1:04
19.	"A New Hope"	0:36
20.	"Yahoo Chess"	0:33
21.	"Young Amy"	0:41
22.	"University Papers"	1:32
23.	"It's Zane"	0:34
24.	"Everything Fades"	1:16
25.	"Zugzwang"	4:56
26.	"The Great Fabricator"	5:27
27.	"Figures of Light"	3:24
Total length:		45:14

== Bonus tracks ==
Beef: The Bonus Tracks

EP by Bobby Krlic
- Released: June 15, 2023
- Recorded: 2022–2023
- Genre: Ambience; experimental; orchestral
- Length: 7:13
- Label: A24 Music
- Producer: Bobby Krlic

Beef: The Bonus Tracks is an extended play featuring additional tracks that were not included in the album. Released by June 15, 2023, the album featured seven title cues complementing the 10-episode series and a cover of Incubus' 2000 single "Drive" performed by Yeun. It was released as a single leading the EP on June 13.

No.	Title	Length
1.	"The Birds Don't Sing, They Screech in Pain"	0:13
2.	"I Am Inhibited By a Cry"	0:24
3.	"Such Inward Secret Creatures"	0:12
4.	"I Am a Cage"	0:37
5.	"Just Not All At the Same Time"	0:28
6.	"Figures of Light"	0:21
7.	"The Drama of Original Choice"	0:54
8.	"Drive" (Steven Yeun)	4:01
Total length:		7:10
