= Midsommar (soundtrack) =

Midsommar (Original Motion Picture Score)

Film score by Bobby Krlic
- Released: July 5, 2019
- Recorded: 2019
- Genre: Electronic; industrial; experimental
- Length: 40:32
- Label: Milan
- Producer: Bobby Krlic

Bobby Krlic chronology
The Alienist (2019)	Midsommar (2019)	Red Dead Redemption 2 (2019)

Midsommar (Original Motion Picture Score) is the soundtrack to the 2019 film of the same name. It contains the instrumental score for the film, written, composed and produced by electronic and industrial musician The Haxan Cloak, who was credited under his real name Bobby Krlic. Krlic researched various elements related to traditional folk from Nordic countries and experimented with various instrumentation, from traditional orchestra to electronic music.

The album was released by Milan Records on July 5, 2019, with a vinyl edition later followed on September. It received critical acclaim and has been considered as one of the best soundtracks of the decade.

== Development ==
Ari Aster wrote the script while listening to Krlic's 2013 album Excavation which "put him in a space that felt inextricable" and felt his contribution to the score would be apt for the film. He communicated to Krlic through emails, with the latter sending source music and thoughts through virtual communication but as the results were not satisfying, Aster went to Los Angeles to work on the score together in person. Aster felt that he and Krlic share similar sensibilities through the sonic nature of the film. He recorded the score within a week, eight hours per day and was supervised by Aster on the musical score and soundscape apt for the film.

The score for Midsommar contained numerous electronic textures which he wanted to imitate that of Musique concrète. It would be followed by a 16-piece orchestra with double bass, cello and violins, all of them recorded at Air Studios, London. The musicians experimented Krlic's recordings in tape which consisted of slowed down beats of high strings, gongs, cymbals to create a "strange, unsettling feel" and from his home made strings, they would replay all of the electronic music done through strings. To fabricate ancient folk music, he further researched a lot of traditional Nordic, Scandinavian and Icelandic music through instrument libraries, which could he write for older instruments as most of them were rooted in Swedish folk music.

The script had lot of diegetic music written with the Swedish members of the Hårgas providing vocals through wordless atonal singing. Jessika Kenney provided the same through her interpretation of sacred texts into song, and fabricated the vocal language for the characters to sing as it had been made out of different parts from ancient languages she put together.

== Track listing ==
No.	Title	Length
1.	"Prophesy"	0:32
2.	"Gassed"	4:28
3.	"Hålsingland"	3:05
4.	"The House that Hårga Built"	3:33
5.	"Attestupan"	3:31
6.	"Ritual In Transfigured Time"	1:28
7.	"Murder (Mystery)"	6:15
8.	"The Blessing"	3:04
9.	"Chorus of Sirens"	1:38
10.	"A Language of Sex"	0:44
11.	"Hårga, Collapsing"	2:40
12.	"Fire Temple"	9:34
Total length:		40:32

== Reception ==
Professional ratings
Aggregate scores
Source	Rating
Metacritic	86/100
Review scores
Source	Rating
AllMusic	4.5/5 stars
Consequence	B+
The Line of Best Fit	9/10
Mojo	5/5 stars
Pitchfork	7.6/10
Uncut	8/10

The review aggregating website, Metacritic which uses a weighted average, assigned the album a score of 86 out of 100 based on 10 critics, indicating "universal acclaim".

A review from Mojo summarised that "Krlic has created a world in which the music of ancient tradition works like a sonic virus that simultaneously soothes and eats away at your very soul". Brian Coney of The Line of Best Fit gave the album 9/10 commenting "Running parallel with Aster's allegorical fetishism of interpersonal decay, Krlic's music - even at its most choking and hopeless - feels luminous, making for a perfectly-poised accompaniment to one of the most challenging genre films in recent years." David Sackllah of Consequence commented "Krlic's score continues the trend of engrossing compositions by experimental musicians accompanying some of the most daring movies in recent years, slotting nicely alongside works like Levi's, Stetson's, or Daniel Lopatin's already classic score for 2017's Good Time. Critics have debated about the originality and effectiveness of the film, but Krlic's score stands out as one of the most striking features, perfectly calibrated to portray the sense of enrapture that the film strives for. From the chaotic opening to the cathartic ending, Krlic's score works wonders, while engrossing enough to stand on its own outside of the film as well." Heather Phares of AllMusic wrote "Midsommar's shadows would be nothing without its sunshine, and its balance of beauty and terror is an impressive achievement for both Aster and Krlic".

Lara C. Cory of The Quietus wrote "For Midsommar, Krlic and Aster turn their backs on the more obvious traditional elements typical of the folk horror genre, embracing instead a lighter touch; a more dramatic, dreamy orchestral sound which takes cues from old Disney films and the sentimental, easy-listening arrangements of Sinatra that might trigger a new generation's sense of nostalgia and comfort." Margaret Farrell of Pitchfork wrote "At first, Krlic's soundtrack captures the instinctive panic that comes with the upset of environmental and cultural norms. But as Aster's characters grow acclimated to their new surroundings, he relieves us with symphonic moments of clarity and triumph. In life or death, none of these emotions are exclusive, and Krlic's work continually reminds us that it's all one tremendous grey area." Andrew Ryce of Resident Advisor wrote "the Midsommar score is a sometimes brilliant but limited affair that showcases both Krlic's genius and how that genius suffers under the constraints of a film".

Richie Corelli of Horror DNA wrote "Listeners who aren't concerned with design and just want to spin the record will have something else to consider: This music is so tied to the film that it is a different experience without it. As the movie plays, the score effortlessly steers through the story, massaging the listener to ease and then betraying that comfort. Without the movie, the sounds feel jarring. This is especially true when certain songs blast changes in volume. The work is unpredictable, unstable, and altogether unnerving. Some listeners will appreciate the suspense. Others may be scared away." Music critic Jonathan Broxton wrote "Contrary to all expectation, Midsommar makes for a quite fascinating film score, which suits the film absolutely perfectly, and makes for a challenging but engrossing listen".

== Accolades ==
Award	Date of ceremony	Category	Recipient(s)	Result	Ref(s)
Fangoria Chainsaw Awards	January 6, 2020	Best Score	Bobby Krlic	Won	
International Film Music Critics Association	January 9, 2020	Best Original Score for a Fantasy/Science Fiction/Horror Film	Bobby Krlic	Nominated	
Ivor Novello Awards	September 2, 2020	Best Original Score	Bobby Krlic	Won	
