= Everything Is Never Enough =

Single by Goldfrapp

from the album Silver Eye
- Released: 22 September 2017
- Genre: Synth-pop; new wave
- Length: 5:06
- Label: Mute
- Songwriter(s): Alison Goldfrapp; William Owen Gregory
- Producer(s): Alison Goldfrapp; William Owen Gregory; Andy Savours (add.)

Goldfrapp singles chronology
"Systemagic" (2017)	"Everything Is Never Enough" (2017)	"Ocean" (2018)

"Everything Is Never Enough" is a song performed by English group Goldfrapp, taken from their seventh studio album, Silver Eye (2017). It was released as the album's third single on 22 September 2017 by Mute Records. The song was written and produced by Alison Goldfrapp and William Owen Gregory, with additional production coming from Andy Savours. The song's lyrics encourage the listener to live in the present instead of the future. Critics drew comparisons between "Everything Is Never Enough" and Goldfrapp's prior work on their album Head First (2010).

An accompanying music video for "Everything Is Never Enough" was released on 7 September 2017 and features lead singer Alison Goldfrapp and a nude male dancer performing in a desert setting. It serves as a continuation to the ones for prior singles "Anymore" and "Systemagic".

== Background and release ==
The radio edit (also known as the "video mix") of "Everything Is Never Enough" was released digitally as third single from Silver Eye on 22 September 2017. It was written and produced by members Alison Goldfrapp and William Owen Gregory with Andy Savours serving as an additional producer.

A remix of "Everything Is Never Enough" produced by German DJ Chris Liebing was distributed to digital retailers on 6 October 2017 and titled "Chris Liebing Burn Slow Remix".

== Composition and lyrics ==
"Everything Is Never Enough" has a duration of five minutes and six seconds, whereas the radio edit runs for three minutes and fifty seconds. Sean T. Collins from Pitchfork compared the single to the songs on Goldfrapp's fifth studio album, Head First (2010). Additionally, he claimed that songs like "Everything Is Never Enough" add individuality to the album as they "avoid the genre-pastiche of their counterparts" on Silver Eye.

The lyrics of "Everything Is Never Enough" describe living in the present instead of waiting for the future; Goldfrapp sings "Living like there's no tomorrow / We are here in the future past".

== Critical reception ==
A group of critics from PopMatters reviewed the recording in their "Singles Going Steady" column, with the site's consensus reading: "Goldfrapp expertly balances crisp sound quality and computer-softened vocals for a dreamy club feel and that makes the wasteland seem like a happening place." Ian Rushbury from the publication called the song "lovely" while Adriana Pontecorvo appreciated the "incredibly catchy dance beat". Chris Gerard, also from PopMatters, stated that the single "takes us back to more traditional Goldfrapp territory" and is an obvious candidate to be released as a commercial single.

== Music video ==
A music video for "Everything Is Never Enough" was released on 7 September 2017. Stylistically, it serves as a continuation to the music videos for "Anymore" and "Systemagic", the first two singles from Silver Eye. Tristan Kneschke from PopMatters compared to scenery in the music video to the one for Gary Numan's 2017 single "My Name Is Ruin".

== Track listing and formats ==
CD single / digital download
No.	Title	Length
1.	"Everything Is Never Enough" (Radio Edit)	3:50

Remix digital download
No.	Title	Length
1.	"Everything Is Never Enough" (Chris Liebing Burn Slow Remix)	6:58
