= Ocean (Goldfrapp song) =

2018 song by Goldfrapp

Promotional single by Goldfrapp

from the album Silver Eye
- Released: 10 March 2017
- Genre: Electronic; synth-rock
- Length: 4:26
- Label: Mute
- Songwriter(s): Alison Goldfrapp; William Owen Gregory
- Producer(s): Alison Goldfrapp; William Owen Gregory; The Haxan Cloak (co-producer); John Congleton (add.)

"Ocean" is a song by English group Goldfrapp from their seventh studio album Silver Eye (2017). It was released as the album's first promotional single on 10 March 2017 through Mute Records. The song was written and produced by Alison Goldfrapp and William Owen Gregory, with additional production coming from The Haxan Cloak and John Congleton. An electronic and synth-rock song, "Ocean" marks the return of Goldfrapp's heavy use of synths in their music. Written in couplets, the lyrics were described as dark by several commentators. Critics also drew comparisons between "Ocean" and the works of other musicians and groups, such as Shirley Manson, Nine Inch Nails, and Depeche Mode.

The song generated positive feedback from music critics, with most of them acclaiming it for being emotional and dramatic. Others noted that "Ocean" served as a strong album closer to Silver Eye. A remix of "Ocean" was released on 21 May 2018 as the fourth single from Silver Eye and the first from the deluxe edition reissue of the album. It features guest vocals from Depeche Mode frontman Dave Gahan. A music video for this version of "Ocean" was also released and serves as a continuation to prior music videos created for Silver Eye.

== Background and release ==
"Ocean" was the first of two promotional singles to be released from Silver Eye, with the other being "Moon in Your Mouth" which was released two weeks later; the song was distributed to digital retailers on 10 March 2017 through Mute Records following its initial debut on Billboard's official website. It was written and produced by members Alison Goldfrapp and William Owen Gregory with The Haxan Cloak and John Congleton serving as additional producers. While creating material for Silver Eye, the duo had trouble writing songs that they actually enjoyed; Goldfrapp claimed that "it always takes about three months to write all the rubbish out of your system before you get something you like". Along with the announcement of "Ocean" as a promotional single, tickets for a promotional tour for Silver Eye were made available for purchase, with show legs in Europe and the United States.

== Composition and lyrics ==
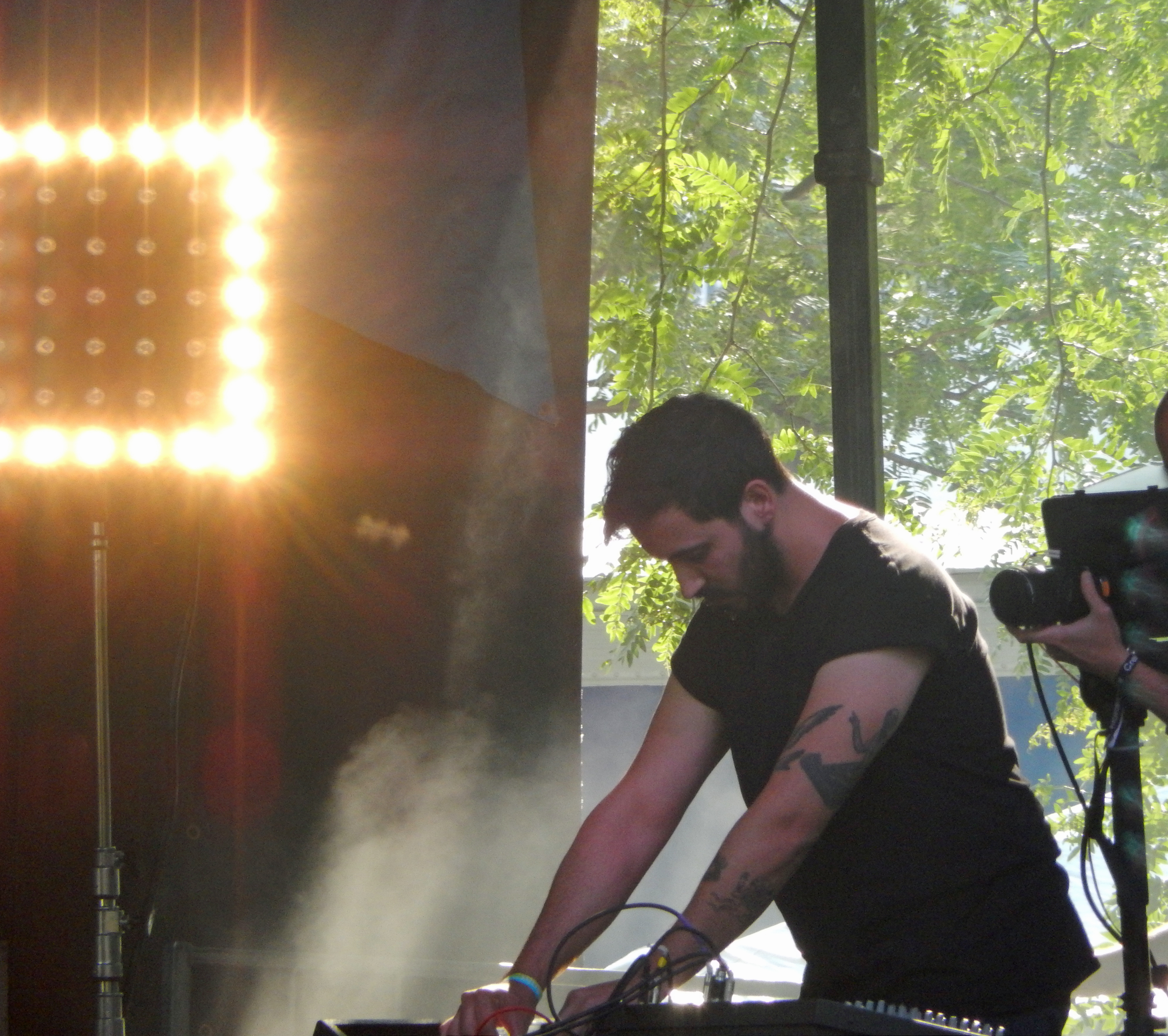
The two additional producers on "Ocean" are The Haxan Cloak (left) and John Congleton (right).

Speaking on behalf of its sound, Gary Graff from Billboard compared the electronic sound in "Ocean" to Goldfrapp's previous albums Black Cherry (2003) and Supernature (2005). Additionally, he felt that the track is unlike their previous release, Tales of Us (2013), in that it does not contain a "pastoral" sound. Instead, the track contains "heavy electronic beats" and an emphasis on "pulse-pounding synths". Both Goldfrapp and Gregory acknowledged the return to using synths in their music, with the former claiming that it created a "tougher sound" to the track overall. Categorizing the genre of the song as synth-rock, Alexa Camp from Slant Magazine claimed that she could picture Shirley Manson singing the lyrics to "Ocean". Referring to its sound as "dark" and "churning", Spin's Anna Gaca noted the "pounding industrial core and [the] faintly sinister processing effect applied to [her] vocals". Labelling the track as a ballad, Sean T. Collins from Pitchfork declared it the cri de coeur on Silver Eye. He further explained that the lyrics contain imagery depicting nature and that the composition uses "big, echoey washes of sound" in order to produce an "enveloping, absorbing, and suffocating" sound.

In a series of couplets, Goldfrapp sings "I borrowed bones, I borrowed skin / To save me from the hell I'm in, your fantasy / And every time I think of you / I see the dark, I hear their hooves", which registers a theme of transformation, according to Chris White from musicOMH. Towards the song's end, she repeats "they're coming for you" in a "reedy and distorted" voice. The track's sound was compared to the works of Depeche Mode and Nine Inch Nails by David Chiu of Consequence of Sound. Furthermore, Chris Gerard, a writer for PopMatters, compared the production's sound to being intoxicated.

== Critical reception ==
"Ocean" generally received praise from contemporary music critics. Heather Phares from AllMusic applauded its role as the closing track on Silver Eye for containing "operatic drama" and an "industrial crunch". Similarly, Anna Gaca from Spin found it necessary for "Ocean" to be the album's final track; she wrote that it "is so heavy and foreboding that is practically has to end the album, for fear of sinking it if were it to appear any earlier in the sequence". Additionally, Gaca claimed that the listener could decipher the outside collaborators that contributed to both "Ocean" and album track "Zodiac Black". Calling it a "rather dramatic close" on the album, Chiu from Consequence of Sound speculated that it may be Goldfrapp's "heaviest and most emotional song" from their recently recorded material. Listing "Ocean" as an example, The Guardian's Alexis Petridis said that the Haxan Cloak's production on several tracks on Silver Eye seemed like a "conscious attempt to meld the two polarities of Goldfrapp's sound". Because of this, she thought that the song "prickle[d] with chilly malevolence". Olivia Riggio, a writer for The Ithacan, complimented Goldfrapp's vocals and the "ominous and powerful" lyrics; she stated that the song should in fact "be called 'Odyssey' because it is an epic". However, Sam Steiger of Hot Press was more negative to the song, stating that although it's interesting, "overall the sensation is of treading water".

== Single version ==
"Ocean"

Single by Goldfrapp featuring Dave Gahan

from the album Silver Eye
- Released: 21 May 2018
- Genre: Electropop
- Length: 4:02
- Label: Mute
- Songwriter(s): Alison Goldfrapp; William Owen Gregory
- Producer(s): Alison Goldfrapp; William Owen Gregory; The Haxan Cloak (co-producer); John Congleton (add.)

Goldfrapp singles chronology
"Everything Is Never Enough" (2017)	"Ocean" (2018)

Dave Gahan singles chronology
"Where I Wait" (2017)	"Ocean" (2018)	"Metal Heart" (2021)

A remix of "Ocean" featuring guest vocals from English musician Dave Gahan was released as a digital download on 21 May 2018. It is included on the deluxe edition reissue of Silver Eye, which was released on 6 July 2018; the remix was released simultaneously with the pre-order for the album. Regarding the collaboration, the group issued a statement: "Working with Dave Gahan on the new version of 'Ocean' had been a real honor for us as a band." A promotional CD single of "Ocean" was also released in a limited distribution by Mute Records.

Kory Grow from Rolling Stone noted how Gahan's baritone vocals "add[ed] a little warmth to the choruses". Noting influence from synthpop, Stereogum's Tom Breihan compared the remix to the works of Gahan's band Depeche Mode, particularly songs from the group's seventh studio album, Violator (1990).

The remix received mostly positive reviews from music critics. Lauren O'Neill from Noisey wrote in her article that the remix was "the sort of collab that should have happened much sooner". She went on to say that the Goldfrapp and Depeche Mode seem to have chemistry, musically, which made the remix successful. One year later, Kaye wrote an extended review of the new version: "Unsurprisingly, Gahan slips in comfortably, sitting in between the pounding electronics and Alison Goldfrapp’s own vocals like he was always meant to be there."

=== Music video ===
A music video for the remix of "Ocean" was also released on 21 May 2018. It was directed by Alison Goldfrapp and serves as an extension to the various music videos created for Silver Eye, including previous singles "Anymore" and "Everything Is Never Enough". Like the aforementioned videos, the shots of Goldfrapp singing were filmed in Fuerteventura. She appears in a dress and veil while "slow-motion scenes of horses appear" are shown as Gahan sings. He filmed his parts while touring with Depeche Mode in Madrid.

== Track listing and formats ==
Digital download
No.	Title	Length
1.	"Ocean"	4:26

CD single / digital download
No.	Title	Length
1.	"Ocean" (featuring Dave Gahan)	4:02
