= Eddington (soundtrack) =

Eddington (Original Soundtrack)

Film score by Bobby Krlic and Daniel Pemberton
- Released: July 18, 2025
- Genre: Film score
- Length: 67:05
- Label: A24 Music
- Producer: Bobby Krlic; Daniel Pemberton

Bobby Krlic chronology
Blue Beetle (2023)	Eddington (2025)	Eenie Meanie (2025)

Daniel Pemberton chronology
Materialists (2025)	Eddington (2025)	The Bad Guys 2 (2025)

Eddington (Original Soundtrack) is the film score composed by Bobby Krlic and Daniel Pemberton to the 2025 neo-Western black comedy thriller film Eddington directed by Ari Aster. The score was released under the A24 Music label on July 18, 2025.

== Background ==
In April 2025, it was announced that Bobby Krlic would compose the musical score for Eddington, after having previously collaborated with Aster on Midsommar (2019) and Beau Is Afraid (2023). Later, that following month, Daniel Pemberton joined as the co-composer. Pemberton and Krlic experimented on Western and Americana music to create the soundscape for Eddington. Krlic researched extensively for the film's music, playing unique and specific instruments that suited the soundscape.

The score is performed by the Chamber Orchestra of London conducted and orchestrated by Samuel Read. Thomas Kotcheff provided additional music while Jillian Ellis served as the music supervisor.

== Release ==
The soundtrack was released through A24 Music on July 18, 2025.

== Track listing ==
No.	Title	Music	Length
1.	"Eddington" (Opening)	Daniel Pemberton	1:45
2.	"City Limits"	Pemberton; Bobby Krlic	0:47
3.	"Disturbing the Peace"	Pemberton; Krlic	2:07
4.	"You Need a Mask"	Pemberton	2:24
5.	"Slogan Ideas"	Krlic	2:10
6.	"Ted and Joe Standoff"	Krlic	2:15
7.	"Dirt Track"	Pemberton	2:23
8.	"Take Back Your Mind"	Pemberton; Krlic	1:31
9.	"Zoom Session"	Krlic	1:16
10.	"Joe Cross for Mayor"	Pemberton; Krlic	2:08
11.	"Not a Here Problem"	Pemberton; Krlic	1:33
12.	"Seeds of Protest"	Pemberton	2:27
13.	"No Justice No Peace"	Pemberton; Krlic	5:09
14.	"Photo Message"	Krlic	1:27
15.	"Leaves"	Pemberton; Krlic	2:00
16.	"Santa Lupe Crime Scene"	Pemberton; Krlic	3:11
17.	"Here Comes the Cure"	Krlic	2:45
18.	"Sevilla County Observer"	Krlic	3:29
19.	"Third Party, No Conflict"	Pemberton; Krlic	2:31
20.	"Butterfly Pursuit"	Pemberton	8:02
21.	"No Peace"	Pemberton; Krlic	3:34
22.	"We Draw Guns"	Pemberton; Krlic	3:15
23.	"Eddington" (Ending)	Pemberton	2:59
24.	"Joe Home" (Ending) (Alt Version)	Krlic	2:59
25.	"Bedtime"	Krlic	1:00
26.	"Solidgoldmagikarp"	Pemberton	1:58
Total length:			67:05

== Reception ==
David Ehrlich of IndieWire noted the score was influenced by the writing of Japanese composer Tōru Takemitsu and takes advantage of the events happening in the film. David Rooney of The Hollywood Reporter wrote "Bobby Krlic and Daniel Pemberton's ominous score is a good match for the needling quality shared by all four of Aster's features." Tim Grierson of Screen International called it an "anxiety-inducing score". Amy Nicholson of Los Angeles Times described it "a humming, whining score".

Emma Kiely of Collider wrote "The score from Aster"s frequent go-to, Bobby Krlic, and Daniel Pemberton adds to the crime-thriller ambiance, with a low residual bass that reminds you that this is an Aster film, and nothing is ever as it seems." Stephanie Zacharek of Time wrote: "the movie"s score, by the Haxan Cloak and Daniel Pemberton, is wonderful: there are sweeping passages of Elmer Bernstein-like jauntiness." Damon Wise of Deadline Hollywood noted that the film is "scored with a suitably Western sting courtesy of composer[s] Daniel Pemberton [and Bobby Krlic]".

== Additional music ==
The following songs are not included in the soundtrack:

- TOPS – "Alive"
- Tender Leaf – "You Are My Love"
- Katie McGhie – "Home"
- Sophiya – "Rosie"
- Dunni – "Ha Ha"
- Anike, Whatuprg, nobigdyl – "Been Up"
- Neahe Ashain – "I Got One"
- Katy Perry – "Firework"
- Tom Grennan – "Little Bit of Love"
- Bobbie Gentry – "Courtyard"
