= Hårgalåten =

Swedish folk song

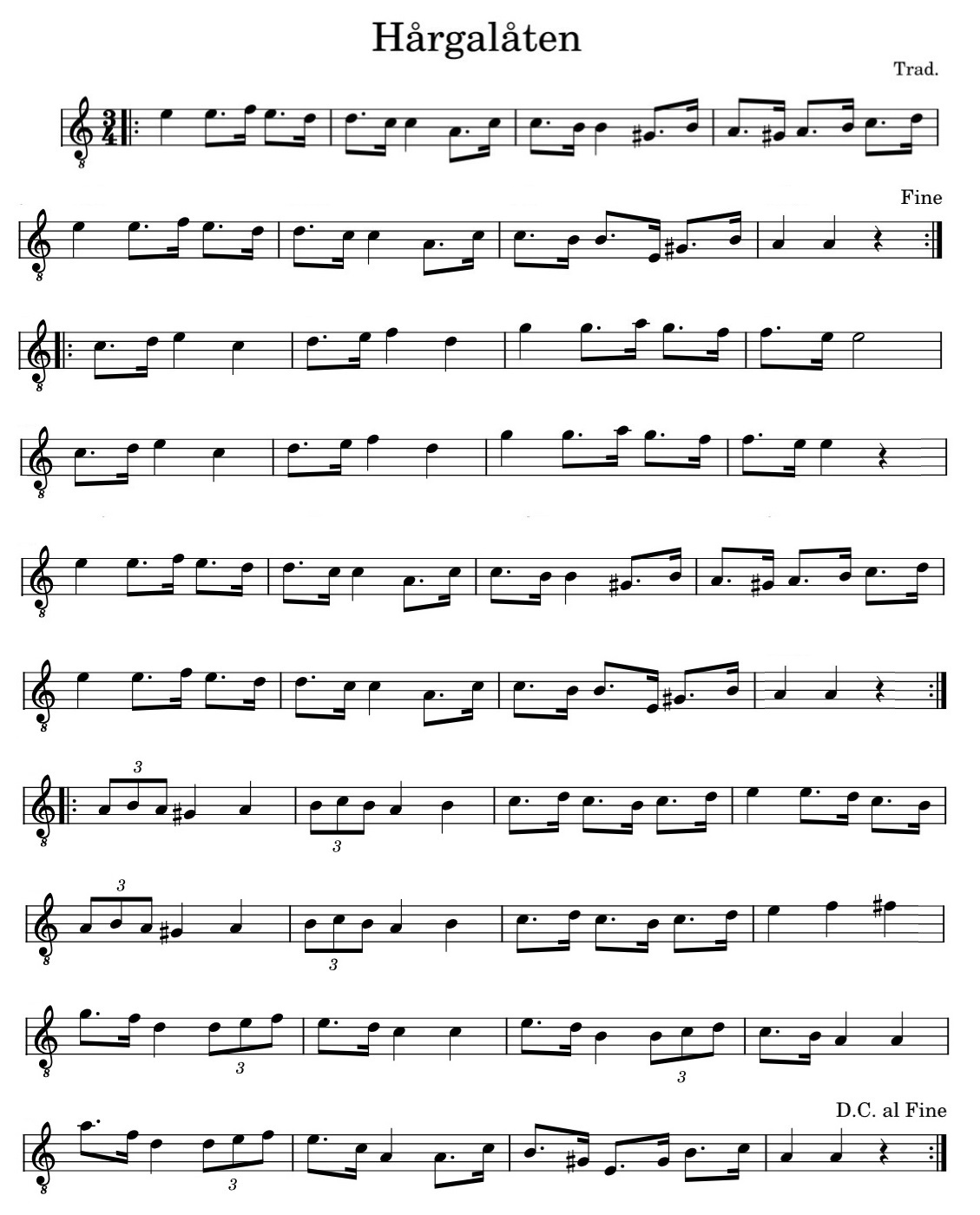
Hårgalåten

"Hårgalåten", or the "Harga song", is a Swedish folk song. The song is connected to a 1785 story published by Johan Gabriel Lindström. The song describes how a mysterious fiddler came to the community near Hårgaberget or "Harga mountain", and played the fiddle. The youth danced to the tune that the fiddler played and they were unable to stop. Some of the youth noticed a cloven hoof, leading them to believe the fiddler was demonic. Even as morning came, the adults noticed they were all still dancing, and the fiddler still fiddling. Later, the dancers started dropping dead from exhaustion.

== In popular culture ==
The myth is referenced in the Swedish-American folk horror film Midsommar.

== See also ==
- Dancing mania
