= Baby Rose =

American singer, songwriter, and composer (born 1994)

- Born: Jasmine Rose Wilson; Washington, D.C., U.S.
- Origin: Fayetteville, North Carolina, U.S.
- Genre: Neo soul
- Occupations: Singer; songwriter
- Instruments: Vocals; piano
- Years active: 2017–present
- Labels: Secretly Canadian; Island Records (former)

Jasmine Rose Wilson, known professionally as Baby Rose, is an American singer.

== Early life ==
Jasmine Rose Wilson was born in Washington, D.C., and moved to Fayetteville, North Carolina at age 11. She began playing the piano and recording music at age nine. While attending E.E. Smith High School in Fayetteville, North Carolina, Wilson was discovered by manager and Blackstarr Entertainment CEO Terry Flowers, who began managing her after overhearing her singing and playing piano. In May 2010, under the stage name Jasmine Rose, she received her first national exposure when she was featured as a Spotlight Artist on BET's 106 & Park.She moved to Atlanta to study sociology at Spelman College.

== Career ==
She released her mixtape From Dusk 'til Dawn in 2017, which received co-signs from artists including SZA and Kehlani. In 2019, she was featured on projects like Matt Martian's The Last Party, Big K.R.I.T.'s K.R.I.T. Iz Here, and Dreamville's Revenge of the Dreamers III compilation. In 2019, she went on the Shea Butter Baby tour with Ari Lennox.

She released her debut album To Myself on August 22, 2019, which was distributed by Human Re Sources. She toured in the United States and Europe in support of the album. On May 31, 2020, a remix of her song "Show You" was featured on Episode 8, "Lowkey Happy", of the fourth season of HBO's Insecure. She released her Golden Hour EP in July 2020. In September 2020, the deluxe version of To Myself was released by Island Records. Following the release, she was dropped by Island Records and signed to independent label Secretly Canadian. During the COVID-19 pandemic, she studied online at the Berklee College of Music.

In April 2023, Rose released her second studio album, Through and Through, via Secretly Canadian. The record received critical acclaim. To support the album, Rose embarked on a headlining tour across the United States, performing at venues such as the Troubadour in Los Angeles and Bowery Ballroom in New York City. She performed the closing track "Heavy Is the Head" on the 2023 soundtrack for Creed III, released by Dreamville and Interscope. The following year, she collaborated with Canadian band BadBadNotGood on the EP Slow Burn, released in April 2024. The project received critical acclaim for themes. She subsequently toured domestically with BadBadNotGood, before joining Vince Staples on his Black in America Tour. She made her on-screen debut in the 2025 film Materialists, appearing as a wedding singer, and contributed the songs "I'll Be Your Mirror" and "That's All" to the film's soundtrack, both released on June 13, 2025. Rose embarked on a West Coast tour in the autumn of 2025. Her album Yearnalism was released on July 10, 2026. Rose supported Olivia Dean's 2026 The Art of Loving Live tour in the United States.

== Discography ==
=== Albums ===
Title	Details
To Myself	Released: August 22, 2019; Format: Digital download; Label: Human Re Sources; Island Records (deluxe version)
Through and Through	Released: April 28, 2023; Format: Digital download, CD, LP; Label: Secretly Canadian
Yearnalism	Released: July 10, 2026; Format: Digital download; Label: Secretly Canadian

=== Mixtapes ===
Title	Details
From Dusk 'Til Dawn	Released: July 24, 2017; Format: Digital download

=== Extended plays ===
- J Dilla x Baby Rose (2016)
- To: You (2019)
- Golden Hour (2020)
- Slow Burn (2024) with BadBadNotGood

=== Guest appearances ===
List of non-single guest appearances, with other performing artists, showing year released and album name
Title	Year	Other artist(s)	Album
"Out the Game"	2019	Matt Martians	The Last Party
"Self Love"	2019	Ari Lennox, Bas	Revenge of the Dreamers III
"Everytime"	2019	Big K.R.I.T.	K.R.I.T. Iz Here
"Expectations"	2020	Robert Glasper, Rapsody	Fuck Yo Feelings
"Heavy Is the Head"	2023	Dreamville	Creed III: The Soundtrack
"Shame On The Devil"	2024	Vince Staples	Dark Times
"I Used To"	2024	Leon Thomas	Mutt
"Karma Plays"	2024	Chris McClenney	Non-album single
"Rolling Thunder"	2024	Jamie Jones	Sound of Thunder
"Complex of Killing a Man"	2024	BLK Odyssy	Diamonds & Freaks
"That's All"	2025	Daniel Pemberton	Materialists (soundtrack)
"I'll Be Your Mirror"	2025	Daniel Pemberton	Materialists (soundtrack)
"Stand for Something"	2026	Dahi, Ant Clemons, Jesse Boykins III	Black Boy (Alternative)

== Filmography ==
- Materialists (2025)
