= Silver Eye =

Studio album by Goldfrapp
- Released: 31 March 2017
- Recorded: 2015–2016 (Dallas, Texas), (London, England)
- Genre: Electroclash; synth-rock
- Length: 44:49
- Label: Mute
- Producer: Goldfrapp

Goldfrapp chronology
Tales of Us (2013)	Silver Eye (2017)

Singles from Silver Eye
- 1. "Anymore" Released: 23 January 2017; 2. "Systemagic" Released: 12 May 2017; 3. "Everything Is Never Enough" Released: 7 September 2017; 4. "Ocean" Released: 21 May 2018

Silver Eye is the seventh and final studio album by English electronic music duo Goldfrapp, released on 31 March 2017 by Mute Records. The album's first single, "Anymore", was released to digital music retailers on 23 January 2017 after its premiere on Lauren Laverne's BBC Radio 6 show.

== Background and release ==
In July 2015, Alison Goldfrapp announced on Twitter that the group had returned to the studio to work on music for the forthcoming seventh album, but was mum as to a release date, stating she could only generalize it to be "sometime in 2017". This came after finishing their tour to promote their last album, Tales of Us, and scoring a Royal National Theatre production of Medea. Goldfrapp noted their desire to do something different from previous albums Supernature and Head First, eventually bringing in John Congleton (Blondie, St Vincent, Swans) and The Haxan Cloak to produce on the strength of his work on Björk's 2015 album Vulnicura.

In early December 2016, Goldfrapp posted on their Instagram page the covers of their first six studio albums, and later that month, the band posted an image of two topless figures with bleached blonde hair holding each other's heads with arms slicked with a black, oil-like substance. The social media upload contained the hashtag #goldfrapp7, implying it was a piece born from the album's creative and marketing campaign. The title of the album, Silver Eye, was accidentally leaked with the posting of a pre-order link on the HMV website on 21 January 2017, and was later confirmed in a press release by the band on 23 January.

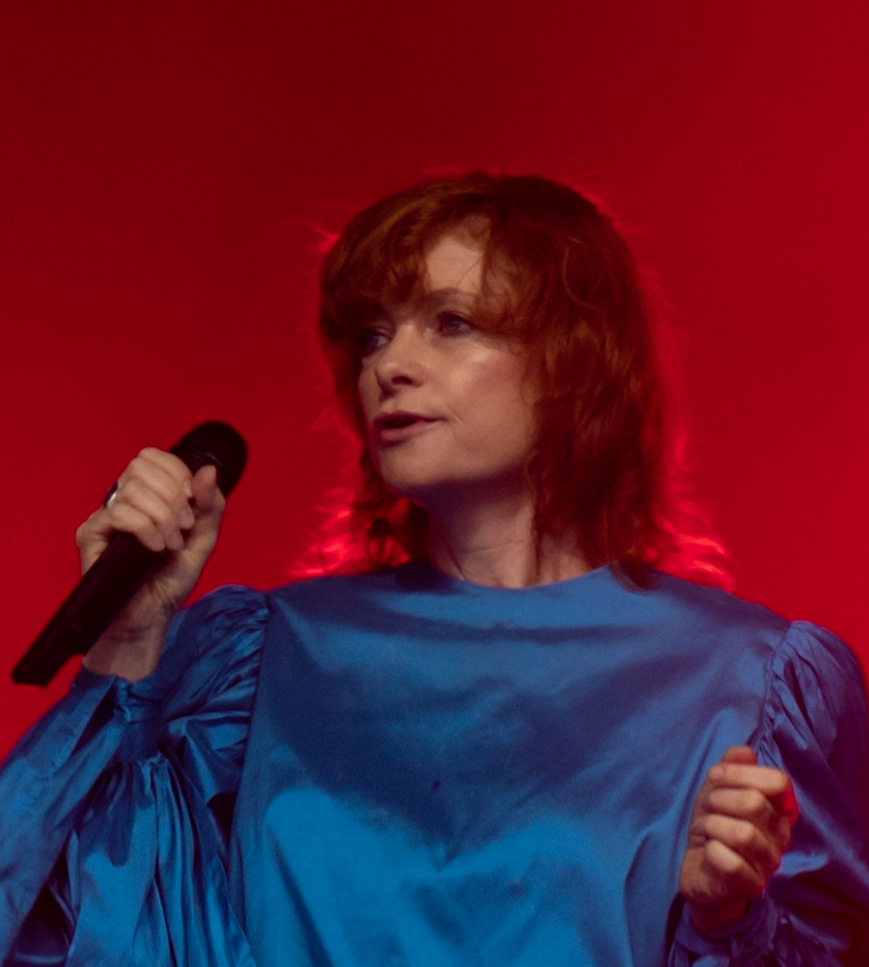
Goldfrapp performing in July 2018

The press release also announced the release of the album's opening track, "Anymore", as the album's lead single. Released on 9 February, the official music video for "Anymore" was directed by Alison Goldfrapp, produced by Mary Calderwood, and filmed in Fuerteventura. Two further tracks were released ahead of the album. On 9 March 2017, Goldfrapp premiered the album's closing track, "Ocean", through Billboard and released to digital music retailers on 10 March. "Moon in Your Mouth" was released on 24 March 2017.

The music video for the second single "Systemagic" premiered on 24 April 2017. The music video for the third single "Everything Is Never Enough" premiered on Nowness on 7 September 2017.

On 19 May 2018 it was announced on the band's social media pages that an announcement and video were to be unveiled over the weekend. On May 21, 2018, a remix of "Ocean" featuring Dave Gahan was released worldwide, along with the news that it would be the lead single from a deluxe edition of Silver Eye.

== Critical reception ==
Professional ratings
Aggregate scores
Source	Rating
AnyDecentMusic?	6.8/10
Metacritic	74/100
Review scores
Source	Rating
AllMusic	4/5 stars
The A.V. Club	C+
Clash	7/10
Consequence of Sound	B+
DIY	4/5 stars
Mixmag	7/10
musicOMH	4/5 stars
Pitchfork	7.4/10
Record Collector	4/5 stars
Under the Radar	7.5/10 stars

Silver Eye received generally positive reviews from music critics. At Metacritic, which assigns a weighted mean rating out of 100 to reviews from mainstream critics, the album received an average score of 74, based on 21 reviews.

== Commercial performance ==
Silver Eye debuted at number six on the UK Albums Chart, selling 11,733 copies in its first week.

== Track listing ==
All tracks are written by Alison Goldfrapp and Will Gregory, except where noted.

No.	Title	Writer(s)	Producer(s)	Length
1.	"Anymore"		Goldfrapp; Gregory; The Haxan Cloak^{[a]}; John Congleton^{[a]}	3:54
2.	"Systemagic"		Goldfrapp; Gregory; Congleton^{[b]}	3:38
3.	"Tigerman"		Goldfrapp; Gregory; The Haxan Cloak^{[a]}; Congleton^{[a]}	4:14
4.	"Become the One"		Goldfrapp; Gregory; The Haxan Cloak^{[a]}; Congleton^{[a]}	4:44
5.	"Faux Suede Drifter"	Goldfrapp; Gregory; Bobby Krlic	Goldfrapp; Gregory; The Haxan Cloak^{[b]}	5:02
6.	"Zodiac Black"		Goldfrapp; Gregory; The Haxan Cloak^{[b]}	5:04
7.	"Beast That Never Was"		Goldfrapp; Gregory; Leo Abrahams^{[a]}	4:38
8.	"Everything Is Never Enough"		Goldfrapp; Gregory; Andy Savours^{[a]}	5:06
9.	"Moon in Your Mouth"		Goldfrapp; Gregory; The Haxan Cloak^{[a]}; Congleton^{[a]}	4:03
10.	"Ocean"		Goldfrapp; Gregory; The Haxan Cloak^{[b]}; Congleton^{[b]}	4:26
Total length:				44:49

Japanese edition bonus track
No.	Title	Length
11.	"Anymore" (Joe Goddard remix)	6:14
Total length:		51:03

Deluxe edition bonus tracks
No.	Title	Length
1.	"Ocean" (feat. Dave Gahan)	4:02
2.	"Anymore" (Will Gregory's Don't Stop Now Remix)	7:25
3.	"Everything Is Never Enough" (Video Mix)	3:50
4.	"Anymore" (Joe Goddard Remix)	6:13
5.	"Systemagic" (Ralphi Rosario Lunar Eclipse Mix)	6:58
6.	"Anymore" (Whatever/Whatever Remix by Justin Strauss & Bryan Mette)	7:54
7.	"Everything Is Never Enough" (Chris Liebing Burn Slow Remix)	7:00
8.	"Anymore" (Ralphi Rosario Tek Vocal Mix)	7:00

=== Notes ===
- ^{^[a]} signifies an additional producer
- ^{^[b]} signifies a co-producer

== Personnel ==
Credits adapted from the liner notes of Silver Eye.

=== Goldfrapp ===
- Alison Goldfrapp – vocals, instruments
- Will Gregory – instruments

=== Additional musicians ===
- Andy Savours – programming (track 8)
- David Wrench – additional programming
- John Congleton – additional drum programming (tracks 8, 10)
- Nick Batt – additional drum programming (tracks 1, 8)
- Charlie Jones – bass guitar (tracks 5, 8)
- Sebastian Sternberg – live drum loops (tracks 1–3, 9)
- Robert Brian – drums (track 8)
- Leo Abrahams – guitar (tracks 5, 7)

=== Technical personnel ===
- Goldfrapp – production, engineering
- The Haxan Cloak – co-production (tracks 5, 6, 10); additional production (tracks 1, 3, 4, 9)
- John Congleton – co-production (tracks 2, 10); additional production (tracks 1, 3, 4, 9)
- Leo Abrahams – additional production (track 7)
- Andy Savours – additional production (track 8)
- David Wrench – mixing
- Marta Salogni – mix engineering
- Sebastian Sternberg – live drum loops recording (tracks 1–3, 9)
- Mark Frith – drum recording (track 8)
- Iain Berryman – additional engineering
- Alessandro Baldessari – additional engineering
- Pete Hutchings – additional engineering
- Marco Migliari – additional engineering
- Ted Jensen – mastering at Sterling Sound, New York City (tracks 1, 3–8)
- Matt Colton – mastering at Alchemy, London (tracks 2, 9, 10)

=== Artwork ===
- Alison Goldfrapp – art direction, photography
- Mat Maitland – album design

== Charts ==
Chart (2017)	Peak position
Australian Albums (ARIA)	20
Austrian Albums (Ö3 Austria)	27
Belgian Albums (Ultratop Flanders)	25
Belgian Albums (Ultratop Wallonia)	36
Dutch Albums (Album Top 100)	52
French Albums (SNEP)	57
German Albums (Offizielle Top 100)	31
Irish Albums (IRMA)	19
Italian Albums (FIMI)	55
New Zealand Heatseeker Albums (RMNZ)	3
Portuguese Albums (AFP)	29
Scottish Albums (OCC)	5
Spanish Albums (PROMUSICAE)	37
Swiss Albums (Schweizer Hitparade)	24
UK Albums (OCC)	6
US Billboard 200	118
US Independent Albums (Billboard)	8
US Top Alternative Albums (Billboard)	10
US Top Rock Albums (Billboard)	16
