= Systemagic =

Single by Goldfrapp

from the album Silver Eye
- Released: 12 May 2017
- Genre: Disco; electroclash
- Length: 3:38
- Label: Mute
- Songwriters: Alison Goldfrapp; William Owen Gregory
- Producers: Alison Goldfrapp; William Owen Gregory; John Congleton (add.)

Goldfrapp singles chronology
"Anymore" (2017)	"Systemagic" (2017)	"Everything Is Never Enough" (2017)

"Systemagic" is a song performed by English group Goldfrapp, taken from their seventh studio album Silver Eye (2017). It was released as the album's second single on 12 May 2017 by Mute Records. The song was written and produced by Alison Goldfrapp and William Owen Gregory, with additional production coming from John Congleton.

The track was featured in the 2025 action-adventure video game MindsEye.

== Composition ==
"Systemagic" has been described as a disco and electroclash song, in a similar style to their 2003 album Black Cherry and 2005 album Supernature. AllMusic called it a "cybersexy mover" that was "quintessentially Goldfrapp", noting that the track is "untouched by EDM or any other trends".

The track runs for three minutes and 38 seconds, the shortest on the album. The album title 'silver eye' is sung at the end of every verse.

== Music video ==
A music video was released on 24 April 2017.

== Track listing ==
"Systemagic" / "Anymore" (Remixes Pt. 1) digital download

1. "Systemagic" (Hannah Holland Remix) – 7:34
2. "Anymore" (Ralphi Rosario Tek Vocal Mix) – 7:01

"Systemagic" / "Anymore" (Remixes Pt. 2) digital download

1. "Systemagic" (Ralphi Rosario Lunar Eclipse Mix) – 6:58
2. "Anymore" (Whatever/Whatever Remix by Justin Strauss & Bryan Mette) – 7:54

UK promo CD

1. "Systemagic" (Radio Edit 1) – 3:33

UK promo CD

1. "Systemagic" (Radio Edit 2) – 3:38
