= The Haxan Cloak =

British musician (born 1985)

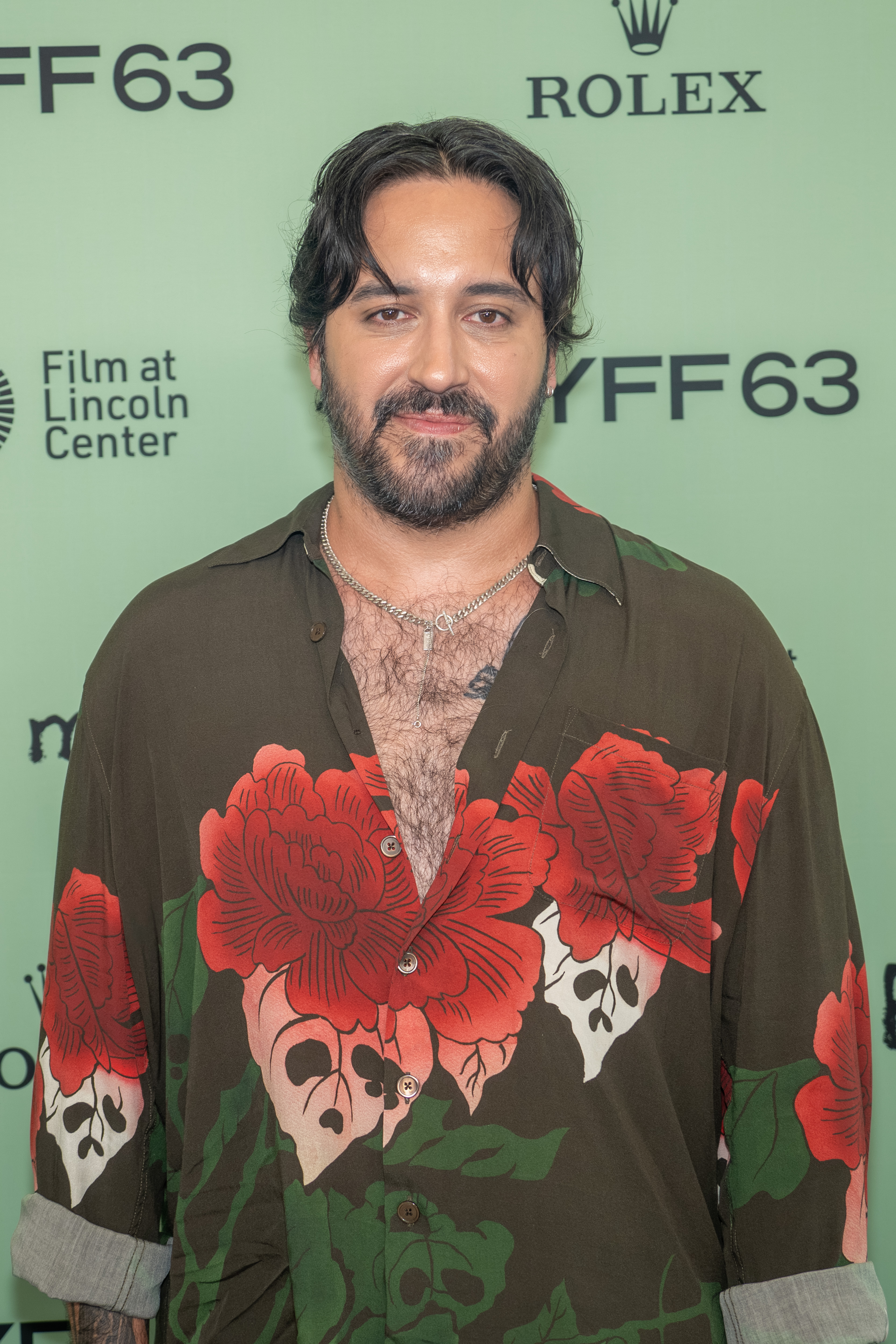
- Krlic in 2025

Background information
- Born: Bobby Milan Krlic; 20 December 1985 (age 40); Wakefield, England
- Genres: Electronica; dark ambient; drone; industrial; experimental; synthwave; EDM; film and television scores
- Occupations: Musician; composer; record producer
- Instruments: Piano; keyboards; synthesizer; guitar; bass guitar
- Years active: 2009–present
- Labels: Archaic Devices; Aurora Borealis; Tri Angle
- Website: thehaxancloak.com

Bobby Milan Krlic (born 20 December 1985), known by his stage name The Haxan Cloak, is a British composer, artist, music producer and musician.

He has released two full-length albums (2011's The Haxan Cloak and 2013's Excavation). As a producer, Krlic has worked with artists including Björk, Father John Misty, Khalid, Troye Sivan, Goldfrapp, serpentwithfeet and The Body. He has also composed several soundtracks, credited under his real name, including Ari Aster's films Midsommar, Beau Is Afraid and Eddington, and the television series Beef, Snowpiercer, Angel of Darkness and Reprisal.

== Early life and education ==
Krlic was born and raised in Wakefield, West Yorkshire, England. He is of Serbian descent. He studied music and visual arts at the University of Brighton.

== Music career ==
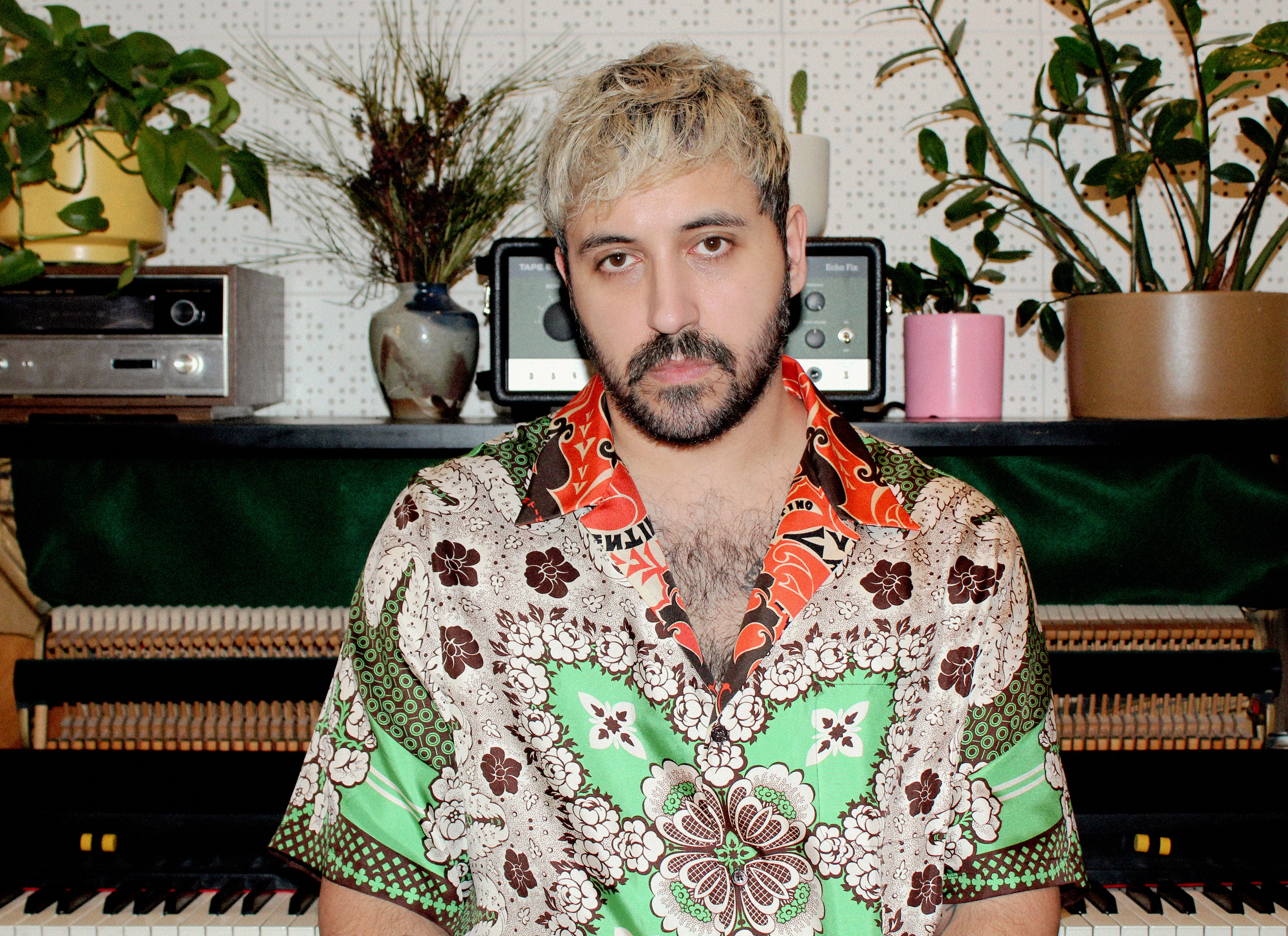
Krlic in 2023

=== The Haxan Cloak releases ===
Krlic's first release as The Haxan Cloak was the Observatory E.P., landing as a cassette via Aurora Borealis on Halloween 2010. A year later, Krlic recorded his first album, The Haxan Cloak, in his parents' shed using strings, mics and a laptop, playing every instrument himself. The second LP, Excavation, was released in 2013, and has a more electronic feel, using samples and heavy bass, along with distorted field recordings made by Krlic.

In 2012, The Haxan Cloak released a limited edition, one track, 27-minute live recording, The Men Parted the Sea to Devour the Water, as a part of Southern Records' Latitudes series.

Krlic has also released remixes of songs by other artists under The Haxan Cloak, including Father John Misty, Foals, and Björk.

=== Production credits ===
In 2014, Krlic teamed up with American sludge metal band The Body to produce their 2014 album I Shall Die Here. In the same year he produced Victim by noise rock band HEALTH.

Krlic also collaborated with Björk as a co-producer on her album Vulnicura, released in January 2015. Since then, he has produced serpentwithfeet's E.P. Blisters, Goldfrapp's 2017 album Silver Eye, Heaven by Khalid from 2019's Free Spirit, and by Troye Sivan's 2018 single Animal. He also produced Father John Misty's cover of Fallin' Rain. and co-produced his 2020 singles To S. / To R.

=== Scoring work ===
Krlic was invited by Academy Award-winning film composer Atticus Ross to work with him on Michael Mann's film Blackhat, which was released in 2015. In 2016, Krlic continued his work with Ross, co-scoring Triple 9, directed by John Hillcoat, and the soundtrack to Almost Holy, a documentary directed by Steve Hoover.

In 2019, Krlic scored Ari Aster's second feature horror film Midsommar, for which Krlic won Best Original Score at the 2020 Ivor Novello Awards. He also scored Ari Aster's following film Beau Is Afraid.

Within television, Krlic has scored a number of major network shows including TNT's Snowpiercer and Angel of Darkness, Hulu's Reprisal Apple's Invasion, and Netflix's Beef and Seven Seconds.

In 2020 he collaborated with Swans on a Halloween Pass of Red Dead Redemption 2 by Rockstar Games. In 2021 he scored PlayStation 5's debut release Returnal.

== Touring ==
In 2014, The Haxan Cloak toured the United States visiting Washington, DC, New York City, Chicago and Los Angeles. He performed at the Brooklyn Masonic Temple along with Robert Henke and his music and light show, Lumière, and in Los Angeles with Pharmakon. The New York Times called The Haxan Cloak's set "amorphous, ominous and immersive, a transcendent plunge into darkness and overwhelming pressure". The Haxan Cloak performed a solo show at Manchester International Festival in 2017. Bobby Krlic also joined Björk on her Vulnicura tour in the U.S. (including The Governor's Ball in New York) and Europe.

== Musical style ==
Krlic's music is almost entirely instrumental, and is often described as dark, carefully constructed, textured and atmospheric, with heavy bass and elements of drone metal. Of his albums, Krlic has said, "The first record was about a person's decline towards death, so this one's about the journey he takes afterwards." The name Haxan Cloak derives from the Swedish "häxan", meaning "the witch".

Excavation was rated a 9 out of 10 by Spin, and an 8.7 out of 10 by Pitchfork, who also named it the 29th-best album of 2013. Rolling Stone named it the 16th-best dance album of 2013.

Midsommar received wide critical praise including a 9/10 from The Line of Best Fit, ranked 2 in Insider's Top 20 Best Movie and TV Soundtracks of The Decade, and critic Glenn Kenny of The New York Times stating that “The remarkable music score by Bobby Krlic aka The Haxan Cloak is also a major contributor to the uncanny feeling the movie creates. Top Stuff."

== Awards ==
- 2019: Midsommar – Nominee, Breakthrough Composer of the Year – International Film Music Critics Association
- 2020: Midsommar — Winner, Best Original Soundtrack – Ivor Novello Awards
- 2022: Returnal – Winner, Outstanding Achievement in Original Music Composition – D.I.C.E. Awards
- 2022: Returnal – Winner, Best Music – BAFTA Games Awards
- 2022: Returnal - Nominee, Best Original Video Game Score - Ivor Novello Awards

== Personal life ==
Krlic moved from London to Los Angeles in 2015. As of 2016, he resides in the Silver Lake area.

== Discography ==
=== Albums ===
Year	Title
2011	The Haxan Cloak: Released: 6 June 2011; Label: Aurora Borealis; Formats: CD, LP, digital download
2013	Excavation: Released: 16 April 2013; Label: Tri Angle; Formats: CD, LP, digital download

=== Extended plays and singles ===
Year	Title
2009	The Haxan Cloak: Released: 24 June 2009; Label: (self-released); Formats: CD-R; Limited edition
2011	Observatory: Released: 11 July 2011; Label: Aurora Borealis; Formats: Cassette, CD, LP, digital download
2012	The Men Parted the Sea to Devour the Water: Released: 31 July 2012; Label: Latitudes; Formats: CD, LP, digital download; Limited edition
2023	N/Y: Released: 11 October 2023; Label: Archaic Devices; Formats: LP, digital download; Limited edition

=== Film soundtracks ===
Year	Film	Artist	Details
2015	Blackhat	Atticus Ross	Programmer
2016	Triple 9	Atticus Ross, Claudia Sarne, Leopold Ross, Bobby Krlic	Composer, engineer, mixer, performer, producer, programmer
2016	Almost Holy	Atticus Ross, Leopold Ross, Bobby Krlic	Performer, composer
2019	Midsommar	Bobby Krlic	Composer
2023	Beau Is Afraid	Bobby Krlic	Composer
2023	Blue Beetle	Bobby Krlic	Composer
2025	Eddington	Bobby Krlic, Daniel Pemberton	Composer
2025	Eenie Meanie	Bobby Krlic	Composer
2025	Him	Bobby Krlic	Composer
2025	Anemone	Bobby Krlic	Composer
2026	The Wrecking Crew	Bobby Krlic	Composer

=== Television and video game soundtracks ===
Year	Project	Artist	Details
2016–2018	Shooter	Bobby Krlic	Composer
2018	Seven Seconds	Bobby Krlic	Composer and music producer
2019	The Alienist: Angel of Darkness	Bobby Krlic	Composer and music producer
2019	Red Dead Redemption 2	Bobby Krlic	Composer and music producer
2019	Reprisal	Bobby Krlic	Composer and music producer
2021–2024	Snowpiercer	Bobby Krlic	Composer and music producer
2021	Calls	Bobby Krlic	Composer and music producer
2021	Returnal	Bobby Krlic	Composer
2022	Paper Girls	Bobby Krlic	Composer
2023	Beef	Bobby Krlic	Composer
2023–2025	Invasion	Bobby Krlic	Composer

=== Songwriting and production credits ===
Title	Year	Artist	Album	Songwriter	Producer			
Title	Year	Artist	Album	Songwriter	Primary	Secondary	Additional	Vocal
"To Carry the Seeds of Death Within In"	2014	The Body	I Shall Die Here		check			
"Alone All the Way"	2014	The Body	I Shall Die Here		check			
"The Night Knows No Dawn"	2014	The Body	I Shall Die Here		check			
"Hail to Thee, Everlasting Pain"	2014	The Body	I Shall Die Here		check			
"Our Souls Were Clean"	2014	The Body	I Shall Die Here		check			
"Darkness Surrounds Us"	2014	The Body	I Shall Die Here		check			
"Like Chrome"	2014	Wife	What's Between		check			
"Tongue"	2014	Wife	What's Between		check			
"Heart is a Far Light"	2014	Wife	What's Between		check			
"Salvage"	2014	Wife	What's Between		check			
"Dans Ce"	2014	Wife	What's Between		check			
"A Nature (Shards)"	2014	Wife	What's Between		check			
"Living Joy"	2014	Wife	What's Between		check			
"Fruit Tree"	2014	Wife	What's Between		check			
"Further Not Better"	2014	Wife	What's Between		check			
"Unites"	2014	Lost Under Heaven	Spiritual Songs for Lovers to Sing		check			
"Family"	2015	Björk	Vulnicura		check			
"Victim"	2015	Health	Death Magic		check			
"I&I"	2016	Lost Under Heaven	Spiritual Songs for Lovers to Sing		check			
"Beneath the Concrete"	2016	Lost Under Heaven	Spiritual Songs for Lovers to Sing		check			
"Future Blues"	2016	Lost Under Heaven	Spiritual Songs for Lovers to Sing		check			
"Someday Come"	2016	Lost Under Heaven	Spiritual Songs for Lovers to Sing		check			
"$oro"	2016	Lost Under Heaven	Spiritual Songs for Lovers to Sing		check			
"Here Our Moment Ends"	2016	Lost Under Heaven	Spiritual Songs for Lovers to Sing		check			
"Loyalty"	2016	Lost Under Heaven	Spiritual Songs for Lovers to Sing		check			
"Lost Under Heaven"	2016	Lost Under Heaven	Spiritual Songs for Lovers to Sing		check			
"First Eye to the New Sky"	2016	Lost Under Heaven	Spiritual Songs for Lovers to Sing		check			
"Lament"	2016	Lost Under Heaven	Spiritual Songs for Lovers to Sing		check			
"The Great Longing"	2016	Lost Under Heaven	Spiritual Songs for Lovers to Sing		check			
"Flickering"	2016	Serpentwithfeet	Blisters EP		check			
"Blisters"	2016	Serpentwithfeet	Blisters EP	check	check			
"Four Ethers"	2016	Serpentwithfeet	Blisters EP		check			
"Penance" (featuring Andre Goldenhuys)	2016	Serpentwithfeet	Blisters EP		check			
"Redemption"	2016	Serpentwithfeet	Blisters EP		check			
"Anymore"	2017	Goldfrapp	Silver Eye				check	
"Tigerman"	2017	Goldfrapp	Silver Eye				check	
"Become the One"	2017	Goldfrapp	Silver Eye				check	
"Faux Suede Drifter"	2017	Goldfrapp	Silver Eye	check		check		
"Zodiac Black"	2017	Goldfrapp	Silver Eye			check		
"Moon in Your Mouth"	2017	Goldfrapp	Silver Eye				check	
"Ocean"	2017	Goldfrapp	Silver Eye			check		
"Animal"	2018	Troye Sivan	Bloom				check	
"Fallin' Rain"	2018	Father John Misty	Non-album single		check			
"Heaven"	2019	Khalid	Free Spirit	check	check			
"Heaven Hunters"	2023	Emile Mosseri	Heaven Hunters		check			
"Oklahoma Baby"	2023	Emile Mosseri	Heaven Hunters		check			
"My Greedy Heart"	2023	Emile Mosseri	Heaven Hunters		check			
"Home For The Summer"	2023	Emile Mosseri	Heaven Hunters		check			
"Some Kind Of Sting"	2023	Emile Mosseri	Heaven Hunters		check			
"All For The Bliss"	2023	Emile Mosseri	Heaven Hunters		check			
"Where The Waters Warm"	2023	Emile Mosseri	Heaven Hunters		check			
"Two Heaven Hunters"	2023	Emile Mosseri	Heaven Hunters		check			
"In The Shadows"	2023	Emile Mosseri	Heaven Hunters		check			
"Rosewater"	2023	Emile Mosseri	Heaven Hunters		check			
