= Materialists (soundtrack) =

Materialists (Original Soundtrack)

Film score by Daniel Pemberton
- Released: June 13, 2025
- Recorded: 2025
- Studio: Angel Recording Studios, London; Zennor Sounds, Cornwall
- Genre: Film score
- Length: 42:00
- Label: A24 Music
- Producer: Daniel Pemberton

Daniel Pemberton chronology
| Fly Me to the Moon (2024) | Materialists (2025) | Eddington (2025) |

Singles from Materialists (Original Motion Picture Soundtrack)
- 1. "My Baby (Got Nothing At All)" Released: June 9, 2025; 2. "I'll Be Your Mirror / That's All" Released: June 13, 2025

Materialists (Original Soundtrack) is the film score to the 2025 film Materialists directed by Celine Song, starring Dakota Johnson, Chris Evans, Zoë Winters, Marin Ireland, Louisa Jacobson, and Pedro Pascal. The original score was composed by Daniel Pemberton and released through Milan Records on June 13, 2025.

== Background and release ==
In March 2025, it was announced that Daniel Pemberton would compose the musical score for Materialists. Japanese Breakfast wrote the song "My Baby (Got Nothing At All)" for the film, which preceded as a single on June 9. Baby Rose also worked on two songs: "I'll Be Your Mirror" and "That's All", which were also released as singles on June 13. The soundtrack was released through A24 Music on June 13, the same day as the film.

== Reception ==
David Rooney of The Hollywood Reporter called it a "gentle, melancholy score". Christy Lemire of RogerEbert.com wrote "the score from Daniel Pemberton adds glamour and sprightly energy on the front end and suspense and dramatic heft as the film progresses." Justin Chang of The New Yorker wrote "…Daniel Pemberton’s downbeat score, veer[s] toward moody metropolitan rhapsody". Richard Lawson of Vanity Fair wrote "Lush visual aesthetics are enriched by a lovely soundscape, from composer Daniel Pemberton". Pete Hammond of Deadline Hollywood called it a "nicely nuanced music score", while Siddhant Adlakha of IGN called it "lightly melodic". Nick Schager of The Daily Beast described it as "sorrowful".

== Track listing ==
| No. | Title | Artist(s) | Length |
|---|---|---|---|
| 1. | "A Rich Husband" | | 2:10 |
| 2. | "Materialists" | | 2:35 |
| 3. | "The Non-Negotiables" | | 2:25 |
| 4. | "The Places You Take Me To" | | 2:30 |
| 5. | "A Catch" | | 2:24 |
| 6. | "This Is Dating" | | 1:34 |
| 7. | "Smoke Break" | | 2:55 |
| 8. | "Sophie" | | 1:36 |
| 9. | "Unicorn" | | 1:51 |
| 10. | "Adore Matchmaking" | | 2:54 |
| 11. | "Why Does Anybody Get Married?" | | 4:06 |
| 12. | "Sophie II" | | 1:28 |
| 13. | "Deal" | | 3:24 |
| 14. | "My Baby (Got Nothing At All)" | Japanese Breakfast | 4:02 |
| 15. | "I'll Be Your Mirror" | Baby Rose | 2:39 |
| 16. | "That's All" | Baby Rose | 3:27 |
| Total length: | | | 42:00 |

== Additional music ==
Commercial songs that were featured in the film, but not included in the soundtrack:

- "Manhattan" by Cat Power
- "Got It Bad" by Leisure
- "Sweet Caroline" by Neil Diamond
- "So Young" by The Ronettes
- "You Can't Put Your Arms Around a Memory" by Johnny Thunders
- "Le temps de l'amour" by Françoise Hardy
- "I Guess the Lord Must Be in New York City" by Harry Nilsson
- "Oh! Sweet Nuthin'" by The Velvet Underground
- "In Spite Of Ourselves" by John Prine feat. Iris DeMent

== Personnel ==
Credits adapted from Film Music Reporter:

- Music composer and producer: Daniel Pemberton
- Music supervisor: Meghan Currier
- Music editor: Chad Birmingham
- Score produced by: Daniel Pemberton
- Score recorded and mixed by: Sam Okell & Andy Maxwell
- Orchestrated and conducted by: Andrew Skeet
- Music preparation: Jill Streater, Giles Thornton
- Recording engineer: Sam Okell
- Engineering assistants: Matt Jones, Kit Holdridge
- Additional orchestrators: Tom Little
- Orchestral fixer: Gareth Griffiths
- Strings: Chamber Orchestra of London
- Electronic instrument design: Alex Gruz
- Score recorded at: Angel Studios, London, UK
- Score mixed at: Zennor Sounds, Cornwall, UK
