= Through and Through =

Studio album by Baby Rose
- Released: April 28, 2023
- Studio: Astro Studios; Bravo Ocean Studios; Gnome Studios, Nashville, Tennessee, US; Ocean Way Recording, Los Angeles, California, US; Revival Studio
- Genre: Soul
- Length: 37:04
- Language: English
- Label: Secretly Canadian
- Producer: Baby Rose; Alissia Benveniste; Biako; Bueno; DJ Dahi; Ron Gilmore; John Key; Tim Maxey; Rico Nichols; David Phelps; Tane Runo; Shannon Sanders; John Scherer; Craig Shepherd; Slim Wav; Yuli

Baby Rose chronology
Golden Hour (2020)	Through and Through (2023)

Through and Through is the second full-length studio album by American rhythm and blues singer Baby Rose, released on April 28, 2023 by Secretly Canadian. It has received positive reviews from critics.

== Recording and release ==
Rose had previously released EPs and mixtapes as an independent artist before being signed to a subsidiary of Island Records for her debut full-length To Myself and was promptly dropped from the label. Rose was deliberate about the process of recording her follow-up, moving across the United States and making songs that reflected her emotions and experience. The songs form a narrative of a woman experiencing a break-up and subsequent relationships that lead the protagonist to recognize that she is in a cycle of unhealthy relationships.

I want the listener to be able to feel like it's OK, it's necessary to honor every side of them, every part of them. And so, that's what the intention really is of the album, Through and Through.

—Baby Rose on the theme of Through and Through

== Reception ==
Professional ratings
Review scores
Source	Rating
AllMusic	4/5 stars
Loud and Quiet	9/10
Pitchfork	7.6/10
The Telegraph	5/5 stars

Editors at AllMusic rated this album 4 out of 5 stars, with critic Andy Kellman writing this work is "altogether more dreamlike and less inhibited than" To Myself, her first album. In The Daily Telegraph, Kathleen Johnston summed up her five-star review "It’s the balance between raw emotion and the metaphorical that makes [Rose] so relatable. The album holds up a mirror to ourselves, with a collection of songs that feel instantly familiar, and yet also deliciously, exhilaratingly new". At Loud and Quiet, this was named Album of the Week and critic Sophia McDonald rated it a 9 out of 10, calling it "incredibly lush [music that] pops with energy and swagger", which "drifts on dreamy guitar and rich vocals, luring you into a luscious sonic landscape" and that "spreads its tendrils and embraces you with lavish love". Writing for Pitchfork, Emma Madden scored Through and Through a 7.6 out of 10, praising Rose's voice as similar to Nina Simone, as well as the album's "opulent production and heard-through-the-wall thump".

Complex included this on their mid-year wrap-up of the best albums of the year and chose it as the 26th best album of 2023, with critic Jessica McKinney stating it was "one of the most underrated albums on our mid-year list, but it’s a must-listen" for its "soulful and beautifully crafted body of work that is led by raw talent and sharp production", showing "Rose’s knack for vulnerable storytelling". In a June round-up of the best R&B albums of the year, Uproxx featured this work, which critic Wongo Okon called "an elegant and enchanting showcase of [Rose's] undeniable talents".

In Billboard, reviewers Cydney Lee and Neena Rouhani chose to spotlight two tracks from this album: the Smino duet “I Won’t Tell” showcased Rose as "playful and bold on the funky new track" that "usher[ed] in a new sonic era" for her and “Water” was declared "the perfect accompaniment for summer downpours and early morning showers".

== Track listing ==
1. "Go" (Case Arnold, Baby Rose, Shannon Sanders, and Jessy Wilson; strings composed by Yuli) – 3:26
2. "Fight Club" (Austin Brown, Georgia Anne Muldrow, and Rose) – 3:17
3. "Dance with Me" (Sam Ashworth and Rose) – 3:21
4. "Paranoid" (Rose) – 3:39
5. "I Won’t Tell" (Rose, Smino, and Tim Maxey) – 3:39
6. "Love Bomb" (Rose and Daijah Ross) – 3:02
7. "Tell Me It’s Real" (Rose, Sanders, and Wilson) – 3:18
8. "Nightcap" (David Phelps and Rose) – 2:44
9. "Stop the Bleeding" (Rose, Sanders, and Wilson) – 3:49
10. "Water" (Rose, Sanders, and Wilson) – 2:46
11. "Power" (Trey Best, Rose, and Ross) – 4:04

== Personnel ==
"Go"

- Baby Rose – vocals, additional production
- Case Arnold – additional vocals
- Dale Becker – mastering
- Biako – additional production
- Hope Brush – engineering
- DJ Dahi – additional production
- Alison Emata – viola
- Joshua Harbin – engineering
- Katie Harvey – mastering assistance
- Noah Johnson – cello
- Huiejeong Lee – violin
- Tim Maxey – production
- David Phelps – additional production
- Tane Runo – additional production
- Shannon Sanders – additional vocals
- Julie Saxton – violin
- John Scherer – production
- Tyler Scott – mixing
- Jessy Wilson – additional vocals
- Yuli – viola, additional production

"Fight Club"

- Baby Rose – vocals, additional production
- Dale Becker – mastering
- Biako – production
- Austin Brown – additional vocals
- Jomari Brown – additional vocals
- Hope Brush – engineering
- Joshua Harbin – engineering
- Katie Harvey – mastering assistance
- Tim Maxey – additional production
- Georgia Anne Muldrow – vocals
- Rico Nichols – additional production
- David Phelps – additional vocals, production
- Tyler Scott – mixing
- Itai Shapira – additional vocals

"Dance with Me"

- Baby Rose – vocals, additional production
- Sam Ashworth – additional vocals
- Dale Becker – mastering
- Alison Emata – viola
- Joshua Harbin – engineering
- Katie Harvey – mastering assistance
- Noah Johnson – cello
- Huiejeong Lee – violin
- Tim Maxey – production
- David Phelps – additional production
- Neal Pogue – mixing
- Julie Saxton – violin
- John Scherer – production
- Rio Ville – additional vocals
- Yuli – viola

"Paranoid"

- Baby Rose – vocals, additional production
- Dale Becker – mastering
- Vivian Chavez – additional vocals
- Joshua Harbin – engineering
- Katie Harvey – mastering assistance
- Tim Maxey – additional vocals, production
- John Scherer – additional vocals, production
- Tyler Scott – mixing
- Craig Shepherd – additional production
- Shatel Teague – additional vocals

"I Won't Tell"

- Baby Rose – vocals, production
- Dale Becker – mastering
- Alissia Benveniste – additional vocals, production
- Biako – additional production
- Joshua Harbin – engineering
- Katie Harvey – mastering assistance
- Tim Maxey – additional vocals, production
- David Phelps – additional vocals, additional production
- Tane Runo – additional vocals
- John Scherer – production
- Tyler Scott – mixing
- Smino – vocals

"Love Bomb"

- Baby Rose – vocals, production
- Biako – production
- Bueno – additional production
- Nathan Dantzler – mastering
- Tim Maxey – production
- David Phelps – production
- Daijah Ross – additional vocals
- John Scherer – production
- Tyler Scott – mixing
- Harrison Tate – mastering
- Slim Wav – additional production
- Yuli – additional production

"Tell Me It's Real"

- Baby Rose – vocals, additional production
- Dale Becker – mastering
- Joshua Harbin – engineering
- Katie Harvey – mastering assistance
- Tim Maxey – production
- David Phelps – additional production
- Daijah Ross – additional vocals
- Tyler Scott – mixing
- John Scherer – production

"Nightcap"

- Baby Rose – vocals, additional production
- Biako – production
- Nathan Dantzler – mastering
- David Phelps – additional vocals, engineering, production
- Tyler Scott – mixing
- Harrison Tate – mastering

"Stop the Bleeding"

- Baby Rose – vocals, production
- Nathan Dantzler – mastering
- Ron Gilmore – additional production
- David Phelps – production
- Shannon Sanders – production
- John Scherer – production
- Tyler Scott – mixing
- Craig Shepherd – additional production
- Harrison Tate – mastering

"Water"

- Baby Rose – vocals, additional production
- Biako – additional production
- Nathan Dantzler – mastering
- Alison Emata – viola
- Joshua Harbin – engineering
- Noah Johnson – cello
- Huiejeong Lee – violin
- Tim Maxey – production
- David Phelps – additional production
- Julie Saxton – violin
- John Scherer – production
- Tyler Scott – mixing
- Harrison Tate – mastering

"Power"

- Baby Rose – vocals, production
- Trey Best – additional vocals
- Hope Brush – engineering
- Bueno – additional production
- Nathan Dantzler – mastering
- DJ Dahi – production assistance
- John Key – production
- Daijah Ross – additional vocals
- Tane Runo – additional vocals, production assistance
- Tyler Scott – mixing
- Harrison Tate – mastering
- Slim Wav – additional production

Additional personnel

- Nicole Hernandez – photography
- Miles Johnson – design

== See also ==
- 2023 in American music
- List of 2023 albums
