= Los Wálters =

Puerto Rican indie pop band

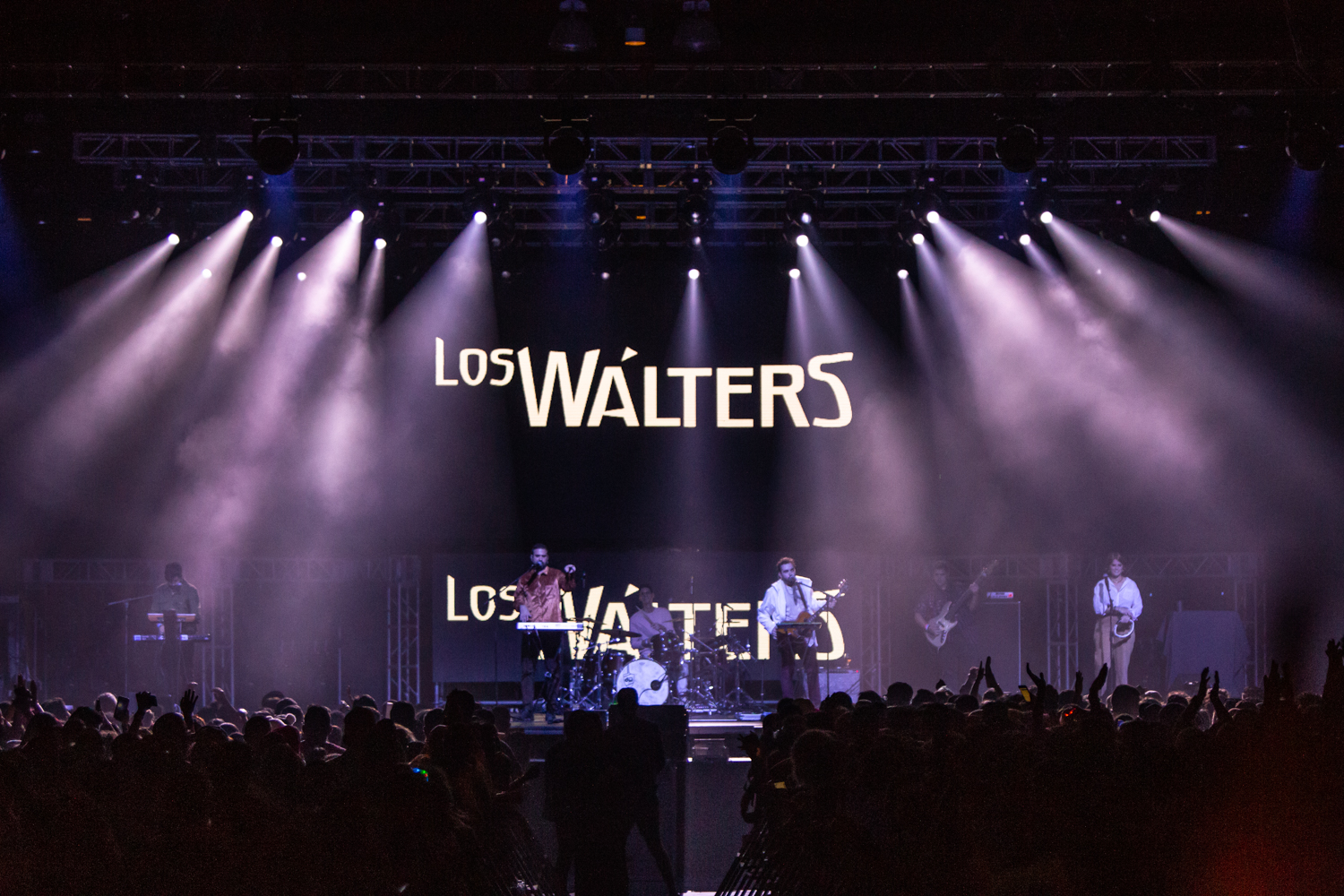
- Los Wálters performing live in San Juan

Background information
- Origin: Puerto Rico
- Genres: indie pop
- Years active: 2011–present
- Members: Ángel Figueroa, Luis López

Los Wálters is a Puerto Rican indie pop band formed in 2011 by Luis López Varona and Ángel Emanuel Figueroa. The group has a successful career in Puerto Rico, with performances in the island top venues and festivals around Mexico, Miami, New York, Boston, Chicago, San Francisco, Los Angeles, Colombia, and Dominican Republic.

== History ==
The group formed in 2011 when López and Figueroa met each other while hanging out. The duo began to trade musical ideas and sharing beats online while both members lived in different cities such as San Juan, Philadelphia, Barcelona, Rio de Janeiro and Miami. They began to work on a project called Yo soy Luis él es Juan created by Luis and his friend Juan Fernández, before Ángel moved to Philadelphia. They worked under the names Casa Club, Walter Mercado's Club before eventually changing their official name to Los Wálters.

They released their debut eponymous EP in 2011, with their first album released in 2013 titled #ponteelcasco. Their second album Verano Panorámico was released in 2014. Their third album Isla Disco was released in 2016, with some of their most memorable songs like Claridad and Mayagüez.

The band also worked on a song for the annual Banco Popular Christmas album where they recorded with Eduardo Alegría the cover of Y yo no bailo a song originally made by Menudo.

== Discography ==
=== Albums ===
- Los Wálters EP – 2011
- #ponteelcasco – 2011
- Verano Panorámico – 2013
- Isla Disco – 2016
- Caramelo EP – 2018
- Miss Universos – 2021
- Dinamarca (Single) – 2021
