= Midsommar =

2019 film by Ari Aster

- Theatrical release poster
- Directed by: Ari Aster
- Written by: Ari Aster
- Produced by: Patrik Andersson; Lars Knudsen
- Starring: Florence Pugh; Jack Reynor; William Jackson Harper; Vilhelm Blomgren; Ellora Torchia; Archie Madekwe; Will Poulter
- Cinematography: Pawel Pogorzelski
- Edited by: Lucian Johnston
- Music by: Bobby Krlic
- Production companies: Square Peg; B-Reel Films; A24
- Distributed by: A24 (United States); Nordisk Film (Sweden)
- Release dates: June 18, 2019 (Alamo Drafthouse Cinema); July 3, 2019 (United States)
- Running time: 141 minutes
- Countries: United States; Sweden
- Language: English
- Budget: $9 million
- Box office: $48.5 million

Midsommar is a 2019 folk horror film written and directed by Ari Aster. It stars Florence Pugh and Jack Reynor as an American couple who are drawn into a violent cult in rural Sweden. Supporting actors include William Jackson Harper, Vilhelm Blomgren, Ellora Torchia, Archie Madekwe, and Will Poulter.

A co-production between the United States and Sweden, Midsommar was initially pitched to Aster as a straightforward slasher film set among Swedish cultists. While elements of the original concept remain in the final product, the finished film focuses on a deteriorating relationship inspired by a difficult breakup experienced by Aster himself. The film's soundtrack, composed by the British electronic musician Bobby Krlic, takes inspiration from Nordic folk music. The film was predominantly shot on location within the Budapest metropolitan area of Hungary, from July to October 2018.

Midsommar was theatrically released in the United States by A24 on July 3, 2019, and in Sweden by Nordisk Film on July 10, 2019. The film grossed $48 million and received positive reviews, with praise for Aster's direction and Pugh's performance.

== Plot ==
In the middle of winter, American student Dani is traumatized after her sister Terri, who has bipolar disorder, kills their parents and herself via carbon monoxide poisoning in a murder-suicide. This strains Dani's relationship with her already increasingly distant boyfriend Christian.

Several months later, Christian and his friends Mark and Josh have been invited by their Swedish friend Pelle to attend a nine-day midsummer festival at his ancestral commune, the Hårga, in the rural Hälsingland region of Sweden. The festival occurs only once every 90 years. Josh, writing his thesis on European midsummer festivities, regards it as a once-in-a-lifetime opportunity. Christian had intended to break up with Dani, who is still grieving the death of her family, but reluctantly invites her after an argument.

At the commune, they meet Simon and Connie, a British couple who were invited by Pelle's commune-brother Ingemar. Ingemar offers the group psychedelic mushrooms. Dani has a bad trip and hallucinates her dead family. The day after their arrival, the group witnesses an ättestupa ceremony, whereby two elders commit suicide by jumping off a cliff onto the rocks below. When one of the elders survives, the commune members mimic his wails of pain before crushing his head with a mallet. The commune elder, Siv, attempts to calm Connie and Simon by explaining that every member does this at the age of 72.

Christian also decides to write his thesis on the Hårga commune, irritating Josh, who has also decided to write solely about the Hårga. Dani is disturbed by the ceremonies, but Pelle convinces her to stay. He explains that he, too, was orphaned after his parents perished in a fire, and the commune became his new family. He questions Dani over whether she feels supported by Christian. Connie and Simon, disturbed by the Hårga's practices, demand to leave. While packing, Connie is told Simon has been driven to a train station on his own. Connie protests that Simon would never leave her without leaving a message, and walks away silently in anger. During his thesis research, Christian is told that outsiders are sometimes brought into the commune for "mating" purposes to avoid incest. He is encouraged to participate but refuses. After unwittingly urinating on a sacred tree, Mark is lured away by Inga, one of the female commune members. That night, Josh sneaks out of bed to take illicit photographs of sacred texts. He is caught by a half-naked man wearing Mark's skinned face and is bludgeoned to death.

The following day, Dani and Christian are pressured into drinking a hallucinogenic tea. Dani wins a maypole dancing competition, inspired by the myth of Hårgalåten, and is crowned May Queen. Christian participates in a sex ritual to impregnate commune woman Maja while older nude female members watch and mimic her moans. Dani witnesses the ritual and has a panic attack. She is surrounded by the commune's women, who comfort her and mimic her cries. After the ritual, a naked Christian attempts to flee. He discovers Josh's leg planted in a flowerbed and a barely alive Simon on display in a barn, having been made into a blood eagle. An elder blows a powder in Christian's face, paralyzing him.

For the final ceremony, the leaders explain that the commune must offer nine human sacrifices to purge itself of evil. The first four victims (Mark, Josh, Simon, and Connie) were outsiders lured to them by Pelle and Ingemar, while the next four (the two elderly members who killed themselves in the beginning, plus volunteers Ingemar and Ulf) are from the commune. As the May Queen, Dani must choose the paralyzed Christian or a randomly selected commune member as the final sacrifice. She chooses Christian, who is stuffed into a disemboweled bear's body and placed in a wooden temple alongside the other sacrifices. As the commune prays, the temple is set alight. As the temple and its human sacrifices burn, the commune members mimic Ulf's screams. Dani sobs, but as the temple collapses, slowly smiles.

== Cast ==
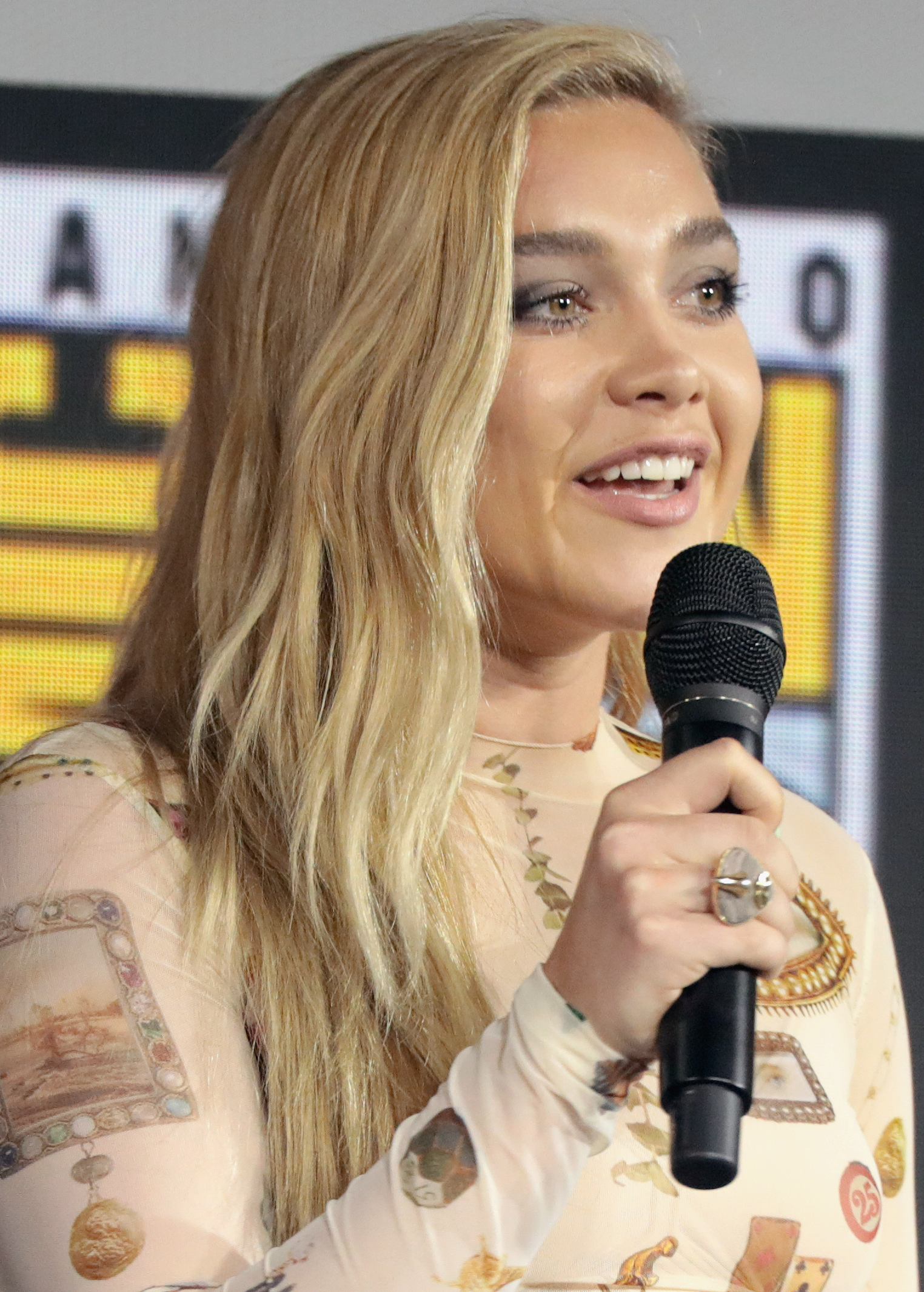
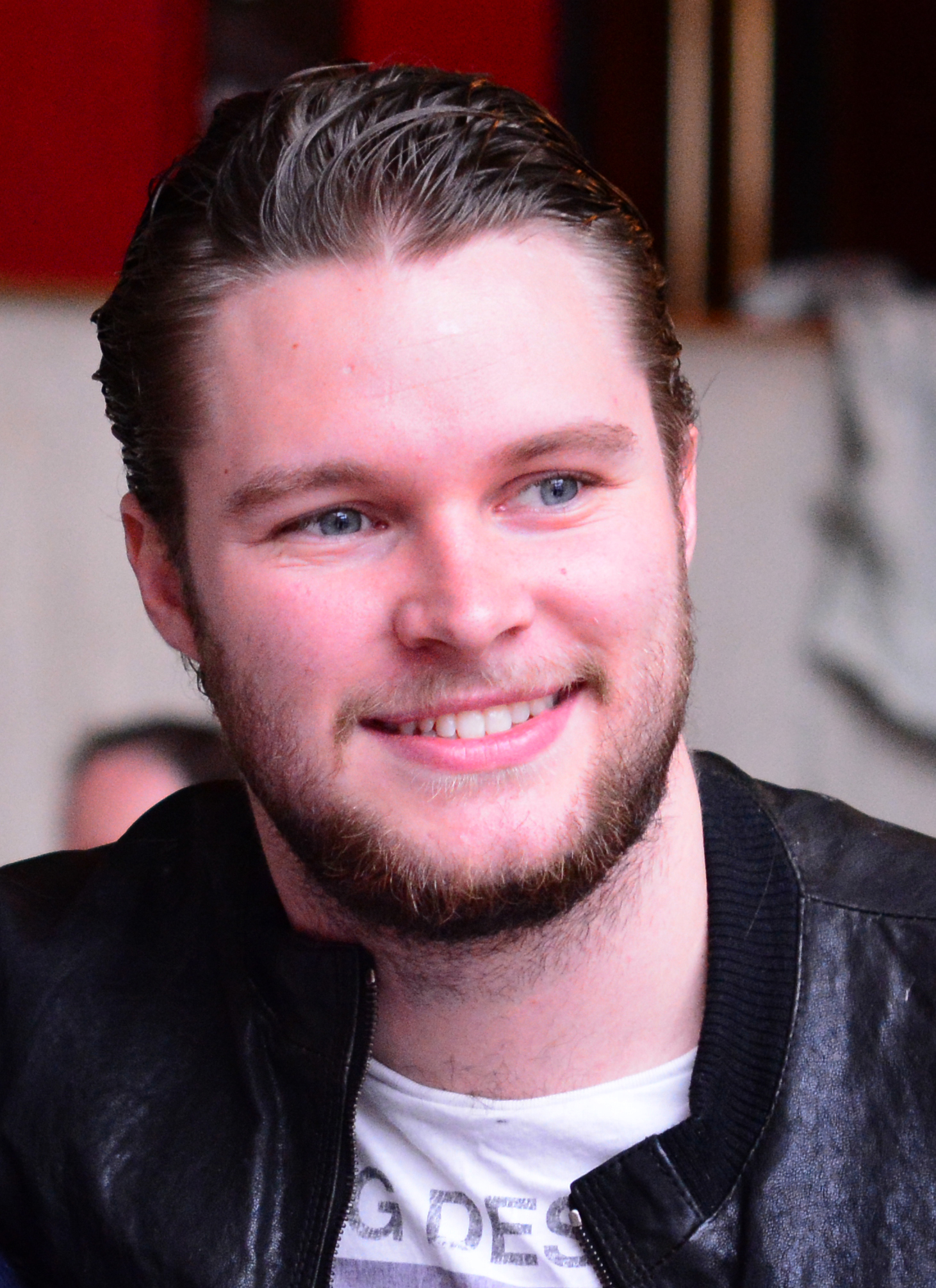
The film stars actors Florence Pugh (left) and Jack Reynor (right)
- Florence Pugh as Dani
- Jack Reynor as Christian
- Will Poulter as Mark
- William Jackson Harper as Josh
- Vilhelm Blomgren as Pelle
- Archie Madekwe as Simon
- Ellora Torchia as Connie
- Gunnel Fred as Siv
- Henrik Norlén as Ulf
- Julia Ragnarsson as Inga
- Anna Åström as Karin
- Liv Mjönes as Ulla
- Louise Peterhoff as Hanna
- Björn Andrésen as Dan
- Hampus Hallberg as Ingemar

== Production ==
=== Development ===
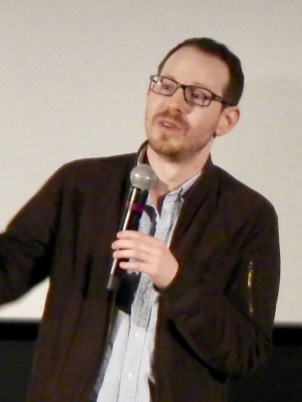
Writer and director Ari Aster

In May 2018, it was announced that Ari Aster would write and direct the film, with Lars Knudsen serving as producer. B-Reel Films, a Swedish company, produced the film alongside Square Peg, with A24 distributing. Aster's previous horror film, Hereditary, had been a huge critical success, making over $80 million to become A24's highest-grossing film worldwide. According to Aster, he had been approached by B-Reel executives Martin Karlqvist and Patrik Andersson to helm a slasher film set in Sweden, an idea which he initially rejected as he felt he "had no way into the story." Aster ultimately devised a plot in which the two central characters are experiencing relationship tensions verging on a breakup, and wrote the surrounding screenplay around this theme. He described the result as "a breakup movie dressed in the clothes of a folk horror film." Aster has mentioned 1981 Albert Brooks film Modern Romance as an inspiration for Midsommar, and also called it "The Wizard of Oz for perverts".

Aster worked with the film's production designer, Henrik Svensson, to develop the film's folklore elements and the traditions of the Hårga, while visiting Hälsingland together. He researched Hälsingegårds, "centuries-old farms that typically had painting on the walls", to develop a stylized version for the set, as well as May Day and midsummer celebrations in Swedish, German and English folklore. Aster also researched spiritual movements and communities, saying he particularly drew inspiration from Rudolf Steiner's anthroposophy and Theosophy.

Florence Pugh, Jack Reynor, Will Poulter, Vilhem Blomgren, William Jackson Harper, Ellora Torchia, and Archie Madekwe joined the cast in July 2018.

=== Filming ===
Some early scenes set in the United States were also filmed there; Dani's apartment was filmed in Brooklyn, New York City, while other scenes where Christian's friends interact were filmed in Utah. The majority of the film was shot in Hungary rather than Sweden, primarily due to financial constraints, but also as Sweden limits daily film shoots to no longer than eight hours. Principal photography began on July 30, 2018, in Budapest, and wrapped that October.

Harper said the shoot was "arduous" due to the heat. Wasps were highly abundant and a major issue on set. Pugh reflected "the shoot was totally nuts" and commended Aster's direction: "he was dealing with possibly 100, 120 people, additional extras and actors there, all speaking in three different languages and he was the captain of the ship".

Ahead of filming the drug use scenes, Reynor said that the cast discussed their own experiences with psychedelic mushrooms. On her breakdown scene with the Hårga, Pugh commended the other women involved, saying they "made this scene possible" as she typically struggles to cry on camera. She reflected: "I knew I would never be so open and so raw and so exhausted like I was that day ever again".

The sex scene between Christian and Maja was filmed on the final day. Reynor said he spent time attempting to boost morale among the extras involved, none of whom spoke English, and Isabelle Grill (who plays Maja) who was appearing in her first feature film role. He reflected that he felt male nudity was unusual for a horror film, where female nudity is more typical. He said that he "advocated for as much full-frontal nudity as possible, I wanted to embrace the feeling of being exposed and the humiliation of this character. And I felt really, really vulnerable, more than I had even anticipated".

=== Props and costume design ===
Svensson said the mallet prop used for the senicide scene was a replica of one at a museum in Stockholm, and that the cliff-jumping was based on historic practices in Sweden. Costume designer Andrea Flesch developed the Hårga's costumes with antique linen from Hungary and Romania, and buttons from Sweden. Aster asked for the clothing to appear handmade, and for the Hårga to dress in white. Many of their costumes were hand-embroidered with rune designs unique to individual community members, signifying their families and occupations. Murals and tapestries in the background of some scenes indicate events in the film.

In April 2020, A24 announced it would be auctioning off props from its films and television series, including the 10,000-silk-flower May Queen dress worn by Pugh, which was reportedly purchased by the Academy Museum of Motion Pictures for $65,000, after both Ariana Grande and Halsey had expressed interest on social media. The proceeds were donated to provide COVID-19 pandemic relief for firefighters and their families. Other items from the film that sold at auction were the bear costume worn by Reynor for $4,760, the mallet used to crush a cult member's skull for $10,000, and other villager costumes that sold in the $4,500 range. All the proceeds from the Midsommar collection raised over $100,000 for the FDNY Foundation.

=== Post-production ===
Aster said the visual effects for the psychedelic scenes involved trial and error: "I'm sure for some of those shots we got to the point where we had 60 versions. In one iteration the tripping was way too distracting and you're not paying attention to the characters. Then you brought it down to the point where if you are paying attention to the characters, you'll never notice the tripping effects." The more minimal visual effects were settled on a week before the first screening.

There was around a six-week debate as to whether the film would be given an NC-17 rating, which is considered harmful to a film's box-office performance, or an R rating by the MPAA for its US release due to its graphic nudity, with it eventually being given the R rating after cuts.

== Music ==
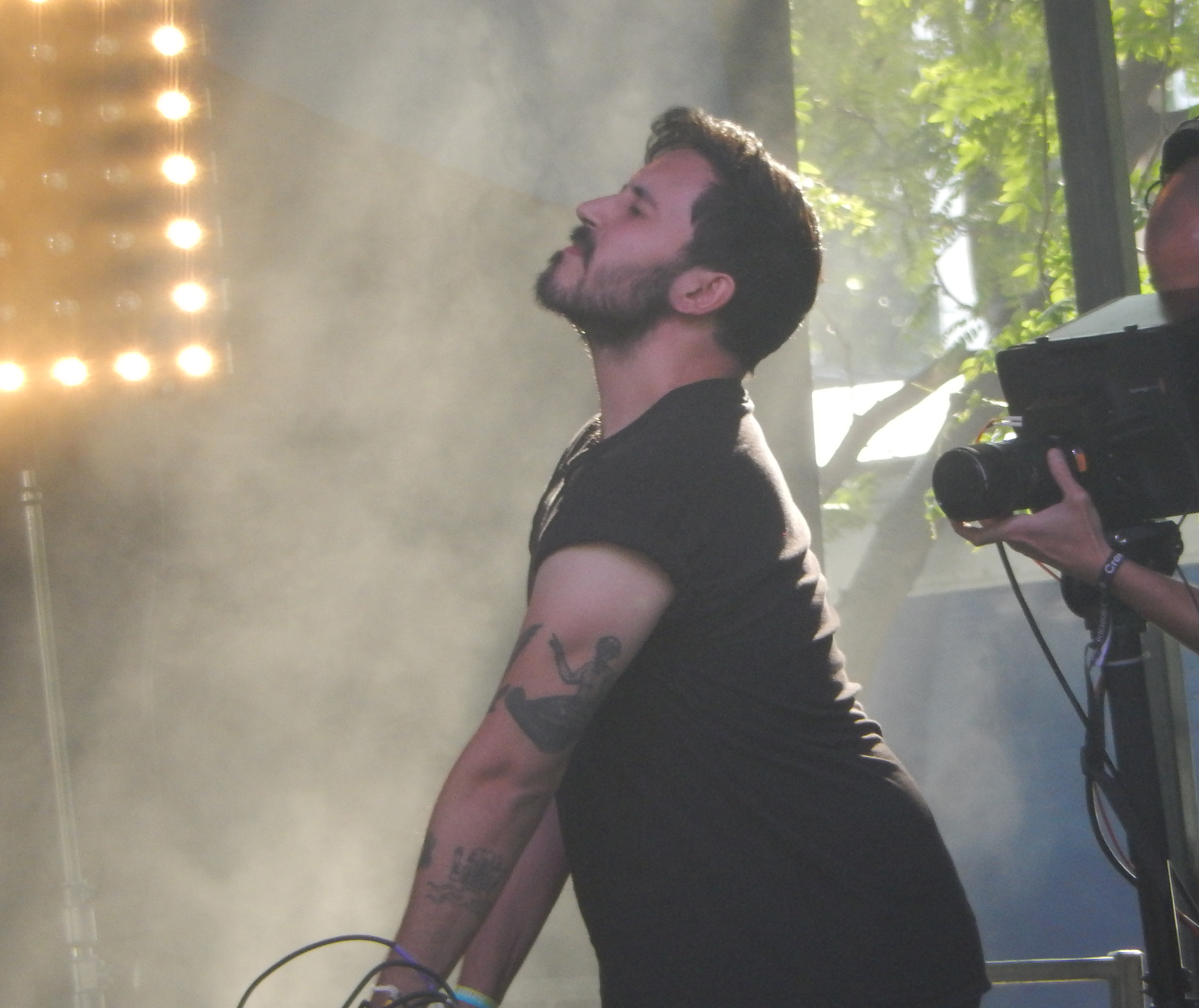
Aster recruited electronic musician Bobby Krlic (The Haxan Cloak) to compose the film's score, having written the film while listening to Krlic's 2013 album Excavation.

Aster wrote the film while listening to the British electronic musician the Haxan Cloak's 2013 album Excavation. Aster recruited him to compose the score, credited under his real name, Bobby Krlic. Krlic began composing the music before filming began, taking inspiration from Nordic folk music, and collaborating closely with Aster. The film makes use of diegetic music, where events on screen meld with the score. The soundtrack album was released on July 5, 2019, via Milan Records.

== Release ==
Midsommar had a pre-release screening at the Alamo Drafthouse Cinema in New York City, on June 18, 2019. It was theatrically released in the United States on July 3, 2019.

=== Director's cut ===
Aster's original 171-minute cut of the film, which A24 asked Aster to trim down for a wide theatrical release, had its world premiere at the Film Society of Lincoln Center in New York City on August 20, 2019. It was shown in theaters across the United States for a weekend starting on August 29, 2019. The director's cut was released as an Apple TV exclusive on September 24, 2019. On physical media, it saw a British release on Blu-ray and DVD on October 28, 2019, an Australian Blu-ray release on November 6, 2019 and a US release on Blu-ray in July 2020.

As part of the A24 x IMAX venture, the director's cut was shown in select IMAX auditoriums on June 20, 2024, to coincide with the summer solstice.

=== Home media ===
Midsommar was released on Digital HD on September 24, 2019, and on DVD and Blu-ray on October 8, 2019. The director's cut of the film was then released on Blu-ray and 4K Ultra HD Blu-ray as an A24 shop exclusive on July 20, 2020, in limited copies.

== Reception ==
=== Box office ===
Midsommar grossed $27.5 million in the United States and Canada, and $20.5 million in other territories, for a total worldwide gross of $48 million.

In the United States and Canada, the film was projected to gross $8–10 million from 2,707 theaters over its first five days. It made $3 million on its first day, including $1.1 million from Tuesday night previews, which Deadline Hollywood called a "smashing start". It went on to debut to $10.9 million, finishing sixth at the box office; IndieWire said it was "just decent" given its estimated $8 million budget, but the film would likely find success in home media. In its second weekend, the film dropped 44% to $3.7 million, finishing in eighth, and then made $1.6 million in its third weekend, finishing in ninth.

=== Audience reception ===
Audiences polled by CinemaScore gave the film a grade of "C+" on an A+ to F scale, while those at PostTrak gave it an average 3 out of 5 stars, with 50% saying they would definitely recommend it. Ankur Pathak of The Huffington Post says it "divided audiences (and some critics)", while Screen Rant writer Mark Birrell said it was "one of the most polarizing horror movies of 2019" among general audiences. Birrell cited, as the film's positive qualities, its performances, cinematography, music, its atmospheric tone, which Birrell said was grounded in realism and a high level of attention to detail, and its themes, which included its exploration of mental health issues. However, he attributed its uneven audience reception to negative aspects, such as its length, its lack of subtlety, its derivativeness and poor use of genre clichés, its over-stylization, its tendency to be over-serious, the implausible plot, the one-dimensionality of the characters, which Birrell found irritating, and the fact that he did not find the film scary.

=== Critical response ===
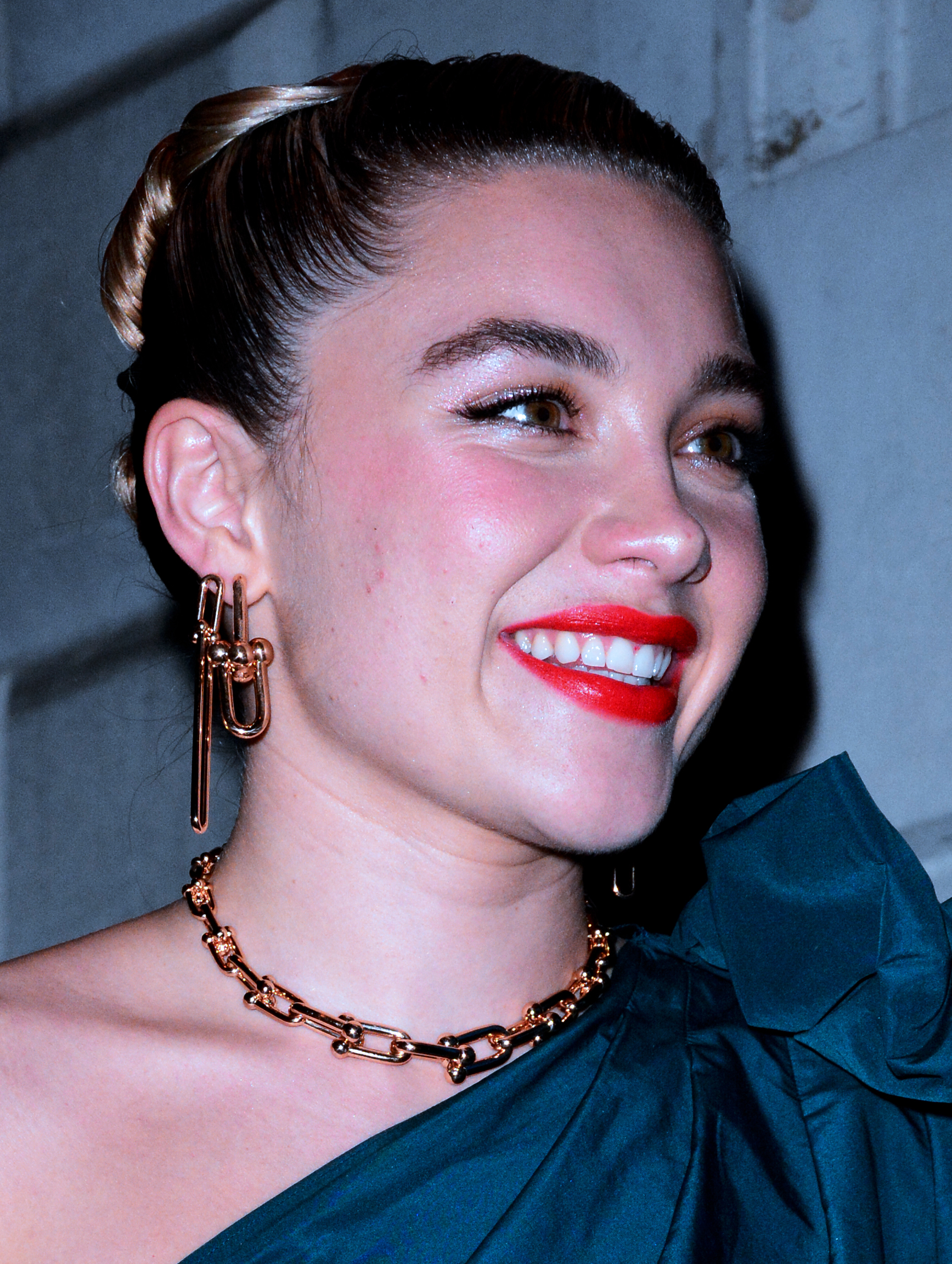
Florence Pugh garnered acclaim for her performance as Dani Ardor.

On the review aggregator website Rotten Tomatoes, the film holds an approval rating of 83% based on 405 reviews, and an average rating of 7.6/10. The site's critical consensus reads, "Ambitious, impressively crafted, and above all unsettling, Midsommar further proves writer-director Ari Aster is a horror auteur to be reckoned with." On Metacritic, which uses a weighted average, the film has a score of 72 out of 100, based on 54 reviews, indicating "generally favorable reviews".

John DeFore of The Hollywood Reporter described the film as the "horror equivalent of a destination wedding", and "more unsettling than frightening, [but] still a trip worth taking." Writing for Variety, Andrew Barker noted that it is "neither the masterpiece nor the disaster that the film's most vocal viewers are bound to claim. Rather, it's an admirably strange, thematically muddled curiosity from a talented filmmaker who allows his ambitions to outpace his execution." David Edelstein of Vulture praised Pugh's performance as "amazingly vivid" and noted that Aster "paces Midsommar more like an opera (Wagner, not Puccini) than a scare picture," but concluded that the film "doesn't jell because its impulses are so bifurcated. It's a parable of a woman's religious awakening—that's also a woman's fantasy of revenge against a man who didn't meet her emotional needs—that's also a male director's masochistic fantasy of emasculation at the hands of a matriarchal cult." In The New York Times, Manohla Dargis was critical of the character depth behind Dani and Christian, finding them "instructively uninteresting" and stereotypically gendered as a couple.

Eric Kohn of IndieWire summarized the film as a "perverse breakup movie," adding that "Aster doesn't always sink the biggest surprises, but he excels at twisting the knife. After a deflowering that makes Ken Russell's The Devils look tame, Aster finds his way to a startling reality check." Time Out's Joshua Rothkopf awarded the film a 5/5 star-rating, writing, "A savage yet evolved slice of Swedish folk-horror, Ari Aster's hallucinatory follow-up to Hereditary proves him a horror director with no peer."

For The A.V. Club, A. A. Dowd stated that the film "rivals Hereditary in the cruel shock department", and labelled it a "B+ effort". Writing for Inverse, Eric Francisco commented that the film feels "like a victory lap after Hereditary", and that Aster "takes his sweet time to lull viewers into his clutches ... But like how the characters experience time, its passage is a vague notion." He described the film as "a sharp portrayal of gaslighting". Richard Brody of The New Yorker said that the film "is built on such a void of insight and experience, such a void of character and relationships, that even the first level of the house of narrative cards can't stand." He added, "In the end, the subject of Midsommar is as simple as it is regressive: lucky Americans, stay home." Emma Madden in The Guardian criticised the film for its depiction of disabled characters as "monstrous" and argued that it resurrects harmful horror film tropes of ableism and eugenics.

Tomris Laffly of RogerEbert.com rated the film 4 out of 4 stars, describing it as a "terrifically juicy, apocalyptic cinematic sacrament that dances around a fruitless relationship in dizzying circles". A Vanity Fair article from December 2019 reflecting on the 2010s in horror films argued that Midsommar was part of a trend of "elevated horror", along with Aster's previous Hereditary and Robert Eggers-directed The Witch, and that it was an example of "horror at its best".

In 2025, the film ranked number 99 on the "Readers' Choice" edition of The New York Times' list of "The 100 Best Movies of the 21st Century."

=== Accolades ===
Award	Date of ceremony	Category	Recipient(s)	Result	Ref(s)
Gotham Independent Film Awards	December 2, 2019	Best Actress	Florence Pugh	Nominated	
Gotham Independent Film Awards	December 2, 2019	Best Screenplay	Ari Aster	Nominated	
Hollywood Critics Association	January 9, 2020	Best Horror	Midsommar	Nominated	
Independent Spirit Awards	February 8, 2020	Best Cinematography	Pawel Pogorzelski	Nominated	
Ivor Novello Awards	September 2, 2020	Best Original Score	Bobby Krlic	Won	
National Society of Film Critics	January 4, 2020	Best Actress	Florence Pugh	3rd place	
Santa Barbara International Film Festival	January 17, 2020	Virtuoso Award	Florence Pugh	Won	
Saturn Awards	October 26, 2021	Best Horror Film	Midsommar	Nominated	
Fangoria Chainsaw Awards	February 7, 2020	Best Wide Release	Midsommar	Won	
Fangoria Chainsaw Awards	February 7, 2020	Best Director	Ari Aster	Won	
Fangoria Chainsaw Awards	February 7, 2020	Best Screenplay	Ari Aster	Won	
Fangoria Chainsaw Awards	February 7, 2020	Best Score	The Haxan Cloak	Won	
Fangoria Chainsaw Awards	February 7, 2020	Best Kill	Christian and the Bear Suit on Fire	Won	

== Themes and analysis ==
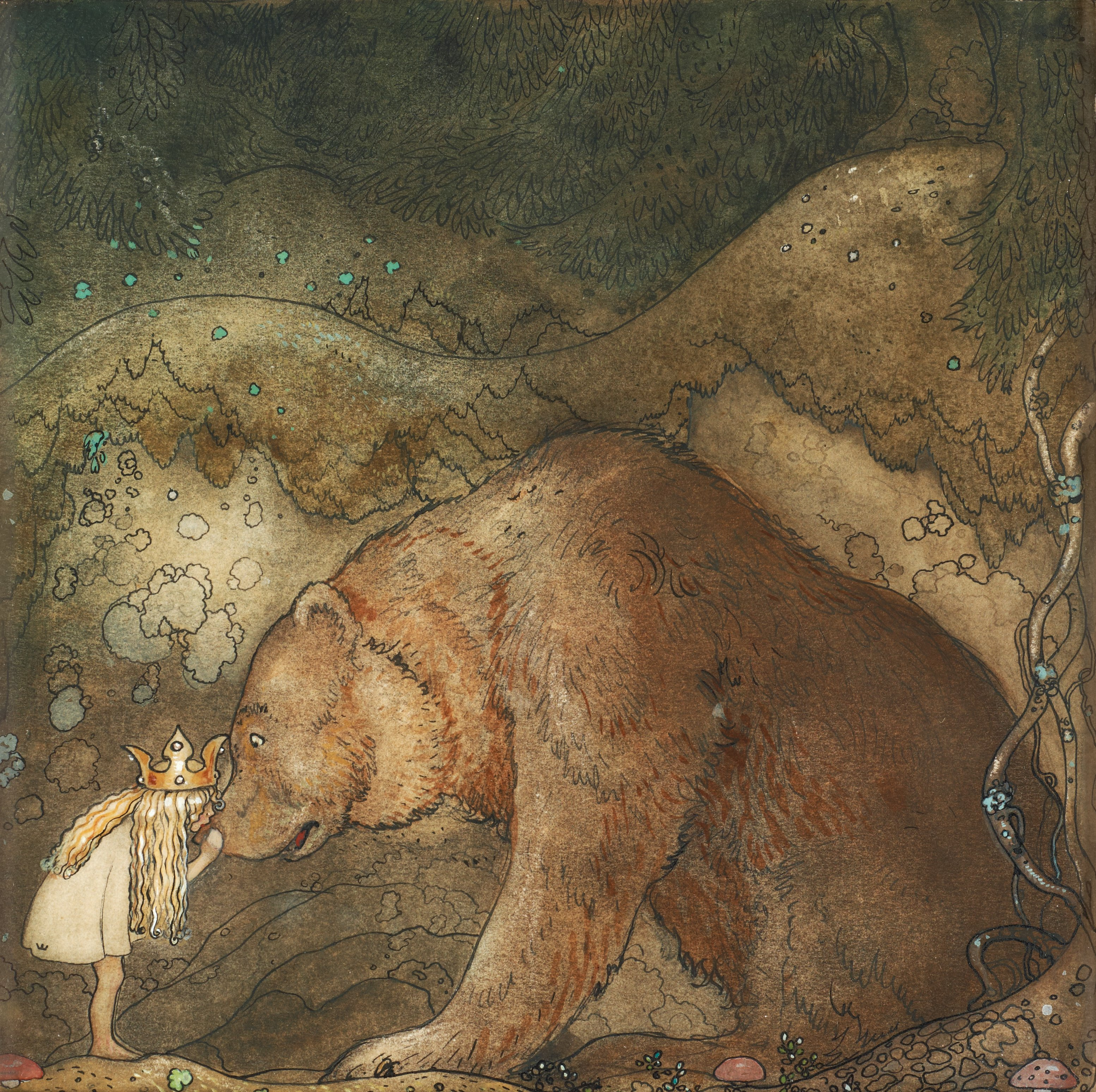
Swedish illustrator John Bauer's Stackars lilla Basse! appears in an early scene in the film; Vox proposes it hints at later moments in the film, while also aligning with the film's fairy tale style.

Writing in The Guardian, Steve Rose describes Midsommar as "a powerful study of grief, betrayal, breakups, and more". Rose suggests that Dani's three male companions may be seen as representing "toxic masculinity", or analogues of the three male companions in The Wizard of Oz (namely the Tin Man, Cowardly Lion and the Scarecrow). Rose proposes that the film may be read as a "parable of snarky, city-smart, modern rationalism undone by primal rural values". Alternatively, he proposes that the villagers' traditions could be read as far-right, white nationalist or eugenicist.

In Vox, Alissa Wilkinson described Midsommar's story as following Dani's emotional journey and following fairy tale conventions, where Dani loses her family at the beginning and goes on to become a Queen, as with Cinderella and Snow White. The article also notes the use of imagery foreshadowing later events throughout the film. Aster himself said "We begin as Dani loses a family, and we end as Dani gains one. And so, for better or worse, [the Hårga] are there to provide exactly what she is lacking, and exactly what she needs, in true fairy tale fashion."

The sex scene between Christian and Maja has been the subject of debate as to whether it depicts rape. An article in Sexuality & Culture asserts that "the ambiguous nature of this scene may be viewed as problematic because it blurs the line between consent and sexual assault" and that the film has implications for contemporary understandings of rape, particularly of males.

== See also ==
- The Wicker Man, a 1973 British folk horror film revolving around a pagan cult.
