= Anymore (Goldfrapp song) =

Single by Goldfrapp

from the album Silver Eye
- Released: 23 January 2017
- Genre: Dance-pop; electronica; synth-pop
- Length: 3:54
- Label: Mute
- Songwriter(s): Alison Goldfrapp; William Owen Gregory
- Producer(s): Alison Goldfrapp; William Owen Gregory; The Haxan Cloak (add.); John Congleton (add.)

Goldfrapp singles chronology
"Thea" (2014)	"Anymore" (2017)	"Systemagic" (2017)

"Anymore" is a song performed by English group Goldfrapp from their seventh studio album Silver Eye (2017). It was released as a CD single and digital download on 23 January 2017 through Mute Records. The song was written and produced by Alison Goldfrapp and William Owen Gregory, with additional production coming from The Haxan Cloak and John Congleton. The song incorporates several genres, including dance-pop, electronica and synth-pop, and takes influence from disco and glitch music. Critics noticed similarities between "Anymore" and the music from their 2003 album Black Cherry. Lyrically, Goldfrapp sings in robotic vocals about romance, which one critic felt referenced their 2005 single "Ooh La La".

Critically, "Anymore" drew a generally positive response from music critics. Several reviewers noted the strength of the single as an album opener on Silver Eye. However, some critics found the track to be mediocre when compared with Goldfrapp's previous material. An accompanying music video for the song directed by Mary Calderwell was released on 9 February 2017 and filmed on the island of Fuerteventura. Featuring Alison Goldfrapp and a group of background dancers, they perform various choreography in the desert amidst an empty background. The accompanying videos for Goldfrapp's later singles from Silver Eye serve as a continuation of the one for "Anymore".

== Background and release ==
"Anymore" was released on 23 January 2017 as the lead single from Goldfrapp's seventh studio album Silver Eye (2017). A CD single featuring the radio edit and album version of the song was also released exclusively in the United Kingdom. It was written and produced by members Alison Goldfrapp and William Owen Gregory with The Haxan Cloak and John Congleton serving as additional producers.

On 24 February 2017, Mute Records issued a digital EP that included four remixes of "Anymore" created by disc jockeys Danny Dove and Joe Goddard. While creating the mixes, Goddard claimed that he was inspired by the music of LFO and Supermayer in order to create "tense and chaotic" remixes of the single. Referring to Goddard's remixes of the song, David Renshaw from The Fader called Goldfrapp's vocals "haunting" and the reworked song a "taut and powerful techno workout".

== Composition and lyrics ==
"Anymore" is a dance-pop and electronica song that features Goldfrapp's signature "pop-leaning vocals". In addition, it has also been described by Vanyaland's Michael Marotta as a synth-pop song that takes influence from the disco and glitch genres, which Eugenie Johnson from DIY considered as the group cementing their position in the "electronic territory". Regarding the vocals, PopMatters' Steve Horowitz considered them "light" when surrounded by a rhythm consisting of "harder industrial sounds"; Paul Carr from the same publication noted that Goldfrapp returned to an electroclash sound with "Anymore", also pointing out their use of synths on the track. Agreeing with Horowitz's analysis of it being "industrial", Chris White of musicOMH noted its dance rhythm stemming from a "pulsating, industrial beat". Anna Gaca from Spin compared its dance-styled production to the group's 2003 album Black Cherry and early Madonna songs. In a similar claim, Under the Radar's Matt Raven felt it resembled their albums Black Cherry and Supernature (2005). The "boomeranging riffs and whistles" found in the song's production was compared to those created by William Orbit for Madonna's 1998 song "Ray of Light" by Gaca.

In the lyrics, Goldfrapp and Gregory write about the passion found in romance and love; the former sings, "I want your love / All of the time" during a "slippery bass synth" sound in the production. Opening the song, she demands, "You're what I want / You're what I need / Give me your love / Make me a freak". Goldfrapp sings with robotic, or "android"-like, vocals and moans, "Ooh, connect me / Ooh, to the other side". The aforementioned lyrics were also considered similar to the ones in their 2005 song "Ooh La La".

== Critical reception ==
Upon release, "Anymore" received a mixed to positive response from music critics. Several critics noted that the track serves as a strong opener for Silver Eye. David Chiu from Consequence of Sound described the song as an "outstanding opening track" for "fans who have been waiting for Goldfrapp to somehow get back to their dance club roots". Agreeing, Daryl Easlea, writing for Record Collector, labelled it as the "perfect opener". In the album review for Silver Eye, AllMusic's Heather Phares claimed that "Anymore" was a "quintessential" track and noted how the duo tends to open their albums in similar manners. A group of critics from PopMatters reviewed the recording in their "Singles Going Steady" column; Adriane Pontecorvo from the publication stated that although it "isn't breaking any barriers", it "makes no apologies" and "promises a good time". Chris Ingalls thought similarly and said, "'Anymore' won't change your life, but it'll get stuck in your head for the better part of the morning". And finally, Andrew Paschal was more mixed to the track, awarding it five out of ten stars, and claiming that the track is "fun" but overall found it to be too predictable.

== Music video ==
A music video for "Anymore" was released on 9 February 2017. It was produced by Mary Calderwell and filmed on Fuerteventura. In the clip, Goldfrapp and a group of female dancers perform choreography in the desert; according to Ben Kaye from Consequence of Sound, the setting of the video "evokes a strange anxiety" in the viewer due to the "emptiness" of the surroundings. Spin's Gaca also reviewed the song's video and claimed that it "could easily double as an avant-garde couture campaign". The official music video for "Systemagic", the second single from the parent album, also uses the same dancers from the "Anymore" music video but in a "decidedly less sunny" setting.

== Track listings and formats ==
Digital download

1. "Anymore" – 3:54

Remixes digital EP

1. "Anymore" (Joe Goddard Remix Edit) – 3:29
2. "Anymore" (Danny Dove Remix Edit) – 3:32
3. "Anymore" (Joe Goddard Remix) – 6:13
4. "Anymore" (Danny Dove Remix) – 5:48

United Kingdom CD

1. "Anymore" (Radio Edit) – 3:24
2. "Anymore" (Album Version) – 3:54

"Systemagic" / "Anymore" (Remixes Pt. 1)

1. "Systemagic" (Hannah Holland Remix) – 7:34
2. "Anymore" (Ralphi Rosario Tek Vocal Mix) – 7:01

"Systemagic" / "Anymore" (Remixes Pt. 2)

1. "Systemagic" (Ralphi Rosario Lunar Eclipse Mix) – 6:58
2. "Anymore" (Whatever/Whatever Remix by Justin Strauss & Bryan Mette) – 7:54

== Charts ==
Chart performance for "Anymore"
Chart (2017)	Peak position
Mexico Ingles Airplay (Billboard)	33
