= Excavation (The Haxan Cloak album) =

Studio album by The Haxan Cloak
- Released: 15 April 2013
- Genre: Electronic; drone; experimental; dark ambient; industrial
- Length: 51:34
- Label: Tri Angle

The Haxan Cloak chronology
The Haxan Cloak (2011)	Excavation (2013)

Excavation is the second studio album by English musician Bobby Krlic under the pseudonym The Haxan Cloak. It was released on 15 April 2013 through Tri Angle. It received universal acclaim from critics.

== Background ==
Excavation is The Haxan Cloak's second studio album, following The Haxan Cloak (2011). As for the album's concept, Bobby Krlic said, "The first record was about a person's decline towards death, so this one's about the journey he takes afterwards." The album is mastered by Matt Colton. The album's cover art features a photograph taken by Cody Cobb.

== Release ==
Excavation was released on 15 April 2013 internationally and 30 April 2013 in the United States through Tri Angle. Bobby Krlic later built his home studio in Los Angeles, regained the master tapes to his work from various record labels, and founded the record label Archaic Devices. The Haxan Cloak and Excavation were both reissued on 24 November 2023 through Archaic Devices.

== Critical reception ==
Professional ratings
Aggregate scores
Source	Rating
AnyDecentMusic?	8.0/10
Metacritic	84/100
Review scores
Source	Rating
AllMusic	4/5 stars
Clash	8/10
Consequence of Sound	4/5 stars
DIY	7/10
Exclaim!	10/10
Pitchfork	8.7/10
Resident Advisor	4.0/5
The Skinny	4/5 stars
Spin	9/10
XLR8R	8/10

According to the review aggregator Metacritic, Excavation received "universal acclaim" based on a weighted average score of 84 out of 100 from 16 critic scores.

Philip James de Vries of Exclaim! called the album "a brilliant piece of work, one best enjoyed actively with a premium set of headphones, in solitude." Nick Neyland of Pitchfork stated, "It's not aesthetically similar to Scott Walker's later works, but it similarly highlights how certain music specifically needs the right time, place, and mood to function." Brandon Bussolini of XLR8R commented that "Excavation treads, for the most part, the line between electro-acoustic experimentation for its own sake and more familiar shapes, although the beats remain too diffuse to put a label on."

=== Accolades ===
Year-end lists for Excavation
Publication	List	Rank	Ref.
Consequence	Top 50 Albums of 2013	46	
MusicOMH	Top 100 Albums of 2013	82	
Paste	The 50 Best Albums of 2013	40	
Pitchfork	The Top 50 Albums of 2013	29	
The Quietus	Quietus Albums of the Year 2013	14	
PopMatters	The 75 Best Albums of 2013	62	
Resident Advisor	Top 20 Albums of 2013	14	
Rolling Stone	20 Best Dance Albums of 2013	16	
Spin	50 Best Albums of 2013	14	
Under the Radar	Top 125 Albums of 2013	99	
XLR8R	Best Releases of 2013	16	

== Track listing ==
All tracks are written by Bobby Krlic.

Excavation track listing
No.	Title	Length
1.	"Consumed"	1:39
2.	"Excavation (Part 1)"	8:09
3.	"Excavation (Part 2)"	4:13
4.	"Mara"	3:13
5.	"Miste"	5:37
6.	"The Mirror Reflecting (Part 1)"	3:10
7.	"The Mirror Reflecting (Part 2)"	7:07
8.	"Dieu"	5:12
9.	"The Drop"	12:55
Total length:		51:34

== Personnel ==
Credits adapted from liner notes.

- Bobby Krlic – music
- Dr.Me – design
- Matt Colton – mastering
- Cody Cobb – photography

== Charts ==
Chart performance for Excavation
Chart (2013)	Peak position
UK Independent Album Breakers (OCC)	12
UK Official Record Store (OCC)	35
