= Wonderful Electric: Live in London =

Video by Goldfrapp
- Released: 27 September 2004
- Label: Mute
- Director: Mark Rainsforth; Richard Bell

Wonderful Electric: Live in London

EP by Goldfrapp
- Released: 27 September 2004
- Genre: Electronica, synthpop
- Length: 18:53
- Label: Mute
- Producer: Alison Goldfrapp; Will Gregory

Goldfrapp chronology
Black Cherry (2003)	Wonderful Electric: Live in London (2004)	Supernature (2005)

Wonderful Electric: Live in London is a video recording by English electronic music duo Goldfrapp. It was released on DVD on 27 September 2004 by Mute Records. A four-track extended play was released digitally on the same day.

== DVD track listing ==
Disc one: Live at Somerset House, 13 July 2003

1. "Deep Honey"
2. "Human"
3. "Lovely Head"
4. "Crystalline Green"
5. "Train"
6. "Utopia"
7. "Tiptoe"
8. "Deer Stop"
9. "Twist"
10. "Strict Machine"
11. "Pilots"
12. "Slippage"
13. "Yes Sir"
14. "Black Cherry"
15. "Twisted Summer" (documentary)

Disc two: Live at Shepherd's Bush Empire, 4 December 2001

1. "Paper Bag"
2. "Human"
3. "Deer Stop"
4. "Lovely Head"
5. "Pilots"
6. "Little Death"
7. "Felt Mountain"
8. "Utopia"
9. "U.K. Girls (Physical)"
10. "Sartorius"
11. "Horse Tears"
12. "Trip to Felt Mountain" (documentary)

== EP track listing ==
1. "Strict Machine" (Live from Somerset House) – 4:37
2. "Train" (Live from Somerset House) – 5:04
3. "Tiptoe" (Live from Somerset House) – 5:15
4. "Lovely Head" (Live from Shepherd's Bush Empire) – 3:57

== Charts ==
Chart (2004)	Peak position
UK Music Video DVD (OCC)	9
