= Ride a White Horse: Live in London E.P. =

EP by Goldfrapp
- Released: 13 February 2006
- Recorded: 6 October 2005
- Venue: Brixton Academy (London)
- Genre: Electroclash; electropop; synthpop
- Length: 17:13
- Label: Mute

Goldfrapp chronology
Supernature (2005)	Ride a White Horse: Live in London E.P. (2006)	We Are Glitter (2006)

Ride a White Horse: Live in London E.P. is the second extended play (EP) by English electronic music duo Goldfrapp. It was released digitally on 13 February 2006 by Mute Records.

== Track listing ==
No.	Title	Writer(s)	Length
1.	"Ride a White Horse" (Live)	Alison Goldfrapp; Will Gregory; Nick Batt	7:00
2.	"Number 1" (Live)	Goldfrapp; Gregory	4:04
3.	"Strict Machine" (Live)	Goldfrapp; Gregory; Batt	6:09
