= We Are Glitter =

Remix album by Goldfrapp
- Released: 17 October 2006
- Genre: Dance; electronic
- Length: 76:17
- Label: Mute
- Producer: Goldfrapp, Benny Benassi, Alan Braxe, Carl Craig, The DFA, The Flaming Lips, Fred Falke, François K, Eric Kupper, múm, Ewan Pearson, T. Raumschmiere, The Shortwave Set

Goldfrapp chronology
Supernature (2005)	We Are Glitter (2006)	Seventh Tree (2008)

Professional ratings
Review scores
Source	Rating
About.com	4/5 stars
Allmusic	3.5/5 stars
Pitchfork Media	7.2/10
PopMatters	7/10
Stylus Magazine	B

We Are Glitter is a remix album by English electronic duo Goldfrapp, released on 17 October 2006 by Mute Records. Initially released exclusively in North America, the album has since been released digitally worldwide. The album features remixes of songs from the band's third studio album, Supernature (2005), many of which were previously unavailable in North America.

== Chart performance ==
We Are Glitter debuted at number eight on the US Billboard Top Electronic Albums chart on 4 November 2006, spending four weeks on the chart. The album also peaked at number forty-eight on both the Billboard Top Heatseekers and Top Independent Albums charts.

== Track listing ==
All tracks are written by Alison Goldfrapp and Will Gregory, except where noted.

No.	Title	Writer(s)	Length
1.	"Satin Chic" (Bombay Mix by The Shortwave Set)		4:41
2.	"Lovely 2 C U" (T.Raumschmiere Rmx)		5:38
3.	"Ooh La La" (Benny Benassi Remix) (Extended)		6:52
4.	"You Never Know" (Múm Remix)		3:00
5.	"Satin Chic" (Through the Mystic Mix, Dimension 11 by The Flaming Lips)		3:21
6.	"Number 1" (Alan Braxe & Fred Falke Main Remix)		7:20
7.	"Fly Me Away" (C2 Rmx 4)		7:03
8.	"Ride a White Horse" (Ewan Pearson Disco Odyssey Pt. 1)	Goldfrapp; Gregory; Nick Batt	8:33
9.	"Number 1" (Múm Remix)		2:33
10.	"Ride a White Horse" (FK–EK Vocal Version)	Goldfrapp; Gregory; Batt	7:48
11.	"Slide In" (DFA Remix)		12:59
12.	"Strict Machine" (We Are Glitter)	Goldfrapp; Gregory; Batt	6:29

US iTunes Store bonus track
No.	Title	Length
13.	"Strict Machine" (Benny Benassi Sfaction Extended Mix)	6:50

== Personnel ==
- Alison Goldfrapp – vocals, synthesiser, producer, arranger, engineer (all tracks); remix (track 12); art direction
- Will Gregory – synthesiser, producer, arranger, engineer (all tracks); remix (track 12)
- Alle Benassi – remix (track 3)
- Benny Benassi – remix (tracks 3, 13)
- Alan Braxe – remix (track 6)
- Eric Broucek – assistant (track 11)
- Carl Craig – remix (track 7)
- The DFA – remix (track 11)
- The Flaming Lips – remix (track 5)
- Fred Falke – remix (track 6)
- Ted Jensen – mastering (track 12)
- François K – remix (track 10)
- Ross Kirton – photography
- Eric Kupper – keyboards, remix (track 10)
- Mat Maitland – art direction
- Mike Marsh – mastering (track 9)
- Kevin Metcalfe – mastering (track 11)
- Filippo Moscatello – additional programming (track 8)
- múm – remix (tracks 4, 9)
- Ewan Pearson – remix, engineer, mixing (track 8)
- Chris Potter – mastering (tracks 1–8, 10)
- T. Raumschmiere – remix (track 2)
- Rob Rives – drum programming (track 10)
- Gerard Saint – art direction
- The Shortwave Set – remix (track 1)

== Charts ==
Chart (2006)	Peak position
US Top Electronic Albums	8
US Top Heatseekers	48
US Top Independent Albums	48

== Release history ==
Region	Date	Label	Format(s)
North America	17 October 2006	Mute Records	CD, digital download
