= Number 1 (Goldfrapp song) =

2005 singly by Goldfrapp

Single by Goldfrapp

from the album Supernature
- B-side: "Beautiful"
- Released: 31 October 2005
- Recorded: 2004–2005
- Genre: Electroclash; new wave
- Length: 3:25
- Label: Mute
- Songwriters: Alison Goldfrapp; Will Gregory
- Producers: Alison Goldfrapp; Will Gregory

Goldfrapp singles chronology
"Ooh La La" (2005)	"Number 1" (2005)	"Ride a White Horse" (2006)

"Number 1" is a song by English electronic music duo Goldfrapp from their third studio album, Supernature (2005). Written and produced by Alison Goldfrapp and Will Gregory, the song features a synthesiser and bass guitar arrangement and was written about the importance and meaningfulness that somebody shares with another, despite that it might not necessarily last.

The song was released as the album's second single in October 2005 to positive reviews from music critics. It was a commercial success, reaching the top 40 on the majority of the charts it appeared, and topped the US Hot Dance Club Play chart. The song has been remixed a number of times and was featured in advertising campaigns for the US retail company Target.

== Background and writing ==
"Number 1" is a mid-tempo electronic love song about the importance and meaningfulness that somebody shares with another, despite that it might not necessarily last. The song was composed as a collaborative effort between Alison Goldfrapp and Will Gregory in late 2004 in the countryside of Bath, England. The song was written and recorded while Goldfrapp and Gregory were jamming in the recording studio, bouncing song ideas off each other. According to Goldfrapp, the song's lyrics are "a little bit more reflective and sensual" than those she had composed on Felt Mountain (2000) and Black Cherry (2003).

"Number 1" is written in the common verse–chorus form and features instrumentation from synthesisers and a bass guitar. It contains a synth and bass arrangement that the duo would use frequently on the rest of Supernature. Most of the song was composed on an old Roland String synth keyboard because Goldfrapp enjoyed the sounds that it exudes.

== Music video ==
The music video for "Number 1" was directed by Dawn Shadforth and filmed in London, England in 2005. The video is set in a plastic surgery clinic where the staff and the patients, except Alison Goldfrapp, have a dog's head and a human body. The video's theme is a reference to the song's lyrics in which Goldfrapp sings "I'm like a dog to get you". The video depicts the story of a white poodle who is being operated on by Great Dane and Yorkshire Terrier surgeons (the receptionist and attendant nurses are saluki). Scenes of Alison Goldfrapp acting like a dog and dancing with the clinic's staff are intercut throughout the video.

The video premiered in the UK in early October 2005. The complete version of "Number 1" featured in the music video has been released commercially through CD singles and digital downloads, and some include remixes by Alan Braxe and Fred Falke.

== Marketing and release ==
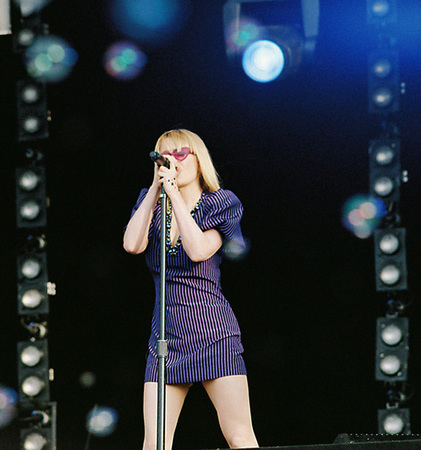
Alison Goldfrapp performing "Number 1" at the Wireless Festival in June 2006

In October 2005, Goldfrapp performed "Number 1" on British television shows and toured Europe, playing the single and other new songs. The duo performed only one concert in North America at the Nokia Theatre in New York City on 5 December 2005. The US concert sold out rapidly, which overwhelmed Goldfrapp who did not expect the large turnout. In late 2006, "Number 1" was featured in Christmas advertising campaigns for the US retail company Target. The song, along with "Fly Me Away", was featured in six winter-themed television commercials.

"Number 1" was released as a various formats throughout the world. In the United Kingdom, a CD single was distributed on 31 October 2005. While most territories received a CD single and digital download release, the single was also issued as a vinyl single in November 2005 in the UK. A DVD single was also issued and included the "Postcards from the Summer" music video and a special performance film for "Satin Chic".

== Critical reception ==
"Number 1" received positive reviews from music critics. Brad Reno of Trouser Press described the track as "especially strong, an uncanny impression of OMD if that band had been fronted by the head cheerleader instead of a science fair nerd." Critic James Masterton also drew parallels with OMD, praising the song's "subtle, haunting beauty" and finding it just as appealing as previous single "Ooh La La", albeit "in a very different way". MusicOMH's Michael Hubbard saw "Number 1" as a "warmer, calmer and cosier" track than "Ooh La La", and wrote that "it maintains those Numanoid synth riffs that Goldfrapp now do so well". AllMusic indicated the song as a 'track pick' from Supernature, commenting that it "nails the laid-back sexiness that many of the other slower songs attempt". Stylus Magazine gave the album a C+ rating but described "Number 1" as "refreshing and effective", while About.com wrote that the track was "a stunning profession of love served up over electronic burbles and bouncy bass."

God Is in the TV critic Jonathan Wright later placed "Number 1" among Goldfrapp's career highlights, observing "tender vocals" and a "straightforward pop" arrangement, and declaring the song an example of how the duo's "musical and lyrical ideas mesh together with ease". Wright revisited earlier comparisons to OMD and Gary Numan, noting a resemblance to the former's 1981 track, "She's Leaving".

== Commercial performance ==
"Number 1" entered the UK Singles Chart on 7 November 2005 at number nine, remaining on the chart for four weeks. Elsewhere, the song reached number 29 in Ireland and became Goldfrapp's second top-50 single on the singles chart. The song reached the top 40 in Italy and the top 100 in Germany.

In Canada, the song was released on 1 November 2005, reaching number 10 on the Canadian Singles Chart. Due to favourable reception, "Number 1" was released in the United States. Goldfrapp had previously found success in the dance clubs with "Strict Machine" (2003), and "Number 1" became their second consecutive release to reach the top of the Billboard Hot Dance Club Play chart. The song also reached number one on the Hot Dance Singles Sales chart and number eight on the Hot Singles Sales chart.

== Alternate versions ==
Alan Braxe and Fred Falke made the most well-known remix of the song, titled the "Alan Braxe and Fred Falke Main Mix", which was included on the CD single. The track, over seven minutes long, uses Goldfrapp's original vocals and features more prominent beats and synthesizers. The remix received mixed reviews from music critics. Stylus Magazine labeled it one of the "best club mixes", while Pop Journalism Magazine called the remix "dismal" and a poor choice. Braxe and Falk also created two other remixes, "Alan Braxe and Fred Falke Club Remix" and "Alan Braxe and Fred Falke Instrumental Remix", which appeared on the UK vinyl single. Icelandic electronic group Múm created the "Múm Remix", which provided the song with a minimalist ambient sound. The remix was included on Goldfrapp's remix album We Are Glitter in 2006, and the home console version of the dancing video game Dance Dance Revolution SuperNOVA 2 in 2007. A cover version by Jont appears on the 2007 compilation album, The Saturday Sessions: The Dermot O'Leary Show.

== Track listings ==
- CD single 1
1. "Number 1" – 3:25
2. "Beautiful" – 4:48
- CD single 2
1. "Number 1" (Alan Braxe & Fred Falke Main Remix) – 7:21
2. "Ooh La La" (Live)* – 4:37
3. "Number 1" (Video) – 3:29
- DVD single
1. "Number 1" (Postcards from the Summer) – 3:19
2. "Satin Chic" (Special Performance Film) – 3:26
3. "Lovely 2 C U" (T.Raumschmiere Rmx) (Audio) – 5:43
- *Recorded at V Festival, 21 August 2005.
- 12-inch single
1. "Number 1" (Alan Braxe & Fred Falke Club Remix) – 7:18
2. "Number 1" (Alan Braxe & Fred Falke Instrumental Remix) – 7:18
- Digital single (2019)
1. "Number 1" – 3:25
2. "Beautiful" – 4:49
3. "Number 1" (Alan Braxe & Fred Falke Main Remix) – 7:20
4. "Number 1" (Alan Braxe & Fred Falke Instrumental Remix) – 7:20
5. "Ooh La La" (Live)* – 4:34
6. "Lovely 2 C U" (T.Raumschmiere Rmx) – 5:38
7. "Lovely 2 C U" (T.Raumschmiere Instrumental Remix) – 5:36

== Credits and personnel ==
The following people contributed to "Number 1":

- Alison Goldfrapp – lead vocals, backing vocals, synthesizer
- Will Gregory – synthesizer
- Nick Batt – synthesizer, programming
- Dave Bascombe – vocal arrangement
- Mark "Spike" Stent – mixing
- Ted Jensen – mastering

== Charts ==
=== Weekly charts ===
Weekly chart performance for "Number 1"
Chart (2005–2006)	Peak position
Canada (Nielsen SoundScan)	10
Germany (GfK)	73
Ireland (IRMA)	29
Italy (FIMI)	37
Scottish Singles Sales (Official Charts)	6
Spain (Promusicae)	11
UK Singles (Official Charts)	9
US Dance Club Songs (Billboard)	1
US Dance Singles Sales (Billboard)	1
US Hot Singles Sales (Billboard)	8

=== Year-end charts ===
Year-end chart performance for "Number 1"
Chart (2006)	Position
US Dance Club Songs (Billboard)	43
US Dance Singles Sales (Billboard)	9

== See also ==
- List of number-one dance singles of 2006 (U.S.)
