= Supernature (Goldfrapp album) =

2005 studio album by Goldfrapp

Studio album by Goldfrapp
- Released: 17 August 2005
- Recorded: 2004–2005
- Studios: Angel Recording (London); Home studio (Somerset)
- Genres: Electroclash; electropop; synth-pop; dance-pop; glam rock
- Length: 43:12
- Label: Mute
- Producers: Alison Goldfrapp; Will Gregory

Goldfrapp chronology
Black Cherry (2003)	Supernature (2005)	We Are Glitter (2006)

Singles from Supernature
- 1. "Ooh La La" Released: 8 August 2005; 2. "Number 1" Released: 31 October 2005; 3. "Ride a White Horse" Released: 13 February 2006; 4. "Fly Me Away" Released: 1 May 2006

Supernature is the third studio album by English electronic music duo Goldfrapp, released on 17 August 2005 by Mute Records. The album received generally favourable reviews, with most critics complimenting its blend of pop and electronic music. It debuted at number two on the UK Albums Chart with first-week sales of 52,976 copies, and has been certified platinum by the British Phonographic Industry (BPI). Supernature has sold one million copies worldwide.

The album's lead single, "Ooh La La", reached number four on the UK Singles Chart, becoming the duo's highest-peaking single to date. The album spawned three further singles: "Number 1", "Ride a White Horse" and "Fly Me Away". In North America, where "Number 1" was promoted as the first single, the album was released on 7 March 2006 and reached number 138 on the Billboard 200 chart. Supernature was nominated for a Grammy Award for Best Electronic/Dance Album in 2007.

== Recording and production ==
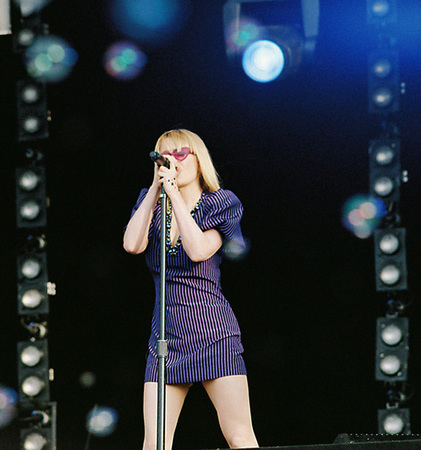
Alison Goldfrapp performing "Number 1" at the Wireless Festival in June 2006

Supernature contains music in the same pop and electronic dance styles featured on Goldfrapp's previous studio album, Black Cherry (2003)—especially its singles "Strict Machine" and "Twist"—although it focuses on subtle hooks instead of large choruses. Lead singer Alison Goldfrapp described the album's writing process as "an electronic/glam cross between Berlin, New York and North-East Somerset".

Goldfrapp and Will Gregory recorded the bulk of Supernature in late 2004 in the countryside near Bath, England—the same place they recorded Black Cherry. They had rented a small house and spent some months writing music; they later explained that the unpopulated location kept them from distractions and that the majority of the process was "very basic". Goldfrapp called their writing relationship a "democracy", playing off one another while in the recording studio. The lyrical content of the song "Number 1", which became the album's second single, is about the importance and meaning of relationships, even though they do not necessarily last.

In an interview with The Daily Telegraph, Goldfrapp explained that they had never intended to create pop music. However, the singles released from Black Cherry became successes across nightclubs in North America, and as a result, they decided to write a more dance-oriented album. Although this made the duo nervous, "Ooh La La" was the group's first song to feature the electric guitar. Before its composition, the duo avoided the use of the guitar because of the guitar's overly recognisable rhythm. Four-on-the-floor bass drums are also present on several of the album's tracks, and the piano ballad "Let It Take You" features evening-effects composed on a synthesiser. "You Never Know" begins with Alison Goldfrapp executing a synthesised voice, supported by both pads and synthesisers. Goldfrapp and Gregory have cited "Satin Chic" as their favourite song on Supernature.

Alison Goldfrapp named the Roland String synth as one of her favourite keyboards. "Number 1" features an old synth and a bass arrangement that the group began to use frequently after recording the song. She also favours another Roland keyboard, the SH-09 monophonic synthesiser first produced in 1979; she played the duo's song "Train" on it. Goldfrapp was also impressed by a Russian synth, enamored with its Russian writing.

== Composition and music ==
"Ooh La La", Supernature's opening track, inspired by T. Rex, was chosen as its lead single "because it was up and in your face and it carried on the theme of the glammy, discoey beat from the last album". It received positive reviews, often being noted as a highlight of the album. "Ooh La La" became Goldfrapp's most successful single on the UK Singles Chart to date when it peaked at number four, while topping the Billboard Hot Dance Club Play chart in the United States. The second track, "Lovely 2 C U", was compared to The Human League and Girls Aloud and received mixed reviews from critics, with one reviewer stating that it was the "worst offender of sounding by-numbers, its lazy glam affectations sounding all the worse amid a chorus striking only in its complete dullness".

"Ride a White Horse", the third single, was inspired by the disco era. Like previous singles from the album, the song was another top-20 single in the UK, where it peaked at number 15. The ballads "You Never Know" and "Let It Take You" have minimal background electronics, and were generally well received by critics, who drew comparisons to Goldfrapp's debut album Felt Mountain. Goldfrapp's performance on "You Never Know" was described as "chameleonic" with odes to Debbie Harry and Siouxsie Sioux. "Fly Me Away", another synth ballad, had an accompanying music video which featured Goldfrapp as an animated doll; the video, however, was never released. Serving as the fourth and final single from Supernature, the song was not heavily promoted and was less commercially successful than the other singles, peaking at number 26 on the UK chart. "Slide In", an electroclash song about sex, and "Koko" were compared to Gary Numan's early compositions.

"Satin Chic" is a disco song with glam rock and cabaret influences, similar to early Elton John. It was remixed by The Flaming Lips, and issued as a limited-edition single on 4 September 2006. The 10th track, "Time Out from the World", features an orchestra and whispered vocals by Goldfrapp. Critics liked the song, writing that it was an "exception to the prevailing style of Supernature" due to its "haunting, yet glamorous, atmospherics". The album's closing track and second single "Number 1" is about the importance and meanings of relationships. The song, which is based around a synth and bass arrangement, drew comparisons to OMD. It reached number nine on the UK Singles Chart and number one on the US Hot Dance Club Play chart.

== Release and artwork ==
The album was released in two versions: a single-disc version, which used Opendisc technology to offer extra contents via a website, and a double-disc version which included the album in surround sound on both discs. The first disc is a hybrid SACD with 5.1 multichannel SACD audio, stereo SACD audio and stereo CD audio. The second disc, a DVD-Video, contains the multichannel version of the album in DTS 96/24 as well as a documentary and music videos for "Ooh La La" and "Number 1".

The album cover, photographed by Ross Kirton, is a rear-view shot of Alison against a glittery black backdrop, looking over her shoulder while covering her breast with her hand. The regular edition cover shows her from the waist up, whereas the US special edition shows the cover art in its entirety, with Alison wearing a long plume of peacock feathers and golden platform shoes. In late 2005, the album ranked number eight on the annual Best Art Vinyl poll.

== Critical reception ==
Professional ratings
Aggregate scores
Source	Rating
Metacritic	79/100
Review scores
Source	Rating
AllMusic	4/5 stars
Blender	4/5 stars
Entertainment Weekly	B+
The Guardian	4/5 stars
Mojo	4/5 stars
NME	8/10
Pitchfork	7.0/10
Q	4/5 stars
Rolling Stone	3.5/5 stars
The Sunday Times	4/5 stars

Supernature received favourable reviews from music critics. At Metacritic, which assigns a normalised rating out of 100 to reviews from mainstream publications, the album received an average score of 79, based on 27 reviews. Dorian Lynskey of The Guardian said that the album was "a brash, beautiful celebration of love and dancing". In a review for PopMatters, Adrien Begrand said that "[a]lthough Supernature lacks the imagination of Felt Mountain and the saucy brilliance of Black Cherry, it doesn't pander to the pop crowd." Lauren Gitlin of Rolling Stone said the album was "[t]oxic and delicious" and that "Supernature will make you do bad things—and like it." However, Pitchfork reviewer Nitsuh Abebe was less impressed, and wrote that the album's songs "keep feeling like exercises: too thick and melodic to work like dance music, but with melodies that refuse to stick as satisfyingly as pop." Michael Hubbard of musicOMH wrote a review for every song on Supernature, and although he felt that it was a "curious, rather than classic, record", he criticised it for "fading out early on, with poor, low quality songs at the end which leave the listener feeling cheated". AllMusic critic Heather Phares called Supernature "Goldfrapp's most accessible album" and named "Ooh La La" as its best song.

Writing for NME, Hardeep Phull observed "streaks of numerous '80s electro-heroes" throughout Supernature, citing Gary Numan, New Order and Orchestral Manoeuvres in the Dark. He concluded, "Suave, sophisticated and sexy as hell, Goldfrapp have the musical know-how to awaken the darkest desires in women, men and Morrisseys alike." In a review for Canadian-based website Jam!, Andrew Carver praised the different sounds on Supernature, which range from "a blend of future noise" to "crushed velvet corruption"; he described the album as "one sharp recording". Jessica Suarez of Spin magazine compared "Ooh La La" to Black Cherry's "Strict Machine", saying that "Ooh La La" sounds "so simplistic that [its] minimalist repetition occasionally teeters over into redundancy". She praised "Ride a White Horse" and "Fly Me Away" for featuring Alison Goldfrapp's "velvet-soft vocals, which stay that way even when heavily processed". A less favourable reception came from Stylus Magazine reviewer Edward Oculicz, who stated "Supernature is not a great album" and called several of its tracks too "dull".

Rolling Stone magazine ranked the album at number 32 on its list of The Top 50 Albums of 2006. In January 2008, the album was included on The Daily Telegraph's list of the 120 essential pop albums. At the 2007 Grammy Awards, Goldfrapp received nominations for Best Electronic/Dance Album and Best Dance Recording for "Ooh La La".

== Commercial performance ==
Supernature debuted on the UK Albums Chart at number two (blocked from the top position by James Blunt's Back to Bedlam), selling 52,976 copies in its first week. The album was certified platinum by the British Phonographic Industry (BPI) on 13 January 2006. By 20 December 2010, the album had sold 500,000 copies in the United Kingdom. The album attained moderate success across Europe, reaching the top 10 in Ireland, the top 20 in Belgium, the top 30 in Germany and Switzerland, and the top 40 in Austria, Italy, the Netherlands and Norway. In Oceania, it peaked at number 23 in Australia and number 35 in New Zealand.

Supernature became Goldfrapp's first album to appear on the Billboard 200 in the United States, where it peaked at number 138. It reached number three on the Top Heatseekers chart and number five on the Top Electronic Albums chart. The album had sold 49,000 copies in the US as of August 2006. Supernature was also the duo's first release in Canada, reaching number 88 on the Canadian Albums Chart. The album had sold one million copies worldwide as of February 2008.

== Track listing ==
All tracks are written by Alison Goldfrapp and Will Gregory, except where noted.

No.	Title	Writer(s)	Length
1.	"Ooh La La"		3:24
2.	"Lovely 2 C U"		3:25
3.	"Ride a White Horse"	Goldfrapp; Gregory; Nick Batt	4:41
4.	"You Never Know"		3:27
5.	"Let It Take You"		4:30
6.	"Fly Me Away"		4:25
7.	"Slide In"		4:17
8.	"Koko"		3:23
9.	"Satin Chic"		3:28
10.	"Time Out from the World"		4:47
11.	"Number 1"		3:25
Total length:			43:12

Japanese and North American edition bonus track
No.	Title	Length
12.	"Beautiful"	4:49
Total length:		48:03

Digital edition bonus tracks
No.	Title	Length
12.	"Beautiful"	4:49
13.	"Lovely 2 C U" (T.Raumschmiere Rmx)	5:38
Total length:		53:39

European special edition bonus DVD

1. Supernature in 5.1 & Stereo
2. Little Bits of Goldfrapp: Documentary
3. Jakko & the Poet in Frappworld – animation by Andreas Nilsson
4. Photo gallery

US special edition bonus DVD

1. Supernature in 5.1 & Stereo (excluding bonus track "Beautiful")
2. Little Bits of Goldfrapp: Documentary
3. Jakko & the Poet in Frappworld – animation by Andreas Nilsson
4. "Ooh La La" (video)
5. "Number 1" (video)
6. "Ride a White Horse" (live in London)
7. "Satin Chic" (special performance film)
8. "Ooh La La": Little Pictures
9. Photo gallery

=== 2025: 20th anniversary deluxe edition ===
To mark the 20th anniversary of the original release, an expanded deluxe edition of the album was released on 21 November 2025.

2025 reissue disc 1: Original album plus extra track
No.	Title	Length
1.	"Ooh La La"	3:24
2.	"Lovely 2 C U"	3:25
3.	"Ride a White Horse"	4:42
4.	"You Never Know"	3:28
5.	"Let It Take You"	4:27
6.	"Fly Me Away"	4:26
7.	"Slide In"	4:17
8.	"Koko"	3:24
9.	"Satin Chic"	3:27
10.	"Time Out from the World"	4:48
11.	"Number 1"	3:25
12.	"Beautiful"	4:51

2025 reissue disc 2: B-Sides, Remixes & Rarities
No.	Title	Length
1.	"Ooh La La" (Benny Benassi Remix) (Extended)	6:52
2.	"Beautiful" (Richard X Rework)	3:39
3.	"You Never Know" (Goldfrapp Remix)	4:05
4.	"Koko" (Sun's Signature Remix)	5:33
5.	"Ride a White Horse" (FK–EK Vocal Version)	7:48
6.	"Lovely 2 C U" (T.Raumschmiere Rmx)	5:38
7.	"Slide In" (DFA Remix Edit)	5:25
8.	"Let It Take You" (Goldfrapp Remix)	4:35
9.	"All Night Operator (Pt. 1)"	4:00
10.	"Time Out from the World" (Fields Remix)	6:02
11.	"You Never Know" (Múm Remix)	3:00
12.	"Satin Chic" (Through the Mystic Mix, Dimension 11 by The Flaming Lips)	3:21
13.	"Ooh La La" (Live on Later with Jools Holland)	3:58
14.	"Ride a White Horse" (Live on Jools' Annual Hootenanny)	3:47
15.	"Fly Me Away" (Live on Jo Whiley's Live Lounge)	4:19
16.	"Satin Chic" (Live on Later with Jools Holland)	3:37
17.	"Number 1" (Live on the Mark Radcliffe Show)	3:31

2025 reissue disc 3: (Blu-ray - audio only) Supernature - 5.1 Surround Sound Mix
No.	Title	Length
1.	"Ooh La La"	3:24
2.	"Lovely 2 C U"	3:25
3.	"Ride a White Horse"	4:42
4.	"You Never Know"	3:28
5.	"Let It Take You"	4:27
6.	"Fly Me Away"	4:26
7.	"Slide In"	4:17
8.	"Koko"	3:24
9.	"Satin Chic"	3:27
10.	"Time Out from the World"	4:48
11.	"Number 1"	3:25
12.	"Beautiful"	4:51

== Personnel ==
Credits adapted from the liner notes of Supernature.

=== Goldfrapp ===
- Alison Goldfrapp – vocals, arrangements, synths
- Will Gregory – arrangements, synths

=== Additional musicians ===
- Charlie Jones – bass (tracks 1–3, 6, 7)
- Adrian Utley – guitar (tracks 1, 9); bass (track 9)
- Nick Batt – synth (tracks 1, 3, 4, 8, 11); additional programming (tracks 1–4, 6–11)
- Daniel Miller – synth (track 3)
- Dave Power – additional drums (track 3)
- Ewan Pearson – additional programming (track 3)
- Nick Ingman – string orchestration, string conducting
- Gavyn Wright – string leader

=== Technical ===
- Alison Goldfrapp – recording, production
- Will Gregory – recording, production
- Mark "Spike" Stent – mixing (tracks 1–4, 6–8, 11)
- Jeremy Wheatley – mixing (tracks 9, 10)
- David Bascombe – mixing (track 5); vocal arrangement mixing (track 11)
- Alex Dromgoole – engineering assistance (tracks 1–4, 6–8, 11)
- David Emery – engineering assistance (tracks 1–4, 6–8, 11)
- Richard Edgeler – engineering assistance (tracks 9, 10)
- Tim Roe – engineering assistance (tracks 5, 11)
- Steve Evans – additional recording engineering (track 3)
- Lee Groves – additional mix programming (tracks 1–4, 7)
- Gary Thomasat – recording
- Mat Bartram – engineering assistance
- Ted Jensen – mastering

=== Artwork ===
- Alison Goldfrapp – art direction
- Mat Maitland – art direction, design
- Gerard Saint – art direction
- Rachel Thomas – set design
- Ross Kirton – photography
- Danny Emmett – digital imaging

== Charts ==
=== Weekly charts ===
Weekly chart performance for Supernature
Chart (2005–2006)	Peak position
Australian Albums (ARIA)	23
Austrian Albums (Ö3 Austria)	33
Belgian Albums (Ultratop Flanders)	16
Belgian Albums (Ultratop Wallonia)	22
Canadian Albums (Nielsen SoundScan)	88
Dutch Albums (Album Top 100)	36
European Albums (Billboard)	6
French Albums (SNEP)	43
German Albums (Offizielle Top 100)	26
Irish Albums (IRMA)	9
Italian Albums (FIMI)	36
New Zealand Albums (RMNZ)	35
Norwegian Albums (VG-lista)	36
Scottish Albums (Official Charts)	8
Spanish Albums (Promusicae)	50
Swiss Albums (Schweizer Hitparade)	29
UK Albums (Official Charts)	2
US Billboard 200	138
US Top Dance Albums (Billboard)	5

=== Year-end charts ===
2005 year-end chart performance for Supernature
Chart (2005)	Position
UK Albums (OCC)	76

2006 year-end chart performance for Supernature
Chart (2006)	Position
UK Albums (OCC)	112
US Top Dance/Electronic Albums (Billboard)	12

== Certifications and sales ==
Certifications and sales for Supernature
Region	Certification	Certified units/sales
Ireland (IRMA)	Gold	7,500^{^}
United Kingdom (BPI)	Platinum	500,000
Summaries
Worldwide	—	1,000,000
^{^} Shipments figures based on certification alone.

== Release history ==
Release dates and formats for Supernature
Region	Date	Format	Label	Ref(s)
Japan	17 August 2005	CD; digital download	EMI	
France	18 August 2005	Special edition CD + DVD	Labels	
Netherlands	18 August 2005	CD; special edition CD + DVD	EMI	
Netherlands	22 August 2005	Digital download	Mute	
Australia	22 August 2005	Digital download	Mute	
France	22 August 2005	Digital download	Mute	
Germany	22 August 2005	CD; digital download; special edition CD + DVD	Mute	
United Kingdom	22 August 2005	CD; LP; digital download; special edition CD + DVD	Mute	
France	23 August 2005	CD	Labels	
Australia	26 August 2005	CD	EMI	
United Kingdom	5 December 2005	UMD	Mute	
Germany	13 December 2005	UMD	EMI	
Canada	21 February 2006	Digital download	EMI	
Canada	7 March 2006	CD	EMI	
United States	7 March 2006	CD; digital download; special edition CD + DVD	Mute	
