= Fly Me Away (song) =

2006 single by Goldfrapp

Single by Goldfrapp

from the album Supernature
- B-side: "Satin Chic" (Bombay Mix by The Shortwave Set)
- Released: 1 May 2006
- Genre: Electroclash
- Length: 4:25 (album version); 3:37 (single version)
- Label: Mute
- Songwriters: Alison Goldfrapp, Will Gregory
- Producers: Goldfrapp, Gregory

Goldfrapp singles chronology
"Ride a White Horse" (2006)	"Fly Me Away" (2006)	"Satin Boys, Flaming Chic" (2006)

"Fly Me Away" is an electronic song performed by British group Goldfrapp. The song was written and produced by Alison Goldfrapp and Will Gregory for the duo's third album Supernature (2005). The song features a synthesizer and orchestral arrangement and was written about the need to escape from the troubles of daily life.

The song was released as the album's fourth single in May 2006 to positive reviews from music critics. It was a modest commercial success, reaching the top forty in Ireland and the United Kingdom. The song has been remixed a number of times and was featured in advertising campaigns for the US retail company Target.

== Background and writing ==
"Fly Me Away" is a mid-tempo electronic song about the need to escape from the troubles of daily life. It was composed as a collaborative effort between Alison Goldfrapp and Will Gregory in late 2004 in a rented cottage in the countryside of Bath, England. The song was written and recorded while Goldfrapp and Gregory were "jamming in the recording studio, bouncing song ideas off each other". "Fly Me Away" is written in the common verse-chorus form and features instrumentation from synthesizers and an orchestra that was conducted by Nick Ingman.

The North American digital EP featured a cover version of "Boys Will Be Boys" as its B-side. The song was originally performed by British rock group The Ordinary Boys.

== Marketing and release ==
In late 2006, "Fly Me Away" was featured in Christmas advertising campaigns for the US retail company Target. The song, along with "Number 1", was featured in winter themed television commercials. An instrumental of the song was also featured in advertisements for L'Oréal Feria, which starred actress Scarlett Johansson.

"Fly Me Away" was released as a various formats throughout the world. While most territories received a CD single and digital download release, the single was released as a limited edition 12-inch single in April 2006 in the UK. A DVD single was also issued and included the "Fly Me Away: Inflight Movies (Paris - New York - London)" film, directed by Hannah Holland, and Diane Martel's music video for "Ride A White Horse".

The Chris Hopewell-directed music video for "Fly Me Away" was never released. Clips from the video have, however, leaked on to the internet, appearing on the video sharing website YouTube. Instead, Goldfrapp released a performance video on their MySpace page and an animated short film version, directed by Andreas Nilsson and titled "Jakko & the Poet in Frappworld", on the Supernature Limited Edition DVD.

== Chart performance ==
"Fly Me Away" was released in the United Kingdom on 1 May 2006. Because it was released as the fourth single, success was very limited since many consumers had already purchased the album, which at the time had been certified platinum in the UK. The song entered the UK Singles Chart on 8 May 2006 at number twenty-six. The following week it dropped thirty-five positions to number sixty-one and exited the singles chart in its third week of release. In Ireland, the song entered at number forty, remaining on the singles chart for one week. In the US, "Fly My Away" became Goldfrapp's fourth song to chart within the top ten of the Billboard Dance Chart, reaching number six.

== Remixes ==
Carl Craig made the most well-known remix of the song, titled the "C2 rmx 4", which was included on the limited edition CD single. The track uses Goldfrapp's original vocals over a heavy bass line and layered synths. Craig also created two other C2 remixes, which focus on Gregory's instrumentation. Ladytron's remix of "Fly Me Away" remained close to the original, but was called less "fun and bouncy" by About.com reviewer Mike Stier. Stier also disliked Filippo Moscatello's "Naughty rmx" writing that it did not contain the "zest and zing" that Craig's remixes had.

== Formats and track listings ==
These are the formats and track listings of major single releases of "Fly Me Away".

- CD single 1
1. "Fly Me Away" (Single Version) – 3:37
2. "Satin Chic" (Bombay Mix by The Shortwave Set) – 4:40
- CD single 2
1. "Fly Me Away" (C2 Remix 4) – 7:04
2. "Fly Me Away" (Ladytron Remix) – 5:27
3. "You Never Know" (Múm Remix) – 2:59
- DVD single
1. "Fly Me Away: Inflight Movies (Paris – New York – London)" – 3:10
2. "Ride a White Horse" (Video) – 3:15
3. "Time Out from the World" (Fields Remix) (Audio) – 6:01
- 12-inch single
1. "Fly Me Away" (C2 Remix 1) – 7:24
2. "Fly Me Away" (C2 Remix 2) – 7:16
3. "Slide In" (DFA Remix) – 12:59
- Digital single (2019)
1. "Fly Me Away" (Single Version) — 3:37
2. "Satin Chic" (Bombay Mix by The Shortwave Set) – 4:40
3. "Fly Me Away" (C2 Rmx 4) – 7:02
4. "Fly Me Away" (Ladytron Remix) – 5:26
5. "You Never Know" (Múm Remix) – 2:59
6. "Time Out from the World" (Fields Remix) – 6:01
7. "Slide In" (DFA Remix) – 12:59
8. "Fly Me Away" (C2 Rmx 1) – 7:24
9. "Fly Me Away" (C2 Rmx 2) – 7:16
10. "Fly Me Away" (Ladytron Dub) – 5:26
11. "Fly Me Away" (The Naughty Rmx) – 6:28

== Personnel ==
The following people contributed to Fly Me Away:

- Alison Goldfrapp – lead vocals, backing vocals, synthesizer
- Nick Batt – synthesizer, programming
- Will Gregory – synthesizer
- Mark "Spike" Stent – mixing
- Ted Jensen – mastering

== Charts ==
Weekly chart performance for "Fly Me Away"
Chart (2006)	Peak position
Ireland (IRMA)	40
Scotland (OCC)	15
UK Singles (OCC)	26
US Dance Club Songs (Billboard)	6
