= J. R. Norton =

J.R. Norton (a.k.a. James Norton) is a former Middle East editor for The Christian Science Monitor, and was research director for The Al Franken Show. His work has been published in the Progressive and Salon, among other publications, including Saving General Washington. He is co-author of the 2009 book The Master Cheesemakers of Wisconsin and author of the 2014 book Lake Superior Flavors.

He resides in Minneapolis.

He is the founder of Flak Magazine, an online publication devoted to cultural criticism. He is the cofounder and editor of The Heavy Table, a food and beverage site turned newsletter covering the Upper Midwest of the United States. He has been a contributor to the Washington Post, McSweeney's, Chowhound, and is a regular contributor and speaker in numerous publications and radio programs.
