= Ooh La La (Goldfrapp song) =

2005 single by Goldfrapp

Single by Goldfrapp

from the album Supernature
- B-side: "All Night Operator (Part 1)"
- Released: 8 August 2005
- Genre: Synth-pop; glam rock; disco
- Length: 3:24
- Label: Mute
- Songwriters: Alison Goldfrapp; Will Gregory
- Producers: Alison Goldfrapp; Will Gregory

Goldfrapp singles chronology
"Black Cherry" (2004)	"Ooh La La" (2005)	"Number 1" (2005)

"Ooh La La" is a song by English electronic music duo Goldfrapp from their third studio album, Supernature (2005). Written and produced by Alison Goldfrapp and Will Gregory, the song consists largely of a synthesiser and guitar arrangement, and has been described as "a dirty, decadent homage to Marc Bolan".

The song was released as the album's lead single in August 2005 to positive reviews from music critics. It was a commercial success, reaching the top 40 on the majority of the charts it appeared, and topped the United States dance chart. The song has been remixed a number of times and was nominated for Best Dance Recording at the 49th Grammy Awards in 2007.

== Background and writing ==
"Ooh La La"
A 20-second sample of "Ooh La La", illustrating its usage of synthesisers and bass guitar. The "clattering" keyboard, which Will Gregory described as "like horses galloping", can be heard during the chorus.

Goldfrapp began work on "Ooh La La" in late 2004 in a small rented house in the countryside of Bath, England. The song was composed as a collaborative effort between Alison Goldfrapp and Will Gregory while jamming in the recording studio, bouncing song ideas off each other. Goldfrapp contributed the song's lyrics, and has described the song as being "sulky, sexual and a bit ambiguous". In "Ooh La La", she confesses to wanting only a sexual relationship without romance.

"Ooh La La" was Goldfrapp's first song to feature the electric guitar, an instrument that they had avoided due to its overly recognisable rhythm. When they recorded the song, Gregory played the keyboard bass as Goldfrapp sang. Her microphone picked up the "clattering" of Gregory's pressing the keys, which they added to the chorus; Gregory described the sound as "like horses galloping". The song is written in the common verse-chorus form and features additional instrumentation from synthesisers and a bass guitar.

The song has been compared to Norman Greenbaum's 1969 song "Spirit in the Sky", Juana Molina's 2003 song "Sonamos" and Rachel Stevens' 2004 song "Some Girls" (itself heavily influenced by Goldfrapp's own "Strict Machine"). Gregory noted that comparisons to Greenbaum were made when the duo released the song "Train" in 2003, adding that the two tracks share the same glam swing. Goldfrapp rejected comparisons to Stevens, stating that "Some Girls" was "very bland".

== Critical reception ==
"Ooh La La" received positive reviews from music critics. MusicOMH.com reviewer Michael Hubbard described the song as "sensational", writing that "Ooh La La" "will spawn a million remixes, and deservedly so". Heather Phares of AllMusic named "Ooh La La" as the best song from Supernature. Jessica Suarez of Spin magazine compared "Ooh La La" with Black Cherry's "Strict Machine", saying that the song sounds "so simplistic that [its] minimalist repetition occasionally teeters over into redundancy". PopMatters also compared the two songs, but wrote that the "gimmick remains something they do incredibly well, and when the chorus kicks in, Alison lala-ing away, it's impossible not to give in".

Rolling Stone magazine included the song in its list of the top hundred songs of 2006, ranking it at number ten. At the 2007 Grammy Awards, the song was nominated for Best Dance Recording, losing out to Justin Timberlake's "SexyBack".

== Release and commercial performance ==
"Ooh La La" was chosen as the album's lead single "because it was up and in your face and it carried on the theme of the glammy, discoey beat from the last album". The song was released on various formats throughout the world. While most territories received a CD and download release, in the UK the single was additionally released on DVD and limited edition 12" vinyl. The DVD single included the music video for "Ooh La La" and a short documentary titled "Little Pictures".

"Ooh La La" entered the UK Singles Chart on 14 August 2005 at number 4, remaining on the chart for 13 weeks. It finished as the 91st best-selling single of 2005 in the United Kingdom. Elsewhere, the single reached number one in Spain, number 16 in Ireland, and number 36 in Australia. In North America, "Ooh La La" was released as the album's second single in February 2006. In the United States, the song became Goldfrapp's third consecutive release to reach the top of the Billboard Hot Dance Club Play chart. The song also reached number three on the Hot Dance Airplay chart.

== Music video ==
The music video for "Ooh La La" was directed by Dawn Shadforth. Inspired by "glam rock '70s TV", the video features Goldfrapp, dressed in all black with leather gigot sleeves, and a backing band (not portrayed by her regular live musicians) performing in a large green room. Scenes of Alison Goldfrapp riding on a digital sparkling horse are intercut toward the end of the video. Alison Goldfrapp has described the video as "harking back to Eno-era Roxy Music and old Top of the Pops". The complete version of "Ooh La La" featured in the music video has been released commercially through CD singles and digital downloads, and some include remixes by Benny Benassi, Tiefschwarz, and Andy Bell.

== Track listings ==
- CD single 1
1. "Ooh La La" (Single Version) – 3:00
2. "All Night Operator (Part 1)" – 4:00
- CD single 2
1. "Ooh La La" (Benny Benassi Remix) (Extended) – 6:53
2. "Ooh La La" (Phones Re-Edit) – 6:31
3. "Ooh La La" (Tiefschwarz Dub) – 6:39
- DVD single
1. "Ooh La La" (Video) – 3:20
2. "Ooh La La" (Little Pictures) – 2:43
3. "Ooh La La" (When Andy Bell Met Manhattan Clique Mix) (Audio) – 6:20
- 12-inch single 1
1. "Ooh La La" (Original Extended Mix) – 5:12
2. "Ooh La La" (Phones Re-Edit) – 6:29
- 12-inch single 2
1. "Ooh La La" (Benny Benassi Remix) (Extended) – 6:50
2. "Ooh La La" (Benny Benassi Dub) – 6:28
3. "Ooh La La" (Tiefschwarz Dub) – 6:36
- Digital single (2019)
1. "Ooh La La" (Single Version) – 2:57
2. "All Night Operator (Pt. 1)" – 3:59
3. "Ooh La La" (Extended Mix) – 5:14
4. "Ooh La La" (Benny Benassi Remix) (Extended) – 6:52
5. "Ooh La La" (Benny Benassi Dub) – 6:30
6. "Ooh La La" (Phones Re-edit) – 6:31
7. "Ooh La La" (Tiefschwarz Dub) – 6:38
8. "Ooh La La" (When Andy Bell Met Manhattan Clique Remix) – 6:20
9. "Ooh La La" (Peter Rauhofer Reconstruction Mix) – 9:13

== Personnel ==
The following people contributed to "Ooh La La":

- Alison Goldfrapp – lead vocals, backing vocals, synthesizer
- Nick Batt – synthesizer, programming
- Will Gregory – synthesizer
- Adrian Utley – guitar
- Charlie Jones – bass
- Mark "Spike" Stent – mixing
- Ted Jensen – mastering

== Charts ==
=== Weekly charts ===
2005–2006 weekly chart performance for "Ooh La La"
Chart (2005–2006)	Peak position
Australia (ARIA)	36
Belgium (Ultratip Bubbling Under Flanders)	12
Europe (Eurochart Hot 100)	16
France (SNEP)	135
Germany (GfK)	82
Greece (IFPI)	27
Ireland (IRMA)	16
Italy (FIMI)	37
Scottish Singles Sales (Official Charts)	3
Spain (Promusicae)	1
Switzerland (Schweizer Hitparade)	96
UK Singles (Official Charts)	4
US Dance Club Songs (Billboard)	1
US Dance Airplay (Billboard)	3

2013 weekly chart performance for "Ooh La La"
Chart (2013)	Peak position
US Hot Dance/Electronic Songs (Billboard)	25

=== Year-end charts ===
2005 year-end chart performance for "Ooh La La"
Chart (2005)	Position
UK Singles (OCC)	91

2006 year-end chart performance for "Ooh La La"
Chart (2006)	Position
US Hot Dance Club Play (Billboard)	28

== Certifications ==
Certifications and sales for "Ooh La La"
Region	Certification	Certified units/sales
United Kingdom (BPI)	Silver	200,000^{‡}
^{‡} Sales+streaming figures based on certification alone.

== Release history ==
Release dates and formats for "Ooh La La"
Region	Date	Format(s)	Label(s)	Ref.
United Kingdom	8 August 2005	12-inch vinyl; CD; DVD	Mute	
Australia	15 August 2005	CD	Mute	
United States	27 February 2006	Contemporary hit radio	Mute	
