= Human (Goldfrapp song) =

2001 song by Goldfrapp

Single by Goldfrapp

from the album Felt Mountain
- Released: 26 February 2001
- Recorded: 1999–2000
- Length: 4:36 (album version); 3:44 (single version)
- Label: Mute
- Songwriters: Alison Goldfrapp, Will Gregory, Tim Norfolk, Bob Locke
- Producers: Alison Goldfrapp, Will Gregory

Goldfrapp singles chronology
"Utopia" (2000)	"Human" (2001)	"Utopia (Genetically Enriched)" (2001)

"Human" is a song by British electronic music duo Goldfrapp. The song was written by the group with Startled Insects' Tim Norfolk and Bob Locke, and produced by Alison Goldfrapp and Will Gregory for the duo's debut album Felt Mountain (2000). "Human" is the only track on Felt Mountain with additional songwriters. It was released as the album's third single on 26 February 2001 and reached number 87 on the UK Singles Chart.

The song was sampled by American rapper Kanye West for his track "Freestyle 4". The song was used for credits in UK ITV release of tv series Wire in the Blood (omitted in international and most home video releases). It was also used in the closing credits of the second and third seasons of the French spy show The Bureau.

== Critical response ==
"Human" received generally positive reviews from pop music critics. Flak Magazine reviewer Eric Wittmershaus called the song a "surprisingly-daring-yet-easy-to-listen-to genre-bender" that "is easily the disc's standout track." Sacha Esterson of Musicomh.com described the track as "middle eastern-influenced upbeat gem" that is "particularly fantastic." NME wrote that "Human" "sounds like Shirley Bassey, but with none of the dance nous the Welsh warbler brought to her collaboration with the Propellerheads."

== Formats and track listings ==
- CD single
1. "Human" (Single Version) – 3:44
2. "Human" (Calexico Vocal) – 4:50
3. "Human" (Massey's Cro-Magnon Mix) – 5:54
- 12-inch single
1. "Human" (Single Version) – 3:44
2. "Human" (Calexico Instrumental) – 4:48
3. "Human" (Massey's Neanderthal Mix) – 7:27

- Digital single (2018)
1. "Human" (Single Version) – 3:43
2. "Human" (Calexico Vocal) – 4:49
3. "Human" (Massey's Cro-Magnon Mix) – 5:53
4. "Human" (Calexico Instrumental) – 4:47
5. "Human" (Massey's Neanderthal Mix) – 7:29

== Charts ==
Chart (2001)	Peak position
UK Singles (Official Charts)	87
UK Indie (Official Charts)	18
