= The Debt Collection =

Studio album by The Shortwave Set
- Released: July 2005
- Label: Independiente

The Shortwave Set chronology
The Debt Collection (2005)	Replica Sun Machine (2008)

Professional ratings
Review scores
Source	Rating
OMM	4/5 stars
Stylus Magazine	A

The Debt Collection is the debut album by The Shortwave Set, released in July 2005 on Independiente Records. The album encompasses what the band described as their "Victorian Funk" period.

== Track listing ==
1. "Slingshot" (4:00)
2. "Sven Rokk" (0:40)
3. "Is it any Wonder?" (4:27)
4. "Better Than Bad" (2:10)
5. "Repeat to Fade" (3:51)
6. "Heap of Other" (0:35)
7. "Roadside" (3:27)
8. "Head to Fill" (4:05)
9. "Figures of 62" (2:39)
10. "Just goes to Show" (4:07)
11. "In Your Debt" (7:32)
12. "Yr Room" (2:45)
