= Black Cherry (Goldfrapp song) =

Single by Goldfrapp

from the album Black Cherry
- B-side: "Gone to Earth"
- Released: 1 March 2004
- Recorded: 2002 (Bath, England)
- Genre: Chill-out; dance-pop
- Length: 4:56 (album version); 3:54 (single mix)
- Label: Mute
- Songwriters: Alison Goldfrapp, Will Gregory
- Producers: Alison Goldfrapp, Will Gregory

Goldfrapp singles chronology
"Twist" (2003)	"Black Cherry" (2004)	"Ooh La La" (2005)

Alternative cover
- CD2 cover

"Black Cherry" is a song by British electronic music duo Goldfrapp. The song was written and produced by Alison Goldfrapp and Will Gregory for their second studio album, Black Cherry (2003). The song was released as the album's fourth single in March 2004 to positive reviews from music critics. It was a modest commercial success, reaching the top thirty in the United Kingdom and on the United States Hot Dance Singles Sales chart.

== Background and reception ==
Goldfrapp began work on "Black Cherry" in 2002 in a darkened studio in the countryside of Bath, England. Alison Goldfrapp contributed the song's lyrics, which she described as "personal stuff"; in subsequent interviews, she would not elaborate on the song's meaning.

"Black Cherry" received positive reviews from music critics. In a review for About.com, Wes May described the song as "lush" due to Goldfrapp's "endearingly chirpy vocals". MusicOMH reviewer Helen Wright called the track "blissful" because of its "plaintive strings, spaced-out melodies and soaring over everything, the unmistakable voice of Alison Goldfrapp". The CD single featured the B-side "Gone to Earth". The song was described by MusicOMH as a "treat" because of its "slightly oriental..off-key piano intro" that "turns into the most ethereal chill out music imaginable".

== Formats and track listings ==
- CD single #1
1. "Black Cherry" (Single Mix) – 3:55
2. "Gone to Earth" – 3:23
- CD single #2
1. "Black Cherry" (M83 Remix) – 4:05
2. "Twist" (Kurtis Mantronik's Twist & Vac Mix) – 6:47
3. "Black Cherry" (Live in London) (Video)* – 5:04
4. "Twist" (Video) – 3:37
- DVD single
1. "Black Cherry" (Lawrence Remix) – 6:41
2. "Strict Machine (Video) – 3:40
3. "Utopia" (Live in London) (Video)** – 5:06
4. "Utopia" (Tom Middleton Cosmos Acid Dub Edit) – 4:23
- Digital single (2018)
1. "Black Cherry" (Single Mix) – 3:54
2. "Gone to Earth" – 3:22
3. "Black Cherry" (M83 Remix) – 4:03
4. "Black Cherry" (Lawrence Remix) – 6:38
5. "Twist" (Kurtis Mantronik's Twist and Vac Mix) – 6:46
- *Filmed at Somerset House, 13 July 2003.
- **Filmed at Shepherd's Bush Empire, 4 December 2001.

== Personnel ==
The following people contributed to "Black Cherry":

- Alison Goldfrapp – lead vocals, backing vocals, synthesizer, mixing
- Will Gregory – synthesizer, mixing
- Nick Batt – synthesizer, programming
- Rowan Oliver – drum programming
- Tom Elmhirst – mixing
- John Dent – mastering

== Charts ==
Chart (2004)	Peak position
Scotland Singles (OCC)	27
UK Singles (OCC)	28
US Dance Singles Sales (Billboard)	15
