= Twist (Goldfrapp song) =

2003 song by Goldfrapp

Single by Goldfrapp

from the album Black Cherry
- B-side: "Yes Sir"
- Released: 3 November 2003
- Genre: Electropop; dance-pop
- Length: 3:32
- Label: Mute
- Songwriter(s): Alison Goldfrapp; Will Gregory
- Producer(s): Alison Goldfrapp; Will Gregory

Goldfrapp singles chronology
"Strict Machine" (2003)	"Twist" (2003)	"Black Cherry" (2004)

"Twist" is a song by English electronic music duo Goldfrapp from their second studio album, Black Cherry (2003). It was released on 3 November 2003 as the album's third single. The song received positive reviews from music critics and was a minor success in the United Kingdom, peaking at number 31 on the UK Singles Chart. In the United States, the single reached number 18 on Billboard's Hot Dance Singles Sales chart.

== Composition ==
In an interview with New Beats, Alison Goldfrapp described the genesis of the song:

It's a sort of sexual fantasy that I had about a boy who worked at the fairground, who I lusted after. He was in control and I wasn't cause I was sat on the waltzer and he was the one that was spinning it around and—I don't know—it's sort of lust, adolescent, awakening, smells and noise and dirt. That's what "Twist" is about.

"Twist" has been described as electropop and dance-pop, and features a "danceable groove" with "operatically orgasmic vocals". The song has been noted for its overly sexual theme, showcasing the duo's change of direction following Felt Mountain.

== Release ==
"Twist" was released as the third single from Black Cherry on the 3rd November 2003. Despite being a single, it was omitted from the duo's 2012 compilation album The Singles.

== Critical reception ==
"Twist" was generally received well by critics. Writing for The Guardian, Alexis Petridis stated that the track "boasts such a winning chorus it's impossible not to be impressed." AllMusic was more mixed, with Heather Phares writing that the song "overplays its hand by adding too many buzzing synths", though praised the song's groove and Goldfrapp's vocal range.

== Track listings ==
- CD1
1. "Twist" (Single Mix) – 3:33
2. "Yes Sir" – 3:57
3. "Deer Stop" (Live at Somerset House)* – 4:20
- CD2
1. "Twist" (Jacques Lu Cont's Conversion Perversion Mix) – 6:48
2. "Forever" (Mountaineers Remix) – 3:54
3. "Twist" (Dimitri Tikovoï Remix) – 6:30
- DVD single
1. "Twist" (Live in London – Short film feat. Interview)
2. "Train" (Live in London)* – 5:10
3. "Strict Machine" (Live in London)* – 4:55
- Digital single (2018)
1. "Twist" (Single Mix) – 3:31
2. "Yes Sir" – 3:57
3. "Deer Stop" (Live at Somerset House)* – 4:20
4. "Train" (Live in London)* – 5:10
5. "Strict Machine" (Live at Somerset House)* – 4:55
6. "Twist" (Jacques Lu Cont's Conversion Perversion Mix) – 6:46
7. "Twist" (Jacques Lu Cont's Conversion Perversion Dub) – 6:43
8. "Yes Sir" (Extended Mix) – 8:31
9. "Forever" (Mountaineers Remix) – 3:52
10. "Twist" (Dimitri Tikovoï Remix) – 6:30
- *Recorded at Somerset House, 13 July 2003.

== Charts ==
Chart (2003)	Peak position
Scotland (OCC)	28
UK Singles (OCC)	31
US Dance Singles Sales (Billboard)	18
