= Replica Sun Machine =

Studio album by The Shortwave Set
- Released: 5 May 2008
- Recorded: 2007
- Genre: Indie, electronica, rock
- Length: 39:14
- Label: Wall of Sound
- Producer: Danger Mouse

The Shortwave Set chronology
The Debt Collection (2005)	Replica Sun Machine (2008)

Professional ratings
Aggregate scores
Source	Rating
Metacritic	65/100 link
Review scores
Source	Rating
AllMusic	link
BBC Music	favorable) link
The Guardian	link
The Independent	link
Pitchfork	3.5/10.0 link
This Is Fake DIY	8/10 link
Twisted Ear	link

Replica Sun Machine is the second album by The Shortwave Set.

Work began on the album shortly after the release of The Debt Collection. In an interview for Swedish television, singer and songwriter Andrew Pettitt said that by February 2007 the album was completed as far as they were concerned. However, around this time, Danger Mouse heard they were working on a new album, and offered to produce it for them. This led to The Shortwave Set delaying release of the album in order to accommodate Danger Mouse's busy schedule.

Production with Danger Mouse began in May 2007. The group kept in touch with their fan base during this time in Los Angeles via a series of posts on their myspace blog. Their return in July was followed by a long 'radio silence', during which time they left their then current record label Independiente Records, and signed with Wall of Sound to produce Replica Sun Machine.

== Track listing ==
All songs written and performed by The Shortwave Set. Produced by Danger Mouse.

1. "Harmonia"
2. "Glitches 'N' Bugs"
3. "Replica"
4. "House of Lies"
5. "Now Til '69"
6. "Distant Daze"
7. "No Social"
8. "Yesterdays to Come"
9. "I Know"
10. "Sun Machine"
11. "The Downer Song"

Orchestration on tracks 3,4,8,9 arranged by Van Dyke Parks.
John Cale of The Velvet Underground is also credited for 'Viola, synths and atmospheres'.

== From Deptford to Hollywood ==
The album was released with an exclusive bonus disc via Rough Trade. The disc included alternative versions of some songs, and a movie entitled The Shortwave Set Go To Hollywood. This, along with the title of the bonus disc, From Deptford to Hollywood, reference how the band, which began in Deptford, London, ended up working with Danger Mouse (of Gnarls Barkley fame) to produce Replica Sun Machine.

1. "Yesterdays To Come (Clothed Dog Remix)"
2. "House of Lies (Orchestral Version)"
3. "Replica (Orchestral Version)"
4. "I Know (Deptford Daze Remix)"
