= List of Monkey Dust characters =

The following is a list of all major recurring characters in the BBC animated television series Monkey Dust.

== Series one ==
=== Labia ===
A series of sketches featuring a morally dubious consultancy company begin several episodes. Initially a satire on the Royal Mail renaming itself Consignia, the company charges large amounts of money on ridiculous rebranding exercises, e.g. renaming cancer as "Closure" and advertising it as an attractive end-of-life option or rebranding the fire service as 'Icarus' to combat their reputation as an "essentially reactive organisation" by going into the frothy coffee business.

The man who invents their new brand names is an international adventurer who looks like Lord Byron. The company's offices are in the shape of their logo, just like the former NatWest Tower (Tower 42).

=== Clive Pringle ===
In each episode, Clive walks slowly through the city back home, which is located in a tower block of high-rise flats. He arrives home late (sometimes months or even years) and when questioned by his wife as to his whereabouts, his excuses swiftly collapse into the plots of well-known fiction, finishing with his desperate catchphrase: "... and that, darling, is what really happened!" Examples include The Lord of the Rings, 2001: A Space Odyssey, Dune, 24, a specified episode of The A-Team, the nursery rhyme Humpty Dumpty, the song "Hotel California" by the Eagles, and even The Holy Bible...which his wife stops him on because she knows he will recite the whole Bible to her. When his long-suffering wife coolly points out his obvious plagiarism, Clive is forced to reveal his actual whereabouts. This usually involves something sexually degrading, such as bestiality or S&M. As the series progresses, his wife eventually reaches the point where she cuts him short in one episode (she is due to meet her friend Janice in five minutes), and in another she cuts him off as he is about to reveal a spoiler for the next episode of 24, which she has not seen yet. In one, as soon as Clive arrives, she barks out: "Excuse?" Clive: "I got lost on the common!" "Theme?" "Scott's Polar Expedition 1910-1912!" "Reality?" "I was getting tag-fucked in a pub toilet." At one point, Clive is abducted by aliens who cover him in lipstick marks and beer. When Clive says he has to get home, the aliens tell him to say exactly what happened. Unfortunately, because Clive is like The Boy Who Cried Wolf, he replies, "Actually, I haven't got that good of a track record." In the final skit, his wife has actually left him, and it is revealed that he is delivering his pathetic excuses to only himself in a mirror, meaning he can finally smile ironically and conclude; "I knew you would believe me!"

Liar Clive's skits are always prefaced by him walking home at night to the sound of "Lovely Head" by Goldfrapp.

=== Ivan Dobsky ===
Designed and directed by British animation director / illustrator Steve May and voiced by Simon Greenall, Ivan Dobsky is a supposed notorious criminal, known as "the Meat-Safe Murderer", held in custody in the high-security H.M. Prison Crowmarsh, and, after its destruction at Ivan's hand at the end of Series 1, New Crowmarsh PLC High Security Prison. Despite his repeated protests that he "never done it" and that his confession had been coerced by various methods of police torture and brutality, he was convicted for killing a typist at a meat-safe in 1974 by strangling her with a pair of ladies' pants. Dobsky bears more than a passing resemblance to the true case of wrongly convicted Stefan Kiszko.

Dobsky has the mental age of a four-year-old child, speaks in a soft, flowing Carlisle accent, and generally gives the impression of being a completely harmless simpleton. However, the prison warders describe him as the most dangerous man in Western Europe, and keep him in strict confinement, restrained by methods very similar to those used for Hannibal Lecter in Jonathan Demme's film version of The Silence of the Lambs.

Early episodes depict him being pardoned and released when DNA evidence exonerating him comes to light. During his time in custody he has been oblivious to changes taking place in the world outside the prison walls, and thus when he attempts to rejoin society he appears as a throwback to the 1970s. He joyfully rides out of prison on his space hopper (called "Mr Hoppy") to the music of "Come" by Eddie Warner, only to find things have changed too much for him to understand. After deciding he'd rather remain in prison than to face the modern world, he ends up actually committing a murder in order to be reincarcerated.

Mr Hoppy seems to have a mind and will of his own, carries on conversations with Dobsky, and often encourages him into violent action. The two characters are implied to represent different manifestations of a multiple personality disorder, in which Dobsky is an unwitting innocent and Mr. Hoppy a sociopathic monster. For the most part Dobsky is able successfully to remain in control, until the conclusion of the first series ends with his mind snapping and him dismembering the prison staff to construct a horrific space hopper made from bits of their bodies (on which he rides to freedom to the music of "Sunrise" by Pulp).

In the second series Ivan marries a prison visitor who then becomes the object of Mr Hoppy's jealousy and is brutally murdered by him.

Many celebrities appear to campaign to free Ivan from prison, including Brad Pitt (hired to play Ivan in a Hollywood movie), Billy Bragg, Jeremy Hardy, Manic Street Preachers, Bono and Nelson Mandela.

In the first episode of series three, Mr Drummond, the prison superintendent and Dobsky's chief caretaker, becomes enraged at factual inaccuracies pertaining to himself in the film version of Dobsky's life and joins Ivan and Mr Hoppy in a murderous rampage.

=== The Elderly Couple ===
An elderly man and woman say goodnight to each other and turn out the lights. When they fall asleep, the man has dreams of an extremely homoerotic nature, containing obvious phallic symbolism and numerous homosexual stereotypes which greatly interest him. Upon waking up, his wife asks him if he had any nice dreams, to which he replies that he did not really dream at all.

In the last episode featuring this couple, the woman has a similar dream, except involving woman bikers and a lesbian orgy to the music of "Alive" by P.O.D. When they wake up, the man asks her if she had any nice dreams, to which she replies, "No, nothing special. Just the dykes again."

=== David Baddiel ===
The famous comedian is put upon to perform numerous tasks because, as a famous comedian he is just as qualified as a trained professional. Such tasks include rescuing a child trapped underneath the wheels of a car or piloting a Space Shuttle.

He is played by himself, and in real life is married to Morwenna Banks who provides voices for several of the characters in the show.

=== Daisy Harris press conference ===
A bumbling police force investigating a young girl's murder appear alongside her foster family in a seemingly endless series of televised press conferences, but are unable to spot her foster father's obvious guilt despite the foster mother's accusing glare and stern expression. The foster father bears a marked resemblance to serial killer Harold Shipman, who went undetected for years before being identified and convicted. The inept police officer in charge constantly stresses that they are looking for somebody with "evil staring eyes" and the word "chillingly" is overused when describing the murder. A young local man of simple intellect is eventually charged with the murder, despite possibly suspect evidence (a reference to the conviction of Barry George for the murder of Jill Dando - the fictional suspect uses the alias "Frank Sinatra", while George changed his name to Barry Bulsara and claimed to be related to Freddie Mercury). The sketch is partially inspired by the Sion Jenkins investigation.

=== Divorced dad (with Timmy) ===
Timmy usually lives with his mother and Roger, his mother's new boyfriend. Each week Timmy comes to visit his father but always just talks about what Roger has done for him. The dad does not feel that he can impress him and ends up committing suicide each episode. As he goes off to kill himself, Timmy, who in reality is deeply fond of his Dad, reveals the truth too late. Roger remains an unseen character until episode 4, when Timmy shows his father a photo of him – revealing that he looks like an older version of Timmy himself, complete with ginger hair. Realising the truth, Timmy's father decides not to kill himself but to be a good father to Timmy anyway. In the last episode featuring these characters (during series two), the divorced dad is enthusiastic about a forthcoming visit from Timmy because they have not seen each other since Timmy and his mother moved to Newcastle-upon-Tyne several years previously, but on discovering that a now teenage Timmy has begun to dress, talk and act like a Geordie in order to fit in with the local kids, the father commits suicide for the final time out of sheer desperation. This turns out to be Timmy just showing off, and in fact he longs for things to be how they used to be with his father — alas, too late, as always.

=== The Cab Driver ===
An immigrant taxi driver attempts to make conversation with his passenger, each time stating that in his country, he held a certain title. "In my Country, I am the inventor of the Hoover!" After saying this, the annoyed woman in the passenger seat states that she wanted to go to a normal location, and not the outrageous location he is driven to. (Narnia, Io and the Triassic era). In one sketch, when the taxi driver says that in his country he is the most senior heart surgeon, it is instead revealed his passenger is David Baddiel (from his own sketch in the show); who indignantly replies "No, I am!"

=== Chat room pervert ===
A paedophile attempts to lure children via a chat room, but fails each time, unable to successfully portray himself as a 13-year-old boy named "Benji". Failures include correcting a child's grammar, inadvertently mentioning that he was in London while it was being bombed in World War II and trying to get a photo of the girl to whom he has been chatting, but only getting a photo of her friend "Lucy", a rabbit. When he eventually manages to arrange a meeting with one of his online friends known as "Charlotte", the "child" turns out to be another elderly chat room paedophile. The two curse ("Shit!") in unison and walk off in their respective directions.

=== The pseudo-intellectuals ===
A group of pseudo-intellectuals make increasingly pretentious statements about art, culture and life in general while waving their arms around earnestly. Examples include: "The nineties were to the eighties what the seventies were to the sixties" and "Serial killers are just rock stars without guitars". They are shown queueing outside a club or restaurant, a church, and even the house of one of their own mothers. Each time, they are turned away when they get to the front of the line due to a "No Wankers" policy. Later sketches saw other people responding to them with extreme violence before they can even get to the front of the queue: "Excuse me, I'm sorry, but I couldn't help overhearing what you were saying and I'm going to have to arrange to have you crushed to death by a grand piano."

=== Geoff the first-time cottager ===
Geoff is a wimpy bespectacled office worker who constantly tries to pluck up the courage to fellate strange men in toilets or parks ("cottaging" is the slang term), but is always thwarted somehow, and when he finally succeeds with a fellow gay co-worker, he finds that he does not really like it (although they end up cuddling instead). In one scene, Geoff attends an evening class in cottaging for beginners at his local college, in which he enters the classroom proudly announcing to the class that he wants to be a cottager, only to be told that the class is for Bengali literature and that the class he is looking for is next door. When Geoff visits Rio de Janeiro for the Carnival, he attempts to perform fellatio on a man dressed as a traffic policeman. The man tells him in Portuguese that he really is a traffic cop (Geoff looks through his phrasebook) and beats him savagely. In another episode, he is prosecuted for false advertising under the Weights and Measures Act, for describing his penis as a "Red Hot Quarter-Pounder" on a toilet wall. According to the subtitles on the DVD edition, his main theme for his sketches is "No Sant" by Wasis Diop from the album of the same name.

=== The yuppies ===
A group of middle class friends who are constantly holding very dull dinner parties, until a bizarre or out of the ordinary event happens to liven it up (e.g. in one episode a guest suddenly suggests playing Russian roulette and in the next scene one of the guests has been shot in the head; in another a couple are talking about how they had children via IVF using eggs and sperm donated by athletes and geniuses, at which point the children come downstairs and cause their parents' heads to explode using the power of telekinesis (a homage to the films Village of the Damned and Scanners). If any of the guests takes issue with the innate horribleness of what they are doing, they usually buckle to peer pressure – even to the extent of taking the bullet in the Russian roulette scene, after it becomes apparent that the rest of the group has been cheating. In each scene, David Gray (or similar MOR UK artists) can be heard playing in the background.

=== Sven-Göran Eriksson ===
A television shows a stock crowd scene from history or nature, for example, a herd of stampeding wildebeest or Indians bathing naked in the holy water of the Ganges, and a voice-over says 'And of course, no surprise to see [former manager of the England national football team] Sven-Göran Eriksson in the crowd'; a reference to his ubiquitous appearances at football matches throughout England at the time.

=== The classically-trained actor ===
A man named Guy who constantly speaks in the emotionless, non-committal style of a TV voiceover, including during sex, in the crowd at a football match, drunkenly admonishing other customers in a pub, when crying during a speech at a friend's funeral and other times when it is normal to talk in an emotional manner. His only friends are also voice over actors. One is a parody of the American gravelly voiced actor who voices over video trailers (Bill) whilst another speaks in the style of a 'consolidate your finances with one loan adverts' actor's voice. Everyone else who hears him, especially his wife, notice nothing wrong in his speech. Whenever slighted, he notes that he is a classically trained actor, but he can only ever get television voice-over work. The voice of the "classically trained actor" is voiced by a real-life voice-over artist, Peter Dickson, whose voice has been used on such shows as Today With Des and Mel, The Price is Right, The Paul O'Grady Show and many others. The other voiceover actors are played by Enn Reitel (consolidation adverts man whose voice is used by Lombard Direct) and others.

=== Theme pub ===
A cardigan-wearing man named Brian walks into his local pub, called "Jefferie's", which, although he is the only patron, has on each occasion been transformed by orders of "the brewery", seemingly in an attempt to attract more customers. Themes include a crack house and an S&M bar. On one occasion, he enters the pub to be told by a barman named Keith, in an absurd leprechaun outfit that it is now an "Oirish pub". When he asks what happened to the previous barman, who was Irish, he is told that he was not "Oirish" enough. Despite the various different themes, Brian remains the only patron, and only ever drinks a pint of Best, with cheese and onion crisps. In the last episode, the brewery decides the problem with the pub is Brian himself and ban him. As he walks past the pub, a large queue has formed, showing how successful the pub is now that people do not see Brian alone inside it.

=== Kelly, work experience girl ===
A very dim teenage girl with no understanding of office work, she says "I'm Kelly, I'm on work experience" whenever approached. She is totally inept: if asked to file some papers she might photocopy a kettle or staple a mousemat to her foot instead. In her final scene she jumps out of a window and dies, much to the joy of her employer.

=== Movie parodies ===
Several movie parodies are featured in the first and subsequent series. These typically satirise big-budget Hollywood tendencies, particularly:

1. Wildly inaccurate "historical" films, such as U-571 or The Patriot.
2. The "Americanisation" of British heroes or stories, such as Robin Hood: Prince of Thieves.
3. The casting of British actors (or use of an English accent) in the role of the antagonist – e.g. Patrick Stewart in Conspiracy Theory.

Examples include:

- The Diary of Anne Frank (series 1). Anne's merry band of Irish 'Jews' is brutally captured and terrified by the English-accented Nazi soldiers of the British Reich (pronounced "reesh"), and are held in a large castle in Berlin, England. They are rescued by Anne's GI boyfriend, Johnny, who bursts in and skewers Adolf Hitler with a US flag, a "present from President Churchill".
- The Crusades - a Jerry Brickhammer production (series 2). A bunch of American accented crusaders train to join the 42nd Horseborne. Sample line - "Say-laddin, you English bastard!". Ending line - "In honor of all the Americans who died in the early Middle Ages."
- They All Come Home (series 3). An American Special Forces unit, "The Laser Rangers", save a pilot who has crashed behind "enemy" lines – in Freeville, the capital of Bongostan – in an overly aggressive manner. Despite the fact that the locals are clearly friendly, and even offer to repair the Rangers' broken helicopter, they torture a woman to make her tell them where the airport is, even though it is right behind them and she is freely offering the information already.

== Series two ==
=== People on the Toilet ===
Proposed by the television controller at the beginning of season 2, People on the Toilet is a reality TV show frequently seen or referred to throughout season 2, in which cameras film contestants sitting on the toilet 24 hours a day. Elaine, being the most popular (and seemingly only) contestant quickly becomes a huge, almost godlike media celebrity, appearing on Question Time and being bestowed such honours as meeting Nelson Mandela and carrying the Olympic torch on the final leg of its journey, chairing peace talks at the Geneva Convention and finally becoming the president of the Republic of Macedonia. Her exploits are often heard on the news during Clive Pringle's walk home. The show achieved viewing figures of 120 million, meaning the entire population of the UK watched it twice. Abdul and Shafiq also mention a celebrity version featuring Su Pollard.

=== Jon Swoon ===
TV presenter/lawyer who tries to have Ivan Dobsky released from prison (while mentioning his own name at every possible opportunity). He ends up murdered by Dobsky's security robotic arm. Hosts a programme called Beyond Reasonable Doubt and sets about proving that Dobsky could not possibly have committed the Meatsafe murders because of the length of time it would have taken him to travel from where he was last seen to the crime scene by spacehopper (the scene featured on the DVD cover). The character appears to be a satire of channel 4 newsreader Jon Snow.

=== Omar, Abdul and Shafiq, the incompetent terrorists ===
Omar, a former privileged public schoolboy, is a fanatical Islamist and a member of a terrorist organisation he calls 'The International Revolutionary Jihad for the Liberation of the Islamic Republic of Great Britain'. His cell is based in West Bromwich in the West Midlands and is bent on "unleashing a reign of terror the like of which the world has only dreamed about in its foulest nightmares." Omar has recruited two teenage boys, Abdul and Shafiq, to carry out suicide bombings in the name of Allah - but through various comical misadventures, their plans always fail.

The effectiveness of their terror campaign is somewhat undermined by the fact that Abdul and Shafiq seem to take their jihad for granted and treat it with the same offhandedness as the mundane details of their daily lives such as sport (their beloved West Bromwich Albion Football Club) and television (shows such as Room 101 and Celebrity Stars in Their Eyes), and also because Abdul and Shafiq (and Omar to a lesser degree) are so very much a part of the Western culture and lifestyle they are attempting to defeat. Omar suffers much of this, but often reveals he too finds the fate of West Bromwich Albion F.C. to be just as serious a matter as the liberation of anyone, and just as likely to dictate when and how his terrorist attacks take place – usually in order to avoid missing a game. As the series progressed, it became more and more apparent that Omar was just as immature and insincere in his hatred for the west as his two underlings, and this was highlighted by the introduction of one of his superiors in a later episode (during which the instruction to "come under cover of darkness" was misinterpreted, resulting in the IRJLIRGB arriving dressed as the British rock group The Darkness).

It is possible the inspiration for this depiction of radical Islamicist ideology in the midst of otherwise normal modern British life comes from the detention of the so-called Tipton Three at Camp X-Ray. In Monkey Dust's sketches, Omar the ringleader is said to come from Tipton, where the jihad is taken "dead serious".

There are similarities between this sketch and the film Four Lions.

=== Abu the illegal immigrant ===
An illegal immigrant who is never able to see the bad side of living in Britain, and remains eternally optimistic however dire his situation becomes. He often writes gushing letters to his family in India about how wonderful his new life in Britain is (despite overwhelming evidence to the contrary), and even chooses a strip club as the ideal place to look for a girlfriend. He quickly gets promoted in his new job from doormat to curtain.

=== Essex man and London man ===
Two large, bald, essentially identical, men discuss the relative merits of Essex and London, usually on a topical theme (i.e. where the next James Bond should come from, or where the best women can be found). This usually escalates to them yelling "ESSEX!" and "LONDON!" at each other. This references the way that, to the rest of the country, Essex and London are considered merely as contiguous parts of a whole. In one episode, a Madrid-Barcelona equivalent featured, wearing football shirts and Spanish moustaches despite the fact, unlike London and Essex, the two cities are over 300 miles apart. The later skits culminate by revealing them to be in an intimate relationship.

=== "Your hair looks nice" ===
A woman is having her hair done. Her boyfriend tries to remember to compliment her on her new style, but is always distracted by some extraordinary event, such as an alien invasion, the arrival of James Bond or even the Second Coming of Jesus. By the time his girlfriend arrives, all evidence of the strange event has disappeared, and she thinks her speechless boyfriend just does not care.

=== The Paedofinder General ===
Inspired by the film Witchfinder General. An ominous, imposing character who executes innocent people whom he accuses of being child molesters on dubious evidence, parodying the hysterical waves of moral panic over the issue of paedophilia that swept Britain at the time (largely driven by the tabloid media), leading to certain individuals being demonised for little or no reason. Examples include a quiz show host seeking the correct answer of "P.D. James", a public swimming pool attendant whose Speedo trunks are misread as "Peedo", and the cast of a production of Fiddler On The Roof because of the dubious innuendo of the title. When executing suspected paedophiles, he will cite justification with the likes of, "By the powers invested in me by a text vote on Sky News...", "by a bloke I met down the pub, who knew for definite...", or "By prurient wishful thinking... I proclaim you guilty of paedophilia!" He has no qualms with executing anyone, even killing the children of a suspect because "Most victims of abuse grow up to abuse others. It's like werewolves." He is seen looking at and actually preparing to download online child pornography himself, but claims that it is "for research". The Paedofinder General appeared in a few skits in the first episode of series two and returned as a regular character in series three. In the third series, the Paedofinder General has a musical number, singing along with some of his cohorts. The song is "Fire" by The Crazy World of Arthur Brown (albeit with slightly changed lyrics).

=== Mail-order bride man ===
A grotesquely fat middle-aged man with a quiff, sideburns, poor personal hygiene and a penchant for Andy McNab books and REO Speedwagon, greets his Thai mail-order bride who turns out to be beautiful, intelligent, adoring of him and completely impervious to his disgusting lifestyle. Each episode, when he expects sex and she declines because she wants their love to grow stronger by waiting, he kicks her out.

In his final appearance, the man orders a mail order bride that is clearly a man. But despite the bad looks, rude attitude and general nastiness of the mail order bride, the man is happy because his bride offers him a "bunk up", even though it cost him £50.

=== Nazi grandfather ===
An apparently kind and elderly man who is a former high-ranking member of the Nazi Party and was almost certainly active in their numerous war crimes. Before going to formal events (his granddaughter's wedding, a court hearing), he is told to wear something smart for the occasion, but finds he has nothing smart left to wear except his Nazi SS dress uniform jacket, complete with swastika armband and SS-Totenkopfverbande cap badge, inevitably leading to trouble. On one occasion he is admitted into a nursing home, but has to leave when the other elderly people realise he is Die (sic) Weiße Engel - a reference to a scene in the movie Marathon Man and to Dr Josef Mengele, latterly of Auschwitz.

=== Alex, the Relationship-seeking girl ===
A girl at a club with her friends, looking for love, walks over to a man, and asks his name. As soon as he says his name, she is starstruck and starts dreaming of the future. She imagines first a series of romantic events (candlelit dinner, a tropical resort holiday, a wedding) followed by a disastrous event to end their relationship (man cheating on her, man dressing up in her clothes, man flopping in bed.) She then storms off within seconds, usually after throwing a drink over him or slapping him in the face, before heading back to her friends, where she tells them what a "wanker" he was, and they all commiserate, "Ugh, men!"

=== Gambling-addicted dad ===
A father of a young girl is hopelessly addicted to gambling and resorts to selling her possessions and birthday presents received from her family to fund his habit. Despite this, the girl shows undying admiration and compassion for her father, often replying "I don't mind if it's going to help you get better". Having pawned off her last remaining possessions, Dad has a dream where he resorts to selling one of her kidneys and part of her liver, despite ex-footballer, Tony Adams's words of wisdom. The ever-supportive daughter subsequently suggests "I could probably make do with one lung."

== Series three ==
=== Fran Chappell ===
An ordinary mother who uses her daughter's disappearance and the ongoing police investigation as the springboard to launch a showbiz career. She appears on TV, releases a single and much more. The girl, Rebecca Chappell, eventually comes back and Fran gives her £100 and tells her to go away. Rebecca launches her own highly successful career, while her mother's fifteen minutes of fame are ending disastrously (resulting in a naked Fran begging outside the TV studios: "Gissa job! I'll do anything! Lezza stuff, barnyard sex, anal, Ready Steady Cook, anything!").

=== Noodles ===
Designed by Paul Donnellon the character draws inspiration from the characters of Tex Avery, such as Bugs Bunny. Noodles is a laboratory rabbit who can survive all manner of horrific medical experiments because he is only a toon. The sketch begins with Matt Harding's haunting "Our Conversation" playing in the background, as a doctor and another researcher discuss the problems related to a disease or overexposure to a specific drug. In the final episode he turns the tables on the researchers by dropping an anvil on their heads in true cartoon fashion. Only of course for the human doctor, this is fatal and extremely bloody.

=== Broody woman ===
A woman in denial that she wants a child despite evidence to the contrary, such as dressing kittens in baby clothes and pushing them around in a pram. In a final scene she is seen to kidnap a man, tie him up and use a breast pump on his genitals to "milk him" for her use.

=== Prime minister ===
A caricature of Tony Blair who makes a speech (later in front of an American flag to satirise his overtly US-friendly outlook), making repeated ludicrous promises such as "Magic beans for every household", "terrorism to be phased out by 2006" and "robots to cure cancer, made out of gold" with the odd realistic promise like "Post to be delivered on time" or "houses that people can actually afford" included, with the implication that they too are just as unlikely to be delivered. One of the promises made, that pubs would be open after 11pm, did actually happen.

=== Saint Stephen's Hospital ===
A very badly run hospital highlighting all the main criticisms about the British National Health Service. Its many problems include a "superbug" that can be seen visibly travelling along the corridors, patients transported in a supermarket trolley, ants invading, organs stolen from recently deceased patients, a bereavement counsellor turning up before the patient has died, but promising to return in '15 minutes' and an ultrasound scan of a pregnant woman that reveals that her baby is spraying graffiti in the womb.

Many of the visual gags, both small and large, mirrored contemporary events, such as the MRSA scare, news stories concerning tissues taken from deceased patients who were not registered donors, and even babies born in the maternity ward being sent home with the wrong parents.

=== Middle-Aged Couple ===
A middle-aged husband and wife are constantly interrupted by the noise outside their homely and comfortable flat. The wife wearily states "I bet it's those 'kids from the flats'". Her husband replies after peeking through the curtains, "yes... it's the kids from the flats again!", who are then shown performing untraditional "troublemaking" acts such as disproving the theory of gravity, coaxing Vin Diesel to fight a bear, performing handbrake turns on a giraffe and enlarging the EU.
