= Pilots (song) =

Single by Goldfrapp

from the album Felt Mountain
- A-side: "Lovely Head"
- B-side: "Horse Tears" (Live at the Ancienne Belgique)
- Released: 5 November 2001 (UK); 25 September 2001 (France); 18 February 2002 (UK re-issue)
- Recorded: Wiltshire County, England
- Length: 4:29 (album version); 3:55 (single version)
- Label: Mute
- Songwriter(s): Alison Goldfrapp; Will Gregory
- Producer(s): Goldfrapp

Goldfrapp singles chronology
"Utopia (Genetically Enriched)" (2000)	"Pilots" (2001)	"Train" (2003)

Alternative cover
- CD single #2

"Pilots" is an electronic song written by British group Goldfrapp for their debut studio album Felt Mountain (2000). The song was produced by Goldfrapp and received a positive reception from music critics. It was released as a double A-side single with "Lovely Head" in the fourth quarter of 2001, and became the band's second single to chart within the top seventy-five in the United Kingdom.

== Formats and track listings ==
These are the formats and track listings of major single releases of "Pilots".

- CD single #1
1. "Pilots (On a Star)" – 3:55
2. "Lovely Head" – 3:46
3. "Horse Tears" (Live)* – 5:37
- CD single #2
1. "Pilots (On a Star)" – 3:57
2. "Lovely Head" (Staré Město) – 3:52
3. "Utopia" (Tom Middleton Cosmos Acid Dub) – 7:21
4. "Pilots (On a Star)" (Video) – 3:57
- *Recorded at Ancienne Belgique, Brussels, 2 April 2001.
