= Utopia (Goldfrapp song) =

Goldfrapp song

Single by Goldfrapp

from the album Felt Mountain
- Released: 6 November 2000
- Recorded: Wiltshire, England
- Genre: Electronica
- Length: 4:18
- Label: Mute
- Songwriter(s): Alison Goldfrapp; Will Gregory
- Producer(s): Goldfrapp; Gregory

Goldfrapp singles chronology
"Lovely Head" (2000)	"Utopia" (2000)	"Human" (2001)

"Utopia" is an electronic song performed by British group Goldfrapp. The song was written and produced by Alison Goldfrapp and Will Gregory for the duo's debut album Felt Mountain (2000). It was released as the album's second single in November 2000. Although the song did not appear on the UK Singles Chart initially, it reached number 29 on the UK Indie Chart and found minor success in the Netherlands, debuting and peaking at number 94 in January 2001.

Alison Goldfrapp stated that the song deals with genetic engineering, which she compares to fascism.

The song was appeared at the end credit of the 2024 film Afraid.

== Formats and track listings ==
- CD & 12" single
1. "Utopia" (Original Mix) – 4:16
2. "Utopia" (New Ears Mix) – 3:08
3. "Utopia" (Sunroof Mix) – 7:37
- Digital single (2018)
1. "Utopia" – 4:18
2. "Utopia" (New Ears Mix) – 3:10
3. "Utopia" (Sunroof Mix) – 7:37
4. "Utopia" (DNA Mix) – 4:20
5. "Utopia" (Plaid Remix) – 4:41

== Charts ==
Chart (2000–2001)	Peak position
Netherlands (Single Top 100)	94
UK Indie (OCC)	29

== "Utopia (Genetically Enriched)" ==
"Utopia (Genetically Enriched)"

Single by Goldfrapp

from the album Felt Mountain
- B-side: "UK Girls (Physical)"
- Released: 11 June 2001
- Recorded: Wiltshire County, England
- Length: 3:49
- Label: Mute
- Songwriter(s): Alison Goldfrapp; Will Gregory
- Producer(s): Alison Goldfrapp; Will Gregory

Goldfrapp singles chronology
"Human" (2001)	"Utopia (Genetically Enriched)" (2001)	"Pilots (On a Star)" (2001)

"Utopia (Genetically Enriched)" is a remix of a song that was written and produced by Alison Goldfrapp and Will Gregory for the duo's debut album Felt Mountain (2000). It was released as the album's fourth single on 11 June 2001.

"Utopia (Genetically Enriched)" became Goldfrapp's first song to chart in their native United Kingdom. On the week of 17 June 2001, the song debuted on the UK Singles Chart at number 62 and reached a new peak of number eight on the UK Indie Chart.

=== Formats and track listings ===
- CD single 1
1. "Utopia (Genetically Enriched)" – 3:50
2. "U.K. Girls (Physical)" – 4:50
3. "Human" (Live Version)* – 4:45
- CD single 2
1. "Utopia" (Jori Hulkkonen Remix) – 6:17
2. "Utopia" (Tom Middleton Cosmos Vocal) – 8:17
3. "Utopia" (Tim Wright Remix) – 5:09
- 12-inch single
1. "Utopia" (Tom Middleton Cosmos Vocal) – 8:17
2. "Utopia" (Jori Hulkkonen Remix) – 6:17
3. "Utopia" (Tim Wright Remix) – 5:09
- *Recorded at Ancienne Belgique, Brussels, 2 April 2001.
- Digital single (2018)
1. "Utopia (Genetically Enriched)" – 3:50
2. "U.K. Girls (Physical)" – 4:50
3. "Human" (Live at Ancienne Belgique) – 4:45
4. "Horse Tears" (Live at Ancienne Belgique) – 5:37
5. "Utopia" (Jori Hulkkonen Remix) – 6:17
6. "Utopia" (Tom Middleton Cosmos Vocal) – 8:17
7. "Utopia" (Tim Wright Remix) – 5:09
8. "Utopia" (Tom Middleton Cosmos Acid Dub) – 7:19

=== Charts ===
Chart (2001)	Peak position
Scotland (OCC)	62
UK Singles (OCC)	62
UK Indie (OCC)	8
