= Ride a White Horse =

2006 single by Goldfrapp

Single by Goldfrapp

from the album Supernature
- B-side: "Slide In" (remix); "Boys Will Be Boys"
- Released: 13 February 2006
- Genre: Disco; synth-pop
- Length: 4:41
- Label: Mute
- Songwriters: Alison Goldfrapp; Will Gregory; Nick Batt
- Producers: Alison Goldfrapp; Will Gregory

Goldfrapp singles chronology
"Number 1" (2005)	"Ride a White Horse" (2006)	"Fly Me Away" (2006)

"Ride a White Horse" is a song by English electronic music duo Goldfrapp. The song was written by Alison Goldfrapp, Will Gregory and Nick Batt for Goldfrapp's third album Supernature (2005). The song was inspired by the disco era nightclub Studio 54.

The song was released as the album's third single in February 2006 to positive reviews from music critics. It was a commercial success, reaching the top forty on the majority of the charts it entered. The song has been remixed a number of times and was featured in an episode of the American television program The L Word, in which Goldfrapp performed it in a bar.

== Background and writing ==
"Ride a White Horse" is an electronic–dance song that was inspired by the disco era. Alison Goldfrapp had grown up listening to T.Rex and Polish disco music, and many assumed that she based the song's lyrics around Bianca Jagger's infamous entrance into Studio 54 on a white horse. The song was composed as a collaborative effort between Goldfrapp and Will Gregory in late 2004 in a rented cottage in the countryside of Bath, England. The song was written and recorded while Goldfrapp and Gregory were "jamming in the recording studio, bouncing song ideas off each other".

"Ride a White Horse" is written in the common verse-chorus form and features instrumentation from synthesizers and a bass guitar. The US maxi CD single featured a cover version of "Boys Will Be Boys" as its B-side. The song was originally performed by British rock group the Ordinary Boys.

== Music video ==
Alison Goldfrapp pulling a large plastic dog in the music video.

The music video for "Ride a White Horse" was directed by Diane Martel and filmed in London, England in December 2005. The video features Alison Goldfrapp dressed in a white romper, posing within (or superimposed over) multiple bizarre, borderline-disturbing scenarios. The video begins with Goldfrapp, her back to the camera, trailing toilet paper from one of her spike heels, singing into a microphone made of a cardboard roll and aluminium foil. As she sings, she is superimposed over piles of rotting, wasted food, trash, and other refuse. She is then shown biting into a slice of “pizza” covered in “cigarette butts” and “bottlecaps”. The next scenes feature Goldfrapp pulling a large plastic dog, resembling an animal statue of Ancient Egyptian style. In the following scenario, oblivious to her presence, is a man wrapped completely in toilet paper—or possibly portraying an Egyptian mummy—and eating from a garbage can. The final scenes show Goldfrapp singing amongst her visibly dirty background dancers, all with wigs to resemble straggly, unkempt hair and mud smeared over their bodies, wearing nothing but what appear to be loincloths. The dancers, who themselves resemble cavemen or even Neanderthals, appear as they climb out of a trash dumpster in their underwear. The video concludes with Goldfrapp forcing the leg of the bandaged man into a toilet.

In 2006, the video was nominated at the Festival International des Arts du Clip in the "Off Competition" category for its audacity and off-beat sense of humour. The complete version of "Ride a White Horse" featured in the music video has been released commercially through CD singles and digital downloads, and some include remixes by Serge Santiágo and Ewan Pearson. An alternate music video was also filmed live at the Brixton Academy in London, England on 6 October 2005. The video was directed by Matthew Amos and released on the song's DVD single.

== Critical reception ==
"Ride a White Horse" received positive reviews from music critics. MusicOMH.com's Michael Hubbard called the song "one of the most glamorous and erotic tracks" on Supernature, and Stylus Magazine described it as "memorable" because of its "combination of a decently danceable groove and some nicely arch vocals". In a review for PopMatters, Adrien Begrand wrote that "Ride a White Horse" was "destined for club hit status", comparing Alison Goldfrapp's "cold, husky croon" to Kate Bush.

== Marketing and release ==
In March 2007, "Ride a White Horse" was featured on an episode of the American television program The L Word. The episode titled "Literary License to Kill" featured the group performing the song at The Planet cafe-bar while the characters celebrated a birthday. A radio edit of the song was also featured on the program's soundtrack released in January 2007.

"Ride a White Horse" was released as a various formats throughout the world. While most territories received a CD single and digital download release, the single was released as two CD singles on 13 February 2006 in the UK. A DVD single was also issued and included behind the scenes footage of Goldfrapp on tour and a live music video for "Ride a White Horse". On 27 February 2006, two 12-inch vinyl singles were issued. In Australia, a CD single was issued on 6 March 2006.

== Commercial performance ==
"Ride a White Horse" entered the UK Singles Chart on 25 February 2006 at number 15, remaining on the chart for three weeks. The song proved popular on UK radio, charting at number 23 on the airplay chart. In Ireland, the song reached number 36 on the singles chart before exiting the following week.

In the United States, "Ride a White Horse" was released as the album's final single. The song did not perform as well as its predecessors on the Billboard Dance Chart, reaching only number 29. The song, however, did peak at number three on the Hot Dance Singles Sales chart.

== Track listings ==
- CD single 1
1. "Ride a White Horse" (single version) – 3:46
2. "Slide In" (DFA remix (edit)) – 5:24
- CD single 2
1. "Ride a White Horse" (Serge Santiágo re-edit) – 8:09
2. "Ride a White Horse" (FK-EK vocal version) – 7:48
3. "Ride a White Horse" (FK Disco Whores dub) – 7:40
4. "Ride a White Horse" (Ewan Pearson Disco Odyssey Parts 1 + 2) – 15:13
- DVD single
1. "Ride a White Horse" (live in London)* – 7:12
2. "Supernature Tour Access All Areas" – 4:25
3. "Number 1" (Múm remix) (audio) – 2:37
- US CD maxi single
1. "Ride a White Horse" (single version) – 3:46
2. "Boys Will Be Boys" – 2:48
3. "Ride a White Horse" (FK-EK vocal version) – 7:48
4. "Ride a White Horse" (FK Disco Whores dub) – 7:40
5. "Ride a White Horse" (Ewan Pearson Disco Odyssey Parts 1 + 2) – 15:13
6. "Ride a White Horse" (Serge Santiágo re-edit) – 8:09
7. "Ride a White Horse" (video) – 3:21
8. "Ride a White Horse" (live in London, video) – 7:12

- European CD maxi single
1. "Ride a White Horse" (single version) – 3:46
2. "Ride a White Horse" (Serge Santiágo re-edit) – 8:09
3. "Ride a White Horse" (FK-EK vocal version) – 7:48
4. "Slide In" (DFA remix) – 12:59
5. "Number 1" (Múm remix) – 2:33
6. "Ride a White Horse" (live in London, video) – 7:12
7. "Supernature Tour Access All Areas" (video) – 4:25
- 12-inch single 1
1. "Ride a White Horse" (Serge Santiágo re-edit) – 8:05
2. "Ride a White Horse" (FK-EK vocal version) – 7:45
- Filmed at Brixton Academy, 6 October 2005
- 12-inch single 2
1. "Ride a White Horse" (Ewan Pearson Disco Odyssey Parts 1 + 2) – 15:12
2. "Ride a White Horse" (FK Disco Whores dub) – 7:37
- Digital single (2019)
1. "Ride a White Horse" (single version) – 3:44
2. "Slide In" (DFA remix) (edit) – 5:21
3. "Ride a White Horse" (Serge Santiágo re-edit) – 8:07
4. "Ride a White Horse" (FK-EK vocal version) – 7:48
5. "Ride a White Horse" (FK Disco Whores dub) – 7:41
6. "Ride a White Horse" (Ewan Pearson Disco Odyssey Pt. 1) (edit) – 6:53
7. "Ride a White Horse" (Ewan Pearson Disco Odyssey Pts. 1 + 2) – 15:13
8. "Number 1" (Múm remix) – 2:33

== Personnel ==
The following people contributed to Ride a White Horse:

- Alison Goldfrapp – lead vocals, backing vocals, synthesizer
- Nick Batt – synthesizer, programming
- Will Gregory – synthesizer
- Daniel Miller – synthesizer
- Charlie Jones – bass
- Ewan Pearson – programming
- Mark "Spike" Stent – mixing
- Ted Jensen – mastering

== Charts ==
Weekly chart performance for "Ride a White Horse"
Chart (2006–2007)	Peak position
Ireland (IRMA)	36
Scottish Singles Sales (Official Charts)	9
Spain (Promusicae)	7
UK Singles (Official Charts)	15
US Dance Club Songs (Billboard)	29
US Dance Singles Sales (Billboard)	5
US Hot Singles Sales (Billboard)	38

== Release history ==
Release dates and formats for "Ride a White Horse"
Region	Date	Format(s)	Label(s)	Ref.
United Kingdom	13 February 2006	CD; DVD	Mute	
United Kingdom	27 February 2006	12-inch vinyl	Mute	
Australia	6 March 2006	CD	Mute	
