= Lovely Head =

Single by Goldfrapp

from the album Felt Mountain
- Released: 15 May 2000
- Recorded: Wiltshire, England
- Genre: Chill-out; psychedelic pop; electronica; baroque pop
- Length: 3:41
- Label: Mute
- Songwriter(s): Alison Goldfrapp; Will Gregory
- Producer(s): Goldfrapp; Gregory

Goldfrapp singles chronology
| "Lovely Head" (2000) | "Utopia" (2000) |

"Lovely Head" is an electronic song performed by British group Goldfrapp. The song was written and produced by Alison Goldfrapp and Will Gregory for the duo's debut album Felt Mountain (2000). It was released as the album's first single in May 2000 but did not chart. In November 2001, the song was re-issued as a double A-side single with "Pilots (On a Star)" and reached number sixty-eight on the UK Singles Chart.

In 2002, "Lovely Head" appeared in the Guy Ritchie film Swept Away. It appeared in Jan Kounen's 99 francs (2007), as well as in Pawel Pawlikowski's My Summer of Love (2004). During 2001 the song was used in a TV and cinema advertising campaign for UK mobile phone company One2One, which featured Gary Oldman. The song was also used in Arte documentary series about photographer Helmut Newton, "Mein Leben" (2002). In 2000, the song was used by carmaker BMW in a commercial advertising its 5 Series (E39).

"Lovely Head" is used as the background music in most scenes of BBC animated television series Monkey Dust that contain the character Clive Pringle.

== Background and writing ==
Goldfrapp began work on "Lovely Head" in September 1999 in a rented bungalow in the Wiltshire countryside. Alison Goldfrapp contributed the song's lyrics, and William Gregory and Goldfrapp composed the music together. The duo recorded the song outside their bungalow, drawing inspiration from nature. The song was originally titled "Your Lovely Head". "Lovely Head" features lonesome and eerie whistling of the melody of the Beatles's Strawberry Fields Forever, and cold vocals set to harpsichord and strings.

What is often mistaken for a theremin synth in the song is, in fact, Alison's vocals manipulated through a Korg MS-20 synthesiser. It was inspired by Welsh singer Shirley Bassey and Italian film director Sergio Leone.

In August 2009, American music website Pitchfork listed "Lovely Head" in their Top 500 tracks of the 2000s at number 493.

== Formats and track listings ==
- CD & 12" single / digital single (2018)
1. "Lovely Head" – 3:50
2. "Lovely Head" (Staré Město Mix) – 3:51
3. "Lovely Head" (Miss World Mix) – 3:50

== Credits and personnel ==
- Alison Goldfrapp – lead vocals, backing vocals, whistling, keyboards, songwriting, production
- Will Gregory – synthesizer, keyboard, songwriting, production
- Nick Batt, Chris Weston – additional programming
- Adrian Utley – bass guitar
- John Parish – drums
- Stuart Gordon – violin, viola
- John Dent – mastering

== Charts ==
Chart performance for "Lovely Head"
| Chart (2001) | Peak position |
|---|---|
| UK Singles Chart | 68 |
