= Black Cherry (Goldfrapp album) =

2003 studio album by Goldfrapp

Studio album by Goldfrapp
- Released: 23 April 2003
- Recorded: 2002
- Studio: AIR (London); Home studio (Somerset)
- Genre: Electronica; electroclash; electropop; synth-pop; glam rock; disco
- Length: 42:57
- Label: Mute
- Producer: Alison Goldfrapp; Will Gregory

Goldfrapp chronology
Felt Mountain (2000)	Black Cherry (2003)	Supernature (2005)

Singles from Black Cherry
- 1. "Train" Released: 14 April 2003; 2. "Strict Machine" Released: 21 July 2003; 3. "Twist" Released: 3 November 2003; 4. "Black Cherry" Released: 1 March 2004

Black Cherry is the second studio album by English electronic music duo Goldfrapp, released on 23 April 2003 by Mute Records. It marked a departure from the ambient sound of their debut album, Felt Mountain (2000), incorporating glam rock and synth-pop music; inspirations were Spanish disco group Baccara and Swedish techno artist Håkan Lidbo. The album was met with positive reviews, with many critics complimenting its blend of retro and modern electropop music.

The album debuted at number 19 on the UK Albums Chart and has been certified platinum by the British Phonographic Industry (BPI). As of May 2005, it had sold nearly 500,000 copies worldwide. Black Cherry yielded four singles, including "Strict Machine", which reached number 20 on the UK Singles Chart. It earned the band a nomination for Best British Dance Act at the 2004 Brit Awards. The album was supported by the Black Cherry Tour (2003–2004).

== Recording and production ==
The duo wrote three songs while touring in support of their debut album Felt Mountain, but decided to take their work in a different direction with more rhythmic music. Goldfrapp chose to record in a studio in a Bohemian area of Bath, England, because they needed a place to place their equipment and start working. The band began working on the album in January 2002 with a list of songs they wanted to try to record, such as a disco song with only string instruments. The studio's walls were covered in neon lights and Alison Goldfrapp used them to write down her song ideas. They recorded early demos and worked on pre-production using a Yamaha 02R digital mixing console. Goldfrapp held jam sessions with Mark Linkous and Adrian Utley and, after they built momentum writing the album, decided not to move to another studio.

The album cover is a collage made by Mat Maitland of photographs taken by Polly Borland featuring Alison with two wolves. Artwork in the liner notes also has a wolf motif, including women with wolf heads. Goldfrapp explained that the wolves are a representation of might and mysticism and that she was "interested in the idea of metamorphosis and humans wanting to be like animals and animals wanting to be like humans."

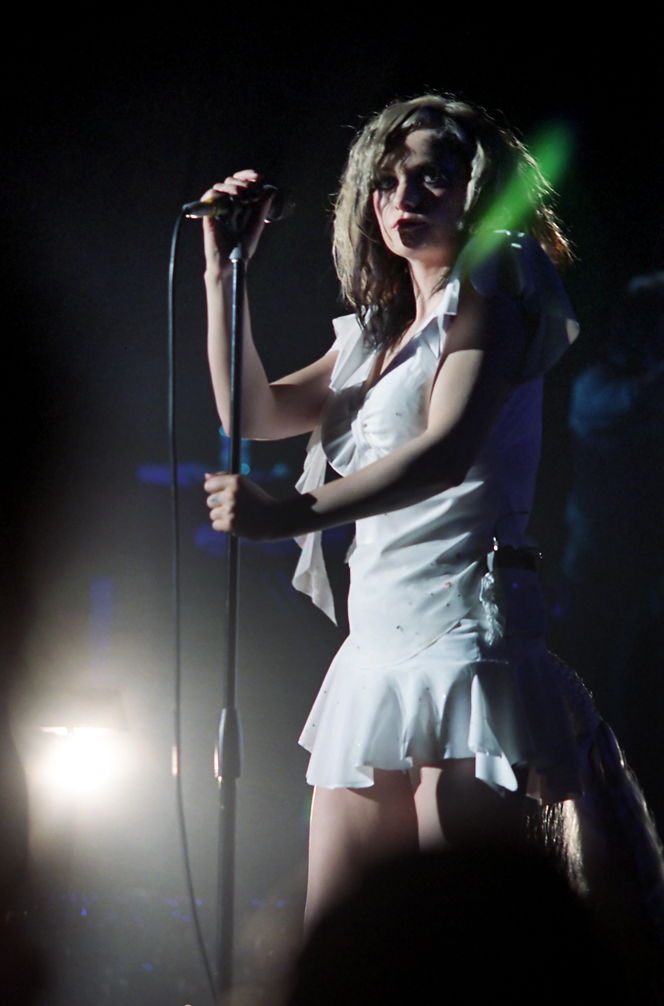
Goldfrapp performing in October 2003

== Composition ==
After touring in support of Felt Mountain, Alison stated that she felt performing slow torch songs "really claustrophobic". During their jam sessions, improvisation became a major part of the group's approach to recording Black Cherry. The album focuses more heavily on dance music and glam rock-inspired synthesisers than its predecessor, and is influenced by Spanish disco group Baccara and Swedish techno artist Håkan Lidbo. Goldfrapp commented that the album differs from Felt Mountain because the band "wanted to put more kind of 'oomph' in it." She stated that the lyrics are "a lot more direct and…less ambiguous." The songs on Black Cherry are more forthright in describing sexuality than those on Felt Mountain.

== Critical reception ==
Professional ratings
Aggregate scores
Source	Rating
Metacritic	72/100
Review scores
Source	Rating
AllMusic	4/5 stars
Blender	4/5 stars
Entertainment Weekly	C
The Guardian	4/5 stars
Mojo	4/5 stars
Pitchfork	5.8/10
Q	3/5 stars
Rolling Stone	4/5 stars
Spin	B
Uncut	5/5 stars

Black Cherry received generally positive reviews from music critics. At Metacritic, which assigns a normalised rating out of 100 to reviews from mainstream publications, the album received an average score of 72, based on 22 reviews. Uncut praised the change in the duo's musical direction, concluding, "I doubt there'll be many better albums released this year." Alexis Petridis of The Guardian called the album "laudable, challenging and immensely enjoyable". Sal Cinquemani of Slant Magazine opined, "Whether it be soothing techno-ballads [...] or custom-made clubs tracks [...], Goldfrapp know how to draw you in and, more importantly, hook you." Rolling Stone's Pat Blashill noted that "[t]ons of bands imitate the sounds of the early Eighties, but Goldfrapp use New Wave as a way to evoke a long history of shiny Euro-lounge music." Spin commented that on Black Cherry, the duo "downplay the 'cinematic' strings in favor of buzzing live-wire synths. And singer Alison Goldfrapp still wails like Kate Bush haunting a fog-soaked moor." Mojo praised the album as "lucid and ambiguous... beautifully schizophrenic and poised on the edge of ruin".

Dorian Lynskey of Blender wrote, "Although a few tracks retain Felt Mountain's eerie beauty, Black Cherry's natural habitat is less supper club than strip club, and Goldfrapp sound right at home." Andy Hermann of PopMatters viewed Black Cherry as "a weird, edgy album, the work of two doggedly maverick talents chasing their muses wherever they take them". Wes May of About.com dubbed it a "rare electronica album of warmth and depth" and "the ultimate chillout pleasure". Drowned in Sound's Gen Williams expressed that the album's "crystalline, neon-edged beauty, its pulsing army of beats and Alison's lush, lethargically versatile vocals, swinging between sultry and seraphic throughout, make it—for now at least—a largely satisfying record that indicates imminent and deserved success for Goldfrapp." Q deemed the album "thoroughly likeable" despite its "inconsistency". In a mixed review, Heather Phares of AllMusic commended Goldfrapp for their "artistic risk-taking", but felt that the album "sounds unbalanced, swinging between delicate, deceptively icy ballads and heavier, dance-inspired numbers without finding much of a happy medium between them." Michael Idov of Pitchfork criticised the duo's switch to electro music, while describing Black Cherry as "a soundtrack to excruciatingly banal seduction". Jonah Weiner of Entertainment Weekly panned the album's slower tracks as "boring dirges and space-age Muzak".

PopMatters included the album on its list of the Top 50 Albums of 2003, ranking it at number 46. It was listed at number 33 on Drowned in Sound's list of the Top 75 Albums of 2003. Black Cherry earned Goldfrapp a nomination for Best British Dance Act at the 2004 Brit Awards, but they lost to Basement Jaxx.

== Commercial performance ==
Black Cherry debuted at number 19 on the UK Albums Chart, selling 14,859 copies in its first week. The album had sold 256,703 copies in the United Kingdom as of August 2005. Later that month, on 26 August 2005, Black Cherry was certified platinum by the British Phonographic Industry (BPI), denoting shipments in excess of 300,000 copies in the UK. The album reached the top 30 in Germany, Ireland, Norway and Portugal, and the top 50 in Belgium, France and Switzerland.

Black Cherry became Goldfrapp's first album to chart in the United States, reaching number four on the Top Electronic Albums chart and number 27 on the Top Independent Albums chart. By August 2006, it had sold 52,000 copies in the US. The album had sold nearly 500,000 copies worldwide as of May 2005.

== Track listing ==
All tracks are written by Alison Goldfrapp and Will Gregory, except where noted.

No.	Title	Writer(s)	Length
1.	"Crystalline Green"		4:28
2.	"Train"		4:11
3.	"Black Cherry"		4:56
4.	"Tiptoe"		5:10
5.	"Deep Honey"		4:01
6.	"Hairy Trees"		4:37
7.	"Twist"		3:32
8.	"Strict Machine"	Goldfrapp; Gregory; Nick Batt	3:51
9.	"Forever"		4:14
10.	"Slippage"		3:57
Total length:			42:57

Japanese edition bonus tracks
No.	Title	Length
11.	"Big Black Cloud, Little White Lie"	3:07
12.	"Train" (Village Hall Mix)	5:28
13.	"Train" (Ewan Pearson 6/8 Vocal)	7:34
14.	"Train" (T. Raumschmiere Remix)	5:52
Total length:		59:58

Dutch special edition bonus CD
No.	Title	Writer(s)	Length
1.	"Strict Machine" (Benny Benassi Sfaction Edit)	Goldfrapp; Gregory; Batt	3:27
2.	"Train" (Ewan Pearson Dub)		7:46
3.	"Deep Honey" (Live at London ULU, 6 March 2003)		4:41
4.	"Hairy Trees" (Live at London ULU, 6 March 2003)		6:47
5.	"Yes Sir"	Rolf Soja; Frank Dostal	3:58
6.	"El Train" (T. Raumschmiere Rmx)		5:52
7.	"Strict Machine" (Benny Benassi Sfaction Extended Mix)	Goldfrapp; Gregory; Batt	6:53
Total length:			39:24

== Personnel ==
Credits adapted from the liner notes of Black Cherry.

=== Goldfrapp ===
- Alison Goldfrapp – vocals, arrangements, synths
- Will Gregory – arrangements, synths

=== Additional musicians ===
- Charlie Jones – bass (track 8)
- Damon Reece – drums (track 8)
- Rowan Oliver – drums, percussion (track 2); additional drum programming (tracks 3, 4, 6, 7)
- Adrian Utley – guitar, bass (track 2)
- Mark Linkous – Casio (track 2)
- Andy Davis – guitar (track 10)
- Nick Batt – additional programming, synths
- Nick Ingman – string orchestration, string conducting

=== Technical ===
- Alison Goldfrapp – recording, production (all tracks); mixing (tracks 2, 3, 5, 9, 10)
- Will Gregory – recording, production (all tracks); mixing (tracks 2, 3, 5, 9, 10)
- Nick Batt – recording
- Bruno Ellingham – Pro Tools editing
- Steve Orchard – string recording, string submixing
- Tom Elmhirst – mixing
- David Bascombe – mixing (tracks 6, 8)
- Mike Marsh – mastering

=== Artwork ===
- Alison Goldfrapp – art direction, design
- Big Active – art direction, design, illustrations, type
- Polly Borland – photography

== Charts ==
=== Weekly charts ===
Weekly chart performance for Black Cherry
Chart (2003–2004)	Peak position
Australian Albums (ARIA)	71
Australian Dance Albums (ARIA)	7
Belgian Albums (Ultratop Flanders)	46
Belgian Albums (Ultratop Wallonia)	29
Dutch Albums (Album Top 100)	91
European Albums (Music & Media)	31
French Albums (SNEP)	45
German Albums (Offizielle Top 100)	25
Irish Albums (IRMA)	30
Norwegian Albums (VG-lista)	26
Portuguese Albums (AFP)	26
Scottish Albums (OCC)	16
Swiss Albums (Schweizer Hitparade)	41
UK Albums (OCC)	19
US Independent Albums (Billboard)	27
US Top Dance Albums (Billboard)	4

=== Year-end charts ===
2003 year-end chart performance for Black Cherry
Chart (2003)	Position
UK Albums (OCC)	200

2004 year-end chart performance for Black Cherry
Chart (2004)	Position
UK Albums (OCC)	137

== Certifications and sales ==
Certifications and sales for Black Cherry
Region	Certification	Certified units/sales
United Kingdom (BPI)	Platinum	300,000^{^}
Summaries
Worldwide	—	500,000
^{^} Shipments figures based on certification alone.

== Release history ==
Release dates and formats for Black Cherry
Region	Date	Format	Label	Ref.
Japan	23 April 2003	CD	EMI	
Germany	25 April 2003	CD; digital download	EMI	
Australia	28 April 2003	CD; digital download	EMI	
Spain	28 April 2003	CD; digital download	Everlasting	
United Kingdom	28 April 2003	CD; LP; digital download	Mute	
France	29 April 2003	CD; digital download	Labels	
United States	6 May 2003	CD; LP; digital download	Mute	
Netherlands	May 2004	Special edition 2-CD	[PIAS] Benelux	
