= Train (Goldfrapp song) =

2003 single by Goldfrapp

Single by Goldfrapp

from the album Black Cherry
- B-side: "Big Black Cloud, Little White Lie"
- Released: 14 April 2003
- Genre: Synth-pop; disco; glam rock; electroclash
- Length: 4:08
- Label: Mute
- Songwriters: Alison Goldfrapp, Will Gregory
- Producers: Goldfrapp, Gregory

Goldfrapp singles chronology
"Pilots" (2001)	"Train" (2003)	"Strict Machine" (2003)

"Train" is a song written and performed by British musical group Goldfrapp for their second album Black Cherry (2003). It was released as the lead single in the second quarter of 2003 and reached the top thirty in the United Kingdom, where it became the duo's first top thirty single. The track was self-produced by the duo.

== Composition and lyrics ==
"Train" marks the band's transition into a more synthpop-oriented style with a glam rock influence, contrasting with the previous album Felt Mountain's downtempo and trip-hop leaning style. The song features distorted, buzzing synths and a shuffle groove, which would become hallmarks of the duo's electroclash era from Black Cherry to 2005's Supernature. In live performances in this era, Alison Goldfrapp played a theremin in the outro.

The lyrics of "Train" are based on Alison Goldfrapp's observations while in Los Angeles, California. She stated that the song describes wealth, drugs, and sex with "a sort of disgust of it and at the same time a sort of need to indulge in these things". The original title of the song was "Wolf Lady", which makes reference to the lyrics in the second verse of the song.

== Formats and track listings ==
These are the formats and track listings of major single releases of "Train".

- CD single 1
1. "Train" – 4:08
2. "Train" (Village Hall Mix) – 5:28
3. "Big Black Cloud, Little White Lie" – 3:07
4. "Train" (Video) – 4:09
- CD single 2
1. "El Train" (T.Raumschmiere Rmx) – 5:52
2. "Train" (Ewan Pearson 6/8 Vocal) – 7:34
3. "Train" (Ewan Pearson 4/4 Instrumental) – 5:27
- 12-inch single
1. "Train" – 4:08
2. "El Train" (T.Raumschmiere Rmx) – 5:52
3. "Train" (Ewan Pearson 4/4 Instrumental) – 5:27
- Digital single (2018)
1. "Train" – 4:11
2. "Train" (Village Hall Mix) – 5:28
3. "Big Black Cloud, Little White Lie" – 3:07
4. "El Train" (T.Raumschmiere RMX) – 5:52
5. "Train" (Ewan Pearson 6/8 Vocal) – 7:32
6. "Train" (Ewan Pearson 4/4 Instrumental) – 7:10
7. "Train" (Ewan Pearson 4/4 Vocal) – 7:10

== Charts ==
Chart (2003)	Peak position
Scottish Singles Sales (Official Charts)	21
UK Singles (Official Charts)	23
US Dance Singles Sales (Billboard)	10
US Hot Singles Sales (Billboard)	64
