= The Shortwave Set =

British band

- Origin: London, England
- Genres: Alternative rock Psychedelia
- Years active: 2003–2008
- Label: Wall of Sound
- Members: Andrew Pettitt; Ulrika Bjorsne; Dave Farrell

The Shortwave Set were a British alternative pop band whose debut album, The Debt Collection, was released in 2005 on Independiente Records. The band's music combines sample-based music with more traditional songwriting and instrumentation to create a sound the group have described as "Victorian Funk". The band's second album, Replica Sun Machine, was released on 12 May 2008 by Wall of Sound.

== Biography ==
The band consists of Andrew Pettitt (vocals, guitar), Ulrika Bjorsne (vocals, guitar) and David Farrell (samples, decks). They formed in 2003 in London, though Ulrika Bjorsne is originally from Alstermo in southern Sweden. They have toured with Goldfrapp, Rilo Kiley, Gnarls Barkley and Spiritualized. Danger Mouse, hip-hop producer and one half of Gnarls Barkley has described the band as his favourite contemporary group.

In addition to releasing their own material, The Shortwave Set have provided remixes for Goldfrapp, Moby and Scissor Sisters.

The band's debut album, The Debt Collection (2005), was highly regarded by critics and featured in many end of year polls for 2005, although this was not matched by a commensurate level of sales. Despite this the record was championed across a wide cross section of media tastemakers. Zane Lowe made it his Album of the week on his BBC Radio One show, and Lauren Laverne has supported their singles, making "Is It Any Wonder" her XFM record of the week, and highlighting "Slingshot" on the BBC television review programme The Culture Show. The Times made The Debt Collection its album of the week, and it also featured at number 3 in the Observer Music Monthly 'First Ten' for July 2005.

Having subsequently parted company with Independiente the band began planning for their second album, releasing one-off single "Casual Use" in the interim. The band became friends with Danger Mouse after he expressed his admiration for The Debt Collection and invited them to act as support for Gnarls Barkley, and it was announced in 2007 that The Shortwave Set were to record their follow up album with the producer in the chair.

The finished record, Replica Sun Machine, was signed to Wall of Sound in late 2007 and the band's publishing interests were secured by Chrysalis Music.

The band made their television debut in 2008, appearing at the behest of Radiohead producer Nigel Godrich on his show From the Basement which aired on the Sky Arts Channel in the UK. They also appeared on Channel 4 (again in the UK) as part of the JD Sessions, and featured in television coverage of Bestival the same year. Their track "Harmonia" featured in the fourth season of popular American TV drama Ghost Whisperer.

== Discography ==
=== Albums ===
- The Debt Collection (2005)
- Replica Sun Machine (2008)

=== Singles ===
- "Slingshot" (7" only, 2003, later released as a 10" in 2005)
- "Is It Any Wonder" (10" only, 2005)
- "Repeat to Fade" (7" only 2006)
- "Casual Use" / "Billy" (7" only, 2006)
- "No Social" (2008)
- "Now Til '69" (2008)
- "Glitches N Bugs" (2008)
