= Flak Magazine =

American online magazine founded in 1998

Flak Magazine was an early American online magazine, founded in 1998 by James Norton, Benjamin Fowler, Justin Knoll, Nicholas Coleman and others, mostly alumni and students at the University of Wisconsin-Madison. The chief editor was James Norton, the managing editors were Ben Fowler, Eric Wittmershaus and Joey Rubin. As of 2005, it reported over 250,000 unique visitors monthly. In 2008, Flak suspended publication.

== History ==
The PC Magazine wrote that Flak Magazine was "founded on the back of a placemat, prides itself on covering a little bit of everything. Topics vary wildly from music and book reviews to a feature story on the Unclaimed Baggage Center."

The content of Flak was classified into features, opinion, books, film, music, web, TV and miscellaneous. It was an independent publication whose owners claimed that making money was not among their goals.

Among the list of writers wrote for Flak were Will Leitch, author and journalist Rob Walker, Kickstarter cofounder Yancey Strickler Yahoo Sports blogger and author Andy Behrens, Forbes.com columnist Bob Cook and actor Kevin Murphy.

Over the years, it published interviews with artists including Daniel Clowes, Bruce Campbell, David Eggers, James Schamus, Seth MacFarlane and They Might Be Giants. Its Sunday Comics section included contributors such as Stephen Notley, Nicholas Gurewitch and David Malki!.

In 2006, Flak began producing a weekly podcast featuring James Norton, Taylor Carik and The Al Franken Show producer Joel Meyer. In 2007, the podcast was nominated for a regional Emmy for "Online Personality."
