= Felt Mountain =

Studio album by Goldfrapp
- Released: 11 September 2000
- Recorded: 1999–2000
- Studio: Home studio (Wiltshire, England); Christchurch (Bristol, England) (Note: Vocals on "Human")
- Genre: Electronica; ambient; trip hop; electro-cabaret
- Length: 39:32
- Label: Mute
- Producer: Will Gregory; Alison Goldfrapp

Goldfrapp chronology
Felt Mountain (2000)	Black Cherry (2003)

Singles from Felt Mountain
- 1. "Lovely Head" Released: 15 May 2000; 2. "Utopia" Released: 16 October 2000; 3. "Human" Released: 26 February 2001; 4. "Utopia (Genetically Enriched)" Released: 11 June 2001; 5. "Pilots" Released: 5 November 2001

Felt Mountain is the debut studio album by English electronic music duo Goldfrapp. It was released on 11 September 2000 by Mute Records. The album takes influence from a variety of music styles such as 1960s pop, cabaret, folk and electronica.

Felt Mountain was generally well received by music critics, and was described as "simultaneously smarmy and seductive, yet elegant and graceful". It peaked at number 57 on the UK Albums Chart, and was certified gold by the British Phonographic Industry (BPI) in October 2001. In 2001, the album was shortlisted for the Mercury Prize, an annual music prize awarded for the best British or Irish album from the previous year.

== Recording and production ==
Goldfrapp signed a recording contract with London-based record label Mute Records in August 1999. The pair began recording their debut album over a six-month period, beginning in September 1999, in a rented bungalow in the Wiltshire countryside. The recording process was difficult for Alison Goldfrapp, who was often alone and disturbed by the mice and insects in the bungalow. Gregory described their recording sessions as intense because he was unaccustomed to composing with others. Goldfrapp contributed the album's lyrics, and Gregory and Goldfrapp composed the music together. The lyrics are abstract obsessional tales inspired by science fiction, films, Goldfrapp's childhood, and the loneliness she felt while recording the album. Musically, the album takes influence from a variety of styles including 1960s pop, cabaret, folk, and electronica.

== Songs ==
"Lovely Head", Felt Mountain's opening track, features high lonesome whistling and heavily processed vocals. The song was described as influenced by Shirley Bassey and released as the album's lead single. The second track, "Paper Bag", is about being obsessed with someone and not being able to have them. It uses the word "fuck" in its opening line, making it the duo's only song on an album to include profanity. It is followed by the third single "Human", a track with a mambo-style beat. The fourth song, "Pilots", which describes travellers floating in the atmosphere above the earth, was inspired by John Barry's James Bond theme songs. A remixed version of the song was released as a single in the United Kingdom, reaching number 68 on the UK Singles Chart.

The ballad "Deer Stop" features childlike vocals and sexually suggestive lyrics. The title track was influenced by Goldfrapp's "idea of a wolf being whipped in this little Tudor house overlooking a snowy landscape". "Oompa Radar", the seventh track, was inspired by Roman Polanski's 1966 film Cul-de-Sac. The cabaret-influenced song uses a flugelhorn and a cuckoo clock to switch between tempos. "Utopia" was released as the album's second single. The album closes with "Horse Tears", a minimalist piano ballad with filtered vocals.

== Critical reception ==
Professional ratings
Review scores
Source	Rating
AllMusic	4.5/5 stars
The Encyclopedia of Popular Music	4/5 stars
The Guardian	3/5 stars
Melody Maker	3/5 stars
Muzik	5/5
NME	6/10
Pitchfork	8.0/10
Q	4/5 stars
Rolling Stone	4/5 stars
Uncut	3/5 stars

The album received critical acclaim. AllMusic reviewer Heather Phares referred to the album as a "strange and beautiful mix of the romantic, eerie, and world-weary" and named it "one of 2000's most impressive debuts". Eric Wittmershaus of Flak Magazine called Felt Mountain "an enchanting, accessible debut", citing "Human" and "Deer Stop" as its best songs. In a review for Pitchfork, Matt LeMay described the album as "elegant and graceful", but felt that the "songs aren't all that different from one another." Sacha Esterson of musicOMH compared Felt Mountain to Portishead and wrote that it could be a "contender for the year's best album". Yahoo! Music's Ken Micallef commented that the duo "make elegiac music as elegant as 'Diamonds Are Forever' and as haunting as Bobbie Gentry's 'Ode to Billie Joe'", concluding that the album's "dark night of the soul is mostly bleak, beautiful, and deliciously bizarre." Andrew Lynch of entertainment.ie noted that "[a]lthough at times it feel [sic] a little contrived, for the most part this is stylishly decadent music that should appeal to all fans of film noir." NME viewed the album as "cold, desolate and old-fashioned" and argued that Felt Mountain was not a "bad concept" except that "Portishead got there first, and managed to update the spy-film vibe with a hefty dose of break-driven twilight melancholia."

Q included the album on its list of the top 50 albums of 2000. The following year, Felt Mountain was shortlisted for the Mercury Prize, an annual music prize awarded for the best British or Irish album from the previous year. In 2006, the album was included in Robert Dimery's book 1001 Albums You Must Hear Before You Die. In November 2009, The Times ranked Felt Mountain at number 16 on its list of the 100 best pop albums of the 2000s. The album was placed at number 94 on Slant Magazine's list of the best albums of the 2000s.

== Commercial performance ==
Felt Mountain debuted at number 144 on the UK Albums Chart, selling 914 copies in its first week. In September 2001, the album peaked at number 57, and had sold 177,096 copies by August 2005. Felt Mountain was certified gold by the British Phonographic Industry (BPI) on 12 October 2001. In France, the album reached number 48, and remained on the albums chart for 11 weeks. It reached the top 40 in Germany and the top 50 in Australia and Austria. Despite not appearing on any major charts in North America, Felt Mountain had sold 52,000 copies in the United States as of August 2006. As of April 2003, the album had sold 500,000 copies worldwide.

== Track listing ==
All lyrics are written by Alison Goldfrapp; all music is composed by Will Gregory and Goldfrapp, except where noted.

Standard edition
No.	Title	Music	Length
1.	"Lovely Head"		3:49
2.	"Paper Bag"		4:05
3.	"Human"	Tim Norfolk; Bob Locke; Goldfrapp; Gregory	4:36
4.	"Pilots"		4:29
5.	"Deer Stop"		4:06
6.	"Felt Mountain"		4:17
7.	"Oompa Radar"		4:42
8.	"Utopia"		4:18
9.	"Horse Tears"		5:10
Total length:			39:32

Special edition bonus disc
No.	Title	Writer(s)	Length
1.	"Pilots" (On a Star)		3:57
2.	"UK Girls (Physical)"	Steve Kipner; Terry Shaddick; Gregory; Goldfrapp	4:52
3.	"Lovely Head" (Miss World mix)		3:51
4.	"Utopia" (New Ears mix)		3:10
5.	"Human" (Calexico vocal)		4:50
6.	"Human" (Massey's Cro-Magnon Mix)		5:56
7.	"Utopia" (Tom Middleton's Cosmos Vocal Mix)		8:19
8.	"A Trip to Felt Mountain" (visual content)		7:19

On online streaming services, "Oompa Radar" is written as "Oompah Radar".

== Personnel ==
Credits adapted from the liner notes of Felt Mountain.

=== Goldfrapp ===
- Alison Goldfrapp – vocals, whistling, keyboards
- Will Gregory – keyboards, string arrangements, brass arrangements

=== Additional musicians ===
- Stuart Gordon – violin, viola (tracks 1, 9); tremolo violins (track 6); violin solo (track 9)
- Adrian Utley – bass guitar (tracks 1, 4); synth, tremolo bass guitar (track 2)
- Nick Batt – bass synth (track 1); metal percussion (track 3); additional programming (tracks 1, 3, 4, 8)
- John Parish – drums (tracks 1, 2, 9); bass guitar, tremolo guitar (track 9)
- Alexander Bălănescu – violin (tracks 2, 5, 8)
- Sonia Slany – violin (tracks 2–5, 8)
- Nick Barr – viola (tracks 2, 5, 8)
- Nick Cooper – cello (tracks 2–5, 8)
- Mary Scully – double bass (tracks 2, 5, 8)
- Andy Davis – baritone ukulele, melodica, koto (track 2)
- Mute Male Voices – humming (track 2)
- Jacqueline Norrie – violin (tracks 3, 4)
- Bill Hawkes – viola (tracks 3, 4)
- Rowan Oliver – percussion (tracks 3, 4)
- Andy Bush – trumpet (track 3); flugelhorn solo (track 7)
- Ben Waghorn – tenor saxophone (track 3)
- John Cornick – trombone (track 3)
- Clive Deamer – brushes (track 4)
- Steve MacAllister – French horn (track 6)
- Steven Claydon – synth (track 6, 8)
- Flowers Band – brass band (track 7)
- Tony Orrell – drums (tracks 7, 8)
- Luke Gordon – additional programming (tracks 3, 4)
- Chris Weston – additional programming (track 8)

=== Technical ===
- Will Gregory – production
- Alison Goldfrapp – production
- Dave Bascombe – additional mixing (track 8)
- Nick Batt – additional mixing (track 3); additional engineering (all tracks)
- Kevin Paul – additional mixing (tracks 2, 5); additional engineering (all tracks)
- Luke Gordon – additional engineering
- David Lord – additional engineering
- John Dent – mastering

=== Artwork ===
- Alison Goldfrapp – sleeve design
- Joe Dilworth – inside photo of Will Gregory, cover photo
- Anna Fox – inside photo of Alison Goldfrapp
- C. L. Schmidt – landscape photography
- Günter Gräfenhain – landscape photography

== Charts ==
Chart (2000–01)	Peak position
Australian Albums (ARIA)	44
Austrian Albums (Ö3 Austria)	44
French Albums (SNEP)	48
German Albums (Offizielle Top 100)	36
Scottish Albums (OCC)	50
Swiss Albums (Schweizer Hitparade)	98
UK Albums (OCC)	57
UK Independent Albums (OCC)	10

== Certifications ==
Region	Certification	Certified units/sales
United Kingdom (BPI)	Gold	177,096

== Release history ==
Region	Date	Format	Edition	Label
United Kingdom	11 September 2000	CD; LP; digital download	Standard	Mute
United States	19 September 2000	CD; digital download	Standard	Mute
United Kingdom	15 October 2001	2-CD	Special	Mute
