= Strict Machine =

2003 single by Goldfrapp

Single by Goldfrapp

from the album Black Cherry
- B-side: "White Soft Rope"
- Released: 21 July 2003
- Genre: Glam rock; disco; electroclash
- Length: 3:51 (album version); 3:45 (single mix)
- Label: Mute
- Songwriters: Alison Goldfrapp, Will Gregory, Nick Batt
- Producer: Goldfrapp

Goldfrapp singles chronology
"Train" (2003)	"Strict Machine" (2003)	"Twist" (2003)

"Strict Machine" is an electronic dance song written by British electronic music duo Goldfrapp and Nick Batt for Goldfrapp's second studio album, Black Cherry (2003). It was produced by Goldfrapp and describes laboratory rats in neuroscience experiments. Alison Goldfrapp read in a newspaper about experiments in which scientists stimulated rats' brains so that the rats would feel joy when following commands. She was inspired to write "Strict Machine" based on images of the experiment and "more human aspects of machines and sex and control". Actress Gwendoline Christie features on the record sleeve disguised in a rabbit mask.

Wonderful Electric, Goldfrapp's concert tour DVD in support of Black Cherry, was named after lyrics in the song.

== Release and reception ==
The song was released as the album's second single on 21 July 2003. It received a positive reception from music critics and became the band's second single to appear in the top 30 on UK Singles Chart. On 10 May 2004, the song was re-issued and became Goldfrapp's first top-20 single in the UK. In the United States, "Strict Machine" was released to success on the Billboard dance charts, where it reached the top position on the Dance Club chart and number three on the Hot Dance Singles Sales chart. The song won the dance award at the 49th Ivor Novello Awards.

=== Critical reception ===
"Strict Machine" received positive reviews from music critics. In a review for the NME, Peter Robinson called it "a solid gold, honest-to-goodness hit record which should be Number One immediately." Andy Hermann wrote for PopMatters that the song was "a future S&M club anthem if ever there was one". Dorian Lynskey of Blender magazine also linked "Strict Machine"'s lyrics to sadomasochism, and he compared it to Donna Summer's 1977 disco single "I Feel Love". In his review for The Guardian, Alexis Petridis likened the song's "tubthumping drums" to Gary Glitter, 1980s arena rock, and hardstep, adding that "the end result is not only fantastic, but quiveringly sexy to boot".

In August 2009, American music web site Pitchfork Media listed "Strict Machine" in their Top 500 Tracks of the 2000s at number 379.

=== Chart performance ===
The song became Goldfrapp's second top-30 single when it debuted at number twenty-five on the singles chart, and spent a total of six weeks in the top 75. Following the song's re-release in May 2004, it surpassed its previous chart position in the UK by re-charting at number 20, becoming Goldfrapp's first top-20 single.

The song was also successful outside the UK. It reached number twenty-six in Canada and became Goldfrapp's first single release to chart in the country. Although the single sold considerably, "Strict Machine" did not chart on the Canadian BDS Airplay chart, receiving most of its sales from its fans in the dance clubs. In Australia, the song peaked at number fifty-four and would remain as Goldfrapp's only single to chart in the country until the release of "Ooh La La" in 2005.

After the favourable reception of "Twist" and "Black Cherry" on the dance charts, "Strict Machine" was released in the United States. It became their first release to reach the top of the Billboard Hot Dance Club Play chart, where it remained for one week. It also performed well on the Hot Dance Singles Sales chart, where it reached number three. The single sold over 170,000 copies worldwide.

=== Influence ===
When Rachel Stevens released "Some Girls" in 2004, critics noted the similarity to the sound of Black Cherry, and in particular "Strict Machine", to which "Some Girls" was described as "startlingly similar" by the Manchester Evening News. Goldfrapp had given Richard X an unmixed copy of their song to remix only to reject his efforts; shortly thereafter he wrote the Stevens song.

== Music video ==
Alison Goldfrapp in a kaleidoscopic setting containing Archigram-style buildings.

The song's music video, a mixture of graphic and live action segments, builds upon the art direction featured on the band's album and single covers. Throughout the video, Alison Goldfrapp is surrounded by black and white animated backgrounds, Siberian Husky-headed dancers, and colourful butterflies. The video uses kaleidoscopic layouts and dense graphic designs.

The music video was directed by Jonas Odell. The settings' architecture is inspired by the work of Archigram. Goldfrapp and her back-up dancers were filmed in London against a bluescreen. The animated sequences were done by Odell's Filmtecknarna studio in Stockholm, Sweden.

== Formats and track listings ==
These are the formats and track listings of major single releases of "Strict Machine".

- CD single 1 (2003)
1. "Strict Machine" (Single Mix) – 3:45
2. "White Soft Rope" – 4:30
3. "Hairy Trees" (Live in London)* – 6:48
- CD single 2 (2003)
1. "Strict Machine" (Ewan Pearson Instrumental Remix) – 5:53
2. "Strict Machine" (Rowan's Remix) – 6:03
3. "Train" (Ewan Pearson Dub) – 7:46
- DVD single (2003)
1. "Strict Machine" (Ewan's Stripped Machine Remix) – 8:33
2. "Deep Honey" (Live in London)* – 4:45
3. "Lovely Head" (Live in London) (Video)** – 4:01
- CD single 1 (2004)
1. "Strict Machine" (Single Mix) – 3:42
2. "Strict Machine" (Benny Benassi Sfaction Edit) – 3:29
- CD single 2 (2004)
1. "Strict Machine" (Paris Loaded) – 3:39
2. "Strict Machine" (We Are Glitter) – 6:28
3. "Strict Machine" (Benny Benassi Sfaction Extended Mix) – 6:50
4. "Strict Machine" (Benny Benassi Dub) – 6:26
- DVD single (2004)
1. "Strict Machine" (Calderone + Suryanto Mix Edit) (Audio) — 8:09
2. "Sartorius" (Live)*** – 4:52
3. "Deer Stop" (Live)** – 4:18
- Digital single 1 (2018)
1. "Strict Machine" (Single Mix) – 3:42
2. "White Soft Rope" – 4:30
3. "Hairy Trees" (Live in London)* – 6:48
4. "Strict Machine" (Ewan Pearson Instrumental Remix) – 5:52
5. "Strict Machine" (Rowan's Mix) – 6:07
6. "Train" (Ewan Pearson Dub) – 7:42
7. "Strict Machine" (Ewan's Stripped Machine Mix) – 8:27
8. "Deep Honey" (Live in London)* – 4:41
9. "Strict Machine" (Peter Rauhofer UK Mix) – 5:42
10. "Strict Machine" (Peter Rauhofer NYC Mix) – 8:31
11. "Strict Machine" (Ewan Pearson Extended Vocal) – 8:46
- Digital single 2 (2018)
1. "Strict Machine" (Single Mix) – 3:42
2. "Strict Machine" (Benny Benassi Sfaction Edit) – 3:29
3. "Strict Machine" (Paris Loaded) – 3:38
4. "Strict Machine" (We Are Glitter) – 6:29
5. "Strict Machine" (Benny Benassi Sfaction Extended Mix) – 6:50
6. "Strict Machine" (Benny Benassi Dub) – 6:25
7. "Strict Machine" (Calderone and Suryanto Mix) – 12:02
- *Recorded at ULU, 6 March 2003.
- **Filmed at Shepherd's Bush Empire, 4 December 2001.
- ***Filmed at La Route du Rock, 11 August 2001.

== Charts ==
=== Weekly charts ===
Chart (2003)	Peak position
Australia (ARIA)	54
Scotland Singles (OCC)	27
UK Singles (OCC)	25

Chart (2004)	Peak position
Scotland Singles (OCC)	16
UK Singles (OCC)	20
US Dance Club Songs (Billboard)	1
US Dance Singles Sales (Billboard)	3
US Hot Singles Sales (Billboard)	36

=== Year-end charts ===
Chart (2004)	Position
US Dance Club Play (Billboard)	14

== Covers ==
U.K. garage trio Band of Skulls performed a folk version of the song for Australia's Triple J radio station.

Suzi Quatro covered the track for her 2011 album, In the Spotlight. The lyrics of Quatro's version of the song contain two extra lines from her number one hit "Can the Can", in order to show the similarity of the two tunes. Jon O'Brien of AllMusic wrote that Quatro's "Strict Machine" is "a guitar-chugging mash-up of Goldfrapp's electro-pop reinvention in 'Strict Machine'; [with] her own 1973 U.K. chart-topper 'Can the Can,' cleverly referencing the subtle similarities between the two". On 16 November 2011 the music video for Quatro's "Strict Machine" was released via the SUZI QUATRO OFFICIAL YouTube channel. It was produced by Victory Tischler-Blue, formerly Vicky Blue of The Runaways, and includes the extra two lines from "Can the Can".

== See also ==
- List of number-one dance singles of 2004 (U.S.)
