= List of songs recorded by Goldfrapp =

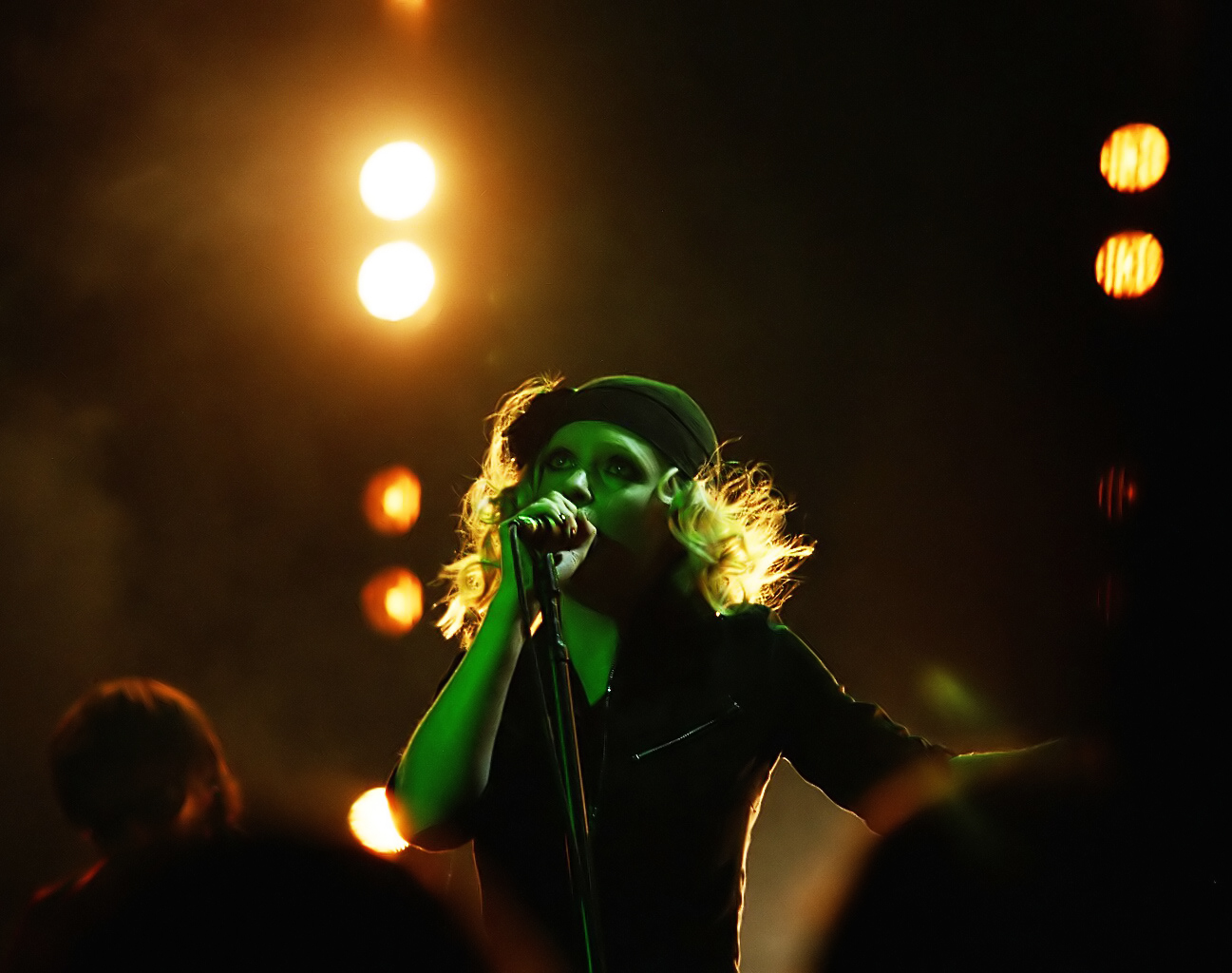
Goldfrapp have recorded songs for seven studio albums and one compilation album.

English electronic music duo Goldfrapp have recorded songs for seven studio albums, one compilation album and guest features. After signing a contract with record label Mute Records in August 1999, Goldfrapp began to work on their debut studio album, Felt Mountain, which was released in 2000. Alison Goldfrapp and Will Gregory wrote almost all of its songs, and would continue to do so for their later albums. The album's only collaboration was with Tim Norfolk and Bob Locke of the band Startled Insects on the album's third single "Human". The following year, Goldfrapp collaborated with Adrian Utley on the song "End Titles" for the Accelerator soundtrack.

Goldfrapp released their second studio album Black Cherry in 2003. The album's third single "Strict Machine" was co-written with Nick Batt and received an Ivor Novello Award. Supernature, their third studio album, was released in 2005. The album's lead single, "Ooh La La", received a Grammy Award nomination for Best Dance Recording. Batt also co-wrote the album's third single "Ride a White Horse". The duo also wrote and performed six songs for the My Summer of Love soundtrack.

In 2008, Goldfrapp released their fourth studio album Seventh Tree. The album received positive reviews and produced four singles: "A&E", "Happiness", "Caravan Girl" and "Clowns". Their fifth studio album, Head First, followed in 2010. Its lead single "Rocket" earned the band another Grammy Award nomination for Best Dance Recording. Other singles included "Alive" and "Believer". In 2012, Goldfrapp recorded two songs, "Melancholy Sky" and "Yellow Halo", for their compilation album The Singles.

== Songs ==
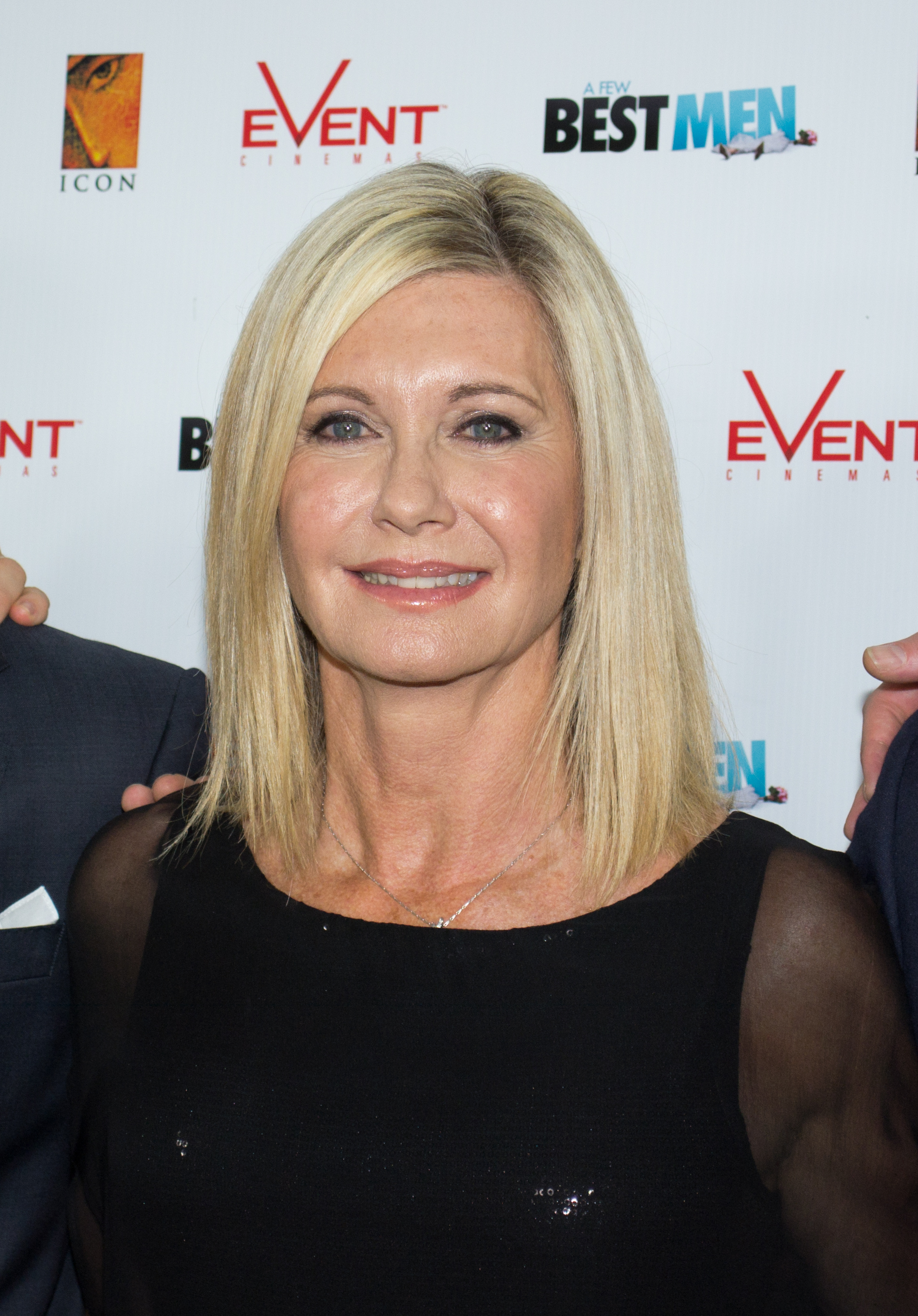
Goldfrapp recorded a cover of Olivia Newton-John's (pictured) song "Physical" for their debut studio album Felt Mountain (2000).

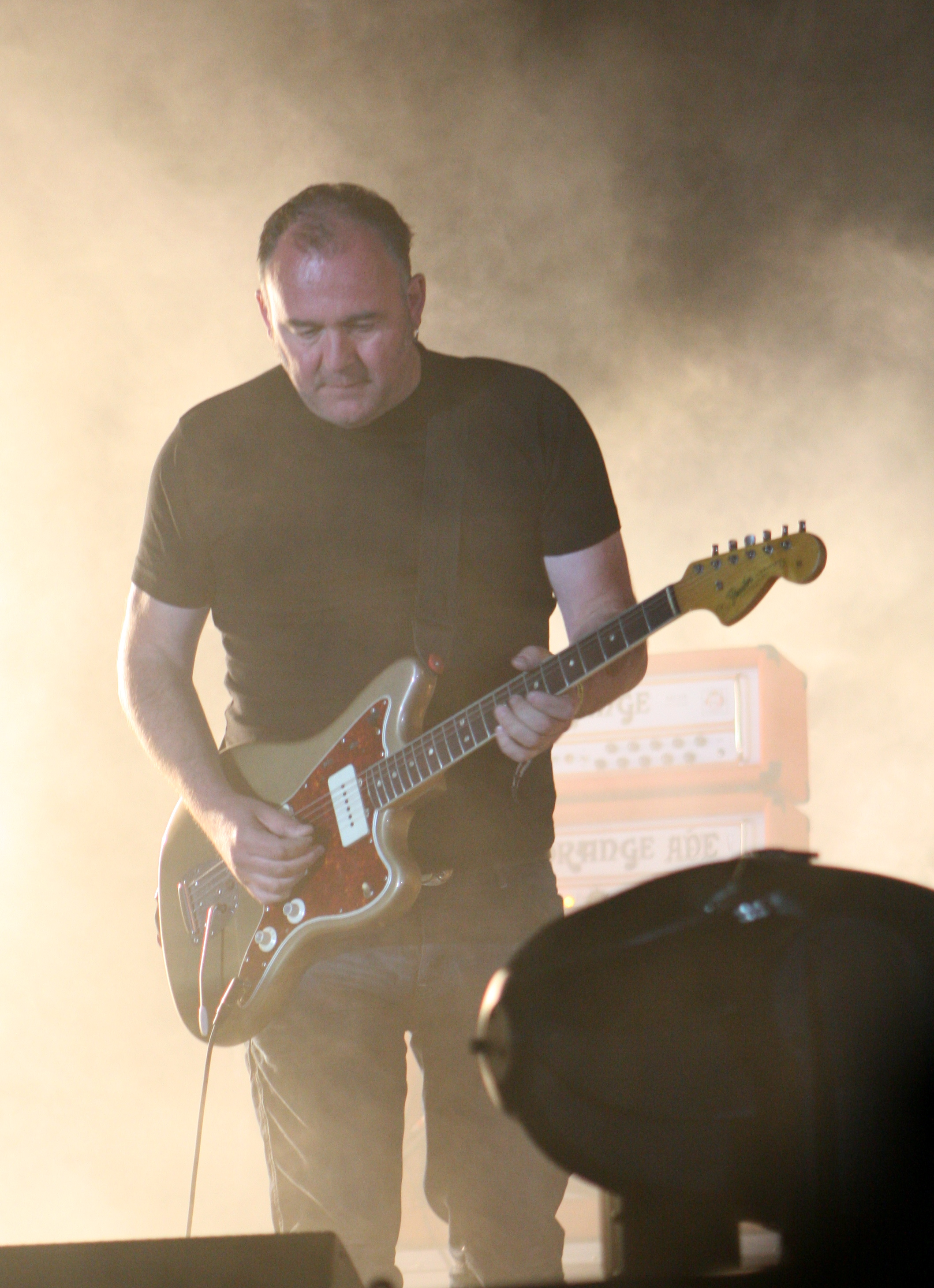
Adrian Utley (pictured) co-wrote and performed the song "End Titles" with Goldfrapp.

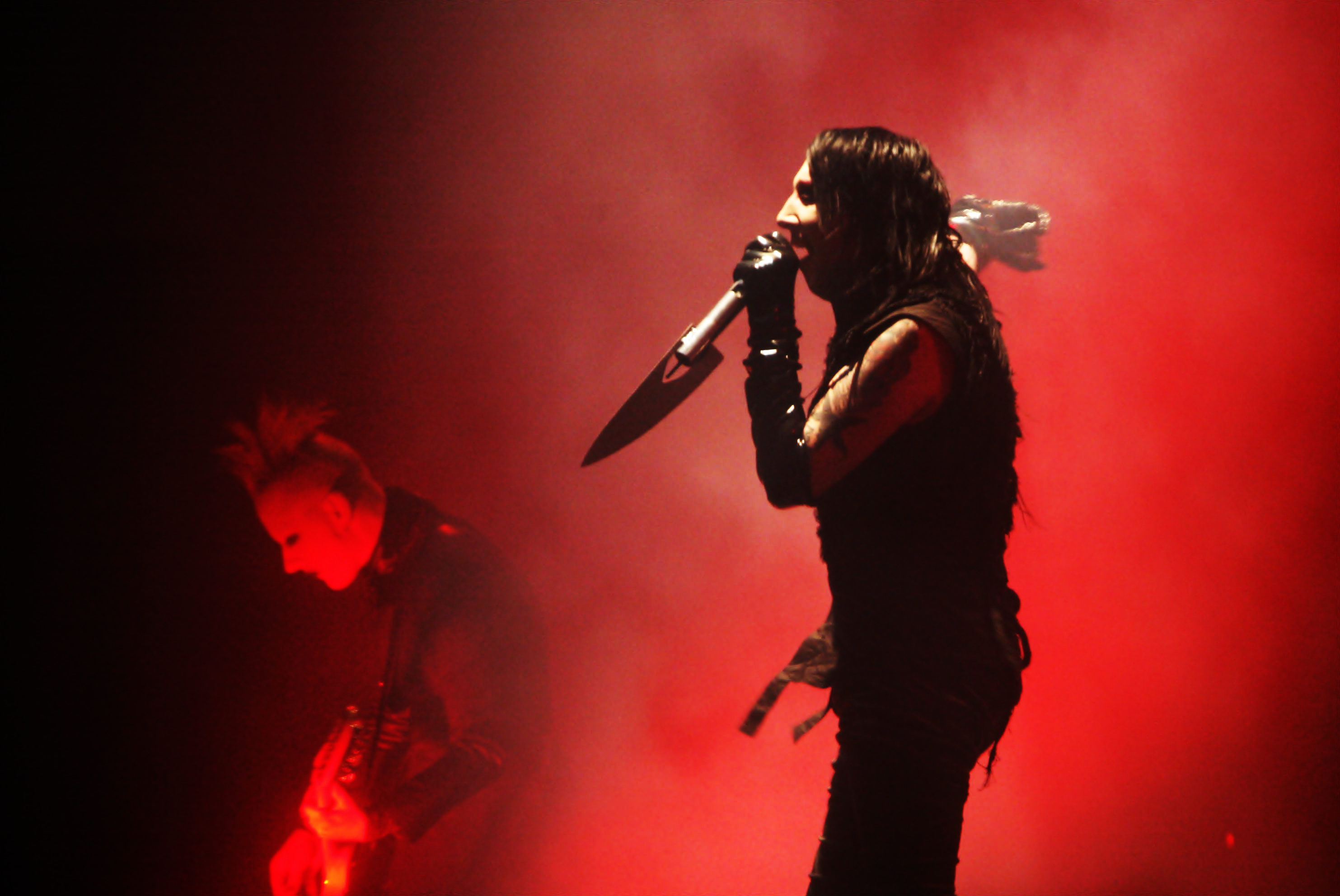
Goldfrapp collaborated with American rock band Marilyn Manson (pictured) on a remix of the song "This Is the New Shit" (2005).

Key
| † | Indicates single release |

| Song | Artists | Writers | Album | Year | Ref. |
|---|---|---|---|---|---|
| "A&E" † | Goldfrapp | Alison Goldfrapp; Will Gregory | Seventh Tree | 2008 | |
| "Alive" † | Goldfrapp | Alison Goldfrapp; Will Gregory | Head First | 2010 | |
| "All Night Operator, Part 1" | Goldfrapp | Alison Goldfrapp; Will Gregory | B-side to "Ooh La La" | 2005 | |
| "Alvar" | Goldfrapp | Alison Goldfrapp; Will Gregory | Tales of Us | 2013 | |
| "Annabel" | Goldfrapp | Alison Goldfrapp; Will Gregory | Tales of Us | 2013 | |
| "Anymore" † | Goldfrapp | Alison Goldfrapp; Will Gregory | Silver Eye | 2017 | |
| "Beast That Never Was" | Goldfrapp | Alison Goldfrapp; Will Gregory | Silver Eye | 2017 | |
| "Beautiful" | Goldfrapp | Alison Goldfrapp; Will Gregory | Supernature | 2005 | |
| "Big Black Cloud, Little White Lie (Tiptoe Revisited)" | Goldfrapp | Alison Goldfrapp; Will Gregory | Black Cherry | 2003 | |
| "Black Cherry" † | Goldfrapp | Alison Goldfrapp; Will Gregory | Black Cherry | 2003 | |
| "Become the One" | Goldfrapp | Alison Goldfrapp; Will Gregory | Silver Eye | 2017 | |
| "Believer" † | Goldfrapp | Alison Goldfrapp; Will Gregory | Head First | 2010 | |
| "Boys Will Be Boys" | Goldfrapp | James Gregory | B-side to "Satin Boys, Flaming Chic" | 2006 | |
| "Caravan Girl" † | Goldfrapp | Alison Goldfrapp; Will Gregory | Seventh Tree | 2008 | |
| "Clay" | Goldfrapp | Alison Goldfrapp; Will Gregory | Tales of Us | 2013 | |
| "Clowns" † | Goldfrapp | Alison Goldfrapp; Will Gregory | Seventh Tree | 2008 | |
| "Cologne Cerrone Houdini" | Goldfrapp | Alison Goldfrapp; Will Gregory | Seventh Tree | 2008 | |
| "Crystalline Green" | Goldfrapp | Alison Goldfrapp; Will Gregory | Black Cherry | 2003 | |
| "Deep Honey" | Goldfrapp | Alison Goldfrapp; Will Gregory | Black Cherry | 2003 | |
| "Deer Stop" | Goldfrapp | Alison Goldfrapp; Will Gregory | Felt Mountain | 2000 | |
| "Dreaming" | Goldfrapp | Alison Goldfrapp; Will Gregory | Head First | 2010 | |
| "Drew" | Goldfrapp | Alison Goldfrapp; Will Gregory | Tales of Us | 2013 | |
| "Eat Yourself" | Goldfrapp | Alison Goldfrapp; Will Gregory | Seventh Tree | 2008 | |
| "End Titles" | Goldfrapp and Adrian Utley | Alison Goldfrapp; Will Gregory; Adrian Utley | Accelerator: The Soundtrack | 2001 | |
| "Everything Is Never Enough" † | Goldfrapp | Alison Goldfrapp; Will Gregory | Silver Eye | 2017 | |
| "Faux Suede Drifter" | Goldfrapp | Alison Goldfrapp; Will Gregory Bobby Krlic | Silver Eye | 2017 | |
| "Fly Me Away" † | Goldfrapp | Alison Goldfrapp; Will Gregory | Supernature | 2005 | |
| "Felt Mountain" | Goldfrapp | Alison Goldfrapp; Will Gregory | Felt Mountain | 2000 | |
| "Forever" | Goldfrapp | Alison Goldfrapp; Will Gregory | Black Cherry | 2003 | |
| "Hairy Trees" | Goldfrapp | Alison Goldfrapp; Will Gregory | Black Cherry | 2003 | |
| "Halo" (Goldfrapp remix) | Depeche Mode and Goldfrapp | Martin Gore | Remixes 81–04 | 2004 | |
| "Happiness" † | Goldfrapp | Alison Goldfrapp; Will Gregory | Seventh Tree | 2008 | |
| "Head First" | Goldfrapp | Alison Goldfrapp; Will Gregory | Head First | 2010 | |
| "Horse Tears" | Goldfrapp | Alison Goldfrapp; Will Gregory | Felt Mountain | 2000 | |
| "Human" † | Goldfrapp | Alison Goldfrapp; Will Gregory; Tim Norfolk; Bob Locke | Felt Mountain | 2000 | |
| "Hunt" | Goldfrapp | Alison Goldfrapp; Will Gregory | Head First | 2010 | |
| "I Wanna Life" | Goldfrapp | Alison Goldfrapp; Will Gregory | Head First | 2010 | |
| "Jo" | Goldfrapp | Alison Goldfrapp; Will Gregory | Tales of Us | 2013 | |
| "Koko" | Goldfrapp | Alison Goldfrapp; Will Gregory | Supernature | 2005 | |
| "Laurel" | Goldfrapp | Alison Goldfrapp; Will Gregory | Tales of Us | 2013 | |
| "Lee" | Goldfrapp | Alison Goldfrapp; Will Gregory | Tales of Us | 2013 | |
| "Let It Take You" | Goldfrapp | Alison Goldfrapp; Will Gregory | Supernature | 2005 | |
| "Little Bird" | Goldfrapp | Alison Goldfrapp; Will Gregory | Seventh Tree | 2008 | |
| "Lovely 2 C U" | Goldfrapp | Alison Goldfrapp; Will Gregory | Supernature | 2005 | |
| "Lovely Head" † | Goldfrapp | Alison Goldfrapp; Will Gregory | Felt Mountain | 2000 | |
| "Meeting in the Moors" | Goldfrapp | Alison Goldfrapp; Will Gregory | My Summer of Love Soundtrack | 2005 | |
| "Melancholy Sky" † | Goldfrapp | Alison Goldfrapp; Will Gregory | The Singles | 2012 | |
| "Mona and Tamsin on a Rock" | Goldfrapp | Alison Goldfrapp; Will Gregory | My Summer of Love Soundtrack | 2005 | |
| "Mona at the Gate" | Goldfrapp | Alison Goldfrapp; Will Gregory | My Summer of Love Soundtrack | 2005 | |
| "Mona on the Tennis Court" | Goldfrapp | Alison Goldfrapp; Will Gregory | My Summer of Love Soundtrack | 2005 | |
| "Monster Love" | Goldfrapp | Alison Goldfrapp; Will Gregory | Seventh Tree | 2008 | |
| "Moon in Your Mouth" | Goldfrapp | Alison Goldfrapp; Will Gregory | Silver Eye | 2017 | |
| "Number 1" † | Goldfrapp | Alison Goldfrapp; Will Gregory | Supernature | 2005 | |
| "Ocean" † | Goldfrapp | Alison Goldfrapp; Will Gregory | Silver Eye | 2017 | |
| "Ooh La La" † | Goldfrapp | Alison Goldfrapp; Will Gregory | Supernature | 2005 | |
| "Oompa Radar" | Goldfrapp | Alison Goldfrapp; Will Gregory | Felt Mountain | 2000 | |
| "A Pain That I'm Used To" (Goldfrapp remix) | Depeche Mode and Goldfrapp | Martin Gore | Non-album single | 2005 | |
| "Paper Bag" | Goldfrapp | Alison Goldfrapp; Will Gregory | Felt Mountain | 2000 | |
| "Pilots" † | Goldfrapp | Alison Goldfrapp; Will Gregory | Felt Mountain | 2000 | |
| "Pulse" | Goldfrapp | Alison Goldfrapp; Will Gregory | My Summer of Love Soundtrack | 2005 | |
| "Ride a White Horse" † | Goldfrapp | Alison Goldfrapp; Will Gregory; Nick Batt | Supernature | 2005 | |
| "Road to Somewhere" | Goldfrapp | Alison Goldfrapp; Will Gregory | Seventh Tree | 2008 | |
| "Rocket" † | Goldfrapp | Alison Goldfrapp; Will Gregory | Head First | 2010 | |
| "Sadie's Room" | Goldfrapp | Alison Goldfrapp; Will Gregory | My Summer of Love Soundtrack | 2005 | |
| "Satin Chic" | Goldfrapp | Alison Goldfrapp; Will Gregory | Supernature | 2005 | |
| "Shiny and Warm" | Goldfrapp | Alison Goldfrapp; Will Gregory | Head First | 2010 | |
| "Simone" | Goldfrapp | Alison Goldfrapp; Will Gregory | Tales of Us | 2013 | |
| "Slide In" | Goldfrapp | Alison Goldfrapp; Will Gregory | Supernature | 2005 | |
| "Some People" | Goldfrapp | Alison Goldfrapp; Will Gregory | Seventh Tree | 2008 | |
| "Stranger" | Goldfrapp | Alison Goldfrapp; Will Gregory | Tales of Us | 2013 | |
| "Strict Machine" † | Goldfrapp | Alison Goldfrapp; Will Gregory; Nick Batt | Black Cherry | 2003 | |
| "Systemagic" † | Goldfrapp | Alison Goldfrapp; Will Gregory | Silver Eye | 2017 | |
| "The W.A.N.D. (The Will Always Negates Defeat)" (Supernaturalistic – Goldfrapp remix) | The Flaming Lips and Goldfrapp | Wayne Coyne; Michael Ivins; Steven Drozd; Kliph Scurlock | Non-album single | 2006 | |
| "Thea" † | Goldfrapp | Alison Goldfrapp; Will Gregory | Tales of Us | 2013 | |
| "This Is the New Shit" (Goldfrapp remix) | Marilyn Manson vs. Goldfrapp | John William Lowery; Tim Sköld; Brian Hugh Warner | Non-album single | 2005 | |
| "Tigerman" | Goldfrapp | Alison Goldfrapp; Will Gregory | Silver Eye | 2017 | |
| "Time Out from the World" | Goldfrapp | Alison Goldfrapp; Will Gregory | Supernature | 2005 | |
| "Tiptoe" | Goldfrapp | Alison Goldfrapp; Will Gregory | Black Cherry | 2003 | |
| "Train" † | Goldfrapp | Alison Goldfrapp; Will Gregory | Black Cherry | 2003 | |
| "Twist" † | Goldfrapp | Alison Goldfrapp; Will Gregory | Black Cherry | 2003 | |
| "Ulla" | Goldfrapp | Alison Goldfrapp; Will Gregory | Tales of Us | 2013 | |
| "Utopia" † | Goldfrapp | Alison Goldfrapp; Will Gregory | Felt Mountain | 2000 | |
| "U.K. Girls (Physical)" | Goldfrapp | Steve Kipner; Terry Shaddick | Felt Mountain | 2000 | |
| "Voicething" | Goldfrapp | Alison Goldfrapp; Will Gregory | Head First | 2010 | |
| "We Radiate" | Goldfrapp | Alison Goldfrapp; Will Gregory | The Vampire Diaries Soundtrack | 2010 | |
| "White Soft Rope" | Goldfrapp featuring the Midwich Children Choir | Alison Goldfrapp; Will Gregory | B-side to "Strict Machine" | 2003 | |
| "Winter Wonderland" | Various artists | Felix Bernard; Richard B. Smith | Non-album single | 2008 | |
| "Yellow Halo" † | Goldfrapp | Alison Goldfrapp; Will Gregory | The Singles | 2012 | |
| "Yes Sir" | Goldfrapp | Frank Dostal; Rolf Soja | Black Cherry | 2003 | |
| "You Never Know" | Goldfrapp | Alison Goldfrapp; Will Gregory | Supernature | 2005 | |
| "Zodiac Black" | Goldfrapp | Alison Goldfrapp; Will Gregory | Silver Eye | 2017 | |
