= Goldfrapp discography =

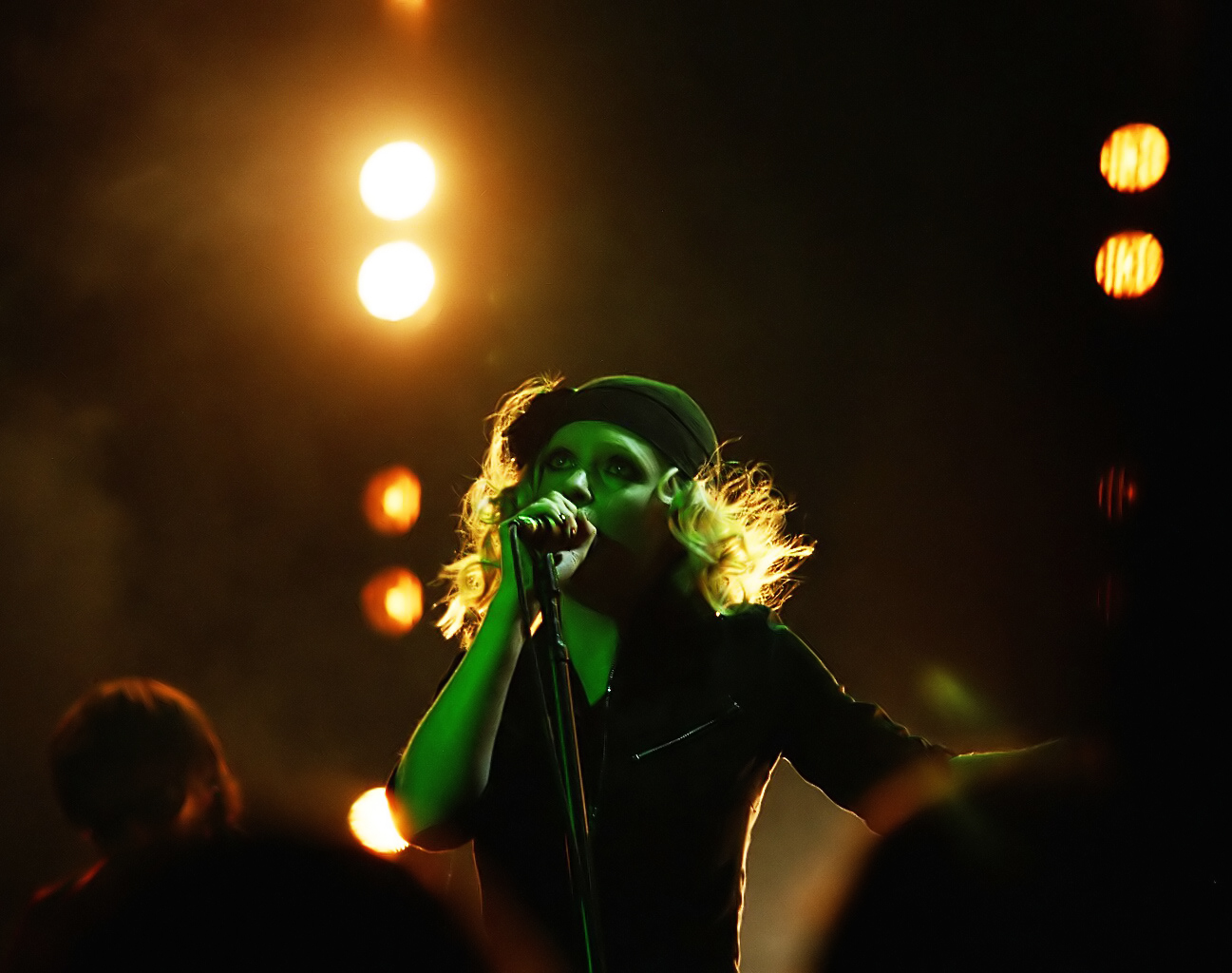
- Alison Goldfrapp performing in 2005
- Studio albums: 7
- Extended plays: 4
- Live albums: 2
- Compilation albums: 2
- Singles: 25
- Video albums: 1
- Music videos: 29
- Promotional singles: 8

English electronic music duo Goldfrapp have released seven studio albums, two live albums, two compilation albums, four extended plays, 25 singles, eight promotional singles, one video album and 29 music videos. The band was formed in 1999 in London, and consists of Alison Goldfrapp (vocals, synthesiser) and Will Gregory (synthesiser).

Goldfrapp's debut studio album Felt Mountain was released in September 2000. The album reached number 57 on the United Kingdom albums chart and was certified gold by the British Phonographic Industry (BPI). In 2001, it was shortlisted for the Mercury Prize in the UK. Black Cherry, their second album, was released in April 2003. The album reached the UK Top 20 and has been certified Platinum by the BPI. Singles from the album, particularly the UK Top 20 hit "Strict Machine", experienced success on the UK Singles Chart and across nightclubs in North America, influencing the dance-oriented sound of future releases.

In August 2005, the duo released their third album Supernature. The album reached number two in the UK, where it was certified Platinum, and is Goldfrapp's best-selling album, with over one million copies sold worldwide. The album produced two UK Top Ten hits with "Ooh La La" and "Number 1", and the Top 20 hit "Ride a White Horse", two of which also became number-one US Hot Dance Club Play hits,. The album was nominated for Best Electronic/Dance Album at the 49th Grammy Awards in 2007. Goldfrapp's fourth album Seventh Tree was followed in 2008. The album, which featured the UK Top Ten hit "A&E", peaked at number two in the UK and reached the top 20 of several other national album charts, including in Australia, Austria, Belgium and Ireland. Head First, Goldfrapp's fifth studio album, was released in March 2010. It reached number six in the UK and produced three singles: "Rocket", "Alive" and "Believer". Goldfrapp's sixth studio album, Tales of Us, was released in September 2013, peaking at number four on the UK Albums Chart. Goldfrapp's seventh studio album Silver Eye, was released in March 2017, and reached number six in the UK, becoming the duo's fifth Top Ten album. It produced four singles: "Anymore", "Systemagic", "Everything Is Never Enough" and "Ocean" featuring Dave Gahan.

== Albums ==
=== Studio albums ===
List of studio albums, with selected chart positions, sales figures and certifications
Title	Details	Peak chart positions										Certifications	Sales
Title	Details	UK	AUS	AUT	BEL (FL)	FRA	GER	IRE	NZ	SWI	US	Certifications	Sales
Felt Mountain	Released: 11 September 2000; Label: Mute; Formats: CD, LP, digital download	57	44	44	—	48	36	—	—	98	—	BPI: Gold	World: 500,000; UK: 177,096; US: 52,000
Black Cherry	Released: 23 April 2003; Label: Mute; Formats: CD, LP, digital download	19	71	—	46	45	25	30	—	41	— (Note: Black Cherry did not enter the US Billboard 200, but did peak at number 30 on the Heatseekers Albums chart.)	BPI: Platinum	UK: 256,703; US: 52,000
Supernature	Released: 17 August 2005; Label: Mute; Formats: CD, LP, digital download	2	23	33	16	43	26	9	35	29	138	BPI: Platinum; IRMA: Gold	World: 1,000,000; UK: 500,000; US: 49,000
Seventh Tree	Released: 22 February 2008; Label: Mute; Formats: CD, LP, digital download	2	11	37	10	37	21	9	39	11	48	BPI: Gold	UK: 200,062
Head First	Released: 19 March 2010; Label: Mute; Formats: CD, LP, digital download	6	14	33	35	70	28	17	18	14	45	BPI: Silver	UK: 70,000
Tales of Us	Released: 6 September 2013; Label: Mute; Formats: CD, LP, digital download	4	15	24	6	33	9	15	—	8	75	BPI: Silver	
Silver Eye	Released: 31 March 2017; Label: Mute; Formats: CD, LP, digital download	6	20	27	25	57	31	19	— (Note: Silver Eye did not enter the New Zealand Albums Chart, but peaked at number three on the New Zealand Heatseeker Albums Chart.)	24	118		
"—" denotes a recording that did not chart or was not released in that territory.

=== Live albums ===
Title	Details
Live 2005 (Note: Live 2005 was released as a series of six limited-edition double albums recorded live during Goldfrapp's tour in October 2005.)	Released: 3–11 October 2005; Label: Live Here Now; Format: CD-R
iTunes Originals	Released: 30 September 2008; Label: Mute; Format: Digital download

=== Compilation albums ===
List of compilation albums, with selected chart positions
Title	Details	Peak chart positions					Certifications
Title	Details	UK	IRE	SWI	US Dance	US Indie	Certifications
We Are Glitter	Released: 17 October 2006; Label: Mute; Formats: CD, digital download	—	—	—	8	48	
The Singles	Released: 3 February 2012; Label: Mute, Parlophone; Formats: CD, digital download	33	77	98	19	—	BPI: Silver
"—" denotes a recording that did not chart or was not released in that territory.

== Extended plays ==
Title	Details
Wonderful Electric: Live in London	Released: 27 September 2004; Label: Mute; Format: Digital download
Ride a White Horse: Live in London E.P.	Released: 13 February 2006; Label: Mute; Format: Digital download
Live Session EP	Released: 26 December 2006; Label: Mute; Format: Digital download
iTunes Festival: London 2010	Released: 26 July 2010; Label: Mute; Format: Digital download

== Singles ==
List of singles, with selected chart positions, showing year released and album name
Title	Year	Peak chart positions										Album
Title	Year	UK	AUS	AUT	BEL (FL)	GER	IRE	SPA	SWI	US Sales	US Dance	Album
"Lovely Head"	2000	—	—	—	—	—	—	—	—	—	—	Felt Mountain
"Utopia"	2000	131	—	—	—	—	—	—	—	—	—	Felt Mountain
"Human"	2001	87	—	—	—	—	—	—	—	—	—	Felt Mountain
"Utopia (Genetically Enriched)"	2001	62	—	—	—	—	—	—	—	—	—	Felt Mountain
"Pilots (On a Star)" / "Lovely Head"	2001	68	—	—	—	—	—	—	—	—	—	Felt Mountain
"Train"	2003	23	—	—	—	—	—	—	—	64	— (Note: "Train" did not enter the Hot Dance Club Songs chart, but peaked at number 10 on the Hot Dance Singles Sales chart.)	Black Cherry
"Strict Machine"	2003	20 (Note: "Strict Machine" originally reached number 25 on the UK Singles Chart, but reached a new peak of number 20 when re-released in May 2004.)	54	—	—	—	—	—	—	36	1	Black Cherry
"Twist"	2004	31	—	—	—	—	—	—	—	—	— (Note: "Twist" did not enter the Hot Dance Club Songs chart, but peaked at number 18 on the Hot Dance Singles Sales chart.)	Black Cherry
"Black Cherry"	2004	28	—	—	—	—	—	—	—	—	— (Note: "Black Cherry" did not enter the Hot Dance Club Songs chart, but peaked at number 15 on the Hot Dance Singles Sales chart.)	Black Cherry
"Ooh La La"	2005	4	36	—	— (Note: "Ooh La La" did not enter the Ultratop 50, but peaked at number 12 on the Flemish Ultratip chart.)	82	16	1	96	—	1	Supernature
"Number 1"	2005	9	—	—	—	73	29	11	—	8	1	Supernature
"Ride a White Horse"	2006	15	—	—	—	—	36	7	—	38	29	Supernature
"Fly Me Away"	2006	26	—	—	—	—	40	—	—	—	6	Supernature
"Satin Boys, Flaming Chic"	2006	—	—	—	—	—	—	—	—	—	—	We Are Glitter
"A&E"	2008	10	85	—	38	98	33	—	—	2	22	Seventh Tree
"Happiness"	2008	25	—	—	—	—	—	—	—	—	—	Seventh Tree
"Caravan Girl"	2008	54	—	—	—	—	—	—	—	25	— (Note: "Caravan Girl" did not enter the Hot Dance Club Songs chart, but peaked at number nine on the Hot Dance Singles Sales chart.)	Seventh Tree
"Clowns"	2008	115	—	—	—	—	—	—	—	—	—	Seventh Tree
"Rocket"	2010	47	55	38	— (Note: "Rocket" did not enter the Ultratop 50, but peaked at number 19 on the Flemish Ultratip chart.)	32	36	—	50	4	1	Head First
"Alive"	2010	—	—	—	—	—	—	—	—	25	1	Head First
"Believer"	2010	180	—	—	—	—	—	—	—	31	31	Head First
"Melancholy Sky"	2012	—	—	—	—	—	—	—	—	—	—	The Singles
"Thea"	2014	—	—	—	—	—	—	—	—	8	—	Tales of Us
"Anymore"	2017	—	—	—	—	—	—	—	—	—	—	Silver Eye
"Systemagic"	2017	—	—	—	—	—	—	—	—	—	—	Silver Eye
"Everything Is Never Enough"	2017	—	—	—	—	—	—	—	—	—	—	Silver Eye
"Ocean" (featuring Dave Gahan)	2018	—	—	—	—	—	—	—	—	—	—	Silver Eye
"—" denotes a recording that did not chart or was not released in that territory.

=== Promotional singles ===
List of promotional singles, with selected chart positions, showing year released and album name
Title	Year	Peaks	Album
Title	Year	BEL Tip (FL)	Album
"Big Black Cloud, Little White Lie"	2003	—	Non-album singles
"Yes Sir"	2003	—	Non-album singles
"Slide In"	2005	—	Supernature
"Winter Wonderland"	2008	—	Winter Wonderland
"Drew"	2013	86	Tales of Us
"Annabel"	2013	—	Tales of Us
"Ocean"	2017	—	Silver Eye
"Moon in Your Mouth"	2017	—	Silver Eye
"—" denotes a recording that did not chart or was not released in that territory.

== Guest appearances ==
List of non-single guest appearances, showing year released and album name
Title	Year	Album
"End Titles" (with Adrian Utley)	2001	Accelerator: The Soundtrack
"Mona on the Tennis Court"	2005	My Summer of Love
"Meeting in the Moors"	2005	My Summer of Love
"Pulse"	2005	My Summer of Love
"Mona and Tamsin on a Rock"	2005	My Summer of Love
"Sadie's Room"	2005	My Summer of Love
"Mona at the Gate"	2005	My Summer of Love
"It's Not Over Yet"	2008	Radio 1's Live Lounge – Volume 3
"Sex Exciter"	2010	Any Which Way
"We Radiate"	2010	The Vampire Diaries: Original Television Soundtrack

== Remixes ==
List of remixes by Goldfrapp for other artists, showing year released and album name
Title	Year	Artist
"This Is the New Shit" (Marilyn Manson vs. Goldfrapp)	2003	Marilyn Manson
"Halo" (Goldfrapp remix)	2004	Depeche Mode
"A Pain That I'm Used To" (Goldfrapp remix)	2005	Depeche Mode
"The W.A.N.D. Supernaturalistic" (Goldfrapp remix)	2006	The Flaming Lips
"Judas" (Goldfrapp remix)	2011	Lady Gaga

== Videography ==
=== Video albums ===
List of video albums, with selected chart positions
Title	Details	Peaks
Title	Details	UK
Wonderful Electric: Live in London	Released: 27 September 2004; Label: Mute; Format: DVD	9

=== Music videos ===
List of music videos, showing year released and directors
Title	Year	Director(s)	Ref.
"Lovely Head" (version one)	2000	Wolfgang Tillmans	
"Lovely Head" (version two)	2000	Wolfgang Tillmans	
"Utopia"	2000	Dylan Kendle	
"Human"	2001	Jake Scott	
"Pilots (On a Star)"	2001	James Griffiths	
"Train"	2003	Dawn Shadforth	
"Strict Machine"	2003	Jonas Odell	
"Twist"	2004	H5	
"Black Cherry"	2004	The Makers	
"Ooh La La"	2005	Dawn Shadforth	
"Number 1"	2005	Dawn Shadforth	
"Ride a White Horse"	2006	Diane Martel	
"Fly Me Away"	2006	Andreas Nilsson	
"A&E"	2008	Dougal Wilson	
"Happiness"	2008	Dougal Wilson	
"Clowns" (Super 8)	2008	Alison Goldfrapp and Francis Kennard	
"Caravan Girl"	2008	The Malloys	
"Rocket"	2010	Kim Gehrig	
"Alive"	2010	Legs	
"Believer"	2010	Lisa Gunning	
"Yellow Halo"	2011	Lisa Gunning	
"Drew"	2013	Lisa Gunning	
"Annabel"	2013	Lisa Gunning	
"Thea" (Tales of Us Live Projection)	2014	Lisa Gunning	
"Jo"	2014	Lisa Gunning	
"Stranger"	2014	Lisa Gunning	
"Laurel"	2014	Lisa Gunning	
"Anymore"	2017	Mary Calderwell	
"Systemagic"	2017	Alison Goldfrapp	
"Everything Is Never Enough"	2017	Alison Goldfrapp	
"Ocean" (featuring Dave Gahan)	2018	Alison Goldfrapp	
