= The Singles (Goldfrapp album) =

Compilation album by Goldfrapp
- Released: 3 February 2012
- Recorded: 1999–2011
- Studio: Wiltshire, Bath and London
- Genre: Synth-pop; electroclash; trip hop; ambient; glam rock
- Length: 54:42
- Label: Mute; Parlophone
- Producer: Nick Batt; Flood; Pascal Gabriel; Will Gregory; Alison Goldfrapp; Jeremy Wheatley

Goldfrapp chronology
Head First (2010)	The Singles (2012)	Tales of Us (2013)

Singles from The Singles
- 1. "Melancholy Sky" Released: 3 January 2012

The Singles is a compilation album by English electronic music duo Goldfrapp, released on 3 February 2012 by Mute Records and Parlophone. The album features singles from the duo's first five studio albums, as well as two previously unreleased tracks, "Yellow Halo" and "Melancholy Sky".

== Background and release ==
Following the duo's departure from EMI in August 2010, it was confirmed in April 2011 that Goldfrapp had begun work on their sixth studio album. In December 2011, it was announced that a 14-track retrospective compilation titled The Singles would be released on 6 February 2012 by Mute Records and Parlophone, including the biggest singles from their five studio albums, as well as two brand-new songs, "Melancholy Sky" and "Yellow Halo". "Melancholy Sky" was released on 3 January 2012 as the compilation's lead single, while a video for "Yellow Halo" was directed by Lisa Gunning and entirely shot on Gunning's iPhone in South America.

== Critical reception ==
Professional ratings
Aggregate scores
Source	Rating
Metacritic	85/100
Review scores
Source	Rating
AllMusic	4.5/5 stars
Daily Express	4/5
Digital Spy	5/5 stars
DIY	9/10
Drowned in Sound	8/10
entertainment.ie	4/5 stars
musicOMH	4/5 stars
Pitchfork	8.4/10
PopMatters	9/10
Slant Magazine	4.5/5 stars

The Singles received critical acclaim from music critics. At Metacritic, which assigns a normalised rating out of 100 to reviews from mainstream publications, the album received an average score of 85, based on 14 reviews. AllMusic editor Heather Phares commented that the album "shows that [the duo's] craftsmanship and good taste may have been their most defining quality", while noting that "[t]heir style-hopping sounds less like searching for what will stick and more like the product of two restlessly creative artists who had the talent to do just about anything they wanted and tried a little of everything." Pitchfork's Matthew Perpetua wrote that Goldfrapp "have spent the past decade moving back and forth between icy electro-glam and atmospheric balladry, delivering these extremes in tonally consistent albums that dare to alienate listeners who favor one style over the other." Matt James of PopMatters commented, "Over the course of five albums, Goldfrapp have proved themselves one of the most imaginative, artistic and entertaining bands of this new century", concluding that the compilation "offers an intriguing introduction to one of Britain's premier pop art bands." Drowned in Sound's David Edwards opined that "the most striking thing from their singles compilation is that within this, they actually managed to craft some rather excellent pieces of pop orientated electronica", adding that on The Singles, Goldfrapp are "exactly how they wanted the world to see them: sleek, intelligent, flirtatious and deliciously off their tits."

Martyn Young of DIY described the compilation as "a triumph of compellingly brilliant classy pop". Jaime Gill of BBC Music raved, "Fourteen songs that veer between the perfect and the merely outstanding, The Singles is proof that Goldfrapp have been the most versatile and most consistently, glitteringly brilliant pop band of our new millennium." In a review for the Daily Express, Simon Gage found that the duo "has built up quite a body of work as displayed on this gorgeous little collection", writing that "[w]hile their albums are well-worth discovering and hugely well-received, the singles showcase some excellent work". Lewis Corner of Digital Spy stated, "For over a decade the duo have been writing consistently fantastic pop songs—and here is the proof." Elaine Buckley of Entertainment.ie commended the duo for their "wonderful electric stylings" and wrote that "the songs of The Singles are still as impressive as ever." Slant Magazine's Matthew Cole viewed the compilation as "a terrific showcase for Goldfrapp's versatility, though on the crucial point of whether or not their midtempo and ambient numbers are as essential as their dance hits, it's not entirely convincing." John Murphy of musicOMH expressed, "Whereas each of Goldfrapp's albums occasionally had the odd filler track that stopped them from being gilt-edged classics, here we get all the meat and none of the fat [...] there's so much pop sensibility crammed in here that each track sounds almost impossibly fresh."

== Track listing ==
All tracks are written by Alison Goldfrapp and Will Gregory, except where noted.

No.	Title	Writer(s)	Album	Length
1.	"Ooh La La"		Supernature (2005)	3:25
2.	"Number 1"		Supernature	3:25
3.	"Strict Machine" (single mix)	Goldfrapp; Gregory; Nick Batt	Black Cherry (2003)	3:42
4.	"Lovely Head"		Felt Mountain (2000)	3:47
5.	"Utopia (Genetically Enriched)"		Felt Mountain	3:51
6.	"A&E"		Seventh Tree (2008)	3:18
7.	"Happiness" (single version)		Seventh Tree	3:37
8.	"Train"		Black Cherry	4:11
9.	"Ride a White Horse" (single version)	Goldfrapp; Gregory; Batt	Supernature	3:44
10.	"Rocket"		Head First (2010)	3:52
11.	"Believer"		Head First	3:44
12.	"Black Cherry"		Black Cherry	4:56
13.	"Yellow Halo"		previously unreleased	4:42
14.	"Melancholy Sky"		previously unreleased	4:28
Total length:				54:42

iTunes Store bonus tracks
No.	Title	Album	Length
15.	"Utopia" (Plaid Remix)	Felt Mountain	4:41
16.	"Alive" (Cereal Spiller Remix)	Head First	4:19

== Personnel ==
Credits adapted from the liner notes of The Singles.

- Goldfrapp – arrangement, engineering, production (all tracks); mixing (tracks 4, 8, 12); art direction
- Jonathan Allen – string engineering (track 6); string engineering (track 7)
- Alexander Bălănescu – violin (track 5)
- Jim Barr – additional engineering (track 5)
- David Bascombe – vocal arrangement (track 2); mixing (tracks 3, 5)
- Nick Batt – synthesiser (tracks 1, 2, 9); additional programming (tracks 2–5, 8–12); additional engineering (tracks 3, 5, 8, 12); additional synthesiser (tracks 3, 7, 8, 12); bass synthesiser (track 4); additional drum programming (track 6); additional production and beat (track 7)
- Steve Claydon – synthesiser (track 5)
- Jon Collyer – additional programming (track 9)
- John Dent – mastering (track 4)
- Alex Dromgoole – assistant engineering (tracks 1, 2)
- Bruno Ellingham – additional engineering (track 11); additional programming (tracks 13, 14)
- Tom Elmhirst – mixing (tracks 3, 8, 12)
- David Emery – assistant engineering (tracks 1, 2)
- Steve Evans – acoustic guitar (track 6)
- Flood – guitar (track 6); mixing (tracks 6, 14); keyboards (tracks 6, 7); additional production and mixing (track 13); acoustic guitar, sequencer (track 14)
- Greg Freeman – drum recording (tracks 10, 14)
- Pascal Gabriel – additional production (tracks 10, 11)
- Tim Goldsworthy – additional programming (tracks 10, 11)
- Stuart Gordon – viola, violin (track 4)
- Matty Green – mixing assistant (tracks 10, 11)
- Lee Groves – additional mix programming (track 1)
- Tony Hoffer – overdub engineering (track 6); mixing (track 7)
- Nick Ingman – string orchestration and conduction (tracks 6, 7, 12)
- Ted Jensen – mastering (tracks 1, 2, 10, 11)
- Charlie Jones – bass (tracks 1, 3, 7, 9, 10, 14)
- Alex Lee – guitar (track 10)
- Mark Linkous – Casio (track 8)
- David Lord – additional engineering (track 5)
- Ged Lynch – drums (track 10)
- Mat Maitland – collage
- Stephen Marcussen – mastering (tracks 6, 7, 13, 14)
- Mike Marsh – mastering (tracks 8, 12)
- Stephen Marshall – assistant string engineering (tracks 6, 7)
- Justin Meldal-Johnsen – bass (track 6)
- Metro Voices – choir (track 7)
- Daniel Miller – synthesiser (track 9)
- Bill Mims – overdub engineering (track 6); mixing assistant (track 7)
- Yoad Nevo – additional programming (track 3)
- Jenny O'Grady – choir master (track 7)
- Rowen Oliver – additional engineering (track 6); drums, percussion (track 8); additional drum programming (track 12)
- Tim Oliver – additional engineering (track 7)
- Steve Orchard – string engineering and submixing (track 12)
- Tony Orrell – drums (track 5)
- Daisy Palmer – drums (tracks 13, 14); percussion (track 14)
- John Parish – drums (track 4)
- Ewan Pearson – additional programming (track 9)
- Patrick Phillips – mixing assistant (tracks 13, 14)
- Dave Power – additional drums (track 9)
- Damon Reece – drums (tracks 3, 7); percussion (track 7)
- Tim Roe – assistant engineering (track 2)
- Davide Rossi – violin (track 10)
- Andy Savoun – additional programming, mixing assistant (tracks 13, 14)
- Sonia Slany – violin (track 5)
- Mark 'Spike' Stent – mixing (tracks 1, 2, 10, 11); original mixing (track 9)
- Leo Taylor – drums (track 10)
- Adrian Utley – guitar (tracks 1, 8); bass (tracks 4, 8)
- Ruth Wall – harp samples (track 6)
- Chris Weston – additional programming (tracks 4, 5)
- Denny Weston Jr. – drums (track 6)
- Jeremy Wheatley – additional production and mixing (track 3); single version mixing (track 9)

== Charts ==
Chart (2012)	Peak position
Belgian Heatseekers Albums (Ultratop Flanders)	8
Belgian Heatseekers Albums (Ultratop Wallonia)	11
Croatian International Albums (HDU)	20
Irish Albums (IRMA)	77
Scottish Albums (OCC)	37
Swiss Albums (Schweizer Hitparade)	98
UK Albums (OCC)	33

== Certifications ==
Region	Certification	Certified units/sales
United Kingdom (BPI)	Silver	60,000^{‡}
^{‡} Sales+streaming figures based on certification alone.

== Release history ==
Region	Date	Format	Label	Ref.
Australia	3 February 2012	CD; digital download	EMI	
Germany	3 February 2012	CD; digital download	EMI	
Ireland	3 February 2012	CD; digital download	Mute; Parlophone	
United Kingdom	6 February 2012	CD; digital download	Mute; Parlophone	
Japan	6 February 2012	CD; digital download	EMI	
United States	7 February 2012	CD; digital download	Astralwerks; Mute	
Sweden	8 February 2012	CD; digital download	EMI	
Italy	28 February 2012	CD; digital download	EMI	
