= Head First World Tour =

2010 concert tour by Goldfrapp

- Tour by Goldfrapp
- Associated album: Head First
- Start date: 7 June 2010
- End date: 26 November 2010
- No. of shows: 47 shows in total

Goldfrapp concert chronology
- Supernature World Tour (2005–2007); Head First World Tour (2010); Tales of Us Tour (2013 - )

Head First is the fifth concert tour from British band Goldfrapp in support of their fifth studio album, Head First, released in March 2010.

== Development ==
The tour was announced in early February 2010, with the release of their new album by their record company Mute. The band announced dates in Europe, Australia and North America, where they played the famous Hollywood Bowl. Mute announced that the band would play festivals throughout summer 2010, then embark on their tour. Before the festivals, however, they were due to play their American dates as stated here officially: "Goldfrapp will take Head First to select US cities this summer - following the massive acclaim for both the Supernature and Seventh Tree tours and festival appearances around the world, Goldfrapp have underlined their reputation as one of the most transcendent and inventive live bands around."

Dates for the United Kingdom were announced on the band's website on 12 July 2010.

== Show ==
Goldfrapp open with "Voicething" as the band come on stage, with smoke billowing out of the stage. Alison then appears and launches into "Crystalline Green", with a green light show playing around her. Each song from this point uses the lights, with different colours. The background of the stage is a massive Space Doughnut.

== Band ==
The band consists of 5 members (including Alison Goldfrapp). These are:

- Charlie Jones - bass guitar
- Daisy Palmer - drums, backing vocals
- Angie Pollock - keyboards, backing vocals
- Davide Rossi - keyboards, guitar, violin, backing vocals

== Set list ==
Warm Up Gigs
1. Voicething (Intro)
2. Crystalline Green
3. Train
4. I Wanna Life
5. A&E
6. You Never Know
7. Head First
8. Number 1
9. Believer
10. Shiny & Warm
11. Alive
12. Ride a White Horse (extended)
13. Ooh La La
14. Utopia
15. Rocket
16. Strict Machine (We are glitter)
Main set list

Main order of songs - Order has changed in some cases.

1. Voicething (intro)
2. Crystalline Green
3. I Wanna Life
4. A&E
5. You Never Know
6. Head First
7. Number 1
8. Dreaming
9. Believer
10. Alive
11. Shiny & Warm
12. Train
13. Ride A White Horse (extended)
14. Ooh La La
15. Utopia
16. Black Cherry
17. Rocket
18. Strict Machine (We are glitter)

Additional notes:

- "Dreaming" was added and "You Never Know" was removed from the set list in Washington.
- "You Never Know" was re-added in New York.
- "Utopia" was removed from the set list in Mexico.
- "Hunt" was added for the Norwich concert.
UK set list

Main order of songs - order has changed in some cases.

1. Voicething (intro)
2. Crystalline Green
3. You Never Know
4. Dreaming
5. I Wanna Life
6. Head First
7. Number 1
8. Alive
9. Believer
10. Shiny & Warm
11. Train
12. Ride a White Horse (extended)
13. Ooh La La
14. Black Cherry
15. Little Bird
16. Lovely Head
17. Rocket
18. Strict Machine (We are glitter)

Additional notes:

- "Hunt" was added for the Norwich concert.
- "Rocket" was removed in Bristol.
Festivals set list
1. Voicething
2. Utopia
3. You Never Know
4. Head First
5. Dreaming
6. Number 1
7. Believer
8. Alive
9. Shiny and Warm
10. Train
11. Ride a White Horse (extended)
12. Ooh La La
13. Rocket
14. Strict Machine (We are glitter)

== Critical reception ==
=== Concerts ===
Reviews for the tour have all been positive. Spinner, talking of the Hollywood Bowl appearance, said, "Golfrapp made her way through 12 songs backed by a tight four-piece band. If the band was daunted at all by the huge stage of the Bowl, they never showed it, opening with a version of 'Crystalline Green' that won the crowd over from the outset. The group really hit its stride halfway through the set, as two songs from the new 'Head First' album -- the pop-laden 'Believer' and 'Alive' -- had fans dancing in the Bowl aisles.".

The Washington Post review was also very positive, stating, "Goldfrapp has built up quite a cult. The performance was sold out and a few devout fans even showed up wearing blonde wigs. Over an hour and a half set Goldfrapp changed costumes--musical and otherwise--a few times, putting a digital spin on pretty much every genre that has ever aspired to fabulousness--including glam-rock, disco, and a few Bond-theme-worthy ballads. It was a familiar sound with a futuristic finish."

The Entertainment Weekly review of the New York gig's headline was "Goldfrapp at NYC's Hammerstein Ballroom....It's Finally Lovely 2 C U" also stated, "'Voicething' was a brilliant opener, launching right into the thumping 'Crystalline Green' from 2003′s Black Cherry. Alison, in full sparkle mode, started stomping around right away and quickly lost herself in a dizzying feast of outstretched arms and those ethereal wails we know and love."

Australian magazine TheVine's review was positive, with the reviewer stating "she has an amazing range that puts her in the same league as Kate Bush." They also stated, "Goldfrapp will take you on a journey through the darkened slums, the seedy clubs, the flamboyant nightspots and the palatial high rises."

On the start of their UK tour, reviews have been positive. ThisisBristol proclaimed, "In a pop world almost devoid of eccentricity and risk-taking, thank God for Alison Goldfrapp." Giving them 7/10, they also stated "Much copied, never bettered, Goldfrapp's disco weirdness is still a treat."

=== Festival reviews ===
The Big Issue gave a positive review: "Alison Goldfrapp has to win some kind of prize for most stylish lady of the weekend. TBI feels rude for being so covered in mud in her presence, as she sways in a sparkly black poncho (billowed by a strategically placed fan...). The incredibly visual set is punctuated by hit after hit ('Number One', 'White Horse', 'Train'), all led by Goldfrapp's sensual, ethereal vocals and underwritten by undulating synths and retro basslines. "Scotland, you’re gorgeous", she says. No, Alison. You are."

The Scotsman commented, "Goldfrapp brought their usual artfully choreographed flamboyance and glamour to another full-on irresistible performance."

== Tour dates ==
Date	City	Country	Venue
7 June 2010	Oxford	England	O2 Academy Oxford
8 June 2010	Leamington Spa	England	The Assembly
11 June 2010	Moscow	Russia	B1 Maximum
21 June 2010	Washington, D.C.	United States	9:30 Club
23 June 2010	New York City	United States	Hammerstein Ballroom
26 June 2010	Oakland	United States	Fox Oakland Theatre
27 June 2010	Los Angeles	United States	Hollywood Bowl
29 June 2010	Mexico City	Mexico	José Cuervo Salón
9 July 2010	Punchestown	Ireland	Punchestown Racecourse
11 July 2010	Balado	Scotland	T in the Park
15 July 2010	Cabedelo	Portugal	Marés Vivas Festival
17 July 2010	Benicàssim	Spain	Festival Internacional de Benicàssim Heineken
18 July 2010	Ferropolis	Germany	Melt! Festival
22 July 2010	London	England	iTunes Festival
29 July 2010	Sydney	Australia	Luna Park
30 July 2010	Brisbane	Australia	The Tivoli
1 August 2010	Woodford	Australia	Splendour in the Grass
3 August 2010	Melbourne	Australia	Palace Theatre
14 August 2010	Avenches	Switzerland	Rock Oz'Arènes
16 August 2010	Luxembourg	Luxembourg	Den Atelier
18 August 2010	Amsterdam	Netherlands	Paradiso
21 August 2010	Chelmsford	England	V Festival
22 August 2010	Stafford	England	V Festival
28 August 2010	London	England	L.E.D. Festival
22 September 2010	Lisbon	Portugal	Coliseu dos Recreios
24 September 2010	Barcelona	Spain	BAM (Barcelona Acció Cultural)
25 September 2010	Madrid	Spain	La Riviera
27 September 2010	Cologne	Germany	Essigfabrik
28 September 2010	Lille	France	L'Aeronef
30 September 2010	Hamburg	Germany	Docks
2 October 2010	Berlin	Germany	Astra Kulturhaus
4 October 2010	Munich	Germany	Muffathalle
5 October 2010	Zürich	Switzerland	X-TRA Hotel
7 October 2010	Milan	Italy	Magazzini Generali
8 October 2010	Ljubljana	Slovenia	Kino Siska Centre
12 October 2010	Prague	Czech Republic	Sasazu Club
13 October 2010	Vienna	Austria	Gasometer
15 October 2010	Warsaw	Poland	Free Form Festival
17 October 2010	Copenhagen	Denmark	Vega Concert Hall
18 October 2010	Oslo	Norway	Rockefeller Music Hall
8 November 2010	Norwich	England	UEA
9 November 2010	Bristol	England	O2 Academy Bristol
11 November 2010	London	England	Hammersmith Apollo
13 November 2010	Brighton	England	Brighton Dome
14 November 2010	Birmingham	England	O2 Academy Birmingham
16 November 2010	Leeds	England	O2 Academy Leeds
17 November 2010	Manchester	England	Manchester Academy
19 November 2010	Glasgow	Scotland	O2 Academy Glasgow
20 November 2010	Newcastle	England	O2 Academy Newcastle
22 November 2010	Paris	France	Theatre Le Trianon
23 November 2010	Brussels	Belgium	Ancienne Belgique
25 November 2010	Drogheda	Ireland	TLT Theatre*
26 November 2010	Dublin	Ireland	Olympia Theatre
27 November 2010	Dublin	Ireland	Olympia Theatre

- A free show as part of the Heineken Green Spheres, a free music series in Ireland

== Sold-out shows ==
The show on 26 November in Dublin sold out, and due to high demand a second date was immediately announced.
