= Live Session =

Live Session may refer to:

- Live Session EP (iTunes Exclusive), a 2009 release by 3OH!3
- Live Session, a 2008 released by Alessi's Ark
- Live Session (iTunes Exclusive) (Blakes EP), released in 2008
- Live Session!, a live album by Cannonball Adderley, released in 1964
- Live Session (iTunes Exclusive), a 2006 release by Cat Power
- Live Session EP (iTunes Exclusive), a 2008 released by City and Colour
- Live Session (Goldfrapp EP), released in 2006
- Live Session EP (iTunes Exclusive), a 2006 release by Imogen Heap
- Live Session EP, a 2007 release by Jeremy Camp
- Live Session EP (Josh Kelley), released in 2005
- Live Session EP, a 2005 release by Lifehouse
- Live Session (Nelly Furtado EP), released in 2006
- Live Session EP (iTunes Exclusive), a 2006 release by Panic! at the Disco
- Live Session (iTunes Exclusive), a 2007 release by Papa Roach
- Live Session, a 2007 release by Rodrigo y Gabriela
- Live Session EP, a 2007 release by Sara Bareilles
- Live Session EP (iTunes Exclusive), a 2006 release by The Weepies

== See also ==
- Live Sessions (disambiguation)
- Live Recordings (disambiguation)
- Live album
