= ITunes Originals: Goldfrapp =

2008 live album by Goldfrapp

iTunes Originals: Goldfrapp

Live album by Goldfrapp
- Released: 30 September 2008
- Venue: Electric Lady (New York City)
- Genre: Electronic; pop; folk
- Label: Mute
- Producer: Alison Goldfrapp; Will Gregory

Goldfrapp chronology
Seventh Tree (2008)	iTunes Originals: Goldfrapp (2008)	Head First (2010)

iTunes Originals: Goldfrapp is a live album by English electronic music duo Goldfrapp, released exclusively through iTunes by Mute Records on 30 September 2008. The album was recorded in 2008 at Electric Lady Studios in New York City. It features live recordings in addition to commentary and anecdotes from the duo.

== Track listing ==
All tracks written and composed by Alison Goldfrapp and Will Gregory, except where noted.

1. "iTunes Original"
2. "It Was the First Song Will and I Wrote Together"
3. "Lovely Head" (Goldfrapp, Gregory, Locke, Norfolk)
4. "It's Quite an Unusual Song"
5. "Paper Bag" (iTunes Originals version)
6. "It Was Recorded Outdoors"
7. "Deer Stop"
8. "We Like the Slow-y's"
9. "Black Cherry"
10. "I Never Get Tired of Doing It"
11. "Strict Machine" (iTunes Originals version) (Goldfrapp, Gregory, Nick Batt)
12. "Its Got a Certain Quality About It"
13. "Forever"
14. "It's Another One We Really Like Playing Live"
15. "You Never Know" (iTunes Originals version)
16. "We Did It at the End of the Album"
17. "Satin Chic"
18. "This Version Is Very Different"
19. "Ooh La La" (iTunes Originals version)
20. "It Was a Message to Me Really"
21. "Eat Yourself" (iTunes Originals version)
22. "Sentiment of the Song Is This Idea of Travelling"
23. "Road to Somewhere" (iTunes Originals version)
24. "I Was Inspired by a Friend of Mine Who Lives in Spain"
25. "Little Bird" (iTunes Originals version)
