= Live Sessions =

Live Sessions may refer to:

- Live Sessions (Bonobo EP), 2005
- Live Sessions (Matt Hires EP), 2011
- Live Sessions EP (Dami Im EP), 2019
- Live Sessions, an EP by Ju-Taun, 2018
- Live Sessions, an EP by Oh Land, 2011
- The Live Sessions EP, by the Exit, 2006

== See also ==
- Live Session (disambiguation)
