= Tales of Us =

Studio album by Goldfrapp
- Released: 6 September 2013
- Recorded: 2011–2013
- Studios: Angel Recording (London); Home studio (Wiltshire)
- Genre: Folktronica
- Length: 44:42
- Label: Mute
- Producers: Alison Goldfrapp; Will Gregory

Goldfrapp chronology
The Singles (2012)	Tales of Us (2013)	Silver Eye (2017)

Goldfrapp studio album chronology
Head First (2010)	Tales of Us (2013)	Silver Eye (2017)

Singles from Tales of Us
- 1. "Drew"; 2. "Annabel"; 3. "Thea" Released: 24 March 2014

Tales of Us is the sixth studio album by English electronic music duo Goldfrapp, released on 6 September 2013 by Mute Records. In June 2013, the duo embarked on the Tales of Us Tour to promote the album.

== Background and release ==
Goldfrapp began recording their sixth studio album in April 2011, recording in the English countryside, then mixing in London. A re-launch of the band's official website was synchronised with the announcement, which featured a video trailer directed by Lisa Gunning. The duo debuted songs from Tales of Us at the Manchester International Festival on 17 and 18 July 2013.

The track "Drew" premiered on 15 July 2013 on Lauren Laverne's BBC Radio 6 Music morning show. On the same day, the full Lisa Gunning-directed "Drew" music video was uploaded to the duo's website and to YouTube. "Thea" was released on 24 March 2014 as the first official single from the album.

On 20 January 2014, Goldfrapp announced a one-off screening of their thirty-minute film anthology Tales of Us, which was shown by Arts Alliance Media in select theatres across the UK, Europe, North America, Australia and New Zealand on the evening of 4 March. Co-created by Alison Goldfrapp and Gunning, the film follows five characters—Stranger, Laurel, Jo, Drew and Annabel—and spans themes of love, loss, madness and identity. The film was followed immediately by an exclusive live performance by Goldfrapp transmitted into cinemas from AIR Studios in London.

The song "Annabel" was inspired by Kathleen Winter's 2010 novel of the same name, about an intersex child being raised as a boy. Gunning, who directed the video for the song, optioned feature-film rights to the novel in 2014. "Clay" is based on a letter written by World War II veteran Brian Keith to his lover, another soldier known as "Dave".

== Critical reception ==
Professional ratings
Aggregate scores
Source	Rating
AnyDecentMusic?	7.4/10
Metacritic	75/100
Review scores
Source	Rating
AllMusic	4.5/5 stars
Clash	7/10
The Guardian	3/5 stars
The Independent	4/5 stars
Mojo	4/5 stars
MusicOMH	4.5/5 stars
NME	5/10
Pitchfork	6.1/10
PopMatters	7/10
Slant Magazine	3.5/5 stars

Tales of Us received generally positive reviews from music critics. At Metacritic, which assigns a weighted mean rating out of 100 to reviews from mainstream critics, the album received an average score of 75, based on 26 reviews. AllMusic wrote that although "Tales of Us isn't as immediate as, say, Supernature", it is "Goldfrapp's most sophisticated work to date, and one of their most consistently satisfying albums." Jordan Mainzer of musicOMH viewed the album's aesthetic as "striking" and "noticeably starker than anything [Goldfrapp have] made before", concluding, "This is real music, about real people, dealing in real emotion. That it sounds so gorgeously lush too is mere icing on a very rich cake." Andy Gill of The Independent stated, "The delicate guitar and piano figures and the sombre languor of strings behind Alison Goldfrapp's breathy vocals create something akin to a cross between the dreamlike mythopoeism of old folk tales and the lush cinematic arrangements of Michel Legrand."

Mojo critic David Hutcheon opined that compared to Felt Mountain and Seventh Tree, "the mood [on Tales of Us] is all of a piece, the songs are stronger, and nobody suggests lightening the atmosphere with a high-energy single to reassure listeners that Alison hasn't taken leave of her senses." Slant Magazine's Blue Sullivan praised the vocals as "simultaneously gorgeous and terrifying" and dubbed the album "a vital change of pace for Alison Goldfrapp, who's made a brilliant career of being the siren of lost souls." Ryan Lathan of PopMatters noted that "Alison has rarely sounded this captivating and the album contains some of the loveliest vocal performances she's recorded thus far." Lathan continued, "Goldfrapp have seemingly rekindled their creative fires and the result is a challenging and devastatingly beautiful record."

Will Salmon of Clash called the album a "frequently beautiful return to form" and commented that "Tales of Us is relentlessly one note but frequently beautiful, and a welcome change from the theatrics of its immediate predecessor, 2010's Head First" In a more mixed review, Pitchfork Media's Andrew Ryce felt that "some of the duo's unique imagination is replaced with a traditionalism that feels incongruous with the rest of their career", adding that "[d]iehard fans of Goldfrapp will no doubt find something to love here, but for the rest of us, it's a thin record that doesn't do much to prop up its skeletal frame." The Guardian's Dave Simpson argued that "the tunes don't all carry the album's single pace. As a result, Tales of Us is slightly more mesmerising soundscape than collection of genuinely outstanding songs." Jeremy Allen of the NME was negative in his review, panning the album as "samey and indulgent". Consequence of Sound said that the album was Goldfrapp's "most intimate and lavish recording to date", and that it moved away from previous electronic/disco stylings to form "a complex mesh between trip-hop and lounge."

== Commercial performance ==
Tales of Us debuted at number four on the UK Albums Chart with first-week sales of 13,817 copies, earning Goldfrapp their fourth consecutive top ten studio album. The album fell to number nineteen the following week, selling 4,484 units. Internationally, Tales of Us reached the top ten in Belgium, Germany and Switzerland, and the top twenty in Australia, Ireland, Netherlands, Norway and Portugal.

== Track listing ==
All tracks are written by Alison Goldfrapp and Will Gregory.

No.	Title	Length
1.	"Jo"	4:38
2.	"Annabel"	4:01
3.	"Drew"	4:46
4.	"Ulla"	3:49
5.	"Alvar"	5:37
6.	"Thea"	4:50
7.	"Simone"	4:18
8.	"Stranger"	4:12
9.	"Laurel"	4:10
10.	"Clay"	4:20
Total length:		44:42

Deluxe box set bonus CD
No.	Title	Length
1.	"Lee"	3:37
2.	"Stranger" (Moog Remix)	4:04
3.	"Thea" (Alternative) (featuring Sa Dingding)	4:48
4.	"Jo" (live in Manchester)	5:16
5.	"Drew" (live in Manchester)	5:05
6.	"Alvar" (live in Manchester)	6:28
7.	"Nowhere Boy" (soundtrack extract)	9:15

Deluxe box set bonus DVD
No.	Title	Length
1.	"Tales of Us in 5.1 surround sound, DTS and Dolby Digital"
2.	"The Making of Tales of Us" (documentary)
3.	"Drew" (film)
4.	"Annabel" (film)

Digital deluxe edition bonus tracks
No.	Title	Length
1.	"Paper Bag" (live from Air Studios)	4:26
2.	"Utopia" (live from Air Studios)	4:11
3.	"Clowns" (live from Air Studios)	4:08
4.	"Clay" (live from Air Studios)	4:20
5.	"Alvar" (live from Air Studios)	5:55
6.	"Little Bird" (live from Air Studios)	7:20
7.	"Lovely Head" (live from Air Studios)	5:10
8.	"Train" (live from Air Studios)	4:13
9.	"Thea" (live from Air Studios)	4:43
10.	"Strict Machine" (live from Air Studios)	5:14
11.	"Stranger" (short film) (iTunes Store and Amazon MP3 US only)	5:56
12.	"Laurel" (short film) (iTunes Store and Amazon MP3 US only)	4:45
13.	"Jo" (short film) (iTunes Store only and Amazon MP3 US)	5:20
14.	"Drew" (short film) (iTunes Store only and Amazon MP3 US)	4:58
15.	"Annabel" (short film) (iTunes Store only)	6:56

Box set also contains:

- Vinyl album pressed on 180 gm vinyl in a gatefold sleeve with 24" poster
- 40-page, large-format hardback book compiled by Alison with exclusive images from Tales of Us
- 12" lithographic art print
- Numbered certificate of authenticity

== Personnel ==
Credits adapted from the liner notes of Tales of Us.

=== Goldfrapp ===
- Alison Goldfrapp – vocals, instruments
- Will Gregory – string arrangements, instruments

=== Additional musicians ===
- Steve Evans – additional programming (tracks 3, 6, 7, 10); acoustic guitar (tracks 3, 8–10)
- Aidan Love – additional programming (track 7)
- Nick Ingman – string scoring, string conducting
- Charlie Jones – double bass (tracks 1, 5)
- Alex Lee – bass guitar (track 2); acoustic guitar (tracks 3, 5, 9, 10); electric guitar, Nashville guitar (track 5)
- Martyn Barker – drums (track 3)
- John Parish – drums (tracks 3, 7)
- John Parricelli – guitar (track 4)
- Ian Burdge – cello (track 4)
- John Metcalfe – viola (track 4)
- Louisa Fuller – violin (track 4)
- Martyn Barker – Indian guitar (track 5); drums (tracks 5, 9, 10)
- Paul Cowgill – horse effects (track 6)
- Ross Hughes – acoustic guitar, cavaquinho (track 7)
- Chris Laurence – double bass (track 8)
- String section (tracks 1–3, 7–10)
  - Everton Nelson, Steve Morris, Emlyn Singleton, Warren Zielinski, Rita Manning, Richard George, Ian Humphries, Patrick Kiernan, Ann Morfee, Debbie Widdup, Kathy Shave, Dave Williams, Rusty Pomeroy, Boguslaw Kostecki, Tom Pigott-Smith, Mark Berrow – violin
  - Peter Lale, Bill Hawkes, Bruce White, Andy Parker, Nick Barr, Morgan Goff – viola
  - Ian Burdge, Sophie Harris, Nick Cooper, Penny Driver, Chris Allan – cello
  - Chris Laurence, Richard Pryce, Stacey Watton – double bass (tracks 1–3, 7–10)

=== Technical ===
- Alison Goldfrapp – production
- Will Gregory – production
- Greg Freeman – additional engineering (tracks 1, 3–5, 10)
- Eduardo de la Paz – additional engineering (track 7); mixing assistance (all tracks)
- Craig Silvey – mixing
- Gary Thomas – string recording
- John Dent – mastering

=== Artwork ===
- Alison Goldfrapp – artwork direction
- Mat Maitland – artwork direction
- Annemarieke van Drimmelen – photography
- Julie Rubio – image treatments
- Lenka Rayn H. – additional photography

== Charts ==
=== Weekly charts ===
Chart (2013)	Peak position
Australian Albums (ARIA)	15
Austrian Albums (Ö3 Austria)	24
Belgian Albums (Ultratop Flanders)	6
Belgian Albums (Ultratop Wallonia)	14
Czech Albums (ČNS IFPI)	42
Danish Albums (Hitlisten)	23
Dutch Albums (Album Top 100)	16
Finnish Albums (Suomen virallinen lista)	32
French Albums (SNEP)	33
German Albums (Offizielle Top 100)	9
Irish Albums (IRMA)	15
Irish Independent Albums (IRMA)	4
Italian Albums (FIMI)	38
Norwegian Albums (VG-lista)	19
Portuguese Albums (AFP)	14
Scottish Albums (Official Charts)	5
Spanish Albums (Promusicae)	47
Swiss Albums (Schweizer Hitparade)	8
UK Albums (Official Charts)	4
UK Independent Albums (Official Charts)	3
US Billboard 200	75
US Independent Albums (Billboard)	16
US Top Alternative Albums (Billboard)	16

=== Year-end charts ===
Chart (2013)	Position
Belgian Albums (Ultratop Flanders)	164

== Certifications ==
Region	Certification	Certified units/sales
United Kingdom (BPI)	Silver	60,000^{‡}
^{‡} Sales+streaming figures based on certification alone.

== Release history ==
Region	Date	Format(s)	Edition	Label	Ref.
Australia	6 September 2013	CD; digital download	Standard	Mute	
Germany	6 September 2013	CD; LP+CD; digital download	Standard	Mute	
Ireland	6 September 2013	CD; digital download	Standard	Mute	
Netherlands	6 September 2013	CD; LP+CD	Standard	Mute	
France	9 September 2013	CD; LP+CD; digital download	Standard	Mute	
Italy	9 September 2013	CD; LP+CD; digital download	Standard	Mute	
Netherlands	9 September 2013	Digital download	Standard	Mute	
Sweden	9 September 2013	Digital download	Standard	Mute	
United Kingdom	9 September 2013	CD; LP+CD; digital download	Standard	Mute	
United States	10 September 2013	CD; LP+CD; digital download	Standard	Mute	
Sweden	11 September 2013	CD	Standard	Mute	
United Kingdom	2 December 2013	CD+DVD+LP box set	Deluxe	Mute	
Japan	4 December 2013	CD; digital download	Standard	Mute; Traffic	
Germany	27 June 2014	Digital download	Deluxe	Mute	
Ireland	27 June 2014	Digital download	Deluxe	Mute	
France	30 June 2014	Digital download	Deluxe	Mute	
United Kingdom	30 June 2014	Digital download	Deluxe	Mute	
United States	8 July 2014	Digital download	Deluxe	Mute	
