= Believer (Goldfrapp song) =

2010 single by Goldfrapp

Single by Goldfrapp

from the album Head First
- Released: 6 September 2010
- Genre: Synth-pop; new wave
- Length: 3:43
- Label: Mute
- Songwriter(s): Alison Goldfrapp; Will Gregory
- Producer(s): Alison Goldfrapp; Will Gregory

Goldfrapp singles chronology
| "Alive" (2010) | "Believer" (2010) | "Thea" (2014) |

"Believer" is a song by English electronic music duo Goldfrapp from their fifth studio album, Head First (2010). The song was written and produced by Alison Goldfrapp and Will Gregory, with additional production by Pascal Gabriel. It was released on 6 September 2010 as the album's third and final single.

== Release ==
The single was confirmed in July 2010 in an email to fans, where it was also confirmed that Vince Clarke and Davide Rossi would remix the single, among others. Goldfrapp performed the song on Alan Carr: Chatty Man on 22 August 2010.

== Critical reception ==
"Believer" received positive reviews from critics. In a review for Slant Magazine, Sal Cinquemani described the song as "a bit of new wave-inflected computer pop (think B-52s meets Erasure) that finds Alison's faith in Cupid restored." Ian Wade of BBC Music stated that "the stupendous 'Believer', with its stadium-sized chorus, appears like a turbo-charged Fleetwood Mac." Heather Phares of AllMusic commented that the song "sounds instantly familiar, but not tired or obvious", and Digital Spy reviewer Nick Levine wrote that "the synths on 'Believer' bounce along like vintage Erasure." The Independent's Andy Gill opined that the song, "with its childlike lyric [...] set to a basic Eighties' synth riff, is exactly in step with retro-electropop fashion."

== Music video ==
The music video for "Believer" was directed by Lisa Gunning and consists of live footage from the Head First World Tour. It premiered on YouTube on 11 August 2010.

== Track listing ==
- Digital single
1. "Believer" – 3:44
2. "Believer" (Joris Voorn Remix) – 5:46
3. "Believer" (Joris Voorn Dub) – 7:11
4. "Believer" (Vince Clarke Remix) – 5:42
5. "Believer" (Vince Clarke Remix Edit) – 3:56
6. "Believer" (Little Loud Remix) – 4:11
7. "Believer" (Subway Remix) – 5:40
8. "Believer" (Davide Rossi Reinterpretation) – 3:59
- CD single
1. "Believer" (Album Version) – 3:43
2. "Believer" (Joris Voorn Remix) – 5:47
3. "Believer" (Vince Clarke Remix) – 5:42
4. "Believer" (Subway Remix) – 5:41
5. "Believer" (Davide Rossi Reinterpretation) – 3:59

== Credits and personnel ==
Credits adapted from the liner notes of Head First.

=== Recording ===
- Mixed at The Mix Suite UK (London)
- Mastered at Sterling Sound (New York City)

=== Personnel ===
- Alison Goldfrapp – vocals, recording, production
- Will Gregory – recording, production
- Mark "Spike" Stent – mixing
- Matty Green – mixing assistance
- Pascal Gabriel – additional production
- Bruno Ellingham – additional engineering
- Ted Jensen – mastering

== Charts ==
Chart performance for "Believer"
| Chart (2010) | Peak position |
|---|---|
| UK Singles (OCC) | 180 |
| US Dance Club Songs (Billboard) | 31 |
| US Dance Singles Sales (Billboard) | 6 |
| US Hot Singles Sales (Billboard) | 31 |
