= Live Recordings =

Live Recordings may refer to:

- Bootleg recordings made without authorization
- Live Recordings 2004, an album by Keane
- Live Recordings (Majida El Rouni album)
- Soundboard recordings made from a direct connection to the live-sound reinforcement system

== See also ==
- Live album
