= Head First (Goldfrapp album) =

2010 studio album by Goldfrapp

Studio album by Goldfrapp
- Released: 19 March 2010
- Recorded: July–December 2009 in Bath and London
- Genre: Electropop; synth-pop; Italo disco
- Length: 38:08
- Label: Mute
- Producer: Alison Goldfrapp; Will Gregory

Goldfrapp chronology
iTunes Originals: Goldfrapp (2008)	Head First (2010)	The Singles (2012)

Singles from Head First
- 1. "Rocket" Released: 5 March 2010; 2. "Alive" Released: 7 June 2010; 3. "Believer" Released: 6 September 2010

Head First is the fifth studio album by English electronic music duo Goldfrapp, released 19 March 2010 by Mute Records. The album debuted at number six on the UK Albums Chart, selling 23,261 copies in its first week. It was supported by three singles: "Rocket", "Alive" and "Believer". Head First received a nomination for Best Electronic/Dance Album at the 53rd Annual Grammy Awards.

== Background and development ==
"I think we just wanted something really simple and that had a sort of euphoric-ness to it. A kind of slightly surreal but dreamy quality—pink clouds and [the feeling that] you can carry on forever. A sort of slight fantasy feeling."

— Alison Goldfrapp discussing the album artwork for Head First.

In July 2009, Goldfrapp announced that they had begun recording their fifth studio album, with recording sessions taking place in Bath and London. A photoshoot for the album took place in November 2009. The duo hoped to have the album completed by December 2009. A press release issued ahead of the release described Head First as their "most powerful trip to date, a speedy rush of synth optimism, euphoria, fantasy and romance. With life affirming lyrics and stellar production it lifts off at full tilt and takes us on a journey to the heart of 2010."

Alison Goldfrapp explained that the upbeat nature of the album was inspired by her desire to create something "a little bit like Supernature, but that had a warmer sound—maybe not as hard." Describing their previous album Seventh Tree as an "intimate, dreamy, more introspective album" which was created in response to deep unhappiness with her personal life following the tiring Supernature tour, Head First was a reaction to wanting "to get out the synths again, put your hands in the air" and "set about making an 'up' album."

In the following years, after re-signing to Mute following its split from parent label EMI, Goldfrapp expressed dissatisfaction with the recording process and final composition of the album. Will Gregory described a "schedule" provided by EMI which they felt "blackmailed into sticking to", despite needing "another six months on Head First really." This rushed process was something which they specifically aimed to address when recording their next album Tales of Us. In terms of the artistic direction for Head First, Goldfrapp described the process as "very nasty"; EMI had pressured them to create a more commercial sound which was at odds with their plans for the record and their image.

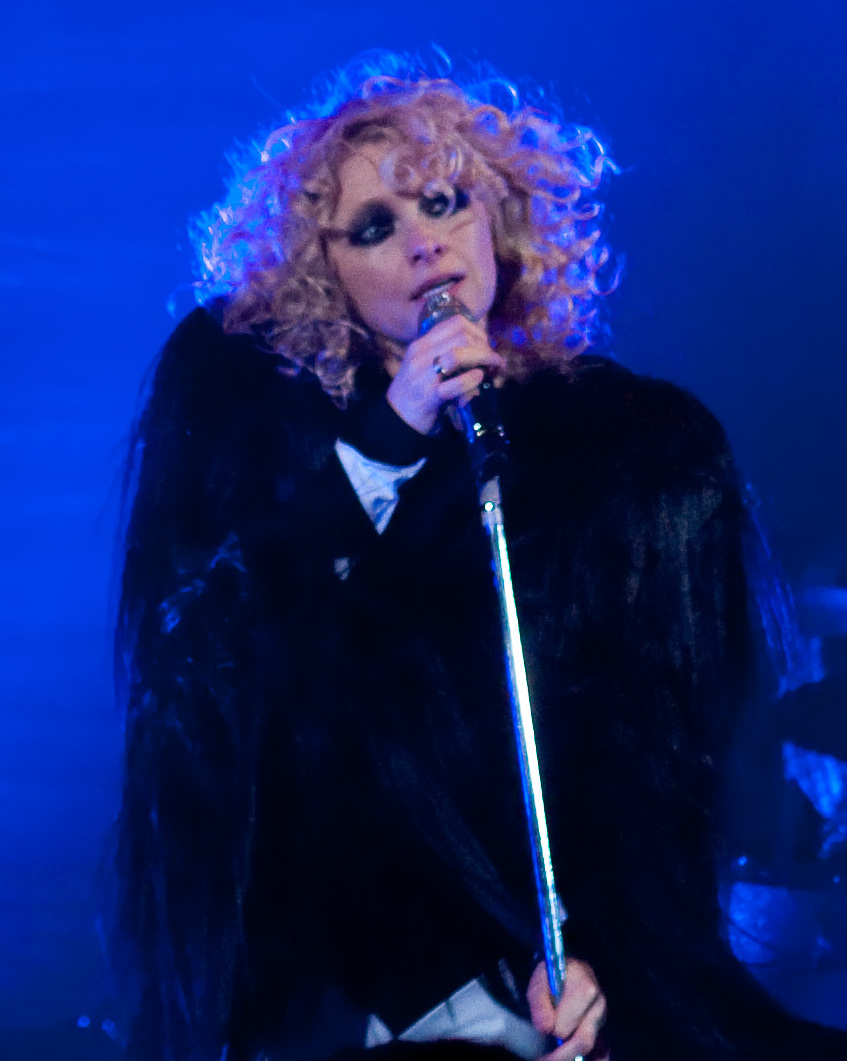
Goldfrapp performing in November 2010

Overall, Goldfrapp expressed "not [feeling] very proud" and "not [being] crazy about" the album, describing it as too "on the nose". While singling out affection for "Voicething" and "Shiny and Warm" and admitting that there were "some good tunes on there", she felt as though they "should have given them to someone else instead of us releasing them as Goldfrapp." In discussing re-signing with Mute after its separation from EMI, Goldfrapp expressed pleasure in their independence "and a new management who are on our side, they're not trying to make a quick buck" and that "it did feel like a new start... 'we're going to do what we want to do'."

== Critical reception ==
Professional ratings
Aggregate scores
Source	Rating
AnyDecentMusic?	6.3/10
Metacritic	68/100
Review scores
Source	Rating
AllMusic	4/5 stars
Entertainment Weekly	B
The Guardian	3/5 stars
The Independent	3/5 stars
NME	6/10
Pitchfork	6.6/10
Rolling Stone	2.5/5 stars
Slant Magazine	4/5 stars
Spin	8/10
The Times	3/5 stars

Head First received generally positive reviews from music critics. At Metacritic, which assigns a normalised rating out of 100 to reviews from mainstream publications, the album received an average score of 68, based on 22 reviews. Heather Phares of AllMusic stated that the album "proves that Goldfrapp's skill at adopting and fully embodying different styles is what makes them distinctive, not necessarily one signature sound", while noting the influence of Giorgio Moroder, ABBA and Xanadu-era Olivia Newton-John. Leah Greenblatt of Entertainment Weekly wrote that "Head First sounds as if [Goldfrapp have] been commissioned to paint the inside of Olivia Newton-John's mind, circa 1980: all strobe-lit synths, feathery vocals, and goofy synonyms for sex." Ian Wade of BBC Music raved, "Free of anything in the slightest bit terrible, Head First is amazing stuff." At Spin, Lindsey Thomas commented that "Will Gregory creates a pitch-perfect neon-lit '80s wonderland with Hi-NRG bass lines and plenty of that fat synth sound made famous by Van Halen's 'Jump.'"

Sal Cinquemani of Slant Magazine opined that "Head First is a brief trip, but it's saturated with enough hi-NRG motifs and sounds for countless sweaty workouts at Jack LaLanne." In a mixed review, Alexis Petridis of The Guardian noted that "Head First returns Goldfrapp to commercial waters—this time the glossy, optimistic 1980s pop that provides the playlist backbone of Magic FM", but found that "there are instances when the songwriting isn't that exciting, when the choruses don't ascend quite as stratospherically as they're supposed to, and you're left listening to what is, in essence, an MOR pop album." Rolling Stone's Will Hermes expressed that Head First "may be the most lovingly detailed synth-pop album since the golden days of Yaz and Kim Carnes. Yet expert execution doesn't always signal a good idea." Peter Paphides of The Times wrote, "The best moments on [...] Head First—'Believer' and the title track—also double as its uncoolest ones." Marc Hogan from Pitchfork remarked, "Bringing 1980s roller-disco synth-pop motifs out of mothballs has given the UK duo their most immediately entertaining album since 2005 electro-glam juggernaut Supernature", but felt that the duo "fail to give each song a face as memorable as the overall album's Jane Fonda workout-video get-up."

The album also received criticism for following the musical directions of artists that are said to have been influenced by Goldfrapp. Andy Gill of The Independent observed that "Goldfrapp now suddenly effect a complete volte-face on Head First, heading back to the electronic pop of their three previous releases", which is "a curious, circuitous trajectory which gives the impression that Goldfrapp are in the invidious position of playing catch-up to all the Gagas, LaRouxs [sic] and Little Boots upon whom they must surely have been a major influence." Barry Nicolson of NME commented, "Once the source of pop inspiration, now it seems they're content to follow", concluding that the album is "basically an upbeat electro-pop record with one foot in the '80s, much like roughly 85 per cent of music made in the last two years." Kitty Empire of The Observer agreed, stating, "Having pre-empted the wave of womanly electro, they appear now to be behind rather than ahead of the curve", while calling the album "decent but unsurprising".

== Commercial performance ==
Head First debuted at number six on the UK Albums Chart with 23,261 copies sold in its first week, earning Goldfrapp their third consecutive top-10 album. The album had sold 70,000 copies in the United Kingdom by December 2010, and on 22 July 2013, it was certified silver by the British Phonographic Industry (BPI). In the United States, Head First debuted at number 45 on the Billboard 200 with first-week sales of 10,000 copies, becoming the duo's highest-peaking album on the chart. As of June 2013, the album had sold 39,000 copies in the United States.

== Track listing ==
All tracks are written by Alison Goldfrapp and Will Gregory.

Head First track listing
No.	Title	Length
1.	"Rocket"	3:51
2.	"Believer"	3:43
3.	"Alive"	3:28
4.	"Dreaming"	5:07
5.	"Head First"	4:30
6.	"Hunt"	4:34
7.	"Shiny and Warm"	3:58
8.	"I Wanna Life"	4:13
9.	"Voicething"	4:44
Total length:		38:08

== Personnel ==
=== Goldfrapp ===
- Alison Goldfrapp
- Will Gregory

=== Additional musicians ===
- Tim Goldsworthy – drum arrangement (track 7); additional programming (tracks 1, 3, 6)
- Nick Batt – additional programming (tracks 1, 3, 8)
- Alex Lee – guitar (tracks 1, 3, 5)
- Charlie Jones – bass (tracks 1, 3, 4, 8)
- Chris Goulston – guitar (track 3)
- Davide Rossi – violin (tracks 1, 4)
- Ged Lynch – drums (tracks 1, 3, 8)

=== Technical ===
- Alison Goldfrapp – recording, production
- Will Gregory – recording, production
- Mark "Spike" Stent – mixing
- Matty Green – mixing assistance (track 1–5, 7–9)
- Neil Comber – mixing assistance (track 6)
- Pascal Gabriel – additional production (tracks 1, 2, 4, 5, 8)
- Richard X – additional production (track 3)
- Tim Goldsworthy – drum recording (track 7)
- Greg Freeman – drum recording (tracks 1, 3, 8)
- Bruno Ellingham – additional engineering
- Ted Jensen – mastering

=== Artwork ===
- Alison Goldfrapp – art direction
- Mat Maitland – art direction, images
- Serge Leblon – images

== Charts ==
=== Weekly charts ===
Weekly chart performance for Head First
Chart (2010)	Peak position
Australian Albums (ARIA)	14
Australian Dance Albums (ARIA)	3
Austrian Albums (Ö3 Austria)	33
Belgian Albums (Ultratop Flanders)	35
Belgian Albums (Ultratop Wallonia)	49
Canadian Albums (Nielsen SoundScan)	33
Dutch Albums (Album Top 100)	47
European Albums (Billboard)	10
French Albums (SNEP)	70
German Albums (Offizielle Top 100)	28
Greek International Albums (IFPI)	4
Irish Albums (IRMA)	17
Italian Albums (FIMI)	27
Mexican Albums (Top 100 Mexico)	95
New Zealand Albums (RMNZ)	18
Norwegian Albums (VG-lista)	19
Polish Albums (ZPAV)	28
Scottish Albums (OCC)	7
Spanish Albums (Promusicae)	47
Swedish Albums (Sverigetopplistan)	49
Swiss Albums (Schweizer Hitparade)	14
UK Albums (OCC)	6
US Billboard 200	45
US Independent Albums (Billboard)	4
US Top Alternative Albums (Billboard)	6
US Top Dance Albums (Billboard)	3

=== Year-end charts ===
Year-end chart performance for Head First
Chart (2010)	Position
Australian Dance Albums (ARIA)	50
UK Albums (OCC)	189

== Certifications ==
Certifications for Head First
Region	Certification	Certified units/sales
United Kingdom (BPI)	Silver	70,000

== Release history ==
Release dates and formats for Head First
Region	Date	Format	Label	Ref(s)
Australia	19 March 2010	CD; digital download	EMI	
Germany	19 March 2010	CD; digital download	EMI	
Ireland	19 March 2010	CD; digital download	Mute	
Italy	19 March 2010	CD; digital download	EMI	
Netherlands	19 March 2010	CD; digital download	EMI	
France	22 March 2010	Digital download	EMI	
Sweden	22 March 2010	Digital download	EMI	
United Kingdom	22 March 2010	CD; LP + CD; digital download	Mute	
United States	23 March 2010	CD; digital download	Mute	
Sweden	24 March 2010	CD	EMI	
France	28 March 2010	CD	EMI	
United States	12 April 2010	LP + CD	Mute	
United Kingdom	17 April 2010	Cassette (Note: Limited-edition release for Record Store Day)	Mute	
