= Alive (Goldfrapp song) =

2010 single by Goldfrapp

Single by Goldfrapp

from the album Head First
- Released: 7 June 2010
- Genre: Synth-pop
- Length: 3:28
- Label: Mute
- Songwriter(s): Alison Goldfrapp; Will Gregory
- Producer(s): Alison Goldfrapp; Will Gregory

Goldfrapp singles chronology
"Rocket" (2010)	"Alive" (2010)	"Believer" (2010)

"Alive" is a song by English electronic music duo Goldfrapp from their fifth studio album, Head First (2010). It was written and produced by Alison Goldfrapp and Will Gregory, with additional production by Richard X. The song was released on 7 June 2010 as the album's second single. The single failed to chart on the UK Singles Chart, while becoming Goldfrapp's fifth single to top the Hot Dance Club Songs chart in the United States.

== Critical reception ==
"Alive" received positive reviews from music critics. Robert Copsey of Digital Spy stated, "Beginning with a piano riff reminiscent of vintage Elton, 'Alive' builds towards a fantastic arms-in-the-air chorus on which Goldfrapp proclaims 'I'm feeling alive again' over gorgeously warm 80s-style synths." Heather Phares of AllMusic wrote that the song "channels ABBA with percolating guitars, warm keyboards and synths that sparkle like falling stars or a shower of glitter." Peter Paphides of The Times referred to "Alive" as Billy Joel's 1980 song "It's Still Rock and Roll to Me" as if "marinaded in amyl nitrate and recast to lyrics that sound like a great lost Brutus jeans jingle."

BBC Music reviewer Ian Wade felt that "while 'Alive' initially echoes The Feeling, it soon expands into a broader wonder evocative of ELO's most-imperial phase." Barry Nicolson of NME noted that the track "treads along on an infuriatingly familiar-sounding piano hook modernised by Gregory's whip-smart production." Andy Gill of The Independent opined that "the Elton-esque piano chords of 'Alive' [...] recall the indulgent, bogus innocence of 1970s AOR pop excess with Spandex-tight accuracy." Spin magazine's Lindsey Thomas commented that the song "wears its influences proudly, flaunting the shimmery squiggles that denoted muse-y magic in Xanadu."

== Music video ==
=== Development ===
Impressed by their work on the music video for Florence and the Machine's song "Dog Days Are Over", Alison asked the direction duo Legs to produce a script for the song "Alive". Legs decided to create a dark video featured in a demonic world because "Alive" is "so infectiously happy and bright." The video was inspired by heavy metal bands and the music video for Olivia Newton-John's song "Physical".

A female vampire sucking the rainbow-coloured blood from one of the male black metal dancers

The video was filmed over one day. The morning was dedicated to filming the dancers and extras, while the afternoon focused on Goldfrapp's stage performance. Ross McLennan, the director of photography, experimented with different styles of lighting to give the video an "incredible energy." Special effects such as laser beams, blood and fang transformation were added in post-production by Absolute Post in New York City.

=== Concept ===
The main idea behind the video is that Alison is a 1980s-inspired aerobics instructor who leads a group of black metal fans and vampires through a fitness routine. The video begins with Alison standing in a dark room with smoke rising around her. In front of her are a group of men (the black metal fans) standing in a pentagram wearing black hooded capes. As the music begins to pick up, the men take off their capes and begin to dance.

After the chorus, Alison shoots white laser beams from her fingertips, summoning a group of female dancers to join the dancing group of goth men. As the video progresses, Alison uses further power to make the female dancers, who are actually vampires, attack the dancing metalheads and consume their rainbow-coloured blood. Throughout this, Alison continues to sing and dance, urging the vampires to continue to perform the aerobics routine. The video ends with Alison drinking some of the blood, revealing a pair of vampire fangs and laying down in a neon coffin.

== Track listings ==
- Digital single
1. "Alive" – 3:28
2. "Alive" (Joakim Remix) – 6:31
3. "Alive" (Joakim NRG Dub) – 6:14
4. "Alive" (Tensnake Remix) – 7:23
5. "Alive" (Dave Audé Remix) – 7:57
6. "Alive" (Arno Cost Remix) – 8:24
- UK limited-edition shaped 7-inch picture disc

A. "Alive" (Radio Edit) – 3:00
B. "Alive" (Joakim Remix Edit) – 3:55

== Credits and personnel ==
Credits adapted from the liner notes of Head First.

=== Recording ===
- Mixed at The Mix Suite UK (London)
- Mastered at Sterling Sound (New York City)

=== Personnel ===
- Alison Goldfrapp – vocals, recording, production
- Will Gregory – recording, production
- Mark "Spike" Stent – mixing
- Matty Green – mixing assistance
- Richard X – additional production
- Tim Goldsworthy – additional programming
- Greg Freeman – drum recording
- Nick Batt – additional programming
- Bruno Ellingham – additional engineering
- Ted Jensen – mastering
- Alex Lee – guitar
- Charlie Jones – bass
- Chris Goulston – guitar
- Ged Lynch – drums

== Charts ==
=== Weekly charts ===
Weekly chart performance for "Alive"
Chart (2010)	Peak position
Global Dance Songs (Billboard)	22
US Dance Club Songs (Billboard)	1
US Dance Singles Sales (Billboard)	7
US Hot Singles Sales (Billboard)	25

=== Year-end charts ===
Year-end chart performance for "Alive"
Chart (2010)	Position
US Dance Club Songs (Billboard)	20
