= Rocket (Goldfrapp song) =

2010 single by Goldfrapp

Single by Goldfrapp

from the album Head First
- Released: 8 March 2010
- Genre: Dance-pop; electropop; power pop; post-disco
- Length: 3:51
- Label: Mute
- Songwriter(s): Alison Goldfrapp; Will Gregory
- Producer(s): Alison Goldfrapp; Will Gregory

Goldfrapp singles chronology
"Clowns" (2008)	"Rocket" (2010)	"Alive" (2010)

"Rocket" is a song by English electronic music duo Goldfrapp from their fifth studio album, Head First (2010). It was written and produced by Alison Goldfrapp and Will Gregory, with additional production by Pascal Gabriel. The song was released on 8 March 2010 as the album's lead single. To promote the single, the duo performed the song on Friday Night with Jonathan Ross on 26 March 2010. The accompanying music video features Alison driving a truck hauling a rocket with someone entirely wrapped in duct tape who is then taped to the rocket when it is launched at the end.

The track was nominated for Best Dance Recording at the 2011 Grammy Awards, but lost to Rihanna's "Only Girl (In the World)".

== Critical reception ==
"Rocket" was met with positive reviews from music critics. Heather Phares of AllMusic said that the song's "driving minor-key verses and huge, shimmering choruses tap into the brain's pleasure center as efficiently as possible", dubbing it one of Goldfrapp's "most irresistible songs yet". Barry Nicolson of NME described it as "a sleek, synth-powered ballistic missile that's high on Pat Benatar's hairspray and in possession of a chorus so cheesy and ebullient." DJ Ron Slomowicz of About.com wrote that the track "represents the best of the 80's and Goldfrapp's take on glitzy power pop. The energy is palpable and so is the vitriol as there is no mistaking Alison's intent, despite the soaring and beautiful melodies." Pitchfork's Marc Hogan commented that "Rocket" "shows Head First at its best, but it's also a reminder of where some of the other songs fall short."

Several critics noted the song's heavy influence from 1980s music and culture, with both The Independent and The Times pointing out the similarity between the synths used for "Rocket" and those Van Halen used for their 1984 song "Jump". BBC Music's Ian Wade felt that the song "couldn't be more 80s if it arrived sweaty from a Jane Fonda workout, dressed in a neon legwarmers and a fashionably ripped Van Halen t-shirt. If it doesn't knock the top ten for six, that'll be a mystery for future generations to mull." Digital Spy music editor Nick Levine wrote that "'Rocket' finds [the duo] channelling early '80s radio pop—hands up who hears Van Halen?—while an empowered Alison gives her cheating ex the elbow." Alexis Petridis of The Guardian stated that the song "carries the influence of Olivia Newton-John and the Electric Light Orchestra's 'Xanadu'. The kind of euphoric we've-just-won-the-World-Cup synthesiser fanfares that power both Van Halen's 'Jump' and PhD's 'I Won't Let You Down' abound, there's the occasional hint of Tango in the Night-era Fleetwood Mac, and you're never that far from a conjunction of wobbling electronics and anthemic chorus that recalls Phil Oakey and Giorgio Moroder's 'Together in Electric Dreams'."

During an interview with music website Popjustice based on questions made by fans, Alison commented on the comparisons drawn between "Rocket" and "Jump" by saying: "I'm not very familiar with Van Halen as a band, I'm afraid, but I think we were definitely inspired by that sound. It's not exactly the same sound as the sound but it's definitely been inspired by it."

== Commercial performance ==
"Rocket" debuted and peaked at number 47 on the UK Singles Chart on 14 March 2010—the duo's first lead single not to debut within the UK top 40 since their 2000 debut single "Lovely Head"—falling to number 76 the following week. In its third week on the run, the same week its parent album Head First debuted in the top 10, the single made a 16-spot leap on the chart to number 60. In Ireland, "Rocket" debuted at number 40 on the Irish Singles Chart during the week of 11 March 2010, dropping off the chart the following week before making a re-entry at its peak position of number 36 the week after. The track also earned Goldfrapp their fourth chart-topper on the US Hot Dance Club Songs. Elsewhere, "Rocket" saw moderate success in Central Europe, peaking at number 19 in Hungary, number 30 in Slovakia, number 32 in Germany, number 38 in Austria and number 50 in Switzerland.

== Music video ==
The music video for "Rocket" was directed by Kim Gehrig and filmed in January 2010. The main idea behind the video is that Alison is a truck driver who wants to send an ex-boyfriend into outer space.

The video begins with Alison driving a transport truck through a desert. She is accompanied by a male in a full-body cast. As the chorus begins it is revealed that the truck is pulling a giant purple rocket. She stops the truck to dance in the desert and is joined by a group of females. Gregory makes a cameo appearance in the video as a petrol station attendant. The video concludes with Alison and the dancers taping the male passenger to the rocket and launching it into outer space by counting backwards from five.

== Track listing ==
- Digital single
1. "Rocket" – 3:52
2. "Rocket" (Tiësto Remix) – 6:54
3. "Rocket" (Richard X One Zero Remix) – 7:00
4. "Rocket" (Richard X Eight Four Remix) – 6:58
5. "Rocket" (Penguin Prison Remix) – 6:35
6. "Rocket" (Grum Remix) – 6:34
- CD single
1. "Rocket" – 3:51
2. "Rocket" (Tiësto Remix) – 6:53
3. "Rocket" (Richard X One Zero Remix) – 7:00
4. "Rocket" (Penguin Prison Remix) – 6:31
5. "Rocket" (Grum Remix) – 6:38

== Credits and personnel ==
Credits adapted from the liner notes of Head First.

=== Recording ===
- Mixed at The Mix Suite UK (London)
- Mastered at Sterling Sound (New York City)

=== Personnel ===
- Alison Goldfrapp – vocals, recording, production
- Will Gregory – recording, production
- Mark "Spike" Stent – mixing
- Matty Green – mixing assistance
- Pascal Gabriel – additional production
- Tim Goldsworthy – additional programming
- Greg Freeman – drum recording
- Nick Batt – additional programming
- Bruno Ellingham – additional engineering
- Ted Jensen – mastering
- Alex Lee – guitar
- Charlie Jones – bass
- Davide Rossi – violin
- Ged Lynch – drums

== Charts ==
=== Weekly charts ===
Weekly chart performance for "Rocket"
Chart (2010)	Peak position
Australia (ARIA)	55
Australia Dance (ARIA)	12
Austria (Ö3 Austria Top 40)	38
Belgium (Ultratip Bubbling Under Flanders)	19
Belgium (Ultratip Bubbling Under Wallonia)	9
European Hot 100 Singles (Billboard)	50
Germany (GfK)	32
Global Dance Songs (Billboard)	14
Hungary (Rádiós Top 40)	19
Iceland (RÚV)	6
Ireland (IRMA)	36
Italy (FIMI)	19
Italy Airplay (EarOne)	4
Japan (Japan Hot 100) (Billboard)	74
Poland (Dance Top 50)	46
Russia Airplay (Tophit)	195
Scotland (OCC)	52
Slovakia (Rádio Top 100)	30
South Korean International Singles (Gaon)	99
Switzerland (Schweizer Hitparade)	50
UK Singles (OCC)	47
US Dance Club Songs (Billboard)	1
US Dance Singles Sales (Billboard)	1
US Dance/Electronic Digital Songs (Billboard)	33
US Dance/Mix Show Airplay (Billboard)	21
US Hot Singles Sales (Billboard)	4

=== Year-end charts ===
Year-end chart performance for "Rocket"
Chart (2010)	Peak position
Italy Airplay (EarOne)	26
US Dance Club Songs (Billboard)	1
