= Alison Goldfrapp =

English musician and record producer (born 1966)

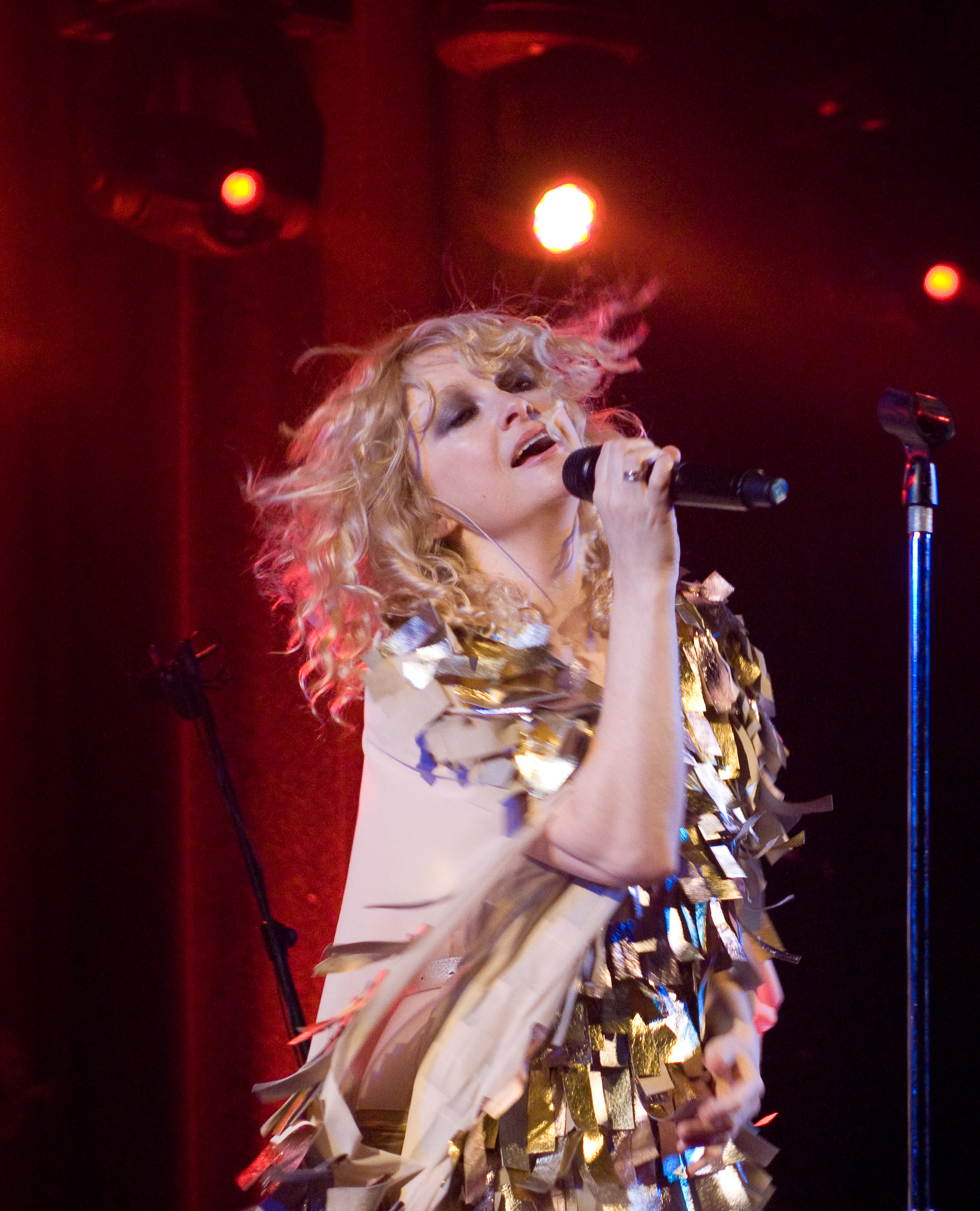
- Goldfrapp at a concert in Oxford in 2010

Background information
- Also known as: Goldfrapp
- Born: Alison Elizabeth Margaret Goldfrapp; 13 May 1966 (age 60); London, England
- Genres: Electronic; synth-pop; trip hop; ambient
- Occupations: Musician; singer; songwriter; record producer
- Instruments: Vocals; piano; tambourine; synthesiser; mandolin
- Years active: 1989–present
- Labels: Mute; BMG; Skint; A.G Records
- Member of: Goldfrapp
- Website: alisongoldfrapp.com

Alison Elizabeth Margaret Goldfrapp (born 13 May 1966) is an English musician and record producer, known as the founder, vocalist and namesake of English electronic music duo Goldfrapp.

== Early life and education ==
Alison Elizabeth Margaret Goldfrapp was born on the 13 May 1966, in Enfield, London, the youngest of six children. Her mother, Isabella Barge, was a nurse. Her father, Nicholas Goldfrapp, had been an army officer, and worked in advertising. Goldfrapp's surname is of German origin.

While Alison was growing up, her family moved frequently, eventually settling in Alton, Hampshire, where Alison attended the independent Alton Convent School. She sang in a choir at the school and has said that she loved being in a school with nuns. However, she was forced to leave at age 11 after failing the senior exam, and attended the local comprehensive school, Amery Hill School.

She moved into a squat in London aged 16, then lived in Belgium for a brief time. Four years later, she went to art school, where she started experimenting with music.

== Career ==
In 1994, she featured on the Orbital album Snivilisation and recorded songs "The Good" and "The Bad" with trip reggae outfit Dreadzone, for their "best of" album The Best of Dreadzone – The Good The Bad and the Dread. Performing with them live resulted in two songs on the limited edition Performance album released in 1994. In the same year, Goldfrapp featured on trip hop artist Tricky's 1995 song "Pumpkin" and collaborated with Stefan Girardet on two songs on the soundtrack to the 1995 film The Confessional.

Goldfrapp was introduced to composer Will Gregory in 1999 after he had listened to her vocal contribution for "Pumpkin"; they then formed Goldfrapp and signed to Mute Records.

In 2000, she was a featured vocalist on the songs "The Time Of The Turning" and "The Time of the Turning (Reprise)/The Weaver's Reel" from the release OVO, Peter Gabriel's soundtrack album to the London Millennium Dome Show.

The pair began recording their debut album over a six-month period, beginning in September 1999, in a rented bungalow in the Wiltshire countryside. The band's debut album Felt Mountain was released in 2000 and featured Goldfrapp's synthesized vocals over cinematic soundscapes. Goldfrapp released their second album Black Cherry in 2003. The band recorded the album in Bath, England. This album focused more heavily on dance music and glam rock-inspired synths than its predecessor. Black Cherry peaked at number nineteen on the UK Albums Chart, where it has since been certified Platinum for sales in excess of 300,000 copies. It also sold over 52,000 copies in the US by 2006.

Supernature, Goldfrapp's third album, was released in 2005. The album comprises pop and electronic dance music prominently featured on Black Cherry, but focuses more on subtle hooks instead of the large choruses that made up its predecessor. It has sold one million copies worldwide and earned the duo two nominations at the 2007 Grammy Awards for Best Electronic/Dance Album and Best Dance Recording for the song "Ooh La La".

Seventh Tree, Goldfrapp's fourth album, was released in 2008 and debuted at number two on the UK Albums Chart. The album is a departure from the pop and electronic dance music featured on Supernature, featuring ambient and downtempo music. The band were inspired by an acoustic radio session they had performed, which led the duo to incorporate acoustic guitars into their music to create "warm" and "delicate" sounds.

In 2009, she was awarded an Honorary Doctor of Music degree by the University of Portsmouth.

Goldfrapp have released seven albums, most recently Silver Eye in 2017. Hits include "Strict Machine", "Ooh La La", "Lovely Head" and "A&E". The multi-platinum selling band have been nominated for the Mercury Prize, multiple Brit and Grammy Awards and won an Ivor Novello for "Strict Machine".

Goldfrapp scored the films My Summer of Love and Nowhere Boy.

In recent years, Goldfrapp has dedicated more time to her role as a photographer and director. She created and photographed the album artwork for Silver Eye and directed videos for singles "Systemagic", "Everything Is Never Enough" and "Ocean".

In September 2021, Goldfrapp were awarded the Ivor Novello 'Inspiration Award' which celebrates "peer recognition for the excellence of the Goldfrapp songwriting catalogue and in particular how it has inspired the creative talent of other creators".

=== Solo projects ===
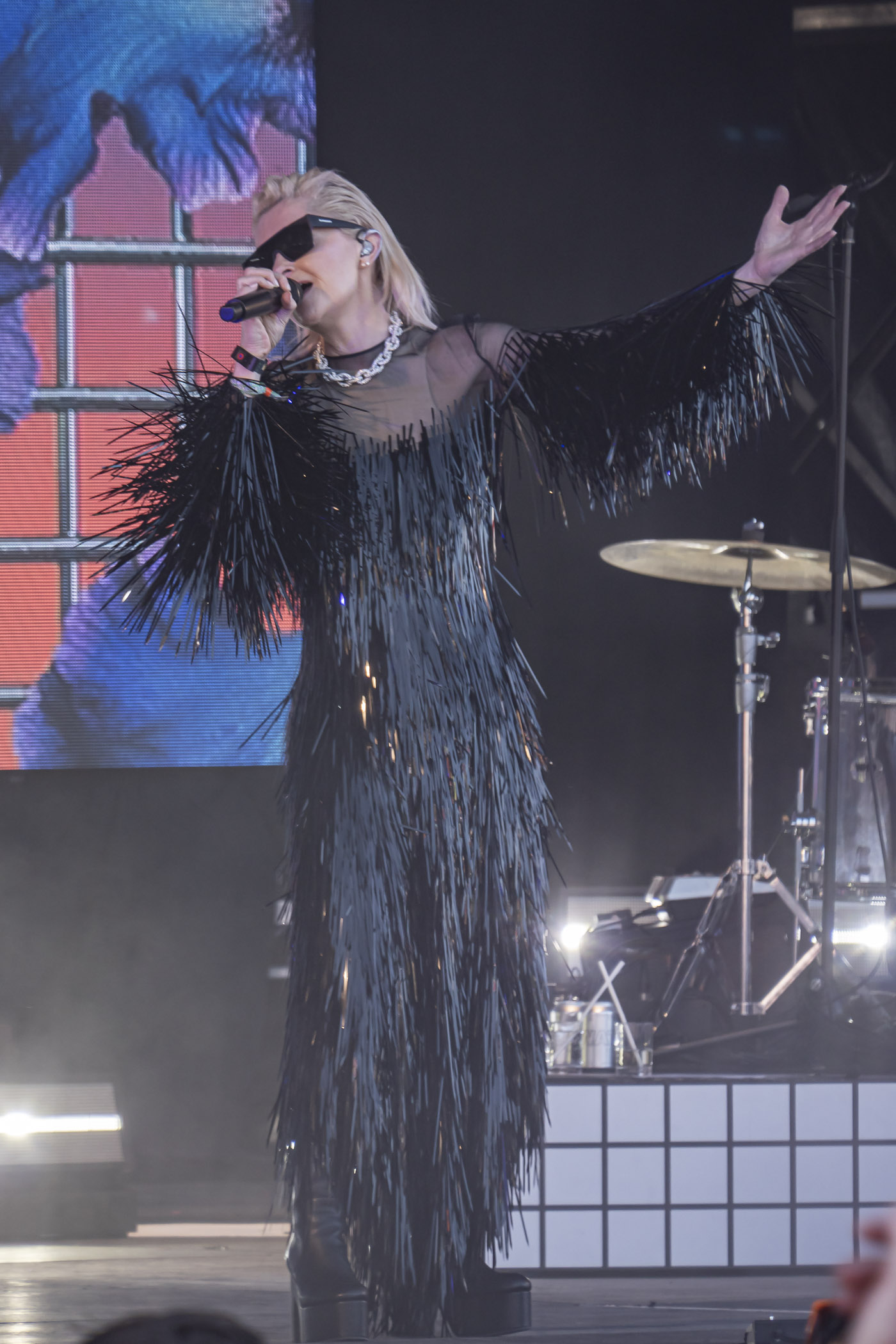
Alison Goldfrapp performing at the Glastonbury Festival in 2023

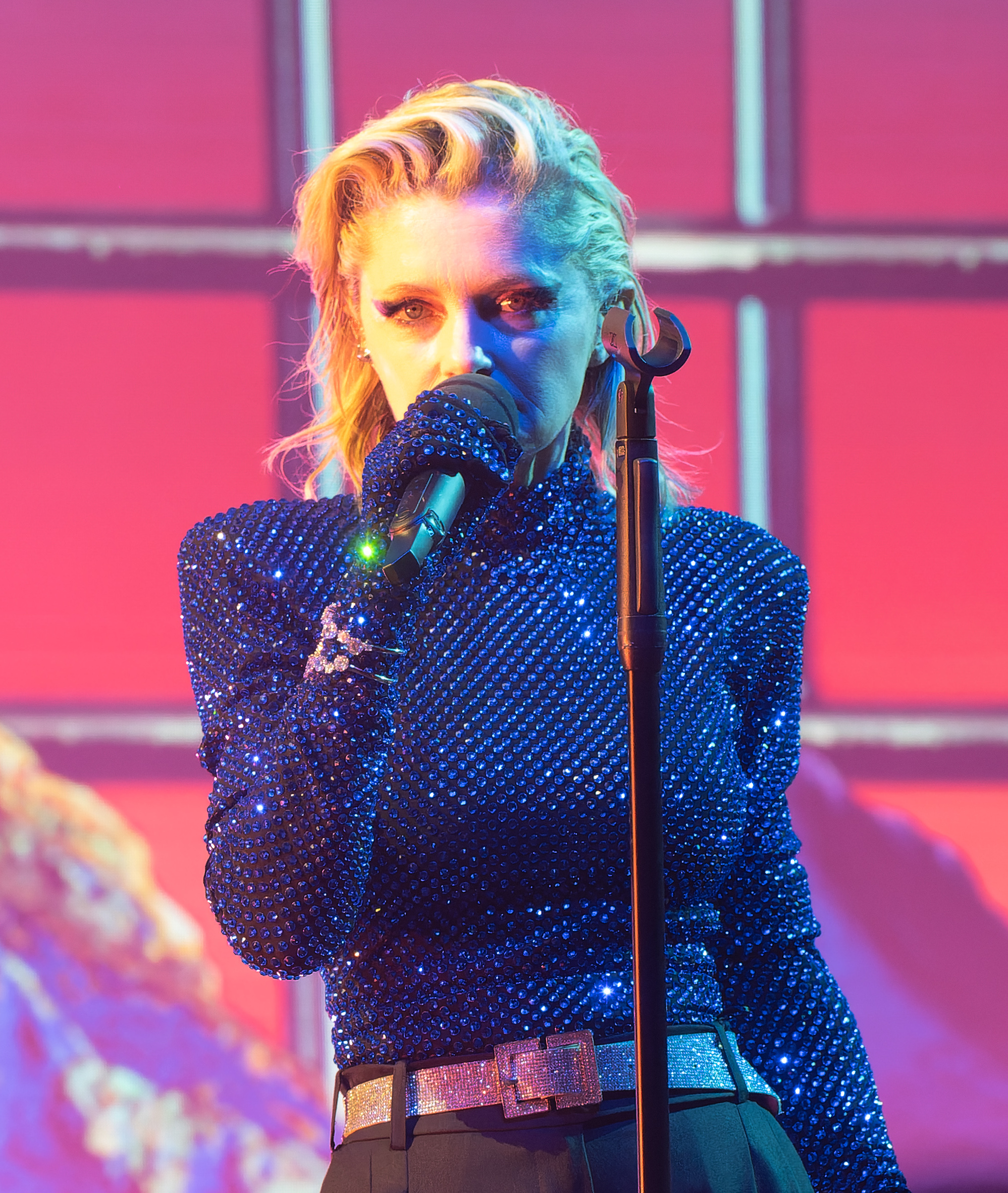
Goldfrapp in May 2023

In January 2023, Goldfrapp confirmed she would be releasing her first music as a solo act under her name. On 19 January, her collaboration track with Claptone, "Digging Deeper", was released. In February 2023, Goldfrapp released "Fever" with Paul Woolford.

On 16 March 2023, Goldfrapp announced her debut solo album, The Love Invention, which was released on 12 May 2023. Goldfrapp described the album as "my tribute to the dance floor". The lead single, "So Hard So Hot", was released alongside the announcement on 16 March. The album reached no.6 in the UK Album charts (matching previous Goldfrapp albums Head First and Silver Eye). It was followed in 2024 by the companion remix album The Love Reinvention.

On 24 July 2024, Goldfrapp announced that she had launched her own record label, A.G Records; its first release was the standalone single "I Wanna Be Loved (Just a Little Better)".

On 30 April 2025, Goldfrapp released a single titled "Find Xanadu". Alongside it, she announced the release of her second studio album, titled Flux, which the single is part of. The album was put up for pre-order, while its cover, release date and track list were made public.

On 16 May 2025, Alison started a ten-night UK & Republic of Ireland tour with Scissor Sisters. On 21 May 2025, Goldfrapp released second single "Reverberotic" from her forthcoming album Flux. The song premiered on BBC Radio 6 by Lauren Laverne. Prelude Press described "Reverberotic” as "a pulsating and hallucinogenic fever dream which distills the euphoric synth pop at the heart of Flux, blending visceral emotion with hyper-futuristic production…"

The third single titled "Sound & Light" from the forthcoming album Flux was released on 13 June 2025. According to Goldfrapp, “Sound & Light” comes based on a lifelong dream of hers. "I'd been chasing the Northern Lights for years", she says. "I'd gone to Finland, Iceland and Norway but never managed to catch them". She states the song was inspired by the sights, and her own "fantasy" of the stunning natural phenomenon, which she had longed to see her whole life. By some stroke of luck, Goldfrapp states that the very evening she began work on the track, she had been able to witness the lights, as if the song itself brought them out.

Goldfrapp recorded a cover of David Bowie's "Heroes" for the soundtrack of the 2025 television series The War Between the Land and the Sea.

== Artistry ==
=== Voice ===
"Goldfrapp's voice—ethereal, otherworldly, but always human—remains a constant variable, the cord that connects all of Goldfrapp's disparate, but equally captivating, incarnations."

— Sal Cinquemani, of Slant Magazine describing Goldfrapps's voice in a review for Head First.

Goldfrapp has a soprano vocal range. She is noted for her operatic abilities, particularly on the group's debut album Felt Mountain and prominently on the songs "Utopia" and "Pilots". Her delivery in a more contemporary voice has been described as "breathy", "sultry", "ethereal" and "startling".

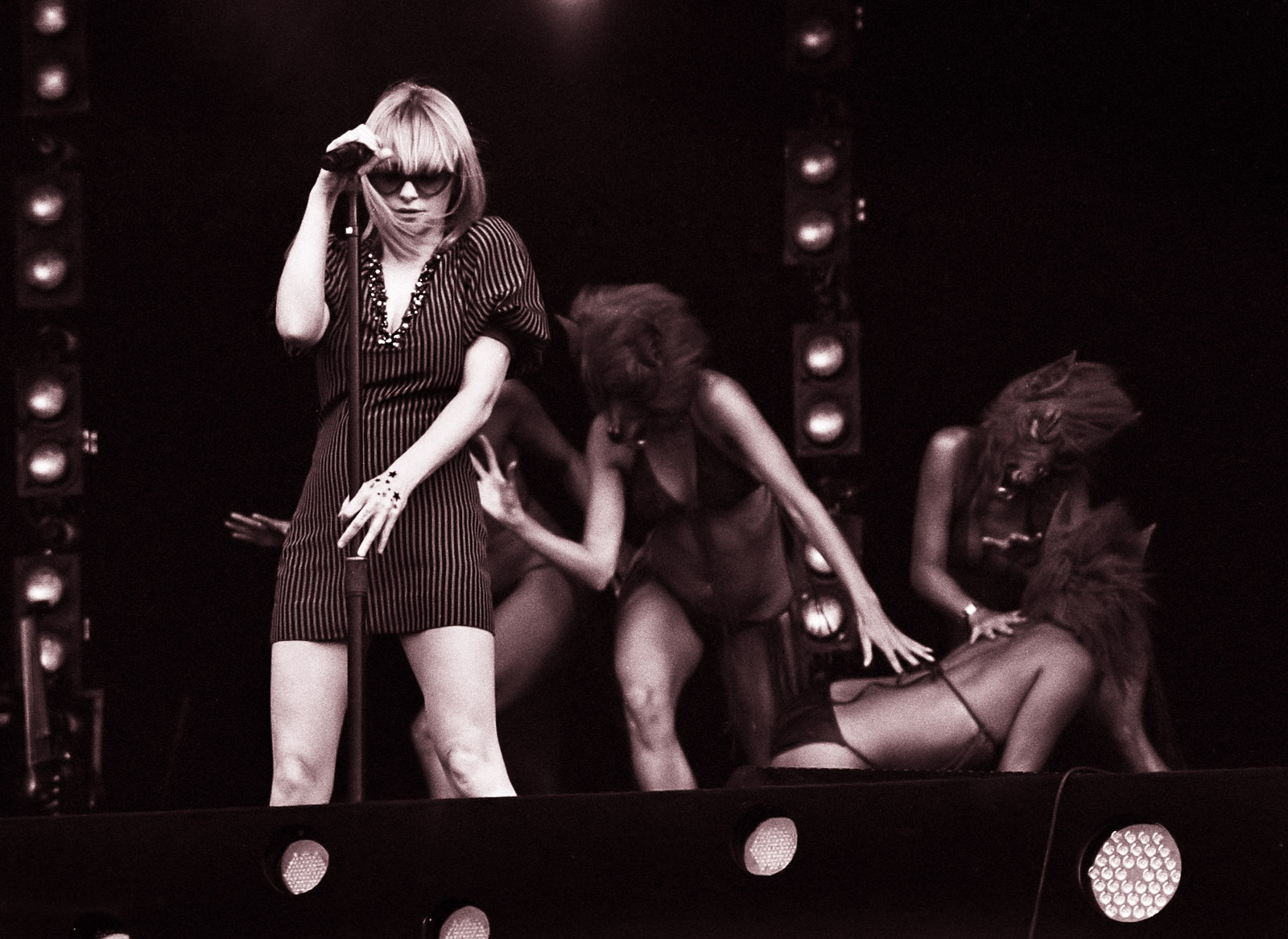
Goldfrapp performing as part of the Wireless Festival, London 2006

Goldfrapp has been commended for her vocal versatility, morphing her voice to fit various genres such as folk, pop, classical, dance, trip hop and electronica throughout her career. Goldfrapp has used a Korg MS20 Audio Envelope follower to manipulate her vocals, such as the song "Lovely Head" in which her voice is altered to resemble a theremin. Vocally, Goldfrapp has been compared to Marlene Dietrich, Siouxsie Sioux, Björk, Kate Bush and Elizabeth Fraser of the Cocteau Twins.

=== Compositions ===
Goldfrapp produces and writes most of her material alongside bandmate Will Gregory. She draws inspiration from a range of artists and musical genres. As a teenager she listened to Kate Bush, T. Rex, Donna Summer, Joan Jett, Marc Bolan, David Cassidy, and Iggy Pop and The Stooges, and discovered Serge Gainsbourg while working in Belgium. While travelling through Europe in the early 1990s, she began listening to Polish disco music and cabaret music from the Weimar Republic. Other media, including film, have influenced Goldfrapp who cites Roman Polanski's 1966 psychological thriller Cul-de-sac, the 1973 cult film The Wicker Man and the James Bond franchise as influences. She draws inspiration from surrealism and nature, all of which appear in Goldfrapp's album artwork, which she designs in collaboration with Big Active. Goldfrapp believes that "music is a visual experience" and therefore visualises her lyrics before writing them. While writing, Goldfrapp uses her vocals to create melodies and drumbeats. Her songwriting is characterised by its use of animals to describe human emotions and status.

== Public image ==
While touring in 2004, sections of the group's stage show featured Goldfrapp in a white dress wearing a horse tail and dancers with deer heads, which were inspired by her interest in animals and mythology.

The artwork for Goldfrapp's album Seventh Tree featured her dressed as a Pierrot. Her new image, inspired by paganism, featured her dressed in white or natural-coloured flowing gowns with loose curly blonde hair.

During 2010, Goldfrapp took on several new images to fit with their forthcoming album Head First. The music on this album was more '80s-influenced, reflected in the artwork featured on the album's first single, "Rocket", which features Goldfrapp in a pink jumpsuit. For their live shows, she wore spangly black leggings and a jacket covered in VHS tape which was blown about by two electric fans placed at front centre-stage. The shine of the plastic reflected the colourful stage lighting.

In 2013, Goldfrapp was invited by the Lowry, Salford, to curate an exhibition as part of their 'Performer as Curator' annual series. The exhibition was a collection of photography and paintings inspired by ideas of metamorphosis and fairytales.

== Personal life ==
Goldfrapp previously dated film editor Lisa Gunning which she confirmed in a February 2010 interview with The Sunday Times saying, "I think of everything as being about a person and a relationship, and I am in a wonderful relationship with a wonderful person. It just happens to be with a lady... It's something I've thought about for a long time and it concurs with my philosophy on life and sexuality. I don't think it can or should be pigeonholed. I've thought about this since I was a teenager. I've always found it claustrophobic to think about having to put things into categories like that. My sexuality is the same as my music and my life. Why does it need a label?" Goldfrapp's relationships before this were with men.

Goldfrapp is dyslexic. She was nominated for the peta2 Sexiest Vegetarian Award in 2007.

== Discography ==
=== Albums ===
List of studio albums, with selected details
Title	Details	Peak chart positions	
Title	Details	UK	GER
The Love Invention	Released: 12 May 2023; Label: BMG; Formats: CD, LP, digital download, streaming	6	39
Flux	Released: 15 August 2025; Label: A.G.; Formats: CD, LP, digital download, streaming	13	—

=== Singles ===
List of singles, with chart positions and certifications, showing year released and album name
Title	Year	Peak chart positions	Album	Ref.
Title	Year	UK Dig.	Album	Ref.
"Digging Deeper" (with Claptone)	2023	72	The Love Invention	
"Fever" (with Paul Woolford)	2023	—	The Love Invention	
"So Hard So Hot"	2023	80	The Love Invention	
"NeverStop"	2023	—	The Love Invention	
"Love Invention"	2023	—	The Love Invention	
"In Electric Blue"	2023	—	The Love Invention	
"Every Little Drop"	2023	—	The Love Reinvention	
"I Wanna Be Loved (Just A Little Better)"	2024	—	Non-album single	
"Dream Machine" (with Purple Disco Machine)	2025	—	Paradise (Deluxe)	
"Find Xanadu"	2025	—	Flux	
"Reverberotic"	2025	—	Flux	
"Sound & Light"	2025		Flux	
"Heroes"	2025	—	The War Between the Land and the Sea	
