= Will Gregory =

English musician and record producer (born 1959)

- Born: William Owen Gregory; 17 September 1959 (age 66); Bristol, England
- Genres: Electronic; trip hop; synth-pop; Western orchestral/chamber
- Occupations: Musician; record producer
- Instruments: Keyboards; drum programming; guitars; synthesizer; oboe; saxophone
- Years active: 1981–present
- Label: Mute

William Owen Gregory (born 17 September 1959) is an English musician and record producer. He is best known as the lead keyboardist, producer, and composer of the electronic music duo Goldfrapp.

== Early life ==
William Owen Gregory was born on 17 September 1959 in Bristol, the son of an actress and an opera chorus-line singer.

I got into music kind of by default as it was the only thing I was good at – I was the weird one at school who practiced the piano during lunch break. In my teens I met other musicians and was so relieved to find some like-minds that I think I never wanted to leave the 'weird' muso club – perhaps it’s the same for many musicians. I ended up playing oboe and then moved on to sax, which got me into diverse musical disciplines.

He studied Western orchestral and chamber music at the University of York.

== Career ==
In the 1980s, Gregory predominantly recorded and toured with Tears for Fears.

In the 1990s, Gregory performed with artists including Peter Gabriel, the Cure, and Portishead, as well as playing oboe for Tori Amos and recording with Paula Rae Gibson. In 1991, he played saxophone with the London Sinfonietta for the Paris début of John Adams's opera Nixon in China. In 1999, vocalist Alison Goldfrapp and Gregory formed the duo Goldfrapp. The pairing has led to international critical, popular, and commercial success. In 1995 Gregory composed the score for the football hooligan film I.D.

In the 2000s, as well as Goldfrapp activities, he played saxophone on Portishead's 2008 album Third (on the tracks "Magic Doors" and "Threads").

On 31 March 2011, Gregory's first opera, Piccard in Space, premiered at the Queen Elizabeth Hall, London. The libretto by Hattie Naylor focused on Auguste Piccard and Paul Kipfer's first balloon ascent, and the theories of Albert Einstein and Isaac Newton, both of whom are characters in the drama. The reviews were generally negative.

On 11 March 2013, a newly commissioned baroquesque Gregory work (for orchestra and Moog, based on a sarabande of Johann Sebastian Bach) was performed at the Roundhouse in London. The performance was part of BBC Radio 3's Baroque Remixed series, which also included a piece by Matthew Herbert.

Gregory's other saxophone work includes writing for and playing with the Apollo Saxophone Quartet, and playing with Spiritualized, Moondog and Michael Nyman.

He composed the music for the 2017 series Spy in the Wild.

He composed the music for the Royal Shakespeare Company's 2019 production of King John at the Swan Theatre, Stratford-upon-Avon. It was announced in 2021 that Gregory would provide an original score featuring Alison Goldfrapp and Adrian Utley for the BBC and Amazon Prime Video psychological thriller series Chloe.

In October 2025 he was nominated for an Ivor Novello Award for his piece Heat Ray: The Archimedes Project.

== Discography ==
with Tears for Fears

- Songs from the Big Chair (1985)

with Tori Amos

- Little Earthquakes (1992)

with Peter Gabriel

- OVO (2000)
- Up (2002)
- Long Walk Home: Music from the Rabbit-Proof Fence (2002)

with Portishead

- Roseland NYC Live (1998)
- Third (2008)

with other artists

- Four Ways to Cook a Goose – Loggerheads (1987)
- Gas Giants – Gas Giants (1994)

Film soundtracks

- I.D. (1995)
- Serengeti (2020, BBC/Discovery Channel wildlife documentary)

Television soundtracks

- Old Bear Stories (Carlton Television for ITV, 1993–1997)
- BBC - Shoot For The Moon (About Space Mountain Paris, 1995)

== See also ==
- List of bands from Bristol
- Culture of Bristol
