= List of awards and nominations received by Goldfrapp =

Goldfrapp awards and nominations
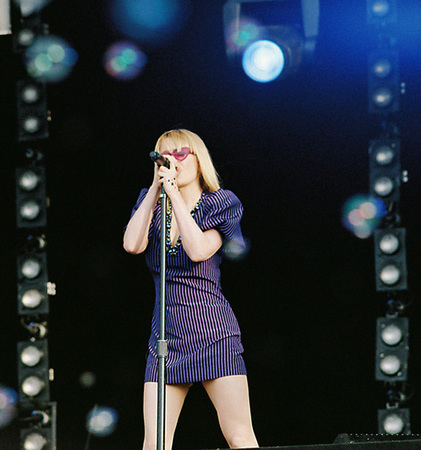
- Alison Goldfrapp performing in 2006
Award	Wins	Nominations
ASCAP/PRS Awards	1	1
Brit Awards	0	2
BT Digital Music Awards	0	1
Grammy Awards	0	4
International Dance Music Awards	0	2
Ivor Novello Awards	1	1
Mercury Prize	0	1
MTV Europe Music Awards	0	1
Q Awards	0	1
UK Music Video Awards	0	1
Music Producers Guild Awards	1	1
- Totals
Awards won	8
Nominations	37

Goldfrapp are an English electronic music duo that formed in London in 1999. The group gained prominence after their debut studio album Felt Mountain was shortlisted for the 2001 Mercury Prize in the United Kingdom. They have released five studio albums: Felt Mountain (2000), Black Cherry (2003), Supernature (2005), Seventh Tree (2008) and Head First (2010). The group's remix album, We Are Glitter was released in the United States in October 2006 and the compilation album The Singles was released internationally in February 2012.

Black Cherry was released through Mute Records in April 2003. Singles from the album included "Train", "Strict Machine" and "Twist". Black Cherry earned the group two awards, including an Ivor Novello Award (The Ivors Dance Award) for the song "Strict Machine". Supernature was released through the same label in August 2005. The album earned Goldfrapp two Grammy Award nominations in the dance category. Their fourth album, Seventh Tree, was released in February 2008. Singles included "A&E", "Happiness" and "Caravan Girl". The music video for "Happiness" earned Goldfrapp and director Dougal Wilson a nomination for Best Pop Video at the UK Music Video Awards. Head First was released in March 2010. The album earned the group two additional Grammy Award nominations.

Other recognitions include the inclusion of Supernature on Rolling Stone magazine's "Top 50 Albums of 2006" list. Goldfrapp have also been recognized by the ASCAP/PRS Awards, BT Digital Music Awards, International Dance Music Awards, MTV Europe Music Awards and the Q Awards. Overall, Goldfrapp have received two awards from 15 nominations.

== AIM Independent Music Awards ==
AIM is a trade body established in 1999 to provide a collective voice for the UK's independent music industry.

Year	Nominee / work	Award	Result
2017	"Anymore"	Independent Track of the Year	Nominated

== ASCAP/PRS Awards ==
The ASCAP/PRS Awards are presented annually by the American Society of Composers, Authors and Publishers (ASCAP) to British writer and publisher members of the PRS for Music (PRS) for significant performances of their works in the United States. Goldfrapp have received one award from one nomination.

Year	Nominated work	Award	Result	Ref.
2004	Goldfrapp	Dance Award	Won	

== Best Art Vinyl ==
The Best Art Vinyl Awards are yearly awards established in 2005 by Art Vinyl Ltd to celebrate the best album artwork of the past year.

Year	Nominated work	Award	Result	Ref.
2005	Supernature	Best Vinyl Art	Nominated	
2008	Seventh Tree	Best Vinyl Art	Nominated	

== Brit Awards ==
The Brit Awards are the British Phonographic Industry's (BPI) annual pop music awards. Goldfrapp have been nominated twice.

Year	Nominated work	Award	Result	Ref.
2004	Goldfrapp	Best British Dance Act	Nominated	
2015	Alison Goldfrapp and Will Gregory	British Producer of the Year	Nominated	

== BT Digital Music Awards ==
Created in 2001, the BT Digital Music Awards are awarded annually by the British telecommunications company BT. Goldfrapp have been nominated twice.

Year	Nominated work	Award	Result	Ref.
2004	Goldfrapp	Best Dance Artist	Nominated	
2005	Goldfrapp	Best Pop Artist	Nominated	

== D&AD Awards ==
Design and Art Direction (D&AD) is a British educational charity which exists to promote excellence in design and advertising.

Year	Nominee / work	Award	Result
2004	"Strict Machine"	Animation	Wood Pencil
2009	"Happiness"	Music Video	Graphite Pencil

== DanceStar USA Awards ==
Year	Nominee / work	Award	Result	Ref.
2004	Black Cherry	Best New Artist Album	Nominated	

== GLAAD Media Awards ==
The GLAAD Media Awards were created in 1990 by the Gay & Lesbian Alliance Against Defamation to "recognize and honor media for their fair, accurate and inclusive representations of the LGBT community and the issues that affect their lives."

Year	Nominee / work	Award	Result
2014	Tales of Us	Outstanding Music Artist	Nominated

== Gay Music Chart Awards ==
Year	Nominated work	Award	Result	Ref.
2017	"Systemagic"	Best Queer Music Video	Nominated	

== Grammy Awards ==
The Grammy Awards are awarded annually by the National Academy of Recording Arts and Sciences of the United States for outstanding achievements in the record industry. Often considered the highest music honor, the awards were established in 1958. Goldfrapp have received four nominations.

Year	Nominated work	Award	Result	Ref.
2007	"Ooh La La"	Best Dance Recording	Nominated	
2007	Supernature	Best Dance/Electronica Album	Nominated	
2011	"Rocket"	Best Dance Recording	Nominated	
2011	Head First	Best Dance/Electronica Album	Nominated	

== Ibiza Music Video Festival ==
Ibiza Music Video Festival is a global and interactive music video festival.

Year	Nominee / work	Award	Result
2017	"Systemagic"	Best Choreography	Nominated

== International Dance Music Awards ==
The International Dance Music Awards, which take place during the annual Winter Music Conference, recognize achievements in the electronic dance music industry. Goldfrapp have received three nominations.

Year	Nominated work	Award	Result	Ref.
2005	"Strict Machine"	Best Underground Dance Track	Nominated	
2007	"Number 1"	Best Progressive House/Trance Track	Nominated	
2011	Themselves	Best Artist (Group)	Nominated	

== Ivor Novello Awards ==
The Ivor Novello Awards, named after the Cardiff-born entertainer Ivor Novello, are awards for songwriting and composing. Goldfrapp have received two awards from two nominations.

Year	Nominated work	Award	Result	Ref.
2004	"Strict Machine"	The Ivors Dance Award	Won	
2021	Collection	The Ivors Inspiration Award	Won	

== Mercury Prize ==
The Mercury Prize is an annual music prize awarded for the best album from the United Kingdom and Ireland. Goldfrapp have been nominated once.

Year	Nominated work	Award	Result	Ref.
2001	Felt Mountain	Mercury Prize	Nominated	

== Music Week Awards ==
Founded by British music magazine Music Week, the Music Week Awards are presented annually.

Year	Nominated work	Award	Result	Ref.
2004	"Strict Machine"	Best Art Direction	Won	

== MTV Europe Music Awards ==
The MTV Europe Music Awards were established in 1994 by MTV Europe to celebrate the most popular music videos in Europe. Goldfrapp have been nominated once.

Year	Nominated work	Award	Result	Ref.
2003	Goldfrapp	Web Award	Won	
2005	Goldfrapp	Best Alternative	Nominated	

== Muso Awards ==
The Muso Awards is a charity music award ceremony held in London, England, that began in September 2002. The awards are voted "by musicians, for musicians", and the ceremony features live performances by a variety of artists. The 2005 event was held at Koko, in Camden Town, very few winners were present to receive their awards.

Year	Nominee / work	Award	Result	Ref.
2005	Alison Goldfrapp	Best Female Vocal	Won	

== PLUG Awards ==
The PLUG Awards are given in support of indie music.

Year	Nominee / work	Award	Result
2007	We Are Glitter	Electronic/Dance Album of the Year	Nominated

== Q Awards ==
The Q Awards are the UK's annual pop music awards run by the music magazine Q magazine to honor musical excellence. Winners are voted by readers of Q.

Year	Nominee / work	Award	Result
2001	Themselves	Best New Act	Nominated
2003	Themselves	Q Innovation in Sound	Nominated
2005	Supernature	Best Album	Nominated
2008	"Happiness"	Best Video	Nominated

== Popjustice 20 Quid Music Prize ==
The Popjustice £20 Music Prize, also known as the Popjustice Twenty Quid Prize, is an annual prize awarded by music website Popjustice to recognise the best British pop single of the previous year. The prize was conceived by Popjustice founder Peter Robinson in 2003 as a reaction to what he perceived as the pompous and elitist nature of the existing Mercury Prize, which recognises the best album of the previous year, and in particular its exclusion of pop music acts in favour of those from more esoteric genres. The shortlist for the Popjustice prize is announced in September of each year and the winner named the following month, to coincide with the presentation of the Mercury Prize. Popjustice gives a token prize of £20 to the winner of its award, in contrast to the £20,000 given to the winner of the Mercury Prize.

Year	Nominee / work	Award	Result
2005	"Ooh La La"	Best British Pop Single	Nominated
2006	"Number 1"	Best British Pop Single	Nominated
2008	"A&E"	Best British Pop Single	Nominated

== UK Festival Awards ==
Year	Nominee / work	Award	Result	Ref.
2006	Goldfrapp	Best Dance Act	Nominated	

== UK Music Video Awards ==
The UK Music Video Awards recognize "creativity and technical excellence" in music videos made within the United Kingdom. Goldfrapp have been nominated once.

Year	Nominated work	Award	Result	Ref.
2008	"Happiness"	Best Pop Video – UK	Nominated	

== Music Producers Guild Awards ==
The Music Producers Guild Awards are awarded annually by the Music Producers Guild, a UK Music not-for-profit company run by volunteers from the membership.

Year	Nominated work	Award	Result	Ref.
2015	"Tales of Us"	UK Album of the Year	Won	

== Other recognitions ==
- 2006 – Rolling Stone magazine ranked Supernature number 32 on their "Top 50 Albums of 2006" list
- 2009 – Seventh Tree was ranked at number 19 by Q in their list of "50 Best Albums of 2008"
