= Addington Square =

Garden square in the London Borough of Southwark, England

Coordinates: 51.481°N 0.092°W

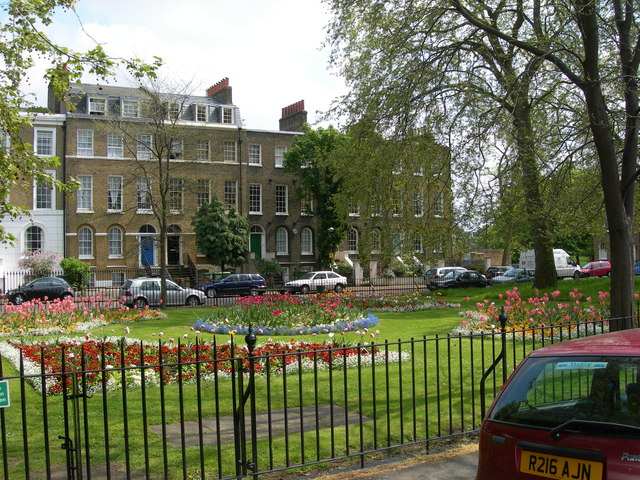
Addington Square looking east

Addington Square is a Georgian and Regency garden square in Camberwell in the London Borough of Southwark which is named after the early 19th century prime minister Henry Addington.

== History ==
Addington Square is an unusually well-preserved conservation area with the houses that make up the east, south and west sides of the square listed Grade II. On the north side is the Southwark City Tennis Club / Burgess Park Tennis Centre.

In the 1960s, the square was the base of the Richardson Gang, a south London rival to the Kray twins. They ran a private drinking club from the square, which had "Mad" Frankie Fraser and two dancing bears in residence. According to the gang's Old Bailey trial in 1967, the club was used to kangaroo court and torture rivals. The bears escaped onto Camberwell Road one night.

More than a century earlier, one of the founders of the National Trust, Robert Hunter had been born in the square in 1844, and it was also the home of Liberal politician Charles Masterman.

Construction of the square in the early 19th century came with the Grand Surrey Canal which terminated at Camberwell Wharf lying on the north side of the square. The first house in the square (now number 48) was completed by 1810 and owned by Nathaniel Simmons who was the engineer to the Grand Surrey Canal Company. Most of the rest of the square was built by 1827, and the square was complete by 1844. The 1851 census shows 32 houses with 179 residents and 33 servants, an occupancy rate of 6.2 persons per house. Nikolaus Pevsner points out in his The Buildings of England that as the construction was completed over a period of time (unlike most North London squares) "uniformity was abandoned" leading to "the pleasant irregular early c19 houses and terraces around Addington Square."

It was completed as a private square in 1855. By 1897 the square had become derelict, but was renovated and opened for public use; the Metropolitan Public Gardens Association donated six seats in 1898.

There were also public baths and a swimming pool on the north side until the turn of the 19th/20th centuries, and a scandal involving a parson in bathhouse activities is commemorated in a rare satirical poem found in the library of Cornell University. In the late 1930s the King George's Fields Foundation gave a grant of £1,000 towards the cost of £5,363 of acquiring the former swimming pool and turning it into a public garden.

In 2008 it was used as the location for the electronic duo Goldfrapp's music video for their single "Happiness", which features on their fourth studio album, Seventh Tree. The video focused on a young man in a white suit joyfully jumping down the streets in Addington Square, and featured the duo in a variety of cameos.
