= Dougal Wilson =

English video director (born 1971)

- Born: Dougal Stewart Wilson; August 1971 (age 55); Heswall, Merseyside, England
- Education: Durham University
- Occupations: Music video director; commercial director
- Years active: 2001–present

Dougal Stewart Wilson (born August 1971) is an English director of commercials, music videos and films. His work includes directing several John Lewis Christmas adverts and the Grammy-nominated music video for "Life in Technicolor II" (2009) by Coldplay. He made his feature film debut with Paddington in Peru (2024), the third installment in the Paddington franchise.

== Early life and inspiration ==
Wilson was born in Heswall, Merseyside in August 1971. In his youth, he played in a series of bands. Inspired by Stanley Kubrick's epic science fiction film 2001: A Space Odyssey (1968), and interested in astronomy, Wilson decided to study natural sciences at Durham University. While studying, he began designing posters for university gigs and plays and making sets for some of those plays in his spare time.

Wilson graduated from Durham in 1992. He was inspired to become a director after hearing a BBC Radio 4 interview with Ridley Scott and Alan Parker in which they said that they got started in feature films through directing commercials. The first advert Wilson directed was at the Leith advertising agency in Edinburgh, where he was working as a copywriter before moving to London.

== Career ==
Wilson has directed commercials for companies such as Apple, IKEA, Orange, Stella Artois, Olympus, AT&T, Safestore, Beck's Brewery, and Coca-Cola. His Christmas adverts for UK department store John Lewis & Partners, including "The Long Wait" (2011), "The Journey" (2012), "Monty the Penguin" (2014), "Buster the Boxer" (2016), and "Excitable Edgar" (2019), have become a widely talked-about part of British popular culture. In 2016, he filmed the three-minute advert We're the Superhumans, promoting Channel 4's broadcast of the 2016 Summer Paralympics in Rio de Janeiro.

His numerous music videos include "Satisfaction" for Benny Benassi, "Tribulations" for LCD Soundsystem, "Who Am I" for Will Young, "Take Me Back to Your House" for Basement Jaxx, "Don't Let Him Waste Your Time" for Jarvis Cocker, "What's a Girl to Do?" for Bat for Lashes, "Happiness" and "A&E" for Goldfrapp, and "Life in Technicolor II" for Coldplay.

In 2007, he co-directed a short film called Rubbish, starring Martin Freeman, Anna Friel and James Lance. The following year, he directed a four-minute silent comedy homage for Sky Arts and the English National Opera, based on The Barber of Seville aria "Largo al factotum" and starring Mathew Baynton as Figaro. In October 2010, a short film directed by Wilson and featuring Gillian Anderson, No Pressure, was released by the 10:10 campaign in Britain to spread awareness of climate change. The four-minute film was written by Richard Curtis and showed groups of people being asked whether they are interested in participating in the project to reduce carbon emissions, and then gruesomely blown to pieces after failing to show enthusiasm for the cause. The film provoked an immediate negative reaction in the media and was withdrawn from public circulation on the same day it was released.

In June 2022, it was announced that Wilson would be set to direct his first feature film, Paddington in Peru, the third instalment in the Paddington franchise. In a statement to Variety, he said, "As a huge fan of the first two films, I am very excited (if not a little intimidated) to be continuing the story of Paddington. It's a massive responsibility, but all my efforts will be focussed on making a third film that honours the love so many people have for this very special bear." The film released in the United Kingdom on 8 November 2024 to positive reviews.

In 2026 Wilson had directed a Christmas-themed short film The Invisible Horse for Disney.

== Accolades ==
Wilson has twice won Best Director at the UK Creative and Design Awards, in 2004 and 2005, as well as having won Gold, Silver and Bronze Lions at the Cannes Lions International Advertising Festival and Design and Art Direction awards in 2006 and 2008. He was named Director of the Year by Ad Age in 2019, and was recognised in Adweek’s Creative 100 of professionals behind the "most innovative work" in 2018. In 2020, he was nominated by the Directors Guild of America for Outstanding Directorial Achievement in Commercials.

Wilson has received two Best Video nominations at the 2004 and 2007 MTV Europe Music Awards for directing The Streets music video for "Fit but You Know It" and Bat for Lashes's "What's a Girl to Do?". At the 2008 UK Music Video Awards, the music video for Goldfrapp's single "Happiness" earned him nominations for both Best Director and Best Pop Video. At the 52nd Annual Grammy Awards, he was up for Best Short Form Music Video with Coldplay's "Life in Technicolor II".

He was also pictured on the front cover of the March 2009 edition of Creativity magazine wearing a jet pack and seemingly hovering a few feet above the ground in front of a car park. Inside, he led the edition's main article, "Directing 101", in which "15 top directors" dispensed advices learned on the job.

== Filmography ==
Short film

- Rubbish (2007) (co-directed with Ed Roe)
- Largo al factotum (2009)
- No Pressure (2010)
- Disney's The Invisible Horse (2026)

Feature film

- Paddington in Peru (2024)

Music video

Year	Title	Artist	Notes
2002	"Carbon Kid" (featuring Brian Molko)	Alpinestars	
2002	"Year 3000"	Busted	Co-directed with Tom Gravestock
2002	"Satisfaction"	Benny Benassi	
2003	"Remember Me"	British Sea Power	
2003	"Three Girl Rhumba"	Klonhertz	
2003	"She Moves She"	Four Tet	
2003	"As Serious As Your Life"	Four Tet	
2004	"Fit but You Know It"	The Streets	Nominated for the MTV Europe Music Award for Best Video
2004	"Friday's Child"	Will Young	
2004	"Dream"	Dizzee Rascal	
2005	"Cash Machine"	Hard-Fi	
2005	"Tribulations"	LCD Soundsystem	
2006	"Who Am I"	Will Young	
2006	"Take Me Back to Your House"	Basement Jaxx	
2006	"Assassinator 13"	Chikinki	
2007	"Don't Let Him Waste Your Time"	Jarvis Cocker	
2007	"What's a Girl to Do?"	Bat for Lashes	Nominated for the MTV Europe Music Award for Best Video
2008	"A&E"	Goldfrapp	
2008	"Happiness"	Goldfrapp	Nominated for the UK Music Video Award for Best Pop Video
2009	"Life in Technicolor II"	Coldplay	Nominated for the Grammy Award for Best Short Form Music Video
2010	"Love Lost"	The Temper Trap	
2010	"Psyche"	Massive Attack	
2012	"Party Pom Pom"	Adam Buxton	
2015	"Apparition"	Stealing Sheep	
