= Clowns (song) =

Single by Goldfrapp

from the album Seventh Tree
- Released: 20 October 2008
- Genre: Folktronica; downtempo
- Length: 4:10
- Label: Mute
- Songwriters: Alison Goldfrapp; Will Gregory
- Producers: Alison Goldfrapp; Will Gregory

Goldfrapp singles chronology
"Caravan Girl" (2008)	"Clowns" (2008)	"Rocket" (2010)

"Clowns" is a song by English electronic music duo Goldfrapp from their fourth studio album, Seventh Tree (2008). The song was written and produced by Alison Goldfrapp and Will Gregory. It was released as the album's fourth and final single in October 2008.

On 20 October 2008, "Clowns" was made available as a free download from Goldfrapp's official website and Myspace page. A live version of the song, performed at the 2008 BBC Electric Proms, was also released as a free download. As part of the newspaper's week of free Goldfrapp giveaways, The Guardian released a live version of "Clowns" recorded at Union Chapel in London. The song was played at end of the 2009 film Veronika Decides to Die. It has been covered by Melora Creager of Rasputina.

In a video interview with Blender, Alison Goldfrapp stated the song was about the overabundance of women on reality television with breast implants.

== Official versions ==
1. "Clowns" (album version) – 4:10
2. "Clowns" (instrumental version) – 4:07
3. "Clowns" (live from BBC Electric Proms 2008) – 4:32
4. "Clowns" (live from Union Chapel) – 4:22

== Charts ==
Chart (2010)	Peak position
UK Singles (OCC)	115
