= Tales of Us Tour =

2013–14 concert tour by Goldfrapp

Tales of Us: Tour
- Tour by Goldfrapp
- Associated album: Tales of Us
- Start date: 23 June 2013
- End date: 31 July 2014
- No. of shows: 1 in North America; 5 in Europe; 15 in UK; 21 total

Goldfrapp concert chronology
- Head First World Tour (2010–2011); Tales of Us Tour (2013–2014)

Tales of Us is the sixth concert tour from British band Goldfrapp in support of their sixth studio album, Tales of Us, released in September 2013.

== Development ==
The tour was announced in early June 2013, following the announcement of the release of their new album through their official website. The band announced dates in Europe and Australia, the first concert was a warm up show in Bristol at the Trinity Centre, with 2 further shows at the Albert Hall in Manchester, England as part of the Manchester International Festival and sees the premiere of all songs from the new album, including some of the band's biggest hits. Also announced was a date at Somerset House as part of the "Summer Series" and 2 festival dates. The tour officially kicked off in Amsterdam in October 2013.

== Band ==
The band consists of 6 members (including Alison Goldfrapp). These are:

- Alison Goldfrapp – vocals
- Ellie Stanford – violin
- Alex Lee – guitars
- Angie Pollock – keyboards, backing vocals
- Charlie Jones – bass guitar
- Seb Sternberg – drums

== Set lists ==
For the first 5 dates each set list varied. The Manchester shows was a showcase of their new album and included each song from it and a few others specifically from their previous albums Felt Mountain and Seventh Tree. London's Somerset House concert featured a selection of songs from Tales of Us, in addition to tracks from all their previous studio albums – including "Number 1", "You Never Know", "Ooh La La", "Paper Bag", "Shiny and Warm", "Ride a White Horse", "A&E", "Caravan Girl", "Black Cherry", "Train", "Strict Machine" and others.

=== Main tour set list ===
The following set list is representative of most dates on the tour.

1. Jo
2. Drew
3. Stranger
4. Alvar
5. Annabel
6. Clay
7. Yellow Halo
8. Little Bird
9. You Never Know
10. Thea
11. Number One
12. Ride A White Horse
13. Train
14. Utopia
15. Clowns
16. Lovely Head
17. Strict Machine

== Reception ==
The reviews for the tour were extremely positive.

Billboard.com gave a positive review of the Beacon Theatre show in New York City and ended by saying "By the time the entire Beacon stood up for the celebratory finale, "Caravan Girl", it was clear that the magic of Goldfrapp and the orchestra on Tuesday night would be hard to duplicate, even by a likely return to the States in 2014." The Independent reviewed the Somerset House with 4/5 rating although never criticising the band's new music, they stated "They may find it a challenge touring their delicate new material, but Goldfrapp still put on a heck of a show."

The London Evening Standard reviewed Goldfrapp as part of their sum up of the Lovebox festival in London, by stating "Alison Goldfrapp re-established herself as Madonna's stranger sister and her band brought Lovebox to a thrilling close". At the end of their review they went on to say "None was better than Goldfrapp, who sent the punters home on a high. Without them, this would have felt less like a super Sunday and more like a superfluous one".

== Tour dates ==
Date	City	Country	Venue
Warm Up Tour
23 June 2013	Bristol	England	Trinity Centre
Album Launch
17 July 2013	Manchester	England	Albert Hall, Manchester
18 July 2013	Manchester	England	Albert Hall, Manchester
20 July 2013	London	England	Somerset House
21 July 2013	London	England	Victoria Park
10 September 2013	New York City	United States	Beacon Theatre
European Tour
21 October 2013	Amsterdam	Netherlands	Paradiso (Amsterdam)
22 October 2013	Brussels	Belgium	Ancienne Belgique
23 October 2013	Berlin	Germany	Heimathafen Neukölln
25 October 2013	Paris	France	Theatre Le Trianon
26 October 2013	Zürich	Switzerland	Kaufleuten
1 November 2013	London	England	Hammersmith Apollo
European Tour
26 March 2014	Birmingham	England	Symphony Hall
27 March 2014	Manchester	England	The Lowry
29 March 2014	Brighton	England	Brighton Dome
30 March 2014	Portsmouth	England	Guildhall
1 April 2014	Bristol	England	Colston Hall
2 April 2014	Reading	England	Hexagon
4 April 2014	Glasgow	Scotland	Royal Concert Hall
5 April 2014	York	England	Barbican
7 April 2014	Gateshead	England	Sage Hall 1
23 May 2014	Cologne	Germany	E-Werk
11 July 2014	Sesto al Reghena	Italy	Sexto'nplugged Festival
31 July 2014	Copenhagen	Denmark	Tivolis Koncertsal

=== Cancelled shows ===
An Australian Festival Tour was announced in June 2013 but was cancelled on 16 September 2013 due to poor ticket sales of the Harvest Festival. Whilst some of the bands performed a headline tour of Australia instead of the festival, Goldfrapp tweeted that they were unable to tour Australia.

Date	City	Country	Venue
10 November 2013	Melbourne	Australia	Harvest Festival
16 November 2013	Sydney	Australia	Harvest Festival
17 November 2013	Brisbane	Australia	Harvest Festival

=== Box score ===
Venue	City	Tickets Sold / Tickets Available (73%)	Gross (per venue)
Beacon Theatre	New York	2024 / 2789 (73%)	$114,140
TOTAL		2024 / 2789 (73%)	$114,140

== Critical reception ==
Reviews for the tour have all been positive. With The Guardian giving the Manchester show 4/5 stars. Similarly, The Independent gave their Somerset House show 4/5 and acknowledged that the delicate new material may be challenging live, but they "still put on one heck of a show."

== Sold-out shows ==
Eight of the 14 shows sold out. Tickets for London's Somerset House concert sold out very quickly.
