= Live in Belfast =

Live album by Rowan Atkinson
- Released: 1980, re-released 1996
- Recorded: 19–20 September 1980
- Venues: Grand Opera House, Belfast
- Genre: Comedy
- Label: Arista
- Producer: George Nicholson

Rowan Atkinson chronology
Live in Belfast (1980)	Not Just a Pretty Face (1987)

Live in Belfast is a live comedy album by English comedian Rowan Atkinson. It was first released in 1980 as a vinyl LP and cassette tape on Arista Records, then re-released in 1996 on CD.

It was recorded in front of live audiences at two evening performances at the Grand Opera House in Belfast, Northern Ireland, on 19–20 September 1980. The performances were part of a four-month tour of the United Kingdom.

Atkinson was supported by comedy writer Richard Curtis, who appeared doing setups or at the receiving end of jokes, and composer Howard Goodall, who provided musical accompaniment.

The cover photography and design for the album and CD was by Paul Yule.

== Background ==
Rowan Atkinson met Richard Curtis and Howard Goodall at Christ Church, Oxford. The three have collaborated numerous times during their careers. Atkinson's tour occurred between series two and three of the British comedy television programme Not the Nine O'Clock News, for which Atkinson was an actor, Curtis was a writer and Goodall was the music director.

== Comedy in the show ==
The comedy in the show was in the form of sketches and songs. The sketches were written by Rowan Atkinson and Richard Curtis. The song lyrics were written by Richard Curtis and the music was composed by Howard Goodall.

== Personnel ==
- Rowan Atkinson – main character in sketches, lead vocals on "Mary Jane" and "Do Bears Sha la la"
- Richard Curtis – second character in "The Wedding", "Mary Jane", "Senator Brea's Dead", "Impatient Man in Queue Behind Student" and "Joke"
- Howard Goodall – music, vocals on "I Hate the French", backing vocals on "Mary Jane" and "Do Bears Sha la la"

== Track listing ==
Side one

1. "Man in Seat C23" – Rowan Atkinson as the man in seat C23
2. "Sir Marcus Browning M.P." – Atkinson as the announcer and Sir Marcus Browning, MP
3. "Mary Jane" – Richard Curtis as the announcer, Atkinson as Will "Nigger-hater" Bowen and Howard Goodall as Peterson
4. "The Wedding a. The Vicar" – Curtis as Gerald and Atkinson as the vicar
5. "The Wedding b. The Best Man" – Curtis as the announcer and Atkinson as the best man
6. "The Wedding c. The Father of the Bride" – Curtis as the announcer and Atkinson as the father of the bride
7. "I Hate the French" – Goodall as the French-hating singer
8. "Interval Announcement" – Atkinson as the announcer

Side two

1. "Do Bears Sha la la" – Atkinson as the American singer and Goodall as the backing vocalist
2. "Senator Brea's Dead" – Atkinson as the first American and Curtis as the second American
3. "The Devil" – Atkinson as the Devil (a.k.a. Toby)
4. "Impatient Man in Queue Behind Student" – Curtis as the student and Atkinson as the impatient man
5. "Station Announcement" – Atkinson as the impatient man and the announcer
6. "Joke" – Atkinson as the joke-teller and Curtis as the joke-receiver
