= Richard Curtis =

British screenwriter, producer and director (born 1956)

Richard Curtis CBE
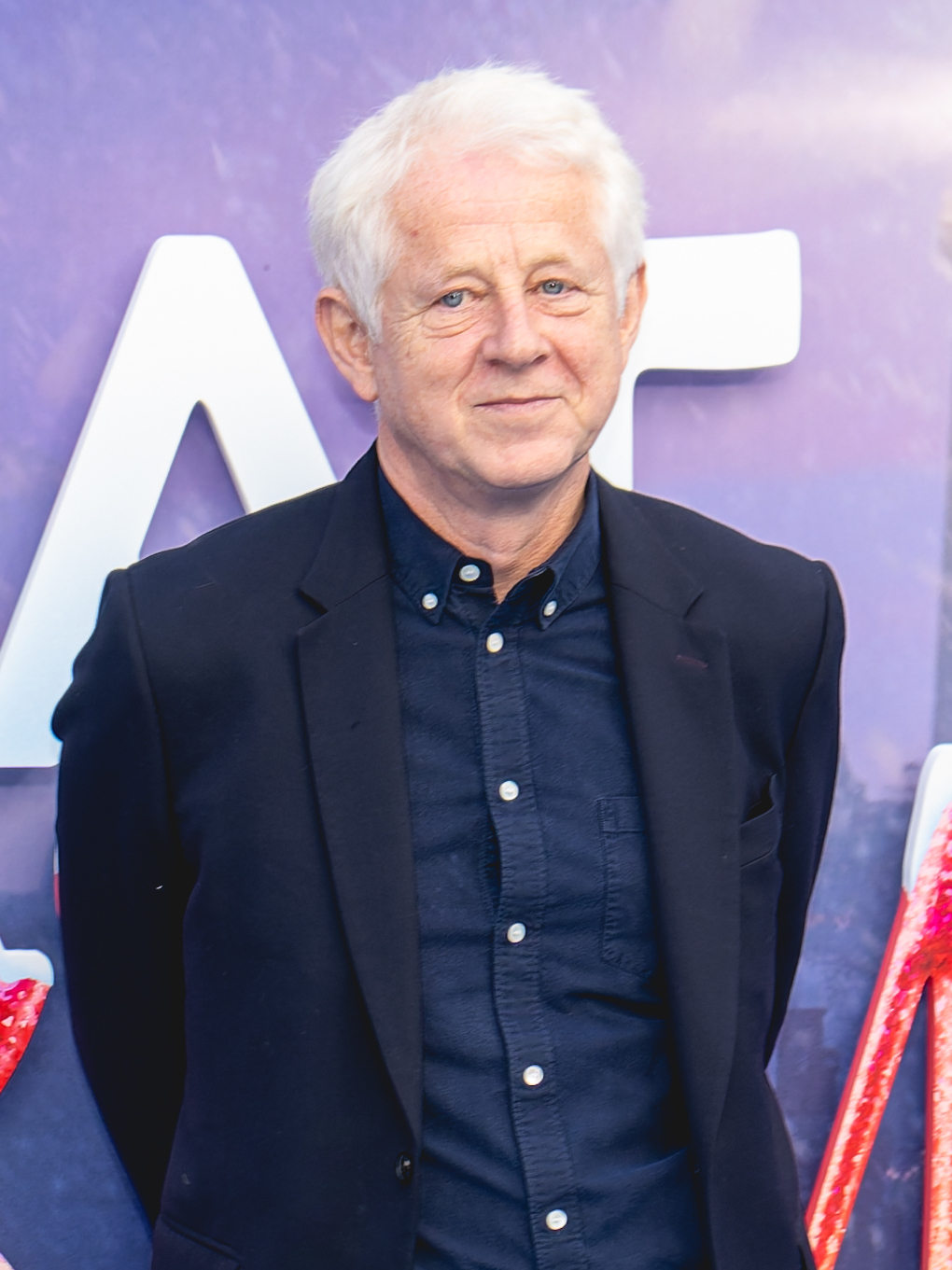
- Curtis at the 2024 BFI London Film Festival premiere of That Christmas
- Born: Richard Whalley Anthony Curtis; 8 November 1956 (age 70); Wellington, New Zealand
- Citizenship: United Kingdom
- Education: University of Oxford (BA)
- Occupations: Screenwriter; producer; director
- Spouse: Emma Freud (m. 2023)
- Children: 4, including Scarlett Curtis
- Writing career
- Period: 1979–present

Richard Whalley Anthony Curtis (born 8 November 1956) is a British screenwriter, producer and director. One of Britain's most successful comedy screenwriters, he is known for romantic comedy-drama films, including Four Weddings and a Funeral (1994), Notting Hill (1999), Bridget Jones's Diary (2001), Love Actually (2003), Bridget Jones: The Edge of Reason (2004), About Time (2013) and Yesterday (2019), as well as the war drama film War Horse (2011), and for having co-written the sitcoms Blackadder, Mr. Bean and The Vicar of Dibley. His early career saw him write material for the comedy sketch shows Not the Nine O'Clock News and Spitting Image.

In 2007, Curtis received the BAFTA Fellowship for lifetime achievement from the British Academy of Film and Television Arts. He is the co-founder, with Lenny Henry, of the British charity Comic Relief, which has raised over £1 billion. At the 2008 Britannia Awards, he received the BAFTA Humanitarian Award for co-creating Comic Relief and for his contributions to other charitable causes. In 2024, he received the Jean Hersholt Humanitarian Award from the Academy of Motion Picture Arts and Sciences.

Curtis was listed in The Observer as one of the 50 funniest figures in British comedy in 2003. In 2008, he was ranked number 12 in a list of the "100 most powerful people in British culture" compiled by The Telegraph. In 2012, he was one of the British cultural icons selected by artist Peter Blake to appear in a new version of his most famous artwork—the cover of the Beatles' 1967 album Sgt. Pepper's Lonely Hearts Club Band.

== Early life and education ==
Curtis was born in Wellington, New Zealand. He is the son of Glyness S. and Anthony J. Curtis. His father was a Czechoslovak Jewish refugee who moved to Australia when aged 13 and became an executive at Unilever. Curtis and his family lived in several different countries during his childhood, including Sweden and the Philippines, before moving to the United Kingdom when he was 11.

Curtis attended Papplewick School in Ascot, Berkshire (as did his younger brother Jamie). For a short period in the 1970s, he lived in Warrington, Cheshire, where he attended Appleton Grammar School (now Bridgewater High School). He lived at Merricourt on Windmill Lane, Appleton, Warrington, during this time. His university friend Rowan Atkinson was an occasional visitor to the house.

Curtis then won a scholarship to Harrow School, where he joined the editorial team of The Harrovian, the weekly school magazine, and this, he asserts, is "where I learned all the skills that made me a sketch writer. I did reviews, comment pieces and funny articles where I'd try to conjure something out of nothing." While at Harrow, he directed a school performance of Joe Orton's play The Erpingham Camp; this controversial choice was given the 'green light' by his classics master, James Morwood. Curtis later commented that Morwood's support had helped him understand that it was all right "to push boundaries and to be funny". Curtis did not approve of fagging at the school, and at 18, when he became head of his house, he banned it.

While at the University of Oxford, Curtis met and began working with Rowan Atkinson, both joining the scriptwriting team of the Etceteras revue, part of the Experimental Theatre Club. In May 1976, in his first year as an undergraduate, he appeared in the company's "After Eights" revue at the Oxford Playhouse. From Christ Church, Oxford, Curtis graduated BA in English Language and Literature with first-class honours.

== Early writing career ==
Collaborating with Rowan Atkinson in The Oxford Revue, he appeared alongside him at his breakthrough Edinburgh Fringe show. As a result, he was commissioned to co-write the BBC Radio 3 series The Atkinson People with Atkinson in 1978, which was broadcast in 1979. He then began to write comedy for film and TV. He was a regular writer on the BBC comedy series Not the Nine O'Clock News, where he wrote many of the show's satirical sketches, often with Rowan Atkinson. Curtis co-wrote with Philip Pope for the Hee Bee Gee Bees' song "Meaningless Songs (In Very High Voices)", released in 1980, to parody the style of a series of the Bee Gees' disco hits. In 1984 and 1985, Curtis wrote material for ITV's satirical puppet show Spitting Image.

First with Atkinson and later with Ben Elton, Curtis then wrote the Blackadder series from 1983 to 1989, each series focusing on a different era in British history. Atkinson played the lead throughout, but Curtis was the only writer who participated in every episode of Blackadder. The pair continued their collaboration with the comedy series Mr. Bean, which ran from 1990 to 1995.

Curtis had by then already begun writing feature films. His first was The Tall Guy (1989), a romantic comedy starring Jeff Goldblum, Emma Thompson and Rowan Atkinson and produced by Working Title films. The TV movie Bernard and the Genie followed in 1991.

In 1994, Curtis created and co-wrote The Vicar of Dibley for comedian Dawn French, which was a great success. In an online poll conducted in 2004 for Britain's Best Sitcom, it was voted the third-best sitcom in British history and Blackadder the second-best, making Curtis the only screenwriter to create two shows in the poll's top 10 programmes.

== Film career ==
Curtis achieved his breakthrough film success with the romantic comedy Four Weddings and a Funeral. The 1994 film, starring Hugh Grant and Andie MacDowell, was produced on a limited budget by the British production company Working Title Films. Curtis chose Mike Newell to direct the film after watching his TV film Ready When You Are, Mr. McGill. Four Weddings and a Funeral proved to be the top-grossing British film in history at that time. It made an international star of Grant, and Curtis' Oscar nomination for the script catapulted him to prominence (though the Oscar went to Quentin Tarantino and Roger Avary for Pulp Fiction). The film was also nominated for Best Picture, but lost to Forrest Gump.

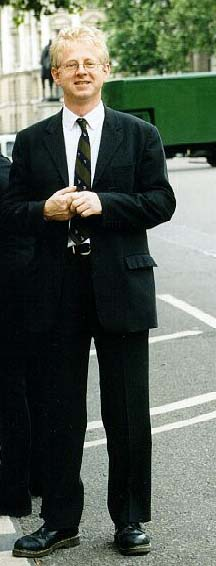
Curtis in London, 1999, the year Notting Hill was released

Curtis' next film was also for Working Title, which has remained his artistic home ever since. 1997's Bean brought Mr. Bean to the big screen and was a huge hit around the world. He continued his association with Working Title writing the 1999 romantic comedy Notting Hill, starring Hugh Grant and Julia Roberts, which broke the record set by Four Weddings and a Funeral to become the top-grossing British film. The story of a lonely travel bookstore owner who falls in love with the world's most famous movie star was directed by Roger Michell.

Curtis next co-wrote the screen adaptation of the international bestseller Bridget Jones's Diary for Working Title. Curtis knew the novel's writer Helen Fielding and has credited her with saying that his original script for Four Weddings and a Funeral was too upbeat and needed the addition of the titular funeral.

Two years later, Curtis re-teamed with Working Title to write and direct Love Actually. Curtis has said in interviews that the sprawling, multi-character structure of Love Actually owes a debt to his favourite film, Robert Altman's Nashville. The film featured a large ensemble cast of prominent UK actors, including Grant, Colin Firth, Bill Nighy, Emma Thompson, Liam Neeson, Andrew Lincoln, Alan Rickman and Keira Knightley, in a loosely connected series of stories about people in and out of love in London in the weeks leading up to Christmas. Its regular festive screening has seen it labelled as being arguably a modern-day Christmas staple.

Curtis followed this in 2004 with work as co-writer on Bridget Jones: The Edge of Reason, the sequel to Bridget Jones's Diary. Curtis then wrote the screenplay to The Girl in the Café, a television film directed by David Yates and produced by the BBC and HBO as part of the Make Poverty History campaign's Live 8 efforts in 2005. The film stars Bill Nighy as a civil servant and Kelly Macdonald as a young woman he falls in love with at a fictional G8 summit in Iceland. Macdonald's character pushes him to ask whether the developed countries of the world cannot do more to help the most impoverished. The film was timed to air just before the Gleneagles G8 summit in 2005. It received three Emmy Awards in 2006, including Outstanding Made for Television Movie, Supporting Actress in a Miniseries or a Movie for Kelly Macdonald and a Primetime Emmy Award for Outstanding Writing for a Miniseries, Movie or a Dramatic Special trophy for Curtis himself. Curtis said of Yates' direction that he made "a much more beautiful film, and a surprising film and a better film than I could possibly have made."

"The difference between having a good idea for a movie and a finished movie is the same as seeing a pretty girl across the floor at a party and being there when she gives birth to your third child... It's a very long journey."

— Curtis speaking in 2013 on the filmmaking process.

In May 2007, he received the BAFTA Fellowship at the British Academy Television Awards in recognition of his successful career in film and television and his charity efforts. Curtis next co-wrote with Anthony Minghella an adaptation of Alexander McCall Smith's novel, The No. 1 Ladies' Detective Agency, which Minghella shot in mid-2007 in Botswana. It premiered on the BBC on 23 March 2008, just days after Minghella's death. The film did not run in the US until early 2009, when HBO aired it as the pilot of a resulting six-episode TV series with the same cast, on which Curtis served as executive producer.

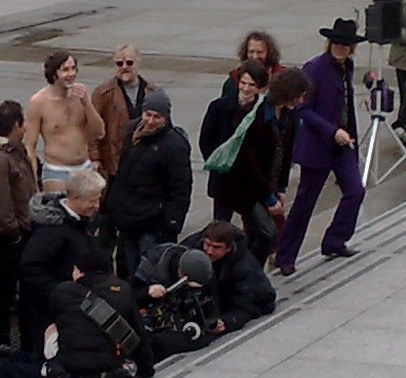
Curtis (bottom) during filming The Boat That Rocked in Trafalgar Square, London in May 2009

His second film as writer/director, The Boat That Rocked, was released in 2009. The film was set in 1966 in the era of British pirate radio. It followed a group of DJs on a pirate radio station run from a boat in the North Sea. The film starred Philip Seymour Hoffman, Bill Nighy, Nick Frost, Rhys Ifans, Gemma Arterton and Kenneth Branagh. The film was a commercial and critical disappointment in the UK. Curtis re-edited the film for its US release where it was re-titled Pirate Radio, but also failed to find an audience. He followed that with War Horse, which he rewrote for director Steven Spielberg based on an earlier script by playwright Lee Hall. Curtis was recommended to Spielberg by DreamWorks Studio executive Stacey Snider, who had worked with Curtis during her time at Universal Studios. Curtis's work on the World War I-set Blackadder Goes Forth meant he was already familiar with the period.. The movie War Horse was a modest commercial success.

Curtis then wrote Mary and Martha, a BBC/HBO television film directed by Phillip Noyce. The film starred Hilary Swank and Brenda Blethyn as two women who bond after they both lose their sons to malaria. The film was broadcast in the UK on 1 March 2013. He next wrote and directed About Time, a romantic comedy/drama about time travel and family love. It starred Rachel McAdams, Domhnall Gleeson, Bill Nighy, Tom Hollander, Margot Robbie, Lydia Wilson and Vanessa Kirby. It was released in the UK on 4 September 2013. Soon after the film came out, Curtis delivered a screenwriting lecture as part of the BAFTA and BFI Screenwriters' Lecture Series. He followed that with Trash, which he adapted from the novel by Andy Mulligan for director Stephen Daldry. With three unknown Brazilian children in the lead roles, the film co-starred Wagner Moura, Rooney Mara and Martin Sheen. It was filmed in 2013 in Rio de Janeiro and released in Brazil on 9 October 2014 and in the UK on 30 January 2015.

He next wrote Roald Dahl's Esio Trot, a BBC television film adaptation of Roald Dahl's classic children's novel. Receiving acclaim, the film starred Dustin Hoffman and Judi Dench, with James Corden as the narrator, was directed by Dearbhla Walsh and was broadcast on BBC on 1 January 2015. His next film, Yesterday, was adapted from an original screenplay by Jack Barth (who received only "co-story" credit, reportedly at Curtis's insistence). The film, directed by Danny Boyle and starring Lily James and Himesh Patel, follows a young man who discovers that the entire world except for him has no memory of the Beatles, allowing him to become a global pop star by performing their songs as his own. While Barth's original screenplay depicted an obscure musician unable to capitalise on his windfall, Curtis's more conventional script featured an independent musician unable to control his own career once the music industry takes over. It began filming on 21 April 2018 and was released on 28 June 2019.

== Campaigning ==
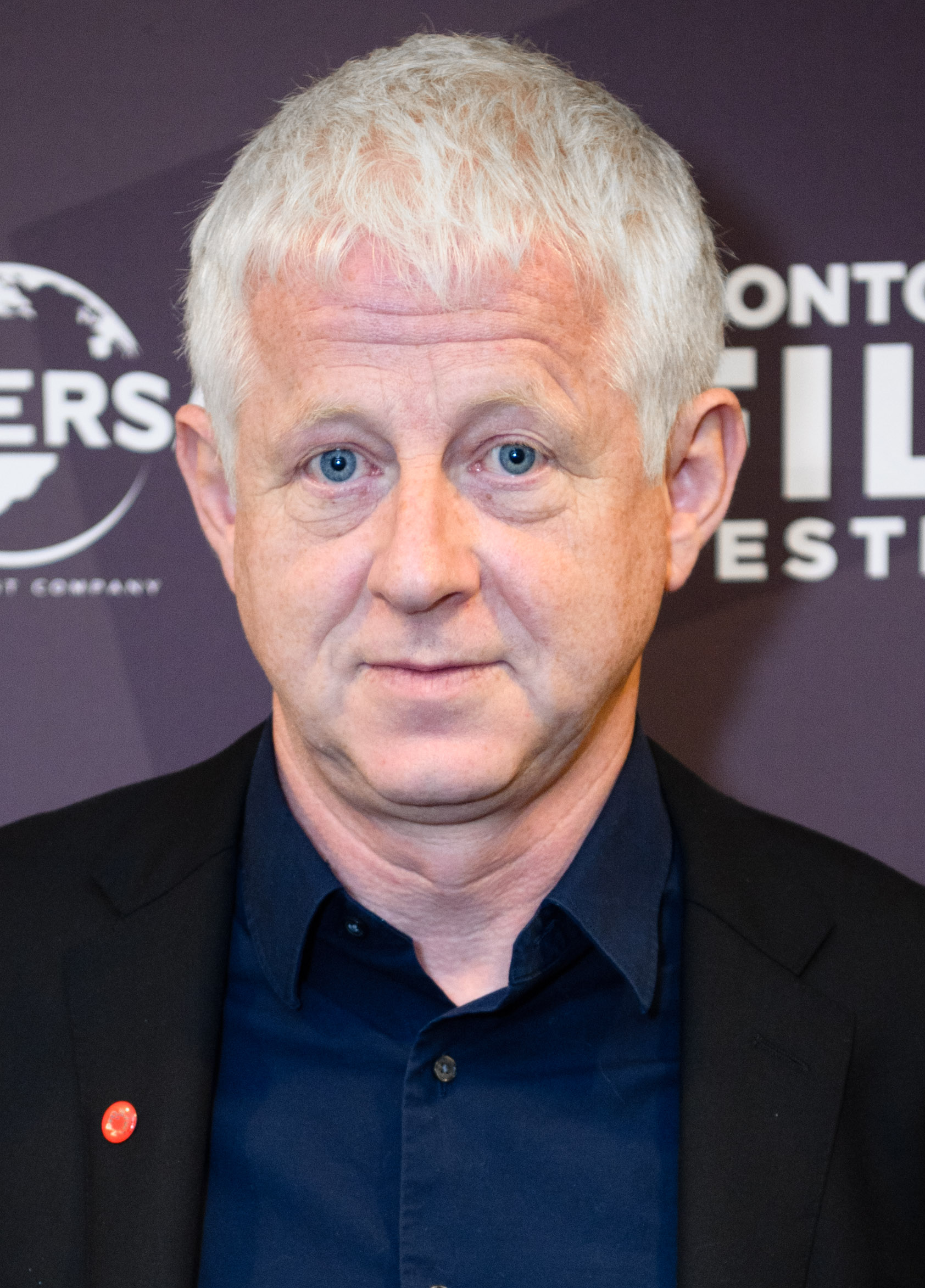
Curtis at Montclair Film Festival in 2016

Curtis and Lenny Henry are co-founders and co-creators of Comic Relief. He is also a founder of Make Poverty History. He organised the Live 8 concerts with Bob Geldof to publicise poverty, particularly in Africa, and pressure G8 leaders to adopt his proposals for ending it. He has written of his work in The Observer in the Global development section in 2005.

Curtis helped spearhead the launch of the Robin Hood tax campaign in 2010. The campaign fights for a 0.05% tax levied on each bank trade ranging from shares to foreign exchange and derivatives that could generate $700bn worldwide and be spent on measures to combat domestic and international poverty as well as fight climate change.

In October 2010, a short film created by Curtis titled No Pressure was released by the 10:10 campaign in Britain to promote climate change politics. The film depicted a series of scenes in which people were asked if they were going to participate in the 10:10 campaign, told there was "no pressure" to do so, but if they did not, they were blown up at the press of a red button. Reaction was mixed, but the video was swiftly removed from the organisation's website.

In March 2011, Curtis apologised following a complaint by the British Stammering Association about 2011 Comic Relief's opening skit, a parody by Lenny Henry of the 2010 film The King's Speech.

Curtis talked the producer of American Idol into doing a show wherein celebrities journeyed into Africa and experienced the level of poverty for themselves. It was called American Idol: Idol Gives Back. In 2014, he publicly backed "Hacked Off" and its campaign in support of UK press self-regulation by "safeguarding the press from political interference while also giving vital protection to the vulnerable."

In August 2014, Curtis was one of 200 public figures who were signatories to a letter to The Guardian opposing Scottish independence in the run-up to September's referendum on that issue.

In 2020, Curtis co-founded the climate finance campaign Make My Money Matter. According to Campaign Director David Hayman the campaign "is all about helping people understand the impact of their money and how helping them think that if they are saving for retirement, what kind of retirement is their money saving for? What kind of world is it building?"

In 2021, Curtis joined the Rewriting Extinction campaign to fight the climate and biodiversity crisis through comics. He wrote a comic story in collaboration with War and Peas named "Woke". It was printed in the book The Most Important Comic Book on Earth: Stories to Save the World which was released on 28 October 2021 by DK.

In July 2026, Curtis was among 120 people who wrote an open letter, organised by Patriotic Millionaires, to Prime Minister Andy Burnham, in which they asked to be taxed more.

== Personal life ==
Curtis lives in Notting Hill and has a country house in Walberswick, Suffolk with broadcaster Emma Freud whom he married in September 2023. They have four children, including writer and activist Scarlett. He dated Anne Strutt, now Baroness Jenkin of Kennington, before her marriage to Bernard Jenkin, a Member of Parliament (MP). Curtis has named characters in his writing Bernard (reputedly after Jenkin). It is said he used the Jenkins' wedding as inspiration for Four Weddings and a Funeral. He is irreligious. Richard Curtis has never won an Oscar for his films, but in 2024 he was honoured with an honorary Oscar, the Jean Hersholt Humanitarian Award for his achievements. The Oscar was presented to him with a speech by actor Hugh Grant.

== Works ==
=== Film ===
==== Feature films ====
Year	Title	Director	Writer	Producer	Note
1989	The Tall Guy	No	Yes	No	Feature film debut
1994	Four Weddings and a Funeral	No	Yes	Co-executive producer	
1997	Bean	No	Yes	Executive producer	
1999	Notting Hill	No	Yes	Executive producer	
2001	Bridget Jones's Diary	No	Yes	No	
2003	Love Actually	Yes	Yes	No	Feature film directorial debut
2003	More Great Comedy Moments	No	Yes	No	Direct-to-video film
2004	Bridget Jones: The Edge of Reason	No	Yes	No	
2006	Sixty Six	No	No	Executive producer	
2007	Mr. Bean's Holiday	No	No	Executive producer	
2009	The Boat That Rocked	Yes	Yes	Executive producer	Also known as Pirate Radio in North America
2011	War Horse	No	Yes	No	
2013	About Time	Yes	Yes	Executive producer	
2014	Trash	No	Yes	No	
2018	Mamma Mia! Here We Go Again	No	Story writer	Executive producer	
2019	Yesterday	No	Yes	Yes	
2020	Rising Phoenix	No	No	Executive producer	Documentary film
2023	Genie	No	Yes	Yes	
2024	That Christmas	No	Yes	Executive producer	
2027	Not Alone	No	No	Executive producer	

===== Uncredited acting cameos =====
Year	Title	Role
1989	The Tall Guy	Man Leaving Bathroom
2003	Love Actually	Trombone Player

===== Additional literary material =====
- French & Saunders Live (2000)
- Ticket to Paradise (2022)

==== Short films ====
Year	Title	Writer	Executive producer
1983	Dead on Time	Yes	No
1991	Mr. Bean Takes an Exam	Yes	No
1991	Mr. Bean Goes to a Première	Yes	No
2010	No Pressure	Yes	No
2020	A Cheeky Nativity Poem	Yes	Yes
2020	The Quiz Results Are In!	Yes	Yes
2020	The Vicar's First 'Viral' Sermon	Yes	Yes

===== Acting roles =====
Year	Title	Role
1983	Dead on Time	Customer in Cafe
2024	Something Sketchy	Himself

=== Television ===
==== TV series ====
Year	Title	Creator	Writer	Note
1979–1982	Not the Nine O'Clock News	No	Yes	
1984–1985	Spitting Image	No	Yes	Also a script contributor for 2 episodes
1985–present	Comic Relief	Yes	No	
1990	French and Saunders	No	Yes	Episode: "Episode #3.7"
1990–1995	Mr. Bean	Yes	Yes	Also a script editor for 2 episodes and a script contributor for 3 episodes
1994–2007	The Vicar of Dibley	Yes	Yes	Also a co-executive producer
2007	Casualty	No	Yes	Episode: "Sweet Charity"
2010	Doctor Who	No	Yes	Episode: "Vincent and the Doctor"

===== Composer =====
- The Lenny Henry Show (1998) (Episode: "Episode #2.5")

==== Miniseries ====
Year	Title	Creator	Writer	Executive producer
1983	The Black Adder	Yes	Yes	No
1986	Blackadder II	Yes	Yes	No
1987	Blackadder the Third	Yes	Yes	No
1989	Blackadder Goes Forth	Yes	Yes	No
1997	Balls to Africa: Sporting Noses on Tour	No	No	Yes
2009	The No. 1 Ladies' Detective Agency	Yes	Yes	Yes
2019	Four Weddings and a Funeral	No	No	Yes

===== Additional literary material =====
- Walliams & Friend (2016) (Episode: "Miranda Richardson")

==== TV specials ====
Year	Title	Writer	Executive producer	Note
1989	A Night of Comic Relief 2	Yes	No	
1989	The Robbie Coltrane Special	Yes	No	
1992	Rowan Atkinson Live	Yes	No	
2015	Global Citizen Festival	No	Yes	
2015	Red Nose Day	Yes	Yes	
2017	Comic Relief: Graham Norton's Big Chat Live	No	Yes	
2017	Red Nose Day: Greg Davies' Hot Tub Half Hour	No	Yes	
2017	The Red Nose Day Special	Yes	No	
2019	The United Nations Association 2019 Global Citizen Awards & 12th Annual West Coast Global Forum	Yes	No	Segment: "We The People"
2020	Cinderella: A Comic Relief Pantomime for Christmas	Yes	Yes	

===== Organiser =====
- Live 8 (2005)

===== Additional literary material =====
- One Night with Robbie Williams (2021)

==== TV films ====
Year	Title	Creator	Writer	Executive producer
1988	Blackadder's Christmas Carol	No	Yes	No
1991	Bernard and the Genie	No	Yes	No
1992	Comic Relief: Behind the Nose	No	No	Yes
1995	Oliver 2: Let's Twist Again	No	Yes	No
1999	Comic Relief: Doctor Who – The Curse of Fatal Death	No	No	Yes
1999	Robbie the Reindeer in Hooves of Fire	Yes	Yes	No
2002	Robbie the Reindeer in Legend of the Lost Tribe	Yes	No	Yes
2005	The Girl in the Café	No	Yes	Yes
2007	The Minister of Divine	No	No	Yes
2007	Robbie the Reindeer in Close Encounters of the Herd Kind	Yes	No	No
2008	The No. 1 Ladies' Detective Agency	No	Yes	No
2013	Comic Relief: Red Nose Day 2013	No	Yes	Yes
2013	Mary and Martha	No	Yes	No
2015	Esio Trot	No	Yes	Yes
2016	Red Nose Day	No	Yes	No
2018	The Red Nose Day Special	No	Yes	No

===== Additional literary material =====
- Hysteria 2! (1989)
- A Royal Birthday Celebration (1998)

==== Short films ====
Year	Title	Creator	Director	Writer
1982	The Black Adder	Yes	No	Yes
1984	Madness the Pilot	No	No	Yes
1988	Blackadder: The Cavalier Years	No	No	Yes
1999	Blackadder: Back & Forth	No	No	Yes
2017	Red Nose Day Actually	No	Yes	Yes
2019	Comic Relief: Mamma Mia! Here We Go Yet Again	No	No	Yes
2019	One Red Nose Day and a Wedding	No	No	Yes
2023	Baldrick's Bedtime Stories	No	No	Yes

=== Music videos ===
Year	Title	Director	Executive producer
2011	Take That & Fake That: Happy Now	Yes	Yes
2024	Ed Sheeran: Under the Tree	Yes	No

=== Radio ===
Year	Title	Writer	Actor
1979	The Atkinson People	Yes	No
2021	Dinner with Dylan	Story writer	Yes

=== Theatre ===
- The Skinhead Hamlet (1981) (Writer)
- Christmas Actually (2023) (Presenter)

=== Songs ===
Year	Title	Writer	Lyricist
1980	"Meaningless Songs (In Very High Voices)"	Co-writer	No
1980	"I Hate the French"	No	Yes

== Awards and nominations ==
Year	Award	Category	Work	Result
1990	British Academy Television Award	Best Comedy (Programme or Series)	Blackadder Goes Forth	Won
1992	British Academy Television Award	Best Comedy (Programme or Series)	The Curse of Mr. Bean	Nominated
1995	Academy Award	Best Original Screenplay	Four Weddings and a Funeral	Nominated
1995	British Academy Film Award	Best Original Screenplay	Four Weddings and a Funeral	Nominated
1995	Writers Guild of America Award	Best Original Screenplay	Four Weddings and a Funeral	Won
1995	Golden Globe Award	Best Screenplay	Four Weddings and a Funeral	Nominated
1998	British Academy Television Award	Best Comedy (Programme or Series)	The Vicar of Dibley	Nominated
1999	British Academy Television Award	Best Comedy (Programme or Series)	The Vicar of Dibley	Nominated
2002	British Academy Film Award	Best Adapted Screenplay	Bridget Jones's Diary	Nominated
2002	Writers Guild of America Award	Best Adapted Screenplay	Bridget Jones's Diary	Nominated
2004	Golden Globe Award	Best Screenplay	Love Actually	Nominated
2004	British Academy Film Award	Outstanding British Film	Love Actually	Nominated
2004	Discoverer Screenwriting Award	Best Screenplay	Love Actually	Nominated
2005	Primetime Emmy Award	Outstanding Made for Television Movie	The Girl in the Café	Won
2005	Primetime Emmy Award	Outstanding Writing for a Miniseries, Movie or a Dramatic Special	The Girl in the Café	Won
2007	British Academy Film Award	Academy Fellowship		Won
2020	Global Citizen Prize Award	Global Citizen of the Year		Won
2025	Academy Award	Jean Hersholt Humanitarian Award		Honored
