= The Atkinson People =

1979 BBC radio comedy series

- Country of origin: United Kingdom
- Home station: Radio 3

The Atkinson People is a 1979 BBC radio comedy series. The series, which was first broadcast sporadically in 1979 by the BBC's arts radio station Radio 3, features a satirical profile of a fictional famous person each week.

It is notable as being the first radio or television programme to star comedian and actor Rowan Atkinson. The programme was written by Atkinson and Richard Curtis and produced by future Not the Nine O'Clock News co-star Griff Rhys Jones, then a BBC Radio Comedy producer. In most cases, Atkinson played the lead characters, with other voices provided by Hugh Thomas and Peter Wilson. Following the precedent set by The Hitchhiker's Guide to the Galaxy, the series was also an early adopter of stereophonic sound; it was recorded in 1978, and broadcast in 1979. The series has been repeated on BBC Radio 7 and its successor BBC Radio 4 Extra, and was picked by Armando Iannucci during his stint as "comedy controller".

== Episodes ==
	Title	Transmission date
1	Sir Corin Basin	24 April 1979
Actor, raconteur and acknowledged dullard Sir Corin Basin takes us on an aural tour of his productions.
2	Sir Benjamin Fletcher	28 April 1979
Master orator Sir Benjamin Fletcher discusses his life and opinions.
3	George Dupont	30 April 1979
French thinker and philosopher George Dupont is an elusive figure, and remains so after this documentary.
4	Barry Good	2 November 1979
Pop artiste Barry Good.
