= No Pressure (2010 film) =

- Promotional banner for No Pressure displayed on the 10:10 website prior to the film's release
- Directed by: Dougal Wilson
- Written by: Richard Curtis and Franny Armstrong
- Produced by: 10:10
- Starring: Lyndsey Marshal; Gillian Anderson; David Ginola; Peter Crouch; Paul Ritter
- Music by: Radiohead
- Release date: 1 October 2010
- Running time: 4 minutes
- Country: United Kingdom
- Language: English
- Budget: £0 (Volunteer-produced)

No Pressure is a 2010 short film produced by the global warming mitigation campaign 10:10, written by Richard Curtis and Franny Armstrong, and directed by Dougal Wilson. Intended for cinema and television advertisements, No Pressure is composed of scenes in which a variety of men, women and children in every-day situations are graphically blown to pieces for failing to be sufficiently enthusiastic about the 10:10 campaign to reduce CO_{2} emissions. The film's makers said that they viewed No Pressure as "a funny and satirical tongue-in-cheek little film in the over-the-top style of Monty Python or South Park". Before its release, The Guardian described it as "attention-grabbing" and "pretty edgy."

The film was withdrawn from public circulation by 10:10, on the same day it was released, due to negative publicity. Charities that had backed the film stated they were "absolutely appalled" upon seeing it, and several of 10:10's corporate and strategic partners withdrew from partnership.

== Background and production ==
The film was made in an attempt to challenge the "no pressure" attitude often displayed both by governments and individuals towards taking real action on climate change. 10:10 highlighted the urgency of action with claims that carbon dioxide emissions must be stabilised by 2014 (within four years) in order to avoid disaster, and that "300,000 real people" are already killed by climate change annually. Lizzie Gillet, 10:10 global campaign director, explained: "With climate change becoming increasingly threatening, and decreasingly talked about in the media, we wanted to find a way to bring this critical issue back into the headlines while making people laugh. We were therefore delighted when Richard Curtis agreed to write a short film for the 10:10 campaign".

Doing nothing about climate change is still a fairly common affliction, even in this day and age. What to do with those people, who are together threatening everybody's existence on this planet? Clearly we don't really think they should be blown up, that's just a joke for the mini-movie, but maybe a little amputating would be a good place to start?

— Franny Armstrong, founder of 10:10

Work began on the film as late as August 2010, with 10:10's website posting a casting call for extras on the 26th; it mentioned that Richard Curtis had written it and described it as something that would "promote carbon cutting in a completely new, exciting, and eyebrow-raising way", but said the rest of the details were secret.

The film was shot on a location at Camden School for Girls, in the London Borough of Camden in North London, along with White City in West London. According to 10:10, over 50 film professionals and more than 40 actors and extras provided their services at no cost.

== Synopsis ==
The four-minute film consists of a series of short scenes in which groups of people are asked if they are interested in participating in the 10:10 project to reduce carbon emissions. Those failing to show enthusiasm for the cause are gruesomely blown to pieces.

In the first scene, a bright and chirpy schoolteacher, played by Lyndsey Marshal, tells her class about the 10:10 campaign, and asks what they are doing to reduce their carbon footprint. She asks which students are planning to participate; most raise their hands, but two children shrug apathetically. The teacher reassures them that this is "fine, it's absolutely fine, it's your choice" and there is "no pressure", but then shifts the papers on her desk to reveal a red-buttoned detonator, which she presses. The two children who did not want to participate explode, covering their screaming classmates with blood and body parts. The blood-spattered teacher then goes on casually to explain the night's homework to her horrified charges.

The second scene shows a group of white-collar workers in an office meeting. The office manager, played by Paul Ritter, similarly explains the purpose of the 10:10 campaign, and asks who will be participating. While most raise their hands, four raise their hands unconvinced. The manager reassures them that there is "no pressure" to participate, but he is then handed a detonator by an assistant, which he uses to blow up the four workers, splattering appalled co-workers with gore.

The third scene is set on a football pitch during team training. The coach, played by David Ginola, asks the players to explain the 10:10 campaign that the team is participating in. They describe a range of energy-saving measures which have been implemented by the team and its fans. However, the coach remains unmoved, remarking the campaign would distract him from football. A player tells him that there's "no pressure", produces a detonator, and blows him up. Unlike the witnesses depicted in previous scenes, the team is not at all surprised, and casually jogs away to resume training.

A brief interlude with captions explains the campaign, accompanied by the song "Weird Fishes / Arpeggi" by Radiohead. In the final scene, the actress Gillian Anderson is finishing the voice-over for the interlude just seen. The sound engineer asks her what she is planning to do to cut her carbon footprint. Anderson irritably remarks that she thought providing the recording was a sufficient contribution. The sound engineer repeats the film's catchphrase, "no pressure", and detonates Anderson before picking up to leave. The film ends with a shot of Anderson's gory remains sliding down the sound-booth window with the text "Cut your carbon by 10%. No pressure."

== Reception ==
Upon its release, No Pressure provoked an immediate negative reaction in the media, and the resulting controversy became widely referred to as "splattergate" by bloggers.

In The Daily Telegraph, James Delingpole wrote that the film was an "ugly, counterproductive eco-propaganda movie" and that "with No Pressure, the environmental movement has revealed the snarling, wicked, homicidal misanthropy beneath its cloak of gentle, bunny-hugging righteousness". The ConservativeHome website described it as "crass, tasteless and unfunny as it gets", while Melanie Phillips in The Spectator commented on the intended humorous aspect of the film by writing that "The joke was only about blowing dissenters to bits and raining their flesh down on terrified people. Because exterminating human beings is acceptable to greens as a joke. From which we can only assume at best indifference towards and at worst a profound loathing of the human condition".

American environmentalist and writer Bill McKibben lamented the film on the Climate Progress website, where he wrote "The climate skeptics can crow. It's the kind of stupidity that hurts our side, reinforcing in people's minds a series of preconceived notions, not the least of which is that we're out-of-control and out of touch—not to mention off the wall, and also with completely misplaced sense of humor". McKibben added "There's no question that crap like this will cast a shadow, for a time, over our efforts and everyone else who's working on global warming. McKibben subsequently withdrew as an organisational partner of 10:10.

In The Independent, Dominic Lawson wrote "As often as 10:10 tried to pull the film off YouTube, their critics re-posted it. This, at least, proves what a cataclysmic misjudgement Curtis had made. When you try to satirise the critics of your campaign, and it turns out that those very critics embrace your film as demonstrating exactly what they find unbearable about the climate-obsessed eco-lobby, then you know that you have kicked the ball into your own net".

The film generated a huge reaction in the blogosphere. One comment to The Guardian read: "To suggest that people who disagree with you deserve to die is incredibly stupid. Imagine if some Christian group in the US did that to gays, Muslims or anyone else they disagree with. The outrage would be palpable. And deserved."

The Guardian, which was a key collaborator with the 10:10 campaign since its launch and got exclusive rights to show the film première, responded to the criticism by stating that "the film may have been somewhat tasteless, but it was an imaginative attempt to challenge public apathy over climate change". This statement originally ended "and, highly unusually for attempts to communicate about this subject, funny too", but this was later redacted. A later report in the newspaper by Adam Vaughan said that the film, "intended as a tongue-in-cheek spoof of hectoring greens", had created a huge amount of global coverage for 10:10, in print and on the web. The report said that while many people had found the film hilarious, there was a "predictable slating from climate sceptics" as well as furious reactions from some environmentalists. The report also went on to describe other, more reflective responses, which had focused on effective communication, psychology, satire, and ways of engaging with various audiences over climate change.

== Withdrawal ==
Although originally planned to be shown in cinema and television advertisements, 10:10 removed the film from their website and YouTube later on 1 October 2010. On Friday 2 October, 10:10 placed a notice on their website saying, "Many people found the resulting film extremely funny, but unfortunately some didn't and we sincerely apologise to anybody we have offended. [...] At 10:10 we're all about trying new and creative ways of getting people to take action on climate change. Unfortunately in this instance we missed the mark. Oh well, we live and learn." This was criticised as a non-apology apology by Michelle Malkin in the Litchfield County Register and Andrew Revkin in an opinion piece in The New York Times. A spokesman for 10:10 also denied that the withdrawal had been planned from the beginning in order to generate publicity. After removing the video from YouTube, 10:10 issued a statement: "We won't be making any attempt to censor or remove other versions currently in circulation on the internet". Then, on Monday 5 October 10:10 director Eugenie Harvey issued a second, more comprehensive apology, stating: "We are... sorry to our corporate sponsors, delivery partners and board members, who have been implicated in this situation despite having no involvement in the film's production or release."

ActionAid, a charity which co-ordinates a schools programme with 10:10, approved the decision to withdraw the film, and stated "Our job is to encourage proactive decisions at class level to reduce carbon emissions. We did it because evidence shows children are deeply concerned about climate change and because we see the impacts of it in the developing world where a lot of our work is. So we think the 10:10 campaign is very important, but the moment this film was seen it was clear it was inappropriate."

In the wake of the film's withdrawal, Richard Curtis admitted that the attempt to draw attention to the cause of lowering CO_{2} emissions may have backfired. Curtis said "When you try to be funny on a serious subject, it's obviously risky. I hope people who don't like the little film will still think about the big issue and try to do something about it."

=== Withdrawal of sponsors ===
Several sponsors withdrew their support of 10:10 as a result of the No Pressure film. Nick Sharples, Sony Europe's Director of Communications, issued a statement saying, "we strongly condemn the No Pressure video which was conceived, produced and released by 10:10 entirely without the knowledge or involvement of Sony", and cutting ties with 10:10: "As a result we have taken the decision to disassociate ourselves from 10:10 at this time". Kyocera and Eaga were removed from the list of 10:10 sponsors, and National Magazine Company was removed from the list of 10:10 media partners. At the same time, a spokesman for O2, a partner of 10:10, refused to disassociate itself from the group: "10:10 is an independent organisation and we don't ask for editorial control over the content of its campaigns."

350.org, with whom 10:10 had been collaborating on the 10 October 2010 day of action, broke all current and future relations with 10:10. In a press release, they said: "We respect 10:10's previous work to encourage companies, schools, and churches to voluntarily cut their carbon emissions 10%. Upon seeing the video, however, we have informed 10:10 that we can no longer remain partners on 10 October 2010 or any other initiative. 350.org maintains an absolute commitment to nonviolence in word and deed".

== See also ==
- Individual and political action on climate change
- Climate change mitigation
- Graphic violence
