= A&E (song) =

2008 single by Goldfrapp

Single by Goldfrapp

from the album Seventh Tree
- Released: 11 February 2008
- Recorded: 2007
- Genre: Folktronica; dream pop; synth-pop
- Length: 3:19
- Label: Mute
- Songwriters: Alison Goldfrapp; Will Gregory
- Producers: Alison Goldfrapp; Will Gregory; Flood (co.)

Goldfrapp singles chronology
"Satin Boys, Flaming Chic" (2006)	"A&E" (2008)	"Happiness" (2008)

"A&E" is a song by English electronic music duo Goldfrapp from their fourth studio album, Seventh Tree (2008). The song was written and produced by Alison Goldfrapp and Will Gregory, with co-production handled by Flood. It was released as the album's lead single on 11 February 2008.

== Background and writing ==
"A&E" was composed as a collaborative effort between Alison Goldfrapp and Will Gregory in 2007 in a recording studio near Somerset, England. Its lyrics were inspired by Goldfrapp's visit to the emergency department of a hospital on a Saturday afternoon. The doctors "pumped [her] up with loads of painkillers" and she described the situation as a "bit surreal."

Writing for Pitchfork, Matthew Perpetua interpreted the song's storyline as "showcase for both her lyrical and vocal strengths...from the perspective of an incredibly lonely woman driven to a suicide attempt while waiting around for a phone call from a man she's not even sure she likes."

In 2023, Goldfrapp commented "it’s so autobiographical. It’s not fantastical at all, it’s kind of [about] what happened. You know, I was in A&E in a hospital gown having a bit of a meltdown. So it does feel slightly odd now when I sing it."

== Critical reception ==
"A&E" received positive reviews from music critics. John Murphy of musicOMH called the song "a beautifully paced ballad, with a memorable hook [...] which buries its way into your head after just a couple of listens". Digital Spy reviewer Nick Levine described "A&E" as "lush, folky and [...] organic" and wrote that Goldfrapp's vocals were "full of longing and slow-burning sexuality". Popjustice described the song as "fucking brilliant". Alex Denney of Drowned in Sound was less impressed, writing that "the sparks [...] fail to fly".

The song appeared at number 73 on Pitchfork's "The 100 Best Tracks of 2008" list.

== Commercial performance ==
"A&E" debuted at number 18 on the UK Singles Chart for the week ending 16 February 2008. The following week the song reached its peak position at number 10 and spent nine weeks on the chart. Elsewhere, the track saw modest chart success. "A&E" debuted and peaked at number 33 on the Irish Singles Chart, while reaching number 38 in Belgium, number 85 in Australia number 98 in Germany.

The single reached number 65 on the European Hot 100 Singles chart. It also reached number 12 on the Euro Digital Tracks chart and number 14 on the Euro Digital Songs chart. In the United States, "A&E" reached number one on the Billboard Hot Dance Singles Sales chart and number two on Hot Singles Sales chart.

== Music video ==
The music video for "A&E" was directed by Dougal Wilson which, in sharp contrast to the song's hospital theming, is more nature-themed. The video is set in a forest and opens with Goldfrapp in a white dress lying in a clearing, looking up at the camera. She is soon joined by several leaf-men who dance around her as she sings. Midway through the video, day turns into night and Goldfrapp is joined by several woodland creatures. The video concludes with Gregory playing a guitar and making tea beside an orange tent.

The video premiered on 12 January 2008 on Channel 4 in the United Kingdom. In a review for Drowned in Sound, Alex Denney described the video as "weird" and compared it to music videos by Kate Bush and The Mighty Boosh. Pitchfork reviewer Marc Hogan wrote that the video was a "good fit for Goldfrapp's bright, folksy turn" and praised its "twist ending".

== Track listings ==
- CD single 1
1. "A&E" – 3:16
2. "Clowns" (Super 8 film) – 4:10
- CD single 2
1. "A&E" – 3:19
2. "A&E" (Gui Boratto Remix) – 7:02
3. "A&E" (Gui Boratto Dub) – 7:20
4. "A&E" (Hercules and Love Affair Remix) – 7:07
- 7-inch limited picture disc
1. "A&E" – 3:19
2. "A&E" (Maps Instrumental Mix) – 5:36
- Digital single (2019)
1. "A&E" – 3:18
2. "A&E" (Maps Remix) – 5:35
3. "A&E" (Maps Instrumental Mix) – 5:34
4. "A&E" (Gui Boratto Remix) – 7:02
5. "A&E" (Gui Boratto Dub) – 7:20
6. "A&E" (Hercules & Love Affair Remix) – 7:06

== Personnel ==
Credits adapted from the liner notes of Seventh Tree.

Goldfrapp

- Alison Goldfrapp – production, recording, vocals
- Will Gregory – production, recording

Additional personnel

- Nick Batt – additional drum programming
- Steve Evans – acoustic guitar
- Flood – co-production, guitar, keyboards, mixing
- Tony Hoffer – overdub engineering
- Serge Leblon – photography
- Stephen Marcussen – mastering
- Justin Meldal-Johnsen – bass
- Bill Mims – overdub engineering
- Ruth Wall – harp samples
- Denny Weston Jr. – drums

== Charts ==
=== Weekly charts ===
Chart (2008)	Peak position
Australia (ARIA)	85
Belgium (Ultratop 50 Flanders)	38
Europe (European Hot 100 Singles)	65
Germany (GfK)	98
Ireland (IRMA)	33
Scottish Singles Sales (Official Charts)	7
UK Singles (Official Charts)	10
US Dance Club Songs (Billboard)	22
US Dance Singles Sales (Billboard)	1
US Hot Singles Sales (Billboard)	2

=== Year-end charts ===
Chart (2008)	Position
UK Singles (OCC)	157
