= Caravan Girl =

Single by Goldfrapp

from the album Seventh Tree
- Released: 30 June 2008
- Genre: Psychedelic pop; folktronica
- Length: 4:07
- Label: Mute
- Songwriters: Alison Goldfrapp; Will Gregory
- Producers: Alison Goldfrapp; Will Gregory

Goldfrapp singles chronology
"Happiness" (2008)	"Caravan Girl" (2008)	"Clowns" (2008)

"Caravan Girl" is a song by English electronic music duo Goldfrapp from their fourth studio album, Seventh Tree (2008). Written and produced by Alison Goldfrapp and Will Gregory, the song was released as the album's third single on 30 June 2008 and peaked at number 54 on the UK Singles Chart. In Scotland, the song reached number 6, becoming the third single from Seventh Tree to reach the top 10.

== Composition ==
The song has a similar theme to "Twist" from the duo's 2003 album Black Cherry, and hints at Alison Goldfrapp's sexuality, who later revealed in 2010 she was in a relationship with film editor Lisa Gunning.

AllMusic described the song as "some of the duo's finest escapist pop, capturing the irresistible appeal of running away with big hooks and an even bigger wall of sounds backing them up."

== Music video ==
The music video premiered on Channel 4 on 14 June 2008, and Mute Records made the video available on YouTube the following day. The video, which is Goldfrapp's first not to include Alison Goldfrapp, features a girl riding her longboard. It was filmed, among other places, in Cambria, California. The video was directed by The Malloys.

== Track listings ==
- CD single #1
1. "Caravan Girl" – 4:04
2. "Happiness" (Video) – 3:41
- CD single #2
1. "Caravan Girl" (Live Choral Version) – 4:44
2. "Monster Love" (Live Acoustic Version) – 4:41
3. "Little Bird" (Live at the Union Chapel) (Video) – 6:35
- 7-inch single

A. "Caravan Girl" (Edit) – 3:40
B. "Little Bird" (Animal Collective Remix) – 3:19

- Digital single (2018)
1. "Caravan Girl" – 4:05
2. "Caravan Girl" (Live Choral Version) – 4:42
3. "Little Bird" (Animal Collective Remix) – 3:19
4. "Monster Love" (Live Acoustic Version) – 4:38
5. "Winter Wonderland" – 3:10

== Personnel ==
The following people contributed to "Caravan Girl":

- Alison Goldfrapp – vocals
- Flood – co-producer, keyboards, mixing
- Alex Lee – acoustic guitar
- Tony Hoffer – bass guitar, engineering, mixing
- Adrian Utley – bass, guitar
- Chris Goulstone – drum samples
- Aidan Love – keyboards
- The Metro Voices – choir
- Jenny O'Grady – choir master
- Stephen Marcussen – mastering
- Bill Mims – engineering, mixing assistant

== Charts ==
Chart (2008)	Peak position
Scotland (OCC)	6
UK Singles (OCC)	54
US Dance Singles Sales (Billboard)	9
US Hot Singles Sales (Billboard)	25
