= Happiness (Goldfrapp song) =

2008 single by Goldfrapp

Single by Goldfrapp

from the album Seventh Tree
- B-side: "Road to Somewhere"; "Monster Love"; "Eat Yourself"
- Released: 14 April 2008
- Genre: Folktronica; pop
- Length: 4:17 (album version); 3:37 (single version)
- Label: Mute
- Songwriter(s): Alison Goldfrapp; Will Gregory
- Producer(s): Alison Goldfrapp; Will Gregory

Goldfrapp singles chronology
| "A&E" (2008) | "Happiness" (2008) | "Caravan Girl" (2008) |

"Happiness" is a song by the English duo Goldfrapp from their fourth studio album, Seventh Tree (2008). Written and produced by Alison Goldfrapp and Will Gregory, the song was released as the album's second single on 14 April 2008. It was featured in advertisements for the newly rebranded SyFy network. It reached number 25 on the UK Singles Chart and remains their last top 40 hit. In Scotland, the single peaked at number 6.

== Composition and lyrics ==
"Happiness" was described as a "'Penny Lane'-as-performed-by-Munchkins pop number" and "Beatlesque" and is in swing time. The lyrics display some irony, contrasting with the "cheery" sound of the music, as they satirise self-help groups that are disguising their desire for money.

== Music video ==
The music video for "Happiness" was directed by Dougal Wilson. The video features a young man (George Foster) dressed in a white suit, jumping joyfully around Addington Square in Camberwell, South London. The video, a homage to the "Street Dance" sequence from the 1953 American musical film Small Town Girl, begins with Alison Goldfrapp sitting on the front steps of a house when suddenly the young man appears jumping up a set of steps next to her. Goldfrapp makes additional cameo appearances in the video as a black-haired bus traveller, a policewoman, a topiarist, and a braided flower stand keeper. Will Gregory makes similar appearances as, among others, a street sweeper and a postman. The video concludes with the cast of background characters coming together along with the young man, who then jumps in a circle with young children and a dancing dog. In the final scene, two elderly people—Goldfrapp and Gregory—arrive to join the revelry.

== Track listings ==
- CD single 1
1. "Happiness" (Single Version) – 3:38
2. "Road to Somewhere" (Acoustic Version) – 3:48
- CD single 2
1. "Happiness" (Beyond the Wizards Sleeve Re-Animation) – 7:49
2. "Monster Love" (Goldfrapp vs. Spiritualized) – 5:36
3. "Eat Yourself" (Yeasayer Remix) – 2:25
- 7-inch limited picture disc
1. "Happiness" (Single Version) – 3:38
2. "Happiness" (Metronomy Remix feat. The Teenagers) – 4:10
- Digital single (2019)
1. "Happiness" (Single Version) – 3:37
2. "Happiness" (Metronomy Remix feat. The Teenagers) – 4:10
3. "Road to Somewhere" (Acoustic Version) – 3:50
4. "Happiness" (Beyond the Wizards Sleeve Re-Animation) – 7:48
5. "Monster Love" (Goldfrapp vs. Spiritualized) – 5:37
6. "Eat Yourself" (Yeasayer Remix) – 2:26
7. "Happiness" (Live at the Union Chapel)* – 4:42
- *Recorded 4 March 2008.

== Personnel ==
The following people contributed to "Happiness":

=== Musicians ===
- Alison Goldfrapp – vocals
- Flood – keyboards
- Charlie Jones – bass
- Metro Voices – choir
- Jenny O'Grady – choir master
- Damon Reece – drums, percussion

=== Production ===
- Alison Goldfrapp – producer, engineer, art direction
- Will Gregory – producer, engineer
- Cathy Edwards – art direction
- Flood – co-producer
- Tony Hoffer – mixing
- Serge Leblon – photography
- Mat Maitland – art direction, design
- Stephen Marcussen – mastering
- Bill Mims – assistant mixing
- Tim Oliver – engineering

== Charts ==
| Chart (2008) | Peak position |
|---|---|
| Europe (European Hot 100 Singles) | 81 |
| Scotland (OCC) | 6 |
| UK Singles (OCC) | 25 |
