= Possible (charity) =

British campaign about climate change

- Formation: 1 September 2009 (17 years ago)
- Type: INGO non-profit charity
- Purpose: Climate change action, carbon emissions reduction
- Headquarters: London, England, United Kingdom
- Budget: £642,904 (2018/2019)
- Revenue: £553,556 (2018/2019)
- Staff: 9.5 (2018/2019)
- Website: www.wearepossible.org
- Formerly called: 10:10 Climate Action

Possible (which changed its name from 10:10 Climate Action in October 2019) is a climate-change-focused charity, founded in 2009.

== Founding and launch ==
10:10 was established by the team that produced climate change docudrama The Age of Stupid. The organization was party to the 2009 UN Climate Change Conference in Copenhagen.

A public launch event was held at Tate Modern in London in September 2009, where members of the public could make a personal commitment to the 10% goal.

In the first 72 hours 10,000 people, businesses and organisations signed up, including ZSL London Zoo, the Royal Opera House and Tottenham Hotspur Football Club.

== Projects ==
=== Unblocking onshore wind ===
In 2015, believing that the British public were opposed to onshore wind farms, the UK government removed financial support for onshore wind (they were no longer able to bid for contracts to provide the UK's electricity), and changed English planning regulations so that it became difficult (and expensive) for onshore wind projects to get the go ahead.

In 2016, the charity launched a public campaign to support the removal of the blocks on onshore wind through petitions, stunts, and lobbying MPs. By April 2019, the charity and its supporters, had gained support of 158 MPs who signed an open letter asking the prime minister to remove the blocks. On 2 March 2020, the government announced that onshore wind projects would once again be able to bid for contracts from 2021.

The charity continues to campaign to challenge the planning barriers so that community wind projects can come into fruition.

=== Car Free Cities ===
In March 2021, the charity launched a campaign seeking to address car dominance in four UK cities – Birmingham, Bristol, Leeds and London. The campaign aims to help local communities reimagine their own neighbourhoods where car dependency is a thing of the past; and to co-design and deliver practical grassroots solutions that reduce motor traffic dominance.

The charity makes clear that their vision of a “car free city” is a city which is free of the dangers, pollution, and emissions caused by mass private car ownership. It's not a city with no cars at all. They emphasise that many people, including some disabled people, cannot get around without a car, and the charity's efforts to reduce the number of cars in cities hopes to make their lives easier too.

=== Climate Perks ===
In 2019, the charity launched a scheme which enables employers to offer paid ‘journey days’ to empower staff to choose low-carbon holiday travel. Government data shows that within the UK 70% of all flights are taken by just 15% of people, and that these ‘frequent flyers’ are more likely to be professionals with disposable income. The charity believes that helping to shift these travel habits is the quickest and smartest way to keep carbon emissions from planes in check, whilst ensuring those with the most responsibility to cut down are most empowered to take action.

Employers that have signed up to the scheme include Bennetts Associates and Direct Ferries.

=== Riding Sunbeams ===
Through their FOAK 2019 project (funded by the Department for Transport), the Riding Sunbeams team successfully connected solar energy directly into Direct-Current, third rail powered railways, in conjunction with Network Rail at their Aldershot site. They were the first to achieve this globally.

== Past projects ==
=== Back Balcombe ===
On 27 March 2014, the charity launched Back Balcombe, a project set up to support a renewable energy co-operative and use its prominence to promote community-scale renewable energy nationally. In summer 2013, Balcombe became the focal point for a national debate about the role of shale gas and oil in Britain's energy mix, after the start of exploratory oil drilling nearby sparked a major protest and divided local opinion.

In response, a group of residents agreed to establish a community-owned solar project with support from Possible staff. The project would aim to match 100% Balcombe's domestic electricity needs with local solar power, and reunite the village around a positive energy project.

REPOWERBalcombe, the local co-operative, and Back Balcombe, Possible's national support effort, both launched publicly in March 2014. The project has received widespread media coverage since its launch. It has been featured in The Telegraph, The Times, and The Guardian, and on Channel 4 News and the BBC's The One Show.

Possible also claims to be in touch with seven 'copycat' groups that aim to follow in REPOWERBalcombe's footsteps, several of which are in communities close to proposed fossil fuel drilling projects.

REPOWERBalcombe has installed solar panels on a local farm and two local primary schools, financing them with shares bought by local people. In autumn 2015 it will be running a national share offer and fundraising effort to finance the building of a 5 MW solar farm in the nearby village of West Hoathly.

=== #itshappening ===
The itshappening project showcases carbon reduction projects and success stories from around the world, aiming to overcome pessimism about the possibility of tackling climate change and build motivation for more ambitious action.

As of January 2015, the gallery had been shared 11,635 times. Other people and organisations have also adopted the #itshappening hashtag to post their own carbon reduction success stories. The UNFCCC's Christiana Figueres has voiced her support for the project, and it has been praised by the RSA in its report "A New Agenda on Climate Change".

=== Solar Schools ===
Solar Schools is a community crowdfunding programme that helps schools raise money for solar panels.

Participating schools are given training, resources and personal support to run their own local crowdfunding campaign, with most aiming to raise around £10,000. The project is open to primary, secondary and middle schools, and sixth form colleges. There is no charge to take part.

Following a successful pilot phase in the 2011–12 academic year, the project launched nationally in September 2012. Altogether, 27 schools participated in 2012–13, 17 participated in 2013–14, and 15 in 2014–15. Another 14 schools are due to start in September 2015. The project helps schools reduce their carbon footprint and earn income from the electricity they generate. But it also aims to strengthen the local community, provide pupils with opportunities to learn about climate change, and build public support for renewable energy by helping communities to benefit from it directly.

==== Results ====
As of November 2014, 28 schools had raised enough money for solar panels, and 27 schools had installed them through the scheme. Collectively, the schools have raised over £500,000. In 2012, the project was cited in the House of Commons by Labour MP Alex Cunningham as an example of the benefits of solar power.

Independent research commissioned by Possible in spring 2014 found that the Solar Schools project has a positive impact on the schools and communities that take part. Among volunteers and donors it promotes greater charitable giving and eagerness to be involved in community projects. It also encourages more positive attitudes towards renewable energy and climate change.

=== 10% in 2010 ===
Possible's original campaign encouraged and supported individuals and organisations to cut their carbon emissions by 10% in 2010, and gave the group its name, 10:10 Climate Action. There was heavy media coverage around the launch date, and there were regular articles about the campaign's progress published by The Guardian.

==== Notable participants ====
The campaign attracted support from a public figures and organisations, described by The Guardian as from a "cross-section" of UK society. By the end of 2010 there were approximately 110,000 individuals, 4,000 businesses, 1,700 schools and 1,600 organisations signed up. Dozens of high-profile individuals signed up to the scheme. They included chef Hugh Fearnley-Whittingstall, fashion designer Vivienne Westwood, TV and radio presenter Kevin McCloud, and actor Peter Capaldi.

The organisations signed up included King's College London, the Science Museum, Royal Mail, Tottenham Hotspur football club, Adidas, and the entire Methodist Church of Great Britain.

==== Global presence ====
Possible attracted significant international interest following its UK launch, and on 9 April 2010, the group announced 10:10 Global, a network of 'hubs' running their own local or national 10% campaigns. In December 2011, the organisation claimed to have hubs in 41 countries, including France, Argentina, Ghana, Australia, Bangladesh, Chile and the Netherlands. 10:10 Global officially ended with the original 10% campaign, but several hubs have continued to campaign in various guises.

==== Results ====
When the Conservatives and Lib Dems came to office in May 2010, David Cameron and Nick Clegg pledged to cut central government's carbon by 10% in 12 months. The government eventually cut their emissions by 14%.

A number of local councils surpassed their target, including Crawley Council, which managed 11% in 2010 by installing LED lighting, purchasing more fuel efficient vehicles and a greener computing system.

British embassies from all over the world also signed up, with some cutting their emissions by up to 60%. The British embassy in Beijing cut its overall emissions by 48%, including a 68% reduction in their travel emissions, and the embassy in Montevideo, Uruguay, cut its emissions by 30% thanks to taking fewer flights and more efficient heating.

The Science Museum cut its emissions by 17% thanks to a new heating and cooling system in the galleries.

Tottenham Hotspur was particularly committed; it diverted 45% of its waste from landfills to recycling, and introduced new low-wattage stadium lighting, achieving its 10% cut.

First Direct also signed up, and encouraged its employees to do likewise—in the first two weeks 500 had joined. It also put solar panels on its Leeds headquarters.

Transport for London cut the carbon emissions of ten stations by 10% over the year, including Victoria and Bank, by reducing escalator service at off-peak times.

While Possible no longer runs a target-based campaign, it continues to offer support and advice on carbon reduction to those who joined the original 10% campaign, as well as new supporters that come via its other projects.

=== Lighter Later ===
On Sunday 28 March 2010, Possible launched a campaign to move the clocks in Britain forward by one hour, giving Britain an extra hour of sunlight in the evening.

Possible promoted a carbon reduction rationale for the change, arguing that reduced demand for electric lighting would cut the UK's carbon emissions by 447,000 tonnes per year. It also campaigned on the potential gains for health, tourism and road safety.

The focal point for the campaign was the Daylight Saving Bill. Possible formed and headed a coalition of 83 organisations supporting the Bill, and employed public mobilisation as a primary tactic to move it through the parliamentary process. The campaign used an online tool to help supporters write personalised letters to their MPs. The tool provided talking points and writing advice tailored to each MP's position on the issue.

After passing through the Report Stage in the House of Commons, the Daylight Saving Bill was eventually filibustered at its third reading. The filibuster was later cited in a House of Commons committee report into the shortcomings of the private members bill system. In June 2012, Possible suspended the Lighter Later campaign indefinitely.

=== No Pressure ===
On 1 October 2010, Possible released the satirical short film No Pressure in which children and adults are graphically blown up for being insufficiently enthusiastic about the project, after being asked to participate at school and at work. Although originally planned to be shown in cinema and television advertisements, Possible removed the film from their website and YouTube later on the day of release, following negative publicity. Possible director Eugenie Harvey subsequently apologised to the public and all sponsors and charities who had supported the film's production.
