= Seventh Tree =

2008 studio album by Goldfrapp

Studio album by Goldfrapp
- Released: 22 February 2008
- Recorded: 2006–2007
- Studios: Abbey Road (London) (Note: Strings); Home studio (Somerset, England)
- Genres: Folktronica; ambient; downtempo; dream pop
- Length: 41:41
- Label: Mute
- Producers: Alison Goldfrapp; Will Gregory

Goldfrapp chronology
We Are Glitter (2006)	Seventh Tree (2008)	iTunes Originals: Goldfrapp (2008)

Alternative cover
- Special edition cover

Singles from Seventh Tree
- 1. "A&E" Released: 11 February 2008; 2. "Happiness" Released: 14 April 2008; 3. "Caravan Girl" Released: 30 June 2008; 4. "Clowns" Released: 20 October 2008

Seventh Tree is the fourth studio album by English electronic music duo Goldfrapp, released on 22 February 2008 by Mute Records. It was named after a dream Alison Goldfrapp had about a "very large tree". Taking inspiration from paganism and surreal English children's books, Goldfrapp described the album as a "sensual counterpoint to the glitterball glamour of Supernature", their previous studio album from 2005.

Seventh Tree became the duo's most critically acclaimed album since their 2000 debut Felt Mountain, with critics praising their new sound and their bravery for abandoning the dance atmosphere of their previous two albums. The album debuted at number two on the UK Albums Chart with 46,945 copies sold in its first week.

Four singles were released from the album. "A&E" was released as the lead single on 11 February 2008, peaking at number 10 on the UK singles chart. The album's second single, "Happiness", peaked at number 25 on the UK chart, while the third single, "Caravan Girl", reached number 54. "Clowns" was released as the fourth and final single, charting at number 115 in the UK.

== Background ==
The band were inspired by an acoustic radio session they had performed, which led the duo to incorporate acoustic guitars into their music to create "warm" and "delicate" sounds. They began writing and recording the album at the end of 2006 in Bath, England.

== Critical reception ==
Professional ratings
Aggregate scores
Source	Rating
Metacritic	78/100
Review scores
Source	Rating
AllMusic	4/5 stars
The A.V. Club	A−
MusicOMH	4/5 stars
NME	6/10
The Observer	5/5 stars
Pitchfork	4.6/10
PopMatters	8/10
Rolling Stone	3/5 stars
Slant Magazine	4/5 stars
Uncut	4/5 stars

Seventh Tree received generally positive reviews from music critics. At Metacritic, which assigns a normalised rating out of 100 to reviews from mainstream publications, the album received an average score of 78, based on 32 reviews. Barney Hoskyns of The Observer commented that the duo "have made an album as hummably lovely as it is knowingly referencing of a certain tradition of neo-psychedelic English whimsy." Genevieve Koski of The A.V. Club noted that the album is "buoyed by an underlying pop sensibility, epitomized by the bubbly 'A&E;' and 'Caravan Girl'", concluding, "After the group's hit-or-miss synth-pop detour, Seventh Tree situates Goldfrapp where it was always meant to be." John Murphy of MusicOMH viewed it as Goldfrapp's "most subtle, affecting and rewarding album to date" and compared it to Kate Bush and the Cocteau Twins. At AllMusic, Heather Phares praised the album's "electro hippie-chic" as the duo's "most polished and luxe work yet". John Lewis of Uncut called it "brave, bonkers, often beautiful, sometimes haunting and occasionally ridiculous".

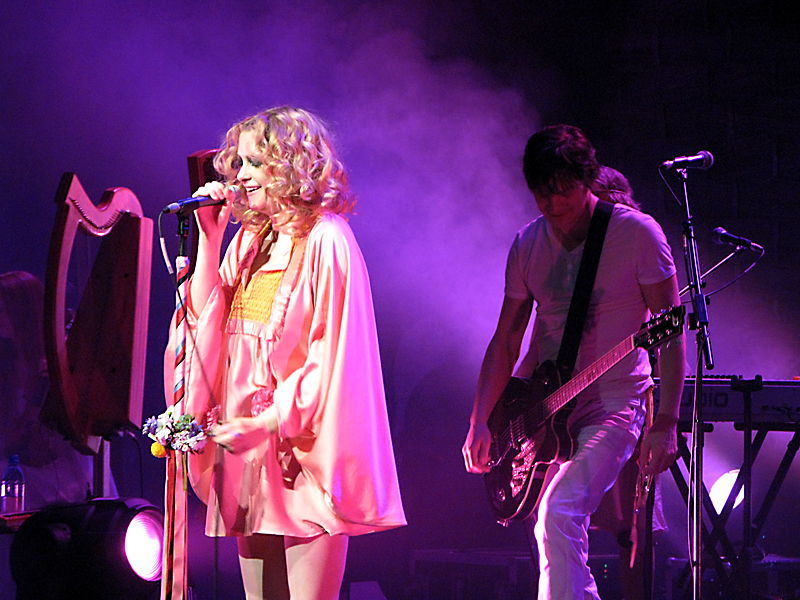
Goldfrapp performing in April 2008

Adrien Begrand of PopMatters found that Seventh Tree "might be a quieter and more introspective disc than we'd been expecting, but this is still a quintessential Goldfrapp album with Gregory's arrangements brilliantly underscoring the inimitable vocal versatility of his female foil." Despite being critical of Alison Goldfrapp's "wispy, ethereal, often impenetrable vocal approach", Dave Hughes of Slant Magazine opined that the album is "most compelling for the way in which the band's regained austerity and naturalism contrasts with their more recent hedonism." Kat Lister of NME expressed that "Seventh Tree is bound to ruffle a few electro-feathered fans, but there's no denying it's a venture that sets the pair into new experimental territory." In a mixed review, Rolling Stone's Christian Hoard felt that the "slow pace can be a snooze", but wrote that the album "still makes for good post-party chill-out music". Nate Patrin of Pitchfork was less impressed, stating that the album's ambience is "so subtle and slow-moving it doesn't seem to go anywhere, and it coasts on some frothy sense of pleasantness that evaporates the moment the song ends."

Q magazine ranked the album at number 19 on its list of The 50 Best Albums of 2008. PopMatters placed it at number 54 on its list of The Best Albums of 2008. Ben Rayner of the Toronto Star included the album on his list of "rock music that stuck in 2008".

== Commercial performance ==
Seventh Tree debuted at number two on the UK Albums Chart, selling 46,945 copies in its first week. It was certified gold by the British Phonographic Industry (BPI) within four days of release, on 29 February 2008. As of March 2010, the album had sold 200,062 copies in the United Kingdom. The album reached the top 10 in Belgium and Ireland, and the top 20 in Australia, Norway, Portugal and Switzerland.

Seventh Tree became Goldfrapp's second release to chart on the Billboard 200 in the United States, where it debuted at number 48 with first-week sales of 15,000 copies. As of December 2009, it had sold 59,000 copies in the United States. The album also peaked at number 28 on the Canadian Albums Chart.

== Special edition ==
A special edition of Seventh Tree was released on 3 November 2008, featuring new album artwork, photographs and a DVD. The album artwork depicted Goldfrapp dressed as a clown and hugging a tree, as well as Gregory dressed as an owl. The DVD contained music videos, behind-the-scenes footage and several live performances filmed at the De La Warr Pavilion in Bexhill-on-Sea in June 2008.

== Track listing ==
All tracks are written by Alison Goldfrapp and Will Gregory.

No.	Title	Length
1.	"Clowns"	4:08
2.	"Little Bird"	4:25
3.	"Happiness"	4:17
4.	"Road to Somewhere"	3:52
5.	"Eat Yourself"	4:06
6.	"Some People"	4:40
7.	"A&E"	3:18
8.	"Cologne Cerrone Houdini"	4:26
9.	"Caravan Girl"	4:05
10.	"Monster Love"	4:23
Total length:		41:41

Digital edition bonus tracks
No.	Title	Length
11.	"Clowns" (instrumental)	4:11
12.	"You Never Know" (live in London)	3:50

Limited edition bonus DVD
No.	Title	Length
1.	"A Short Film"	10:34
2.	"A&E" (music video)	3:39

Special edition bonus DVD
No.	Title	Length
1.	"Clowns (instrumental) / Behind the scenes" (live at De La Warr Pavilion, Bexhill-on-Sea)	3:46
2.	"Happiness" (live at De La Warr Pavilion, Bexhill-on-Sea)	4:43
3.	"You Never Know" (live at De La Warr Pavilion, Bexhill-on-Sea)	4:14
4.	"Caravan Girl" (live at De La Warr Pavilion, Bexhill-on-Sea)	4:56
5.	"Monster Love" (live at De La Warr Pavilion, Bexhill-on-Sea)	4:32
6.	"Little Bird" (live at De La Warr Pavilion, Bexhill-on-Sea)	7:12
7.	"A&E" (music video)	3:39
8.	"Happiness" (music video)	3:38
9.	"Caravan Girl" (music video)	3:42
10.	"Clowns" (TV performance)	4:10
11.	"Road to Somewhere" (TV performance)	3:50

== Personnel ==
Credits adapted from the liner notes of Seventh Tree.

=== Goldfrapp ===
- Alison Goldfrapp
- Will Gregory

=== Additional musicians ===
- Nick Ingman – string orchestration, string conducting
- Everton Nelson – string leader
- Aidan Love – additional programming (tracks 2, 8, 10); keys (track 8)
- Nick Batt – additional drum programming (tracks 4, 7)
- Max Dingle – additional drum programming (track 8)
- Richard Evans – guitars (track 10)
- Steve Evans – acoustic guitar (track 7)
- Flood – keys (tracks 3, 7, 9); guitar (track 7)
- Chris Goulstone – drum samples (track 9); guitars (track 10)
- Tony Hoffer – bass (track 9)
- Charlie Jones – bass (tracks 2, 3, 8, 10); twang bass (track 9)
- Alex Lee – acoustic guitar (tracks 1, 8, 9); electric guitar, bass (track 5); Nashville guitar (track 2)
- Justin Meldal-Johnsen – bass (tracks 6, 7)
- Kit Morgan – acoustic guitar (track 1)
- Andrew Murphy – acoustic guitar (track 1)
- Damon Reece – drums (tracks 2, 3, 9); percussion (track 3)
- Simon Rogers – Indian guitar (track 4)
- Adrian Utley – fuzz bass, fuzz guitar (track 9)
- Ruth Wall – harp samples (tracks 4, 7)
- Denny Weston Jr. – drums (tracks 6, 7)
- Metro Voices – choir (tracks 3, 5, 9)
- Jenny O'Grady – choir master (tracks 3, 5, 9)
- Strings (tracks 1, 2, 4–6, 8, 10)
  - Everton Nelson, Jackie Shave, Boguslaw Kostecki, Ann Morfee, Chris Tombling, Mark Berrow, Cathy Thompson, Debbie Widdup, Alexander Bălănescu, Stephen Morris, Chris Clad, Tom Pigott-Smith, Dermot Crehan, Sonia Slany, Joanathan Rees, Patrick Kiernan – violin
  - Jon Thorne, Peter Lale, Andy Parker, Katie Wilkinson, Chris Pitsilides – viola
  - David Daniels, Cathy Giles, Chris Worsey, Melissa Phelps, Robin Firman, Paul Kegg – cello
  - Mary Scully, Paddy Lannigan – double bass

=== Technical ===
- Alison Goldfrapp – recording, production (all tracks); mixing (track 8)
- Will Gregory – recording, production (all tracks); mixing (track 8)
- Flood – co-production (tracks 3, 5–7, 9); additional production (tracks 1, 2, 4, 8, 10); mixing (track 7); additional stems mixing (track 9)
- Tony Hoffer – mixing (tracks 1–6, 9, 10); overdub engineering (tracks 6, 7, 9)
- Bill Mims – mixing assistance (tracks 1–6, 9, 10); overdub engineering (tracks 6, 7, 9)
- Tim Oliver – additional engineering, additional recording
- Jonathan Allen – strings recording
- Stephen Marshall – strings recording assistance
- Stephen Marcussen – mastering

=== Artwork ===
- Alison Goldfrapp – art direction, owl drawing
- Mat Maitland – art direction, design
- Serge Leblon – photography
- Cathy Edwards – art direction

== Charts ==
=== Weekly charts ===
Weekly chart performance for Seventh Tree
Chart (2008)	Peak position
Australian Albums (ARIA)	11
Austrian Albums (Ö3 Austria)	37
Belgian Albums (Ultratop Flanders)	10
Belgian Albums (Ultratop Wallonia)	36
Canadian Albums (Nielsen SoundScan)	28
Dutch Albums (Album Top 100)	24
European Albums (Billboard)	5
French Albums (SNEP)	37
German Albums (Offizielle Top 100)	21
Irish Albums (IRMA)	9
Italian Albums (FIMI)	57
New Zealand Albums (RMNZ)	39
Norwegian Albums (VG-lista)	18
Portuguese Albums (AFP)	18
Scottish Albums (Official Charts)	4
Spanish Albums (Promusicae)	72
Swiss Albums (Schweizer Hitparade)	11
UK Albums (Official Charts)	2
US Billboard 200	48
US Top Alternative Albums (Billboard)	12
US Top Rock Albums (Billboard)	14

=== Year-end charts ===
Year-end chart performance for Seventh Tree
Chart (2008)	Position
UK Albums (OCC)	86

== Certifications ==
Certifications for Seventh Tree
Region	Certification	Certified units/sales
United Kingdom (BPI)	Gold	200,062

== Release history ==
Release dates and formats for Seventh Tree
Region	Date	Format	Edition	Label	Ref(s)
Australia	22 February 2008	CD	Standard	Virgin	
Australia	25 February 2008	Digital download	Standard	Mute	
France	25 February 2008	CD; digital download	Standard	Labels	
France	25 February 2008	CD + DVD	Limited	Labels	
Germany	25 February 2008	CD; digital download	Standard	Mute	
Germany	25 February 2008	CD + DVD	Limited	Mute	
United Kingdom	25 February 2008	CD; LP; digital download	Standard	Mute	
United Kingdom	25 February 2008	CD + DVD	Limited	Mute	
United States	26 February 2008	CD; digital download	Standard	Mute	
Japan	27 February 2008	CD	Standard	EMI	
Germany	31 October 2008	CD + DVD	Special	Mute	
United Kingdom	3 November 2008	CD + DVD	Special	Mute	
