= Goldfrapp =

English electronic music duo

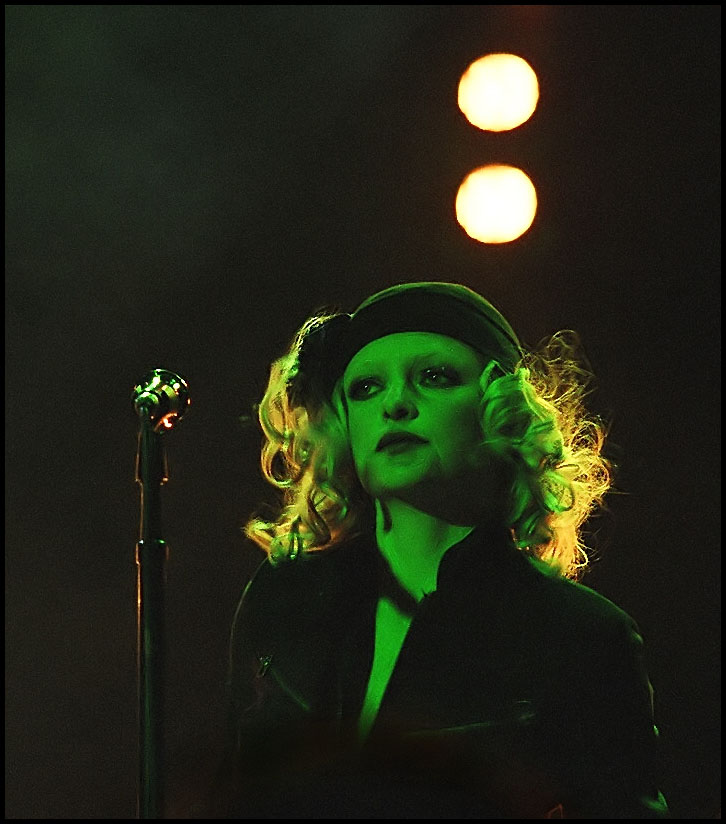
- Alison Goldfrapp performing live in Cambridge, 2005

Background information
- Origin: London, England
- Genres: Synth-pop; electroclash; trip hop; folktronica; ambient
- Years active: 1999–2022 (on hiatus)
- Labels: Mute; Parlophone; Astralwerks
- Past members: Alison Goldfrapp; Will Gregory
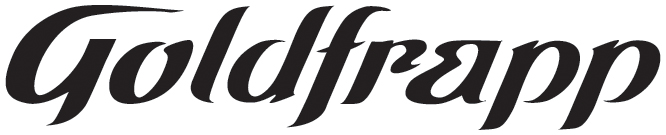
- Website: goldfrapp.com

Goldfrapp were an English electronic music duo from London, formed in 1999. The duo consisted of Alison Goldfrapp (vocals, synthesiser) and Will Gregory (synthesiser).

Despite favourable reviews and a short-listing for the Mercury Prize, their 2000 début studio album Felt Mountain did not chart highly. Goldfrapp's second album Black Cherry, which incorporated glam rock and synth-pop sounds into their music, was released in 2003. The album's dance-oriented sound was carried over to their third album, Supernature. Supernature took Goldfrapp's work further into dance music, and enjoyed international chart success. The album produced three number-one US dance singles, and was nominated for Best Electronic/Dance Album at the 49th Grammy Awards.

Their fourth album Seventh Tree placed a greater emphasis on ambient and downtempo music, drawing inspiration from nature and paganism, while their fifth album, Head First, found the group exploring 1980s-influenced synth-pop. Head First also earned the duo their second Grammy Award nomination for Best Electronic/Dance Album in 2010. Goldfrapp released their critically acclaimed sixth studio album, the folktronica-influenced Tales of Us, in September 2013. Goldfrapp released their seventh studio album, Silver Eye, in March 2017, which debuted at number six on the UK Albums Chart. The same position was achieved by Alison Goldfrapp's May 2023 debut solo album The Love Invention.

The duo has been on indefinite hiatus since 2022.

== History ==
=== 1999: Formation ===
Alison Goldfrapp began her musical career performing with Dance Company Catherine Massin throughout the Netherlands during her early twenties. Afterwards, she attended Middlesex University, where she studied fine art and started creating live performance pieces. In the early 1990s, Goldfrapp served as a guest vocalist with the electronic band Orbital and trip hop artist Tricky. In 1999, she was introduced to composer Will Gregory after he listened to an early version of the song "Human". Gregory and Goldfrapp felt a mutual connection and wrote the track "Lovely Head". Following several months of phone calls, they decided to form a band and began performing under the name Goldfrapp.

In August 1999, Goldfrapp signed a recording contract with London-based record label Mute Records. They recorded their debut album over six months, beginning in September 1999, in a rented bungalow in the Wiltshire countryside. The recording process was difficult, as they were disturbed by the mice and insects in the bungalow.

=== 2000–2002: Felt Mountain ===
Goldfrapp's début album Felt Mountain was released in September 2000 and produced the singles "Lovely Head", "Utopia", "Pilots (On a Star)" and "Human". It featured Alison Goldfrapp's vocals over cinematic soundscapes and is influenced by a variety of music styles including cabaret, folk and electronic music. The album was well received by music critics, including Pitchfork Media who described its sound as "simultaneously smarmy and seductive, yet elegant and graceful". It reached number 57 on the UK Albums Chart, and was certified gold by the British Phonographic Industry. In 2001, Felt Mountain was shortlisted for the Mercury Prize, an annual music prize awarded for the best British or Irish album from the previous year.

The lyrics on Felt Mountain were written by Alison Goldfrapp and are abstract obsessional tales inspired by films and her childhood. The song "Oompa Radar" was inspired by Roman Polanski's film Cul-de-sac, while "Pilots" describes travellers floating in the atmosphere above the earth.

To promote Felt Mountain, Goldfrapp toured the U.K., Europe and North America, supporting the alternative music bands Nick Cave and the Bad Seeds and Doves. The band found it difficult to perform songs from the album live because of their complex arrangements which required up to forty musicians. They eventually settled on performing with violinist Davide Rossi, drummer Rowan Oliver and keyboardist Andy Davies.

=== 2003–2004: Black Cherry ===
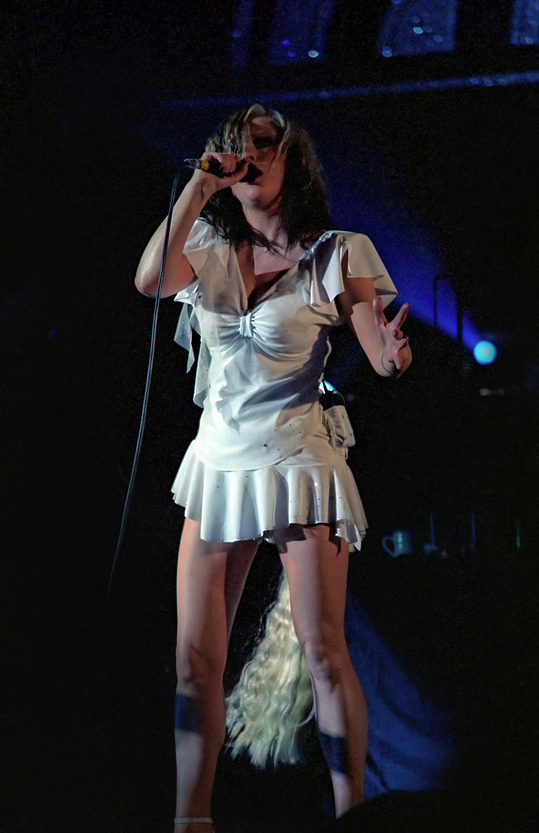
Alison Goldfrapp wearing a horse tail while performing in October 2003

Goldfrapp's second album Black Cherry was released in April 2003. The band recorded the album in a darkened studio in Bath, England. The album focused more heavily on dance music and glam rock-inspired synths than its predecessor. Alison Goldfrapp commented that the album differed from Felt Mountain because the band "felt that we really didn't want to repeat what we had done...we kind of wanted to do something that felt equally as fresh to us as the first one felt fresh to us, and we wanted to put more kind of "oomph" in it." The album received positive reviews from critics. The Guardian found it to be an "unexpected delight" and About.com called it a "rare electronica album of warmth and depth...the ultimate chillout pleasure". Black Cherry peaked at number 19 on the UK Albums Chart and number four on the Billboard Top Electronic Albums chart in the United States. It sold well, reaching platinum status in the UK and selling 52,000 copies in the U.S. as of August 2006.

The first single released from the album was "Train", which reached number 23 on the UK Singles Chart. The song's lyrics discuss obsession and overindulgence and were inspired by Goldfrapp's visit to Los Angeles while touring in support of Felt Mountain. "Strict Machine" was released as the album's second single. The song proved successful on several formats, and reached number one on the US Hot Dance Club Play chart. In 2004, "Strict Machine" won an Ivor Novello Award for "Best Dance Single". The third single released from Black Cherry was "Twist", a song inspired by a fantasy that Goldfrapp had about a boy who worked in a fairground. The title track was released as the album's fourth single and reached number 28 in the UK.

In 2003, Alison Goldfrapp modified her image, from a sophisticated Marlene Dietrich inspired look to that of a new wave diva. The reinvented image included false eyelashes, customised T-shirts, military uniforms and fishnet stockings. Starting in March 2003, the band toured the album, with a concert series entitled Black Cherry Tour. In 2004, the band further toured Australia, Japan, Europe and North America and embarked on the Wonderful Electric Tour. Sections of the stage show featured Goldfrapp in a white dress wearing a horse tail and dancers with deer heads, and were inspired by Goldfrapp's interest in animals and mythology.

=== 2005–2006: Supernature ===
Supernature, Goldfrapp's third album, was released in August 2005. The album comprises pop and electronic dance music prominently featured on Black Cherry, but focuses more on subtle hooks instead of the large choruses that made up its predecessor. The band never intended to create dance music, however, previous releases were popular across nightclubs in North America and as a result, they decided to write a more dance-oriented album. Supernature débuted at number two on the UK Albums Chart and was certified platinum in the UK. As of February 2008, it had sold one million copies worldwide. The album received a Grammy Award nomination in 2007 for Best Electronic/Dance Album and "Ooh La La" was nominated for Best Dance Recording. The song was used for the iPhone 5S's commercial in 2013.

"Ooh La La", the album's lead single, became Goldfrapp's first UK top five single. The song was chosen as the lead single "because it was up and in your face and carried on the theme of the glammy, discoey beat from the last album". "Ooh La La" became the first song performed by the band to feature the electric guitar and was cited as a highlight of the album by Allmusic. "Number 1" was released as the album's second single. Constructed around a synthesiser and bass arrangement, it was written about the importance of relationships. The album's third single "Ride a White Horse" was inspired by the disco era and reached number 15 in the UK. "Fly Me Away" was released as the album's fourth single, but did not perform as well as its predecessors.

In 2006, Goldfrapp released We Are Glitter, a North American-only compilation of remixes from Supernature. It included a Flaming Lips remix of "Satin Chic", the band's favourite song from the album.

=== 2006–2008: Seventh Tree ===
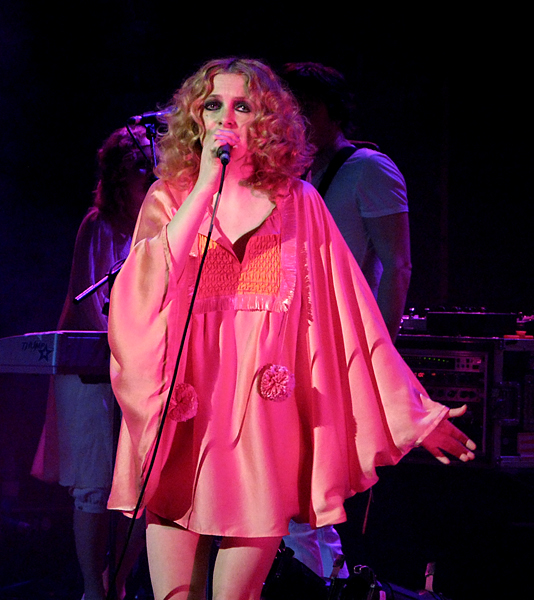
Goldfrapp performing live in 2008

Goldfrapp began writing and recording their fourth album, Seventh Tree, at the end of 2006 in Bath, England; released in February 2008, it débuted at number two on the UK Albums Chart. The album is a departure from the pop and electronic-dance music featured on Supernature, and features ambient and downtempo music. The band were inspired by an acoustic radio session they had performed, which led the duo to incorporate acoustic guitars into their music to create "warm" and "delicate" sounds.

The album's lead single, "A&E", reached number ten in the UK. The single received positive reviews from critics: musicOMH found it to be "a beautifully paced ballad" and Digital Spy called it "lush, folky and organic". "Happiness", the album's second single, reached number 25 in the UK. The third single, "Caravan Girl", which describes the story of a girl that suffers from amnesia, reached number 54 in the UK.

In 2008, Alison Goldfrapp took inspiration from the character of Pierrot and English Folk. The artwork for Seventh Tree featured her dressed as a clown because it is an "iconic image" with "so many different connotations". Goldfrapp chose to tone down her overtly sexual image because she felt that it was taking over the music. Her new image, inspired by Paganism, featured her dressed in white or natural-coloured flowing gowns with loose, curly blond hair.

=== 2009–2012: Head First and The Singles ===
Goldfrapp's fifth album, Head First, was released in March 2010. Recorded over a six-month period, it was a return to the dance oriented sound on previous albums. The album took inspiration from 1980s pop music and bands such as Van Halen and The Pointer Sisters. Alison Goldfrapp described its sound as "optimistic and vibrant." The album received positive reviews from critics, with Allmusic describing it as "a love letter to the frothy, fleeting, but very vital joys of pop music." Head First peaked at number six on the UK Albums Chart and number 45 on the US Billboard 200. The album earned Goldfrapp a Grammy Award nomination in 2011 for Best Electronic/Dance Album and "Rocket" was nominated for Best Dance Recording.

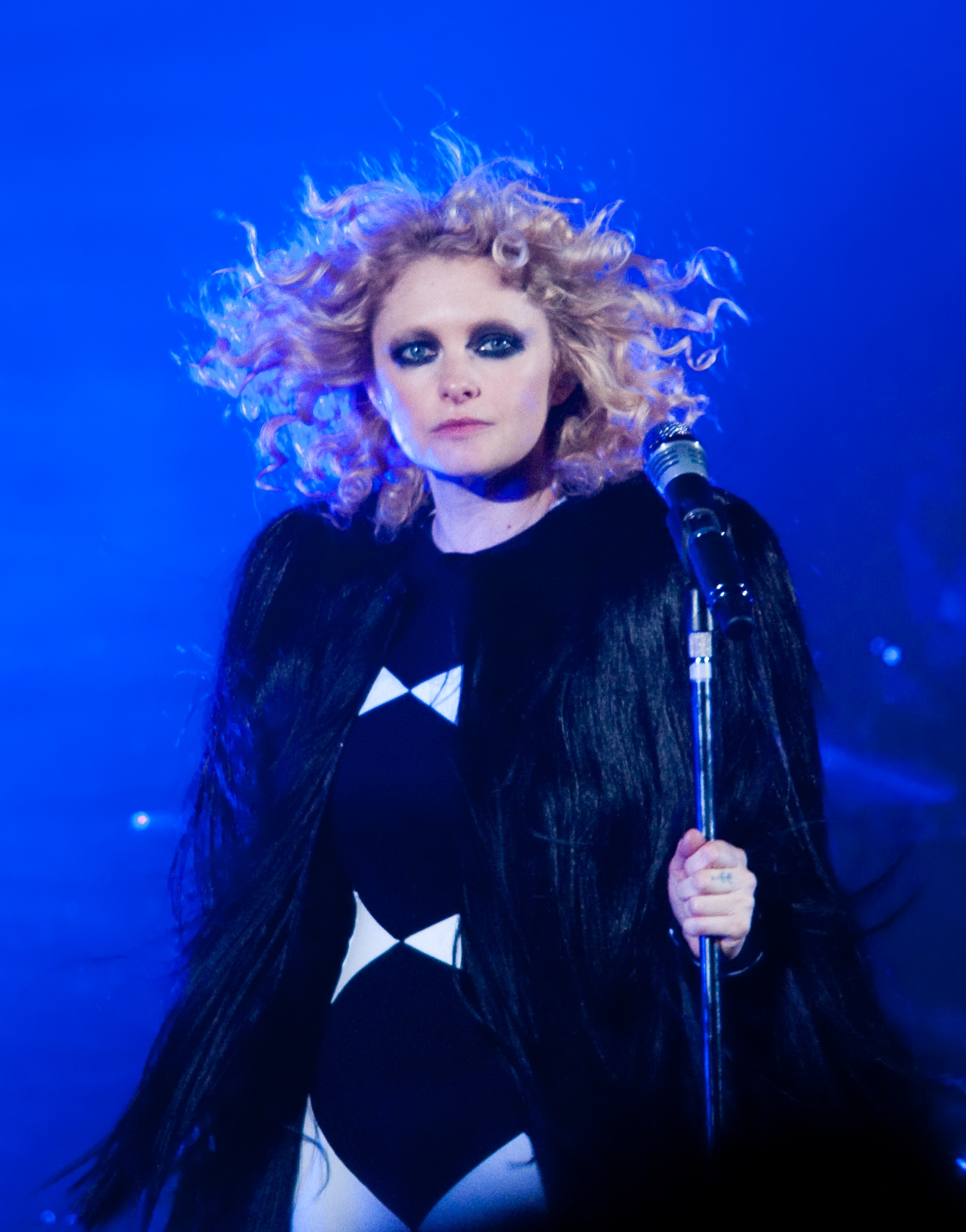
Goldfrapp performing live in 2010

The album's first single was "Rocket", a song about an unfaithful lover. Musically, The Times and Spin have compared the song to "Jump" by American rock band Van Halen. In the US, "Rocket" peaked at number one on the US Hot Dance Club Play chart. "Alive" was released as the album's second single. The song's music video featured Alison Goldfrapp as a 1980s inspired aerobics instructor who leads a group of black metal fans and vampires through a fitness routine. The album's third single "Believer" featured remixes by Vince Clarke and Davide Rossi.

In February 2012, Goldfrapp released the compilation album The Singles. The album contained previously released material as well as two newly recorded songs.

=== 2013–2014: Tales of Us ===
In mid-June, Goldfrapp announced their forthcoming sixth album, Tales of Us, to be released 9 September 2013. The album features ten tracks. All the track titles, with the exception of "Stranger", are given people's names. Goldfrapp confirmed via Twitter that the sound of the album focuses on their softer sounds similar to that of their début piece Felt Mountain as well as their 2008 release Seventh Tree. Accompanying this announcement was the re-launch of the duo's website which features a trailer video directed by Lisa Gunning with the first dates announced for their Tales of Us Tour. "Drew", the first single from the album, was released on 2 September 2013 with an accompanying film directed by Gunning, the first of five films subsequently released to promote the album. Preceding the album's release, Goldfrapp performed the album in its entirety with a 24-piece orchestra and choir over two nights at the Manchester International Festival. Tales of Us was nominally successful upon release, charting in the top 20 in over 15 countries. In March 2014, the Tales of Us worldwide cinema event took place, featuring the full Tales of Us film and a live performance from Air Studios in London. Further singles from the album included "Annabel" and "Stranger".

=== 2015–2018: Silver Eye ===
In July 2015, Alison Goldfrapp announced on Twitter that the group had returned to the studio to work on music for the forthcoming seventh album, but as far as a release date she could only state it would be "sometime in 2017". in December 2016 Goldfrapp posted on their Instagram page the covers of their first six studio albums. On 23 December 2016 Goldfrapp posted an image of two topless figures holding each other's heads, with bleached blonde hair covering their faces, and a black substance slicked across their forearms, along with the hashtag #goldfrapp7. The social media upload was initially assumed to be the seventh album's cover art. This turned out not to be the case. The title of the album was confirmed as Silver Eye. The first track to be played from the album, titled "Anymore", was premiered on Lauren Laverne's BBC 6 Music show on 23 January 2017. Silver Eye was eventually released on 31 March 2017. Silver Eye: Deluxe Edition was released on 6 July 2018. This was the original Silver Eye album with an additional eight remixes, including a collaboration with Dave Gahan of Depeche Mode on the track "Ocean".

=== 2019–present: Felt Mountain: The 20th Year Tour and hiatus ===
In November 2019, a run of six concert dates was announced for 2020 by Alison Goldfrapp on the group's official website, in celebration of the approaching 20th anniversary of the release of the group's debut album Felt Mountain. Goldfrapp commented that the album "represents a very special period in my life. It is the first album Will and I recorded as Goldfrapp, launching us in a new musical direction, and the moment for me, after 13 years or so in music, that I found a creative direction that I was truly excited about. Being nominated for a Mercury Prize was incredible and unexpected, and an affirmation that were embarking on an important journey."

Initially scheduled to begin on 25 March 2020 at Manchester's Albert Hall and conclude on 1 April at the De La Warr Pavilion in Bexhill-on-Sea, the tour was pushed back to 2022 due to the COVID-19 pandemic. The rescheduled tour began at Oxford's O2 Academy on 31 March 2022 and ended at the Royal Festival Hall in London on 15 April.

In September 2021, Goldfrapp were awarded the Ivor Novello inspiration award, which celebrates "peer recognition for the excellence of Goldfrapp songwriting catalogue and in particular how it has inspired the creative talent of other creators".

Goldfrapp have remained on an indefinite hiatus since their last concert at the Lytham Festival on 1 July 2022. Both Goldfrapp and Gregory have since embarked on solo projects. While promoting her debut solo album in 2023, Alison Goldfrapp had stated "never say never" to a reunion and that "we've had a pretty good stint together, ... Will has always had other projects in between, going off and doing his thing, and I've always wanted to do my thing for a long time. Everything is great, it's all good between us, ... but neither of us has plans to make any new music together."

== Musical style ==
Although Goldfrapp's musical style has changed over time, they are considered to be an electronic music act. Goldfrapp has explored a range of musical styles in their songs, although many songs are characterised by Alison Goldfrapp's distinctive breathy, soft soprano vocals and Will Gregory's multi-layered synthesiser / string arrangements. Pitchfork described Goldfrapp's voice as "a cross between Kylie Minogue and PJ Harvey, between Annie [Lennox] and Siouxsie Sioux, between Rachel Stevens and Beth Gibbons".

=== Album style and genre progression ===
The band's sound has progressed from electronic in Felt Mountain, through synth-pop in Black Cherry to a more glam rock-influenced sound in Supernature, and to a blend of ambient, folk, and electronic sounds in Seventh Tree and a 1980s synth-pop influence in Head First. However, they have experimented with other genres of music, such as cabaret ("Cologne Cerrone Houdini", "Human", "Oompa Radar"), operatic pop ("Utopia" and "Pilots"), folktronica ("A&E"), and trip hop ("Little Bird" and "Lovely Head").

=== Musical, cinematic, and other inspiration ===
Alison Goldfrapp listened to Kate Bush, Prince, T. Rex, Donna Summer, and Iggy Pop and The Stooges as a teenager. In the early 1990s, while working in Belgium and travelling Europe, she discovered Serge Gainsbourg, 1970s Polish disco music, and Weimar cabaret. Gregory's musical background was in classical music and he has cited Ennio Morricone as his main influence. Other media, including film, have influenced Goldfrapp; Alison Goldfrapp cites Roman Polanski's psychological thriller Cul-de-sac and the cult film The Wicker Man as influences. They also draw inspiration from surrealism and nature, both of which are reflected in the band's album artwork, which Goldfrapp designs in collaboration with Big Active.

=== Collaboration and composition technique ===
All the band's songs are composed jointly by Goldfrapp and Gregory, although they have collaborated with Nick Batt on several tracks. They have called their writing relationship a "democracy", playing off one another while in the recording studio. While writing, Goldfrapp uses her vocals to create melodies and drumbeats. Gregory composes on vintage keyboards. The band believe that "music is a visual experience" and often visualise their songs before writing them.

== Discography ==
- Felt Mountain (2000)
- Black Cherry (2003)
- Supernature (2005)
- Seventh Tree (2008)
- Head First (2010)
- Tales of Us (2013)
- Silver Eye (2017)

== See also ==
- List of ambient music artists
- List of awards and nominations received by Goldfrapp
