= The Skin We're In =

The Skin We're In is a multimedia project on anti-Black Canadian racism in Canada. Beginning with a 2015 magazine article by Desmond Cole for the magazine Toronto Life, the project has since incorporated two related but distinct parts:

- The Skin We're In (film), a 2017 documentary film by Cole and Charles Officer
- The Skin We're In (book), a 2020 non-fiction book by Cole.
