= A. J. Saudin =

Canadian actor (born 1992)

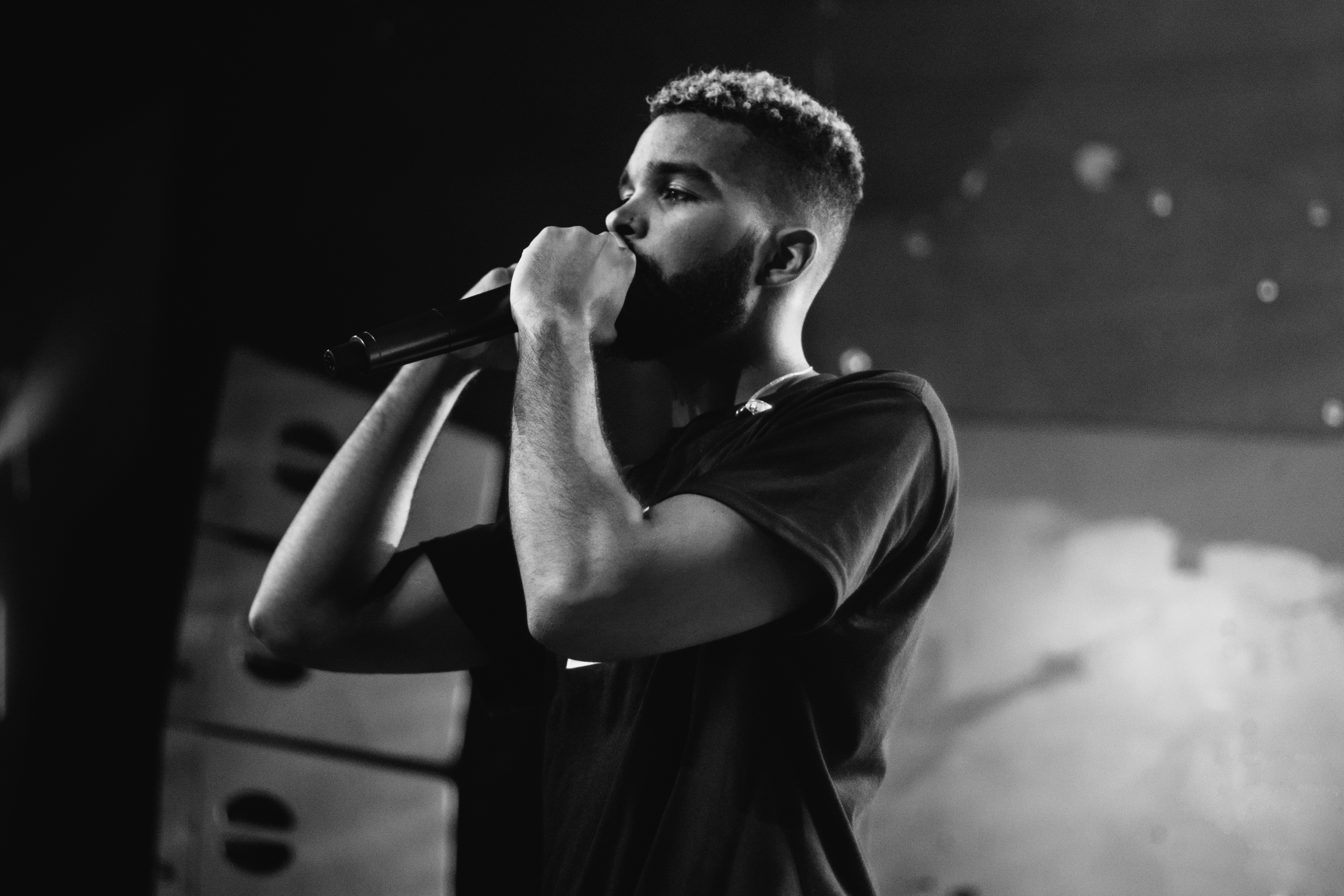
- Born: Faisal A. J. Saudin; May 14, 1992 (age 34); Mississauga, Ontario, Canada
- Other name: Saudin
- Occupation: Actor
- Years active: 2000–present
- Relatives: Shadia Simmons (Sister) Sabrina Saudin (Sister)
- Musical career
- Origin: Mississauga, Ontario
- Genres: Pop; R&B
- Occupations: Singer; songwriter
- Instrument: Vocals
- Years active: 2016–present
- Label: Independent

Faisal A. J. Saudin (born May 14, 1992), known professionally as A. J. Saudin or Saudin, is a Canadian actor, singer, songwriter, and record producer. He is best known for his role as Connor DeLaurier in the long-running teen drama television series Degrassi: The Next Generation.

== Acting career ==
Before finding success on Degrassi, Saudin worked as a child in print work and commercials before landing his first film role as a seven-year-old, working alongside Natalie Cole in Livin' for Love: The Natalie Cole Story (2000).

He also starred in supporting roles on various TV series, including Da Kink in my Hair (2007–2009). He also hosted several episodes of Open Your Ears, a music-centered show that aired on Canada's YTV channel.

Saudin landed his first lead role in the film Aruba (2006), directed by Oscar-nominated director Hubert Davis. The film premiered at the Sundance Film Festival in January 2006, and then screened at several festivals, including the 2006 Toronto International Film Festival, the 2006 Palm Springs International ShortFest, the 2007 Seattle International Film Festival, and the 2008 Kansas City Jubilee Film Festival.

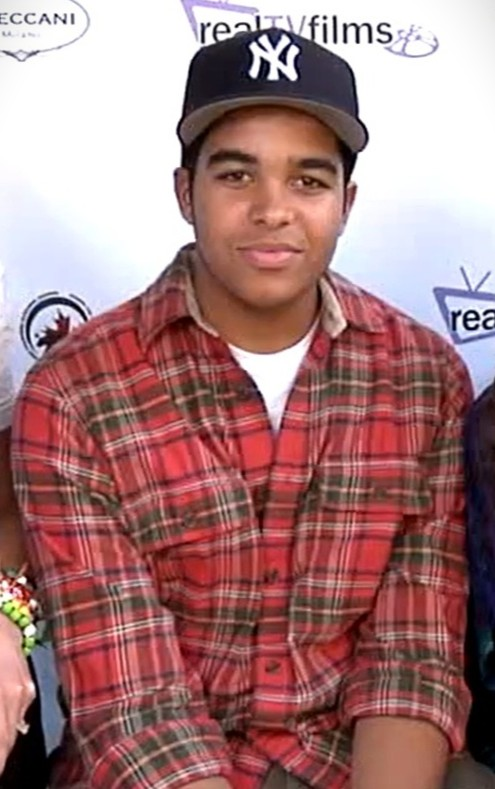
Saudin in 2011

Saudin starred on the hit Canadian TV series Degrassi: The Next Generation for 7 years (2008–2015), playing Connor DeLaurier, a teenager with Asperger syndrome. Saudin exited in the show in 2015 to begin focusing on his music career.

He made an appearance in Drake's 2018 music video for the single I'm Upset. The music video featured a variety of past Degrassi cast members.

== Music career ==
Saudin left Degrassi: The Next Generation in 2015 to begin focusing on his music career, releasing his first single "Sunset" in October 2016. On the social media platform, Twitter, Saudin confirmed he had quit acting permanently to begin working on music.

Saudin released his debut EP, "Before I Met You" on April 21, 2017. The EP featured artists YeAli and Night Lovell.

On August 25, 2017, Saudin released his second EP titled "A Midsummer's Daydream" on all music streaming platforms. The project contains four tracks, and was executive produced by himself, Emjay and dF.

On September 1, 2017, he made his live performance debut at the iconic Mod Club Theatre in Toronto, Ontario to a sold out crowd.

== Discography ==
=== EPs ===
- Before I Met You (2017)
- A Midsummer's Daydream (2017)

== Filmography ==
=== Film ===
Year	Title	Role	Notes
2006	Aruba	Milan-Lead	Short film

=== Television ===
Year	Title	Role	Notes
2000	Livin' for Love: The Natalie Cole Story	Robbie	TV movie
2002	Street Time	Lewis	
2003	Comfort and Joy	Derek Phillips	TV movie
2005	Kojak	Otis Raines / Otis Redding	2 episodes
2007	Friends and Heroes	Sollie	8 episodes
2007–2009	Da Kink in My Hair	Chris	5 episodes
2008	Degrassi in India	Self	TV documentary
2008–2015	Degrassi: The Next Generation	Connor DeLaurier	Main role; 200 episodes
2010	Degrassi in India	Self	TV documentary
2010	Vacation with Derek	Oscar	TV movie
2014	Apple Mortgage Cake	Marcus Logan	TV Movie
2014	Aaliyah: The Princess of R&B	Rashad Haughton (Older)	

=== Music videos ===
Year	Title	Artist	Notes
2018	I'm Upset	Drake	

== Awards and nominations ==
Year	Award	Category	Work	Result	Notes	Ref.
2010	Young Artist Awards	Best Performance in a TV Series - Recurring Actor 14 and Over	Degrassi: The Next Generation	Nominated		
2011	Young Artist Awards	Best Performance in a TV Series - Recurring Young Actor	Degrassi: The Next Generation	Nominated		
2012	Young Artist Awards	Best Performance in a TV Series - Recurring Young Actor 17 to 21	Degrassi: The Next Generation	Won	Tied with Brock Ciarlelli	
