= Ngozi Paul =

Canadian actress

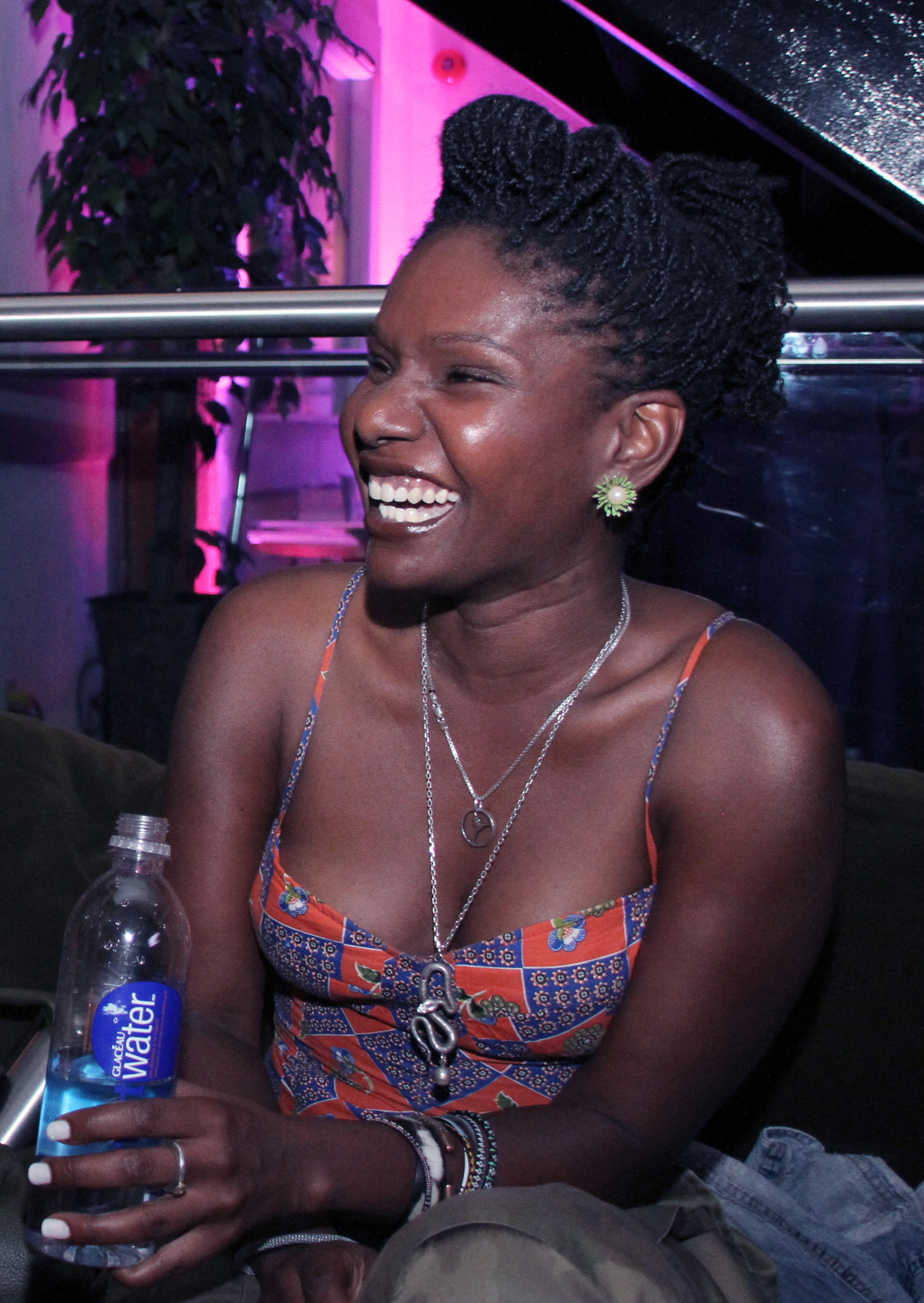
- Paul at the 7th Annual Canadian Filmmakers' Party in September 2012
- Born: Toronto, Ontario, Canada
- Education: National Screen Institute; Stratford Birmingham Conservatory; Canadian Film Centre Film Lab
- Occupations: Actress; writer; director; producer
- Relatives: Annamie Paul (sister)
- Website: www.ngozipaul.com

Ngozi Paul is a Canadian stage and screen actress, writer, director and producer. She is best known as the creator, executive producer, and actress of Global TV's comedic drama Da Kink in My Hair.

== Early life ==
Paul was born and raised in Toronto, Ontario, to a father from Dominica and a mother from St. Kitts and Nevis. She is the younger sister of former Green Party of Canada leader, Annamie Paul. With academic roots in Birmingham Conservatory for Classical Theatre, Ngozi began her acting career on stage at the Stratford Festival of Canada.

== Career ==
In 2003, Paul was listed as one of Toronto's top ten actors by Now Magazine. She is the recipient of the Tyrone Guthrie Award for her work with the Stratford Festival, and was Best Actress nominee at the International Black Film Festival for her performance in the film Banyan. She played a leading role in Charles Officer's Genie-nominated film Short Hymn, Silent War, featured at the 2004 Sundance Film Festival. More recently, Paul played a young Nelson Mandela in the Toronto production of the screenplay In the Freedom of Dreams: The Story of Nelson Mandela.

Paul's production credits include founding Ngozika Productions, which showcases film and TV projects from an Afro-Canadian perspective. In addition to being co-producer of the Tonya Williams Gospel Jubilee, Paul served as the creative director, associate producer, story editor and as a writer on the Gemini-nominated series Lord Have Mercy! (2003). Paul was a participant of Talent Lab, a four-day program for emerging filmmakers interested in mobile movie filmmaking.

Following a run of the theatre production Da Kink in My Hair, Ngozi co-created, executive produced, and starred in the television series of the same name (2007-2009).

In 2015, Paul's The Emancipation of Ms. Lovely—which she penned and in which she starred—was nominated for six Dora awards and won Outstanding New Play. This tale weaves Paul's personal stories with the story of Sarah Baartman (aka The Venus Hottentot) in a transcontinental allegory on the black woman's multitudinous identity. Lovely prompted Toronto's Now Magazine to write, “The magnetic Paul holds every moment onstage in a fierce, funny and moving performance.” She currently has a docu-series on-air entitled Care for Color and is in development of The 1st Time Project, a multi-platform documentary exploring female sexuality from inter-generational and inter-cultural perspectives.

Paul raises awareness for social issues such as domestic violence and homophobia within the West Indian community. In 2005, she was a celebrity cast member for the Toronto performance of The Vagina Monologues with proceeds helping local organizations that assist women in abusive relationships. Paul has been a global ambassador for Because I'm A Girl and the Stephen Lewis Foundation.

== Works ==
=== Stage ===
Year	Title	Role	Produced By
2010	Fernando Krapp Wrote Me This Letter	Performer – Julia	Canadian Stage
2015	The Watershed	Performer	Crow's Theatre and Porte Parole
2015	The Emancipation of Ms. Lovely	Performer, Playwright	Ngozika Productions and Pandemic Theatre
2016	The Watershed	Performer	Crow's Theatre and Porte Parole
2017	The Emancipation of Ms. Lovely	Performer, Playwright	Crow's Theatre and Emancipation Arts
2017	A&R Angels	Performer	Crow's Theatre
2018	Love and Information	Performer	Canadian Stage

=== Television ===
Year	Title	Writer	Producer	Performer	Role	Notes
2001	Leap Year			Yes	Female Assistant	Episode 1.20
2004	Lord Have Mercy!		Yes			
2007-2009	Da Kink in My Hair	Yes	Yes	Yes	Starr	4 episodes: "The Flesh is Weak" "Tangled Web" "Deranged Marriage" and "Backsliding"
2008	Embracing Da Kink			Yes	Herself	TV documentary
2011	The Hour			Yes	Herself	Episode 8.31
2013	Katie Chats			Yes	Herself	
2015	Care for Color	Yes		Yes	Herself	
2020	FreeUp! The Emancipation Day Special	Yes	Yes	Yes	Host	

=== Film ===
Year	Title	Director	Writer	Producer	Performer	Role	Notes
2002	Short Hymn, Silent War				Yes	Ruth	
2004	Da Kink in My Hair			Yes	Starr	TV movie	
2007	Talk To Me				Yes	Susan	
2011	The First Time	Yes		Yes			
2012	Night Light			Yes	Yes	Friend	
2018	The Mission				Yes	Justice	
