= Regent Park =

Coordinates: 43°39′42″N 79°21′54″W

- Neighbourhood
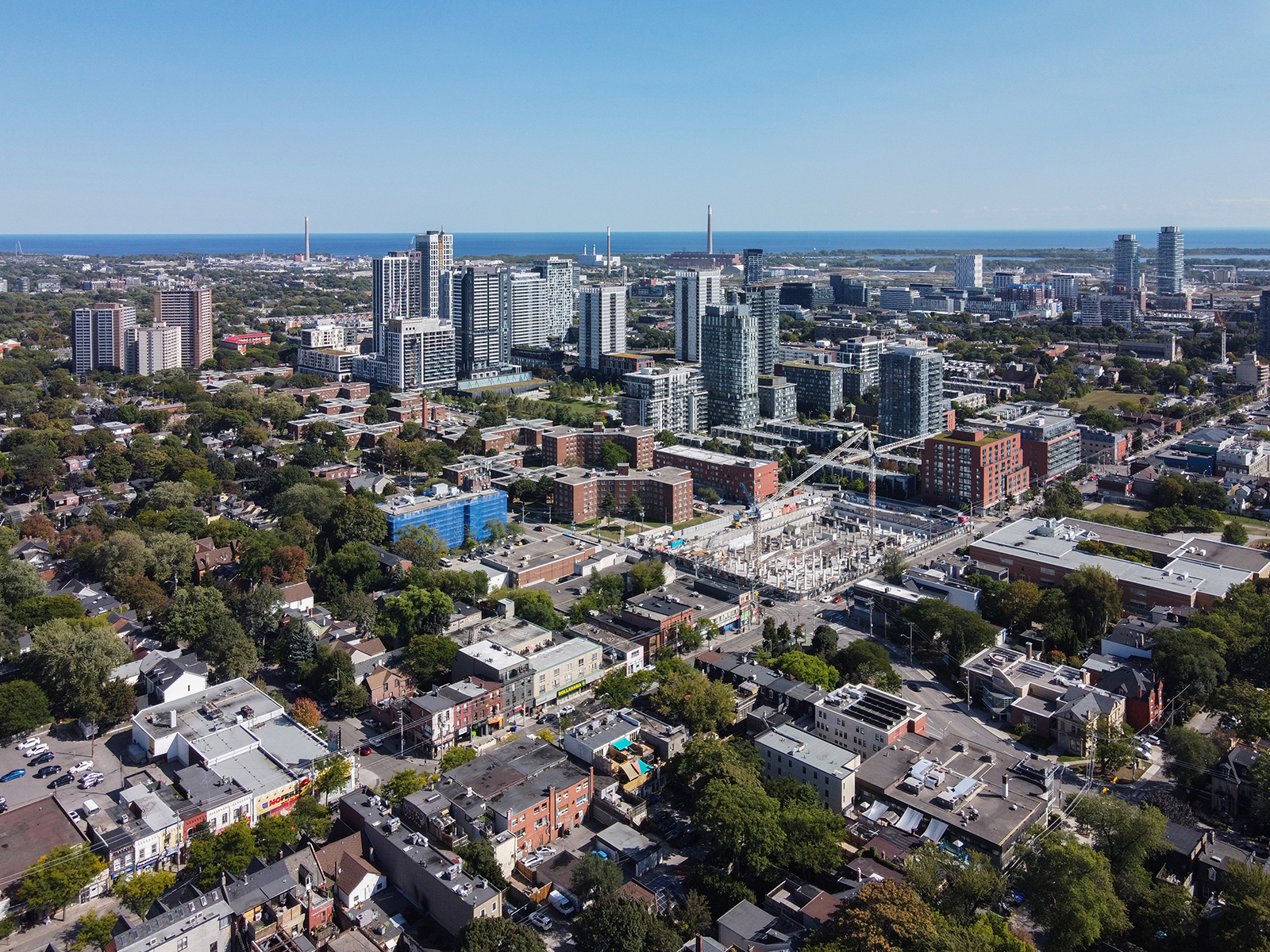
- Aerial view of Regent Park in 2023 with the redevelopment project Daniels on 365 Parliament Street seen under construction

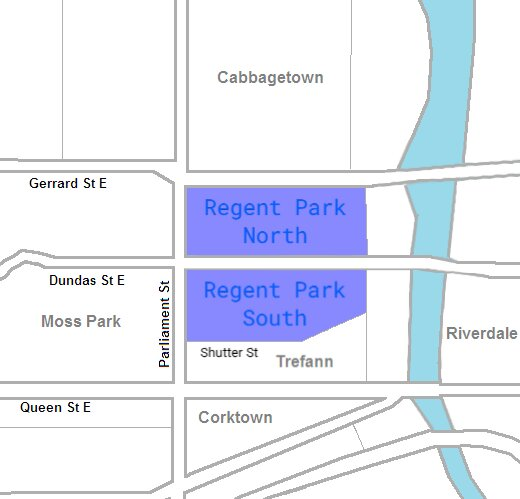
- Location of North and South Regent Park within Toronto
- Country: Canada
- Province: Ontario
- City: Toronto
- Redeveloped: ca 1940s

Regent Park is a neighbourhood located in downtown Toronto, Ontario built in the late 1940s as a public housing project managed by Toronto Community Housing. It sits on what used to be a significant part of the Cabbagetown neighbourhood and is bounded by Gerrard Street East to the north, River Street to the east, Shuter Street to the south and Parliament Street to the west. Regent Park's residential dwellings, prior to the ongoing redevelopment, were entirely social housing and covered all of the 69 acres (280,000 m^{2}) which comprise the community. The original neighbourhood was razed in the process of creating Regent Park. The nickname Cabbagetown is now applied to the remaining historical area north and west of the housing project, which has experienced considerable gentrification since the 1960s and 1970s.

== History ==
Regent Park—and adjoining areas of the Old City's east end—were home to some of Toronto's historic slum districts in the early 1900s. Most residents of the area were poor and working-class people of British and Irish descent, along with smaller numbers of continental European Jewish and Macedonian immigrants. Concern over crime and social problems in the area, as well as substandard housing, led to plans for affordable housing during the Second World War. These plans came to fruition soon after the end of the war, when the Regent Park North public housing project was approved in 1947. Families began to move into Regent Park North in 1949, but construction continued into the 1950s. The last families moved into Regent Park North in 1957. In subsequent years, more public housing units were built in Toronto, including Regent Park South, which was completed in 1960. The high-rise portion was designed by Page and Steele while the spartan row house and walk-up apartments were designed by John Edward Hoare.

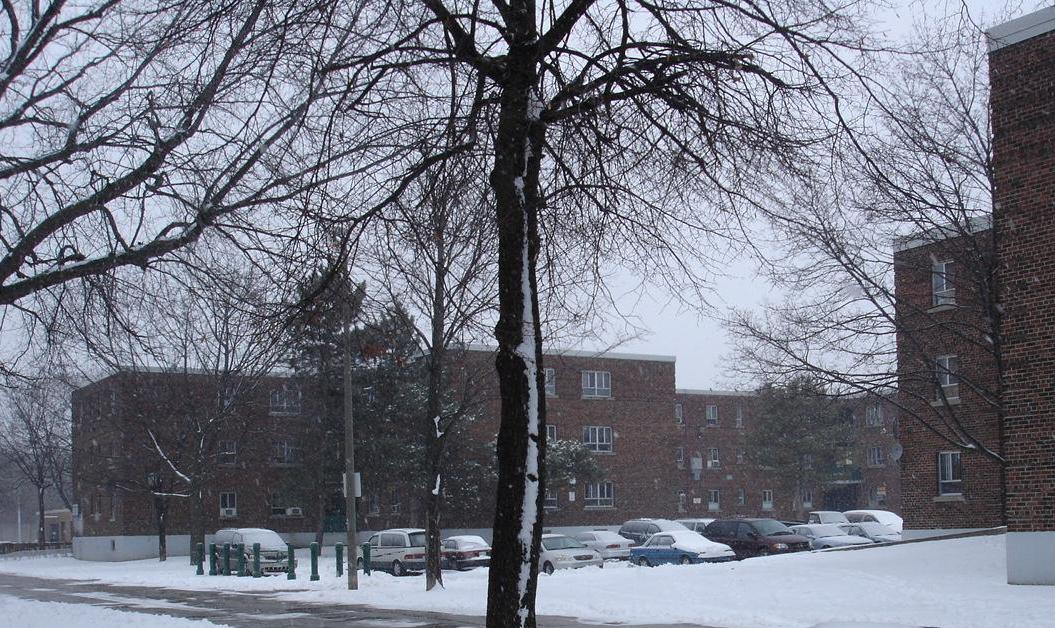
Regent Park was a social housing project, developed after the Second World War.

Although Regent Park had been designed to alleviate the area's substandard housing, crime, and social problems, these issues soon reemerged. By the mid-1960s, for example, there were complaints about the housing projects falling into a state of disrepair. Changes to the Canadian immigration system in the 1960s led to an influx of multicultural and multiethnic immigrants into the country. Some of these people, including immigrants from the Caribbean, China and Southeast Asia, settled in Regent Park in the 1960s and 1970s, changing the ethnic and racial composition of the neighbourhood. Meanwhile, the area continued to have a reputation of crime. In the early 2000s, a new redevelopment plan for Regent Park was implemented. The plan in question called for Regent Park to be redeveloped as a mixed-income neighbourhood. Because of the area's proximity to the downtown core, it is potentially high value real estate. The neighbourhood's ethnic composition has changed between 2001 and 2016. In 2001, the neighbourhood was 22% Black, 21.8% South Asian, 19.5% European, 14.1% Chinese, 10.6% Southeast Asian and 3.4% Latin American. By the 2016 census, Europeans had become the largest group, while the presence of visible minority groups declined. The neighbourhood in 2016 was 28% European, 25.7% South Asian, 13.6% Black, 12.5% Chinese and 3.7% Southeast Asian. In Regent Park, the median household income in 2016 was $42,369, although there was a decrease in this income range as compared to 2011. This is lower than the median household income for Toronto at $65,829. As well, the Regent Park neighbourhood has a higher percentage of households without income (5.9%) compared to the City of Toronto average (4.7%) and 44.4% of households are at or below the poverty level, compared to 20.2% for the city average.

=== Redevelopment ===
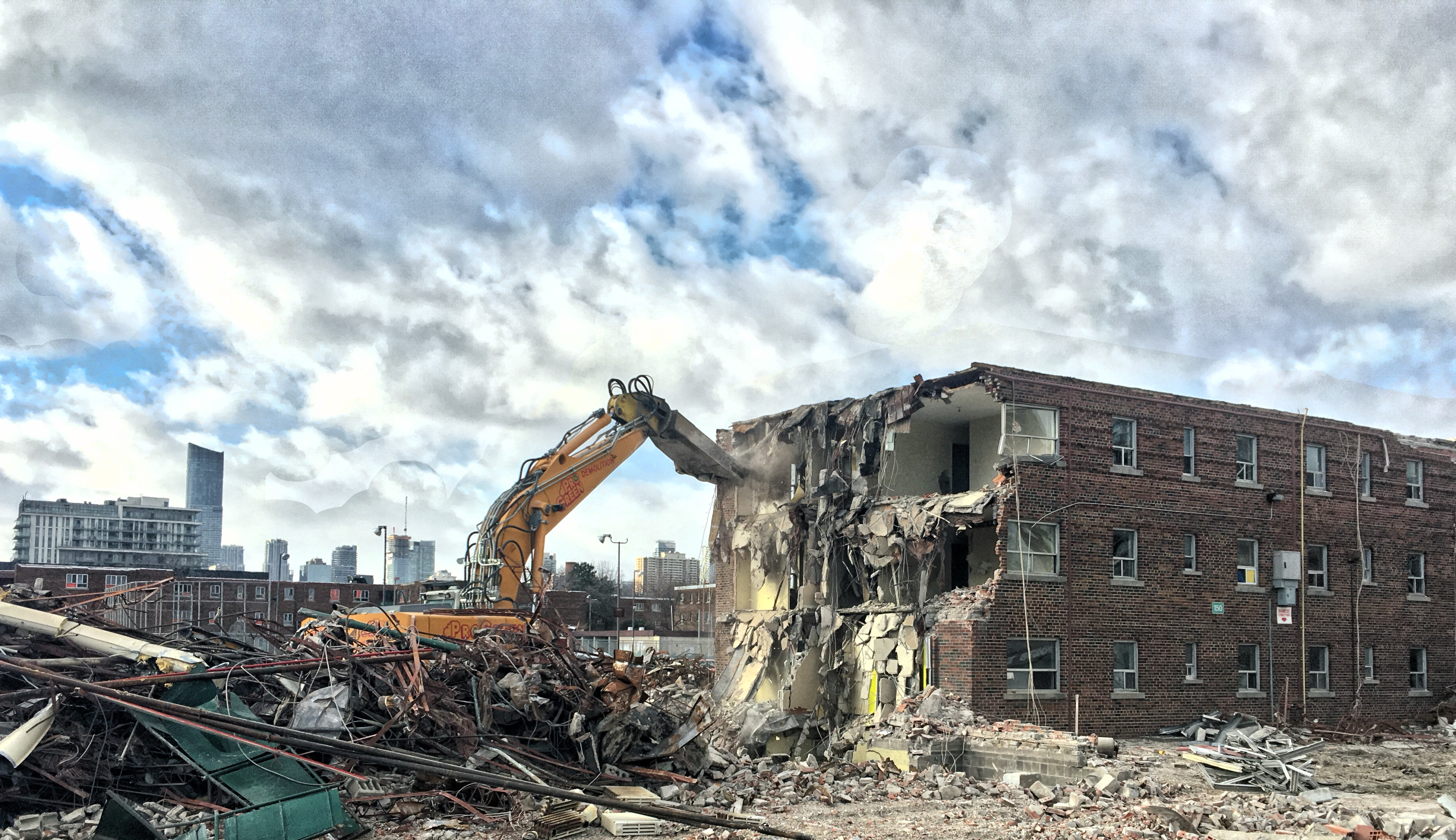
Demolition of residences in Regent Park. In 2005, the City approved the Regent Park Revitalization Plan, which seeks to replace the rapidly aging social housing units in the area.

More than a half-century old, the Regent Park projects were aging rapidly and in need of costly repairs. The city government developed a plan to demolish and rebuild Regent Park over the next many years, with the first phase having started in the fall of 2005. The addition of market units on site will double the number of units in Regent Park. Former street patterns will be restored and housing will be designed to reflect that of adjacent neighbourhoods (including Cabbagetown and Corktown) in order to end Regent Park's physical isolation from the rest of the city. In support of the Clean and Beautiful City campaign by former Toronto Mayor David Miller and to further the goal of renewing architecture in all Toronto Community Housing projects, an architectural competition was held for the design of the first apartment building in the complex. Toronto-based architectsAlliance was selected winner of the competition, with a modern glass point tower set on top of a red-brick podium structure in their proposal. While phase two had not yet been completed, the third stage of the revitalization plan began in May 2014, which will include newer or updated facilities. The revitalization plan has five phases. Phase two of the revitalization plan was completed in 2018 with the third phase set to be completed by 2023/2024.

=== Evolution from a transitional community to a residential community ===
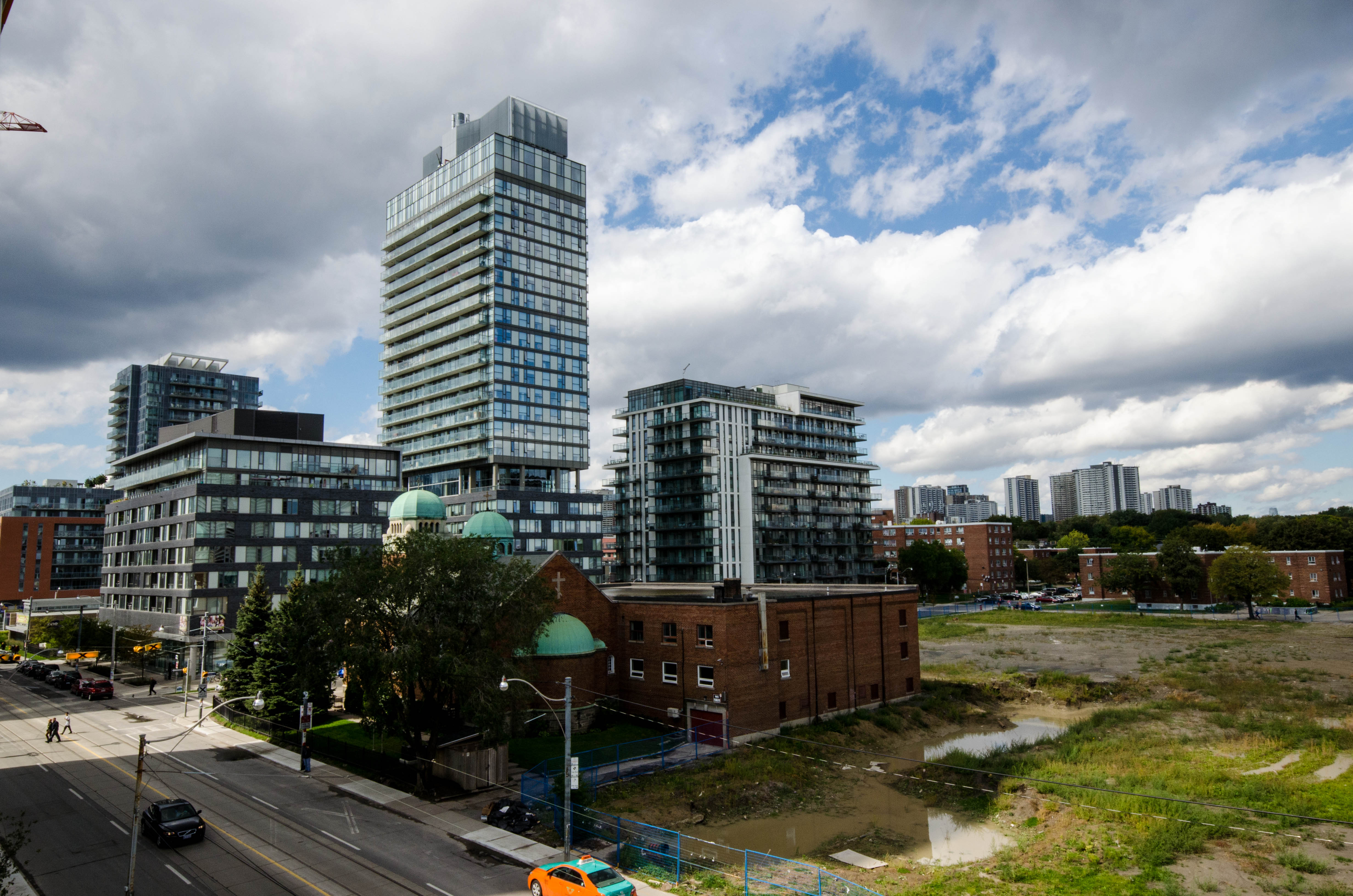
View of Regent Park undergoing redevelopment from Dundas Street in 2012 (Sts. Cyril and Methody Macedonian-Bulgarian Church in the foreground).

Regent Park was designed as a transitional community. It was to house people experiencing financial difficulties, or socioeconomic adjustment support. Most residents were on social assistance and working residents paid rent proportional to their income (average total income of individuals in 2010 was $38,714). In the last two decades Regent Park has also become an immigrant community, as immigrants facing difficulties settling in Canada end up living there. Thus, the community is always viewed and administered as a transitional community. This contributed to the concentration of a socially marginalized population and various social ills of Regent Park. In particular, a transitional community failed to generate the awareness, interest and commitment of its residents to invest in the development and sustainability of a higher quality of life.

== Culture ==
Various community groups, including the Salvation Army, have been highly active in promoting a positive sense of community and community representation, and in pursuing a higher quality of life. The CRC (formerly the Christian Resource Centre), which has operated since 1965, offers healthy meals, free clothing, showers and laundry facilities, housing supports, drop-in, life skills and food skills programs. Additionally, they provide the only not-for-profit social housing in Regent Park. Every year, they host Taste of Regent Park in the Big Park, with a pay-what-you-can community catered meal, local vendors and live entertainment. Another such organization is Regent Park Focus Youth Media Arts Centre, which "uses media technology as a tool to employ young people, enhance resiliency, bridge information gaps, increase civic engagement, promote health and effect positive change." Community Development is a program of the Regent Park Community Health Centre that promotes "individual health and the health of the community by addressing the two principal social determinants of health: education and income." Moreover, there are various cultural associations such as Regent Park Tamil Cultural Association, which aim to promote intra and inter cultural development and exchange and to foster a healthier community.

=== Neighbourhood characteristics ===
The majority of the buildings in Regent Park are owned and operated by Toronto Community Housing, the public low-income housing administrator in Toronto. Regent Park is the "Community Housing Unit 27" managed by TCHC and its manager is Ade Davies.

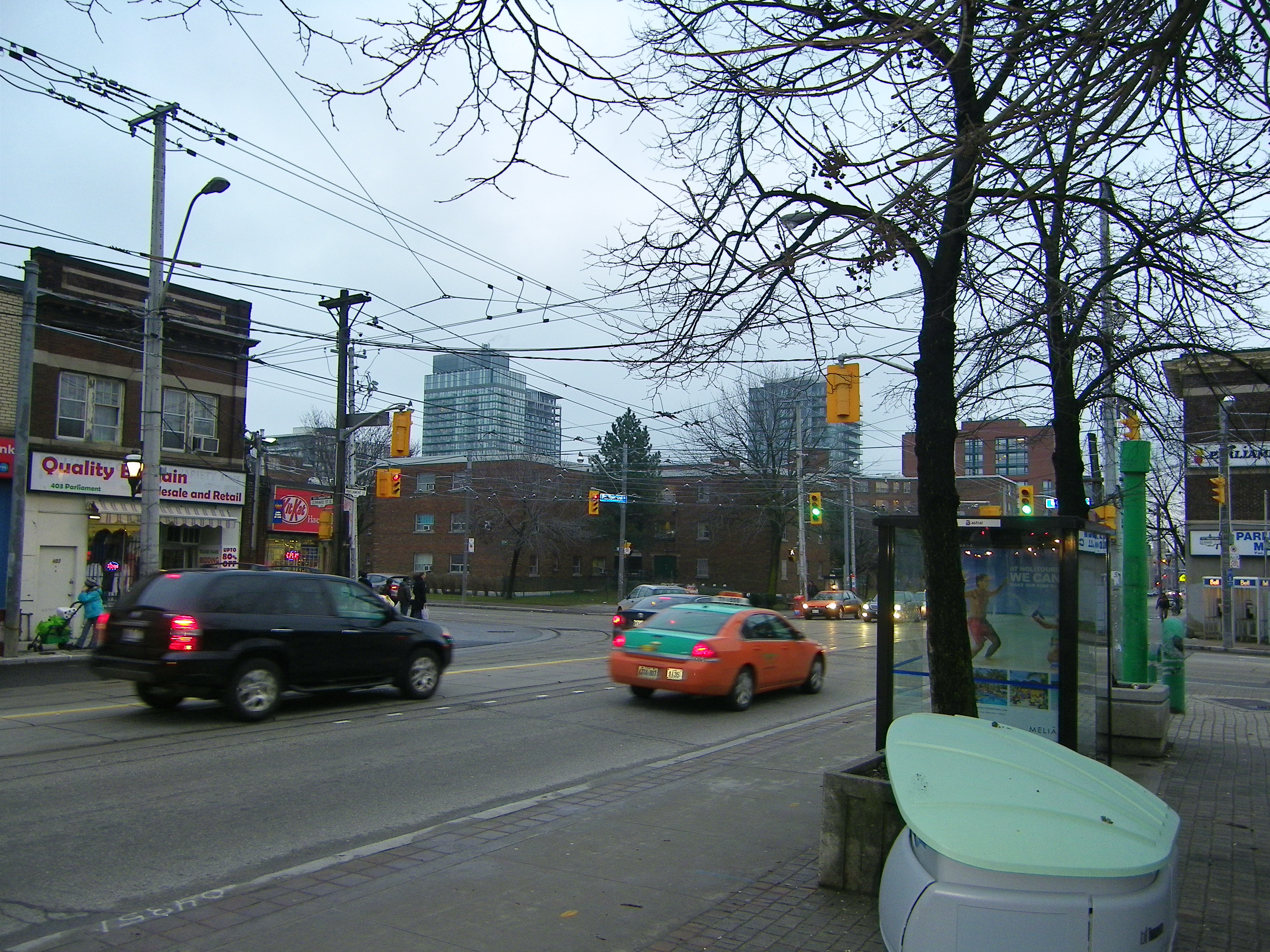
The intersection of Gerrard and Parliament Street, looking towards Regent Park. Both roads serve as boundary markers for Regent Park.

Most units are low rise apartment units bounded by Gerrard Street, Parliament Street, Dundas Street and River Street. The units are three-storey brick buildings with central balconies. On the south side of Dundas Street the housing consists of five high-rise apartment towers with two-storey townhomes on the east and west sides.

== Demographics ==
Regent Park has long been recognized as one of the lower-income neighbourhoods in the downtown Toronto area. There is a higher representation of visible minorities, refugees, immigrants and Indigenous people in the neighbourhood compared to neighboring areas. It experiences a higher rate of violence, crime, drug abuse and social ills compared to many other Toronto communities. Regent Park has a reputation for poverty in Toronto. In 2016, median income in part of Regent Park was $42,369, an increase from $22,268 in 2011. The neighbourhood's Census Tract (5350030.00) has experienced a significant shift in income structure between the 2006 Census, and 2011 National Household Survey. In the 2006 Census, 61.1% of residents earned less than $20,000 annually. However, by 2011, such low-income residents only constituted 40.4% of residents. By 2016, that number dropped further to 35.2% of residents. The number of those earning more than $60,000 has tripled from in those years, representing 25.6% of the population in 2011. Although a significant portion of residents making less than $20,000, since revitalization, the neighbourhood has become home to a growing number of high-earning residents. This can be explained by a number of potential causes. Either the historical residents have experienced increasing incomes, low-income residents can no longer afford housing in the neighbourhood and are experiencing displacement, or (most likely) owing to the nearly doubling in total residential units in the neighbourhood, the proportion of low-income residents has decreased as a function of the overall increase in residents. The neighbourhood in 2016 was 28% European, 25.7% South Asian, 13.6% Black, 12.5% Chinese and 3.7% Southeast Asian. The poverty rate has dropped to 44.4% in 2016 from a high of 73% in 1996.

== Government ==
Canada consists of 338 electoral districts and Regent Park is located in the Toronto Centre riding. For city administration, each district is divided into two city wards. Regent Park is located in Ward 28.

Regent Park Political Representation
People Representatives in Government	Member of Toronto City Council	Chris Moise
People Representatives in Government	Member of Provincial Parliament (MPP)	Kristyn Wong-Tam
People Representatives in Government	Member of (Federal) Parliament (MP)	Evan Solomon

In 2002, Toronto City Councillors recognized the need for increased tenant participation in the day-to-day management of housing. As a result, Toronto Community Housing Corporation (TCHC) initiated the Tenant Participation System (TPS). The first election for TPS was held in 2003. The tenant representatives were volunteers representing a constant number of adjacent units. Overall the formal mechanism set up to give tenants voice in the day-to-day management of the Regent Park had a positive impact. For instance, lighting in Regent Park has improved as a direct result of the TPS representatives requests. However, the mechanism developed for the whole of Toronto's various housing communities need to adopt to local conditions in order to meet the needs of the Regent Park residents more effectively.

=== Emergency services ===
The Toronto Fire Services station 325 is Regent Park's fire station, located at 475 Dundas Street East. The Toronto Police Service – 51 Division is responsible for the community. It was located in the community at 30 Regent Street, but has since been moved to nearby 51 Parliament Street. As late as 2001, the relation between some residents and police was confrontational. Paramedics serving the Regent Park area are deployed from Toronto Emergency Medical Services Station 40, an Advanced Life Support and Basic Life Support station staffed with Level II (Advanced Care Paramedic) and Level I (Primary Care Paramedic) crews located at 58 Richmond Street East.

== Education ==
Regent Park is served by two public libraries. The Toronto Public Library Parliament branch is located at the corner of Gerrard and Parliament streets and houses a special local history archive about Regent Park. The other nearby library is the Riverdale branch located at the junction of Gerrard Street and Broadview Avenue. In addition, the Children's Book Bank is a small nonprofit that provides free books and literacy support, located at 350 Berkeley Street (at Gerrard). The Regent Park Child Care Centre may be found at St Bartholomew's Church, which cares for infants and toddlers.

=== Public education ===
There are four Toronto-based school boards that provides public education for the city, including the neighbourhood of Regent Park. Two of the four Toronto-based school boards teach primarily in English, the secular Toronto District School Board (TDSB), and the separate Toronto Catholic District School Board (TCDSB). The institutions operated by the other two Toronto-based school boards, the secular Conseil scolaire Viamonde, and separate Conseil scolaire catholique MonAvenir, teach primarily in French. However, neither French-language school board operates a school in Regent Park. The following TDSB elementary schools operated in Regent Park:

- Nelson Mandela Park Public School on Shuter Street - first opened 1853 as Park Public School (current building built 1914-1917) and renamed in 2001 when Park Public School and Park Senior Public School merged after the late South African President Nelson Mandela; school serves Junior Kindergarten to Grade 8.
- Lord Dufferin Public School on Parliament Street
- Regent Park/Duke of York Junior Public School on Regent Street - opened 1958 as Regent Park PS and merged with Duke of York PS (located at 14 Pembroke Street and now ecole publique Gabrielle Roy of the Conseil scolaire Viamonde) during the period of 1977-1980. This school was demolished in 2015 and a new Toronto District Catholic School will be built at a future date.

== Transportation ==
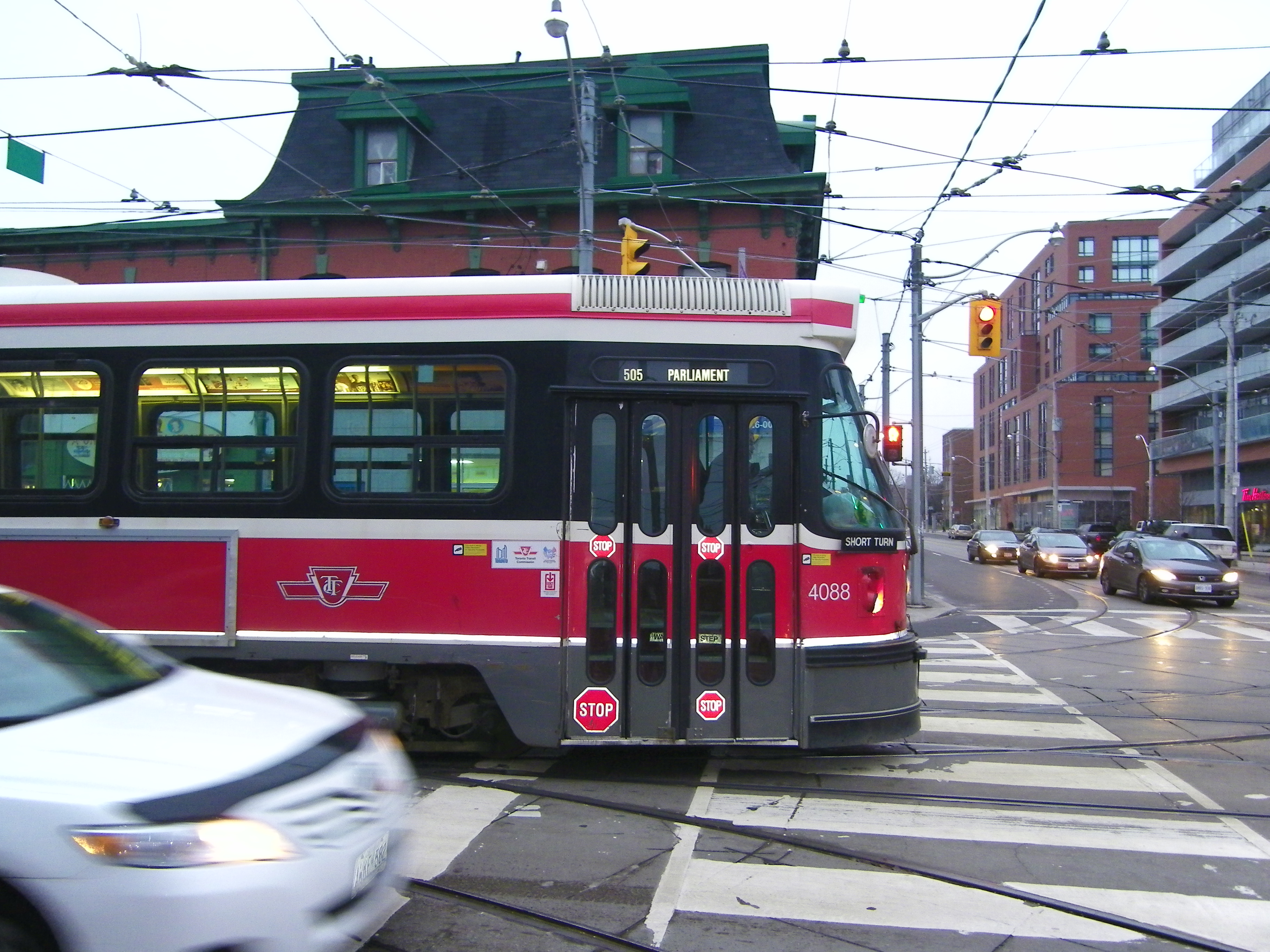
The 505 Dundas TTC streetcar as it enters Regent Park. The 505 is one of three streetcar lines to serve the area.

Regent Park is served by several Toronto Transit Commission streetcar routes: 501, 505, 506; and by the 65 Parliament bus route. The streetcars provide quick access to the Yonge subway line, while the 65 Parliament bus provides access to the Bloor-Danforth line. The Don Valley Parkway is a major highway that runs to the east of the neighbourhood.

== Academic study ==
Regent Park has attracted the attention of various social science scholars and media. Scholar and activist Dr. Sean Purdy has written his thesis based on his research about Regent Park. His paper "Ripped Off" By the System: Housing Policy, Poverty and Territorial Stigmatization in Regent Park Housing Project, 1951–1991 provides valuable insights about Regent Park. The recent Regent Park Revitalization Plan is also viewed and undertaken as a pilot Canadian social re-engineering effort. The federal and local governments view the plan as means to establish best practices and bench marks. Although such enthusiasm adds to the momentum of the revitalization plan, the Regent Park history warrants caution as not to repeat or reproduce the shortcomings of its past.

=== List of academic literature ===
- August, Martine. "Challenging the Rhetoric of Stigmatization: The Benefits of Concentrated Poverty in Toronto's Regent Park." Environment and Planning A: Economy and Space, Vol. 46, no. 6 (2014), pp 1317–1333.
- Gosine, Kevin & Faisal Islam. “’It’s Like we’re One Big Family’: Marginalized Young People, Community, and the Implications for Urban Schooling.” School Community Journal, Vol.24, no.2 (2014), pp. 33-61.
- Purdy, Sean. "Framing Regent Park: the National Film Board of Canada and the Construction of Outcast Spaces in the Inner City, 1953 and 1994," Media, Culture and Society (UK), Vol.27, no. 4 (July 2005).
- Purdy, Sean. "By the People, For the People: Tenant Organizing in Toronto’s Regent Park Housing Project in the 1960s and 1970s," Journal of Urban History, Vol. 30, no. 4 (May 2004), pp. 519-548.
- Luisa Veronis. "Exploring the Margin: The Borders between Regent Park and Cabbagetown"

=== Documentaries ===
- Farewell Oak Street by Grant McLean
- Invisible City by Hubert Davis
- Return to Regent Park by Bay Weyman
- A Way Out by Christene Browne

== Notable residents ==
- Smoke Dawg, rapper
- Mustafa Ahmed, also known as Mustafa the Poet, poet, singer, songwriter and filmmaker
- Ahmed Hussen, Canadian lawyer and politician. He is MP in the Canadian Parliament, representing the York South—Weston riding as a member of the Liberal Party of Canada.
- Glen Metropolit, professional hockey player
- Point Blank, hip hop group
- Puffy L'z, rapper

== In popular culture ==
The neighbourhood is the setting for the play Kim's Convenience.

== See also ==
- List of neighbourhoods in Toronto
