= Hardwood (disambiguation) =

The term hardwood is used to describe wood from non-monocot angiosperm trees. It can also refer to:

- Hardwood flooring
- (slang) A Basketball court
- Hardwood (film), a 2004 documentary film
- Hardwood Records, a Canadian record label
- Hardwood Classics, a television series
- Hardwood timber production

Hardwood should not be confused with the term 'heartwood'.
