= Aruba (film) =

- Film poster
- Directed by: Hubert Davis
- Screenplay by: Hubert Davis
- Produced by: Hubert Davis; Sam McLaren; David Miller
- Starring: A.J. Saudin; Devon Bostick; Soo Garay
- Cinematography: David Tennant
- Edited by: Hubert Davis
- Music by: Michael White; Fraser Macdougall
- Production companies: Brown Entertainment; Shine Films; Sienna Films
- Release date: January 19, 2006 (Sundance Film Festival)
- Running time: 11 minutes
- Country: Canada
- Language: English

Aruba is a 2006 Canadian coming-of-age dramatic short film and the fiction debut of director Hubert Davis. It was his first major work after his Academy Award-nominated film Hardwood.

Davis was inspired to create the film after having worked with "at risk kids" in Vancouver, and toward his film addressing issues found within Black communities, he "advocates the need for 'intelligent urban films' that offer a different perspective from the conventions of urban comedies and Black Entertainment TV."

The film has been archived in the National Film Board of Canada African-Canadian Issues Collection.

== Premise ==
Milan (A.J. Saudin) is an 11-year-old boy who dreams about escaping a violent home life. When his parents fight or take drugs, or when bullies pick on him in school, he finds peace in contemplating a postcard with an idyllic picture of the island of Aruba, and imagines himself in that faraway place as a way to survive.

== Cast ==
- A.J. Saudin as Milan
- Devon Bostick as Mark
- Soo Garay as Mom
- Patricia Fagen as Teacher
- Nicki Whitely as Student
- Chris McCawley as Student
- Megan Dexter as Bully #2
- Drew Gardiner as Bully #3

== Release ==
=== Screenings ===
The film premiered at the Sundance Film Festival in January 2006, and then screened at several festivals, including the 2006 Toronto International Film Festival, the 2006 Palm Springs International ShortFest, the 2007 Seattle International Film Festival, and the 2008 Kansas City Jubilee Film Festival. Of its screening at the Vancouver International Film Festival, Mark Harris of Straight.com called the film "desperately touching".

=== DVD ===
Aruba was released by Paradox on January 21, 2008, as part of the compilation DVD "And the Winner Is...", a collection of multiple award-winning short films which also included the films Ryan (2004), The Danish Poet (2006), Strange Invaders (2002), Walking (1969), Hardwood (2004), and My Grandmother Ironed the King's Shirts (1999).

== Reception ==
The National Film Board of Canada wrote that the film is one about salvation and "a reflection of a part of our Canadian landscape too often ignored". They write that the film deals with children whose parents come from different cultures, and is reflective "of a new Canada" by its offering "a new perspective into the Canadian culture" through its approach on how race and poverty disconnect from the mainstream.

The Manitoba Library Association's CM Magazine wrote that the film reflected "the diversity of worlds and cultures that are a part of the inner city", through its "choosing to highlight the effects of poverty, violence, and abuse on one urban family". They offered that the film's strength was through limiting its dialogue and relying on visual narrative to allow "viewers to bring their thoughts and feelings to the images." They recommend it for classroom use to open discussion on "topics including bullying, poverty, drug abuse, domestic violence, and the struggles of many inner-city children," and offer grade 7-12 study guide.

In a retrospective of Hubert Davis' short works, Aruba, Truth and Hardwood screened at the Toronto's NFB Mediatheque in November 2011.

=== Awards and nominations ===
- 2006, Won the Panavision Grand Jury Award at Palm Springs International ShortFest
