= Invisible City =

Invisible City may refer to:

- Invisible City (film), a 2009 documentary film by Hubert Davis
- Invisible City (TV series), a Brazilian fantasy web television series by Carlos Saldanha
- "Invisible City", a song by Scottish band Primal Scream
- Invisible City, a podcast from Jennifer Keesmaat

== See also ==
- Invisible Cities, a novel by Italian writer Italo Calvino
- The Invisible City of Kitezh, a 1907 Russian opera by Nikolai Rimsky-Korsakov
