= The Skin We're In (book) =

2020 book

- Author: Desmond Cole
- Language: English
- Published: 2020
- Publisher: Doubleday Canada
- Publication place: Canada
- ISBN: 9780385686358
- OCLC: 1189770571
- LC Class: F1035.A1 C63 2020

The Skin We're In: A Year of Black Resistance and Power is a book by Desmond Cole published by Doubleday Canada in 2020.

The Skin We're In describes the struggle against racism in Canada during the year 2017, chronicling Cole's role as an anti-racist activist and the impact of systemic racism in Canadian society. Among the events it discusses are the aftermath of the assault of Dafonte Miller in late 2016 and Canada 150. The work argues that Canada is not immune to the anti-Black racism that characterizes American society.

Due to an error by the publisher, the initial printing of the book's cover did not include the word "Black" in the subtitle. The mistake was later corrected.

The book won the Toronto Book Award for 2020. In 2021, the book was nominated for the Shaughnessy Cohen Prize for Political Writing.
