= Regent Park Revitalization Plan =

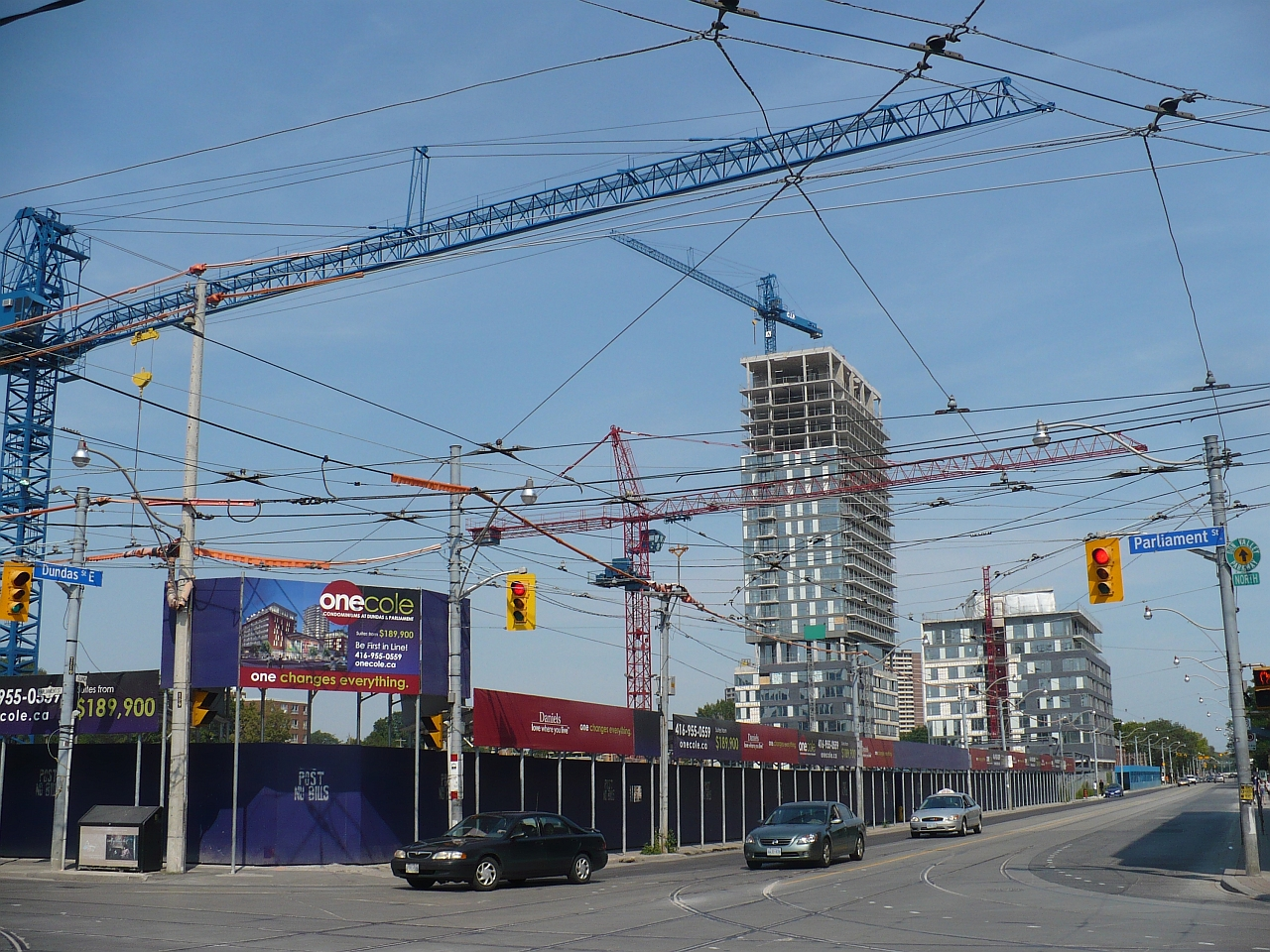
Construction in Toronto's Regent Park in 2008

The Regent Park Revitalization Plan is an initiative begun in 2005 by the City of Toronto with fellow development, government, and community partners, with a focus on rebuilding the Toronto neighbourhood of Regent Park for 12,500 residents over a 15- to 20-year period. The project entails transforming what was once solely a social housing development into a self-sufficient, mixed-income, multi-use community.

== Background ==
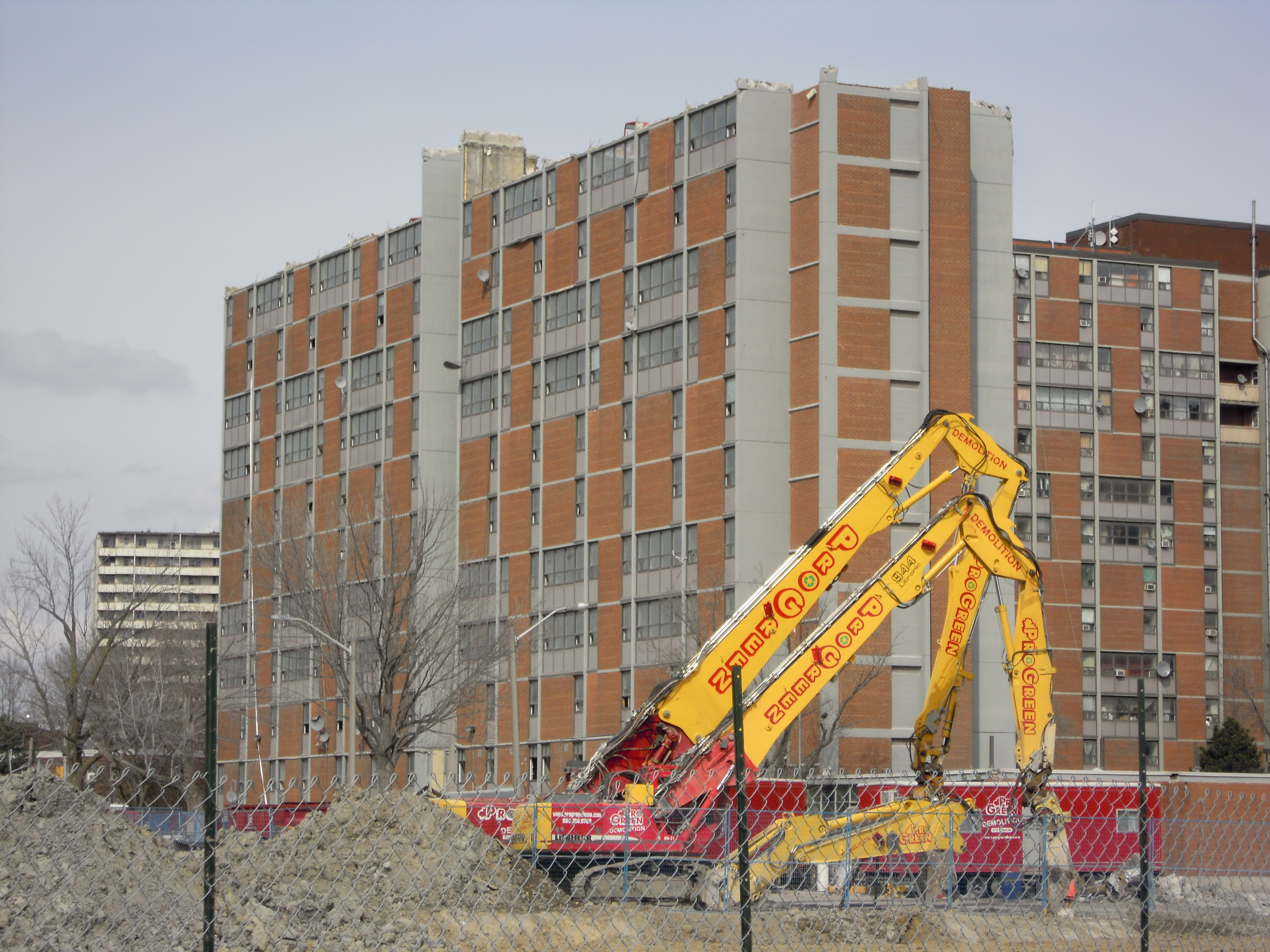
Phase two included the demolition of the Peter Dickinson tower

When the community of Regent Park was originally built in 1948, there was limited access to any of Toronto's modes of public transportation. Since the neighbourhood was built to generate a strong sense of community, the area within the neighbourhood was mainly made up of smaller footpaths and small roads – not ideal for transportation and inclusion to the rest of the city. Over time the neighbourhood became isolated and displaced from the adjacent downtown core and grew a reputation as being one of Toronto's poorer, dangerous neighbourhoods. The plan to revitalize Regent Park is an initiative with the goal to alleviate the socio-economic gap that had been created and expanded over the last 60 years. Revitalization is meant to promote a full community upheaval by building community facilities as well as affordable housing and home ownership opportunities. A mixed-income, mixed-use community in Regent Park will presumably provide a positive socio-economic shift in a neighbourhood primarily ignored for decades. The new neighbourhood will consist of a mix of rental and condominium buildings, townhouses as well as commercial space with community facilities, active parks and open spaces.

In 2005, The Daniels Corporation partnered with Toronto Community Housing to re-develop 53 of the 69 acres of Toronto’s Regent Park. Creative agency Bob's Your Uncle was retained to manage the rebranding of the neighbourhood and the branding and marketing of the various buildings that comprised the first three phases of the development.

Currently in phase 3 of construction, Regent Park is beginning to see the physical and social shift towards a well-kept, functioning mixed-use neighbourhood. The revitalization plan is being funded by a public-private partnership including government partners such as the City of Toronto as well as the Daniels Corporation. On 11 September 2012, Gene Jones, the current president and CEO of Toronto Community Housing at the time, presented a proposal for phase three of construction for the Regent Park Revitalization Plan. The phase three proposal which would include the Regent Park Athletic Grounds, which would be paid for through a fundraising campaign with primary support from The MLSE Team Up Foundation. The proposed phase three would also introduce three new city streets to Toronto's downtown core, as well as more than 500 replacement rental social housing units and more than 2,000 market condominiums. New businesses would also be opened along Dundas Street, bringing services to the community and providing employment opportunities for neighbourhood residents.

== Goals ==
The original idea surrounding the revitalization plan was to transform an area of the city that was originally built to be solely a social housing development into a thriving up-and-coming mixed-income neighbourhood sparking a social, economic and cultural revival to the area. The physical transformation includes an implementation of diverse styles of sustainable architecture (a shift from red and gray social housing projects), expanding and reconnecting the road networks to the Toronto Transit Commission as well as new streets and alleys maintained by the city. It also means adding new parks, open space, retail locations, and a new arts complex. According to Toronto Housing, before revitalization there were 7,500 tenants living in 2,083 rent-geared-to-income (RGI) units.

=== Regent Park by the Numbers ===
- Replaced rent-geared-to-income (RGI) Units: 2,083 (over 1,800 in Regent Park and 226 in new buildings nearby)
- New Affordable Rental Units: Over 210 in Regent Park and 100 in new buildings nearby by the end of Phase 2. (Additional affordable rental units in future phases will be subject to funding availability.)
- Market Condominium Units: 5,400, including some affordable ownership opportunities
- Anticipated Project Length: 15–20 years
- Total Size: 69 acres
- A mix of townhomes and mid-rise and high-rise buildings
- Amenities: New amenities include the Daniels Spectrum, the Regent Park Aquatic Centre, the new Regent Park, and the Regent Park Athletic Grounds
- Retail Space: Freshco, Rabba, Rogers, Tim Hortons, RBC, Scotia Bank and Main Drug Mart have moved into newly created retail space

=== Relocation and return ===
One of the prominent claims made by Toronto Community Housing from the beginning of the revitalization plan was that all Regent Park residents who have been relocated due to construction are guaranteed a right to a new unit in the revitalized neighbourhood. This is meant to not displace the existing community and residents, but rather to add more residents to the existing community to maintain a sense of community. Toronto Community Housing pays for the tenants' moving and rental costs during their relocation, finding the correct intermediate and future place for them to live.

=== Daniels Spectrum ===
On 19 September 2012 Daniels Spectrum, the new Regent Park arts and cultural centre and one of the central points of the community rebuilding project, opened to a mass of representatives from the federal, provincial and municipal governments along with representatives of Artscape, The Daniels Corporation and Toronto Community Housing. Daniels Spectrum is seen as the centre point of the cultural regeneration of the neighbourhood and is home to seven arts and innovation non-profit organizations.

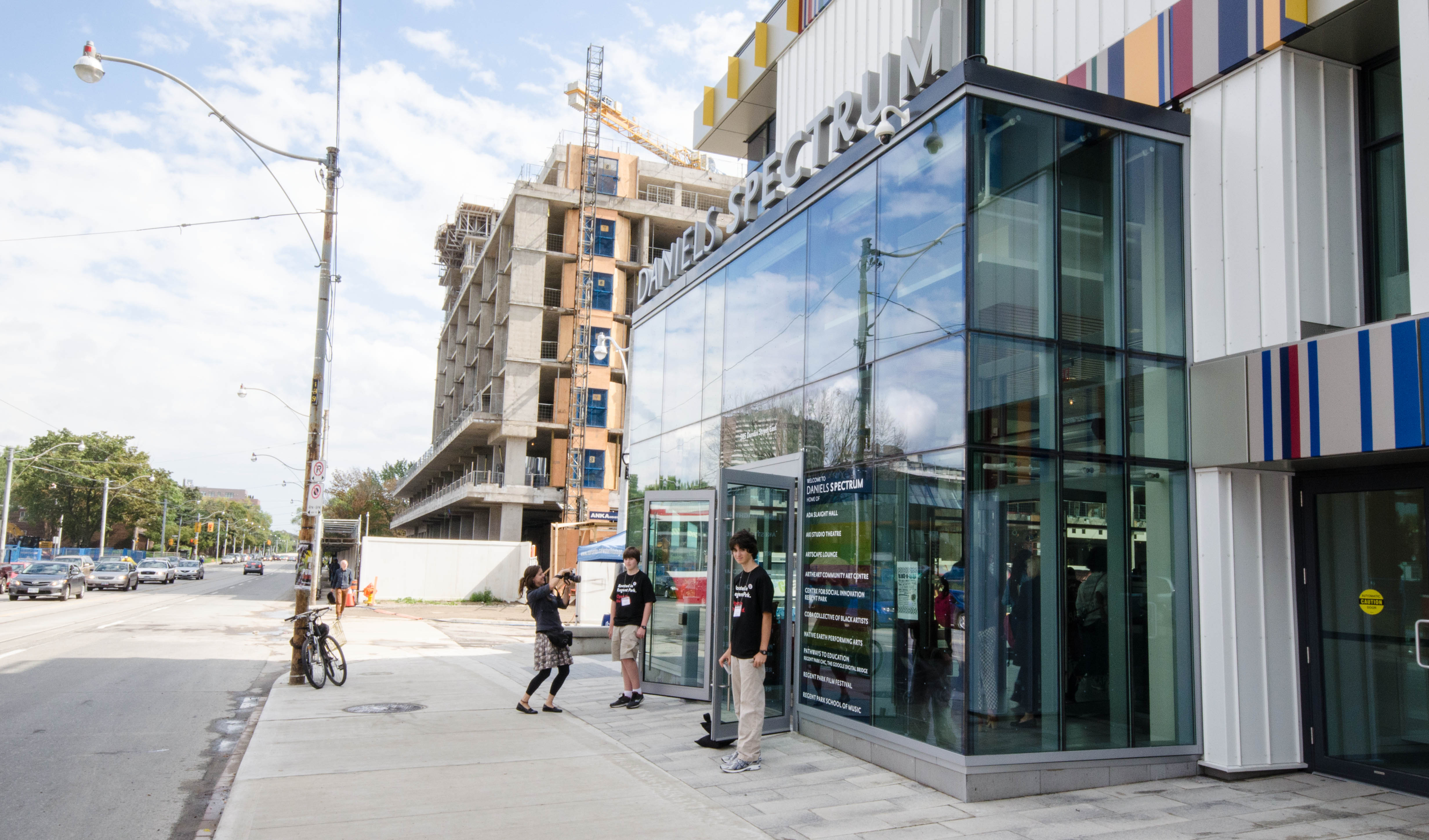
The Daniels Spectrum September 2012

The construction of Daniels Spectrum reinforces the revitalization plan's mission in that revitalizing a neighbourhood is not only an issue of providing affordable housing, but providing a vibrant community. In 2009, Toronto Community Housing, Artscape and the Daniels Corporation formed a joint venture—the Regent Park Arts Development—to develop and operate the centre in consultation with a community-based advisory committee.

== Public reaction and response ==
Toronto Community Housing makes a point to stay in close contact with the residents who are undergoing relocation and anyone who is affected by the construction. In the summer of 2012, residents were interviewed and asked about issues that needed to be improved on during the construction, and they asked for better communication with the tenants, improvement in the relocation process of old residents, as well as improved safety around the heavy construction areas.

In 2010, there was a lot of skepticism around the effectiveness of the community regeneration happening amidst the construction of a new neighbourhood. In response to a string of fatal shootings in the neighbourhood, the Toronto Police Department responded by implementing 24-hour patrol surveillance of the neighbourhood. At the time, the progress of the construction appeared to be waning and it made even those involved in the project skeptical.

The Toronto Open Doors Festival in the summer of 2012 provided all visitors with guided educational tours of the new buildings as well as an in-depth description of what was happening in the program. It was the first time the public was allowed to visit the new buildings in the community.

There has been criticism with regards to the size of the new subsidized housing units built. Most of the units are smaller than the predecessor units were. This design adversely affected large families, and it has made the displacement of the people even more problematic. Many community members are upset about how the relocation of people was handled, leaving many to believe that this revitalization was not done in the best interests of the people who originally lived, worked and grew up in the Regent Park area.

== See also ==
- Regent Park
- Toronto Community Housing
- Poverty in Canada
- Woodward's Building
- Politics of Toronto
