= Da Kink in My Hair =

Play written by Trey Anthony

Da Kink in My Hair is a play by Trey Anthony, which debuted at the Toronto Fringe Festival in 2001. The play's central character is Novelette, the Caribbean Canadian owner of Letty's, a Toronto hair salon. Novelette is forced to confront her goals and ideals in life when she receives news that her onetime boyfriend Cedric, who loaned her the money to open the salon, has died and his daughter Verena is demanding repayment of the loan.

The play subsequently expanded to Theatre Passe-Muraille in 2003, and was nominated for four Dora Awards. Mirvish Productions then underwrote a larger production at the Princess of Wales Theatre in 2005. The show has also been produced at the San Diego Repertory Theatre in San Diego, and at the Hackney Empire in London.

In 2022, TO Live and the Bluma Appel Theatre are slated to stage a 20th anniversary production of the play, to be directed by Weyni Mengesha.

== Television adaptations ==
A one-hour television pilot based on the play was produced in 2004 by VisionTV's Cultural Diversity Drama Competition. The pilot starred Sheryl Lee Ralph as Novelette, Shakira Harper as her daughter Michelle, Kim Roberts as Verena, Mimi Kuzyk as Novelette's friend and client Iris, Trey Anthony as Novelette's sister Joy, and Ngozi Paul, Jim Codrington and Richard Chevolleau as stylists working at Letty's.

A half-hour weekly series adaptation, Da Kink in My Hair, aired for two seasons on Global Television Network, beginning in the 2007–08 television season. A total of 26 episodes were produced. The series cast includes Ordena Stephens-Thompson, Trey Anthony, Ngozi Paul, Richard Fagon, and Conroy Stewart.
