= The Breach (website) =

Canadian news website

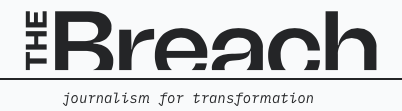
- Website type: News website
- Available in: English
- Owner: The Breach
- Editors: Martin Lukacs; Emma Paling; Cara McKenna
- Website: breachmedia.ca
- Commercial: No
- Launched: March 2021

The Breach is a Canadian news website launched on 10 March 2021 to provide reader- and viewer-supported reporting, analysis, and videos on issues such as racism, extremism, economic inequality, colonialism, and climate change.

The Breach is a successor to The Dominion, an independent, non-profit publication launched in 2003. Breach Media is a client of Indiegraf, a private media platform who chairs the Canadian Journalism Collective (CJC).

== Content ==
The Breach promises to provide "adversarial", investigative journalism that exposes injustices more vigorously than corporate newspapers or the CBC, Canada's public broadcaster. "We believe journalism can be credible while still open about its commitments: to inspire action, tell stories about people remaking society, and amplify visions of a new world to win together", The Breach announced on its website.

In Parliament, Elizabeth May of the Green Party cited The Breach to show close ties between the federal government and Canada's oil and gas industry, a subject the publication pursued in later stories. The CBC credited The Breach for reporting on the participation of Pierre Poilievre in cash-for-access fundraisers set up by lobbyists, despite his calling lobbyists 'useless'. The Walrus cited an article from The Breach on ties between Poilievre's Conservatives and Hindu nationalist groups supportive of India Prime Minister Narendra Modi, against the background of the government of India's interference in a 2022 leadership race.

== Contributors ==
Its contributors include:

- Desmond Cole
- Indigenous writer, lawyer, and professor Pamela Palmater
- journalist El Jones
- Linda McQuaig
- legal scholar Azeezah Kanji
- Avi Lewis
