= Short Hymn, Silent War =

- Directed by: Charles Officer
- Written by: Charles Officer; Tamai Kobayashi
- Produced by: Kate Kung; Sandy Reimer
- Starring: Ngozi Paul; Mpho Koaho; Karen Robinson
- Cinematography: Rion Gonzales
- Edited by: Ian Gardner
- Production company: Canadian Film Centre
- Distributed by: Mongrel Media
- Release date: 2002
- Country: Canada
- Language: English

Short Hymn, Silent War is a 2002 Canadian short drama film, directed by Charles Officer. The film centres on four Black Canadian women coping with an epidemic of gun violence in their community.

The film's cast includes Ngozi Paul, Mpho Koaho, Karen Robinson, Robert B. Kennedy, Bobby Manning, Ashley Archer, Elizabeth Vida and Mary Wright.

The film received a Genie Award nomination for Best Live Action Short Film at the 24th Genie Awards.

The film was later distributed as a bonus feature on the DVD release of Officer's feature film Nurse.Fighter.Boy.
