= Trey Anthony =

Canadian playwright and actor (born 1974)

- Born: February 18, 1974 (age 52); London, England
- Occupations: Playwright, actor, producer
- Writing career
- Genre: Comedy
- Notable work: Da Kink in My Hair
- Notable awards: NAACP Theatre Award (2007), Gemini Award (2008)
- Website: Trey Anthony

Trey Anthony (born February 18, 1974) is a British-born Canadian playwright, actor, and producer, best known for her award-winning play and television series Da Kink in My Hair. As a producer, she worked for the Women's Television Network and the Urban Women's Comedy Festival. She founded Trey Anthony Studios, a television and theatre production company dedicated to producing new works of theatre.

== Personal life ==
Born in London, England, to Jamaican parents, Anthony arrived in Canada at 12 years old with her mother. They lived in the working class district of Rexdale in Toronto before moving to suburban Brampton. Anthony's mother had left for Canada ahead of her, leaving her from the ages of 6 to 12 to be raised by her grandmother.

Anthony's grandmother had in turn left her mother in Jamaica when leaving for the UK. Anthony's grandmother had been part of the Domestic Scheme Act, allowing her to go to a first world country if she proved she had no family ties.

She has a brother, Darren Anthony, who is also a writer.

== Career ==
She is a regular on the Canadian comedy circuit. She began doing stand-up comedy during African Nubian Comedy Nights where she honed her comedic wit and timing. She soon became a crowd favourite and began writing and producing her own sketch comedy shows at Second City. These shows sold out monthly and Anthony moved her monthly shows to a bigger venue, growing her audience, and creating more demand for her theatrical work and projects.

She is a recipient of the prestigious Harry Jerome Award for the arts and the recipient of an Eve Ensler Award of the Arts.

In 2017, Anthony launched her new brand, Black Girl in Love, which features the first lifestyle planner/organizer geared at professional black woman and also includes merchandise, workshops and retreats.

She has performed at The Second City, the Urban Womyn's Comedy Festival and Toronto's St. Lawrence Centre for the Arts. She was also a writer and performer for Kenny Robinson's sketch comedy show After Hours with Kenny Robinson and a writer for The Chris Rock Show.

In 2017, her play How Black Mothers Say I Love You debuted at the Factory Theatre, Toronto.

In 2020, Anthony appeared in CBC Gem's Queer Pride Inside special.

=== 'Da Kink in My Hair ===
Her hit play and television series, 'Da Kink in My Hair, has received tremendous critical acclaim, and was named one of the top ten plays in Canadian theatrical history and the winner of four NAACP and received several Dora Mavor Moore Awards. Originally set as a one-woman show, 'Da Kink documents the lives of women in a Caribbean style Jamaican hair salon in Toronto.

Starting out at the Toronto French Festival in 2001 'Da Kink has been produced in California, New York, London, and was the first Canadian play to be produced at the Princess of Wales Theatre.

Anthony is the first Black Canadian woman to write and produce a television show on a major prime time Canadian network. A television series version of 'Da Kink in My Hair began airing in 2007 and Anthony was a cast member before the show was cancelled in 2009.

=== Trey Anthony Studios ===
Trey Anthony Studios was founded by Anthony with the mission to "produce television and theater for urban audiences." It has produced and continuous to produce Anthony's works and has also produced Secrets of a Black Boy, a play written by her brother Darren.

== Selected works ==
- 'Da Kink in my Hair
- I Am Not a Dinner Mint, The Crap Women Swallow to Stay in a Relationship!
- How Black Mothers Say I Love You
- Black Girl in Love (with Herself)
- Brampton Walk of fame

== Awards ==
- Eve Ensler Vagina Warrior Award 2005
- NAACP Theatre Award 2007
- Gemini Award 2008
- Harry Jerome Award 2009
- Egale Canada – Queering Black History Award 2009
