= The Dominion (Canada) =

Canadian newspaper

- Type: Monthly
- Format: Newspaper
- Editor: Dru Oja Jay
- Founded: April 2003
- Website: http://www.dominionpaper.ca

The Dominion is a monthly newspaper and web site in Canada.

The Dominion is published by the Dominion Newspaper Society, a non-profit organization. Formed by a group of independent journalists in April 2003, The Dominion publishes a print edition and distributes a pdf version of the newspaper online.

Dru Oja Jay is founding editor of the Dominion, and Hillary Lindsay is the paper's managing editor.

Previous contributors include Jon Elmer, Anthony Fenton, Yuill Herbert, Erin Steuter, Jen Pierce, Matthew Trafford, Rob Maguire, and Stewart Steinhauer.

The staff is based in cities across Canada, with concentrations in Halifax, Montreal and Vancouver. A local edition of the newspaper was published for several months as a street newspaper in Ottawa by the Ottawa Panhandlers' Union, but went on hiatus due to police harassment of homeless vendors of the newspaper and lack of funds.

The newspaper bills itself as providing "accurate, critical coverage that is accountable to its readers and the subjects it tackles" and examining "politics, culture and daily life with a view to understanding the exercise of power". In 2006, The Dominion editorial collective launched The Media Co-op as a national coast-to-coast network of local online media co-operatives.

In 2021, some members of the editorial collective launched an online news website called The Breach.

== See also ==
- National Observer (Canada)
