= Anthony Fenton =

Anthony Fenton is a Canadian independent print and radio journalist and writer. He has been a regular contributor to The Dominion and Z Communications, and is currently a doctoral student at York University.

== Education ==
Fenton earned a BA in political science from the University of Alberta in 2002 and an MA in political economy from York University in 2011. His master's thesis primarily took a wide-angled look at Canadian lawyers and law firms, aiming to investigate the functions they perform for Canadian government and business elites, as well as for the capitalist system globally. He is currently undertaking doctoral research at York.

== Work ==
Fenton maintains a long-running interest in Haiti. At the end of 2005, he and Dennis Bernstein exposed the links of journalist Régine Alexandre, who at the time was working freelance for the Associated Press and The New York Times, to the US National Endowment for Democracy. The AP consequently severed its ties with Alexandre. Fenton's first book, Canada in Haiti: Waging War on the Poor Majority (2005), which he co-wrote with Yves Engler, was a study of Canadian policy towards the Caribbean nation.

He has also written on the principle of Responsibility to Protect, which he argues is "a new name for the old concept of humanitarian intervention, or humanitarian imperialism."

== Bibliography ==
- Canada in Haiti: Waging War on the Poor Majority. Co-author Yves Engler. Co-published: RED Publishing, Fernwood Publishing. 2005. ISBN 978-1-552-66168-0.
- Mapping the Ruling Class: Situating Canada's Transnational Corporate Lawyers/Law Firms (MA). Toronto: York University. 2011.
- "Building an Expeditionary Force for Democracy Promotion" (with Jon Elmer), in Jerome Klassen and Greg Albo, eds., Empire's Ally: Canada and the War in Afghanistan, pp. 306–338. Toronto: University of Toronto Press. 2013. ISBN 978-1-442-64515-8
