= Charles Officer =

Canadian writer, filmmaker, and ice hockey player (1975–2023)

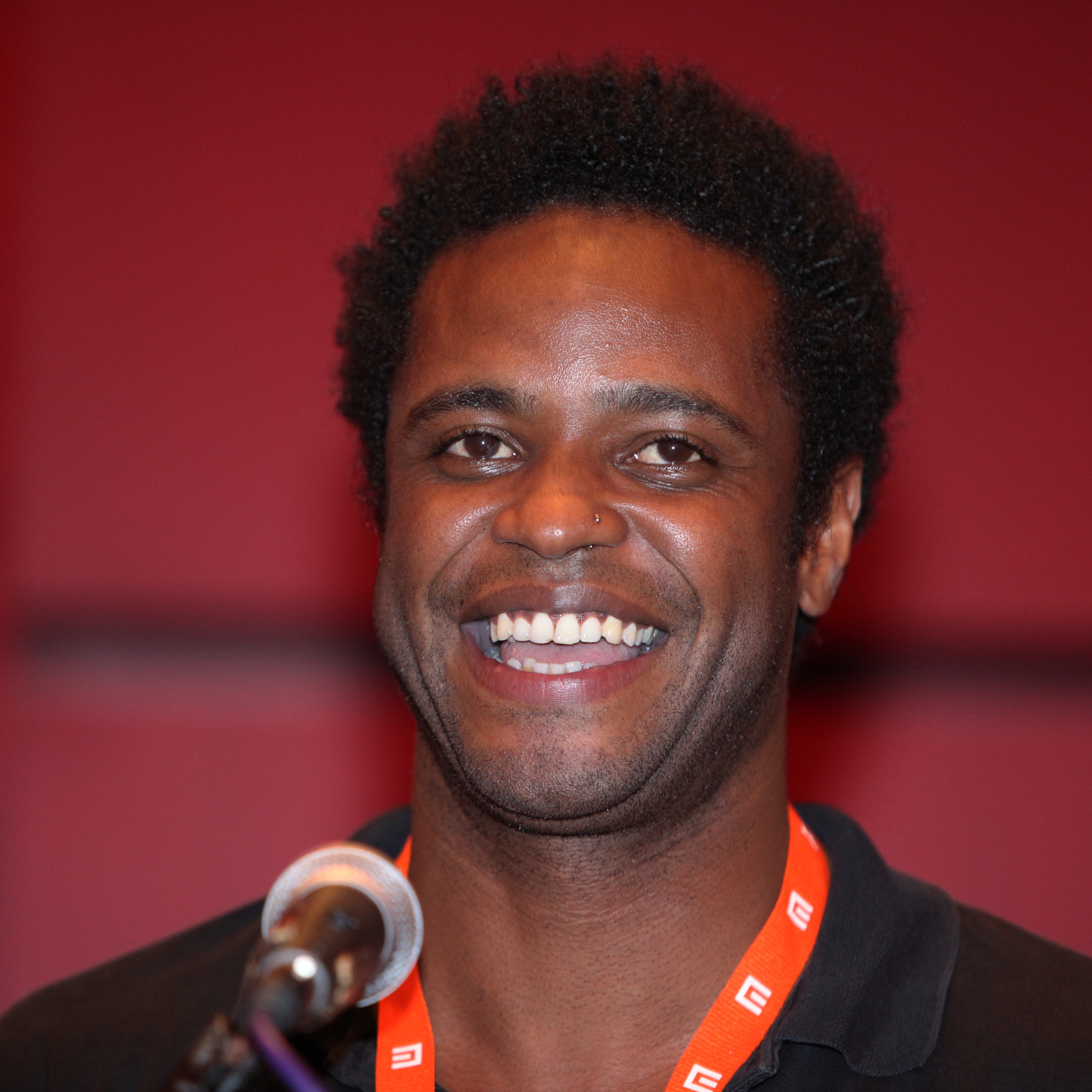
- Officer at the 44th KVIFF
- Born: October 28, 1975; Toronto, Ontario, Canada
- Died: December 1, 2023 (aged 48); Toronto, Ontario, Canada
- Occupations: Film director; television director; screenwriter; actor; hockey player
- Known for: Nurse.Fighter.Boy; Akilla's Escape

Charles Officer (October 28, 1975 – December 1, 2023) was a Canadian film and television director, writer, actor, and professional hockey player.

== Early life and education ==
Charles Officer was born in Toronto, Ontario on October 28, 1972. He was born to a Black British father and a Jamaican-Jewish Canadian mother, as the youngest of four children.

Officer abandoned professional hockey due to injury problems and pursued a communication design degree at Ontario College of Art and Design (OCAD), before attending the Neighborhood Playhouse in New York City to study performance.

== Career ==
=== Ice hockey ===
Throughout his teenage years, Officer played competitive hockey. He was drafted by the Sudbury Wolves of the Ontario Hockey League. He played professional ice hockey in the U.K for a year before being drafted for the NHL's Calgary Flames.

=== Acting ===
After a wrist injury cut his professional hockey career short, Officer pursued training in the performing arts, relocating to New York City to study acting at the Neighborhood Playhouse School of the Theatre. Upon returning to Toronto, he made his professional on-screen debut with a guest appearance on the television series Power Play, a role that leveraged his background as an athlete. He subsequently secured small roles in several domestic feature film productions, including Clement Virgo's drama Love Come Down (2000), Helen Lee's romantic comedy The Art of Woo (2001), and Bruce McDonald's thriller Picture Claire (2001). In 2002, he portrayed Keith Lawson in the slasher sequel American Psycho 2.

From 2002 to 2005, Officer held his first major television role as a series regular on the CBC Television drama The Eleventh Hour (broadcast in some markets under the syndication title Bury the Lead), playing the character Russell Tyler. During this period, he also began a frequent creative partnership with independent filmmaker Ingrid Veninger, co-starring as Charles Fielder alongside her in the 2004 drama The Limb Salesman, directed by Anais Granofsky. In 2005, he appeared as Xavier in the television film Riding the Bus with My Sister, which was directed by Anjelica Huston. He followed this with a role as Frances "Church" Churchill in the 2006 independent film Your Beautiful Cul de Sac Home.

Alongside his feature-length and television roles, Officer appeared in several short films throughout his career. He starred in Urda/Bone (2003)—a short he also co-directed with Veninger—as well as Trouser Accidents (2004), Furstenau Mysteries (2011), Overwatch (2012), and Black Tea in Bardo (2015). He also made a minor appearance as a bowling alley drug dealer in the 2015 biographical drama Born to Be Blue.

Officer's acting career also extended to the stage. In September 2008, he performed in a co-production of Lorraine Hansberry's classic play A Raisin in the Sun, organized by Theatre Calgary and the Soulpepper Theatre Company. Directed by Weyni Mengesha, the production and its ensemble cast were praised by critics for delivering highly nuanced performances.

=== Directing ===
Officer is the founder and creative director of the production company Canesugar Filmworks alongside his business partner Jake Yanowski. He was a cofounder of the Black Screen Office in Canada, which was established in 2020 to help address systemic racism in Canada's film industry and improve representation of Black communities on screen.

Officer's directorial debut, When Morning Comes, premiered at the 2000 Toronto International Film Festival (TIFF). His other work included the short films Short Hymn, Silent War (2002), Pop Song and Urda/Bone (2003), a music video for K'naan's "Strugglin'" (2005) and television pilot Hotel Babylon (2005).

Officer was a frequent collaborator of Canadian filmmaker and actress Ingrid Veninger, having worked on numerous projects with her, including in Urda/Bone, which screened at the New York Film Festival in 2003. The short film was later picked up for distribution by Mongrel Media. Veninger also produced his feature film Nurse.Fighter.Boy.

The 57th Berlin International Film Festival selected his feature screenplay Nurse.Fighter.Boy for its Sparkling Tales writer's lab in 2007. Inspired by Officer's sister's battle with sickle cell anemia, the film was produced while Officer was a student at the Canadian Film Centre. The film was shot over 23 days with a hand-held camera on location in Toronto, in areas where Officer grew up, including the back alleyways of Eastern Avenue; Woodbine and Danforth Avenue; and a boxing club in Cabbagetown where Officer had learned to fight at age 13.

Nurse.Fighter.Boy premiered at TIFF 2008 and won the Audience Award at the International Filmfestival Mannheim-Heidelberg, plus the audience award for Best in World Cinema and a jury prize for Best Cinematography at the Sarasota Film Festival. It was also released theatrically in Canada in February 2009.

In April 2009, production began on Officer's feature documentary about Harry Jerome. The film was completed in 2010.

In 2009, Officer directed two short films for the cross-platform project City Sonic. Officer, along with six other directors, shot 20 short films about Toronto musicians and the places where their musical lives were transformed. Officer directed films starring D-Sisive and Divine Brown.

Premiering at the Vancouver International Film Festival on October 8, 2010, Mighty Jerome explores the rise, fall and redemption of Harry Jerome, Canada's most record-setting track and field star. Archival footage, interviews and recreations are used to tell the story of what Jerome's university coach, Bill Bowerman, called "The greatest comeback in track and field history." Mighty Jerome is produced by the NFB's Selwyn Jacob.

In June 2015, Officer completed principal photography in Toronto on a National Film Board of Canada documentary entitled Unarmed Verses, produced by Lea Marin, which explores youth and race-related issues in the city of Toronto in the aftermath of the killing of Trayvon Martin in the United States through the experiences of Francine, a 12-year-old girl living with her father and grandmother in a northeast Toronto neighbourhood facing demolition and reconstruction. The film was named Best Canadian Feature at the 2017 Hot Docs Canadian International Documentary Festival. In October 2017, it was named Best Canadian Documentary at the Vancouver International Film Festival.

The Skin We're In, Officer's documentary about Canadian journalist Desmond Cole, premiered on CBC Television in March 2017.

In 2018, Officer released the documentary film Invisible Essence: The Little Prince. His next narrative feature film, Akilla's Escape, followed in 2020. Officer and cowriter Wendy Motion Brathwaite won the Canadian Screen Award for Best Original Screenplay at the 9th Canadian Screen Awards in 2021.

In 2022, he won the Canadian Screen Award for Best Direction in a Web Program or Series at the 10th Canadian Screen Awards for "The Death News", an episode of the anthology series 21 Black Futures. The same year, Officer directed the CBC/BET television series The Porter The show won 12 Canadian Screen Awards (CSA). The show is based on true historical events and presents stories of Black Canadian railway porters following the first World War.

== Death ==
Officer died in Toronto on December 1, 2023, at the age of 48 due to a lengthy illness.

== Posthumous credits and awards ==
Following his death, he was posthumously named as the winner of the Toronto Film Critics Association's Company 3 TFCA Luminary Award, and the Toronto International Film Festival partnered with the Canadian Broadcasting Corporation to create a new award in Officer's memory, to be presented annually as part of the Canada's Top Ten announcements to a filmmaker for their body of work. Representatives of his estate selected Thyrone Tommy as the recipient of the TFCA's "pay it forward" grant.

In 2022, he was announced as directing a contemporary remake of the 1986 film Youngblood. Although he completed the screenplay with cowriters Kyle Rideout, Josh Epstein and Seneca Aaron, the film had not yet entered photography by the time of Officer's death; it was directed by Hubert Davis, and Youngblood premiered at the 2025 Toronto International Film Festival. In a scene that takes place in Coach Murray Chadwick's office, a framed jersey can be seen on the wall with the name Officer stitched on the back. The film was also dedicated to him.

== Filmography ==
=== Film ===
- Short Hymn, Silent War (2002)
- Nurse.Fighter.Boy (2008)
- Mighty Jerome (2010)
- Unarmed Verses (2017)
- Invisible Essence: The Little Prince (2018)
- Akilla's Escape (2020)
- Youngblood (2025, screenplay only)

=== Television ===
- The Skin We're In (2017)
- Coroner (2020)
- The Porter (2022)
