= Toronto Community Housing =

Public housing agency

Toronto Community Housing Corporation

Agency overview
- Formed: January 1, 2002
- Preceding agency: Toronto Community Housing
- Type: Municipally owned corporation
- Headquarters: 931 Yonge Street Toronto, Ontario, M4W 2H2
- Employees: 1,600
- Annual budget: 672.1 million CAD (2022)
- Agency executives: Sean Baird, President and CEO; Tim Murphy, Board Chair
- Parent organization: City of Toronto
- Website: www.torontohousing.ca

Toronto Community Housing Corporation (TCHC) is a public housing agency in Toronto, Ontario. It is the largest social housing provider in Canada with over 58,000 units across 2,100 buildings and approximately 105,000 residents. It is the second-largest housing provider in North America, behind the New York City Housing Authority.

TCHC is a municipal corporation of the City of Toronto, representing a $10 billion public asset. It operates as a non-profit with most of its operating funding coming from the residents' rental payments and subsidies from the City of Toronto. The remainder of funding comes from renting commercial spaces, parking, laundry, cable, and income from other investments.

The City of Toronto is the sole shareholder of TCHC and appoints a board of directors to manage and monitor the TCHC performance. The Board includes two city councillors, a mayor or mayoral representative, three tenant directors and seven citizen members.

TCHC is a 2022 Greater Toronto's Top Employers winner. TCHC was also named one of Canada's Top 100 Employers by Mediacorp Canada's Inc in 2009 and 2011.

== History ==
In 1998, the Municipality of Metropolitan Toronto, which included six constituent municipalities of East York, Etobicoke, North York, Scarborough, York, and the original city of Toronto, were amalgamated to create the City of Toronto under one government.

TCHC was created by the City of Toronto on January 1, 2002 with the Metropolitan Toronto Housing Corporation (MTHC) and the Toronto Housing Company. The MTHC was formerly the Metro Toronto Housing Authority, which managed provincial public housing units in the city. Toronto Housing Company was a product of a 1999 merger between the Metropolitan Toronto Housing Company Ltd. and the City of Toronto Non-Profit Housing Corporation (also known as Cityhome). Cityhome was established in 1974 to provide affordable rental accommodation for low-income families.

TCHC took charge of administering all public housing units within Toronto as the newly amalgamated city created an official plan around revitalizing priority neighbourhoods.

Since 2006, TCHC has been engaged in an extensive period of community revitalization work across their portfolio. Projects have been launched in a number of communities, including:

- 42 Hubbard Blvd
- 250 Davenport
- Alexandra Park
- Allenbury Gardens
- Don Summerville
- Firgrove-Grassways
- Lawrence Heights
- Leslie Nymark
- Railway Lands
- Regent Park
- Rivertowne
- The West Don Lands

A significant project is the revitalization of Regent Park. Demolition work began in February 2006 and was followed by the completion of the neighbourhood's first building in 2008. The five-phase project was developed by two companies. The Daniels Corporation was responsible for completing Phases 1, 2 and 3, while the remaining Phases 4 and 5 are to be completed by Tridel. As of 2022, work continues on Phases 4 and 5.

In 2019, TCHC launched its 10-year $2.6 billion capital repair plan to revitalize the majority of its buildings, most of which are over 50 years old. This plan was funded through the federal government's National Housing Co-Investment fund, which contributed $1.3 billion in partnership with the City of Toronto. It was the largest federal housing investment with a municipal partner in Canadian history.

== Tenancy ==
=== Rent ===
TCHC offers three types of rent: rent-geared-to-income, affordable rent, and market rent.

Rent-geared-to-income is for subsidized housing. It is 30 per cent of gross monthly household income before deductions, plus utilities and other service changes.

=== Accessibility ===
TCHC's Accessibility Program gives tenants with disabilities an opportunity to work with staff and other residents to make accessibility improvements to their units and common areas. The program supports Toronto Community Housing's Human Rights, Harassment and Fair Access Policy, the Ontario Human Rights Code, and the City of Toronto's Multi-Year Accessibility Plan.

TCHC's Accessible Customer Service policy follows the Accessibility for Ontarians with Disabilities Act (AODA):

- Customer service will be provided in a way that respects the dignity and independence of persons with disabilities
- Customers with disabilities will fully benefit from the same services, in the same place, and in the same or similar way, as all other customers, unless an alternate measure is necessary.
- Customers with disabilities will be provided the same opportunity to access services as all other customers

=== Rights and responsibilities ===
As landlords, the TCHC has a responsibility to:

- Provide services as set out in the lease, under the law, or both
- Keep rental property well-maintained and respond to repair requests within five days
- Comply with local health, safety, and property standards and bylaws
- Provide proof of payment when requested
- Process annual rent reviews for tenants in rent-geared-to-income leases
- Provide 24 hours' notice before entering a unit unless there is an emergency; in which case, staff can enter the unit (flood, fire, life-threatening event or life-safety check)
- Provide accessible customer service to residents with disabilities

As landlords, the TCHC has a right to collect one month's rent deposit for tenants in market pay leases. TCHC deposit terms:

- uses the deposit as the rent payment for the last month of the tenancy
- cannot use the deposit for any other reason, such as paying for damages
- pays interest on the deposit each year

== Capital initiatives ==
TCHC developed a plan to fix its buildings through its Revitalization program. The Revitalization plan leverages the value of the property in many of its communities to offset the cost of replacing and renewing homes. TCHC's private sector development partners are addressing 10 to 12 per cent of its community Revitalization portfolio. TCHC and the City of Toronto developed the 10-Year Capital Financing Plan to address the remaining 90 per cent of portfolio repairs. It has a $2.6 billion investment between the federal, provincial, and municipal government.

TCHC retained the Canadian Centre for Economic Analysis to analyze the full value of the portfolio, municipal, provincial, and federal investments.

The key findings of the report found that with full investment in the capital repair plan:

- TCHC will have 76 per cent of its homes in good or fair condition and 24 per cent in poor or critical condition in ten years
- TCHC can offer eight times as many housing units in good or fair condition to current and prospective residents, preventing over 544,000 instances of resident illnesses and reducing healthcare system use by 2.1 million visits
- TCHC will see about 10% less of utility costs per unit
- TCHC's neighbourhood wealth could increase by $13.6 billion

=== Building for sustainability ===
TCHC is looking for and implementing innovative solutions to improve, renew, and maintain its housing supply. Many of TCHC's buildings have implemented best practices through Leadership in Energy and Environmental Design (LEED) for New Construction system, an internationally recognized rating system for sustainable building best practices. LEED credits are organized in seven main green building categories.

TCHC buildings have accomplished the following LEED credits:

- Sustainable sites recognize steps TCHC has taken to reduce the impact of their site and how residents and visitors travel to and from the building every day.
- Water efficiency focuses on strategies to reduce water use – specifically, drinking water.
- Energy and atmosphere includes strategies for reducing energy use and greenhouse gas emissions.
- Materials and resources is about selecting materials to reduce the environmental impact of constructing TCHC buildings, as well as dealing with waste appropriately.
- Indoor environmental quality recognizes that in order for a building to be great, it needs to be great for the environment and the people living in it. This means paying close attention to the air quality and the daylight levels within the space.
- Innovation in design rewards projects for going above and beyond the standard LEED credits and implementing something different.
- Regional priority rewards projects with extra credits for pursuing specific LEED credits based on the province they are located in and whether they are in an urban or rural setting.

=== Relocation and return ===
TCHC is committed to the revitalization of its buildings. During this process, some residents need to relocate while buildings are being repaired.

TCHC provides residents with significant notice and intensive education about the revitalization and relocation process before any relocation process is underway. In some cases, residents can move directly from their old unit and into a new unit being built as part of the revitalization process. In other cases, residents may need to move to a relocation unit in the same community or another TCHC building.

Every resident who is relocated as part of a Revitalization has the right to return to a new unit being built as part of the revitalization process, subject to Relocation Agreement eligibility rules.

=== Affordable home ownership ===
The Foundation Program provides eligible Toronto Community Housing tenants living in Regent Park, Lawrence Heights, Alexandra Park or Allenbury Gardens with down payment assistance for up to 35 per cent of the price of a new home in their revitalization community.

The BOOST program helps eligible home purchasers with their down payment by providing assistance for up to 10 per cent of the price of a new home in a TCHC revitalization community.

== Community Safety Unit ==
TCHC maintains a special constabulary for the purposes of providing policing and law enforcement services at and in relation to TCHC properties. The unit conducts proactive patrols, responds to calls for service, and investigates some crimes at TCHC properties.

The special constables have authority under the Criminal Code of Canada, Controlled Drugs and Substances Act, Mental Health Act, Liquor Licence Act, Trespass to Property Act, and Provincial Offences Act. They carry batons, OC spray, and handcuffs.

== Controversies ==
=== 2010 Fire at 200 Wellesley Street East ===
On September 24, 2010, a fire broke out on the 24th floor of the 200 Wellesley Street East high-rise apartment building. The fire started in a unit belonging to a tenant that Toronto Public Health had recommended needed to be decluttered after a bedbug investigation in July. There are reports that the fire worsened because of newspapers, books, and other combustible materials in the unit when the fire began.

The building was home to 1,200 residents and had massive damage on the 23rd, 24th, and 25th floors.

=== 2011 Backlog of housing repairs ===
TCHC has compiled a list of buildings in need of repair since forming in 2002. In 2011, TCHC initiated a program of selling off units and other assets to delegate the proceeds to the backlog of building repairs. In 2012, the Ontario government approved the sale of 65 properties. Toronto City Council approved the sale of 55 properties in October 2012. By 2013, TCHC still estimated $751 million in repairs needed for its buildings.

=== 2011 Audit report controversy ===
Toronto Auditor General Jeffery Griffiths conducted audits of TCHC procurements and employee expenses between January 1, 2009 and June 30, 2010. He reported his findings in two reports on December 7, 2010. One revealed inappropriate expenses from TCHC staff abusing the organization's funds for personal interest. Some examples include:

- $53,500 for staff party in December 2008
- $40,000 for a staff Christmas party at local banquet hall in December 2009
- $6,000 for a planning session in Muskoka
- $5,000 for restaurant and entertainment
- $3,000 for a planning session at resort in Alliston
- $1,925 for a planning meeting at local spa
- $1,850 boat cruise for "staff training development"
- $1,000 in staff gifts from Holt Renfrew
- $1,004 in gift cards recognizing staff achievements
- $800 for massages at a staff summer picnic

The procurement audit found that the TCHC board of directors' procurement policy and procedures were sometimes ignored. Examples include:

- Tendering process (or invitation to tender) was not always transparent
- Open tendering process was not used at times when it should have been
- Purchase orders were sometimes split to circumvent procurement procedures
- Tendering processes that were deemed inappropriate

One tendering process case included a potential conflict of interest of nearly $25 million in work awarded to an unsolicited proposal without competition from other vendors. The report also criticized TCHC for bypassing the formal requirement that bidders make deposits, which is a requirement that protects the TCHC, should a bidder fail to meet its contractual obligations. The report criticized TCHC because its documentation inadequately supported some cases of single tendering.

Toronto Mayor Rob Ford demanded that the TCHC board of directors resign. Though initially resistant, all board members resigned by March 3, 2011. The board was replaced on a temporary basis by former city councillor Case Ootes.

Ford also demanded that TCHC CEO Keiko Nakamura resign. Although she initially refused to step down, she was fired by Managing Director Ootes, officially losing her position on March 25, 2011. Nakamura had replaced Derek Ballantyne, the CEO of TCHC from 2002 to 2009, whose time in leadership overlapped with the inappropriate expenses from the audit report. As COO of Toronto land development agency Build Toronto, Ballantyne was asked to step down from his position. Although initially reluctant, he stepped down on March 4, 2011.

Eugene Jones took over as president and CEO of TCHC on June 18, 2012.

=== 2013 eviction scandals ===
In 2013, Ombudsman Toronto released a report about TCHC's eviction policy and its evictions. The report was sparked by the death of a senior one month after being evicted from a TCHC building in 2011. One of the responses by TCHC CEO Len Koroneos was, "Good eviction prevention programs cannot be implemented at the expense of rent collection".

The TCHC Board adopted Ombudsman Toronto's recommendations from their progress update. Some of these recommendations range from staff training to performance management so the TCHC can implement equitable practices for senior tenants. One of the Ombudsman recommendations was to implement recommendations from the Honourable Justice Patrick Lesage who the board of directors appointed to conduct an independent review of the eviction. Some of Justice Lesage's recommendations included making direct contact between TCHC staff and tenants more consistent and creating the Commissioner of Housing Equity, a new independent office to oversee and ensure TCHC staff engages in required eviction prevention procedures.

=== 2013 fraudulent billing ===
Five TCHC employees were fired after an investigation into fraudulent billing found evidence of wrongdoing. The investigation involved a former subsidiary, Housing Services Inc., in connection with an insurance claim for the 200 Wellesley Street East building fire.

The file was turned over to Toronto Police for further investigation.

=== 2022 Swansea Mews incident ===
On May 27, 2022, a ceiling panel in the bedroom of a TCHC unit collapsed, sending a tenant to the hospital with injuries. The townhouse unit was in Swansea Mews, a complex near the Queensway, housing around 420 people. Inspection by third-party engineers determined that the cause of the incident was related to a construction default that dated back to the building's creation. As a result, all tenants from this complex were moved into temporary accommodation. TCHC covered the cost for temporary accommodations, food, and transportation. The next steps are being determined for the Swansea Mews community's temporary relocation.
