= Invisible City (film) =

2009 Canadian documentary film

- Directed by: Hubert Davis
- Written by: Sondra Kelly; Hubert Davis; Mehernaz Lentin
- Produced by: Mehernaz Lentin; Gerry Flahive; Hubert Davis
- Cinematography: Chris Romeike
- Edited by: Hubert Davis
- Music by: Fraser MacDougall; Michael White
- Distributed by: National Film Board of Canada
- Release date: May 2, 2009 (HotDocs Film Festival)
- Running time: 76 minutes
- Country: Canada
- Language: English

Invisible City is a 2009 documentary film by Hubert Davis about young Black Canadian men at risk in Toronto's Regent Park district. Davis spent three years filming two boys in their final years of high school.

The primary subjects of the film are Kendell and Mikey, students at Nelson Mandela Park Public School. Invisible City follows their struggles with academic and behavioral issues, and their sense of futility.

Invisible City is produced by Industry Pictures/Shine Films in co-production with the National Film Board of Canada.

== Reception ==
Invisible City received the Best Canadian Feature Documentary award at the 2009 Hot Docs Canadian International Documentary Festival. In announcing its decision, the Hot Docs festival jury stated:

The Award goes to a film that weds form and content with extraordinary grace and intelligence. It is no small feat to maintain a focus on the raw material of real human experience while honouring the documentary as a cinematic art form. Because it does all these things, and because it maintains the dignity of its subjects’ lives while asking difficult questions about the conditions under which those lives are lived, the jury has chosen Hubert Davis’s Invisible City as the best Canadian feature.

The film opened theatrically at the Royal Theatre in Toronto in February 2010, before premiering on TVOntario.
