= Da Kink in My Hair (TV series) =

- Created by: Trey Anthony; Ngozi Paul
- Starring: Ordena Stephens-Thompson; Trey Anthony; Ngozi Paul; Richard Fagon (2007-08); Conroy Stewart (2007-08); Daniel J. Gordon (2009); Eli Goree (2009)
- Country of origin: Canada
- No. of seasons: 2
- No. of episodes: 26

Production
- Running time: 30 minutes (21 min. 30 sec.)
- Production companies: Defiant; Ngozika Productions; Trey Anthony Productions; Barna-Alper Productions; Canwest

Original release
- Network: Global
- Release: October 14, 2007 – May 14, 2009

Da Kink in My Hair is a Canadian television sitcom. Based on the play of the same name by Trey Anthony, the story was adapted into a television show and aired on Global during prime time. It was the first comedy series on a national private mainstream broadcaster that was created by and starring Black women in Canada. The series had centred on a hair salon in the heart of Toronto's Caribbean-Canadian community, Eglinton West. The series debuted on Global on October 14, 2007, and the final episode aired on May 14, 2009. It was the winner of the Canadian Association of Broadcasters Best Fiction Series prize in 2008 and won a Gemini Award for Best Hair. The series has been rebroadcast on Television Jamaica.

== Cast ==
The show stars Ordena Stephens-Thompson as Novelette "Letty" Campbell, the Caribbean-Canadian owner of a hair salon in Toronto. Trey Anthony, the writer of the original play on which the series was based, also stars as Letty's sister Joy.

The original cast also included Ngozi Paul, Richard Fagon, and Conroy Stewart. In season 2, the role of Dre was recast and Daniel J. Gordon assumed the role created by Stewart.

== Characters ==
=== Main characters ===
- Ordena Stephens-Thompson as Novelette "Letty" Campbell. Letty is the Jamaican-Canadian owner of the salon. Originally from Spanish Town, Jamaica, she is the mother of Dre (Conray Stewart/Daniel J. Gordon) and the sister of Joy (Trey Anthony) and has a brother Winston who lives in Kingston. Letty has been living in Canada for seven years prior to the beginning of the series and opened up "Letty's Hair Salon" not long after. She is very proud of her business and enjoys working as well trying to make people happy. Letty is dedicated to her business and knows how important the shop is to its clients, most of whom are recent women immigrants from The Caribbean. Letty recently sent for her sister Joy and son Dre, whom Joy raised while Letty was in Canada. Letty, however, is unimpressed by the way Joy raised him and wants to raise him by her rules. Despite this, the two both co-raise the young boy. A running gag throughout the first season is that Letty hasn't been on a date in over seven years.
- Trey Anthony as Joy Campbell. Joy is Letty's younger sister and the shop receptionist. Originally from Spanish Town, Jamaica, Joy recently arrived in Toronto after Letty sent her for her and Letty's teenage son Dre, who Joy raised while Letty was trying to send for them to join her in Canada. Joy is known for her very colourful weaves, her vibrant fun-loving personality, as well as her outspoken attitude. A running gag throughout the series is that Joy would rather be back home in Jamaica than in Canada, where she doesn't like the laws and rules. Joy is also a hopeless romantic who is openly disapproving when black men date interracially. In the first season, Joy dated Gary, a successful Jamaican-Canadian real estate agent, whom she broke up with later in the season due to his abusive behaviour and demanding attitude.
- Ngozi Paul as Allison "Starr" McMasterson. Starr is an African-Canadian trainee at the salon. Adopted by a white family, she was raised in an all-white environment in Peterborough, Ontario so to discover herself as a black woman she moved to Toronto after quitting law school and began working at the salon. During the first season, Starr was ashamed of her adoptive family but later grew to accept them. Although Starr stated she "does not date black men", she had a brief crush and flirtation with her coworker Nigel before he got back with his ex. A running gag throughout the series is that Starr knows nothing of West Indian culture.
- Richard Fagon as Nigel. A first-generation Jamaican Canadian, Nigel is a stylist at the salon who is known for his womanizing ways. Whenever an ex entered the shop Nigel would ask Letty for a break. He also had a brief flirtationship with Starr before he began dating Nikki. Although he only appeared in the first season, Nigel was a major character who would jokingly make fun of Starr, about her being "whitewashed" and knowing little of West Indian culture. The character of Nigel did not return in the second season.

== Episodes ==
=== Season 1 (2007–08) ===
No.	Title	Original release date	Prod. code
1	"Rules Are Made..."	October 14, 2007	1-01
Novelette and Joy are at odds on how to discipline Dre.
2	"Fass and Facety"	October 21, 2007	1-02
Joy and Starr clash over hair and clothes.
3	"Chicken"	November 4, 2007	1-03
Starr is given a chance to attend a Caribana boat cruise party with a singer.
4	"Empty Bag Can't Stand Up"	November 11, 2007	1-04
Novelette has trouble balancing her responsibilities as a mother with the demands of the salon.
5	"Love Can't Wrap Up in a Paper"	November 18, 2007	1-05
Joy goes into business with Nigel selling hair cream with hopes that he's interested in more than just making money with her.
6	"Every Hoe Have Him Stick"	November 25, 2007	1-06
Nigel falls for Nikki who causes quite an uproar in the salon.
7	"The Man of the House"	December 2, 2007	1-07
Dwayne offers to help; Nigel turns to Starr for advice when he finds out his friend is not the father of his child.
8	"Mouth Open, Story Jump Out"	December 9, 2007	1-08
Starr's secret is revealed; Joy lies to Gary.
9	"All That Glitters"	December 16, 2007	1-09
Joy's relationship with Gary heats up; Novelette is up to her ears in staff demands.
10	"Mother of a Day"	January 6, 2008	1-10
For Letty's birthday, Joy arranges for their mother to travel from Jamaica for a visit. A client of the salon gives up custody of her children when she begins to feel herself losing control.
11	"Me Throw Me Corn But Me No Call No Fowl"	January 13, 2008	1-11
Joy and Gary are on a date; Novelette offers Joy an apprenticeship at the salon; Starr refuses to talk to Nigel.
12	"Speakey-Spokey"	January 20, 2008	1-12
Starr is sent into an emotional tailspin; Novelette deals with mixed emotions.
13	"Di Heart of Di Matter"	January 27, 2008	1-13
Richard has re-entered Letty's life.

=== Season 2 (2009) ===
No.	Title	Original release date	Prod. code
14	"Everything In Its Right Place"	February 12, 2009	2-01
Letty struggles being a mother and working her shop at once. Joy tries to acclimate to the climate.
15	"Looks Can Be Revealing"	February 19, 2009	2-02
Letty's mentor Pops comes in the hopes to get his grandson Malik a job, but Letty and Joy don't trust him. Starr looks for a present to get on her mother's birthday.
16	"Of Papers and Patois"	February 26, 2009	2-03
Novelette's undergoes renovations; Joy studies for her official exam.
17	"Playing Social"	March 5, 2009	2-04
Joy enlists Starr's help to make her more Canadian; Starr is appalled that Letty is using chemicals on a child.
18	"Forced Ripe Mango"	March 12, 2009	2-05
Letty has second thoughts about her relationship with Richard.
19	"Licks!"	March 19, 2009	2-06
Dre's model student reputation is jeopardized when he gets into trouble with the law.
20	"Honesty The Best Policy?"	March 26, 2009	2-07
Letty gets an unexpected visitor; Joy uses the power of positive thinking.
21	"Empress of Eglinton"	April 2, 2009	2-08
Joy learns the hard way to be careful what you wish for; Starr takes on Fitzroy in a battle for good customer service.
22	"Computer Love"	April 16, 2009	2-09
Starr introduces a computer to the shop to help with scheduling appointments but the ladies use it for internet dating.
23	"Black Cake, White Cake"	April 23, 2009	2-10
Letty and Starr's mother co-host a birthday party for Starr; Joy is convinced that she's pregnant.
24	"Coming Out of the Closet"	April 30, 2009	2-11
Dre longs to date his overprotective landlord's daughter and enlists Joy and Letty's help in the matter.
25	"Pardnah Me?"	May 7, 2009	2-12
Starr and Julian's relationship hits a roadblock when he makes a homophobic remark.
26	"Oil's Well That Ends Well"	May 14, 2009	2-13
Letty tries to raise money to save her salon; Karen (guest star Vivica A. Fox) returns to the area in search of her daughter.

== Ratings ==
The show was a hit in its Sunday night 7:30pm time slot achieving solid 2's and 3's in the first two episodes. Due to a scheduling mishap and a lack of communication with the audience, after being preempted for two weeks it returned with 1.5's and rose steadily to complete the season.

Global announced on March 20, 2008, that the show would be renewed for a second season. The second season premiered on Global on February 12, 2009, and was scheduled to start in the middle of Grey's Anatomy. It proved to be the death knell for the show because they shared the same audience.
