= Assault of Dafonte Miller =

2016 assault in Whitby, Ontario, Canada

- Date: December 28, 2016
- Time: 2:30–3:30 a.m.
- Location: Whitby, Ontario, Canada
- Participants: Dafonte Miller, Christian Theriault, Michael Theriault
- Outcome: Charges dropped against Dafonte Miller; Christian Theriault found not guilty; Michael Theriault convicted of assault
- Injuries: Dafonte Miller blinded in one eye
- Sentence: Nine months in prison, 12 months' probation, and five-year weapons prohibition for Michael Theriault

Dafonte Miller is a 19 year old man who was assaulted on December 28, 2016 in Whitby, Ontario, Canada, a city located approximately 20 km (12 mi) from Toronto, by Michael Theriault, an off-duty constable of the Toronto Police Service. Michael's brother Christian participated in the assault. Miller is black; the Theriaults are white. On June 26, 2020, Michael Theriault was convicted of assault in connection with the incident. On November 5, 2020, Theriault was sentenced to nine months in prison with 12 months probation following, along with a five-year weapons prohibition. The case received significant media attention in Canada.

== Criminal charges and trial ==
Miller alleged that the assault was random, whereas the brothers alleged that Miller and one other person had broken into a truck near their home. Miller was initially charged with assault and theft in connection with the incident—charges which were later dropped. At trial, the court found that Miller and two friends were "essentially caught by Michael and Christian Theriault in the act of stealing items from the vehicle".

Michael Theriault assaulted Miller with a pipe, blinding him in one eye. On the recommendation of Miller's lawyer, Julian Falconer, an investigation by Ontario's Special Investigations Unit began four months after the assault. Following the investigation, the Theriaults were charged with aggravated assault and attempting to obstruct justice.

The trial began in October 2019 and lasted two weeks. Justice Joseph Di Luca of the Ontario Superior Court of Justice, sitting without a jury, conducted the trial in Oshawa. On June 26, 2020, Michael Theriault was found guilty of assault—a lesser included offense of aggravated assault—and not guilty of attempting to obstruct justice. Christian Theriault was found not guilty on all counts.

Due to the COVID-19 pandemic, in a rare event and for the first time for the Ontario Superior Court, the verdict was read live over YouTube. Over 20,000 people viewed the live broadcast in which Justice Di Luca delivered his verdict. Despite the live stream having been open and freely accessible online throughout the duration of the reading, the law still prohibited taking photos, screengrabs, or recordings of court proceedings. The media could not take pictures of or even rehost the YouTube stream.

On November 5, 2020, Judge Di Luca sentenced Michael Theriault to nine months in prison with 12 months probation afterwards, noting the "sentence is substantial but it is not crushing." The sentencing also includes a five-year weapons prohibition.

== Response ==
The case was highly publicized in Canada. An editorial by The Globe and Mail stated that it "underlines concerns about systemic deficiencies in policing." Jagmeet Singh, leader of the federal New Democratic Party, stated on Twitter that "[t]he violence perpetrated against Dafonte Miller is a painful example of police acting with impunity", and called for various reforms in response.

On August 6, 2020 Toronto Police Service's interim police chief James Ramer issued an apology to Miller stating the TPS "made the wrong decision" when it failed to notify the province's police watchdog, as is required when there is serious officer-involved injury or death. Chief Ramer, during a press conference, went on to say "[a]s a result of that decision, trust has been broken between the police, Dafonte Miller and the broader community. For that, on behalf of the Toronto Police Service, I want to apologize." In addition to the apology, Chief Ramer changed the policy for the Special Investigations Unit to investigate such incidents regardless of whether a TPS member is on- or off-duty. Miller did not accept the apology.

John Struthers, president of Ontario's Criminal Lawyers' Association, said that "after a thorough and methodical review of the evidence" the judge could not conclude this was "street justice", and "the really critical thing to remember is that we cannot expect any specific case to be guided by, influenced by or poisoned by the current political climate".
