= Desmond Cole =

Canadian journalist, activist, and writer (born 1982)

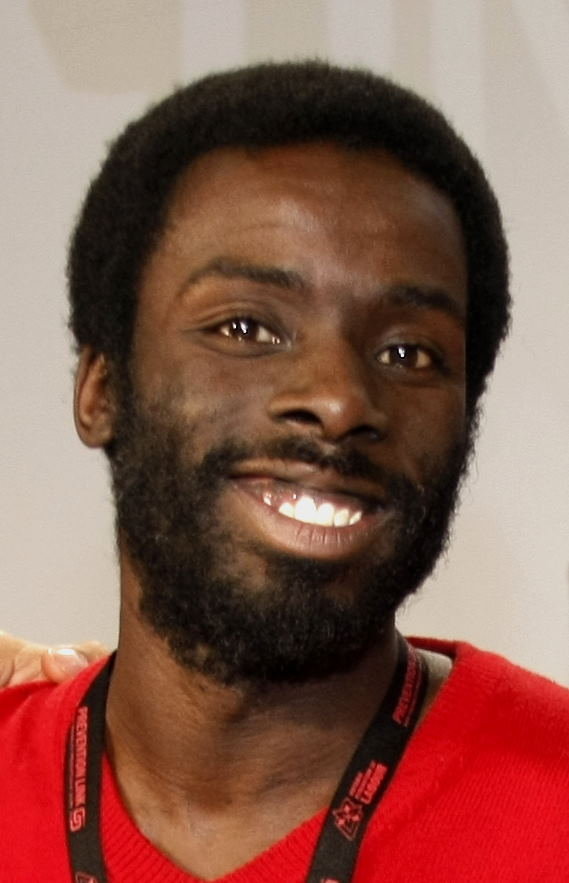
- Cole in 2017
- Born: April 9, 1982 (age 44); Red Deer, Alberta, Canada
- Occupations: Journalist; radio host; author; political commentator

Desmond Cole (born April 9, 1982) is a Canadian journalist, activist, author, and broadcaster who lives in Toronto, Ontario. He was previously a columnist for the Toronto Star and has written for The Walrus, NOW Magazine, Torontoist, The Tyee, Toronto Life, and BuzzFeed. Cole's activism has received national attention, specifically on the issues of police carding, racial discrimination, and dismantling systemic racism.

Cole was the subject of a 2017 CBC Television documentary, The Skin We're In and also hosted a radio show on Newstalk 1010 from 2015 to 2020. His first book, The Skin We're In: A Year of Black Resistance and Power, was released in January 2020 and became the bestselling Canadian book that year. He is a journalist and a contributor to The Breach.

== Early life ==
Cole was born in Red Deer, Alberta, grew up in Oshawa, Ontario, and went to secondary school in Whitby. He attended Queen's University for two years before dropping out, stating that "University is now job training, and I think that's nonsense." After teaching French in the Durham region for two years, he moved to Toronto at age 22, where he began working with at-risk youth. In the spring of 2006, Cole competed in Toronto's City Idol competition and was the winner for Toronto-East York. The winners of the competition were assisted in running for city council in the fall of 2006, and Cole placed third in Ward 20 Trinity-Spadina in the 2006 Toronto municipal election, at age 24.

== Career ==
=== "The Skin I'm In" and tenure as Toronto Star columnist (2015–2017) ===
Cole's 2015 essay for Toronto Life "The Skin I'm In", explored anti-Black racism in Toronto and across the province of Ontario. The piece chronicled how Cole was carded over fifty times by police in Toronto. The piece was the seventh most read article of the decade on Toronto Life and won three awards at the 2015 National Magazine Awards. The essay was subsequently the basis of a 2017 CBC Television documentary film, The Skin We're In, directed by Charles Officer. Cole also hosted a weekend talk show on CFRB radio from 2015 to 2020.

During his time as a columnist for the Toronto Star, beginning in September 2015, Cole rose to prominence covering issues of race in Toronto.

==== Resignation from column ====
In May 2017, Cole resigned from his bi-monthly column at the Toronto Star after being told by his editor he had violated the newspaper's rules on journalism and activism by protesting a Toronto Police Services Board meeting over the Toronto police practice of carding and racial profiling. Commentators pointed to contradictions in the Star's admonishment of Cole, and cited the Star's long history of employing and supporting columnists who engage in activism.

Michele Landsberg, a former Star columnist, called the Star's treatment of Cole a blunder. She wrote that Cole felt bound by his promise to black children he had addressed during a presentation during Black History Month. Landsberg contrasted the support the Star had provided for the feminist activism she advocated during her 25 years as a Star columnist, with its lack of support for Cole.

=== Activism (2018–2019) ===
On December 14, 2017, PEN Canada picked Cole for its Ken Filkow Prize, for freedom of expression. Towards the end of 2017, speculation arose that Cole was thinking about running for mayor of Toronto; however, Cole later announced that we would not enter the race.

On July 10, 2018, Cole criticized mayor of Toronto John Tory for referring to two black men who injured two children with gunfire as "sewer rats". Cole pointed out that he had not used animal terms to refer to Alek Minassian, who had recently perpetrated the Toronto Van Attack. Cole asserted Tory's language was a trigger for general racial discrimination and that dehumanizing offenders made rehabilitation more difficult.

On October 21, 2018, the eve of the election for mayor of Toronto, the Toronto Star reported that Cole claimed candidate Saron Gebresellassi had accepted a list of contact numbers from incumbent mayor John Tory of which Cole felt the public should have been informed.

=== The Skin We're In: A Year of Black Resistance and Power (2020) ===
Cole's first book, The Skin We're In: A Year of Black Resistance and Power, was announced in 2019 and released on January 28, 2020. The books focuses on 2017 and chronicles a year "in the struggle against racism in Canada." CBC Books placed the title on its 2020 winter reading list, and it became the bestselling Canadian nonfiction book for the week of February 9–15, 2020. The book saw a surge in sales in late May to early June 2020, corresponding to protests across the United States and Canada against anti-black racism and police brutality. It later became the bestselling Canadian book of 2020 and was also named one of the ten best Canadian nonfiction books of the year. In 2021, the book was nominated for the Shaughnessy Cohen Prize for Political Writing.

In the aftermath of the death of Regis Korchinski-Paquet, Cole argued for the defunding of the Toronto Police and the redistribution of funds to mental health services and initiatives to address poverty and systemic racism.

In July 2020, Cole was named one of CBC Books' "Writers to Watch".

=== 2021–present ===
In April 2024, Cole was arrested for mischief, unlawful assembly, and failing to leave the premises after participating in a pro-Palestine protest in January at the Toronto office of Awz Ventures, a Canadian venture capital firm that finances Israeli technology companies that work with Israel's Military of Defense and its security forces. Former Prime Minister of Canada Stephen Harper is a partner at AWZ and president of its advisory board, which includes former leaders of the Mossad, MI5, CIA, and CSIS. After his arrest, Cole issued statements stating that the Palestinian solidarity movement will continue to resist political repression and that the Toronto police criminalized the protest against a company aiding in the oppression of Palestinians. Recently, he has worked for The Breach, reporting on events such as the 2026 New Democratic Party leadership election.
