= Ordena Stephens-Thompson =

Ordena Stephens-Thompson is a Jamaican Canadian actress from Toronto, Ontario, Canada. Stephens-Thompson is best known for starring in the Canadian television sitcom Da Kink in My Hair as Novelette "Letty" Campbell. She is sometimes credited as Ordena Stephens.

Born in Jamaica, Stephens-Thompson was raised in Scarborough, Toronto area. Stephens-Thompson is also a frequent stage actress in the Toronto theatre scene, including productions of Da Kink in My Hair, How Black Mothers Say I Love You, and Other Side of the Game.

== Filmography ==
=== Film ===
Year	Title	Role	Notes
2009	New in Town	Leslie	
2023	Suze	Lorraine	

=== Television ===
Year	Title	Role	Notes
1998	F/X: The Series	Nurse	Episode: "Chiller"
1998	Psi Factor	Gail O'Brien	Episode: "The Kiss"
1999	Mr. Rock 'n' Roll: The Alan Freed Story	Chantel	Television film
2002	10,000 Black Men Named George	Sandi Totten	Television film
2002	Soul Food	Bonnie	Episode: "Emotional Collateral"
2004	Blue Murder	Receptionist	Episode: "Boys' Club"
2006	Cow Belles	Joyce	Television film
2006	Doomstown	Shernette	Television film
2007–2009	Da Kink in My Hair	Novelette Campbell	26 episodes
2008	Embracing da Kink	Self	Television film
2011	Committed	Dr. Bloom	Television film
2015	Odd Squad	Quarter Quinn	Episode: "Puppet Show/Mystic Egg Pizza"
2015	The Secret Life of Marilyn Monroe	Mary	Episode: "Part 2"
2017	Designated Survivor	Lainie	Episode: "Outbreak"
2018–2019	The Handmaid's Tale	Martha Frances	3 episodes
2019	The Umbrella Academy	Small Town Nurse	Episode: "I Heard a Rumor"
2020	Grand Army	Deborah Williams	3 episodes
2021	Hudson & Rex	Skye	Episode: "Into the Wild"
2022	The Kings of Napa	Doctor	Episode: "How Stella Got Her Pinot Back"
2022	Ruby and the Well	Aiysha	Episode: "I Wish I Could Find My Family"
