= The Skin We're In (film) =

- Directed by: Charles Officer
- Starring: Desmond Cole
- Music by: Michelle Osis
- Country of origin: Canada
- Original language: English

Production
- Producers: Stuart Henderson; Jake Yanowski
- Cinematography: John Price; Chris Romeike
- Editor: Avril Jacobson
- Running time: 44 minutes
- Production companies: 90th Parallel Film and Television Productions

Original release
- Network: CBS Television
- Release: March 9, 2017

The Skin We're In is a 2017 Canadian documentary film, directed by Charles Officer. Based in part on Desmond Cole's award-winning 2015 essay, "The Skin I'm In", for Toronto Life, the film documents the history and reality of racism against Black Canadians.

The film premiered as an episode of CBC Television's documentary series Firsthand on March 9, 2017. It was subsequently given a special free theatrical screening in April 2017 as part of the Regent Park Film Festival.

The film was a nominee for the Donald Brittain Award at the 6th Canadian Screen Awards in 2018.
