= Trespass to Property Act (Ontario) =

Legal statute in Ontario, Canada

The Trespass to Property Act is a statute enacted by the Legislative Assembly of Ontario, Canada. It addresses illegal entry onto private property, or trespass to land. The current Act was amended most recently in 2016.

Under the Canadian constitution, criminal law is within the realm of federal authority and anyone violating this provincial statute is therefore subject to quasi-criminal (not full criminal) enforcement under the Provincial Offences Act. The Act is an attempt to codify what was formerly a matter of common law. It is most often used by private-property owners to keep unwanted individuals off their property. There are many methods of notifying unwanted individuals that they have been banned (for future access), but the most common is a personal notice to the offender.

In general under the Act, owners must give notice either orally or in writing except where fencing is applied around gardens or areas under cultivation, or the keeping of animals. Access to the door of a building on premises for lawful purposes is protected except where specifically prohibited. A sign showing a graphic representation or wording of prohibited access is sufficient. Red markings indicate no trespassing, while yellow markings indicate limited access for certain activities. Trespassers can be fined not more than CA$10,000 and may be levied costs or damages.

Similar laws exist in Prince Edward Island and Saskatchewan.

The first Act was enacted in 1834, and was known as the Act to provide for the Summary Punishment of Petty Trespasses and other offences.
