= Hardwood (film) =

- Directed by: Hubert Davis
- Written by: Hubert Davis
- Produced by: Peter Starr; Erin Faith Young
- Cinematography: David Tennant
- Edited by: Hubert Davis
- Music by: Fraser MacDougal; Dave Palmer
- Distributed by: National Film Board of Canada
- Release date: March 17, 2005 (Cleveland International Film Festival)
- Running time: 29 minutes
- Country: Canada
- Language: English

Hardwood is a 2005 documentary short film about Canadian director Hubert Davis' relationship to his father, former Harlem Globetrotters member Mel Davis. Through interviews with his mother, his father's wife, his half-brother, and Mel Davis himself, Hubert Davis explores why Mel made the decisions that he did, and how that has affected his life.

Hardwood was met with high critical acclaim and received an Academy Award nomination for Best Documentary Short Subject. It also aired on PBS as part of its Point of View series in 2005.

== See also ==
- List of basketball films
