= Hubert Davis (filmmaker) =

Canadian filmmaker

- Davis in 2026

Hubert Davis is a Canadian filmmaker who was nominated for an Academy Award for Documentary Short Subject and an Emmy Award for Outstanding Cultural and Artistic Programming for his directorial debut in Hardwood, a short documentary exploring the life of his father, former Harlem Globetrotter Mel Davis. Davis was the first Afro-Canadian to be nominated for an Oscar.

Davis was awarded the Don Haig Award for top emerging Canadian director at the 2007 Hot Docs Canadian International Documentary Festival.

Davis' 2009 project was his documentary Invisible City. In 2012, Davis completed work on the NFB short documentary The Portrait for the Diamond Jubilee of Elizabeth II.

== Filmography ==
- Hardwood (2006) - writer, editor, director
- Aruba (2006) - editor, director, producer
- Truth (2007) - writer, director
- Stronger Than Love (2007) - director
- Invisible City (2009) - editor, director, producer
- Wapusk (2011) - director
- The Portrait (2012) - director
- Giants of Africa (2016) - director
- Rivolta (2017) - director
- Black Ice (2022) - director
- The Well (2025) - director, producer
- Youngblood (2025)

== Recognition ==
=== Awards and nominations ===
- 2004, Won Yorkton Film Festival's Golden Sheaf Award for Best Short Subject for Hardwood
- 2005, Nominated for an Academy Award for 'Best Documentary, Short Subjects' for Hardwood
- 2006, Won 'Panavision Grand Jury Award' at Palm Springs International ShortFest
- 2007, Won Don Haig award for 'Top Emerging Canadian Director' at Hot Docs Canadian International Documentary Festival.
- 2007, Won Yorkton Film Festival's Golden Sheaf Award for Best Short Subject for Stronger than Love
- 2017, Won Cannes Bronze Lion for Rivolta.
- 2022, Won the Toronto International Film Festival People's Choice Award for Black Ice.
