= Before Anything You Say =

- Theatrical poster
- Directed by: Shelagh Carter
- Written by: Deborah Schnitzer
- Produced by: Shelagh Carter
- Starring: Kristen Harris; Darcy Fehr; John Bluethner; Toni Reimer; Graham Ashmore
- Cinematography: Ousama Rawi
- Edited by: Chad Tremblay
- Music by: Keri Latimer
- Production company: Darkling Pictures
- Distributed by: MVD Entertainment Group
- Release date: July 2017 (Madrid IFF)
- Running time: 61 minutes
- Country: Canada
- Language: English

Before Anything You Say is a 2017 Canadian experimental domestic drama film directed and produced by Shelagh Carter and written by Deborah Schnitzer about a couple struggling to maintain their love and marriage even as a life-altering decision threatens to tear them apart. Carter's second independent feature film is partly autobiographical, its "impulse" based on an event in Carter's own life and another experience in Schnitzer's. The film toured mainly in Europe, at Film Festival International-organized events in 2017 and 2018, winning a handful of awards ahead of its Canadian premiere at the Gimli Film Festival in 2018, where Shelagh Carter was presented with an award by the Directors Guild of Canada.

== Synopsis ==
While on vacation in Paris, a couple are faced with a crisis when Jack (Darcy Fehr) announces his intent to pursue a dangerous job that would require him to live in Bangkok for five years, working to combat human trafficking. He assumes that his wife Isobel (Kristen Harris) will follow, leaving her life and career behind. However, Isobel is not prepared to follow blindly. Hurt and feeling misunderstood by one another, they attempt to reconcile their lives and love in Paris while Jack attends business meetings, and in their recently built dream home in Winnipeg. Both struggle with a desire to care for others without being aware of their inability to care for each other, refusing to give up despite themselves and despite the world around them.

== Cast ==
- Kristen Harris
- Darcy Fehr
- John Bluethner
- Toni Reimer
- Graham Ashmore

== Themes ==
On the surface, Before Anything You Say is a film about "life-altering decisions", but the way the film deals with the theme, the decision in question leads to an argument which brings other issues to the surface, as Sheila O'Malley points out in an interview with Shelagh Carter: Jack shuts Isobel out of his decisions, and Isobel has abandonment issues: "He is making a decision about his life and trying to involve her, but in her mind, he's leaving her." Carter said in response:

Exactly. It's there and we were trying not to flag it. It's a feeling that registers. ... I'm discovering in my next film – which has a more Chekhovian influence – that all of my work in some way is about aspects of betrayal. And abandonment. It's something really deep in me from my own childhood, and it's coming up in different forms. (Note: Carter's next film was Into Invisible Light, with a script based on characters from Chekhov's Uncle Vanya.)

The theme of abandonment is seeded throughout the film through brief inserts of other people: younger women, the woman at the coffee shop, the woman at the bar, the couple walking on the street, seeing the girls out the window, shots of long-haired women walking away from the camera:

It's tied to what hasn't been addressed within the couple. The fact that she abandoned her daughter. The fact that she's heard from her from time to time. The fact that instead Martin reaches out to her. The father takes care of everybody else's son and can't take care of his own. They're both haunted. And then there's the trafficking of women, the lack of respect for women … We wanted to gently touch on that without overkill, and we also wanted to deal with repetition. These people keep showing up. What world are they really in? Are they contaminating the two main characters? Or are they there to point out that they haven't dealt with their shit?

== Production ==
=== Inspiration and development ===
The earliest film to inspire Carter was Hiroshima Mon Amour, a collaboration between Alain Resnais and Marguerite Duras:

He always drove home working with writers and he wanted to see if cinema could tolerate language. I mean that in the best sense of the word, because as a cinema person I always think of the image, like Antonioni, for example. Antonioni would put all these pictures together and then put dialogue to the picture, and it was very sparse and much more traditionally what we conceive of as being cinematic. But I also felt that I had something to say, and so I took the story idea to Debbie Schnitzer.

Deborah Schnitzer had been collaborating with Carter since the short film Rifting/Blue (2005). At the same time, Carter's husband had just taken advantage of an opportunity which took him elsewhere, and "he was gone and here I was, in the prairies, by myself, in the place he wanted to move to." Their relationship was the "springboard" for Carter and Schnitzer, who drew on an experience of her own walking along the Champs-Élysées, an argument with her own husband of "epic proportions" whose revelations "we scarcely comprehend even now." Carter and Schnitzer talked about how painful it was, "when you miss each other, when you think you know the other person ... and then suddenly they take a Left turn. We wanted to mix some of the personal with fictional aspects."

=== Writing and casting ===
When it came to the structure of the script for Before Anything You Say, Carter wanted to play with past and present, and to experiment with memory. Talking about where the characters might have gone on vacation, it was Schnitzer who nominated Paris. "Paris is usually the place of love and nostalgia, but for this couple they can't find what Paris is." Schnitzer watched Hiroshima Mon Amour and began writing.

Around the time that Carter had gone to see Schnitzer with her story idea, they had both just seen Darcy Fehr in the role of George in a production of Who's Afraid of Virginia Woolf?: "He was terrific.". After Schnitzer sent her script to Carter, they had a reading with Fehr and Kirsten Harris, who together had played the lead roles as husband and wife "in a similar stressful difficult relationship" in Passionflower, Carter's first feature film. The two of them both said, "We've got to do this!"

=== Financing ===
It is unclear what the budget for Before Anything You Say was, or whether the film had sponsorship beyond C$12,010 raised by November 2015 on crowdfunding website Indiegogo.

=== Filming ===
==== Principal photography ====
The film was shot over six days by cinematographer Ousama Rawi, who first worked with Carter on One Night. Carter considered him "a great mentor": "Sometimes he kicks my ass and I love it. He believes in me so he's going to give me the straight goods. The bar is high. Why do we settle? No. We do not settle. I love that about him."

The film being experimental in structure, trust played an important part for the director and the two leads: "I trusted all the years of directing, I had to trust it, and I trusted these two actors. They really went for it. There was a little bit of fear, I think, to really go to those emotional places." Harris loved the role of Isobel, but was "beyond scared to do it", "actually shaking, unable to sleep" the night before the first day of shooting:

I felt I didn't have the character yet in my bones, and I think it wasn't until about 4am that I realized: this is it right here, this fear. Her whole world is being upended and she's scared. But once day one rolled around… I was so beyond happy I didn't want to go home even after hour 14.

According to Carter, Fehr was scared too: "It hit them in different ways. As soon as Kristen's on a set, she's there. Any anxiety leading up to that moment disappears and she's just there." Fehr's problem was different: he had always played characters "who need to seem to be good guys", and this character challenged him to be "brave" and to "get ugly".

And he did it, he went there. But we were all under stress about doing the film. I was wearing the producer hat as well. I had to say to Darcy, "You're just going to have to trust me." And – fantastically – being afraid, or whatever was going on, fueled his performance in a way that was fabulous.

==== Editing and post-production ====
Before Anything You Say was editor Chad Tremblay's first feature but he and Carter had already worked many times before on short films:

He's one of my former students. He was in my class on the Tuesday of September 11th. That's how long I've known him. He is a wunderkind. And we just get each other. He brings so much to the process. I'd say, "Let's try some jumpcuts." He'd say "Yeah!" And Debbie too – she's this post-modernist poet – she would love the story to be even stranger than it already is! But anyway, the three of us would look at the film and think about rhythm. Chad has a musician's background and that helps too.

Carter referred to David Mamet saying that editing is like a dream: "your subconscious is going to show you only what you want to see. And so I'd go away and I'd think about it, 'What is the ending? I don't think I want them in the shot. I think I just want their voices.' We worked with montages, and then we found it, we found the ending.

Post-production took place in Toronto under the supervision of Pete Soltesz, a producer on Carter's next film, Into Invisible Light. Soltesz told Carter when she arrived that his team were arguing about Jack and Isobel and who was right, taking sides (Soltesz was on the side of the husband): "And it was all men. 'No, I like the husband!' 'She's a bitch.' 'He's not listening to her.' 'Look how he treats her! He's not telling the truth!'"

=== Music ===
Keri Latimer is a Winnipeg musician that Carter appreciates and worked with before on Is It My Turn. "Debbie and I sent the script to her to see how she responded to the material and she really got it. We didn't want the music to be overkill. She just nailed it. It was the right person, right place, right time." The song which plays at the end credits is Latimer's This Is Not Paris.

== Release ==
The world premiere of Before Anything You Say took place at the Madrid International Film Festival in July 2017, one of several European film festivals organized by Film Festival International which also screened the film through 2018. (Note: Berlin on 3 October 2017, Milan in December; London (February 2018), Nice (May 2018), and finally Amsterdam later in 2018.)

Before Anything You Say had its North American premiere at La Femme International Film Festival in Los Angeles on 22 October 2017. The Canadian premiere took place at the Gimli Film Festival on 27 and 28 July 2018 to sold-out crowds, followed by a limited release in Winnipeg in October.

=== Home media ===
A DVD was released in 2018 by Shami Productions.

=== Streaming ===
The film is available for streaming on Amazon Prime.

== Reception ==
=== Critical response ===
Sheila O'Malley called Before Anything You Say an "extremely intense" film, a sometimes "hallucinatory" study of what happens when things are left unsaid, when trust is broken, when the mere prospect of "breaking up" becomes the cause of a break-up to start, in which both leads give "phenomenal performances".

A deeply unsettling film, beautifully written, acted, and directed, it's a poignant and profound film, and it has a "mess" to its structure and approach (I mean that as highest praise) that is a welcome change to the easily-summed-up and easily-digested material that now passes for "adult relationship" dramas.

Greg Klymkiw says the film "does not disappoint in the long-honoured snipe-fest sweepstakes" in terms of the "dazzling cinematic potential of watching two great actors verbally slugging it out against the backdrop of claustrophobic domestic strife":

Carter's previous outing Passionflower, a harrowing portrait of mental illness, solidified her position as one of Canada's leading practitioners of searingly glorious psychological melodrama and this new film manages to up the ante by delving into territory that blends the delectable properties of 70s "menopause movies" (typified by the likes of Gilbert Cates's Summer Wishes, Winter Dreams) and the sorrow-laden relationship gymnastics of Alain Resnais (Hiroshima Mon Amour).

Klymkiw goes on to praise Deborah Schnitzer's "fine" screenplay, the "sumptuous" cinematography of Ousama Rawi, Taavo Soodor's "impeccable" production design, Keri Latimer's "haunting" score and editor Chad Tremblay's "hypnotic" cutting, concluding that the one-hour drama could have "sustained itself for even longer."

=== Accolades ===
Awards

- Directors Guild of Canada, Best Manitoba Director, 2018 (presented at Gimli)
- Milan International Filmmaker Festival, 2017 • Best Director • Best Cinematography in a Feature Film
- Berlin International Filmmakers Festival, 2017 • Best Lead Actress (Kristen Harris)
- Madrid International Film Festival, 2017 • Best Editing of a Feature Film

Nominations

- Milan International Filmmaker Festival • Best Editing of a Feature Film • Best Feature Film • Best Actor (Darcy Fehr) • Best Actress (Kristen Harris)
- Berlin International Filmmakers Festival • Best Film • Best Director • Best Lead Actor (Darcy Fehr)
- Madrid International Film Festival • Best Director of a Feature Film • Best Cinematography in a Feature Film • Best Actress in a Feature Film (Kristen Harris)
- Amsterdam International Filmmaker Festival, 2018 • Best Director of a Feature Film • Best Cinematography in a Feature Film • Best Actress in a Feature Film (Kristen Harris) • Nice International Filmmaker Festival, 2018 • Best Director of a Feature Film • Best Cinematography in a Feature Film • Best Lead Actor in a Feature Film (Darcy Fehr)
- London International Filmmaker Festival, 2018 • Best Director of a Feature Film • Best Cinematography in a Feature Film • Best Actress in a Feature Film (Kristen Harris) • Best Lead Actor in a Feature Film (Darcy Fehr) • Best Original Screenplay of a Feature Film
