= Shelagh Carter =

Canadian director, producer, screenwriter, actress

- Born: 1954? (71 years old in 2025); Winnipeg, Manitoba, Canada
- Education: University of Manitoba; The New School (M.F.A.)
- Occupations: Theatre and film director, professor, film producer, screenwriter, actor
- Years active: (as film director): 2002–
- Employer: University of Winnipeg (1998–2019)
- Notable work: One Night; Passionflower; Is It My Turn; Before Anything You Say; Into Invisible Light
- Spouse: Brad Loewen
- Children: Erik Friesen (stepson)
- Parents: Dennis H. Carter; Barbara (Babs) Carter
- Relatives: Richard Carter (brother); George Carter (grandfather); Edith Carter (grandmother); Leslie R. Carter (uncle); Lisa Lewis (cousin)
- Website: http://www.darklingpictures.com/home.html

Shelagh Jane Carter (best known as Shelagh Carter, and occasionally referred to as Shelagh Carter-Loewen) is a Canadian director, producer, screenwriter, actress and retired theatre and film professor at the University of Winnipeg, known initially for her short films Night Travellers, Canoe, and Rifting/Blue, and her feature films Passionflower, Before Anything You Say and Into Invisible Light. A Lifetime Member of the Actors Studio and a graduate of the Canadian Film Centre's Directors Lab in Toronto, she is also a recipient of the award, Women in the Director's Chair Career Advancement Module 2010, in collaboration with Women in Film Festival Vancouver, among many other honours. She is a member of the Winnipeg Film Group and chair of their Board.

== Early life ==
Growing up in Winnipeg in the 1950s and 1960s, Shelagh Carter had a troubled relationship with her mother Barbara (Babs) Carter, which many years later served as the basis of her first feature film Passionflower. There is a family history of mental illness going back to Carter's grandmother. In interviews, Carter asserted that Passionflower was her own story, that her experience of her mother is "85 to 95 percent" of what is seen on the screen:

A lot of women at the time, an era of being perfect, staying in the home, repressed their anger from not being able to express themselves. The mental health industry at the time made women the problem and treated them with electroshock therapy.

It is not clear what form of mental illness Barbara Carter had: "Terms were thrown around, schizophrenic, manic-depressive. People today would say bipolar, but I don't even know if that was my mother." Carter recalled the first time she saw how her mother "broke down", "pounding on the floor", the nine-year-old Carter in her pyjamas.

Shelagh Carter's father, Dennis H. Carter, "was a product of the notably progressive faculty of architecture" at the University of Manitoba, where he "thrived", and, in 1967, co-founded the architectural firm of Smith Carter Katelnikoff, a firm "at the centre of Winnipeg's architectural renewal". As Winnipeg built with design meant to reflect the times, Dennis Carter was behind the lens of his 8mm camera, shooting reels and reels of film: "I have very fond memories of sitting at a dining room table with him when I was a very little girl with him editing the Super 8." Her father, however, was often at a loss when it came to her mother's moods, not knowing what to do; the young Carter became a "daddy's girl": "He thought he was being a great dad, but it set up this competition. What would happen is everything my mum would attempt would never get finished. But I was drawing and winning these prizes at school but it seemed if I showed her something, she would dismiss it."

When Carter was eighteen years old, when she was "really struggling" with her mother, a teacher pulled her out of class one day and took her to see a film, which happened to be John Cassavetes' A Woman Under the Influence:

And I'm looking up at the screen ... and I think, "My God, that's my mother." And people started to laugh behind me, they began to laugh at her. And ... I swear to God, I was up over those seats, I was gonna deck them, I was so mad. My teacher was pulling me off of them. And it was at that moment, at 18, that I realized that I loved my mother.

Later, she elaborated: "That's when I knew I really loved my mother and I was beginning to see that it was an illness and it wasn't her."

== Education ==
Carter moved to New York City after graduating with a degree in interior design from the University of Manitoba in 1976.

At some point, Carter's interests realigned towards the stage, and she studied acting in Los Angeles and New York. In 1995, Carter attended the Actors Studio's School of Drama (The New School), which had begun offering a Master of Fine Arts degree a year earlier. Carter graduated with an MFA in Directing in 1998, a member of the second graduating class.

== Career in theatre and film ==
On her return to Canada in 1998, Carter founded Casting in Stone Inc., to provide casting director services in film and television. The same year, Carter began an academic career at the University of Winnipeg in the Theatre and Film Department. She has said that it was not planned; it just "happened" to her.

=== Short film director ===
The first of Carter's own short films was The Darkling Plain (2002), which was recognized and honoured in cities across Canada, followed by the experimental narrative film Rifting/Blue (2005), the first of several collaborations with writer and University of Winnipeg colleague Deborah Schnitzer, and which won world festival recognition. Her third short, Night Travellers (2007), was a National Screen Institute Drama Prize winner in 2007.

In 2008, The Canadian Film Centre in Toronto invited Carter to participate in an exclusive workshop intensive (the Directors Lab, Short Dramatic Film programme) to develop film projects along with a handful of other Canadian professionals; her project was chosen for development by the centre with $250,000 in production support. With the support of the University of Winnipeg, Carter directed and completed her award-winning 35mm short One Night in the summer of 2009; it screened at several international film festivals. This was followed swiftly by two more collaborations with Deborah Schnitzer: Resolve (2009), a dance film, and Canoe (2010), based on Schnitzer's novel Jane Dying Again, an experimental narrative film which won world festival recognition. The same year, Carter was selected to attend the Women in the Director's Chair Career Advancement Module presented in collaboration with the Vancouver International Women in Film Festival.

=== Feature film director ===
Carter's first feature film originated during her time at the CFC, the autobiographical Passionflower (2011), and won film festival attention and honours. The film solidified her position as one of Canada's leading practitioners of psychological melodrama.

==== 3D film, move to Bangladesh, and Rana Plaza ====
Carter directed another experimental short film, Is It My Turn (2012), a 3D black and white dance film, again winning festival recognition. Her feature projects were put on hiatus following the Rana Plaza Collapse on 24 April 2013, when Carter's husband, Brad Loewen, was given the responsibility of implementing the Accord signed by Western clothing manufacturers upgrading the safety features of 1600 Bangladeshi garment factories; they both moved to Dhaka in December 2013 for an expected five-year term. This led to Carter producing a short documentary, Rana Plaza: Let Not the Hope Die (2014), commemorating the one-year anniversary of the tragedy, "to support his work". Is It My Turn was screened in Dhaka at the request of the Canadian High Commission in January 2015, with Carter in attendance. In August 2015, she was described as living there "part-time". As of July 2016, Loewen was still chief safety inspector for the project.

==== Return to feature films ====
Carter's second feature (and fourth collaboration with Schnitzer), Before Anything You Say (2017) is an experimental domestic drama film about a couple struggling to maintain their love and marriage even as a life-altering decision threatens to tear them apart. The film is once more partly autobiographical, based on her feelings about her husband accepting the position which took him to Bangladesh: "he was gone and here I was, in the prairies, by myself, in the place he wanted to move to." The film toured mainly in Europe in 2017 and 2018, almost overlapping with the release of her third feature, and won a handful of awards ahead of its Canadian premiere at the Gimli Film Festival in 2018, where Carter was presented with an award by the Directors Guild of Canada.

Carter's third feature, Into Invisible Light (2018), is loosely based on characters from Chekhov's Uncle Vanya, specifically Yelena and Dr. Astrov. The story is about a recent widow re-examining her life and her identity in the wake of her husband's death, unexpectedly crossing paths with an old flame from her past, inspired to take up writing years after having given it up.

Carter's fourth feature film is the romantic comedy Love, Repeat, which premiered in New York City on 17 December 2019.

==== Projects in development ====
Over the years, there have been reports of Carter working on various feature projects: a prairie noir film called The Shooting Party; a psychological thriller called Skinner, written by Rebecca Gibson, about a detective who works with child victims of Internet exploitation who begins to suspect abuse in her own family; a humanistic comedy called Dreaming of Tempests; an allegory called La Jefa; most recently, The Woman Who Swallowed West Hawk Lake, a psychological thriller, is said to be in development.

== Directing style and aesthetics ==
Carter's experiences as an actress in New York and Los Angeles led her to want to become an actor herself and to develop her own method of directing:

I discovered a lot of directors didn't know how to talk to actors. They were much more technically minded and they would talk to an actor … and I knew from my training as an actor that doesn't help an actor. It's a process ... You have to be able to help them get into character and not tell them "cry here."

Carter said in 2012 that she tries to achieve "truth on the screen": "I really want people to feel they are actually looking at a situation, it isn't cinema vérité, but I hope it's truthful. Therefore you don't 'see' any acting." Carter says that she has been told her style of filmmaking is more akin to European cinema, in that she is willing to let the film take its time and focus on older characters, and suggests that Europeans "value older people in their lives" more than North Americans, although she says "we are getting better at it", perhaps because the Baby Boomers are getting older.

== Personal life ==
In an interview, Carter described leaving home for New York City as having "escaped" her family, but there was an incident in New York: "I was walking in Greenwich Village, 8th Street, and there was a moment when my body cut off, and I was suddenly in a silent movie. I knew then that I had to deal with my feelings." She underwent psychoanalysis. In her thirties, having returned from New York, she tried talking to her mother, who was "having a bad time again." She asked her mother if she loved her and her mother said: "Dear, it's so hard for me to talk about these things." Carter knew her mother did love her "ultimately", but, she said, "boy, we missed each other on some level." By the time of the release of Passionflower, however, over the previous ten to fifteen years, her mother's mental health had become "much better" and Carter's parents "had some good time together." Looking back at her filmmaking career after the release of Before Anything You Say, Carter said she realized that her films were all "in some way" about betrayal and abandonment, and that this was "something really deep in me from my own childhood, coming up in different forms."

Carter's husband Brad Loewen and stepson Erik Friesen appear in a few of her films as a main cast member (Rifting/Blue) or an extra (Passionflower). Sheila O'Malley has been friends with Carter since their time together as students at The New School.

Carter has tended to work with many of the same collaborators and crew over several films, developing close bonds. For example, she has been collaborating with Deborah Schnitzer since Rifting/Blue (2005). She thinks of cinematographer Ousama Rawi, who first worked with Carter on One Night, as "a great mentor".

Carter resides in West St Paul, Manitoba, north of Winnipeg. She took an early retirement from her position at the University of Winnipeg "to concentrate all her energies on filmmaking" in May 2019.

== Filmography ==
=== Short film director, 2002–2010 ===
- The Darkling Plain (2002)
- Rifting/Blue (2005)
- Night Travellers (2007)
- One Night (2009)
- Resolve (2009)
- Canoe (2010)

=== Feature film director, 2011– ===
- Passionflower (2011)
- Is It My Turn (2012) • short dance film
- Rana Plaza: Let Not the Hope Die (2014) • short documentary
- Before Anything You Say (2017)
- Into Invisible Light (2018)
- Love, Repeat (2019)
