= Is It My Turn =

- Directed by: Shelagh Carter
- Written by: Deborah Schnitzer
- Based on: Spellbinding by Deborah Schnitzer
- Produced by: Hersh Seth
- Starring: Natasha Torres-Garner; Ali Robson; CindyMarie Small
- Cinematography: Danielle Sturk
- Edited by: Chad Tremblay
- Music by: Keri Latimer
- Production company: Goldenboy Pictures
- Release date: September 2012 (Lady Filmmakers)
- Running time: 6 minutes
- Country: Canada
- Language: English

Is It My Turn (originally released as Spellbinding) is a 2012 Canadian experimental digital 3D black and white dance film directed by Shelagh Carter. The film features an original score by Keri Latimer, dance performances by CindyMarie Small, Natasha Torres-Garner, and Ali Robson, and is choreographed by the dancers taking an award-winning original poem by Deborah Schnitzer as inspiration.

== Title ==
In its earliest release, the film bore the title of its source poem, Spellbinding, which won a Margaret Laurence Award. The film was re-released under its new title in 2013. Some early National Screen Institute sources mistakenly refer to the film as Is It My Turn? No question mark appears in the film's title onscreen.

== Synopsis ==
At first seen through a dome or globe, three women perform a piece of interpretive dance to music.

== Performers ==
- Natasha Torres-Garner
- Ali Robson
- CindyMarie Small

== Themes ==
Is It My Turn has been described as an "expression of the hope of the feminine, expressed through dance" and an exploration of the nature of "creative female energy" through dance. Shelagh Carter herself stated: "In capturing the moving images of three female dancers as an act of love, I return to that deep personal and professional space whose channels I have learned to open and touch as an artist.

== Production ==
=== Background and inspiration ===
Is It My Turn is based on the poem Spellbinding by Deborah Schnitzer, who in turn was inspired by Gertrude Stein. Schnitzer has collaborated with Shelagh Carter several times on her films, starting with Rifting/Blue (2005).

=== Financing ===
Carter's film received support from the Winnipeg Film Group, Manitoba Film and Music, and a film/video tax credit from the Government of Canada.

=== Filming ===
The film was shot in the University of Winnipeg's Asper Centre for Theatre and Film, "with film students handling everything from shooting, camera angles, lighting, sound and post-production."

To make the film, the three dancers were given a poem by Deborah Schnitzer, Spellbinding, and asked to interpret assigned sections through dance, their movements filmed by cinematographer Danielle Sturk, who had also made a career as both a dance artist and choreographer. Carter found that the use of the 3D camera offered an opportunity to explore the visual depth of dance choreography as it could take far greater liberties with space and time, enhancing further the film's ability to be interrupted at any moment.

=== Editing and music ===
After the shoot, the film was edited and scored, respectively, by Juno Award-winning musicians Chad Tremblay and Keri Latimer.

== Release ==
The film was initially released under the title Spellbinding, beginning its festival run in Los Angeles, at the Lady Filmmakers Film Festival in September 2012. Is It My Turn was re-released under its new title in 2013, premiering in Canada at the Gimli Film Festival on 26 July, screening in competition or as an Official Selection and award-winner in numerous film festivals in North America, Asia and Europe through to 2016, including the Canada Dance Festival as part of a programme with ten other dance films on 10 June 2016.

A special screening took place in Dhaka, Bangladesh, at the request of the Canadian High Commission in January 2015, with Carter in attendance. Carter and her husband Brad Loewen had moved to Dhaka in December 2013 when, following the Rana Plaza Collapse of 24 April 2013, he was given the responsibility of implementing the Accord signed by Western clothing manufacturers upgrading the safety features of 1600 Bangladeshi garment factories. While living there, Carter produced a short documentary, Rana Plaza: Let Not the Hope Die (2014), commemorating the one-year anniversary of the tragedy, "to support his work".

=== Online platforms ===
Is It My Turn may be viewed in its entirety on the NSI website and Vimeo.

== Reception ==
=== Accolades ===
Awards

- WorldFest-Houston International Film Festival (April 2014) • Gold Remi Award, Experimental Film
- Accolade Global Film Festival Competition (La Jolla, November 2014) • Award of Excellence: Choreography

Special mentions

- Woman & Film (Valencia, June 2014) • Experimental Film
- Accolade Global Film Competition, November 2014 • Award of Merit: Experimental, Creativity/Originality. Original Score
