= One Night (2009 film) =

- Directed by: Shelagh Carter
- Written by: Shelagh Carter
- Starring: Jonathan Ralston; Jennifer Dale
- Cinematography: Ousama Rawi
- Music by: Brian D'Oliveira
- Production company: Canadian Film Centre
- Release date: June 2009
- Running time: 15 minutes
- Country: Canada
- Language: English
- Budget: C$250,000 (approximately)

One Night is a 2009 Canadian short domestic drama film directed by Shelagh Carter, as a result of her participation in a workshop at the Director's Lab at the Canadian Film Centre. Carter's fourth film stars Jonathan Ralston and Jennifer Dale, and was screened at many international film festivals, winning three awards.

== Synopsis ==
An intruder attacks a woman, Evelyn (Jennifer Dale), and her husband, Jack (Jonathan Ralston), fails to intervene. After shooting the intruder, Evelyn forces Jack to answer for his cowardice and in so doing, realizes exactly what has robbed her life of meaning and love. She must face painful, but ultimately liberating, truths about the marriage and herself.

== Cast ==
- Jonathan Ralston as Jack
- Jennifer Dale as Evelyn
- J.D. Smith as the Intruder

== Production ==
In 2008, the Canadian Film Centre in Toronto invited University of Winnipeg film and theatre professor and filmmaker Shelagh Carter to participate in an exclusive workshop intensive (the Directors Lab, Short Dramatic Film programme) to develop film projects along with a handful of other Canadian professionals; her project was chosen for development by the centre with $250,000 in production support. With the additional support of the University of Winnipeg, Carter completed the 35mm short film in time to be released by the summer of 2009.

Cinematographer Ousama Rawi took a short break from his regular work on The Tudors to shoot One Night, in his first collaboration with the CFC:

I was pleased to have the opportunity to work on a CFC project and give back to a community that has given me so much... It was great to be challenged with a small budget and an even smaller, but super-keen crew of people. Learning to deal with limitations is crucial for film-makers. Film schedules are coming down and people are not in a position to throw money at a problem anymore but instead are asked to find creative solutions to issues. With certain filmmakers this is the ideal situation that fosters some of their best work.

Carter has said she thinks of Ousama Rawi as a mentor. They have since worked together on additional projects, including two of her feature films.

Shortly after the production was finished, Shelagh Carter and lead Jennifer Dale determined that they had a similar style of working, and would enjoy working together again on something more substantive. They developed the concept for what would become Carter's third feature film, Into Invisible Light, which was released in 2018.

== Release ==
One Night premiered in June 2009 in Toronto, as part of the Canadian Film Centre's Short Dramatic Film series. It went on to be screened at several international film festivals, including the 16th International Short Film Festival in Drama (Athens, Greece), in July 2010, where it was in competition.

=== Broadcasting ===
In February 2010, the film was purchased for television broadcast by Canwest Broadcasting. Astral Media licensed the film for broadcast on the Movie Network, April 2010 – 2012.

== Reception ==
=== Critical response ===
Reviewing the film when it played at the Montréal World Film Festival, Pat Donnelly called it a "soap opera in miniature", and remarks that Jennifer Dale "does fury with conviction."

=== Accolades ===
- Silver Remi, WorldFest-Houston International Film Festival, (2010)
- Best Director, Soul 4 Reel Film Festival, (Forestville, Maryland, March 2011)
- Best Manitoba Short Film, Gimli Film Festival (July 2011) (C$1000)
