= Samt El Abriyaa =

- Genre: Domestic drama
- Written by: Samia Kabli
- Directed by: Amare Tribech
- Starring: Sara Lalama; Djamel Aouane; Mohamed Ajaimi; Khadidja Mezini; Meriem Zebiri; Noureddine Boussouf
- Country of origin: Algeria
- Original language: Arabic
- No. of seasons: 1

Original release
- Network: Télévision Algérienne
- Release: 27 May – 25 June 2017

The Silence of the Innocent (Arabic: صمت الأبرياء, romanised: Samt El Abriyaa) is an Algerian television series, produced and broadcast by Télévision Algérienne, directed by Amare Tribech and written by Samia Kabli. It premiere on May 27, 2017 on Télévision Algérienne, A3 and Canal Algérie.

It stars Sara Lalama, Djamel Aouane, Mohamed Ajaimi, Khadidja Mezini, Meriem Zebiri, Noureddine Boussouf.

== Description ==
The series is adapted from the Turkish drama scenario, based on a difficult and almost impossible love story between Hanane the rich girl and Omar, because of the family conflicts. This causes Hanan's loss of all her wealth and money.

== Cast ==
- Sara Lalama as Hanane
- Djamel Aouane as Omar
- Khadidja Mezini
- Mohamed Ajaimi
- Meriem Zebiri
- Noureddine Boussouf
- Kamel Rouini
- Nawel Djada
- Tinhinane
- Meriem Mimouni
- Meriem Zebiri

== Series overview ==
| Country | Title | Language | Channel | Originally aired | |
| Country | Title | Language | Channel | First aired | Last aired |
|---|---|---|---|---|---|
| Algeria | صمت الأبرياء (Samt El Abriyaa) | Algerian Arabic | Télévision Algérienne | May 27, 2017 | 25 June 2017 |
| Algeria | صمت الأبرياء (Samt El Abriyaa) | Algerian Arabic | A3 | May 27, 2017 | 25 June 2017 |
| Algeria | صمت الأبرياء (Samt El Abriyaa) | Algerian Arabic | Canal Algérie | May 27, 2017 | 25 June 2017 |
