= Sara Lalama =

Algerian actress

- Born: Sara Lalama; February 14, 1993 (age 33); Constantine, Algeria
- Education: Ecole De Musique Toulon Initiation
- Occupation: Actress
- Years active: 2013–present
- Notable work: Hob Fi Kafas El Itiham

Sara Lalama (born 14 February 1993), is an Algerian actress. She had roles in the television serials Masha'er, Le rendez-vous and Hob Fi Kafas El Itiham.

== Personal life ==
She was born on 14 February 1993 in Constantine, Algeria.

== Career ==
She began her career in France Theater. She trained cinema at the Toulon Regional Conservatory (Ecole De Musique Toulon Initiation), France for four years. In 2013, she made her maiden television role in the soap opera Asrar el Madi aired on Algeria 3. With the success of the serial, she was invited to act in the comedy series La Classe in 2014. In the serial, she played the role of 'Nourhane'. Then, in 2015, Lalama played the leading role of 'Yasmine' in the television serial Hob Fi Kafas El Itiham, directed by Bachir Sellami.

In 2016, she made her cinema debut role 'Nedjma' in the film El boughi. Later in the same year, she played the role of 'Quamar', in the soapie Qoloub Tahta Ramad directed by Bachir Sellami. In 2017, she starred in the serial Samt El Abriyaa. Since 2019, she has been featured on the soapie Masha'er broadcast in both Algeria and Tunisia. In the same year, she participated in the Algerian adventure game show Chiche Atahaddak.

Sara Lalama, the top-ranked 1st Position Most Beautiful Algerian Woman according to the "Who is the 10 Most Beautiful Algerian Woman in the World Ever" list on World Women Portal Website.

== Filmography ==
Year	Film	Role	Genre	Ref.
2013	Asrar el madi		TV series	
2014	La classe	Nourhane	TV series	
2015	Hob Fi Kafas El Itiham	Yasmine	TV series	
2016	El boughi	Nedjma	Film	
2016	Qoloub Tahta Ramad	Quamar	TV series	
2017	Samt El Abriyaa	Hanane	TV series	
2017	Le rendez-vous	Sara	Short film	
2019	Masha'er	Zahra	TV series	
