= Nathan (band) =

Canadian alternative country band

- Origin: Winnipeg, Manitoba, Canada
- Genre: alt-country
- Years active: 2001–present
- Label: Nettwerk
- Members: Keri Latimer; Shelley Marshall; Devin Latimer; Damon Mitchell
- Website: nathanmusic.ca [defunct]

Nathan are a Canadian alternative country band based in Winnipeg, Manitoba. The band released four albums and won several awards, including a 2008 Juno Award.

== History ==
Nathan was formed in 2001. Band members were singer/songwriter Keri McTighe (later Keri Latimer) and bassist Devin Latimer, along with Shelley Marshal and Damon Mitchell. After their debut independent album Stranger (released 2001) won a Prairie Music Award for Outstanding Independent Album, the band signed to Nettwerk Records. In 2004, they released their second album, Jimson Weed, which won two Western Canada Music Awards, two Canadian Folk Music Awards and was nominated for the Award for Roots & Traditional Album of the Year at the 2005 Juno Awards.

In 2007, they released their third album, Key Principles, which won the award for Outstanding Roots album at the Western Canadian Music Awards and for Roots and Traditional Album of the Year (group) at the 2008 Juno Awards.

Keri Latimer has also written and performed as a solo artist, including contributions to the 2008 film soundtrack Frozen River and the 2010 Great Canadian Song Quest. In 2015, she and husband Devin Latimer have formed the band Leaf Rapids.

== Discography ==
- 2001: Stranger
- 2004: Jimson Weed
- 2006: Casserole EP
- 2007: Key Principles
