= Chiche Atahaddak =

Algerian game show

- Promotional poster
- Genre: Reality television; Game show
- Directed by: Nassime Boumaiza
- Starring: Fayçal Adjaimi
- Country of origin: Algeria
- Original language: Arabic
- No. of seasons: 1
- No. of episodes: 17 (list of episodes)

Production
- Producer: Télévision Algérienne
- Camera setup: Multiple
- Running time: 8–10 minutes
- Production company: Ciné Rêve Production

Original release
- Network: Télévision Algérienne
- Release: May 27, 2017 – present

Chiche Atahaddak (Arabic: شيش أتحداك) is an Algerian game show of challenges and adventures, created by Kanzi Ben Aziza, produced by Ciné Rêve Production, and starring Fayçal Adjaimi. It airs every day during Ramadan, starting May 27, 2017, on Télévision Algérienne, Canal Algérie and A3.

== Background ==
This nine-minute program combines watching and philanthropy, which is aimed at sick children, based on highlighting known personalities to raise a muscle-based challenge, and physical strength for this human cause.

== Series overview ==
Country	Title	Language	Channel	Originally aired	
Country	Title	Language	Channel	First aired	Last aired
Algeria	شيش أتحداك (Chiche Atahaddak)	Algerian Arabic	Télévision Algérienne	May 27, 2017	TBA
Algeria	شيش أتحداك (Chiche Atahaddak)	Algerian Arabic	A3	May 27, 2017	TBA
Algeria	شيش أتحداك (Chiche Atahaddak)	Algerian Arabic	Canal Algérie	May 27, 2017	TBA

== Episodes ==
No.	Guest	Activity	Original release date
1	Chafia Boudraa	Actress	May 27, 2017
2	Sara Lalama & Djamel Aouane	Actress & actor	May 28, 2017
3	Ahmed Riad	N/A	May 29, 2017
4	Wassila Batiche	Journalist	May 30, 2017
5	Zahia Benarous	Journalist	May 31, 2017
6	Mahraz Rabia	Journalist	June 1, 2017
7	Salim Chaoui	Singer	June 2, 2017
8	Baya Rahouli	N/A	June 3, 2017
9	Massi	Singer	June 4, 2017
10	Numidia Lezoul	Singer, TV presenter	June 5, 2017
11	Houcine Baouali	Actor	June 6, 2017
12	Azzou	N/A	June 7, 2017
13	Rym Ghazali	Singer, Actress, TV presenter, Producer	June 8, 2017
14	Nassim Djezma	Singer	June 9, 2017
15	Hakim Dekkar	Actor	June 10, 2017
16	Taha Farsous	N/A	June 11, 2017
17	Kamel Bouakkez	Actor	June 12, 2017
