= When Angels Fly =

When Angels Fly is a Canadian television film starring Jennifer Dale as Marta and Robin Ward as Sandy. For Dale, this was her first TV movie. The cast also included Patricia Collins, David Gardner, Robert Hawkins, Joan Fowler, and Robbi Baker.

== Synopsis ==
A young woman arrives at a prestigious orthopedic research and rehabilitation clinic to begin her new job as chief surgical nurse. But she has more on her mind than nursing; hidden in her suitcase is a loaded pistol. And in her single-minded determination to use it for revenge, she may destroy the most important relationship in her life.

Marta Wendell, haunted by doubts and questions about her handicapped sister Diana's sudden death, obscures her identity and secures a position at the exclusive clinic where Diana died. Fueling Marta's suspicions are Diana's last letters, centering on an illicit love affair with an unnamed doctor, and Marta's own all-too-vivid nightmares depicting Diana as a victim of foul play. Marta speculates that Diana's lover, to protect himself and his position, is either covering up the real cause of Diana's death, or worse, is himself a murderer. Marta resolves to uncover the truth and see justice done, even if she herself must administer it.

== Cast ==
- Jennifer Dale as Marta Wendell
- Robin Ward as Sandy Lorstrum
- Patricia Collins as Stephanie
- David Gardner as Dr. Lorstrum
- Robert Hawkins as Jonathan
- Joan Fowler as Mrs. Lorstrum
- Robbi Baker as Anna
