= Monster in the Coal Bin =

- Directed by: Allen Schinkel
- Written by: Allen Schinkel
- Produced by: Ellen Rutter; Allen Schinkel; Tracy Traeger
- Starring: Adam Smoluk
- Edited by: Allen Schinkel
- Distributed by: Winnipeg Film Group
- Release date: 1989
- Running time: 24 minutes
- Country: Canada
- Language: English

Monster in the Coal Bin is a Canadian short film, directed by Allen Schinkel and released in 1989. Set in the 1950s, the film stars Adam Smoluk as Furby, a young boy who must learn to confront and overcome his fears after the death of his father.

The film received a Genie Award nomination for Best Live Action Short Drama at the 11th Genie Awards in 1990.
