= Darcy Fehr =

Canadian actor

Darcy Fehr is a Canadian actor.

== Career ==
Fehr's films include Desire (2000), The Saddest Music in the World (2003), There's Something Out There (2004) and The Law of Enclosures (2000). Fehr's most notable roles have been his portrayals of Canadian filmmaker Guy Maddin in Maddin's own Cowards Bend the Knee (2003) and My Winnipeg (2007).

== Filmography ==
=== Film ===
Year	Title	Role	Notes
2000	Desire	Mr. Fergus	
2000	The Law of Enclosures	Young Miller	
2003	Cowards Bend the Knee	Guy Maddin	
2003	The Saddest Music in the World	Teddy	
2006	Appassionata	Walter Gramatté	Documentary
2006	Mr. Soul	Officer Pearce	
2007	The Good Life	Friend #2	
2007	Blue State	US Border Guard	
2007	My Winnipeg	Guy Maddin	
2007	Walk All over Me	Scarred Man	
2009	Black Field	Anderson	
2011	Keyhole	Ned	
2011	Faces in the Crowd	Bryce #7	
2011	Passionflower	David Matthews	
2012	We Were Children	Glen's Teacher	
2013	Euphoria	Bob Billinski	
2013	The First Winter	Billy	
2014	Heaven Is for Real	Lee Watson	
2015	The Forbidden Room	Nightclub Attendee / Climax Player	
2016	Considering Love and Other Magic	Roger	
2016	Before Anything You Say	Jack	
2017	Juliana & the Medicine Fish	Ron Krebs	
2018	I Still See You	Kirk's Father	
2019	The Parts You Lose	Mitch	
2019	Cranks	Dave	
2021	The Ice Road	Dave the Driver	

=== Television ===
Year	Title	Role	Notes
1999	Milgaard	Chris Milgaard	Television film
2001	Inside the Osmonds	Engineer #1	Television film
2003	2030 CE	Charles Louden	2 episodes
2003	On Thin Ice	Spider	Television film
2005	Category 7: The End of the World	Black Mask Leader	2 episodes
2010	Less Than Kind	Allen	Episode: "Party People"
2010	Keep Your Head Up, Kid: The Don Cherry Story	Lions Player	Episode: "Part 1"
2012	Verdict	Sam Mason	Television film
2014	The Pinkertons	Harry Rawcliffe	Episode: "Lines of Betrayal"
2014	Cashing In	Agent Canelli	4 episodes
2018	Burden of Truth	John	Episode: "The Ties That Bind"
2018	Colour of Scar Tissue	Social Worker	Episode: "Wii binesiikaa"
2022	The Porter	Mr. Callahan	Episode #1.6
