= Adam Smoluk =

Canadian actor, film director (b. 1980)

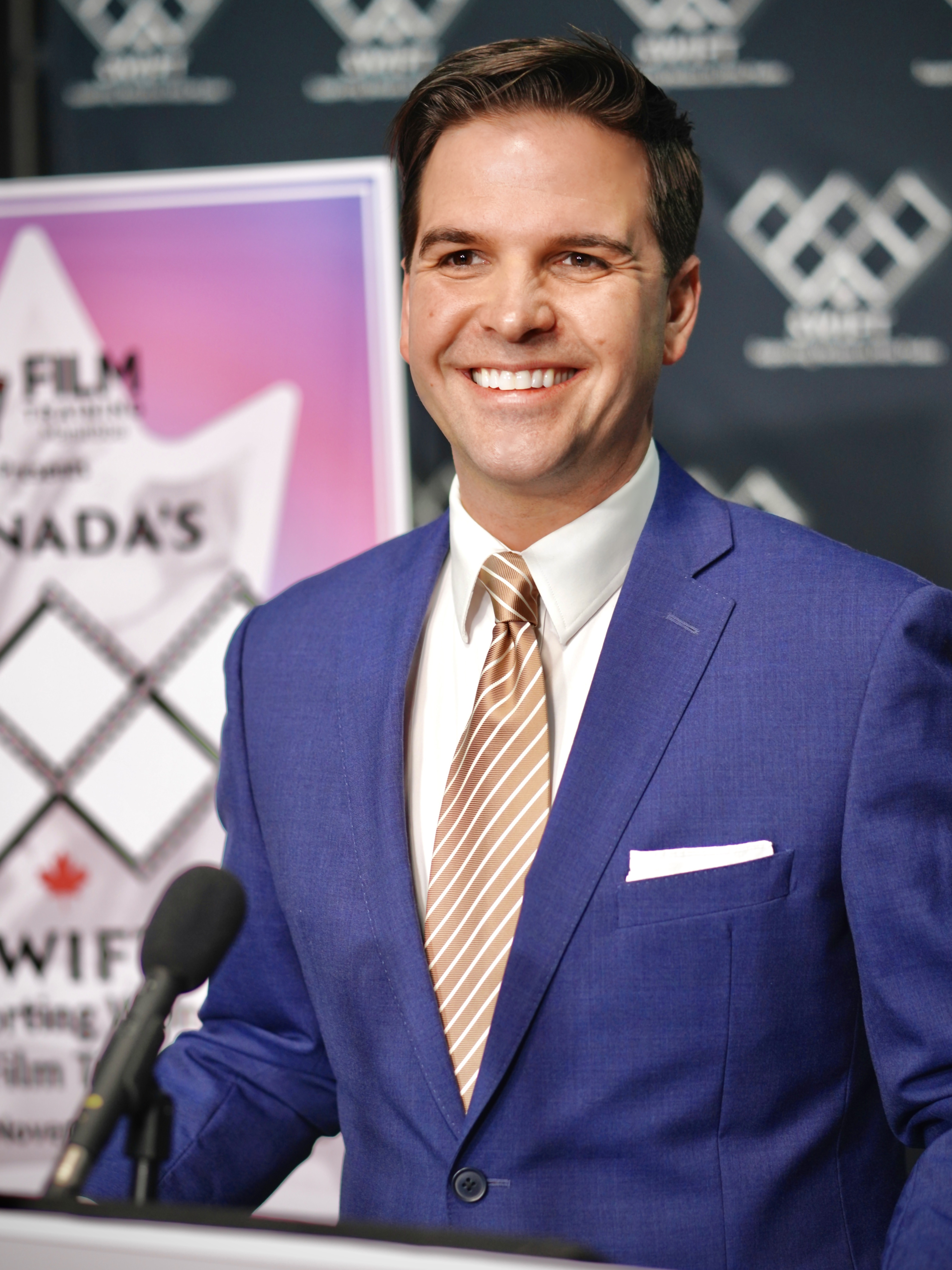
- Adam Smoluk speaking at an event in 2025
- Born: Adam Smoluk; 17 June 1980 (age 46); Winnipeg, Manitoba, Canada
- Education: McMaster University; Red River College Polytechnic; National Screen Institute; British American Drama Academy
- Occupations: Screenwriter, film director, actor and executive
- Spouse: Jennifer Smoluk

Adam Smoluk (born 17 June 1980) is a Canadian screenwriter, director, actor, community leader, and executive. His work in media productions often explores themes of alienation and isolation.

== Early life ==
Adam Smoluk was born and raised in Winnipeg, Manitoba, and grew up in the St. Vital area. As a child he developed a passion for the arts, specifically photography, writing, and theatre. After seeing Singin' in the Rain, Smoluk was in awe of the production elements of the film and said he was "blown away with the magic of film -- it was quite captivating." He was twelve years old when he purchased a used Pentax K1000 SLR camera from a neighborhood garage sale and began learning about lighting and photography.

In high school, he became interested in playwriting, and after graduation studied theatre on scholarship at the British American Drama Academy at Oxford University. Upon returning home to Canada, he began working as an actor in film and television. He attended McMaster University, a public research university located in Hamilton, Ontario, Canada and graduated with a diploma in Business Administration. He graduated with honours from Red River College (RRC)'s Human Resource Management and Management Development programs and earned a Chartered Professional in Human Resources (CPHR) designation and a Society for Human Resource Management (SHRM-SCP) designation. He was selected to RRC's 2017 billboard campaign for distinguished alumni. He was awarded a Royal Bank of Canada scholarship to attend governance training with the Rotman School of Management and the Institute of Corporate Directors.

== Community service ==
Smoluk has been active in the Alliance of Canadian Cinema, Television and Radio Artists (ACTRA) and has served on the ACTRA Manitoba Political Action Committee, and was Chairman of the ACTRA Independent Film Committee. In 2007, he was appointed to serve as ACTRA's representative on the Manitoba Federation of Labour's Human Rights Committee. In 2012, Smoluk contributed profiles of the Right Honourable Edward Schreyer and Manitoba Film & Music CEO Carole Vivier for The Winnipeg Chamber of Commerce's The Heart of Winnipeg, a book that profiles 41 Manitoban-based leaders. The publication profiles leaders who have contributed to growth and development of Manitoba.

In 2013, Smoluk was awarded the Manitoba Federation of Labour's Al Cerilli scholarship award. The MFL's Young Members Committee selects the winner on the basis of their record of commitment to the labour movement. Smoluk was appointed to the board of directors for Winnipeg's Westland Foundation, a scholarship program to support youth from Winnipeg's inner city to attend post-secondary educational institutes. He is a former member of the Board of Directors of the Winnipeg Film Group and served on the United Way of Winnipeg's GenNext Council. Smoluk was named chair of GenNext in October 2015 and he was a key organizer of the first GenNext Summit ever held in Canada. In 2019, he was appointed to the Advisory Committee for Reel Canada, which promotes Canadian Cinema.

In response to the January 2025 Southern California Wildfires, Smoluk organized fundraising within Canada to help Californians affected by the disaster. His efforts included a donation and online resources lists, and in a wide-ranging interview he stated, "It's just very deeply concerning for everyone in our industry and we felt that this was a very appropriate thing to do as an outlet for people to do something positive." He cautioned on the challenges for working people and stated, "I think people lose sight of the fact that there's a lot of middle-income working people that work and make films. Whether you're talking about working crew members or performers, actors, people who worked as agents or work at agencies. This particular event is going to affect those folks in a major, major way."

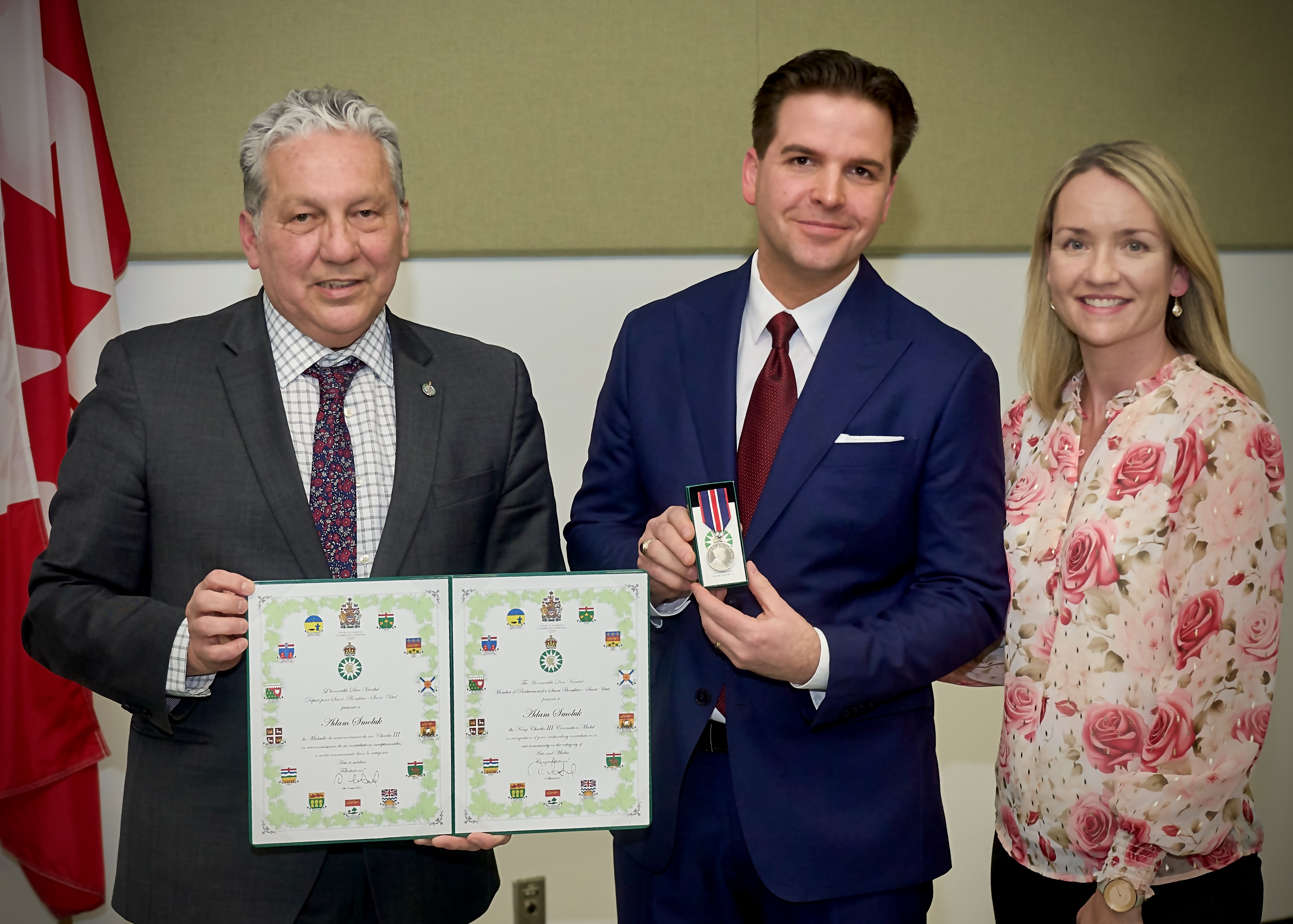
Hon. Dan Vandel selects Adam Smoluk (with wife Jennifer) for King Charles III Medal in March 2025.

The honourable Dan Vandal selected Smoluk in 2025 for the King Charles III Coronation Medal for his contributions to Canada's film industry. Upon receiving the honour, Terence Fuller the President of IATSE 856 said, "During the pandemic, Smoluk led the unprecedented delivery of nineteen film-specific COVID-19 safety sessions, which trained over seven hundred Manitoban film workers. His leadership during a turbulent period contributed to keeping our film industry workers safe."

== Career ==
Smoluk made his debut feature film, Horsethieves which was completed on a shoestring budget and was awarded the Audience Choice Award at the 2005 Winnipeg International Film Festival. Smoluk was awarded an Investors Group scholarship for leadership studies at The Banff Centre, and received the Future Leaders of Manitoba award for the Arts.

Smoluk was the youngest filmmaker ever selected to the National Screen Institute's Features First Program. In 2009, Smoluk went into production of his second feature film, Foodland. The film follows a naïve grocery clerk as his life spirals out of control when he inadvertently helps his inept manager rob the store. Foodland's cast includes James Clayton, Ross McMillan, Stephen Eric McIntyre, and Kim Poirier. The film was released in select cities in January 2011. Super Channel, Canada's only national English pay television network, premiered Foodland in October 2011. The network profiled the film in the Super Channel Gems selections. Foodland premiered on the IFC in March 2014.

Smoluk was awarded selection by an international jury to attend the eQuinoxe Europe screenwriting development program in Lindau, Germany in October 2016. He directed multiple episodes of the true crime television series, In Plain Sight for the Discovery Channel.

In 2019, Film Training Manitoba (FTM) appointed Smoluk as the managing director and in this new role, he was made responsible for all operations, financial and training activities at the Winnipeg-headquartered organization. At the time of his appointment, he was the youngest senior executive in the province of Manitoba's Department of Economic Development's Sector Council Program. He led FTM's first rebranding of its logo and colors in twenty years, as well as growth from approximately 100 to 200 participants annually to 1,400 individuals undertaking FTM's training programs.

In 2020, Smoluk and the National Screen Institute (NSI)'s CEO Joy Loewen launched a joint partnership between NSI and FTM to bring a combination of educational programming including distance learning, in-class training, career consulting and outreach to Indigenous creators and Manitoba's northern communities.

Smoluk delivered the 2020 commencement addresses at two of his alma maters, McMaster University and Red River College.

Economic Development Winnipeg profiled Smoluk's FTM and ACTRA Manitoba's inaugural BIPOC (Black, Indigenous, People of Colour) Performers Training Initiative. The CBC and BET+ series, The Porter, which started shooting in Winnipeg in May 2021, was a catalyst for FTM to create five virtual courses specifically targeting BIPOC talent. Noting the initiative as a huge success, the profile highlighted that the sessions exceeded what organizers imagined with 108 spots filled. Smoluk commented, "This initiative allows us (Canadians) to grow our workforce, not just for performers, but for other key needed areas in film and television."

Smoluk spoke publicly about the need for more filmmakers in Manitoba to access financing but noted, "It's always a very competitive industry in terms of financing. That's always a challenge, but we have some companies that have been doing so well with attracting productions and working collaboratively with the community."

In the fall of 2021, Smoluk announced the creation of the Summit for Women in Film Trades (SWIFT), which was the first major conference to take place at Red River College Polytechnic's new Innovation Centre in January 2022. The conference's goal— the first in Canada to focus on film trades — was to encourage more women to join the film industry while providing training and networking opportunities for current female film professionals. "It does have potential economic challenges for industry because when you want to carry out large-scale film productions, there's a cost to bring people from out of province to fill those labour voids," said Smoluk. "If you can improve on (the percentage of female staff), you're going to do a lot as an organization to bring more people into the industry and deal with that."

After the success of the first sold-out SWIFT conference in 2022, FTM expanded and rebranded the event to Canada's Supporting Women in Film Trades (SWIFT) 2023 Conference. Speaking of the merits of SWIFT, Smoluk stated, "You want the most talented capable workers. And if you're not attracting underrepresented workers, you're not growing your industry."

With the delivery of a major national event, former Governor General of Canada Michaëlle Jean was announced as the keynote speaker of SWIFT 2023. At a SWIFT press conference at Frank Digital's Studio, Smoluk praised Jean's accomplishments and stated, "As a woman who made strides in male-dominated fields including politics, journalism, and filmmaking, Jean was a natural choice to headline the conference." Smoluk also announced the selection of Manitoba crown attorney Chantal Boutin and Winnipeg's first women mayor Susan Thompson as distinguished SWIFT speakers.

In an electrifying development for film enthusiasts in Canada, Smoluk selected filmmaker Rory Kennedy to lead the Film Master Series Conference organized by Film Training Manitoba (FTM) in Winnipeg, Canada. The event took place on February 10 and 11, 2024, at the Manitoba Institute of Trades and Technology. The initiative was designed to foster workforce development for Canada's film industry by providing a platform for attendees to learn from world-renowned film professionals. "Rory Kennedy is an outstanding and tenacious filmmaker, and Film Training Manitoba and our partners are so honoured to be working with her to deliver this important workforce development initiative," Said Smoluk.

The Film Master Series also featured a special session with Kennedy instructing specifically for women, non-binary, and Trans participants.

During the 2024 Gimli Film Festival Smoluk announced a special film industry welcoming session held in Winnipeg for Ukrainian refugees hoping to enter Manitoba's film sector. The session would feature five Ukrainian Canadians discussing jobs and career paths within the film industry.

The first of its kind session in Canada was in response to the Russian invasion of Ukraine and a wide collection of refugees coming to Canada. Smoluk partnered with the Ukrainian Canadian Congress (UCC) and among the panelists there was a representative from ACTRA and staff from FRANK Digital, a Winnipeg-based video production company. The aim was to help fill a number of growing film positions in Manitoba by educating and eventually hiring Ukrainian newcomers in the growing sector.

Smoluk's Film Training Manitoba partnered with the Canadian Society of Cinematographers in May 2024 to launch the first large-scale training sessions in Canada for indigenous cinematographers. The session was instructed in Winnipeg by award-winning cinematographer, Luc Montpellier CSC, ASC. "Film Training Manitoba (FTM) was deeply honoured to serve as a training partner on this ground-breaking industry development program to build the skills of our film workers," said Smoluk. "This wonderful and innovative collaboration provides the most cutting-edge skills development for Manitoba's film industry. FTM is looking forward to the many more years of this exceptional new partnership."

The Winnipeg Chamber of Commerce selected Smoluk's Film Training Manitoba as one of five companies for a 2025 Spirit of Winnipeg Award. The Spirit of Winnipeg Award is selected by the Winnipeg Chamber of Commerce's Board of Directors, and recognizes outstanding corporate leadership and social responsibility. Film Training Manitoba was honoured for the organization's innovative workplace culture, and commitment to opportunity, equity and diversity for its creation of Canada's Supporting Winnipeg in Film Trades (SWIFT) conference.

At press conference in September 2025, Smoluk announced a Canada Media Fund backed project to have Rory Kennedy conduct a series of masterclasses in targeted Manitoba communities. The Manitoba Northern & Diverse Creators Program was designed to help more rural, northern, Indigenous, Black, and 2SLGBTQ+ Manitobans break into creative roles in the film industry. Canadian filmmaker Charles Konowal called the program's scope and level of collaboration, "unprecedented in Canada… a brilliant new strategy to connect underrepresented communities and cultural groups to grow our film industry."

In August 2026, Smoluk announced Pam Grier as the keynote speaker for the fifth annual Canada's Supporting Women in Film Trades (SWIFT) Conference in Winnipeg. The conference, is scheduled for October 24, 2026, at the University of Winnipeg, and Smoluk said of Grier’s selection, "We are incredibly honoured to welcome a legendary artist whose career continues to inspire women to pursue leadership, technical excellence, and lasting success."

== Filmography ==
=== As writer/director/producer ===
- Horse Thieves (2005)
- Foodland (2010)
- In Plain Sight (2019)

=== As actor ===
Film

- Monster in the Coal Bin (1989) as Furby
- Zeyda and the Hitman (2004) as Young Nathan
- Horse Thieves (2005) as Erland Eastly
- Black Bridge (2006) as Adrian Downing

Television

- Everybody's Doing It (2002) as Bobby
- The Atwood Stories (1 episode, 2003) as Rodney
- 2030 CE (6 episodes, 2002–2003) as Scotch
- In the Dark (2003) as Jimmy
- While I Was Gone (2004) as Larry
- Less Than Kind (1 episode, 2010) as Young Doctor
