= Passionflower (2011 film) =

- Theatrical poster
- Directed by: Shelagh Carter
- Written by: Shelagh Carter
- Produced by: Polly Washburn
- Starring: Kassidy Love Brown; Kristen Harris; Darcy Fehr
- Edited by: Mike Reisacher
- Production company: Telefilm Canada
- Distributed by: Multiple Media Entertainment
- Release date: October 12, 2011 (Vancouver)
- Running time: 84 minutes
- Country: Canada
- Language: English

Passionflower is a 2011 Canadian coming of age film written and directed by Shelagh Carter and starring Kassidy Love Brown, Kristen Harris and Darcy Fehr.

The film premiered at the 2011 Vancouver International Film Festival.

== Plot ==
Sarah Matthews, a creative eleven-year-old girl on the brink of puberty in 1962 suburban Winnipeg, is starved for attention in the midst of her chaotic family life. With a distracted, hardworking father and a seemingly unstable mother, Sarah's loneliness leads her to make a new friend at school. But after meeting his seemingly perfect mother, her own mother's shortcomings become harder to ignore. From the erotic seduction of dinner guests to the bouts of tortured distress in the middle of the night, Sarah grows increasingly concerned and confused with her mother's erratic behavior. As the situation dramatically worsens following an emotional visit to her mentally ill grandmother, Sarah becomes painfully aware of the extent of her mother's own illness. Sarah must force her family to come to terms with her mother's increasing mental instability.

== Cast ==
- Kassidy Love Brown as Sarah Matthews
- Kristen Harris as Beatrice Matthews
- Darcy Fehr as David Matthews

== Inspiration and themes ==
Shelagh Carter's "director's statement" asserts that as a filmmaker, she is interested in "truth in life and in relationships", and that she needed to start with herself:

Passionflower is the film that had to be done first as an artist. It is personal, honest and very committed to that "child" I was long ago. It is also a story about loving unconditionally, even if in the film, as in life, you have no way of knowing what will happen.

As a child, she had a troubled relationship with her mother; there was a family history of mental illness going back to Carter's grandmother. In an interview, Carter asserted that Passionflower was her own story, that her experience of her mother is "85% of what is seen on the screen":

A lot of women at the time, an era of being perfect, staying in the home, repressed their anger from not being able to express themselves. The mental health industry at the time made women the problem and treated them with electroshock therapy.

== Production ==
=== Development and writing ===
The idea for a film started to solidify when Carter was accepted into the Canadian Film Centre's Directors Lab in Toronto in 2009.

We had to send in two feature film treatments. I had written about my mum and me and the cat... I had written it as a short film around that time, and I showed it to my friend John and he said, "Shelagh, I think this is actually a feature, for some reason." Scenes started to come to me, all kinds of scenes, they were all over the map. To the best of my ability I wrote a treatment. It was called Hello Darling at the time. I sent it in. And ... one of the advisors said, "You're not ready to do Hello Darling" and one of the other advisors, John Paizs, who I actually knew from Winnipeg, said, "Nope, I think that's the one she should do." I wrote the party scene and I did a six minute short. It was the first time that I started to think about it as a feature.

On her return to Winnipeg, Carter was introduced to producer and fellow CFC alumna Polly Washburn in November 2009, who read the treatment and said they would make the film. Washburn would talk to Telefilm Canada while she was in Vancouver for the Olympics, assuring Carter: "We're not going to worry about going into development, we're going to go straight to production." In January 2010, Carter took a screenwriting course, "got a structure going," and sent it to Washburn for editing.

I met with Telefilm in Vancouver, and they knew me from my shorts. I told them, "We're going to make this film out in the prairies, and you want to be part of it? Because we're gonna make it anyway." I happened to take some of my drawings, of the Vargas girls, and they loved the drawings. By April, we submitted it. We had three tough phone calls. By June 1, we had the go-ahead. Because I had to be back to work in September, we had to film in August, and that's what we did. It just came out of me. I was ready. I think I was the only director that showed up at the CFC where they didn't think of me as a writer. I didn't think of myself as a writer, and that was based on my mother telling me that that wasn't my thing, and me buying into it. So it was also breaking that spell.

=== Financing and marketing ===
The film was made with the support of Telefilm, Manitoba Film and Music, and the Winnipeg Arts Council. In addition, Carter and Washburn raised US$5,920 on crowdfunding website Indiegogo towards Passionflower, when the film's working title was still Hello, Darling. The working title appears in the film's first official trailer, and was used in notices published as late as early 2011.

=== Casting ===
All of the actors were from Manitoba. Carter knew she wanted Darcy Fehr, whom she had seen in several Guy Maddin films as "Guy's alter ego": "I knew he was right and I had to put my foot down. He was busy working on Keyhole and Polly said, 'Well, I don't know if we can get him' and I said, 'No, we gotta have him.'" Carter had a meeting with Kirsten Harris and "she talked about how much she loved the script", asked some questions and Carter made a point of telling her:

I just want you to know that this is not a hate fest, this is not Mommie Dearest – this is about the illness, this is about the truth of how it all went down – so the film has to be honest that way." My mum was a tragic figure. In the early readings, I could just feel Kristen's intelligence. She just said to me, "I'm going to ask you to trust me. If I have questions, I'll ask." We hit it off. I just tried to stay out of her way.

Several years later, after Kirsten Harris had won an award for Before Anything You Say, Carter's second feature, and playing again opposite Darcy Fehr, Harris said Passionflower was one of the two most memorable roles of her career:

It was the most difficult role I've played in that she was in quite a dark place mentally and emotionally throughout, so to sustain that took a bit of a toll (suffice it to say there were some late night calls to my mom!). But maybe because of that, it was also just so magical. I'll never forget it.

The child actors were found through Carter's connections locally, as Carter intended. Even so, through Telefilm, they put the script out in a national call and received tapes from some "very serious actors across Canada ... but I just felt I could do it out of Manitoba."

In an earlier workshop, just to hear the script, I invited Kristen, Darcy, Jacqueline Guertin, Cindy Marie Small and a couple other people to do the party scene, and I had them riff off of my script. I had them in my back pocket, although I certainly looked at other actors. One of the questions was about the children working on the script, especially the little girl in that scene in the kitchen and how was that filmed? The script was given to the parents. Quite frankly, they all felt it was a piece of art, and they wanted to support the story. And Kristen and Darcy really made the kids feel that all the drama is on the screen, and off the screen, everything's cool.

The hardest character to cast was Sarah. Most of the children were too "theatrical", and Carter had in mind "the little girl who played the lead in Atonement." One day she turned to a camera man and asked if he knew anyone like that, and he said: "Oh! I know someone like that! Here's a picture!" This led to Kassidy Love Brown coming in to read the scene about the cat. "And she was so true, and there was so much going on inside of her. Polly and I just turned to each other with tears running down our faces".

=== Filming ===
Some time was devoted to rehearsals during the week before principal photography, which took place over fourteen days, of August 2010, in Winnipeg. The scene with Sarah crying on the floor shot twice. Carter described her directorial style:

I would speak to the actors in the most basic way, always in terms of a verb. It had to be active. If they needed a little bit more, we would talk about the conflict, we would talk about the circumstance, we would talk about the event, and I would really try to keep it as succinct, but loaded, as possible. I could tell when they would get it and then I would just leave them alone.

There is a scene with Kirsten Harris on a road which takes place in complete silence, which was controversial among Carter's team in post-production. The idea for the silent moment is based on Carter's experience on first arriving in New York City:

When I first got to New York, and I escaped my family, I was walking in Greenwich Village, 8th Street, and there was a moment when my body cut off, and I was suddenly in a silent movie. I knew then that I had to deal with my feelings. I wanted that experience in the film with that character.

== Release and reception ==
Passionflower has its premiere at the Vancouver International Film Festival in 2011.

=== Accolades ===
- Anchorage International Film Festival, 2012
  - Audience Choice Feature
- Prescott Film Festival, 2012
  - Jury Award, Best Narrative Feature
  - Jury Award, Best Director
- WorldFest-Houston International Film Festival, 2012
  - Platinum Remi Award for Dramatic Original Feature
  - Gold Remi Award for Editing
- ACTRA Manitoba, 2012
  - Best Actress (Kirsten Harris)
