= Jennifer Dale =

Canadian actress

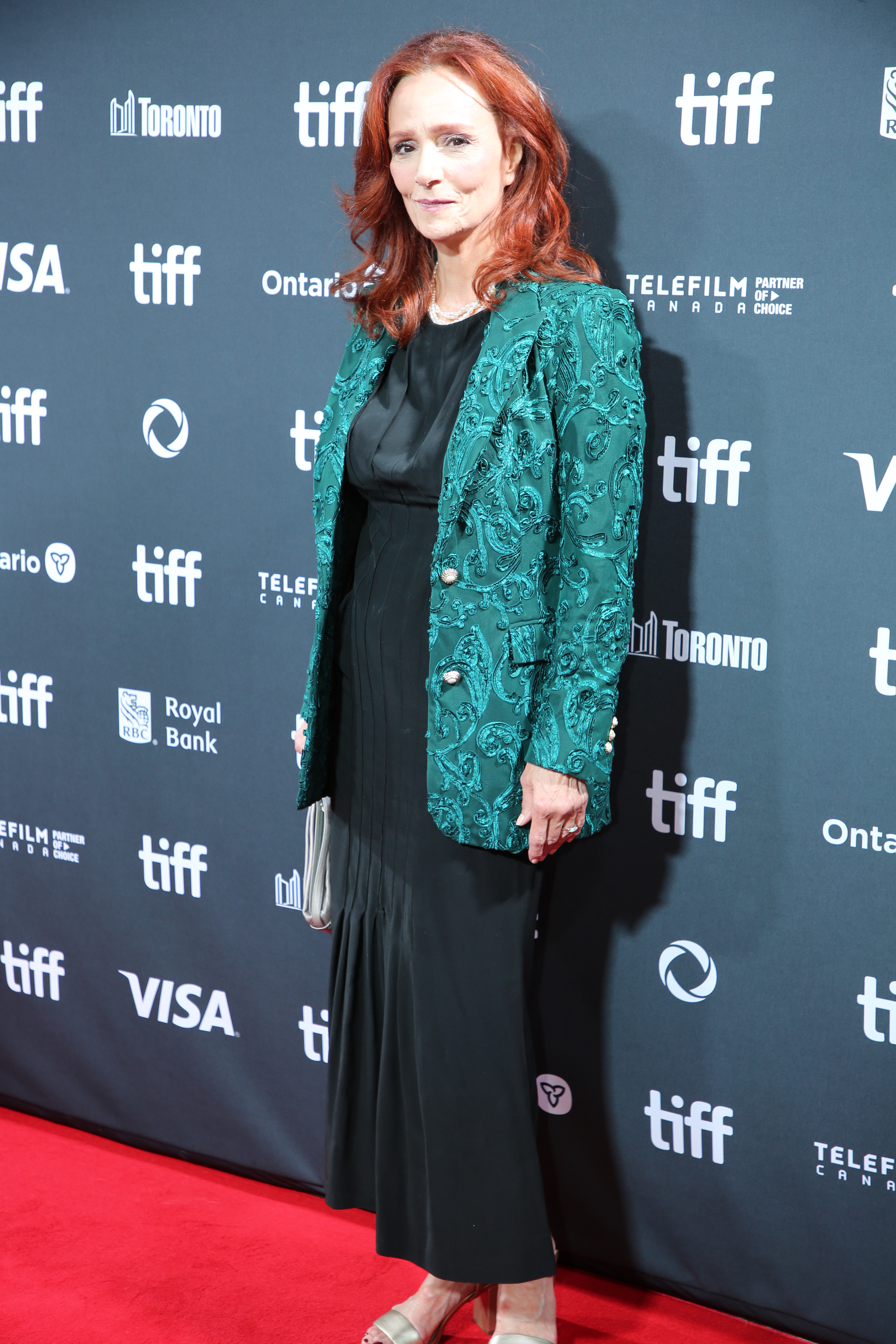
- Born: Jennifer Ciurluini; January 16, 1956 (age 70); Toronto, Ontario, Canada
- Years active: 1971–present
- Spouse: Robert Lantos (m. 1980, divorced after 1986)
- Children: Sabrina and Ariel
- Relatives: Cynthia Dale (Sister)
- Awards: Earle Grey Award

Jennifer Ciurluini (born January 16, 1956, in Toronto), known professionally as Jennifer Dale, is a Canadian actress.

== Biography ==
She is the sister of Canadian actress Cynthia Dale. From 1980 to 1986 she was married to Robert Lantos; they have two children, Sabrina and Ariel.

In 1987, she appeared in the docudrama Hoover vs. the Kennedys: The Second Civil War, which deals with a feud between J. Edgar Hoover and the Kennedys, as First Lady Jacqueline Kennedy.

She also voiced a character in Resident Evil 2, Annette Birkin.

In 2003, she received the Earle Grey Award recognizing her lifetime achievements in the Canadian entertainment industry.

== Filmography ==
=== Film ===
Year	Title	Role	Notes
1979	Stone Cold Dead	Claudia Grissom	
1980	Suzanne	Suzanne McDonald	
1981	Ticket to Heaven	Lisa	
1981	Your Ticket Is No Longer Valid	Laura	
1983	Of Unknown Origin	Lorrie Wells	
1986	Separate Vacations	Sarah Moore	
1988	Something About Love	Bobby	
1988	Martha, Ruth and Edie	Martha Gordon	
1991	The Adjuster	Arianne	
1993	Cadillac Girls	Sally	
1994	Whale Music	Fay Ginzburg-Howl	
1998	Papertrail	Dr. Alyce Robertson	
1999	The Life Before This	Laura Lorrie	
2000	Love Come Down	Bea Rosen	
2005	Matchbook Morning	Nikki	
2010	GravyTrain	Harriette Handlescock	
2011	A Matter of Justice	Lucy Lester	
2014	The Big Fat Stone	Rosie Donatello	
2015	The Dark Stranger	Dr. Anne Parsons	
2018	Clara	Astrophysics Department Head	
2018	Robbery	Roxanne	
2018	Into Invisible Light	Helena Grayson	
2018	The Remnant	Anne Hargrave	Short, post-production

=== Television ===
Year	Title	Role	Notes
1980	Bizarre	Various Roles	TV series
1983	Vanderberg	Sandra Evans	TV series
1983	When Angels Fly	Marta Wendell	TV film
1985	Love and Larceny	Betsy Bigley	TV film
1985	The Cap	Anna Diamond	TV film
1985	Empire, Inc.	Cleo	TV miniseries
1985–1987	Night Heat	Crystal / Connie Hackman / Laura Beaumont / Gail	Episodes: "Jane the Ripper", "Showdown", "The Beaumont Line", "Grace"
1986	Philip Marlowe, Private Eye	Harriet Huntress	Episode: "Trouble Is My Business"
1986	Adderly	Linda McBride	Episode: "Nina Who?"
1986	Hot Shots	Hannah	Episode: "Riot"
1986	Alfred Hitchcock Presents	Betty Jo Bennington	Episode: "The Specialty of the House"
1987	Carly's Web	Celeste Hedley	TV film
1987	First Offender	Margie	TV film
1987	Hoover vs. the Kennedys: The Second Civil War	Jacqueline Kennedy	TV miniseries
1987	The Ray Bradbury Theater	Banshee	Episode: "Banshee"
1988	The Twilight Zone	Selena Brockman	Episode: "Our Selena Is Dying"
1988	Shades of Love: Midnight Magic	Dr. Mary Cahoun	TV film
1988	The Campbells	Rachel Tremayne	Episode: "The Last Performance"
1988	Lonely Knights	Kelly Stoneham	TV film
1989	Bordertown	Kristina	Episode: "The Killing"
1989	In Opposition	Mary Margaret McCarthy	TV film
1989	Dick Francis: Blood Sport	Eunice Teller	TV film
1990	The Hitchhiker	Laura Perry	Episode: "A Function of Control"
1990	Saying Goodbye		Episode: "Thunder in My Head"
1990-1993	E.N.G.	Bridget Halliday / Brigid / Mary Kanby	Episodes: "Into Darkness", "Malicious Intent", "Pandora's Box"
1990	Counterstrike	Salomé	Episode: "Now and at the Hour of Our Death"
1991	Counterstrike	Andrea	Episode: "It's All in the Game"
1991	Street Legal	Patricia Wineberg	Episode: "Eye of the Beholder"
1991	Grand Larceny	Betsy Bigley / Mrs. Chadwick / Maisie de Laylie	TV film
1992	The Ray Bradbury Theater	Thedy	Episode: "The Jar"
1992	Street Justice	Sherry Rivers	Episode: "Catcher"
1992	Secret Service	Rachel	Episode: "The Banker and the Belle/Car Wars"
1992–1996	X-Men	Mystique	TV series
1993	Forever Knight	Baroness / Dr. Sophia Jergen	Episode: "If Looks Could Kill"
1993	Matrix	Marilynn Clausen	Episode: "False Witness"
1993	Family Passions	Yvonne Haller	TV series
1994	RoboCop: The Series	Fanny LaMour	Episodes; "The Future of Law Enforcement: Parts 1 & 2"
1994	Broken Lullaby	Gudrun Kuper	TV film
1994–1996	Side Effects	Dr. Liz Anderson	Recurring role
1995	TekWar	Lianna Cruz	Episode: "Stay of Execution"
1995	Due South	Dr. Carter	Episode: "Letting Go"
1995	Kung Fu: The Legend Continues	Teresa Keller Becker	Episode: "The Promise"
1995	Taking the Falls	Gloria	Episode: "A Tale of Two Sisters"
1996–1998	Once a Thief	The Director	Main role
1998	Silver Surfer	Nebula (voice)	Episodes: "Learning Curve: Parts 1 & 2"
1998	Dream House	Laura Thornton	TV film
1998	Mythic Warriors	Medusa (voice)	Episode: "Perseus: The Search for Medusa"
1999–2000	Power Play	Samantha Robbins	Recurring role (season 2)
2000	Live Through This	Annie Baker	Main role
2001	Made in Canada	Janet	Episode: "Alan's Ex"
2001	Mutant X	Wendy Stone	Episode: "Crime of the New Century"
2002	Guilty Hearts	Alison Carrow	TV film
2002	Monk	Barbara Chabrol	Episode: "Mr. Monk and the Airplane"
2004	Doc	Colleen Sinclair	Episode: "Who Wants to Be a Millionaire"
2004	This Is Wonderland	The Widow	Episode: "1.9"
2004	Puppets Who Kill	Black Widow	Episode: "Pizza Boys Are Missing"
2004	The Eleventh Hour	Laura McDonald	Episode: "Nadir"
2005	Harry and His Bucket Full of Dinosaurs	Book / Lips (voice)	Episode: "Abracadabra"
2005	Missing	Gail Prescott	Episode: "Last Night"
2005	Code Breakers	Mrs. Nolan	TV film
2005–2006	Get Ed	Kora (voice)	TV series
2006	Aladdin: The Magical Family Musical	Sheherazade	TV film
2006–2007	Rumours	Michelle Lawrence	Main role
2010	Men with Brooms	Joanie Parson	Episodes: "Big Changes", "Love, Smells, Funny", "Wedding Knells"
2013	Suits	Gillian	Episode: "Blind-Sided"
2014	Lost Girl	The Leviathan	Episode: "Destiny's Child"
2015	A Wish Come True	Shirley	TV film
2015	So You Said Yes	Claire Taylor	TV film
2016	Valentine Ever After	Mrs. Stanheight	TV film
2016	Four in the Morning	Dovie	Episode: "Folklore"
2017	Schitt's Creek	Trish	Episode: "Rooms by the Hour"
2017	What Would Sal Do?	Maria	Main role
2017	Saving Hope	Martha Reid	Episodes: "Doctor Robot", "Gutted", "All Our Yesterdays"
2019	Homekilling Queen	Evelyn Whitland	TV film, post-production
2019	A Very Corgi Christmas	Lizzy	Tv film
2021–2025	SurrealEstate	Victoria Roman	Recurring role
2021	Sex/Life	Vivian Mann	
2021–2022	Coroner (TV series)	Peggy, Jenny Cooper's Mom and Gordon Cooper's Wife	TV series
2024	Operation Nutcracker	Erica	Television film

=== Video games ===
Year	Title	Role	Notes
1998	Resident Evil 2	Annette Birkin	
