= Into Invisible Light =

- Theatrical poster
- Directed by: Shelagh Carter
- Written by: Jennifer Dale; Shelagh Carter
- Based on: Uncle Vanya by Anton Chekov
- Produced by: Jeff Peeler; David Soltesz; (executive producers: Jamie Brown; Julian Van Mil; Shelagh Carter; Jennifer Dale)
- Starring: Jennifer Dale; Peter Keleghan; Kari Matchett; Stuart Hughes; Jaydee-Lynn McDougall; Kristen Harris; Martha Henry
- Cinematography: Ousama Rawi
- Edited by: Chad Tremblay
- Music by: Shawn Pierce
- Production companies: Frantic Films, Studio Feather, Telefilm Canada
- Distributed by: A71 Entertainment
- Release dates: 1 December 2018 (WFF); 1 February 2019 (Canada)
- Running time: 102 minutes
- Country: Canada
- Language: English
- Budget: C$1,500,000 (estimated)

Into Invisible Light is a 2018 Canadian romantic drama film directed and co-written by Shelagh Carter and starring co-writer Jennifer Dale. Carter's third feature is an independent film loosely based on characters from Chekhov's Uncle Vanya, Dale's character being based on Yelena, and Keleghan's on Dr. Astrov. The film features an original score by Shawn Pierce.

== Cast ==
- Jennifer Dale as Helena Grayson
- Peter Keleghan as Michael
- Kari Matchett as Lydia
- Stuart Hughes as David
- Jaydee-Lynn McDougall as Monica Astrov
- Kristen Harris as Kathleen
- Martha Henry as Sonya Grayson
- Nazariy Demkowicz as Erik
- Lorraine James as M.C.
- Eric Blais as He
- Robin Ruel as She
- Karl Thordarson as Man At Dominatrix
- Jim Kirby as Professor (uncredited)
- Derek James Trapp as Student / The Bartender (uncredited)

== Release and reception ==
Into Invisible Light premiered at the Whistler Film Festival on 1 and 2 December 2018, and the rest of Canada on 1 February 2019 at Scotiabank theatres in Winnipeg and Toronto.

=== Accolades ===
Awards

- 52nd WorldFest-Houston International Film Festival, 2019 • Platinum Remi (Shelagh Carter) • Gold Remi Best Actress (Jennifer Dale)
- Italian Contemporary Film Festival (Toronto), 2019 • Special Achievement - Best Actress (Jennifer Dale)
- West Europe International Film Festival (Brussels), 2019 • Best Film • Best Lead Actor (Peter Kelleghan) • Best Supporting Actress (Kari Matchett)

Nominations

- Whistler Film Festival, 2018: official selection for the Borsos Competition for Best Canadian Feature
- Madrid International Film Festival, 2019 • Best Film • Best Director • Best Lead Actress (Jennifer Dale) • Best Supporting Actress (Kari Matchett)
- West Europe International Film Festival 2019 • Fusion Award, Best Cinematography (Ousama Rawi) • 5 other Jury Award nominations
