= Keri Latimer =

Keri Lee Latimer is a Canadian singer/songwriter and guitarist from Winnipeg, Manitoba. She is known for her work with the band Nathan, and has also performed as a solo artist and with the band Leaf Rapids. Latimer also plays the theremin.

== Early life ==
Latimer was born Keri McTighe in Lethbridge, Alberta, the daughter of Arlene and Bernard McTighe.

== Career ==
In 2001, with Devin Latimer, Shelley Marshal and Damon Mitchell, McTighe formed the alternative country band Nathan. The band produced four albums, and won several awards, including a 2008 Juno Award for best roots and traditional album. In 2005, McTighe and Devin Latimer were married.

Now known as Keri Latimer, she contributed a composition to the 2008 film soundtrack Frozen River and to the 2010 Great Canadian Song Quest. Also in 2010 she presented the Back 40 Festival's songwriters workshop.

In 2012 Latimer released a solo album, Crowsfeet and Greyskull. The album was nominated for a Western Canadian Music Award for best solo album.

In 2015, with her husband chemistry instructor Devin Latimer, she formed the band Leaf Rapids. That year the pair released their first album, Lucky Stars, and went on tour in western Canada.

Latimer provided harmony vocals for Steve Dawson's 2016 album Solid States and Loose Ends.
