= Bangladesh–Canada relations =

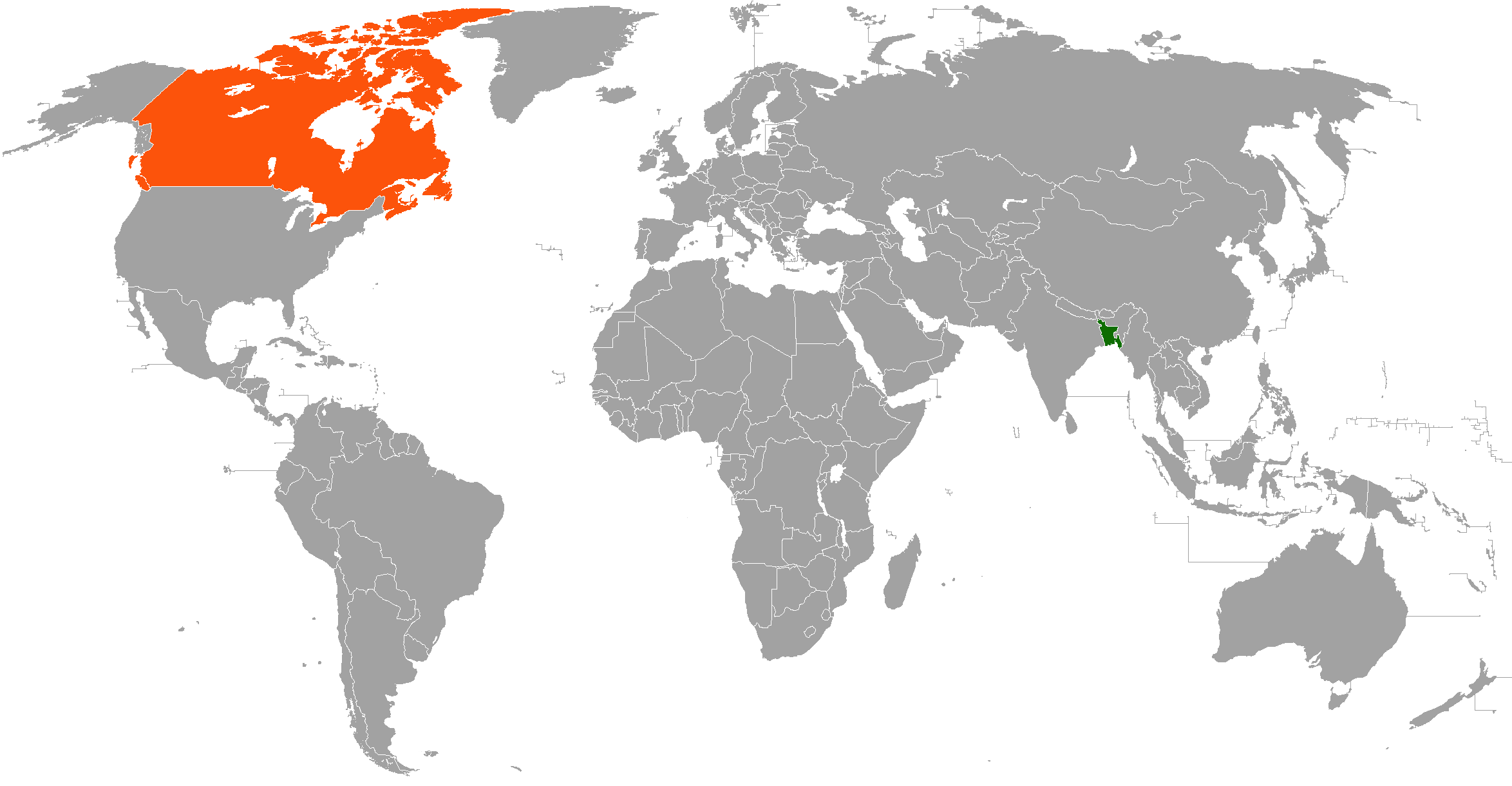

- Bangladesh: Canada

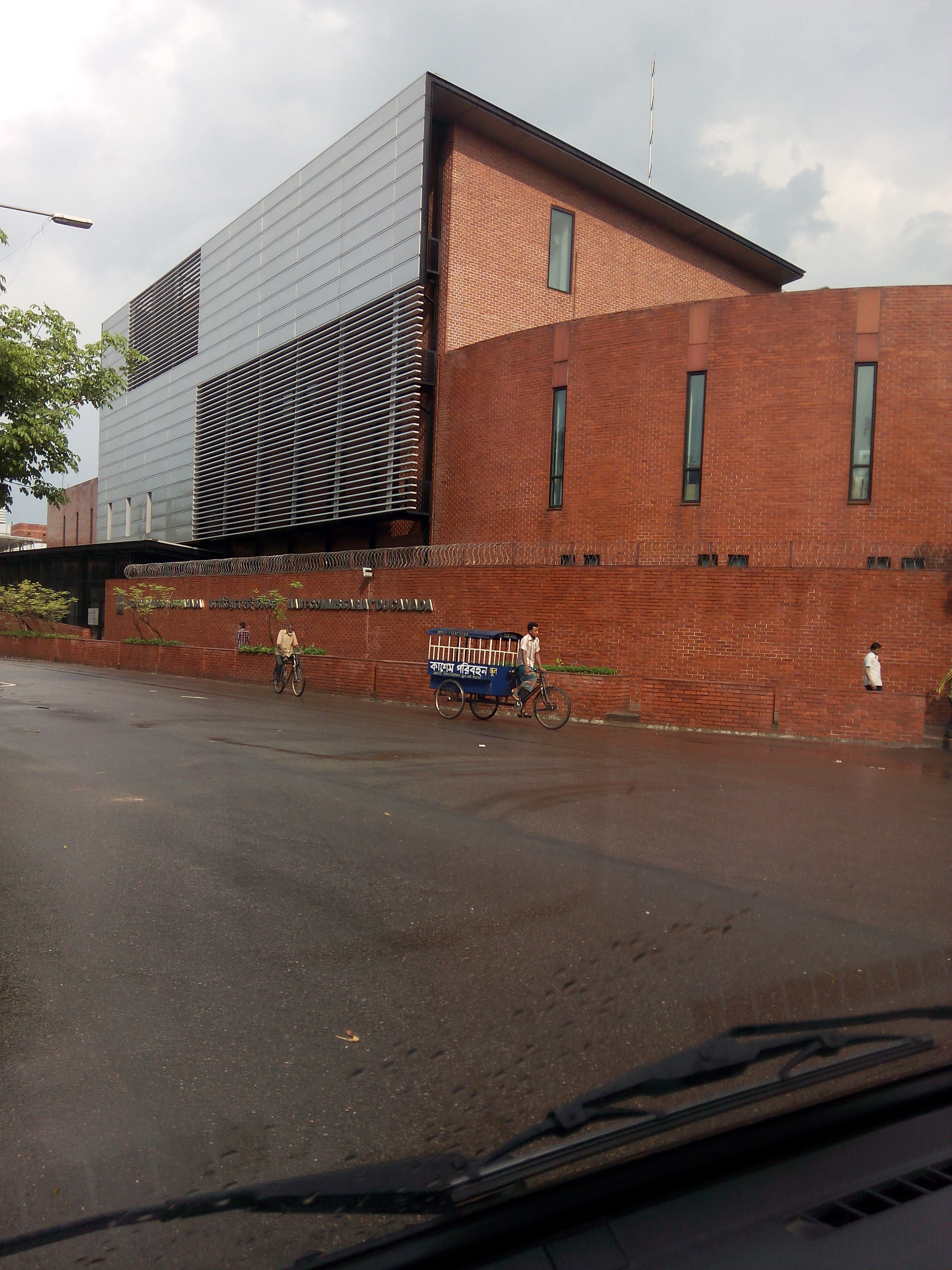
Canadian embassy in Dhaka, Bangladesh.

Foreign relations between Bangladesh and Canada were established in 1972. Canada is represented through its high commission in Dhaka, and Bangladesh is through its high commission in Ottawa. Both countries are members of the Commonwealth of Nations and the United Nations. Bangladesh receives ~$110 million from Canadian official development assistance per year as of January 2014. It is estimated that around 36,000 (2012) Bangladeshi people live in Canada, primarily in cities like Toronto, Vancouver, Montreal, Calgary, Edmonton, and Ottawa.

== History ==
Bangladesh and Canada have historically enjoyed friendly relations that have grown over the past fifty years. The political relations between the two countries date back to the time of the independence of Bangladesh. In 1971, the Canadian Government, people, and media expressed support and sympathy for Bangladesh's War of Independence. Canada was one of the first few countries to recognize Bangladesh after independence (14 February 1972). Eventually Bangladesh accredited its first high commissioner to Canada in May 1972, and Canada reciprocated in September 1973. Since then there has been a steady development of relations between the two countries. The political relationship is, therefore, supportive and cooperative, drawing upon shared links in the Commonwealth and various UN bodies.

Based upon shared values of democracy, freedom, human rights, and rule of law, the bilateral relations are focused on trade and investment, regional security, development cooperation, immigration, and people-to-people contact. As a major development partner of Bangladesh since its independence in 1971, Canada's early development efforts involved reconstruction and rehabilitation, and then gradually moved into governance and rural development, especially in the fields of agriculture, water management, primary education, and health. Canada has always been appreciative of the firm commitment of Bangladesh to promote democracy and women's empowerment. The Canadian government has also been engaged in socio-economic development in Bangladesh through various projects of the Canadian International Development Agency (CIDA).

== Country comparison ==
	People's Republic of Bangladesh	Canada
Area	Area • Total 147,570 km^{2} (56,980 sq mi) (92nd) • Water (%) 6.4	Area • Total 9,984,670 km^{2} (3,855,100 sq mi) (2nd) • Water (%) 8.92 • Total land area 9,093,507 km^{2} (3,511,023 sq mi)
Population	162,951,560 (2016 Estimate)	37,602,103 (2019 Estimate)
Population density	1,106/km^{2} (2,864.5/sq mi)	3.92/km^{2} (10.2/sq mi) (228th)
Capital	Dhaka	Ottawa
Largest Metropolitan Areas	Dhaka	Toronto
Government	Parliamentary democracy	Federal parliamentary constitutional monarchy
First leader	Sheikh Mujibur Rahman	John A. Macdonald
Current leader	Tarique Rahman	Mark Carney
Official languages	Bengali	English, French
GDP (nominal)	$419.656 billion	$1.930 trillion
GDP (nominal) per capita (2022)	US$2,785	US$
GDP (PPP) (2022)	US$1.11 trillion	US$
GDP (PPP) per capita (2019)	US$4,992	US$51,546
Human Development Index	0.608 (medium)	0.926 (high)
Foreign exchange reserves	33,100 (millions of USD)	(millions of USD)
Military expenditures	US$3.03 billion (1.2% of GDP)	US$27.6 billion (2017) (1.29% of GDP)
Active military personnel	Active troops:300,000	Active personnel 68,000 (2018) Reserve personnel 27,000
Main religions	Islam (90%), Hinduism (9.5%), Buddhism (0.6%), Christianity (0.4) and others (1%).	67.3% Christianity, 23.9% Unaffiliated, 3.2% Islam, 1.5% Hinduism, 1.4% Sikhism, 1.1% Buddhism, 1.0% Judaism

== Trade and economic cooperation ==
Comparative economic figures (2016)

Type	Bangladesh	Canada
GDP:($ billion)	302.02	2026.59
GDP per capita: ($)	1,869.97	55,938.56
GDP growth rate: (%)	6.92	1.43
Inflation: (%)	6.35	1.41
Unemployment: (%)	0	7

Bangladesh's export-import business with Canada (2005–2015)

Year	Total Export (In million US$)	Total Import (In million US$)	Balance (In million US$)
2005-06	408.78	128.00	280.78
2006-07	▲460.27	▲163.00	▲297.27
2007-08	▲539.38	▲315.72	▼223.66
2008-09	▲670.67	▲458.57	▼212.10
2009-10	▲672.49	▲593.21	▼79.28
2010-11	▲1005.55	▼549.93	▲455.62
2011-12	▲1008.55	549.93	455.62
2012-13	▲1106.69	▼533.61	▲573.08
2013-14	▲1113.83	▲572.80	▼541.03
2014-15(up to May 2015)	▲1157.78	-	-

Canada - Bangladesh Bilateral Product trade (2011–2015)

Year	Canadian Exports to Bangladesh / Bangladesh Imports from Canada	Canadian Imports from Bangladesh / Bangladesh Exports to Canada
2011	$552,546,481	$1,063,919,239
2012	▼$525,814,581	▲$1,131,190,965
2013	▲$660,482,939	▲$1,191,356,532
2014	▲$705,237,519	▲$1,225,608,927
2015	▲$904,062,220	▲$1,481,361,244
total between 2011 and 2015	$3,348,143,740	$6,093,436,907

Canada's Merchandise Trade with Bangladesh in 2017

	Canadian Imports From Bangladesh / Bangladesh Exports to Canada		Canadian Exports to Bangladesh / Bangladesh Imports From Canada	
	Merchandise Classification	% of Total Imports	Merchandise Classification	% of Total Exports
1.	Woven clothing and apparel articles	46.86	Cereals	54.42
2.	Knitted or crocheted apparel	38.83	Edible vegetables, roots and tubers	18.43
3.	Other textile articles, etc.	6.29	Oil seeds and misc. fruit, grain, etc.	4.93
4.	Headwear	1.78	Fertilizers	6.53
5.	Footwear	2.88	Iron and steel	7.35
6.	Leather articles	0.61	Boilers, mechanical appliances, etc.	1.28
7.	Fish, crustaceans, molluscs	0.58	Optical, medical, scientific, technical instrumentation	0.88
8.	Umbrellas, whips, walking-sticks	0.35	Woodpulp; paper or paperboard scraps	
9.	Furniture and stuffed furnishings	0.22	Wood and wood articles, charcoal	
10.	Ceramic products		Electrical machinery and equipment	0.73
	% of Total imports from Bangladesh / Bangladesh Exports to Canada	98.65	% of Total exports To Bangladesh / Bangladesh Imports from Canada	97.03
	Bangladeshi imports as % of total Canadian imports	0.29	Bangladeshi exports as % of total Canadian exports	0.14

Canada-Bangladesh Product Trade in 2015

	Product	Canadian Exports to Bangladesh	Canadian Imports from Bangladesh
1.	Animal & Prod.	$416,838	$4,445,848
2.	Vegetables	$753,822,607	$1,348,037
3.	Fats, Oils & Waxes	$152,053	$83,221
4.	Food	$1,021,707	$2,262,070
5.	Mineral	$2,449	$716
6.	Chemical	$73,877,793	$1,643,820
7.	Plastics, Rubber	$826,152	$1,597,192
8.	Leather, Fur	$16,191	$5,043,130
9.	Wood	$3,746,972	$218,744
10.	Paper	$5,756,002	$119,549
11.	Textiles	$1,763,825	$1,407,016,741
12.	Dress Access.	$69,441	$47,998,048
13.	Glass & Stone	$3,614	$2,429,653
14.	Precious Metals/stones	-	$13,851
15.	Base Metal	$40,412,312	$79,460
16.	Machine, Mechanical & Electrical	$12,956,777	$102,424
17.	Vehicles and Equip.	$2,437,621	$25,966
18.	Specialized Inst.	$6,156,423	$975,217
19.	Arms & Ammunition	$14,140	-
20.	Misc. Articles	$21,815	$4,415,062
21.	Antiques	$35,050	$104

The commercial relationship between Canada and Bangladesh grew dramatically from 2003 to 2013. The value of bilateral merchandise trade more than tripled, going from $478 million in 2003 to nearly $1.7 billion in 2012. During this period, Canadian merchandise exports to Bangladesh more than quadrupled, and Bangladesh became the second-largest source of Canadian merchandise imports from South Asia, after India. Canadian merchandise exports to Bangladesh were $525 million in 2012, down slightly from $552 million in 2011, while imports from Bangladesh were $1.1 billion in 2012, equal to 2011.

Canada's main exports to Bangladesh include cereals, vegetables, iron and steel, oilseeds, fertilizers, machinery, and electronic equipment. Agri-food was the leading export sector from Canada to South Asia in 2012, making Bangladesh the second-largest Canadian agri-food buyer in South Asia after India. The Canada-Bangladesh relationship is particularly important for the province of Saskatchewan. Saskatchewan's exports (mainly wheat, fertilizers, and pulses) to Bangladesh have grown more than eightfold in the 2000s, from $49 million in 2003 to $412.5 million in 2015. In 2014, a deal worth US$40 million was signed between Canadian Commercial Corporation and Bangladesh Agricultural Development Corporation for the potash export to Bangladesh. Saskatchewan Premier Brad Wall said, "It provides Canpotex with new opportunities and access to a country that really needs our potash to boost its agricultural production and achieve its food security goals".

Canada's main imports from Bangladesh include knit apparel, woven apparel, miscellaneous textile articles, headgear, fish and seafood, and footwear. Canada is a bright spot for Bangladeshi apparel, with garments and textile products making up the bulk of Canada's merchandise imports from Bangladesh. Bangladesh has enjoyed duty-free market access since 2003. Potential trading opportunities to explore include expanding Canadian imports of ready-made garments, porcelain, jute and quality jute goods, ceramic tableware, and kitchenware. Garments and textile products accounted for approximately 96% of Canada's merchandise imports from Bangladesh in 2012.

Bangladesh mainly exports apparel products ($1.1 billion by 2012), frozen fish, plastic items, headwear, footwear, ceramic products, toys, games and sports equipment, and furniture to Canada. In 2007, Bangladesh's exports to Canada were $506 million, which rose to $611 million in 2008, $706 million in 2009, $813 million in 2010, $1.078 billion in 2011, and $1.1 billion in 2014. Canada ranks as its sixth largest export destination. Thus, the issue of sustainability of exports to Canada in future years is an important one for Bangladesh.

Bangladesh imports mainly red lentils, cereals, edible oil, oil seeds, miscellaneous fruit items, fertilizer, mechanical appliances, wood pulp, paper/paperboard, scraps, and optical, medical, scientific, and technical instruments from Canada. Bangladesh is the second largest importer of Canadian food grains and other agricultural products in South Asia. Moreover, potential areas of trade from Bangladesh to Canada are shipbuilding, pharmaceuticals, leather and leather goods, and IT.

The volume of Bangladesh-Canada bilateral trade stood at US$2 billion in 2016 and aims to reach $5 billion by 2020. Canadian High Commissioner Laramée said the new Canadian Prime Minister Justin Trudeau wanted to work with Bangladesh, especially on environment and climate change issues. He also stated Canada's interest in working with Bangladesh on gender equality and in the health sector. There are also opportunities for Canadian companies to invest in the areas of food and agro-processing, IT and telecommunications, renewable energy, engineering, automotive, shipbuilding, services, and hospitality sectors.

== Culture ==
In Canada, Bangladesh's culture and traditions are observed and practised by Bangladeshi immigrants and descendants of past generations of immigrants.

== Education ==
Hundreds of Bangladeshi students immigrate to Canada every year to attend Canadian universities and colleges.

== Defense cooperation ==
Canada exported $90,018 worth of electronic equipment to the Bangladeshi military. Some Bangladeshis have received training in such areas as languages and peace support operations through Canada's Military Training and Cooperation Program (MTCP). The majority of training is conducted in Canada. Some has taken place in Bangladesh, but as of 2015 none was ongoing there.

== Bilateral issues ==
One of the key issues revolves around the question of the extradition of S.H.M.B. Noor Chowdhury, who was convicted for the assassination of Sheikh Mujibur Rehman. The Canadian government refuses to extradite him because he faces the death penalty in Bangladesh. In 2019, Canadian High Commissioner to Bangladesh Benoit Prefontaine said that Canada is 'averse' to extraditing individuals facing the death penalty. Prime Minister Sheikh Hasina, in a 2023 interview with CBC, stated that she believes that the killer, Noor Chowdhury, got away with the murder. She had earlier criticized Canada in 2015 on account of 'sheltering' Sheikh Mujibur Rehman's killer while addressing the Jatiya Sangsad in Bangladesh. In September 2023, the then Foreign Minister of Bangladesh A.K. Abdul Momen also criticized Canada for harboring Noor since 1996 in an interview.

== See also ==
- Foreign relations of Bangladesh
- Foreign relations of Canada
- Bangladeshi Canadians
