= National Screen Institute =

Non-profit organization headquartered in Winnipeg, Canada

National Screen Institute – Canada (NSI)
- Former name: Canadian Screen Institute
- Type: Film, television and digital media
- Established: April 7, 1986; 40 years ago
- Budget: $2,005,486
- Location: 141 Bannatyne Ave, Winnipeg, Manitoba, R3B 0R3, Canada
- Campus: Urban
- Chair: Marlene Kendall
- Website: www.nsi-canada.ca

The National Screen Institute – Canada (NSI; originally Canadian Screen Institute, CSI) is a non-profit organization headquartered in Winnipeg, Manitoba, Canada. The organization describes itself as "Serving content creators across Canada to tell unforgettable stories through industry-informed training and mentoring."

Established in 1986 and originally functioning as part of the University of Alberta, the National Screen Institute is Canada's oldest nationally recognized film and television training school. In 2008, the institute launched the NSI Online Short Film Festival as a year-round online short-film festival for films that are "100% Canadian."

== History ==
In 1984, Canadian filmmakers met in Edmonton, Alberta, at "Symposium 84 – Local Heroes", held during the first Local Heroes Film Festival, which showcased independent Canadian short films and features from around the world. The following year, discussions on strategies resulted in DramaLab, a hands-on development program for producers, directors, and writers to learn the film industry and develop their skills. One of the 1985 artistic directors was filmmaker Allan King, who recognized that the DramaLab program filled a void—at that time there were no filmmaking courses being offered in Canadian universities or technical schools.

Aiming to meet a need for film and television training outside large metropolitan centres, the Canadian Screen Institute (CSI) was formed on April 7, 1986, adopting both DramaLab and Local Heroes as its two flagship programs. By the end of that year, CSI changed its name to the National Screen Institute. Originating as part of the University of Alberta in Edmonton, the institute began with an annual operating budget of C$360,000 a year, one-third of which was provided by the Alberta government.

In 1990, NSI's Board of Directors introduced another program evolved from DramaLab called NSI Drama Prize, in which filmmaker participants would work to build their skills in a format that combined production incentives, mentorship and professional development workshops.

In 1997, the institute began NSI Features First, a professional development program for writers, directors and producers working on their first or second feature film. Teams met with top-level experts throughout the program and received a cash award towards the final development and packaging of their feature film projects.

In 1998, NSI opened a second office in Winnipeg. The next year, NSI introduced a second Local Heroes Festival to Winnipeg that screened exclusively-Canadian films. In spring 2001, NSI consolidated its operations in Winnipeg, transferring the Edmonton Local Heroes Film Festival to Edmonton International Film Festival Society, as well as refocusing and renaming the Winnipeg Local Heroes Festival to NSI Film Exchange Canadian Film Festival. The festival was eventually retired in 2007.

NSI Global Marketing was introduced in 2001 to prepare producers to take their projects to the international marketplace. NSI Totally Television began in 2002 providing customized, hands-on training for Canadian producer/writer teams to develop story ideas into polished packages to present to buyers in the global marketplace.

The NSI Aboriginal Cultural Trade Initiative launched in 2003, and later became NSI Storytellers. The program was designed to help Indigenous film and television producers advance their projects as international co-productions through guidance and access to new markets. The first trade mission was to Australia and New Zealand.

In 2004, after extensive consultation with the Indigenous community, the NSI Aboriginal Youth Pilot Project was launched, eventually becoming CBC New Indigenous Voices. The curriculum introduces emerging Indigenous artists to creative and challenging employment opportunities in film, TV and digital media.

The Telefilm Canada Spark Plug Program was offered in 2005 and 2006. It was a diversity initiative geared towards mid- to advanced-level visible minority and Indigenous producers with an interest in developing dramatic television programming. In 2006 DiverseTV was launched in collaboration with VisionTV and trained diverse writers to create dramatic television series for national broadcast.

In collaboration with APTN, a new NSI Storytellers program launched in 2007 with the goal of developing above-the-line Indigenous talent. The program was an early part of the creation of Cashing In, which ran for four seasons on APTN.

Featuring Aboriginal Storytellers Program was introduced in 2008 in partnership with Telefilm Canada and APTN. The program encouraged established audiovisual professionals to move into feature film. In 2008 NSI PlayWRITE was introduced to find and train undiscovered Canadian writers, helping them break into the video game industry as narrative designers.

NSI Aboriginal Journalism was introduced in fall 2010, giving students the skills needed to advance their careers in news and journalism.

In 2012, NSI Script to Screen was introduced in partnership with Corus' western-Canada pay TV service Movie Central to provide established and emerging Canadian screenwriters with robust funding, creative support and industry guidance to fully develop feature film concepts for film and television.

NSI IndigiDocs (formerly NSI Aboriginal Documentary) began in 2012 as a development launch pad for producer/director teams looking to produce a short documentary.

The National Screen Institute expanded its digital initiatives with TELUS STORYHIVE in late 2014 for content creators in British Columbia and Alberta. Applicants submit pitch ideas for a chance to win a production grant and distribution opportunities.

NSI Diverse TV Director was launched in spring 2015 for directors ready to make the leap to TV series direction with development training and job shadowing. In 2016 NSI Business for Producers was introduced in partnership with On Screen Manitoba. The program was aimed at film, television and digital media content producers and trained them in best practices for running their company.

In 2018, the National Screen Institute collaborated with the Indigenous Leadership Development Institute Inc. (ILDII) on a documentary film and training project associated with ILDII's Strengthening and Revitalization of Indigenous Languages & Cultures initiative – Indigenous Languages and Culture Documentary Project.

The National Screen Institute was contracted by First People's Development Inc. (FPDI) through funding from Indigenous Services Canada (ISC) to deliver screen-based media-skills training to Indigenous youth from First Nations communities in Manitoba.

NSI New Northern Voices was launched in 2019 and was the direct result of a National Screen Institute feasibility study and framework for northern training, supported by Manitoba Sport, Culture and Heritage, The Winnipeg Foundation and Manitoba Film & Music. The program takes place in The Pas, Manitoba, providing an introduction to media-based storytelling and production experience on a short film.

In partnership with founding and presenting sponsor, the Indigenous Screen Office (ISO), the National Screen Institute launched NSI Art of Business Management – Indigenous Edition in 2021. Participants learned business management, negotiation and leadership skills and received customized mentorship to develop their projects.

In collaboration with Film PEI and Creative PEI, NSI Market-Ready Producers – PEI Edition was introduced in 2021. Producers from Prince Edward Island developed essential producing skills and prepared a pitch package for a project currently in development.

The National Screen Institute continues to deliver training and mentorship through TELUS STORYHIVE with a podcast edition completed in 2021 and Indigenous and Black creators editions in 2022.

== NSI Online Short Film Festival ==
In 2008, the institute launched the NSI Online Short Film Festival as a year-round online short film festival for films that are 100% Canadian to encourage new talent and give creators a platform to share their films. Four times a year, an independent jury selected winning entries and cash awards including the A&E Short Filmmakers Award and a cash prize of C$2,500.

Despite its popularity, the festival operated at a loss. The National Screen Institute announced the closure of the festival in January 2020.

The NSI Online Short Film Festival provided a platform for Canadian content, programmed thousands of films and presented over $125K in award money to filmmakers. Over 1,000 curated Canadian short films are still available on the festival website.

== 2020: COVID-19 global pandemic ==
The National Screen Institute redesigned its programs and leveraged digital platforms in the early months of the pandemic, a major switch from their long history of in-person instruction. No programs were cancelled because of COVID-19.

In partnership with Film Training Manitoba, the National Screen Institute presented the Manitoba Content Creators Development Accelerator for creators to develop their story ideas while in isolation due to COVID-19.

The National Screen Institute partnered with On Screen Manitoba and The Winnipeg Foundation to present Conflict, Cooperation & HR Principles – a series of online business management workshops for local producers.

CBC New Indigenous Voices was the first longstanding program affected by COVID. The curriculum was redesigned for online delivery and the start date was postponed to fall. In place of short film projects, students created podcast episodes. The program maintained the traditional and spiritual components led by Elder Colin Mousseau.

A new, online version of NSI Business for Producers was introduced to help emerging producers nurture creative ideas in a COVID environment and beyond.

The second edition of NSI New Northern Voices launched with a focus on producers and writers developing a short film for production in 2022.

== Operations ==
=== Funding ===
The National Screen Institute currently operates with funding provided by Manitoba Sport, Culture and Heritage, the Winnipeg Arts Council, TELUS, Telefilm Canada, the Canadian Broadcasting Corporation, APTN, Bell Media, Directors Guild of Canada, Manitoba Film and Music, RBC Emerging Artists Project, documentary Channel, CBC Gem, the Centre for Aboriginal Human Resource Development, the Indigenous Screen Office, Canada Media Fund, The Winnipeg Foundation, Super Channel, National Film Board of Canada, Stantec, William F. White International and Company 3.

== Notable alumni ==
- Danis Goulet
- Jennifer Podemski
- Tasha Hubbard
- Sudz Sutherland
- Jennifer Holness
- Karen Lam
- Pat Mills
- Tonya Williams
- Josh Epstein and Kyle Rideout
- Joseph Kay
- Trey Anthony
- Norma Bailey
- Lisa Jackson
- Sean Garrity
- Adam Smoluk
- Bill Dow
- Brad Fraser
- Gary Yates
- Marie Clements
- Michael Dowse
- Robert Cuffley
- Rob Ramsay
