= Domestic drama =

Domestic drama expresses and focuses on the realistic everyday lives of middle or lower classes in a certain society, generally referring to the post-Renaissance eras. According to the English Communications Syllabus, domestic drama refers to a dramatic story containing an emphasis on its "characters' intimate relationships and their responses to [the] unfolding events in their lives." The characters, their lives, and the events that occur within the show are usually classified as 'ordinary' events, lives, and characters, but this does not limit the extent of what domestic drama can represent. Domestic drama does, however, take the approach in which it "concerns people much like ourselves, taken from the lower and middle classes of society, who struggle with everyday problems such as poverty, sickness, crime, and family strife." a domestic drama is a drama that is usually being used in comedy.

== Roots ==
Domestic is derived from the Latin domus, or home. The word domestic is defined as "of or relating to the household." Drama receives the definition of "A prose or verse composition, especially one telling a serious story, that is intended for representation by actors impersonating the characters and performing the dialogue and action," and it is derived from the Greek word drao, to act or to take action. The combination of both domestic and drama provides a literal translation of "a serious story relating to the household," clearly a synonymous definition to the given definition provided by the English Communications Syllab

== Development and history ==
Dramatic works have nearly always contained a sense of domestic drama within its fundamental plot line. Even in the early ages of Greek drama, there has been a sense of ordinary people's struggles with their lives (though this cannot be classified as domestic drama due to the incorporation of the Greek gods interfering with the common people and the enabling of the common people to have “godlike” attributes). Medieval theatre tended to express religious themes within their shows with miracles and the creation of morality plays, in which the shows were used as religious allegories. Though not yet emphasizing the ordinary lives, the development of dramatic works is slowly working towards more realistic plot lines, one of the essential elements in domestic drama.

Renaissance theatre marks the arrival of pastoral drama, drama referring to the relationships of the rustics. Though this describes the events of 'ordinary people', the shows tended to stretch realism, focussed mainly on the romantic relationships of the rustics, and were decorated with an emphasis on the comedic aspect of theater. Pastoral drama was considered to be more successful than the traditional comedies and tragedies, enforcing the further development into domestic drama.

Drama in the late seventeenth century consisted of neoclassical comedies focusing on the comedic relationships within the upper classes. This era also consisted of the Restoration drama and placed an emphasis on the usage of poetic language, "sensational incidents, and epic personages" within the show. These styles of shows are not considered domestic dramas because they focus on the relationships of the higher classes, as opposed to the middle or lower classes. This further develops into domestic drama as the plot lines become more realistic and centered around characters' relationships and their actions towards each other.

The eighteenth century marks the arrival of domestic drama as the shows start focusing on the problems of the ordinary people. The early eighteenth century playwrights used domestic drama to express the "trend toward sentimental bourgeois realism." These new domestic dramas also incorporated realistic comedies of fairly sophisticated characterizations [with] middle-class morality. These early domestic dramas are classified as part of the Romantic era of all types of arts.

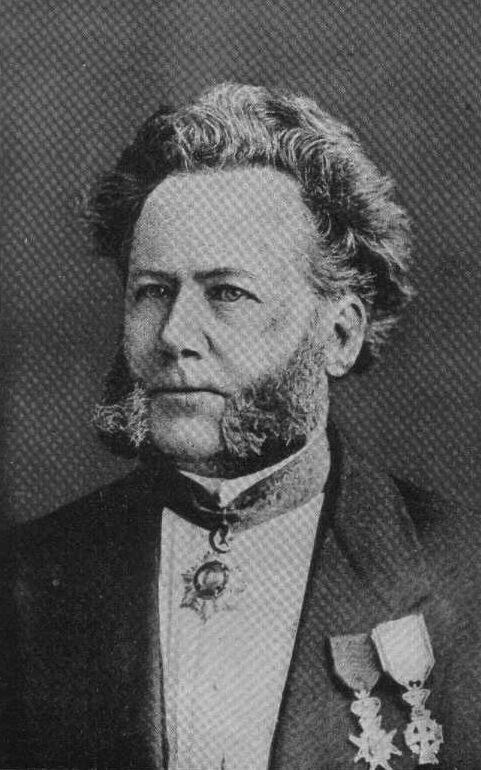
Portrait of a younger Henrik Ibsen, one of the first playwrights to adapt domestic drama into his works.

Nineteenth century drama took the complete step in incorporating realism into drama, thus resulting in more serious and philosophical drama. Characters and settings gradually developed into the realistic truths of the current society. Along with realism was naturalism: “selective realism emphasizing the more sordid and pessimistic aspects of life.” This movement of combined realism and naturalism gave way to the “slice-of-life” shows commonly synonymous with domestic drama. One outstanding playwright of this era was Henrik Ibsen of Norway. His frequent usage of realism within his shows “brought to a climax the realistic movement of the nineteenth century and also served as a bridge to twentieth century symbolism.” Ibsen used middle-class characters dealing with his complex plots and “surpassed other such works” of his time. Playwrights such as Ibsen have drawn much attention to domestic drama and have brought this method to its high significant stature in modern theatrical works.

The twentieth century introduced symbolism into the makings of domestic dramas, ultimately causing variations within domestic drama. Early twentieth century shows incorporated such psychological devices as “minimal scenery, telegraphic dialogue, talking machines, and characters portrayed as types rather than individuals.” Domestic drama suddenly became a combination of naturalism, expressionism, symbolism, and commonly used psychological affairs. The classification of domestic dramas became unclear as shows challenged new ideas and created a difficulty in determining the illusions and realism of a show.

Modern dramas usually revolve around psychological, social, and political affairs, all of which seem to have their roots in domestic drama. Modern works also use interpretive ideas, such as “distinctive voice and vision, stark settings, austere language in spare dialog, meaningful silences, the projection of a powerful streak of menace, and outbursts of real or implied violence.” The utensils of dramatic works have greatly expanded, but all still carry the roots of domestic drama. Domestic drama also carries the implications of current affairs with society: such as civil rights, feminism, and current political and sociological disputes. Current domestic drama itself tends to express the “war-at-home” style of theater, whereas twentieth century domestic drama could be classified as experimental theater or symbolic theater.

== Audience Appeal ==
Domestic drama tends to appeal to the audience because most of the audience can relate to the events within a domestic drama. The audience is appealed to this style of drama in four ways: empathy, humor, suspense, and resolution of the issues. This group of spectators can empathize with the domestic drama at hand because the domestic drama touches incidents that are common to the 'ordinary' people. Many playwright use the audience's empathy to manipulate the proposed expression of the show. David Williamson's “Brilliant Lies” uses “domestic unit battling” to create sympathy from the audience as they are confronted with the issue.

Humor provides the entertainment value within a domestic drama as these usually touch base with serious matters. The entertainment value of a show keeps the people engaged without having to continually use serious turns of events in order to maintain an audience's interest.

Suspense provides “dramatic irony” as the audience indulges itself within the characters' situation and privacy of their backgrounds. Suspense is used in a domestic drama in order for the audience to react with the characters of the show. This “[positions] the audience to feel privileged and therefore involved with the unfolding drama.”

As in all shows, an audience expects a resolution to the conflict within a show. Domestic dramas drive the show to its resolution to keep the audience desiring to reach the climax. Domestic dramas use such a technique that is very similar to the style of modern soap operas.

== Text ==
The text of a domestic drama follows a specific guideline in order to stay within this genre: subject, structure, and language. By deviating from this guideline too excessively, the classification as a domestic drama becomes problematic.

The subject of a domestic drama must be that of the 'ordinary' people. The audience (generally 'ordinarily') needs to connect with the characters of the domestic drama, and the plot must the following the “domestic sphere” of “traditional families, urban family units, or domestic households.” The subject of the domestic drama could also apply to relationships at a workplace as this does relate to the 'ordinary' events of 'ordinary' people. The subjects of concern could vastly range from poverty to family strife, from civil rights to economic injustices. Due to the audience relationship with the material of the domestic drama, most domestic dramas are most successful in the society in which the plot is direct towards because the audience is most familiar with the culture of the show.

Domestic dramas follow a fairly linear structure and generally have a sort of patriarchal figure as a representative of the family. This patriarchal figure provides the guidelines of the everyday nature of the subjects of the show. Confrontations with the patriarchal figure are also a common structure within domestic dramas.

The language used in a domestic drama generally relates with the 'ordinary' subjects of a show to reinforce the “realistic impression” of the show onto and audience. The usage of a specific language enables a specific audience to further connect with the subjects of the domestic drama as language is an “intimate personal way of communicating.”

== Social expression ==
Theater has been commonly used as a public expression of the humanitarian affairs of a certain era. From the seventeenth to the nineteenth era, drama expressed the ideals of the caste and court system, with nobility on high and rustics down low. This expression gave way to the public in order to see and understand how this system was to work within their society. Some might say that theater has played a very important role in the shaping of societies when used in this way. Nineteenth century induced the importance of the middle-class within drama and introduced the role of the bourgeois and the usage of aristocratic entertainment.

The political aspects of a certain era were inevitably present within these shows, especially shows leading towards domestic drama. Theater was considered to have “good [socially] position” characters against the immoral acts of society, usually a sort of infringement against a certain code of behavior. Theater was the way to explain the rights and wrongs of a certain lifestyle in a society, especially if the characters were of the 'ordinary' people so that the audience could relate with the characters. Modern drama changed this aspect of theater as it was not directed towards any one class in society, but rather the collaboration of the artistic aspects within these classes. Such a combination created much difficulty in domestic drama as domestic drama appeals to a specific class.

== Sources ==
1. Domestic Drama by Maddy Ritchard and Anna Forward
2. Encyclopædia Britannica 15th Edition (2007)
