= Gimli Film Festival =

Film festival in Manitoba, Canada

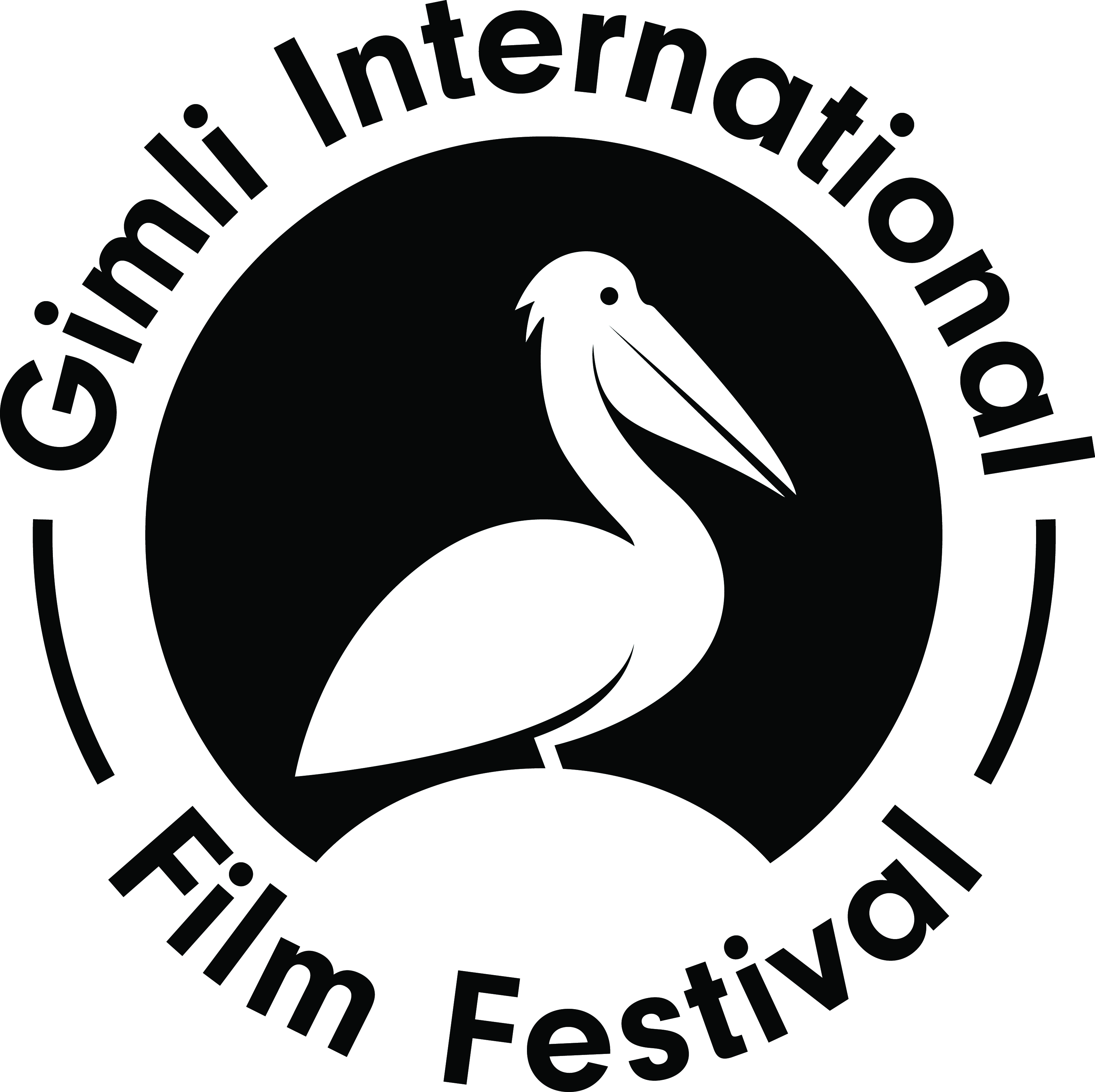
Gimli International Film Festival

The Gimli International Film Festival is a Canadian film festival, held annually in Gimli, Manitoba. It is Manitoba's largest film festival and the largest rural film festival in all of Canada. The festival showcases a mix of narrative, documentary and experimental feature films and short films.

== History ==
The Gimli International Film Festival began in 2001, originally launched as an outgrowth of the town's Islendingadagurinn festival of Icelandic Canadian culture.

The festival takes place annually on the last weekend of July and has grown to include four indoor venues (three of which are built inside of community churches), industry workshops and events, an annual $10,000 emerging filmmaker pitch competition, a 48 Hour Filmmaking Challenge, and a variety of awards and parties. The festival is also known for its free outdoor beach film screenings, where films are projected on an 11-meter-tall screen erected annually in the waters of Lake Winnipeg.

The festival was founded in part by former Senator Janis Johnson. Board members have included Norma Bailey and CBC's Terry McLeod.

The current executive director is Teya Zuzek.

During the 2024 Gimli Film Festival, Film Training Manitoba's Adam Smoluk announced the creation of a special film industry welcoming session held in Winnipeg for Ukrainian refugees hoping to enter Manitoba's film sector. The session would feature five Ukrainian Canadians discussing jobs and career paths within the film industry. The first of its kind session in Canada was in response to the Russian invasion of Ukraine and a wide collection of refugees coming to Canada. Smoluk announced the session was in partnership with the Ukrainian Canadian Congress(UCC) and among the panelists there was a representative from ACTRA and staff from FRANK Digital, a Winnipeg-based video production company.
