= Frederick Dally =

English-Canadian photographer (1838–1914)

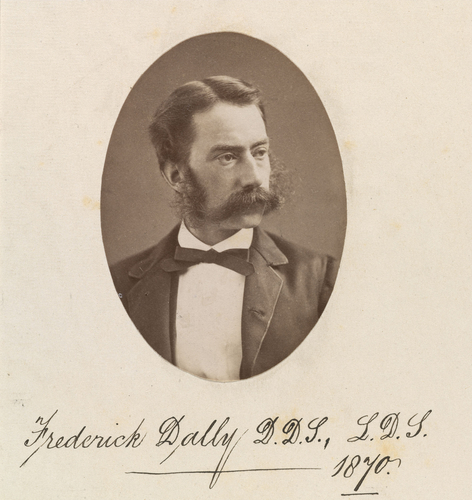
- Frederick Dally in 1870
- Born: July 29, 1838; Southwark, London, England
- Died: July 28, 1914 (aged 75); Wolverhampton, Staffordshire, England
- Known for: Photographer

Frederick Dally (July 29, 1838 – July 28, 1914) was an English Canadian portrait and landscape photographer best known for his views of the Cariboo goldfields in British Columbia.

== Early life and Victoria ==
He was born on July 29, 1838, in Southwark, a district of London, England, the youngest of nine children. Educated at Christ's Hospital, London, he served an apprenticeship with a linen and woollen draper. At the age of 24, Dally emigrated to British North America, arriving in Victoria on the Colony of Vancouver Island in September 1862. He opened up a dry goods store, and a few years later he sold his stock and set up a photographic gallery in June 1866. His commissions for photography in Victoria were varied, encompassing portraits of prominent citizens, public buildings, and street scenes, and he sometimes took pictures at the request of the Colonial Office. He also documented the presence of the government and that of the Royal Navy. An acquaintance was the photographer and assayist Francis George Claudet, son of the fashionable London photographer Antoine Claudet, who was in Canada for the Royal Mint. A focal point of Dally's business was marketing cartes de visites of First Nations people, including both studio and field images. (Note: Dally produced seventy-seven (or possibly seventy-eight) cartes de visite of First Nations people. Blackman further remarks that he was the most productive as well as the most skillful of the Victoria carte-makers.)

== Field excursions ==
In August 1866, Dally accompanied the governor of Vancouver Island, Arthur Edward Kennedy, aboard HMS Scout on its circumnavigation tour of Vancouver Island with stops to inspect local villages. On the west coast, he only managed to produce two negatives, but on the eastern side he had better results, photographing at Fort Rupert, Comox, Cowichan, and Nanaimo. At Cowichan he took a pair of photographs of salmon weirs which are the earliest examples known. In a view taken in the same locality, the full range of Dally's compositional powers can be seen in his depiction of a Coast Salish Quamichan village.

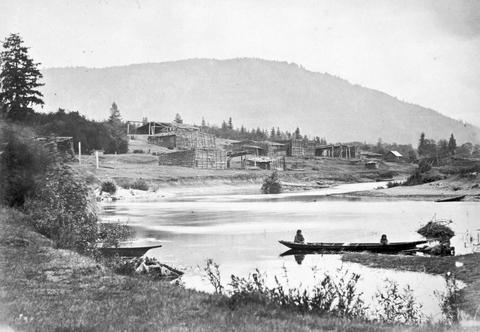
Quamichan village near the Cowichan River, 1866.

Two years later in 1868, he made a month-long trip up the Cariboo Road to the gold-rush town of Barkerville, photographing the route as well as the mining claims. The following year he returned to Barkerville, this time building a studio, only to see it destroyed a few weeks later in the fire that engulfed the town on September 16, 1868. Dally's manuscript is the only surviving written account of the disaster. Less than two months later he was back in Victoria, where he continued to photograph until September 1870 when he sold his gallery to the Green Brothers, a local firm. Sometime thereafter, his glass-plate negatives and probably his stock of prints passed into the hands of the Victoria photographers Richard and Hannah Maynard, who then sold Dally's images under their own imprints.

== Later years ==
Dally left Victoria in 1870 to study dentistry in Philadelphia, and two years later, he returned to England, where he practiced dental surgery until his retirement at age 71. His interest in British Columbia never waned, and he offered his expertise and collections to the Royal Geographical Society and the British Museum. In 1883 he presented an album of his British Columbia views to Queen Victoria. He died in Wolverhampton on July 28, 1914.

== Reputation ==
Dally is considered to have taken some of the finest Canadian photographs of the 1860s, and in particular his work in the Cariboo goldfields and Barkerville is thought to be outstanding. According to the foremost authority on Dally, Joan Schwartz, "his visual record of the beginnings of British Columbia surpassed those of his contemporaries in artistic ability, technical skill and market appeal." Many of his views were used as the basis of engravings for the pictorial press, and his photographs of wagons being pulled by ten-mule teams over the Cariboo Road have been used to illustrate books on the history of British Columbia.

== Gallery ==
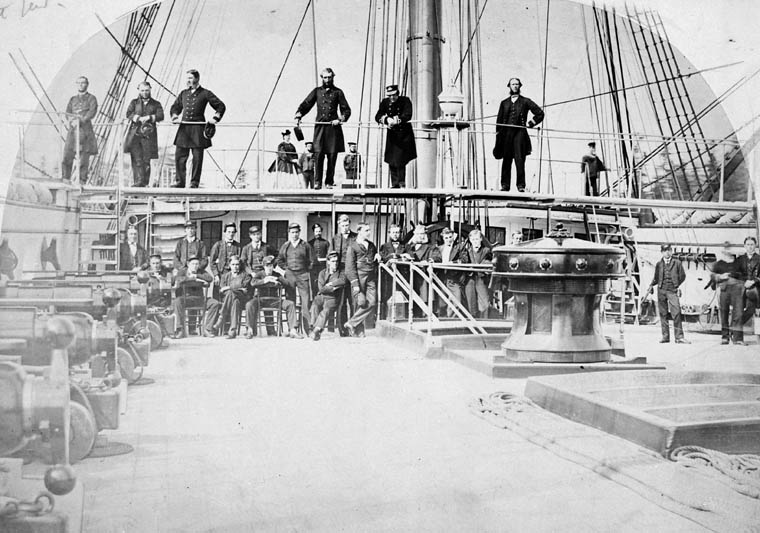
Officers and crew of HMS Sutlej. 1866–1869.

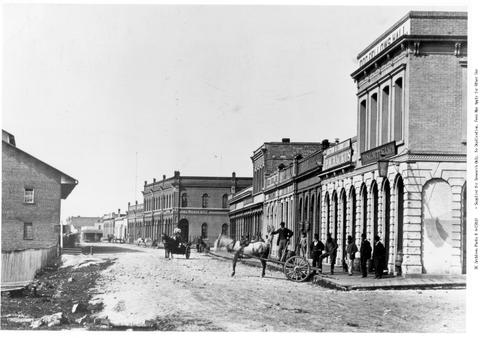
Looking north on Wharf street from Fort street, Victoria. 1866–1870.

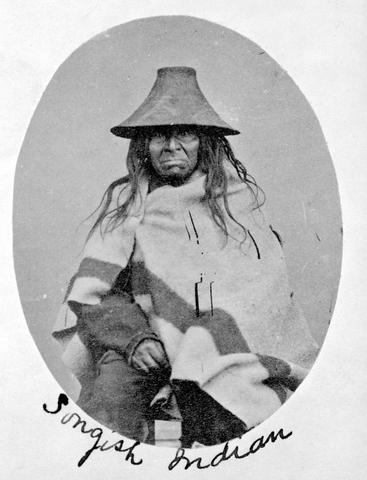
Member of the Songhees First Nation. 1866–1870.

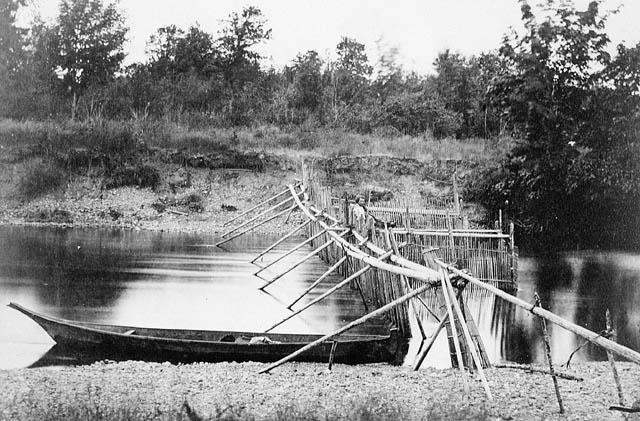
Salmon weir on the Cowichan River. 1866.

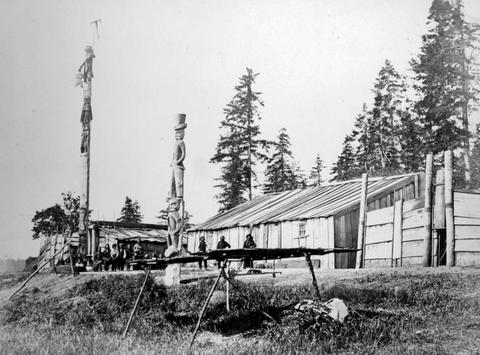
Totem poles, Comox. 1866.

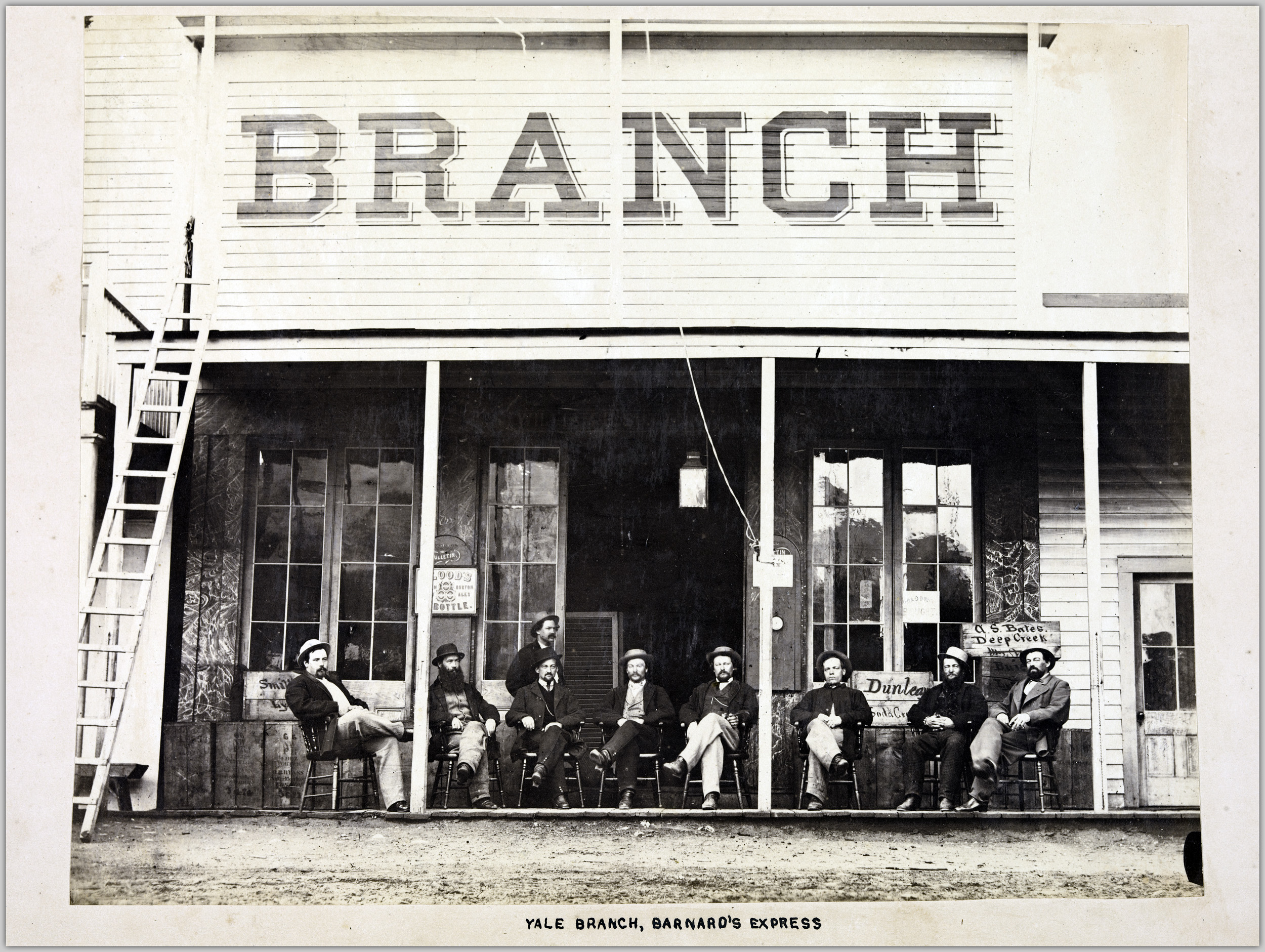
Barnard's Express, Yale. 1867–1868.

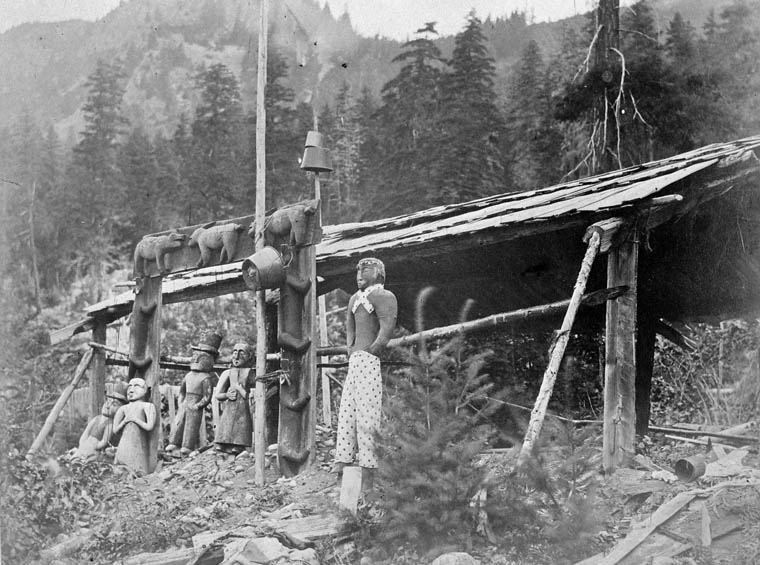
First Nations chief's grave at Chapman's Bar, Fraser River. 1867–1868.

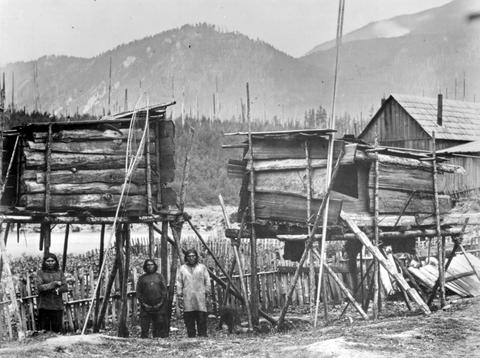
Salmon caches on the Fraser River. 1868.

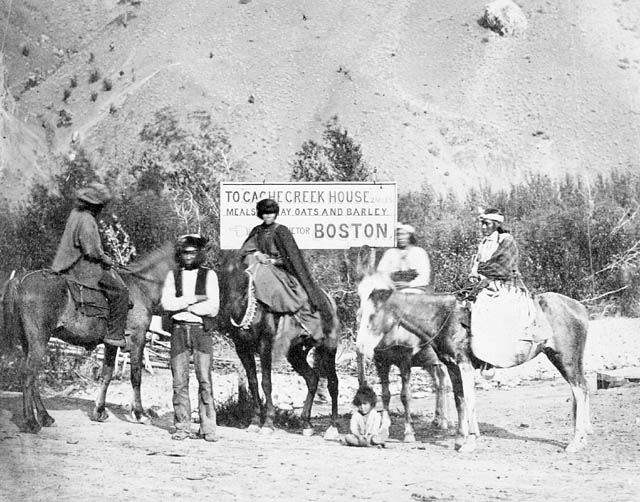
On the Cariboo Road. 1867–1868.

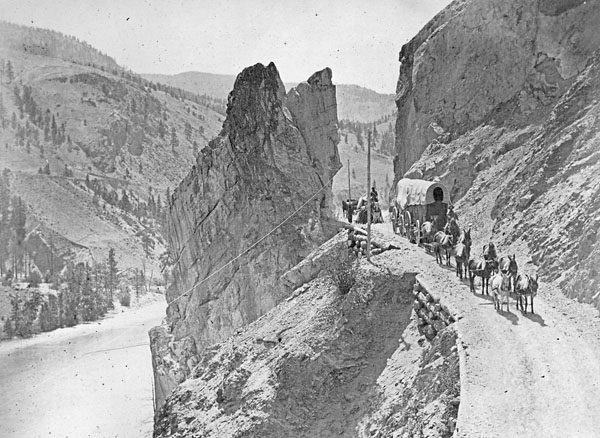
Freight wagons along the Thompson River, 1867–1868.

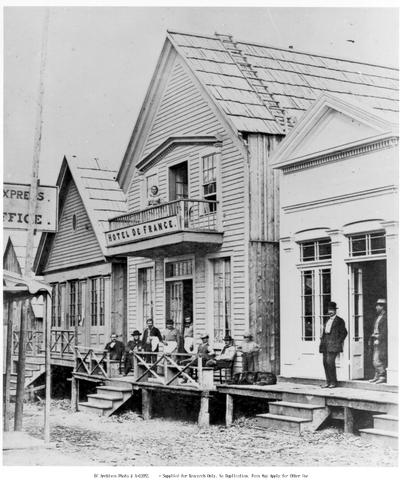
Barkerville's Hotel de France. 1867–1868.

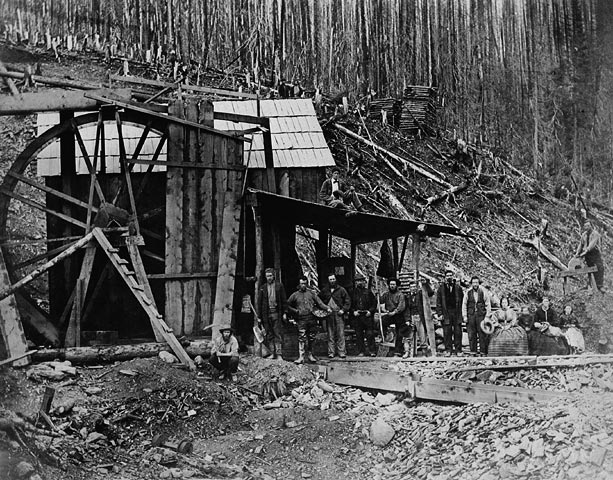
Alturas Gold Mining Company, Stout's Gulch, Lowhee Creek. 1867–1868.

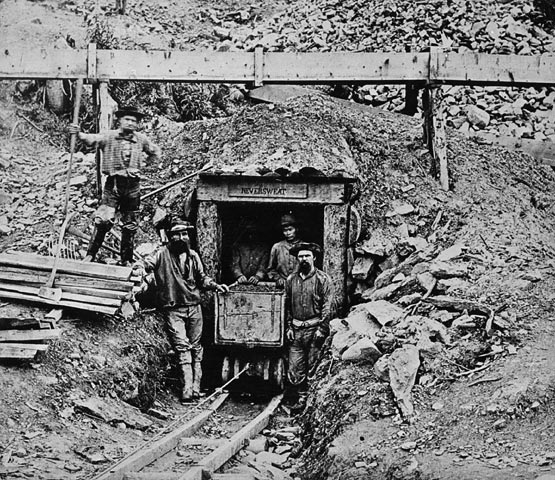
The Never-Sweat Company tunnel, Williams Creek. 1867–1868.

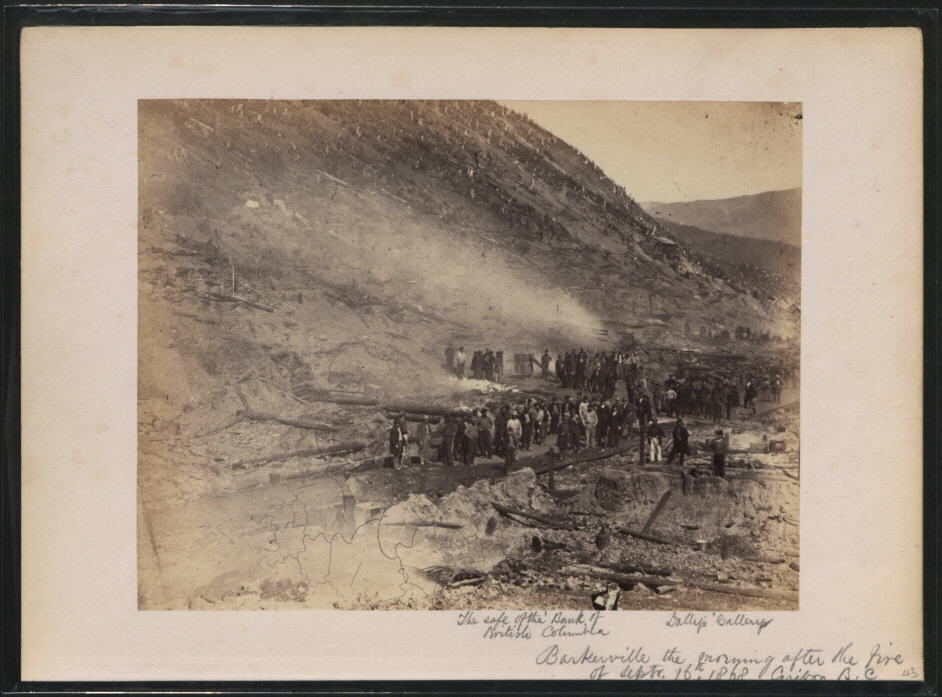
Barkerville after the great fire. September 17, 1868.

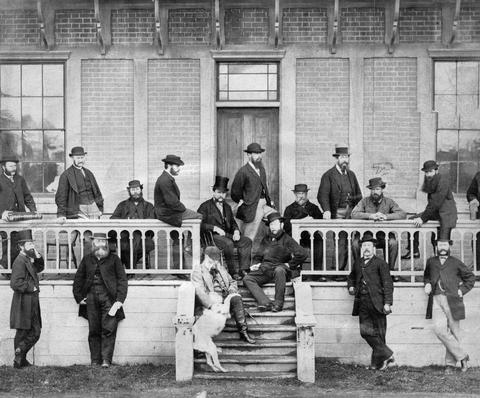
Members of the First Legislature after the Union of the Two Colonies, in front of The Birdcages, Victoria. 1870.

== Sources ==
- Blackman, Margaret (1986). "Studio Indians: Cartes de visite of Native People in British Columbia, 1862–1872". Archivaria. 21: 68–86.
- Greenhill, Ralph (1965). Early Photography in Canada. Toronto: Oxford University Press.
- Mattison, David; Savard, Daniel (1992). "The North-west Pacific Coast: Photographic Voyages 1866–81". History of Photography. 16: 268–288. doi:10.1080/03087298.1992.10442558.
- Roy-Sole, Monique (2008). "Edge of the Empire". Canadian Geographic. 128: 58–66.
- Savard, Daniel (2000). "The Viewfinder: The Collectible Cabinet Card". Discovery. 27. Royal British Columbia Museum: 7.
- Savard, Daniel (2010). Images from the Likeness House. Victoria: Royal British Columbia Museum. ISBN 978-0-7726-6150-0.
- Thomas, Alan (1982). "Photography of the Indian: Concept and Practice on the Northwest Coast". BC Studies. 52: 61–85.
- Waite, Donald E. (2015). British Columbia and Yukon Gold Hunters: A History in Photographs. Victoria: Heritage House Publishing. ISBN 978-1772030778.
