= Claudet =

Claudet may refer to:

== Surname ==
- Antoine Claudet (1797–1867) French photographer
- Frances Claudet (1911–2001) Canadian skater
- Francis George Claudet (1837–1906) Assayer for the Royal Mint in British Columbia
- Max Claudet (1840–1893) French sculptor

== Movie ==
- The Sin of Madelon Claudet
