= Francis George Claudet =

19th-century English photographer

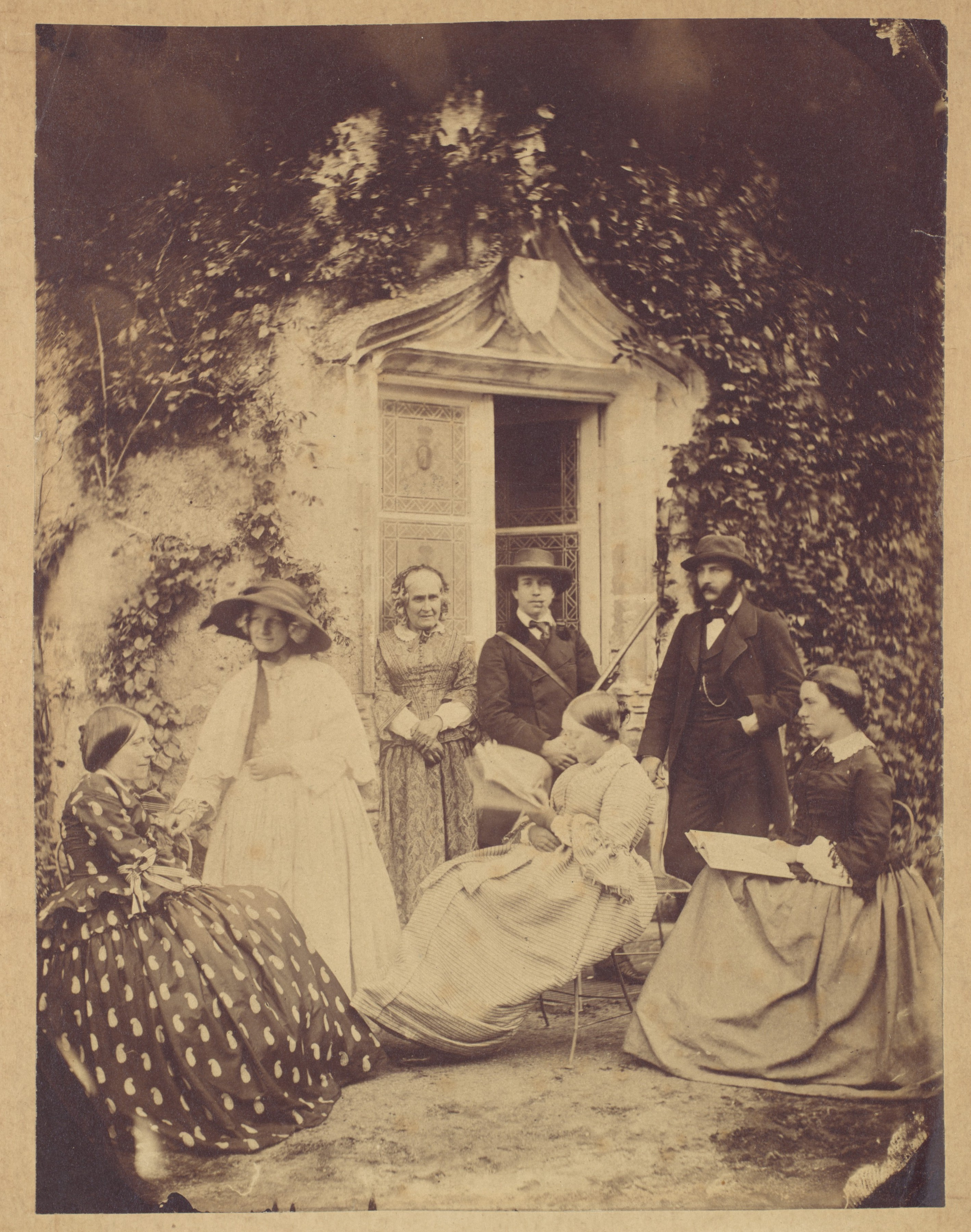
- Claut (second from right) in 1856
- Born: 15 June 1837. London
- Died: 13 March 1906 (aged 68); Kilburn, London
- Resting place: Highgate Cemetery
- Occupations: Assayer and amateur photographer

Francis George Claudet (1837-1906) was an assayer for the Royal Mint in British Columbia, Canada, photographer and the youngest son of Antoine François Jean Claudet, the French photographer-inventor who produced daguerreotypes.

== Career ==
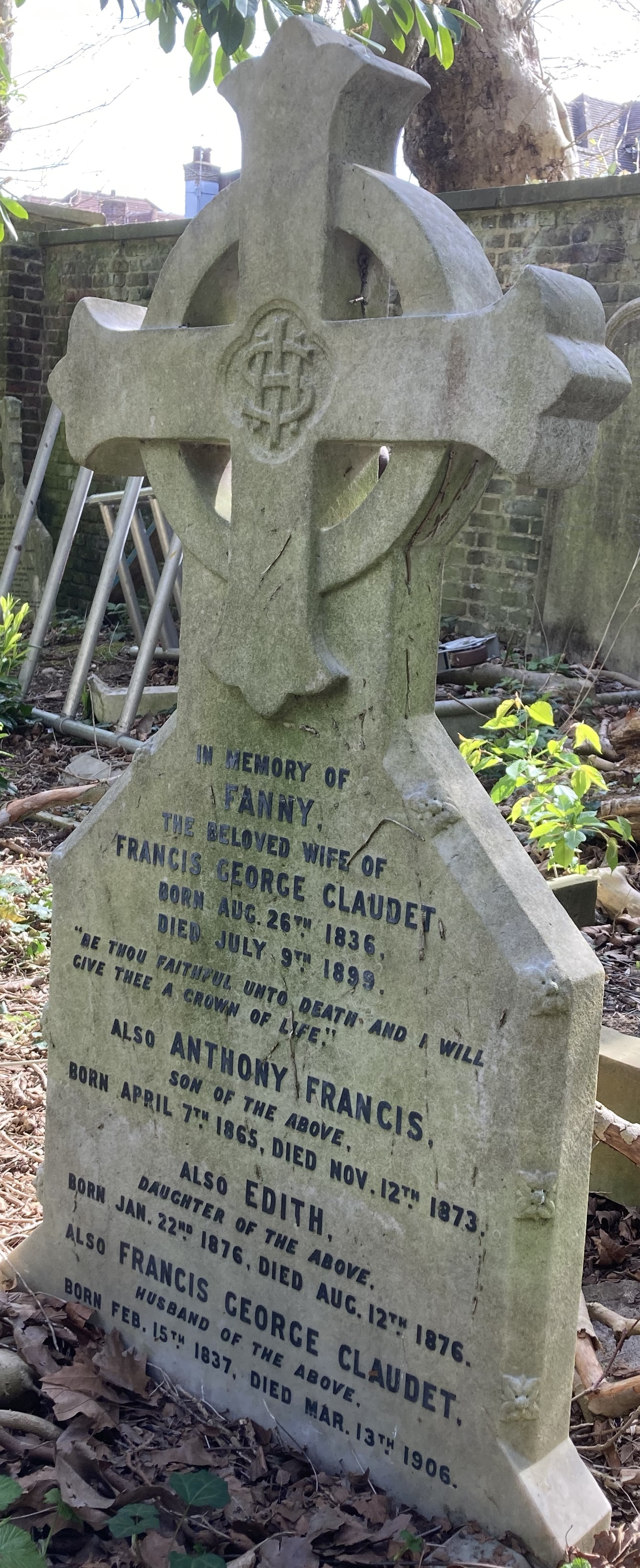
Family grave of Francis George Claudet in Highgate Cemetery

Francis Claudet was born on 15 February 1837 in Islington, London, the youngest of eight children of Antoine and Julia Claudet. In 1859 the Royal Mint appointed him as the Assayer for the Colony of British Columbia, Canada. Initially he lived in Victoria, Vancouver Island travelling widely in both British Columbia and Vancouver, including aboard HMS Satellite, the ship on which Lieutenant Richard "Arctic" Roche served. Claudet lived in New Westminster over the next thirteen years, working in various civil service roles before returning to England with his family and taking a position in Runcorn, Cheshire as a chemical engineer managing a copper works. Around 1890 he returned to London with his wife Fanny and three of their six children, living first in Camberwell, before moving to their final home in Kilburn.

== Photography ==
Claudet inherited an interest in photography from his father and took images of New Westminster and its residents, as well as subjects he encountered on official duties. He knew other professional photographers, including Frederick Dally in Victoria, David Withrow in New Westminster & Moodyville, and possibly Richard and Hannah Maynard, whom he is likely to have met in 1862 on board a steamer from San Francisco. He does not appear to have pursued his interest in photography, as there is no record of him exhibiting any photographs after returning to England.

In 1946 one of his sons, who had emigrated to Canada, sold some family papers, including photograph albums, to the British Columbia Archives.

== Death ==
Claudet died at his home, 181 Willesden Lane, Kilburn, London on 13 March 1906 and is buried in a family grave on the west side of Highgate Cemetery.
