= Lawrence & Holloman =

2013 Canadian film directed by Matthew Kowalchuk

- Film poster
- Directed by: Matthew Kowalchuk
- Written by: Matthew Kowalchuk; Daniel Arnold
- Based on: Lawrence & Holloman by Morris Panych
- Produced by: Paul Armstrong; Daniel Arnold; Matthew Kowalchuk
- Starring: Daniel Arnold; Ben Cotton; Katharine Isabelle; Amy Matysio
- Cinematography: Graham Talbot; Nelson Talbot
- Edited by: David Legault
- Music by: Don MacDonald
- Production companies: Ameland Films; Lawrence & Holloman Productions; Quadrant Motion Pictures
- Distributed by: Search Engine Films
- Release date: October 1, 2013 (VIFF)
- Running time: 88 minutes
- Country: Canada
- Language: English

Lawrence & Holloman is a Canadian black comedy film, directed by Matthew Kowalchuk and released in 2013. Adapted from the theatrical play of the same name by Morris Panych, the film stars Daniel Arnold as Holloman, an unhappy and pessimistic department store credit collector who is preparing to commit suicide when he meets brash salesman Lawrence (Ben Cotton), only for Lawrence to begin experiencing a string of bad luck that tests his eternal optimism.

The cast also includes Katharine Isabelle, Amy Matysio, Josh Epstein, Kyle Rideout, Medina Hahn and Christine Willes.

The film premiered at the 2013 Vancouver International Film Festival, where Kowalchuk won the award for Best BC Emerging Filmmaker, before going into commercial release in 2014.

== Critical response ==
Christine Ziemba of Paste negatively reviewed the film, writing that "Lawrence & Holloman strives for a mixture of the classic odd-coupling Planes, Trains and Automobiles (sadly without as much heart or dynamic performances exemplified by John Candy and Steve Martin) and Waiting for Godot. The existential component derives from the script’s source material—a two-hander stage play by Morris Panych—with Arnold and Kowalchuk developing and embellishing grisly scenes that occur offstage in the play for the film version. And, aside from a few daydream/fantasy sequences, Lawrence & Holloman still retains an air of theatricality, which tonally doesn’t translate well to the screen. The questions the film posits about fate and destiny and whether they can be changed by disposition are intriguing, but the one-note nature of the leading characters distracts from any subtler, and therefore more rewarding, character development. Mostly played at full tilt, Lawrence’s unbridled optimism comes off as more cloying than comical, and Holloman’s transformation from suicidal collection agent to sadist is unconvincing."

Janet Smith of The Georgia Straight was more positive, writing that "Like the play, the film is less about what happens—not a lot once the role reversal shifts into gear—and more about questions like: is our happiness directly related to our outlook on life? And more importantly, are stupid people happier? In the final act, the film goes truly dark, getting its closest to creating Panych’s stylized, existential world—one more akin to that of Rosencrantz and Guildenstern Are Dead than to the rest of the movie’s deadpan Office Space vibe. For those who like their comedy served nihilistically black, this is where they’ll reap the biggest rewards. For those who prefer to keep on the sunny side? Maybe spend your summer day elsewhere."

== Awards ==
The film won the Canadian Comedy Award for Best Feature Film at the 15th Canadian Comedy Awards in 2014. The film was also nominated for Best Direction in a Feature (Kowalchuk), Best Writing in a Feature (Kowalchuk, Arnold) and Best Male Performance in a Feature (Cotton).

It received nine Leo Award nominations in 2014, including Best Film, Best Actor (2: Cotton, Arnold), Best Supporting Actress (Isabelle), Best Direction, Best Screenwriting, Best Picture Editing, Best Sound Editing and Best Casting.
