= Janet Munsil =

Canadian playwright

Janet Munsil is a Canadian playwright based in Victoria, British Columbia. She is most noted for her plays That Elusive Spark and Be Still. Munsil is also a theatre director and has served as artistic director of Intrepid Theatre and the Victoria Fringe Festival.

== Early life and education ==
Munsil was born in Seattle and raised in Port Alberni on Vancouver Island. She completed a BFA at the University of Victoria in 1980. She would go on to complete an MFA there in 2019.

== Career ==
Munsil's play That Elusive Spark was a Governor General's Literary Award nominee for English-language drama at the 2014 Governor General's Awards. Her play Be Still was adapted by Elizabeth Lazebnik into the 2021 film Be Still. Her other plays have included Emphysema (A Love Story), Circus Fire, Influence, I Have Seen Beautiful Jim Key, Sveva, Act of Faith, The Ugly Duchess, and a stage adaptation of Pride and Prejudice. Act of Faith is a mixed-ability play.

She was formerly the artistic director of Victoria's Intrepid Theatre and the Victoria Fringe Festival, until leaving these roles in 2016. Munsil is also a theatre director. Her directorial credits include Twelfth Night with the Greater Victoria Shakespeare Festival in 2016, Born Yesterday with Blue Bridge Repertory Theatre in 2017, and the Canadian College of Performing Arts' 2019 production of Goodnight Desdemona (Good Morning Juliet).
