= Patricia Bethune =

American film and television actress

- Born: Patricia Anne Bethune; U.S.
- Other name: P.B. Hutton
- Occupation: Actress
- Years active: 1995–present

Patricia Bethune, sometimes credited as P.B. Hutton, is an American television actress.

== Career ==
In 2019, she received Daytime Emmy Award for Outstanding Special Guest Performer in a Drama Series at the 46th Daytime Emmy Awards for her recurring performance as evil Nurse Mary Pat on the ABC daytime soap opera, General Hospital.

Bethune has appeared in a more than 50 television shows, include Seinfeld, CSI: Crime Scene Investigation, Everybody Loves Raymond, Malcolm in the Middle, Desperate Housewives, Mad Men and How to Get Away with Murder. From 2008 to 2014, she had a recurring role as Jane Bodehouse in the HBO horror drama series, True Blood. She also had recurring roles on The Norm Show, Longmire and Grey's Anatomy.

Bethune also appeared in a number of films, including The Lost World: Jurassic Park (1997), Species III (2004), Beyond the Reach (2014) and The Open House (2018).

== Acting Credits ==
=== Film ===
Year	Title	Role	Notes
1997	The Lost World: Jurassic Park	Screamer	credited as P.B. Hutton
2007	Out of Omaha	Meg	Documentary Film
2012	Metamorphosis	Beverly Serling	Short Film
2014	Beyond the Reach	Secretary	
2016	ToY	Janice Greenberg	Independent Film
2018	The Open House	Martha	

=== Television ===
Year	Title	Role	Notes	Credit
1995	Maybe This Time	Maryanne	Episode: "Julia's Day Off"	credited as P.B. Hutton
1995	Seinfeld	Walker #3	Episode: "The Sponge"	credited as P.B. Hutton
1996	Family Matters	Optimistic Ticket Agent	Episode: "Eau de Love"	credited as P.B. Hutton
1996	Grace Under Fire	Woman	Episode: "Mr. Mullens' Opus"	credited as P.B. Hutton
1997	3rd Rock from the Sun	Teacher	Episode: "Same Old Song and Dick"	credited as P.B. Hutton
1997	Murphy Brown	Museum Goer #2	Episode: "Hero Today, Gone Tomorrow"	credited as P.B. Hutton
1997	Michael Hayes	Bailiff	Episode: "Act of Contrition"	
1997	Buffy the Vampire Slayer	Mrs. Kalish	Episode: "What's My Line? Part 1"	credited as P.B. Hutton
1997	Beverly Hills, 90210	Bad Comic #2	Episode: "Comic Relief"	credited as P.B. Hutton
1998	Brooklyn South	Waitress	Episode: "Dead Man Sleeping"	credited as P.B. Hutton
1998	Arliss	Sara	Episode: "The Working Man's Friend"	credited as P.B. Hutton
1998	Kenan & Kel	Actress	Episode: "You Dirty Rat"	credited as P.B. Hutton
1998	Everybody Loves Raymond	Exchange Lady	Episode: "The Toaster"	credited as P.B. Hutton
1999-2001	The Norm Show	Mary	3 episodes	credited as P.B. Hutton
1999	Dr. Quinn Medicine Woman: The Movie	Darlene Slopes	Television Film	credited as P.B. Hutton
1999	Chicken Soup for the Soul	Actress	Episode: "Nobody Knows the Difference"	credited as P.B. Hutton
2000	Jack & Jill	Street Fair Vendor	Episode: "When You Wish Upon a Car"	credited as P.B. Hutton
2000	Judging Amy	DCF Megan Brock	Episode: "Human Touch"	credited as P.B. Hutton
2000	G vs E	Mother	Episode: "Ambulance Chaser"	credited as P.B. Hutton
2001	Philly	Lorraine	Episode: "Loving Sons"	credited as P.B. Hutton
2002	Angel	Female Elderly Demon	Episode: "Double or Nothing"	credited as P.B. Hutton
2002	Family Affair	Secretary	Episode: "French Lessons"	credited as P.B. Hutton
2003	Malcolm in the Middle	Mrs. Tracy	Episode: "If Boys Were Girls"	credited as P.B. Hutton
2003	The Guardian	Mrs. Webber	Episode: "Back in the Ring"	credited as P.B. Hutton
2003	Gilmore Girls	Terry	Episode: "Keg! Max!"	credited as P.B. Hutton
2003-2005	CSI: Crime Scene Investigation	Teacher	Episode: "Lady Heather's Box" and "4x4"	
2003-2005	CSI: Crime Scene Investigation	Wilma Shaw	Episode: "4x4"	
2004	Species III	Colleen	Television Film	
2005-2018	Grey's Anatomy	Older Nurse	Episode: "If Tomorrow Never Comes"	
2005-2018	Grey's Anatomy	Ginger	6 episodes	
2005	Two and a Half Men	Mrs. Flanagan (uncredited)	Episode: "Does This Smell Funny to You"	
2005	Over There	AA Woman	Episode: "Situation Normal"	
2006	Invasion	Ellen Paymer	Episode: "The Nest"	
2006	The Suite Life of Zack and Cody	Wilhelmina	Episode: "Books and Birdhouse"	
2006	Out of Mind	Nurse Beth Mayfield	TV animated mini-series; 5 episodes	
2007	Cold Case	Dr. Penny Davoren	Episodes: "Running Around" and "Wunderkind"	
2007	Journeyman	Doctor	Episodes: "Blowback"	
2007	Boston Legal	Nan Goody	Episodes: "No Brains Left Behind"	
2007	Judy's Got a Gun	Elsbeth	Television Film	
2008-2014	True Blood	Jane Bodehouse	19 episodes	
2008	Without a Trace	Maureen Russell	Episode: "A Dollar and a Dream"	
2008	My Name is Earl	Diana	Episode: "Monkeys Taking a Bath"	
2009	Sonny with a Chance	Mrs. Montecore	Episode: "Cookie Monsters"	
2010	Desperate Housewives	Joyce	Episode: "How About a Friendly Shrink?"	
2010	Sons of Tucson	Secretary	Episode: "Pilot"	
2010	Sons of Tucson	Ginny	Episode: "Chicken Pox"	
2010	Mad Men	Dr. Edna Keener	Episodes: "They Chrysanthemum and the Sword" and "Blowing Smoke"	
2012	Mike & Molly	Patty	Episode: "Yard Sale"	
2013	Touch	Miss Herrera	Episode: "Enemy of My Enemy"	
2014-2016	Longmire	Mary Jo Murphy	3 episodes	
2015	Stalker	Hazel	Episode: "The Woods"	
2015	Married	Virginia	Episode: "The Waiter"	
2015	NCIS	Paulette Quinn	Episode: "Blood Brothers"	
2016	How to Get Away with Murder	Lorraine Huffman	Episode: "We're Good People Now"	
2017	Bosch	Mrs. Evelyn Meadows	Episode: "The Smog Cutter"	
2018	For The People	Miriam Oliver	Episode: "The Library Fountain"	
2018	General Hospital	Nurse Mary Pat	15 episodes	
2018	General Hospital	Nurse Mary Pat Ingles	Episode: "#1.14102"	
2020	Mom	Wanda	Episode: "Cheddar Cheese and a Squirrel Circus"	
2022	Mike	Marilyn Murray	Episode: "Phoenix"; TV miniseries	
2026	9-1-1	Carol	Episode: "Going Once, Going Twice"	
