= The Open House =

Open House
- Official release poster
- Directed by: Matt Angel; Suzanne Coote
- Written by: Matt Angel; Suzanne Coote
- Produced by: Dan Angel; Matt Angel; Suzanne Coote
- Starring: Dylan Minnette; Piercey Dalton; Sharif Atkins; Patricia Bethune; Aaron Abrams
- Cinematography: Filip Vandewal
- Edited by: Bradley McLaughlin
- Music by: Joseph Shirley
- Distributed by: Netflix
- Release date: January 19, 2018
- Running time: 94 minutes
- Country: United States
- Language: English

The Open House is a 2018 American horror film written and directed by Matt Angel and Suzanne Coote. After a mother and son move into a new home, they are soon besieged by threatening, unnerving forces. It stars Dylan Minnette, Piercey Dalton, Sharif Atkins, Patricia Bethune, and Aaron Abrams. Netflix released it on January 19, 2018. The film was widely panned by critics and audiences.

== Plot ==
A suburban father is killed after being hit by a car. Unemployed and financially unable to support herself and her teenage son Logan, his wife Naomi agrees to move into her sister's secluded mountain chalet until it sells. Upon moving into the beautiful home, Naomi and Logan encounter their elderly neighbor, Martha, who behaves strangely, and Chris, a pleasant but persistent store clerk.

During the open house days on Sunday, Naomi and Logan are required to leave the property at breakfast and return after 5 p.m. A series of strange occurrences begin. Objects are moved or disappear, the house phone rings but nobody speaks, the pilot to the hot water tank repeatedly gets shut off, and there are unexplained noises. One night, Logan sees a car idling in the driveway. Outside, he finds Martha, who behaves erratically. Martha later alludes to her deceased husband being alive despite previously claiming her husband was dead.

A repairman is called to inspect the faulty hot water tank. He reveals that Martha's husband really did die and Martha has Alzheimer's, leading to her confusion. Naomi is crushed when she finds a family photo crumpled up in the trash, and the repairman finds Logan's missing phone near the water heater, leading Naomi to believe that Logan has been messing with her. The two have a heated argument and he denies messing with her or destroying the photo. That night, it is revealed that an intruder is lurking in the home. One day, Naomi and Logan find that the chalet has been broken into and someone has set up a candlelit dinner on the table, but the police find nothing. Unable to afford a hotel, mother and son are forced to remain in the house.

Logan contacts Chris, who agrees to spend the night on the couch. In the middle of the night, Chris goes missing, and Logan finds him with his throat slashed in his car. The intruder knocks Logan unconscious, pours water over him and leaves him to the harsh winter elements while he goes after Naomi. Naomi is horrified to discover photos of her, and Logan, sleeping in their beds. She is then attacked, bound and has her fingers broken. Logan comes to and frees Naomi. Attempting to call 911, he finds that all phones have had their SIM cards removed. He rushes to help his mother, but mistakes her for the intruder and stabs her. Naomi tells him to run before collapsing. The intruder easily overpowers Logan and removes his contact lenses, leaving Logan unable to see clearly, before forcing him outside.

Logan escapes into the woods and hides. He survives the freezing elements until morning. Succumbing to hypothermia, he drags himself to a stream. The intruder reveals himself, grabs Logan as he struggles and screams, and strangles him to death. As Logan's lifeless body lies by the stream, the intruder drives toward the next open house event.

== Cast ==
- Dylan Minnette as Logan Wallace, Naomi’s son
- Piercey Dalton as Naomi Wallace, Logan’s mother
- Sharif Atkins as Chris
- Patricia Bethune as Martha
- Aaron Abrams as Brian Wallace, Logan's father
- Edward Olson as The Man in Black
- Kathryn Beckwith as Joannie Mcallister

== Release ==
The film was released on Netflix on January 19, 2018.

== Reception ==
The film holds an approval rating of 7% on Rotten Tomatoes based on 15 reviews and has an average rating of 3.3/10.

On The Globe and Mail, John Doyle gave the film a positive review, writing that it is "as escapism, The Open House is a good diversion, but not lacking in seriousness." In a negative review on Decider, Jade Budowski wrote that the film "could have shaken things up with a tighter script and better execution, but instead, it winds up being both tired and tedious, two sins no horror movie can survive."

On Bloody Disgusting, Dax Ebaben rated it 1.5/5 "skulls", writing that "there is a kernel of a decent, if unoriginal, idea here. However, the execution is subpar, there is hardly any build-up of tension, and there is never a decent payoff." On Forbes, Paul Tassi blamed Netflix for the poor quality of the film and added that it is "genuinely one of the worst horror movies I’ve ever seen, and I’ve seen a lot of them." He also cited the low scores the film received from audiences at the time of its release, an audience score of 14% on Rotten Tomatoes and 3.5/10 on IMDb.

WhatCulture named it #4 on its list of 20 worst movies of 2018.
