= Daniel Arnold (actor) =

Canadian actor and writer

Daniel Arnold (a.k.a. Daniel Smith Arnold) is a Canadian actor and writer based in Vancouver, British Columbia. He is most noted as cowriter with Darrell Dennis and Medina Hahn of Inheritance: a pick-the-path experience, a stage play which was shortlisted for the Governor General's Award for English-language drama at the 2022 Governor General's Awards.

== Early life ==
Born in Nelson, British Columbia, and raised in Edmonton, Alberta, he studied theatre at the University of Alberta as a classmate of Hahn, with whom he has remained closely associated as partners in the DualMinds theatre company.

== Career ==
He won two Elizabeth Sterling Haynes Awards in 2001 for Tuesdays & Sundays, as Outstanding New Work and Outstanding Actor. In 2008, when Daniel MacIvor won the Siminovitch Prize in Theatre, he selected Arnold and Hahn as the winners of the Protégé honour.

In film, he is most noted as the writer and co-star of Lawrence & Holloman, the 2013 film adaptation of Morris Panych's stage play, and for his role as Richard Maynard in the 2021 film Be Still. He received Leo Award nominations for Best Actor in a Film and Best Screenwriting for Lawrence & Holloman in 2014, and Best Actor in a Film for Be Still in 2022, and received a Canadian Comedy Award nomination for Best Writing in a Film at the 15th Canadian Comedy Awards in 2014 for Lawrence & Holloman, which also received the award for Best Feature Film.

His play Inheritance: a pick-the-path experience is a stage play about indigenous land claims which features points at which the audience can vote on the direction the story would take, requiring the actors to be prepared for at least 50 different possible permutations of the performance. It was shortlisted for the Governor General's Award for English-language drama at the 2022 Governor General's Awards. His other plays have included Tuesdays & Sundays, Any Night, and The Ridiculous Darkness.

== Filmography ==
=== Film ===
Year	Title	Role	Notes
2013	Lawrence & Holloman	Holloman	Also writer and producer
2014	Sitting on the Edge of Marlene	James	
2014	Grace: The Possession	Priest	
2015	Eadweard	Williamson	
2015	Even Lambs Have Teeth	Deputy Carson	
2015	FSM	Jim	
2019	Ash	Peter	
2021	Be Still	Richard Maynard	
2022	Dark Nature	Derek	

=== Television ===
Year	Title	Role	Notes
2006	The 4400	Alex Messina	Episode: "The Starzl Mutation"
2008	The Triple Eight	Catty Platter Guy	Episode: "Cat in a Hot Tin Box"
2008, 2009	Supernatural	Xavier / Ghostly Man	2 episodes
2010	Lies Between Friends	Deputy Ford	Television film
2011	The Killing	ADA Patrick Millikin	Episode: "I'll Let You Know When I Get There"
2011	Fringe	Agent Perez	Episode: "One Night in October"
2014	Hell on Wheels	Zeke Spinoza	Episode: "Further West"
2015	The P.I. Experiment	Nathan 'Rocket' Rockefeller	Television film
2015	Mythos	Doctor / Stalker	2 episodes
2015–present	When Calls the Heart	Jed Campbell	9 episodes
2016	Tips	Mike	Episode: "Welcome to Leftovers"
2017	When We Rise	Jake	Episode: "Night III: Parts IV and V"
2017	Zoo	Daniel Vashman	2 episodes
2018	iZombie	Angry FG Soldier	Episode: "Goon Struck"
