= Hannah Maynard =

Canadian photographer (1834–1918)

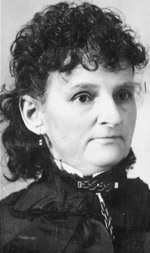
- Born: Hannah Hatherly; January 17, 1834; Bude, Cornwall, England
- Died: May 15, 1918 (aged 84); Victoria, British Columbia, Canada
- Known for: Photographer
- Spouse: Richard Maynard

Hannah Maynard (Bude, 1834 – Victoria, 1918) (née Hatherly) was a Canadian photographer best known for her portrait work and experimental photography involving photomontage and multiple exposures. Her studio also functioned as site of creative exploration, where she engaged with new photographic techniques and technologies as they emerged. Many of her photographs are self-portraits, or include her family as subjects. Over the course of nearly five decades, her studio documented a rapidly growing Victoria, producing images that ranged from formal portraits to inventive staged compositions. She also photographed people using techniques that made them appear as statuary: on columns or posing as if they were made of stone.

== Early life and career ==
She was born in 1834 as Hannah Hatherly, in Bude, Cornwall. She was raised in a middle-class household; her father worked as a master mariner, one of the highest-ranked professional seafarers of the period. Hatherly married in 1852 Richard Maynard, an apprentice boot-maker, and in the same year they emigrated to Bowmanville in Canada West (present-day Ontario), where four of their five children were born. In 1858, Richard joined the exodus of gold-seekers on the Fraser River in British Columbia, and his venture appears to have been profitable. While her husband was out west, Maynard learned the basics of photography. With no formal photographic schools available locally, she likely developed her skills through access to equipment and observing practicing photographers in the region most likely from R & H O'Hara Photographers, in Bowmanville. After selling the boot store, in 1862 the family moved to Victoria on the Colony of Vancouver Island. Richard soon left for the Stikine River to take up placer mining, and it is believed that in 1862 Hannah opened up her first photographic studio, Mrs. R. Maynard's Photographic Gallery. Profits from Richard Maynard's work in the goldfields helped provide the capital needed to establish their new enterprises in the city. Her decision to pursue photography combined creative ambition with entrepreneurial independence at a time when few women operated businesses publicly. Upon his return home in 1863, Richard found his wife successfully entrenched as a photographer, and by 1864 Hannah had taught her husband the principles of photography while he operated a second boot store.

In the ensuing years, Hannah and Richard had contrasting photographic specialties. Hannah was best known for her portrait work and at the same time managed darkroom affairs and studio promotion, while Richard focused almost exclusively on outdoor photography. From 1874 onwards, the couple operated their photographic studio and shoe store in one building. The steady flow of people moving through Victoria during the gold rush era created a constant demand for portraiture to commemorate journeys and milestones, especially surrounding the nearby goldfields. The couple frequently traveled together, in 1875 to purchase photographic equipment in San Francisco, in 1879 on a pleasure cruise around Vancouver Island, and to Banff in the late 1880s. Hannah also made a solo trip to the Queen Charlotte Islands sometime in the same decade. While they published their photographs under separate imprints, it is sometimes unclear in the case of landscape views whether Hannah or Richard was the photographer.

== Portraiture and experimental photography ==
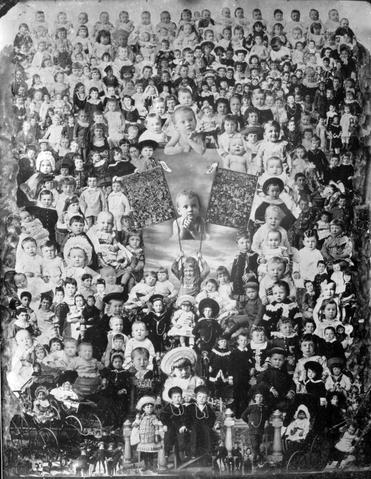
Gems of British Columbia. 1883

Maynard's portrait work encompassed several different formats following the fashions of the day, cartes-de-visite in the 1860s, cabinet cards in the following decade, as well as larger-sized prints. These small photographic calling cards were widely exchanged and helped build her reputation among a broad clientele. The Maynard studio is known to have produced forty-three cartes-de-visite of Indigenous people, often Victoria street vendors. Maynard was a master of lighting technique, and she was one of the early adopters of line-lit photography to highlight facial features. Her backgrounds were often highly ornamental, using painted backgrounds and elaborate domestic interiors and props.

Starting about 1880, Maynard began to experiment with photomontage in her Gems of British Columbia series which she created each year between 1881 and 1895. (Note: Wilks (1980) gives the last year for The Gems as 1895, Williams (2003) as 1898.) She identified professionally as a "photographic artist," emphasizing both technical skill and creative intent in her practice. Conceived as an annual greeting card to be sent out on New Years to all the mothers of children she had photographed in the preceding year, it was very popular. The series also functioned as a distinctive form of self-promotion, demonstrating her technical abilities while strengthening relationships with clients. She cut out the outline of the photograph of each baby or child, and then mounted the images on a pane of window glass and re-photographed the whole. She began to incorporate the montages of previous years in symbolist patterns, resulting in compositions that included up to 22,000 individual photographs. Her Gems of 1885 was published and praised by the St. Louis and Canadian Photographer in 1886, bringing Maynard a measure of recognition throughout North America.

Beginning in 1883 Maynard was struck by personal tragedy, with the death of her 16-year-old daughter Lillian of typhoid fever, followed in later years by another daughter Emma and daughter-in-law Adelaide, and some of her photographs began to take on the aspect of a memorial to the departed. It was also in this period that she took an interest in seances and Spiritualism. She began in the 1880s to create a type of photograph described by her as "Living Statuary" or "Statuary from Life", the sitter often appearing as a bust on a pedestal. Her experimentation developed further into the realm of multiple exposure, and some photographs show as many as four or five likenesses of Maynard, often engaged in different tasks, or in one notable image, holding a single garland of flowers. She also often included members of her close family in these photographs, such as in Hannah Maynard and her grandson, Maynard McDonald, in a tableau vivant composite photo, c.1893. A selection of her double and multiple exposure photographs were published in the St. Louis and Canadian Photographer in 1894. Another difficult technique that Maynard pursued was that of bas-relief, which involved the embossing of a photograph. Around 1897, Maynard discontinued her investigations of trick photography.

== Later years and legacy ==
Between 1897 and 1902, while continuing her studio portraiture, Maynard was the official photographer of the Victoria Police Department, producing mug shots as required as well as portraits of officers. She also photographed for the government in other capacities and worked as an ethnographic photographer. In 1907 her husband Richard died, and in 1912 she retired, selling her photographic equipment to a local Chinese photographer. She summarized her achievement by stating that "I think I can say with confidence that we photographed everyone in the town at one time or another." Throughout her career, the studio remained both a commercial enterprise and a space for sustained artistic experimentation. Maynard died in 1918 in Victoria at the age of 84. She is buried in Ross Bay Cemetery.

A play by Janet Munsil based on the life of Maynard, Be Still, premiered at Richmond's Gateway Theatre on March 1, 2001 and opened at Victoria's Belfry Theatre on March 14 of the same year. Elizabeth Lazebnik subsequently adapted the play into the film Be Still, in which Maynard was portrayed by Piercey Dalton. Lazebnik also previously made a short film about Maynard, The Multiple Selves of Hannah Maynard, in 2005. The British Columbia Archives holds the Maynard Family Collection, which includes hundreds of portraits by Hannah, Maynard's trick photography, the BC Gems series, and the Mrs. R. Maynard Photographic Studio ledgers.

In 2015, her work was included in The Artist Herself: Self-Portraits by Canadian Historical Artists, an exhibition co-curated by Alicia Boutilier and Tobi Bruce who also co-edited the book/catalogue.

== Gallery ==
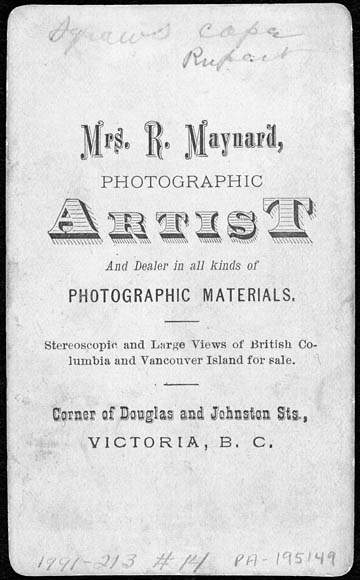
Verso of carte-de-visite showing studio logo of Hannah Maynard. ca. 1868-1878

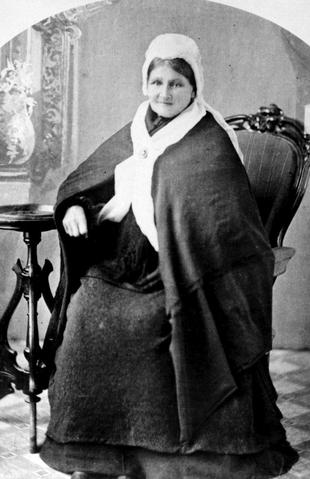
Lady Amelia Connolly Douglas. 1862 (wife of Governor James Douglas)

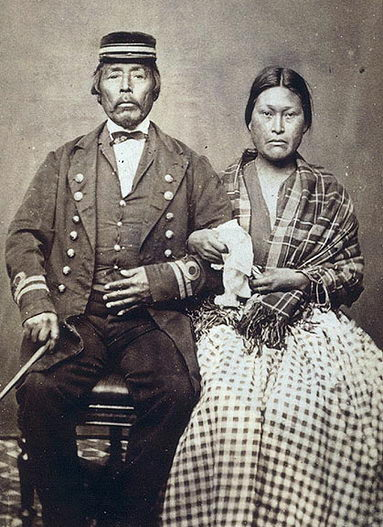
Captain Jack and his wife. c. 1868 (Kwakwakaʼwakw couple)

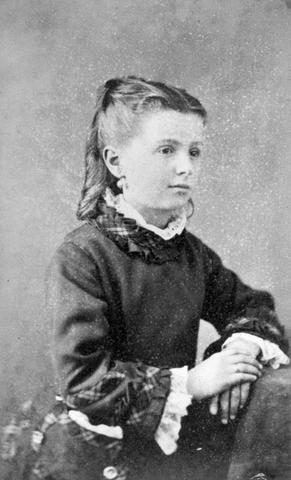
Laura Lillian Maynard. 1874

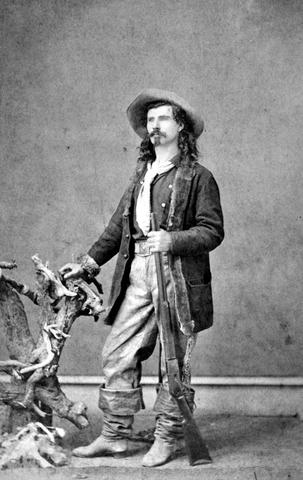
John Wallace Crawford. c. 1878

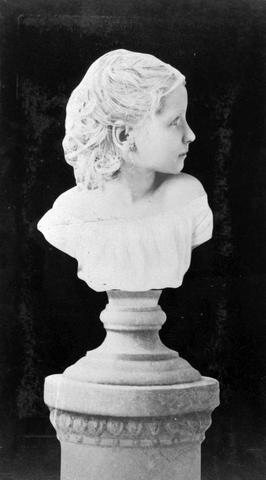
Bust of a young girl. c. 1882

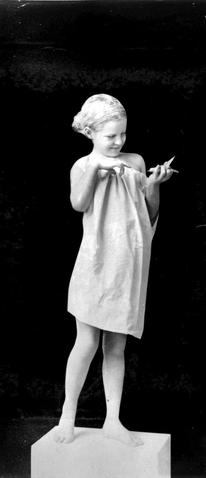
Girl holding a bird. Living Statuary series. 1884

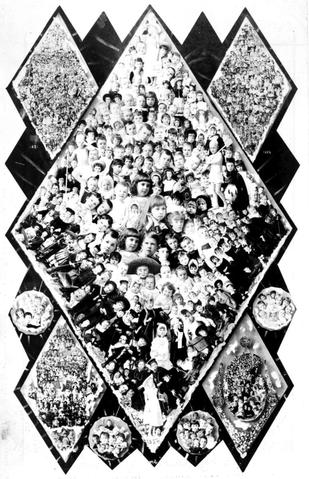
Gems of British Columbia. 1885

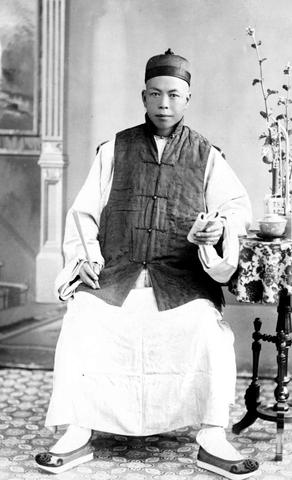
Ah Foo. c. 1885

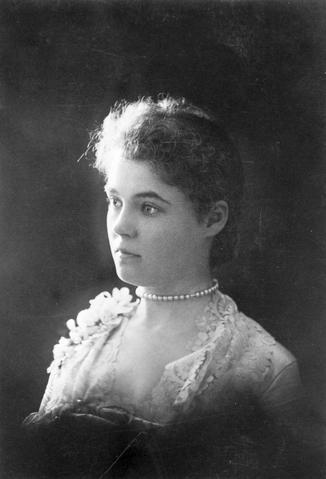
Unidentified woman. Example of line-lit photography. c. 1890

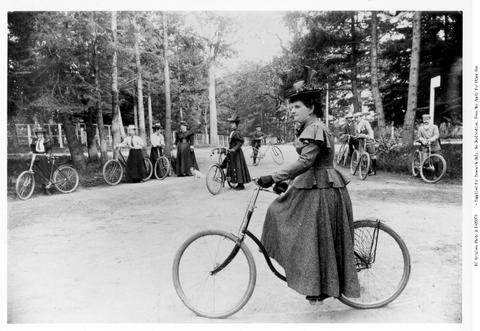
Hannah Maynard cycling. c. 1892

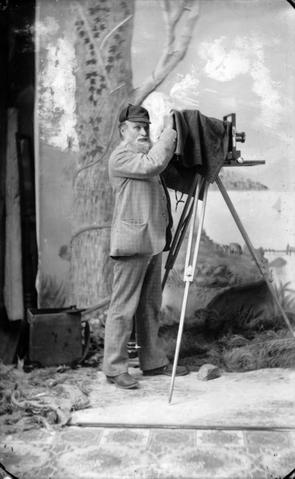
Richard Maynard. 1890s

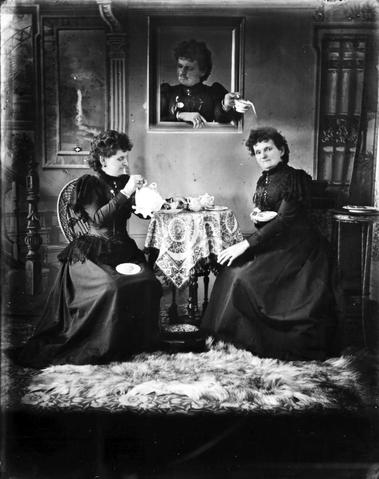
Self-portrait with multiple exposure. c. 1893

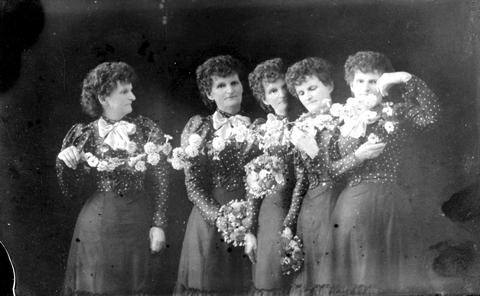
Likenesses of Hannah Maynard with garland. c. 1895

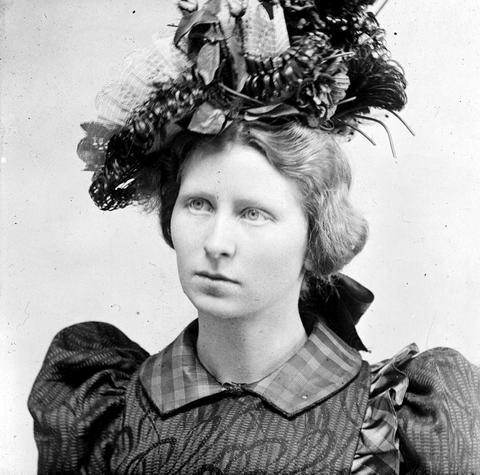
Belle Adams (Victoria Police Department photo). 1898

== Sources ==
- Palmquist, Peter E.; Kailbourn, Thomas R. (2000). Pioneer Photographers of the Far West: A Biographical Dictionary 1840–1865. Stanford, California: Stanford University Press. ISBN 0-8047-3883-1.
- Watson, Petra Rigby (June 1992). The Photographs of Hannah Maynard: 19th Century Portraits (exhibition catalogue). Charles H. Scott Gallery, Emily Carr College of Art & Design.
- Wilks, Claire Weissman (1980). The Magic Box: The Eccentric Genius of Hannah Maynard. Toronto: Exile Editions Limited. ISBN 0-920428-34-7.
- Williams, Carol J. (2003). Framing the West: Race, Gender, and the Photographic Frontier in the Pacific Northwest. New York: Oxford University Press. ISBN 0-19-514630-1.
