= Be Still (film) =

- Directed by: Elizabeth Lazebnik
- Written by: Elizabeth Lazebnik; Sophie Jarvis; Keely O'Brien
- Based on: Be Still by Janet Munsil
- Produced by: Sara Blake
- Starring: Piercey Dalton; Daniel Arnold
- Cinematography: Suzanne Friesen
- Edited by: Joshua Hemming
- Music by: Joshua Hemming
- Production company: Ceroma Films
- Release date: October 6, 2021 (VIFF)
- Running time: 83 minutes
- Country: Canada
- Language: English

Be Still is a Canadian drama film, directed by Elizabeth Lazebnik and released in 2021. An adaptation of Janet Munsil's theatrical play of the same name, the film is a biographical portrait of Hannah Maynard, a photographer from Victoria, British Columbia who was an unheralded innovator in the artistic genre of surrealism.

The film stars Piercey Dalton as Maynard and Daniel Arnold as her husband Richard, with its supporting cast including James McDougall, Amber Taylor, Meredith Hama-Brown, Sophie Merasty, Anja Savcic, Cameron Grierson, Brendan Taylor, Dakota Guppy and Ariel Ladret.

The film premiered at the 2021 Vancouver International Film Festival.

The film received two Vancouver Film Critics Circle nominations at the Vancouver Film Critics Circle Awards 2021, for Best British Columbia Film and Best Actress in a Canadian Film (Dalton). Lazebnik was also nominated for the One to Watch award.
