= Piercey Dalton =

Canadian-American actress

Piercey Dalton is a Canadian-American actress. She is most noted for her performance as Hannah Maynard in the 2021 film Be Still, for which she was a Vancouver Film Critics Circle nominee for Best Actress in a Canadian Film at the Vancouver Film Critics Circle Awards 2021.

Prior to Be Still, Dalton was best known for her role as Naomi in the 2018 horror film The Open House.

== Filmography ==
=== Film ===
Year	Title	Role	Notes
2016	The Orchard	Aunt May	
2018	The Open House	Naomi Wallace	
2018	Duke	Brenda Peters	Short film
2021	Be Still	Hannah Maynard	

=== Television ===
Year	Title	Role	Notes
2013	Untold Stories of the E.R.	Susan	Episode: "What's Wrong with This Nurse?"
2019	Bull	Tara Newton	Episode: "Pillar of Salt"
2020	Interrogation	Louise Lynch	3 episodes
