= Darrell Dennis =

Canadian actor

- Born: c. 1973 (age 52–53); Shuswap Indian Reserve, British Columbia, Canada
- Occupations: Comedian, Actor, Screenwriter & Radio personality.
- Spouse: Katya Gardner

Darrell Dennis is an Indigenous Canadian comedian, actor, screenwriter and radio personality from the Secwepemc Nation in the interior of British Columbia.

== Career ==
Dennis's acting career began at the age of 17 when he walked into his first professional audition and landed the lead role of Brian Potter on the hit CBC drama Northwood. Since then, he has been a series regular in various Canadian television series including The Rez, Open Heart, and as the host of Bingo and a Movie. He has guest starred in numerous film and television roles including Leaving Normal, the hit series Degrassi, and as Shania Twain's lover in Shania: A Life in Eight Albums.

He has been a prolific actor in the Native American theater scene but has also enjoyed mainstream success in classic theater roles such as Shaw's Arms and the Man, Strindberg's Miss Julie, Pinter's Betrayal and Lewis Carroll's Alice Through the Looking-Glass at the National Arts Centre.

In 1998, his comedy career began when he received a scholarship to train at the world-famous Second City. Two years later he joined the Second City National Touring Company and was the first ever Indigenous cast member to be hired by any of the Second City companies. He then co- founded the all- First Nations comedy troupe "Tonto's Nephews" which toured North America. In 2014, he co-founded the Los Angeles-based all Native American comedy troupe The Mayflower Welcoming Committee.

Dennis has performed stand-up comedy at televised gala performances for the Winnipeg Comedy Festival and the Just For Laughs Festival as well as numerous appearances on CBC radio and CBC Television. He was the comedic Native voice on the CBC Radio election series "Spin Off" and the T.V. special "The American Empire".

In addition to acting and comedy, he is a writer whose works have been published by Playwrights Canada Press and Douglas & McIntyre Publishing. His short stories have been published in periodicals across Canada and the U.S. His first play, "Trickster of Third Avenue East," was produced by Native Earth Performing Arts, which twice named him their "Writer-in- Residence".

On APTN, he was the head comedy writer on the talk/variety show, "Buffalo Tracks" and went on to host the APTN hit "Bingo and a Movie." In 2003, his script Moccasin Flats was an official selection at the Sundance Film Festival. The short film was later transformed into a television series that aired on the Showcase Network and APTN, and which he also wrote for.

His semi-autobiographical one-man play, "Tales of an Urban Indian", in which he explored themes of growing up as an Indigenous First Nations Native American, was nominated for two Dora Awards (Best Original Play and Best Performance by an actor) and has been produced for multiple tours across Canada and the United States, including a French translation that was performed in Montreal. He also gave a special performance of "Tales" at The Autry Theater in Los Angeles and the legendary Public Theater in New York in March 2009.

In 2009, Tales of an Urban Indian was performed by him on a city bus driving on the streets of Barrie, Ontario. A second run of performances in Barrie took place in early 2011 in preparation for taking the show on the road to other cities.

His feature film adaptation of "Tales of an Urban Indian" was accepted as one of 13 international screenplays to be accepted to the prestigious Sundance Screenwriters Lab. A television pilot based on his one-man show "Tales of an Urban Indian" was also produced by APTN and aired in 2009.

In the summers of 2008, 2009, 2010, and 2011 he produced and hosted the CBC Radio One radio documentary series, ReVision Quest, which explored and challenged the various stereotypes about North American Indigenous peoples. The show ran for four seasons and won the prestigious New York Festival Award.

In 2014, he became a series regular on the Teen Nick series Open Heart playing Detective Goodis. Also in 2014, he released his book Peace Pipe Dreams: The Truth About Lies About Indians published by Douglas and Macintyre Publishing.

In 2020, Dennis collaborated with Daniel Arnold and Medina Hahn on Inheritance: a pick-the-path experience, a stage play about indigenous land claims which featured points at which the audience could vote on the direction the story would take, requiring the actors to be prepared for at least 50 different possible permutations of the performance. The play was shortlisted for the Governor General's Award for English-language drama at the 2022 Governor General's Awards.

In 2024, he made his debut as a filmmaker with the comedy film The Great Salish Heist, and followed up in 2025 with Sweet Summer Pow Wow.

== Personal life ==
Dennis is a member of the Shuswap Nation in British Columbia. He is married to actress Katya Gardner.
