= Medina Hahn =

Canadian actress and writer

Medina Hahn is a Canadian actress and writer based in Vancouver, British Columbia. She is most noted as cowriter with Darrell Dennis and Daniel Arnold of Inheritance: a pick-the-path experience, a stage play which was shortlisted for the Governor General's Award for English-language drama at the 2022 Governor General's Awards. Inheritance: a pick-the-path experience is a stage play about indigenous land claims which features points at which the audience can vote on the direction the story would take, requiring the actors to be prepared for at least 50 different possible permutations of the performance.

She studied theatre at the University of Alberta as a classmate of Arnold, with whom she has remained closely associated as partners in the DualMinds theatre company. Their other plays have included Tuesdays & Sundays, Any Night, The Annie Logo and Bill Board Show and Clear Sunny Day.

She won two Elizabeth Sterling Haynes Awards in 2001 for Tuesdays & Sundays, as Outstanding New Work and Outstanding Actress. In 2008, when Daniel MacIvor won the Siminovitch Prize in Theatre, he selected Arnold and Hahn as the winners of the Protégé honour.
