= Lowhee Creek =

Coordinates: 53°05′47″N 121°34′50″W

Lowhee Creek is located in the Cariboo region of British Columbia. It was discovered in 1861 by American gold prospector Richard Willoughby who made a fortune in gold mining on the creek in 1861, drawing out 3,037 ounces of gold in a single season. He named it after a secret society he helped found at Yale University. The creek was mined for gold and was productive in the 1860s. The richest ground was where the stream flows into the meadows. This creek has been worked using sluicing, drifting, and hydraulicking. Hydraulicking began in the 1890s under the Cariboo Consolidated Mining Company, with their claim being regarded as the best-equipped hydraulic mine in the Cariboo region in the 1930s. Lowhee Creek was one of the highest producers of placer gold in the Barkerville area, with recorded production of 2,302,084 grams of gold between 1874 and 1945.

Lowhee Creek presents a flooding threat to nearby Wells, British Columbia. The district of Wells received millions of dollars in funding from the provincial government in 2024 to mitigate the threat of flood damage to the region.

== Contamination ==
Arsenic dating back to the mining boom in the late 1800s has been found in the sediment in Lowhee Creek.

Bonanza Ledge Mine (operated by Barkerville Gold Mines Ltd) was fined $200,000 for dumping effluent into Lowhee Creek in 2017. The mine was fined a further $276,360 in 2024 for over 1,000 incidents of contaminants being discharged into Lowhee Creek between 2017 and 2022.
