= Intrepid Theatre =

Intrepid Theatre is a not-for-profit organization in Victoria, British Columbia, Canada, that produces the annual Victoria Fringe Theatre Festival, Uno Fest: Canada’s Singular Live Theatre Event, and a year-round series of international theatre presentations and premieres for local independent theatre companies. Their mandate is to enhance the experience of live theatre in Victoria. Intrepid Theatre also created the Metro Studio and Intrepid Theatre Club – two small downtown Victoria theatre venues.

== Uno Fest ==
Uno Fest: Canada’s Singular Live Theatre Event is an annual solo performance festival held in May–June in Victoria BC. It is Canada's oldest festival dedicated to one-person shows and has been running for 12 years. In past years, this juried festival has featured a variety of solo performers from around the world, including cult internet star Chris Leavins, Toronto comic Nile Séguin, Dora Award-winner Anusree Roy, Julia Mackey, Charles Ross, and TJ Dawe.

== Victoria Fringe Theatre Festival ==
The Victoria Fringe is an international unjuried festival that is part of a circuit of Fringe Festivals in Canada. It is a founding member of the Canadian Association of Fringe Festivals (CAFF) and operates under CAFF’s four principles:

- Unjuried participation for artists
- No censorship
- 100% of the box office is returned the artist
- Accessibility to all artists and audiences.

Intrepid Theatre has produced the Victoria Fringe for 26 years. In 2009, the festival featured 54 dance, spoken word, cabaret, comedy and music performers from around the world at 13 downtown Victoria venues. The festival posted record attendance that year, with a big jump in ticket sales.
