= Richard Maynard (photographer) =

Canadian photographer

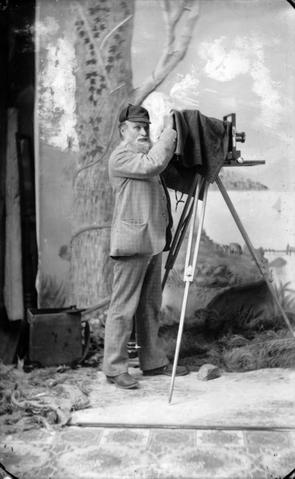
- Richard Maynard in the 1890s
- Born: February 22, 1832; Stratton, Cornwall, England
- Died: January 10, 1907 (aged 74); Victoria, British Columbia, Canada
- Known for: Photographer
- Spouse: Hannah Maynard

Richard Maynard (1832–1907) was a Canadian photographer known mainly for his landscape views taken throughout British Columbia, along coastal Alaska and on the Pribiloff Islands of the Bering Sea.

== Early life ==
He was born in Stratton, Cornwall, on February 22, 1832. When he was two years old, his family moved to the nearby town of Bude. As a boy he first went to sea, working the coastal trade between England and Wales. Maynard was also apprenticed early on to learn the shoemaker's trade, and so he made boots in the winter and worked as a sailor in the summer. In 1852 he met and married Hannah Hatherly. The couple soon emigrated to Canada, settling in Bowmanville, now part of Ontario. In June 1859, he left to join the Fraser River Gold Rush in British Columbia where he apparently had some success mining. In the interim, his wife studied the principles of photography, probably acquiring the knowledge from a local firm of photographers. Maynard returned to Bowmanville, and in 1862 the family with their four children moved permanently west to the city of Victoria on the Colony of Vancouver Island. Shortly after arriving he left for the Stickeen Territories to once again try his hand at placer mining, and by 1864 he was back in Victoria. During his absence, Hannah had started her own photography business, and upon his return Richard set up a bootmaking shop.

== Photographic career ==
It is likely that Maynard learned the skill of photography from his wife, and his earliest known photograph is an 1864 panorama of Victoria. In 1868, he took his first long distance trip, up the Cariboo Road to the gold mining town of Barkerville, accompanied by his eleven-year-son Albert, nicknamed "The General", who kept the miners entertained with magic tricks and acrobatics. Two years later, Maynard returned alone to his hometown of Bude, and on the way back he stopped to purchase photographic supplies in New York City. In May and June 1873, he received a government commission aboard the gun boat HMS Boxer which journeyed first to New Westminster, then up the east coast of Vancouver Island, continuing past along the mainland as far north as Bella Coola. On the voyage was the first federal Superintendent of Indian Affairs for the province of British Columbia, Israel Wood Powell, and Maynard's role was to document native affairs for the official report. His photographs included the first views of free-standing totem poles among the Kwakwaka'wakw at Klinaklini River, and in Takush Harbour, he took six field portraits of villagers seated against the backdrop of a Hudson's Bay Company blanket. The next year, Maynard was again the photographer on a similar mission with the same vessel, this time on a circumnavigation of Vancouver Island. The photographic results were disappointing due to the incessant bad weather, although his most important images were taken at Yuquot on Nootka Sound.

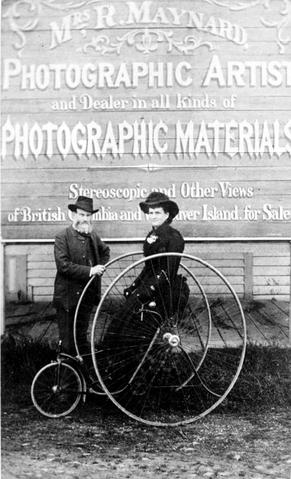
Richard and Hannah Maynard, 1880s, on a sociable.

In 1875, Richard and Hannah travelled to San Francisco to buy photographic equipment. While Richard was engaged with landscape photography, his wife managed a thriving studio business in Victoria. In June 1879, Richard made a brief trip to Alaska, photographing local sites in Wrangell such as Chief Shake's house, and also making a stop in Sitka. Two months later, Richard and Hannah went on a pleasure cruise around Vancouver Island, composing a number of views together. It is not always clear judging by the imprint which of the Maynards took any given photograph, even though some historians consider the outdoor images to be Richard's and the studio work to be Hannah's. In 1880 or 1881, Richard won a government contract to photograph the construction of the Canadian Pacific Railway between Port Moody and Eagle Pass in British Columbia. Hannah and her husband visited Emory Creek and Yale in 1880, and Richard subsequently made further trips along the railway route in the next five years. He returned to Alaska in 1882, sailing on the steamer Dakota, again photographing Wrangell and Sitka, and at the latter place he took views from Baranof's Castle. In Taku Inlet, Maynard set up his camera on an ice floe but had to be rescued by a small boat when the floe started to break up.

On another government commission in 1884, Maynard accompanied the American explorer Captain Newton Chittenden on an expedition to Haida Gwaii, then called the Queen Charlotte Islands. He took about 200 pictures on this trip, and most of the images are of villages, totem poles, and canoes, but notable exceptions were the interior of two Haida houses, the earliest such photographs known. In addition, he documented the eulachon fishery at the mouth of the Nass River on the adjacent mainland. Some engravings based on his photographs were published in Chittenden's report, released in November 1884. On July 4, 1886, he photographed the first passenger train to reach the Pacific coast at Port Moody. In April 1887, he took views of Vancouver, which had almost been totally destroyed by fire the previous year. During the following two months, Richard and Hannah toured the newly opened railway line as far as Banff and Canmore, Alberta. A third solo trip to Alaska occurred in July 1887, and despite being ill for much of the voyage, he managed a handful of photographs at Sitka, Glacier Bay, and Wrangell. Richard and his wife took a cruise in 1888 on the steamer Princess Louise to Haida Gwaii, photographing a number of localities there as well as on the British Columbia mainland and Vancouver Island. In 1890, Maynard won first prize in the professional category for his local photograph of Victoria Arm, in a contest sponsored by the West Shore, a Portland, Oregon magazine. He made a two-month trip in 1892 to Saint Paul Island, part of the disputed Pribilof Islands group in the Bering Sea, to record the seal rookeries. Maynard took about 200 photographs, and several of them made their way into the official report of the international tribunal convened to resolve ownership of the islands. In 1893, he made his last excursion to the Kootenay and Arrow Lakes region of British Columbia.

== Final years and aftermath ==
In the late 1890s, Maynard concluded his career in photography, and then enjoyed several years of retirement and comfortable family life. He died on January 10, 1907, in Victoria. His wife continued working until her retirement in 1912, and she died in 1918. Many of Maynard's prints, along with some of his personal papers, were collected by the amateur ethnologist Charles Newcombe. The negatives, along with those of his wife, were donated or sold by their son Albert to the British Columbia Archives.

He was portrayed by Daniel Arnold in the 2021 film Be Still.

The British Columbia Archives holds Richard Maynard's photography collection, primarily housed within the Maynard Family fonds.

== Gallery ==
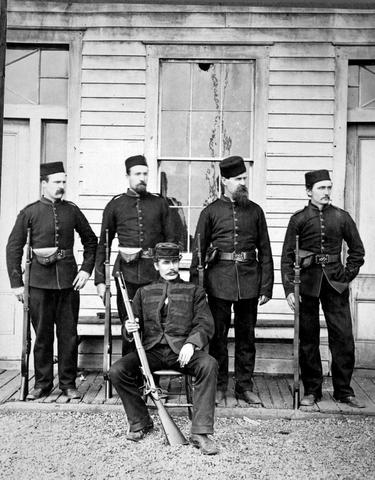
New Westminster rifle team at Clover Point, Victoria, 1865.

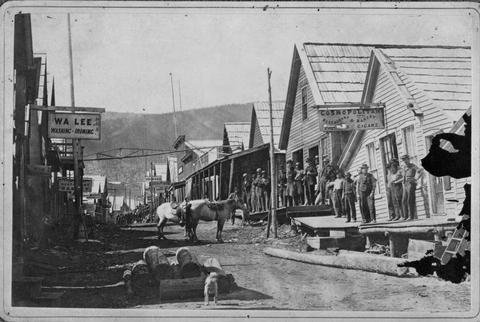
Barkerville main street, 1868.

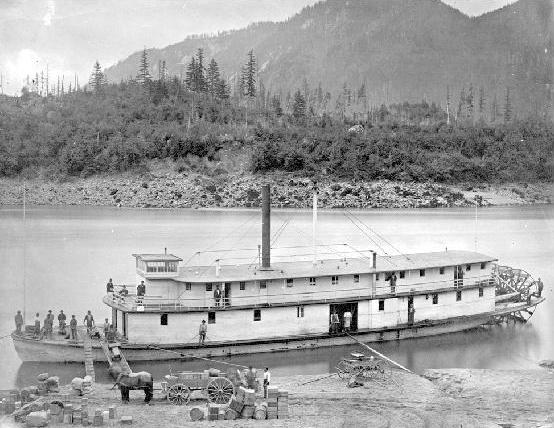
Reliance, a sternwheeler at Yale on the Fraser River, c. 1880s.

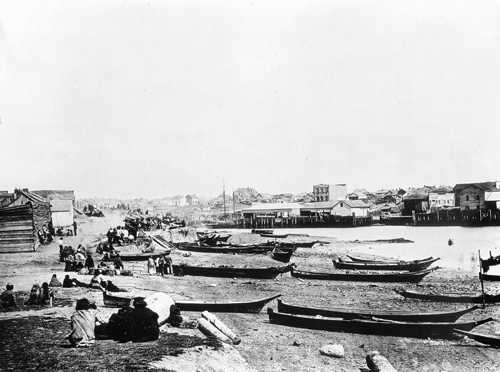
Songhees village. Victoria Harbour, 1880s.

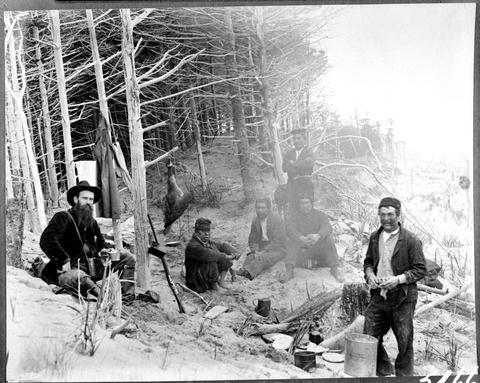
Newton Chittenden and his party. Haida Gwaii, 1884.

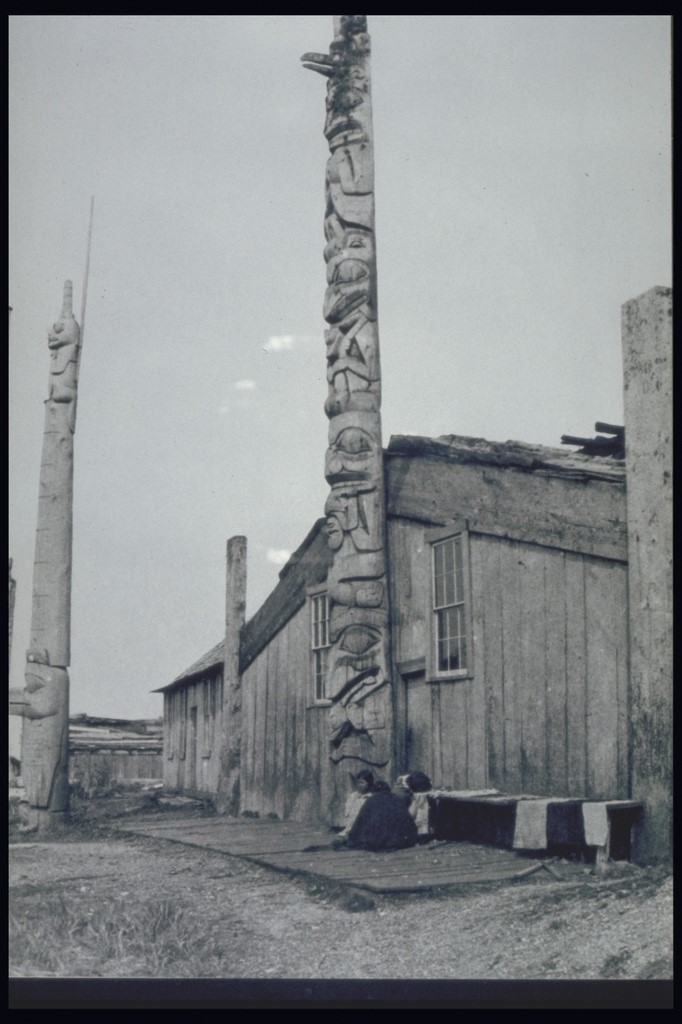
House front totem. Masset, 1884.

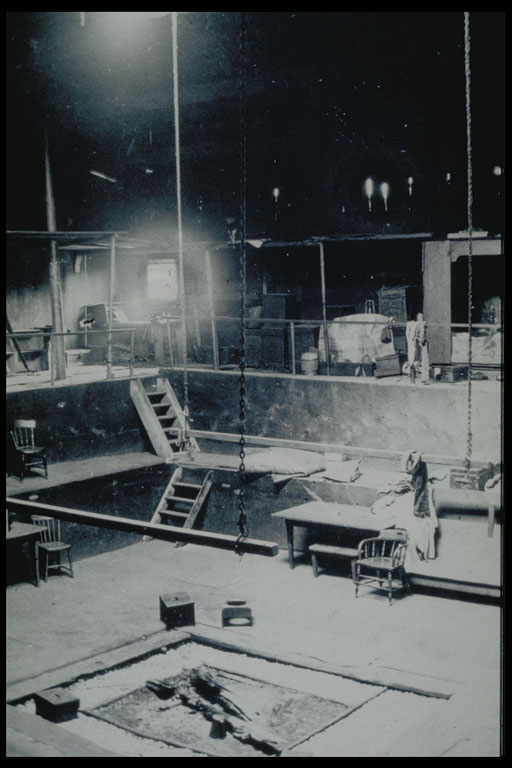
Interior of Chief Wiah's house. Masset, 1884.

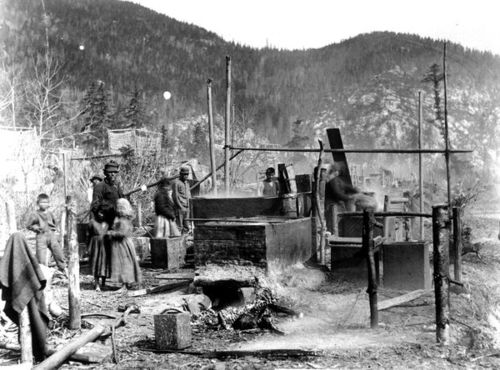
Eulachon rendering camp. Nass River, 1884.

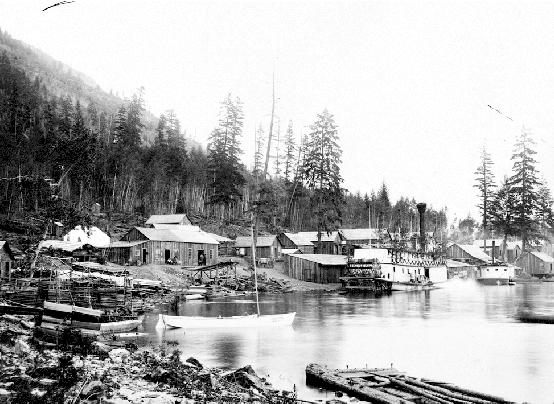
Eagle Pass Landing, 1885.

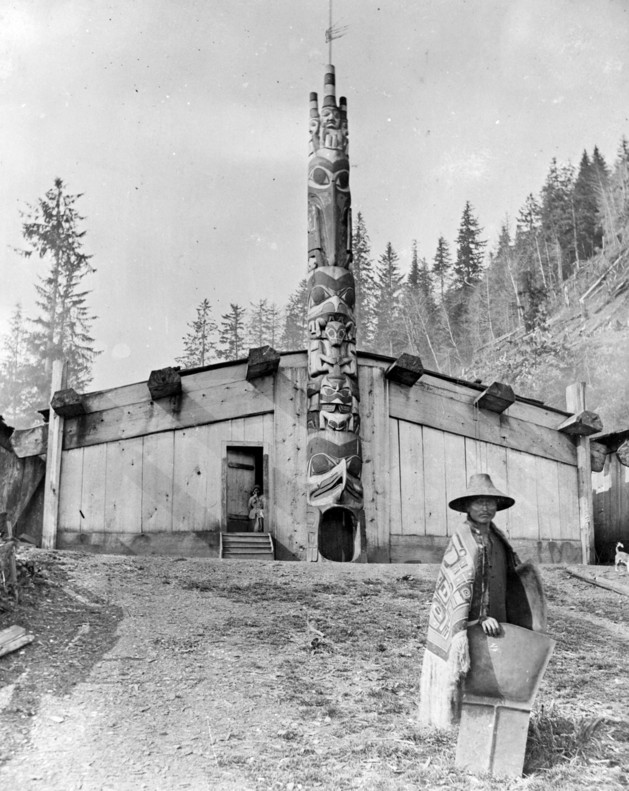
Haida house. Haina, 1888.

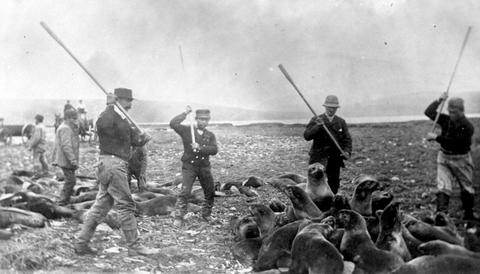
Killing seals. Saint Paul Island, 1892.

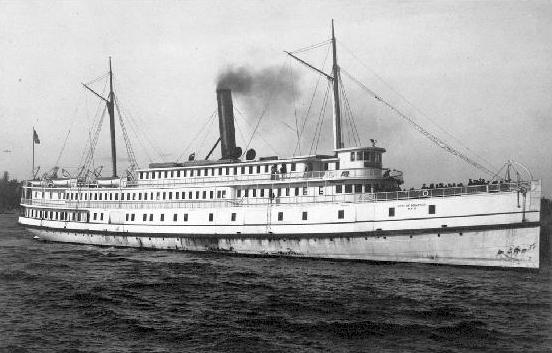
City of Seattle steamship, 1890s.

== Sources ==
- Cleaver, J.D. (1993). "L. Samuel and the West Shore: Images of a Changing Pacific Northwest". Oregon Historical Quarterly. 94: 167–224.
- Gosnell, R. Edward (1906). A History of British Columbia. Chicago: Lewis Publishing Co.
- Mattison, David (1985). "Richard Maynard: Photographer of Victoria, B.C.". History of Photography. 9 (2): 109–129. doi:10.1080/03087298.1985.10442269.
- Mattison, David; Savard, Daniel (1992). "The North-west Pacific Coast: Photographic Voyages 1866-81". History of Photography. 16: 268–288. doi:10.1080/03087298.1992.10442558.
- Mattison, David (1997). "1880-1887: Richard Maynard, the Victoria Shoemaker-Photographer". The Photographers of Onderdonk's Way. Archived from the original on 20 June 2016.
- Mattison, David (2007). "Maynard, Richard". Camera Workers: The British Columbia, Alaska & Yukon Photographic Directory, 1858–1950. Archived from the original on 29 June 2016.
- Palmquist, Peter E.; Kailbourn, Thomas R. (2000). Pioneer Photographers of the Far West: A Biographical Dictionary 1840–1865. Stanford, California: Stanford University Press. ISBN 0-8047-3883-1.
- Savard, Dan (2010). Images from the Likeness House. Victoria, BC: Royal BC Museum. ISBN 978-0-7726-6150-0.
- Wilks, Claire Weissman (1980). The Magic Box: The Eccentric Genius of Hannah Maynard. Toronto: Exile Editions. ISBN 0-920428-34-7.
