= Antoine Claudet =

French photographer (1797–1867)

- Claudet in 1850
- Born: Antoine François Jean Claudet; 18 August 1797; La Croix-Rousse, France
- Died: 17 September 1867 (aged 70); London, England, UK
- Resting place: Highgate Cemetery
- Occupation: Photographer
- Years active: 1841−1858
- Known for: Pioneering photography
- Spouse: Julia Claudet
- Children: Francis George Claudet

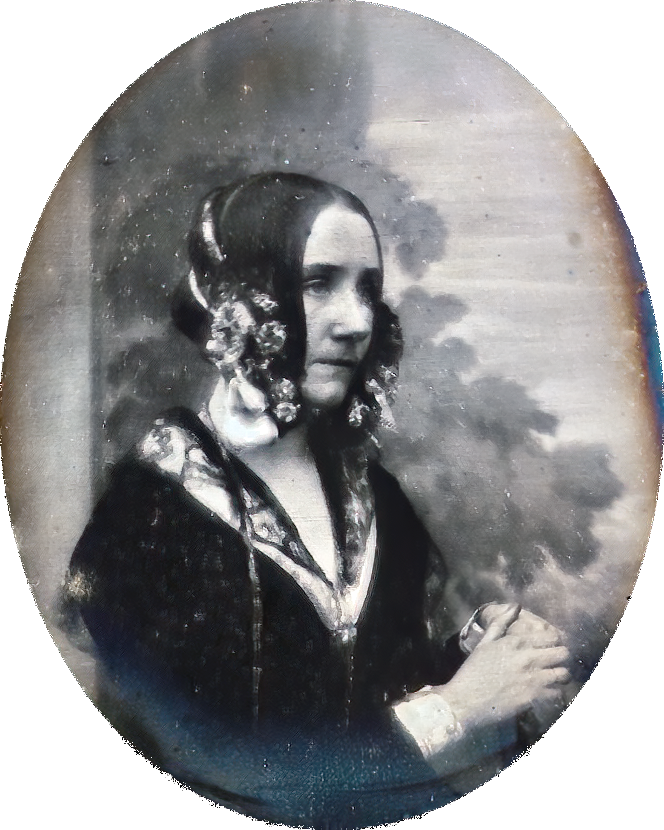
Ada Byron's daguerreotype by Claudet, c. 1843.

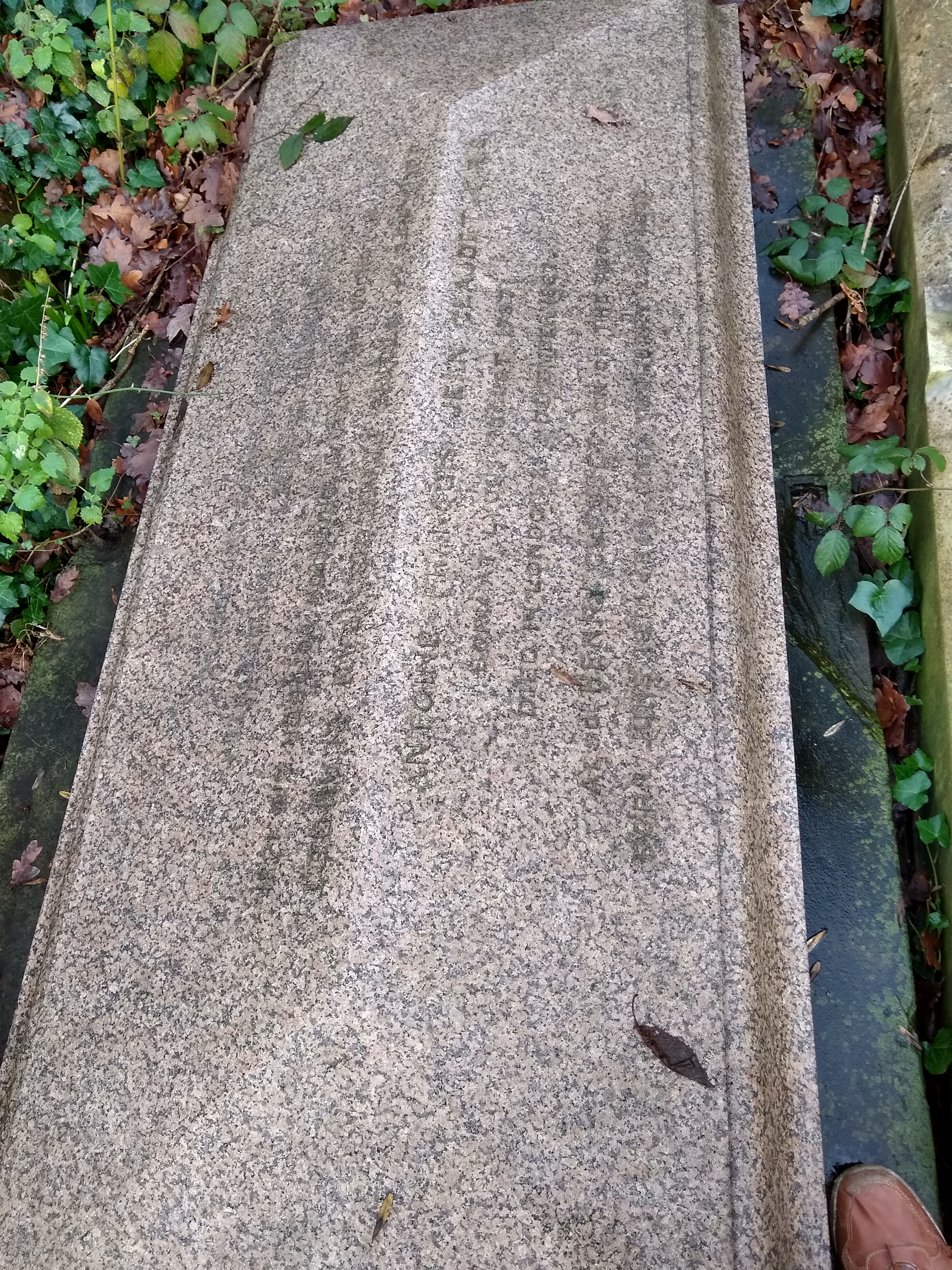
Grave of Antoine Claudet in Highgate Cemetery (West side)

Antoine François Jean Claudet (August 18, 1797 – December 27, 1867) was a French photographer and artist active in London who produced daguerreotypes.

== Early years ==
Claudet was born in La Croix-Rousse, France, the son of Claude Claudet, a cloth merchant and Etiennette Julie Montagnat.

== Career ==
Early in his career Claudet headed a glass factory at Choisy-le-Roi, Paris, together with Georges Bontemps, and moved to England to promote the factory with a shop in High Holborn, London. Having acquired a share in L. J. M. Daguerre's invention, he became one of England's first commercial photographers using the daguerreotype process for portraiture, improving the sensitizing process by using chlorine (instead of bromine) in addition to iodine, thus gaining greater rapidity of action.

He invented the red darkroom safelight, and it was he who suggested the idea of using a series of photographs to create the illusion of movement. The idea of using painted backdrops has also been attributed to him.

From 1841 to 1851 he operated a studio on the roof of the Adelaide Gallery (now the Nuffield Centre), behind St. Martin's in the Fields church, London, where in 1843 he took one of only two surviving photographs of Ada Lovelace. He opened additional studios at the Colosseum, Regent's Park (1847–1851) and in 1851 he moved his entire business to 107 Regent Street, where he established what he called a "Temple to Photography".

It has been estimated that he made 1,800 pictures every year with subjects including Michael Faraday and Charles Babbage. His daguerreotype of Hemi Pomara, in the National Library of Australia, is the oldest known photograph of any Māori person.

In 1848 he produced the photographometer, an instrument designed to measure the intensity of photogenic rays; and in 1849 he brought out the focimeter, for securing a perfect focus in photographic portraiture.

He was elected a fellow of the Royal Society in 1853, and in 1858 he produced the stereomonoscope, in reply to a challenge from Sir David Brewster.

Claudet received many honours, among which was the appointment, in 1853, as "Photographer-in-ordinary" to Queen Victoria, and the award, ten years later, of an honor from Napoleon III of France.

== Family and death ==
Antoine and Julia Claudet had eight children, the youngest of whom was Francis George Claudet (1837–1906) who became a noted amateur photographer in Canada.

Antoine Claudet died in London in 1867 and is buried in Highgate Cemetery. Less than a month after his death, his "Temple to photography" was burnt down, and most of his valuable photographs were lost.
