= Elizabeth Lazebnik =

Latvian Canadian filmmaker

Elizabeth Lazebnik is a Latvian Canadian filmmaker from Toronto, Ontario, whose full-length feature debut Be Still was released in 2021. The film, which premiered at the 2021 Vancouver International Film Festival, was a Vancouver Film Critics Circle nominee for Best British Columbia Film, and Lazebnik was a nominee for the One to Watch award, at the Vancouver Film Critics Circle Awards 2021. The film also won three Leo awards and received the Best Canadian Feature Film award at the 20th Female Eye Film Festival. Be Still is scheduled for release in 2023 by Game Theory Films.

Before Be Still, Lazebnik directed several short films. Three of these premiered at the Toronto International Film Festival.Abeer, was the winner of the Lindalee Tracey Award in 2008.

== Filmography ==
- The Multiple Selves of Hannah Maynard - 2005, short
- Red Like Meat - 2008, short
- Abeer - 2008, short
- Belonging - 2008, short
- The Patient - 2011, short
- Safe Room - 2012, short
- Liompa - 2014, short
- Without a Name - 2018, short
- I Want to Tell You Something - 2020, short
- Be Still - 2021
