= Adventures in Public School =

- Theatrical release poster
- Directed by: Kyle Rideout
- Screenplay by: Josh Epstein; Kyle Rideout
- Produced by: Josh Epstein
- Starring: Judy Greer; Daniel Doheny; Siobhan Williams; Andrew McNee; Andrew Herr; Russell Peters; Grace Park
- Cinematography: Stirling Bancroft
- Edited by: Yvann Thibaudeau
- Music by: Matthew Rogers
- Production company: Motion 58 Entertainment
- Distributed by: Gravitas Ventures
- Release dates: September 9, 2017 (TIFF); April 27, 2018 (United States)
- Running time: 86 minutes
- Country: Canada
- Language: English
- Box office: $8,090

Adventures in Public School is a 2017 Canadian teen comedy film directed by Kyle Rideout, who also co-wrote the screenplay with Josh Epstein. It stars Judy Greer, Daniel Doheny, Siobhan Williams, Andrew McNee, Andrew Herr, Russell Peters, and Grace Park.

The film had its world premiere at the Toronto International Film Festival on September 9, 2017, under the title Public Schooled. It was released in the United States on April 27, 2018, by Gravitas Ventures.

== Cast ==
- Judy Greer as Claire Heap, Liam's mother
- Daniel Doheny as Liam Heap, Claire's son
- Siobhan Williams as Anastasia
- Russell Peters as Mr. Germaine
- Grace Park as MacKenzie
- Andrea Bang as Autumn, Mackenzie's daughter
- Andrew McNee as Mr. Kelly
- Andrew Herr as BDC

== Production ==
In October 2016, it was announced Judy Greer had been cast in the film, with Kyle Rideout directing from a screenplay he co-wrote with Josh Epstein. Epstein served as the film's producer, while Justine Whyte and Adam Folk served as executive producer and co-producer, respectively. The Canadian Film Centre and Telefilm Canada co-financed the film. In November 2016, Russell Peters and Daniel Doheny joined the cast of the film.

=== Filming ===
Principal photography took place in Vancouver, Canada, from November to December 2016.

== Release ==
The film had its world premiere at the Toronto International Film Festival on September 9, 2017. Shortly after, Gravitas Ventures acquired U.S. distribution rights to the film. It was released theatrically and through video on demand on April 27, 2018.

In December, the Toronto International Film Festival named the film to its annual Canada's Top Ten list of the ten best Canadian films.

== Reception ==
=== Critical response ===
On review aggregator Rotten Tomatoes, the film holds an approval rating of 75% based on 8 reviews, with an average rating of 5.90/10.

=== Awards ===
Rideout received a nomination for the Directors Guild of Canada's DGC Discovery Award.
