= Youngblood (1986 film) =

1986 film by Peter Markle

- Theatrical release poster
- Directed by: Peter Markle
- Written by: Peter Markle; John Whitman
- Produced by: Peter Markle; Peter Bart; Patrick Wells
- Starring: Rob Lowe; Cynthia Gibb; Ed Lauter; Patrick Swayze
- Cinematography: Mark Irwin
- Edited by: Jack Hofstra; Stephen E. Rivkin
- Music by: William Orbit
- Production companies: United Artists; The Guber-Peters Company
- Distributed by: MGM/UA Entertainment Co.
- Release date: January 30, 1986 (United States)
- Running time: 110 minutes
- Country: United States
- Language: English
- Budget: $8 million
- Box office: $15,448,384

Youngblood (released in the Philippines as Fight for Love) is a 1986 American sports drama film directed and co-produced by Peter Markle; co-written by John Whitman; and starring Rob Lowe, Cynthia Gibb and Patrick Swayze. The film's cast includes Keanu Reeves in his first feature film role.

== Plot ==
Dean Youngblood, a 17-year-old farmhand from rural New York, has dreams of playing in the National Hockey League. Dean voices these dreams to his father who disapproves; however, Dean's brother, Kelly, convinces their father to relent. Dean travels to Canada to try out for the Hamilton Mustangs where he demonstrates his offensive skills but displays a lack of physical toughness.

Dean earns the nickname "Pretty Boy" brought on by his rivalry with fellow hockey player Carl Racki. Racki, who is competing for a spot, engages him in a fight and quickly defeats him. Despite this, the Mustangs head coach, a former NHL All-Star, selects Dean for the team. Dean begins a flirtation with the coach's daughter, Jessie.

After his team mentor, Derek Sutton, is deliberately injured by Racki (now with a rival team), Dean returns home. His brother inspires him to keep playing, and teaches him some fighting skills off of the ice, his father teaches him on the ice. Dean returns to the team, and before the final game of the Memorial Cup playoffs, he meets with Derek who convinces him to focus on winning the game instead of getting even with Racki.

The game ends with a winning penalty shot goal by Dean with 3 seconds left. As time expires, he confronts and defeats Racki in a fight and is carried off the ice on the shoulders of his teammates.

== Cast ==
- Rob Lowe as Dean Youngblood
  - Charlie Wasley as young Dean Youngblood
- Ed Lauter as Murray Chadwick
- Cynthia Gibb as Jessie Chadwick
- Jim Youngs as Kelly Youngblood
  - Ricky Davis as young Kelly Youngblood
- Patrick Swayze as Derek Sutton
- Fionnula Flanagan as Miss McGill
- Ken James as Frazier
- George J. Finn as Carl Racki
- Peter Faussett as Huey
- Eric Nesterenko as Blane Youngblood
- Keanu Reeves as Heaver

=== Cameos ===
- Peter Zezel as Rossini, Mustang Player #1.
- Steve Thomas as Jordie, Mustang Player #4.

== Production ==
The filming of Youngblood took place in the east end of Toronto in the summer of 1984. Ted Reeve Arena was used as the setting for the interior of the Hamilton Mustangs home rink while Scarborough Arena Gardens was used for the setting of the arena's exterior. St Michaels College School arena was used as well. While there was a Memorial Cup eligible Ontario Hockey League (OHL) team located in Hamilton in 1986, they were called the Hamilton Steelhawks, as compared to the film's fictional Hamilton Mustangs.

Several of the cast and crew had actual hockey experience and skills, though star Rob Lowe had to learn to skate, and both he and Patrick Swayze, a better skater, used doubles for many of their on-ice skating scenes. Director and writer Peter Markle was a former minor-pro and international player for the USA. Cinematographer Mark Irwin, a Canadian, wore skates and a helmet and devised a special rig for shooting hockey scenes on the ice. The film's hockey consultant, Eric Nesterenko, was a 20 year National Hockey League veteran and Stanley Cup Champion, in addition to playing the father of Lowe's character. Keanu Reeves, who played the Mustangs goalie, had played goalie at a Toronto high school, earning the nickname "The Wall". George Finn, who played villain Carl Racki, was a former major junior player, and enforcer, in the OHL. Many of the other uncredited team members were actual major junior or NCAA hockey players, as well as two active NHL players, Steve Thomas and Peter Zezel.

Lowe later said he "hated" learning how to skate. "I don't like any sport where you're already exhausted when you're done putting on the equipment. But that said, once I got the equipment on and was out on the ice, I loved that. I loved hitting people, being hit, skating. I love the exertion and competition, so that was all great. But it's a lot of work putting all of that shit on! Give me a surfboard and let me just paddle into the ocean."

== Release ==
Youngblood was released in the United States on January 30, 1986. In the Philippines, the film was released as Fight for Love six years later, on July 15, 1992.

=== Critical response ===
The film gained a mediocre reception, with critics finding the plot derivative. It became a popular VHS video rental and cable TV showing.

On the review aggregator website Rotten Tomatoes, 44% of 9 critics' reviews are positive. Audiences polled by CinemaScore gave the film an average grade of "A-" on an A+ to F scale.

== Remake ==
On September 7, 2022, it was announced that Aircraft Pictures and Dolphin Entertainment would produce Charles Officer's remake of Youngblood with Photon Films handling distribution, and filming set to start in Canada in 2023. Pre-production was paused in 2023 when Officer had passed. Production began early 2025 with director Hubert Davis taking over as director as they began filming an on-ice scene at the Sadlon Arena in Barrie, Ontario during the intermission of a Barrie Colts OHL game. The cast includes Ashton James, Blair Underwood, Shawn Doyle and Henri Picard.

Youngblood premiered at the 2025 Toronto International Film Festival.

== See also ==
- List of American films of 1986
- List of films about ice hockey
