= Famous (rapper) =

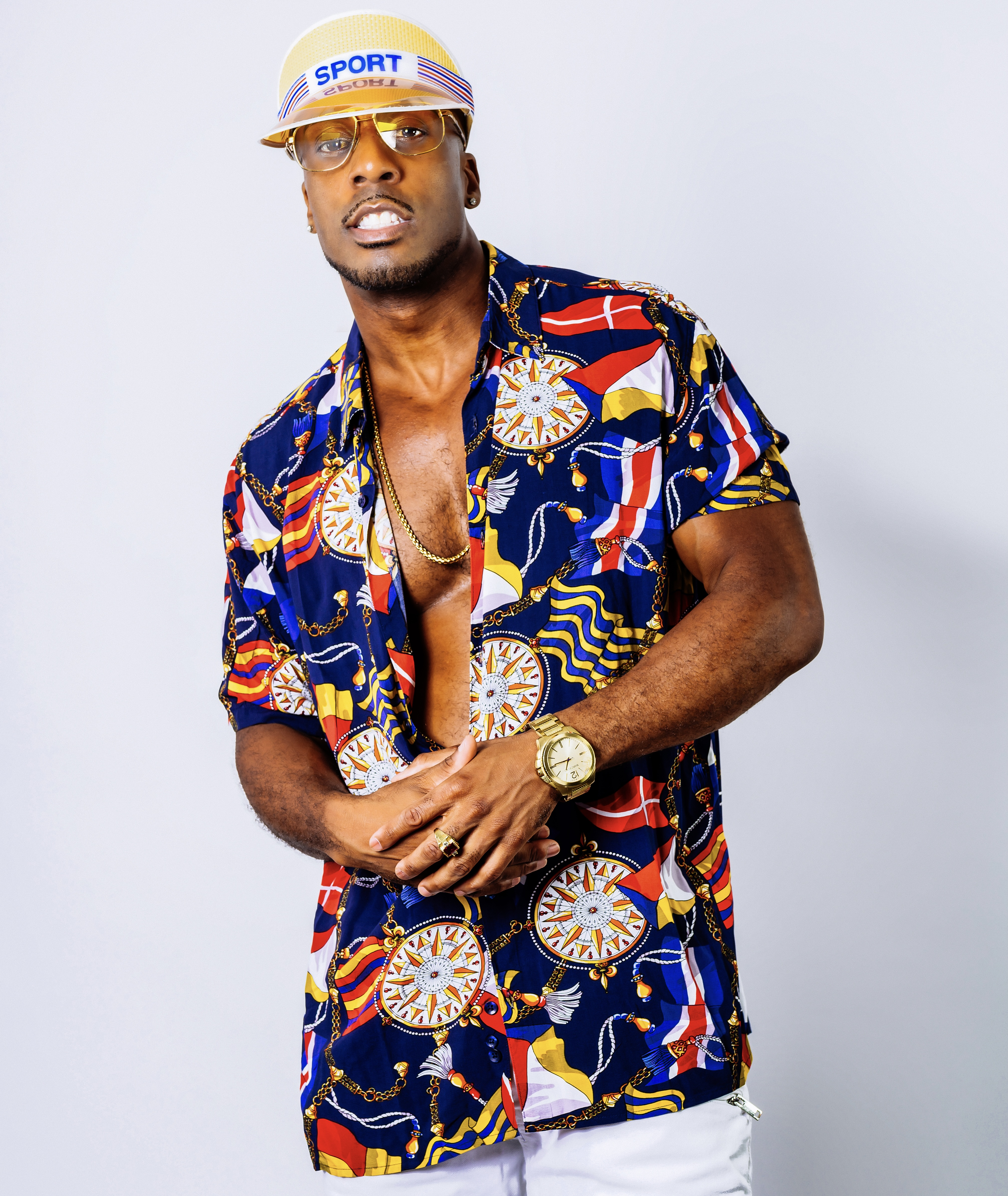
- Famous

Background information
- Born: Ashton Bishop
- Origin: Montreal
- Genres: Rap
- Occupations: Rapper and radio broadcaster

Famous is the stage name of Ashton Bishop, a Canadian rapper and radio broadcaster. He is most noted for his 2008 EP I Rap Now, which received a Juno Award nomination for Rap Recording of the Year at the Juno Awards of 2009.

Originally from Montreal, he studied music production at Trebas Institute, and moved to Toronto after one of his teachers, Jane McGarrigle, arranged an internship for him. He subsequently became a radio personality on Toronto's CFXJ-FM, and released I Rap Now in 2008. The album's most successful single was "Fourth Biggest City", a song about Toronto. Later that same year, he recorded and released the non-album track "President Too", a celebration of the historic importance of Barack Obama's victory in the 2008 United States presidential election.

When he received his Juno Award nomination in 2009, he told the press that he was flattered by the nomination but did not expect to actually win, as he was up against Kardinal Offishall's Not 4 Sale and felt it was clearly Kardi's time rather than his. Later that year he released Goddess Girl, a music and video project consisting of a short film and a soundtrack EP produced by Burd & Keyz.

In 2011, he had his first acting role in Reza Dahya's short film Esha. In 2011 and 2012 he released Road to Center Stage, a series of three EPs leading to the release of his full-length debut album Center Stage in 2014.

Unusually for a Canadian musician of non-Asian descent, Famous has had greater success in Asia than in Canada. In 2017, he released the single "HeiHeiDe 黑黑的 (First Black Man Rapping In Chinese)", in which he performed a Chinese language rap, and filmed the music video at the Dragon and Tiger Pagodas in Kaohsiung, Taiwan. He has also hosted a radio show for Taiwan's International Community Radio Taipei.
