= Zezel =

Zezel is a surname. Notable people with the surname include:

- Jared Zezel (born 1991), American curler
- Peter Zezel (1965–2009), Canada ice hockey player

== See also ==
- Zezelj
