= Burd & Keyz =

Canadian musical group

- Origin: Markham, Ontario, Canada
- Genres: Hip hop, R&B
- Years active: 2004–present
- Members: Andrew "Burd" Liburd
- Past members: Anthony "Durty Keyz" James (deceased)

Burd & Keyz is a Canadian hip-hop and R&B production group from Markham, Ontario, Canada. Some notable acts they have produced for are Kardinal Offishall, MGK, Meek Mill, Pusha T, and more recently A$AP Ferg, Fabolous, and French Montana.

== Music career ==
Andrew "Burd" Liburd and Anthony "Durty Keyz" James, were both raised in the Toronto suburb of Markham. The two began producing in high school when they discovered a mutual interest in music, specifically in beat-making and production.

In 2004, James and Liburd officially formed the production duo Burd & Keyz.

On June 28, 2010, Keyz died of a bacterial infection called streptococcus. He was only 23 years old. A tribute video was released on July 4, 2010.

Burd still produces music under the name "Burd & Keyz".

=== Keyz of Life ===
On December 13, 2011, Burd released a tribute album to Keyz titled Keyz of Life, and offered it as a free download.

The lead single, "LoveSpeak", which featured R&B/Soul Toronto native Shi Wisdom and rapper KJ, was released on June 6, 2011. The video was shot at Wisdom's Barber Shop & Beauty Salon in Toronto's Eglinton West neighbourhood. The video was directed by David F. Mewa.

The second single, "Real Nigga Tears (R.N.T.)", featured Rich Kidd from Toronto and DJ Grouch and was released on August 16, 2011. The video, directed by Sean Getti and featuring Burd himself, was released the next month on September 6, 2011.

The third single, "Faithful", featured Toronto artists Luu Breeze, A-Game, and Jahron B, with co-production from fellow Toronto native T-Minus and was released on October 26, 2011. The video, directed by Reza Dahya, was released on March 12, 2012.

The album received positive reviews and lead to an article about Burd & Keyz on the front page of the National Post arts section among other reviews. On April 29, 2012, Keyz of Life was officially released in the United Kingdom.

=== Burd's Eye View ===
On September 11 2026, Burd released Burd's Eye View.

== Production ==
=== 2009 ===
Famous — Goddess Girl

01. I Wanna Know Your Name (ft Oh!) (Re-Master)

02. Screwface Rap

03. Hater's Eulogy

04. The Declaration

05. Time To Decide

06. Fresh Cut

07. Goddess Girl (ft Luu Breeze & Oh!)

08. How It's Gotta Be (ft Kim Davis)

=== 2010 ===
Nickelus F — Season Premiere

03. World Renown

=== 2011 ===
Rochester — Born to Be

02. Let My Tape Rock (ft Luu Breeze & K. Ryan)

03. Turn Me On

07. Yuu (Young Luv II)

08. Tek Mi Money (ft Pachino)

11. Triumphant

Luu Breeze — #HollaLaLuuie

03. HollaLaLuuie

04. Bin Laden

Burd & Keyz — Keyz of Life

01. Divine Brown – Intro (produced by McCallaman)

02. SonReal x Nickelus F x Blake Carrington – Keyz of Life

03. Promise x Redway x Rochester – Say A Prayer

04. Interlude I

05. Luu Breeze x A-Game x PartyNextDoor – Faithful (co-produced with T-Minus)

06. Lokz – Duet

07. Burdstrumental (Never Get Over You)

08. Interlude II

09. Shi Wisdom x KJ – LoveSpeak

10. Burdstrumental (Losing My Bestfriend) (co-produced with McCallaman)

11. Interlude III

12. Rich Kidd x DJ Grouch – R.N.T. (Real Nigga Tears)

13. OmarLunan aka Oh! x Dwayne Morgan x O'Sound – Shine (produced by T-Minus)

14. Divine Brown x Kardinal Offishall – The Other Side

=== 2012 ===
JD Era — No Handouts

10. I Need You (ft Shi Wisdom)

Kardinal Offishall

00. Ignorant Shit

00. Reppin' 4 My City (ft Wiz Kid)

Peter Jackson — Fresh Start

10. #1 Fan (ft Karl Wolf)

Troy Ave — Bricks In My Backpack 3

07. Chiddy Chiddy Bang Bang

08. F.U.B.U.

Troy Ave — White Christmas

15. Red Lipstick (ft Chase N. Cashe)

Chase N. Cashe

00. Watch Me

=== 2013 ===
LA Leakers — LA Leakers Presents: The 2013 Draft Picks

14. I Can Do That (ft Chase N. Cashe)

MGK — Black Flag

03. Peso (ft Meek Mill & Pusha T)

08. 50 (ft French Montana)

The Game — OKE: Operation Kill Everything

16. You Don't Know

SonReal

00. Everywhere We Go

Luu Breeze — City In Gold

03. Show Me Something (Produced with xSDTRK)
04. Say Word
05. Sound Off
06. That Aint You
11. La Rendezvous (ft Andreena Mill & Darryl Riley)

Chase N Cashe — Heir Waves

12. M.D.N.B. (Produced with Chase N Cashe)
15. I Can Do That

Aion Clarke

00. Ready

Bonic

00. Cheerios (ft. Dom Kennedy)

=== 2014 ===
Tory Lanez — Lost Cause

09. "Priceless" (produced with Daniel Worthy and Tory Lanez)

GVND - Days Like This - EP

03. Money Right (ft Luu Breeze)

Kirko Bangz — Progression V: Young Texas Playa

03. "For Da 99" (produced with Jordon Manswell)
06. "288" (produced with Jordon Manswell)
08. "Screaming" (ft. Bando Jones) (produced with Sound M.O.B.)
10. "Then I Came Dine" (ft. Riff Raff) (produced with Jordon Manswell and Sevn Thomas)
18. "Pray For Me"

Shi Wisdom — Intervention [EP]

02. Monster
03. Magic

Sonreal — One Long Day

07. Nothing Interlude (ft Willa)

=== 2015 ===
Devontee — District Vibe

11. All I Ever Wanted

Marty Baller

00. Things We Go Through

SonReal — For The Town

06. For The Town

Jazz Cartier — Marauding in Paradise

09. The Downtown Cliche (Produced with Sevn Thomas)

=== 2016 ===
Donnie

00. Come Through (ft Daniel Caesar)

Derin Falana

00. The Pick Up (produced with Jordon Manswell and Sevn Thomas)

Kirko Bangz

00. Love and Basketball (produced with The Mekanics)

Ye Ali

00. Used To (ft Pollari)
00. Ye Ali - Late Nite Flexxx (ft Louis Val and Laioung)(produced with Xclu)

A$AP Ferg — Always Strive and Prosper

19. Don't Mind (ft Fabolous and French Montana) (produced with The Mekanics) (Bonus Track)

Luu Breeze — Something in the Shade

02. Came Up

Luu Breeze

00. Lost

J-Soul

00. Richmond Hill (produced with Jordon Manswell)

BZZY — A Part of Everything

14. Stubborn

CJ Fly

00. Raising The Bar (produced with Sevn Thomas)

Audra The Rapper

00. Sometimes (produced with Sevn Thomas and Jordon Manswell)

=== 2017 ===
R. City (Rock City)

00. Who To Trust

Luu Breeze — LoveDontLiveHere

06. Long Island Ice T (Produced with Jordon Manswell)

Ye Ali — Passion & Patience

03. Closer (Produced with Jordon Manswell)

05. Mixing (ft Johnny Yukon) (Produced with Foreign Tek)

A1 Bentley

00. Toot That Whoa Whoa! (ft Prince Christian) (Produced with Foreign Tek)

=== 2018 ===
Burd & Keyz

00. Time to Go (ft 24HRS, Young Troy, and Ye Ali) (Produced with Jordon Manswell)

A1 Bentley

00. Toot That Whoa Whoa! (Remix) (ft Chris Brown, Prince Christian) (Produced with Foreign Tek)

Jazz Cartier — Fleurever

02. Security (Produced with Sean Fischer, Jordon Manswell, Ryan Hemsworth, & Lantz)

=== 2019 ===
Pilla B

00. Big Chopper (ft King Louie)

00. Fuck It Up (Additional production by Joel Chambers)

Donnie — From The Beginning To The End

07. Life of the Party (ft Daniel Caesar)

=== 2020 ===
Pilla B

00. Vanilla (produced with Joel Chambers & Cloudeyes)

4TUNAT

00. Morning Wake Up

DillanPonders — Because We're Alive

01. Whole New Flex (produced with Joel Chambers)

=== 2021 ===
Kirko Bangz

00. Heart Safe

4TUNAT

00. Feel Like Me

=== 2022 ===
Jalen Santoy & JZAC

00. Dead Right (produced with Drew80HD)

=== 2023 ===
Tona

00. Lower East Side (L.E.S.) (ft Burd & Keyz)

4TUNAT — See You Soon

06. Rocker

Ling Hussle — If Only You Stayed

07. London

Fame Holiday — Strictly For Summer

04. Kissing In My Ride (ft Romeyo Wilson)

One Acen — One Is Da Loneliest Number

05. Disappointed (produced with Drew80HD, Mudzmayn, Kemy Siala)

=== 2024 ===
Big Hit, Hit-Boy & The Alchemist — Black & Whites

09. Count Your Blessings

Jon Kabongo — Still Rich

15. Still Rich (ft Rich Kidd)

Omega Mighty

00. Winning

=== 2025 ===
Omega Mighty - REGENESIS

02. Oulalala

11. C**k Up (ft Pamputtae)

Diamond

00. Where The Baddies At? (produced with Drewdini & Tyler Coolidge)

Tobi - ELEMENTS Vol. 2

05. Changes

=== 2026 ===
Burd & Keyz - Burd's Eye View

01. The Intro (ft TheyBetterSing)

02. Ignorant (ft Fergie Baby) (produced with Kevin Mitchell and KADDYX4)

03. Miracles (ft TOBi)

04. All Mines (ft DCMBR and Ye Ali)

05. Body (ft Cae)

06. Queen of the Jungle (ft 4TUNAT)

07. Want It (ft Jalen Jackson)

08. Lower East Side (ft Tona)

09. 1 Strike (ft HRTBRKFEVER and Devontée Woe)

10. Burdy's Prayer (I Want To Love You) (ft Tarik Henry)

== Awards and nominations ==
=== Singles produced ===
Year	Single	Chart positions						Album	Certifications
Year	Single	US Hot 100	US R&B	US Rap	US Pop	CAN	UK	Album	Certifications
2014	"Everywhere We Go" (SonReal)	–	–	–	–	–	–	Non-album single	MC: Gold

Year	Award	Category	Result
2013	Juno Awards	Rap Recording of the Year (JD Era - No Handouts)	Nominated
2014	Juno Awards	Rap Recording of the Year ("SonReal - Everywhere We Go")	Nominated
2014	MuchMusic Video Award	Video of the Year ("SonReal - Everywhere We Go" (produced by Burd and Keyz))	Nominated
2014	MuchMusic Video Award	Director the Year ("SonReal - Everywhere We Go" (produced by Burd and Keyz))	Nominated
2014	MuchMusic Video Award	Your Fave Video ("SonReal - Everywhere We Go" (produced by Burd and Keyz))	Nominated
2014	MuchMusic Video Award	Hip Hop Video of the Year ("SonReal - Everywhere We Go" (produced by Burd and Keyz))	Nominated
2014	MuchMusic Video Award	MuchFACT Video of the Year ("SonReal - Everywhere We Go" (produced by Burd and Keyz))	Won
2016	Juno Awards	Rap Recording of the Year ("SonReal - For The Town")	Nominated
