= Youngblood (2025 film) =

2025 Canadian sports drama film

- Theatrical release poster
- Directed by: Hubert Davis
- Written by: Charles Officer; Josh Epstein; Kyle Rideout; Seneca Aaron
- Based on: Youngblood by Peter Markle and John Whitman
- Produced by: Anthony Leo; Andrew Rosen
- Starring: Ashton James; Blair Underwood
- Cinematography: Stuart James Cameron
- Edited by: Matt Lyon
- Production companies: Aircraft Pictures; Dolphin Entertainment
- Distributed by: Photon Films (Canada); Well Go USA Entertainment (United States)
- Release dates: September 6, 2025 (TIFF); March 6, 2026 (United States)
- Running time: 104 minutes
- Countries: Canada; United States
- Language: English
- Box office: $1 million

Youngblood is a 2025 sports drama film directed by Hubert Davis. An adaptation of the 1986 film Youngblood, the film stars Ashton James as Dean Youngblood, a young Black hockey player from Detroit who joins a team in Hamilton, Ontario, and struggles to balance competing ideas about what kind of player to be.

The cast also includes Blair Underwood as Dean's father, as well as Shawn Doyle, Alexandra McDonald, Oluniké Adeliyi, Henri Richer-Picard, Emidio Lopes, Donald MacLean Jr., Tamara Podemski, Joris Jarsky, Matt Wells, Keris Hope Hill, Jonathan Valvano, Ty Neckar, Dylan Hawco and Evan Buliung in supporting roles.

== Plot ==
The film begins when Dean "D" Youngblood is a young child living in Detroit. His father, Blane, teaches him and his older brother to stand up for themselves and fight on the hockey rink when other players disrespect them. Their mother, Ruby, tries to temper Blane's advice by reminding Dean that you win hockey games by scoring goals, not by fighting. She gives Dean a gold wing-wheel hockey pin in the shape of the logo of the Detroit Red Wings.

When Dean is nine, his mother dies unexpectedly. After his mother's death, his father is harder on him and his brother. He emphasizes that fighting is the way to play hockey.

The film skips forward to Dean as a teenager playing hockey. A white player on the other team chirps him using racist language. Dean slashes the player from behind with a two handed slash using his hockey stick.

A year later, Dean has been suspended from hockey because of the incident. He and his older brother Kelly are working for their father's roofing business. Dean's old coach surprises the family with a visit. The Hamilton Mustangs, an ECHL hockey team, have suffered many injuries during the season. Their coach, Murray Chadwick, needs a player who can help his team win the playoffs. Two players will try out for the spot. Dean's father is dismissive, but the coach tells the family that this is likely Dean's only chance to rejoin professional hockey. After the coach leaves, Kelly reveals he has heard rumors that Chadwick does not treat his players well.

Dean travels to Hamilton, Ontario, to try out for the team. He is competing against a white player for the spot. Chadwick intends to go with the white player, but the assistant coach reminds him that they need to change things up to make the playoffs. Chadwick chooses Dean.

Dean is closed off when he joins the team. The captain of the team, Denis "Sutty" Sutton," talks to Dean, but Dean does not respond. Dean meets a pretty girl, Jessie and she encourages him to be more social. Eventually Dean and Sutty become friends. Jessie and Dean start to date.

The team begins their playoff run. Chadwick initially benches Dean. At Dean's father's insistence, Dean talks to the coach and asks to be paired with Sutty. Chadwick tells him off but eventually obliges. The duo immediately begin scoring goals.

Dean continues to struggle with his reactions and fighting with others. Jessie reveals to Dean that Coach Chadwick, her father, had similar struggles and that he was removed from a previous team because he hit a player.

A player on the opposing team, Carl Racki, badly injures Sutty. Dean has to decide whether to take revenge on the player or score goals to win the game. He chooses to win the game.

The film ends with flashes of Dean playing for the Los Angeles Kings in the NHL.

== Cast ==
- Ashton James as Dean Youngblood
  - Wagner Shell III as Young Dean Youngblood
- Blair Underwood as Blane Youngblood, Dean's father
- Shawn Doyle as Coach Murray Chadwick
- Alexandra McDonald as Jessie Chadwick
- Oluniké Adeliyi as Ruby Youngblood, Dean's mother
- Henri Richer-Picard as Denis "Sutty" Sutton
- Emidio Lopes as Kelly Youngblood, Dean's older brother
  - Quintin Glasgow as Young Kelly Youngblood
- Donald MacLean Jr. as Carl Racki
- Tamara Podemski as Ms. McGill
- Joris Jarsky as Lucas Turco
- Matt Wells as Coach Murphy
- Keris Hope Hill as Winnie
- Jonathan Valvano as Josh Lempelius
- Ty Neckar as Xavier Harris
- Dylan Hawco as Connor Hewitt
- Evan Buliung as Ervin

== Production ==
Production on the film was first announced in 2022, with Charles Officer slated to write and direct it. Although the screenplay was completed with co-writers Josh Epstein, Kyle Rideout and Seneca Aaron, the film had not yet gone into production by the time of Officer's death in 2023, and Davis took over helming the film.

In a scene that takes place in Coach Murray Chadwick's office, a framed jersey can be seen on the wall with the name Officer stitched on the back. This is in tribute to Charles Officer. The film was also dedicated to him.

It was shot in winter 2025 in Hamilton and Barrie. A key scene in the film was shot at Barrie's Sadlon Arena during the intermission in a real Barrie Colts game to get the fan reaction.

== Release ==
The film premiered at the 2025 Toronto International Film Festival. It is also screened in the Borsos Competition program at the 2025 Whistler Film Festival. The film was acquired for U.S. distribution by Well Go USA Entertainment, and it was released in the United States on March 6, 2026.

== Critical response ==
For Exclaim!, Rachel Ho wrote that "James's performance as Dean complements his turn as Rome in Boxcutter earlier this summer. Where Rome showed off the up-and-coming actor's abilities to embody insecurity and apprehension, Dean gives James the chance to occupy the other side of the coin as a brash teen filled with an anger instilled by his father (Blair Underwood). Rather than simply playing Dean as singularly enraged, James lends the character dimension and depth. It's another commanding performance that only hints at what's to come for the Toronto actor."

On the review aggregator website Rotten Tomatoes, 67% of 24 critics' reviews are positive.

== See also ==
- Black players in ice hockey
- List of films about ice hockey
