= Mind of a Stoner =

2013 song by Machine Gun Kelly

Single by Machine Gun Kelly featuring Wiz Khalifa

from the album Black Flag
- Released: June 23, 2013
- Recorded: 2012–2013
- Genre: Hip hop
- Length: 2:49
- Label: Bad Boy; Interscope
- Songwriter(s): Colson Baker; Cameron Jibril Thomaz
- Producer(s): Dre$ki; Brian Empire

Machine Gun Kelly singles chronology
"Black Tuxedos" (2013)	"Mind of a Stoner" (2013)	"No Miracles" (2013)

Wiz Khalifa singles chronology
"See Me" (2013)	"Mind of a Stoner" (2013)	"I Bet" (2013)

"Mind of a Stoner" is a song by American rapper Machine Gun Kelly. It was released on June 23, 2013, for digital download by Bad Boy and Interscope. The song features guest vocals from fellow American rapper Wiz Khalifa.

== Background and release ==
MGK announced the mixtape on January 28, 2013. On February 18, 2013, Kelly revealed the mixtape's title to be "Black Flag", along with the cover art. Black Flag was released on June 23, 2013, with "Mind of a Stoner" enlisted as the fifth track on the project. The song was officially recognized as the fifth single on February 10, 2014.

== Music video ==
The music video was released February 11, 2014. It was directed by Charlie Zwick, and features cameos from Kid Ink, and Danielle Fishel, whom he acknowledges as Topanga. The video's concept shows Kelly speaking of his problems and personal troubles, walking up to a bus stop where Khalifa offers Kelly weed, and the rest of the video sees Kelly smoking his problems away. as of 2024 the music video had attained over 190 million views, making it one of Baker's most popular.

== Awards ==
Year	Organization	Award	Result	Ref.
2014	Ohio Hip Hop Awards	Best National Music Video	Won	
2014	Ohio Hip Hop Awards	Best National Collaboration	Won	
