= Evan Buliung =

Canadian actor

- Born: Brantford, Ontario, Canada
- Citizenship: Canadian
- Occupations: Actor, singer

Evan Buliung is a Canadian actor and singer, who is best known for his work in musical theatre. In 2006, Buliung originated the role of Aragorn in the world premiere production of Lord of the Rings, which played at the Princess of Wales Theatre in Toronto. He also originated the role of Khashoggi in the Canadian premiere production of We Will Rock You in 2007. He also played Bruce Bechdel in a Toronto production of Fun Home, for which he won a Dora Award. In 2019, Buliung originated the role of Larry Murphy in the Canadian premiere production of Dear Evan Hansen, which played at the Royal Alexandra Theatre. In 2023, Buliung also originated the role of Pierre Bezukhov in the Canadian premiere production of Natasha, Pierre & The Great Comet of 1812.

Buliung has also appeared in several television shows and films. This included a main role in the television series Holly Hobbie (2018–2022), and recurring roles in Canadian drama series The Best Years (2007–2009) and Departure (2020).

== Early life ==
Buliung was born in Brantford, Ontario, on December 18, 1974 where he attended Brantford Collegiate Institute. He was involved in local community theatre organizations, such as Dufferin Players and Theatre Brantford. He also attended a summer theatre school ran by Theatre Aquarius, where he played Tony in a production of West Side Story.

He graduated from the theatre program at George Brown College in 1996.

== Career ==
Buliung played the lead role of Joe Schofield in the Royal Manitoba Theatre Centre/Canadian Stage production of Chimerica in 2016.

He has also had occasional supporting roles in film and television, most notably as Professor Warren in The Best Years, Michael Braxton in Bitten and Robert Hobbie in Holly Hobbie. Evan also gave his voice to various video game characters, his most famous work is portrayal of Holden Cross and his multiplayer counterpart Lawbringer in For Honor in 2017. He later reprised his role as a stand-alone DLC character, Gryphon, in 2020.

He was a Dora Mavor Moore Award nominee for Best Actor in a Musical in 2013 for Bloodless, and was a Canadian Screen Award nominee for Best Lead Actor in a Television Film or Miniseries at the 5th Canadian Screen Awards in 2017 for CBC Television's film of Pericles.

In 2018, he won a Dora Mavor Moore Award for his performance as Bruce Bechdel in Fun Home at the Panasonic Theatre (2018).

In 2019, he played Larry Murphy in the Canada premiere of Dear Evan Hansen, and in 2023, he starred as Pierre Bezukhov in the Canada premiere of Natasha, Pierre & The Great Comet of 1812.

Other roles he's played include Sky Masterson in Guys and Dollsand Mercutio in Romeo and Juliet at the Stratford Festival (2017) and Georges Seurat in Sunday in the Park with George with the Eclipse Theatre Company (2020).

In 2025, he reprised the role of Pierre in Natasha, Pierre & The Great Comet of 1812 at the Royal Alexandra Theatre in Toronto, Ontario.

== Filmography ==
=== Film ===
| Year | Title | Role | Notes |
|---|---|---|---|
| 2013 | Skating to New York | Dr. David Janeau | |
| 2015 | King Lear | Edgar | |
| 2016 | Stratford Festival: The Adventures of Pericles | Pericles | |
| 2018 | Romeo and Juliet | Mercutio | |
| 2021 | The Wolf and the Lion | Allan | |
| 2024 | We Forgot to Break Up | Gary | |
| 2025 | Youngblood | Ervin | |

=== Television ===
| Year | Title | Role | Notes |
|---|---|---|---|
| 2004 | Elizabeth Rex | Matt | Television film |
| 2007 | The Best Years | Professor Warren | 4 episodes |
| 2012 | Warehouse 13 | Johann Steinbrück | Episode: "We All Fall Down" |
| 2012 | Nikita | Davis Kellog | Episode: "3.0" |
| 2012 | Copper | Edwin Booth | 2 episodes |
| 2012 | Haven | Chaz | Episode: "Reunion" |
| 2013 | Dangerous Persuasions | Jim Ellison | Episode: "Highway to Hate" |
| 2013 | The Listener | Mark Douglas / Mike Sexton | Episode: "Cold Storage" |
| 2014 | Bitten | Michael Braxton | 4 episodes |
| 2014 | Reign | Maurice Bisset | Episode: "Royal Blood" |
| 2016 | Saving Hope | Russ | Episode: "Not Fade Away" |
| 2016 | Gangland Undercover | Casey | 2 episodes |
| 2017 | Damnation | Colby | Episode: "Sam Riley's Body" |
| 2018–2021 | Holly Hobbie | Robert / Peter Hobbie | 29 episodes |
| 2019 | Suits | Simon Lowe | 2 episodes |
| 2019 | A Very Country Wedding | Mike | Television film |
| 2019 | Departure | Derek | 3 episodes |
| 2020 | Transplant | Adam | Episode: "Relapse" |
| 2021 | Hudson & Rex | Randy Sher | Episode: "All in the Litter" |
| 2022 | Ruby and the Well | Doug Byrne | Episode: "I Wish They Would Just Listen" |

== Awards and nominations ==
| Year | Award | Category | Nominated work | Result | Ref. |
|---|---|---|---|---|---|
| 2006 | Dora Awards | Outstanding Performance in a Featured Role in a Play or Musical | Lord of the Rings | Nominated | |
| 2013 | Dora Awards | Outstanding Performance by a Male in a Musical | Bloodless: The Trial of Burke and Hare | Nominated | |
| 2017 | Canadian Screen Awards | Best Performance by an Actor in a Leading Role in a Dramatic Program or Limited Series | The Adventures of Pericles | Nominated | |
| 2018 | Dora Awards | Outstanding Performance by a Male in a Musical | Fun Home | Won | |
| 2021 | Canadian Screen Awards | Best Supporting Actor in a Drama Series | Departure | Nominated | |
| 2024 | Dora Awards | Outstanding Performance by an Individual in a Musical | Natasha, Pierre & The Great Comet of 1812 | Nominated | |
