= Black Flag (Machine Gun Kelly mixtape) =

Mixtape by Machine Gun Kelly
- Released: June 26, 2013
- Recorded: 2012–13
- Genre: Hip hop
- Length: 47:35
- Label: EST 19XX; Bad Boy
- Producer: JP Did This 1; Slim Gudz; Burd N Keys; TrapMoneyBenny; Dre$ki; Brian Empire; LT Moe; Chizzy; Mike Bass; Sarah J; Cameron Mizell; Skewby; Ricky G; Karbon

Machine Gun Kelly chronology
Lace Up (2012)	Black Flag (2013)	Fuck It (2015)

Singles from Black Flag
- 1. "Skate Cans" Released: March 28, 2013; 2. "Pe$o" Released: May 22, 2013; 3. "Breaking News" Released: June 25, 2013; 4. "Black Tuxedos" Released: July 16, 2013; 5. "Mind of a Stoner" Released: February 10, 2014

Black Flag is the seventh mixtape by American rapper MGK; it was released on June 26, 2013. The mixtape is supported by five singles; "Skate Cans", "Pe$o", "Breaking News", "Black Tuxedos" and "Mind of a Stoner" featuring Wiz Khalifa.

== Background ==
On January 28, 2013, MGK announced he would be releasing a new mixtape soon. On February 18, the cover art was released along with the title, Black Flag. MGK would later reveal that Pusha T, Kellin Quinn, Dub-O, Meek Mill, French Montana, and Wiz Khalifa would be featured on the project. In response to questions about the mixtape, MGK would tweet: "Black Flag is not a mixtape, it's an album we're giving away for free". On June 4, MGK posted a picture of a letter reading:

"This project is dedicated to love, because for my entire life it has been taken from me. Granted, when it was given, I pushed it right back. I couldn't handle it. This was until I experienced the loss of love for what I love doing most: music. That was the one thing worth fighting for, even more-so than the love of my father. I've found that love again. And I plan on never surrendering it. Find what you love and fight!! Black Flag (sic)"

== Promotion and release ==
On February 18, 2013, Machine Gun Kelly released the song titled "Champions" as a thank you to the fans, the song was not included on Black Flag. On March 28, the music video for the song "Skate Cans" was released. The mixtape was initially going to be released within a month of April near his birthday, but it was eventually pushed back. On May 22, the first official single from Black Flag, "Pe$o" featuring rappers Pusha T and Meek Mill was released. On June 4, Machine Gun Kelly released a statement regarding the concept behind Black Flag and would later activate a countdown clock on his website that would release new content from Black Flag such as the album booklet, song previews, and even Black Flag itself; each time it struck zero. The clock counted down eleven times, with each countdown period being named "Operation:.....". On June 25, the "Operation: Complex Catastrophe" countdown hit zero and Machine Gun Kelly released a new track titled "Breaking News" along with an accompanying music video onto YouTube. The next day, Black Flag was released through the "Operation: Weapon Of Mass Destruction" countdown. Shortly after the release, Machine Gun Kelly would tweet: "To media and to fans: Black Flag is my 2nd ALBUM, please consider it and treat it as such." Physical copies of the project will be available in limited quantities on Machine Gun Kelly's upcoming tour in promotion of Black Flag. On June 27, Machine Gun Kelly personally uploaded, edited, and commented on the lyrics for all the songs featured on Black Flag for the website Genius.com. The final countdown, "Operation: Unconventional Warfare" struck zero on July 16 and released a music video for "Black Tuxedo". The countdown clock has since been removed.

Black Flag included a cover of "Swing Life Away". The cover has new verses written by Kelly, and features guest vocals by Kellin Quinn of Sleeping with Sirens. Rise Against approved of the cover, after Kelly wrote a letter to the band explaining that he "wouldn’t do anything to make them or their song look corny". Originally, Quinn had recorded vocals for an acoustic rendition, but Kelly decided against this, insisting that the cover be more melodic rock.

== Track listing ==
No.	Title	Producer(s)	Length
1.	"Raise the Flag"	Slim Gudz	3:06
2.	"Breaking News"	JP Did This 1	2:58
3.	"Pe$o" (featuring Pusha T and Meek Mill)	Burd & Keyz	3:14
4.	"Black Tuxedo" (featuring Tezo)	TrapMoneyBenny	2:32
5.	"Mind of a Stoner" (featuring Wiz Khalifa)	Dre$ki, Brian Empire	2:49
6.	"D&G" (featuring Sean McGee)	JP Did This 1	4:43
7.	"Skate Cans"	LT Moe	3:01
8.	"50 (Interlude)" (featuring French Montana)	Burd & Keyz	3:28
9.	"Baddest"	Chizzy, Mike Bass, Sarah J	3:30
10.	"Miss Me?" (featuring Dub-O)	Dre$ki	3:16
11.	"Street Dreams"	Slim Gudz	2:53
12.	"Swing Life Away" (Rise Against cover, featuring Kellin Quinn)	Cameron Mizell	3:21
13.	"Home Soon"	Skewby, Ricky G	3:47
14.	"Dark Side of the Moon"	Karbon	4:58
Total length:			47:35

Samples credits

- "Raise The Flag" contains a sample of "Shake It Out" performed by Florence and the Machine
- "Mind of a Stoner" contains a lyrical interpolation of "Bitch, Don't Kill My Vibe" performed by Kendrick Lamar.
- "Miss Me?" contains a sample of "Miss Me" performed by Drake
- "Swing Life Away" is a partial cover of "Swing Life Away" performed by punk rock band Rise Against.
- "Pe$o" features a sample of "I Need a Dollar" performed by Aloe Blacc.
