= Kyle Rideout =

Canadian actor

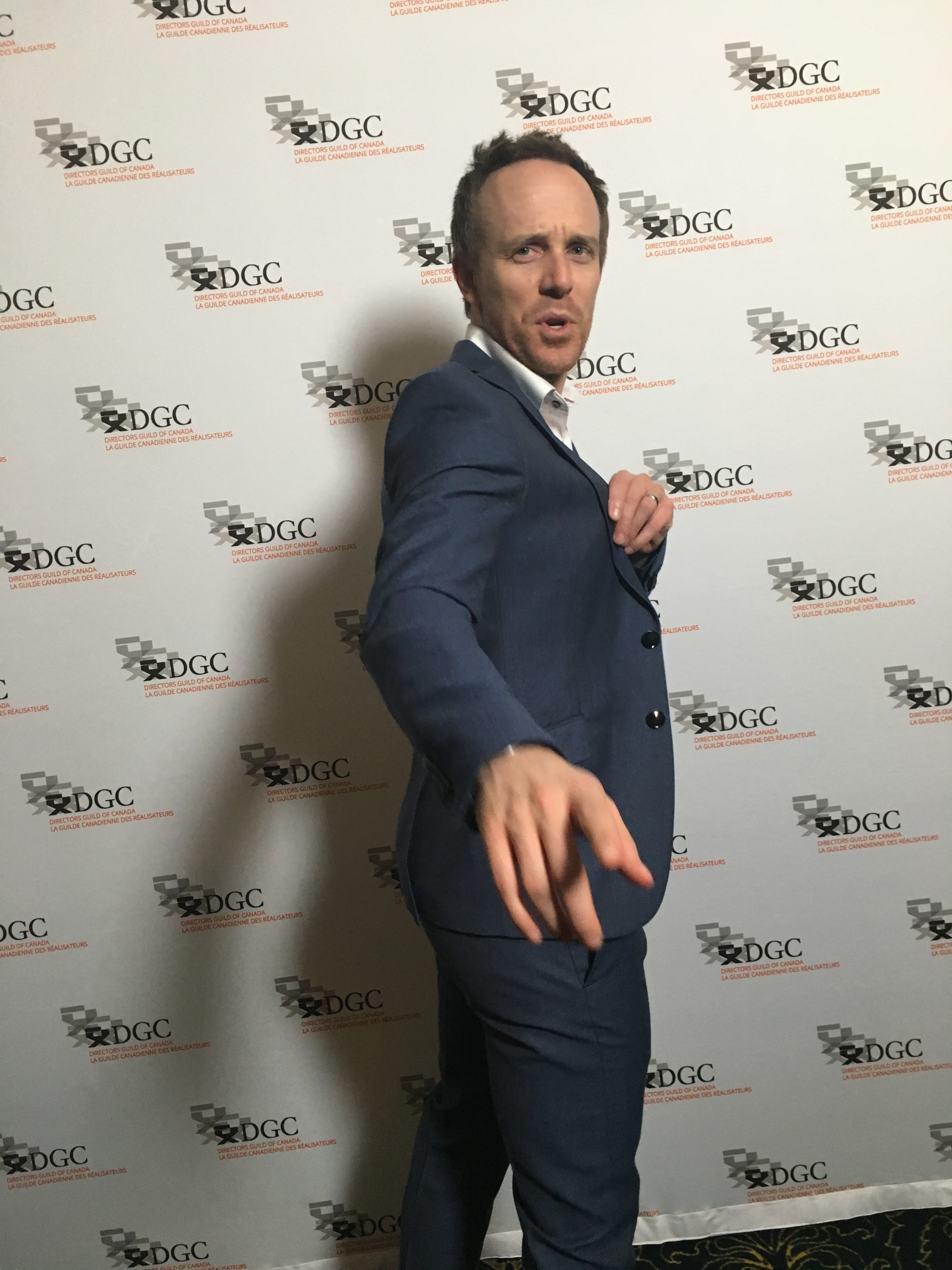
- Rideout in 2018
- Born: Vancouver, British Columbia, Canada
- Education: Canadian Film Centre
- Occupations: Actor; writer; director
- Years active: 2004–present

Kyle Rideout is a Canadian actor. He co-owns a production company called Motion 58 with business partner Josh Epstein. He co-wrote and directed the short films Hop the Twig and Wait for Rain as well as the feature films Eadweard and Adventures in Public School. Rideout's film have garnered a nomination for the Directors Guild of Canada's DGC Discovery Award in 2017 for Adventures in Public School.

== Career ==
As an actor, Rideout won a Jessie Richardson Theatre Award as Best Newcomer in 2005, for his performance in a production of Josh MacDonald's play Halo. The following year, he won the award for Best Supporting Actor, Small Theatre Division, for his performance as Gordon in David McGillivray and Walter Zerlin's The Farndale Avenue Housing Estate Townswomen's Guild Dramatic Society Production of A Christmas Carol. In 2007, he starred as Romeo in Bard on the Beach's production of Romeo and Juliet.

In 2010, he appeared in Studies in Motion: The Hauntings of Eadweard Muybridge; Eadweard Muybridge, the subject of that play, would also become the subject of Eadweard the film. He also appeared in Minecraft Mini Series as Durango.

Rideout has also had guest roles in Da Vinci's Inquest and Supernatural, and voice roles in Packages from Planet X, Littlest Pet Shop, My Little Pony: Friendship Is Magic, and the English language edition of The Story of Saiunkoku.

== Filmography ==
=== Film ===
Year	Film	Role	Notes
2006	The Girl Who Leapt Through Time	Additional voices	English dub
2007	Sword of the Stranger	Feng-Wu	English dub
2010	Hop the Twig	Woodsman	
2013	Barbie and the Pink Shoes	Hilarion / Ballet Scout #2 (voice)	
2013	Lawrence & Holloman	Gravy Lovin' Co-Worker	
2015	Eadweard	Leapfrogger Jack	
2015	Elves: Unite the Magic	Farran / Johnny Baker (voice)	
2015	The Unauthorized Beverly Hills, 90210 Story	Editor	
2016	Deadpool	Super Soldier #1	
2016	Boy Attic	Ed Brinson	
2016	Warcraft	Officer	
2017	Adventures in Public School	—N/a	Director
2025	Youngblood	—N/a	Screenwriter with Josh Epstein, Seneca Aaron and Charles Officer

=== Television ===
Year	Television	Voice	Notes
2004	Da Vinci's Inquest	Mike	Episode: "There's a Story Goes Along with This"
2007–2008	The Story of Saiunkoku	Kokajun Sa	Voice
2012–2016	Littlest Pet Shop	Vinnie Terrio, additional voices	Voice
2013–2014	Packages from Planet X	Terrance Buckshot	
2014	Supernatural	Prisoner in closet	
2014	Pac-Man and the Ghostly Adventures	Danny Vainglory	Episode: "Pac-Mania"
2015	Lego Elves	Farran Leafshade, Johnny Baker	
2016	Dinotrux	Crunk, Ankylodumps	Episode: "Cementasaurs"
2016	Legends of Tomorrow	Stein's father	Episode: "Last Refuge"
2016–2019	Ready Jet Go!	Carrot, various voices	
2016–2019	My Little Pony: Friendship Is Magic	Thorax, various voices	Voice
2016–2018	Beat Bugs	Ants, Franken-Legs	
2017	iZombie	Alpha Dale	Episode: "Eat a Knievel"
2017	The Arrangement	Connor	
2018	Littlest Pet Shop: A World of Our Own	Quincy, various voices	Voice
2019	The Bravest Knight	Itty Bitty Yeti	Episode: "Cedric & the Cave"
2020–2021	My Little Pony: Pony Life	Dishwater Slog	Voice
2021	Catch! Teenieping	Freezeping	Voice; Episode "The Coolest Friendship"
2023	The Good Doctor	Bob Wachowski	Episode: "365 Degrees"
2023	Psi Cops	Rich Jerk 2	Episode: "Illuminaughty"
2025	Happy Face	Brendan	Episode: "Controlled Burn"
