= Žeželj =

Žeželj is a South Slavic surname.

== People ==
- Danijel Žeželj (born 1966), Croatian comic book artist
- Dražen Žeželj (born 1976), Slovenian footballer
- Petar Žeželj (1965–2009), Canadian ice hockey player

== See also ==
- Zezel
