= Tempted (Jazz Cartier song) =

Single by Jazz Cartier

from the album Fleurever
- Released: January 6, 2017
- Recorded: 2016
- Genre: Hip hop
- Length: 3:45
- Label: Universal Music Canada
- Songwriters: Jahmarie Adams; Tyler Williams; Michael Lantz; Sean Fischer
- Producers: T-Minus; Lantz; Fischer

Jazz Cartier singles chronology
"Pree" (2016)	"Tempted" (2017)	"How Did I Get This Deep?" (2017)

Music video
- "Tempted" on YouTube

"Tempted" is a song by Canadian rapper Jazz Cartier. It was released on January 6, 2017, as the lead single from his debut studio album, Fleurever. The song was produced by T-Minus and Lantz, with additional production by Sean Fischer.

== Background and release ==
The song premiered on Zane Lowe's Beats 1 Radio on January 3, 2017, on Apple Music, but was released for digital download as a single on iTunes on January 6, 2017. "Tempted" is the lead single from his debut album, Fleurever.

== Music video ==
The music video was released on May 5, 2017, on Jazz Cartier's Vevo account on YouTube.

== Commercial performance ==
"Tempted" debuted at number 91 on Canadian Hot 100 for the chart dated February 4, 2017. The song became his first chart entry on the chart and his most successful one to date.

== Cultural crossover ==
A brief clip from the "Tempted" video was used in the TV version of The Cuckoo's Calling to represent the work of character Deeby Macc, who otherwise doesn't appear on screen.

== Charts ==
Chart (2017)	Peak position
Canada (Canadian Hot 100)	91

== Release history ==
Region	Date	Format	Label
Worldwide	January 6, 2017	Digital download	Self-released
