= Eadweard (film) =

2015 Canadian drama film

- Directed by: Kyle Rideout
- Written by: Kyle Rideout
- Produced by: Josh Epstein
- Starring: Michael Eklund; Sara Canning; Christopher Heyerdahl; Charlie Carrick; Jodi Balfour; Torrance Coombs; Jonathon Young; Birkett Turton; William Vaughan
- Cinematography: Tony Mirza
- Edited by: Elisabeth Olga Tremblay
- Music by: Anna Atkinson; Andrew Penner
- Production companies: Eadweard Pictures; Motion 58 Entertainment
- Distributed by: GEM Entertainment
- Release date: February 6, 2015 (Berlinale)
- Running time: 104 minutes
- Country: Canada
- Language: English

Eadweard is a 2015 Canadian drama film written and directed by Kyle Rideout and written and produced by Josh Epstein. The film, a psychological drama, stars Michael Eklund as photographer Eadweard Muybridge. The film's Canadian premiere was at the Vancouver International Film Festival in Vancouver, British Columbia on October 2, 2015.

== Plot ==
A psychological drama centered around world-famous turn-of-the-century photographer, Eadweard Muybridge who photographed nude and deformed subjects, became the godfather of cinema, murdered his wife's lover, and was the last person to receive the justifiable homicide verdict.

== Cast ==
- Michael Eklund as Eadweard Muybridge
- Sara Canning as Flora
- Christopher Heyerdahl as Pepper
- Charlie Carrick as Harry Larkyns
- Jodi Balfour as Mary
- Torrance Coombs as Bell
- Jonathon Young as Eakins
- Birkett Turton as Rondinella (as Kett Turton)
- William Vaughan as J. Liberty Tadd (as William C. Vaughan)
- Ian Tracey as Stanford
- Jordana Largy as Susan
- Josh Epstein as Edison
- Aleks Paunovic as Blacksmith
- Jay Brazeau as MC
- Andrew McIlroy as Dr. Decrum

== Production ==
The film began shooting around Greater Vancouver in July 2013.

== Release ==
Aside from screening at various film festivals, the film had a successful theatrical run in several Canadian cities.

Rideout and Epstein, actors, had previously appeared in a stage play depicting Muybridge's life, Studies in Motion — the Hauntings of Eadweard Muybridge.

== Awards and accolades ==
At the 4th Canadian Screen Awards, Rideout and cowriter Josh Epstein garnered a nomination for Best Adapted Screenplay.

At the 2015 Leo Awards, Eadweard received a leading 15 nominations and won in the following categories:

- Best Production Design (Kyle Rideout),
- Best Costume Design (Florence Barrett),
- Best Make-Up (Kathy Howatt),
- Best Hairstyling (Darcy Burns), and
- Best Supporting Performance by a Male (Christopher Heyerdahl).

At the 2015 UBCP Awards, Michael Eklund won best actor award for his portrayal of Eadweard, whilst Sara Canning was nominated for best actress.

At the Maui Film Festival, Eadweard won the audience award in the Narrative Independent Feature category.

At the 2015 Nashville Film Festival, Eadweard won the Audience Award in the Narrative Competition category, and also the Special Jury Prize for Cinematography (awarded to Tony Mirza)

At the 2015 FLICKERS: Rhode Island International Film Festival, Eadweard won first prize (i.e. second place) in the Audience Choice Awards, Best Feature category.

At the 2015 Alhambra Film Festival, Michael Eklund won best actor. At the 2015 Cape Cod International Film Festival Eadweard won best picture.

== See also ==
- Eadweard Muybridge, Zoopraxographer
