= Andrew McNee =

Canadian actor

- Born: December 25, 1974 (age 51); Vancouver, British Columbia, Canada
- Education: Studio 58
- Occupation: Actor
- Years active: 2001–present

Andrew McNee (born December 25, 1974) is a Canadian actor, best known for his roles as Coach Eduardo Malone in the Diary of a Wimpy Kid film series and Hoss in Scary Movie 4. He graduated from University Hill Secondary School in 1992 and Studio 58 in 2001.

== Filmography ==
=== Film ===
Year	Title	Role	Notes
2003	The Delicate Art of Parking	Gus Morski	
2006	Firewall	Doorman	
2006	Scary Movie 4	Hoss	
2008	Christmas Cottage	Pastor Richardson	
2010	Diary of a Wimpy Kid	Coach Eduardo Malone	
2010	Ramona and Beezus	Mr. Clay	
2011	Normal	Ray	
2011	Diary of a Wimpy Kid: Rodrick Rules	Coach Eduardo Malone	
2012	Diary of a Wimpy Kid: Dog Days	Coach Eduardo Malone	
2016	Grand Unified Theory	Victor	
2016	Aim for the Roses	Ken Carter	
2017	My Little Pony: The Movie	Canterlot & Klugetown featured voices	
2017	Tinder Mercies	Jack	Short film
2017	Adventures in Public School	Mr. Kelly	
2018	Blurt	Jeremy's Dad	
2021	Attic Trunk	Jason	
2021	Imperfect High	Mr. Arnet	
2022	LEGO Friends Heartlake Stories: Plight of the Bumblebee	Daniel (voice)	
2024	Capsule	Yuri	Short film
2025	Eternity	Panicked Man	
2026	Love and Money	Andrew	

=== Television ===
Year	Title	Role	Notes
2004	The Chris Isaak Show	Vendor	Episode: "The Little Mermaid"
2006	The L Word	Brian	Episode: "Lifeline"
2006	Stargate SG-1	Technician	Episode: "Arthur's Mantle"
2006	Kyle XY	Radiologist	Episode: "Pilot"
2010	Psych	Ritch Renaud	Episode: "Dead Bear Walking"
2011-17	Supernatural	Rick/Deputy #2	2 episodes
2011	Hellcats	Film School Teacher	Episode: "Woke Up Dead"
2011	Hiccups	Dennis	Episode: "Moving Pictures"
2011	Eureka	Huggins	Episode: "Clash of the Titans"
2011	Deck the Halls	Stan Brooks	TV film
2016	Sunnyhearts Community Centre	Gym Grunter	1 episode
2017	Supergirl	Joe	Episode: "Ace Reporter"
2018	My Little Pony: Friendship Is Magic	Organic Baker, Mail Pony (voice)	Episode: "The Parent Map"
2018	Mega Man: Fully Charged	Drill Man, Elec Man (voice)	
2018	My Little Pony: Friendship Is Magic	Announcer Pony, Short Fuse, Organic Baker, Mail Pony (voice)	2 episodes
2019	The Magicians	Gym Teacher	Episode: "Escape from the Happy Place"
2019	Dinosaur Train	Drew, Head Palaeontologist, Mayor (voice)	2 episodes
2020	Dorg Van Dango	RD (voice)	51 episodes
2020	My Little Pony: Pony Life	Bubbles Cherub McSquee	Episode: "Cute-Pocalypse Meow"
2020	Novelmore	Tyragon, Crazy Calvin (voice)	5 episodes
2020	Ninjago	Chancellor Gulch (voice)	4 episodes
2020	The Hollow	Davis, Adam's Dad (voice)	2 episodes
2021	Gabby Duran & the Unsittables	Bro (voice)	Episode: "A Song of Gabby & Susie"
2021	Batwoman	Jackson Charles	Episode: "Arrive Alive"
2022	Ninjago: The Virtues of Spinjitzu	Chancellor Gulch (voice)	Episode: "Generosity"
2023	A Million Little Things	Graham	Episode: "A Bird in the Hand"
2023-25	Ninjago: Dragons Rising	Mr. Frohicky, Partygoer, Chancellor Gulch (voice)	21 episodes

== Awards and nominations ==
Year	Association	Category	Work	Result	Ref.
2018	Leo Awards	Best Supporting Performance by a Male in a Motion Picture	Adventures in Public School	Nominated	
2018	UBCP/ACTRA Awards	Best Actor	Adventures in Public School	Nominated	
2020	Leo Awards	Best Performance in an Animation Program or Series	Dorg Van Dango	Nominated	
2022	Leo Awards	Best Lead Performance by a Male in a Motion Picture	Attic Trunk	Nominated	
