= Fleurever =

Studio album by Jazz Cartier
- Released: July 27, 2018
- Genre: Hip hop
- Length: 45:35
- Label: Universal Music Canada
- Producer: 4th Pyramid; Abaz; Ahkilo; Burd & Keyz; Catch Carter; Cubeatz; Daniel Worthy; DZL; Gravez; Jordon Manswell; Krinny; KTOE; Lantz; Lynxz; Mathaius Young; Mikhail; Path Seven; Rojas; Ryan Hemsworth; Sean Fischer; Steelo Foreign; T-Minus; Win Crabtree; WondaGurl; Xavi; X-Plosive; Zale; ZepFire

Jazz Cartier chronology
Hotel Paranoia (2016)	Fleurever (2018)

Singles from Fleurever
- 1. "Tempted" Released: January 6, 2017; 2. "Right Now" Released: April 6, 2018; 3. "Godflower" Released: May 18, 2018; 4. "Which One" Released: June 22, 2018

Fleurever is the debut studio album by Canadian rapper Jazz Cartier. It was released on July 27, 2018, by Universal Music Canada. The deluxe edition was released on November 9, 2018.

== Background ==
The album was announced back in December 2016. In an interview with Billboard about the album title, Cartier said that:

It comes from my nickname in French, which is fleur. Essentially, in my head, or in my world, it’s the flower that will live forever. It will just never die. It just has so much energy from everybody for years to come, and it’s my take on that.

In another interview with Billboard about the idea of duality on the album: Cartier said:

I just find that duality is a constant thing that everyone goes through. But I think more so myself because of like how I was raised and where I was raised and things I've been going through. Even with all the success and everything happening like you know what a lot of shit changes in your life and people talk about cliches but cliches are cliches for a reason. You go through all of them and you just find yourself looking in the mirror and being like there's some things I have to adjust to make sure this thing doesn't happen again or just learning from certain mistakes and that's the constant struggle with me and duality.

== Promotion ==
=== Singles ===
The album's lead single, "Tempted", was released for digital download on January 6, 2017. The music video was released on May 5, 2017. The song was produced by Lantz and T-Minus, with additional production by Sean Fischer and peaked at number 91 on the Canadian Hot 100 chart, becoming his highest charting single.

The album's second single, "Right Now" featuring KTOE, was released on April 6, 2018, alone with an accompanied music video six days later.

The album's third single, "Godflower", was released for digital download on May 18, 2018, alone with an accompanied music video six days later.

"Which One" was released on June 22, 2018, as the album's fourth single. The music video was released on July 6, 2018.

=== Other songs ===
The music video for "Cuzzi Relax", was released on March 18, 2019. The music video was directed by Brilliant Garcia.

== Critical reception ==
Professional ratings
Review scores
Source	Rating
Exclaim!	9/10
HipHopDX	4/5
Now	3/5 Ns

Fleurever received generally positive reviews from critics. Riley Wallace of Exclaim! praised the album, writing: "He's in a whole different mind state, and it comes across in the eclectic, yet remarkably cohesive track list. The "something to prove" chip on his shoulder seems to have been replaced with thoughtful reflection and developed songwriting." Scott Glaysher of HipHopDX said, "As impressive as Fleurever’s introspection is, the album isn’t all just rhymes from his deep dark diary. There are plenty of turn-up moments that bode strong production and even stronger songwriting." Kevin Ritchie of Now said, "Fleurever is the MC’s most cohesive album to date: it’s all about hooky flows and hard, trap drums tuned for maximal impact on club systems, but undercut by streaks of melodic melancholy."

== Track listing ==
Credits were adapted from Tidal.

No.	Title	Writer(s)	Producer(s)	Length
1.	"Soul Searcher"	Jahmarie Adams; Michael Lantz	Lantz	2:04
2.	"Security"	Adams; Lantz; Andrew Liburd; Ryan Hemsworth; Jordon Manswell; Sean Fischer	Lantz; Burd & Keyz; Hemsworth; Manswell; Fischer	2:56
3.	"VVS" (featuring KTOE)	Adams; Khan Edwards; Ebony Oshunrinde; Kevin Gomringer; Tim Gomringer	WondaGurl; Cubeatz	2:52
4.	"Gliss"	Adams; Adam Farag; Mikhail Cronin	4th Pyramid; Mikhail	3:06
5.	"Function" (featuring BLK LT$)	Adams; Christopher Justice	Gravez	3:23
6.	"Right Now" (featuring KTOE)	Adams; Edwards; Lantz	KTOE; Lantz	2:22
7.	"Talk 2"	Adams; Matthew Krinberg	Krinny	2:47
8.	"IDWFIL"	Adams; Norbert Krecsko; Fischer; Nickolas Palet; Kali Uchis; Jorja Smith; Mark Spears; Larrance Dopson; Jairus Mozee	Catch Carter; Fischer; ZepFire	3:07
9.	"Sex Machina"	Adams; Edwards; Winfred Crabtree; Dante Jones	KTOE; Win Crabtree	3:14
10.	"Distractions"	Adams; Michael Holmes; Zale Epstein	DZL; Zale	3:20
11.	"Godflower"	Adams; Krinberg	Krinny; Path Seven	3:00
12.	"Fencing with Flowers"	Adams; Krinberg	Krinny; Path Seven	0:55
13.	"Which One"	Adams; Holmes; Imran Abbas; Thomas Kessler	DZL; X-Plosive; Abaz	2:02
14.	"Xrta Terrestrial"	Adams; Deshawn Levy-George	Ahkilo	3:23
15.	"Before It's Too Late"	Adams; Levy-George; Daniel Smith	Ahkilo; Daniel Worthy	3:24
16.	"Tempted"	Adams; Tyler Williams; Lantz; Fisher	T-Minus; Lantz; Fisher	3:42
Total length:				45:35

Fleurever – Delxue edition
No.	Title	Writer(s)	Producer(s)	Length
17.	"Cuzzi Relax"	Adams; Christian Taylor; Kawen Simpson	Mathaius Young; Lynxz	2:34
18.	"Mitsubishi"	Adams; Christopher Auld	Steelo Foreign	2:58
19.	"Castlevania"	Adams; Danilo Herrera; Cristian Rojas	Xavi; Rojas	2:27
20.	"No Way Out"	Adams; Lantz	Lantz	2:31
Total length:				56:07

Notes

- All tracks stylized in all caps, with a bullet in front of each tracks. For example, "Soul Searcher" is stylized as "• SOUL SEARCHER".

Sample credits

- "IDWFIL" contains a sample of "Tyrant", written and performed by Kali Uchis and Jorja Smith.

== Charts ==
Chart (2018)	Peak position
Canadian Albums (Billboard)	70
