= George Finn (ice hockey) =

Canadian actor and ice hockey player

- Born: February 22, 1963 (age 63); Etobicoke, Ontario, Canada
- Occupation: Actor
- Years active: 1981–1986

George J. Finn (born February 22, 1963) is a Canadian former actor and former professional ice hockey player. Finn is most famous for playing the role of Carl Racki in the 1986 film Youngblood. Finn also spent four years in the major junior Ontario Hockey League, splitting time between the Belleville Bulls, Sault Ste. Marie Greyhounds, and Windsor Spitfires.

== Filmography ==
=== Film ===
Year	Title	Role	Notes
1981	The Dozens	extra	independent film
1986	Youngblood	Carl Racki	billed as George J. Finn
