= Ashton James =

Saint Lucian-Canadian actor

Ashton James is a Saint Lucian-Canadian actor based in Toronto, Ontario. He is best known for his leading roles in the films Boxcutter and Youngblood.

In 2023, he received a Canadian Screen Award nomination for Best Supporting Performance in a Web Program or Series at the 11th Canadian Screen Awards, for his role as Taye Blak in the web series Revenge of the Black Best Friend.
