= Jazz Cartier =

Canadian musician

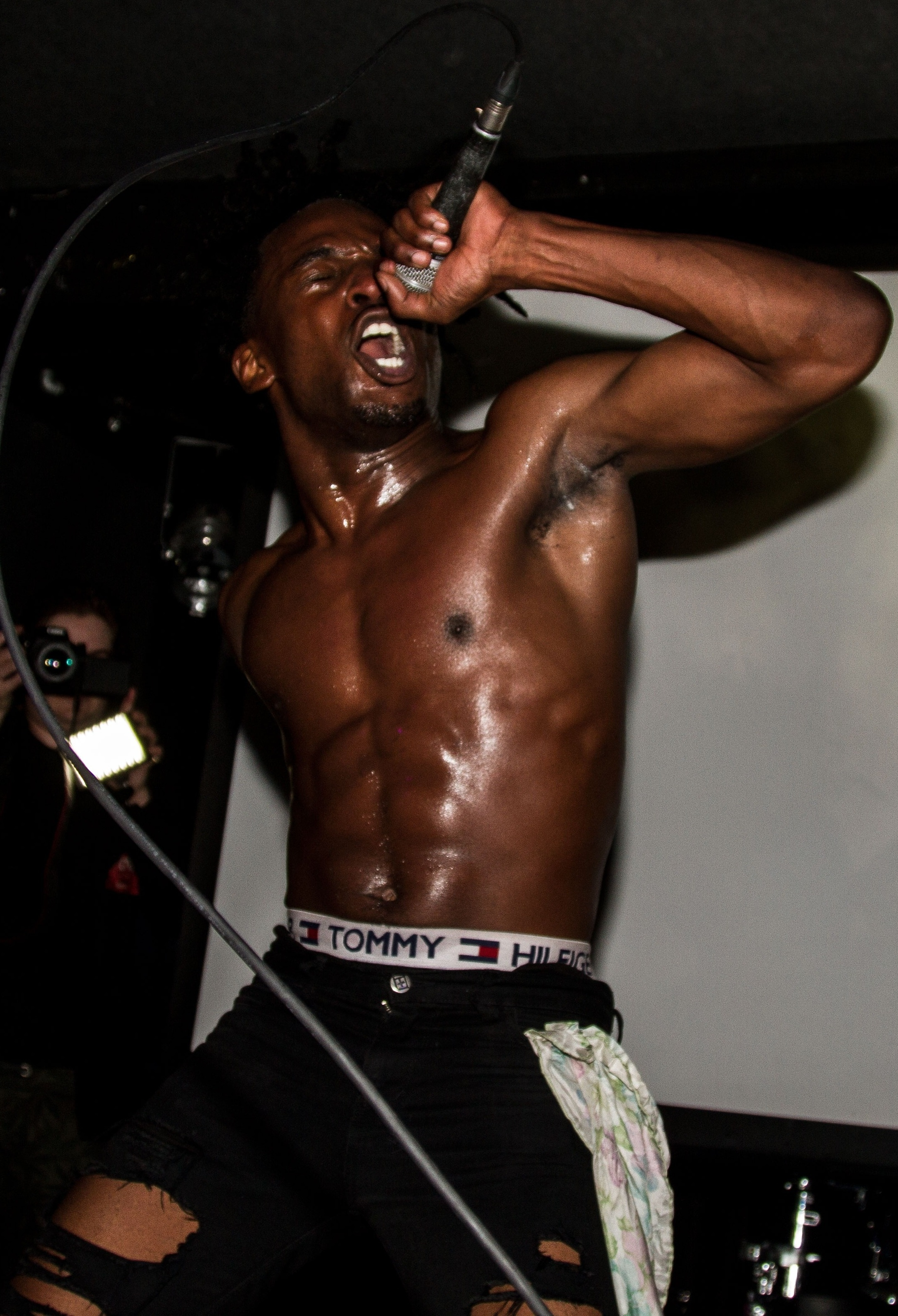
- Cartier in 2015

Background information
- Also known as: Jacuzzi LaFleur
- Born: Jahmarie Wishart Adams; March 19, 1993 (age 33); Toronto, Ontario, Canada
- Genre: Hip hop
- Occupations: Rapper; singer; songwriter
- Instrument: Vocals
- Years active: 2010–present
- Labels: Universal Music Canada; Capitol (former)
- Website: Archived official website at the Wayback Machine (archive index)

Jahmarie Wishart Adams (born March 19, 1993), known professionally as Jazz Cartier, is a Canadian rapper, singer, and songwriter. He is best known for his mixtapes: Marauding in Paradise and Hotel Paranoia.

He has twice been a long listed nominee for the Polaris Music Prize, in 2015 for Marauding in Paradise, and 2016 for Hotel Paranoia, and won the Juno Award for Rap Recording of the Year at the Juno Awards of 2017 for Hotel Paranoia. He released his debut studio album Fleurever in July 2018.

== Early life ==
Jahmarie Wishart Adams was born on March 19, 1993, in Toronto, Ontario to an African-Caribbean family. His stepfather worked as a diplomat for the U.S. State Department, which made him move around frequently in childhood with his family, living in different countries around various times in the United States, Barbados and Kuwait attending 13 boarding schools. He credits the different types of music he was exposed to in these locations as all having had an influence on his own style as a hip-hop musician. Cartier spent majority of his high school career at Avon Old Farms, a prestigious all-male boarding school located in Connecticut, and graduated after transferring to another prep school, the Blue Ridge School located in St. George, Virginia. He then spent a postgraduate year at Bridgton Academy in North Bridgton, ME after completing high school.

He was accepted to an art program at Columbia College Chicago in 2012 but, reluctant to move to a new city where he knew no one, he returned to Toronto.

== Musical career ==
In 2013 the Get Home Safe Crew was formed in Toronto with 88Glam members Drew Howard & Derek Wise. They met through the city's nightlife scene and eventually moving into together in the Kensington Market neighbourhood.

Cartier had worked on an early version of his debut mixtape, Marauding in Paradise, in 2011, but was not satisfied with the tape. After moving back to Toronto, he began working with record producer Lantz after originally meeting in 2009 at a studio when Cartier was 16 years old. They released the song "Set Fire" in 2014. Performing in Toronto-area music venues, he quickly attracted attention — his track "Switch" was regularly played at Toronto Raptors games by team DJ 4Korners, and at a Toronto Red Bull Sound Select show in March 2015 he was introduced by rapper Kardinal Offishall.

Cartier's debut mixtape, Marauding in Paradise, was released on April 15, 2015. The mixtape was supported by three singles: "Switch", "New Religion" and "Dead or Alive".

Cartier's second mixtape, Hotel Paranoia, was released in February 2016 and was supported by the singles: "Stick & Move" and "I Know". On February 23, Cartier was announced as one of the performers at the 2016 Osheaga Festival.

He was a shortlisted nominee for the 2016 SOCAN Songwriting Prize for his track "Dead or Alive". In 2017 he won a Juno Award for his mixtape Hotel Paranoia.

Cartier later announced that his next project following Hotel Paranoia would be titled Fleurever on December 16, 2016. Cartier released the lead single from the album titled, "Tempted" on January 6, 2017. The song peaked at number 91 on the Canadian Hot 100 chart, which became his highest and only charting single to date. Cartier later released the singles "Right Now", "Godflower" and "Which One" as singles from the album in 2018. Fleurever was released on July 27, 2018, and debuted at number 70 on the Canadian Albums Chart.

== Discography ==
=== Studio albums ===
List of studio albums, with selected details
Title	Album details	Peak chart positions
Title	Album details	CAN
Fleurever	Released: July 27, 2018; Label: Universal Music Canada; Format: Digital download, streaming	70
The Fleur Print	Released: September 10, 2021; Label: Self-released; Format: Digital download, streaming	TBA
The Fleur Print (Vol.2)	Released: February 25, 2022; Label: Self-released; Format: Digital download, streaming	

=== Mixtapes ===
List of mixtapes, with selected details
Title	Details
Marauding in Paradise	Released: April 15, 2015; Label: Self-released; Format: Digital download, streaming
Hotel Paranoia	Released: February 1, 2016; Label: Universal Music Canada; Format: Digital download, streaming

=== Singles ===
==== As lead artist ====
List of singles as lead artist, with selected chart positions, showing year released and album name
Title	Year	Peak chart positions	Album
Title	Year	CAN	Album
"Her Daddy Don't Like Me" (featuring JB and Scotch Butta)	2010	—	non-album single
"Switch"	2014	—	Marauding in Paradise
"New Religion"	2015	—	Marauding in Paradise
"Dead or Alive"	2015	—	Marauding in Paradise
"Stick & Move"	2015	—	Hotel Paranoia
"I Know"	2015	—	Hotel Paranoia
"Ring" (with Ye Ali)	2016	—	non-album singles
"Waste"	2016	—	non-album singles
"Just in Case"	2016	—	non-album singles
"Pree"	2016	—	non-album singles
"Tempted"	2017	91	Fleurever
"How Did I Get This Deep?"	2017	—	non-album single
"Right Now" (featuring KTOE)	2018	—	Fleurever
"Godflower"	2018	—	Fleurever
"Which One"	2018	—	Fleurever
"Touring" (with KTOE)	2019	—	non-album singles
"Itchin' for a Lick"	2020	—	non-album singles
"Disclosure"	2020	—	The Fleur Print
"Basement"	2020	—	The Fleur Print
"Nothin 2 Me" (with Cousin Stizz)	2021	—	The Fleur Print
"Two of 'Em" (with Buddy)	2021	—	The Fleur Print
"B.I.G." (with Grandtheft)	2021	—	TBA
"Woah" (with Tobi)	2021	—	TBA
"Rock the Boat" (with Kyle)	2021	—	The Fleur Print

==== As featured artist ====
List of singles as a featured artist, showing year released and album name
Title	Year	Album
"Special" (Lex Aura featuring Rexx Life Raj and Jazz Cartier)	2017	non-album single
"Come Inside" (Lou Phelps featuring Jazz Cartier)	2018	002 / Love Me
"Prettiest" (Ro Ransom featuring Jazz Cartier)	2018	Momentum
"Crazy World" (WaveIQ featuring Jazz Cartier)	2019	non-album single

=== Guest appearances ===
List of non-single guest appearances, with other performing artists, showing year released and album name
Title	Year	Artist(s)	Album
"Still Up"	2016	Wale, Phil Ade	Summer on Sunset
"Indicted Mind"	2016	Ken Rebel, Danny Seth	Indicted Mind
"Blue Cross, Blue Shield"	2017	Itsthereal	Teddy Bear Fresh
"Waterworld"	2018	Falcons, B. Lewis, GoldLink	Daydrift
"Ring 4x"	2019	Ye Ali	Private Suite
"Weekend"	2019	Ty Senoj	Metroflwr
"Casablanca"	2019	Naar, Issam	Safar

== Awards and nominations ==
Year	Award	Category	Nominated work	Result	Ref.
2015	SiriusXM Indie Awards	Rap/Hip-Hop Artist or Group of the Year	Himself	Nominated	
2015	Polaris Music Prize	Canadian Album of the Year	Marauding in Paradise	Nominated	
2016	SiriusXM Indie Awards	Rap/R&B Artist/Group of the Year	Himself	Nominated	
2016	iHeartRadio Much Music Video Awards	Best Hip-Hop Video	"The Valley/Dead or Alive"	Nominated	
2016	iHeartRadio Much Music Video Awards	Best New Canadian Artist	Himself	Nominated	
2016	SOCAN Songwriting Prize	Canadian Song of the Year	"Dead or Alive"	Nominated	
2016	Polaris Music Prize	Canadian Album of the Year	Hotel Paranoia	Nominated	
2017	Juno Award	Breakthrough Artist of the Year	Himself	Nominated	
2017	Juno Award	Rap Recording of the Year	Hotel Paranoia	Won	
2017	Canadian Independent Music Awards	Rap/R&B Artist/Group of the Year	Himself	Nominated	
2017	iHeartRadio Much Music Video Awards	Best Hip Hop Video	"Red Alert/100 Roses"	Nominated	

== Filmography ==
Film and television
Year	Title	Role	Notes
2017	6ix Rising	Himself	Documentary showcasing Toronto's hip-hop featuring numerous Canadian rap artists.
