= Peter Zezel =

Canadian ice hockey player

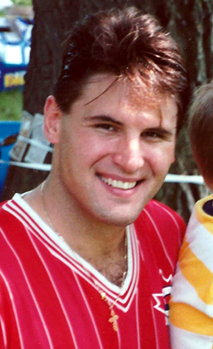
- Zezel in 1992
- Born: April 22, 1965 Scarborough, Ontario, Canada
- Died: May 26, 2009 (aged 44) Toronto, Ontario, Canada
- Height: 5 ft 11 in (180 cm)
- Weight: 200 lb (91 kg; 14 st 4 lb)
- Position: Centre
- Shot: Left
- Played for: Philadelphia Flyers; Washington Capitals; St. Louis Blues; Toronto Maple Leafs; Dallas Stars; New Jersey Devils; Vancouver Canucks
- NHL draft: 41st overall, 1983; Philadelphia Flyers
- Playing career: 1984–1999

Peter Zezel (April 22, 1965 – May 26, 2009) was a Canadian professional ice hockey centre who spent 15 seasons in the National Hockey League (NHL) from 1984 to 1999.

== Early life ==
Zezel was born and raised in Scarborough, Ontario. Zezel was an alumnus of Birchmount Park Collegiate Institute. His father Peter Zezel Sr. immigrated from Srb (near Gračac), Croatia, Yugoslavia in 1947. When Zezel Sr. arrived in Canada, he anglicized his family name from Žeželj.

== Playing career ==
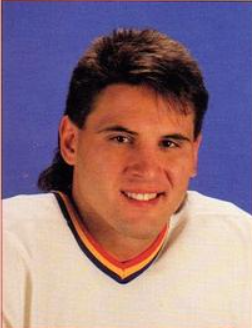
1989 photo of Zezel for St. Louis Blues

Zezel was selected 41st overall, in the second round of the 1983 NHL entry draft, by the Philadelphia Flyers. While he joined the NHL as a skilled offensive player and put up high scoring numbers in his first eight seasons, he spent the second half of his career primarily as a defensive specialist noted for his strong faceoff skills.

Zezel joined the Flyers' lineup in the 1984–85 at the age of 19 and made an instant impact, finishing fifth in rookie scoring with 61 points and setting a team record 46 assists by a rookie. He was part of a young Flyer team (with eight regulars under the age of 22, and only Mark Howe over the age of 27) which surprised the hockey world by reaching the Stanley Cup Final, where they were defeated by the Edmonton Oilers. The Flyers' head coach at the time was Mike Keenan, who became one of Zezel's biggest influences, and who would re-acquire Zezel several times later in their careers. When Zezel was in Philadelphia, his family hosted young Wendel Clark. Clark would stay in Zezel's room during the regular season with Zezel's family.

After a 54-point sophomore campaign, Zezel had his best year in 1986–87, registering career highs of 33 goals and 72 points (despite missing nine games to injury) while continuing to impress with his mature all-around game. That spring, he would again help the Flyers to the Stanley Cup Finals, registering 13 points before the team was again bested by the Oilers.

The Flyers dealt Zezel to the St. Louis Blues midway through the 1988–89 in exchange for Mike Bullard. Zezel played some of the best hockey of his career for the Blues, finishing the season with a career high 49 assists and 70 points. In the playoffs that year, he led the Blues with six goals and 12 points in just 10 games. In 1989–90, he had another fine season, posting 25 goals and 72 points.

In 1990, St. Louis dealt him to the Washington Capitals for Geoff Courtnall. His stay in Washington was brief, as he appeared in only 20 games before being dealt to his hometown Toronto Maple Leafs in a deal for Al Iafrate. He finished the 1990–91 season with 40 points in 52 games due to injury. In 1991–92, he recorded 49 points in 64 games in another year hampered by injury.

The hiring of Pat Burns as the Maple Leafs' head coach in 1992 represented a turning point in Zezel's career. While he had previously always been given a great deal of offensive responsibility, the defensive-minded Burns employed Zezel almost exclusively as a checking line center, and his numbers plummeted. Additionally, he continued to be plagued by injuries, missing half the 1993–94 season with an ongoing back problems that had bothered him for several years. On Oct 16 1993 Zezel had a freak accident during warm up vs a game against the Red Wings. The team was warming up on the ice. Zezel ruptured a disc in his lower back while taking a practice shot. He was bed ridden for three days. His house mate Wendel Clark reported Zezel was in extreme pain. His back was so swollen, that doctors could not take X-rays for days. However, when healthy he was still an effective player, and helped Toronto reach the Western Conference Finals in both 1993 and 1994, including a Game 1 overtime winner in 1994.

In the summer of 1994, Zezel was awarded to the Dallas Stars as compensation for the Leafs' signing of free agent Mike Craig. His one season in Dallas was a disappointment, as he was limited to just 30 games and 11 points by a knee injury. For 1995–96, he was signed by the St. Louis Blues and his old coach Keenan.

Dealt to the New Jersey Devils in 1997, his career hit a low point in the 1997–98 campaign when he was sent to the minors for the first time in his career. He performed well in the AHL with 50 points in 35 games for the Albany River Rats. Keenan, who was now coaching in Vancouver, had Zezel acquired by the Canucks in February 1998. There, Zezel was given a chance to contribute offensively alongside star winger Alexander Mogilny, and he responded with 17 points in 25 games, including a goal on his first shift as a Canuck.

Zezel's career ended abruptly at the trade deadline late in the 1998–99 season. Zezel's niece Jilliann was terminally ill with cancer in Toronto. Vancouver General Manager Brian Burke dealt him to the Mighty Ducks of Anaheim for future considerations but Zezel was in Toronto and refused to report to the Ducks, retiring from the NHL. Zezel called out the Canucks publicly insisting they should have known he would not accept a trade but Assistant GM Dave Nonis insisted there was nothing made clear. Burke insisted he was trying to give him an opportunity in the playoffs - one the Canucks couldn't offer him that year. Zezel requested the team donate his salary to the Canucks for Kids Foundation but Burke paid the remainder of Zezel's contract ($110,000) to him and made a charitable donation in the same amount.

Zezel finished his career playing 873 games, scoring 219 goals and 389 assists, with a total of 608 points.

== Soccer career ==
Peter Zezel
Personal information
- Position: Forward

Youth career
- Wexford SC

Senior career*
Years	Team	Apps	(Gls)
1982	Toronto Blizzard	0	(0)
1984	Toronto Italia		
1991	North York Rockets	2	(0)

International career
1982	Canada U20	2	(0)
- * Club domestic league appearances and goals

Zezel was an impressive soccer player in his youth. Although eventually choosing to concentrate on hockey, during off seasons early in his career, he continued to play competitively. Zezel was drafted by the Toronto Blizzard of the North American Soccer League, and appeared as striker in three exhibition games for them in 1982. He never appeared in an official NASL game. In 1984, he played in the National Soccer League with Toronto Italia. During the summer of 1991 he played for the North York Rockets of the Canadian Soccer League.

In May 2010, the Soccer Hall of Fame & Museum Board of Governors selected Zezel as the first recipient of the Brian Budd Award. Peter's father (Peter Sr.) was an accomplished soccer player for the Serbian White Eagles FC. Peter played his youth soccer for Wexford SC.

The skills he honed during his years on the pitch helped him on the ice. His soccer background made him a very strong player along the boards, and one of the best face-off men in the NHL. He was called up to the Canadian U16 camp in 1981, and the next year when he was 17, Zezel was a member of the Canadian national under-20 team at the 1982 CONCACAF U-20 Tournament appearing in two matches.

== Personal life ==
Hollywood used Zezel’s hockey skills in a small role in the 1986 film Youngblood. In retirement, he coached minor hockey teams in the Toronto area, and also operated a sports camp in Markham, Ontario that focused on improving the hockey and soccer skills of young players while having fun.

Zezel never married and had no children of his own.

== Death and legacy ==
In October 2001, Zezel almost died of the rare blood disorder that eventually claimed his life: hemolytic anemia. At the time he made a full recovery, but in 2009 his condition worsened and he was "close to death". Zezel underwent chemotherapy and had his spleen removed as part of his treatment.

Shortly after his splenectomy, Zezel began complaining of serious headaches. Roughly twelve hours later, he once again underwent surgery, during which time surgeons had found hemorrhaging in his brain. He slowly lapsed into a coma, and was placed on life-support once his organs began to fail. As Zezel wanted to donate his organs, his family made the decision to remove him from life support so that the organs might be preserved. Zezel died on May 26, 2009, with the service taking place at the All Serbian Saints Serbian Orthodox Church in Mississauga.

Zezel was laid to rest in Pine Hills Cemetery in Scarborough.

In July 2014, a street in a new development in Scarborough was named Zezel Way to honour Zezel.

== Career statistics ==
			Regular season					Playoffs
Season	Team	League	GP	G	A	Pts	PIM	GP	G	A	Pts	PIM
1981–82	Don Mills Flyers AAA	Midget	40	43	51	94	36	—	—	—	—	—
1982–83	Toronto Marlboros	OHL	66	35	39	74	28	4	2	4	6	0
1983–84	Toronto Marlboros	OHL	68	47	86	133	31	9	7	5	12	4
1984–85	Philadelphia Flyers	NHL	65	15	46	61	26	19	1	8	9	28
1985–86	Philadelphia Flyers	NHL	79	17	37	54	76	5	3	1	4	4
1986–87	Philadelphia Flyers	NHL	71	33	39	72	71	25	3	10	13	10
1987–88	Philadelphia Flyers	NHL	69	22	35	57	42	7	3	2	5	7
1988–89	Philadelphia Flyers	NHL	26	4	13	17	15	—	—	—	—	—
1988–89	St. Louis Blues	NHL	52	17	36	53	27	10	6	6	12	4
1989–90	St. Louis Blues	NHL	73	25	47	72	30	12	1	7	8	4
1990–91	Washington Capitals	NHL	20	7	5	12	10	—	—	—	—	—
1990–91	Toronto Maple Leafs	NHL	32	14	14	28	4	—	—	—	—	—
1991–92	Toronto Maple Leafs	NHL	64	16	33	49	26	—	—	—	—	—
1992–93	Toronto Maple Leafs	NHL	70	12	23	35	24	20	2	1	3	6
1993–94	Toronto Maple Leafs	NHL	41	8	8	16	19	18	2	4	6	8
1994–95	Kalamazoo Wings	IHL	2	0	0	0	0	—	—	—	—	—
1994–95	Dallas Stars	NHL	30	6	5	11	19	3	1	0	1	0
1995–96	St. Louis Blues	NHL	57	8	13	21	12	10	3	0	3	2
1996–97	St. Louis Blues	NHL	35	4	9	13	12	—	—	—	—	—
1996–97	New Jersey Devils	NHL	18	0	3	3	4	2	0	0	0	10
1997–98	Albany River Rats	AHL	35	13	37	50	18	—	—	—	—	—
1997–98	New Jersey Devils	NHL	5	0	3	3	0	—	—	—	—	—
1997–98	Vancouver Canucks	NHL	25	5	12	17	2	—	—	—	—	—
1998–99	Vancouver Canucks	NHL	41	6	8	14	16	—	—	—	—	—
2002–03	Cambridge Hornets	OHASr	8	5	4	9	0	—	—	—	—	—
2003–04	Cambridge Hornets	OHASr	18	7	17	24	16	—	—	—	—	—
2004–05	Cambridge Hornets	MLH	4	0	6	6	2	—	—	—	—	—
NHL totals			873	219	389	608	435	131	25	39	64	83
