= Reza Dahya =

Canadian film director

Reza Dahya is a Canadian film director, whose full-length feature debut film Boxcutter premiered in 2024.

Originally from Vancouver, British Columbia, Dahya began his career as host of O.T.A. Live on CFXJ-FM in the 2000s. After leaving the station he was a producer of Keyz of Life, a posthumous tribute album to Canadian hip hop record producer Anthony "Durty Keyz" James.

He later turned to filmmaking, directing a number of short films, and collaborating with several emerging directors on the 2019 anthology film Samanthology, before releasing Boxcutter in 2024. The film premiered at the 2024 Atlantic International Film Festival, and was subsequently screened at the 2024 Reelworld Film Festival, where Dahya won the award for Outstanding Direction in a Feature Film.
