= Boxcutter (film) =

2024 Canadian drama film directed by Reza Dahya

- Theatrical release poster
- Directed by: Reza Dahya
- Written by: Chris Cromie
- Produced by: Reza Dahya; Alison Almeida; Soko Negash; Kirthiga Rajanayagam
- Starring: Ashton James; Zoe Lewis
- Cinematography: James Klopko
- Production company: Back Up Your Ish
- Distributed by: Game Theory Films
- Release date: September 15, 2024 (AIFF)
- Running time: 94 minutes
- Country: Canada
- Language: English

Boxcutter is a 2024 Canadian drama film, produced and directed by Reza Dahya. The film stars Ashton James as Rome, an aspiring rapper in Toronto who must try to find and recover his laptop, containing all of his song demo files, when it is stolen shortly before an important meeting with a music producer.

The cast also includes Viphusan Vani, Clairmont the Second, Matthew Worku, Rich Kidd, Chelsea Braam-Carew, Nayo, Nick Atef, Izaiah Dockery, Angie Reid, Shomari Downer, Andréa Grant, Junia-T, Faizan Khan, Marlon Palmer, Charlie Ebbs, Alexa Higgins, Siobhan Johnson, Juan Arboleda, Richard Veltri, Sharon Forrester, Katie Ortencio, Teq Zwarych, Daniel Lavigne and Neema Nazeri in supporting roles.

The film premiered at the 2024 Atlantic International Film Festival. It was subsequently screened at the 2024 Reelworld Film Festival, where Dahya won the award for Outstanding Direction in a Feature Film. It had its international premiere at the 2025 South by Southwest Film & TV Festival on March 8, 2025.

It opened in Toronto theatres on June 13, 2025.
