= Josh Epstein =

Canadian actor, producer and writer

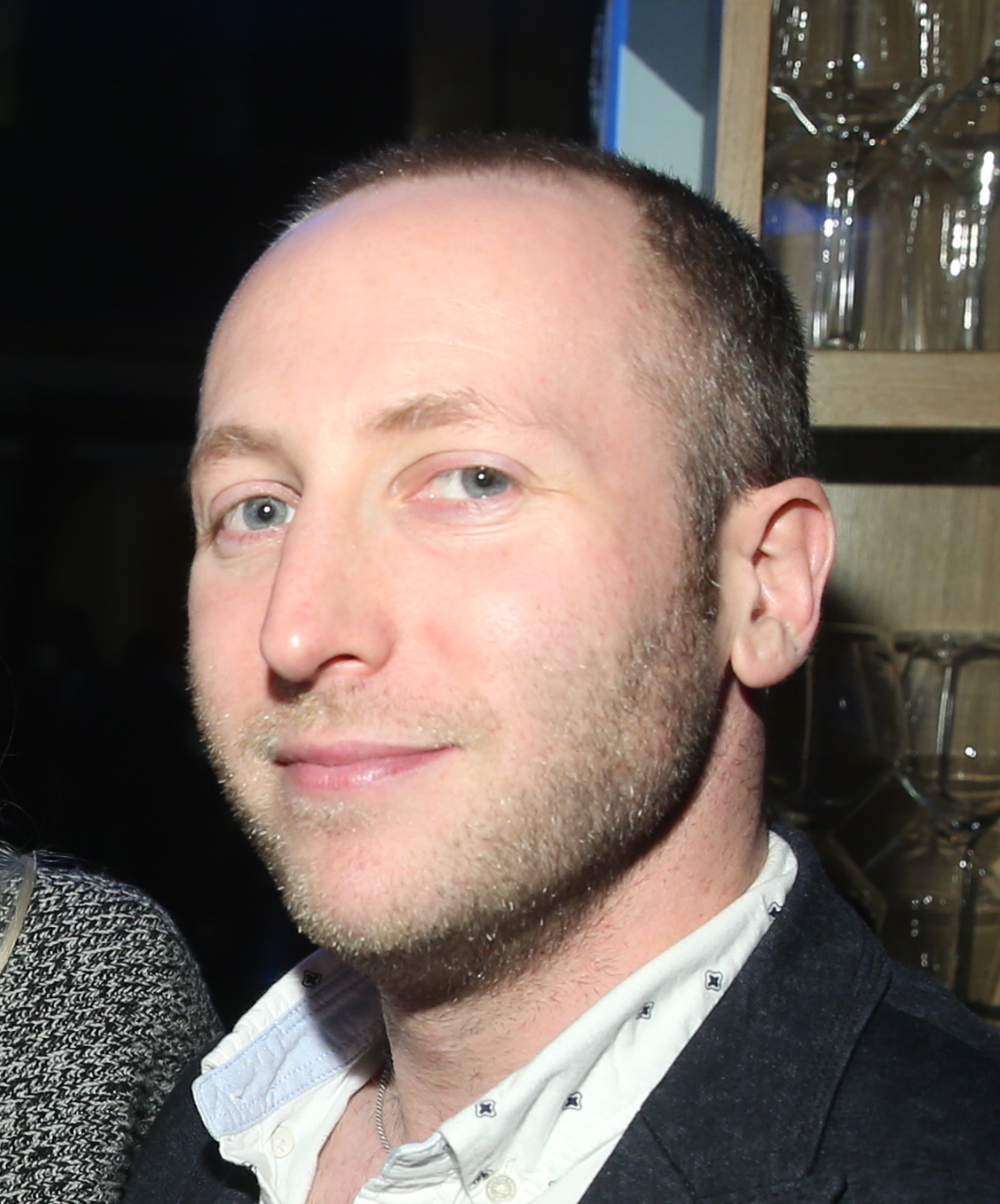
- Epstein in 2018
- Occupations: Actor; producer; writer

Note: this individual is not related to Jeffrey Epstein in any way.

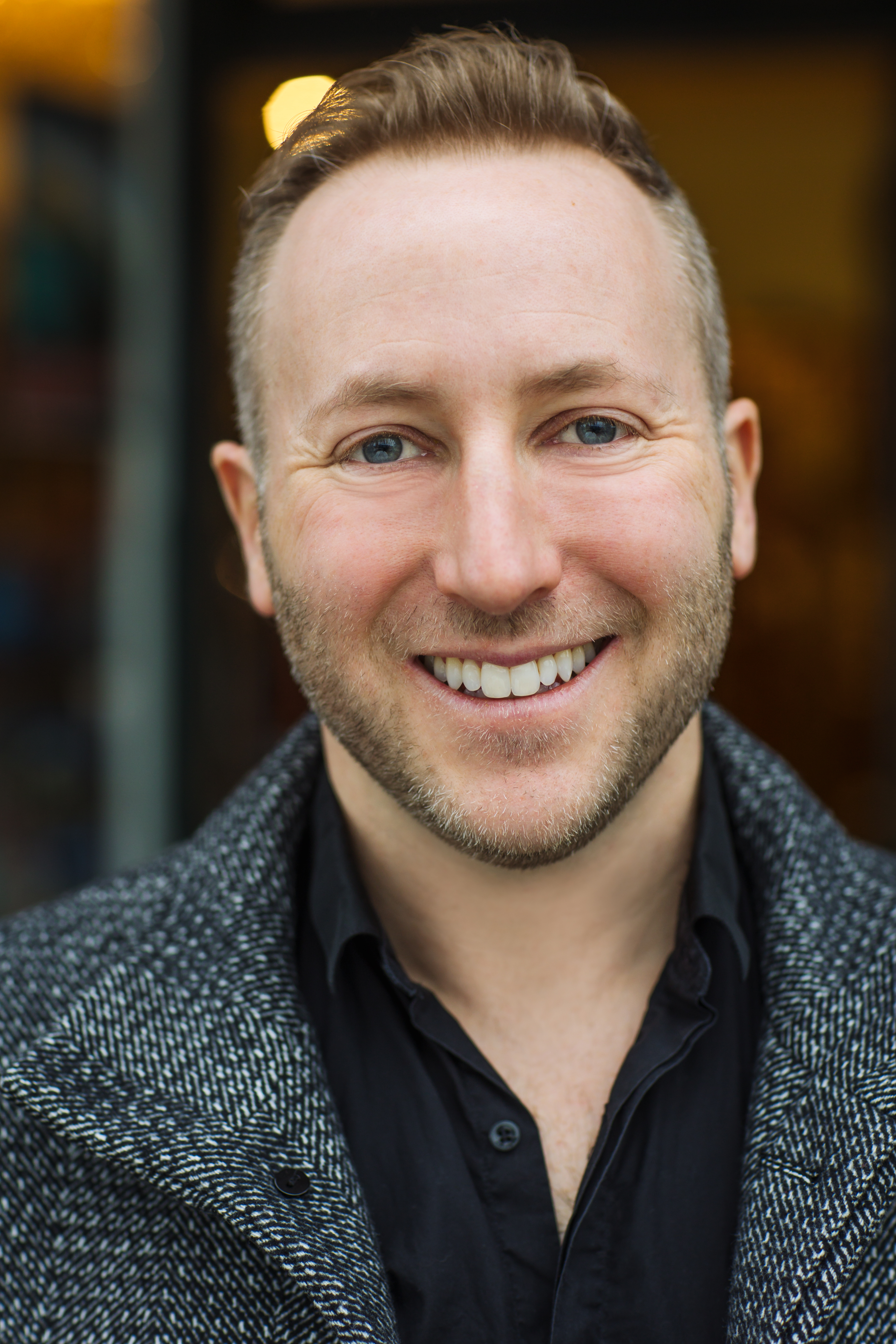

Josh Epstein is a Canadian actor, producer and writer. He is a writer on the reimagining of the film Youngblood and sold a screenplay called Astrid's Deathlist to Paramount Pictures with Lorenzo DiBonaventura producing. He produced, co-wrote and acted in Adventures in Public School starring Judy Greer, Russell Peters, Grace Park and Daniel Doheny which premiered at the Toronto International Film Festival in 2017. He received a Canadian Screen Award nomination for Best Adapted Screenplay at the 4th Canadian Screen Awards in 2016, as cowriter with Kyle Rideout of the film Eadweard; he also had a supporting role in the film as Thomas Edison.

With Rideout, Seneca Aaron and Charles Officer, he co-wrote the screenplay for the 2025 film Youngblood.

As a stage actor in Canada, his roles have included Michael Darling in a 1988 production of Peter Pan, Charlie in Marvin's Room, Speed in Two Gentlemen of Verona, Joey in Pal Joey, LeFou in Beauty and the Beast, Leo Bloom in The Producers, one of the gangster pastry chefs in The Drowsy Chaperone, Barfee in The 25th Annual Putnam County Spelling Bee, Freddy Benson in Dirty Rotten Scoundrels, Barnaby in The Matchmaker, Berowne in Love's Labour's Lost, and Lensky in Onegin. He won Jessie Theatre Richardson Awards for his acting as Barfee and Lensky and the Ovation Theatre Award for his performance as Leo Bloom in The Producers. Josh recently won the 2025 Ovation Awards for Best Director, Oliver, and best actor as Leo Frank in Parade.

He has also appeared in guest roles on the television series The X-Files, Breaker High, So Weird and Package Deal, and as a chorus dancer in the 2007 film Hairspray.

He has also written two one-man plays, Walking Away and Wow, I Didn't Know She Was Jewish.

In May 2026, he was named as the new executive director of the Whistler Film Festival.
